= Manuel Maldonado =

Venezuelan racing driver (born 1999)

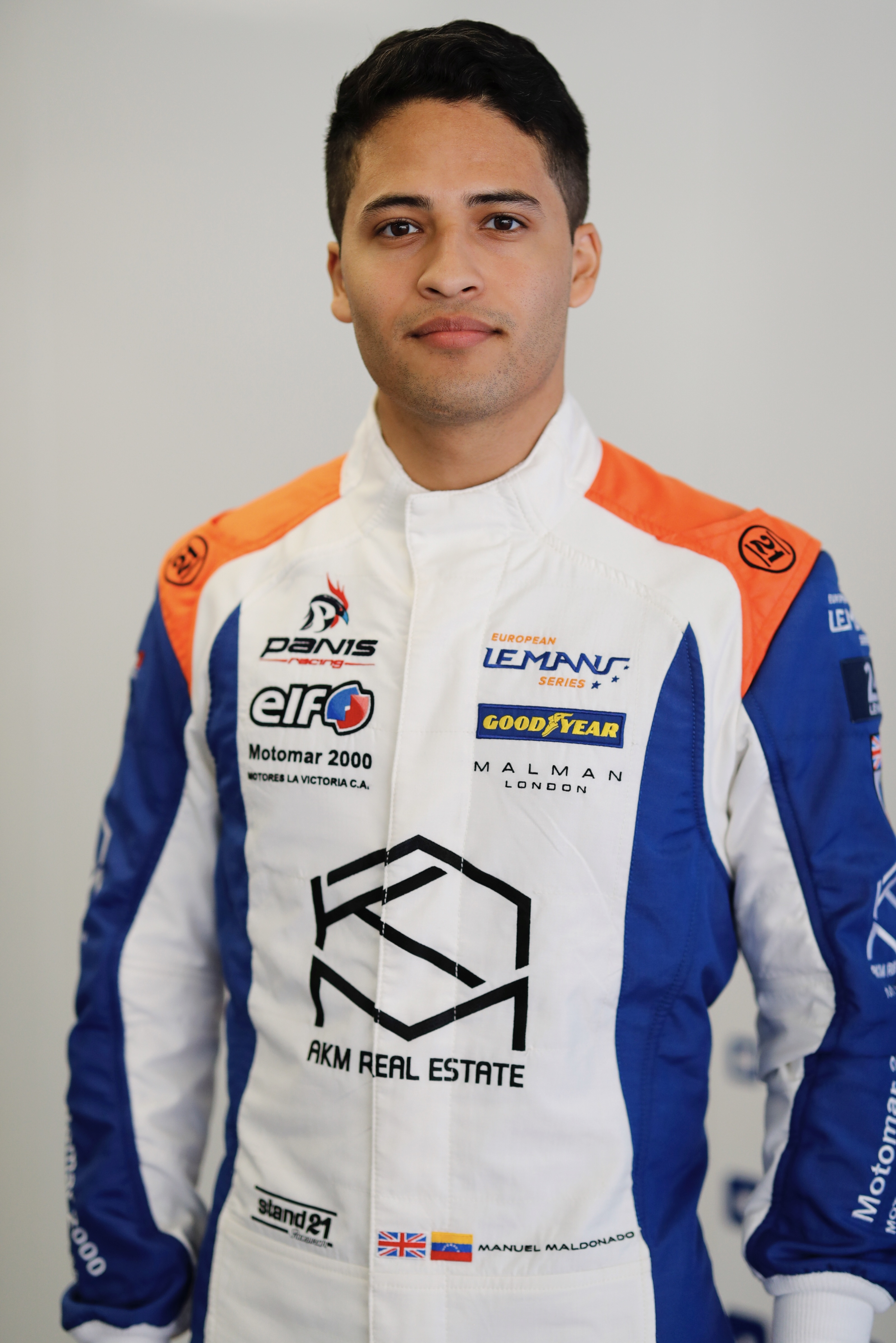
- Manuel Maldonado in 2023
- Nationality: (Venezuela) Venezuelan
- Born: Manuel Maldonado Vargas; 5 October 1999 (age 27) Maracay, Venezuela
- Relatives: Pastor Maldonado (cousin)

European Le Mans Series career
- Debut season: 2021
- Current team: United Autosports
- Categorisation: FIA Silver
- Car number: 22
- Former teams: Panis Racing
- Starts: 23
- Wins: 1
- Podiums: 5
- Poles: 2
- Fastest laps: 0
- Best finish: 3rd in 2023 (LMP2)

Previous series
- 2016 2016-18 2017-19: Italian F4 Championship; MRF Challenge; BRDC British F3 Championship

Championship titles
- 2021: Asian Le Mans Series - LMP3

Manuel Maldonado Vargas (born 5 October 1999) is a Venezuelan racing driver who last competed in the European Le Mans Series for United Autosports. He is the cousin of former Formula One driver Pastor Maldonado.

== Early career ==
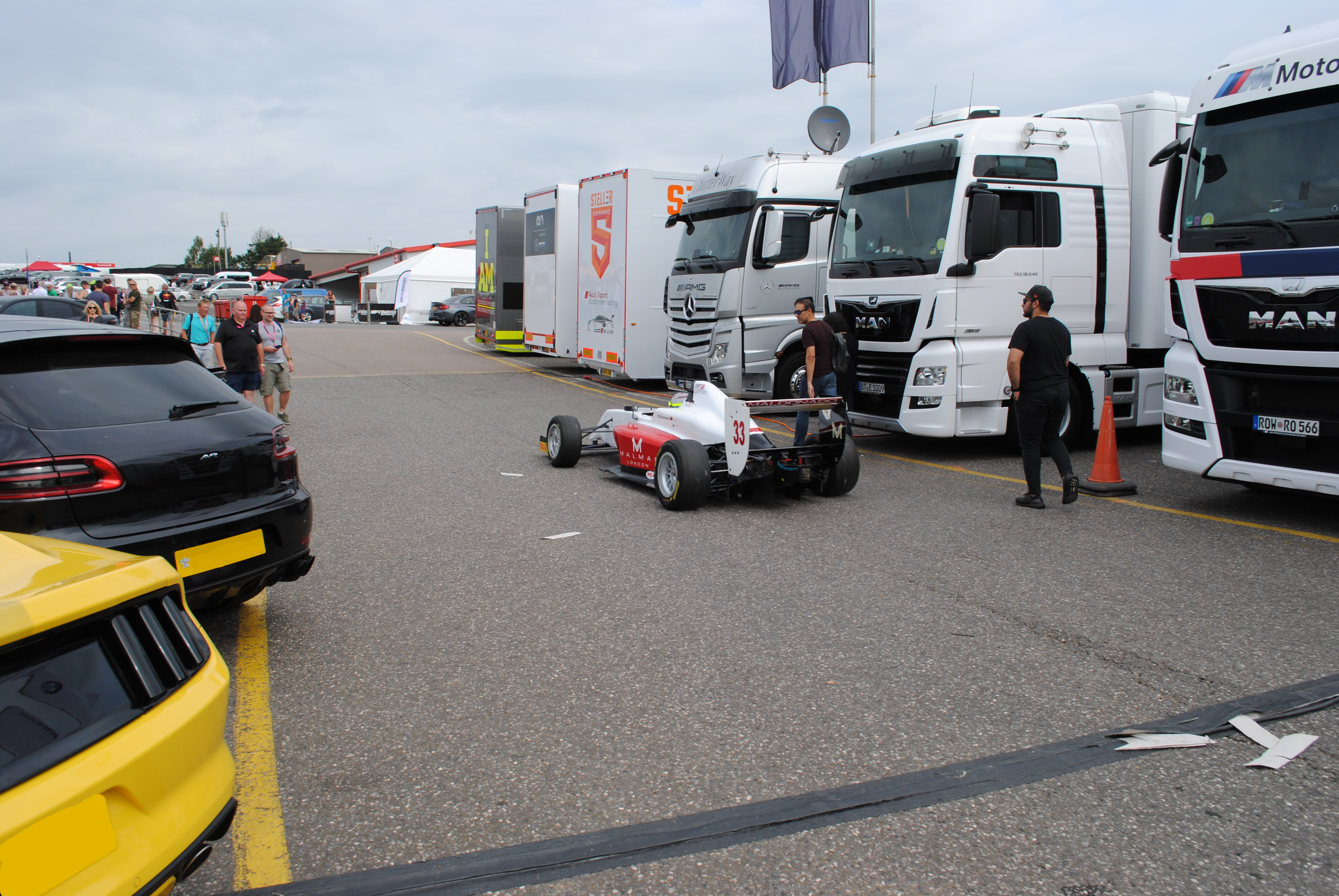
Maldonado in the paddock at the Brands Hatch British F3 round in 2019.

=== Italian F4 ===
Maldonado's first experience in single seaters was in Italian F4 in 2016. He drove alongside Leonard Hoogenboom for the Cram Motorsport team; a lackluster first year in Italian F4 saw Maldonado fail to score any points and record a best result of 12th at Adria.

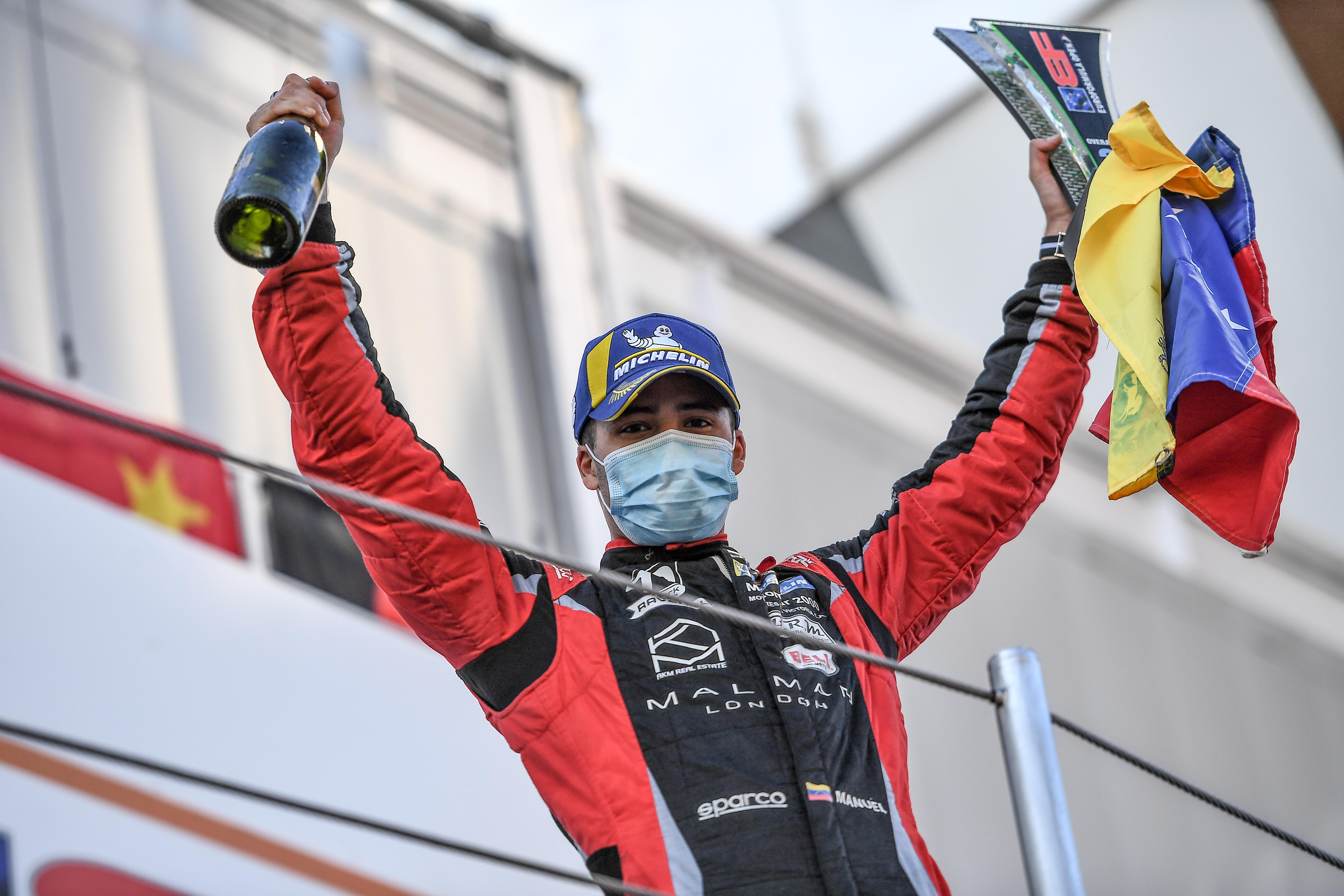
Manuel Maldonado in Barcelona 2020.

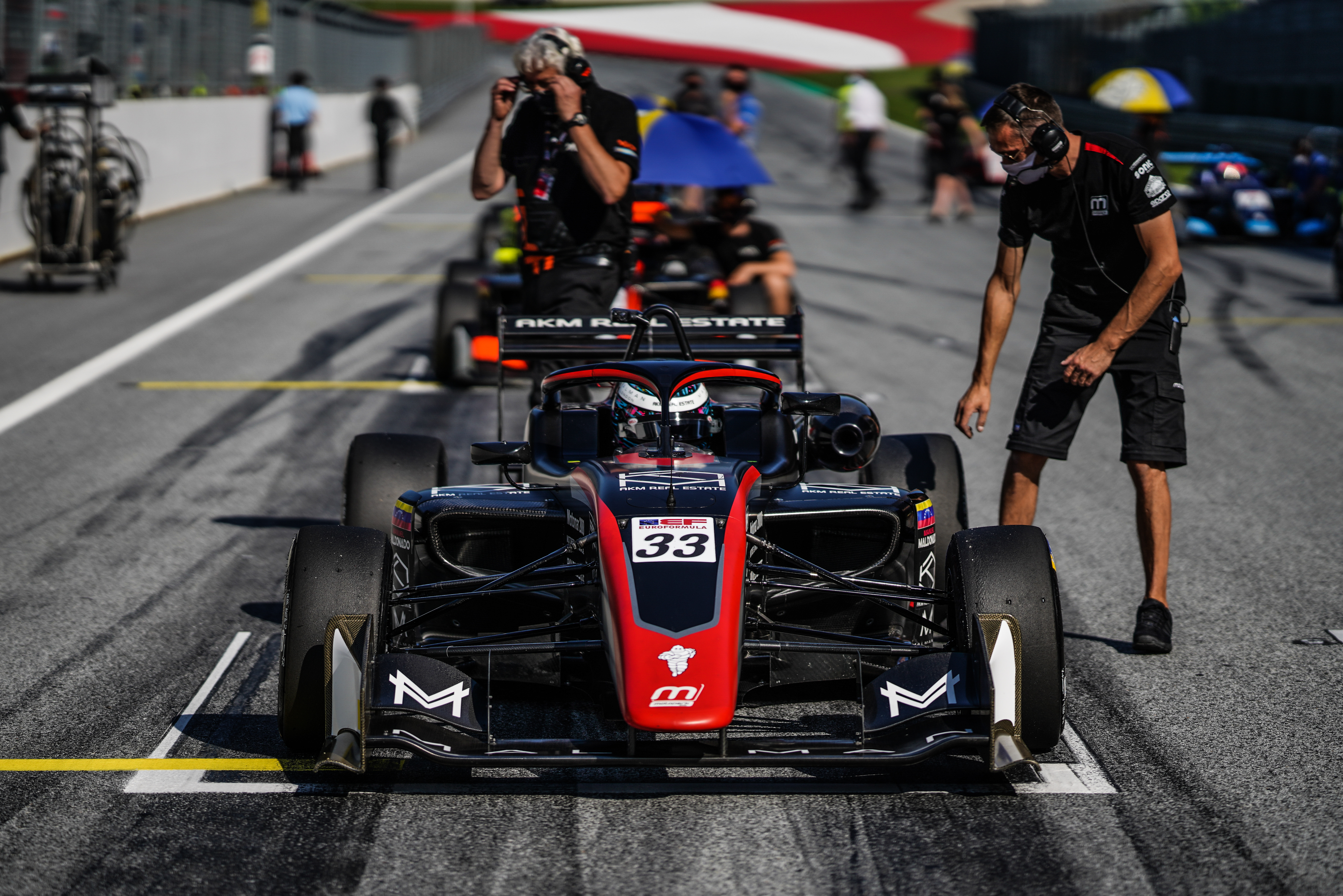
Maldonado starting from the front row at the Red Bull Ring in 2020.

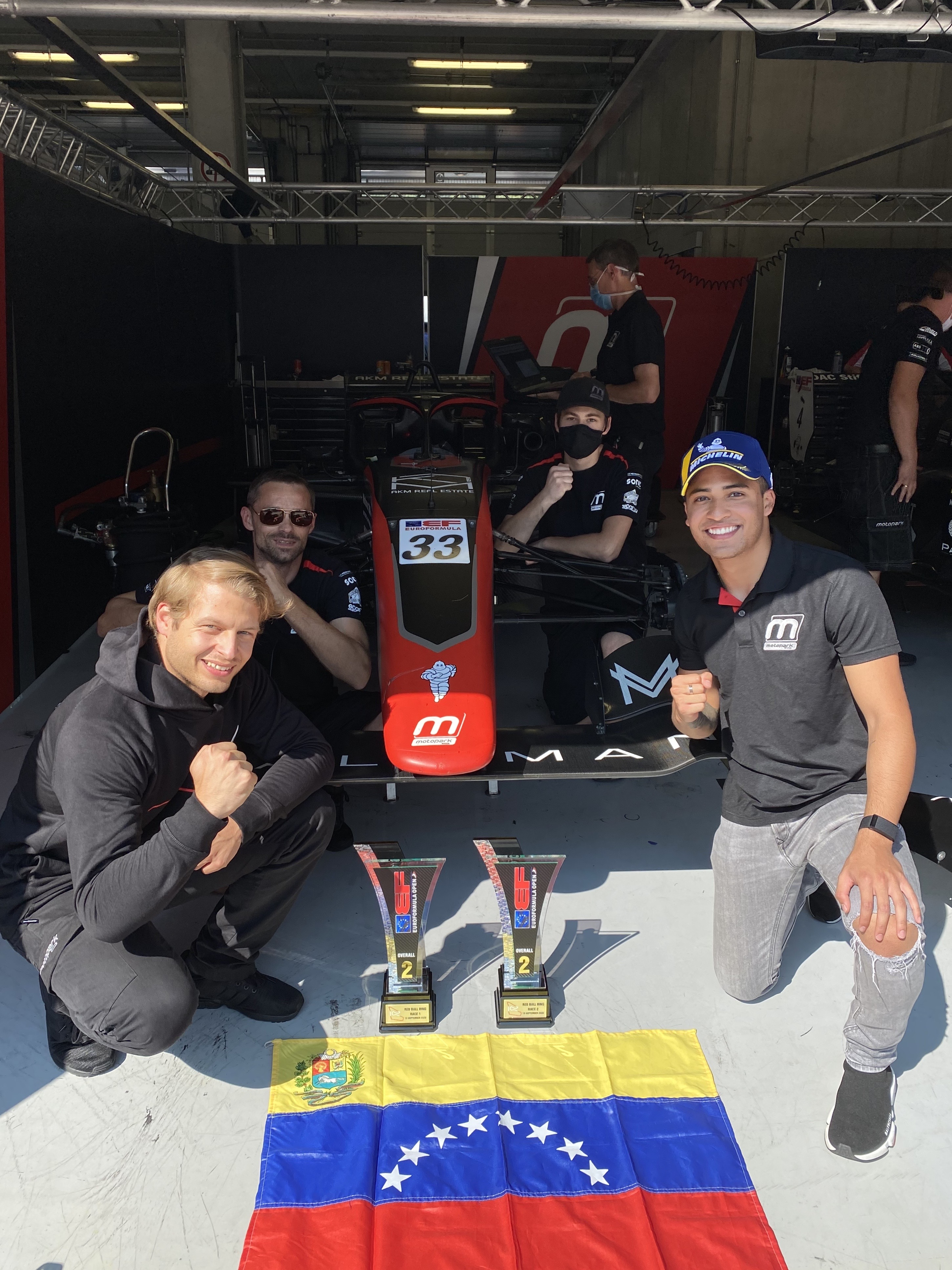
Maldonado in EFO 2020.

=== MRF Challenge ===
Maldonado's first points of his career came at the opening round of the 2016–17 MRF Challenge Formula 2000 Championship where he finished ninth. Another poor season took Maldonado to 14th in the table with his best two finishes of eighth coming at the Buddh International Circuit. Maldonado returned for the following campaign, finishing in the points on seven occasions. He originally finished third in the second Bahrain race, but was later disqualified.

=== British F3 ===
Maldonado joined the Fortec Motorsport team for the 2017 British F3 Championship. He was excluded from the final race at Rockingham for “driving in a manner not compatible with safety”, having previously spun out Omar Ismail. With a best finish of sixth at Silverstone, Maldonado ended up 12th in the standings. For 2018, Maldonado returned to British F3 with Fortec. At the opening round on a wet Oulton Park circuit, Maldonado went from sixth to first at the start of the reversed-grid race and hung on to win a safety-car-affected event. In the Snetterton reversed-grid race, Maldonado defended his pole position to win again. He concluded the year by finishing seventh overall. Maldonado remained at Fortec for a third season in 2019. A podium in the reversed-grid season opener at Oulton Park was followed by a best placing of fifth in the next two rounds respectively. Thanks to two offs for Nazim Azman in the Donington reversed-grid race, Maldonado inherited third place. Following a battle with Neil Verhagen in the first event at Spa-Francorchamps, the Venezuelan finished third again. Maldonado started Silverstone's reversed-grid race from pole, from where he drove out a commanding lead to claim victory. With his fifth podium of the season at Donnington, Maldonado improved to a sixth place in the championship table.

=== Euroformula Open ===
Maldonado joined the Germany-based Team Motopark for the 2020 Euroformula Open Championship. His maiden podiums came at the Red Bull Ring, where he finished second in both races. With further second places at Spa and Barcelona, Maldonado finished fourth in the standings in a season dominated by Ye Yifei.

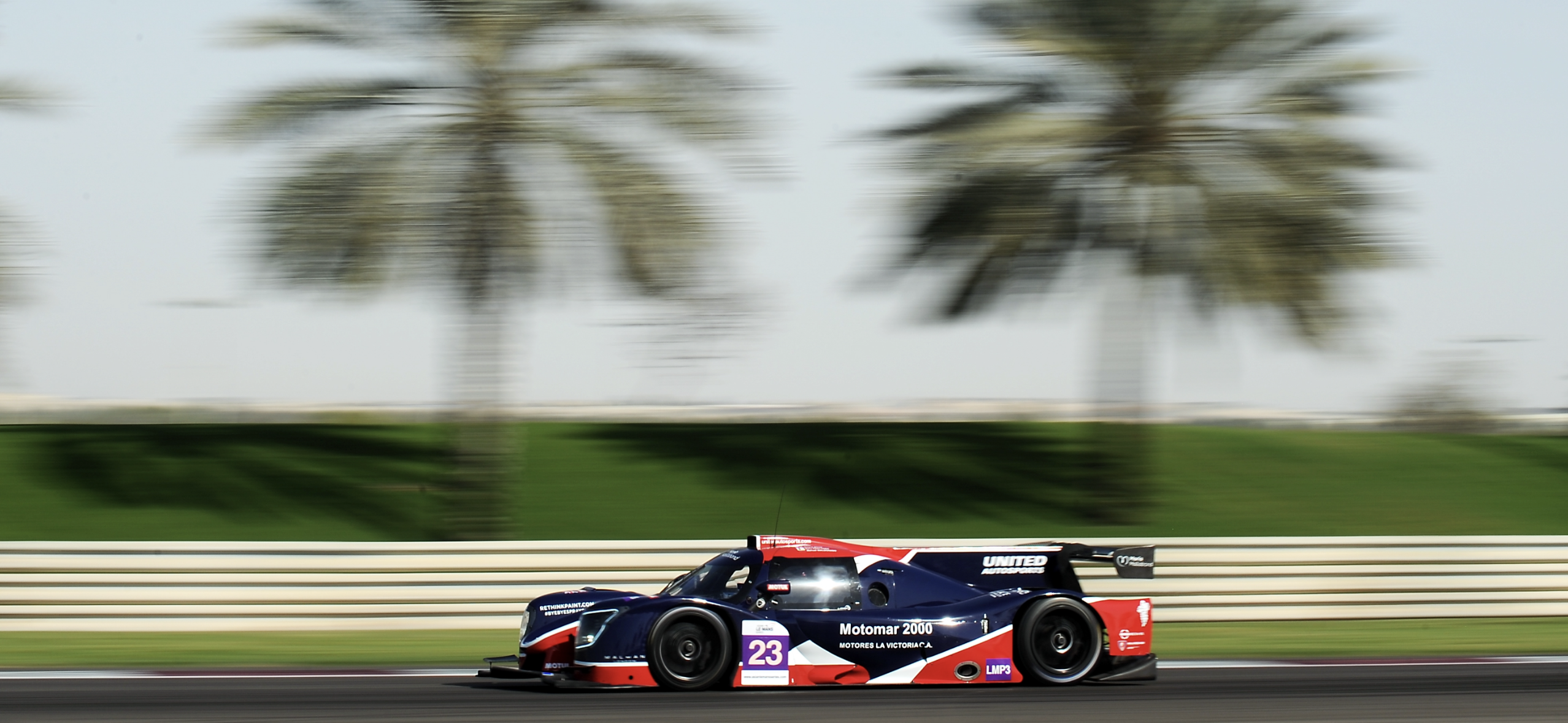
Maldonado at the Yas Marina Circuit for the ALMS in 2021.

== Sportscar career ==
=== 2021: AsLMS LMP3 title and LMP2 debut ===
Maldonado joined United Autosports for the Asian Le Mans Series at the start of 2021, driving a Ligier JS P320 in the LMP3 class alongside Wayne Boyd and Rory Penttinen. Two victories at Dubai laid the groundwork for the campaign. Following an alternator failure in the first Abu Dhabi race, the trio returned to dominate the following day, clinching the LMP3 title with a third win of the season.

Heading into the summer season, Maldonado stepped into the LMP2 category of the European Le Mans Series with United, partnering Nico Jamin and Job van Uitert. Despite finishing third at Le Castellet, the team ended up ninth in the teams' standings. The season included a positive COVID-19 test for van Uitert at Monza, which forced the team to miss the racing weekend, an early puncture at Spa which caused United to drop from podium contention to fifth with tyre wear issues as the race progressed, and a collision for van Uitert caused by Markus Pommer in Portimão. Maldonado also made his 24 Hours of Le Mans debut alongside Jamin and Jonathan Aberdein in 2021. In the race's sixth hour, Maldonado went through the gravel trap at the Dunlop Chicane due to wet conditions and hit the sister United car of Paul di Resta. This caused an immediate retirement for Maldonado's car and led to repairs for the sister entry; Maldonado later apologised for causing the incident.

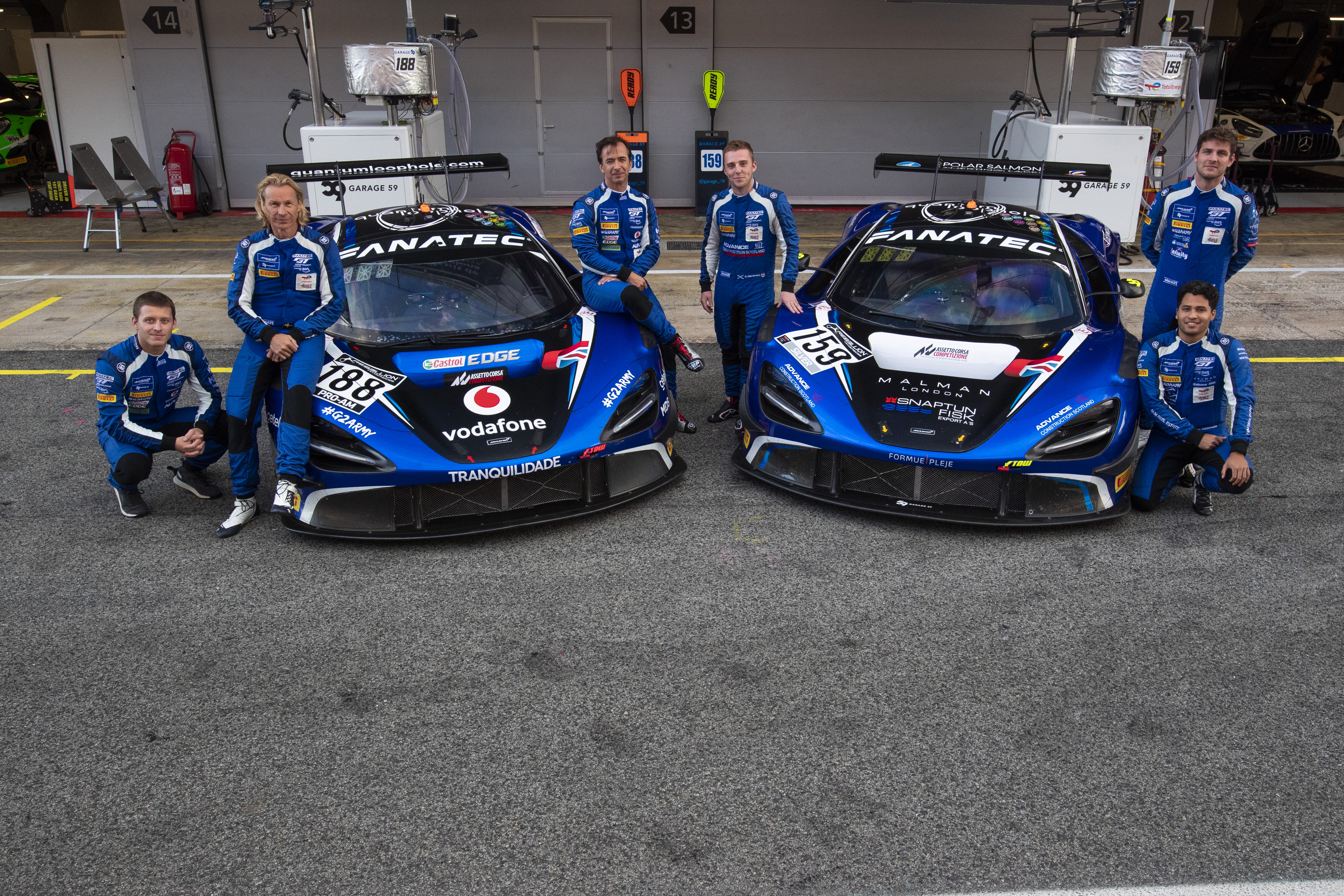
Manuel Maldonado and teammates with Garage 59 at Barcelona 2022.

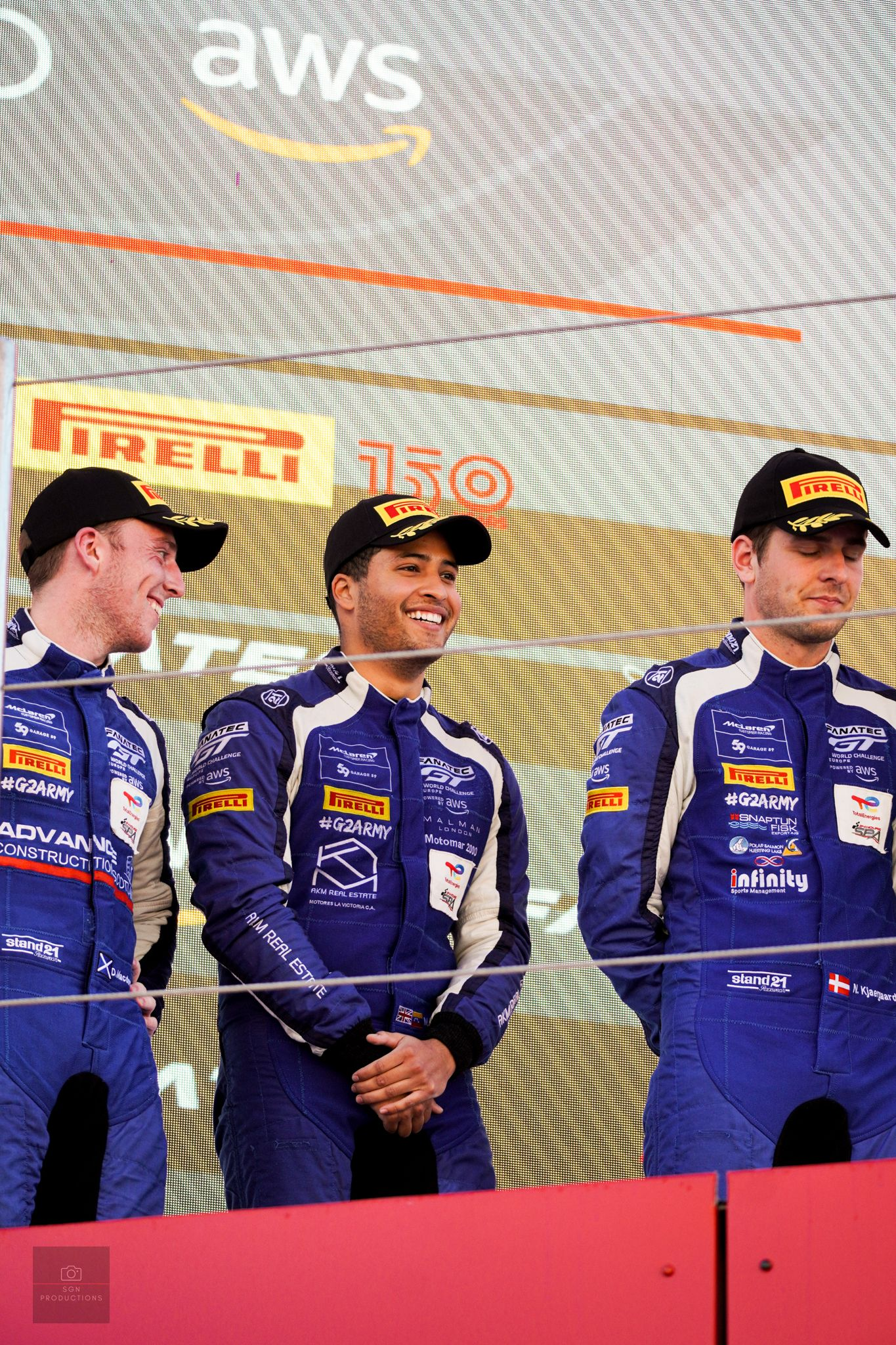
Maldonado in 2022 with team Garage 59.

=== 2022: GT World Challenge ===
In 2022, Maldonado made his GT debut with Garage 59, driving a McLaren 720S GT3 in the silver class of both GT World Challenge Europe championships. In the Endurance Cup, Maldonado scored two class podiums alongside Nicolai Kjærgaard; they finished sixth in the drivers' standings. In the Sprint Cup, Maldonado partnered Ethan Simioni for the first four events. Ahead of the final round, Simioni was replaced by Kjærgaard, alongside whom Maldonado scored a season-high sixth place overall and second in the silver category. Maldonado finished seventh in the Sprint Cup standings within his category.

=== 2023–24: ELMS with Panis ===
Maldonado returned to the ELMS in 2023, partnering Job van Uitert and Tijmen van der Helm at Panis Racing. After finishing fifth at Barcelona - third in the Pro class - the Panis crew dropped out of the lead in Le Castellet due to a puncture for van der Helm. A strong run by van Uitert in Aragón was undone by a late Full-Course Yellow period, after which the Panis car fell to fourth. At the start of the 4 Hours of Spa-Francorchamps, Maldonado misjudged his braking point and caused a four-car pileup. Despite the damage and a penalty for the crash, Panis Racing finished eighth overall and second in the Pro class. In the Algarve race, the team finished third overall. They then repeated the feat in race 2 of the weekend and ended up third in the LMP2 Pro standings.

For the 2024 ELMS season, Maldonado remained at Panis, this time driving alongside Charles Milesi and Arthur Leclerc. The team began with a fifth place in Barcelona, then finished eighth in Le Castellet. Thanks to a pole position and subsequently strong race drive by Milesi, Maldonado won the 4 Hours of Imola. The team were provisionally demoted to second due to a FCY infringement penalty, before an appeal led to their win being reinstated. Panis were then on course for a podium at Spa, but Milesi lost pace in the closing laps and finished sixth. A fourth place in Mugello, where Milesi again dropped from the podium in the final laps, led to a title decider at Portimão. Though Milesi scored pole position, a collision between him and Felipe Drugovich caused the Panis crew to finish outside the points. This left Maldonado and his teammates fourth in the drivers' championship.

=== 2025: Return to United ===
Maldonado returned to United Autosports to contest the 2025 ELMS campaign alongside Ben Hanley and Grégoire Saucy. They placed 14th in the drivers' standings, scoring a best finish of sixth at Barcelona.

== Racing record ==
=== Career summary ===
Season	Series	Team	Races	Wins	Poles	FLaps	Podiums	Points	Position
2016	Italian F4 Championship	Cram Motorsport	20	0	0	0	0	0	36th
2016–17	MRF Challenge Formula 2000	MRF Racing	16	0	0	0	0	20	14th
2017	BDRC British Formula 3 Championship	Fortec Motorsports	23	0	0	0	0	205	12th
2017–18	MRF Challenge Formula 2000	MRF Racing	15	0	0	0	0	39	11th
2018	BRDC British Formula 3 Championship	Fortec Motorsports	23	2	0	0	2	292	7th
2019	BRDC British Formula 3 Championship	Fortec Motorsports	24	1	0	1	5	348	6th
2019	Euroformula Open Championship	Fortec Motorsports	2	0	0	0	0	0	24th
2020	Euroformula Open Championship	Team Motopark	18	0	0	0	4	153	4th
2021	European Le Mans Series - LMP2	United Autosports	5	0	0	0	1	28.5	12th
2021	Asian Le Mans Series - LMP3	United Autosports	4	3	1	1	3	78	**1st**
2021	24 Hours of Le Mans - LMP2	United Autosports	1	0	0	0	0	N/A	DNF
2022	GT World Challenge Europe Sprint Cup	Garage 59	10	0	0	0	0	4.5	21st
2022	GT World Challenge Europe Sprint Cup - Silver Cup	Garage 59	10	0	1	0	1	54	7th
2022	GT World Challenge Europe Endurance Cup	Garage 59	5	0	0	0	0	0	NC
2022	GT World Challenge Europe Endurance Cup - Silver	Garage 59	5	0	1	0	2	40	6th
2022	Asian Le Mans Series - GT	Garage 59	4	0	0	0	0	2	15th
2023	European Le Mans Series - LMP2	Panis Racing	6	0	0	0	4	86	**3rd**
2023	24 Hours of Le Mans - LMP2	Panis Racing	1	0	0	0	0	N/A	14th
2023	Nürburgring Endurance Series - VT2-FWD	Walkenhorst Motorsport	4	1	0	0	2	0	NC†
2024	European Le Mans Series - LMP2	Panis Racing by TDS	6	1	2	0	1	61	4th
2025	European Le Mans Series - LMP2	United Autosports	6	0	0	0	0	15	14th

^{†} As Maldonado was a guest driver, he was ineligible for championship points.

=== Complete Italian F4 Championship results ===
(key) (Races in bold indicate pole position) (Races in italics indicate fastest lap)

Year	Team	1	2	3	4	5	6	7	8	9	10	11	12	13	14	15	16	17	18	19	20	21	22	23	Pos	Points
2016	Cram Motorsport	MIS; 1	MIS; 2; 21	MIS; 3; 20	MIS; 4 DNQ	ADR; 1; 18	ADR; 2	ADR; 3; 12	ADR; 4; 21	IMO1; 1; 23	IMO1; 2; 28	IMO1; 3; 24	MUG; 1; 27	MUG; 2; 19	MUG; 3; 24	VLL; 1 Ret	VLL; 2 Ret	VLL; 3; 23	IMO2; 1; 13	IMO2; 2; 16	IMO2; 3; 18	MNZ; 1; 16	MNZ; 2; 21	MNZ; 3; 17	36th	0

=== Complete MRF Challenge Formula 2000 Championship results ===
(key) (Races in bold indicate pole position) (Races in italics indicate fastest lap)

Year	1	2	3	4	5	6	7	8	9	10	11	12	13	14	15	16	Pos	Points
2016-17	BHR; 1; 12	BHR; 2; 9	BHR; 3 Ret	BHR; 4; 12	DUB; 1; 10	DUB; 2; 11	DUB; 3 Ret	DUB; 4; 9	GNO; 1; 9	GNO; 2; 8	GNO; 3; 12	GNO; 4; 8	CHE; 1; 9	CHE; 2 Ret	CHE; 3; 9	CHE; 4; 10	14th	20
2017-18	BHR; 1; 5	BHR; 2 DSQ	BHR; 3; 15	BHR; 4; 6	DUB; 1 Ret	DUB; 2; 13	DUB; 3; 6	DUB; 4; 10	YMC; 1; 11	YMC; 2; 10	YMC; 3; 5	YMC; 4; 11	CHE; 1; 12	CHE; 2 Ret	CHE; 3; 12	CHE; 4; 10	12th	39

=== Complete BRDC British Formula 3 Championship results ===
(key) (Races in bold indicate pole position; races in italics indicate fastest lap)

Year	Team	1	2	3	4	5	6	7	8	9	10	11	12	13	14	15	16	17	18	19	20	21	22	23	24	DC	Points
2017	Fortec Motorsports	OUL; 1; 15	OUL; 2; 7	OUL; 3; 15	ROC; 1; 13	ROC; 2; 10	ROC; 3 EX	SNE1; 1; 12	SNE1; 2 Ret	SNE1; 3; 11	SIL; 1; 8	SIL; 2; 6	SIL; 3; 13	SPA; 1; 15	SPA; 2; 14	SPA; 3; 15	BRH; 1; 10	BRH; 2; 8	BRH; 3; 13	SNE2; 1; 14	SNE2; 2; 11	SNE2; 3 Ret	DON; 1; 10	DON; 2; 7	DON; 3; 9	12th	205
2018	Fortec Motorsports	OUL; 1; 11	OUL; 2; 1^{5}	OUL; 3; 10	ROC; 1; 5	ROC; 2; 6^{1}	ROC; 3; 4	SNE; 1; 17	SNE; 2; 1	SNE; 3; 14	SIL1; 1; 12	SIL1; 2; 16	SIL1; 3; 7	SPA; 1; 4	SPA; 2; 11^{3}	SPA; 3; 4	BHI; 1; 8	BHI; 2; 7^{1}	BHI; 3; 7	DON; 1; 7	DON; 2 Ret	DON; 3; 8	SIL2; 1; 4	SIL2; 2; 13	SIL2; 3 C	7th	292
2019	Fortec Motorsports	OUL; 1; 8	OUL; 2; 3^{3}	OUL; 3; 8	SNE; 1; 8	SNE; 2; 9	SNE; 3; 5	SIL1; 1; 5	SIL1; 2; 10^{4}	SIL1; 3; 8	DON1; 1; 7	DON1; 2; 3^{5}	DON1; 3; 9	SPA; 1; 3	SPA; 2; 11^{5}	SPA; 3; 6	BRH; 1; 6	BRH; 2; 7^{4}	BRH; 3 Ret	SIL2; 1; 16	SIL2; 2; 1	SIL2; 3; 11	DON2; 1; 3	DON2; 2; 7^{6}	DON2; 3; 4	6th	348

=== Complete Euroformula Open Championship results ===
(key) (Races in bold indicate pole position) (Races in italics indicate fastest lap)

Year	Team	1	2	3	4	5	6	7	8	9	10	11	12	13	14	15	16	17	18	Pos	Points
2019	Fortec Motorsports	LEC; 1	LEC; 2	PAU; 1	PAU; 2	HOC; 1	HOC; 2	SPA; 1	SPA; 2	HUN; 1	HUN; 2	RBR; 1	RBR; 2	SIL; 1; 12	SIL; 2; 11	CAT; 1 WD	CAT; 2 WD	MNZ; 1	MNZ; 2	24th	0
2020	Team Motopark	HUN; 1; 5	HUN; 2; 6	LEC; 1; 7	LEC; 2; 14	RBR; 1; 2	RBR; 2; 2	MNZ; 1; 4	MNZ; 2 Ret	MNZ; 3; 10	MUG; 1; 11	MUG; 2; 6	SPA; 1; 6	SPA; 2; 12	SPA; 3; 2	CAT; 1; 5	CAT; 2; 4	CAT; 3; 7	CAT; 4; 2	4th	153

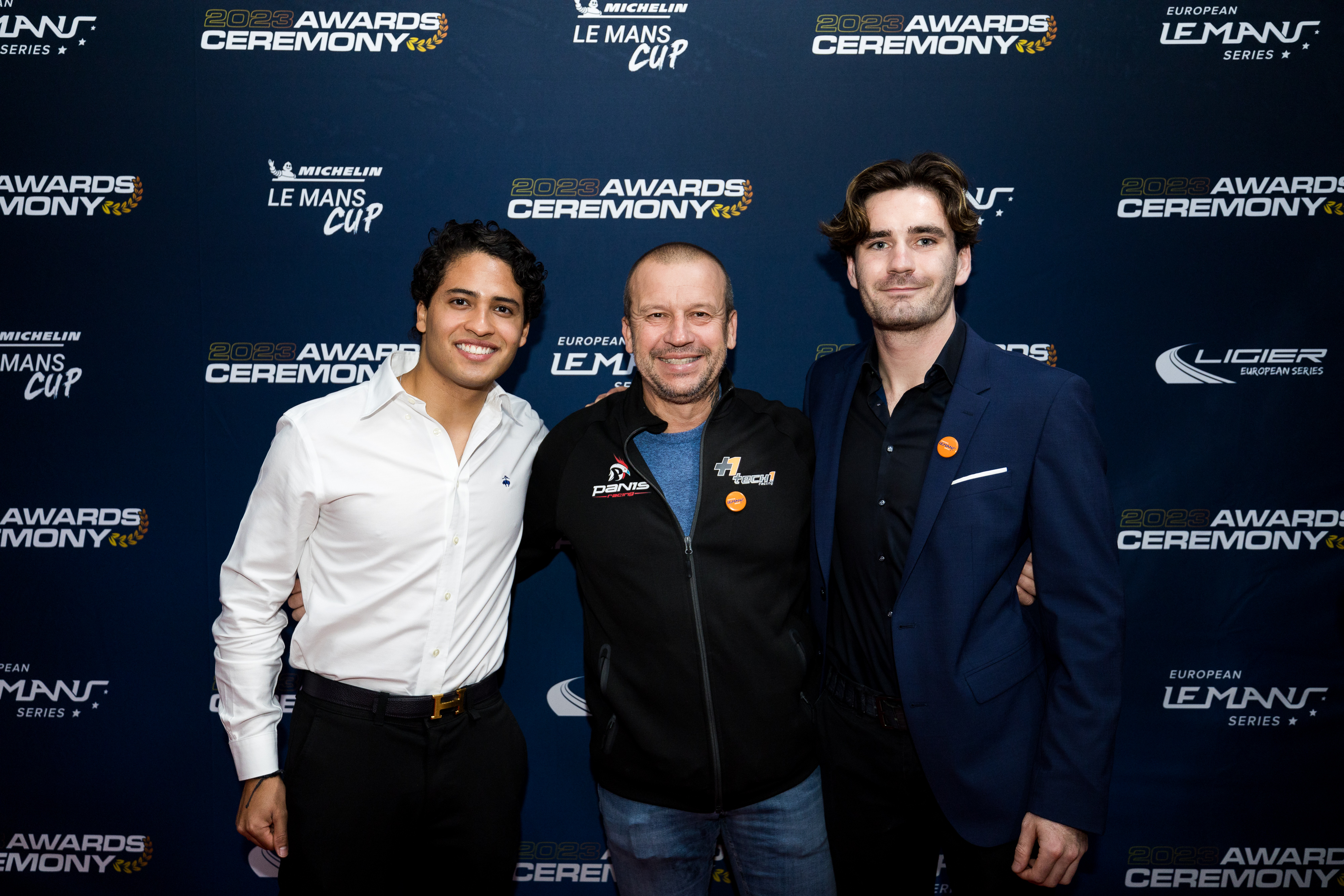
Manuel with team boss Olivier Panis and teammate Job van Uitert.

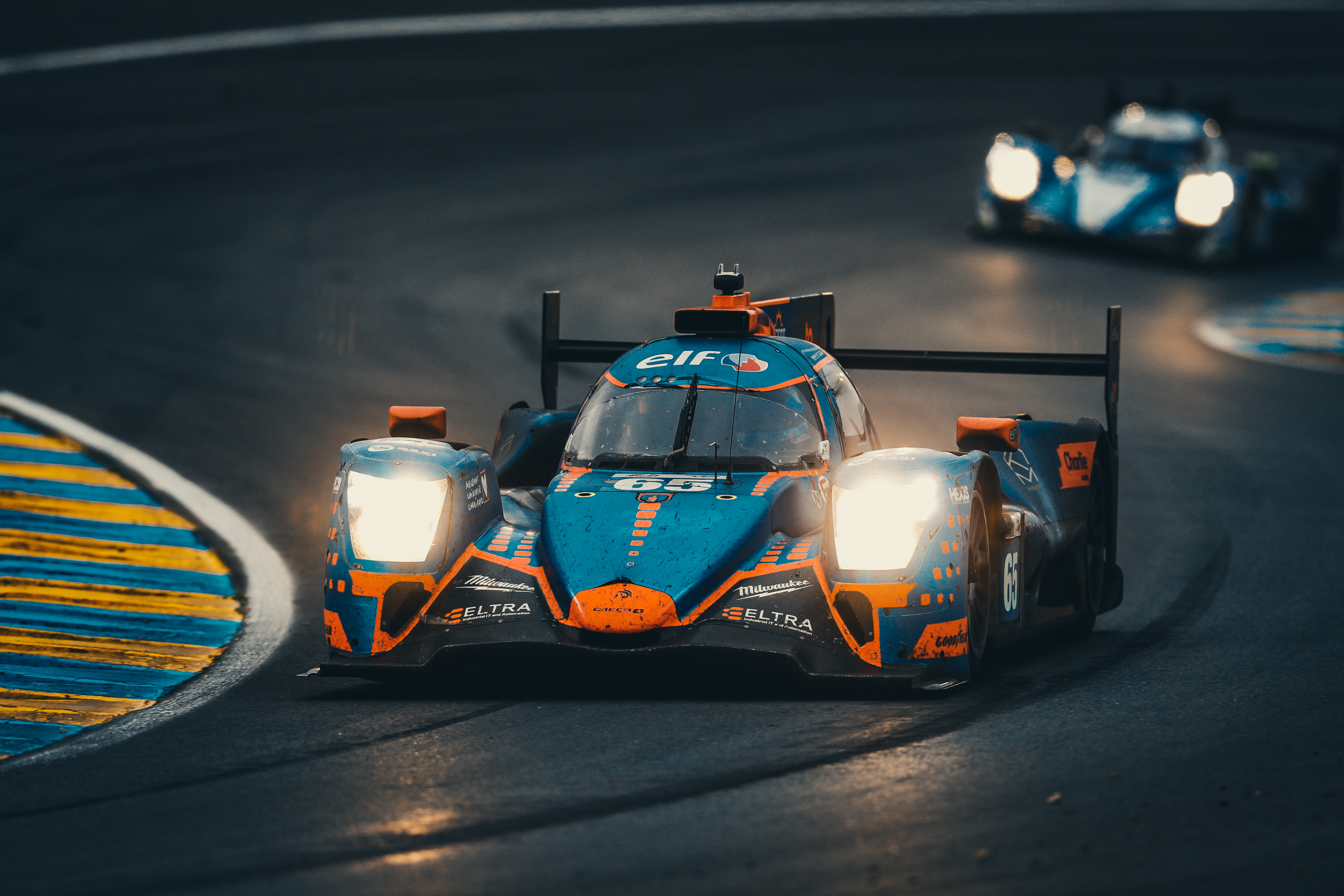
Maldonado at Le Mans.

=== Complete European Le Mans Series results ===
(key) (Races in bold indicate pole position; results in italics indicate fastest lap)

Year	Entrant	Class	Chassis	Engine	1	2	3	4	5	6	Rank	Points
2021	United Autosports	LMP2	Oreca 07	Gibson GK428 4.2 L V8	CAT; 9	RBR; 16	LEC; 3	MNZ; WD	SPA; 5	ALG; 10	12th	28.5
2023	Panis Racing	LMP2	Oreca 07	Gibson GK428 4.2 L V8	CAT; 2	LEC; 6	ARA; 4	SPA; 2	POR; 3	ALG; 3	3rd	86
2024	Panis VDS Racing	LMP2	Oreca 07	Gibson GK428 4.2 L V8	CAT; 5	LEC; 8	**IMO**; 1	SPA; 6	MUG; 4	**ALG**; 12	4th	61
2025	United Autosports	LMP2	Oreca 07	Gibson GK428 4.2 L V8	CAT; 6	LEC; 9	IMO; 8	SPA; Ret	SIL; 10	ALG; Ret	14th	15

=== Complete 24 Hours of Le Mans results ===
Year	Team	Co-Drivers	Car	Class	Laps	Pos.	Class Pos.
2021	(United Kingdom) United Autosports	(France) Nico Jamin (South Africa) Jonathan Aberdein	Oreca 07-Gibson	LMP2	75	DNF	DNF
2023	(France) Panis Racing	(Netherlands) Tijmen van der Helm (Netherlands) Job van Uitert	Oreca 07-Gibson	LMP2	316	25th	14th

=== Complete GT World Challenge Europe Endurance Cup results ===
(Races in bold indicate pole position) (Races in italics indicate fastest lap)

Year	Team	Car	Class	1	2	3	4	5	6	7	Pos.	Points
2022	Garage 59	McLaren 720S GT3	Silver	IMO; 20	LEC; Ret	SPA; 6H; 43	SPA; 12H; Ret	SPA; 24H; Ret	HOC; 18	**CAT**; 12	6th	40

=== Complete GT World Challenge Europe Sprint Cup results ===
(key) (Races in bold indicate pole position) (Races in italics indicate fastest lap)

Year	Team	Car	Class	1	2	3	4	5	6	7	8	9	10	Pos.	Points
2022	Garage 59	McLaren 720S GT3	Silver	BRH; 1; 15	BRH; 2; 13	MAG; 1; 16	MAG; 2; 14	ZAN; 1; 13	ZAN; 2; 22	MIS; 1; 19	MIS; 2; 20	VAL; 1; 14	**VAL**; **2**; 6	7th	54
