= 2021 4 Hours of Abu Dhabi =

Endurance sportscar racing event

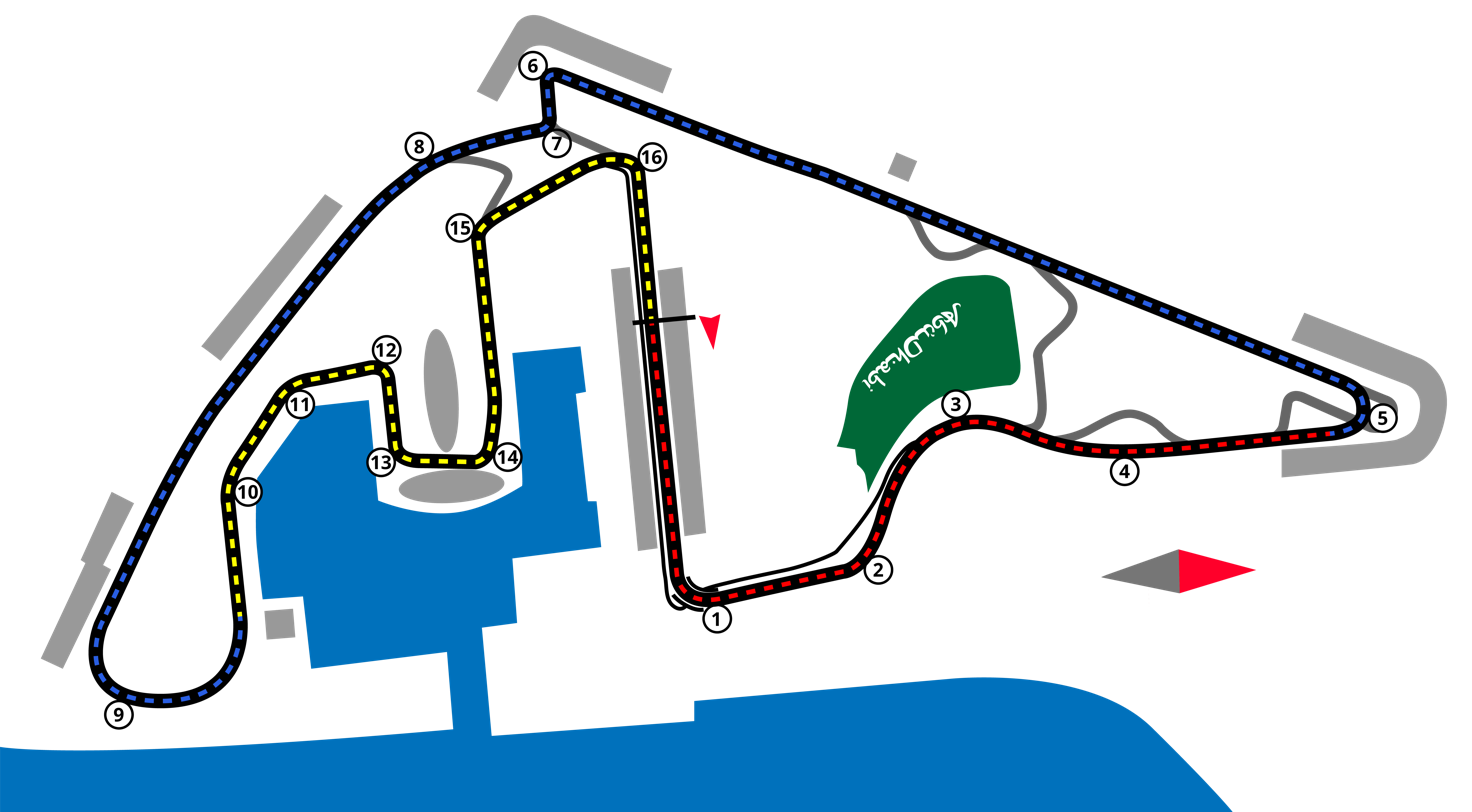
The layout of the Yas Marina Circuit

The 2021 4 Hours of Abu Dhabi was an endurance sportscar racing event held between 18 and 20 February 2021, as the final rounds of 2021 Asian Le Mans Series season.

== Schedule ==
Date	Time (local: GST)	Event
Thursday, 18 February	14:30	Free Practice 1
Thursday, 18 February	18:30	Free Practice 2
Friday, 19 February	9:40	Qualifying - Race 1
Friday, 19 February	10:00	Qualifying - Race 2
Friday, 19 February	16:00	Race 1
Saturday, 20 February	16:10	Race 2

== Free practice ==
- Only the fastest car in each class is shown.

Free Practice 1	Class	No.	Entrant	Time
Free Practice 1	LMP2	26	(Russia) G-Drive Racing	1:58.167
Free Practice 1	LMP3	23	(United Kingdom) United Autosports	2:05.004
Free Practice 1	GT	99	(Germany) Precote Herberth Motorsport	2:09.759
Free Practice 2	Class	No.	Entrant	Time
Free Practice 2	LMP2	26	(Russia) G-Drive Racing	1:56.848
Free Practice 2	LMP3	15	(United Kingdom) RLR MSport	2:04.438
Free Practice 2	GT	7	(United Kingdom) Inception Racing with Optimum Motorsport	2:08.746

== Race 1 ==
=== Qualifying ===
Pole positions in each class are indicated in bold.

Pos.	Class	No.	Entry	Driver	Time	Grid
1	**LMP2**	**25**	**(Russia) G-Drive Racing**	**(Argentina) Franco Colapinto**	**1:55.287**	1
2	LMP2	5	(Germany) Phoenix Racing	(South Africa) Kelvin van der Linde	1:55.493	2
3	LMP2	26	(Russia) G-Drive Racing	(Austria) Ferdinand Habsburg	1:55.774	3
4	LMP2	64	Racing Team India	(India) Arjun Maini	1:56.615	4
5	LMP2	28	(United Kingdom) Jota	(Indonesia) Sean Gelael	1:56.765	5
6	LMP2	18	(United States) Era Motorsport	(United Kingdom) Kyle Tilley	1:58.120	6
7	**LMP3**	**23**	**(United Kingdom) United Autosports**	**(United Kingdom) Wayne Boyd**	**2:03.694**	7
8	LMP3	15	(United Kingdom) RLR MSport	(Denmark) Malthe Jakobsen	2:03.776	8
9	LMP3	63	(Luxembourg) DKR Engineering	(Germany) Laurents Hörr	2:03.953	9
10	LMP3	33	(Spain) CD Sport	(France) Adam Eteki	2:04.065	10
11	LMP3	3	(United Kingdom) United Autosports	(United Kingdom) Duncan Tappy	2:04.225	11
12	LMP3	8	(United Kingdom) Nielsen Racing	(United Kingdom) Matthew Bell	2:04.380	12
13	LMP3	9	(United Kingdom) Nielsen Racing	(United Kingdom) Colin Noble	2:04.424	13
14	LMP3	2	(United Kingdom) United Autosports	(United Kingdom) Andy Meyrick	2:04.583	14
15	LMP3	44	(Slovakia) ARC Bratislava	(United Kingdom) Charlie Robertson	2:06.480	15
16	LMP3	4	(Germany) Phoenix-IronForce Racing	(Germany) Leo Weiss	2:07.333	16
17	**GT**	**1**	**(Chinese Taipei) HubAuto Racing**	**(Italy) Raffaele Marciello**	**2:07.586**	17
18	GT	51	(Italy) AF Corse	(Italy) Alessandro Pier Guidi	2:07.689	18
19	GT	93	(Germany) Precote Herberth Motorsport	(Austria) Klaus Bachler	2:07.738	19
20	GT	88	(United Kingdom) Garage 59	(Belgium) Maxime Martin	2:07.795	20
21	GT	55	(Germany) Rinaldi Racing	(Italy) Davide Rigon	2:07.832	21
22	GT	40	(United Arab Emirates) GPX Racing	(France) Julien Andlauer	2:07.894	22
23	GT	89	(United Kingdom) Garage 59	(Germany) Marvin Kirchhöfer	2:07.911	23
24	GT	99	(Germany) Precote Herberth Motorsport	(Germany) Robert Renauer	2:07.981	24
25	GT	97	Oman Racing Team with TF Sport	(United Kingdom) Jonathan Adam	2:08.006	25
26	GT	34	(Germany) Walkenhorst Motorsport	(Netherlands) Nicky Catsburg	2:08.017	26
27	GT	57	(Japan) Car Guy Racing	(France) Côme Ledogar	2:08.097	27
28	GT	7	(United Kingdom) Inception Racing with Optimum Motorsport	(United Kingdom) Ben Barnicoat	2:08.123	28
29	GT	77	(Japan) D'station Racing	(United Kingdom) Tom Gamble	2:08.224	29
30	GT	60	(Denmark) Formula Racing	(Denmark) Nicklas Nielsen	2:08.355	30
31	GT	95	(United Kingdom) TF Sport	(United Kingdom) Ollie Hancock	2:08.417	31
32	GT	66	(Germany) Rinaldi Racing	(Finland) Patrick Kujala	2:08.447	32
33	GT	54	(Italy) AF Corse	(Italy) Giancarlo Fisichella	2:08.740	33
34	GT	35	(Germany) Walkenhorst Motorsport	(Finland) Sami-Matti Trogen	2:09.184	34
35	GT	27	(Switzerland) Kessel Racing	(Italy) Giorgio Roda	2:10.480	35

=== Race ===
==== Race result ====
The minimum number of laps for classification (70% of overall winning car's distance) was 79 laps. Class winners are marked in bold.

Pos	Class	No.	Team	Drivers	Car	Tyres	Laps	Time/Gap
1	**LMP2**	**28**	**(United Kingdom) Jota**	**(Indonesia) Sean Gelael** **(United Kingdom) Tom Blomqvist**	**Oreca 07**	MI	**114**	**4:02:12.808**
2	LMP2	26	(Russia) G-Drive Racing	(Austria) René Binder (Austria) Ferdinand Habsburg (China) Yifei Ye	Aurus 01	MI	113	+1 Lap
3	LMP2	25	(Russia) G-Drive Racing	(Portugal) Rui Andrade (Argentina) Franco Colapinto (United States) John Falb	Aurus 01	MI	113	+1 Lap
4	LMP2	5	(Germany) Phoenix Racing	(Liechtenstein) Matthias Kaiser (Switzerland) Simon Trummer (South Africa) Kelvin van der Linde	Oreca 07	MI	112	+2 Laps
5	LMP2	64	Racing Team India	(India) Narain Karthikeyan (India) Arjun Maini (United States) Naveen Rao	Oreca 07	MI	111	+3 Laps
6	LMP2	18	(United States) Era Motorsport	(Greece) Andreas Laskaratos (United States) Dwight Merriman (United Kingdom) Kyle Tilley	Oreca 07	MI	109	+5 Laps
7	**LMP3**	**9**	**(United Kingdom) Nielsen Racing**	**(United Kingdom) Colin Noble** **(United Kingdom) Anthony Wells**	**Ligier JS P320**	MI	**106**	**+8 Laps**
8	LMP3	8	(United Kingdom) Nielsen Racing	(United Kingdom) Matthew Bell (United States) Rodrigo Sales	Ligier JS P320	MI	106	+8 Laps
9	LMP3	3	(United Kingdom) United Autosports	(United Kingdom) Andrew Bentley (United States) Jim McGuire (United Kingdom) Duncan Tappy	Ligier JS P320	MI	106	+8 Laps
10	LMP3	15	(United Kingdom) RLR MSport	(United States) Maxwell Hanratty (Denmark) Malthe Jakobsen (United Arab Emirates) Bashar Mardini	Ligier JS P320	MI	105	+9 Laps
11	**GT**	**40**	**(United Arab Emirates) GPX Racing**	**(France) Julien Andlauer** **(France) Alain Ferté** **(Zimbabwe) Axcil Jefferies**	**Porsche 911 GT3 R**	MI	**105**	**+9 Laps**
12	GT	99	(Germany) Precote Herberth Motorsport	(Germany) Ralf Bohn (Germany) Alfred Renauer (Germany) Robert Renauer	Porsche 911 GT3 R	MI	105	+9 Laps
13	LMP3	63	(Luxembourg) DKR Engineering	(Belgium) Jean Glorieux (Germany) Laurents Hörr	Duqueine M30 – D08	MI	105	+9 Laps
14	GT	60	(Denmark) Formula Racing	(Denmark) Johnny Laursen (Denmark) Nicklas Nielsen (Italy) Alessio Rovera	Ferrari 488 GT3	MI	105	+9 Laps
15	GT	55	(Germany) Rinaldi Racing	(Italy) Rino Mastronardi (South Africa) David Perel (Italy) Davide Rigon	Ferrari 488 GT3	MI	105	+9 Laps
16	GT	1	(Chinese Taipei) HubAuto Racing	(Brazil) Marcos Gomes (Italy) Raffaele Marciello (Australia) Liam Talbot	Mercedes-AMG GT3 Evo	MI	104	+10 Laps
17	GT	88	(United Kingdom) Garage 59	(France) Valentin Hasse-Clot (Belgium) Maxime Martin (Sweden) Alexander West	Aston Martin Vantage AMR GT3	MI	104	+10 Laps
18	GT	77	(Japan) D'station Racing	(Japan) Tomonobu Fujii (United Kingdom) Tom Gamble (Japan) Satoshi Hoshino	Aston Martin Vantage AMR GT3	MI	104	+10 Laps
19	GT	51	(Italy) AF Corse	(Italy) Alessandro Pier Guidi (Brazil) Oswaldo Negri Jr. (Puerto Rico) Francesco Piovanetti	Ferrari 488 GT3	MI	104	+10 Laps
20	GT	89	(United Kingdom) Garage 59	(United Kingdom) Mike Benham (Germany) Marvin Kirchhöfer (Japan) Yuki Nemoto	Aston Martin Vantage AMR GT3	MI	104	+10 Laps
21	GT	7	(United Kingdom) Inception Racing with Optimum Motorsport	(United Kingdom) Ben Barnicoat (United States) Brendan Iribe (United Kingdom) Ollie Millroy	McLaren 720S GT3	MI	104	+10 Laps
22	GT	54	(Italy) AF Corse	(Italy) Francesco Castellacci (Italy) Giancarlo Fisichella (Switzerland) Thomas Flohr	Ferrari 488 GT3	MI	104	+10 Laps
23	GT	93	(Germany) Precote Herberth Motorsport	(Hong Kong) Antares Au (Austria) Klaus Bachler (Germany) Steffen Görig	Porsche 911 GT3 R	MI	104	+10 Laps
24	GT	57	(Japan) Car Guy Racing	(Denmark) Mikkel Jensen (Japan) Takeshi Kimura (France) Côme Ledogar	Ferrari 488 GT3	MI	104	+10 Laps
25	GT	34	(Germany) Walkenhorst Motorsport	(Netherlands) Nicky Catsburg (United States) Chandler Hull (United States) Jon Miller	BMW M6 GT3	MI	103	+11 Laps
26	GT	66	(Germany) Rinaldi Racing	(Germany) Christian Hook (Finland) Patrick Kujala (Germany) Manuel Lauck	Ferrari 488 GT3	MI	103	+11 Laps
27	LMP3	44	(Slovakia) ARC Bratislava	(Belgium) Tom Cloet (Slovakia) Miroslav Konôpka (United Kingdom) Charlie Robertson	Ginetta G61-LT-P3	MI	103	+11 Laps
28	GT	95	(United Kingdom) TF Sport	(Republic of Ireland) Charlie Eastwood (United Kingdom) Ollie Hancock (United Kingdom) John Hartshorne	Aston Martin Vantage AMR GT3	MI	103	+11 Laps
29	GT	27	(Switzerland) Kessel Racing	(Germany) Tim Kohmann (Italy) Giorgio Roda (Italy) Francesco Zollo	Ferrari 488 GT3	MI	101	+13 Laps
30	GT	35	(Germany) Walkenhorst Motorsport	(Germany) Jörg Breuer (Finland) Sami-Matti Trogen (Germany) Henry Walkenhorst	BMW M6 GT3	MI	89	+25 Laps
Not Classified
DNF	LMP3	4	(Germany) Phoenix-IronForce Racing	(Germany) Jan-Erik Slooten (Germany) Leo Weiss	Ligier JS P320	MI	95	
DNF	GT	97	Oman Racing Team with TF Sport	(United Kingdom) Jonathan Adam (Oman) Ahmad Al Harthy (United Kingdom) Tom Canning	Aston Martin Vantage AMR GT3	MI	80	
DNF	LMP3	33	(Spain) CD Sport	(United Kingdom) Nick Adcock (France) Adam Eteki (Denmark) Michael Jensen	Ligier JS P320	MI	65	
DNF	LMP3	23	(United Kingdom) United Autosports	(United Kingdom) Wayne Boyd (Venezuela) Manuel Maldonado (Finland) Rory Penttinen	Ligier JS P320	MI	4	
DNF	LMP3	2	(United Kingdom) United Autosports	(United Kingdom) Robert Wheldon (United Kingdom) Ian Loggie (United Kingdom) Andy Meyrick	Ligier JS P320	MI	0	

==== Statistics ====
===== Fastest lap =====
Class	Driver	Team	Time	Lap
LMP2	(Austria) Ferdinand Habsburg	(Russia) #26 G-Drive Racing	1:56.889	61
LMP3	(Denmark) Malthe Jakobsen	(United Kingdom) #15 RLR MSport	2:05.165	12
GT	(Brazil) Marcos Gomes	(Chinese Taipei) #1 HubAuto Racing	2:09.249	45

== Race 2 ==
=== Qualifying ===
Pole positions in each class are indicated in bold.

Pos.	Class	No.	Entry	Driver	Time	Grid
1	**LMP2**	**26**	**(Russia) G-Drive Racing**	**(Austria) Ferdinand Habsburg**	**1:56.073**	1
2	LMP2	25	(Russia) G-Drive Racing	(Argentina) Franco Colapinto	1:56.136	2
3	LMP2	28	(United Kingdom) Jota	(Indonesia) Sean Gelael	1:56.302	6
4	LMP2	5	(Germany) Phoenix Racing	(South Africa) Kelvin van der Linde	1:56.466	3
5	LMP2	64	Racing Team India	(India) Arjun Maini	1:56.650	4
6	LMP2	18	(United States) Era Motorsport	(United Kingdom) Kyle Tilley	1:58.480	5
7	**LMP3**	**15**	**(United Kingdom) RLR MSport**	**(Denmark) Malthe Jakobsen**	**2:03.781**	7
8	LMP3	23	(United Kingdom) United Autosports	(United Kingdom) Wayne Boyd	2:03.792	8
9	LMP3	33	(Spain) CD Sport	(France) Adam Eteki	2:04.483	9
10	LMP3	2	(United Kingdom) United Autosports	(United Kingdom) Andy Meyrick	2:04.491	10
11	LMP3	8	(United Kingdom) Nielsen Racing	(United Kingdom) Matthew Bell	2:04.547	11
12	LMP3	3	(United Kingdom) United Autosports	(United Kingdom) Duncan Tappy	2:04.548	12
13	LMP3	9	(United Kingdom) Nielsen Racing	(United Kingdom) Colin Noble	2:04.904	13
14	LMP3	44	(Slovakia) ARC Bratislava	(United Kingdom) Charlie Robertson	2:06.490	14
15	LMP3	4	(Germany) Phoenix-IronForce Racing	(Germany) Leo Weiss	2:07.010	15
16	**GT**	**1**	**(Chinese Taipei) HubAuto Racing**	**(Italy) Raffaele Marciello**	**2:07.688**	16
17	GT	40	(United Arab Emirates) GPX Racing	(France) Julien Andlauer	2:07.824	17
18	GT	89	(United Kingdom) Garage 59	(Germany) Marvin Kirchhöfer	2:07.844	18
19	GT	55	(Germany) Rinaldi Racing	(Italy) Davide Rigon	2:07.895	19
20	GT	93	(Germany) Precote Herberth Motorsport	(Austria) Klaus Bachler	2:07.902	20
21	GT	51	(Italy) AF Corse	(Italy) Alessandro Pier Guidi	2:07.905	21
22	GT	7	(United Kingdom) Inception Racing with Optimum Motorsport	(United Kingdom) Ben Barnicoat	2:08.090	22
23	GT	97	Oman Racing Team with TF Sport	(United Kingdom) Jonathan Adam	2:08.097	23
24	GT	66	(Germany) Rinaldi Racing	(Finland) Patrick Kujala	2:08.118	24
25	GT	88	(United Kingdom) Garage 59	(Belgium) Maxime Martin	2:08.206	25
26	GT	99	(Germany) Precote Herberth Motorsport	(Germany) Robert Renauer	2:08.255	26
27	GT	77	(Japan) D'station Racing	(United Kingdom) Tom Gamble	2:08.307	27
28	GT	34	(Germany) Walkenhorst Motorsport	(Netherlands) Nicky Catsburg	2:08.572	28
29	LMP3	63	(Luxembourg) DKR Engineering	(Germany) Laurents Hörr	2:08.587	29
30	GT	60	(Denmark) Formula Racing	(Denmark) Nicklas Nielsen	2:08.603	30
31	GT	95	(United Kingdom) TF Sport	(United Kingdom) Ollie Hancock	2:08.672	31
32	GT	54	(Italy) AF Corse	(Italy) Giancarlo Fisichella	2:08.989	32
33	GT	35	(Germany) Walkenhorst Motorsport	(Finland) Sami-Matti Trogen	2:09.309	33
34	GT	27	(Switzerland) Kessel Racing	(Italy) Giorgio Roda	2:10.094	34
35	GT	57	(Japan) Car Guy Racing	—		35

=== Race ===
==== Race result ====
The minimum number of laps for classification (70% of overall winning car's distance) was 78 laps. Class winners are marked in bold.

Pos	Class	No.	Team	Drivers	Car	Tyres	Laps	Time/Gap
1	**LMP2**	**28**	**(United Kingdom) Jota**	**(Indonesia) Sean Gelael** **(United Kingdom) Tom Blomqvist**	**Oreca 07**	MI	**112**	**4:03:34.502**
2	LMP2	25	(Russia) G-Drive Racing	(Portugal) Rui Andrade (Argentina) Franco Colapinto (United States) John Falb	Aurus 01	MI	112	+0.422
3	LMP2	5	(Germany) Phoenix Racing	(Liechtenstein) Matthias Kaiser (Switzerland) Simon Trummer (South Africa) Kelvin van der Linde	Oreca 07	MI	112	+23.656
4	LMP2	26	(Russia) G-Drive Racing	(Austria) René Binder (Austria) Ferdinand Habsburg (China) Yifei Ye	Aurus 01	MI	112	+37.897
5	LMP2	64	Racing Team India	(India) Narain Karthikeyan (India) Arjun Maini (United States) Naveen Rao	Oreca 07	MI	111	+1 Lap
6	**LMP3**	**23**	**(United Kingdom) United Autosports**	**(United Kingdom) Wayne Boyd** **(Venezuela) Manuel Maldonado** **(Finland) Rory Penttinen**	**Ligier JS P320**	MI	**106**	**+6 Laps**
7	LMP3	3	(United Kingdom) United Autosports	(United Kingdom) Andrew Bentley (United States) Jim McGuire (United Kingdom) Duncan Tappy	Ligier JS P320	MI	106	+6 Laps
8	LMP3	2	(United Kingdom) United Autosports	(United Kingdom) Robert Wheldon (United Kingdom) Ian Loggie (United Kingdom) Andy Meyrick	Ligier JS P320	MI	106	+6 Laps
9	LMP3	33	(Spain) CD Sport	(United Kingdom) Nick Adcock (France) Adam Eteki (Denmark) Michael Jensen	Ligier JS P320	MI	106	+6 Laps
10	LMP3	63	(Luxembourg) DKR Engineering	(Belgium) Jean Glorieux (Germany) Laurents Hörr	Duqueine M30 – D08	MI	106	+6 Laps
11	LMP3	9	(United Kingdom) Nielsen Racing	(United Kingdom) Colin Noble (United Kingdom) Anthony Wells	Ligier JS P320	MI	106	+6 Laps
12	LMP3	8	(United Kingdom) Nielsen Racing	(United Kingdom) Matthew Bell (United States) Rodrigo Sales	Ligier JS P320	MI	106	+6 Laps
13	**GT**	**57**	**(Japan) Car Guy Racing**	**(Denmark) Mikkel Jensen** **(Japan) Takeshi Kimura** **(France) Côme Ledogar**	**Ferrari 488 GT3**	MI	**105**	**+7 Laps**
14	GT	7	(United Kingdom) Inception Racing with Optimum Motorsport	(United Kingdom) Ben Barnicoat (United States) Brendan Iribe (United Kingdom) Ollie Millroy	McLaren 720S GT3	MI	104	+8 Laps
15	GT	55	(Germany) Rinaldi Racing	(Italy) Rino Mastronardi (South Africa) David Perel (Italy) Davide Rigon	Ferrari 488 GT3	MI	104	+8 Laps
16	GT	97	Oman Racing Team with TF Sport	(United Kingdom) Jonathan Adam (Oman) Ahmad Al Harthy (United Kingdom) Tom Canning	Aston Martin Vantage AMR GT3	MI	104	+8 Laps
17	GT	99	(Germany) Precote Herberth Motorsport	(Germany) Ralf Bohn (Germany) Alfred Renauer (Germany) Robert Renauer	Porsche 911 GT3 R	MI	104	+8 Laps
18	GT	95	(United Kingdom) TF Sport	(Republic of Ireland) Charlie Eastwood (United Kingdom) Ollie Hancock (United Kingdom) John Hartshorne	Aston Martin Vantage AMR GT3	MI	104	+8 Laps
19	LMP3	4	(Germany) Phoenix-IronForce Racing	(Germany) Jan-Erik Slooten (Germany) Leo Weiss	Ligier JS P320	MI	104	+8 Laps
20	GT	77	(Japan) D'station Racing	(Japan) Tomonobu Fujii (United Kingdom) Tom Gamble (Japan) Satoshi Hoshino	Aston Martin Vantage AMR GT3	MI	104	+8 Laps
21	GT	1	(Chinese Taipei) HubAuto Racing	(Brazil) Marcos Gomes (Italy) Raffaele Marciello (Australia) Liam Talbot	Mercedes-AMG GT3 Evo	MI	104	+8 Laps
22	GT	88	(United Kingdom) Garage 59	(France) Valentin Hasse-Clot (Belgium) Maxime Martin (Sweden) Alexander West	Aston Martin Vantage AMR GT3	MI	104	+8 Laps
23	GT	89	(United Kingdom) Garage 59	(United Kingdom) Mike Benham (Germany) Marvin Kirchhöfer (Japan) Yuki Nemoto	Aston Martin Vantage AMR GT3	MI	104	+8 Laps
24	GT	34	(Germany) Walkenhorst Motorsport	(Netherlands) Nicky Catsburg (United States) Chandler Hull (United States) Jon Miller	BMW M6 GT3	MI	104	+8 Laps
25	GT	35	(Germany) Walkenhorst Motorsport	(Germany) Jörg Breuer (Finland) Sami-Matti Trogen (Germany) Henry Walkenhorst	BMW M6 GT3	MI	103	+9 Laps
26	GT	93	(Germany) Precote Herberth Motorsport	(Hong Kong) Antares Au (Austria) Klaus Bachler (Germany) Steffen Görig	Porsche 911 GT3 R	MI	103	+9 Laps
27	LMP2	18	(United States) Era Motorsport	(Greece) Andreas Laskaratos (United States) Dwight Merriman (United Kingdom) Kyle Tilley	Oreca 07	MI	103	+9 Laps
28	GT	40	(United Arab Emirates) GPX Racing	(France) Julien Andlauer (France) Alain Ferté (Zimbabwe) Axcil Jefferies	Porsche 911 GT3 R	MI	102	+10 Laps
29	LMP3	44	(Slovakia) ARC Bratislava	(Belgium) Tom Cloet (Slovakia) Miroslav Konôpka (United Kingdom) Charlie Robertson	Ginetta G61-LT-P3	MI	99	+13 Laps
30	GT	27	(Switzerland) Kessel Racing	(Germany) Tim Kohmann (Italy) Giorgio Roda (Italy) Francesco Zollo	Ferrari 488 GT3	MI	97	+15 Laps
Not Classified
DNF	LMP3	15	(United Kingdom) RLR MSport	(United States) Maxwell Hanratty (Denmark) Malthe Jakobsen (United Arab Emirates) Bashar Mardini	Ligier JS P320	MI	59	
DNF	GT	51	(Italy) AF Corse	(Italy) Alessandro Pier Guidi (Brazil) Oswaldo Negri Jr. (Puerto Rico) Francesco Piovanetti	Ferrari 488 GT3	MI	12	
DNF	GT	54	(Italy) AF Corse	(Italy) Francesco Castellacci (Italy) Giancarlo Fisichella (Switzerland) Thomas Flohr	Ferrari 488 GT3	MI	12	
DNF	GT	66	(Germany) Rinaldi Racing	(Germany) Christian Hook (Finland) Patrick Kujala (Germany) Manuel Lauck	Ferrari 488 GT3	MI	5	
DNF	GT	60	(Denmark) Formula Racing	(Denmark) Johnny Laursen (Denmark) Nicklas Nielsen (Italy) Alessio Rovera	Ferrari 488 GT3	MI	3	

==== Statistics ====
===== Fastest lap =====
Class	Driver	Team	Time	Lap
LMP2	(Argentina) Franco Colapinto	(Russia) #25 G-Drive Racing	1:56.560	88
LMP3	(France) Adam Eteki	(Spain) #33 CD Sport	2:05.275	60
GT	(United Kingdom) Ben Barnicoat	(United Kingdom) #7 Inception Racing with Optimum Motorsport	2:08.791	88
