= 2021 4 Hours of Dubai =

Endurance sportscar racing event

The Grand Prix layout of the Dubai Autodrome

The 2021 4 Hours of Dubai was an endurance sportscar racing event held between 11 and 14 February 2021, as the first and second round of 2021 Asian Le Mans Series season. This was the first running of the event as part of the Asian Le Mans Series.

The weekend was dominated by the #26 G-Drive Racing Aurus 01 driven by René Binder, Ferdinand Habsburg and Yifei Ye, who won both rounds of the 4 Hours of Dubai. The LMP3 class was also swept by the #23 United Autosports entry driven by Wayne Boyd, Manuel Maldonado and Rory Penttinen. In GT, the #99 Precote Herberth Motorsport Porsche 911 GT3 R driven by Ralf Bohn, Alfred Renauer and Robert Renauer, converted a race 1 pole to a win and the #40 GPX Racing Porsche 911 GT3 R driven by Julien Andlauer, Alain Ferté and Axcil Jefferies took race 2 class honors.

== Entry list ==
The initial entry list was published on 3 February and consisted of 36 entries across 3 categories – 7 in LMP2, 10 in LMP3, and 19 in GT. On 7 February, a revised entry list was released with the remaining drivers of the #23 United Autosports Ligier JS P320 announced. Joining Manuel Maldonado to fill the lineup was Wayne Boyd and Rory Penttinen. Further changes were made on 9 February when the teams arrived at the track. In GT, Sami-Matti Trogen joined the #35 Walkenhorst BMW M6 GT3 entry and Alessio Rovera replaced Frederick Paulsen in the #60 Formula Racing Ferrari 488 GT3 due to COVID-19 quarantine problems for Paulsen.

== Schedule ==
Date	Time (local: GST)	Event
Thursday, 11 February	17:45	Free Practice
Friday, 12 February	9:55	Qualifying
Saturday, 13 February	14:15	Race 1
Sunday, 14 February	12:45	Race 2

== Free practice ==
- Only the fastest car in each class is shown.

Free Practice	Class	No.	Entrant	Time
Free Practice	LMP2	5	(Germany) Phoenix Racing	1:45.487
Free Practice	LMP3	3	(United Kingdom) United Autosports	1:53.238
Free Practice	GT	51	(Italy) AF Corse	1:56.929

== Race 1 ==
=== Qualifying ===
Pole positions in each class are indicated in bold.

Pos.	Class	No.	Entry	Driver	Time	Grid
1	**LMP2**	**25**	**(Russia) G-Drive Racing**	**(Argentina) Franco Colapinto**	**1:43.616**	1
2	LMP2	26	(Russia) G-Drive Racing	(China) Yifei Ye	1:43.885	2
3	LMP2	5	(Germany) Phoenix Racing	(Denmark) Nicki Thiim	1:44.072	3
4	LMP2	28	(United Kingdom) Jota	(Indonesia) Sean Gelael	1:44.386	4
5	LMP2	64	Racing Team India	(India) Narain Karthikeyan	1:45.025	5
6	LMP2	18	(United States) Era Motorsport	(United Kingdom) Kyle Tilley	1:46.469	6
7	LMP2	11	(Italy) EuroInternational – Ojets	(Australia) John Corbett	1:48.863	7
8	**LMP3**	**23**	**(United Kingdom) United Autosports**	**(United Kingdom) Wayne Boyd**	**1:51.418**	8
9	LMP3	3	(United Kingdom) United Autosports	(United Kingdom) Duncan Tappy	1:51.425	9
10	LMP3	33	(Spain) CD Sport	(France) Adam Eteki	1:52.056	10
11	LMP3	15	(United Kingdom) RLR MSport	(Denmark) Malthe Jakobsen	1:52.471	11
12	LMP3	63	(Luxembourg) DKR Engineering	(Germany) Laurents Hörr	1:52.528	12
13	LMP3	9	(United Kingdom) Nielsen Racing	(United Kingdom) Colin Noble	1:52.572	13
14	LMP3	2	(United Kingdom) United Autosports	(United Kingdom) Andy Meyrick	1:52.743	14
15	LMP3	8	(United Kingdom) Nielsen Racing	(United Kingdom) Matthew Bell	1:53.043	15
16	LMP3	4	(Germany) Phoenix-IronForce Racing	(Germany) Leo Weiss	1:53.085	16
17	LMP3	44	(Slovakia) ARC Bratislava	(United Kingdom) Charlie Robertson	1:53.329	17
18	**GT**	**99**	**(Germany) Precote Herberth Motorsport**	**(Germany) Robert Renauer**	**1:55.552**	18
19	GT	40	(United Arab Emirates) GPX Racing	(France) Julien Andlauer	1:55.566	19
20	GT	93	(Germany) Precote Herberth Motorsport	(Austria) Klaus Bachler	1:55.866	20
21	GT	95	(United Kingdom) TF Sport	(Republic of Ireland) Charlie Eastwood	1:56.101	21
22	GT	1	(Chinese Taipei) HubAuto Racing	(Italy) Raffaele Marciello	1:56.214	22
23	GT	88	(United Kingdom) Garage 59	(Belgium) Maxime Martin	1:56.284	23
24	GT	51	(Italy) AF Corse	(Italy) Alessandro Pier Guidi	1:56.349	24
25	GT	7	(United Kingdom) Inception Racing with Optimum Motorsport	(United Kingdom) Ben Barnicoat	1:56.415	25
26	GT	89	(United Kingdom) Garage 59	(Germany) Marvin Kirchhöfer	1:56.517	26
27	GT	97	Oman Racing Team with TF Sport	(United Kingdom) Jonathan Adam	1:56.603	27
28	GT	57	(Japan) Car Guy Racing	(France) Côme Ledogar	1:56.685	28
29	GT	60	(Denmark) Formula Racing	(Denmark) Nicklas Nielsen	1:56.859	29
30	GT	55	(Germany) Rinaldi Racing	(Italy) Davide Rigon	1:57.134	30
31	GT	54	(Italy) AF Corse	(Italy) Francesco Castellacci	1:57.237	31
32	GT	35	(Germany) Walkenhorst Motorsport	(Finland) Sami-Matti Trogen	1:57.274	32
33	GT	27	(Switzerland) Kessel Racing	(Italy) Giorgio Roda	1:57.502	33
34	GT	77	(Japan) D'station Racing	(Japan) Tomonobu Fujii	1:57.662	34
35	GT	34	(Germany) Walkenhorst Motorsport	(United States) Chandler Hull	1:58.157	35
36	GT	66	(Germany) Rinaldi Racing	—		36

=== Race ===
==== Race result ====
The minimum number of laps for classification (70% of overall winning car's distance) was 88 laps. Class winners are marked in bold.

Pos	Class	No.	Team	Drivers	Car	Tyres	Laps	Time/Gap
1	**LMP2**	**26**	**(Russia) G-Drive Racing**	**(Austria) René Binder** **(Austria) Ferdinand Habsburg** **(China) Yifei Ye**	**Aurus 01**	MI	**127**	**4:02:26.692**
2	LMP2	28	(United Kingdom) Jota	(Indonesia) Sean Gelael (Belgium) Stoffel Vandoorne	Oreca 07	MI	126	+1 Lap
3	LMP2	5	(Germany) Phoenix Racing	(Liechtenstein) Matthias Kaiser (Switzerland) Simon Trummer (Denmark) Nicki Thiim	Oreca 07	MI	126	+1 Lap
4	LMP2	25	(Russia) G-Drive Racing	(Portugal) Rui Andrade (Argentina) Franco Colapinto (United States) John Falb	Aurus 01	MI	125	+2 Laps
5	LMP2	64	Racing Team India	(India) Narain Karthikeyan (India) Arjun Maini (United States) Naveen Rao	Oreca 07	MI	124	+3 Laps
6	LMP2	18	(United States) Era Motorsport	(Greece) Andreas Laskaratos (United States) Dwight Merriman (United Kingdom) Kyle Tilley	Oreca 07	MI	123	+4 Laps
7	LMP2	11	(Italy) EuroInternational – Ojets	(Australia) John Corbett (Australia) Neale Muston	Ligier JS P217	MI	120	+7 Laps
8	**LMP3**	**23**	**(United Kingdom) United Autosports**	**(United Kingdom) Wayne Boyd** **(Venezuela) Manuel Maldonado** **(Finland) Rory Penttinen**	**Ligier JS P320**	MI	**119**	**+8 Laps**
9	LMP3	9	(United Kingdom) Nielsen Racing	(United Kingdom) Colin Noble (United Kingdom) Anthony Wells	Ligier JS P320	MI	118	+9 Laps
10	LMP3	3	(United Kingdom) United Autosports	(United Kingdom) Andrew Bentley (United States) Jim McGuire (United Kingdom) Duncan Tappy	Ligier JS P320	MI	118	+9 Laps
11	LMP3	2	(United Kingdom) United Autosports	(United Kingdom) Robert Wheldon (United Kingdom) Ian Loggie (United Kingdom) Andy Meyrick	Ligier JS P320	MI	118	+9 Laps
12	LMP3	4	(Germany) Phoenix-IronForce Racing	(Germany) Jan-Erik Slooten (Germany) Leo Weiss	Ligier JS P320	MI	117	+10 Laps
13	**GT**	**99**	**(Germany) Precote Herberth Motorsport**	**(Germany) Ralf Bohn** **(Germany) Alfred Renauer** **(Germany) Robert Renauer**	**Porsche 911 GT3 R**	MI	**117**	**+10 Laps**
14	LMP3	15	(United Kingdom) RLR MSport	(United States) Maxwell Hanratty (Denmark) Malthe Jakobsen (United Arab Emirates) Bashar Mardini	Ligier JS P320	MI	117	+10 Laps
15	GT	7	(United Kingdom) Inception Racing with Optimum Motorsport	(United Kingdom) Ben Barnicoat (United States) Brendan Iribe (United Kingdom) Ollie Millroy	McLaren 720S GT3	MI	116	+11 Laps
16	GT	34	(Germany) Walkenhorst Motorsport	(Netherlands) Nicky Catsburg (United States) Chandler Hull (United States) Jon Miller	BMW M6 GT3	MI	116	+11 Laps
17	GT	40	(United Arab Emirates) GPX Racing	(France) Julien Andlauer (France) Alain Ferté (Zimbabwe) Axcil Jefferies	Porsche 911 GT3 R	MI	116	+11 Laps
18	GT	88	(United Kingdom) Garage 59	(France) Valentin Hasse-Clot (Belgium) Maxime Martin (Sweden) Alexander West	Aston Martin Vantage AMR GT3	MI	116	+11 Laps
19	GT	60	(Denmark) Formula Racing	(Denmark) Johnny Laursen (Denmark) Nicklas Nielsen (Italy) Alessio Rovera	Ferrari 488 GT3	MI	116	+11 Laps
20	GT	97	Oman Racing Team with TF Sport	(United Kingdom) Jonathan Adam (Oman) Ahmad Al Harthy (United Kingdom) Tom Canning	Aston Martin Vantage AMR GT3	MI	116	+11 Laps
21	GT	55	(Germany) Rinaldi Racing	(Italy) Rino Mastronardi (South Africa) David Perel (Italy) Davide Rigon	Ferrari 488 GT3	MI	116	+11 Laps
22	GT	57	(Japan) Car Guy Racing	(Denmark) Mikkel Jensen (Japan) Takeshi Kimura (France) Côme Ledogar	Ferrari 488 GT3	MI	116	+11 Laps
23	GT	95	(United Kingdom) TF Sport	(Republic of Ireland) Charlie Eastwood (United Kingdom) Ollie Hancock (United Kingdom) John Hartshorne	Aston Martin Vantage AMR GT3	MI	115	+12 Laps
24	GT	54	(Italy) AF Corse	(Italy) Francesco Castellacci (Italy) Giancarlo Fisichella (Switzerland) Thomas Flohr	Ferrari 488 GT3	MI	115	+12 Laps
25	GT	66	(Germany) Rinaldi Racing	(Germany) Christian Hook (Finland) Patrick Kujala (Germany) Manuel Lauck	Ferrari 488 GT3	MI	115	+12 Laps
26	GT	77	(Japan) D'station Racing	(Japan) Tomonobu Fujii (United Kingdom) Tom Gamble (Japan) Satoshi Hoshino	Aston Martin Vantage AMR GT3	MI	115	+12 Laps
27	GT	51	(Italy) AF Corse	(Italy) Alessandro Pier Guidi (Brazil) Oswaldo Negri Jr. (Puerto Rico) Francesco Piovanetti	Ferrari 488 GT3	MI	115	+12 Laps
28	GT	93	(Germany) Precote Herberth Motorsport	(Hong Kong) Antares Au (Austria) Klaus Bachler (Germany) Steffen Görig	Porsche 911 GT3 R	MI	115	+12 Laps
29	GT	35	(Germany) Walkenhorst Motorsport	(Germany) Jörg Breuer (Finland) Sami-Matti Trogen (Germany) Henry Walkenhorst	BMW M6 GT3	MI	114	+13 Laps
30	GT	89	(United Kingdom) Garage 59	(United Kingdom) Mike Benham (Germany) Marvin Kirchhöfer (Japan) Yuki Nemoto	Aston Martin Vantage AMR GT3	MI	114	+13 Laps
31	GT	27	(Switzerland) Kessel Racing	(Germany) Tim Kohmann (Italy) Giorgio Roda (Italy) Francesco Zollo	Ferrari 488 GT3	MI	114	+13 Laps
32	LMP3	33	(Spain) CD Sport	(United Kingdom) Nick Adcock (France) Adam Eteki (Denmark) Michael Jensen	Ligier JS P320	MI	109	+18 Laps
Not Classified
DNF	GT	1	(Chinese Taipei) HubAuto Racing	(Brazil) Marcos Gomes (Italy) Raffaele Marciello (Australia) Liam Talbot	Mercedes-AMG GT3 Evo	MI	102	
DNF	LMP3	44	(Slovakia) ARC Bratislava	(Belgium) Tom Cloet (Slovakia) Miroslav Konôpka (United Kingdom) Charlie Robertson	Ginetta G61-LT-P3	MI	95	
DNF	LMP3	8	(United Kingdom) Nielsen Racing	(United Kingdom) Matthew Bell (United States) Rodrigo Sales	Ligier JS P320	MI	43	
DNF	LMP3	63	(Luxembourg) DKR Engineering	(Belgium) Jean Glorieux (Germany) Laurents Hörr	Duqueine M30 – D08	MI	39	

==== Statistics ====
===== Fastest lap =====
Class	Driver	Team	Time	Lap
LMP2	(Argentina) Franco Colapinto	(Russia) #25 G-Drive Racing	1:46.723	85
LMP3	(United Kingdom) Colin Noble	(United Kingdom) #9 Nielsen Racing	1:54.938	63
GT	(France) Julien Andlauer	(United Arab Emirates) #40 GPX Racing	1:57.479	3

== Race 2 ==
=== Qualifying ===
Pole positions in each class are indicated in bold.

Pos.	Class	No.	Entry	Driver	Time	Grid
1	**LMP2**	**25**	**(Russia) G-Drive Racing**	**(Argentina) Franco Colapinto**	**1:43.885**	1
2	LMP2	26	(Russia) G-Drive Racing	(China) Yifei Ye	1:43.949	2
3	LMP2	28	(United Kingdom) Jota	(Indonesia) Sean Gelael	1:44.442	3
4	LMP2	5	(Germany) Phoenix Racing	(Denmark) Nicki Thiim	1:44.543	4
5	LMP2	64	Racing Team India	(India) Narain Karthikeyan	1:45.684	5
6	LMP2	18	(United States) Era Motorsport	(United Kingdom) Kyle Tilley	1:46.543	6
7	LMP2	11	(Italy) EuroInternational – Ojets	(Australia) John Corbett	1:49.372	7
8	**LMP3**	**23**	**(United Kingdom) United Autosports**	**(United Kingdom) Wayne Boyd**	**1:51.503**	8
9	LMP3	3	(United Kingdom) United Autosports	(United Kingdom) Duncan Tappy	1:51.614	9
10	LMP3	33	(Spain) CD Sport	(France) Adam Eteki	1:52.145	10
11	LMP3	63	(Luxembourg) DKR Engineering	(Germany) Laurents Hörr	1:52.700	11
12	LMP3	15	(United Kingdom) RLR MSport	(Denmark) Malthe Jakobsen	1:52.824	12
13	LMP3	9	(United Kingdom) Nielsen Racing	(United Kingdom) Colin Noble	1:52.838	13
14	LMP3	2	(United Kingdom) United Autosports	(United Kingdom) Andy Meyrick	1:52.978	14
15	LMP3	4	(Germany) Phoenix-IronForce Racing	(Germany) Leo Weiss	1:53.138	15
16	LMP3	8	(United Kingdom) Nielsen Racing	(United Kingdom) Matthew Bell	1:53.232	16
17	LMP3	44	(Slovakia) ARC Bratislava	(Slovakia) Miroslav Konôpka	1:53.618	17
18	**GT**	**93**	**(Germany) Precote Herberth Motorsport**	**(Austria) Klaus Bachler**	**1:55.918**	18
19	GT	40	(United Arab Emirates) GPX Racing	(France) Julien Andlauer	1:55.965	19
20	GT	99	(Germany) Precote Herberth Motorsport	(Germany) Robert Renauer	1:56.015	20
21	GT	88	(United Kingdom) Garage 59	(Belgium) Maxime Martin	1:56.355	21
22	GT	51	(Italy) AF Corse	(Italy) Alessandro Pier Guidi	1:56.357	22
23	GT	1	(Chinese Taipei) HubAuto Racing	(Italy) Raffaele Marciello	1:56.434	23
24	GT	95	(United Kingdom) TF Sport	(Republic of Ireland) Charlie Eastwood	1:56.474	24
25	GT	97	Oman Racing Team with TF Sport	(United Kingdom) Jonathan Adam	1:56.835	25
26	GT	60	(Denmark) Formula Racing	(Denmark) Nicklas Nielsen	1:56.869	26
27	GT	89	(United Kingdom) Garage 59	(Germany) Marvin Kirchhöfer	1:56.960	27
28	GT	57	(Japan) Car Guy Racing	(France) Côme Ledogar	1:56.965	28
29	GT	54	(Italy) AF Corse	(Italy) Francesco Castellacci	1:57.287	29
30	GT	35	(Germany) Walkenhorst Motorsport	(Finland) Sami-Matti Trogen	1:57.311	30
31	GT	77	(Japan) D'station Racing	(Japan) Tomonobu Fujii	1:57.720	31
32	GT	27	(Switzerland) Kessel Racing	(Italy) Giorgio Roda	1:58.015	32
33	GT	34	(Germany) Walkenhorst Motorsport	(United States) Chandler Hull	1:58.515	33
34	GT	7	(United Kingdom) Inception Racing with Optimum Motorsport	—		34
35	GT	55	(Germany) Rinaldi Racing	—		35
36	GT	66	(Germany) Rinaldi Racing	—		36

=== Race ===
==== Race result ====
The minimum number of laps for classification (70% of overall winning car's distance) was 87 laps. Class winners are marked in bold.

Pos	Class	No.	Team	Drivers	Car	Tyres	Laps	Time/Gap
1	**LMP2**	**26**	**(Russia) G-Drive Racing**	**(Austria) René Binder** **(Austria) Ferdinand Habsburg** **(China) Yifei Ye**	**Aurus 01**	MI	**125**	**4:03:13.632**
2	LMP2	25	(Russia) G-Drive Racing	(Portugal) Rui Andrade (Argentina) Franco Colapinto (United States) John Falb	Aurus 01	MI	125	+45.459
3	LMP2	5	(Germany) Phoenix Racing	(Liechtenstein) Matthias Kaiser (Switzerland) Simon Trummer (Denmark) Nicki Thiim	Oreca 07	MI	125	+59.745
4	LMP2	64	Racing Team India	(India) Narain Karthikeyan (India) Arjun Maini (United States) Naveen Rao	Oreca 07	MI	124	+1 Lap
5	LMP2	18	(United States) Era Motorsport	(Greece) Andreas Laskaratos (United States) Dwight Merriman (United Kingdom) Kyle Tilley	Oreca 07	MI	120	+5 Laps
6	LMP2	28	(United Kingdom) Jota	(Indonesia) Sean Gelael (Belgium) Stoffel Vandoorne	Oreca 07	MI	118	+7 Laps
7	**LMP3**	**23**	**(United Kingdom) United Autosports**	**(United Kingdom) Wayne Boyd** **(Venezuela) Manuel Maldonado** **(Finland) Rory Penttinen**	**Ligier JS P320**	MI	**117**	**+8 Laps**
8	LMP3	2	(United Kingdom) United Autosports	(United Kingdom) Robert Wheldon (United Kingdom) Ian Loggie (United Kingdom) Andy Meyrick	Ligier JS P320	MI	117	+8 Laps
9	LMP3	8	(United Kingdom) Nielsen Racing	(United Kingdom) Matthew Bell (United States) Rodrigo Sales	Ligier JS P320	MI	117	+8 Laps
10	LMP3	63	(Luxembourg) DKR Engineering	(Belgium) Jean Glorieux (Germany) Laurents Hörr	Duqueine M30 – D08	MI	117	+8 Laps
11	LMP3	3	(United Kingdom) United Autosports	(United Kingdom) Andrew Bentley (United States) Jim McGuire (United Kingdom) Duncan Tappy	Ligier JS P320	MI	116	+9 Laps
12	LMP3	33	(Spain) CD Sport	(United Kingdom) Nick Adcock (France) Adam Eteki (Denmark) Michael Jensen	Ligier JS P320	MI	116	+9 Laps
13	LMP3	15	(United Kingdom) RLR MSport	(United States) Maxwell Hanratty (Denmark) Malthe Jakobsen (United Arab Emirates) Bashar Mardini	Ligier JS P320	MI	115	+10 Laps
14	**GT**	**40**	**(United Arab Emirates) GPX Racing**	**(France) Julien Andlauer** **(France) Alain Ferté** **(Zimbabwe) Axcil Jefferies**	**Porsche 911 GT3 R**	MI	**115**	**+10 Laps**
15	GT	55	(Germany) Rinaldi Racing	(Italy) Rino Mastronardi (South Africa) David Perel (Italy) Davide Rigon	Ferrari 488 GT3	MI	114	+11 Laps
16	GT	88	(United Kingdom) Garage 59	(France) Valentin Hasse-Clot (Belgium) Maxime Martin (Sweden) Alexander West	Aston Martin Vantage AMR GT3	MI	114	+11 Laps
17	GT	1	(Chinese Taipei) HubAuto Racing	(Brazil) Marcos Gomes (Italy) Raffaele Marciello (Australia) Liam Talbot	Mercedes-AMG GT3 Evo	MI	114	+11 Laps
18	GT	99	(Germany) Precote Herberth Motorsport	(Germany) Ralf Bohn (Germany) Alfred Renauer (Germany) Robert Renauer	Porsche 911 GT3 R	MI	114	+11 Laps
19	GT	7	(United Kingdom) Inception Racing with Optimum Motorsport	(United Kingdom) Ben Barnicoat (United States) Brendan Iribe (United Kingdom) Ollie Millroy	McLaren 720S GT3	MI	114	+11 Laps
20	GT	97	Oman Racing Team with TF Sport	(United Kingdom) Jonathan Adam (Oman) Ahmad Al Harthy (United Kingdom) Tom Canning	Aston Martin Vantage AMR GT3	MI	114	+11 Laps
21	GT	57	(Japan) Car Guy Racing	(Denmark) Mikkel Jensen (Japan) Takeshi Kimura (France) Côme Ledogar	Ferrari 488 GT3	MI	114	+11 Laps
22	GT	93	(Germany) Precote Herberth Motorsport	(Hong Kong) Antares Au (Austria) Klaus Bachler (Germany) Steffen Görig	Porsche 911 GT3 R	MI	114	+11 Laps
23	GT	89	(United Kingdom) Garage 59	(United Kingdom) Mike Benham (Germany) Marvin Kirchhöfer (Japan) Yuki Nemoto	Aston Martin Vantage AMR GT3	MI	114	+11 Laps
24	GT	95	(United Kingdom) TF Sport	(Republic of Ireland) Charlie Eastwood (United Kingdom) Ollie Hancock (United Kingdom) John Hartshorne	Aston Martin Vantage AMR GT3	MI	113	+12 Laps
25	GT	54	(Italy) AF Corse	(Italy) Francesco Castellacci (Italy) Giancarlo Fisichella (Switzerland) Thomas Flohr	Ferrari 488 GT3	MI	113	+12 Laps
26	GT	77	(Japan) D'station Racing	(Japan) Tomonobu Fujii (United Kingdom) Tom Gamble (Japan) Satoshi Hoshino	Aston Martin Vantage AMR GT3	MI	113	+12 Laps
27	GT	51	(Italy) AF Corse	(Italy) Alessandro Pier Guidi (Brazil) Oswaldo Negri Jr. (Puerto Rico) Francesco Piovanetti	Ferrari 488 GT3	MI	112	+13 Laps
28	GT	66	(Germany) Rinaldi Racing	(Germany) Christian Hook (Finland) Patrick Kujala (Germany) Manuel Lauck	Ferrari 488 GT3	MI	112	+13 Laps
29	GT	60	(Denmark) Formula Racing	(Denmark) Johnny Laursen (Denmark) Nicklas Nielsen (Italy) Alessio Rovera	Ferrari 488 GT3	MI	112	+13 Laps
30	GT	27	(Switzerland) Kessel Racing	(Germany) Tim Kohmann (Italy) Giorgio Roda (Italy) Francesco Zollo	Ferrari 488 GT3	MI	112	+13 Laps
31	GT	35	(Germany) Walkenhorst Motorsport	(Germany) Jörg Breuer (Finland) Sami-Matti Trogen (Germany) Henry Walkenhorst	BMW M6 GT3	MI	112	+13 Laps
32	LMP3	44	(Slovakia) ARC Bratislava	(Belgium) Tom Cloet (Slovakia) Miroslav Konôpka (United Kingdom) Charlie Robertson	Ginetta G61-LT-P3	MI	111	+14 Laps
Not Classified
DNF	LMP3	9	(United Kingdom) Nielsen Racing	(United Kingdom) Colin Noble (United Kingdom) Anthony Wells	Ligier JS P320	MI	96	
DNF	LMP2	11	(Italy) EuroInternational – Ojets	(Australia) John Corbett (Australia) Neale Muston	Ligier JS P217	MI	19	
DNF	LMP3	4	(Germany) Phoenix-IronForce Racing	(Germany) Jan-Erik Slooten (Germany) Leo Weiss	Ligier JS P320	MI	13	
DNF	GT	34	(Germany) Walkenhorst Motorsport	(Netherlands) Nicky Catsburg (United States) Chandler Hull (United States) Jon Miller	BMW M6 GT3	MI	5	

==== Statistics ====
===== Fastest lap =====
Class	Driver	Team	Time	Lap
LMP2	(Argentina) Franco Colapinto	(Russia) #25 G-Drive Racing	1:46.306	107
LMP3	(Denmark) Malthe Jakobsen	(United Kingdom) #15 RLR MSport	1:54.497	6
GT	(Austria) Klaus Bachler	(Germany) #93 Precote Herberth Motorsport	1:58.190	26
