= 2021 Asian Le Mans Series =

Motorsport season

The 2021 Asian Le Mans Series was the ninth season of the Automobile Club de l'Ouest's Asian Le Mans Series. It is the fourth 24 Hours of Le Mans-based series created by the ACO, following the American Le Mans Series (since merged with the Rolex Sports Car Series to form the United SportsCar Championship), the European Le Mans Series and the FIA World Endurance Championship. The four-event season began at the Dubai Autodrome in Dubai on 13 February 2021 and ended at the Yas Marina Circuit in Abu Dhabi on 20 February 2021.

== Calendar ==
The calendar for the 2021 season was announced on 13 January 2021.

This Asian Le Mans Series season was run, in its entirety in the Middle East, in the United Arab Emirates at the Dubai Autodrome in Dubai and Yas Marina Circuit in Abu Dhabi in February 2021.

The season continued to comprise four four-hour length races. The races ran on the two circuits and combined night, day and twilight racing.

Rnd	Race	Circuit	Location	Date
1	4 Hours of Dubai	(United Arab Emirates) Dubai Autodrome	Dubailand, Dubai, UAE	13 February 2021
2	4 Hours of Dubai	(United Arab Emirates) Dubai Autodrome	Dubailand, Dubai, UAE	14 February 2021
3	4 Hours of Abu Dhabi	(United Arab Emirates) Yas Marina Circuit	Yas Island, Abu Dhabi, UAE	19 February 2021
4	4 Hours of Abu Dhabi	(United Arab Emirates) Yas Marina Circuit	Yas Island, Abu Dhabi, UAE	20 February 2021

== Entry list ==
=== LMP2 ===
Entrant/Team	Car	Engine	Class	No.	Drivers	Rounds
(Germany) Phoenix Racing	Oreca 07	Gibson GK428 4.2 L V8	P2	5	(Liechtenstein) Matthias Kaiser	All
(Germany) Phoenix Racing	Oreca 07	Gibson GK428 4.2 L V8	P2	5	(Switzerland) Simon Trummer	All
(Germany) Phoenix Racing	Oreca 07	Gibson GK428 4.2 L V8	P2	5	(Denmark) Nicki Thiim	1–2
(Germany) Phoenix Racing	Oreca 07	Gibson GK428 4.2 L V8	P2	5	(South Africa) Kelvin van der Linde	3–4
(Italy) EuroInternational – Ojets	Ligier JS P217	Gibson GK428 4.2 L V8	Am	11	(Australia) John Corbett	1–2
(Italy) EuroInternational – Ojets	Ligier JS P217	Gibson GK428 4.2 L V8	Am	11	(Australia) Neale Muston	1–2
(United States) Era Motorsport	Oreca 07	Gibson GK428 4.2 L V8	Am	18	(Greece) Andreas Laskaratos	All
(United States) Era Motorsport	Oreca 07	Gibson GK428 4.2 L V8	Am	18	(United States) Dwight Merriman	All
(United States) Era Motorsport	Oreca 07	Gibson GK428 4.2 L V8	Am	18	(United Kingdom) Kyle Tilley	All
(Russia) G-Drive Racing	Aurus 01	Gibson GK428 4.2 L V8	P2	25	(Portugal) Rui Andrade	All
(Russia) G-Drive Racing	Aurus 01	Gibson GK428 4.2 L V8	P2	25	(Argentina) Franco Colapinto	All
(Russia) G-Drive Racing	Aurus 01	Gibson GK428 4.2 L V8	P2	25	(United States) John Falb	All
(Russia) G-Drive Racing	Aurus 01	Gibson GK428 4.2 L V8	P2	26	(Austria) René Binder	All
(Russia) G-Drive Racing	Aurus 01	Gibson GK428 4.2 L V8	P2	26	(Austria) Ferdinand Habsburg	All
(Russia) G-Drive Racing	Aurus 01	Gibson GK428 4.2 L V8	P2	26	(China) Yifei Ye	All
(United Kingdom) Jota	Oreca 07	Gibson GK428 4.2 L V8	P2	28	(Indonesia) Sean Gelael	All
(United Kingdom) Jota	Oreca 07	Gibson GK428 4.2 L V8	P2	28	(Belgium) Stoffel Vandoorne	1–2
(United Kingdom) Jota	Oreca 07	Gibson GK428 4.2 L V8	P2	28	(United Kingdom) Tom Blomqvist	3–4
Racing Team India	Oreca 07	Gibson GK428 4.2 L V8	P2	64	(India) Narain Karthikeyan	All
Racing Team India	Oreca 07	Gibson GK428 4.2 L V8	P2	64	(India) Arjun Maini	All
Racing Team India	Oreca 07	Gibson GK428 4.2 L V8	P2	64	(United States) Naveen Rao	All

Icon	Class
P2	LMP2
Am	LMP2 Am

=== LMP3 ===
Entrant/Team	Car	Engine	No.	Drivers	Rounds
(United Kingdom) United Autosports	Ligier JS P320	Nissan VK56DE 5.6 L V8	2	(United Kingdom) Robert Wheldon	All
(United Kingdom) United Autosports	Ligier JS P320	Nissan VK56DE 5.6 L V8	2	(United Kingdom) Ian Loggie	All
(United Kingdom) United Autosports	Ligier JS P320	Nissan VK56DE 5.6 L V8	2	(United Kingdom) Andy Meyrick	All
(United Kingdom) United Autosports	Ligier JS P320	Nissan VK56DE 5.6 L V8	3	(United Kingdom) Andrew Bentley	All
(United Kingdom) United Autosports	Ligier JS P320	Nissan VK56DE 5.6 L V8	3	(United States) Jim McGuire	All
(United Kingdom) United Autosports	Ligier JS P320	Nissan VK56DE 5.6 L V8	3	(United Kingdom) Duncan Tappy	All
(United Kingdom) United Autosports	Ligier JS P320	Nissan VK56DE 5.6 L V8	23	(United Kingdom) Wayne Boyd	All
(United Kingdom) United Autosports	Ligier JS P320	Nissan VK56DE 5.6 L V8	23	(Venezuela) Manuel Maldonado	All
(United Kingdom) United Autosports	Ligier JS P320	Nissan VK56DE 5.6 L V8	23	(Finland) Rory Penttinen	All
(Germany) Phoenix-IronForce Racing	Ligier JS P320	Nissan VK56DE 5.6 L V8	4	(Germany) Jan-Erik Slooten	All
(Germany) Phoenix-IronForce Racing	Ligier JS P320	Nissan VK56DE 5.6 L V8	4	(Germany) Leo Weiss	All
(United Kingdom) Nielsen Racing	Ligier JS P320	Nissan VK56DE 5.6 L V8	8	(United Kingdom) Matthew Bell	All
(United Kingdom) Nielsen Racing	Ligier JS P320	Nissan VK56DE 5.6 L V8	8	(United States) Rodrigo Sales	All
(United Kingdom) Nielsen Racing	Ligier JS P320	Nissan VK56DE 5.6 L V8	9	(United Kingdom) Colin Noble	All
(United Kingdom) Nielsen Racing	Ligier JS P320	Nissan VK56DE 5.6 L V8	9	(United Kingdom) Anthony Wells	All
(United Kingdom) RLR MSport	Ligier JS P320	Nissan VK56DE 5.6 L V8	15	(United States) Maxwell Hanratty	All
(United Kingdom) RLR MSport	Ligier JS P320	Nissan VK56DE 5.6 L V8	15	(Denmark) Malthe Jakobsen	All
(United Kingdom) RLR MSport	Ligier JS P320	Nissan VK56DE 5.6 L V8	15	(United Arab Emirates) Bashar Mardini	All
(Spain) CD Sport	Ligier JS P320	Nissan VK56DE 5.6 L V8	33	(United Kingdom) Nick Adcock	All
(Spain) CD Sport	Ligier JS P320	Nissan VK56DE 5.6 L V8	33	(France) Adam Eteki	All
(Spain) CD Sport	Ligier JS P320	Nissan VK56DE 5.6 L V8	33	(Denmark) Michael Jensen	All
(Slovakia) ARC Bratislava	Ginetta G61-LT-P3	Nissan VK56DE 5.6 L V8	44	(Belgium) Tom Cloet	All
(Slovakia) ARC Bratislava	Ginetta G61-LT-P3	Nissan VK56DE 5.6 L V8	44	(Slovakia) Miroslav Konôpka	All
(Slovakia) ARC Bratislava	Ginetta G61-LT-P3	Nissan VK56DE 5.6 L V8	44	(United Kingdom) Charlie Robertson	All
(Luxembourg) DKR Engineering	Duqueine M30 – D08	Nissan VK56DE 5.6 L V8	63	(Belgium) Jean Glorieux	All
(Luxembourg) DKR Engineering	Duqueine M30 – D08	Nissan VK56DE 5.6 L V8	63	(Germany) Laurents Hörr	All

=== GT ===
Entrant/Team	Car	Engine	Class	No.	Drivers	Rounds
(Chinese Taipei) HubAuto Racing	Mercedes-AMG GT3 Evo	Mercedes-AMG M159 6.2 L V8	GT	1	(Brazil) Marcos Gomes	All
(Chinese Taipei) HubAuto Racing	Mercedes-AMG GT3 Evo	Mercedes-AMG M159 6.2 L V8	GT	1	(Italy) Raffaele Marciello	All
(Chinese Taipei) HubAuto Racing	Mercedes-AMG GT3 Evo	Mercedes-AMG M159 6.2 L V8	GT	1	(Australia) Liam Talbot	All
(United Kingdom) Inception Racing with Optimum Motorsport	McLaren 720S GT3	McLaren M840T 4.0 L Turbo V8	GT	7	(United Kingdom) Ben Barnicoat	All
(United Kingdom) Inception Racing with Optimum Motorsport	McLaren 720S GT3	McLaren M840T 4.0 L Turbo V8	GT	7	(United States) Brendan Iribe	All
(United Kingdom) Inception Racing with Optimum Motorsport	McLaren 720S GT3	McLaren M840T 4.0 L Turbo V8	GT	7	(United Kingdom) Ollie Millroy	All
(Switzerland) Kessel Racing	Ferrari 488 GT3	Ferrari F154CB 3.9 L Turbo V8	Am	27	(Germany) Tim Kohmann	All
(Switzerland) Kessel Racing	Ferrari 488 GT3	Ferrari F154CB 3.9 L Turbo V8	Am	27	(Italy) Giorgio Roda	All
(Switzerland) Kessel Racing	Ferrari 488 GT3	Ferrari F154CB 3.9 L Turbo V8	Am	27	(Italy) Francesco Zollo	All
(Japan) Car Guy Racing	Ferrari 488 GT3	Ferrari F154CB 3.9 L Turbo V8	GT	57	(Denmark) Mikkel Jensen	All
(Japan) Car Guy Racing	Ferrari 488 GT3	Ferrari F154CB 3.9 L Turbo V8	GT	57	(Japan) Takeshi Kimura	All
(Japan) Car Guy Racing	Ferrari 488 GT3	Ferrari F154CB 3.9 L Turbo V8	GT	57	(France) Côme Ledogar	All
(Germany) Walkenhorst Motorsport	BMW M6 GT3	BMW 4.4 L Turbo V8	GT	34	(Netherlands) Nicky Catsburg	All
(Germany) Walkenhorst Motorsport	BMW M6 GT3	BMW 4.4 L Turbo V8	GT	34	(United States) Chandler Hull	All
(Germany) Walkenhorst Motorsport	BMW M6 GT3	BMW 4.4 L Turbo V8	GT	34	(United States) Jon Miller	All
(Germany) Walkenhorst Motorsport	BMW M6 GT3	BMW 4.4 L Turbo V8	Am	35	(Germany) Jörg Breuer	All
(Germany) Walkenhorst Motorsport	BMW M6 GT3	BMW 4.4 L Turbo V8	Am	35	(Finland) Sami-Matti Trogen	All
(Germany) Walkenhorst Motorsport	BMW M6 GT3	BMW 4.4 L Turbo V8	Am	35	(Germany) Henry Walkenhorst	All
(United Arab Emirates) GPX Racing	Porsche 911 GT3 R	Porsche 4.0 L Flat-6	GT	40	(France) Julien Andlauer	All
(United Arab Emirates) GPX Racing	Porsche 911 GT3 R	Porsche 4.0 L Flat-6	GT	40	(France) Alain Ferté	All
(United Arab Emirates) GPX Racing	Porsche 911 GT3 R	Porsche 4.0 L Flat-6	GT	40	(Zimbabwe) Axcil Jefferies	All
(Italy) AF Corse	Ferrari 488 GT3	Ferrari F154CB 3.9 L Turbo V8	GT	51	(Italy) Alessandro Pier Guidi	All
(Italy) AF Corse	Ferrari 488 GT3	Ferrari F154CB 3.9 L Turbo V8	GT	51	(Brazil) Oswaldo Negri Jr.	All
(Italy) AF Corse	Ferrari 488 GT3	Ferrari F154CB 3.9 L Turbo V8	GT	51	(Puerto Rico) Francesco Piovanetti	All
(Italy) AF Corse	Ferrari 488 GT3	Ferrari F154CB 3.9 L Turbo V8	GT	54	(Italy) Francesco Castellacci	All
(Italy) AF Corse	Ferrari 488 GT3	Ferrari F154CB 3.9 L Turbo V8	GT	54	(Italy) Giancarlo Fisichella	All
(Italy) AF Corse	Ferrari 488 GT3	Ferrari F154CB 3.9 L Turbo V8	GT	54	(Switzerland) Thomas Flohr	All
(Germany) Rinaldi Racing	Ferrari 488 GT3	Ferrari F154CB 3.9 L Turbo V8	GT	55	(Italy) Rino Mastronardi	All
(Germany) Rinaldi Racing	Ferrari 488 GT3	Ferrari F154CB 3.9 L Turbo V8	GT	55	(South Africa) David Perel	All
(Germany) Rinaldi Racing	Ferrari 488 GT3	Ferrari F154CB 3.9 L Turbo V8	GT	55	(Italy) Davide Rigon	All
(Germany) Rinaldi Racing	Ferrari 488 GT3	Ferrari F154CB 3.9 L Turbo V8	Am	66	(Germany) Christian Hook	All
(Germany) Rinaldi Racing	Ferrari 488 GT3	Ferrari F154CB 3.9 L Turbo V8	Am	66	(Finland) Patrick Kujala	All
(Germany) Rinaldi Racing	Ferrari 488 GT3	Ferrari F154CB 3.9 L Turbo V8	Am	66	(Germany) Manuel Lauck	All
(Denmark) Formula Racing	Ferrari 488 GT3	Ferrari F154CB 3.9 L Turbo V8	GT	60	(Denmark) Johnny Laursen	All
(Denmark) Formula Racing	Ferrari 488 GT3	Ferrari F154CB 3.9 L Turbo V8	GT	60	(Denmark) Nicklas Nielsen	All
(Denmark) Formula Racing	Ferrari 488 GT3	Ferrari F154CB 3.9 L Turbo V8	GT	60	(Italy) Alessio Rovera	All
(Japan) D'station Racing	Aston Martin Vantage AMR GT3	Aston Martin 4.0 L Turbo V8	GT	77	(Japan) Tomonobu Fujii	All
(Japan) D'station Racing	Aston Martin Vantage AMR GT3	Aston Martin 4.0 L Turbo V8	GT	77	(United Kingdom) Tom Gamble	All
(Japan) D'station Racing	Aston Martin Vantage AMR GT3	Aston Martin 4.0 L Turbo V8	GT	77	(Japan) Satoshi Hoshino	All
(United Kingdom) Garage 59	Aston Martin Vantage AMR GT3	Aston Martin 4.0 L Turbo V8	GT	88	(France) Valentin Hasse-Clot	All
(United Kingdom) Garage 59	Aston Martin Vantage AMR GT3	Aston Martin 4.0 L Turbo V8	GT	88	(Belgium) Maxime Martin	All
(United Kingdom) Garage 59	Aston Martin Vantage AMR GT3	Aston Martin 4.0 L Turbo V8	GT	88	(Sweden) Alexander West	All
(United Kingdom) Garage 59	Aston Martin Vantage AMR GT3	Aston Martin 4.0 L Turbo V8	GT	89	(United Kingdom) Mike Benham	All
(United Kingdom) Garage 59	Aston Martin Vantage AMR GT3	Aston Martin 4.0 L Turbo V8	GT	89	(Germany) Marvin Kirchhöfer	All
(United Kingdom) Garage 59	Aston Martin Vantage AMR GT3	Aston Martin 4.0 L Turbo V8	GT	89	(Japan) Yuki Nemoto	All
(Germany) Precote Herberth Motorsport	Porsche 911 GT3 R	Porsche 4.0 L Flat-6	GT	93	(Hong Kong) Antares Au	All
(Germany) Precote Herberth Motorsport	Porsche 911 GT3 R	Porsche 4.0 L Flat-6	GT	93	(Austria) Klaus Bachler	All
(Germany) Precote Herberth Motorsport	Porsche 911 GT3 R	Porsche 4.0 L Flat-6	GT	93	(Germany) Steffen Görig	All
(Germany) Precote Herberth Motorsport	Porsche 911 GT3 R	Porsche 4.0 L Flat-6	GT	99	(Germany) Ralf Bohn	All
(Germany) Precote Herberth Motorsport	Porsche 911 GT3 R	Porsche 4.0 L Flat-6	GT	99	(Germany) Alfred Renauer	All
(Germany) Precote Herberth Motorsport	Porsche 911 GT3 R	Porsche 4.0 L Flat-6	GT	99	(Germany) Robert Renauer	All
(United Kingdom) TF Sport	Aston Martin Vantage AMR GT3	Aston Martin 4.0 L Turbo V8	GT	95	(Republic of Ireland) Charlie Eastwood	All
(United Kingdom) TF Sport	Aston Martin Vantage AMR GT3	Aston Martin 4.0 L Turbo V8	GT	95	(United Kingdom) Ollie Hancock	All
(United Kingdom) TF Sport	Aston Martin Vantage AMR GT3	Aston Martin 4.0 L Turbo V8	GT	95	(United Kingdom) John Hartshorne	All
Oman Racing Team with TF Sport	Aston Martin Vantage AMR GT3	Aston Martin 4.0 L Turbo V8	GT	97	(United Kingdom) Jonathan Adam	All
Oman Racing Team with TF Sport	Aston Martin Vantage AMR GT3	Aston Martin 4.0 L Turbo V8	GT	97	(Oman) Ahmad Al Harthy	All
Oman Racing Team with TF Sport	Aston Martin Vantage AMR GT3	Aston Martin 4.0 L Turbo V8	GT	97	(United Kingdom) Tom Canning	All

Icon	Class
GT	GT3
Am	GT3 Am

== Results ==
Bold indicates overall winner.

Round	Circuit	LMP2 Winning Team	LMP2 Am Winning Team	LMP3 Winning Team	GT Winning Team	GT Am Winning Team	Ref.
Round	Circuit	LMP2 Winning Drivers	LMP2 Am Winning Drivers	LMP3 Winning Drivers	GT Winning Drivers	GT Am Winning Drivers	Ref.
1	(United Arab Emirates) Dubai	**(Russia) No. 26 G-Drive Racing**	(United States) No. 18 Era Motorsport	(United Kingdom) No. 23 United Autosports	(Germany) No. 99 Precote Herberth Motorsport	(Germany) No. 66 Rinaldi Racing	Report
1	(United Arab Emirates) Dubai	**(Austria) René Binder** **(Austria) Ferdinand von Habsburg** **(China) Yifei Ye**	(Greece) Andreas Laskaratos (United States) Dwight Merriman (United Kingdom) Kyle Tilley	(United Kingdom) Wayne Boyd (Venezuela) Manuel Maldonado (Finland) Rory Penttinen	(Germany) Ralf Bohn (Germany) Alfred Renauer (Germany) Robert Renauer	(Germany) Christan Hook (Finland) Patrick Kujala (Germany) Manuel Lauck	Report
2	(United Arab Emirates) Dubai	**(Russia) No. 26 G-Drive Racing**	(United States) No. 18 Era Motorsport	(United Kingdom) No. 23 United Autosports	(United Arab Emirates) No. 40 GPX Racing	(Germany) No. 66 Rinaldi Racing	Report
2	(United Arab Emirates) Dubai	**(Austria) René Binder** **(Austria) Ferdinand von Habsburg** **(China) Yifei Ye**	(Greece) Andreas Laskaratos (United States) Dwight Merriman (United Kingdom) Kyle Tilley	(United Kingdom) Wayne Boyd (Venezuela) Manuel Maldonado (Finland) Rory Penttinen	(France) Julien Andlauer (France) Alain Ferté (Zimbabwe) Axcil Jefferies	(Germany) Christan Hook (Finland) Patrick Kujala (Germany) Manuel Lauck	Report
3	(United Arab Emirates) Abu Dhabi	**(United Kingdom) No. 28 Jota**	(United States) No. 18 Era Motorsport	(United Kingdom) No. 9 Nielsen Racing	(United Arab Emirates) No. 40 GPX Racing	(Germany) No. 66 Rinaldi Racing	Report
3	(United Arab Emirates) Abu Dhabi	**(United Kingdom) Tom Blomqvist** **(Indonesia) Sean Gelael**	(Greece) Andreas Laskaratos (United States) Dwight Merriman (United Kingdom) Kyle Tilley	(United Kingdom) Colin Noble (United Kingdom) Anthony Wells	(France) Julien Andlauer (France) Alain Ferté (Zimbabwe) Axcil Jefferies	(Germany) Christan Hook (Finland) Patrick Kujala (Germany) Manuel Lauck	Report
4	(United Arab Emirates) Abu Dhabi	**(United Kingdom) No. 28 Jota**	(United States) No. 18 Era Motorsport	(United Kingdom) No. 23 United Autosports	(Japan) No. 57 Car Guy Racing	(Germany) No. 35 Walkenhorst Motorsport	Report
4	(United Arab Emirates) Abu Dhabi	**(United Kingdom) Tom Blomqvist** **(Indonesia) Sean Gelael**	(Greece) Andreas Laskaratos (United States) Dwight Merriman (United Kingdom) Kyle Tilley	(United Kingdom) Wayne Boyd (Venezuela) Manuel Maldonado (Finland) Rory Penttinen	(Denmark) Mikkel Jensen (Japan) Takeshi Kimura (France) Côme Ledogar	(Germany) Jörg Breuer (Finland) Sami-Matti Trogen (Germany) Henry Walkenhorst	Report

== Teams' Championships ==
Points are awarded according to the following structure:

Position	**1st**	**2nd**	**3rd**	**4th**	**5th**	**6th**	**7th**	**8th**	**9th**	**10th**	**Other**	**Pole**
Points	25	18	15	12	10	8	6	4	2	1	0.5	1

=== LMP2 Teams Championship ===
Pos.	Team	Car	DUB (United Arab Emirates)		ABU (United Arab Emirates)		Points
1	(Russia) #26 G-Drive Racing	Aurus 01	1	1	2	**4**	81
2	(United Kingdom) #28 Jota	Oreca 07	2	5	1	1	78
3	(Russia) #25 G-Drive Racing	Aurus 01	**4**	**2**	**3**	2	66
4	(Germany) #5 Phoenix Racing	Oreca 07	3	3	4	3	57
5	#64 Racing Team India	Oreca 07	5	4	5	5	42

Key
Colour	Result
Gold	Race winner
Silver	2nd place
Bronze	3rd place
Green	Points finish
Blue	Non-points finish
Blue	Non-classified finish (NC)
Purple	Did not finish (Ret)
Black	Disqualified (DSQ)
Black	Excluded (EX)
White	Did not start (DNS)
White	Race cancelled (C)
White	Withdrew (WD)
Blank	Did not participate

**Bold** – Pole

=== LMP2 Am Teams Championship ===
Pos.	Team	Car	DUB (United Arab Emirates)		ABU (United Arab Emirates)		Points
1	(United States) #18 Era Motorsport	Oreca 07	**1**	**1**	**1**	**1**	104
2	(Italy) #11 EuroInternational – Ojets	Ligier JS P217	2	Ret	DNS	DNS	18

Key
Colour	Result
Gold	Race winner
Silver	2nd place
Bronze	3rd place
Green	Points finish
Blue	Non-points finish
Blue	Non-classified finish (NC)
Purple	Did not finish (Ret)
Black	Disqualified (DSQ)
Black	Excluded (EX)
White	Did not start (DNS)
White	Race cancelled (C)
White	Withdrew (WD)
Blank	Did not participate

**Bold** – Pole

=== LMP3 Teams Championship ===
Pos.	Team	Car	DUB (United Arab Emirates)		ABU (United Arab Emirates)		Points
1	(United Kingdom) #23 United Autosports	Ligier JS P320	**1**	**1**	**Ret**	1	77
2	(United Kingdom) #3 United Autosports	Ligier JS P320	3	5	3	2	58
3	(United Kingdom) #9 Nielsen Racing	Ligier JS P320	2	Ret	1	6	51
4	(United Kingdom) #2 United Autosports	Ligier JS P320	4	2	Ret	3	45
5	(United Kingdom) #8 Nielsen Racing	Ligier JS P320	Ret	3	2	7	39
6	(Luxembourg) #63 DKR Engineering	Duqueine M30 - D08	Ret	4	5	5	32
7	(United Kingdom) #15 RLR MSport	Ligier JS P320	6	7	4	**Ret**	27
8	(Spain) #33 CD Sport	Ligier JS P320	7	6	Ret	4	26
9	(Slovakia) #44 ARC Bratislava	Ginetta G61-LT-P3	Ret	8	6	9	14
-	(Germany) #4 Phoenix-IronForce Racing	Ligier JS P320	5	Ret	Ret	8	14

Key
Colour	Result
Gold	Race winner
Silver	2nd place
Bronze	3rd place
Green	Points finish
Blue	Non-points finish
Blue	Non-classified finish (NC)
Purple	Did not finish (Ret)
Black	Disqualified (DSQ)
Black	Excluded (EX)
White	Did not start (DNS)
White	Race cancelled (C)
White	Withdrew (WD)
Blank	Did not participate

**Bold** – Pole

=== GT Teams Championship ===
Pos.	Team	Car	DUB (United Arab Emirates)		ABU (United Arab Emirates)		Points
1	(Germany) #99 Precote Herberth Motorsport	Porsche 911 GT3 R	**1**	5	2	5	64
2	(United Arab Emirates) #40 GPX Racing	Porsche 911 GT3 R	4	1	1	14	62.5
3	(Germany) #55 Rinaldi Racing	Ferrari 488 GT3	8	2	4	3	49
4	(United Kingdom) #7 Inception Racing with Optimum Motorsport	McLaren 720S GT3	2	6	10	2	45
5	(United Kingdom) #88 Garage 59	Aston Martin Vantage AMR GT3	5	3	6	9	35
6	(Japan) #57 Car Guy Racing	Ferrari 488 GT3	9	8	13	1	31.5
7	(Chinese Taipei) #1 HubAuto Racing	Mercedes-AMG GT3 Evo	Ret	4	**5**	**8**	28
8	#97 Oman Racing Team with TF Sport	Aston Martin Vantage AMR GT3	7	7	Ret	4	24
9	(Denmark) #60 Formula Racing	Ferrari 488 GT3	6	16	3	Ret	23.5
10	(Germany) #34 Walkenhorst Motorsport	BMW M6 GT3	3	Ret	14	11	16
11	(Japan) #77 D'station Racing	Aston Martin Vantage AMR GT3	13	13	7	7	13
12	(United Kingdom) #95 TF Sport	Aston Martin Vantage AMR GT3	10	11	16	6	10
13	(Italy) #51 AF Corse	Ferrari 488 GT3	14	14	8	Ret	5
14	(Germany) #93 Precote Herberth Motorsport	Porsche 911 GT3 R	15	**9**	12	13	4.5
15	(United Kingdom) #89 Garage 59	Aston Martin Vantage AMR GT3	17	10	9	10	4.5
16	(Germany) #35 Walkenhorst Motorsport	BMW M6 GT3	16	18	18	12	2
17	(Switzerland) #27 Kessel Racing	Ferrari 488 GT3	18	17	17	15	2
18	(Italy) #54 AF Corse	Ferrari 488 GT3	11	12	11	Ret	1.5
19	(Germany) #66 Rinaldi Racing	Ferrari 488 GT3	12	15	15	Ret	1.5

Key
Colour	Result
Gold	Race winner
Silver	2nd place
Bronze	3rd place
Green	Points finish
Blue	Non-points finish
Blue	Non-classified finish (NC)
Purple	Did not finish (Ret)
Black	Disqualified (DSQ)
Black	Excluded (EX)
White	Did not start (DNS)
White	Race cancelled (C)
White	Withdrew (WD)
Blank	Did not participate

**Bold** – Pole

=== GT Am Teams Championship ===
Pos.	Team	Car	DUB (United Arab Emirates)		ABU (United Arab Emirates)		Points
1	(Germany) #66 Rinaldi Racing	Ferrari 488 GT3	1	1	**1**	**Ret**	77
2	(Germany) #35 Walkenhorst Motorsport	BMW M6 GT3	2	3	3	1	73
3	(Switzerland) #27 Kessel Racing	Ferrari 488 GT3	**3**	**2**	2	2	71

Key
Colour	Result
Gold	Race winner
Silver	2nd place
Bronze	3rd place
Green	Points finish
Blue	Non-points finish
Blue	Non-classified finish (NC)
Purple	Did not finish (Ret)
Black	Disqualified (DSQ)
Black	Excluded (EX)
White	Did not start (DNS)
White	Race cancelled (C)
White	Withdrew (WD)
Blank	Did not participate

**Bold** – Pole

== Drivers' championships ==
Points are awarded according to the following structure:

Position	**1st**	**2nd**	**3rd**	**4th**	**5th**	**6th**	**7th**	**8th**	**9th**	**10th**	**Other**	**Pole**
Points	25	18	15	12	10	8	6	4	2	1	0.5	1

=== LMP2 Drivers Championship ===
Pos.	Drivers	DUB (United Arab Emirates)		ABU (United Arab Emirates)		Points
1	(Austria) René Binder	1	1	2	**4**	81
1	(Austria) Ferdinand von Habsburg	1	1	2	**4**	81
1	(China) Yifei Ye	1	1	2	**4**	81
2	(Indonesia) Sean Gelael	2	5	1	1	78
3	(Portugal) Rui Andrade	**4**	**2**	**3**	2	66
3	(Argentina) Franco Colapinto	**4**	**2**	**3**	2	66
3	(United States) John Falb	**4**	**2**	**3**	2	66
4	(Liechtenstein) Matthias Kaiser	3	3	4	3	57
4	(Switzerland) Simon Trummer	3	3	4	3	57
5	(United Kingdom) Tom Blomqvist			1	1	50
6	(India) Narain Karthikeyan	5	4	5	5	42
6	(India) Arjun Maini	5	4	5	5	42
6	(United States) Naveen Rao	5	4	5	5	42
7	(Denmark) Nicki Thiim	3	3			30
8	(Belgium) Stoffel Vandoorne	2	5			28
9	(South Africa) Kelvin van der Linde			4	3	27

Key
Colour	Result
Gold	Race winner
Silver	2nd place
Bronze	3rd place
Green	Points finish
Blue	Non-points finish
Blue	Non-classified finish (NC)
Purple	Did not finish (Ret)
Black	Disqualified (DSQ)
Black	Excluded (EX)
White	Did not start (DNS)
White	Race cancelled (C)
White	Withdrew (WD)
Blank	Did not participate

**Bold** – Pole

=== LMP2 Am Drivers Championship ===
Pos.	Drivers	DUB (United Arab Emirates)		ABU (United Arab Emirates)		Points
1	(Greece) Andreas Laskaratos	**1**	**1**	**1**	**1**	104
1	(United States) Dwight Merriman	**1**	**1**	**1**	**1**	104
1	(United Kingdom) Kyle Tilley	**1**	**1**	**1**	**1**	104
2	(Australia) John Corbett	2	Ret	DNS	DNS	18
2	(Australia) Neale Muston	2	Ret	DNS	DNS	18

Key
Colour	Result
Gold	Race winner
Silver	2nd place
Bronze	3rd place
Green	Points finish
Blue	Non-points finish
Blue	Non-classified finish (NC)
Purple	Did not finish (Ret)
Black	Disqualified (DSQ)
Black	Excluded (EX)
White	Did not start (DNS)
White	Race cancelled (C)
White	Withdrew (WD)
Blank	Did not participate

**Bold** – Pole

=== LMP3 Drivers Championship ===
Pos.	Drivers	DUB (United Arab Emirates)		ABU (United Arab Emirates)		Points
1	(United Kingdom) Wayne Boyd	**1**	**1**	**Ret**	1	78
1	(Venezuela) Manuel Maldonado	**1**	**1**	**Ret**	1	78
1	(Finland) Rory Penttinen	**1**	**1**	**Ret**	1	78
2	(United Kingdom) Andrew Bentley	3	5	3	2	58
2	(United States) Jim McGuire	3	5	3	2	58
2	(United Kingdom) Duncan Tappy	3	5	3	2	58
3	(United Kingdom) Colin Noble	2	Ret	1	6	51
3	(United Kingdom) Anthony Wells	2	Ret	1	6	51
4	(United Kingdom) Robert Wheldon	4	2	Ret	3	45
4	(United Kingdom) Ian Loggie	4	2	Ret	3	45
4	(United Kingdom) Andy Meyrick	4	2	Ret	3	45
5	(United Kingdom) Matthew Bell	Ret	3	2	7	39
5	(United States) Rodrigo Sales	Ret	3	2	7	39
6	(Belgium) Jean Glorieux	Ret	4	5	5	32
6	(Germany) Laurents Hörr	Ret	4	5	5	32
7	(United States) Maxwell Hanratty	6	7	4	**Ret**	27
7	(Denmark) Malthe Jakobsen	6	7	4	**Ret**	27
7	(United Arab Emirates) Bashar Mardini	6	7	4	**Ret**	27
8	(United Kingdom) Nick Adcock	7	6	Ret	4	26
8	(France) Adam Eteki	7	6	Ret	4	26
8	(Denmark) Michael Jensen	7	6	Ret	4	26
9	(Germany) Jan-Erik Slooten	5	Ret	Ret	8	14
9	(Germany) Leo Weiss	5	Ret	Ret	8	14
10	(Belgium) Tom Cloet	Ret	8	6	9	14
10	(Slovakia) Miroslav Konôpka	Ret	8	6	9	14
10	(United Kingdom) Charlie Robertson	Ret	8	6	9	14

Key
Colour	Result
Gold	Race winner
Silver	2nd place
Bronze	3rd place
Green	Points finish
Blue	Non-points finish
Blue	Non-classified finish (NC)
Purple	Did not finish (Ret)
Black	Disqualified (DSQ)
Black	Excluded (EX)
White	Did not start (DNS)
White	Race cancelled (C)
White	Withdrew (WD)
Blank	Did not participate

**Bold** – Pole

=== GT Drivers Championship ===
Pos.	Drivers	DUB (United Arab Emirates)		ABU (United Arab Emirates)		Points
1	(Germany) Ralf Bohn	**1**	5	2	5	64
1	(Germany) Alfred Renauer	**1**	5	2	5	64
1	(Germany) Robert Renauer	**1**	5	2	5	64
2	(France) Julien Andlauer	4	1	1	14	62.5
2	(France) Alain Ferté	4	1	1	14	62.5
2	(Zimbabwe) Axcil Jefferies	4	1	1	14	62.5
3	(Italy) Rino Mastronardi	8	2	4	3	49
3	(South Africa) David Perel	8	2	4	3	49
3	(Italy) Davide Rigon	8	2	4	3	49
4	(United Kingdom) Ben Barnicoat	2	6	10	2	45
4	(United States) Brendan Iribe	2	6	10	2	45
4	(United Kingdom) Ollie Millroy	2	6	10	2	45
5	(France) Valentin Hasse-Clot	5	3	6	9	35
5	(Belgium) Maxime Martin	5	3	6	9	35
5	(Sweden) Alexander West	5	3	6	9	35
6	(Denmark) Mikkel Jensen	9	8	13	1	31.5
6	(Japan) Takeshi Kimura	9	8	13	1	31.5
6	(France) Côme Ledogar	9	8	13	1	31.5
7	(Brazil) Marcos Gomes	Ret	4	**5**	**8**	28
7	(Italy) Raffaele Marciello	Ret	4	**5**	**8**	28
7	(Australia) Liam Talbot	Ret	4	**5**	**8**	28
8	(United Kingdom) Jonathan Adam	7	7	Ret	4	24
8	(Oman) Ahmad Al Harthy	7	7	Ret	4	24
8	(United Kingdom) Tom Canning	7	7	Ret	4	24
9	(Denmark) Johnny Laursen	6	16	3	Ret	23.5
9	(Denmark) Nicklas Nielsen	6	16	3	Ret	23.5
9	(Italy) Alessio Rovera	6	16	3	Ret	23.5
10	(Netherlands) Nicky Catsburg	3	Ret	14	11	16
10	(United States) Chandler Hull	3	Ret	14	11	16
10	(United States) Jon Miller	3	Ret	14	11	16
11	(Japan) Tomonobu Fujii	13	13	7	7	13
11	(United Kingdom) Tom Gamble	13	13	7	7	13
11	(Japan) Satoshi Hoshino	13	13	7	7	13
12	(Republic of Ireland) Charlie Eastwood	10	11	16	6	10
12	(United Kingdom) Ollie Hancock	10	11	16	6	10
12	(United Kingdom) John Hartshorne	10	11	16	6	10
13	(Italy) Alessandro Pier Guidi	14	14	8	Ret	5
13	(Brazil) Oswaldo Negri Jr.	14	14	8	Ret	5
13	(Puerto Rico) Francesco Piovanetti	14	14	8	Ret	5
14	(United Kingdom) Mike Benham	17	10	9	10	4.5
14	(Germany) Marvin Kirchhöfer	17	10	9	10	4.5
14	(Japan) Yuki Nemoto	17	10	9	10	4.5
15	(Hong Kong) Antares Au	15	**9**	12	13	4.5
15	(Austria) Klaus Bachler	15	**9**	12	13	4.5
15	(Germany) Steffen Görig	15	**9**	12	13	4.5
16	(Italy) Francesco Castellacci	11	12	11	Ret	1.5
16	(Italy) Giancarlo Fisichella	11	12	11	Ret	1.5
16	(Switzerland) Thomas Flohr	11	12	11	Ret	1.5

Key
Colour	Result
Gold	Race winner
Silver	2nd place
Bronze	3rd place
Green	Points finish
Blue	Non-points finish
Blue	Non-classified finish (NC)
Purple	Did not finish (Ret)
Black	Disqualified (DSQ)
Black	Excluded (EX)
White	Did not start (DNS)
White	Race cancelled (C)
White	Withdrew (WD)
Blank	Did not participate

**Bold** – Pole

=== GT Am Drivers Championship ===
Pos.	Drivers	DUB (United Arab Emirates)		ABU (United Arab Emirates)		Points
1	(Germany) Christian Hook (Finland) Patrick Kujala (Germany) Manuel Lauck	1	1	**1**	**Ret**	77
2	(Germany) Jörg Breuer (Finland) Sami-Matti Trogen (Germany) Henry Walkenhorst	2	3	3	1	73
3	(Germany) Tim Kohmann (Italy) Giorgio Roda (Italy) Francesco Zollo	**3**	**2**	2	2	71

Key
Colour	Result
Gold	Race winner
Silver	2nd place
Bronze	3rd place
Green	Points finish
Blue	Non-points finish
Blue	Non-classified finish (NC)
Purple	Did not finish (Ret)
Black	Disqualified (DSQ)
Black	Excluded (EX)
White	Did not start (DNS)
White	Race cancelled (C)
White	Withdrew (WD)
Blank	Did not participate

**Bold** – Pole
