= 2008 Euroseries 3000 =

Seasons
- ← 2007 2009 →

The 2008 Euroseries 3000 season was the tenth Euro Formula 3000 season. The main series was won by Frenchman Nicolas Prost.

== Teams and drivers ==
Team	No.	Driver	Rounds
(Italy) GP Racing	1	(Spain) Roldán Rodríguez	1, 3
(Italy) GP Racing	1	(Venezuela) Pastor Maldonado	2
(Italy) GP Racing	1	(Italy) Fabrizio Crestani	4-8
(Italy) GP Racing	2	(Italy) Fabio Onidi	All
(Italy) Bull Racing	4	(Brazil) Fábio Beretta	1-5, 7-8
(Italy) Bull Racing	4	(France) Nicolas Prost	6
(Italy) Bull Racing	5	(France) Nicolas Prost	1-5, 7-8
(Italy) Bull Racing	5	(Spain) Bruno Méndez	6
(Italy) Bull Racing	6	(Brazil) Luiz Razia	1-5, 7-8
(Italy) Bull Racing	6	(Brazil) Fábio Beretta	6
(Italy) Durango	7	(Colombia) Omar Leal	All
(Italy) Sighinolfi Autoracing	8	(Italy) Matteo Cozzari	5-6
(Italy) Sighinolfi Autoracing	9	(Brazil) Felipe Guimarães	6
(Italy) Sighinolfi Autoracing	9	(Spain) Bruno Méndez	8
(Italy) Sighinolfi Autoracing	10	(Mexico) Davíd Garza Pérez	6
(Italy) Sighinolfi Autoracing	10	(Italy) Edoardo Piscopo	7
(Italy) Sighinolfi Autoracing	10	(Venezuela) Rodolfo González	8
(Italy) Sighinolfi Autoracing	19	(Italy) Diego Romanini	8
(Italy) Emmebi Motorsport	11	(Italy) Francesco Dracone	1-7
(Italy) Emmebi Motorsport	12	(Spain) Juan Ramón Zapata	1-2, 4-8
(Italy) TP Formula	14	(Estonia) Marko Asmer	1
(Italy) TP Formula	14	(Italy) Davide Rigon	2
(Italy) TP Formula	14	(Pakistan) Adam Khan	3-8
(Italy) TP Formula	15	(Brazil) Felipe Guimarães	3-4
(Italy) TP Formula	15	(Monaco) Clivio Piccione	5
(Italy) Rollcentre	16	(Italy) Matteo Cozzari	7-8
(Italy) Rollcentre	18	(Italy) Raffaele Giammaria	8
(Spain) EmiliodeVillota.com Motorsport	19	(Italy) Matteo Cozzari	1
(Spain) EmiliodeVillota.com Motorsport	19	(Spain) María de Villota	2

== Race calendar ==
Rounds denoted with a blue background are a part of the Italian Formula 3000 Championship.

Round		Circuit	Date	Pole Position	Fastest Lap	Winning Driver	Winning Team
1	R1	(Italy) ACI Vallelunga Circuit	20 April	(France) Nicolas Prost	(Italy) Fabio Onidi	(Italy) Fabio Onidi	(Italy) GP Racing
1	R2	(Italy) ACI Vallelunga Circuit	20 April		(Italy) Fabio Onidi	(Spain) Roldán Rodríguez	(Italy) GP Racing
2	R1	(Belgium) Circuit de Spa-Francorchamps	1 June	(Italy) Davide Rigon	(Venezuela) Pastor Maldonado	(Venezuela) Pastor Maldonado	(Italy) GP Racing
2	R2	(Belgium) Circuit de Spa-Francorchamps	1 June	Race canceled			
3	R1	(Spain) Circuit de Valencia	29 June	(Brazil) Felipe Guimarães	(Brazil) Felipe Guimarães	(Spain) Roldán Rodríguez	(Italy) GP Racing
3	R2	(Spain) Circuit de Valencia	29 June		(Italy) Fabio Onidi	(Italy) Fabio Onidi	(Italy) GP Racing
4	R1	(Italy) Mugello Circuit	20 July	(Pakistan) Adam Khan	(Pakistan) Adam Khan	(Pakistan) Adam Khan	(Italy) TP Formula
4	R2	(Italy) Mugello Circuit	20 July		(Italy) Fabrizio Crestani	(Italy) Fabrizio Crestani	(Italy) GP Racing
5	R1	(Italy) Misano World Circuit	14 September	(Colombia) Omar Leal	(Brazil) Luiz Razia	(Brazil) Luiz Razia	(Italy) Bull Racing
5	R2	(Italy) Misano World Circuit	14 September		(Monaco) Clivio Piccione	(Pakistan) Adam Khan	(Italy) TP Formula
6	R1	(Spain) Circuito de Jerez	19 October	(France) Nicolas Prost	(Pakistan) Adam Khan	(France) Nicolas Prost	(Italy) Bull Racing
6	R2	(Spain) Circuito de Jerez	19 October		(Mexico) Davíd Garza Pérez	(Mexico) Davíd Garza Pérez	(Italy) Sighinolfi Autoracing
7	R1	(Spain) Circuit de Catalunya	2 November	(Pakistan) Adam Khan	(Italy) Fabio Onidi	(Pakistan) Adam Khan	(Italy) TP Formula
7	R2	(Spain) Circuit de Catalunya	2 November		(Italy) Fabrizio Crestani	(Brazil) Luiz Razia	(Italy) Bull Racing
8	R1	(Italy) Autodromo dell'Umbria	30 November	(Brazil) Luiz Razia	(Italy) Fabio Onidi	(Italy) Fabrizio Crestani	(Italy) GP Racing
8	R2	(Italy) Autodromo dell'Umbria	30 November		(Italy) Fabio Onidi	(Italy) Fabrizio Crestani	(Italy) GP Racing

== Championship Standings ==
- Points for both championships are awarded as follows:

Race
Position	1st	2nd	3rd	4th	5th	6th	7th	8th
**Race One**	10	8	6	5	4	3	2	1
**Race Two**	6	5	4	3	2	1		

In addition:

- One point will be awarded for Pole position for Race One
- One point will be awarded for fastest lap in each race

=== Drivers ===
Pos	Driver	VLL (Italy)		SPA (Belgium)		VAL (Spain)		MUG (Italy)		MIS (Italy)		JER (Spain)		CAT (Spain)		UMB (Italy)		Points
1	(France) Nicolas Prost	**3**	4	4	C	4	3	3	8	4	3	**1**	8	4	2	Ret	7	60
2	(Italy) Fabio Onidi	1	3	3	C	7	1	5	2	Ret	Ret	Ret	5	5	Ret	5	2	58
3	(Pakistan) Adam Khan					3	Ret	**1**	7	8	1	2	2	**1**	Ret	4	Ret	55
4	(Brazil) Luiz Razia	4	2	5	C	Ret	6	2	5	1	Ret			7	1	**3**	6	52
5	(Italy) Fabrizio Crestani							6	1	6	5	3	4	2	7	1	1	49
6	(Colombia) Omar Leal	5	6	9	C	5	2	4	3	**3**	2	Ret	7	Ret	4	Ret	9	38
7	(Brazil) Fábio Beretta	6	5	8	C	6	7	8	4	5	6	5	3	6	Ret	6	8	32
8	(Spain) Roldán Rodríguez	2	1			1	5											26
9	(Brazil) Felipe Guimarães					**2**	4	7	6			9	Ret					16
10	(Italy) Raffaele Giammaria															2	3	12
11	(Monaco) Clivio Piccione									2	4							12
12	(Venezuela) Pastor Maldonado			1	C													11
13	(Mexico) Davíd Garza Pérez											6	1					10
14	(Italy) Edoardo Piscopo													3	3			10
15	(Italy) Davide Rigon			**2**	C													9
16	(Spain) Bruno Méndez											4	6			Ret	5	8
17	(Spain) Juan Ramón Zapata	9	Ret	6	C			9	10	7	7	8	9	Ret	6	8	11	8
18	(Italy) Francesco Dracone	8	7	10	C	8	8	Ret	9	Ret	Ret	7	Ret	8	5			7
19	(Venezuela) Rodolfo González															Ret	4	3
20	(Italy) Matteo Cozzari	7	Ret							Ret	8	Ret	Ret	Ret	8	9	10	2
21	(Italy) Diego Romanini															7	12	2
22	(Spain) María de Villota			7	C													2
	(Estonia) Marko Asmer	DNS	DNS															0
Pos	Driver	VLL (Italy)		SPA (Belgium)		VAL (Spain)		MUG (Italy)		MIS (Italy)		JER (Spain)		CAT (Spain)		UMB (Italy)		Points

Colour	Result
Gold	Winner
Silver	Second place
Bronze	Third place
Green	Points classification
Blue	Non-points classification
Blue	Non-classified finish (NC)
Purple	Retired, not classified (Ret)
Red	Did not qualify (DNQ)
Red	Did not pre-qualify (DNPQ)
Black	Disqualified (DSQ)
White	Did not start (DNS)
White	Withdrew (WD)
White	Race cancelled (C)
Blank	Did not practice (DNP)
Blank	Did not arrive (DNA)
Blank	Excluded (EX)

**Bold** - Pole
Italics - Fastest Lap

==== F3000 Italian Championship ====
Pos	Driver	VLL (Italy)		VAL (Spain)		MUG (Italy)		MIS (Italy)		Points
1	(Colombia) Omar Leal	5	6	5	2	4	3	**3**	2	35
2	(Italy) Fabio Onidi	1	3	7	1	5	2	Ret	Ret	34
3	(France) Nicolas Prost	**3**	4	4	3	3	8	4	3	34
4	(Brazil) Luiz Razia	4	2	Ret	6	2	5	1	Ret	32
5	(Spain) Roldán Rodríguez	2	1	1	5					26
6	(Pakistan) Adam Khan			3	Ret	**1**	7	8	1	25
7	(Brazil) Fábio Beretta	6	5	6	7	8	4	5	6	17
8	(Brazil) Felipe Guimarães			**2**	4	7	6			16
9	(Italy) Fabrizio Crestani					6	1	6	5	15
10	(Monaco) Clivio Piccione							2	4	12
11	(Spain) Juan Ramón Zapata	9	Ret			9	10	7	7	2
12	(Italy) Matteo Cozzari	7	Ret					Ret	8	2
13	(Italy) Francesco Dracone	8	7	8	8	Ret	9	Ret	Ret	2
	(Estonia) Marko Asmer	DNS	DNS							0
Pos	Driver	VLL (Italy)		VAL (Spain)		MUG (Italy)		MIS (Italy)		Points

Colour	Result
Gold	Winner
Silver	Second place
Bronze	Third place
Green	Points classification
Blue	Non-points classification
Blue	Non-classified finish (NC)
Purple	Retired, not classified (Ret)
Red	Did not qualify (DNQ)
Red	Did not pre-qualify (DNPQ)
Black	Disqualified (DSQ)
White	Did not start (DNS)
White	Withdrew (WD)
White	Race cancelled (C)
Blank	Did not practice (DNP)
Blank	Did not arrive (DNA)
Blank	Excluded (EX)

**Bold** - Pole
Italics - Fastest Lap

=== Teams ===
Pos	Team	VLL (Italy)		SPA (Belgium)		VAL (Spain)		MUG (Italy)		MIS (Italy)		JER (Spain)		CAT (Spain)		UMB (Italy)		Points
1	(Italy) Bull Racing	**3**	4	4	C	4	3	3	8	4	3	4	6	4	2	Ret	7	150
1	(Italy) Bull Racing	4	2	5	C	Ret	6	2	5	1	Ret	5	3	7	1	**3**	6	150
2	(Italy) GP Racing	2	1	1	C	1	5	6	1	6	5	3	4	2	7	1	1	144
2	(Italy) GP Racing	1	3	3	C	7	1	5	2	Ret	Ret	Ret	5	5	Ret	5	2	144
3	(Italy) TP Formula	DNS	DNS	**2**	C	3	Ret	**1**	7	8	**1**	2	2	**1**	Ret	4	Ret	80
3	(Italy) TP Formula				C	**2**	4	7	6									80
4	(Italy) Sighinolfi Autoracing				C							9	Ret			Ret	5	39
4	(Italy) Sighinolfi Autoracing				C							6	1	3	3	Ret	4	39
5	(Italy) Durango	5	6	9	C	5	2	4	3	**3**	2	Ret	7	Ret	4	Ret	9	38
6	(Italy) Emmebi Motorsport	8	7	10	C	8	8	Ret	9	Ret	Ret	7	Ret	8	5			15
6	(Italy) Emmebi Motorsport	9	Ret	6	C			9	10	7	7	8	9	Ret	6	8	11	15
7	(Italy) Rollcentre				C											9	10	12
7	(Italy) Rollcentre				C											2	3	12
8	(Spain) EmiliodeVillota.com Motorsport	7	Ret	7	C													4
Pos	Team	VLL (Italy)		SPA (Belgium)		VAL (Spain)		MUG (Italy)		MIS (Italy)		JER (Spain)		CAT (Spain)		UMB (Italy)		Points

Colour	Result
Gold	Winner
Silver	Second place
Bronze	Third place
Green	Points classification
Blue	Non-points classification
Blue	Non-classified finish (NC)
Purple	Retired, not classified (Ret)
Red	Did not qualify (DNQ)
Red	Did not pre-qualify (DNPQ)
Black	Disqualified (DSQ)
White	Did not start (DNS)
White	Withdrew (WD)
White	Race cancelled (C)
Blank	Did not practice (DNP)
Blank	Did not arrive (DNA)
Blank	Excluded (EX)

**Bold** - Pole
Italics - Fastest Lap

==== F3000 Italian Championship ====
Pos	Team	VLL (Italy)		VAL (Spain)		MUG (Italy)		MIS (Italy)		Points
1	(Italy) Bull Racing	**3**	4	4	3	3	8	4	3	83
1	(Italy) Bull Racing	4	2	Ret	6	2	5	1	Ret	83
2	(Italy) GP Racing	2	1	1	5	6	1	6	5	75
2	(Italy) GP Racing	1	3	7	1	5	2	Ret	Ret	75
3	(Italy) TP Formula	DNS	DNS	3	Ret	**1**	7	8	1	41
3	(Italy) TP Formula			**2**	4	7	6			41
4	(Italy) Durango	5	6	5	2	4	3	**3**	2	35
5	(Italy) Emmebi Motorsport	8	7	8	8	Ret	9	Ret	Ret	15
5	(Italy) Emmebi Motorsport	9	Ret			9	10	7	7	15
6	(Italy) Sighinolfi Autoracing							2	4	12
6	(Italy) Sighinolfi Autoracing							Ret	8	12
7	(Spain) EmiliodeVillota.com Motorsport	7	Ret							2
Pos	Team	VLL (Italy)		VAL (Spain)		MUG (Italy)		MIS (Italy)		Points

Colour	Result
Gold	Winner
Silver	Second place
Bronze	Third place
Green	Points classification
Blue	Non-points classification
Blue	Non-classified finish (NC)
Purple	Retired, not classified (Ret)
Red	Did not qualify (DNQ)
Red	Did not pre-qualify (DNPQ)
Black	Disqualified (DSQ)
White	Did not start (DNS)
White	Withdrew (WD)
White	Race cancelled (C)
Blank	Did not practice (DNP)
Blank	Did not arrive (DNA)
Blank	Excluded (EX)

**Bold** - Pole
Italics - Fastest Lap
