= List of GP2 Asia Series drivers =

This is a list of GP2 Asia Series drivers, that is, a list of drivers who have made at least one race entry in the GP2 Asia Series from 2008 onwards. The list is accurate up to and including the end of the 2011 season.

== By name ==
Name	Country	Seasons	Championship Titles	Race entries (Starts)	Poles (Note: Reverse-grid pole positions not included.)	Wins	Podiums	Fastest Laps	Points
Mikhail Aleshin	Russia	2011	0	4	0	0	0	0	0
Hamad Al Fardan	Bahrain	2008–09	0	12 (11)	0	0	0	0	2
Vladimir Arabadzhiev	Bulgaria	2009–10	0	8	0	0	0	0	0
Christian Bakkerud	Denmark	2008	0	10	0	0	0	0	0
Earl Bamber	New Zealand	2008–09	0	6 (5)	0	0	1	0	8
Nathanaël Berthon	France	2011	0	4	0	0	0	0	0
Jules Bianchi	France	2009–10–2011	0	10	1	1	3	2	26
Sam Bird	United Kingdom	2009–10–2011	0	12	0	0	1	1	14
Marco Bonanomi	Italy	2008–2008–09	0	18	0	1	1	0	9
Will Bratt	United Kingdom	2009–10	0	8	0	0	0	0	0
Sébastien Buemi	Switzerland	2008	0	10	0	1	5	1	37
Yelmer Buurman	Netherlands	2008–2009–10	0	18 (16)	0	0	1	0	17
Andrea Caldarelli	Italy	2011	0	4	0	0	0	0	0
Johnny Cecotto Jr.	Venezuela	2009–10–2011	0	6	0	0	0	0	3
Karun Chandhok	India	2008–2008–09	0	12	0	0	1	0	7
Kevin Nai Chia Chen	Taiwan	2008–09	0	12 (11)	0	0	0	0	0
Max Chilton	United Kingdom	2009–10–2011	0	12	0	0	0	0	2
Dani Clos	Spain	2009–10–2011	0	8	0	1	1	0	8
Stefano Coletti	Monaco	2011	0	4	0	1	1	0	11
Fabrizio Crestani	Italy	2008–09	0	10 (9)	0	0	0	0	0
Jérôme d'Ambrosio	Belgium	2008–2008–09	0	22 (21)	1	0	6	3	48
Michael Dalle Stelle	Italy	2008–09	0	10 (9)	0	0	0	0	0
Armaan Ebrahim	India	2008	0	10	0	0	0	0	0
Marcus Ericsson	Sweden	2009–10–2011	0	8	0	0	1	0	9
Fairuz Fauzy	Malaysia	2008, 2011	0	14	0	1	3	1	25
Luca Filippi	Italy	2008–2011	0	22	1	1	3	1	33
Rodolfo González	Venezuela	2008–09–2011	0	14	0	0	0	0	0
Romain Grosjean	France	2008, 2011	2 (2008, 2011)	14	6	5	7	6	85
Esteban Gutiérrez	Mexico	2011	0	4	0	0	0	0	3
Ben Hanley	United Kingdom	2008	0	8	0	0	1	0	6
Michael Herck	Romania	2008–2011	0	32 (31)	0	0	1	0	16
Nico Hülkenberg	Germany	2008–09	0	4	2	1	1	1	27
Carlos Iaconelli	Brazil	2008–09	0	2	0	0	0	0	0
James Jakes	United Kingdom	2008–09–2011	0	16 (15)	0	0	2	1	13
Stephen Jelley	United Kingdom	2008	0	9	0	0	0	0	0
Adam Khan	Pakistan	2008	0	4	0	0	0	0	0
Kamui Kobayashi	Japan	2008–2008–09	1 (2008–09)	22 (21)	2	4	7	4	78
Josef Král	Czech Republic	2009–10–2011	0	12	0	0	2	0	16
Plamen Kralev	Bulgaria	2009–10	0	8	0	0	0	0	0
Julián Leal	Italy	2011	0	4	0	0	0	0	0
Fabio Leimer	Switzerland	2009–10–2011	0	12	0	0	1	0	9
Mika Mäki	Finland	2008–09	0	2	0	0	0	0	0
Pastor Maldonado	Venezuela	2008–09	0	6 (5)	0	0	1	0	7
Edoardo Mortara	Italy	2008–09	0	8	0	0	1	0	11
Diego Nunes	Brazil	2008–2009–10	0	24 (22)	0	2	2	0	26
Jolyon Palmer	United Kingdom	2011	0	4	0	0	0	0	0
Álvaro Parente	Portugal	2008–09–2009–10	0	10	0	0	1	1	13
Miloš Pavlović	Serbia	2008	0	10	0	0	0	0	6
Sergio Pérez	Mexico	2008–09–2009–10	0	16 (15)	0	2	3	1	31
Vitaly Petrov	Russia	2008–2008–09	0	22 (21)	1	2	7	0	61
Nelson Philippe	France	2008–09	0	2	0	0	0	0	0
Charles Pic	France	2009–10–2011	0	12	1	1	2	0	18
Edoardo Piscopo	Italy	2009–10	0	8 (7)	0	0	0	0	3
Frankie Provenzano	Italy	2008–09	0	4	0	0	0	0	0
Marcello Puglisi	Italy	2008	0	10	0	0	0	0	0
Luiz Razia	Brazil	2008–09–2011	0	20 (19)	0	1	1	0	9
Giacomo Ricci	Italy	2008–09–2009–10	0	20 (19)	0	1	3	1	29
Davide Rigon	Italy	2008–09	0	6	0	0	1	0	6
Roldán Rodríguez	Spain	2008–2009–10	0	16 (15)	1	1	3	0	35
Jake Rosenzweig	United States	2009–10	0	4	0	0	0	0	0
Alexander Rossi	United States	2009–10	0	8	0	0	0	0	12
Harald Schlegelmilch	Latvia	2008	0	10	0	0	0	0	3
Yuhi Sekiguchi	Japan	2008–09	0	2	0	0	0	0	0
Bruno Senna	Brazil	2008	0	10	0	0	2	3	23
Andy Soucek	Spain	2008	0	2	0	0	1	0	6
Jason Tahinci	Turkey	2008	0	10	0	0	0	0	0
Ricardo Teixeira	Portugal	2008–09	0	4	0	0	0	0	0
Ho-Pin Tung	China	2008	0	10	0	0	0	0	1
Oliver Turvey	United Kingdom	2009–10–2011	0	12	0	1	1	0	17
Alberto Valerio	Brazil	2008–2009–10	0	14 (13)	0	0	0	0	2
Adrián Vallés	Spain	2008–2008–09	0	12	0	0	1	0	19
Davide Valsecchi	Italy	2008–2011	1 (2009–10)	34 (33)	1	4	11	4	116
Chris van der Drift	New Zealand	2008–09	0	4 (3)	0	0	0	0	5
Giedo van der Garde	Netherlands	2008–09–2011	0	18 (16)	0	0	2	0	27
Renger van der Zande	Netherlands	2008–09	0	2 (1)	0	0	0	0	0
Pål Varhaug	Norway	2011	0	4	0	0	0	0	1
Christian Vietoris	Germany	2009–10	0	8	0	1	1	0	9
Javier Villa	Spain	2008–09–2009–10	0	18 (17)	0	0	3	2	31
Sakon Yamamoto	Japan	2008–09	0	12 (11)	0	0	1	0	13
Alex Yoong	Malaysia	2008–09	0	4 (3)	0	0	0	0	0
Hiroki Yoshimoto	Japan	2008–2008–09	0	12	0	0	0	0	13
Daniel Zampieri	Italy	2009–10	0	6	0	0	0	0	0
Adrian Zaugg	South Africa	2009–10	0	2	0	0	0	0	1
Andreas Zuber	United Arab Emirates	2008–09	0	4 (3)	0	0	0	0	0

== By nationality ==
Country	Total Drivers	Champions	Championships	First driver(s)	Last driver(s)
Bahrain	1	0	0	Hamad Al Fardan (2008–09)	Hamad Al Fardan (2008–09)
Belgium	1	0	0	Jérôme d'Ambrosio (2008)	Jérôme d'Ambrosio (2008–09)
Brazil	5	0	0	Diego Nunes, Bruno Senna, Alberto Valerio (2008)	Luiz Razia
Bulgaria	2	0	0	Vladimir Arabadzhiev, Plamen Kralev (2009–10)	Vladimir Arabadzhiev, Plamen Kralev (2009–10)
China	1	0	0	Ho-Pin Tung (2008)	Ho-Pin Tung (2008)
Czech Republic	1	0	0	Josef Král (2009–10)	Josef Král
Denmark	1	0	0	Christian Bakkerud (2008)	Christian Bakkerud (2008)
Finland	1	0	0	Mika Mäki (2008–09)	Mika Mäki (2008–09)
France	5	1 (Grosjean)	2 (2008, 2011)	Romain Grosjean (2008)	Nathanaël Berthon, Jules Bianchi, Romain Grosjean, Charles Pic
Germany	2	0	0	Nico Hülkenberg (2008–09)	Christian Vietoris (2009–10)
India	2	0	0	Karun Chandhok, Armaan Ebrahim (2008)	Karun Chandhok (2008–09)
Italy	14	1 (Valsecchi)	1 (2009–10)	Marco Bonanomi, Luca Filippi, Marcello Puglisi (2008)	Andrea Caldarelli, Luca Filippi, Julián Leal, Davide Valsecchi
Japan	4	1 (Kobayashi)	1 (2008–09)	Kamui Kobayashi, Hiroki Yoshimoto (2008)	Kamui Kobayashi, Yuhi Sekiguchi, Sakon Yamamoto, Hiroki Yoshimoto (2008–09)
Latvia	1	0	0	Harald Schlegelmilch (2008)	Harald Schlegelmilch (2008)
Malaysia	2	0	0	Fairuz Fauzy (2008)	Fairuz Fauzy
Mexico	2	0	0	Sergio Pérez (2008–09)	Esteban Gutiérrez
Monaco	1	0	0	Stefano Coletti (2011)	Stefano Coletti
Netherlands	3	0	0	Yelmer Buurman (2008)	Giedo van der Garde
New Zealand	2	0	0	Earl Bamber, Chris van der Drift (2008–09)	Earl Bamber, Chris van der Drift (2008–09)
Norway	1	0	0	Pål Varhaug (2011)	Pål Varhaug
Pakistan	1	0	0	Adam Khan (2008)	Adam Khan (2008)
Portugal	2	0	0	Álvaro Parente, Ricardo Teixeira (2008–09)	Álvaro Parente (2009–10)
Romania	1	0	0	Michael Herck (2008)	Michael Herck
Russia	2	0	0	Vitaly Petrov (2008)	Mikhail Aleshin
Serbia	1	0	0	Miloš Pavlović (2008)	Miloš Pavlović (2008)
South Africa	1	0	0	Adrian Zaugg (2009-10)	Adrian Zaugg (2009-10)
Spain	5	0	0	Roldán Rodríguez, Andy Soucek, Adrián Vallés (2008)	Dani Clos
Sweden	1	0	0	Marcus Ericsson (2009–10)	Marcus Ericsson
Switzerland	2	0	0	Sébastien Buemi (2008)	Fabio Leimer
Taiwan	1	0	0	Kevin Nai Chia Chen (2008–09)	Kevin Nai Chia Chen (2008–09)
Turkey	1	0	0	Jason Tahinci (2008)	Jason Tahinci (2008)
United Arab Emirates	1	0	0	Andreas Zuber (2008–09)	Andreas Zuber (2008–09)
United Kingdom	8	0	0	Ben Hanley, Stephen Jelley (2008)	Sam Bird, Max Chilton, Jolyon Palmer, Oliver Turvey
United States	2	0	0	Alexander Rossi (2009–10)	Jake Rosenzweig, Alexander Rossi (2009–10)
Venezuela	3	0	0	Rodolfo González, Pastor Maldonado (2008–09)	Johnny Cecotto Jr., Rodolfo González

== See also ==
- List of GP2 Series drivers
