= Parratt =

Parratt is a surname. Notable people with the surname include:

- Joe Parratt or Joe Beagle, award-winning songwriter
- John Parratt (1859–1905), English first-class cricketer
- Lyman G. Parratt (1908–1995), physicist
- Peggy Parratt, professional football player who played in the "Ohio League"
- Percy Parratt (1887–1971), Australian rules footballer
- Tom Parratt (born 1986), Scottish professional footballer
- Walter Parratt KCVO (1841–1924), English organist and composer

== See also ==
- Parratt v. Taylor, 451 U.S. 527 (1981), a case decided by the United States Supreme Court
- Barratt (disambiguation)
- Parret
- Parrot
- Parrott (disambiguation)
