= List of GP2 Series drivers =

This list of GP2 Series drivers includes drivers who have made at least one race start in the GP2 Series. This list does not include drivers who have only appeared in the sister GP2 Asia Series (see List of GP2 Asia Series drivers). This list is accurate up to and including the last round of the 2016 season (Abu Dhabi). It does not include data from the non-championship races held in 2011.

== By name ==
Key
Symbol	Meaning
~	Driver competed in the last Formula One race
^	Driver has competed in Formula One but not the last race

Name	License	Seasons	Championship titles	Races (Starts)	Poles	Wins	Podiums	Fastest Laps	Points
Daniel Abt	Germany	2013–2014	0	42	1 (Note: Pole scored as a result of the reverse grid in the sprint race.)	0	0	0	38
Filipe Albuquerque	Portugal	2007	0	4	0	0	0	0	0
Mikhail Aleshin	Russia	2007, 2011	0	12 (10)	0	0	0	0	3
Juan Cruz Álvarez	Argentina	2005	0	23	0	0	0	0	4.5
Zoël Amberg	Switzerland	2015	0	10 (6)	0	0	0	0	0
Michael Ammermüller	Germany	2006–2007	0	27	0	1	3	0	26
Vladimir Arabadzhiev	Bulgaria	2010	0	16	0	0	0	0	0
Philo Paz Armand	Indonesia	2016	0	22	0	0	0	0	0
Can Artam	Turkey	2005	0	23	0	0	0	0	2
Marko Asmer	Estonia	2008	0	14 (13)	0	0	0	0	0
Christian Bakkerud	Denmark	2007–2008	0	23 (19)	0	0	0	0	0
Emil Bernstorff	United Kingdom	2016	0	2	0	0	0	0	0
Nathanaël Berthon	France	2012–2015	0	88	0	1	4	5	125
Jules Bianchi^	France	2010–2011	0	38 (37)	5 (Note: 4 poles achieved during qualifying, and 1 pole scored as a result of the reverse grid in the sprint race.)	1	10	1	105
René Binder	Austria	2012–2016	0	74 (73)	0	0	0	0	16
Sam Bird	United Kingdom	2010–2011, 2013	0	60 (59)	6 (Note: 4 poles achieved during qualifying, and 2 poles scored as a result of the reverse grid in the sprint race.)	6	14	10	274
Gianmaria Bruni^	Italy	2005–2006	0	42	4 (Note: 3 poles achieved during qualifying, and 1 pole scored as a result of the reverse grid in the sprint race.)	3	4	2	68
Sébastien Buemi^	Switzerland	2007–2008	0	31 (30)	0	2	5	3	56
Yelmer Buurman	Netherlands	2008	0	10	0	0	1	0	5
James Calado	United Kingdom	2012–2013	0	46	6 (Note: 2 poles achieved during qualifying, and 4 poles scored as a result of the reverse grid in the sprint race.)	4	14	1	317
Sergio Campana	Italy	2013–2014	0	6	0	0	0	0	0
Sergio Canamasas	Spain	2012–2016	0	92 (91)	0	0	2	3	76
Adam Carroll	United Kingdom	2005–2008, 2011	0	72	3 (Note: 1 pole achieved during qualifying, and 2 poles scored as a result of the reverse grid in the sprint race.)	5	14	2	129
Kevin Ceccon	Italy	2011, 2013	0	20 (19)	0	0	1	0	28
Johnny Cecotto Jr.	Venezuela	2009–2016	0	120 (118)	5 (Note: 3 poles achieved during qualifying, and 2 poles scored as a result of the reverse grid in the sprint race.)	4	10	1	306
Karun Chandhok^	India	2007–2009	0	61 (60)	2 (Note: All poles scored as a result of the reverse grid in the sprint race.)	2	5	2	57
Max Chilton^	United Kingdom	2010–2012	0	62	3 (Note: 2 poles achieved during qualifying, and 1 pole scored as a result of the reverse grid in the sprint race.)	2	4	1	176
Dani Clos	Spain	2009–2013	0	72 (71)	3 (Note: 1 pole achieved during qualifying, and 2 poles scored as a result of the reverse grid in the sprint race.)	1	9	1	110
Stefano Coletti	Monaco	2009, 2011–2014	0	88 (86)	2 (Note: 1 pole achieved during qualifying, and 1 pole scored as a result of the reverse grid in the sprint race.)	7	15	8	343
Mike Conway	United Kingdom	2006–2008	0	43	2 (Note: All poles scored as a result of the reverse grid in the sprint race.)	1	2	2	39
Fabrizio Crestani	Italy	2010, 2012–2013	0	24 (23)	0	0	0	2	1
Conor Daly	United States	2013–2014	0	20	0	0	0	0	4
Jérôme d'Ambrosio^	Belgium	2008–2010	0	58	3 (Note: 1 pole achieved during qualifying, and 2 poles scored as a result of the reverse grid in the sprint race.)	1	7	0	71
Daniël de Jong	Netherlands	2012–2016	0	92 (91)	1 (Note: Pole scored as a result of the reverse grid in the sprint race.)	0	0	1	12
Louis Delétraz	Switzerland	2016	0	2	0	0	0	0	0
Lucas di Grassi^	Brazil	2006–2009	0	75	2 (Note: 1 pole achieved during qualifying, and 1 pole scored as a result of the reverse grid in the sprint race.)	5	21	6	211
Tom Dillmann	France	2012–2014	0	44 (43)	5 (Note: 1 pole achieved during qualifying, and 4 poles scored as a result of the reverse grid in the sprint race.)	1	4	2	139
Tio Ellinas	Cyprus	2014	0	8	0	0	0	1	7
Marcus Ericsson^	Sweden	2010–2013	0	84	2 (Note: All poles achieved during qualifying.)	3	13	1	281
Jimmy Eriksson	Sweden	2016	0	18	0	0	0	0	10
Mitch Evans	New Zealand	2013–2016	0	88 (86)	2 (Note: All poles scored as a result of the reverse grid in the sprint race.)	5	18	8	455
Fairuz Fauzy	Malaysia	2005–2006, 2011	0	62	0	0	0	0	5
Luca Filippi	Italy	2006–2012	0	111 (110)	5 (Note: 3 poles achieved during qualifying, and 2 poles scored as a result of the reverse grid in the sprint race.)	6	17	7	200
Robin Frijns	Netherlands	2013	0	12	0	1	2	0	47
Borja García	Spain	2005, 2007	0	43	1 (Note: Pole scored as a result of the reverse grid in the sprint race.)	0	2	0	45.5
Pierre Gasly~	France	2014–2016	1 (2016)	50	8 (Note: All poles achieved during qualifying.)	4	13	3	329
Sean Gelael	Indonesia	2015–2016	0	32	0	0	1	0	24
Luca Ghiotto	Italy	2016	0	22	0	1	4	3	111
Vittorio Ghirelli	Italy	2013	0	10	0	0	0	0	1
Kevin Giovesi	Italy	2013–2014	0	10	0	0	0	0	0
Antonio Giovinazzi^	Italy	2016	0	22	3 (Note: 2 poles achieved during qualifying, and 1 pole scored as a result of the reverse grid in the sprint race.)	5	8	2	211
Timo Glock^	Germany	2006–2007	1 (2007)	42 (40)	4 (Note: All poles achieved during qualifying.)	7	15	5	146
Tristan Gommendy	France	2006	0	9	0	0	0	0	6
Rodolfo González	Venezuela	2009–2012	0	64	1 (Note: Pole scored as a result of the reverse grid in the sprint race.)	0	0	0	10
Romain Grosjean^	France	2008–2011	1 (2011)	58	5 (Note: All poles achieved during qualifying.)	9	21	10	210
Victor Guerin	Brazil	2012	0	18 (17)	0	0	0	1	0
Esteban Gutiérrez^	Mexico	2011–2012	0	42 (41)	1 (Note: Pole scored as a result of the reverse grid in the sprint race.)	4	8	5	191
Lewis Hamilton~	United Kingdom	2006	1 (2006)	21	1 (Note: Pole achieved during qualifying.)	5	14	7	114
Ben Hanley	United Kingdom	2008	0	8	0	0	0	0	1
Brendon Hartley^	New Zealand	2010–2012	0	12	0	0	0	0	6
Rio Haryanto^	Indonesia	2012–2015	0	90	2 (Note: 1 pole achieved during qualifying, and 1 pole scored as a result of the reverse grid in the sprint race.)	3	7	0	226
Michael Herck	Romania	2008–2011	0	72 (70)	1 (Note: Pole scored as a result of the reverse grid in the sprint race.)	0	1	1	13
Sergio Hernández	Spain	2005–2007	0	45	0	0	0	0	4
Kohei Hirate	Japan	2007	0	21	0	0	1	0	9
Nico Hülkenberg~	Germany	2009	1 (2009)	20	3 (Note: All poles achieved during qualifying.)	5	10	5	100
Carlos Iaconelli	Brazil	2008	0	14 (13)	0	0	0	0	0
Takuya Izawa	Japan	2014	0	22	0	0	1	0	26
James Jakes	United Kingdom	2010	0	2	0	0	0	0	0
Neel Jani	Switzerland	2005–2006	0	27	1 (Note: Pole achieved during qualifying.)	2	2	0	48
Axcil Jefferies	Zimbabwe	2014	0	2	0	0	0	0	0
Nabil Jeffri	Malaysia	2016	0	22	0	0	0	0	2
Sérgio Jimenez	Brazil	2007	0	5	0	0	0	0	4
Henri Karjalainen	Finland	2007	0	2	0	0	0	0	0
Jordan King	United Kingdom	2015–2016	0	44	5 (Note: All poles scored as a result of the reverse grid in the sprint race.)	2	6	0	182
Marvin Kirchhöfer	Germany	2016	0	20	0	0	1	0	21
Kamui Kobayashi^	Japan	2008–2009	0	40	3 (Note: All poles scored as a result of the reverse grid in the sprint race.)	1	2	2	23
Heikki Kovalainen^	Finland	2005	0	23	2 (Note: All poles achieved during qualifying.)	5	12	1	105
Josef Král	Czech Republic	2010–2012	0	44	3 (Note: All poles scored as a result of the reverse grid in the sprint race.)	1	3	0	45
Jon Lancaster	United Kingdom	2012–2015	0	36	0	2	3	2	79
Nicolas Lapierre	France	2005–2007	0	61 (58)	3 (Note: 2 poles achieved during qualifying, and 1 pole scored as a result of the reverse grid in the sprint race.)	2	6	4	76
Nicholas Latifi^	Canada	2014–2016	0	32	0	0	1	0	23
Mathias Lauda	Austria	2005	0	23	0	0	0	0	3
Julián Leal	Italy; Colombia	2011–2015	0	102	2 (Note: All poles scored as a result of the reverse grid in the sprint race.)	0	4	5	177
Fabio Leimer	Switzerland	2010–2013	1 (2013)	84 (83)	4 (Note: 2 poles achieved during qualifying, and 2 poles scored as a result of the reverse grid in the sprint race.)	5	16	3	376
Federico Leo	Italy	2010	0	2	0	0	0	0	0
José María López	Argentina	2005–2006	0	44	2 (Note: 1 pole achieved during qualifying, and 1 pole scored as a result of the reverse grid in the sprint race.)	1	6	1	66
Alex Lynn	United Kingdom	2015–2016	0	44	5 (Note: 2 poles achieved during qualifying, and 3 poles scored as a result of the reverse grid in the sprint race.)	5	9	3	234
Ma Qinghua	China	2013	0	2 (1)	0	0	0	0	0
Pastor Maldonado^	Venezuela	2007–2010	1 (2010)	73 (72)	4 (Note: 3 poles achieved during qualifying, and 1 pole scored as a result of the reverse grid in the sprint race.)	10	18	7	208
Gustav Malja	Sweden	2015–2016	0	28	1 (Note: Pole scored as a result of the reverse grid in the sprint race.)	0	2	0	54
Raffaele Marciello	Italy	2014–2016	0	66	3 (Note: 1 pole achieved during qualifying, and 2 poles scored as a result of the reverse grid in the sprint race.)	1	14	2	343
Jann Mardenborough	United Kingdom	2015	0	2	0	0	0	0	0
Artem Markelov	Russia	2014–2016	0	66	0	1	3	3	151
Marcos Martínez	Spain	2007	0	10 (8)	0	0	0	0	5
Nobuharu Matsushita	Japan	2015–2016	0	42	2 (Note: All poles scored as a result of the reverse grid in the sprint race.)	2	5	5	160.5
Nigel Melker	Netherlands	2012	0	24 (23)	0	0	0	0	25
Kevin Mirocha	Germany	2011	0	14 (12)	0	0	0	0	0
Giorgio Mondini	Switzerland	2005	0	10	0	0	0	0	0
Ferdinando Monfardini	Italy	2005–2006	0	42 (39)	2 (Note: All poles scored as a result of the reverse grid in the sprint race.)	0	0	0	11
Edoardo Mortara	Italy	2009	0	20	1 (Note: Pole scored as a result of the reverse grid in the sprint race.)	1	1	2	19
Kazuki Nakajima^	Japan	2007	0	21	1 (Note: Pole achieved during qualifying.)	0	6	3	44
Felipe Nasr^	Brazil	2012–2014	0	68	3 (Note: 1 pole achieved during qualifying, and 2 poles scored as a result of the reverse grid in the sprint race.)	4	20	2	473
Norman Nato	France	2015–2016	0	44	2 (Note: 1 pole achieved during qualifying, and 1 pole scored as a result of the reverse grid in the sprint race.)	2	5	3	156
Alexandre Negrão	Brazil	2005–2007	0	65 (64)	3 (Note: All poles scored as a result of the reverse grid in the sprint race.)	0	1	1	25
André Negrão	Brazil	2014–2015	0	42	0	0	0	0	36
Patric Niederhauser	Switzerland	2015	0	2	0	0	0	0	0
Markus Niemelä	Finland	2007	0	7	0	0	0	0	0
Paolo Nocera	Italy	2008	0	2	0	0	0	0	0
Diego Nunes	Brazil	2008–2009	0	40	0	0	1	1	11
Fabio Onidi	Italy	2012	0	24	1 (Note: Pole scored as a result of the reverse grid in the sprint race.)	0	0	1	13
Jolyon Palmer^	United Kingdom	2011–2014	1 (2014)	86 (84)	5 (Note: 4 poles achieved during qualifying, and 1 pole scored as a result of the reverse grid in the sprint race.)	7	18	6	473
Nelson Panciatici	France	2009	0	16	0	0	0	0	0
Giorgio Pantano^	Italy	2005–2008	1 (2008)	78 (77)	6 (Note: All poles achieved during qualifying.)	9	23	5	228
Álvaro Parente	Portugal	2008–2011	0	56	1 (Note: Pole achieved during qualifying.)	2	9	1	85
Miloš Pavlović	Serbia	2008	0	6 (3)	0	0	0	0	0
Franck Perera	France	2006, 2009	0	28 (26)	0	0	1	0	8
Sergio Pérez^	Mexico	2009–2010	0	40	2 (Note: 1 pole achieved during qualifying, and 1 pole scored as a result of the reverse grid in the sprint race.)	5	9	7	93
Vitaly Petrov^	Russia	2006–2009	0	69	2 (Note: All poles achieved during qualifying.)	4	11	1	135
Arthur Pic	France	2014–2016	0	62	2 (Note: All poles scored as a result of the reverse grid in the sprint race.)	1	6	1	220
Charles Pic^	France	2010–2011	0	38 (37)	5 (Note: 4 poles achieved during qualifying, and 1 pole scored as a result of the reverse grid in the sprint race.)	3	7	1	80
Clivio Piccione	Monaco	2005–2006	0	44	2 (Note: All poles scored as a result of the reverse grid in the sprint race.)	1	3	1	32
Nelson Piquet Jr.^	Brazil	2005–2006	0	44 (43)	6 (Note: All poles achieved during qualifying.)	5	13	4	148
Edoardo Piscopo	Italy	2010	0	2	0	0	0	0	2
Antônio Pizzonia^	Brazil	2007	0	5	0	0	0	0	1
Olivier Pla	France	2005–2007	0	36 (35)	2 (Note: All poles scored as a result of the reverse grid in the sprint race.)	2	2	1	20
Félix Porteiro	Spain	2006	0	21	1 (Note: Pole scored as a result of the reverse grid in the sprint race.)	0	0	0	5
Alexandre Prémat	France	2005–2006	0	44	1 (Note: Pole achieved during qualifying.)	3	15	5	133
Marcello Puglisi	Italy	2008	0	2	0	0	0	0	0
Adrian Quaife-Hobbs	United Kingdom	2013–2014	0	40	1 (Note: Pole scored as a result of the reverse grid in the sprint race.)	1	4	1	86
Gianmarco Raimondo	Canada	2013	0	4	0	0	0	0	0
Luiz Razia	Brazil	2009–2012	0	80	3 (Note: 1 pole achieved during qualifying, and 2 poles scored as a result of the reverse grid in the sprint race.)	5	15	1	277
Facu Regalia	Argentina	2014	0	8	0	0	0	0	0
Giacomo Ricci	Italy	2008–2010	0	26 (25)	1 (Note: Pole scored as a result of the reverse grid in the sprint race.)	1	2	0	16
Stéphane Richelmi	Monaco	2011–2014	0	70	6 (Note: 4 poles achieved during qualifying, and 2 poles scored as a result of the reverse grid in the sprint race.)	1	4	2	201
Davide Rigon	Italy	2009, 2011	0	20	1 (Note: Pole scored as a result of the reverse grid in the sprint race.)	0	0	0	3
Ricardo Risatti	Argentina	2007	0	6	1 (Note: Pole scored as a result of the reverse grid in the sprint race.)	0	0	0	1
Roldán Rodríguez	Spain	2007–2009	0	61	1 (Note: Pole scored as a result of the reverse grid in the sprint race.)	0	4	1	53
Nico Rosberg^	Germany	2005	1 (2005)	23	5 (Note: 4 poles achieved during qualifying, and 1 pole as a result of the reverse grid in the sprint race.)	5	12	5	120
Jake Rosenzweig	United States	2012–2013	0	26	0	0	0	0	0
Alexander Rossi^	United States	2013–2015	0	54	4 (Note: 2 poles achieved during qualifying, and 2 poles scored as a result of the reverse grid in the sprint race.)	4	11	2	285.5
Oliver Rowland	United Kingdom	2015–2016	0	30	0	0	4	1	110
Kimiya Sato	Japan	2014	0	20	0	0	0	0	2
Bruno Senna^	Brazil	2007–2008	0	41	3 (Note: All poles achieved during qualifying.)	3	9	1	98
Giancarlo Serenelli	Venezuela	2012	0	18	0	0	0	0	0
Ryan Sharp	United Kingdom	2005	0	13	0	0	0	1	2
Sergey Sirotkin^	Russia	2015–2016	0	44	4 (Note: All poles achieved during qualifying.)	3	13	2	298
Marco Sørensen	Denmark	2014–2015	0	22	1 (Note: Pole scored as a result of the reverse grid in the sprint race.)	1	1	0	47
Andy Soucek	Spain	2007–2008	0	39	1 (Note: Pole scored as a result of the reverse grid in the sprint race.)	0	3	1	29
Scott Speed^	United States	2005	0	23	1 (Note: Pole achieved during qualifying.)	0	5	5	67.5
Richie Stanaway	New Zealand	2015	0	18	0	2	2	1	60
Marlon Stöckinger	Philippines	2015	0	22	0	0	0	2	0
Dean Stoneman	United Kingdom	2015	0	6	0	0	0	0	1
Jason Tahincioğlu	Turkey	2006–2007	0	42 (40)	0	0	0	0	0
Ricardo Teixeira	Portugal	2009, 2012–2013	0	46 (44)	0	0	0	0	0
Simon Trummer	Switzerland	2012–2015	0	72	0	0	1	2	50
Ho-Pin Tung	China	2007–2008, 2010	0	57 (56)	1 (Note: Pole scored as a result of the reverse grid in the sprint race.)	0	1	0	11
Oliver Turvey	United Kingdom	2010–2011	0	22	3 (Note: 1 pole achieved during qualifying, and 2 poles scored as a result of the reverse grid in the sprint race.)	0	4	1	47
Alberto Valerio	Brazil	2008–2010	0	54 (53)	3 (Note: All poles scored as a result of the reverse grid in the sprint race.)	1	1	1	20
Adrián Vallés	Spain	2006, 2008	0	39	0	0	1	3	12
Davide Valsecchi	Italy	2008–2012	1 (2012)	98 (96)	4 (Note: 3 poles achieved during qualifying, and 1 pole scored as a result of the reverse grid in the sprint race.)	7	17	4	331
Meindert van Buuren	Netherlands	2015	0	2 (1)	0	0	0	0	0
Giedo van der Garde^	Netherlands	2009–2012	0	82	6 (Note: 3 poles achieved during qualifying, and 3 poles as a result of the reverse grid in the sprint race.)	5	18	3	282
Stoffel Vandoorne^	Belgium	2014–2015	1 (2015)	44	8 (Note: All poles achieved during qualifying.)	11	26	8	570.5
Pål Varhaug	Norway	2011, 2013	0	22	0	0	0	0	0
Christian Vietoris	Germany	2010–2011	0	32 (31)	2 (Note: 1 pole achieved during qualifying, and 1 pole scored as a result of the reverse grid in the sprint race.)	3	6	1	64
Toni Vilander	Finland	2005	0	4	0	0	0	0	0
Javier Villa	Spain	2006–2009	0	81	4 (Note: All poles scored as a result of the reverse grid in the sprint race.)	3	8	0	77
Ernesto Viso	Venezuela	2005–2007	0	47 (46)	3 (Note: All poles scored as a result of the reverse grid in the sprint race.)	2	6	2	63
Robert Vișoiu	Romania	2015	0	18	0	0	0	1	20
Sakon Yamamoto^	Japan	2007–2008	0	21	0	0	0	0	3
Nick Yelloly	United Kingdom	2015	0	12	1 (Note: Pole scored as a result of the reverse grid in the sprint race.)	0	0	1	19
Hiroki Yoshimoto	Japan	2005–2006	0	44 (43)	4 (Note: All poles scored as a result of the reverse grid in the sprint race.)	0	2	1	26
Adrian Zaugg	South Africa	2007, 2010	0	39 (38)	0	0	1	0	19
Andreas Zuber	United Arab Emirates	2006–2009	0	80	3 (Note: 1 pole achieved during qualifying, and 2 poles scored as a result of the reverse grid in the sprint race.)	2	11	5	95

== By racing license ==
License	Total Drivers	Champions	Championships	First driver(s)	Last driver(s)
Argentina	4	0	0	Juan Cruz Álvarez, José María López (2005 Imola GP2 Series round)	Facu Regalia (2014 Yas Marina GP2 Series round)
Austria	2	0	0	Mathias Lauda (2005 Imola GP2 Series round)	René Binder (2016 Hockenheimring GP2 Series round)
Belgium	2	1 (Vandoorne)	1 (2015)	Jérôme d'Ambrosio (2008 Catalunya GP2 Series round)	Stoffel Vandoorne (2015 Yas Marina GP2 Series round)
Brazil	13	0	0	Alexandre Negrão, Nelson Piquet Jr. (2005 Imola GP2 Series round)	André Negrão (2015 Yas Marina GP2 Series round)
Bulgaria	1	0	0	Vladimir Arabadzhiev (2010 Catalunya GP2 Series round)	Vladimir Arabadzhiev (2010 Spa-Francorchamps GP2 Series round)
Canada	2	0	0	Gianmarco Raimondo (2013 Marina Bay GP2 Series round)	Nicholas Latifi (2016 Yas Marina GP2 Series round)
China	2	0	0	Ho-Pin Tung (2007 Bahrain GP2 Series round)	Ma Qinghua (2013 Sepang GP2 Series round)
Colombia	1	0	0	Julián Leal (Note: Leal previously competed under the Italian flag.) (2013 Sepang GP2 Series round)	Julián Leal (2015 Monza GP2 Series round)
Cyprus	1	0	0	Tio Ellinas (2014 Catalunya GP2 Series round)	Tio Ellinas (2014 Sochi GP2 Series round)
Czech Republic	1	0	0	Josef Král (2010 Catalunya GP2 Series round)	Josef Král (2012 Spa-Francorchamps GP2 Series round)
Denmark	2	0	0	Christian Bakkerud (2007 Bahrain GP2 Series round)	Marco Sørensen (2015 Red Bull Ring GP2 Series round)
Estonia	1	0	0	Marko Asmer (2008 Magny-Cours GP2 Series round)	Marko Asmer (2008 Monza GP2 Series round)
Finland	4	0	0	Heikki Kovalainen (2005 Imola GP2 Series round)	Markus Niemelä (2007 Valencia GP2 Series round)
France	14	2 (Grosjean, Gasly)	2 (2011, 2016)	Nicolas Lapierre, Oliver Pla, Alexandre Prémat (2005 Imola GP2 Series round)	Pierre Gasly, Norman Nato (2016 Yas Marina GP2 Series round)
Germany	8	3 (Rosberg, Glock, Hülkenberg)	3 (2005, 2007, 2009)	Nico Rosberg (2005 Imola GP2 Series round)	Marvin Kirchhöfer (2016 Sepang GP2 Series round)
India	1	0	0	Karun Chandhok (2007 Bahrain GP2 Series round)	Karun Chandhok (2009 Algarve GP2 Series round)
Indonesia	3	0	0	Rio Haryanto (2012 Sepang GP2 Series round)	Sean Gelael, Philo Paz Armand (2016 Yas Marina GP2 Series round)
Italy	22	2 (Pantano, Valsecchi)	2 (2008, 2012)	Gianmaria Bruni, Ferdinando Monfardini, Giorgio Pantano (2005 Imola GP2 Series round)	Raffaele Marciello, Luca Ghiotto, Antonio Giovinazzi (2016 Yas Marina GP2 Series round)
Japan	8	0	0	Hiroki Yoshimoto (2005 Imola GP2 Series round)	Nobuharu Matsushita (2016 Yas Marina GP2 Series round)
Malaysia	2	0	0	Fairuz Fauzy (2005 Imola GP2 Series round)	Nabil Jeffri (2016 Yas Marina GP2 Series round)
Mexico	2	0	0	Sergio Pérez (2009 Catalunya GP2 Series round)	Esteban Gutiérrez (2012 Marina Bay GP2 Series round)
Monaco	3	0	0	Clivio Piccione (2005 Imola GP2 Series round)	Stefano Coletti, Stéphane Richelmi (2014 Yas Marina GP2 Series round)
Netherlands	6	0	0	Yelmer Buurman (2008 Catalunya GP2 Series round)	Daniël de Jong (2016 Yas Marina GP2 Series round)
New Zealand	3	0	0	Brendon Hartley (2010 Monza GP2 Series round)	Mitch Evans (2016 Yas Marina GP2 Series round)
Norway	1	0	0	Pål Varhaug (2011 Istanbul Park GP2 Series round)	Pål Varhaug (2013 Bahrain GP2 Series round)
Philippines	1	0	0	Marlon Stöckinger (2015 Bahrain GP2 Series round)	Marlon Stöckinger (2015 Yas Marina GP2 Series round)
Portugal	3	0	0	Filipe Albuquerque (2007 Silverstone GP2 Series round)	Ricardo Teixeira (2013 Spa-Francorchamps GP2 Series round)
Romania	2	0	0	Michael Herck (2008 Magny-Cours GP2 Series round)	Robert Vișoiu (2015 Sochi GP2 Series round)
Russia	4	0	0	Vitaly Petrov (2006 Hockenheimring GP2 Series round)	Artem Markelov, Sergey Sirotkin (2016 Yas Marina GP2 Series round)
Serbia	1	0	0	Miloš Pavlović (2008 Catalunya GP2 Series round)	Miloš Pavlović (2008 Monaco GP2 Series round)
South Africa	1	0	0	Adrian Zaugg (2007 Bahrain GP2 Series round)	Adrian Zaugg (2010 Yas Marina GP2 Series round)
Spain	10	0	0	Borja García, Sergio Hernández (2005 Imola GP2 Series round)	Sergio Canamasas (2016 Yas Marina GP2 Series round)
Sweden	3	0	0	Marcus Ericsson (2010 Catalunya GP2 Series round)	Gustav Malja (2016 Yas Marina GP2 Series round)
Switzerland	8	1 (Leimer)	1 (2013)	Neel Jani (2005 Imola GP2 Series round)	Louis Delétraz (2016 Yas Marina GP2 Series round)
Turkey	2	0	0	Can Artam (2005 Imola GP2 Series round)	Jason Tahincioğlu (2007 Valencia GP2 Series round)
United Arab Emirates	1	0	0	Andreas Zuber (2006 Valencia GP2 Series round)	Andreas Zuber (2009 Algarve GP2 Series round)
United Kingdom	20	2 (Hamilton, Palmer)	2 (2006, 2014)	Adam Carroll, Ryan Sharp (2005 Imola GP2 Series round)	Emil Bernstorff, Jordan King, Alex Lynn, Oliver Rowland (2016 Yas Marina GP2 Series round)
United States	4	0	0	Scott Speed (2005 Imola GP2 Series round)	Alexander Rossi (2015 Yas Marina GP2 Series round)
Venezuela	5	1 (Maldonado)	1 (2010)	Ernesto Viso (2005 Imola GP2 Series round)	Johnny Cecotto Jr. (2016 Yas Marina GP2 Series round)
Zimbabwe	1	0	0	Axcil Jefferies (2014 Bahrain GP2 Series round)	Axcil Jefferies (2014 Bahrain GP2 Series round)

== See also ==
- List of GP2 Series race winners
- List of GP2 Series driver records
- List of GP2 Asia Series drivers
- List of FIA Formula 2 Championship drivers
