= Barrette (disambiguation) =

A barrette, also known as a hair clip, hair-slide or clasp (in British English), is a clasp for holding hair in place.

Barrette or barette may also refer to:

- Barrette, a bar used to mount miniature medals of chivalric orders or military honours
- "Barrette" (song), a 2013 song by the Japanese female group Nogizaka46
- Barette (sport), or Barrette or Barrette Aquitaine, a form of football originating in the southwest of France
- Hugo Barrette (born 1991), Canadian cyclist
- Simon Jolin-Barrette, Canadian lawyer and politician from Quebec
- John Davenport Barrette or Barette (1862–1934), American Brigadier general during World War I
- Emery G. Barrette (1930-1993), American clergyman and politician

== See also ==
- Barrett (disambiguation)
- Barretter (disambiguation)
- Baretta (disambiguation)
