= Baretta (disambiguation) =

Baretta was an American detective television series that ran from 1975 to 1978.

Baretta may also refer to:

== Places ==
- Baretta, Punjab, or Bareta, an Indian municipality

== People ==
- Baretta (surname), surname

== Other uses ==
- Kramer Baretta, a guitar
- USS Baretta (AN-41), a U.S. Navy ship
- Baretta, members of the Rutaceae genus Helietta (flowering plants)
- "Barrette" (song) by Nogizaka46, pronounced as baretta (バレッタ) in Japanese.

== See also ==
- Barreta Island
- Barretter (disambiguation)
- Bereta (disambiguation)
- Beretta (disambiguation)
- Beretta (surname)
