= Barrett =

Barret, Barrett, or Barretts may refer to:

== People ==
- Barrett (surname), including a list of people with the surname
- Barrett Adair, American political content creator
- Barrett Brown (born 1981), American journalist and activist)
- Barrett Carter (born 2002), American football player
- Barrett Foa, American actor
- Barrett Kent (born 2004), American baseball player
- Barret Robbins (1973–2026), American football player

== Court cases ==
- Barrett v. Rosenthal, a 2006 California Supreme Court case concerning online defamation
- Barrett v. United States (1898), a Supreme Court case regarding subdivision of South Carolina into judicial districts

== Fictional characters ==
- Brenda Barrett, a character on the daytime soap opera General Hospital
- Dana Barrett, a character in the films Ghostbusters and Ghostbusters II, played by Sigourney Weaver
- Elcid Barrett, captain of the Antelope in the folk song "Barrett's Privateers"
- Betty Barrett, a character on the TV show Atomic Betty
- Oliver Barrett, a character in the book Love Story and its film and musical adaptations
- Barret Wallace, a character in the video game Final Fantasy VII

== Organizations ==
- Barrett, The Honors College, Arizona State University
- Barrett Firearms Manufacturing, a weapons manufacturing company
- Barrett Technology, a robotics company
- Barrett-Jackson, a car auction company
- Bill Barrett Corporation, an energy company
- Col. James Barrett Farm, a historic site in Concord, Massachusetts
- Barrett (advertising agency), an advertising agency

== Places & geographic features ==
=== United States ===
- Barrett, Minnesota
- Barrett Mountain, New Hampshire
- Barrett Township, Pennsylvania
- Barrett Township, Perkins County, South Dakota
- Barrett, Texas
- Barrett, West Virginia
- Barrett, U.S. Virgin Islands
- Barrett Dam, reservoir, San Diego, California

=== France ===
- Barret, Charente
- Barret-de-Lioure, Drôme
- Barret-sur-Méouge, Hautes-Alpes
- Breuil-Barret, Vendée
- Pont-de-Barret, Drôme

=== Ireland ===
- Barretts (barony), County Cork

== Weaponry ==
- .416 Barrett
- Barrett M82
- Barrett M90
- Barrett M95
- Barrett M98B
- Barrett M99
- Barrett REC7
- Barrett XM109
- Barrett XM500

== Other ==
- Barrett (album), the second album by Syd Barrett
- Barrett's esophagus, a medical condition
- Barrett reduction, an algorithm in modular arithmetic

== See also ==
- Barratt (disambiguation)
- Barrette (disambiguation)
- Barret Browning
