= Beretta (disambiguation) =

Beretta is an Italian firearms manufacturing company.

Beretta may also refer to:

- Beretta (surname), people with the surname
- Chevrolet Beretta, front-wheel-drive coupé produced by Chevrolet from 1987 to 1996
- Beretta (wrestler), American professional wrestler Gregory Marasciulo
- Fratelli Beretta, an Italian meat products company

== See also ==
- Berreta (band), French rap band made up of Kalash l'Afro, Sheir, Skwal and Belek (1999-2005)
- Biretta, a type of cap
- Baretta, an American television show from the 1970s
- Bereta (disambiguation)
