= Adam Khan =

British-Pakistani racing driver

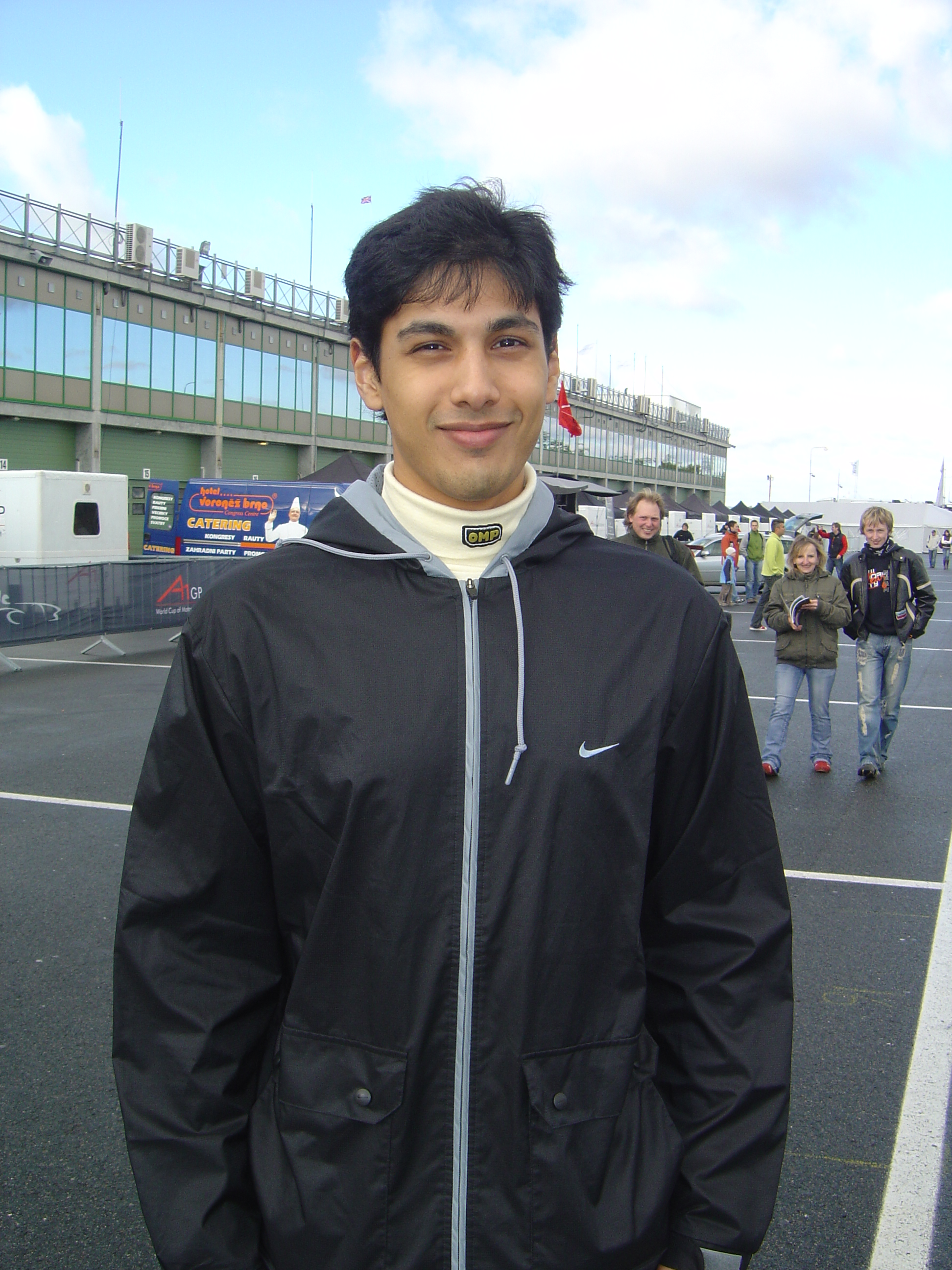
- Khan in 2007
- Nationality: (United Kingdom) British (Pakistan) Pakistani via dual nationality
- Full name: Adam Langley-Khan
- Born: 24 May 1985 (age 41) Bridlington, East Riding of Yorkshire, England

Euroseries 3000 career
- Debut season: 2008
- Current team: TP Formula
- Car number: 14
- Starts: 12
- Wins: 3
- Poles: 2
- Fastest laps: 2
- Best finish: 3rd in 2008

Previous series
- 2008 2008 2005–06- 2007–08 2005 2004–2005 2003 & 2005 2003 2002: Euroseries 3000; GP2 Asia Series; A1GP Austrian F3; British F3; German Formula 3 Formula Renault V6 Eurocup; Spanish F3

Adam Langley-Khan (born 24 May 1985) is a British racing driver of Pakistani descent.

== History ==
Khan began racing with an intensive course at the BRDC Silverstone Racing School in 2001, and jointly competed in several Junior Formula Ford races.

The following year, Khan participated in four races through a scholarship class in the BRDC Formula 3 Winter Series.

In May 2003, Eddie Jordan endorsed Khan's career when Khan was seventeen years of age for the 2003 Formula Renault V6 Eurocup. In October same year, he joined Performance Racing programme.

=== Grand Prix ===
==== 2005–06 ====
After the launching of A1 Team Pakistan, Nur Ali was the first driver to be named in the inaugural 2005–06 A1 Grand Prix season, but was replaced before the first round with Adam Khan.

In the first race at Brands Hatch, Khan qualified in seventh place and finished the sprint race in eighêth. The team had problems in the pit stop in the feature race and resulted in Khan finishing 13th. Following this, the team failed to score a point until the final race in China where Khan finished fifth. The team missed three rounds after Khan was injured in a practice crash in South Africa, although Enrico Toccacelo was drafted in as a non-scoring substitute driver for said weekend. Pakistan finished 20th in the standings with a total of ten points.

In the second edition, Khan left the team, and Ali was recalled to race in season two. Khan took a break from racing, instead concentrating on his business studies at King’s College London.

==== 2007–08 ====
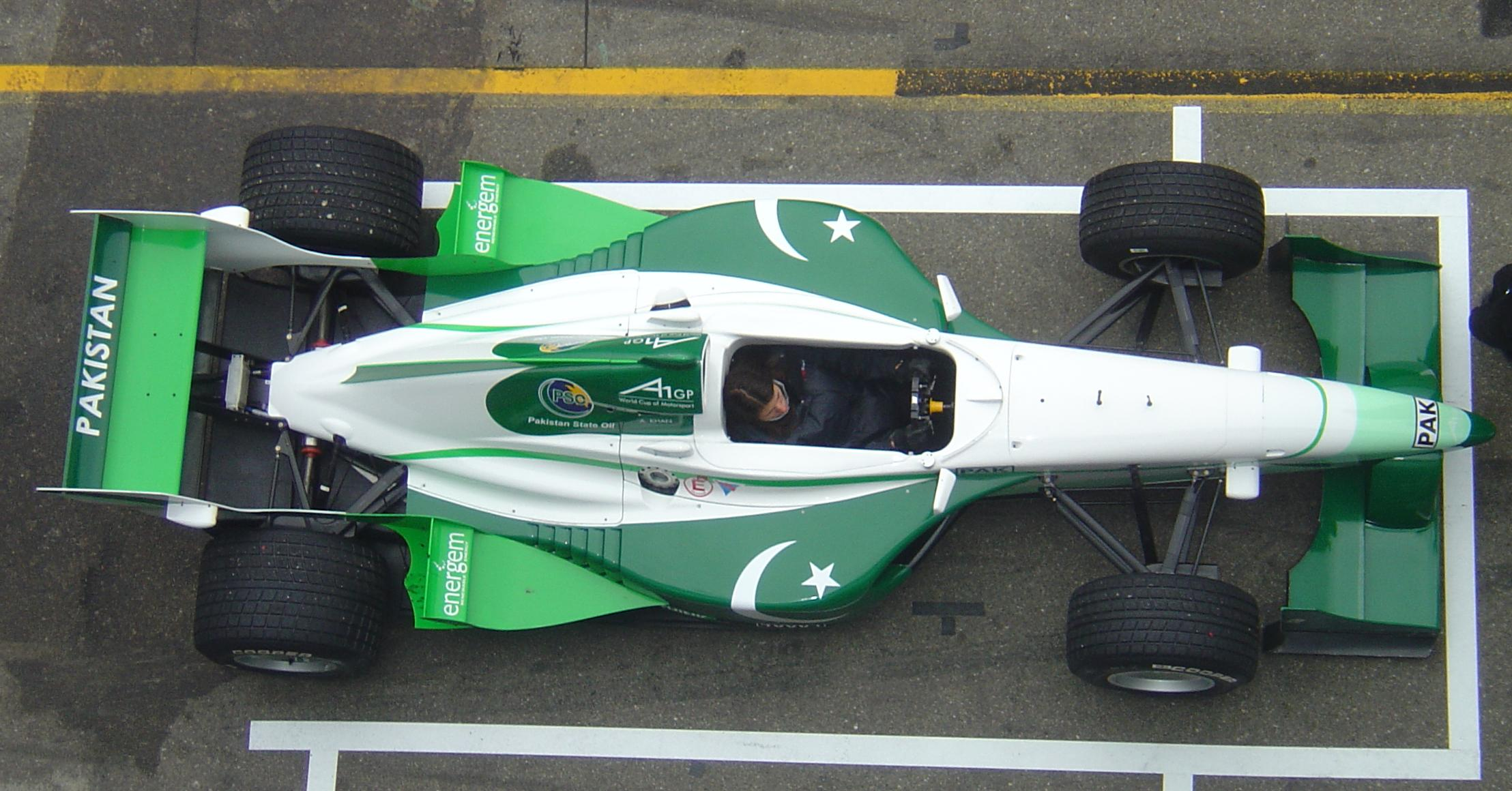
Adam Khan with A1 Team Pakistan during a pit stop in GP 2007.

Khan returned to the squad for season three. Khan's only point of the season came when he finished 10th in the sprint race in New Zealand.

==== 2008–09 ====
In August 2008, Khan prepared for the new A1GP season. On 10 September 2008, Khan was announced as both the driver and team seat holder for the 2008–09 season. Team Craft took over the running of the team. The team failed to appear at any events that season, initially due to problems with Khan fitting in the new chassis and later due to date-clashes with Khan's duties as demonstration driver for the Renault F1 Team.

=== Euroseries 3000 ===
Having competed in the Euro3000 series in 2008 finishing third, and despite missing the first four races, Khan narrowly missed out on the championship. His performances were spotted by the bosses at Renault F1 and he became their F1 test and demonstration driver in 2009 alongside Fernando Alonso and Nelson Piquet Jr.

== Personal life ==
Khan was born in Bridlington, Yorkshire to a British Pakistani family. He was appointed as an official government ambassador for motor sports in Pakistan, and in 2006 was presented with a young achievers award by the country’s president Pervez Musharraf.

== Racing record ==
=== Career summary ===
Season	Series	Team	Races	wins	Poles	Fast laps	Points	Pos.
2002	Spanish Formula Three	G-Tec	1	0	0	0	0	-
2003	Formula Renault V6 Eurocup	DAMS	10	0	0	0	4	22nd
2003	German Formula Three	Performance Racing Europe	2	0	0	0	2	23rd
2004	British Formula 3 – Scholarship Class	Alan Docking Racing	9	0	0	0	78	6th
2005	British Formula 3 – National Class	Performance Racing Europe	4	0	0	0	18	11th
2005	German Formula Three	Performance Racing Europe	2	0	0	0	1	18th
2005	Austrian Formula Three Series		7	0	0	0	40	6th
2005-06	A1 Grand Prix	A1 Team Pakistan†	14	0	0	0	10	20th (1)
2007-08	A1 Grand Prix	A1 Team Pakistan	20	0	0	0	1	20th (1)
2008	Euroseries 3000	TP Formula	12	3	3	2	55	**3rd**
2008	Italian Formula 3000	TP Formula	6	2	1	1	25	6th
2008	GP2 Asia Series	Team Arden	4	0	0	0	0	28th

- (1) = Team standings.

† At the Durban round he was injured after crash in practice sessions.

=== Complete A1 Grand Prix results ===
(key) (Races in bold indicate pole position) (Races in italics indicate fastest lap)

Year	Entrant	1	2	3	4	5	6	7	8	9	10	11	12	13	14	15	16	17	18	19	20	21	22	DC	Points
2005–06	Pakistan	GBR; SPR; 7	GBR; FEA; Ret	GER; SPR; Ret	GER; FEA; 12	POR; SPR; Ret	POR; FEA; 15	AUS; SPR; 12	AUS; FEA; 11	MYS; SPR; 13	MYS; FEA; Ret	UAE; SPR; 16	UAE; FEA; Ret	RSA; SPR	RSA; FEA	IDN; SPR	IDN; FEA	MEX; SPR	MEX; FEA	USA; SPR	USA; FEA	CHN; SPR; 12	CHN; FEA; 5	20th	10
2007–08	Pakistan	NED; SPR; 18	NED; FEA; 17	CZE; SPR; 15	CZE; FEA; 20	MYS; SPR; 17	MYS; FEA; 14	CHN; SPR; 14	CHN; FEA; 14	NZL; SPR; 10	NZL; FEA; 11	AUS; SPR; Ret	AUS; FEA; 12	RSA; SPR; 12	RSA; FEA; Ret	MEX; SPR; Ret	MEX; FEA; 18	CHN; SPR; 16	CHN; FEA; 17	GBR; SPR; 18	GBR; FEA; Ret			20th	1

=== Complete GP2 Series results ===
==== Complete GP2 Asia Series results ====
(key) (Races in bold indicate pole position) (Races in italics indicate fastest lap)

Year	Entrant	1	2	3	4	5	6	7	8	9	10	DC	Points
2008	Trust Team Arden	UAE1; FEA; 18	UAE1; SPR; 15	IND; FEA; Ret	IND; SPR; 11	MAL; FEA	MAL; SPR	BHR; FEA	BHR; SPR	UAE2; FEA	UAE2; SPR	28th	0
