= Beretta (surname) =

Beretta is an Italian surname. Notable people with the surname include:

- Antonio Beretta (1808–1891), first mayor of Milan, 1860–1867
- Bartolomeo Beretta (c. 1490 – c. 1565), founder of the Beretta arms manufacturing company
- Caterina Beretta (1839–1911), Italian ballet dancer and teacher, the director of La Scala Ballet School from 1905 to 1908
- Daniel Beretta (1946–2024), French actor
- Duilio Beretta (born 1992), Peruvian professional tennis player
- Emilio Maria Beretta (1907–1974), Swiss painter
- Fábio Beretta (born 1986), Brazilian racing driver
- Giacomo Beretta (born 1992), Italian footballer
- Gianna Beretta Molla (1922–1962), canonised as a saint in 2004
- Joanne Beretta (1933–2020), American cabaret singer
- Luciano Beretta (1928–1994), Italian lyricist
- Mario Beretta (born 1959), Italian association football manager
- Mark Beretta (born 1966), Australian media personality
- Moreno Beretta (born 1993), Italian footballer
- Olivier Beretta (born 1969), racing driver from Monaco
- Samuele Beretta (born 1990), Italian forward footballer

== See also ==
- Baretta (surname)
- Barretter (disambiguation)
- Bereta (disambiguation)
- Biretta, a type of hat
