= Et tu Brute (disambiguation) =

Et tu, Brute? (pronounced [ɛt ˈtuː ˈbruːtɛ]) is a Latin-language phrase and quote from William Shakespeare's play Julius Caesar.

Et Tu Brute or variations, may also refer to:

== Music ==
- Et tu Brute?, former name of 2001 album Box Car Racer (album) by the band Box Car Racer
- Et Tu Brute, a 2007 album by Theo Parrish
- Et Tu, Brute? (EP), a 2014 record by the Red Jumpsuit Apparatus
- "Et Tu Brute", a song by Joe Beagle
- "Et Tu Brute?", a 1995 song by CIV from the album Set Your Goals (album)
- "Et Tu, Bruté?", a 1997 song by Chris Potter from the album Unspoken (Chris Potter album)

== Film and television ==
- "Et Tu, Brute", a 1991 episode of Shark in the Park
- "Et Tu, Brute?", a 2015 episode of Empire (season 2)
- You Too Brutus, a 2015 Indian film
- "Et Tu Brutus", a chapter of the 2025 Indian film Dhurandhar

== Other uses ==
- Et tu, Brute? – The Murder of Caesar and Political Assassination, a 2006 non-fiction book by Greg Woolf
- Et tu Brute, a painting by William Holmes Sullivan, a variation on the painting The Assassination of Julius Caesar (Sullivan)

== See also ==
- Last words of Julius Caesar
- List of last words
