= Davide Rigon =

Formula and sportscar racing driver, two-time Superleague Formula champion

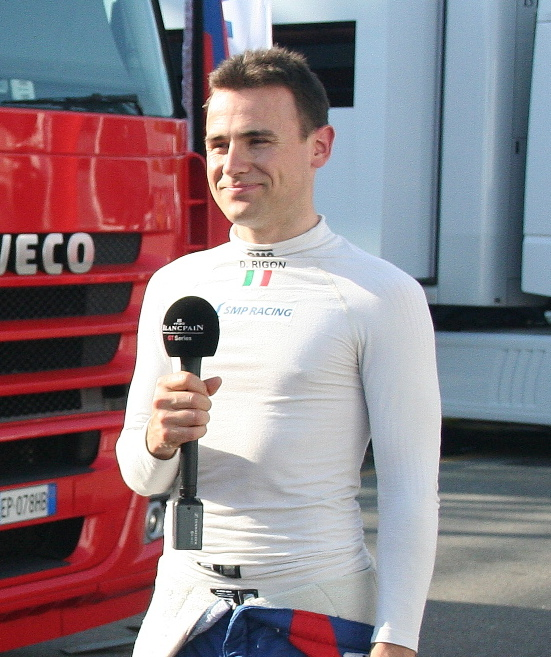
- Rigon in 2018
- Nationality: (Italy) Italian
- Born: 26 August 1986 (age 40) Thiene, Vicenza, Italy

FIA WEC - GTE Pro career
- Debut season: 2013
- Current team: AF Corse
- Categorisation: FIA Platinum
- Car number: 54
- Former teams: 8 Star Motorsport
- Starts: 87
- Wins: 7
- Poles: 7
- Fastest laps: 4
- Best finish: 2nd in 2016

Previous series
- 2009, 11 2008–09 2008–09 2008 2008 2008 2006–08 2005 2005 2005 2004, 06 2004–05 2004 2004 2003 2003: GP2 Series; Superleague Formula; GP2 Asia Series; FIA GT Championship; International Formula Master; Superstars Series; Euroseries 3000; Formula One testing World Series by Renault; Formula Azzurra; Italian F3; Formula Renault 2.0 Italia; FRenault Italia Winter Series; Formula Gloria; Formula BMW ADAC; Formula Gloria W. Trophy

Championship titles
- 2010 2008 2007 2007 2005: Superleague (Anderlecht); Superleague (B. Guoan); Euroseries 3000; Italian Formula 3000; Formula Azzurra

Davide Rigon (born 26 August 1986) is an Italian professional racing driver who is currently competing in the FIA World Endurance Championship and other selected GT races for AF Corse. He is also currently part of the Scuderia Ferrari Formula One test driver team.

== Career ==
Starting out in Formula BMW ADAC in 2003, Thiene-born Rigon progressed to the Italian Formula Renault Championship and Italian Formula Three. He won the Formula Azzurra title in 2005, and finished second in Italian Formula Three the following year.

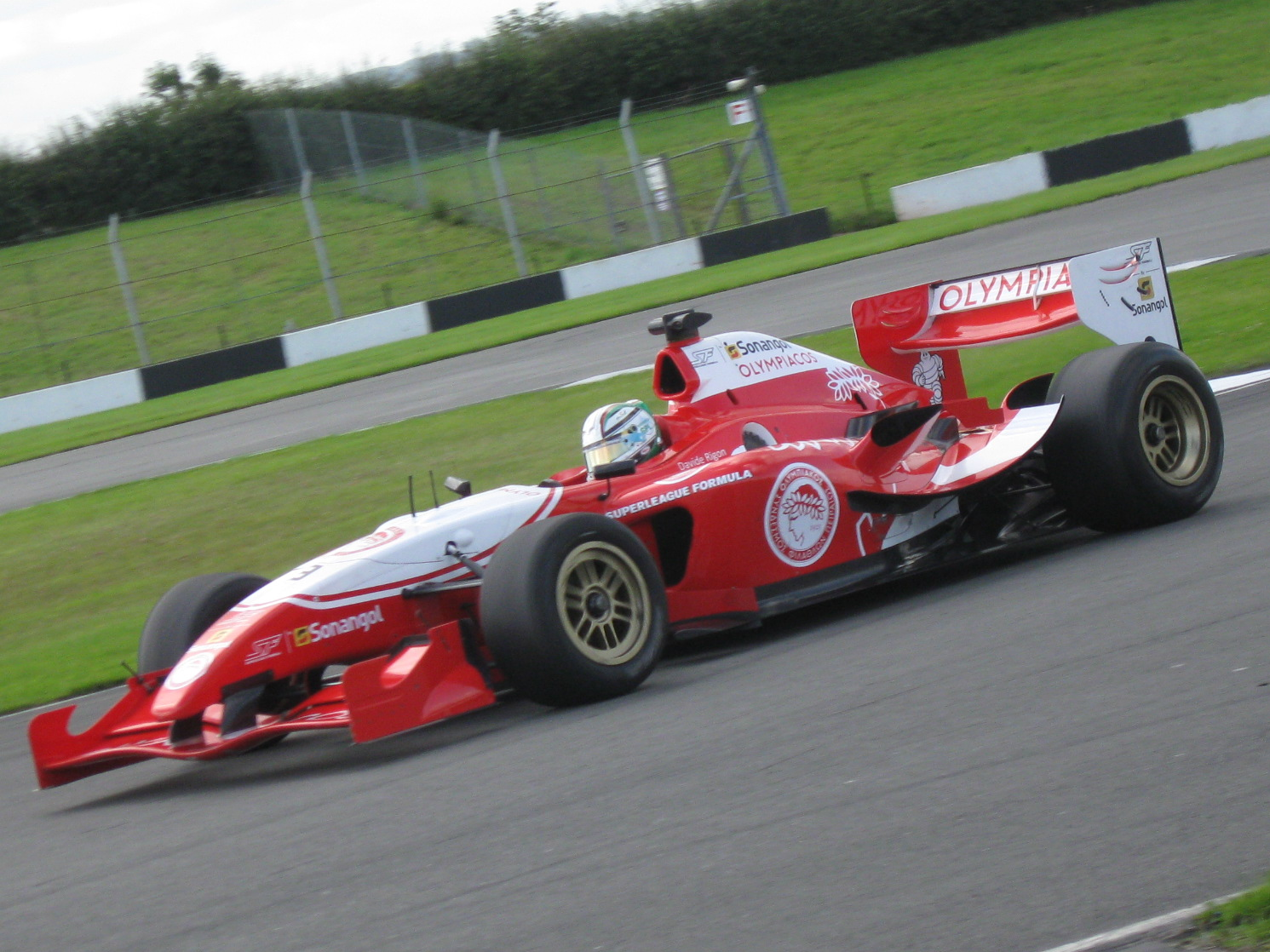
Rigon driving for Olympiacos at Donington Park in the 2009 Superleague Formula season

In 2007, Rigon won the Euroseries 3000 championship, winning three races. He also raced for Italy in the 2007–08 A1 Grand Prix season. In 2008, he competed in the GT2 class of the FIA GT Championship for BMS Scuderia Italia, and also in International Formula Master, while also racing for Beijing Guoan in the inaugural 2008 Superleague Formula season. Guoan were rated amongst the outsiders for the title, but Rigon defied that and led them to the championship, with three wins.

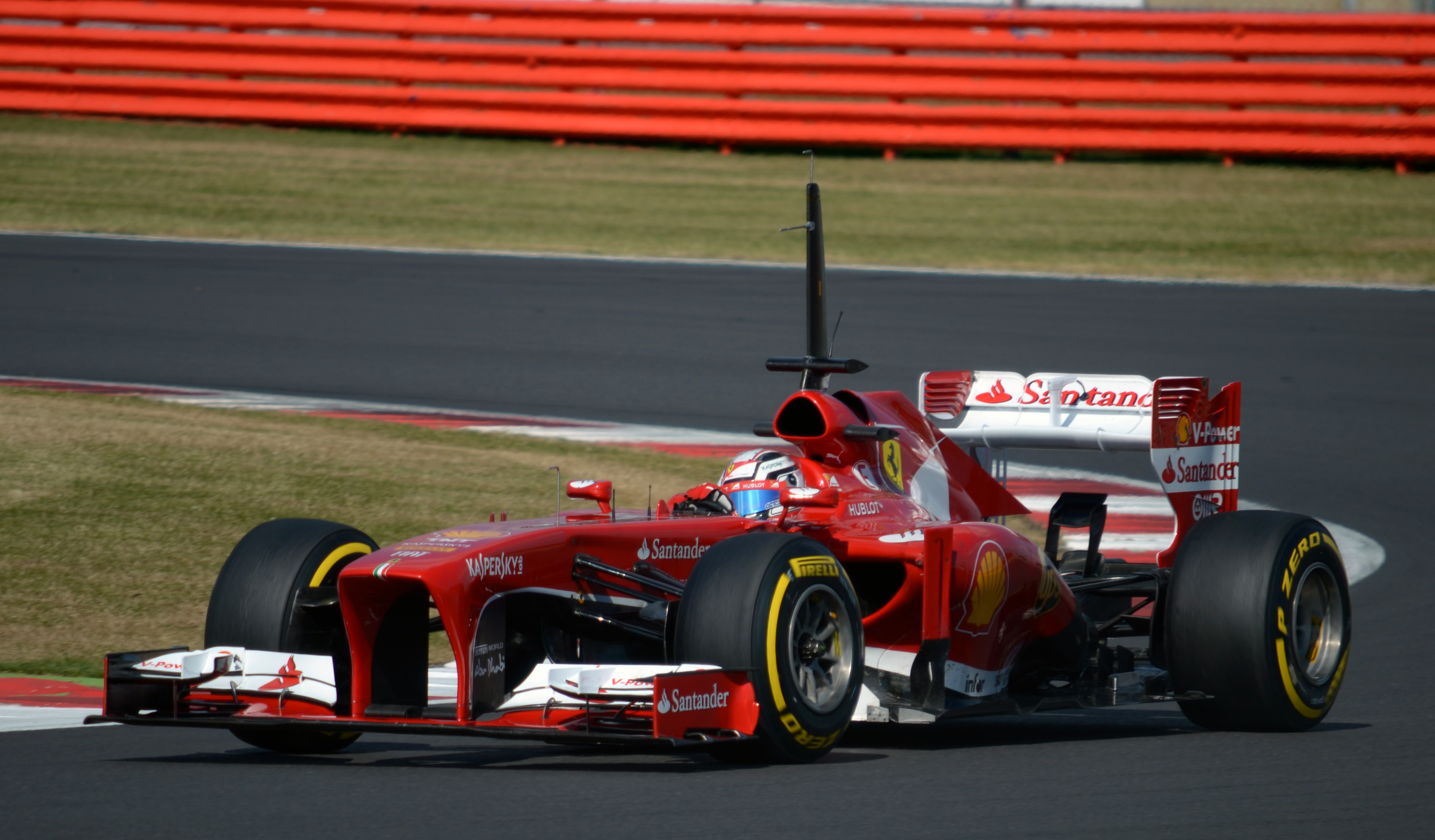
Rigon testing for Ferrari in 2013.

During the off-season, Rigon joined up with Trident Racing to compete in the fourth round of the 2008–09 GP2 Asia Series season in Qatar. He scored his first points in the series, with a seventh at the penultimate race in Bahrain. He followed that up with a third in the final race, as he finished 17th in the championship.

He continued with the team into the 2009 GP2 Series season, but was replaced after four rounds by Rodolfo González despite outpacing teammate Ricardo Teixeira all season. He did however return for the Hungarian rounds of the championship, and remained with the team for the rest of the season. He returned to Superleague Formula, but with the Olympiacos CFP team instead of Beijing Guoan. He reclaimed the championship in 2010 whilst driving for the R.S.C. Anderlecht team.

Rigon returned to the GP2 Series for the 2011 with the Coloni team. During the first round of the season, at Istanbul Park, he was involved in a crash with Julián Leal and suffered multiple fractures to his tibia and fibula. He was replaced by compatriot Kevin Ceccon, and later Luca Filippi, and was restricted to 29th in the championship as a result of his injury.

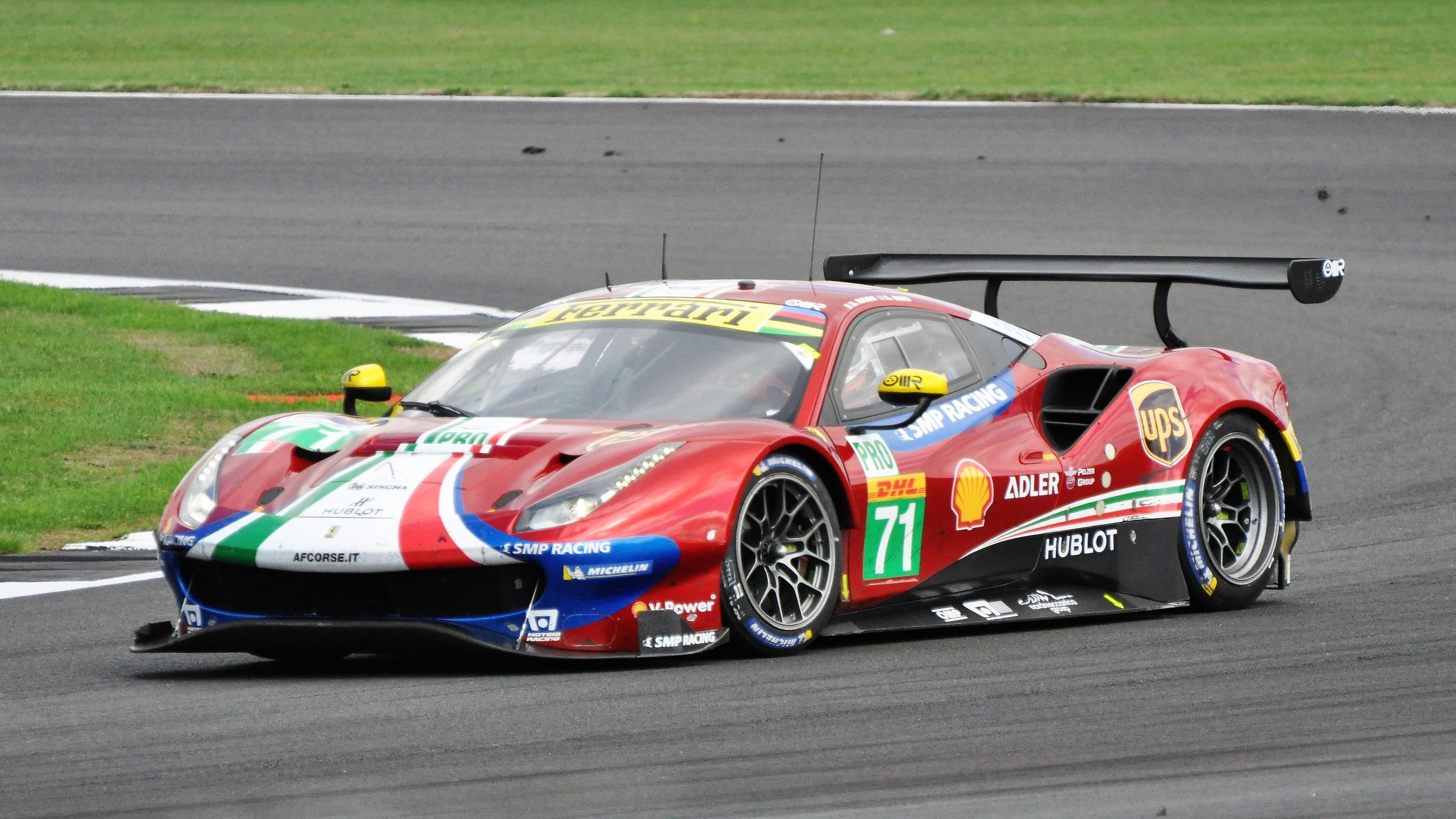
Rigon racing in the 2018 6 Hours of Silverstone.

Rigon switched to sports car racing in 2012, and joined Kessel Racing for the Blancpain Endurance Series. In the 2013 season, he won at Monza and finished fourth in the Pro Cup with teammates Daniel Zampieri and César Ramos. Also in 2013, he drove in four rounds of the FIA World Endurance Championship with 8 Star Motorsports, also in a Ferrari 458 Italia. He got a win and two second-place finishes, helping the team to win the GTE-Am class championship. Rigon also won two races out of four in the International GT Open partnering with Andrea Montermini in a Scuderia Villorba Ferrari.

Rigon drove a GTE-Pro class Ferrari F458 Italia for AF Corse full-time for the 2014 FIA World Endurance Championship.

== Racing record ==
=== Career summary ===
Season	Series	Team	Races	Wins	Poles	FLaps	Podiums	Points	Position
2003	Formula BMW ADAC	Team Lauderbach Motorsport	20	0	0	0	0	14	17th
2004	Italian Formula Three Championship	W.R.C.	9	0	0	0	0	32	11th
2005	Formula Azzura	Europa Corse	10	5	7	7	7	71	**1st**
2005	Formula Renault 2.0 Italia	BVM Minardi	14	1	0	0	3	113	6th
2005	Formula Renault 3.5 Series	Victory Engineering	4	0	0	0	0	4	26th
2006	Italian Formula 3 Championship	Corbetta Competizioni	16	4	2	6	10	111	**2nd**
2006	Euroseries 3000	Minardi by GP Racing	2	0	0	0	1	8	14th
2007	Euroseries 3000	Minardi by GP Racing	16	5	4	5	13	108	**1st**
2008	Superleague Formula	Beijing Guoan	12	3	1	2	5	413	**1st**
2008	Superstars Series	Racing4You / Ferlito Motors	3	0	0	0	1	32	6th
2008	FIA GT Championship	BMS Scuderia Italia	6	1			1	33.5	12th
2008	Euroseries 3000	TP Formula	1	0	1	0	1	9	15th
2008	International Formula Master	ADM Motorsport	2	0	0	0	0	0	29th
2009	GP2 Series	Trident Racing	18	0	0	0	0	3	22nd
2009	GP2 Asia Series	Trident Racing	6	0	0	0	1	6	17th
2009	Superleague Formula	Olympiacos CFP	6	0	1	0	1	300	6th
2010	Superleague Formula	R.S.C. Anderlecht	33	5	5	1	16	699	**1st**
2011	GP2 Series	Scuderia Coloni	2	0	0	0	0	0	29th
2011	Formula One	Scuderia Ferrari	Simulator driver						
2012	Blancpain Endurance Series - Pro	Kessel Racing	6	0	1	0	1	45	10th
2012	Formula Renault 3.5 Series	BVM Target	2	0	0	0	0	0	33rd
2012	Formula One	Scuderia Ferrari	Simulator driver						
2013	Blancpain Endurance Series - Pro	Kessel Racing	5	1	0	2	1	50	4th
2013	FIA World Endurance Championship - LMGTE Am	8 Star Motorsport	4	1	0	0	3	67	10th
2013	International GT Open	Scuderia Villorba Corse	4	2	0	1	3	26	10th
2013	Formula One	Scuderia Ferrari	Simulator driver						
2014	FIA World Endurance Championship - LMGTE Pro	AF Corse	8	0	0	1	5	94	7th
2014	24 Hours of Le Mans - LMGTE Pro	AF Corse	1	0	0	0	0	N/A	DNF
2014	United SportsCar Championship - GTD	Spirit of Race	1	0	0	0	0	16	96th
2014	Formula One	Scuderia Ferrari	Simulator driver						
2015	FIA World Endurance Championship - LMGTE Pro	AF Corse	8	0	1	1	5	123	4th
2015	24 Hours of Le Mans - LMGTE Pro	AF Corse	1	0	0	0	1	N/A	**2nd**
2015	Blancpain Endurance Series - Pro-Am	AF Corse	1	0	0	0	1	39	9th
2015	United SportsCar Championship - GTLM	Risi Competizione	1	0	0	0	0	23	26th
2015	Formula One	Scuderia Ferrari	Simulator driver						
2016	FIA World Endurance Championship - LMGTE Pro	AF Corse	9	2	2	0	5	134	**2nd**
2016	24 Hours of Le Mans - LMGTE Pro	AF Corse	1	0	0	0	0	N/A	DNF
2016	IMSA SportsCar Championship - GTLM	Risi Competizione	2	0	0	0	0	55	20th
2016	European Le Mans Series - LMGTE	AT Racing	1	0	0	0	1	15	16th
2016	Formula One	Scuderia Ferrari	Simulator driver						
2017	FIA World Endurance Championship - LMGTE Pro	AF Corse	9	2	4	0	4	139.5	4th
2017	24 Hours of Le Mans - LMGTE Pro	AF Corse	1	0	0	0	0	N/A	5th
2017	Blancpain GT Series Endurance Cup	SMP Racing	5	0	0	0	1	46	4th
2017	Intercontinental GT Challenge	SMP Racing	1	0	0	0	0	0	NC
2017	IMSA SportsCar Championship - GTD	Spirit of Race	1	0	0	0	0	9	81st
2017	Formula One	Scuderia Ferrari	Simulator driver						
2018	Blancpain GT Series Endurance Cup	SMP Racing	5	0	1	1	1	23	20th
2018	IMSA SportsCar Championship - GTLM	Risi Competizione	1	0	0	1	0	27	20th
2018	24 Hours of Le Mans - LMGTE Pro	AF Corse	1	0	0	0	0	N/A	9th
2018	ADAC GT Masters	HB Racing	4	0	0	0	0	11	30th
2018	Blancpain GT Series Asia	HubAuto Corsa	2	0	0	0	0	6	30th
2018	Blancpain GT Series Asia - Silver Cup	HubAuto Corsa	2	0	0	0	1	28	18th
2018	Formula One	Scuderia Ferrari	Simulator driver						
2018–19	FIA World Endurance Championship - LMGTE Pro	AF Corse	8	0	0	1	1	54.5	12th
2019	Blancpain GT Series Endurance Cup	SMP Racing	5	1	0	0	2	73	**2nd**
2019	Intercontinental GT Challenge	SMP Racing	1	0	0	0	0	0	NC
2019	IMSA SportsCar Championship - GTLM	Risi Competizione	1	0	0	0	1	32	23rd
2019	24 Hours of Le Mans - LMGTE Pro	AF Corse	1	0	0	0	0	N/A	DNF
2019	Formula One	Scuderia Ferrari	Simulator driver						
2019–20	FIA World Endurance Championship - LMGTE Pro	AF Corse	8	0	0	1	2	86	8th
2019–20	Asian Le Mans Series - GT	HubAuto Corsa	3	0	1	0	2	46	7th
2020	GT World Challenge Europe Endurance Cup	SMP Racing	3	0	0	0	0	0	NC
2020	Intercontinental GT Challenge	SMP Racing	1	0	0	0	0	0	NC
2020	IMSA SportsCar Championship - GTLM	Risi Competizione	1	0	0	0	0	25	16th
2020	24 Hours of Le Mans - LMGTE Pro	AF Corse	1	0	0	0	0	N/A	NC
2020	Formula One	Scuderia Ferrari	Simulator driver						
2021	GT World Challenge Europe Endurance Cup	Iron Lynx	5	0	0	1	0	27	11th
2021	Intercontinental GT Challenge	Iron Lynx	1	0	0	0	0	0	NC
2021	Asian Le Mans Series - GT	Rinaldi Racing	4	0	0	0	2	49	**3rd**
2021	IMSA SportsCar Championship - GTLM	Risi Competizione	1	0	0	1	0	308	13th
2021	Formula One	Scuderia Ferrari	Simulator driver						
2022	Asian Le Mans Series - GT	Rinaldi Racing	4	1	0	0	2	55	**3rd**
2022	IMSA SportsCar Championship - GTD Pro	Risi Competizione	4	0	1	1	2	1213	8th
2022	European Le Mans Series - LMGTE	Iron Lynx	6	1	0	0	1	63	4th
2022	GT World Challenge Europe Endurance Cup	Iron Lynx	4	1	1	0	2	68	**3rd**
2022	Intercontinental GT Challenge	Iron Lynx	1	0	0	0	1	45	6th
2022	Intercontinental GT Challenge	AF Corse - Francorchamps	2	0	0	0	1	45	6th
2022	FIA World Endurance Championship - LMGTE Pro	AF Corse	1	0	0	0	1	32	12th
2022	FIA World Endurance Championship - LMGTE Am	AF Corse	1	0	0	1	0	12	24th
2022	24 Hours of Le Mans - LMGTE Pro	AF Corse	1	0	0	0	1	N/A	**3rd**
2022	Formula One	Scuderia Ferrari	Simulator driver						
2023	FIA World Endurance Championship - LMGTE Am	AF Corse	7	1	0	0	1	91	**3rd**
2023	24 Hours of Le Mans - LMGTE Am	AF Corse	1	0	0	0	0	N/A	5th
2023	GT World Challenge Europe Endurance Cup	AF Corse - Francorchamps Motors	5	0	0	0	1	33	10th
2023	IMSA SportsCar Championship - GTD Pro	Risi Competizione	4	0	1	1	2	1192	6th
2023	European Le Mans Series - LMGTE	Kessel Racing	1	1	0	0	1	25	11th
2023	Formula One	Scuderia Ferrari	Simulator driver						
2023–24	Asian Le Mans Series - GT	AF Corse	5	0	0	0	1	32	8th
2024	FIA World Endurance Championship - LMGT3	Vista AF Corse	8	1	0	0	1	57	7th
2024	GT World Challenge Europe Endurance Cup	AF Corse - Francorchamps Motors	4	0	1	0	2	55	5th
2024	IMSA SportsCar Championship - GTD Pro	Risi Competizione	5	1	1	1	3	1540	14th
2024	European Le Mans Series - LMGT3	GR Racing	6	0	0	0	2	64	5th
2024	Gulf 12 Hours - Pro-Am	Kessel Racing	1	0	1	0	1	N/A	**3rd**
2024	Formula One	Scuderia Ferrari	Simulator driver						
2024–25	Asian Le Mans Series - GT	AF Corse	6	0	1	0	1	32	10th
2025	FIA World Endurance Championship - LMGT3	Vista AF Corse	8	0	0	0	2	54	7th
2025	IMSA SportsCar Championship - GTD Pro	DragonSpeed	5	0	1	1	2	1525	14th
2025	European Le Mans Series - LMGT3	AF Corse	6	0	0	1	0	42	9th
2025	GT World Challenge Europe Endurance Cup	Rinaldi Racing	3	0	0	0	0	0	NC
2025	Formula One	Scuderia Ferrari HP	Simulator driver						
2025–26	Asian Le Mans Series - GT	AF Corse	6	0	0	0	0	22	15th
2026	FIA World Endurance Championship - LMGT3	Vista AF Corse	8	0	0	0	0	13	22nd
2026	IMSA SportsCar Championship - GTD Pro	Risi Competizione	5	0	0	0	0	1206	12th
2026	European Le Mans Series - LMGT3	AF Corse	6	0	0	0	0	22	16th
2026	Intercontinental GT Challenge	Arise Racing GT	1	0	0	0	0	4	28th
2026	Formula One	Scuderia Ferrari HP	Simulator driver						

=== Complete Formula Renault 3.5 Series results ===
(key) (Races in bold indicate pole position) (Races in italics indicate fastest lap)

Year	Team	1	2	3	4	5	6	7	8	9	10	11	12	13	14	15	16	17	Pos	Points
2005	Victory Engineering	ZOL; 1	ZOL; 1	MON; 1	VAL; 1	VAL; 2	LMS; 1	LMS; 2	BIL; 1	BIL; 2	OSC; 1	OSC; 2	DON; 1	DON; 2	EST; 1; 16	EST; 2; 10	MNZ; 1; 8	MNZ; 2; 14	26th	4
2012	BVM Target	ALC; 1	ALC; 2	MON; 1	SPA; 1	SPA; 2	NÜR; 1	NÜR; 2	MSC; 1	MSC; 2	SIL; 1	SIL; 2	HUN; 1	HUN; 2	LEC; 1; 19	LEC; 2; 13	CAT; 1	CAT; 2	33rd	0

=== Superleague Formula results ===
==== 2008–2009 ====
(Races in bold indicate pole position) (Races in italics indicate fastest lap)

Year	Team	Operator	1		2		3		4		5		6		Position	Points
2008	Beijing Guoan	Zakspeed	DON		NÜR		ZOL		EST		VAL		JER		**1st**	**413**
2008	Beijing Guoan	Zakspeed	**1**	6	5	3	17	1	5	5	1	5	9	3	**1st**	**413**
2009	Olympiacos CFP	GU-Racing International	MAG		ZOL		DON		EST		MOZ		JAR		6th	300
2009	Olympiacos CFP	GU-Racing International	18	**2**	10	4	17	15							6th	300

==== 2009 Super Final ====
- Super Final results in 2009 did not count for points towards the main championship.

Year	Team	1	2	3	4	5	6
2009	Olympiacos CFP GU-Racing International	MAG; 6	ZOL; N/A	DON; DNQ	EST	MOZ	JAR

==== 2010 ====
Year	Team	Operator	1			2			3			4			5			6			7			8			9			10			NC			11			Position	Points
2010	R.S.C. Anderlecht	Azerti Motorsport	SIL			ASS			MAG			JAR			NÜR			ZOL			BRH			ADR			POR			ORD			BEI †			NAV			**1st**	**699**
2010	R.S.C. Anderlecht	Azerti Motorsport	9	10	X	**1**	10	1	7	3	2	10	6	X	2	12	2	2	9	1	13	2	2	**1**	8	**1**	2	9	2	5	8	3	13	**15**	C	**2**	11	4	**1st**	**699**

† Non-championship event.

=== Complete GP2 Series results ===
(key) (Races in bold indicate pole position) (Races in italics indicate fastest lap)

Year	Entrant	1	2	3	4	5	6	7	8	9	10	11	12	13	14	15	16	17	18	19	20	DC	Points
2009	Trident Racing	CAT; FEA; 17	CAT; SPR; 21†	MON; FEA; 9	MON; SPR; 7	IST; FEA; 10	IST; SPR; 8	SIL; FEA; 16	SIL; SPR; 20	NÜR; FEA	NÜR; SPR	HUN; FEA; 8	HUN; SPR; Ret	VAL; FEA; 12	VAL; SPR; 7	SPA; FEA; Ret	SPA; SPR; 5	MNZ; FEA; 9	MNZ; SPR; 8	ALG; FEA; 14	ALG; SPR; 9	22nd	3
2011	Scuderia Coloni	IST; FEA; 10	IST; SPR; Ret	CAT; FEA	CAT; SPR	MON; FEA	MON; SPR	VAL; FEA	VAL; SPR	SIL; FEA	SIL; SPR	NÜR; FEA	NÜR; SPR	HUN; FEA	HUN; SPR	SPA; FEA	SPA; SPR	MNZ; FEA	MNZ; SPR			29th	0

==== GP2 Asia Series ====
(key) (Races in bold indicate pole position) (Races in italics indicate fastest lap)

Year	Entrant	1	2	3	4	5	6	7	8	9	10	11	12	DC	Points
2008–09	Trident Racing	SHI; FEA	SHI; SPR	DUB; FEA	DUB; SPR	BHR1; FEA	BHR1; SPR	LSL; FEA; 14	LSL; SPR; 15	SEP; FEA; Ret	SEP; SPR; 13	BHR2; FEA; 7	BHR2; SPR; 3	17th	6

=== Complete GT World Challenge Europe Results ===
==== GT World Challenge Europe Endurance Cup ====
(key) (Races in bold indicate pole position; races in italics indicate fastest lap)

Year	Team	Car	Class	1	2	3	4	5	6	7	8	Pos.	Points
2012	Kessel Racing	Ferrari 458 Italia GT3	Pro	**MNZ**; 4	SIL; 11	**LEC**; 3	SPA; 6H; 40	SPA; 12H; 16	SPA; 24H; Ret	NÜR; 33	NAV; 6	10th	45
2013	Kessel Racing	Ferrari 458 Italia GT3	Pro	MNZ; 1	SIL; 6	LEC; 4	SPA; 6H; 18	SPA; 12H; 7	SPA; 24H; Ret	NÜR; 20		4th	50
2015	AF Corse	Ferrari 458 Italia GT3	Pro-Am	MNZ	SIL	LEC	SPA; 6H; 8	SPA; 12H; 10	SPA; 24H; 6	NÜR		9th	39
2017	SMP Racing	Ferrari 488 GT3	Pro	MNZ; 5	SIL; 4	LEC; 2	SPA; 6H; 51	SPA; 12H; 36	SPA; 24H; 24	CAT; Ret		4th	46
2018	SMP Racing	Ferrari 488 GT3	Pro	**MNZ**; 44	SIL; 7	LEC; 33	SPA; 6H; 22	SPA; 12H; 14	SPA; 24H; 10	CAT; 3		20th	23
2019	SMP Racing	Ferrari 488 GT3	Pro	MNZ; 23	SIL; 1	LEC; 2	SPA; 6H; 1	SPA; 12H; 1	SPA; 24H; 51	CAT; 13		2nd	73
2020	SMP Racing	Ferrari 488 GT3	Pro	IMO; 20	NÜR; 14	SPA; 6H; 14	SPA; 12H; 13	SPA; 24H; 19	LEC			NC	0
2021	Iron Lynx	Ferrari 488 GT3 Evo 2020	Pro	MNZ; 4	LEC; 4	SPA; 6H; Ret	SPA; 12H; Ret	SPA; 24H; Ret	NÜR; 38	CAT; 39		11th	27
2022	Iron Lynx	Ferrari 488 GT3 Evo 2020	Pro	IMO; 8	**LEC**; 1	SPA; 6H; 2	SPA; 12H; 4	SPA; 24H; 3	HOC; Ret	CAT		3rd	68
2023	AF Corse - Francorchamps Motors	Ferrari 296 GT3	Pro	MNZ; 14	LEC; 5	SPA; 6H; 7	SPA; 12H; 17	SPA; 24H; 11	NÜR; 14	CAT; 2		10th	33
2024	AF Corse - Francorchamps Motors	Ferrari 296 GT3	Pro	LEC; 9	SPA; 6H; 5	SPA; 12H; 4	SPA; 24H; 2	NÜR; 8	MNZ	**JED**; 3		5th	55
2025	Rinaldi Racing	Ferrari 296 GT3	Bronze	LEC; 41	MNZ; 38	SPA; 6H; 44	SPA; 12H; 49	SPA; 24H; 41	NÜR	CAT		36th	5

=== Complete FIA World Endurance Championship results ===
(key) (Races in bold indicate pole position; races in italics indicate fastest lap)

Year	Entrant	Class	Car	Engine	1	2	3	4	5	6	7	8	9	Rank	Points
2013	8 Star Motorsport	LMGTE Am	Ferrari 458 Italia GT2	Ferrari 4.5L V8	SIL	SPA	LMS	SÃO; 2	COA	FUJ; 4	SHA; 1	BHR; 2		10th	67
2014	AF Corse	LMGTE Pro	Ferrari 458 Italia GT2	Ferrari 4.5 L V8	SIL; 5	SPA; 3	LMS; Ret	COA; 7	FUJ; 2	SHA; 3	BHR; 3	SÃO; 3		7th	94
2015	AF Corse	LMGTE Pro	Ferrari 458 Italia GT2	Ferrari 4.5 L V8	SIL; 3	SPA; 7	LMS; 2	NÜR; 3	COA; 3	**FUJ**; 3	SHA; 4	BHR; 6		4th	123
2016	AF Corse	LMGTE Pro	Ferrari 488 GTE	Ferrari F154CB 3.9 L Turbo V8	**SIL**; 1	**SPA**; 1	LMS; Ret	NÜR; 2	MEX; 4	COA; 3	FUJ; 4	SHA; 5	BHR; 3	2nd	134
2017	AF Corse	LMGTE Pro	Ferrari 488 GTE	Ferrari F154CB 3.9 L Turbo V8	SIL; 5	**SPA**; 1	LMS; 4	NÜR; 11	**MEX**; 2	**COA**; 3	FUJ; 5	SHA; 6	**BHR**; 1	4th	139.5
2018–19	AF Corse	LMGTE Pro	Ferrari 488 GTE Evo	Ferrari F154CB 3.9 L Turbo V8	SPA; 3	LMS; 6	SIL; 16	FUJ; 10	SHA; 6	SEB; 6	SPA; 6	LMS; Ret		12th	54.5
2019–20	AF Corse	LMGTE Pro	Ferrari 488 GTE Evo	Ferrari F154CB 3.9 L Turbo V8	SIL; Ret	FUJ; 5	SHA; 6	BHR; 2	COA; 5	SPA; 6	LMS; NC	BHR; 3		8th	86
2022	AF Corse	LMGTE Pro	Ferrari 488 GTE Evo	Ferrari F154CB 3.9 L Turbo V8	SEB	SPA	LMS; 3	MNZ						12th	32
2022	AF Corse	LMGTE Am	Ferrari 488 GTE Evo	Ferrari F154CB 3.9 L Turbo V8					FUJ; 4	BHR				24th	12
2023	AF Corse	LMGTE Am	Ferrari 488 GTE Evo	Ferrari F154CB 3.9 L Turbo V8	SEB; 5	ALG; 4	SPA; NC	LMS; 5	MNZ; 10	FUJ; 1	BHR; 4			3rd	91
2024	Vista AF Corse	LMGT3	Ferrari 296 GT3	Ferrari F163CE 3.0 L Turbo V6	QAT; 5	IMO; 12	SPA; 6	LMS; Ret	SÃO; 15	COA; Ret	FUJ; 1	BHR; 7		7th	57
2025	Vista AF Corse	LMGT3	Ferrari 296 GT3	Ferrari F163CE 3.0 L Turbo V6	QAT; 8	IMO; 5	SPA; 3	LMS; Ret	SÃO; 11	COA; 3	FUJ; 6	BHR; Ret		7th	54
2026	Vista AF Corse	LMGT3	Ferrari 296 GT3 Evo	Ferrari F163CE 3.0 L Turbo V6	IMO; 11	SPA; 15	LMS; Ret	SÃO; 17	COA; 10	FUJ; 4	CAT; 12	MNZ; Ret		22nd	13

=== Complete 24 Hours of Le Mans results ===
Year	Team	Co-Drivers	Car	Class	Laps	Pos.	Class Pos.
2014	(Italy) AF Corse	(Germany) Pierre Kaffer (Monaco) Olivier Beretta	Ferrari 458 Italia GT2	GTE; Pro	28	DNF	DNF
2015	(Italy) AF Corse	(United Kingdom) James Calado (Monaco) Olivier Beretta	Ferrari 458 Italia GT2	GTE; Pro	332	21st	**2nd**
2016	(Italy) AF Corse	(Italy) Andrea Bertolini (United Kingdom) Sam Bird	Ferrari 488 GTE	GTE; Pro	143	DNF	DNF
2017	(Italy) AF Corse	(United Kingdom) Sam Bird (Spain) Miguel Molina	Ferrari 488 GTE	GTE; Pro	339	21st	5th
2018	(Italy) AF Corse	(United Kingdom) Sam Bird (Spain) Miguel Molina	Ferrari 488 GTE Evo	GTE; Pro	338	24th	9th
2019	(Italy) AF Corse	(United Kingdom) Sam Bird (Spain) Miguel Molina	Ferrari 488 GTE Evo	GTE; Pro	140	DNF	DNF
2020	(Italy) AF Corse	(United Kingdom) Sam Bird (Spain) Miguel Molina	Ferrari 488 GTE Evo	GTE; Pro	340	NC	NC
2022	(Italy) AF Corse	(Italy) Antonio Fuoco (Spain) Miguel Molina	Ferrari 488 GTE Evo	GTE; Pro	349	30th	**3rd**
2023	(Italy) AF Corse	(Italy) Francesco Castellacci (Switzerland) Thomas Flohr	Ferrari 488 GTE Evo	GTE; Am	312	31st	5th
2024	(Italy) Vista AF Corse	(Italy) Francesco Castellacci (Switzerland) Thomas Flohr	Ferrari 296 GT3	LMGT3	30	DNF	DNF
2025	(Italy) Vista AF Corse	(Italy) Francesco Castellacci (Switzerland) Thomas Flohr	Ferrari 296 GT3	LMGT3	192	DNF	DNF
2026	(Italy) Vista AF Corse	(Italy) Francesco Castellacci (Switzerland) Thomas Flohr	Ferrari 296 GT3 Evo	LMGT3	110	DNF	DNF

=== Complete IMSA SportsCar Championship results ===
(key) (Races in bold indicate pole position; races in italics indicate fastest lap)

Year	Entrant	Class	Chassis	Engine	1	2	3	4	5	6	7	8	9	10	11	12	Rank	Points	Ref
2014	Spirit of Race	GTD	Ferrari 458 Italia GT3	Ferrari F136 4.5 L V8	DAY; 18	SEB	LGA	DET	WGL	MOS	IMS	ELK	VIR	COA	PET		96th	16	
2015	Risi Competizione	GTLM	Ferrari 458 Italia GT2	Ferrari F136 4.5 L V8	DAY; 9	SEB	LBH	LGA	WGL	MOS	LIM	ELK	VIR	COA	PET		26th	23	
2016	Risi Competizione	GTLM	Ferrari 488 GTE	Ferrari F154CB 3.9 L Turbo V8	DAY; 6	SEB; 4	LBH	LGA	WGL	MOS	LIM	ELK	VIR	COA	PET		20th	55	
2017	Spirit of Race	GTD	Ferrari 488 GT3	Ferrari F154CB 3.9 L Turbo V8	**DAY**; 23	SEB	LBH	COA	DET	WGL	MOS	LIM	ELK	VIR	LGA	PET	81st	9	
2018	Risi Competizione	GTLM	Ferrari 488 GTE	Ferrari F154CB 3.9 L Turbo V8	DAY; 5	SEB	LBH	MDO	WGL	MOS	LIM	ELK	VIR	LGA	PET		20th	26	
2019	Risi Competizione	GTLM	Ferrari 488 GTE	Ferrari F154CB 3.9 L Turbo V8	DAY; 2	SEB	LBH	MDO	WGL	MOS	LIM	ELK	VIR	LGA	PET		23rd	32	
2020	Risi Competizione	GTLM	Ferrari 488 GTE	Ferrari F154CB 3.9 L Turbo V8	DAY; 6	DAY	SEB	ELK	VIR	ATL	MDO	CLT	PET	LGA	SEB		16th	25	
2021	Risi Competizione	GTLM	Ferrari 488 GTE	Ferrari F154CB 3.9 L Turbo V8	DAY; 4	SEB	DET	WGL	WGL	LIM	ELK	LGA	LBH	VIR	PET		13th	308	
2022	Risi Competizione	GTD Pro	Ferrari 488 GT3 Evo 2020	Ferrari F154CB 3.9 L Turbo V8	DAY; 2	**SEB**; 9	LBH	LGA	WGL; 2	MOS	LIM	ELK	VIR	PET; 7			8th	1213	
2023	Risi Competizione	GTD Pro	Ferrari 296 GT3	Ferrari F163CE 3.0 L Turbo V6	DAY; 10	SEB; 6	LBH	LGA	**WGL**; 2	MOS	LIM	ELK	VIR	IMS	PET; 3		6th	1192	
2024	Risi Competizione	GTD Pro	Ferrari 296 GT3	Ferrari F163CE 3.0 L Turbo V6	DAY; 1	SEB; 2	LGA	DET	**WGL**; 11	MOS	ELK	VIR	IMS; 9	PET; 2			14th	1540	
2025	DragonSpeed	GTD Pro	Ferrari 296 GT3	Ferrari F163CE 3.0 L Turbo V6	DAY; 6	**SEB**; 4	LGA	DET	WGL; 3	MOS	ELK	VIR	IMS; 2	PET; 7			14th	1525	
2026	Risi Competizione	GTD Pro	Ferrari 296 GT3 Evo	Ferrari F163CE 3.0 L Turbo V6	DAY; 15	SEB; 13	LGA	DET	WGL; 5	MOS	ELK; 8	VIR	IMS	PET; 5			12th	1206	

=== Complete Bathurst 12 Hour results ===
Year	Team	Co-Drivers	Car	Class	Laps	Pos.	Class Pos.
2015	(Italy) AF Corse	(Italy) Michele Rugolo (Australia) Steve Wyatt	Ferrari 458 Italia GT3	AA	163	DNF	DNF
2026	(Australia) Arise Racing GT	(Australia) Jaxon Evans (Brazil) Daniel Serra	Ferrari 296 GT3	Pro	262	9th	7th

=== Complete European Le Mans Series results ===
(key) (Races in bold indicate pole position; results in italics indicate fastest lap)

Year	Entrant	Class	Chassis	Engine	1	2	3	4	5	6	Rank	Points
2016	AT Racing	LMGTE	Ferrari 458 Italia GT2	Ferrari 4.5 L V8	SIL	IMO; 3	RBR	LEC	SPA	EST	16th	15
2022	Iron Lynx	LMGTE	Ferrari 488 GTE Evo	Ferrari F154CB 3.9 L Turbo V8	LEC; 7	IMO; 5	MNZ; 1	CAT; 6	SPA; 9	ALG; 4	4th	63
2023	Kessel Racing	LMGTE	Ferrari 488 GTE Evo	Ferrari F154CB 3.9 L Turbo V8	CAT	LEC	ARA; 1	SPA	ALG	ALG	11th	25
2024	GR Racing	LMGT3	Ferrari 296 GT3	Ferrari F163CE 3.0 L Turbo V6	CAT; 2	LEC; 5	IMO; 7	SPA; 2	MUG; 8	ALG; 6	5th	64
2025	AF Corse	LMGT3	Ferrari 296 GT3	Ferrari F163CE 3.0 L Turbo V6	CAT; 5	LEC; 5	IMO; 4	SPA; 6	SIL; 11	ALG; 9	9th	42
2026	AF Corse	LMGT3	Ferrari 296 GT3 Evo	Ferrari F163CE 3.0 L Turbo V6	CAT; 9	LEC; DSQ	IMO; 6	SPA; 4	SIL; Ret	ALG; 6	16th	22

=== Complete Asian Le Mans Series results ===
(key) (Races in bold indicate pole position; results in italics indicate fastest lap)

Year	Entrant	Class	Chassis	Engine	1	2	3	4	5	6	Rank	Points
2019–20	HubAuto Corsa	GT	Ferrari 488 GT3	Ferrari F154CB 3.9 L Turbo V8	**SHA**; 6	**BEN**; 2	CHA; 2	SEP			7th	46
2021	Rinaldi Racing	GT	Ferrari 488 GT3	Ferrari F154CB 3.9 L Turbo V8	DUB; 1; 8	DUB; 2; 2	ABU; 1; 4	ABU; 2; 3			3rd	49
2022	Rinaldi Racing	GT	Ferrari 488 GT3 Evo 2020	Ferrari F154CB 3.9 L Turbo V8	DUB; 1; 2	DUB; 2; 1	ABU; 1; 7	ABU; 2; 6			3rd	57
2023–24	AF Corse	GT	Ferrari 296 GT3	Ferrari F163CE 3.0 L Turbo V6	SEP; 1; 10	SEP; 2 Ret	DUB; 3	ABU; 1; 7	ABU; 2; 5		8th	32
2024-25	AF Corse	GT	Ferrari 296 GT3	Ferrari F163CE 3.0 L Turbo V6	SEP; 1; 4	**SEP**; **2**; 3	DUB; 1; 16	DUB; 2; 19	ABU; 1; 9	ABU; 2; 14	10th	32
2025–26	AF Corse	GT	Ferrari 296 GT3	Ferrari F163CE 3.0 L Turbo V6	SEP; 1; 14	SEP; 2; 4	DUB; 1 Ret	DUB; 2; 14	ABU; 1; 17	ABU; 2; 5	15th	22

Sporting positions
Preceded by Inaugural	Formula Azzurra; Champion; 2005	Succeeded by Giuseppe Termine
Preceded by Giacomo Ricci	Euroseries 3000; Champion; 2007	Succeeded by Nicolas Prost
Preceded by Giacomo Ricci	Italian F3000; Champion; 2007	Succeeded by Omar Leal
Preceded by Inaugural	Superleague Formula; Champion (Beijing Guoan); 2008	Succeeded by Adrián Vallés (Liverpool F.C.)
Preceded by Adrián Vallés (Liverpool F.C.)	Superleague Formula; Champion (R.S.C. Anderlecht); 2010	Succeeded by John Martin (Australia)
Preceded by Nick Tandy; Tommy Milner (GTLM)	Michelin Endurance Cup; GTD Pro Champion; 2022; With: Daniel Serra	Succeeded by Jules Gounon; Daniel Juncadella
