= Baretta (surname) =

Baretta is a surname. Notable people with the surname include:

- Angelo Baretta (died 1539), Italian Roman Catholic Bishop of Capri
- Bill Barretta (born 1964), American puppeteer and producer
- John Baretta (born 1955), former Canadian soccer goalkeeper

== See also ==
- Baretta (disambiguation)
- Beretta (surname)
- Anthony Vincenzo "Tony" Baretta, fictional detective in the TV series Baretta
