= Bereta =

Bereta may refer to:

- Joe Bereta of Barats and Bereta, American sketch comedy group
- Georges Bereta, French football player

== See also ==
- Baretta (disambiguation)
- Barretter (disambiguation)
- Beretta (disambiguation)
- Biretta
