= Barratt =

Barratt may refer to:

== People ==
- Barratt (name), a surname and given name

== Brands and companies ==
- Barratt (confectionery), a brand owned by Monkhill Confectionery
- Barratt Redrow, a house builder
- Barratts Shoes, a brand of shoe stores in the UK and Ireland

== Music ==
- Barratt (album), the only solo album released by Norman Barratt

== See also ==
- Barrett (disambiguation)
- Barat (disambiguation)
- Bharat (disambiguation)
