= Kalash l'Afro =

French Tunisian rapper

Kalash l'Afro (born in Berre-l'Étang, Bouches-du-Rhône in 1979) is a French rapper of Tunisian origin.

== Part of Berreta ==
Berreta
- Origin: France
- Genres: Rap
- Years active: 1999-2005
- Label: Baraka Muzik
- Past members: Kalash l'Afro; Sheir; Skwal; Belek

Born to Tunisian parents who had immigrated to France, he started releasing his materials through tapes starting 1997. In 2009 he formed the rap band Berreta with Sheir, Skwal and Belek and through the label Baraka Muzik, released a number of albums as Berreta: L'estanque en déplacement (1999), Rimes 2 zone (2004) and L'encre est dans le chargeur (2005).

== Solo career ==
Starting 2005, Kalash l'Afro started working on his own, initially releasing the mixtape Ghettoven (2006). His official album Cracheur de flammes in 2007 saw collaborations from Keny Arkana, Soprano, Le Rat Luciano, Mystik, Lino, Lil' Saï and members of Berreta. The album charted at #91 on SNEP French Albums Chart. He followed it with the maxi Légitime (2008) again a charting release.

== Discography ==
As part of Berreta

Year	Title	Description	Peak positions
Year	Title	Description	FR
1999	L'estanque en déplacement	Album	–
2004	Rimes 2 zone	Album	–
2005	L'encre est dans le chargeur	Album	–

As Kalash l'Afrop

Year	Title	Description	Peak positions
Year	Title	Description	FR
2006	Ghettoven	Mixtape	–
2007	Cracheur de flammes	Studio album	91
2008	Légitime	Maxi single	125
2010	Que du seum	Mixtape	–
2011	Plus de seum	Street album	–
2015	Terre brûlée		–
