= Juan Ramón Zapata =

Spanish racing driver (born 1974)

- Nationality: (Spain) Spanish
- Born: 18 June 1974 (age 52) Moncada (Spain)

Juan Ramón Zapata (born 18 June 1974 in Moncada) is a Spanish racing driver. He has competed in such series as Euroseries 3000 and the Spanish Formula Three Championship.
