= Optimism BH =

American advertising agency

- Company type: Private
- Founded: December 2012; 13 years ago
- Headquarters: San Francisco, CA, United States
- Key people: Jamie Barrett, Matt Hofherr
- Number of employees: 45+
- Website: optimismbh.com

Optimism BH (formerly Barrett Hofherr) is an American advertising agency headquartered in San Francisco, California that was founded in December 2012.

The agency is led by Jamie Barrett, who serves as Chief Creative Officer, and Matt Hofherr, Chief Strategy Officer. Optimism BH works with clients including Chime, DoorDash, Airbnb, Habit Burger & Grill and Sutter Health, eBay, 2K Games, Salesforce, and Google.

== History ==
Before founding Optimism BH (Barrett Hofherr), Jamie Barrett held creative leadership roles at prominent agencies such as Wieden + Kennedy, Goodby Silverstein & Partners, Fallon, and Chiat Day. He has been named Adweek's National Creative Director of the Year and was listed in Creativity magazine's Top 50 Creatives for three consecutive years, 2006, 2007 and 2008.

Matt Hofherr previously co-founded the agency MUH-TAY-ZIK | HOF-FER (M/H) in 2010, which was named Advertising Age's Small Agency of the Year in 2014.

The company has received multiple honors from Advertising Age's Small Agency Awards, including the title of West Coast Small Agency of the Year in 2018.

In 2024, the company acquired the creative agency Funworks. That same year, the agency launched Double E Analytics, a strategic analytics company aimed at enhancing brand measurement. As part of this launch, they introduced the Brand Momentum Score, a proprietary, scientifically validated tool designed to evaluate how effectively a brand captures attention, creates emotional impact, and drives cultural relevance. The score provides insights into a brand's trajectory and offers guidance on building momentum for growth.
