= Joe Beagle =

English songwriter

Joseph Beagle, also known as singer-songwriter Joey Parratt, is an English award-winning songwriter with various TV, radio and live performances to his name. He was founder member of The Flying Brix, No-one, Champion the Underdog, The (original) Beagles, Awful Racket, Cute Baby Monster and My Mate's Band all of which played almost exclusively his own original songs.

In 1979, as founder member of The Flying Brix, along with John Ashton, David Bradbury, Mark Hamilton, Gary Taylor and his brother Andy Barratt, he recorded, produced and released "Black Colours" a limited edition 7-inch 33 rpm vinyl DIY EP with 9 original songs, distributed by Rough Trade Records and played by John Peel (of BBC, Radio One). One of the songs, "Uniform (I Don't Wanna Be Different)", was later featured on a compilation CD commemorating the era, MESSTHETICS No. 104 CD: 'D.I.Y.' and indie postpunk from the South Wales and the Z-Block scene: 1977–1981 (part 1).

Rowlands replaced Hamilton and then the band split in 1981 and Rowlands, Ashton, Bradbury and Taylor went on to form 'Fourplay'. Joe stayed with the name of The Flying Brix.

His next offering recorded at Rockfield Studios featured a completely new line-up and was described by Allan Jones (editor) of Melody Maker as "Too bizarre by half, this kind of thing, for the conservative legions who make up today's predictable pop public, but definitely refreshing and bravely unorthodox."

During 1982, he courted publicity while trying to promote a local heavy metal band, for his friends. His antics were frequently reported by South Wales Echo columnist Rod Liddle. He was invited to host an art exhibition of his illustrated lyrics in The Gallery, 4–22 October 1982, St Donat's Castle, Llantwit Major, South Wales and perform a live concert of his own songs in the Tythe Barn there on Saturday 6 October 1982.

One of over 1,500 entries, his song "Home is where the heartbreak is" won 1st prize and £1,000 when he performed it live for the judges Melvyn Bragg, Jake Thackray and Victoria Wood at the finals of the 1st British National Songsearch competition held at The Brewery Arts Centre, as a climax to the Kendal Folk Festival on Saturday 24 August 1985.

Melvyn Bragg said it "provided a bleak epic of life on the wrong side of the underprivileged". Gary Price said "The lyrics – in common with many of Joey Parratt's other songs – mix a healthy cynicism with compassion and humour". while Mick Tems derided some of the other songs on the album to praise it saying "The song grabs you places other songs can't reach".

Red Dragon Radio DJ and Cardiff Post Columnist, Gary Price wrote "To say Joey Parratt has a way with words is to use a cliché which ill-defines a superb lyrical talent", adding "I have rarely read a book of lyrics and been so overwhelmed by the wit and humour whilst at the same time touched by the obvious humanity of the author".

A video of his song "Oh No, Here Come the Goodguys, Again!" was included in the music documentary Barry Island Rock and featured on S4C and Channel 4.

The BBC produced a video of him performing a solo version of his song "Et Tu Brute", which was broadcast nationwide. He performed his songs "Oh No, Here Come the Goodguys, Again!", "Nightrider", and "Fergie's Song" with his band No-one on BBC TV.

His song "Up & Alive", was recorded by his band Champion The Underdog, and included on the anti-racist compilation Now That's More Like It, and he performed his song "I've Turned Into a Fish!" live on Channel 4, with his band The Beagles, featuring Roger Whitham on bass. Videos of six of his songs were also later featured on the "Beaglemania" CD-ROM. The Beagles also did the 20 gigs in a day fundraiser for Nottingham Mencap and had a 3-month residency at The Filly & Firkin, Nottingham playing nothing but his original songs. The Beagles became Awful Racket (to avoid confusion with an Eagles covers band) and played around Nottingham including at The Green Festival.

He was a founder member of Nottingham Songwriters International. He designed their website and helped arrange bi-monthly showcase concerts.

Beagle formed the original acoustic duo with bassist Roger Whitham, Cute Baby Monster, in February 2004, whose first concert was at The Third Annual Belvoir Castle Folk Festival on Saturday 17 May 2008.

One of his songs, "Tea" was adopted by The Tea Appreciation Society for use on their MySpace page in 2008 and later released as a download on iTunes and Amazon in 2009.
