= Barretter =

Barretter may refer to:

- Hot wire barretter, an early form of radio demodulator
- Iron-hydrogen resistor or barretter, a hydrogen-filled glass bulb in which an iron wire is located
- Liquid barretter, an alternative term for electrolytic detector

== See also ==
- Baretta (disambiguation)
- Bereta (disambiguation)
- Beretta
- Biretta
