= Fábio Beretta =

Brazilian racing driver

Fábio Beretta Rossi, Jr.
- Nationality: (Brazil) Brazilian
- Born: April 18, 1986 (age 40) São Paulo (Brazil)

Euroseries 3000 career
- Debut season: 2008
- Current team: ELK Motorsport
- Car number: 4

Previous series
- 2004 2005 2006-07 2008: Brazilian Formula Ford 1800; Brazilian Formula Renault 2.0; South American Formula 3 Euroseries 3000

Fábio Beretta Rossi, Jr. (born April 18, 1986) is a racing driver from Brazil.

Beretta began his racing career in 2004 in his domestic Formula Ford 1800 series, finishing 6th in the standings. The following season he moved up to the Brazilian Formula Renault championship with Dragão Motorsport, taking a single podium finish to end the year 13th overall.

In 2006, Beretta moved up to the South American Formula 3 championship with Dragão, taking a podium place at Buenos Aires on his way to seventh place in the championship, with team-mate Luiz Razia winning the title. He stayed in the series for the 2007 season, but switched teams to Bassani Racing. During the year, he twice finished on the podium to claim 11th place in the final standings.

For 2008, Beretta moved to Europe to race in the Euroseries 3000 championship, teaming up with Nicolas Prost and Luiz Razia at ELK Motorsport. In the Italian Formula 3000 standings, he finished the season in ninth place, whilst in the main Euroseries, he finished seventh in the standings.

== Career results ==
Season	Series	Team	Races	Wins	Poles	F/Laps	Podiums	Points	Position
2004	Brazilian Formula Ford 1800	?	?	?	?	?	?	?	6th
2005	Brazilian Formula Renault	Dragão Motorsport	14	0	0	0	1	44	13th
2006	South American Formula 3	Dragão Motorsport	16	0	0	0	1	36	7th
2007	South American Formula 3	Bassani Racing	16	0	0	0	2	20	11th
2008	Euroseries 3000	ELK Motorsport	9	0	0	0	0	17	7th
2008	Italian Formula 3000	ELK Motorsport	8	0	0	0	0	15	9th
