= TP Formula =

(Italy) TP Formula
- Founded: ?
- Team principal(s): Luciano Traini; Gianluca Pomozzi
- Former series: Auto GP; Italian Formula Three Championship; Formula Abarth

TP Formula is an auto racing team based in Italy.
