= GP2 Asia Series =

Former Single-Seater Racing Championship

- Category: Formula cars
- Region: Asia
- Inaugural season: 2008
- Folded: 2011
- Drivers: 34
- Teams: 13
- Constructors: Dallara
- Engine suppliers: Mecachrome
- Tyre suppliers: Pirelli
- Last Drivers' champion: (France) Romain Grosjean
- Last Teams' champion: (France) DAMS
- Official website: gp2series.com

The GP2 Asia Series was a form of open wheel motor racing as a result of a spin-off from the GP2 Series.

== History ==
The series was officially announced during the weekend of the 2007 Monaco GP2 Series round. GP2 series organiser Bruno Michel commented that "It is of great importance that the GP2 Asia Series maintains a strong and viable link to Formula One. Our inclusion as the support races on the programme of Asian Grands Prix in 2008 is an essential key in this new venture".

The first season ran during the main GP2 series off season, January–April, with five two-race meetings. It ran alongside the new Speedcar Series, and the events in Malaysia and Bahrain acted as support races for the Formula One championship.

In effort to promote motor racing in Asia, each team is encouraged to have at least one driver whose passport does not come from Western Europe or the Americas (North and South). For the avoidance of doubt, Turkey and Russia are not included in the list of "European" countries.

However, in the 2008 season, four of the thirteen teams opted to field two non-Asian drivers with the agreement that one of their two drivers would be a "ghost driver" and receive no prize money for competing in the series.

On July 2011, GP2 CEO Bruno Michel announced that the GP2 Asia Series would be merged with the European series after the 2011 season.

== Race weekend ==
On Friday, drivers had a 30-minute free practice session and a 30-minute qualifying session. The qualifying session decided the grid order for Saturday's race which had a length of 180 kilometres. During Saturday's race, each driver had to make a pit stop in which at least two tyres have to be changed. On Sunday there was a sprint race of 80 kilometres. The grid was decided by the Saturday result with top 8 being reversed, so the driver who finished 8th on Saturday started from pole position and the winner started from 8th place.

=== Point system ===
The one who drove the pole position to Saturday's races got two points.

Fastest lap: 1 point in each race. Driver recording fastest lap has to drive 90% of race laps. The driver must also start the race from his allocated grid position and finish in the top ten of the race to be eligible for the fastest lap point. With this points system, the most points anyone can score in one round is 20 by claiming pole position, winning both races with the fastest lap in each race.

Point system for Feature Race
1st	2nd	3rd	4th	5th	6th	7th	8th	Pole	FL
10	8	6	5	4	3	2	1	2	1

Point system for Sprint Race
1st	2nd	3rd	4th	5th	6th	FL
6	5	4	3	2	1	1

== Chassis ==
From 2008 until 2010, the category used the GP2/05 chassis, produced by the Italian company Dallara, changing the chassis in 2011 to the GP2/11. Both chassis were produced in carbon fiber and were also used by the European GP2 Series. Both cars were powered by the same mechanical package: The French Mecachrome V8108 4.0 V8 engine, generating 620 hp (456 kW), coupled to a six-speed manual Hewland transmission. The cars had tires from Bridgestone (2008 to 2010) and Pirelli (2011).

== Champions ==
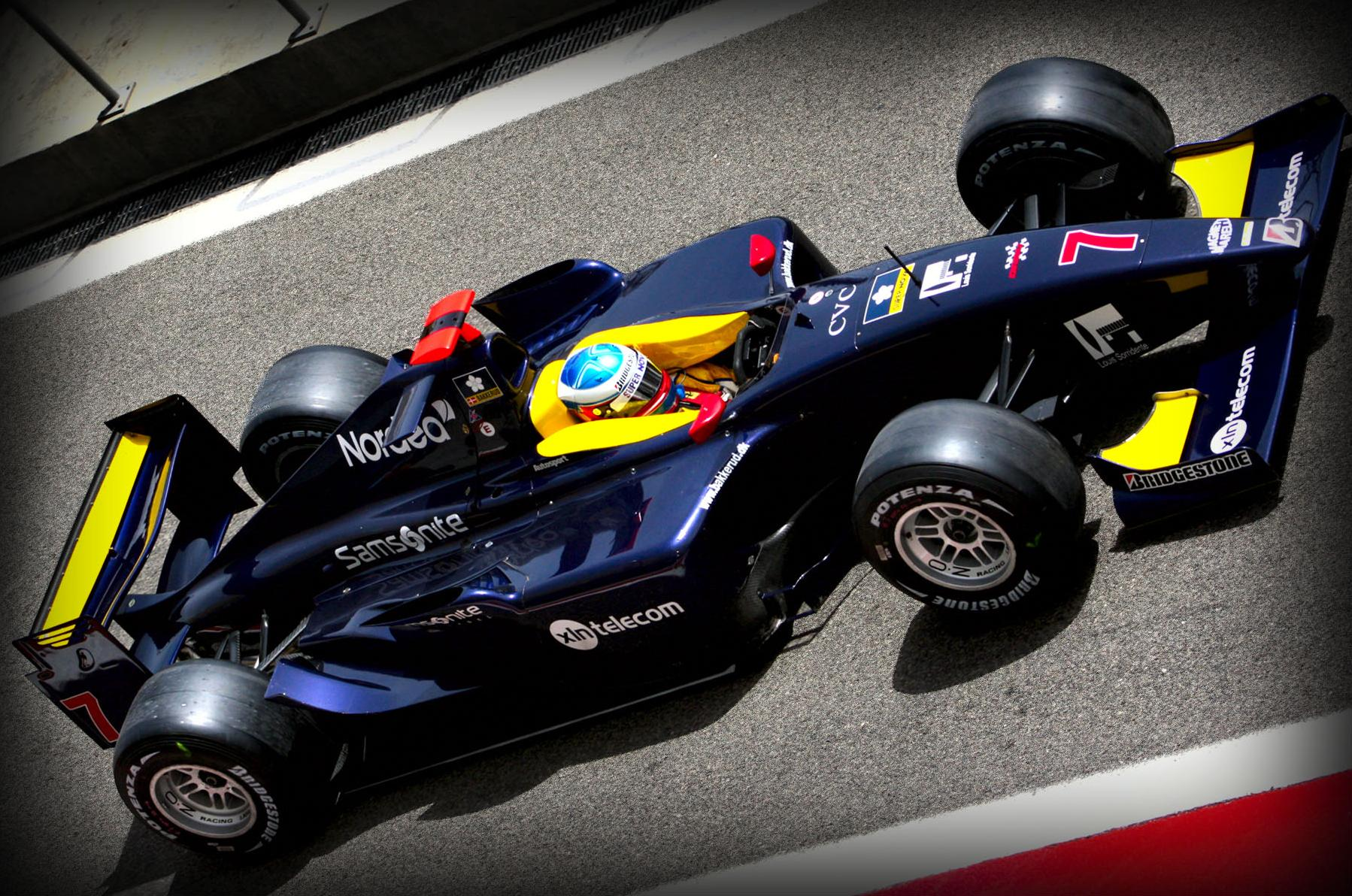
Christian Bakkerud driving for Super Nova at the 2008 Bahrain GP2 Asia Series round.

=== Drivers ===
Season	Driver	Team	Poles	Wins	Podiums	Fastest laps	Points	Clinched	Margin	Ref
2008	(France) Romain Grosjean	(France) ART Grand Prix	4	4	4	4	61	2008 Bahrain Sprint Race	24	
2008–09	(Japan) Kamui Kobayashi	(France) DAMS	2	2	4	3	56	2009 2nd Bahrain Feature Race	20	
2009–10	(Italy) Davide Valsecchi	(United Kingdom) iSport International	1	3	6	4	56	2010 Bahrain Feature Race	27	
2011	(France) Romain Grosjean	(France) DAMS	2	1	2	2	24	2011 Imola Sprint Race	6	

=== Teams ===
Season	Team	Poles	Wins	Podiums	Fastest laps	Points	Clinched	Margin	Ref
2008	(France) ART Grand Prix	4	4	4	4	61	2008 2nd UAE Feature Race	11	
2008–09	(France) DAMS	3	2	8	6	92	2009 2nd Bahrain Sprint Race	33	
2009–10	(United Kingdom) iSport International	1	4	7	4	73	2010 Bahrain Sprint Race	36	
2011	(France) DAMS	2	1	2	2	25	2011 Imola Sprint Race	3	

== See also ==
- List of GP2 Asia Series drivers
- GP2 Series
- GP3 Series
- Formula One
- Formula 3000
- Formula Three
- Formula Two
