= List of GP3 Series drivers =

This is a list of GP3 Series drivers who have made at least one race start in the GP3 Series.

== By name ==
Key
Symbol	Meaning
*	Driver has competed in the GP2 Series / FIA Formula 2 Championship
~	Driver competed in the last Formula One race (the 2026 Spanish Grand Prix)
^	Driver has competed in Formula One but not the last race

Name	License	Seasons	Championship titles	Races	Starts	Poles	Wins	Podiums	Fastest Laps	Points
Daniel Abt*	Germany	2012	0	16	16	1 (Note: Pole achieved during qualifying.)	2	7	0	149.5
Jack Aitken^	United Kingdom	2016–2017	0	34	33	2 (Note: All poles achieved during qualifying.)	2	13	3	289
Alexander Albon~	Thailand	2016	0	18	18	3 (Note: All poles achieved during qualifying.)	4	7	4	177
Mikhail Aleshin*	Russia	2010	0	2	2	0	0	0	0	0
Giuliano Alesi*	France	2016–2018	0	52	48	1 (Note: Pole scored as a result of the reverse grid in the second race.)	4	8	2	200
Riccardo Agostini	Italy	2014	0	16	16	0	0	0	0	18
Zoël Amberg*	Switzerland	2011	0	16	16	0	0	0	0	0
Zaid Ashkanani	Kuwait	2015	0	18	18	0	0	0	0	0
Gabriel Aubry	France	2018	0	18	18	0	0	0	0	5
Luciano Bacheta	United Kingdom	2011	0	12	12	0	0	0	0	4
Sebastian Balthasar	Germany	2014	0	10	8	0	0	0	0	0
Bruno Baptista	Brazil	2017	0	16	15	0	0	0	0	3
Marco Barba	Spain	2010	0	2	2	0	0	0	0	0
David Beckmann	Germany	2018	0	18	18	3 (Note: 2 poles achieved during qualifying, and 1 pole scored as a result of the reverse grid in the second race.)	3	4	0	137
Michele Beretta	Italy	2015	0	6	6	0	0	0	0	0
Emil Bernstorff*	United Kingdom	2014–2015	0	36	36	0	3	12	2	328
Dorian Boccolacci*	France	2017–2018	0	26	25	3 (Note: All poles scored as a result of the reverse grid in the second race.)	2	4	0	151
Amaury Bonduel	France	2015	0	2	2	0	0	0	0	0
Mirko Bortolotti	Italy	2010	0	16	16	1 (Note: Pole scored as a result of the reverse grid in the second race.)	0	1	0	16
Aleksander Bosak	Poland	2015	0	18	18	1 (Note: Pole scored as a result of the reverse grid in the second race.)	0	0	0	4
Ralph Boschung*	Switzerland	2015–2016	0	30	29	2 (Note: All poles scored as a result of the reverse grid in the second race.)	1	2	1	76
Valtteri Bottas^	Finland	2011	1 (2011)	16	16	1 (Note: Pole achieved during qualifying.)	4	7	3	62
Alex Brundle	United Kingdom	2012	0	16	16	0	0	1	0	19
John Bryant-Meisner	Sweden	2014	0	4	4	0	0	0	0	0
William Buller	United Kingdom	2012	0	16	16	0	1	1	0	20
James Calado*	United Kingdom	2011	0	16	16	2 (Note: 1 pole achieved during qualifying, and 1 pole scored as a result of the reverse grid in the second race.)	1	6	2	55
Andrea Caldarelli	Italy	2011	0	4	4	0	0	1	2	20
Tatiana Calderón*	Colombia	2016–2018	0	52	51	0	0	0	0	20
Victor Carbone	Brazil	2014	0	8	8	0	0	0	0	0
Kevin Ceccon*	Italy	2012, 2014–2015	0	42	40	1 (Note: Pole scored as a result of the reverse grid in the second race.)	2	4	2	153
Alfonso Celis Jr.	Mexico	2014–2015	0	34	34	0	0	1	0	26
Gabriel Chaves	Colombia	2011	0	16	16	0	0	0	0	8
Michael Christensen	Denmark	2010–2011	0	32	32	0	0	2	1	19
Stefano Coletti*	Monaco	2010	0	14	14	0	0	2	0	18
Leonardo Cordeiro	Brazil	2010–2011	0	32	32	0	0	0	0	1
Juan Manuel Correa*	Italy; United States (Note: Originally ran under an Italian licence, but later switched to an American one.)	2017–2018	0	26	25	2 (Note: All poles scored as a result of the reverse grid in the second race.)	0	0	1	42
Robert Cregan	Ireland	2012–2013	0	18	17	0	0	0	0	0
Ryan Cullen	United Kingdom	2013–2014	0	32	32	0	0	0	0	0
Conor Daly*	United States	2011–2013	0	48	48	1 (Note: Pole achieved during qualifying.)	2	11	1	242
Jehan Daruvala*	India	2018	0	2	2	0	0	0	1	0
Roman de Beer	South Africa	2014	0	10	10	0	0	0	1	8
Nyck de Vries^	Netherlands	2016	0	18	18	1 (Note: Pole achieved during qualifying.)	1	5	2	133
Devlin DeFrancesco	Canada	2018	0	14	12	0	0	0	0	0
Jake Dennis	United Kingdom	2016	0	18	18	0	2	5	1	149
Tom Dillmann*	France	2011	0	14	14	1 (Note: Pole achieved during qualifying.)	0	1	0	15
Tio Ellinas*	Cyprus	2012–2013	0	32	32	2 (Note: 1 pole achieved during qualifying, and 1 pole scored as a result of the reverse grid in the second race.)	3	5	4	213
Jimmy Eriksson*	Sweden	2013–2015	0	52	52	3 (Note: 2 poles achieved during qualifying, and 1 pole scored as a result of the reverse grid in the second race.)	3	8	1	252
Mitch Evans*	New Zealand	2011–2012	1 (2012)	32	32	8 (Note: 6 poles achieved during qualifying, and 2 poles scored as a result of the reverse grid in the second race.)	4	8	4	180.5
Julien Falchero	France	2017–2018	0	30	29	1 (Note: Pole scored as a result of the reverse grid in the second race.)	0	0	0	16
António Félix da Costa	Portugal	2010–2012	0	36	36	1 (Note: Pole achieved during qualifying.)	4	7	5	151
Sacha Fenestraz	France	2018	0	4	4	0	0	0	0	0
Santino Ferrucci*	United States	2016	0	24	24	0	0	1	0	39
Jannes Fittje	Germany	2018	0	10	10	0	0	0	0	0
Adderly Fong	Hong Kong	2013–2015	0	36	36	0	0	0	0	2
Alex Fontana	Switzerland	2011–2015	0	58	58	1 (Note: Pole scored as a result of the reverse grid in the second race.)	0	3	2	86.5
Lucas Foresti	Brazil	2010	0	10	10	0	0	1	0	7
Nirei Fukuzumi*	Japan	2016–2017	0	34	32	2 (Note: All poles achieved during qualifying.)	2	9	2	225
David Fumanelli	Italy	2012–2013	0	30	28	1 (Note: Pole scored as a result of the reverse grid in the second race.)	0	1	0	53
Antonio Fuoco*	Italy	2015–2016	0	26	26	4 (Note: All poles scored as a result of the reverse grid in the second race.)	2	10	1	245
Fabio Gamberini	United Kingdom	2012	0	2	2	0	0	0	0	1
Luca Ghiotto*	Italy	2014–2015	0	22	22	6 (Note: All poles achieved during qualifying.)	5	9	9	174
Vittorio Ghirelli*	Italy	2010–2011	0	30	28	0	0	0	0	0
Mitchell Gilbert	Australia	2014–2015	0	28	26	0	0	0	1	1
Samin Gómez	Venezuela	2013, 2015	0	22	22	0	0	0	0	0
Richard Gonda	Slovakia	2016	0	6	6	0	0	0	0	0
Felipe Guimarães	Brazil	2010	0	16	16	0	0	1	0	9
Esteban Gutiérrez^	Mexico	2010	1 (2010)	16	16	3 (Note: All poles achieved during qualifying.)	5	9	6	88
Jack Harvey	United Kingdom	2013	0	16	16	0	2	3	1	114
Rio Haryanto^	Indonesia	2010–2011	0	32	32	1 (Note: Pole scored as a result of the reverse grid in the second race.)	3	7	1	58
Tobias Hegewald	Germany	2010	0	16	16	0	0	0	0	6
Christopher Höher	Austria	2014–2015	0	4	4	0	0	0	0	0
Anthoine Hubert*	France	2017–2018	1 (2018)	34	33	2 (Note: All poles achieved during qualifying.)	2	15	7	337
Jake Hughes*	United Kingdom	2016	0	34	34	3 (Note: 1 pole achieved during qualifying, and 2 poles scored as a result of the reverse grid in the second race.)	3	5	3	175
Christophe Hurni	Switzerland	2011	0	2	2	0	0	0	0	0
Thomas Hylkema	Netherlands	2011	0	12	12	0	0	0	0	0
Raoul Hyman	South Africa	2017	0	16	15	2 (Note: All poles scored as a result of the reverse grid in the second race.)	1	1	1	27
Callum Ilott*	United Kingdom	2018	0	18	18	2 (Note: 1 pole achieved during qualifying, and 1 pole scored as a result of the reverse grid in the second race.)	2	7	2	167
Matevos Isaakyan*	Russia	2015–2016	0	22	22	1 (Note: Pole scored as a result of the reverse grid in the second race.)	0	0	0	19
James Jakes*	United Kingdom	2010	0	12	12	1 (Note: Pole scored as a result of the reverse grid in the second race.)	0	3	0	21
Artur Janosz	Poland	2015–2016	0	36	36	0	0	0	0	23
Carmen Jordá	Spain	2012–2014	0	44	42	0	0	0	0	0
Kevin Jörg	Switzerland	2016–2017	0	34	33	0	0	1	0	54
Daniel Juncadella	Spain	2010	0	10	10	1 (Note: Pole scored as a result of the reverse grid in the second race.)	0	1	0	10
Niko Kari*	Finland	2016–2017	0	32	31	0	1	2	0	69
Marvin Kirchhöfer*	Germany	2014–2015	0	36	34	3 (Note: All poles achieved during qualifying.)	6	15	4	361
Tamás Pál Kiss	Hungary	2011–2012	0	32	32	2 (Note: All poles scored as a result of the reverse grid in the second race.)	1	2	0	49
Jakub Klášterka	Czech Republic	2012	0	4	4	0	0	0	0	0
Kevin Korjus	Estonia	2013	0	16	16	2 (Note: 1 pole achieved during qualifying, and 1 pole scored as a result of the reverse grid in the second race.)	0	4	1	107
Patrick Kujala	Finland	2013–2014	0	34	34	1 (Note: Pole scored as a result of the reverse grid in the second race.)	0	0	0	27
Daniil Kvyat^	Russia	2013	1 (2013)	16	16	2 (Note: All poles achieved during qualifying.)	3	5	4	168
Simo Laaksonen	Finland	2018	0	18	18	0	0	1	0	36
Matias Laine	Finland	2011–2012	0	32	32	0	1	4	0	111
Charles Leclerc~	Monaco	2016	1 (2016)	18	18	4 (Note: All poles achieved during qualifying.)	3	8	4	202
Eric Lichtenstein	Argentina	2013	0	10	10	0	0	0	0	0
Kang Ling	China	2014	0	2	2	0	0	0	0	0
Alessio Lorandi*	Italy	2016–2018	0	28	27	1 (Note: Pole scored as a result of the reverse grid in the second race.)	1	5	0	134
Ivan Lukashevich	Russia	2010–2011	0	32	32	0	0	0	0	0
Christian Lundgaard*	Denmark	2018	0	2	2	0	0	0	0	0
Alex Lynn*	United Kingdom	2014	1 (2014)	18	18	3 (Note: 2 poles achieved during qualifying, and 1 pole scored as a result of the reverse grid in the second race.)	3	8	3	207
Fabiano Machado	Brazil	2012	0	16	14	0	0	0	0	0
Arjun Maini*	India	2016–2017	0	28	27	2 (Note: All poles scored as a result of the reverse grid in the second race.)	1	3	1	122
Callum MacLeod	United Kingdom	2011	0	8	8	0	0	0	0	3
Daniel Mancinelli	Italy	2011	0	4	4	0	0	0	0	0
Brandon Maïsano	France	2015	0	2	2	0	0	0	0	0
Jann Mardenborough*	United Kingdom	2014–2015	0	32	32	1 (Note: Pole scored as a result of the reverse grid in the second race.)	1	4	2	135
Nelson Mason	Canada	2014	0	18	17	0	0	0	0	0
Nikolay Martsenko	Russia	2014	0	4	3	0	0	0	0	0
Joey Mawson	Australia	2018	0	18	18	2 (Note: All poles scored as a result of the reverse grid in the second race.)	0	2	1	38
Nikita Mazepin^	Russia	2018	0	18	18	1 (Note: Pole achieved during qualifying.)	4	8	5	198
Melville McKee	United Kingdom	2013	0	14	14	0	1	1	2	31
Nigel Melker*	Netherlands	2010–2011	0	32	32	4 (Note: 2 poles achieved during qualifying, and 2 poles scored as a result of the reverse grid in the second race.)	1	5	2	43
Diego Menchaca	Mexico	2018	0	18	18	0	0	0	0	3
Roberto Merhi^	Spain	2010	0	12	12	0	0	3	1	26
Miki Monrás	Spain	2010	0	16	16	0	0	2	0	17
Daniel Morad	Canada	2010–2011	0	22	20	0	1	1	1	15
Seb Morris	United Kingdom	2015	0	18	18	0	0	0	0	6
Nico Müller	Switzerland	2010–2011	0	32	32	1 (Note: Pole achieved during qualifying.)	3	7	2	89
Denis Nagulin	Russia	2014	0	2	2	0	0	0	0	0
Akash Nandy	Malaysia	2016	0	18	18	0	0	0	0	0
Josef Newgarden	United States	2010	0	16	16	1 (Note: Pole achieved during qualifying.)	0	0	0	8
Patric Niederhauser*	Switzerland	2012–2014	0	50	50	3 (Note: All poles scored as a result of the reverse grid in the second race.)	4	8	2	196
Pedro Nunes	Brazil	2010–2011	0	28	28	0	0	0	0	4
Oliver Oakes	United Kingdom	2010	0	16	16	0	0	0	0	0
Esteban Ocon~	France	2015	1 (2015)	18	18	3 (Note: All poles achieved during qualifying.)	1	14	5	253
Will Palmer	United Kingdom	2018	0	2	2	0	0	0	0	0
Álex Palou*	Spain	2015–2016	0	36	36	1 (Note: Pole scored as a result of the reverse grid in the second race.)	1	2	1	73
Matt Parry	United Kingdom	2015–2016	0	36	36	0	1	5	0	149
Pedro Piquet*	Brazil	2018	0	18	18	0	2	4	0	106
Vicky Piria	Italy	2012	0	16	16	0	0	0	0	0
Jim Pla	France	2010	0	2	2	0	0	0	0	0
Alice Powell	United Kingdom	2012	0	18	18	0	0	0	0	1
Leonardo Pulcini	Italy	2017–2018	0	34	33	2 (Note: All poles achieved during qualifying.)	2	6	3	176
Adrian Quaife-Hobbs*	United Kingdom	2010–2011	0	32	31	2 (Note: All poles achieved during qualifying.)	1	3	3	46
Mahaveer Raghunathan*	India	2016	0	2	2	0	0	0	0	0
Facu Regalia*	Argentina	2012–2013	0	20	20	1 (Note: Pole achieved during qualifying.)	1	6	2	138
Patrick Reiterer	Italy	2010	0	4	4	0	0	0	0	0
Ethan Ringel	United States	2012	0	16	16	0	0	0	0	0
Alexander Rossi^	United States	2010	0	16	16	2 (Note: All poles scored as a result of the reverse grid in the second race.)	2	5	1	38
George Russell~	United Kingdom	2017	1 (2017)	16	14	4 (Note: All poles achieved during qualifying.)	4	7	5	220
Luís Sá Silva	Macau	2013–2014	0	24	24	1 (Note: Pole scored as a result of the reverse grid in the second race.)	0	0	0	4
Carlos Sainz Jr.~	Spain	2013	0	16	16	1 (Note: Pole achieved during qualifying.)	0	2	1	66
Kotaro Sakurai	Japan; Philippines (Note: Originally ran under a Japanese licence, but later switched to a Filipino one.)	2012	0	6	6	0	0	0	0	0
Pablo Sánchez López	Mexico	2010	0	16	16	0	0	0	0	0
Steijn Schothorst	Netherlands	2016	0	34	33	0	0	0	0	44
Doru Sechelariu	Romania	2010	0	16	16	0	0	0	0	0
Marcos Siebert	Argentina	2017	0	16	15	0	0	0	0	13
Alexander Sims	United Kingdom	2011, 2013	0	24	24	2 (Note: All poles scored as a result of the reverse grid in the second race.)	2	8	3	111
Dean Smith	United Kingdom	2010–2011	0	30	30	1 (Note: Pole scored as a result of the reverse grid in the second race.)	0	3	0	42
Antonio Spavone	Italy	2012	0	8	8	0	0	0	0	0
Richie Stanaway*	New Zealand	2011, 2014	0	22	22	2 (Note: 1 pole achieved during qualifying, and 1 pole scored as a result of the reverse grid in the second race.)	3	6	0	132
Marlon Stöckinger*	Philippines	2011–2012	0	32	31	1 (Note: Pole scored as a result of the reverse grid in the second race.)	1	2	2	55
Dean Stoneman*	United Kingdom	2013–2014	0	20	20	1 (Note: Pole achieved during qualifying.)	5	7	1	183
Dominic Storey	New Zealand	2011	0	4	4	0	0	0	0	0
Sandy Stuvik	Thailand	2015–2016	0	36	36	0	0	0	0	16
Dmitry Suranovich	Russia	2012	0	16	16	0	0	0	0	0
Adrien Tambay	France	2010	0	4	4	0	1	1	0	6
Ivan Taranov	Russia	2014	0	2	2	0	0	0	0	0
Konstantin Tereshchenko	Russia	2014–2016	0	26	24	1 (Note: Pole scored as a result of the reverse grid in the second race.)	0	0	0	8
Dan Ticktum*	United Kingdom	2017	0	6	5	0	0	1	0	34
Simon Trummer*	Switzerland	2010–2011	0	30	30	1 (Note: Pole scored as a result of the reverse grid in the second race.)	0	0	0	13
Óscar Tunjo	Colombia	2015–2016	0	12	11	1 (Note: Pole scored as a result of the reverse grid in the second race.)	1	2	1	35
Mathéo Tuscher	Switzerland	2014–2015	0	30	30	2 (Note: All poles scored as a result of the reverse grid in the second race.)	0	1	1	51
Ryan Tveter*	United States	2017–2018	0	34	33	2 (Note: All poles scored as a result of the reverse grid in the second race.)	0	5	0	147
Santiago Urrutia	Uruguay	2014	0	18	18	0	0	0	0	0
Aaro Vainio	Finland	2011–2013	0	46	46	3 (Note: All poles achieved during qualifying.)	3	8	1	212
Renger van der Zande	Netherlands	2010	0	16	16	0	0	1	0	6
Pål Varhaug*	Norway	2010, 2014–2015	0	52	52	0	1	1	1	27
Matthieu Vaxivière	France	2017	0	4	4	0	0	0	0	0
Giovanni Venturini	Italy	2012–2013	0	26	26	2 (Note: All poles scored as a result of the reverse grid in the second race.)	1	3	0	57
Jean-Éric Vergne^	France	2010	0	4	4	0	0	0	0	9
Richard Verschoor	Netherlands	2018	0	8	8	1 (Note: Pole scored as a result of the reverse grid in the second race.)	0	1	0	30
Beitske Visser	Netherlands	2014–2015	0	4	4	0	0	0	0	0
Robert Vișoiu*	Romania	2012–2014	0	50	50	3 (Note: All poles scored as a result of the reverse grid in the second race.)	2	4	0	91
John Wartique	Belgium	2012	0	10	10	0	0	0	0	0
Josh Webster	United Kingdom	2013	0	16	16	0	0	0	0	0
Robert Wickens	Canada	2010	0	16	16	1 (Note: Pole achieved during qualifying.)	3	7	3	71
Lewis Williamson	United Kingdom	2011–2013	0	38	37	2 (Note: 1 pole achieved during qualifying, and 1 pole scored as a result of the reverse grid in the second race.)	1	4	1	88
Nick Yelloly*	United Kingdom	2011, 2013–2014	0	50	50	1 (Note: Pole scored as a result of the reverse grid in the second race.)	1	9	1	241
Dino Zamparelli	United Kingdom	2013–2014	0	34	33	2 (Note: All poles scored as a result of the reverse grid in the second race.)	0	6	1	138
Maxim Zimin	Russia	2011	0	16	15	0	0	0	0	0
Emanuele Zonzini	San Marino	2013	0	16	16	0	0	0	0	0

== By racing license ==
License	Total Drivers	Champions	Championships	First driver(s)	Last driver(s)
Argentina	3	0	0	Facu Regalia (2012 Silverstone GP3 Series round)	Marcos Siebert (2017 Yas Marina GP3 Series round)
Australia	2	0	0	Mitchell Gilbert (2014 Catalunya GP3 Series round)	Joey Mawson (2018 Yas Marina GP3 Series round)
Austria	1	0	0	Christopher Höher (2014 Hungaroring GP3 Series round)	Christopher Höher (2015 Silverstone GP3 Series round)
Belgium	1	0	0	John Wartique (2012 Catalunya GP3 Series round)	John Wartique (2012 Monza GP3 Series round)
Brazil	8	0	0	Leonardo Cordeiro, Lucas Foresti; Felipe Guimarães, Pedro Nunes (2010 Catalunya GP3 Series round)	Pedro Piquet (2018 Yas Marina GP3 Series round)
Canada	4	0	0	Robert Wickens, Daniel Morad (2010 Catalunya GP3 Series round)	Devlin DeFrancesco (2018 Yas Marina GP3 Series round)
China	1	0	0	Kang Ling (2014 Yas Marina GP3 Series round)	Kang Ling (2014 Yas Marina GP3 Series round)
Colombia	3	0	0	Gabriel Chaves (2011 Istanbul Park GP3 Series round)	Tatiana Calderón (2018 Yas Marina GP3 Series round)
Cyprus	1	0	0	Tio Ellinas (2012 Catalunya GP3 Series round)	Tio Ellinas (2013 Yas Marina GP3 Series round)
Czech Republic	1	0	0	Jakub Klášterka (2012 Catalunya GP3 Series round)	Jakub Klášterka (2012 Monaco GP3 Series round)
Denmark	2	0	0	Michael Christensen (2010 Catalunya GP3 Series round)	Christian Lundgaard (2018 Le Castellet GP3 Series round)
Estonia	1	0	0	Kevin Korjus (2013 Catalunya GP3 Series round)	Kevin Korjus (2013 Yas Marina GP3 Series round)
Finland	6	1 (Bottas)	1 (2011)	Valtteri Bottas, Matias Laine, Aaro Vainio (2011 Istanbul Park GP3 Series round)	Simo Laaksonen (2018 Yas Marina GP3 Series round)
France	14	2 (Ocon, Hubert)	2 (2015, 2018)	Jean-Éric Vergne (2010 Catalunya GP3 Series round)	Giuliano Alesi, Gabriel Aubry, Anthoine Hubert (2018 Yas Marina GP3 Series round)
Germany	6	0	0	Tobias Hegewald (2010 Catalunya GP3 Series round)	David Beckmann, Jannes Fittje (2018 Yas Marina GP3 Series round)
Hong Kong	1	0	0	Adderly Fong (2013 Catalunya GP3 Series round)	Adderly Fong (2015 Yas Marina GP3 Series round)
Hungary	1	0	0	Tamás Pál Kiss (2011 Istanbul Park GP3 Series round)	Tamás Pál Kiss (2012 Monza GP3 Series round)
India	3	0	0	Mahaveer Raghunathan (2016 Catalunya GP3 Series round)	Jehan Daruvala (2018 Yas Marina GP3 Series round)
Indonesia	1	0	0	Rio Haryanto (2010 Catalunya GP3 Series round)	Rio Haryanto (2011 Monza GP3 Series round)
Ireland	1	0	0	Robert Cregan (2012 Catalunya GP3 Series round)	Robert Cregan (2013 Yas Marina GP3 Series round)
Italy	16	0	0	Mirko Bortolotti, Vittorio Ghirelli, Patrick Reiterer (2010 Catalunya GP3 Series round)	Leonardo Pulcini (2018 Yas Marina GP3 Series round)
Japan	2	0	0	Kotaro Sakurai (2012 Catalunya GP3 Series round)	Nirei Fukuzumi (2017 Yas Marina GP3 Series round)
Kuwait	1	0	0	Zaid Ashkanani (2015 Catalunya GP3 Series round)	Zaid Ashkanani (2015 Yas Marina GP3 Series round)
Macau	1	0	0	Luís Sá Silva (2013 Catalunya GP3 Series round)	Luís Sá Silva (2014 Yas Marina GP3 Series round)
Malaysia	1	0	0	Akash Nandy (2016 Catalunya GP3 Series round)	Akash Nandy (2016 Yas Marina GP3 Series round)
Mexico	4	1 (Gutiérrez)	1 (2010)	Esteban Gutiérrez, Pablo Sánchez López (2010 Catalunya GP3 Series round)	Diego Menchaca (2018 Yas Marina GP3 Series round)
Monaco	2	1 (Leclerc)	1 (2016)	Stefano Coletti (2010 Istanbul Park GP3 Series round)	Charles Leclerc (2016 Yas Marina GP3 Series round)
Netherlands	7	0	0	Nigel Melker, Renger van der Zande (2010 Catalunya GP3 Series round)	Richard Verschoor (2018 Yas Marina GP3 Series round)
New Zealand	3	1 (Evans)	1 (2012)	Mitch Evans, Dominic Storey (2011 Istanbul Park GP3 Series round)	Richie Stanaway (2014 Yas Marina GP3 Series round)
Norway	1	0	0	Pål Varhaug (2010 Catalunya GP3 Series round)	Pål Varhaug (2015 Yas Marina GP3 Series round)
Philippines	2	0	0	Marlon Stöckinger (2011 Istanbul Park GP3 Series round))	Marlon Stöckinger (2012 Monza GP3 Series round)
Poland	2	0	0	Artur Janosz, Aleksander Bosak (2015 Catalunya GP3 Series round)	Artur Janosz, Aleksander Bosak (2015 Yas Marina GP3 Series round)
Portugal	1	0	0	António Félix da Costa (2010 Catalunya GP3 Series round)	António Félix da Costa (2012 Monza GP3 Series round)
Romania	2	0	0	Doru Sechelariu (2012 Monza GP3 Series round)	Robert Vișoiu (2014 Yas Marina GP3 Series round)
Russia	11	1 (Kvyat)	1 (2013)	Ivan Lukashevich (2010 Catalunya GP3 Series round)	Nikita Mazepin (2018 Yas Marina GP3 Series round)
San Marino	1	0	0	Emanuele Zonzini (2013 Catalunya GP3 Series round)	Emanuele Zonzini (2013 Yas Marina GP3 Series round)
Slovakia	1	0	0	Richard Gonda (2016 Catalunya GP3 Series round)	Richard Gonda (2016 Hungaroring GP3 Series round)
South Africa	2	0	0	Roman de Beer (2014 Catalunya GP3 Series round)	Raoul Hyman (2017 Yas Marina GP3 Series round)
Spain	7	0	0	Daniel Juncadella, Miki Monrás (2010 Catalunya GP3 Series round)	Álex Palou (2016 Yas Marina GP3 Series round)
Sweden	2	0	0	Jimmy Eriksson (2013 Catalunya GP3 Series round)	Jimmy Eriksson (2015 Yas Marina GP3 Series round)
Switzerland	10	0	0	Nico Müller, Simon Trummer (2010 Catalunya GP3 Series round)	Kevin Jörg (2017 Yas Marina GP3 Series round)
Thailand	2	0	0	Sandy Stuvik (2015 Catalunya GP3 Series round)	Alexander Albon, Sandy Stuvik (2016 Yas Marina GP3 Series round)
United Kingdom	32	2 (Lynn, Russell)	2 (2014, 2017)	James Jakes, Oliver Oakes; Adrian Quaife-Hobbs, Dean Smith (2010 Catalunya GP3 Series round)	Callum Ilott, Jake Hughes (2018 Yas Marina GP3 Series round)
United States	6	0	0	Alexander Rossi, Josef Newgarden (2010 Catalunya GP3 Series round)	Ryan Tveter (2018 Yas Marina GP3 Series round)
Uruguay	1	0	0	Santiago Urrutia (2014 Catalunya GP3 Series round)	Santiago Urrutia (2014 Yas Marina GP3 Series round)
Venezuela	1	0	0	Samin Gómez (2013 Catalunya GP3 Series round)	Samin Gómez (2015 Hungaroring GP3 Series round)

== See also ==
- List of FIA Formula 3 Championship drivers
