= 2021 GT Cup Open Europe =

The 2021 GT Cup Open Europe was the third season of the GT Cup Open Europe, the grand tourer-style sports car racing series founded by the Spanish GT Sport Organización. It began on 15 May at Paul Ricard and finished on 24 November at the Circuit de Barcelona-Catalunya after five double-header meetings.

== Entry list ==
Team	Car	No.	Drivers	Class	Rounds
(San Marino) AKM Motorsport	Lamborghini Huracán Super Trofeo Evo	12	(Italy) Glauco Solieri	Am	1,4
(Poland) A&P Racing Team PTT Tech Support	Porsche 991 GT3 II Cup	24	(Poland) Maciej Błażek	PA	1-5
(Poland) A&P Racing Team PTT Tech Support	Porsche 991 GT3 II Cup	24	(Poland) Mateusz Lisowski	PA	1-5
(Belgium) Q1 by EMG Motorsport	Porsche 991 GT3 II Cup	26	(Poland) Maciej Darmetko	PA	1
(Belgium) Q1 by EMG Motorsport	Porsche 991 GT3 II Cup	26	(Poland) Artur Janosz	PA	1
(Andorra) Three Sixty Racing Team	Porsche 991 GT3 II Cup	27	(Brazil) Marcio Mauro	Am	1-5
(Andorra) Three Sixty Racing Team	Porsche 991 GT3 II Cup	27	(Andorra) Oscar Aristot	Am	1-5
(Andorra) Three Sixty Racing Team	Porsche 991 GT3 II Cup	32	(Brazil) Fernando Fortes	Am	1-5
(Andorra) Three Sixty Racing Team	Transam Euro (Ford Mustang)	126	(Spain) Albert Estragués	Am	1,5
(Andorra) Three Sixty Racing Team	Porsche 991 GT3 I Cup	190	(Spain) Fernando Navarrete Sr.	Am	1
(Andorra) Three Sixty Racing Team	Porsche 991 GT3 I Cup	190	(Spain) Fernando Navarrete Jr.	Am	1
(Spain) J. Morcillo/E2P Racing	Porsche 991 GT3 II Cup	28	(Switzerland) Jan Klingelnberg	PA	1,5
(Spain) J. Morcillo/E2P Racing	Porsche 991 GT3 II Cup	28	(United Kingdom) Dino Zamparelli	PA	1,5
(Italy) Came Racing Team - SP Racing	Porsche 991 GT3 I Cup	44	(Italy) Stefano Bozzoni	PA	1-5
(Italy) Came Racing Team - SP Racing	Porsche 991 GT3 I Cup	44	(Italy) Eugenio Pisani	PA	1-5
(Italy) Came Racing Team - SP Racing	Porsche 991 GT3 I Cup	45	(Italy) Mark Speakerwas	Am	3
(Italy) Came Racing Team - SP Racing	Porsche 991 GT3 I Cup	45	(Hungary) Peter Karpi	Am	3
(Italy) Came Racing Team - SP Racing	Porsche 991 GT3 I Cup	45	(Italy) Mark Speakerwas	Am	5
(Italy) Came Racing Team - SP Racing	Porsche 991 GT3 I Cup	45	(Poland) Jan Antoszewski	Am	5
(Italy) Vincenzo Sospiri Racing	Lamborghini Huracán Super Trofeo Evo	66	(Poland) Andrzej Lewandowski	Am	1
(Poland) Alda Motorsport	Porsche 991 GT3 II Cup	100	(Poland) Jan Antoszewski	PA	1-4
(Poland) Alda Motorsport	Porsche 991 GT3 II Cup	100	(Poland) Jakub Dwernicki	PA	1-4
(Germany) PROsport Racing	Aston Martin Vantage AMR GT4	191	(Belgium) Rodrigue Gillion	PA	1
(Germany) PROsport Racing	Aston Martin Vantage AMR GT4	191	(Belgium) Nico Verdonck	PA	1

== Race calendar and results ==
- A provisional six-round calendar was revealed on 12 January 2021. It represents a return to normalcy after the Coronavirus pandemic forced change in the 2020 season. After being added to the previous year's revised calendar as a replacement round, the Hungaroring was originally dropped from the 2021 schedule in favor of Portimão. Due to a late schedule change for Formula 1 however, this decision was reversed. The other tracks carry over from the previous year, but on different dates.

Round		Circuit	Date	Pole position	Pro-Am Winner	Am Winner	Fastest lap
1	R1	(France) Circuit Paul Ricard, Le Castellet	15 May	(Spain) No. 28 J. Morcillo/E2P Racing	(Poland) No. 24 A&P Racing Team PTT Tech Support	(Italy) Vincenzo Sospiri Racing	(Germany) No. 191 PROsport Racing
1	R1	(France) Circuit Paul Ricard, Le Castellet	15 May	(Switzerland) Jan Klingelnberg (United Kingdom) Dino Zamparelli	(Poland) Maciej Błażek (Poland) Mateusz Lisowski	(Poland) Andrzej Lewandowski	(Belgium) Nico Verdonck (Belgium) Rodrigue Gillion
1	R2	(France) Circuit Paul Ricard, Le Castellet	16 May	(Germany) No. 191 PROsport Racing	(Germany) No. 191 PROsport Racing	(Italy) Vincenzo Sospiri Racing	(Italy) Came Racing Team - SP Racing
1	R2	(France) Circuit Paul Ricard, Le Castellet	16 May	(Belgium) Nico Verdonck (Belgium) Rodrigue Gillion	(Belgium) Nico Verdonck (Belgium) Rodrigue Gillion	(Poland) Andrzej Lewandowski	(Italy) Eugenio Pisani
2	R1	(Belgium) Circuit de Spa-Francorchamps	19 June				
2	R2	(Belgium) Circuit de Spa-Francorchamps	20 June				
3	R1	(Hungary) Hungaroring	10 July	(Belgium) Q1 by EMG Motorsport	(Poland) No. 24 A&P Racing Team PTT Tech Support	(Italy) Came Racing Team - SP Racing	(Poland) No. 24 A&P Racing Team PTT Tech Support
3	R1	(Hungary) Hungaroring	10 July	(Poland) Maciej Darmetko (Poland) Artur Janosz	(Poland) Maciej Błażek (Poland) Mateusz Lisowski	(Italy) Mark Speakerwas (Hungary) Peter Karpi	(Poland) Maciej Błażek (Poland) Mateusz Lisowski
3	R2	(Hungary) Hungaroring	11 July	(Poland) No. 24 A&P Racing Team PTT Tech Support	(Belgium) Q1 by EMG Motorsport	(Italy) Came Racing Team - SP Racing	(Belgium) Q1 by EMG Motorsport
3	R2	(Hungary) Hungaroring	11 July	(Poland) Maciej Błażek (Poland) Mateusz Lisowski	(Poland) Maciej Darmetko (Poland) Artur Janosz	(Italy) Mark Speakerwas (Hungary) Peter Karpi	(Poland) Maciej Darmetko (Poland) Artur Janosz
4	R1	(Italy) Autodromo Nazionale Monza	25 September				
4	R2	(Italy) Autodromo Nazionale Monza	26 September				
5	R1	(Spain) Circuit de Barcelona-Catalunya	23 October				
5	R2	(Spain) Circuit de Barcelona-Catalunya	24 October				

== Championship standings ==
=== Points systems ===
Points are awarded to the top 10 (Overall) or top 6 (Am, Pro-Am, Teams) classified finishers. If less than 6 participants start the race or if less than 75% of the original race distance is completed, half points are awarded. At the end of the season, the lowest race score is dropped; however, the dropped race cannot be the result of a disqualification or race ban.

==== Overall ====
Position	1st	2nd	3rd	4th	5th	6th	7th	8th	9th	10th
Points	15	12	10	8	6	5	4	3	2	1

==== Pro-Am, Am, and Teams ====
Position	1st	2nd	3rd	4th	5th	6th
Points	10	8	6	4	3	2

=== Drivers' championships ===
==== Overall ====
Pos.	Driver	Team	LEC (France)		SPA (Belgium)	HUN (Hungary)	MNZ (Italy)	CAT (Spain)	Points
1	(Poland) Andrzej Lewandowski	(Italy) Vincenzo Sospiri Racing	2	1					27
2	(Poland) Maciej Błażek (Poland) Mateusz Lisowski	(Poland) A&P Racing Team PTT Tech Support	1	4					23
3	(Belgium) Nico Verdonck (Belgium) Rodrigue Gillion	(Germany) PROsport Racing	3	2					22
4	(Poland) Maciej Darmetko (Poland) Artur Janosz	(Belgium) Q1 by EMG Motorsport	4	3					18
5	(Italy) Glauco Solieri	(San Marino) AKM Motorsport	5	5					12
6	(Brazil) Fernando Fortes	(Andorra) Three Sixty Racing Team	7	7					8
7	(Poland) Jakub Dwernicki (Poland) Jan Antoszewski	(Poland) Alda Motorsport	6	8					8
8	(Switzerland) Jan Klingelnberg (United Kingdom) Dino Zamparelli	(Spain) J. Morcillo/E2P Racing	10	6					6
9	(Italy) Eugenio Pisani (Italy) Stefano Bozzoni	(Italy) Eugenio Pisani	8	9					5
10	(Spain) Fernando Navarrete Sr. (Spain) Fernando Navarrete Jr.	(Andorra) Three Sixty Racing Team	9	10					3
-	(Brazil) Marcio Mauro (Andorra) Oscar Aristot	(Andorra) Three Sixty Racing Team	11	11					-
-	(Spain) Albert Estragués	(Andorra) Three Sixty Racing Team	Ret	Ret					-
Pos.	Driver	Team	LEC (France)		SPA (Belgium)	HUN (Hungary)	MNZ (Italy)	CAT (Spain)	Points

==== Pro-Am ====
Pos.	Driver	Team	LEC (France)		SPA (Belgium)	HUN (Hungary)	MNZ (Italy)	CAT (Spain)	Points
1	(Belgium) Nico Verdonck (Belgium) Rodrigue Gillion	(Germany) PROsport Racing	2	1					18
2	(Poland) Maciej Błażek (Poland) Mateusz Lisowski	(Poland) A&P Racing Team PTT Tech Support	1	3					16
3	(Poland) Maciej Darmetko (Poland) Artur Janosz	(Belgium) Q1 by EMG Motorsport	3	2					14
4	(Poland) Jakub Dwernicki (Poland) Jan Antoszewski	(Poland) Alda Motorsport	4	5					7
5	(Switzerland) Jan Klingelnberg (United Kingdom) Dino Zamparelli	(Spain) J. Morcillo/E2P Racing	6	4					6
6	(Italy) Eugenio Pisani (Italy) Stefano Bozzoni	(Italy) Eugenio Pisani	5	6					5
Pos.	Driver	Team	LEC (France)		SPA (Belgium)	HUN (Hungary)	MNZ (Italy)	CAT (Spain)	Points

==== Am ====
Pos.	Driver	Team	LEC (France)		SPA (Belgium)	HUN (Hungary)	MNZ (Italy)	CAT (Spain)	Points
1	(Poland) Andrzej Lewandowski	(Italy) Vincenzo Sospiri Racing	1	1					20
2	(Italy) Glauco Solieri	(San Marino) AKM Motorsport	2	2					16
3	(Brazil) Fernando Fortes	(Andorra) Three Sixty Racing Team	3	3					12
4	(Spain) Fernando Navarrete Sr. (Spain) Fernando Navarrete Jr.	(Andorra) Three Sixty Racing Team	4	4					8
5	(Brazil) Marcio Mauro (Andorra) Oscar Aristot	(Andorra) Three Sixty Racing Team	5	5					6
-	(Spain) Albert Estragués	(Andorra) Three Sixty Racing Team	Ret	Ret					-
Pos.	Driver	Team	LEC (France)		SPA (Belgium)	HUN (Hungary)	MNZ (Italy)	CAT (Spain)	Points

=== Teams' Championship ===
Only the highest two finishing cars from a team count towards the Teams' Championship

Pos.	Team	Manufacturer	Points
1	(Italy) Vincenzo Sospiri Racing	Lamborghini	18
2	(Germany) PROsport Racing	Aston Martin	14
3	(Poland) A&P Racing Team PTT Tech Support	Porsche	14
4	(Belgium) Q1 by EMG Motorsport	Porsche	10
5	(San Marino) AKM Motorsport	Lamborghini	6
6	(Spain) J. Morcillo/E2P Racing	Porsche	6
7	(Poland) Alda Motorsport	Porsche	2
-	(Italy) Eugenio Pisani	Porsche	-
-	(Andorra) Three Sixty Racing Team	Porsche/Transam Euro	-
Pos.	Team	Manufacturer	Points
