= 2015 GP3 Series =

Season of motor racing competitions

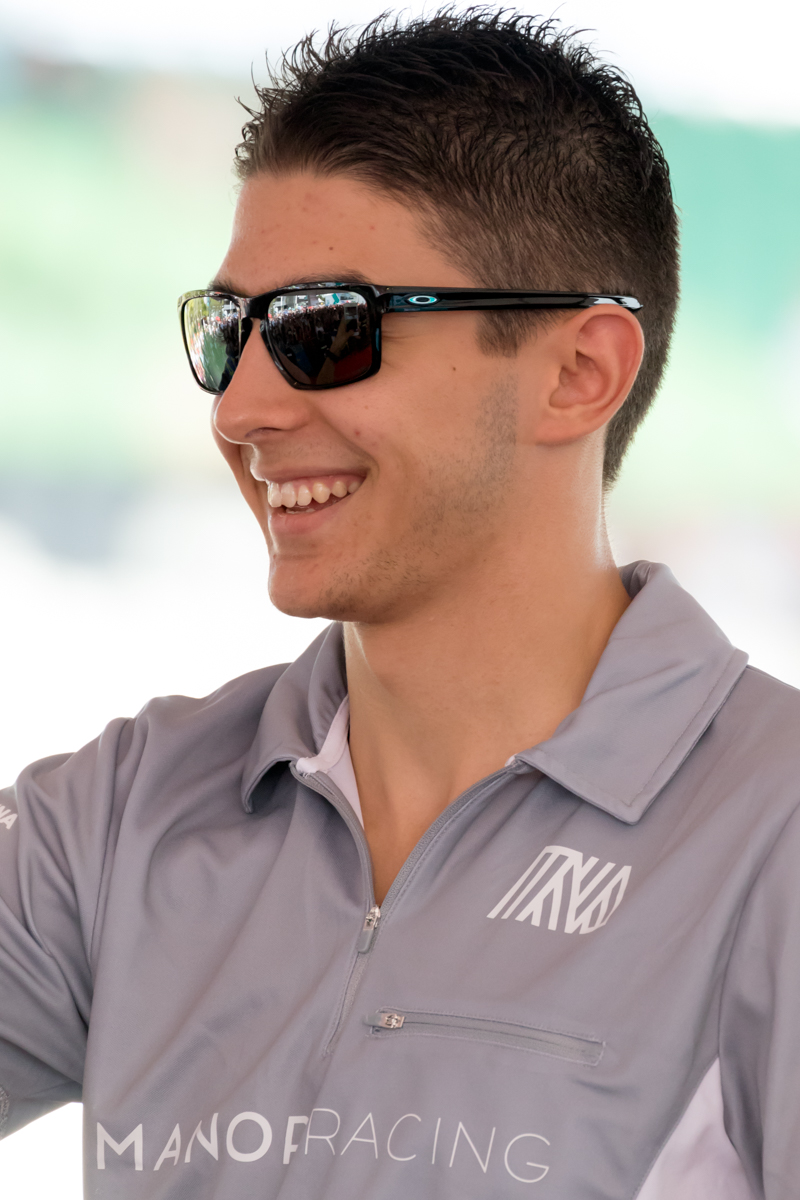
Esteban Ocon (pictured in 2016), the series champion.

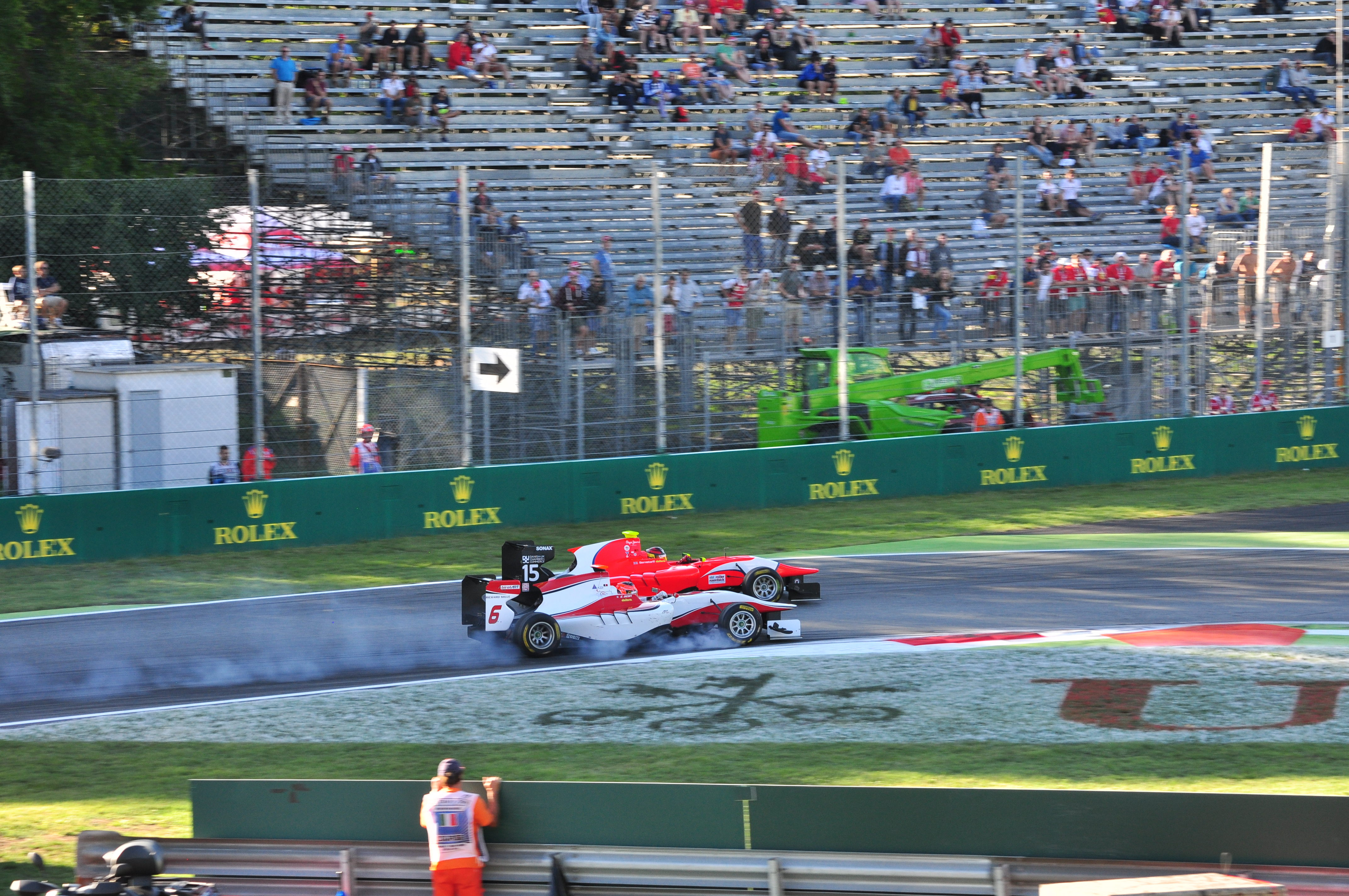
2015 champion Esteban Ocon overtaking Emil Bernstorff

The 2015 GP3 Series was the sixth season of the third-tier of Formula One feeder championship and also sixth season under the moniker of GP3 Series, a motor racing feeder series that was run in support of the 2015 FIA Formula One World Championship and sister series GP2. Thirty-one drivers represented eight teams over the course of the season's nine rounds, starting in Spain on 9 May and ending in Abu Dhabi on 29 November. It was the final season for the Dallara GP3/13-AER P57 V6 chassis and engine package that debuted in 2013. A new Dallara-built chassis was introduced for 2016 along with a Mecachrome normally-aspirated V6 engine.

French driver Esteban Ocon (ART Grand Prix) finished the campaign as the drivers' champion after a season-long battle with Trident driver Luca Ghiotto. Despite winning only one race in 2015 – the first race in Barcelona – Ocon took fourteen podium finishes, including a run of nine successive runner-up placings over the mid-course of the season. Ocon ultimately finished eight points clear of Ghiotto, who won a season-high five races. Another five-time winner, Marvin Kirchhöfer, completed the championship top three, some fifty-three points behind team-mate Ocon. The performances of Ocon and Kirchhöfer were more than enough for ART Grand Prix to regain the teams' championship title they had missed out on for the first time in 2014. Five other drivers took race victories during the 2015 season; Arden International pairing Emil Bernstorff and Kevin Ceccon each took two victories, while Jimmy Eriksson, Álex Palou and Óscar Tunjo each took sprint race victories, which were held with partially-reversed grids – an inversion of the top eight finishers in the previous day's feature race.

== Teams and drivers ==
The following teams competed in the 2015 season:

Team	No.	Drivers	Rounds
(United Kingdom) Carlin	1	(Italy) Antonio Fuoco	All
(United Kingdom) Carlin	2	(United Kingdom) Jann Mardenborough	1–5, 7–8
(United Kingdom) Carlin	2	(Hong Kong) Adderly Fong	9
(United Kingdom) Carlin	3	(Australia) Mitchell Gilbert	All
(France) ART Grand Prix	4	(Mexico) Alfonso Celis Jr.	1–5, 7–9
(France) ART Grand Prix	5	(Germany) Marvin Kirchhöfer	All
(France) ART Grand Prix	6	(France) Esteban Ocon	All
(Canada) Status Grand Prix (Note: Status Grand Prix competed under a Canadian license.)	7	(United Kingdom) Seb Morris	All
(Canada) Status Grand Prix	8	(Switzerland) Alex Fontana	All
(Canada) Status Grand Prix	9	(Thailand) Sandy Stuvik	All
(Finland) Koiranen GP	10	(Hong Kong) Adderly Fong	1–5, 7
(Finland) Koiranen GP	10	(Russia) Matevos Isaakyan	8–9
(Finland) Koiranen GP	11	(Sweden) Jimmy Eriksson	All
(Finland) Koiranen GP	12	(United Kingdom) Matt Parry	All
(United Kingdom) Arden International	14	(Italy) Kevin Ceccon	All
(United Kingdom) Arden International	15	(United Kingdom) Emil Bernstorff	All
(United Kingdom) Arden International	16	(Poland) Aleksander Bosak	All
(Switzerland) Jenzer Motorsport	20	(Norway) Pål Varhaug	All
(Switzerland) Jenzer Motorsport	21	(Switzerland) Mathéo Tuscher	All
(Switzerland) Jenzer Motorsport	22	(Switzerland) Ralph Boschung	All
(Spain) Campos Racing	23	(Kuwait) Zaid Ashkanani	All
(Spain) Campos Racing	24	(Spain) Álex Palou	All
(Spain) Campos Racing	25	(Venezuela) Samin Gómez (Note: Gómez competed under a state Venezuelan racing licence.)	1–2, 4
(Spain) Campos Racing	25	(Austria) Christopher Höher	3
(Spain) Campos Racing	25	(France) Brandon Maïsano	6
(Spain) Campos Racing	25	(Russia) Konstantin Tereshchenko	7–9
(Italy) Trident	26	(Poland) Artur Janosz	All
(Italy) Trident	27	(Italy) Luca Ghiotto	All
(Italy) Trident	28	(Colombia) Óscar Tunjo	1–3
(Italy) Trident	28	(Netherlands) Beitske Visser	5
(Italy) Trident	28	(Belgium) Amaury Bonduel	6
(Italy) Trident	28	(Italy) Michele Beretta	7–9

=== Driver changes ===
==== Changing teams ====
- Emil Bernstorff switched from Carlin to Arden International.
- Kevin Ceccon switched from Jenzer Motorsport to Arden International.
- Alfonso Celis Jr., who raced for Status Grand Prix switched to ART Grand Prix.
- Adderly Fong moved from Jenzer Motorsport to Koiranen GP.
- Alex Fontana left ART Grand Prix to join Status Grand Prix.
- Mitchell Gilbert and Jann Mardenborough, who raced for Trident and Arden International respectively in 2014, raced for Carlin.

==== Entering GP3 ====
- 2014 European Formula 3 Championship winner Esteban Ocon stepped up to the series with ART Grand Prix.
- Zaid Ashkanani, the 2014 Porsche GT3 Cup Challenge Middle East champion, moved into the series with Campos Racing.
- Aleksander Bosak graduated from the Formula Renault 2.0 Alps series, joining Arden International.
- Seb Morris stepped up to the series from Formula Renault 2.0 NEC, joining Status Grand Prix.
- Matt Parry graduated to the series with Koiranen GP, having competed in various Formula Renault series in 2014.
- ADAC Formel Masters driver Ralph Boschung graduated to the series with Jenzer Motorsport.
- Antonio Fuoco, who finished fifth in the 2014 European Formula 3 Championship, moved into the series – as a Ferrari Driver Academy member – with Carlin.
- The top three drivers from the 2014 Euroformula Open Championship competed in the GP3 Series in 2015. Sandy Stuvik, Artur Janosz and Álex Palou made their débuts with Status Grand Prix, Trident and Campos Racing respectively.
- 2014 Formula Renault 3.5 Series driver Óscar Tunjo moved to the GP3 Series with Trident.

==== Leaving GP3 ====
- 2014 series champion Alex Lynn left the series to compete in GP2 with DAMS.
- 2014 series runner-up Dean Stoneman left the series to compete in Formula Renault 3.5 with DAMS, after joining the Red Bull Junior Team.
- Kang Ling left the series to compete in the European Formula 3 Championship with kfzteile24 Mücke Motorsport.
- Patric Niederhauser left the GP3 Series and moved to the Lamborghini Super Trofeo Europe with the Raton Racing team.
- Santiago Urrutia left the series to compete in the Pro Mazda Championship with Team Pelfrey.
- Robert Vișoiu left the series to compete in GP2 with Rapax.
- Dino Zamparelli left the series to compete in the Porsche Carrera Cup Great Britain with Parr Motorsport.
- Richie Stanaway left the series to compete in GP2 with Status Grand Prix.

=== Team changes ===
- Following the bankruptcy of the Marussia F1 team, Marussia Manor Racing decided to leave the GP3 Series. With no replacement team found, the number of teams competing in the 2015 season was reduced to eight.
- Campos Racing entered the series, replacing Hilmer Motorsport.

== Calendar ==
In December 2014, the full 2015 calendar was revealed with nine events.

Round		Circuit/Location	Country	Date	Supporting
1	R1	Circuit de Barcelona-Catalunya, Barcelona	Spain	9 May	Spanish Grand Prix
1	R2	Circuit de Barcelona-Catalunya, Barcelona	Spain	10 May	Spanish Grand Prix
2	R1	Red Bull Ring, Spielberg	Austria	20 June	Austrian Grand Prix
2	R2	Red Bull Ring, Spielberg	Austria	21 June	Austrian Grand Prix
3	R1	Silverstone Circuit, Silverstone	United Kingdom	4 July	British Grand Prix
3	R2	Silverstone Circuit, Silverstone	United Kingdom	5 July	British Grand Prix
4	R1	Hungaroring, Budapest	Hungary	25 July	Hungarian Grand Prix
4	R2	Hungaroring, Budapest	Hungary	26 July	Hungarian Grand Prix
5	R1	Circuit de Spa-Francorchamps, Francorchamps	Belgium	22 August	Belgian Grand Prix
5	R2	Circuit de Spa-Francorchamps, Francorchamps	Belgium	23 August	Belgian Grand Prix
6	R1	Autodromo Nazionale Monza, Monza	Italy	5 September	Italian Grand Prix
6	R2	Autodromo Nazionale Monza, Monza	Italy	6 September	Italian Grand Prix
7	R1	Sochi Autodrom, Sochi	Russia	11 October	Russian Grand Prix
7	R2	Sochi Autodrom, Sochi	Russia	11 October	Russian Grand Prix
8	R1	Bahrain International Circuit, Sakhir	Bahrain	20 November	6 Hours of Bahrain
8	R2	Bahrain International Circuit, Sakhir	Bahrain	21 November	6 Hours of Bahrain
9	R1	Yas Marina Circuit, Abu Dhabi	United Arab Emirates	28 November	Abu Dhabi Grand Prix
9	R2	Yas Marina Circuit, Abu Dhabi	United Arab Emirates	29 November	Abu Dhabi Grand Prix

=== Calendar changes ===
- The series was scheduled to run in support of the German Grand Prix, at a venue that, at the time of the calendar's publication, had not yet been decided. With the cancellation of the German Grand Prix, the planned GP2 meeting was rescheduled to Bahrain International Circuit in the 2015 6 Hours of Bahrain weekend.

== Results ==
Round		Circuit	Pole position	Fastest lap	Winning driver	Winning team	Report
1	R1	(Spain) Circuit de Barcelona-Catalunya	(Italy) Luca Ghiotto	(France) Esteban Ocon	(France) Esteban Ocon	(France) ART Grand Prix	Report
1	R2	(Spain) Circuit de Barcelona-Catalunya		(Germany) Marvin Kirchhöfer	(Germany) Marvin Kirchhöfer	(France) ART Grand Prix	Report
2	R1	(Austria) Red Bull Ring	(Italy) Luca Ghiotto	(Italy) Luca Ghiotto	(Italy) Luca Ghiotto	(Italy) Trident	Report
2	R2	(Austria) Red Bull Ring		(Italy) Luca Ghiotto	(Colombia) Óscar Tunjo	(Italy) Trident	Report
3	R1	(United Kingdom) Silverstone Circuit	(Germany) Marvin Kirchhöfer	(Italy) Luca Ghiotto	(Germany) Marvin Kirchhöfer	(France) ART Grand Prix	Report
3	R2	(United Kingdom) Silverstone Circuit		(Italy) Kevin Ceccon	(Italy) Kevin Ceccon	(United Kingdom) Arden International	Report
4	R1	(Hungary) Hungaroring	(Italy) Luca Ghiotto	(Italy) Luca Ghiotto	(Italy) Luca Ghiotto	(Italy) Trident	Report
4	R2	(Hungary) Hungaroring		(France) Esteban Ocon	(Italy) Kevin Ceccon	(United Kingdom) Arden International	Report
5	R1	(Belgium) Circuit de Spa-Francorchamps	(Italy) Luca Ghiotto	(Italy) Luca Ghiotto	(United Kingdom) Emil Bernstorff	(United Kingdom) Arden International	Report
5	R2	(Belgium) Circuit de Spa-Francorchamps		(Italy) Luca Ghiotto	(Italy) Luca Ghiotto	(Italy) Trident	Report
6	R1	(Italy) Autodromo Nazionale Monza	(Italy) Luca Ghiotto	(United Kingdom) Emil Bernstorff	(United Kingdom) Emil Bernstorff	(United Kingdom) Arden International	Report
6	R2	(Italy) Autodromo Nazionale Monza		(Italy) Luca Ghiotto	(Germany) Marvin Kirchhöfer	(France) ART Grand Prix	Report
7	R1	(Russia) Sochi Autodrom	(France) Esteban Ocon	(France) Esteban Ocon	(Italy) Luca Ghiotto	(Italy) Trident	Report
7	R2	(Russia) Sochi Autodrom		(France) Esteban Ocon	(Sweden) Jimmy Eriksson	(Finland) Koiranen GP	Report
8	R1	Bahrain International Circuit	(France) Esteban Ocon	(Italy) Luca Ghiotto	(Germany) Marvin Kirchhöfer	(France) ART Grand Prix	Report
8	R2	Bahrain International Circuit		(Italy) Luca Ghiotto	(Italy) Luca Ghiotto	(Italy) Trident	Report
9	R1	(United Arab Emirates) Yas Marina Circuit	(France) Esteban Ocon	(France) Esteban Ocon	(Germany) Marvin Kirchhöfer	(France) ART Grand Prix	Report
9	R2	(United Arab Emirates) Yas Marina Circuit		(Spain) Álex Palou	(Spain) Álex Palou	(Spain) Campos Racing	Report

== Championship standings ==
Scoring system

Points were awarded to the top 10 classified finishers in the race 1, and to the top 8 classified finishers in the race 2. The pole-sitter in the race 1 also received four points, and two points were given to the driver who set the fastest lap inside the top ten in both the race 1 and race 2. No extra points were awarded to the pole-sitter in the race 2.

Race 1 points

Position	**1st**	**2nd**	**3rd**	**4th**	**5th**	**6th**	**7th**	**8th**	**9th**	**10th**	**Pole**	**FL**
Points	25	18	15	12	10	8	6	4	2	1	4	2

Race 2 points

Points were awarded to the top 8 classified finishers.

Position	**1st**	**2nd**	**3rd**	**4th**	**5th**	**6th**	**7th**	**8th**	**FL**
Points	15	12	10	8	6	4	2	1	2

=== Drivers' championship ===
Pos.	Driver	CAT (Spain)		RBR (Austria)		SIL (United Kingdom)		HUN (Hungary)		SPA (Belgium)		MNZ (Italy)		SOC (Russia)		BHR (Bahrain)		YMC (United Arab Emirates)		Points
Pos.	Driver	R1	R2	R1	R2	R1	R2	R1	R2	R1	R2	R1	R2	R1	R2	R1	R2	R1	R2	Points
1	(France) Esteban Ocon	1	7	3	DSQ	6	2	2	2	2	2	2	2	**2**	2	**3**	2	**4**	3	253
2	(Italy) Luca Ghiotto	**2**	8	**1**	3	4	7	**1**	4	**5**	1	**Ret**	3	1	8	4	1	5	4	245
3	(Germany) Marvin Kirchhöfer	5	1	6	2	**1**	8	3	5	3	Ret	4	1	9	7	1	6	1	7	200
4	(United Kingdom) Emil Bernstorff	3	5	4	4	2	6	4	Ret	1	Ret	1	Ret	3	6	2	4	2	6	194
5	(Sweden) Jimmy Eriksson	6	2	20†	10	5	4	6	6	13	16	5	5	8	1	5	7	3	5	118
6	(Italy) Antonio Fuoco	8	4	2	Ret	18	23	8	Ret	4	Ret	Ret	11	6	4	9	5	7	2	88
7	(Italy) Kevin Ceccon	7	6	Ret	DNS	7	1	7	1	Ret	13	3	4	Ret	DNS	14	18	Ret	10	77
8	(United Kingdom) Matt Parry	13	9	13	7	3	5	5	3	Ret	Ret	DSQ	Ret	7	Ret	11	3	6	24	67
9	(United Kingdom) Jann Mardenborough	4	3	5	13	17	15	Ret	17	Ret	12			5	3	7	Ret			58
10	(Spain) Álex Palou	12	20	14	Ret	Ret	13	19	18	7	5	7	10	4	9	Ret	10	8	1	51
11	(Switzerland) Ralph Boschung	Ret	14	8	8	8	3	13	8	9	8	9	7	11	DNS	10	9	12	11	28
12	(Mexico) Alfonso Celis Jr.	10	10	15	Ret	13	11	18	15	6	3			13	12	8	8	Ret	19	24
13	(Switzerland) Mathéo Tuscher	14	13	12	DSQ	10	9	10	9	Ret	4	6	6	Ret	Ret	12	Ret	16	14	22
14	(Poland) Artur Janosz	15	12	21	9	9	17	16	Ret	12	7	16	Ret	10	5	6	12	10	9	20
15	(Colombia) Óscar Tunjo	16	11	9	1	11	10													17
16	(Switzerland) Alex Fontana	9	16	10	6	19	18	14	13	10	6	8	16	19	11	19	19	15	13	16
17	(Thailand) Sandy Stuvik	18	17	7	Ret	22	20	22	14	Ret	17	11	8	16	17	13	Ret	17	16	7
18	(United Kingdom) Seb Morris	Ret	24	19	5	15	12	12	12	Ret	14	DSQ	Ret	14	10	16	Ret	13	15	6
19	(Norway) Pål Varhaug	21	18	11	Ret	16	19	9	7	Ret	10	Ret	14	Ret	14	Ret	Ret	11	8	5
20	(Poland) Aleksander Bosak	19	23	16	15	14	16	17	19	8	Ret	15	Ret	Ret	20	Ret	16	18	23	4
21	(Russia) Matevos Isaakyan															Ret	14	9	12	2
22	(Australia) Mitchell Gilbert	22†	22	Ret	11	20	21	11	10	11	11	10	9	12	15	15	11	14	17	1
23	(Hong Kong) Adderly Fong	17	21	17	12	12	14	15	11	15	9			15	18			Ret	22	0
24	(Kuwait) Zaid Ashkanani	11	15	18	14	21	22	20	16	14	18	13	15	20	19	17	13	19	21	0
25	(France) Brandon Maïsano											12	13							0
26	(Belgium) Amaury Bonduel											14	12							0
27	(Italy) Michele Beretta													18	13	20	15	20	18	0
28	(Netherlands) Beitske Visser									Ret	15									0
29	(Russia) Konstantin Tereshchenko													17	16	18	17	Ret	20	0
30	(Venezuela) Samin Gómez	20	19	Ret	16			21	Ret											0
31	(Austria) Christopher Höher					23	24													0
Pos.	Driver	R1	R2	R1	R2	R1	R2	R1	R2	R1	R2	R1	R2	R1	R2	R1	R2	R1	R2	Points
Pos.	Driver	CAT (Spain)		RBR (Austria)		SIL (United Kingdom)		HUN (Hungary)		SPA (Belgium)		MNZ (Italy)		SOC (Russia)		BHR (Bahrain)		YMC (United Arab Emirates)		Points

Key
Colour	Result
Gold	Winner
Silver	2nd place
Bronze	3rd place
Green	Other points position
Blue	Other classified position
Blue	Not classified, finished (NC)
Purple	Not classified, retired (Ret)
Red	Did not qualify (DNQ)
Red	Did not pre-qualify (DNPQ)
Black	Disqualified (DSQ)
White	Did not start (DNS)
White	Race cancelled (C)
Blank	Did not practice (DNP)
Blank	Excluded (EX)
Blank	Did not arrive (DNA)
Blank	Withdrawn (WD)
Text formatting	Meaning
**Bold**	Pole position point(s)
Italics	Fastest lap point(s)

Notes

- † — Drivers did not finish the race, but were classified as they completed over 90% of the race distance.

=== Teams' championship ===
Pos.	Team	No.	CAT (Spain)		RBR (Austria)		SIL (United Kingdom)		HUN (Hungary)		SPA (Belgium)		MNZ (Italy)		SOC (Russia)		BHR (Bahrain)		YMC (United Arab Emirates)		Points
Pos.	Team	No.	R1	R2	R1	R2	R1	R2	R1	R2	R1	R2	R1	R2	R1	R2	R1	R2	R1	R2	Points
1	(France) ART Grand Prix	4	10	10	15	Ret	13	11	18	15	6	3			13	12	8	8	Ret	19	477
1	(France) ART Grand Prix	5	5	1	6	2	**1**	8	3	5	3	Ret	4	1	9	7	1	6	1	7	477
1	(France) ART Grand Prix	6	1	7	3	DSQ	6	2	2	2	2	2	2	2	**2**	2	**3**	2	**4**	3	477
2	(Italy) Trident	26	15	12	21	9	9	17	16	Ret	12	7	16	Ret	10	5	6	12	10	9	282
2	(Italy) Trident	27	**2**	8	**1**	3	4	7	**1**	4	**5**	1	**Ret**	3	1	8	4	1	5	4	282
2	(Italy) Trident	28	16	11	9	1	11	10			Ret	15	14	12	18	13	20	15	20	18	282
3	(United Kingdom) Arden International	14	7	6	Ret	DNS	7	1	7	1	Ret	13	3	4	Ret	DNS	14	18	Ret	10	275
3	(United Kingdom) Arden International	15	3	5	4	4	2	6	4	Ret	1	Ret	1	Ret	3	6	2	4	2	6	275
3	(United Kingdom) Arden International	16	19	23	16	15	14	16	17	19	8	Ret	15	Ret	Ret	20	Ret	16	18	23	275
4	(Finland) Koiranen GP	10	17	21	17	12	12	14	15	11	15	9			15	18	Ret	14	9	12	187
4	(Finland) Koiranen GP	11	6	2	20†	10	5	4	6	6	13	16	5	5	8	1	5	7	3	5	187
4	(Finland) Koiranen GP	12	13	9	13	7	3	5	5	3	Ret	Ret	DSQ	Ret	7	Ret	11	3	6	24	187
5	(United Kingdom) Carlin	1	8	4	2	Ret	18	23	8	Ret	4	Ret	Ret	11	6	4	9	5	7	2	147
5	(United Kingdom) Carlin	2	4	3	5	13	17	15	Ret	17	Ret	12			5	3	7	Ret	Ret	22	147
5	(United Kingdom) Carlin	3	22†	22	Ret	11	20	21	11	10	11	11	10	9	12	15	15	11	14	17	147
6	(Switzerland) Jenzer Motorsport	20	21	18	11	Ret	16	19	9	7	Ret	10	Ret	14	Ret	14	Ret	Ret	11	8	55
6	(Switzerland) Jenzer Motorsport	21	14	13	12	DSQ	10	9	10	9	Ret	4	6	6	Ret	Ret	12	Ret	16	14	55
6	(Switzerland) Jenzer Motorsport	22	Ret	14	8	8	8	3	13	8	9	8	9	7	11	DNS	10	9	12	11	55
7	(Spain) Campos Racing	23	11	15	18	14	21	22	20	16	14	18	13	15	20	19	17	13	19	21	51
7	(Spain) Campos Racing	24	12	20	14	Ret	Ret	13	19	18	7	5	7	10	4	9	Ret	10	8	1	51
7	(Spain) Campos Racing	25	20	19	Ret	16	23	24	21	Ret			12	13	17	16	18	17	Ret	20	51
8	(Canada) Status Grand Prix	7	Ret	24	19	5	15	12	12	12	Ret	14	DSQ	Ret	14	10	16	Ret	13	15	29
8	(Canada) Status Grand Prix	8	9	16	10	6	19	18	14	13	10	6	8	16	19	11	19	19	15	13	29
8	(Canada) Status Grand Prix	9	18	17	7	Ret	22	20	22	14	Ret	17	11	8	16	17	13	Ret	17	16	29
Pos.	Team	No.	R1	R2	R1	R2	R1	R2	R1	R2	R1	R2	R1	R2	R1	R2	R1	R2	R1	R2	Points
Pos.	Team	No.	CAT (Spain)		RBR (Austria)		SIL (United Kingdom)		HUN (Hungary)		SPA (Belgium)		MNZ (Italy)		SOC (Russia)		BHR (Bahrain)		YMC (United Arab Emirates)		Points
