= Artur Janosz =

Polish racing driver (born 1993)

- Nationality: (Poland) Polish
- Born: Artur Sebastian Janosz; 16 June 1993 (age 33) Pszczyna, Poland

GP3 Series career
- Debut season: 2015
- Current team: Trident
- Categorisation: FIA Silver
- Car number: 6
- Starts: 36
- Wins: 0
- Poles: 0
- Fastest laps: 0
- Best finish: 14th in 2015

Previous series
- 2013-14: Euroformula Open
Medal record
GT3
Representing Poland
FIA Motorsport Games
Silver medal – second place	2019 Rome	GT Cup

Artur Sebastian Janosz (born 16 June 1993) is a Polish former racing driver.

== Career ==
=== Karting ===
Born on 16 June 1993 in Pszczyna, Janosz began karting in 2010 in the local Senior category of the Rotax International Open, in which he became 24th. This is the only registered karting championship in which he competed.

=== Euroformula Open ===
Janosz graduated to the European F3 Open Championship, with Campos Racing, in 2013. He finished in the points three times: in the second race in Spa-Francorchamps and both races in Monza. He became 13th in the championship with sixteen points.

Janosz remained in the series, now renamed as the Euroformula Open Championship, with RP Motorsport. He finished as runner-up in the championship 89 points behind teammate Sandy Stuvik, who won a staggering eleven out of sixteen races.

=== GP3 Series ===
In 2015, Janosz would move up to GP3 with Trident.

== Racing record ==
=== Career summary ===
Season	Series	Team	Races	Wins	Poles	F/Laps	Podiums	Points	Position
2013	European F3 Open	Campos Racing	16	0	0	0	0	16	13th
2013	European F3 Open Winter Series	Campos Racing	2	0	0	0	0	N/A	NC
2014	Euroformula Open Championship	RP Motorsport	16	2	3	4	9	243	**2nd**
2014	Euroformula Open Winter Series	RP Motorsport	1	0	0	0	0	N/A	NC
2014	Spanish Formula 3 Championship	RP Motorsport	6	1	1	1	3	91	**3rd**
2015	GP3 Series	Trident	18	0	0	0	0	20	14th
2015	FIA Formula 3 European Championship	EuroInternational	3	0	0	0	0	0	33rd
2016	GP3 Series	Trident	18	0	0	0	0	3	20th
2016	Formula V8 3.5 Series	RP Motorsport	2	0	0	0	0	2	19th
2017	Lamborghini Super Trofeo Asia - Pro	Orange 1 Team Lazarus	12	2	0	2	9	118	**2nd**
2017	Lamborghini Super Trofeo World Final	Orange 1 Team Lazarus	1	0	0	0	0	0	?
2017	Blancpain GT Series Endurance Cup	Orange 1 Team Lazarus	1	0	0	0	0	0	NC
2018	Lamborghini Super Trofeo Asia - Pro	FFF Racing Team	12	5	2	0	9	142	**1st**
2018	Lamborghini Super Trofeo World Final	FFF Racing Team	2	0	0	0	1	13	4th
2019	FIA Motorsport Games GT Cup	Team Poland	1	0	0	0	1	N/A	**2nd**
2021	GT Cup Open Europe	Q1 by EMG Motorsport	7	1	2	2	3	53	4th
2021	GT Cup Open Europe - Pro-Am	Q1 by EMG Motorsport	7	1	2	2	4	28	4th
2021	International GT Open	Q1 by EMG Motorsport	1	0	0	0	0	0	NC†

^{†} As Janosz was a guest driver, he was ineligible to score points. ^{*} Season still in progress.

=== Complete GP3 Series results ===
(key) (Races in bold indicate pole position) (Races in italics indicate fastest lap)

Year	Entrant	1	2	3	4	5	6	7	8	9	10	11	12	13	14	15	16	17	18	Pos	Points
2015	Trident	CAT; FEA; 15	CAT; SPR; 12	RBR; FEA; 21	RBR; SPR; 9	SIL; FEA; 9	SIL; SPR; 17	HUN; FEA; 16	HUN; SPR; Ret	SPA; FEA; 12	SPA; SPR; 7	MNZ; FEA; 16	MNZ; SPR; Ret	SOC; FEA; 10	SOC; SPR; 5	BHR; FEA; 6	BHR; SPR; 12	YMC; FEA; 10	YMC; SPR; 9	14th	20
2016	Trident	CAT; FEA; 16	CAT; SPR; 12	RBR; FEA; 11	RBR; SPR; 9	SIL; FEA; 9	SIL; SPR; 15	HUN; FEA; 14	HUN; SPR; 12	HOC; FEA; 11	HOC; SPR; Ret	SPA; FEA; 12	SPA; SPR; 9	MNZ; FEA; 16	MNZ; SPR; 8	SEP; FEA; Ret	SEP; SPR; 16	YMC; FEA; Ret	YMC; SPR; 19	20th	3

=== Complete Formula V8 3.5 Series results ===
(key) (Races in bold indicate pole position) (Races in italics indicate fastest lap)

Year	Team	1	2	3	4	5	6	7	8	9	10	11	12	13	14	15	16	17	18	Pos.	Points
2016	RP Motorsport	ALC; 1	ALC; 2	HUN; 1	HUN; 2	SPA; 1	SPA; 2	LEC; 1; 12	LEC; 2; 9	SIL; 1	SIL; 2	RBR; 1	RBR; 2	MNZ; 1	MNZ; 2	JER; 1	JER; 2	CAT; 1	CAT; 2	19th	2
