= 2014 Euroformula Open Championship =

Motor racing competition

The 2014 Euroformula Open Championship was a multi-event motor racing championship for single-seat open wheel formula racing cars that was held across Europe. The championship featured drivers competing in two-litre Formula Three racing cars built by Italian constructor Dallara which conformed to the technical regulations, or formula, for the championship. It was the first edition of the Euroformula Open Championship – following a name change in February 2014 – after five seasons at the European F3 Open Championship. It is also included a revived three-round Spanish Formula Three Championship, held within the season calendar.

Sandy Stuvik dominated the championship and clinched the title with a round to spare, collecting eleven wins in sixteen races. His RP Motorsport team-mate Artur Janosz was victorious at Portimão and the Hungaroring, finishing the season as runner-up. Campos Racing driver Álex Palou bookended the season, winning the opening race at the Nürburgring and the final race at Circuit de Barcelona-Catalunya. He also won a race at the Hungaroring and completed the top three in the standings, finishing a point behind Janosz.

A Championship Cup class was also held for older machinery, with Costantino Peroni taking the title after three race victories from four attempts. Both Peroni and Saud Al Faisal moved up to Dallara F312 chassis, and there were no further competitors in the class for the remainder of the season. RP Motorsport won the teams' championship, after the 13 wins for Stuvik and Janosz, while Palou's victories helped Campos Racing to the runner-up position. All three title winners repeated their titles in the Spanish championship standings. Stuvik won the drivers' title by 13 points from Palou, after 4 victories from the 6 counting races. Peroni was the only competitor in the Cup class, winning both races at Portimão, while RP Motorsport won 5 of 6 races to take the teams' standings.

== Teams and drivers ==
- All cars were powered by Toyota engines. All Championship Class cars were equipped with the Dallara F312 chassis, while Championship Cup Class cars were equipped with the Dallara F308 chassis.

Team	No.	Driver	Rounds
Championship Class
(Italy) RP Motorsport	1	(Thailand) Sandy Stuvik	NC, All
(Italy) RP Motorsport	2	(Poland) Artur Janosz	NC, All
(Italy) RP Motorsport	3	(Guatemala) Andrés Saravia	All
(Italy) RP Motorsport	4	(Russia) John Simonyan	NC, All
(Italy) RP Motorsport	24	(Saudi Arabia) Saud Al Faisal	2–8
(United Kingdom) Team West-Tec F3	5	(Israel) Yarin Stern	NC, All
(United Kingdom) Team West-Tec F3	6	(United Kingdom) Cameron Twynham	NC, 1–4
(United Kingdom) Team West-Tec F3	6	(Poland) Igor Waliłko	8
(United Kingdom) Team West-Tec F3	7	(Germany) Nicolas Pohler	NC, 1–7
(United Kingdom) Team West-Tec F3	7	(Germany) Fabian Schiller	8
(United Kingdom) Team West-Tec F3	8	(Thailand) Tanart Sathienthirakul	NC, All
(United Kingdom) Team West-Tec F3	9	(Austria) Christopher Höher	NC
(United Kingdom) Team West-Tec F3	9	(Hong Kong) Wei Fung Thong	All
(Spain) EmiliodeVillota Motorsport	10	(Colombia) Tatiana Calderon	NC
(Spain) EmiliodeVillota Motorsport	10	(Spain) Igor Urien	1
(Spain) EmiliodeVillota Motorsport	10	(Spain) Alexander Toril	6
(Spain) EmiliodeVillota Motorsport	10	(Canada) Nelson Mason	8
(Spain) EmiliodeVillota Motorsport	11	(Japan) Yu Kanamaru	NC, All
(Spain) EmiliodeVillota Motorsport	12	(South Korea) Che-One Lim	NC, All
(Italy) BVM Racing	15	(Austria) Christopher Höher	4–7
(Italy) BVM Racing	15	(Italy) Michele Beretta	8
(Italy) BVM Racing	16	(Italy) Damiano Fioravanti	7–8
(Italy) DAV Racing	18	(United Kingdom) Hector Hurst	NC
(Italy) DAV Racing	18	(Italy) Leonardo Pulcini	6, 8
(Italy) DAV Racing	19	(Brazil) Henrique Baptista	NC, All
(Italy) DAV Racing	25	(Italy) Kevin Giovesi	NC
(Italy) DAV Racing	25	(Italy) Tommaso Menchini	1
(Italy) DAV Racing	25	(Mexico) Gerardo Nieto	2–4
(Italy) DAV Racing	25	(Italy) Costantino Peroni	6–7
(Italy) DAV Racing	26	(Italy) Kevin Giovesi	7
(Italy) DAV Racing	29	(Spain) Igor Urien	8
(Spain) Campos Racing	20	(Russia) Konstantin Tereshchenko	All
(Spain) Campos Racing	21	(United Kingdom) Sean Walkinshaw	NC, All
(Spain) Campos Racing	22	(Spain) Álex Palou	NC, All
(Italy) Corbetta Competizioni	23	(Italy) Damiano Fioravanti	1–2
(Italy) Corbetta Competizioni	23	(Italy) Costantino Peroni	3
(Italy) Corbetta Competizioni	23	(Italy) Alessio Rovera	8
(Italy) Corbetta Competizioni	28	(Colombia) William Barbosa	1–4, 6–8
Championship Cup Class
(Italy) RP Motorsport	30	(Saudi Arabia) Saud Al Faisal	NC, 1
(Italy) RP Motorsport	31	(Italy) Costantino Peroni	NC, 1–2
(United Kingdom) Team West-Tec F3	33	(Macau) Wing Chung Chang	NC
(United Kingdom) Team West-Tec F3	88	(Hong Kong) Wei Fung Thong	NC

== Race calendar and results ==
- An eight-round provisional calendar was revealed on 6 November 2013. The calendar was altered on 23 January 2014. All rounds supported the International GT Open series. Rounds denoted with a blue background were a part of the Spanish Formula Three Championship.

Round		Circuit	Date	Pole position	Fastest lap	Winning driver	Winning team	Cup Winner
NC	R1	(France) Circuit Paul Ricard	1 March	(Thailand) Sandy Stuvik	(Thailand) Sandy Stuvik	(Thailand) Sandy Stuvik	(Italy) RP Motorsport	(Hong Kong) Wei Fung Thong
1	R1	(Germany) Nürburgring	3 May	(Spain) Álex Palou	(Spain) Álex Palou	(Spain) Álex Palou	(Spain) Campos Racing	(Italy) Costantino Peroni
1	R2	(Germany) Nürburgring	4 May	(Thailand) Sandy Stuvik	(Japan) Yu Kanamaru	(Thailand) Sandy Stuvik	(Italy) RP Motorsport	(Saudi Arabia) Saud Al Faisal
2	R1	(Portugal) Autódromo Internacional do Algarve, Portimão	7 June	(Thailand) Sandy Stuvik	(Thailand) Sandy Stuvik	(Poland) Artur Janosz	(Italy) RP Motorsport	(Italy) Costantino Peroni
2	R2	(Portugal) Autódromo Internacional do Algarve, Portimão	8 June	(Thailand) Sandy Stuvik	(Japan) Yu Kanamaru	(Thailand) Sandy Stuvik	(Italy) RP Motorsport	(Italy) Costantino Peroni
3	R1	(Spain) Circuito de Jerez	21 June	(Thailand) Sandy Stuvik	(Poland) Artur Janosz	(Thailand) Sandy Stuvik	(Italy) RP Motorsport	No competitors
3	R2	(Spain) Circuito de Jerez	22 June	(Poland) Artur Janosz	(Poland) Artur Janosz	(Thailand) Sandy Stuvik	(Italy) RP Motorsport	No competitors
4	R1	(Hungary) Hungaroring	5 July	(Poland) Artur Janosz	(Poland) Artur Janosz	(Poland) Artur Janosz	(Italy) RP Motorsport	No competitors
4	R2	(Hungary) Hungaroring	6 July	(Poland) Artur Janosz	(Spain) Álex Palou	(Spain) Álex Palou	(Spain) Campos Racing	No competitors
5	R1	(United Kingdom) Silverstone Circuit	19 July	(Spain) Álex Palou	(Thailand) Sandy Stuvik	(Thailand) Sandy Stuvik	(Italy) RP Motorsport	No competitors
5	R2	(United Kingdom) Silverstone Circuit	20 July	(Thailand) Sandy Stuvik	(Thailand) Sandy Stuvik	(Thailand) Sandy Stuvik	(Italy) RP Motorsport	No competitors
6	R1	(Belgium) Circuit de Spa-Francorchamps	6 September	(Thailand) Sandy Stuvik	(Poland) Artur Janosz	(Thailand) Sandy Stuvik	(Italy) RP Motorsport	No competitors
6	R2	(Belgium) Circuit de Spa-Francorchamps	7 September	(Thailand) Sandy Stuvik	(Thailand) Sandy Stuvik	(Thailand) Sandy Stuvik	(Italy) RP Motorsport	No competitors
7	R1	(Italy) Autodromo Nazionale Monza	27 September	(Thailand) Sandy Stuvik	(Poland) Artur Janosz (Note: Fastest lap recorded by Kevin Giovesi, but he was ineligible to score the fastest lap point.)	(Thailand) Sandy Stuvik	(Italy) RP Motorsport	No competitors
7	R2	(Italy) Autodromo Nazionale Monza	28 September	(Thailand) Sandy Stuvik	(Spain) Álex Palou	(Thailand) Sandy Stuvik	(Italy) RP Motorsport	No competitors
8	R1	(Spain) Circuit de Barcelona-Catalunya	1 November	(Thailand) Sandy Stuvik	(Thailand) Sandy Stuvik	(Thailand) Sandy Stuvik	(Italy) RP Motorsport	No competitors
8	R2	(Spain) Circuit de Barcelona-Catalunya	2 November	(Spain) Álex Palou	(Spain) Álex Palou	(Spain) Álex Palou	(Spain) Campos Racing	No competitors

== Championship standings ==
=== Euroformula Open Championship ===
==== Drivers' championship ====
- Points were awarded as follows:

1	2	3	4	5	6	7	8	9	10	PP	FL
25	18	15	12	10	8	6	4	2	1	**1**	1

Pos	Driver	LEC (France)	NÜR (Germany)		ALG (Portugal)		JER (Spain)		HUN (Hungary)		SIL (United Kingdom)		SPA (Belgium)		MNZ (Italy)		CAT (Spain)		Pts
1	(Thailand) Sandy Stuvik	**1**	2	**1**	**12**	**1**	**1**	1	4	Ret	1	**1**	**1**	**1**	**1**	**1**	**1**	5	332
2	(Poland) Artur Janosz	Ret	4	2	1	2	2	**Ret**	**1**	**2**	5	5	14	2	2	2	4	4	243
3	(Spain) Álex Palou	6	**1**	Ret	3	3	4	2	2	1	**2**	2	2	5	Ret	16	2	**1**	242
4	(Japan) Yu Kanamaru	3	3	16	2	16	6	12	13	5	4	4	10	3	3	14	5	6	128
5	(Israel) Yarin Stern	8	7	Ret	Ret	17	3	3	Ret	7	3	3	Ret	4	7	Ret	3	3	125
6	(Russia) Konstantin Tereshchenko		8	7	5	7	5	11	12	3	6	8	13	Ret	5	17	16	16	75
7	(Thailand) Tanart Sathienthirakul	WD	5	4	6	9	9	Ret	11	14	10	7	5	Ret	10	8	8	9	69
8	(Guatemala) Andrés Saravia		13	8	Ret	Ret	8	10	3	6	Ret	6	11	6	15	6	11	12	61
9	(United Kingdom) Cameron Twynham	5	6	3	4	6	11	5	Ret	13									53
10	(United Kingdom) Sean Walkinshaw	11	11	11	7	12	10	7	5	10	7	12	8	10	6	9	9	Ret	53
11	(Russia) John Simonyan	12	Ret	18	Ret	Ret	16	4	9	Ret	12	10	3	16	Ret	13	Ret	7	38
12	(Germany) Nicolas Pohler	10	Ret	9	Ret	8	7	6	Ret	8	Ret	9	7	13	8	Ret			38
13	(Austria) Christopher Höher	7							Ret	4	Ret	15	6	15	14	3			35
14	(South Korea) Che One Lim	9	17	5	Ret	5	12	Ret	Ret	Ret	9	13	Ret	8	Ret	7	13	Ret	35
15	(Mexico) Gerardo Nieto				8	4	14	9	7	9									26
16	(Italy) Damiano Fioravanti		12	6	Ret	13									9	5	20	11	26
17	(Spain) Alexander Toril												4	7					18
18	(Hong Kong) Wei Fung Thong	14	10	10	9	11	13	8	8	Ret	8	Ret	Ret	12	17	Ret	15	17	16
19	(Italy) Leonardo Pulcini												DNS	DNS			7	8	14
20	(Brazil) Henrique Baptista	13	15	13	Ret	10	17	Ret	6	12	Ret	11	12	14	11	11	18	Ret	11
21	(Saudi Arabia) Saud Al Faisal	18	Ret	14	10	Ret	19	Ret	10	Ret	11	14	9	9	13	15	19	19	6
22	(Spain) Igor Urien		9	12													Ret	15	2
23	(Italy) Costantino Peroni	16	16	15	11	14	15	13					Ret	11	12	10			2
24	(Colombia) William Barbosa		14	Ret	Ret	15	18	Ret	14	11			Ret	Ret	16	12	17	18	0
25	(Italy) Tommaso Menchini		Ret	17															0
Guest drivers ineligible to score points
	(Canada) Nelson Mason																12	2	0
	(Italy) Kevin Giovesi	2													4	4			0
	(Italy) Alessio Rovera																6	Ret	0
	(Germany) Fabian Schiller																10	13	0
	(Italy) Michele Beretta																Ret	10	0
	(Poland) Igor Waliłko																14	14	0
Non-championship round-only drivers
	(Colombia) Tatiana Calderon	4																	0
	(United Kingdom) Hector Hurst	15																	0
	(Macau) Wing Chung Chang	17																	0
Pos	Driver	LEC (France)	NÜR (Germany)		ALG (Portugal)		JER (Spain)		HUN (Hungary)		SIL (United Kingdom)		SPA (Belgium)		MNZ (Italy)		CAT (Spain)		Pts

Colour	Result
Gold	Winner
Silver	Second place
Bronze	Third place
Green	Points classification
Blue	Non-points classification
Blue	Non-classified finish (NC)
Purple	Retired, not classified (Ret)
Red	Did not qualify (DNQ)
Red	Did not pre-qualify (DNPQ)
Black	Disqualified (DSQ)
White	Did not start (DNS)
White	Withdrew (WD)
White	Race cancelled (C)
Blank	Did not practice (DNP)
Blank	Did not arrive (DNA)
Blank	Excluded (EX)

**Bold** – Pole
Italics – Fastest Lap

==== Championship Cup ====
- Points were awarded as follows:

1	2	3	4	5
10	8	6	4	3

Pos	Driver	LEC (France)	NÜR (Germany)		ALG (Portugal)		JER (Spain)	HUN (Hungary)	SIL (United Kingdom)	SPA (Belgium)	MNZ (Italy)	CAT (Spain)	Pts
1	(Italy) Costantino Peroni	16	16	15	11	14							38
2	(Saudi Arabia) Saud Al Faisal	18	Ret	14									10
Non-championship round-only drivers
–	(Hong Kong) Wei Fung Thong	14											–
–	(Macau) Wing Chung Chang	17											–
Pos	Driver	LEC (France)	NÜR (Germany)		ALG (Portugal)		JER (Spain)	HUN (Hungary)	SIL (United Kingdom)	SPA (Belgium)	MNZ (Italy)	CAT (Spain)	Pts

==== Teams' championship ====
- Points were awarded as follows:

1	2	3	4	5
10	8	6	4	3

Pos	Team	LEC (France)	NÜR (Germany)		ALG (Portugal)		JER (Spain)		HUN (Hungary)		SIL (United Kingdom)		SPA (Belgium)		MNZ (Italy)		CAT (Spain)		Pts
1	(Italy) RP Motorsport	1	2	1	1	1	1	1	1	2	1	1	1	1	1	1	1	4	152
2	(Spain) Campos Racing	6	1	7	3	3	4	2	2	1	2	2	2	5	5	9	2	1	101
3	(United Kingdom) Team West-Tec F3	5	5	3	4	6	3	3	8	7	3	3	5	4	7	8	3	3	58
4	(Spain) EmiliodeVillota Motorsport	3	3	5	2	5	6	12	13	5	4	4	4	3	3	7	5	6	53
5	(Italy) BVM Racing								Ret	4	Ret	15	6	15	9	3	20	10	10
6	(Italy) DAV Racing	2	15	13	8	4	14	9	6	9	Ret	11	12	11	4	4	7	8	4
7	(Italy) Corbetta Competizioni		12	6	11	13	15	13	14	11			Ret	Ret	16	12	6	18	0
Pos	Team	LEC (France)	NÜR (Germany)		ALG (Portugal)		JER (Spain)		HUN (Hungary)		SIL (United Kingdom)		SPA (Belgium)		MNZ (Italy)		CAT (Spain)		Pts

=== Spanish Formula Three Championship ===
==== Drivers' championship ====
- Points were awarded as follows:

1	2	3	4	5	6	7	8	9	10	PP	FL
25	18	15	12	10	8	6	4	2	1	**1**	1

Pos	Driver	ALG (Portugal)		JER (Spain)		CAT (Spain)		Pts
1	(Thailand) Sandy Stuvik	**12**	**1**	**1**	1	**1**	5	118
2	(Spain) Álex Palou	3	3	4	2	2	**1**	105
3	(Poland) Artur Janosz	1	2	2	**Ret**	4	4	91
4	(Israel) Yarin Stern	Ret	17	3	3	3	3	63
5	(Japan) Yu Kanamaru	2	16	6	12	5	6	47
6	(United Kingdom) Cameron Twynham	4	6	11	5			30
7	(Russia) Konstantin Tereshchenko	5	7	5	11	16	16	27
8	(Thailand) Tanart Sathienthirakul	6	9	9	Ret	8	9	26
9	(Russia) Dzhon Simonyan	Ret	Ret	16	4	Ret	7	20
10	(United Kingdom) Sean Walkinshaw	7	12	10	7	9	Ret	19
11	(Mexico) Gerardo Nieto	8	4	14	9			18
12	(Germany) Nicolas Pohler	Ret	8	7	6			18
13	(Guatemala) Andrés Saravia	Ret	Ret	8	10	11	12	13
14	(South Korea) Che One Lim	Ret	5	12	Ret	13	Ret	12
15	(Hong Kong) Wei Fung Thong	9	11	13	8	15	17	7
16	(Spain) Igor Urien					Ret	15	2
17	(Brazil) Henrique Baptista	Ret	10	17	Ret	18	Ret	1
18	(Saudi Arabia) Saud Al Faisal	10	Ret	19	Ret	19	19	1
19	(Italy) Costantino Peroni	11	14	15	13			0
20	(Colombia) William Barbosa	Ret	15	18	Ret	17	18	0
Guest drivers ineligible to score points
	(Canada) Nelson Mason					12	2	
	(Italy) Alessio Rovera					6	Ret	
	(Italy) Leonardo Pulcini					7	8	
	(Germany) Fabian Schiller					10	13	
	(Italy) Michele Beretta					Ret	10	
	(Italy) Damiano Fioravanti	Ret	13			20	11	
	(Poland) Igor Waliłko					14	14	
Pos	Driver	ALG (Portugal)		JER (Spain)		CAT (Spain)		Pts

Colour	Result
Gold	Winner
Silver	Second place
Bronze	Third place
Green	Points classification
Blue	Non-points classification
Blue	Non-classified finish (NC)
Purple	Retired, not classified (Ret)
Red	Did not qualify (DNQ)
Red	Did not pre-qualify (DNPQ)
Black	Disqualified (DSQ)
White	Did not start (DNS)
White	Withdrew (WD)
White	Race cancelled (C)
Blank	Did not practice (DNP)
Blank	Did not arrive (DNA)
Blank	Excluded (EX)

**Bold** – Pole
Italics – Fastest Lap

==== Championship Cup ====
- Points were awarded as follows:

1	2	3	4	5
10	8	6	4	3

Pos	Driver	ALG (Portugal)		JER (Spain)	CAT (Spain)	Pts
1	(Italy) Costantino Peroni	11	14			20

==== Teams' championship ====
- Points were awarded as follows:

1	2	3	4	5
10	8	6	4	3

Pos	Team	ALG (Portugal)		JER (Spain)		CAT (Spain)		Pts
1	(Italy) RP Motorsport	1	1	1	1	1	4	56
2	(Spain) Campos Racing	3	3	4	2	2	1	42
3	(United Kingdom) Team West-Tec F3	4	6	3	3	3	3	30
4	(Spain) EmiliodeVillota Motorsport	2	5	6	12	5	6	17
5	(Italy) DAV Racing	8	4	14	9	7	8	4
6	(Italy) Corbetta Competizioni	11	13	15	13	6	18	0
7	(Italy) BVM Racing					20	10	0
Pos	Team	ALG (Portugal)		JER (Spain)		CAT (Spain)		Pts
