= Michele Beretta =

Italian racing driver (born 1994)

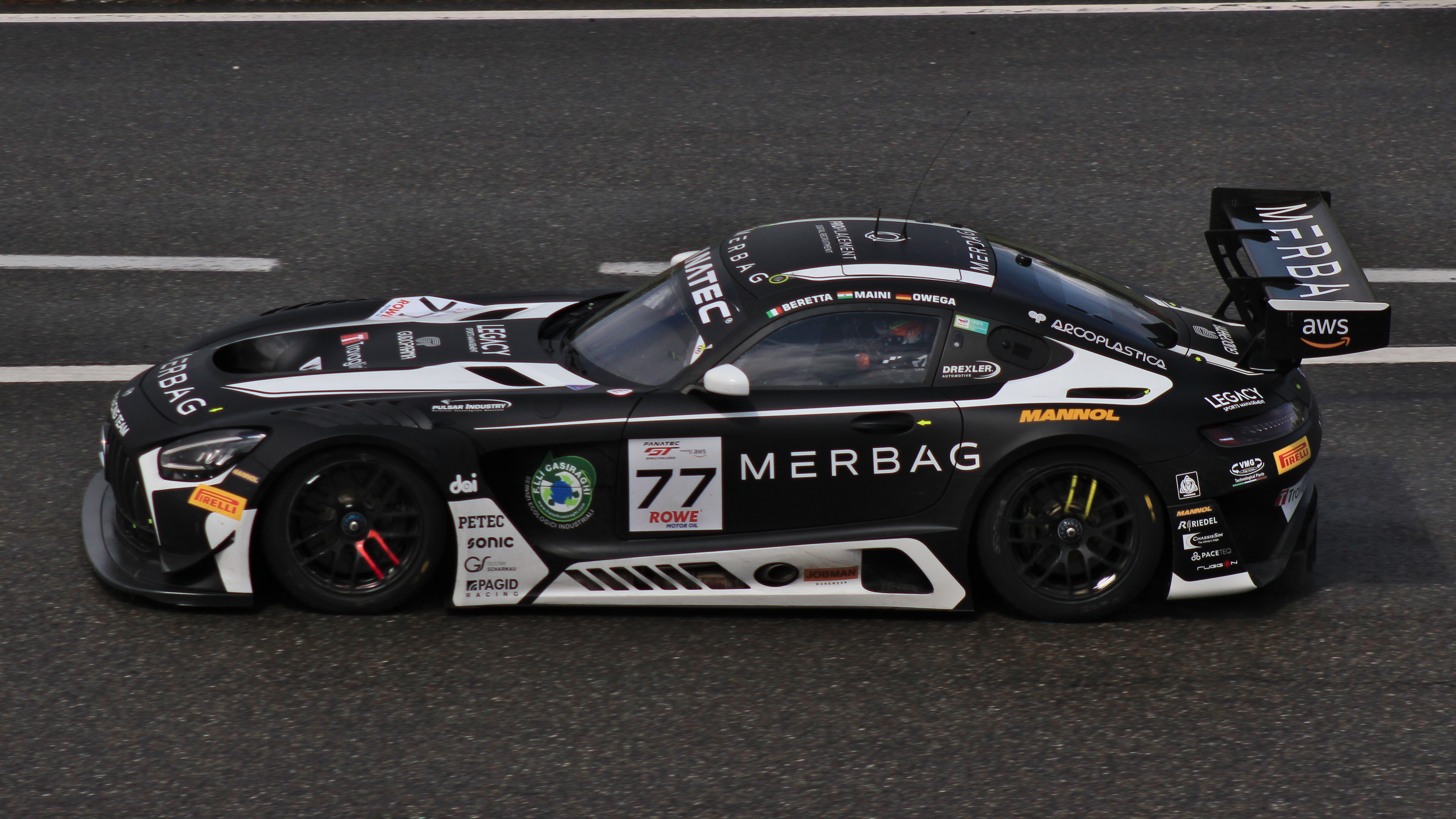
- Nationality: Italian
- Born: 22 October 1994 (age 32) Milan, Lombardy

European Le Mans Series – GTE
- Categorisation: FIA Silver (2016–2022, 2025–); FIA Gold (2023–2024)
- Years active: 2020
- Teams: Proton Competition
- Starts: 3
- Wins: 1
- Poles: 1
- Fastest laps: 0

Previous series
- 2012–13 2014–15 2015 2016–19 2016 2017 2018–19: Formula Abarth; FIA Formula 3 European Championship; GP3 Series; Blancpain Endurance Series; Blancpain Sprint Series; Italian GT Championship; ADAC GT Masters

Michele Beretta (born 22 October 1994 in Milan) is a racing driver from Italy. He currently competes in the European Le Mans Series.

== Career ==
In 2023, Beretta returned to the GT World Challenge Europe Endurance Cup, taking part in the Gold Cup class in an Iron Lynx Lamborghini alongside Rolf Ineichen and Leonardo Pulcini.

== Racing record ==
=== Career summary ===
Season	Series	Team	Races	Wins	Poles	F/Laps	Podiums	Points	Position
2012	Formula Abarth	Cram Competition	18	0	0	0	0	31	11th
2013	Formula Abarth	Euronova Racing by Fortec	18	1	1	1	9	168	**2nd**
2014	FIA Formula 3 European Championship	EuroInternational	33	0	0	0	0	0	28th
2014	Euroformula Open Championship	BVM Racing	2	0	0	0	0	0	NC†
2015	FIA Formula 3 European Championship	kfzteile24 Mücke Motorsport	32	0	0	0	0	4	22nd
2015	GP3 Series	Trident	6	0	0	0	0	0	27th
2016	Blancpain GT Series Endurance Cup	GRT Grasser Racing Team	5	0	1	0	0	15	27th
2016	Blancpain GT Series Sprint Cup	GRT Grasser Racing Team	10	0	0	0	0	7	22nd
2016	ADAC GT Masters	GRT Grasser Racing Team	2	0	0	0	0	0	67th
2016	British GT Championship - GT3	GRT Grasser Racing Team	1	0	0	0	0	0	25th
2017	Blancpain GT Series Endurance Cup	Ombra Racing	5	0	0	0	0	0	68th
2017	Italian GT Championship - GT3 Pro	Ombra Racing	14	4	0	3	7	161	**1st**
2017	IMSA SportsCar Championship - GTD	GRT Grasser Racing Team	1	0	0	0	0	33	54th
2017	IMSA SportsCar Championship - GTD	EBIMOTORS	1	0	0	0	0	33	54th
2017	Lamborghini Super Trofeo North America	Prestige Performance	10	0	0	0	4	72	**3rd**
2018	Blancpain GT Series Endurance Cup	Barwell Motorsport	5	0	0	0	0	0	60th
2018	ADAC GT Masters	Team Rosberg	13	0	0	0	0	6	37th
2019	Blancpain GT Series Endurance Cup	Orange1 FFF Racing Team	5	0	0	0	0	1	34th
2019	Blancpain GT World Challenge Europe	GRT Grasser Racing Team	2	0	0	0	0	0	NC
2019	ADAC GT Masters	Orange1 by GRT Grasser	12	0	0	0	1	60	18th
2020	European Le Mans Series - GTE	Proton Competition	5	2	0	0	4	99	**1st**
2020	24 Hours of Le Mans - GTE Am	Proton Competition	1	0	0	0	0	N/A	12th
2020	GT World Challenge Europe Endurance Cup	Haupt Racing Team	2	0	0	0	0	0	52nd
2020	24 Hours of Nürburgring - SP9	Phoenix Racing	1	0	0	0	0	N/A	DNF
2021	WeatherTech SportsCar Championship - GTD	GRT Grasser Racing Team	1	0	0	0	0	208	64th
2021	GT World Challenge Europe Endurance Cup	Haupt Racing Team	2	0	0	0	0	0	NC
2021	International GT Open	Vincenzo Sospiri Racing	14	4	1	2	11	146	**1st**
2021	24 Hours of Nürburgring - SP9	Phoenix Racing	1	0	0	0	0	N/A	16th
2022	GT World Challenge Europe Endurance Cup	Vincenzo Sospiri Racing	5	0	0	0	0	0	NC
2022	Italian GT Endurance Championship - GT3 Pro	Vincenzo Sospiri Racing	3	1	0	1	2	42	**2nd**
2022	Intercontinental GT Challenge	Vincenzo Sospiri Racing	1	0	0	0	0	NC	0
2022	Intercontinental GT Challenge	K-PAX Racing	1	0	0	0	0	NC	0
2022	GT World Challenge America - Pro	K-PAX Racing	11	6	5	3	9	213	**3rd**
2022	GT World Challenge America - Pro/Am	TR3 Racing	2	0	0	0	0	14	15th
2022	24 Hours of Nürburgring - SP9	Scherer Sport Team Phoenix	1	0	0	0	0	N/A	5th
2023	GT World Challenge Europe Endurance Cup	Iron Lynx	5	0	0	0	0	0	NC
2023	GT World Challenge Europe Endurance Cup - Gold	Iron Lynx	5	0	1	0	1	44	8th
2023	24 Hours of Nürburgring - SP9	Scherer Sport PHX	1	0	0	0	0	N/A	11th
2024	GT World Challenge Europe Endurance Cup	Haupt Racing Team	5	0	0	0	0	0	NC
2024	Nürburgring Langstrecken-Serie - SP9	Mercedes-AMG Team Bilstein by HRT							
2024	Nürburgring Langstrecken-Serie - SP9	Team Advan x HRT							
2024	Intercontinental GT Challenge	Mercedes-AMG Team Bilstein by HRT							
2024	24 Hours of Nürburgring - SP9	Mercedes-AMG Team Bilstein by HRT							
2025	GT World Challenge Europe Endurance Cup	VSR	5	0	0	0	0	0	NC
2025	Italian GT Championship Endurance Cup - GT3	VSR	4	2	2	0	2	56	**3rd**
2026	Nürburgring Langstrecken-Serie - SP9	Dinamic GT							
2026	24 Hours of Nürburgring - SP9	Dinamic GT	1	0	0	0	0	0	DNF

^{†} As Beretta was a guest driver, he was ineligible to score points.

=== Complete Formula Abarth Championship results ===
(key) (Races in bold indicate pole position) (Races in italics indicate fastest lap)

Year	Team	1	2	3	4	5	6	7	8	9	10	11	12	13	14	15	16	17	18	19	20	21	22	23	24	DC	Points
2012	Cram Competition	VRT; 1	VRT; 2	VRT; 3	HUN; 1	HUN; 2	HUN; 3	MUG; 1; 10	MUG; 2 Ret	MUG; 3; 8	MIS; 1; 12	MIS; 2 Ret	MIS; 3 Ret	RBR; 1; 10	RBR; 2 Ret	RBR; 3; 8	IMO; 1; 8	IMO; 2 Ret	IMO; 3 Ret	VAL; 1 Ret	VAL; 2; 11	VAL; 3; 7	MNZ; 1; 7	MNZ; 2; 7	MNZ; 3; 5	NC	0
2013	Euronova Racing	VAL; 1; 2	VAL; 2; 3	VAL; 3; 2	ADR; 1; 12	ADR; 2; 12	ADR; 1; 7	MUG; 1; 3	MUG; 2; 2	MUG; 3; 1	IMO; 1 Ret	IMO; 2 Ret	IMO; 3; 2	MIS; 1; 2	MIS; 2; 10	MIS; 3 Ret	**MNZ**; 1; 2	MNZ; 2; 4	MNZ; 3; 5							2nd	168

*Ineligible for points.

=== Complete FIA Formula 3 European Championship results ===
(key) (Races in bold indicate pole position) (Races in italics indicate fastest lap)

Year	Entrant	Engine	1	2	3	4	5	6	7	8	9	10	11	12	13	14	15	16	17	18	19	20	21	22	23	24	25	26	27	28	29	30	31	32	33	DC	Points
2014	EuroInternational	Mercedes-Benz	SIL; 1 Ret	SIL; 2; 21	SIL; 3; 17	HOC; 1; 17	HOC; 2 Ret	HOC; 3; 21	PAU; 1 Ret	PAU; 2; 12	PAU; 3 Ret	HUN; 1 Ret	HUN; 2; 24	HUN; 3; 21	SPA; 1; 22	SPA; 2 Ret	SPA; 3; 19	NOR; 1 Ret	NOR; 2 Ret	NOR; 3; 19	MSC; 1; 20	MSC; 2 Ret	MSC; 3; 15	RBR; 1; 22	RBR; 2; 17	RBR; 3 Ret	NÜR; 1; 21	NÜR; 2; 18	NÜR; 3; 15	IMO; 1; 17	IMO; 2; 17	IMO; 3; 17	HOC; 1 Ret	HOC; 2 NC	HOC; 3; 14	28th	0
2015	Mücke Motorsport	Mercedes-Benz	SIL; 1; 24	SIL; 2 Ret	SIL; 3; 19	HOC; 1; 23	HOC; 2; 24	HOC; 3; 19	PAU; 1 Ret	PAU; 2 Ret	PAU; 3 Ret	MNZ; 1; 15	MNZ; 2 Ret	MNZ; 3 DNS	SPA; 1; 21	SPA; 2; 24	SPA; 3; 21	NOR; 1 Ret	NOR; 2 Ret	NOR; 3; 20	ZAN; 1; 18	ZAN; 2; 16	ZAN; 3; 15	RBR; 1; 22	RBR; 2; 30	RBR; 3; 18	ALG; 1; 27	ALG; 2; 20	ALG; 3; 14	NÜR; 1; 25	NÜR; 2; 24	NÜR; 3; 17	HOC; 1; 14	HOC; 2; 20	HOC; 3; 9	22nd	4

=== Complete GP3 Series results ===
(key) (Races in bold indicate pole position) (Races in italics indicate fastest lap)

Year	Entrant	1	2	3	4	5	6	7	8	9	10	11	12	13	14	15	16	17	18	Pos	Points
2015	Trident Racing	CAT; FEA	CAT; SPR	RBR; FEA	RBR; SPR	SIL; FEA	SIL; SPR	HUN; FEA	HUN; SPR	SPA; FEA	SPA; SPR	MNZ; FEA	MNZ; SPR	SOC; FEA; 18	SOC; SPR; 13	BHR; FEA; 20	BHR; SPR; 15	YMC; FEA; 20	YMC; SPR; 18	27th	0

=== Complete GT World Challenge Europe results ===
==== GT World Challenge Europe Endurance Cup ====
(key) (Races in bold indicate pole position) (Races in italics indicate fastest lap)

Year	Team	Car	Class	1	2	3	4	5	6	7	Pos.	Points
2016	GRT Grasser Racing Team	Lamborghini Huracán GT3	Pro	MON; 40	SIL; 21	LEC; 40	SPA; 6H; 4	SPA; 12H; 24	SPA; 24H; 15	**NÜR**; 6	27th	15
2017	Ombra Racing	Lamborghini Huracán GT3	Pro	MNZ; 22	SIL; 15	LEC; Ret	SPA; 6H; 35	SPA; 12H; 24	SPA; 24H; 16	CAT; 23	NC	0
2018	Barwell Motorsport	Lamborghini Huracán GT3	Silver	MON; Ret	SIL; 40	LEC; 14	SPA; 6H; 26	SPA; 12H; 24	SPA; 24H; 19	CAT; 18	3rd	92
2019	Orange 1 FFF Racing Team	Lamborghini Huracán GT3 Evo	Silver	MNZ; 10	SIL; Ret	LEC; 17	SPA; 6H; 61	SPA; 12H; 52	SPA; 24H; Ret	CAT; 21	11th	32
2020	Haupt Racing Team	Mercedes-AMG GT3 Evo	Silver	IMO	NÜR	SPA; 6H; 20	SPA; 12H; 20	SPA; 24H; 18	LEC; 17		3rd	65
2021	Haupt Racing Team	Mercedes-AMG GT3 Evo	Silver	MNZ	LEC	SPA; 6H; 54	SPA; 12H; 54	SPA; 24H; Ret	NÜR; 14	CAT	28th	10
2022	Vincenzo Sospiri Racing	Lamborghini Huracán GT3 Evo	Silver	IMO; 24	LEC; Ret	SPA; 6H; 34	SPA; 12H; 25	SPA; 24H; 35	HOC; 25	CAT; 18	12th	28
2023	Iron Lynx	Lamborghini Huracán GT3 Evo 2	Gold	MNZ; Ret	LEC; 34	SPA; 6H; 30	SPA; 12H; 48	SPA; 24H; Ret	NÜR; 12	**CAT**; Ret	8th	44
2024	Haupt Racing Team	Mercedes-AMG GT3 Evo	Gold	LEC; 47	SPA; 6H; 47	SPA; 12H; 40	SPA; 24H; 17	NÜR; 19	MNZ; 22	JED; 34	3rd	95
2025	VSR	Lamborghini Huracán GT3 Evo 2	Silver	**LEC**; 25	MNZ; 35	SPA; 6H; 70†	SPA; 12H; 70†	SPA; 24H; Ret	NÜR; 51	CAT; 42	28th	12

==== GT World Challenge Europe Sprint Cup ====
(key) (Races in bold indicate pole position) (Races in italics indicate fastest lap)

Year	Team	Car	Class	1	2	3	4	5	6	7	8	9	10	Pos.	Points
2016	GRT Grasser Racing Team	Lamborghini Huracán GT3	Silver	MIS; QR; 16	MIS; MR; 23	**BRH**; **QR**; 23	BRH; MR; 10	**NÜR**; **QR**; 15	NÜR; MR; 13	HUN; QR; 26	HUN; MR; 20	CAT; QR; 12	CAT; MR; 7	1st	125
2019	GRT Grasser Racing Team	Lamborghini Huracán GT3 Evo	Silver	BRH; 1	BRH; 2	MIS; 1	MIS; 2	ZAN; 1; 19	ZAN; 2; 17	NÜR; 1	NÜR; 2	HUN; 1	HUN; 2	10th	9

=== Complete ADAC GT Masters results ===
(key) (Races in bold indicate pole position) (Races in italics indicate fastest lap)

Year	Team	Car	1	2	3	4	5	6	7	8	9	10	11	12	13	14	Pos.	Points
2016	GRT Grasser Racing Team	Lamborghini Huracán GT3	OSC; 1	OSC; 2	SAC; 1	SAC; 2	LAU; 1	LAU; 2	RBR; 1; 14	RBR; 2; 19	NÜR; 1	NÜR; 2	ZAN; 1	ZAN; 2	HOC; 1	HOC; 2	NC	0
2018	Team Rosberg	Lamborghini Huracán GT3	OSC; 1; 29	OSC; 2; 25	MST; 1; 22	MST; 2 DNS	RBR; 1; 30	RBR; 2; 15	NÜR; 1; 8	NÜR; 2; 20	ZAN; 1; 19	ZAN; 2; 26	SAC; 1; 9	SAC; 2; 25	HOC; 1; 25	HOC; 2; 17	37th	6
2019	Orange1 by GRT Grasser	Lamborghini Huracán GT3 Evo	OSC; 1; 15	OSC; 2; 5	MST; 1; 18	MST; 2; 11	RBR; 1; 21	RBR; 2; 12	ZAN; 1; 3	ZAN; 2; 7	NÜR; 1; 22	NÜR; 2; 6	HOC; 1; 14	HOC; 2; 22	SAC; 1	SAC; 2	18th	60

=== Complete IMSA SportsCar Championship results ===
(key) (Races in bold indicate pole position) (Races in italics indicate fastest lap)

Year	Team	Class	Car	Engine	1	2	3	4	5	6	7	8	9	10	11	12	Pos.	Points
2017	GRT Grasser Racing Team	GTD	Lamborghini Huracán GT3	Lamborghini 5.2 L V10	DAY; 17												54th	33
2017	EBIMOTORS	GTD	Lamborghini Huracán GT3	Lamborghini 5.2 L V10		SEB; 12	LBH	COA	DET	WGL	MOS	LIM	ELK	VIR	LGA	PET	54th	33
2021	GRT Grasser Racing Team	GTD	Lamborghini Huracán GT3 Evo	Lamborghini 5.2 L V10	DAY	SEB	MOH	DET	WGL	WGL	LIM	ELK	LGA	LBH	VIR	PET; 13	64th	208

=== Complete European Le Mans Series results ===
(key) (Races in bold indicate pole position) (Races in italics indicate fastest lap)

Year	Entrant	Class	Car	Engine	1	2	3	4	5	Pos.	Points
2020	Proton Competition	LMGTE	Porsche 911 RSR	Porsche 4.0 L Flat-6	RIC; 1	SPA; 6	**LEC**; 2	MNZ; 2	POR; 1	**1st**	**99**

=== Complete 24 Hours of Le Mans results ===
Year	Team	Co-Drivers	Car	Class	Laps	Pos.	Class Pos.
2020	(Germany) Proton Competition	(Austria) Horst Felbermayr Jr. (Netherlands) Max van Splunteren	Porsche 911 RSR	GTE; Am	330	38th	12th

=== Complete International GT Open results ===
(key) (Races in bold indicate pole position; results in italics indicate fastest lap)

Year	Entrant	Class	Chassis	1	2	3	4	5	6	7	8	9	10	11	12	13	14	Rank	Points
2021	Vincenzo Sospiri Racing	Pro	Lamborghini Huracán GT3 Evo	LEC; 1; 3	LEC; 2; 1	SPA; 1; 4	SPA; 2; 4	HUN; 1; 1	HUN; 2; 1	IMO; 1; 2	IMO; 2; 2	RBR; 1; 1	RBR; 2; 3	**MNZ**; **1**; 2	MNZ; 2; 3	CAT; 1; 5	CAT; 2; 2	1st	146
