= Sandy Stuvik =

Thai racecar driver (born 1995)

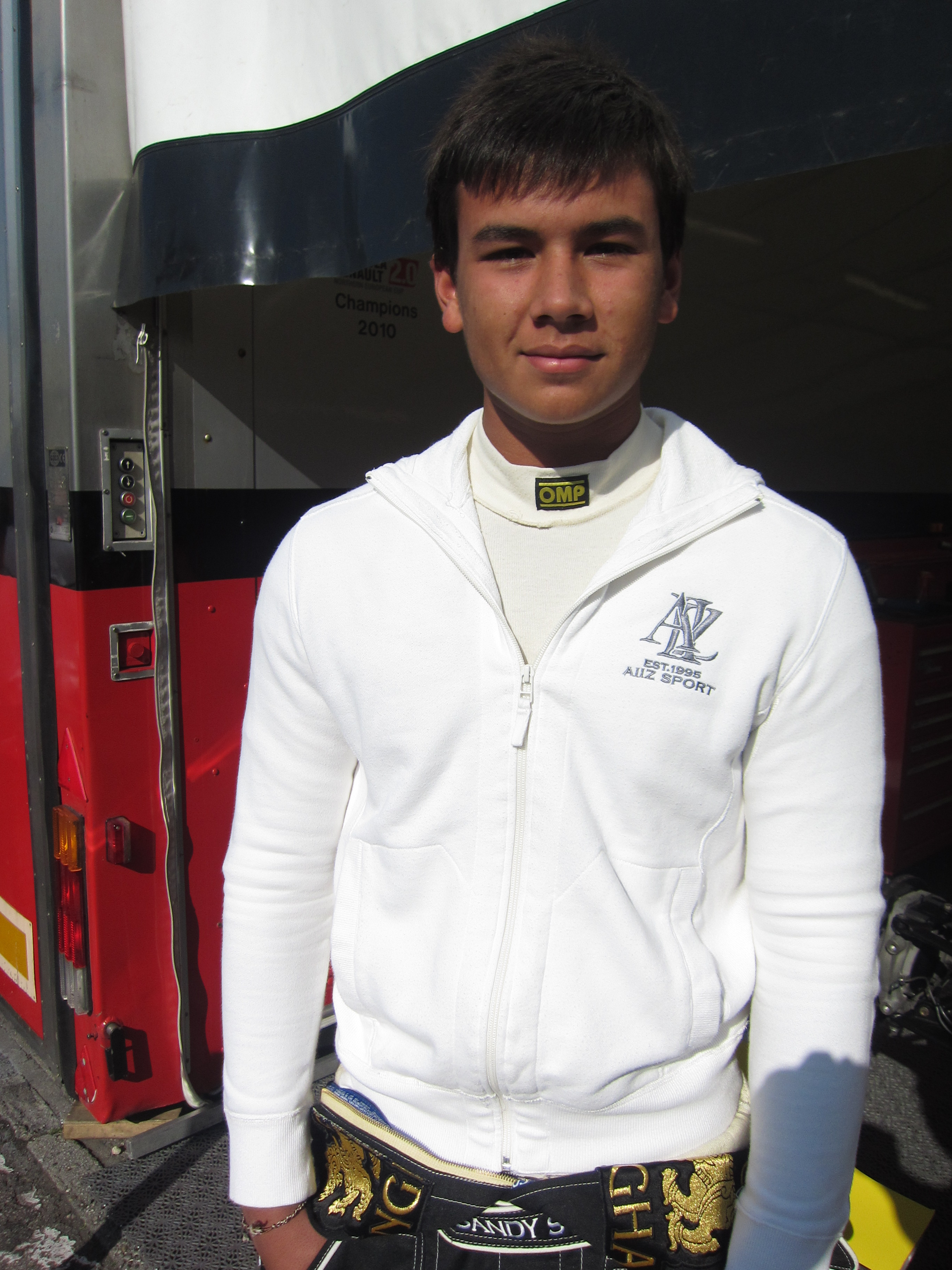
- Stuvik in 2011
- Nationality: (Thailand) Thai
- Born: Sandy Nicholas Stuvik; 11 April 1995 (age 31) Phuket, Thailand

GP3 Series career
- Debut season: 2015
- Categorisation: FIA Silver
- Car number: 8
- Former teams: Status Grand Prix, Trident
- Starts: 36
- Wins: 0
- Poles: 0
- Fastest laps: 0
- Best finish: 17th in 2015

Previous series
- 2013-2014 2011–12 2011 2010: Euroformula Open Championship; Formula Renault 2.0 NEC; Eurocup Formula Renault 2.0; Asian Formula Renault Challenge

Championship titles
- 2014 2010 2010: Euroformula Open Championship; Asian Formula Renault Challenge; FR2.0 Asia Winter Cup

Sandy Nicholas Stuvik (Thai: แซนดี้ นิโคลัส สตูวิค; born 11 April 1995), also referred to as Sandy Kraokaew Stuvik, is a Thai-Norwegian racing driver.

== Career ==
=== Karting ===
Born in Phuket to a Norwegian father, Martin Stuvik, and a Thai mother. Stuvik began karting in 2002 in the local karting championships. He progressed to the Rotax Max Junior category by 2008, continuing to compete in local karting championships.

=== Formula Renault ===
In 2010, Stuvik moved into open-wheel racing, competing in the Asian Formula Renault Challenge with the Asia Racing Team. He finished every race of the season on the podium, including four wins, and clinched the championship title. He also won the series' Winter Cup.

Stuvik moved to Europe in 2011, joining KEO Racing for Eurocup Formula Renault 2.0. He finished 28th, without scoring a point. He also competed in two rounds of the Formula Renault 2.0 Northern European Cup.

For the next year, Stuvik concentrated on the Northern European Cup. He had fourteen point-scoring finishes in twenty races on his way to fourteenth position in the series standings.

=== Euroformula Open ===
Stuvik graduated to the European F3 Open Championship, with RP Motorsport, in 2013. He finished every race of the season in the top-five. He battled with Ed Jones for the title, but due to dropped points he finished as runner-up.

Stuvik remained in the series, now renamed as the Euroformula Open Championship, with RP Motorsport. He dominated the championship, winning ten out of fourteen races, and clinched the championship with a round to spare.

=== GP3 Series ===
In 2015, Stuvik moved up to GP3 with Status Grand Prix.

=== Thailand Super Series ===
Following his transition from European open-wheel racing, Stuvik shifted his focus to GT racing in Asia full-time for the 2019 season. He signed with B-Quik Absolute Racing to compete in the Thailand Super Series' premier category, the TSS Supercar GT3. In his debut season, Stuvik secured his first GT3 Drivers' Championship piloting an Audi R8 LMS GT3. He successfully defended his crown during the pandemic-shortened 2020 season. Partnering with Australian co-driver Daniel Bilski, Stuvik clinched his consecutive title following a dominant double-win performance at the season finale held at the Chang International Circuit in Buriram. After finishing as runner-up in 2021, Stuvik reclaimed the top spot in 2022. Competing as a solo driver in the upgraded Audi R8 LMS GT3 Evo II, he secured his third overall series title.

== Racing record ==
=== Career summary ===
Season	Series	Team	Races	Wins	Poles	F/Laps	Podiums	Points	Position
2010	Asian Formula Renault Challenge	Asia Racing Team	12	4	2	4	12	286	**1st**
2010	Asian Formula Renault Winter Cup	Asia Racing Team	2	1	2	2	2	50	**1st**
2011	Eurocup Formula Renault 2.0	KEO Racing	8	0	0	0	0	0	28th
2011	Eurocup Formula Renault 2.0	Interwetten.com Racing Team	6	0	0	0	0	0	28th
2011	Formula Renault 2.0 NEC	KEO Racing	5	0	0	0	0	39	27th
2012	Formula Renault 2.0 NEC	Interwetten.com Racing Team	20	0	0	0	0	140	14th
2013	European F3 Open	RP Motorsport	16	3	3	3	10	247	**2nd**
2014	Euroformula Open Championship	RP Motorsport	16	11	10	5	12	332	**1st**
2014	Spanish Formula 3 Championship	RP Motorsport	6	4	4	2	4	118	**1st**
2015	GP3 Series	Status Grand Prix	18	0	0	0	0	7	17th
2016	GP3 Series	Trident	18	0	0	0	0	9	18th
2017	Blancpain GT Series Asia - GT3	Vincenzo Sospiri Racing	11	0	2	0	1	67	6th
2018	Blancpain GT Series Asia - GT3	Craft-Bamboo Racing	12	0	0	0	1	43	16th
2018	Formula 4 South East Asia Championship	Meritus.GP	6	0	0	0	0	4	22nd
2022	GT World Challenge Asia - GT3	The Bend Motorsport Park	2	0	0	0	0	21	19th
2022	GT World Challenge Asia - GT3	Audi Sport Asia Team X Works	2	0	0	0	0	21	19th
2023	Italian GT Championship - GT3	Audi Sport Italia							
2025	TSS The Super Series - GT3	B-Quik Absolute Racing							
2026	TSS The Super Series - GT3	B-Quik Absolute Racing							
2026	GT World Challenge Asia	Absolute Racing	4	0	1	0	1	22	26th
2026	China GT Championship - GT3	Absolute Racing							

=== Complete Asian Formula Renault Challenge results ===
(key) (Races in bold indicate pole position) (Races in italics indicate fastest lap)

Year	Entrant	1	2	3	4	5	6	7	8	9	10	11	12	13	14	DC	Points
2010	Asia Racing Team	**ZHU**; **1**; 1	ZHU; 2; 2	ZHU; 1; 2	ZHU; 2; 2	CHE; 1; 2	CHE; 2; 2	**SHA**; **1**; 2	SHA; 2; 2	**ZHU**; **1**; 1	ZHU; 2; 3	ZHU; 1; 3	ZHU; 2; 1	ZHU; 1; 2	ZHU; 2; 1	1st	286

=== Complete Formula Renault 2.0 NEC results ===
(key) (Races in bold indicate pole position) (Races in italics indicate fastest lap)

Year	Entrant	1	2	3	4	5	6	7	8	9	10	11	12	13	14	15	16	17	18	19	20	DC	Points
2011	KEO Racing	HOC; 1; 16	HOC; 2; 9	HOC; 3 Ret	SPA; 1; 25	SPA; 2; 13	NÜR; 1	NÜR; 2	ASS; 1	ASS; 2	ASS; 3	OSC; 1	OSC; 2	ZAN; 1	ZAN; 2	MST; 1	MST; 2	MST; 3	MNZ; 1	MNZ; 2	MNZ; 3	27th	39
2012	Interwetten.com Racing Team	HOC; 1; 10	HOC; 2; 10	HOC; 3 Ret	NÜR; 1; 11	NÜR; 2 DNS	OSC; 1; 8	OSC; 2; 7	OSC; 3; 6	ASS; 1; 20	ASS; 2; 13	RBR; 1; 14	RBR; 2; 11	MST; 1; 7	MST; 2; 23	MST; 3; 22	ZAN; 1; 11	ZAN; 2 Ret	ZAN; 3; 10	SPA; 1; 16	SPA; 2; 23	14th	140

=== Complete Eurocup Formula Renault 2.0 results ===
(key) (Races in bold indicate pole position; races in italics indicate fastest lap)

Year	Entrant	1	2	3	4	5	6	7	8	9	10	11	12	13	14	DC	Points
2011	KEO Racing	ALC; 1; 11	ALC; 2; 18	SPA; 1; 25	SPA; 2; 13	NÜR; 1; 26	NÜR; 2 Ret	HUN; 1; 20	HUN; 2 Ret							28th	0
2011	Interwetten.com Racing Junior Team									SIL; 1; 19	SIL; 2; 22	LEC; 1; 23	LEC; 2 Ret	CAT; 1; 24	CAT; 2; 26	28th	0

=== Complete Euroformula Open Championship results ===
(key) (Races in bold indicate pole position) (Races in italics indicate fastest lap)

Year	Entrant	1	2	3	4	5	6	7	8	9	10	11	12	13	14	15	16	Pos	Points
2013	RP Motorsport	LEC; 1; 4	LEC; 2; 1	ALG; 1; 2	ALG; 2; 3	NÜR; 1; 2	NÜR; 2; 3	JER; 1; 5	JER; 2; 4	**SIL**; **1**; 5	SIL; 2; 2	**SPA**; **1**; 1	**SPA**; **2**; 2	MNZ; 1; 4	MNZ; 2; 1	CAT; 1; 5	CAT; 2; 2	2nd	247
2014	RP Motorsport	NÜR; 1; 2	**NÜR**; **2**; 1	**ALG**; **1**; 12	**ALG**; **2**; 1	**JER**; **1**; 1	JER; 2; 1	HUN; 1; 4	HUN; 2 Ret	SIL; 1; 1	**SIL**; **2**; 1	**SPA**; **1**; 1	**SPA**; **2**; 1	**MNZ**; **1**; 1	**MNZ**; **2**; 1	**CAT**; **1**; 1	CAT; 2; 5	1st	332

=== Complete GP3 Series results ===
(key) (Races in bold indicate pole position) (Races in italics indicate fastest lap)

Year	Entrant	1	2	3	4	5	6	7	8	9	10	11	12	13	14	15	16	17	18	Pos	Points
2015	Status Grand Prix	CAT; FEA; 18	CAT; SPR; 17	RBR; FEA; 7	RBR; SPR; Ret	SIL; FEA; 20	SIL; SPR; 20	HUN; FEA; 22	HUN; SPR; 14	SPA; FEA; Ret	SPA; SPR; 17	MNZ; FEA; 11	MNZ; SPR; 8	SOC; FEA; 16	SOC; SPR; 17	BHR; FEA; 13	BHR; SPR; Ret	YMC; FEA; 17	YMC; SPR; 16	17th	7
2016	Trident	CAT; FEA; 18	CAT; SPR; 15	RBR; FEA; 10	RBR; SPR; 8	SIL; FEA; 7	SIL; SPR; 10	HUN; FEA; 18	HUN; SPR; 18	HOC; FEA; Ret	HOC; SPR; 12	SPA; FEA; Ret	SPA; SPR; 17†	MNZ; FEA; 12	MNZ; SPR; 15	SEP; FEA; 10	SEP; SPR; 20	YMC; FEA; 15	YMC; SPR; 18	18th	9

^{†} Driver did not finish the race, but was classified as he completed over 90% of the race distance.

Sporting positions
Preceded by Alon Day	Asian Formula Renault Series; Champion; 2010	Succeeded by Leopold Ringbom
Preceded by Ed Jones	Euroformula Open Championship; Champion; 2014	Succeeded by Vitor Baptista
Preceded by Germán Sánchez	Spanish Formula Three; Champion; 2014	Succeeded by Konstantin Tereshchenko
