= Gustavo Menezes =

American-Brazilian racing driver (born 1994)

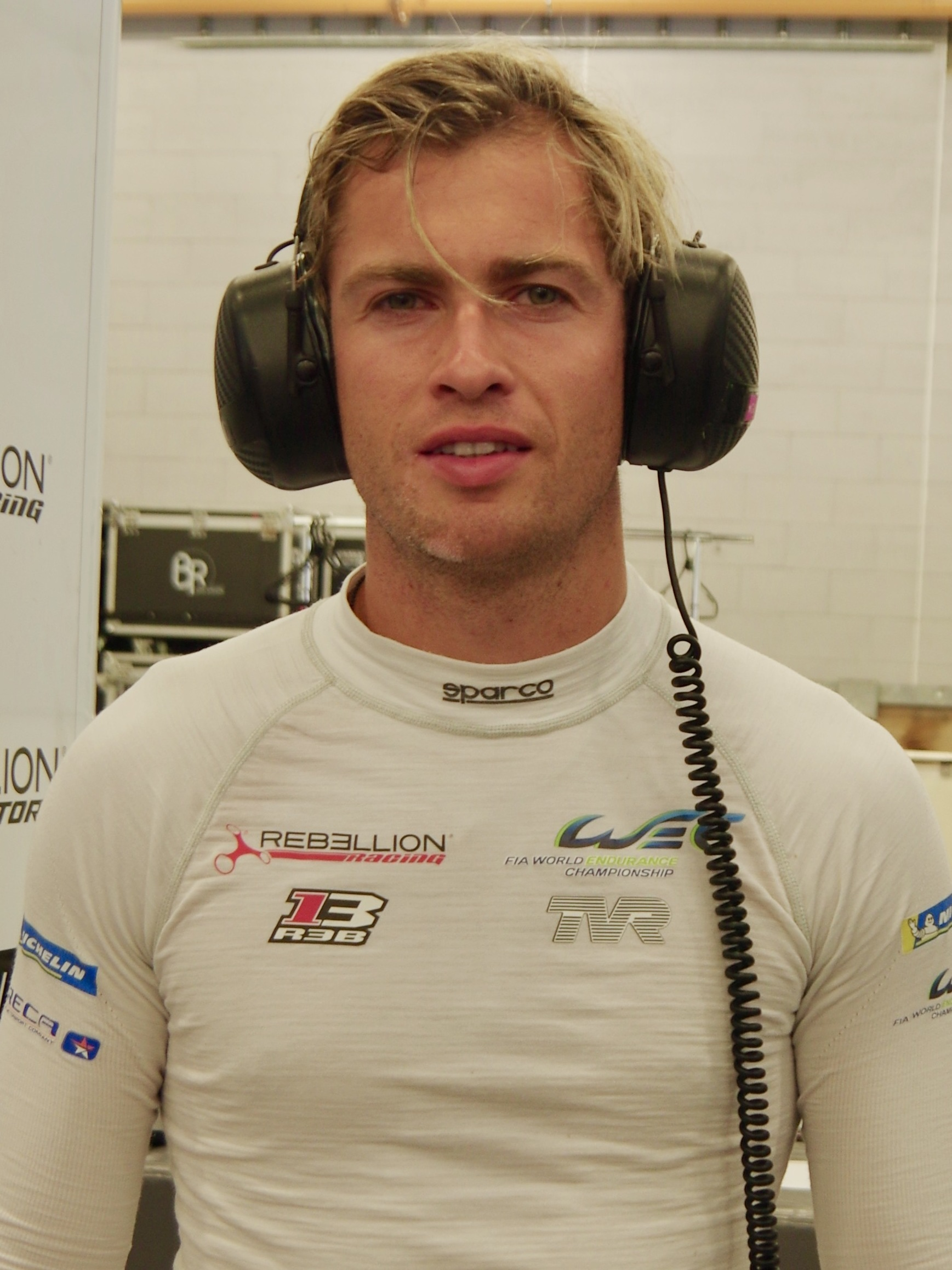
- Menezes in 2019
- Nationality: (United States) American
- Born: Gustavo Soiblemann Menezes; 19 September 1994 (age 32) Los Angeles, California, U.S.

FIA World Endurance Championship career
- Debut season: 2016
- Current team: Peugeot TotalEnergies
- Categorisation: FIA Silver (until 2016); FIA Gold (2017–2022); FIA Platinum (2023–)
- Car number: 94
- Former teams: Signatech Alpine; Rebellion Racing; Glickenhaus Racing
- Starts: 44
- Championships: 1 (LMP2)
- Wins: 8
- Poles: 9
- Fastest laps: 2
- Best finish: 1st in 2016

Previous series
- 2016-17 2014–15 2013 2013 2011–12 2011–12 2011 2010: Asian Le Mans Series; United SportsCar Championship; American Le Mans Series; German Formula Three; Eurocup Formula Renault 2.0; Star Mazda Championship; Formula Renault 2.0 Alps; Pacific F2000

Championship titles
- 2016: FIA Endurance Trophy for LMP2 Drivers

Gustavo Soiblemann Menezes (born 19 September 1994) is an American-Brazilian racing driver.

== Early career ==
=== Karting ===
Menezes began karting in 2001, and took his first championship in 2005 in the IKF Region 7 Sprint - HPV 1 Cadet. He additionally won the SKUSA SuperNationals in both the 2003 and 2004 editions. In 2007, he was the Stars of Tomorrow Juniors champion. In 2008, he began karting outside the United States. In Asia he competed in the CIK-FIA Asia-Pacific Championship becoming fifth in the championship in 2008. That same year, Carlos Sainz, Jr. won the championship. In Europe, he competed in championship in among others Monaco, Sweden and Belgium. He competed in the world karting championship from 2009 to 2010, but he started his single-seater career in 2011.

=== German Formula Three ===
In 2013, Menezes competed in the German Formula Three. He drove the full season with Van Amersfoort Racing and won two races. He became fourth in the championship with 241 points.

=== American Le Mans Series/United SportsCar Championship ===
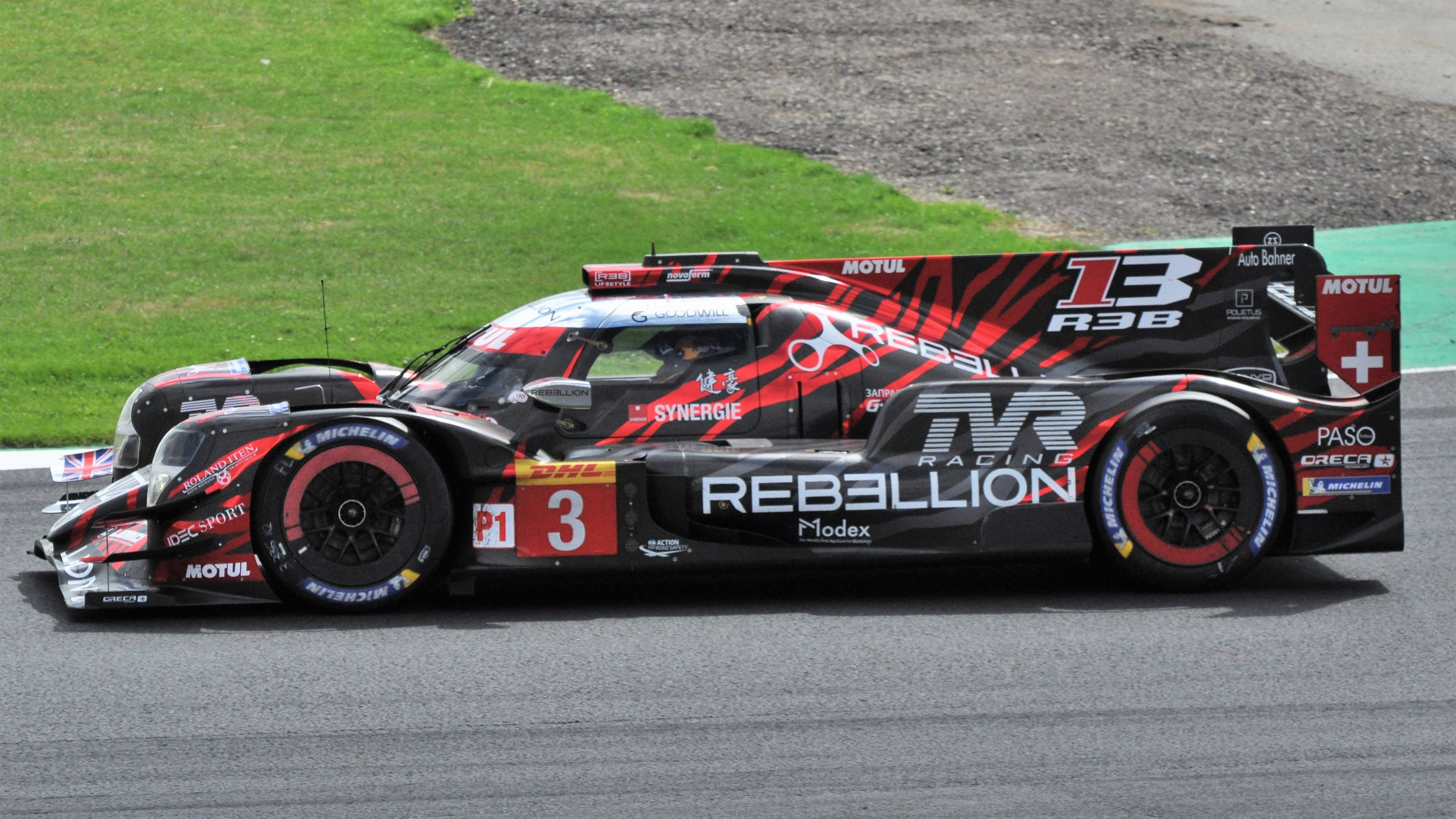
Menezes driving in the 2018 6 Hours of Silverstone.

Menezes began his endurance racing career in 2013, driving for RSR Racing in the American Le Mans Series in the Prototype Challenge class. He only entered the Petit Le Mans with co-drivers Bruno Junqueira and Duncan Ende and finished 29th overall and sixth in class.

Both in 2014 and 2015, Menezes competed again with RSR Racing and again in the Prototype Challenge class. In those two seasons he entered three races. In 2014 he only entered the 24 Hours of Daytona, but he and his co-drivers were unable to finish and were classified in a disappointing 63rd position. In 2015, he entered the first two races of the season: the 24 Hours of Daytona, where he finished 34th overall and fourth in class, and the 12 Hours of Sebring, where he finished 31st overall and sixth in class.

=== FIA European Formula 3 Championship ===
After he had finished fourth in the championship in the German Formula Three, Menezes graduated to the FIA European Formula 3 Championship in 2014 and drove again with Van Amersfoort Racing. He finished 11th in the championship and managed to take two third-place finishes at Spa-Francorchamps. In 2015, he joined Jagonya Ayam with Carlin.

== Sportscar career (2016-) ==
Following a test at Bahrain near the end of 2015, Menezes signed for Signatech-Alpine to compete in the LMP2 category of the 2016 FIA World Endurance Championship, partnering Nicolas Lapierre and Stéphane Richelmi. The team experienced a dominant campaign, winning four races, including three wins in a row and a class victory at the 24 Hours of Le Mans, and ended up winning the title. As a result of his impressive debut season, Menezes was selected to drive a Porsche 919 Hybrid LMP1 car at the post-season rookie test. The American's hot streak continued into 2017, as he took two race wins in the Asian Le Mans Series held during the winter. However, the trio of Menezes, Tung Ho-Pin, and Thomas Laurent missed out on the overall title due to accident damage sustained at the start of the season finale.

For the main 2017 campaign, ahead of which he was upgraded to gold-ranking by the FIA, Menezes returned to Signatech-Alpine for another season of the WEC, this time driving alongside a litany of other drivers throughout the year. Despite scoring three pole positions and five podiums, chief among which being a second successive triumph at the Circuit of the Americas, the team ended up third in the standings.

In 2018, Menezes would not just contest the European Le Mans Series with Algarve Pro Racing alongside Harrison Newey and Ryan Cullen (where the trio finished all six races on their way to ninth in the teams' standings), but also stepped up to the LMP1 class with Rebellion Racing for the 'Super Season' in the WEC. In a truncated LMP1 field, Rebellion stood out as the best of the privateer entries, as Menezes, Thomas Laurent, and Mathias Beche helped the No. 3 squad towards third in the championship. Highlights included an overall podium at the 2018 Le Mans race as well as a win at the 6 Hours of Silverstone, where a disqualification for both Toyota entries handed the win to Menezes and his teammates.

Menezes remained at Rebellion for the 2019–20 WEC season, this time partnering Bruno Senna and LMP1 rookie Norman Nato in the team's sole full-time entry. This campaign saw more success, as the trio managed to win at both Shanghai and Austin, with a runner-up finish at the postponed 24 Hours of Le Mans to boot.

Entering the new Le Mans Hypercar era, Menezes drove for Glickenhaus Racing at the 6 Hours of Monza in 2021, one of just four events the American participated in during the year – the others being appearances in the European Le Mans Series with DragonSpeed USA and G-Drive Racing. Before the 2022 WEC campaign, it was announced that Menezes would join Peugeot Sport for their Hypercar class debut. He made appearances in all three of Peugeot's 2022 races as the team battled technical gremlins.

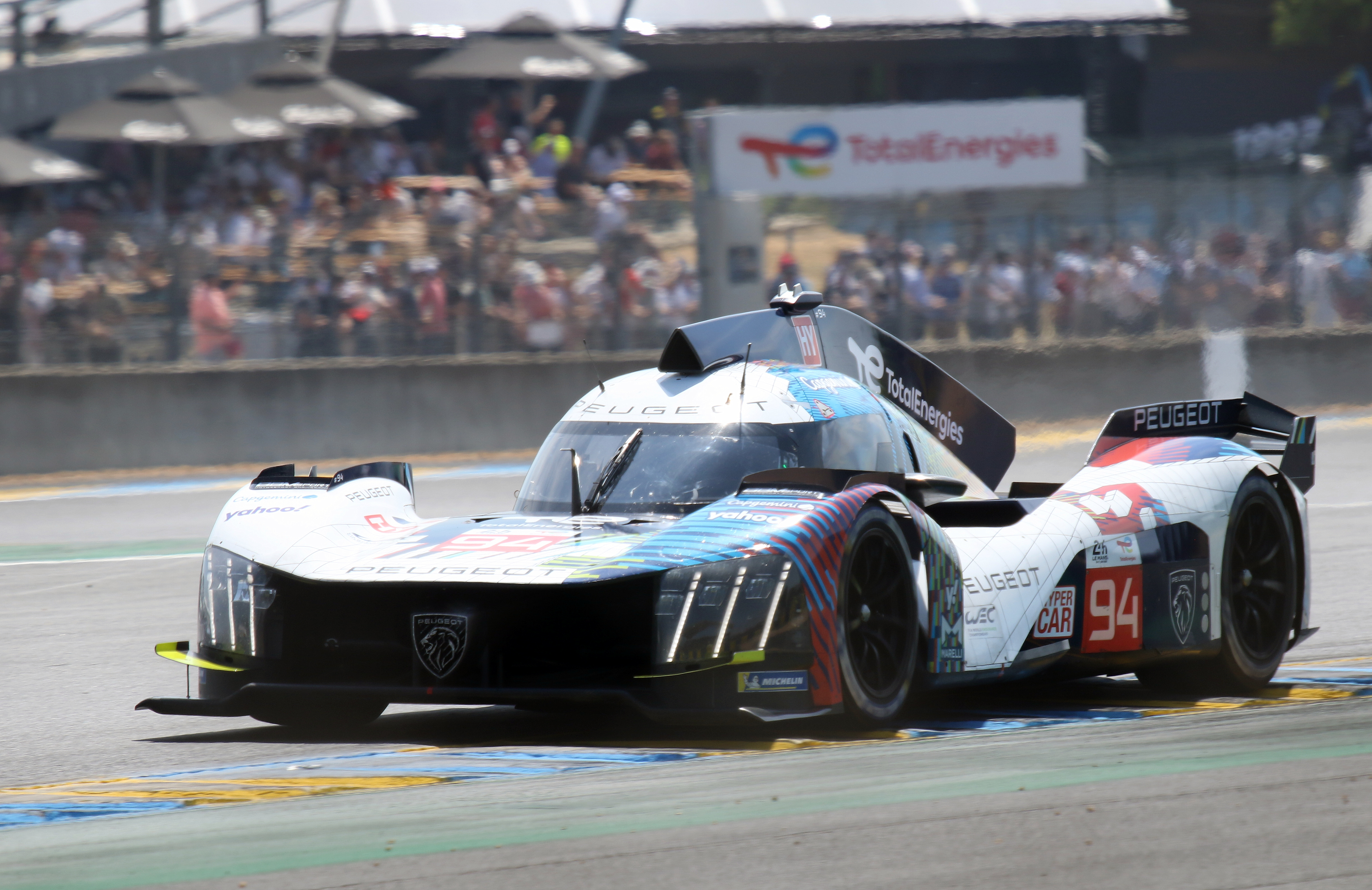
Menezes's Peugeot 9X8 at the 2023 24 Hours of Le Mans.

Menezes and Peugeot entered the WEC season full-time in 2023, as the American joined Nico Müller and Loïc Duval in the No. 94 lineup. Having struggled throughout the year, the team came to the fore at Le Mans, with Menezes taking the lead as the rain came down. Unfortunately, shortly after re-entering the car, Menezes has an incident from the P3, later on the team faced a list of mechanical issues leaving them to finish in 12th-place. At the end of the year, which Menezes ended 11th in the drivers' standings, the American ended his tenure at the French manufacturer.

== Racing record ==
=== Career summary ===
Season	Series	Team	Races	Wins	Poles	F/Laps	Podiums	Points	Position
2010	Pacific F2000 Championship	Unknown	2	0	0	0	0	12	14th
2011	Star Mazda Championship	Juncos Racing	11	0	0	0	1	297	8th
2011	Eurocup Formula Renault 2.0	Interwetten.com Racing Junior Team	8	0	0	0	0	0	37th
2011	Formula Renault 2.0 Alps	Interwetten.com Racing Junior Team	6	0	0	0	0	68	18th
2012	Star Mazda Championship	Team Pelfrey	17	0	0	0	0	208	9th
2012	Eurocup Formula Renault 2.0	Fortec Motorsports	2	0	0	0	0	0	NC†
2013	German Formula 3 Championship	Van Amersfoort Racing	17	2	0	2	8	241	4th
2013	American Le Mans Series - PC	RSR Racing	1	0	0	0	0	0	24th
2014	FIA Formula 3 European Championship	Van Amersfoort Racing	33	0	1	0	2	91	11th
2014	Macau Grand Prix	Van Amersfoort Racing	1	0	0	0	0	N/A	10th
2014	United SportsCar Championship - PC	RSR Racing	1	0	0	0	0	1	59th
2015	FIA Formula 3 European Championship	Jagonya Ayam with Carlin	33	0	0	1	0	65	12th
2015	Macau Grand Prix	Jagonya Ayam with Carlin	1	0	0	0	0	N/A	DNF
2015	United SportsCar Championship - PC	RSR Racing	3	0	0	0	0	53	23rd
2015	Global RallyCross Championship - GRC Lites	Olsbergs MSE	1	0	0	0	0	11	20th
2016	FIA World Endurance Championship - LMP2	Signatech-Alpine	9	4	2	1	7	199	**1st**
2016	24 Hours of Le Mans - LMP2	Signatech-Alpine	1	1	0	0	1	N/A	**1st**
2016-17	Asian Le Mans Series - LMP2	Jackie Chan DC Racing	4	2	1	0	3	69	**3rd**
2017	FIA World Endurance Championship - LMP2	Signatech Alpine Matmut	9	1	3	0	5	151	4th
2017	24 Hours of Le Mans - LMP2	Signatech Alpine Matmut	1	0	0	0	0	N/A	8th
2017	IMSA SportsCar Championship - Prototype	Rebellion Racing	1	0	0	0	0	23	35th
2017	IMSA SportsCar Championship - GTD	3GT Racing	1	0	0	0	0	4	85th
2018	European Le Mans Series - LMP2	APR - Rebellion Racing	6	0	0	0	0	23.25	12th
2018	IMSA SportsCar Championship - Prototype	JDC-Miller MotorSports	1	0	0	0	0	24	54th
2018	24 Hours of Le Mans	Rebellion Racing	1	0	0	0	1	N/A	**3rd**
2018-19	FIA World Endurance Championship	Rebellion Racing	8	1	0	0	4	114	**3rd**
2019	24 Hours of Le Mans	Rebellion Racing	1	0	0	0	0	N/A	5th
2019-20	FIA World Endurance Championship	Rebellion Racing	7	2	4	1	6	145	**3rd**
2020	IMSA SportsCar Championship - LMP2	DragonSpeed USA	1	0	0	1	0	26	23rd
2020	24 Hours of Le Mans	Rebellion Racing	1	0	0	0	1	N/A	**2nd**
2021	FIA World Endurance Championship - Hypercar	Glickenhaus Racing	1	0	0	0	0	0	8th
2021	European Le Mans Series - LMP2	DragonSpeed USA	1	0	0	0	0	10.5	23rd
2021	European Le Mans Series - LMP2	G-Drive Racing	2	0	0	0	0	10.5	23rd
2022	FIA World Endurance Championship - Hypercar	Peugeot TotalEnergies	3	0	0	0	0	40	6th
2023	FIA World Endurance Championship - Hypercar	Peugeot TotalEnergies	7	0	0	0	0	28	11th
2023	24 Hours of Le Mans - Hypercar	Peugeot TotalEnergies	1	0	0	0	0	N/A	12th
2025-26	Asian Le Mans Series - LMP2	High Class Racing	6	1	0	0	1	36	8th

^{†} As Menezes was a guest driver, he was ineligible for points.

=== Complete Eurocup Formula Renault 2.0 results ===
(key) (Races in bold indicate pole position; races in italics indicate fastest lap)

Year	Entrant	1	2	3	4	5	6	7	8	9	10	11	12	13	14	DC	Points
2011	Interwetten.com Racing Junior Team	ALC; 1	ALC; 2	SPA; 1; 32	SPA; 2; 19	NÜR; 1	NÜR; 2	HUN; 1; 27	HUN; 2 Ret	SIL; 1; 22	SIL; 2; 20	LEC; 1	LEC; 2	CAT; 1; 18	CAT; 2; 22	37th	0
2012	Fortec Motorsports	ALC; 1	ALC; 2	SPA; 1	SPA; 2	NÜR; 1	NÜR; 2	MSC; 1	MSC; 2	HUN; 1	HUN; 2	LEC; 1; 24	LEC; 2; 20	CAT; 1	CAT; 2	NC†	0

† As Menezes was a guest driver, he was ineligible for points

=== Complete Formula Renault 2.0 Alps Series results ===
(key) (Races in bold indicate pole position; races in italics indicate fastest lap)

Year	Team	1	2	3	4	5	6	7	8	9	10	11	12	13	14	Pos	Points
2011	Interwetten.com Racing Junior Team	MNZ; 1	MNZ; 2	IMO; 1; 13	IMO; 2; 8	PAU; 1	PAU; 2	RBR; 1	RBR; 2	HUN; 1; 10	HUN; 2; 14	LEC; 1	LEC; 2	SPA; 1; 5	SPA; 2; 6	18th	68

=== Complete German Formula Three Championship results ===
(key) (Races in bold indicate pole position) (Races in italics indicate fastest lap)

Year	Entrant	1	2	3	4	5	6	7	8	9	10	11	12	13	14	15	16	17	18	19	20	21	22	23	24	25	26	27	DC	Points
2013	Van Amersfoort Racing	OSC1; 1; 3	OSC1; 2; 6	OSC1; 2; 6	SPA; 1; 3	SPA; 2; 4	SPA; 3; 7	NÜR1; 1; 7	NÜR1; 2 C	NÜR1; 3; 7	SAC; 1; 15†	SAC; 2; 7	SAC; 3; 3	LAU1; 1; 5	LAU1; 2; 1	LAU1; 3; 4	NÜR2; 1; 4	NÜR2; 2; 8	NÜR2; 3; 3	LAU2; 1; 4	LAU2; 2; 4	LAU2; 3; 4	OSC2; 1; 3	OSC2; 2; 7	OSC2; 3; 2	HOC; 1; 5	HOC; 2; 1	HOC; 3; 4	4th	241

=== Complete FIA Formula 3 European Championship results ===
(key) (Races in bold indicate pole position) (Races in italics indicate fastest lap)

Year	Entrant	Engine	1	2	3	4	5	6	7	8	9	10	11	12	13	14	15	16	17	18	19	20	21	22	23	24	25	26	27	28	29	30	31	32	33	DC	Points
2014	Van Amersfoort Racing	Volkswagen	SIL; 1; 16	SIL; 2; 13	SIL; 3; 18	HOC; 1 Ret	HOC; 2; 21	HOC; 3; 9	PAU; 1; 15	PAU; 2; 13	PAU; 3 Ret	HUN; 1; 17	HUN; 2; 7	HUN; 3; 8	SPA; 1; 6	**SPA**; **2**; 3	SPA; 3; 3	NOR; 1 Ret	NOR; 2; 10	NOR; 3; 5	MSC; 1; 10	MSC; 2; 15	MSC; 3; 12	RBR; 1; 7	RBR; 2; 5	RBR; 3; 8	NÜR; 1; 14	NÜR; 2; 13	NÜR; 3; 13	IMO; 1 Ret	IMO; 2; 10	IMO; 3; 10	HOC; 1; 8	HOC; 2; 9	HOC; 3; 16	11th	91
2015	Jagonya Ayam with Carlin	Volkswagen	SIL; 1; 7	SIL; 2; 18	SIL; 3; 4	HOC; 1; 9	HOC; 2; 7	HOC; 3; 11	PAU; 1; 15	PAU; 2; 14	PAU; 3 Ret	MNZ; 1; 13	MNZ; 2; 5	MNZ; 3; 6	SPA; 1; 22	SPA; 2 Ret	SPA; 3 DNS	NOR; 1; 7	NOR; 2; 7	NOR; 3 Ret	ZAN; 1; 16	ZAN; 2; 10	ZAN; 3 Ret	RBR; 1; 8	RBR; 2; 10	RBR; 3; 12	ALG; 1; 15	ALG; 2; 4	ALG; 3 Ret	NÜR; 1; 14	NÜR; 2 Ret	NÜR; 3; 14	HOC; 1; 20	HOC; 2; 12	HOC; 3; 13	12th	65

=== Complete IMSA SportsCar Championship results ===
(key)(Races in bold indicate pole position, Results are overall/class)

Year	Entrant	Class	Make	Engine	1	2	3	4	5	6	7	8	9	10	11	12	Rank	Points
2014	RSR Racing	PC	Oreca FLM09	Chevrolet LS3 6.2 L V8.	DAY; 9	SEB	LGA	KAN	WGL	IMS	ELK	VIR	COA	PET			59th	1
2015	RSR Racing	PC	Oreca FLM09	Chevrolet LS3 6.2 L V8.	DAY; 4	SEB; 6	LGA	DET	WGL	MOS	LIM	ELK	COA	PET; 6			23rd	53
2017	3GT Racing	GTD	Lexus RC F GT3	Lexus 2UR-GSE 5.4 L V8	DAY; 27	SEB	LBH	COA	DET	WGL	MOS	LIM	ELK	VIR	LGA		85th	4
2017	Rebellion Racing	P	Oreca 07	Gibson GK428 4.2 L V8												PET; 8	35th	23
2018	JDC-Miller MotorSports	P	Oreca 07	Gibson GK428 4.2 L V8	DAY; 7	SEB	LBH	MDO	DET	WGL	MOS	ELK	LGA	PET			54th	24
2020	DragonSpeed USA	LMP2	Oreca 07	Gibson GK428 4.2 L V8	DAY	SEB; 5	ELK	ATL	PET	LGA	SEB						23rd	26

=== Complete Global RallyCross Championship results ===
==== GRC Lites ====
Year	Entrant	Car	1	2	3	4	5	6	7	8	9	10	11	12	Pos	Points
2015	Olsbergs MSE	Lites Ford Fiesta	FTA	DAY	DAY	MCAS	DET	DET	DC	LA	LA	BAR	BAR	LV; 9	20th	11

=== Complete FIA World Endurance Championship results ===
Year	Entrant	Class	Car	Engine	1	2	3	4	5	6	7	8	9	Rank	Points
2016	Signatech-Alpine	LMP2	Alpine A460	Nissan VK45DE 4.5 L V8	SIL; 4	SPA; 1	LMS; 1	NÜR; 1	MEX; 2	**COA**; 1	FUJ; 3	SHA; 4	**BHR**; 3	1st	199
2017	Signatech Alpine Matmut	LMP2	Alpine A470	Gibson GK428 4.2 L V8	SIL; 4	SPA; 5	LMS; 5	NÜR; 3	**MEX**; 2	**COA**; 1	FUJ; 2	SHA; 2	**BHR**; 4	4th	151
2018–19	Rebellion Racing	LMP1	Rebellion R13	Gibson GL458 4.5 L V8	SPA; 3	LMS; 3	SIL; 1	FUJ; Ret	SHA; 5	SEB; 7	SPA; 2	LMS; 5		3rd	114
2019–20	Rebellion Racing	LMP1	Rebellion R13	Gibson GL458 4.5 L V8	SIL; 9	FUJ; 3	**SHA**; 1	**BHR**; 3	**COA**; 1	**SPA**; 3	LMS; 2	BHR		3rd	145
2021	Glickenhaus Racing	Hypercar	Glickenhaus SCG 007 LMH	Glickenhaus P21 3.5 L Turbo V8	SPA	ALG	MNZ; Ret	LMS	BHR	BHR				8th	0
2022	Peugeot TotalEnergies	Hypercar	Peugeot 9X8	Peugeot X6H 2.6 L Turbo V6	SEB	SPA	LMS	MNZ; 4	FUJ; 5	BHR; 4				6th	40
2023	Peugeot TotalEnergies	Hypercar	Peugeot 9X8	Peugeot X6H 2.6 L Turbo V6	SEB; NC	ALG; 5	SPA; 9	LMS; 9	MNZ; 11	FUJ; 7	BHR; 8			11th	28

=== Complete 24 Hours of Le Mans results ===
Year	Team	Co-Drivers	Car	Class	Laps	Pos.	Class Pos.
2016	(France) Signatech Alpine	(France) Nicolas Lapierre (Monaco) Stéphane Richelmi	Alpine A460-Nissan	LMP2	357	5th	**1st**
2017	(France) Signatech Alpine Matmut	(France) Romain Dumas (United Kingdom) Matt Rao	Alpine A470-Gibson	LMP2	351	10th	8th
2018	(Switzerland) Rebellion Racing	(Switzerland) Mathias Beche (France) Thomas Laurent	Rebellion R13-Gibson	LMP1	376	**3rd**	**3rd**
2019	(Switzerland) Rebellion Racing	(France) Nathanaël Berthon (France) Thomas Laurent	Rebellion R13-Gibson	LMP1	370	5th	5th
2020	(Switzerland) Rebellion Racing	(France) Norman Nato (Brazil) Bruno Senna	Rebellion R13-Gibson	LMP1	382	**2nd**	**2nd**
2023	(France) Peugeot TotalEnergies	(France) Loïc Duval (Switzerland) Nico Müller	Peugeot 9X8	Hypercar	312	27th	12th

=== Complete Asian Le Mans Series results ===
(Races in bold indicate pole position) (Races in italics indicate fastest lap)

Year	Team	Class	Car	Engine	1	2	3	4	5	6	Pos.	Points
2016–17	Jackie Chan DC Racing	LMP2	Oreca 03R	Nissan VK45DE 4.5 L V8	ZHU; 1	FUJ; 2	**CHA**; 1	SEP; Ret			3rd	69
2025–26	High Class Racing	LMP2	Oreca 07	Gibson GK428 4.2 L V8	SEP; 1; 12	**SEP**; **2**; 7	DUB; 1; 9	DUB; 2; 6	ABU; 1; 8	ABU; 2; 3	8th	36

=== Complete European Le Mans Series results ===
Year	Entrant	Class	Chassis	Engine	1	2	3	4	5	6	Rank	Points
2018	APR - Rebellion Racing	LMP2	Oreca 07	Gibson GK428 4.2 L V8	LEC; 15	MNZ; 8	RBR; 6	SIL; 5	SPA; 15‡	ALG; 12	12th	23.25
2021	DragonSpeed USA	LMP2	Oreca 07	Gibson GK428 4.2 L V8	CAT	RBR; 12	LEC; WD	MNZ			23rd	10.5
2021	G-Drive Racing	LMP2	Aurus 01	Gibson GK428 4.2 L V8					SPA; 7	ALG; 8	23rd	10.5

^{‡} Half points awarded as less than 75% of race distance was completed.

Sporting positions
Preceded by Sam Bird; Julien Canal; Roman Rusinov	FIA Endurance Trophy for LMP2 Drivers; 2016; With: Nicolas Lapierre & Stephane Richelmi	Succeeded by Bruno Senna; Julien Canal
