= Marvin Kirchhöfer =

German racing driver

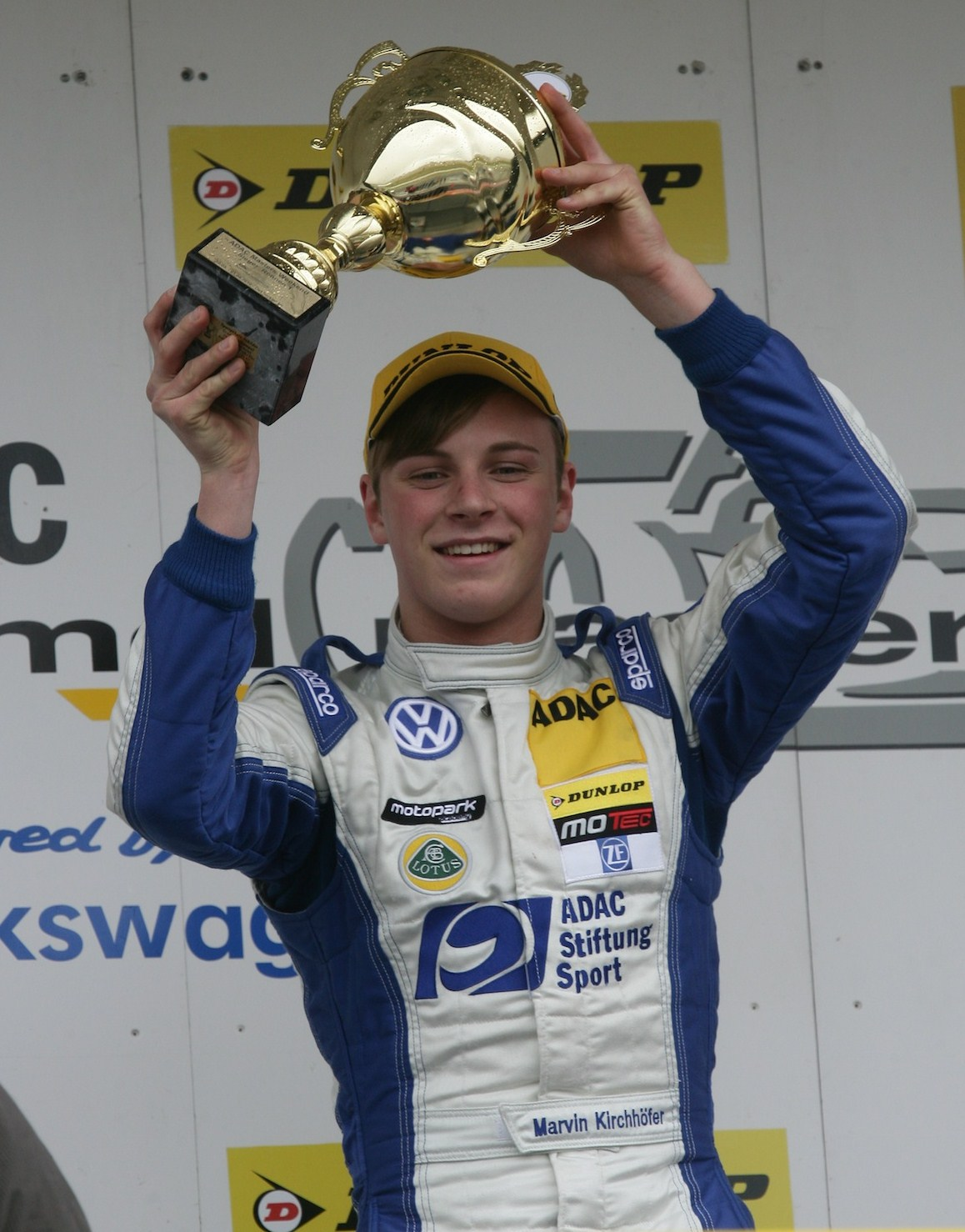
- Kirchhöfer in 2012
- Nationality: (Germany) German
- Born: 19 March 1994 (age 32) Leipzig, Germany

GT World Challenge Europe career
- Debut season: 2017
- Current team: Garage 59
- Categorisation: FIA Gold (until 2022); FIA Platinum (2023–)
- Car number: 59
- Former teams: Jota Sport, R-Motorsport, Black Falcon
- Starts: 38 (39 entries)
- Wins: 3
- Podiums: 6
- Poles: 3
- Fastest laps: 0
- Best finish: 6th in 2019 (Pro)

Previous series
- 2016 2014-15 2013 2012: GP2 Series; GP3 Series; German Formula Three; ADAC Formel Masters

Championship titles
- 2013 2012: German Formula Three; ADAC Formel Masters

Marvin Kirchhöfer (born 19 March 1994) is a German racing driver who competes in the FIA World Endurance Championship and GT World Challenge Europe as a McLaren factory driver.

Kirchhöfer achieved considerable successes in his junior career, with back-to-back titles in ADAC Formel Masters (2012) and German F3 (2013), a record six GP3 Series wins, and a season in GP2. Kirchhöfer then moved to sports car racing in 2017, taking several victories for Callaway in ADAC GT Masters. He also finished second at the 2019 Bathurst 12 Hour and won once in Blancpain for R-Motorsport.

Kirchhöfer signed for McLaren as factory driver in 2022. He won the Goodwood Festival of Speed timed shootout in 2023 in a McLaren Solus GT. In 2025, Kirchhöfer set pole for the 24 Hours of Spa and ended McLaren's GT World Challenge Europe win drought, while also winning the 24 Hours of Daytona in GTD in a Corvette. In 2026, Kirchhöfer led Garage 59 to its first FIA World Endurance Championship victory in LMGT3.

== Career ==
=== Karting ===
Born in Leipzig, Saxony, Kirchhöfer began karting in 1999 and mainly raced in Germany, working his way up from the junior ranks (Bambini-B) to the KF2 category by 2010. In 2011, he won the German Kart Championship (KF1), winning all five final races.

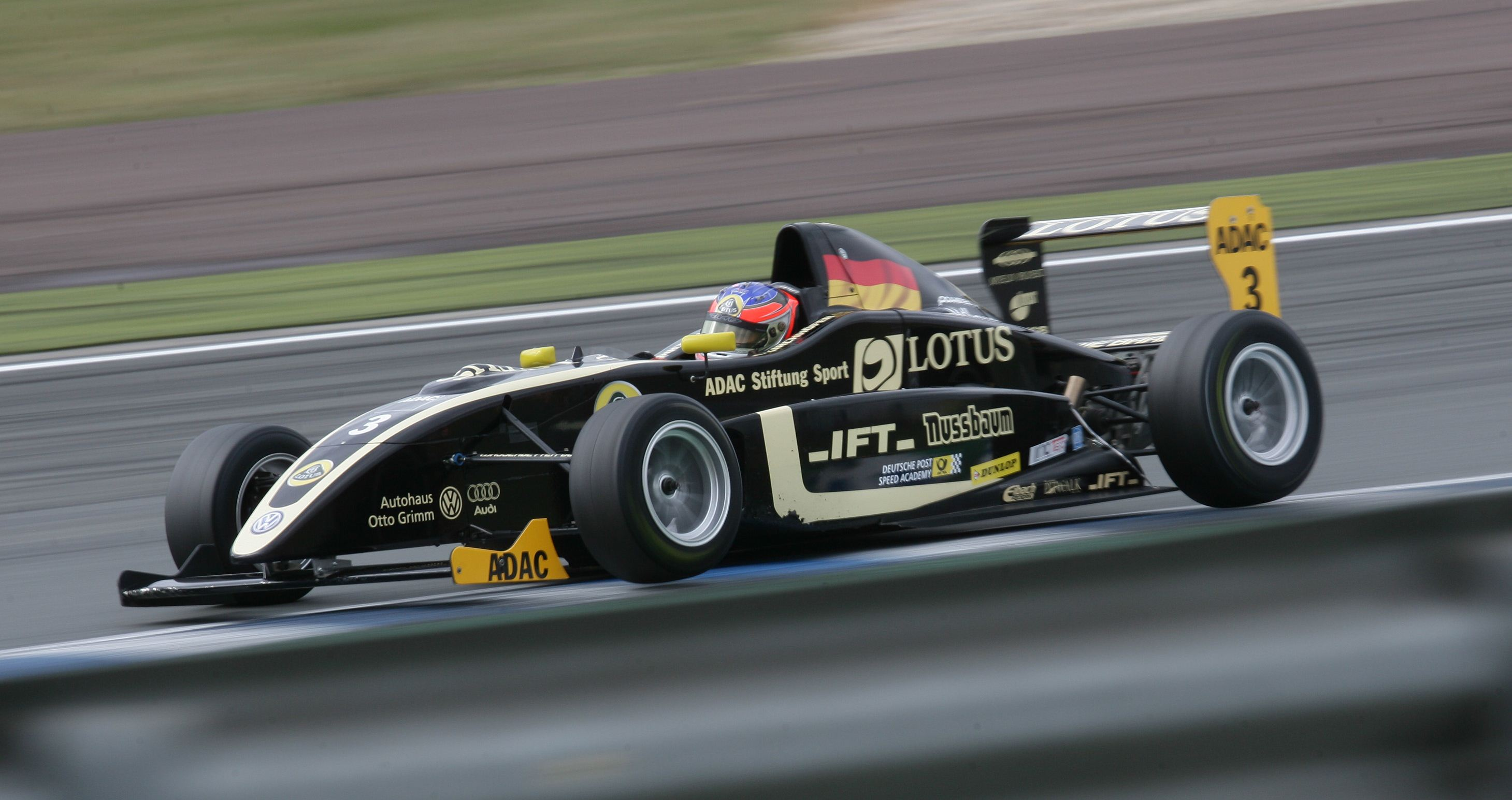
Marvin Kirchhöfer during practice at Oschersleben 2012

=== ADAC Formel Masters ===
2012 saw Kirchhöfer make his debut in the ADAC Formel Masters championship with Lotus. He was able to win the first race in Oschersleben and scored two wins from pole position at the following race weekend in Zandvoort. He finished the season with a perfect round at the Hockenheim with two poles, three fastest laps and three wins in the three races. He won the championship in his debut year with nine wins and 329 points.

=== German Formula 3 ===
In 2013, Kirchhöfer debuted in the German Formula 3 Championship. He dominated the series, taking 25 podiums in 26 races, including 13 wins. He finished on 511 points with second place, team-mate Artem Markelov, on less than 350. His only non podium finish was a fourth place in the second race of the year. He also set the fastest race lap in 17 of the races. His team Lotus won the team's championship while Kirchhöfer won the rookie cup with only four races not finishing as the best rookie.

=== GP3 Series ===
In 2014, Kirchhöfer debuted in GP3 Series with ART Grand Prix. In his first season, he finished third in the standings with one win. He remained with the team for 2015, again finishing third place, and accumulated six wins and fifteen podiums over his time in the series.

=== GP2 Series ===
In March 2016, it was announced Kirchhöfer would graduate to GP2 with Carlin.

=== McLaren factory driver ===
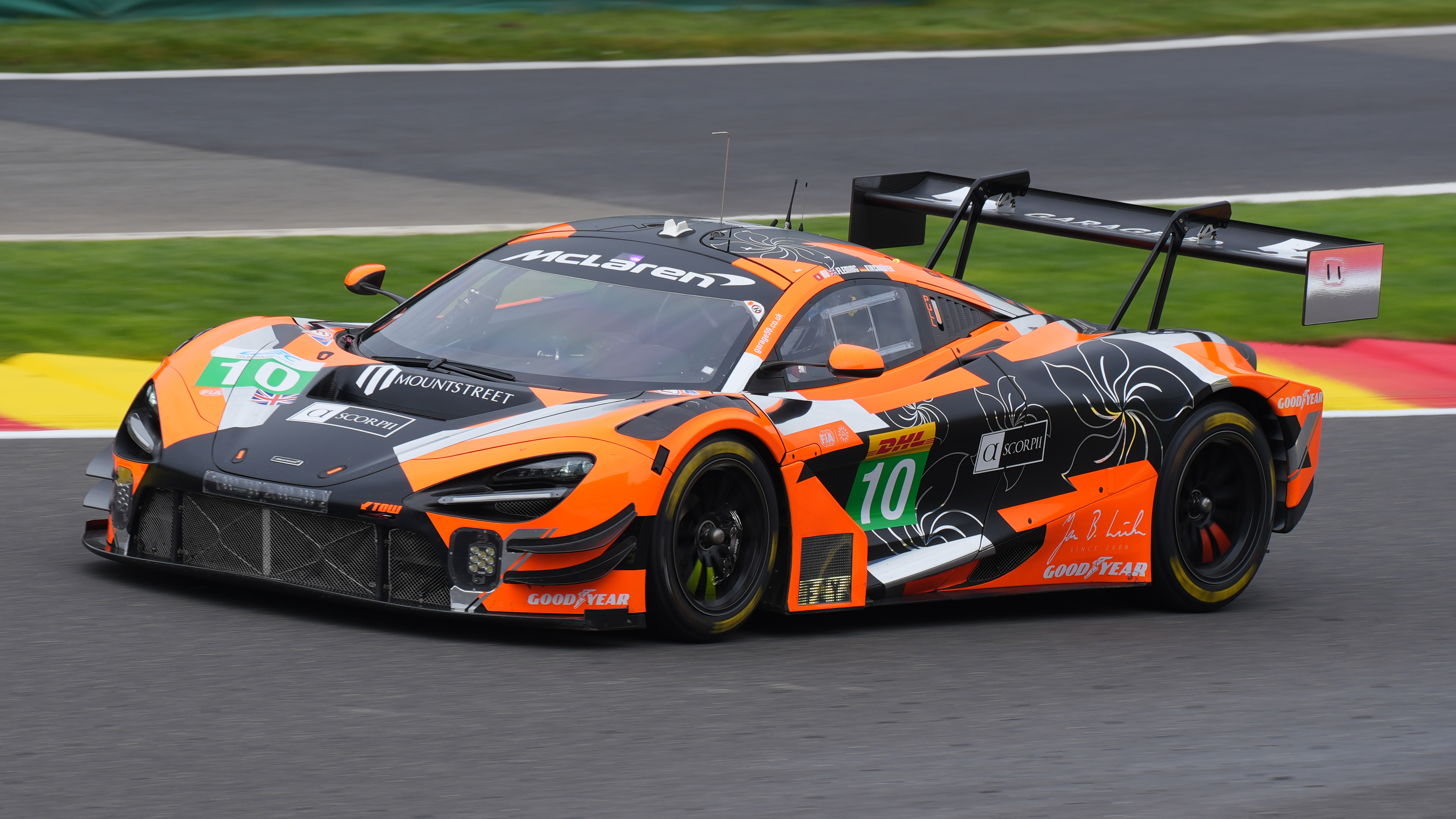
Kirchhöfer en route to victory at the 2026 6 Hours of Spa.

In 2023, Kirchhöfer embarked on a full-season campaign in the GT World Challenge Europe Endurance Cup, joining Danish drivers Benjamin Goethe and Nicolai Kjærgaard in Garage 59's Pro class entry.

=== Goodwood Festival of Speed ===
In July 2023, the McLaren Solus GT made its dynamic debut at the 30th Goodwood Festival of Speed. During the timed shootout, Kirchhöfer set the fastest time in the Solus GT, finishing the hillclimb in 45.34 seconds. This made him the first German driver to win the shootout since Nick Heidfeld in 1999.

== Racing record ==
=== Career summary ===
Season	Series	Team	Races	Wins	Poles	F.L.	Podiums	Points	Position
2012	ADAC Formel Masters	Lotus	23	9	7	8	16	329	**1st**
2013	German Formula 3 Championship	Lotus	26	13	13	17	25	511	**1st**
2014	GP3 Series	ART Grand Prix	16	1	2	4	7	161	**3rd**
2014	British Formula 3 Championship	Fortec Motorsports	3	2	0	2	3	54	8th
2015	GP3 Series	ART Grand Prix	18	5	1	1	8	200	**3rd**
2016	GP2 Series	Carlin	20	0	0	0	1	21	17th
2017	ADAC GT Masters	Mercedes-AMG Team HTP Motorsport	13	0	0	0	2	60	15th
2017	Blancpain GT Series Endurance Cup	Black Falcon	2	0	0	0	0	0	NC
2017	Blancpain GT Series Endurance Cup - Pro-Am	Black Falcon	2	1	0	0	1	47	7th
2017	Intercontinental GT Challenge	Black Falcon	1	0	0	0	0	0	NC
2018	ADAC GT Masters	Callaway Competition	14	3	2	2	5	123	**3rd**
2018	Blancpain GT Series Endurance Cup	R-Motorsport	5	0	1	0	0	13	32nd
2018	24H GT Series - A6	R-Motorsport							
2019	ADAC GT Masters	Callaway Competition	12	3	1	2	3	105	8th
2019	Blancpain GT World Challenge Europe	R-Motorsport	10	1	0	1	1	39.5	8th
2019	Blancpain GT Series Endurance Cup	R-Motorsport	4	0	0	1	1	38	6th
2020	GT World Challenge Europe Endurance Cup	Garage 59	1	0	0	0	0	0	NC
2020	GT World Challenge Europe Endurance Cup - Pro-Am	Garage 59	1	1	0	0	1	33	13th
2020	Intercontinental GT Challenge	R-Motorsport	0	0	0	0	0	0	NC
2021	ADAC GT Masters	Callaway Competition	14	1	0	0	2	95	10th
2021	Asian Le Mans Series - GT	Garage 59	4	0	0	0	0	4.5	14th
2021	GT World Challenge Europe Endurance Cup	Garage 59	1	0	0	0	0	0	NC
2022	Asian Le Mans Series - GT	Garage 59	4	0	0	0	1	27.5	7th
2022	British GT Championship - GT3	Garage 59	1	0	0	1	1	0	NC†
2022	GT World Challenge Europe Endurance Cup	Jota Sport	5	0	0	0	0	10	27th
2023	GT World Challenge Europe Endurance Cup	Garage 59	5	0	0	1	0	0	NC
2023	Asian Le Mans Series - GT	Garage 59	2	0	0	0	0	4	18th
2023	British GT Championship - GT3	Garage 59	6	0	1	1	1	24	16th
2023	British GT Championship - GT3	Optimum Motorsport	1	0	0	0	0	24	16th
2023	IMSA SportsCar Championship - GTD	Inception Racing	1	0	0	0	1	326	48th
2024	IMSA SportsCar Championship - GTD Pro	Pfaff Motorsports	10	0	0	0	2	2689	7th
2024	GT World Challenge Europe Endurance Cup	Garage 59	2	0	0	0	0	0	NC
2024	Nürburgring Langstrecken-Serie - SP9	Dörr Motorsport	1	0	0	0	0	0	NC†
2024-25	Asian Le Mans Series - GT	Optimum Motorsport	4	0	0	0	0	0	35th
2025	British GT Championship - GT3	Optimum Motorsport	9	0	1	0	3	127	7th
2025	IMSA SportsCar Championship - GTD	AWA	1	1	0	1	1	365	55th
2025	IMSA SportsCar Championship - GTD Pro	Vasser Sullivan Racing	1	0	0	0	0	263	31st
2025	GT World Challenge Europe Endurance Cup	Garage 59	5	0	1	0	1	39	7th
2025	GT World Challenge Europe Sprint Cup	Garage 59	10	2	2	0	4	80	**3rd**
2025	International GT Open	Garage 59	2	2	2	1	2	30	11th
2026	IMSA SportsCar Championship - GTD Pro	Corvette Racing by Pratt Miller Motorsports	3	0	1	0	0	779	18th
2026	Bathurst 12 Hour	Optimum Motorsport	1	0	0	0	0	N/A	DNF
2026	FIA World Endurance Championship - LMGT3	Garage 59	8	1	2	0	2	57	12th
2026	GT World Challenge Europe Endurance Cup	Garage 59	4	0	0	0	0	13	18th
2026	GT World Challenge Europe Sprint Cup	Garage 59	8	0	0	0	0	18	16th
2026	24 Hours of Nürburgring - SP9	Dörr Motorsport	1	0	0	0	0	N/A	14th

^{†} As Kirchhöfer was a guest driver he was ineligible to score points.

=== Complete ADAC Formel Masters results ===
(key) (Races in bold indicate pole position) (Races in italics indicate fastest lap)

Year	Team	1	2	3	4	5	6	7	8	9	10	11	12	13	14	15	16	17	18	19	20	21	22	23	24	DC	Points
2012	Lotus	OSC; 1; 1	OSC; 2; 17	OSC; 3; 5	**ZAN**; **1**; 1	**ZAN**; **2**; 1	ZAN; 3; 3	**SAC**; **1**; 2	SAC; 2; 4	SAC; 3 C	NÜR1; 1; 3	NÜR1; 2; 2	NÜR1; 3; 2	RBR; 1 Ret	RBR; 2; 7	RBR; 3; 1	LAU; 1; 3	LAU; 2; 10	LAU; 3; 6	**NÜR2**; **1**; 1	**NÜR2**; **2**; 1	NÜR2; 3; 2	**HOC**; **1**; 1	**HOC**; **2**; 1	HOC; 3; 1	1st	329

=== Complete German Formula Three Championship results ===
(key) (Races in bold indicate pole position) (Races in italics indicate fastest lap)

Year	Entrant	1	2	3	4	5	6	7	8	9	10	11	12	13	14	15	16	17	18	19	20	21	22	23	24	25	26	27	DC	Points
2013	Lotus	**OSC1**; **1**; 1	OSC1; 2; 4	**OSC1**; **2**; 1	**SPA**; **1**; 1	SPA; 2; 3	**SPA**; **3**; 3	NÜR1; 1; 2	NÜR1; 2 C	NÜR1; 3; 1	**SAC**; **1**; 1	SAC; 2; 2	**SAC**; **3**; 1	**LAU1**; **1**; 2	LAU1; 2; 3	**LAU1**; **3**; 1	NÜR2; 1; 2	NÜR2; 2; 2	**NÜR2**; **3**; 1	LAU2; 1; 3	LAU2; 2; 1	LAU2; 3; 2	**OSC2**; **1**; 1	OSC2; 2; 2	**OSC2**; **3**; 1	**HOC**; **1**; 1	HOC; 2; 3	**HOC**; **3**; 1	1st	511

=== Complete GP3 Series results ===
(key) (Races in bold indicate pole position) (Races in italics indicate fastest lap)

Year	Entrant	1	2	3	4	5	6	7	8	9	10	11	12	13	14	15	16	17	18	Pos	Points
2014	ART Grand Prix	CAT; FEA; 5	CAT; SPR; 5	RBR; FEA; 5	RBR; SPR; DNS	SIL; FEA; 3	SIL; SPR; 4	**HOC**; **FEA**; 1	HOC; SPR; Ret	HUN; FEA; 11	HUN; SPR; 9	SPA; FEA; DNS	SPA; SPR; 17	MNZ; FEA; 3	MNZ; SPR; 3	SOC; FEA; 2	SOC; SPR; 3	**YMC**; **FEA**; 2	YMC; SPR; 11	3rd	161
2015	ART Grand Prix	CAT; FEA; 5	CAT; SPR; 1	RBR; FEA; 6	RBR; SPR; 2	**SIL**; **FEA**; 1	SIL; SPR; 8	HUN; FEA; 3	HUN; SPR; 5	SPA; FEA; 3	SPA; SPR; Ret	MNZ; FEA; 4	MNZ; SPR; 1	SOC; FEA; 9	SOC; SPR; 7	BHR; FEA; 1	BHR; SPR; 6	YMC; FEA; 1	YMC; SPR; 7	3rd	200

=== Complete GP2 Series results ===
(key) (Races in bold indicate pole position) (Races in italics indicate fastest lap)

Year	Entrant	1	2	3	4	5	6	7	8	9	10	11	12	13	14	15	16	17	18	19	20	21	22	DC	Points
2016	Carlin	CAT; FEA; 15	CAT; SPR; 15	MON; FEA; 7	MON; SPR; 2	BAK; FEA; Ret	BAK; SPR; 10	RBR; FEA; Ret	RBR; SPR; 19	SIL; FEA; 12	SIL; SPR; 8	HUN; FEA; 14	HUN; SPR; 13	HOC; FEA; 10	HOC; SPR; 14	SPA; FEA; Ret	SPA; SPR; 14	MNZ; FEA; 18	MNZ; SPR; 8	SEP; FEA; 15	SEP; SPR; 11	YMC; FEA	YMC; SPR	17th	21

=== Complete ADAC GT Masters results ===
(key) (Races in bold indicate pole position) (Races in italics indicate fastest lap)

Year	Team	Car	1	2	3	4	5	6	7	8	9	10	11	12	13	14	Pos.	Points
2017	Mercedes-AMG Team HTP Motorsport	Mercedes-AMG GT3	OSC; 1; 15	OSC; 2; 6	LAU; 1; 4	LAU; 2; 10	RBR; 1; 13	RBR; 2; 7	ZAN; 1; 3	ZAN; 2; 16	NÜR; 1; 12	NÜR; 2	SAC; 1; 2	SAC; 2 Ret	HOC; 1; 11	HOC; 2; 11	15th	60
2018	Callaway Competition	Corvette C7 GT3-R	OSC; 1; 19	OSC; 2; 18	MST; 1; 2	MST; 2; 2	**RBR**; **1**; 1	**RBR**; **2**; 1	NÜR; 1 Ret	NÜR; 2 Ret	ZAN; 1; 17	ZAN; 2; 13	SAC; 1 Ret	SAC; 2; 7	HOC; 1; 1	HOC; 2; 7	3rd	123
2019	Callaway Competition	Corvette C7 GT3-R	OSC; 1; 1	OSC; 2; 12	MST; 1; 19	MST; 2; 1	RBR; 1; 5	**RBR**; **2**; 1	ZAN; 1; 24	ZAN; 2; 20	NÜR; 1; 12	NÜR; 2; 7	HOC; 1 Ret	HOC; 2 Ret	SAC; 1	SAC; 2	8th	105
2021	Callaway Competition	Corvette C7 GT3-R	OSC; 1; 13	OSC; 2 Ret	RBR; 1; 3	RBR; 2; 1	ZAN; 1; 7	ZAN; 2; 4	LAU; 1 Ret	LAU; 2; 25	SAC; 1; 14	SAC; 2; 9	HOC; 1; 11	HOC; 2; 9	NÜR; 1; 13	NÜR; 2; 13	10th	95

=== Complete GT World Challenge Europe results ===
==== GT World Challenge Europe Endurance Cup ====
(key) (Races in bold indicate pole position) (Races in italics indicate fastest lap)

Year	Team	Car	Class	1	2	3	4	5	6	7	Pos.	Points
2017	Black Falcon	Mercedes-AMG GT3	Pro-Am	MNZ	SIL	LEC	SPA; 6H; 14	SPA; 12H; 12	SPA; 24H; 12	CAT; 30	7th	47
2018	R-Motorsport	Aston Martin V12 Vantage GT3	Pro	MNZ; 9	SIL; 5	LEC; 38	SPA; 6H; 17	SPA; 12H; 17	**SPA**; **24H**; 35	CAT; 19	32nd	13
2019	R-Motorsport	Aston Martin V12 Vantage GT3	Pro	MNZ; 19	SIL; DNS	LEC; 4	SPA; 6H; 5	SPA; 12H; 25	SPA; 24H; 19	CAT; 2	6th	38
2020	Garage 59	Aston Martin Vantage AMR GT3	Pro-Am	IMO	NÜR	SPA; 6H	SPA; 12H	SPA; 24H	LEC; 20		13th	33
2021	Garage 59	Aston Martin Vantage AMR GT3	Pro-Am	MNZ	LEC	SPA; 6H; 23	SPA; 12H; 47	**SPA**; **24H**; Ret	NÜR	CAT	26th	10
2022	Jota Sport	McLaren 720S GT3	Pro	IMO; 10	LEC; Ret	SPA; 6H; 9	SPA; 12H; 7	SPA; 24H; 8	HOC; Ret	CAT; 10	27th	10
2023	Garage 59	McLaren 720S GT3 Evo	Pro	MNZ; 19	LEC; 12	SPA; 6H; 10	SPA; 12H; 59†	SPA; 24H; Ret	NÜR; 13	CAT; 8	24th	4
2024	Garage 59	McLaren 720S GT3 Evo	Bronze	LEC	SPA; 6H; 46	SPA; 12H; 42	**SPA**; **24H**; 39	NÜR	MNZ		40th	1
2024	Garage 59	McLaren 720S GT3 Evo	Pro							JED; 16	NC	0
2025	Garage 59	McLaren 720S GT3 Evo	Pro	LEC; Ret	MNZ; 2	SPA; 6H; 22	SPA; 12H; 4	**SPA**; **24H**; 6	NÜR; 8	CAT; Ret	7th	39
2026	Garage 59	McLaren 720S GT3 Evo	Pro	LEC; 5	MNZ; Ret	SPA; 6H; 13	SPA; 12H; Ret	SPA; 24H; Ret	NÜR; 10	ALG	18th	13

^{*} Season still in progress.

==== GT World Challenge Europe Sprint Cup ====
(key) (Races in bold indicate pole position) (Races in italics indicate fastest lap)

Year	Team	Car	Class	1	2	3	4	5	6	7	8	9	10	Pos.	Points
2019	R-Motorsport	Aston Martin Vantage AMR GT3	Pro	BRH; 1; 7	BRH; 2; 5	MIS; 1; 4	MIS; 2; 13	ZAN; 1; 7	ZAN; 2; 18	NÜR; 1; 7	NÜR; 2; 1	HUN; 1; 10	HUN; 2; 19	8th	39.5
2025	Garage 59	McLaren 720S GT3 Evo	Pro	BRH; 1; 2	BRH; 2; 6	ZAN; 1; 6	ZAN; 2; 4	MIS; 1; 5	**MIS**; **2**; 1	MAG; 1; 9	**MAG**; **2**; 1	VAL; 1 Ret	VAL; 2; 3	3rd	80
2026	Garage 59	McLaren 720S GT3 Evo	Pro	BRH; 1; 11	BRH; 2; 5	MIS; 1; 13	MIS; 2; 7	MAG; 1; 5	MAG; 2; 7	ZAN; 1; 20	ZAN; 2; 13	CAT; 1	CAT; 2	16th	18

=== Complete British GT Championship results ===
(key) (Races in bold indicate pole position) (Races in italics indicate fastest lap)

Year	Team	Car	Class	1	2	3	4	5	6	7	8	9	DC	Points
2022	Garage 59	McLaren 720S GT3	GT3	OUL; 1	OUL; 2	SIL; 1; 2	DON; 1	SNE; 1	SNE; 2	SPA; 1	BRH; 1	DON; 1	NC†	0†
2023	Garage 59	McLaren 720S GT3	GT3	OUL; 1; 11	OUL; 2; 3	SIL; 1; 33	DON; 1 Ret	SNE; 1; 16	SNE; 2 WD	**ALG**; **1** Ret	BRH; 1		16th	24
2023	Optimum Motorsport	McLaren 720S GT3	GT3									DON; 1; 7	16th	24
2025	Optimum Motorsport	McLaren 720S GT3 Evo	GT3	DON; 1; 4	**SIL**; **1**; 3	OUL; 1; 8	OUL; 2; 5	SPA; 1; 2	SNE; 1; 9	SNE; 2; 4	BRH; 1; 2	DON; 1 Ret	7th	127

^{†} As Kirchhöfer was a guest driver he was ineligible to score points. ^{*} Season still in progress.

=== Complete IMSA SportsCar Championship results ===
(key) (Races in bold indicate pole position) (Races in italics indicate fastest lap)

Year	Team	Class	Make	Engine	1	2	3	4	5	6	7	8	9	10	11	Pos.	Points
2023	Inception Racing	GTD	McLaren 720S GT3	McLaren M840T 4.0 L Turbo V8	DAY; 3	SEB	LBH	LGA	WGL	MOS	LIM	ELK	VIR	IMS	PET	48th	326
2024	Pfaff Motorsports	GTD Pro	McLaren 720S GT3 Evo	McLaren M840T 4.0 L Turbo V8	DAY; 10	SEB; 12	LGA; 2	DET; 8	WGL; 2	MOS; 6	ELK; 7	VIR; 5	IMS; 10	PET; 9		7th	2689
2025	AWA	GTD	Chevrolet Corvette Z06 GT3.R	Chevrolet LT6.R 5.5 L V8	DAY; 1	SEB	LBH									55th	365
2025	Vasser Sullivan Racing	GTD Pro	Lexus RC F GT3	Toyota 2UR-GSE 5.0 L V8				LGA; 7	DET	WGL	MOS	ELK	VIR	IMS	PET	31st	263
2026	Corvette Racing by Pratt Miller Motorsports	GTD Pro	Chevrolet Corvette Z06 GT3.R	Chevrolet LT6.R 5.5 L V8	**DAY**; 13	SEB; 4	LGA	DET	WGL	MOS	ELK	VIR	IMS	PET; 8		18th	779

=== Complete International GT Open results ===
(key) (Races in bold indicate pole position) (Races in italics indicate fastest lap)

Year	Team	Car	Class	1	2	3	4	5	6	7	8	9	10	11	12	13	14	Pos.	Points
2025	Garage 59	McLaren 720S GT3 Evo	Pro	ALG; 1	ALG; 2	SPA; 1	**HOC**; **1**; 1	**HOC**; **2**; 1	HUN; 1	HUN; 2	LEC; 1	LEC; 2	RBR; 1	RBR; 2	CAT; 1	CAT; 2	MNZ; 1	11th	30

=== Complete FIA World Endurance Championship results ===
(key) (Races in bold indicate pole position) (Races in italics indicate fastest lap)

Year	Entrant	Class	Car	Engine	1	2	3	4	5	6	7	8	Rank	Points
2026	Garage 59	LMGT3	McLaren 720S GT3 Evo	McLaren M840T 4.0 L Turbo V8	**IMO**; 13	SPA; 1	LMS; 8	SÃO; 16	COA; 17	FUJ; 8	**CAT**; 2	MNZ; 13	12th	57

=== 24 Hours of Le Mans results ===
Year	Team	Co-Drivers	Car	Class	Laps	Pos.	Class Pos.
2026	(United Kingdom) Garage 59	(Hong Kong) Antares Au (United Kingdom) Tom Fleming	McLaren 720S GT3 Evo	LMGT3	332	44th	12th

Sporting positions
Preceded by Pascal Wehrlein	ADAC Formel Masters; Champion; 2012	Succeeded by Alessio Picariello
Preceded by Jimmy Eriksson	German Formula Three; Champion; 2013	Succeeded by Markus Pommer
