= 2013 German Formula Three Championship =

The 2013 ATS Formel 3 Cup was the 11th edition of the German F3 Cup (German Formula Three Championship) in motorsport. The season began on 27 April at Oschersleben and finished on 29 September at Hockenheim after nine race weekends, with 26 races – one race at the Nürburgring was cancelled – completed in total. The championship was dominated by Marvin Kirchhöfer in his debut year finishing with 25 podiums including 13 wins.

== Teams and drivers ==
Team	Chassis	Engine	No.	Driver	Status	Rounds
Cup Class
(Germany) Lotus	Dallara F311/002	VW Power Engine	1	(Russia) Artem Markelov		All
(Germany) Lotus	Dallara F308/098	VW Power Engine	2	(United Kingdom) Emil Bernstorff		All
(Germany) Lotus	Dallara F308/099	VW Power Engine	3	(Germany) Marvin Kirchhöfer	R	All
(Germany) Lotus	Dallara F308/096	VW Power Engine	4	(United Kingdom) Sheban Siddiqi		All
(Netherlands) Van Amersfoort Racing	Dallara F308/007	VW Power Engine	5	(United States) Gustavo Menezes	R	All
(Netherlands) Van Amersfoort Racing	Dallara F308/006	VW Power Engine	12	(Belgium) Jordi Weckx		1–6, 9
(Sweden) Performance Racing	Dallara F308/092	VW Power Engine	7	(Russia) Roman Beregech	R	9
(Sweden) Performance Racing	Dallara F310/002	VW Power Engine	8	(Sweden) John Bryant-Meisner	R	All
(Sweden) Performance Racing	Dallara F308/092	VW Power Engine	9	(Austria) Thomas Jäger	R	1–6
(Sweden) Performance Racing	Dallara F308/020	VW Power Engine	10	(Switzerland) Yannick Mettler		1–3
(Sweden) Performance Racing	Dallara F308/020	VW Power Engine	11	(Poland) Tomasz Krzeminski	R	7–9
(Italy) EuroInternational	Dallara F308/057	VW Power Engine	13	(Malaysia) Nabil Jeffri	R	All
(Italy) EuroInternational	Dallara F311/001	VW Power Engine	14	(South Africa) Aston Hare	R	1
(Italy) ADM Motorsport	Dallara F308/029	VW Power Engine	16	(Italy) Matteo Cairoli	R	All
(Italy) ADM Motorsport	Dallara F308/014	VW Power Engine	17	(Poland) Tomasz Krzeminski	R	1–3
(Italy) ADM Motorsport	Dallara F308/014	VW Power Engine	18	(Italy) Luca Iannacone		6
(Italy) ADM Motorsport	Dallara F308/014	VW Power Engine	19	(Russia) Nikita Zlobin	R	7–9
(Germany) JBR Motorsport & Engineering	Dallara F09/023	VW Power Engine	23	(Denmark) Nicolai Sylvest	R	7, 9
Trophy Class
(Switzerland) Aberer Motorsport	Dallara F306/034	Volkswagen	51	(Austria) Michael Aberer		5
(Switzerland) Aberer Motorsport	Dallara F306/034	Volkswagen	52	(Italy) Luca Iannacone		1–2
(Germany) TTCmotorsport	Dallara F305/002	Mercedes	52	(Italy) Luca Iannacone		4–5
(Germany) Rennsport Rössler	Dallara F305/024	OPC-Challenge	52	(Italy) Luca Iannacone		8
(Germany) Rennsport Rössler	Dallara F305/024	OPC-Challenge	55	(Switzerland) Jan Schwitter	R	3
(Austria) Franz Wöss Racing	Dallara F302/044	OPC-Challenge	52	(Italy) Luca Iannacone		9
(Austria) Franz Wöss Racing	Dallara F305/062	OPC-Challenge	57	(Germany) Maximilian Hackl		1–7, 9
(Austria) Franz Wöss Racing	Dallara F305/040	OPC-Challenge	58	(Austria) Christopher Höher		7
(Austria) Franz Wöss Racing	Dallara F308/052	OPC-Challenge	59	(Austria) Stefan Neuburger		7
(Germany) GU-Racing	Dallara F305/034	OPC-Challenge	62	(Germany) Freddy Killensberger	R	All
(Germany) GU-Racing	Dallara F308/074	Mercedes	63	(Germany) Sebastian Balthasar	R	All
(Germany) TTCmotorsport	Dallara F305/030	Mercedes	64	(Germany) Hubertus-Carlos Vier	R	1–5, 9
(Germany) CR Racing Team	Dallara F305/063	OPC-Challenge	66	(Germany) Andreas Germann		2–9
(Germany) CR Racing Team	Dallara F308/030	Mercedes	77	(Germany) Christian Zeller		2–3, 5–6, 9
(Germany) CR Racing Team	Dallara F305/011	Mercedes	85	(Switzerland) Thomas Amweg		6, 9
(Germany) CR Racing Team	Dallara F303/021	OPC-Challenge	88	(Germany) Thomas Warken		2–3, 5
(Germany) CR Racing Team	Dallara F303/006	Opel	99	(Germany) Frank Debruyne		7, 9
(Switzerland) Jo Zeller Racing	Dallara F305/011	Mercedes	85	(Switzerland) Thomas Amweg		3

Icon	Status
R	Rookie

== Race calendar and results ==
On 28 January 2013, the final version of the 2013 calendar was released with nine triple-header meetings. With the exception of a round at Circuit de Spa-Francorchamps, all rounds took place on German soil. The series was part of the ADAC Masters Weekend package six times, with additional rounds in support of the 24 Hours Nürburgring, and Deutsche Tourenwagen Masters events at the Lausitzring and Oschersleben.

Round		Circuit	Date	Pole position	Fastest lap	Winning driver	Winning team	Secondary Class winner
1	R1	Motorsport Arena Oschersleben	27 April	(Germany) Marvin Kirchhöfer	(Germany) Marvin Kirchhöfer	(Germany) Marvin Kirchhöfer	(Germany) Lotus	T: (Germany) Sebastian Balthasar; R: (Germany) Marvin Kirchhöfer; DMSB: (Germany) Marvin Kirchhöfer
1	R2	Motorsport Arena Oschersleben	27 April		(Russia) Artem Markelov	(Sweden) John Bryant-Meisner	(Sweden) Performance Racing	T: (Germany) Sebastian Balthasar; R: (Sweden) John Bryant-Meisner; DMSB: (Germany) Marvin Kirchhöfer
1	R3	Motorsport Arena Oschersleben	28 April	(Germany) Marvin Kirchhöfer	(Germany) Marvin Kirchhöfer	(Germany) Marvin Kirchhöfer	(Germany) Lotus	T: (Germany) Sebastian Balthasar; R: (Germany) Marvin Kirchhöfer; DMSB: (Germany) Marvin Kirchhöfer
2	R1	Circuit de Spa-Francorchamps	11 May	(Germany) Marvin Kirchhöfer	(Germany) Marvin Kirchhöfer	(Germany) Marvin Kirchhöfer	(Germany) Lotus	T: (Germany) Freddy Killensberger; R: (Germany) Marvin Kirchhöfer; DMSB: (Germany) Marvin Kirchhöfer
2	R2	Circuit de Spa-Francorchamps	11 May		(United States) Gustavo Menezes	(Sweden) John Bryant-Meisner	(Sweden) Performance Racing	T: (Germany) Freddy Killensberger; R: (Sweden) John Bryant-Meisner; DMSB: (Germany) Marvin Kirchhöfer
2	R3	Circuit de Spa-Francorchamps	12 May	(Germany) Marvin Kirchhöfer	(United Kingdom) Emil Bernstorff	(United Kingdom) Emil Bernstorff	(Germany) Lotus	T: (Germany) Hubertus-Carlos Vier; R: (Germany) Marvin Kirchhöfer; DMSB: (Germany) Marvin Kirchhöfer
3	R1	Nürburgring	18 May	(United Kingdom) Emil Bernstorff	(Germany) Marvin Kirchhöfer	(United Kingdom) Emil Bernstorff	(Germany) Lotus	T: (Germany) Hubertus-Carlos Vier; R: (Germany) Marvin Kirchhöfer; DMSB: (Germany) Marvin Kirchhöfer
3	R2	Nürburgring	18 May	Race cancelled (Note: The second race at the Nürburgring was cancelled, after fog forced alterations to the support schedule for the 24 Hours Nürburgring.)				
3	R3	Nürburgring	19 May	(United Kingdom) Emil Bernstorff	(United Kingdom) Emil Bernstorff	(Germany) Marvin Kirchhöfer	(Germany) Lotus	T: (Germany) Freddy Killensberger; R: (Germany) Marvin Kirchhöfer; DMSB: (Germany) Marvin Kirchhöfer
4	R1	Sachsenring	8 June	(Germany) Marvin Kirchhöfer	(Germany) Marvin Kirchhöfer	(Germany) Marvin Kirchhöfer	(Germany) Lotus	T: (Germany) Hubertus-Carlos Vier; R: (Germany) Marvin Kirchhöfer; DMSB: (Germany) Marvin Kirchhöfer
4	R2	Sachsenring	8 June		(United Kingdom) Emil Bernstorff	(United Kingdom) Emil Bernstorff	(Germany) Lotus	T: (Germany) Sebastian Balthasar; R: (Germany) Marvin Kirchhöfer; DMSB: (Germany) Marvin Kirchhöfer
4	R3	Sachsenring	9 June	(Germany) Marvin Kirchhöfer	(Germany) Marvin Kirchhöfer	(Germany) Marvin Kirchhöfer	(Germany) Lotus	T: (Germany) Sebastian Balthasar; R: (Germany) Marvin Kirchhöfer; DMSB: (Germany) Marvin Kirchhöfer
5	R1	Lausitzring	15 June	(Germany) Marvin Kirchhöfer	(Germany) Marvin Kirchhöfer	(United Kingdom) Emil Bernstorff	(Germany) Lotus	T: (Germany) Sebastian Balthasar; R: (Germany) Marvin Kirchhöfer; DMSB: (Germany) Marvin Kirchhöfer
5	R2	Lausitzring	15 June		(United Kingdom) Emil Bernstorff	(United States) Gustavo Menezes	(Netherlands) Van Amersfoort Racing	T: (Germany) Hubertus-Carlos Vier; R: (United States) Gustavo Menezes; DMSB: (Germany) Marvin Kirchhöfer
5	R3	Lausitzring	16 June	(Germany) Marvin Kirchhöfer	(Russia) Artem Markelov	(Germany) Marvin Kirchhöfer	(Germany) Lotus	T: (Germany) Sebastian Balthasar; R: (Germany) Marvin Kirchhöfer; DMSB: (Germany) Marvin Kirchhöfer
6	R1	Nürburgring	3 August	(United Kingdom) Emil Bernstorff	(Germany) Marvin Kirchhöfer	(United Kingdom) Emil Bernstorff	(Germany) Lotus	(Switzerland) Thomas Amweg; R: (Germany) Marvin Kirchhöfer; DMSB: (Germany) Marvin Kirchhöfer
6	R2	Nürburgring	3 August		(Germany) Marvin Kirchhöfer	(Austria) Thomas Jäger	(Sweden) Performance Racing	T: (Germany) Sebastian Balthasar; R: (Austria) Thomas Jäger; DMSB: (Germany) Marvin Kirchhöfer
6	R3	Nürburgring	4 August	(Germany) Marvin Kirchhöfer	(Germany) Marvin Kirchhöfer	(Germany) Marvin Kirchhöfer	(Germany) Lotus	T: (Germany) Freddy Killensberger; R: (Germany) Marvin Kirchhöfer; DMSB: (Germany) Marvin Kirchhöfer
7	R1	Lausitzring	31 August	(United Kingdom) Emil Bernstorff (Note: Marvin Kirchhöfer recorded the fastest times in qualifying for the races at Lausitzring, but started last after he failed post-qualifying scrutineering. Emil Bernstorff was recognised as the pole-sitter for the race.)	(Germany) Marvin Kirchhöfer	(Russia) Artem Markelov	(Germany) Lotus	T: (Germany) Sebastian Balthasar; R: (Germany) Marvin Kirchhöfer; DMSB: (Germany) Marvin Kirchhöfer
7	R2	Lausitzring	31 August		(Germany) Marvin Kirchhöfer	(Germany) Marvin Kirchhöfer	(Germany) Lotus	T: (Germany) Freddy Killensberger; R: (Germany) Marvin Kirchhöfer; DMSB: (Germany) Marvin Kirchhöfer
7	R3	Lausitzring	1 September	(United Kingdom) Emil Bernstorff	(Germany) Marvin Kirchhöfer	(Russia) Artem Markelov	(Germany) Lotus	T: (Germany) Sebastian Balthasar; R: (Germany) Marvin Kirchhöfer; DMSB: (Germany) Marvin Kirchhöfer
8	R1	Motorsport Arena Oschersleben	14 September	(Germany) Marvin Kirchhöfer	(Germany) Marvin Kirchhöfer	(Germany) Marvin Kirchhöfer	(Germany) Lotus	T: (Germany) Sebastian Balthasar; R: (Germany) Marvin Kirchhöfer; DMSB: (Germany) Marvin Kirchhöfer
8	R2	Motorsport Arena Oschersleben	14 September		(Germany) Marvin Kirchhöfer	(United Kingdom) Emil Bernstorff	(Germany) Lotus	T: (Germany) Sebastian Balthasar; R: (Germany) Marvin Kirchhöfer; DMSB: (Germany) Marvin Kirchhöfer
8	R3	Motorsport Arena Oschersleben	15 September	(Germany) Marvin Kirchhöfer	(Germany) Marvin Kirchhöfer	(Germany) Marvin Kirchhöfer	(Germany) Lotus	T: (Germany) Sebastian Balthasar; R: (Germany) Marvin Kirchhöfer; DMSB: (Germany) Marvin Kirchhöfer
9	R1	Hockenheimring	28 September	(Germany) Marvin Kirchhöfer	(Germany) Marvin Kirchhöfer	(Germany) Marvin Kirchhöfer	(Germany) Lotus	(Switzerland) Thomas Amweg; R: (Germany) Marvin Kirchhöfer; DMSB: (Germany) Marvin Kirchhöfer
9	R2	Hockenheimring	28 September		(United States) Gustavo Menezes	(United States) Gustavo Menezes	(Netherlands) Van Amersfoort Racing	T: (Switzerland) Thomas Amweg; R: (United States) Gustavo Menezes; DMSB: (Germany) Marvin Kirchhöfer
9	R3	Hockenheimring	29 September	(Germany) Marvin Kirchhöfer	(United Kingdom) Emil Bernstorff	(Germany) Marvin Kirchhöfer	(Germany) Lotus	T: (Germany) Sebastian Balthasar; R: (Germany) Marvin Kirchhöfer; DMSB: (Germany) Marvin Kirchhöfer

== Championship standings ==
=== Cup ===
- Only cars released in 2008–2011 equipped with Volkswagen Power Engine are eligible for Cup standings. Points are awarded as follows:

	1	2	3	4	5	6	7	8	9	10	PP	FL
Race 1	25	18	15	12	10	8	6	4	2	1	**3**	2
Race 2	10	8	6	5	4	3	2	1	0	0	**0**	2
Race 3	25	18	15	12	10	8	6	4	2	1	**0**	2

Pos	Driver	OSC1			SPA			NÜR1			SAC			LAU1			NÜR2			LAU2			OSC2			HOC			Pts
1	(Germany) Marvin Kirchhöfer	**1**	4	**1**	**1**	3	**3**	2	C	1	**1**	2	**1**	**2**	3	**1**	2	2	**1**	3	1	2	**1**	2	**1**	**1**	3	**1**	511
2	(Russia) Artem Markelov	2	2	2	6	2	2	3	C	2	2	3	2	3	4	3	3	3	2	1	2	1	Ret	13	4	3	2	3	339
3	(United Kingdom) Emil Bernstorff	12	5	3	4	5	1	**1**	C	**3**	3	1	10	1	6	2	**1**	4	4	**2**	Ret	**5**	4	1	5	2	4	2	334
4	(United States) Gustavo Menezes	3	6	6	3	4	7	7	C	7	15†	7	3	5	1	4	4	8	3	4	4	4	3	7	2	5	1	4	241
5	(Sweden) John Bryant-Meisner	6	1	4	2	1	4	4	C	4	DNS	8	Ret	6	5	7	5	6	Ret	5	Ret	3	2	4	3	4	5	5	215
6	(Austria) Thomas Jäger	14	3	5	Ret	6	5	5	C	5	4	Ret	Ret	4	2	6	6	1	5										117
7	(Italy) Matteo Cairoli	7	8	Ret	Ret	11	8	8	C	9	5	6	4	9	7	5	7	5	7	8	3	7	8	3	7	16†	7	7	112
8	(Malaysia) Nabil Jeffri	9	10	9	7	7	19†	17	C	8	14	5	6	7	8	9	10	7	6	9	6	9	6	5	8	6	Ret	DNS	79
9	(Poland) Tomasz Krzeminski	5	7	11	9	8	9	9	C	10										6	5	6	5	6	6	Ret	10	6	69
10	(Germany) Sebastian Balthasar	8	13	8	12	15	13	13	C	13	8	4	5	8	DSQ	10	9	9	Ret	7	Ret	8	7	8	9	15	14	11	54
11	(Switzerland) Yannick Mettler	4	9	13	5	Ret	6	6	C	6																			46
12	(Belgium) Jordi Weckx	DNS	DNS	DNS	8	12	10	19	C	11	6	9	Ret	13	9	8	11	11	9							7	6	10	29
13	(Germany) Hubertus-Carlos Vier	11	11	15	16	10	11	10	C	17	7	Ret	7	10	10	18										12	11	16	14
14	(Germany) Freddy Killensberger	10	15	10	10	9	15	11	C	12	9	10	8	11	18	DNS	12	12	8	Ret	9	13	10	9	11	13	12	12	14
15	(Denmark) Nicolai Sylvest																			12	7	11				9	8	9	11
16	(South Africa) Aston Hare	Ret	Ret	7																									6
17	(Switzerland) Thomas Amweg							Ret	C	16							8	10	12							10	9	13	6
18	(United Kingdom) Sheban Siddiqi	13	12	12	11	13	12	12	C	15	11	11	11	12	11	11	13	16	10	Ret	DNS	DNS	9	Ret	10	11	13	15	5
19	(Germany) Maximilian Hackl	Ret	14	14	13	14	14	15	C	18	10	12	9	Ret	14	12	14	13	11	Ret	DNS	DNS				14	20†	DNS	3
20	(Russia) Nikita Zlobin																			10	8	10	Ret	10	12	Ret	15	14	3
21	(Austria) Christopher Höher																			11	10	12							0
22	(Italy) Luca Iannaccone	Ret	16	16	DNS	DNS	DNS				12	14	12	16	16	17	17	15	15				11	12	14	20	18	20	0
23	(Germany) Andreas Germann				Ret	18	17	20	C	21	13	13	13	17	17	15	16	14	14	14	13	14	12	11	13	18	17	17	0
24	(Austria) Stefan Neuburger																			13	11	15							0
25	(Germany) Christian Zeller				14	17	18	18	C	20				14	12	13	15	17	13							17	16	18	0
26	(Germany) Frank Debruyne																			16	12	Ret				19	19	19	0
27	(Germany) Thomas Warken				15	16	16	16	C	19				15	13	16													0
28	(Switzerland) Jan Schwitter							14	C	14																			0
29	(Austria) Michael Aberer													DNS	15	14													0
Guest driver ineligible for points
	(Russia) Roman Beregech																									8	Ret	8	0
Pos	Driver	OSC1			SPA			NÜR1			SAC			LAU1			NÜR2			LAU2			OSC2			HOC			Pts

Colour	Result
Gold	Winner
Silver	Second place
Bronze	Third place
Green	Points classification
Blue	Non-points classification
Blue	Non-classified finish (NC)
Purple	Retired, not classified (Ret)
Red	Did not qualify (DNQ)
Red	Did not pre-qualify (DNPQ)
Black	Disqualified (DSQ)
White	Did not start (DNS)
White	Withdrew (WD)
White	Race cancelled (C)
Blank	Did not practice (DNP)
Blank	Did not arrive (DNA)
Blank	Excluded (EX)

**Bold** – Pole
Italics – Fastest Lap

- † — Drivers did not finish the race, but were classified as they completed over 90% of the race distance.

=== Trophy ===
- Only cars released in 2002–2011 without Volkswagen Power Engine are eligible for Trophy standings.

Pos	Driver	OSC1			SPA			NÜR1			SAC			LAU1			NÜR2			LAU2			OSC2			HOC			Pts
1	(Germany) Sebastian Balthasar	8	13	8	12	15	13	13	C	13	8	4	5	8	DSQ	10	9	9	Ret	7	Ret	8	7	8	9	15	14	11	415
2	(Germany) Freddy Killensberger	10	15	10	10	9	15	11	C	12	9	10	8	11	18	DNS	12	12	8	Ret	9	13	10	9	11	13	12	12	339
3	(Germany) Hubertus-Carlos Vier	11	11	15	16	10	11	10	C	17	7	Ret	7	10	10	18										12	11	16	226
4	(Germany) Maximilian Hackl	Ret	14	14	13	14	14	15	C	18	10	12	9	Ret	14	12	14	13	11	Ret	DNS	DNS				14	20†	DNS	175
5	(Germany) Andreas Germann				Ret	18	17	20	C	21	13	13	13	17	17	15	16	14	14	14	13	14	12	11	13	18	17	17	157
6	(Germany) Christian Zeller				14	17	18	18	C	20				14	12	13	15	17	13							17	16	18	111
7	(Switzerland) Thomas Amweg							Ret	C	16							8	10	12							10	9	13	110
8	(Italy) Luca Iannaccone	Ret	16	16	DNS	DNS	DNS				12	14	12	16	16	17							11	12	14	20	18	20	95
9	(Germany) Thomas Warken				15	16	16	16	C	19				15	13	16													62
10	(Austria) Christopher Höher																			11	10	12							44
11	(Austria) Stefan Neuburger																			13	11	15							31
12	(Switzerland) Jan Schwitter							14	C	14																			27
13	(Germany) Frank Debruyne																			15	12	Ret				19	19	19	26
14	(Austria) Michael Aberer													DNS	15	14													16
Pos	Driver	OSC1			SPA			NÜR1			SAC			LAU1			NÜR2			LAU2			OSC2			HOC			Pts

- † — Drivers did not finish the race, but were classified as they completed over 90% of the race distance.

=== SONAX Rookie-Pokal ===
Rookie drivers are only eligible for the SONAX Rookie-Pokal title if they have not previously competed in more than two events of national or international Formula 3 championship and not aged 26 in 2012.

Pos	Driver	OSC1			SPA			NÜR1			SAC			LAU1			NÜR2			LAU2			OSC2			HOC			Pts
1	(Germany) Marvin Kirchhöfer	1	4	1	1	3	3	2	C	1	1	2	1	2	3	1	2	2	1	3	1	2	1	2	1	1	3	1	516
2	(United States) Gustavo Menezes	3	6	6	3	4	7	7	C	7	15†	7	3	5	1	4	4	8	3	4	4	4	3	7	2	5	1	4	318
3	(Sweden) John Bryant-Meisner	6	1	4	2	1	4	4	C	4	DNS	8	Ret	6	5	7	5	6	Ret	5	Ret	3	2	4	3	4	5	5	283
4	(Italy) Matteo Cairoli	7	8	Ret	Ret	11	8	8	C	9	5	6	4	9	7	5	7	5	7	8	3	7	8	3	7	16†	7	7	194
5	(Austria) Thomas Jäger	14	3	5	Ret	6	5	5	C	5	4	Ret	Ret	4	2	6	6	1	5										167
6	(Malaysia) Nabil Jeffri	9	10	9	7	7	19†	17	C	8	14	5	6	7	8	9	10	7	6	9	6	9	6	5	8	6	Ret	DNS	157
7	(Germany) Sebastian Balthasar	8	13	8	12	15	13	13	C	13	8	4	5	8	DSQ	10	9	9	Ret	7	Ret	8	7	8	9	15	14	11	128
8	(Poland) Tomasz Krzeminski	5	7	11	9	8	9	9	C	10										6	5	6	5	6	6	Ret	10	6	128
9	(Germany) Freddy Killensberger	10	15	10	10	9	15	11	C	12	9	10	8	11	18	DNS	12	12	8	Ret	9	13	10	9	11	13	12	12	82
10	(Germany) Hubertus-Carlos Vier	11	11	15	16	10	11	10	C	17	7	Ret	7	10	10	18										12	11	16	62
11	(Denmark) Nicolai Sylvest																			12	7	11				9	8	9	29
12	(Russia) Nikita Zlobin																			10	8	10	Ret	10	12	Ret	15	14	14
13	(South Africa) Aston Hare	Ret	Ret	7																									10
14	(Switzerland) Jan Schwitter							14	C	14																			2
Pos	Driver	OSC1			SPA			NÜR1			SAC			LAU1			NÜR2			LAU2			OSC2			HOC			Pts

- † — Drivers did not finish the race, but were classified as they completed over 90% of the race distance.

=== Teams ===
Only the highest car from each team is eligible to teams' standings.

Pos	Driver	OSC1			SPA			NÜR1			SAC			LAU1			NÜR2			LAU2			OSC2			HOC			Pts
1	(Germany) Lotus	1	2	1	1	2	1	1	C	1	1	1	1	1	3	1	1	2	1	1	1	1	1	1	1	1	2	1	518
2	(Netherlands) Van Amersfoort Racing	3	6	6	3	4	7	7	C	7	6	7	3	5	1	4	4	8	3	4	4	4	3	7	2	5	1	4	341
3	(Sweden) Performance Racing	4	1	4	2	1	4	4	C	4	4	8	Ret	4	2	6	5	1	5	5	4	3	2	4	3	4	5	5	340
4	(Italy) ADM Motorsport	5	7	11	7	8	9	8	C	9	5	6	4	9	7	5	7	5	7	8	3	7	8	3	7	16	7	7	240
5	(Italy) EuroInternational	9	10	9	7	7	19	17	C	8	14	5	6	7	8	9	10	7	6	9	6	9	6	5	8	6	Ret	DNS	181
6	(Germany) GU-Racing	8	13	8	10	9	13	8	C	8	8	4	5	8	18	10	9	9	8	7	8	7	7	8	9	13	12	13	180
7	(Germany) / TTCmotorsport; (Germany) / ADAC Team Nordbayern e.V.	11	11	15	16	10	11	10	C	17	7	Ret	7	10	10	18										12	11	16	78
8	(Germany) CR Racing Team				14	16	16	16	C	19	13	13	13	14	12	13	8	10	12	14	12	14	12	11	13	10	9	13	74
9	(Austria) Franz Wöss Racing	Ret	14	14	13	14	14	15	C	18	10	12	9	Ret	14	12	14	13	11	11	10	12				14	18	20	72
10	(Germany) JBR Motorsport & Engineering																			12	7	11				9	8	9	37
11	(Germany) Rennsport Rössler							14	C	14													11	12	14				23
12	(Germany) TTCmotorsport										12	14	12	16	16	17													11
13	(Switzerland) Jo Zeller Racing							Ret	C	16																			4
14	(Switzerland) Aberer Motorsport	Ret	16	16	DNS	DNS	DNS							DNS	15	14													4
Pos	Driver	OSC1			SPA			NÜR1			SAC			LAU1			NÜR2			LAU2			OSC2			HOC			Pts

=== DMSB's standings ===
- Only for German drivers.

Pos	Driver	OSC1			SPA			NÜR1			SAC			LAU1			NÜR2			LAU2			OSC2			HOC			Pts
1	Marvin Kirchhöfer	**1**	4	**1**	**1**	3	**3**	**2**	C	**1**	**1**	2	**1**	**2**	3	**1**	**2**	2	**1**	3	1	**2**	**1**	2	**1**	**1**	3	**1**	604
2	Sebastian Balthasar	8	13	8	12	15	13	13	C	13	8	4	5	8	DSQ	10	9	9	Ret	**7**	Ret	8	7	8	9	15	14	11	322
3	Freddy Killensberger	10	15	10	10	9	15	11	C	12	9	10	8	11	18	DNS	12	12	8	Ret	9	13	10	9	11	13	12	12	281
4	Hubertus-Carlos Vier	11	11	15	16	10	11	10	C	17	7	Ret	7	10	10	18										12	11	16	192
5	Andreas Germann				Ret	18	17	20	C	21	13	13	13	17	17	15	16	14	14	14	13	14	12	11	13	18	17	17	156
6	Maximilian Hackl	Ret	14	14	13	14	14	15	C	18	10	12	9	Ret	14	12	14	13	11	Ret	DNS	DNS				14	20†	DNS	142
7	Christian Zeller				14	16	16	18	C	20				14	12	13	15	17	13							17	16	18	101
8	Thomas Warken				15	16	16	16	C	19				15	13	16													56
9	Frank Debruyne																			15	12	Ret				19	19	19	30
Pos	Driver	OSC1			SPA			NÜR1			SAC			LAU1			NÜR2			LAU2			OSC2			HOC			Pts

- † — Drivers did not finish the race, but were classified as they completed over 90% of the race distance.
