= Giorgio Roda =

Italian racing driver (born 1994) and successful racing driver

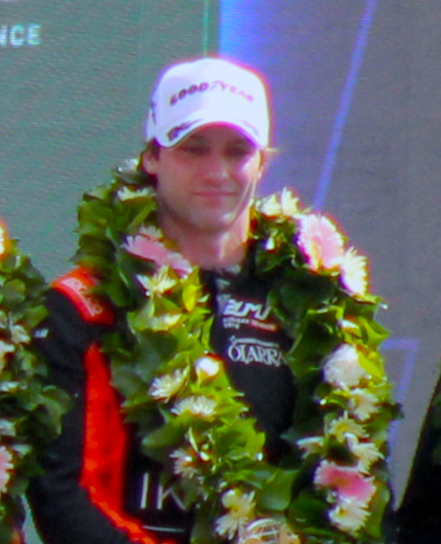
- Roda on the podium of the 2025 24 Hours of Le Mans
- Nationality: (Italy) Italian
- Born: March 18, 1994 (age 32) Como, Italy
- Relatives: Gianluca Roda (father); Davide Roda (uncle); Andrea Roda (brother)

FIA World Endurance Championship - LMGT3 career
- Debut season: 2018–19
- Current team: Proton Competition
- Categorisation: FIA Silver (until 2022); FIA Bronze (2023–)
- Car number: 88
- Starts: 12 (12 entries)
- Wins: 0
- Podiums: 0
- Poles: 1
- Fastest laps: 0
- Best finish: 17th in 2024

Giorgio Roda (born 18 March 1994) is an Italian racing driver who currently competes in the LMGT3 class of the FIA World Endurance Championship with Proton Competition. He has attained multiple successes in GT racing, winning the 2014 International GT Open in the GTS class, taking the European Le Mans Series title in LMGTE in 2018 and winning the 2020 Italian GT Endurance Championship.

His father Gianluca is also a racecar driver, as well as the owner of steel company Aceros Olarra.

== Career ==
Following a spell in karts, Roda made his car racing debut in 2011, driving for Cram Competition in the Formula Abarth Series. His debut season proved to be challenging, as Roda scored a best finish of ninth at Imola and ended up 19th in the Italian standings, but he would return with Prema Powerteam the following year. The Italian failed to score any podiums despite a smaller grid size, finishing ninth in both the Italian and European championships. For his third season in 2013 (a partial campaign) Roda returned to Cram, winning a race at Misano.

Roda moved into GT racing in 2014, driving for AF Corse in the GTS class of the International GT Open alongside a revolving cast of teammates. A successful season followed, with seven podiums, which included two class wins, earning Roda the GTS title. For 2015, Roda moved to AF Corse's European Le Mans Series squad, partnering Marco Cioci and Ilya Melnikov. The trio combined for a patchy season, failing to finish twice, though a win at the final round would bring them to fourth place in the standings.

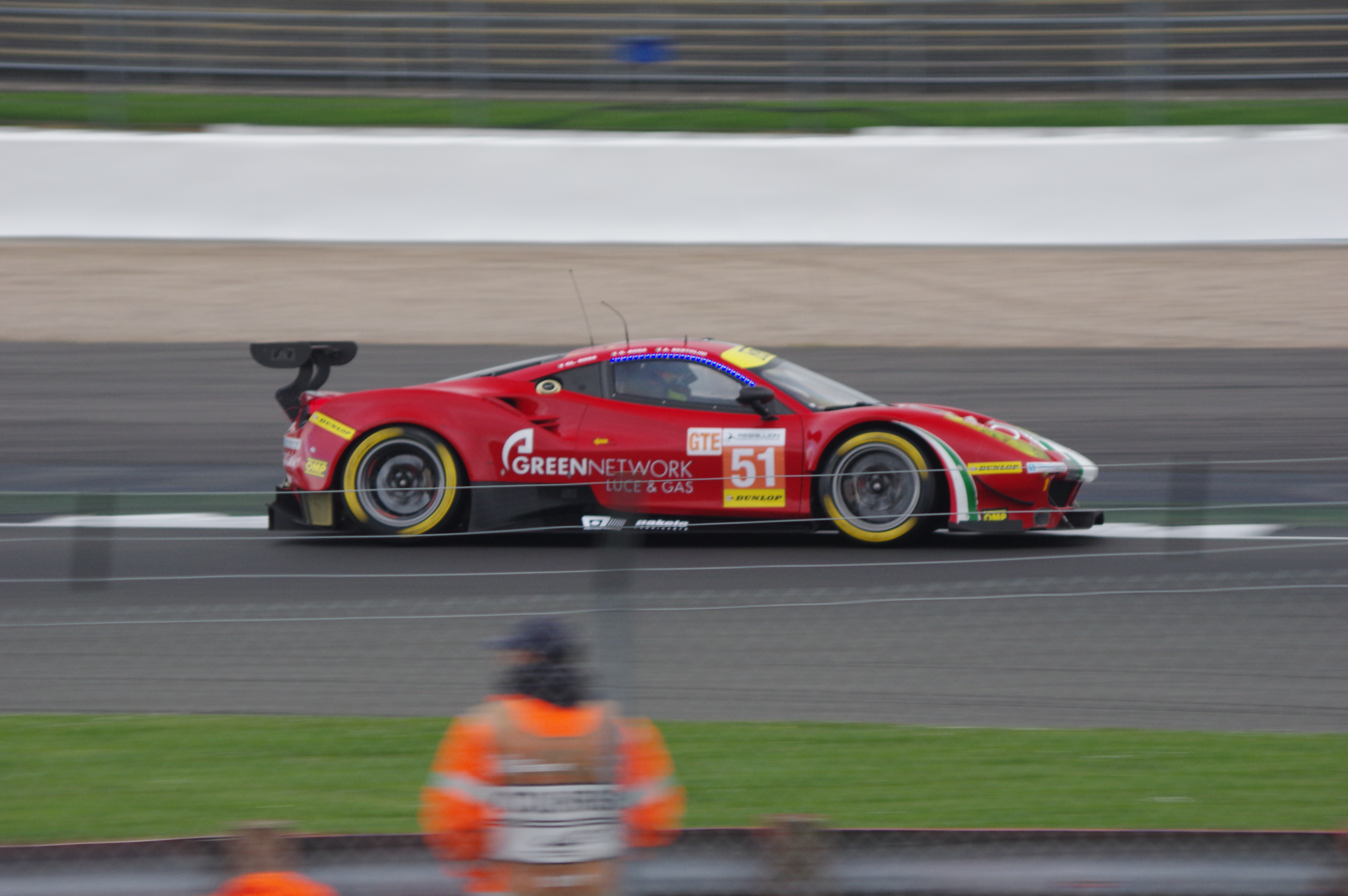
Roda at the wheel of his Spirit of Race Ferrari 488 GTE at Silverstone in 2017.

After a year out of racing, Roda returned to the ELMS in 2017, driving in the LMGTE category for Spirit of Race. Despite scoring a victory at Spa, Roda and his teammates ended the season last of all full-time entrants. A move to Proton Competition followed, with whom Roda would race in both the ELMS and the 2018–19 WEC season. Racing alongside his father Gianluca and pro driver Matteo Cairoli in the former, Roda would be part of a lineup that finished five of the six races on the podium, coming out on top in a title battle against JMW Motorsport. In the WEC "Super Season" however, a disqualification coupled with a points reset for the opening four rounds set the team back, as Roda ended his campaign 19th in the standings. During the pandemic-affected 2020 season, Roda raced in the Endurance category of the Italian GT series. Together with Ferrari drivers Alessio Rovera and Antonio Fuoco he would take two victories on their way to the championship.

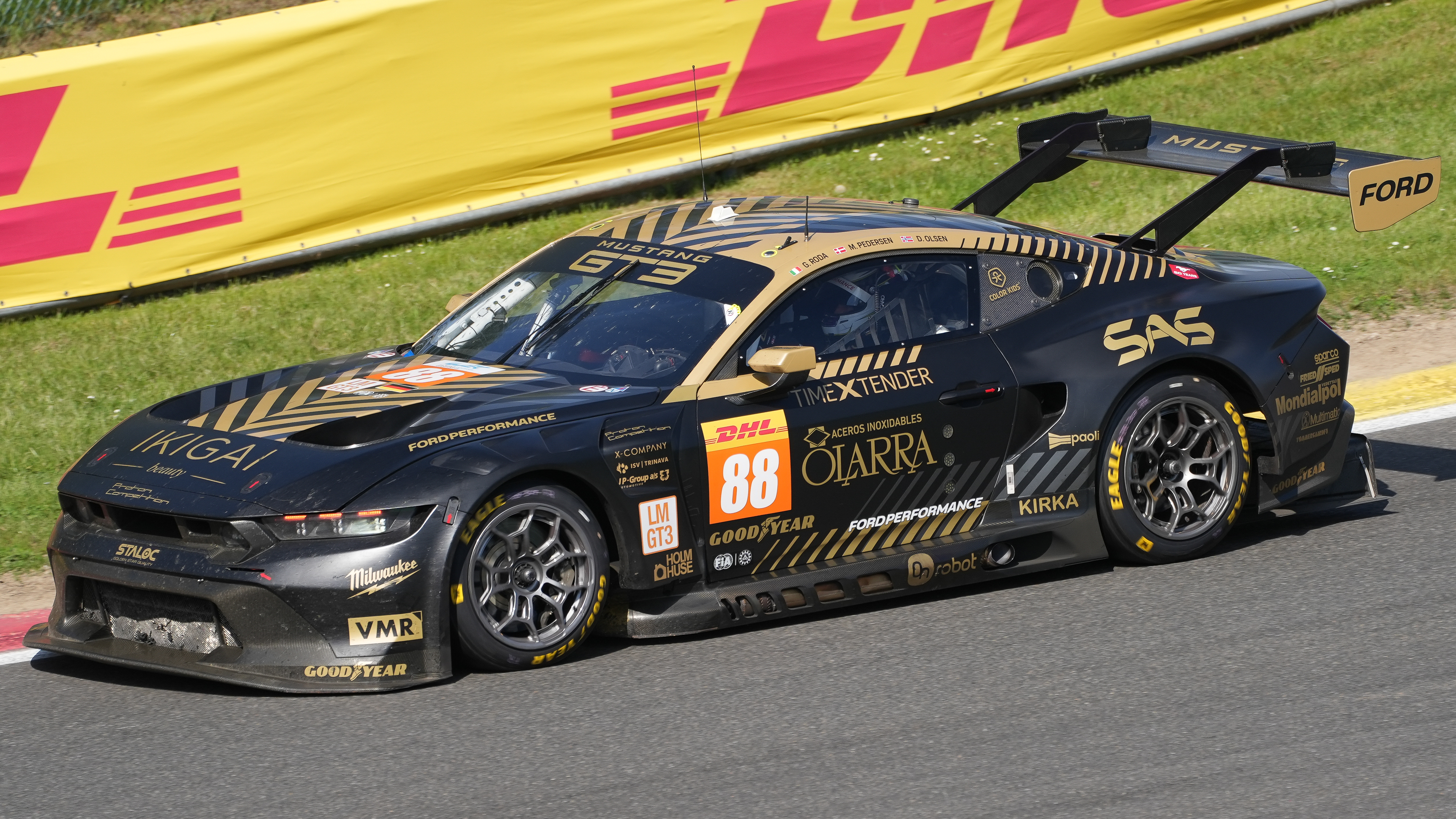
Roda's No. 88 Proton Competition Ford at Spa in 2024.

During the 2021 and 2022 seasons Roda moved into the SRO world, driving in the GT World Challenge Europe Endurance and Sprint Cups. These two years yielded little success for Roda, who was downgraded to an FIA Bronze rating ahead of 2023. That year, Roda switched into prototype racing, driving for Proton in the ELMS's LMP2 Pro-Am category. Having shown strong qualifying pace in the all-bronze sessions throughout the year, Roda took his maiden pole at Portimão. Having finished second in the LMP2 class of the Asian Le Mans Series during the winter, Roda remained in the ELMS in 2024 whilst also moving into the LMGT3 category of the WEC, partnering Dennis Olsen and Mikkel O. Pedersen in a Proton-fielded Ford Mustang GT3.

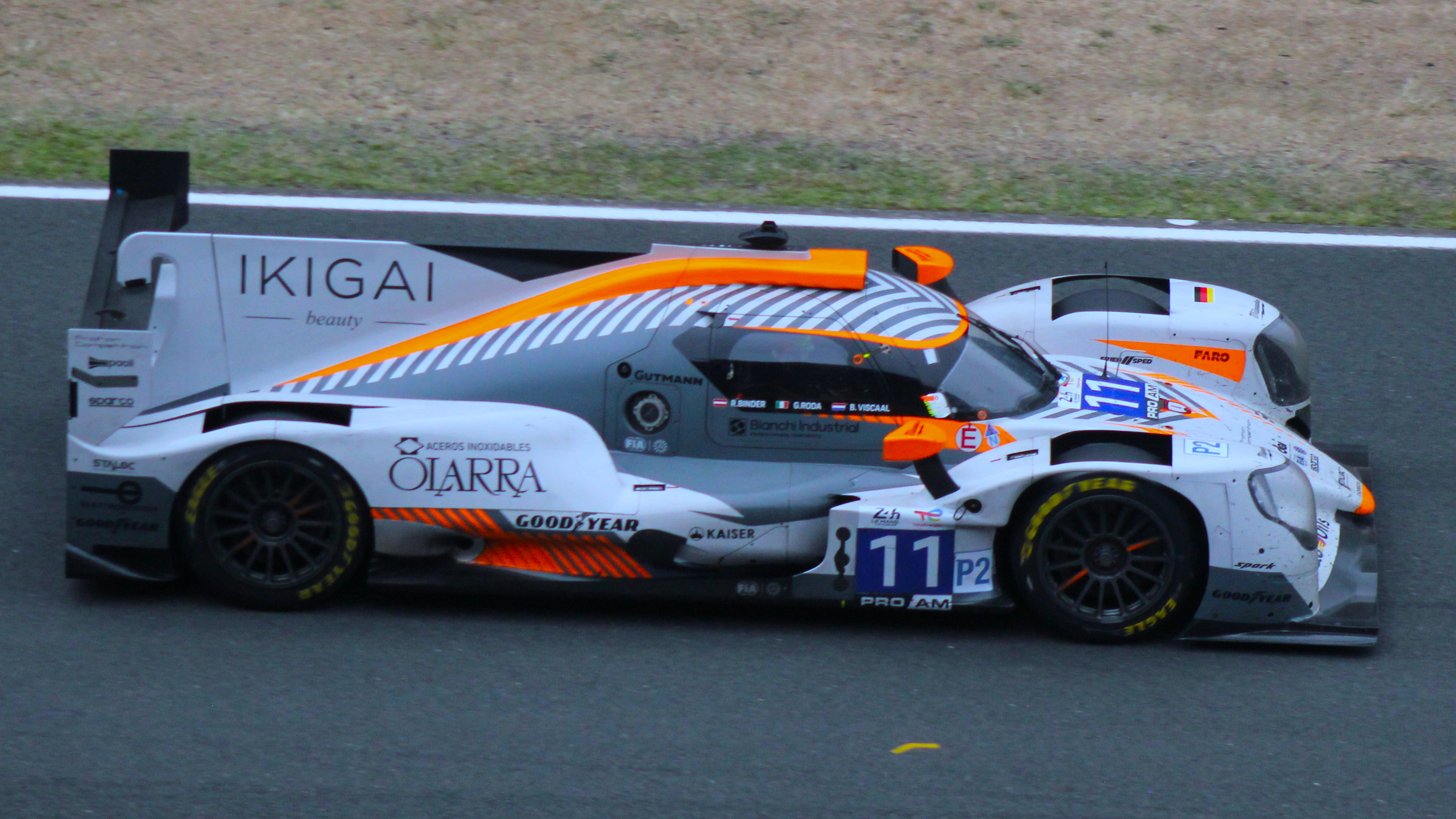
Roda's No. 11 Proton Competition LMP2 car at the 2025 24 Hours of Le Mans.

In 2025, Roda finished 6th with Proton driving in ELMS's LMP2 Pro-Am category, partnering with Bent Viscaal and René Binder. At Imola, Roda finished second from pole having to repair the car after contact with AO caused them to lose time. With the same drivers, he achieved a podium with Proton at Le Mans 2025. For the 2026 ELMS season, he transferred to Duqueine Team and has achieved two podiums with Doriane Pin and Richard Verschoor.

== Racing record ==
=== Racing career summary ===
Season	Series	Team	Races	Wins	Poles	F/Laps	Podiums	Points	Position
2011	Formula Abarth European Series	Cram Competition	12	0	0	0	0	0	27th
2011	Formula Abarth Italian Series	Cram Competition	14	0	0	0	0	4	19th
2011	Eurocup Formula Renault 2.0	Cram Competition	2	0	0	0	0	0	NC†
2012	Formula Abarth European Series	Prema Powerteam	21	0	0	0	0	72	9th
2012	Formula Abarth Italian Series	Prema Powerteam	15	0	0	0	0	46	9th
2012	Formula Renault 2.0 Alps Series	Cram Competition	2	0	0	0	0	0	42nd
2013	Formula Abarth Series	Cram Motorsport	9	1	0	0	3	73	6th
2014	International GT Open - GTS	AF Corse	16	2	0	0	7	86	**1st**
2015	European Le Mans Series - GTC	AF Corse	5	1	0	0	2	56	4th
2015	International GT Open - Pro-Am	AF Corse	2	0	0	0	0	3	18th
2017	European Le Mans Series - LMGTE	Spirit of Race	6	1	0	0	1	70	6th
2017	Blancpain GT Series Endurance Cup	GRT Grasser Racing Team	1	0	0	0	0	0	NC
2017	Gulf 12 Hours - GT	Kessel Racing TP12 HubAuto	1	0	0	0	0	N/A	5th
2018	European Le Mans Series - LMGTE	Proton Competition	6	1	0	0	5	95.5	**1st**
2018	24 Hours of Le Mans - LMGTE Am	Dempsey-Proton Racing	1	0	0	0	0	N/A	DNF
2018	Gulf 12 Hours - GT3	Attempto Racing	1	0	0	0	1	N/A	**3rd**
2018–19	FIA World Endurance Championship - LMGTE Am	Dempsey-Proton Racing	7	0	0	0	0	11	19th
2019	European Le Mans Series - LMGTE	Team Project 1	2	0	0	0	0	16	15th
2019	GT World Challenge Europe Sprint Cup	Dinamic Motorsport	2	0	0	0	0	0	NC
2019	FIA Motorsport Games GT Cup	Team Italy	3	0	0	0	0	N/A	DNF
2019	24 Hours of Le Mans - LMGTE Am	Dempsey-Proton Racing	1	0	0	0	0	N/A	DNF
2020	Italian GT Endurance Championship - GT3	AF Corse	4	2	1	0	2	47	**1st**
2020	Italian GT Sprint Championship - GT3	AF Corse	8	1	0	0	2	62	4th
2021	Asian Le Mans Series - GT Am	Kessel Racing	4	0	0	0	4	69	**3rd**
2021	GT World Challenge Europe Endurance Cup	Kessel Racing	5	0	0	0	0	0	NC
2021	GT World Challenge Europe Endurance Cup - Pro-Am	Kessel Racing	5	0	0	0	0	9	28th
2021	GT World Challenge Europe Sprint Cup	Sky - Tempesta Racing	8	0	0	0	0	0	NC
2021	GT World Challenge Europe Sprint Cup - Silver	Sky - Tempesta Racing	8	0	0	0	0	13	15th
2021	Italian GT Endurance Championship - GT3	AF Corse	1	0	0	0	0	0	NC†
2022	Asian Le Mans Series - GT	Dinamic Motorsport	4	0	0	0	0	5.5	13th
2022	GT World Challenge Europe Endurance Cup	Dinamic Motorsport	5	0	0	0	0	0	NC
2022	GT World Challenge Europe Endurance Cup - Silver	Dinamic Motorsport	5	0	0	0	0	21	16th
2022	GT World Challenge Europe Sprint Cup	Dinamic Motorsport	10	0	0	0	0	0	NC
2023	European Le Mans Series - LMP2 Pro-Am	Proton Competition	6	0	1	0	0	33	11th
2023–24	Asian Le Mans Series - LMP2	Proton Competition	5	0	0	0	3	71	**2nd**
2024	FIA World Endurance Championship - LMGT3	Proton Competition	5	0	0	0	1	37	17th
2024	24 Hours of Le Mans - LMGT3	Proton Competition	1	0	0	0	1	N/A	**3rd**
2024	European Le Mans Series - LMP2 Pro-Am	Proton Competition	6	1	5	0	4	95	**3rd**
2024	Gulf 12 Hours - Pro-Am	Kessel Racing	1	0	1	0	1	N/A	**3rd**
2024–25	Asian Le Mans Series - LMP2	Proton Competition	6	0	6	0	1	63	5th
2025	European Le Mans Series - LMP2 Pro-Am	Proton Competition	6	0	4	0	1	66	6th
2025	24 Hours of Le Mans - LMP2 Pro-Am	Proton Competition	1	0	0	0	1	N/A	**3rd**
2025–26	Asian Le Mans Series - LMP2	United Autosports	6	0	5	0	0	37	7th
2026	European Le Mans Series - LMP2 Pro-Am	Duqueine Team	6	0	3	0	2	67	4th
2026–27	Asian Le Mans Series - LMP2	United Autosports							

^{†} As Roda was a guest driver, he was ineligible to score points.^{*} Season still in progress.

=== Complete Eurocup Formula Renault 2.0 results ===
(key) (Races in bold indicate pole position; races in italics indicate fastest lap)

Year	Entrant	1	2	3	4	5	6	7	8	9	10	11	12	13	14	DC	Points
2011	Cram Competition	ALC; 1	ALC; 2	SPA; 1	SPA; 2	NÜR; 1	NÜR; 2	HUN; 1	HUN; 2	SIL; 1	SIL; 2	LEC; 1	LEC; 2	CAT; 1; 26	CAT; 2; 28	NC†	0

† As Roda was a guest driver, he was ineligible for points

=== Complete Formula Renault 2.0 Alps Series results ===
(key) (Races in bold indicate pole position; races in italics indicate fastest lap)

Year	Team	1	2	3	4	5	6	7	8	9	10	11	12	13	14	Pos	Points
2012	Cram Competition	MNZ; 1	MNZ; 2	PAU; 1	PAU; 2	IMO; 1	IMO; 2	SPA; 1	SPA; 2	RBR; 1	RBR; 2	MUG; 1	MUG; 2	CAT; 1; 24	CAT; 2; 19	42nd	0

=== Complete European Le Mans Series results ===
(key) (Races in bold indicate pole position; races in italics indicate fastest lap)

Year	Entrant	Class	Chassis	Engine	1	2	3	4	5	6	Rank	Points
2015	AF Corse	GTC	Ferrari 458 Italia GT3	Ferrari F136 4.5 L V8	SIL; Ret	**IMO**; 2	RBR; 4	LEC; Ret	EST; 1		4th	56
2017	Spirit of Race	LMGTE	Ferrari 488 GTE	Ferrari F154CB 3.9 L Turbo V8	SIL; 6	MNZ; 4	**RBR**; 4	LEC; 4	SPA; 1	ALG; Ret	6th	70
2018	Proton Competition	LMGTE	Porsche 911 RSR	Porsche 4.0 L Flat-6	**LEC**; 2	MNZ; 5	RBR; 1	SIL; 2	**SPA**; 3	ALG; 3	1st	95.5
2019	Team Project 1	LMGTE	Porsche 911 RSR	Porsche 4.0 L Flat-6	LEC; 8	MNZ; 4	CAT	SIL	SPA	ALG	15th	16
2023	Proton Competition	LMP2 Pro-Am	Oreca 07	Gibson GK428 4.2 L V8	CAT; 6	LEC; 6	ARA; 5	SPA; Ret	PRT; Ret	**ALG**; 7	11th	33
2024	Proton Competition	LMP2 Pro-Am	Oreca 07	Gibson GK428 4.2 L V8	**CAT**; 5	**LEC**; 2	**IMO**; 8	SPA; 2	**MUG**; 3	**ALG**; 1	3rd	95
2025	Proton Competition	LMP2 Pro-Am	Oreca 07	Gibson GK428 4.2 L V8	**CAT**; 4	LEC; 4	**IMO**; 2	**SPA**; 6	SIL; Ret	**ALG**; 4	6th	66
2026	Duqueine Team	LMP2 Pro-Am	Oreca 07	Gibson GK428 4.2 L V8	**CAT**; 3	LEC; 3	IMO; 7	SPA; 5	SIL; 4	ALG; 7	4th	67

=== Complete GT World Challenge Europe results ===
==== GT World Challenge Europe Endurance Cup ====
(key) (Races in bold indicate pole position; races in italics indicate fastest lap)

Year	Team	Car	Class	1	2	3	4	5	6	7	Pos.	Points
2017	GRT Grasser Racing Team	Lamborghini Huracán GT3	Pro	MNZ	SIL	LEC	SPA; 6H	SPA; 12H	SPA; 24H	CAT; 41	NC	0
2021	Kessel Racing	Ferrari 488 GT3 Evo 2020	Pro-Am	MNZ; Ret	LEC; 32	SPA; 6H; 52	SPA; 12H; 40	SPA; 24H; 32	NÜR; 33	CAT; 36	28th	9
2022	Dinamic Motorsport	Porsche 911 GT3 R	Silver	IMO; 29	LEC; 23	SPA; 6H; 33	SPA; 12H; 35	SPA; 24H; 25	HOC; 26	CAT; Ret	16th	21

==== GT World Challenge Europe Sprint Cup ====
(key) (Races in bold indicate pole position; races in italics indicate fastest lap)

Year	Team	Car	Class	1	2	3	4	5	6	7	8	9	10	Pos.	Points
2019	Dinamic Motorsport	Porsche 911 GT3 R	Pro	BRH; 1	BRH; 2	MIS; 1	MIS; 2	ZAN; 1	ZAN; 2	NÜR; 1	NÜR; 2	HUN; 1; 28	HUN; 2; 27	NC	0
2021	Sky – Tempesta Racing	Ferrari 488 GT3 Evo 2020	Silver	MAG; 1; 20	MAG; 2; 14	ZAN; 1; 19	ZAN; 2; 23	MIS; 1; 19	MIS; 2; 22	BRH; 1; 26	BRH; 2; 22	VAL; 1	VAL; 2	15th	13
2022	Dinamic Motorsport	Porsche 911 GT3 R	Pro	BRH; 1; 22	BRH; 2; 21	MAG; 1; 20	MAG; 2; 18	ZAN; 1; 11	ZAN; 2; 19	MIS; 1; 16	MIS; 2; 13	VAL; 1 Ret	VAL; 2; 19	NC	0

=== Complete FIA World Endurance Championship results ===
(key) (Races in bold indicate pole position; races in italics indicate fastest lap)

Year	Entrant	Class	Chassis	Engine	1	2	3	4	5	6	7	8	Rank	Points
2018–19	Dempsey-Proton Racing	LMGTE Am	Porsche 911 RSR	Porsche 4.0L Flat-6	SPA; 6	**LMS**; Ret	SIL; 8	FUJ; DSQ	SHA	**SEB**; 7	SPA; 9	**LMS**; Ret	19th	11
2024	Proton Competition	LMGT3	Ford Mustang GT3	Ford Coyote 5.4 L V8	QAT; 9	IMO; Ret	SPA; 8	LMS; 3	SÃO	COA	FUJ	BHR; Ret	17th	37

=== Complete 24 Hours of Le Mans results ===
Year	Team	Co-Drivers	Car	Class	Laps	Pos.	Class Pos.
2018	(Germany) Dempsey-Proton Racing	(United Arab Emirates) Khaled Al Qubaisi (Italy) Matteo Cairoli	Porsche 911 RSR	LMGTE Am	225	DNF	DNF
2019	(Germany) Dempsey-Proton Racing	(Italy) Matteo Cairoli (Japan) Satoshi Hoshino	Porsche 911 RSR	LMGTE Am	79	DNF	DNF
2024	(Germany) Proton Competition	(Norway) Dennis Olsen (Denmark) Mikkel O. Pedersen	Ford Mustang GT3	LMGT3	280	30th	**3rd**
2025	(Germany) Proton Competition	(Austria) René Binder (Netherlands) Bent Viscaal	Oreca 07-Gibson	LMP2	365	23rd	6th
2025	(Germany) Proton Competition	(Austria) René Binder (Netherlands) Bent Viscaal	Oreca 07-Gibson	LMP2 Pro-Am	365	23rd	**3rd**

=== Complete Asian Le Mans Series results ===
(key) (Races in bold indicate pole position) (Races in italics indicate fastest lap)

Year	Team	Class	Car	Engine	1	2	3	4	5	6	Pos.	Points
2021	Kessel Racing	GT Am	Ferrari 488 GT3	Ferrari F154CB 3.9 L Turbo V8	**DUB**; **1**; 3	**DUB**; **2**; 2	ABU; 1; 2	ABU; 2; 2			3rd	71
2022	Dinamic Motorsport	GT	Porsche 911 GT3 R	Porsche 4.0 L Flat-6	DUB; 1; 14	DUB; 2; 13	ABU; 1; 12	ABU; 2; 8			13th	5.5
2023–24	Proton Competition	LMP2	Oreca 07	Gibson GK428 4.2 L V8	SEP; 1; 5	SEP; 2; 3	DUB; 2	ABU; 1; 5	ABU; 2; 2		2nd	71
2024–25	Proton Competition	LMP2	Oreca 07	Gibson GK428 4.2 L V8	**SEP**; **1** DSQ	**SEP**; **2**; 4	**DUB**; **1**; 5	**DUB**; **2**; 4	**ABU**; **1**; 3	**ABU**; **2**; 6	5th	63
2025–26	United Autosports	LMP2	Oreca 07	Gibson GK428 4.2 L V8	**SEP**; **1**; 5	SEP; 2; 6	**DUB**; **1**; 6	**DUB**; **2** Ret	**ABU**; **1** Ret	**ABU**; **2**; 7	7th	37
