= 2013 Formula Abarth season =

2013 Formula Abarth

Seasons
- ← 2012 2014 →

The 2013 Formula Abarth season was the ninth and the final season of the former Formula Azzurra, and the fourth under its guise of "Formula Abarth". The series returned to a one-championship format, dropping the European Series moniker. The season started at Vallelunga on 28 April and concluded at 20 October at Monza.

Alessio Rovera won the series driving for Cram Motorsport, taking six wins and thirteen podiums. Rovera won the series by 68 points ahead of runner-up Michele Beretta driving for Euronova Racing by Fortec. Third place was taken by Simone Iaquinta, who drove for GSK, a further five points behind Beretta.

== Teams and drivers ==
All teams were Italian-registered.

Team	No.	Driver	Rounds
Euronova Racing by Fortec	1	(Italy) Michele Beretta	All
Euronova Racing by Fortec	72	(Russia) Vitaly Larionov	All
Euronova Racing by Fortec	77	(Russia) Sergey Trofimov	All
Cram Motorsport	6	(Italy) Giorgio Roda	3–5
Cram Motorsport	7	(Russia) Denis Nagulin	6
Cram Motorsport	12	(Italy) Alessio Rovera	All
Cram Motorsport	16	(Italy) Giada de Zen	2–3
Facondini Racing	11	(Brazil) Lukas de Moraes	All
GSK	14	(Finland) Aku Pellinen	1
GSK	14	(Italy) Kevin Gilardoni	3
GSK	38	(Italy) Simone Iaquinta	All
GSK	39	(Russia) Dzhon Simonyan	2
TomCat	21	(Mexico) Marco Tolama Portillo	1–2
TomCat	83	(Italy) Gianmarco Maggiulli	6
Best Lap	22	(Italy) Loris Spinelli	1
Best Lap	33	(Italy) Federico Pezzolla	1–2
Best Lap	84	(Italy) Giorgio Alberto Mandozzi	6
Torino Motorsport	23	(Mexico) Luis Michael Dörrbecker	1–3
Torino Motorsport	73	(Japan) Yuta Shiraishi	1, 3
Torino Motorsport	74	(Italy) Gabriele Rugin	2
NBC Group	58	(Italy) Dario Orsini	3–6
Technorace	78	(Italy) Alessandro Perullo	1–3, 5–6
AB Motorsport	99	(Italy) Sabino de Castro	All

== Race calendar and results ==
- A provisional all-Italian six-round calendar was announced on 4 December 2012. On 5 February 2013, the calendar was altered, and was altered again on 13 March.

Round		Circuit	Date	Pole position	Fastest lap	Winning driver	Winning team	Trophy winner	Rookie winner
1	R1	ACI Vallelunga Circuit	28 April	(Italy) Alessio Rovera	(Italy) Alessio Rovera	(Italy) Alessio Rovera	Cram Motorsport	(Russia) Sergey Trofimov	(Italy) Alessio Rovera
1	R2	ACI Vallelunga Circuit	28 April		(Italy) Alessio Rovera	(Italy) Simone Iaquinta	GSK	(Russia) Vitaly Larionov	(Italy) Alessio Rovera
1	R3	ACI Vallelunga Circuit	28 April	(Italy) Alessio Rovera	(Italy) Alessio Rovera	(Italy) Alessio Rovera	Cram Motorsport	(Russia) Sergey Trofimov	(Italy) Alessio Rovera
2	R1	Adria International Raceway	26 May	(Italy) Alessio Rovera	(Italy) Alessio Rovera	(Italy) Simone Iaquinta	GSK	(Italy) Gabriele Rujin	(Italy) Alessio Rovera
2	R2	Adria International Raceway	26 May		(Brazil) Lukas Moraes	(Brazil) Lukas Moraes	Facondini Racing	(Italy) Gabriele Rujin	(Brazil) Lukas Moraes
2	R3	Adria International Raceway	26 May	(Italy) Alessio Rovera	(Italy) Federico Pezzolla	(Italy) Alessio Rovera	Cram Motorsport	(Russia) Vitaly Larionov	(Italy) Alessio Rovera
3	R1	Mugello Circuit	13 July	(Italy) Alessio Rovera	(Italy) Simone Iaquinta	(Italy) Alessio Rovera	Cram Motorsport	(Russia) Sergey Trofimov	(Italy) Alessio Rovera
3	R2	Mugello Circuit	14 July		(Italy) Dario Orsini	(Italy) Simone Iaquinta	GSK	(Russia) Sergey Trofimov	(Brazil) Lukas Moraes
3	R3	Mugello Circuit	14 July	(Italy) Alessio Rovera	(Italy) Michele Beretta	(Italy) Michele Beretta	Euronova Racing by Fortec	(Russia) Sergey Trofimov	(Italy) Alessio Rovera
4	R1	Autodromo Enzo e Dino Ferrari, Imola	31 August	(Italy) Alessio Rovera	(Italy) Alessio Rovera	(Italy) Alessio Rovera	Cram Motorsport	(Russia) Sergey Trofimov	(Italy) Alessio Rovera
4	R2	Autodromo Enzo e Dino Ferrari, Imola	1 September		(Italy) Alessio Rovera	(Italy) Dario Orsini	NBC Group	(Russia) Vitaly Larionov	(Italy) Alessio Rovera
4	R3	Autodromo Enzo e Dino Ferrari, Imola	1 September	(Italy) Alessio Rovera	(Italy) Dario Orsini	(Italy) Dario Orsini	NBC Group	(Russia) Sergey Trofimov	(Italy) Alessio Rovera
5	R1	Misano World Circuit Marco Simoncelli	22 September	(Italy) Alessio Rovera	(Italy) Simone Iaquinta	(Italy) Simone Iaquinta	GSK	(Russia) Sergey Trofimov	(Brazil) Lukas Moraes
5	R2	Misano World Circuit Marco Simoncelli	22 September		(Italy) Simone Iaquinta	(Italy) Giorgio Roda	Cram Motorsport	(Russia) Sergey Trofimov	(Italy) Alessio Rovera
5	R3	Misano World Circuit Marco Simoncelli	22 September	(Italy) Simone Iaquinta	(Italy) Dario Orsini	(Italy) Alessio Rovera	Cram Motorsport	(Russia) Vitaly Larionov	(Italy) Alessio Rovera
6	R1	Monza Circuit	19 October	(Italy) Michele Beretta	(Italy) Simone Iaquinta	(Italy) Dario Orsini	NBC Group	(Italy) Sabino de Castro	(Italy) Alessio Rovera
6	R2	Monza Circuit	20 October		(Italy) Simone Iaquinta	(Italy) Simone Iaquinta	GSK	(Russia) Vitaly Larionov	(Brazil) Lukas Moraes
6	R3	Monza Circuit	20 October	(Italy) Simone Iaquinta	(Italy) Simone Iaquinta	(Russia) Denis Nagulin	Cram Motorsport	(Russia) Vitaly Larionov	(Italy) Alessio Rovera

== Championship standings ==
- Points were awarded as follows:

	1	2	3	4	5	6	7	8	9	10	PP	FL
Feature races	20	15	12	10	8	5	4	3	2	1	**1**	1
Sprint	13	11	9	7	6	5	4	3	2	1		1

=== Drivers' standings ===
Pos	Driver	VLL			ADR			MUG			IMO			MIS			MNZ			Pts
1	(Italy) Alessio Rovera	**1**	2	**1**	**2**	4	**1**	**1**	Ret	**4**	**1**	2	**3**	**10**	5	1	3	Ret	2	236
2	(Italy) Michele Beretta	2	3	2	12	12	7	3	2	1	Ret	Ret	2	2	10	Ret	**2**	4	5	168
3	(Italy) Simone Iaquinta	4	1	4	1	3	Ret	6	1	6	7	4	7	1	8	Ret	12	1	**10**	163
4	(Brazil) Lukas Moraes	8	9	10	5	1	2	5	3	8	4	7	6	7	6	5	4	7	9	139
5	(Italy) Dario Orsini							Ret	6	2	2	1	1	3	3	2	1	2	DSQ	130
6	(Italy) Giorgio Roda							2	5	14	8	3	5	4	1	Ret				73
7	(Mexico) Luis Michael Dörrbecker	7	5	5	6	2	Ret	8	4	9										52
8	(Italy) Federico Pezzolla	6	8	6	3	6	5													49
9	(Russia) Denis Nagulin																11	6	1	35
10	(Mexico) Marco Tolama Portillo	10	12	9	10	11	6													24
11	(Italy) Kevin Gilardoni							4	Ret	3										22
12	(Finland) Aku Pellinen	5	4	8																21
13	(Italy) Loris Spinelli	9	10	3																18
14	(Italy) Giada de Zen				8	Ret	Ret	Ret	Ret	5										13
15	(Russia) Dzhon Simonyan				9	8	Ret													9
National Formula ACI-CSAI Abarth Trophy
1	(Russia) Sergey Trofimov	3	7	7	7	7	4	7	7	7	3	6	4	5	2	4	7	5	4	242
2	(Russia) Vitaly Larionov	Ret	6	13	11	13	3	10	9	11	5	5	Ret	8	7	3	10	3	3	196
3	(Italy) Sabino de Castro	Ret	11	12	13	9	8	9	8	10	6	Ret	NC	9	9	7	5	Ret	7	162
4	(Italy) Alessandro Perullo	11	Ret	11	DNS	10	Ret	11	Ret	12				6	4	6	6	Ret	11	110
5	(Japan) Yuta Shiraishi	12	13	14				12	10	13										50
6	(Italy) Gabriele Rugin				4	5	Ret													33
7	(Italy) Gianmarco Maggiulli																8	9	6	29
8	(Italy) Giorgio Alberto Mandozzi																9	8	8	25
Pos	Driver	VLL			ADR			MUG			IMO			MIS			MNZ			Pts

Colour	Result
Gold	Winner
Silver	Second place
Bronze	Third place
Green	Points classification
Blue	Non-points classification
Blue	Non-classified finish (NC)
Purple	Retired, not classified (Ret)
Red	Did not qualify (DNQ)
Red	Did not pre-qualify (DNPQ)
Black	Disqualified (DSQ)
White	Did not start (DNS)
White	Withdrew (WD)
White	Race cancelled (C)
Blank	Did not practice (DNP)
Blank	Did not arrive (DNA)
Blank	Excluded (EX)

**Bold** – Pole
Italics – Fastest Lap

=== Rookies' standings ===
Pos	Driver	VLL			ADR			MUG			IMO			MIS			MNZ			Pts
1	(Italy) Alessio Rovera	1	2	1	2	4	1	1	Ret	1	1	2	3	10	5	1	3	Ret	2	274
2	(Brazil) Lukas Moraes	8	9	10	5	1	2	5	3	8	4	7	6	7	6	5	4	7	9	220
3	(Italy) Federico Pezzolla	6	8	6	3	6	5													69
4	(Mexico) Marco Tolama Portillo	10	12	9	11	10	6													42
5	(Finland) Aku Pellinen	5	4	8																36
6	(Italy) Loris Spinelli	9	10	3																29
7	(Russia) Dzhon Simonyan				9	8	Ret													17
Pos	Driver	VLL			ADR			MUG			IMO			MIS			MNZ			Pts

=== Teams' standings ===
Pos	Team	VLL			ADR			MUG			IMO			MIS			MNZ			Pts
1	Cram Motorsport	1	2	1	2	4	1	1	5	4	1	2	3	4	1	1	3	6	1	257
2	GSK	4	1	4	1	3	Ret	4	1	3	7	4	7	1	8	Ret	12	1	10	183
3	Euronova Racing by Fortec	2	3	2	12	12	7	3	2	1	Ret	Ret	2	2	10	Ret	2	4	5	166
4	Facondini Racing	10	12	9	5	1	2	5	3	8	4	7	6	7	6	5	4	7	9	148
5	Best Lap	6	8	3	3	6	5													55
6	Torino Motorsport	8	9	4	6	2	Ret	8	4	9										52
7	TomCat	10	12	9	10	11	6													24
Pos	Driver	VLL			ADR			MUG			IMO			MIS			MNZ			Pts
