= Alessio Rovera =

Italian racing driver

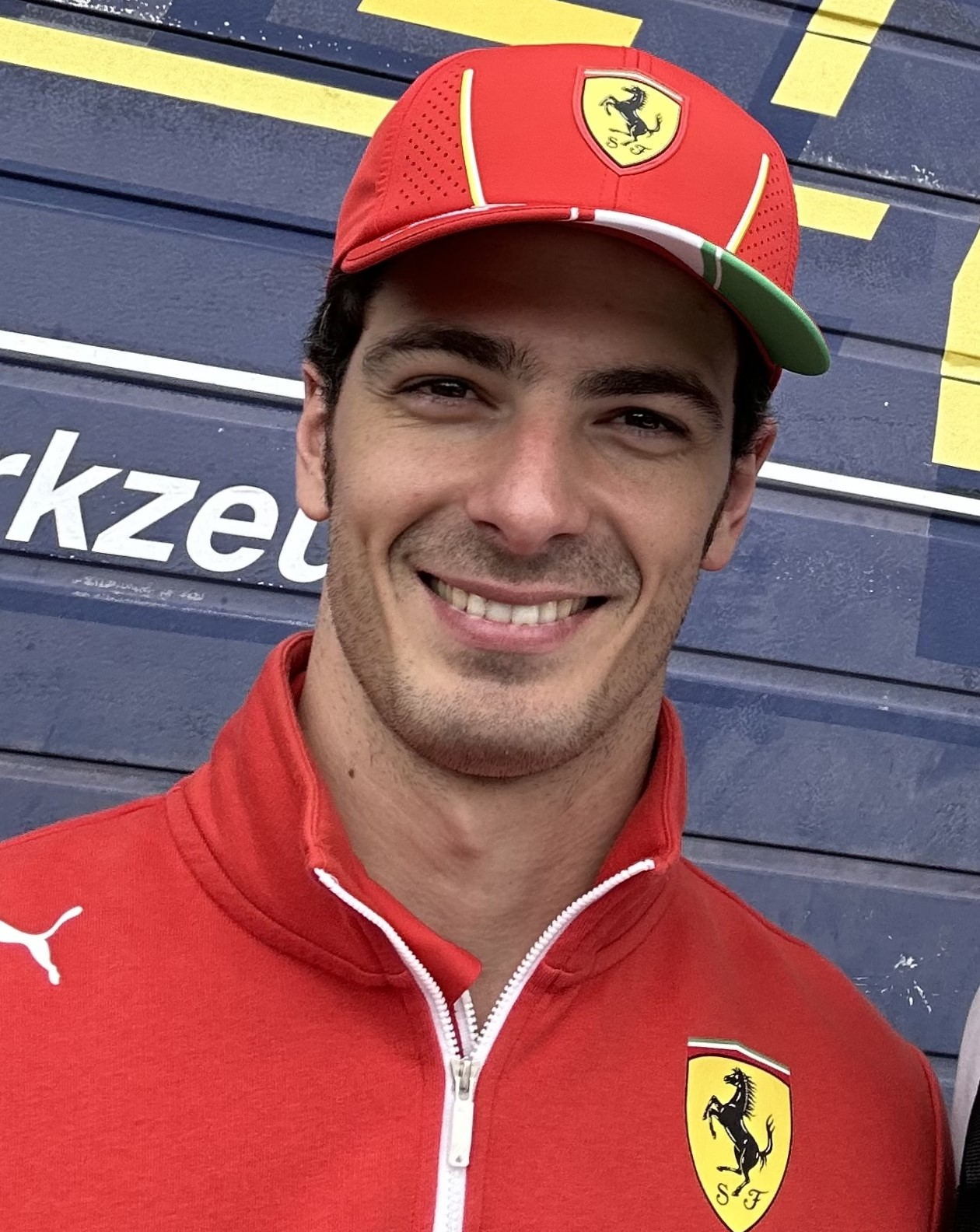
- Rovera in 2024
- Nationality: (Italy) Italian
- Born: 22 June 1995 (age 31) Varese, Lombardy, Italy

FIA World Endurance Championship career
- Current team: Vista AF Corse
- Categorisation: FIA Silver (until 2021); FIA Gold (2022); FIA Platinum (2023–)
- Car number: 21
- Starts: 4
- Wins: 3
- Poles: 0
- Fastest laps: 2

Alessio Rovera (born 22 June 1995) is an Italian racing driver. He is a Ferrari factory driver and currently competes in the FIA World Endurance Championship with AF Corse.

== Early career ==
After winning the 2013 Formula Abarth series in his debut season of single-seater racing, Rovera entered the Formula Renault 2.0 Alps championship in 2014. He finished the season sixth in the final standings, having scored three podiums. During the year, he also made a one-off appearance in the Euroformula Open Championship.

In 2015, Rovera moved into Euroformula Open, racing with DAV Racing for three rounds and doing the same with BVM Racing. He won the season opener at Jerez, having started that race from 13th place, and scored three further podiums on his way to sixth in the standings, which he achieved despite missing two events.

== Sportscar career ==
=== Porsche competitions ===
Rovera moved into sportscar racing ahead of 2016 with Ebimotors, whom he would drive for in the Porsche Carrera Cup Italia. His debut campaign demonstrated promise, as he won two races and took 12 podiums overall to finish third. In 2017, Rovera remained in the PCCI but switched to Tsunami RT. This time, he won four races, enough to clinch him the championship title by the end of the year. In addition, the Italian won a race of the Porsche Carrera Cup France and finished on the podium at the Porsche Carrera Cup support race of that year's 24 Hours of Le Mans.

Rovera followed this up by contesting a double campaign in the PCCI and PCCF during the 2018 season. He won six races in the former, earning him second place overall, and three in the latter on his way to third in the standings behind Ayhancan Güven and Julien Andlauer. That year, Rovera also made his debut in the Porsche Supercup, driving at the Red Bull Ring.

=== GT3 debut ===
Going into 2019, Rovera stepped up to the GT3 category, driving in the Endurance and Sprint iterations of the Italian GT Championship for Antonelli Motorsport. Together with Riccardo Agostini, Rovera won the Sprint series, having taken podiums in six out of eight races. For the 2020 season, Rovera switched to AF Corse, driving a Ferrari 488 GT3 in the IGT Endurance championship alongside Antonio Fuoco and Giorgio Roda. After winning at Imola, the trio clinched the Endurance title with another victory at the season finale in Monza. Rovera and Roda also contested the Sprint series, where they finished fourth with one race win. As well as this, the Italian made his first appearance in the European Le Mans Series and its LMGTE class, racing for AF Corse at the final round.

=== Endurance successes ===
==== 2021 ====
2021 saw Rovera remain with AF Corse, who fielded him as their designated silver-ranked driver in the LMGTE Am class of the FIA World Endurance Championship, where he partnered Nicklas Nielsen and gentleman driver François Perrodo. The trio experienced a dominant campaign, which started out with a win at Spa-Francorchamps, where Rovera impressed on debut during the middle stint. Another win came at Monza, where Rovera and his teammates rebounded from a demotion to the back of the grid after qualifying. However, the team's highlight performance came at the 24 Hours of Le Mans, as AF Corse won the race in LMGTE Am in what was Rovera's Le Mans debut. Another victory at the season finale in Bahrain earned Rovera, Nielsen, and Perrodo the LMGTE Am title, which they won with a gap of 59.5 points. During 2021, Rovera also drove in the ELMS, where he, Perrodo, and Emmanuel Collard won two races on their way to third in the standings.

As a result of his performances, Rovera was signed by Ferrari as an official factory GT driver.

==== 2022 ====
In 2022, Rovera, who had now been upgraded to gold status by the FIA, made his first foray into prototype racing with a drive in the LMP2 class of the WEC and ELMS. Competing once again for AF Corse, he, along with Nielsen and Rovera, would contest each series's Pro-Am class due to Perrodo's classification as an FIA bronze. In the WEC, the trio once again triumphed, winning four races in their subclass to take the LMP2 Pro-Am title. Meanwhile, the trio scored one subclass win in the ELMS thanks to a charging drive by Rovera at Barcelona, coming up short on the title to the Racing Team Turkey trio of Jack Aitken, Charlie Eastwood, and Salih Yoluç. Rovera also drove in selected GT races during the year, finishing second at both the GT World Challenge Europe Endurance Cup finale in Barcelona and the IGTC finale at Abu Dhabi, as well as scoring the fastest lap and thereby setting the GT3 record time during the 24 Hours of Spa.

==== 2023 ====
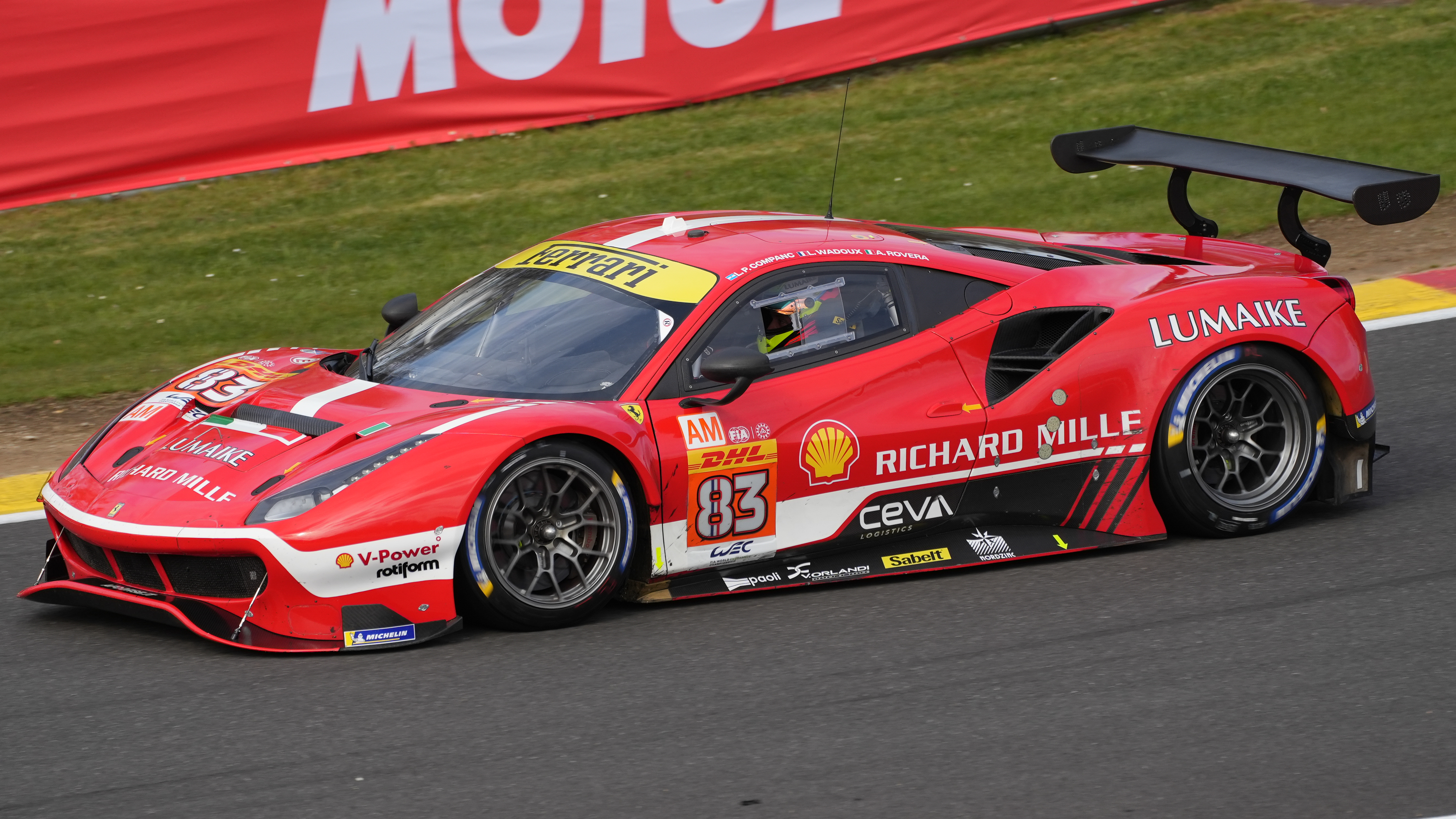
Rovera's Ferrari 488 GTE Evo at the 2023 6 Hours of Spa-Francorchamps.

As a newly minted platinum driver per the FIA's standard, Rovera focused on GT racing in 2023, driving alongside fellow factory driver Lilou Wadoux and bronze-ranked Luis Pérez Companc in the WEC's final LMGTE Am season, whilst partnering Nicklas Nielsen and Robert Shwartzman in the GTWC Europe Endurance Cup. Following a spectacular crash by Companc in the opening laps at Sebring, the team redeemed themselves by charging towards second at Portimão, where Rovera narrowly missed out on victory to Nicky Catsburg. The trio dominated the next round at Spa-Francorchamps, winning the race and making Wadoux the first ever female winner in the championship. However, a crash by Wadoux in torrential rain at Le Mans and a turn one beaching of the car by Companc at Fuji proved detrimental to the team's season, which they finished eighth in the standings. In the GTWC Endurance Cup, Rovera and his teammates scored a pole position and a victory at the season-ending Barcelona round, leading them to eighth place overall, highest of all entries competing with the new Ferrari 296 GT3.

During the middle of the year, Rovera replaced Ben Barnicoat at AF Corse's LMP2 squad in the ELMS for two races, subsequently helping Matthieu Vaxivière and François Perrodo to win at Aragón in the Pro-Am class.

==== 2024 ====
At the end of 2023 and going into 2024, Rovera paired up with Vaxivière and Perrodo once again in LMP2, driving in the Asian Le Mans Series. The trio scored a second place at the opening race in Sepang and took another runner-up spot at Abu Dhabi, where Rovera had taken a controlling lead before it was wiped away thanks to a red flag. An early collision which involved Perrodo at the final race meant that the squad had to settle for fifth in the teams' rankings.

Rovera continued racing alongside the two Frenchmen in the LMP2 Pro-Am class of the ELMS, whilst also returning to the WEC to compete in the new LMGT3 class alongside Simon Mann and François Hériau. He also partnered Alessandro Pier Guidi and Davide Rigon in the GT World Challenge Europe Endurance Cup.

Thanks to a strong pit strategy, Rovera and his ELMS teammates won the opening round at Barcelona. After high tyre wear for Vaxivière dropped the team to fourth in class at Le Castellet, the team finished second in Imola. A dominant race in Belgium followed, with AF Corse winning and title rivals TDS Racing retiring. The team's championship advantage was undone by contact at Mugello, where Rovera collided with the #63 Iron Lynx Lamborghini and got stuck in the gravel, later going on to finish seventh. Despite a strong strategy gamble by Algarve Pro Racing's Alex Quinn in Portimão, Rovera and AF Corse clinched the Pro-Am title by finishing fourth. In the WEC meanwhile, Rovera and his teammates finished in the points in all but one race and ended up third in the points standings. Rovera capped off the season with an impressive performance at Bahrain, coming out on top in a late-race battle with Charlie Eastwood for the victory. Having been among the drivers with the fastest average lap times during his WEC stints, Rovera received the Goodyear Wingfoot Award for LMGT3 drivers at season's end.

Another notable success story unfolded in the GTWC Europe Endurance Cup: after finishing ninth in France, Rovera and his teammates narrowly missed out on victory at the 24 Hours of Spa, dropping to second after being held up by a slow car in pit lane. They took eighth at the Nürburgring but vaulted up the standings with third place in Monza, having led most of the race from pole. Pole at Jeddah gave Rovera the chance to win the title, and although his stint in the lead was ended by a slow pit stop, third place at the flag following a late charge by Pier Guidi was enough to clinch the title for him and AF Corse.

==== 2025 ====
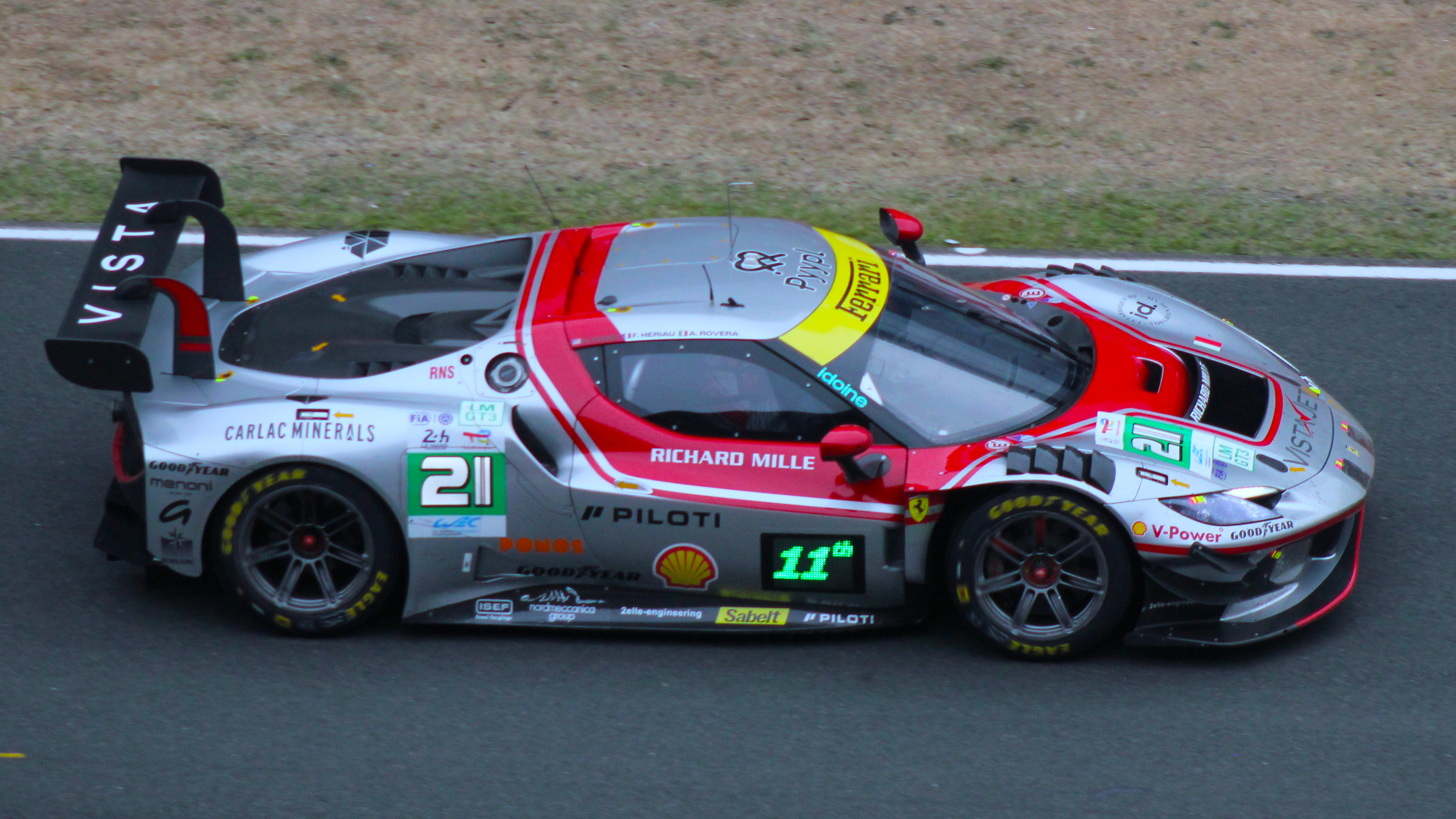
Rovera's No. 21 car at the 2025 24 Hours of Le Mans

Rovera once again raced in the Asian Le Mans Series over the winter of 2024 and 2025. The AF Corse squad finished second at Sepang, with Vaxivière losing victory on the final straight to Tristan Vautier. Sixth in the second Sepang race and fourth in race 1 at Dubai followed, meanwhile another late pass by Vautier on Vaxivière left AF Corse third in Dubai race 2. In the first Abu Dhabi race, the lineup finished sixth after losing time with a tyre strategy gamble and a later collision caused by Tom Dillmann. On Sunday, Rovera built up a 20-second gap to the cars behind following a safety car period and handed the car over to Vaxivière, who closed off the race and secured victory. This result earned Rovera, Vaxivière, and Perrodo third in the championship.

The 2025 schedule for Rovera turned out to be intensive: he returned to the WEC to partner Mann and Hériau, joined Vaxivière and Perrodo in their ELMS Pro-Am title defence, and contested a double programme of GTWC Europe Sprint Cup and Endurance Cup, all with AF Corse. The WEC campaign started with fifth place in Qatar and a retirement in Imola, where Rovera's teammate Mann was spun out of a podium position by Valentino Rossi. The team bounced back well at Spa, as a tyre-saving run by Hériau enabled Rovera to drive home with a 40-second lead to second place in the final stint. Rovera qualified second at Le Mans; he and the team then remained in the front positions throughout the event and finished second. São Paulo meanwhile yielded a lowly 13th place, and the mistake of remaining on wet-weather tyres in drying conditions at Cota caused Rovera to drop back to 12th. Fuji proved to be different: Rovera took over in the lead of LMGT3 going into his stints, and still led going into the closing laps. A potential victory was undone there however, as Rovera was forced to complete his final lap very slowly due to an energy miscalculation, causing him to be demoted to second after the finish due to an earlier five-second penalty for a pit stop infringement.

== Racing record ==
=== Career summary ===
Season	Series	Team	Races	Wins	Poles	F/Laps	Podiums	Points	Position
2013	Formula Abarth	Cram Motorsport	18	6	9	7	12	236	**1st**
2014	Formula Renault 2.0 Alps	Cram Motorsport	12	0	0	0	3	65	6th
2014	Euroformula Open Championship	Corbetta Competizioni	2	0	0	0	0	0	NC†
2015	Euroformula Open Championship	DAV Racing	6	1	0	0	1	100	6th
2015	Euroformula Open Championship	BVM Racing	6	0	0	0	3	100	6th
2015	Spanish Formula 3 Championship	DAV Racing	2	1	0	0	1	34	8th
2015	Spanish Formula 3 Championship	BVM Racing	2	0	0	0	0	34	8th
2016	Porsche Carrera Cup Italia	Ebimotors	21	2	1	0	12	203	**3rd**
2017	Porsche Carrera Cup Italia	Tsunami RT	14	4	3	6	9	182	**1st**
2017	Porsche Carrera Cup France	Tsunami RT	5	1	0	0	1	66	10th
2017	Porsche Carrera Cup Le Mans - Class A	Tsunami RT	1	0	0	0	1	N/A	**3rd**
2018	Porsche Carrera Cup Italia	Tsunami RT - Centro Porsche Padova	9	6	4	5	6	119	**2nd**
2018	Porsche Carrera Cup France	Tsunami RT	12	3	1	2	8	188	**3rd**
2018	Porsche GT3 Cup Challenge Benelux	Tsunami RT	2	1	0	1	2	0	NC†
2018	24H GT Series - SPX	Tsunami RT	1	1	0	0	1	0	NC†
2018	Porsche Supercup	Dinamic Motorsport	1	0	0	0	0	0	35th
2019	Italian GT Sprint Championship - GT3 Pro	Antonelli Motorsport	8	3	2	0	6	97	**1st**
2019	Italian GT Endurance Championship - GT3 Pro-Am	Antonelli Motorsport	4	0	2	0	1	0	NC†
2019	International GT Open - GT3 Pro	Antonelli Motorsport	6	0	1	0	1	17	18th
2020	Italian GT Endurance Championship	AF Corse	4	2	1	0	2	47	**1st**
2020	Italian GT Sprint Championship	AF Corse	8	1	1	0	2	62	4th
2020	European Le Mans Series - GTE	AF Corse	1	0	0	0	0	0	NC†
2021	FIA World Endurance Championship - GTE Am	AF Corse	6	4	0	2	4	150	**1st**
2021	24 Hours of Le Mans - GTE Am	AF Corse	1	1	0	0	1	—N/a	**1st**
2021	European Le Mans Series - GTE	AF Corse	5	2	1	0	4	83	**3rd**
2021	Intercontinental GT Challenge	AF Corse	3	0	0	0	0	0	NC
2021	GT World Challenge Europe Endurance Cup - Pro-Am Cup	AF Corse	1	0	0	1	1	32	16th
2021	GT World Challenge Europe Endurance Cup - Pro Cup	Iron Lynx	2	0	0	0	0	0	NC
2021	Asian Le Mans Series - GT	Formula Racing	4	0	0	0	1	23.5	9th
2022	FIA World Endurance Championship - LMP2	AF Corse	6	0	2	0	0	12	18th
2022	European Le Mans Series - LMP2	AF Corse	6	0	1	0	0	25	12th
2022	24 Hours of Le Mans - LMP2	AF Corse	1	0	0	0	0	—N/a	19th
2022	GT World Challenge Europe Endurance Cup	AF Corse	1	0	0	1	0	19	19th
2022	GT World Challenge Europe Endurance Cup	Iron Lynx	2	0	1	0	1	19	19th
2022	IMSA SportsCar Championship - GTD	Cetilar Racing	1	0	0	0	0	189	64th
2022	Intercontinental GT Challenge	AF Corse - Francorchamps	1	0	0	0	1	18	13th
2023	FIA World Endurance Championship - GTE Am	Richard Mille AF Corse	7	1	0	2	2	56	8th
2023	24 Hours of Le Mans - LMGTE Am	Richard Mille AF Corse	1	0	0	0	0	—N/a	DNF
2023	GT World Challenge Europe Endurance Cup	AF Corse	5	1	1	0	1	36	8th
2023	European Le Mans Series - LMP2 Pro-Am	AF Corse	2	1	0	0	1	37	10th
2023	IMSA SportsCar Championship - GTD	Triarsi Competizione	4	0	0	0	0	863	34th
2023–24	Asian Le Mans Series - LMP2	AF Corse	5	0	0	0	2	52	6th
2024	FIA World Endurance Championship - LMGT3	Vista AF Corse	8	1	0	1	1	97	**3rd**
2024	24 Hours of Le Mans - LMGT3	Vista AF Corse	1	0	0	0	0	—N/a	6th
2024	European Le Mans Series - LMP2 Pro-Am	AF Corse	3	2	0	2	3	98	**1st**
2024	GT World Challenge Europe Endurance Cup	AF Corse - Francorchamps Motors	5	0	2	0	3	71	**1st**
2024	IMSA SportsCar Championship - GTD	Triarsi Competizione	5	0	0	2	0	1225	28th
2024–25	Asian Le Mans Series - LMP2	AF Corse	6	1	0	0	3	86	**3rd**
2025	FIA World Endurance Championship - LMGT3	Vista AF Corse	7	1	0	1	3	94	**2nd***
2025	24 Hours of Le Mans - LMGT3	Vista AF Corse	1	0	0	0	1	—N/a	**2nd**
2025	IMSA SportsCar Championship - GTD	Triarsi Competizione	2	0	0	0	0	298	64th
2025	European Le Mans Series - LMP2	AF Corse	4	1	0	1	2	62	5th*
2025	GT World Challenge Europe Endurance Cup	AF Corse - Francorchamps Motors	5	0	0	0	1	22	13th
2025	GT World Challenge Europe Sprint Cup	AF Corse - Francorchamps Motors	10	1	1	0	2	44.5	6th
2025	FIA World Endurance Championship - Hypercar	Ferrari AF Corse	Reserve driver						
2025–26	Asian Le Mans Series - GT	AF Corse	6	0	0	1	1	43	9th
2026	FIA World Endurance Championship - LMGT3	Vista AF Corse							
2026	GT World Challenge Europe Endurance Cup	AF Corse	4	0	1	1	1	16	14th
2026	IMSA SportsCar Championship - GTD Pro	Triarsi Competizione	1	0	0	0	0	258	38th
2026	FIA World Endurance Championship - Hypercar	Ferrari AF Corse	Reserve driver						
2026	FIA GT World Cup	33R HAR Racing							
2026–27	Asian Le Mans Series - GT3	AF Corse							

^{†} As Rovera was a guest driver, he was ineligible to score points.
* Season still in progress.

=== Complete Formula Abarth Championship results ===
(key) (Races in bold indicate pole position) (Races in italics indicate fastest lap)

Year	Team	1	2	3	4	5	6	7	8	9	10	11	12	13	14	15	16	17	18	DC	Points
2013	Cram Motorsport	**VAL**; **1**; 1	VAL; 2; 2	**VAL**; **3**; 1	**ADR**; **1**; 2	ADR; 2; 4	**ADR**; **3**; 1	**MUG**; **1**; 1	MUG; 2 Ret	**MUG**; **3**; 4	**IMO**; **1**; 1	IMO; 2; 2	**IMO**; **3**; 3	**MIS**; **1**; 10	MIS; 2; 5	MIS; 3; 1	MNZ; 1; 3	MNZ; 2 Ret	MNZ; 3; 2	1st	236

=== Complete Formula Renault 2.0 Alps Series results ===
(key) (Races in bold indicate pole position) (Races in italics indicate fastest lap)

Year	Entrant	1	2	3	4	5	6	7	8	9	10	11	12	13	14	Pos	Points
2014	Cram Motorsport	IMO; 1 Ret	IMO; 2; 20	PAU; 1; 17	PAU; 2 Ret	RBR; 1; 6	RBR; 2; 2	SPA; 1; 14	SPA; 2; 8	MNZ; 1; 2	MNZ; 2; 3	MUG; 1; 20	MUG; 2; 23	JER; 1	JER; 2	6th	65

=== Porsche Carrera Cup Italia results ===
(key) (Races in bold indicate pole position) (Races in italics indicate fastest lap)

Year	Team	1	2	3	4	5	6	7	8	9	10	11	12	13	14	15	16	17	18	19	20	21	DC	Points
2016	Ebimotors	MNZ; 1; 4	MNZ; 2; 5	MNZ; 3; 3	IMO1; 1; 3	IMO1; 2; 3	**IMO1**; **3**; 2	MIS; 1; 2	MIS; 2; 3	MIS; 3; 7	MUG1; 1; 6	MUG1; 2; 3	MUG1; 3; 1	VLL; 1; 10	VLL; 2; 3	VLL; 3; 4	IMO2; 1; 6	IMO2; 2; 3	IMO2; 3; 1	MUG2; 1; 4	MUG2; 2; 4	MUG2; 3; 3	3rd	203
2017	Tsunami RT	IMO1; 1; 2	IMO1; 2; 12	**MIS**; **1**; 2	MIS; 2; 1	**VLL**; **1**; 1	VLL; 2 Ret	MUG1; 1; 4	MUG1; 2; 2	IMO2; 1; 1	IMO2; 2; 4	MUG2; 1; 2	MUG2; 2; 7	**MNZ**; **1**; 1	MNZ; 2; 2								1st	182
2018	Tsunami RT - Centro Porsche Padova	IMO1; 1; 4	IMO1; 2; 1	**LEC**; **1**; 1	LEC; 2; 1	**MNZ**; **1**; 19	MNZ; 2 DNS	**MIS**; **1**; 1	MIS; 2; 1	MUG; 1	MUG; 2	VLL; 1	VLL; 2	**IMO2**; **1**; 1	IMO2; 2; 7								2nd	119

=== Complete Italian GT Sprint Championship results ===
(key) (Races in bold indicate pole position; races in italics indicate fastest lap)

Year	Entrant	Class	Car	1	2	3	4	5	6	7	8	Pos.	Points
2019	Antonelli Motorsport	Pro	Mercedes AMG GT3	VAL; 1; 2	VAL; 2; 1	IMO; 1 Ret	IMO; 2 Ret	MUG; 1; 2	**MUG**; **2**; 1	**MNZ**; **1**; 3	MNZ; 2; 1	1st	97
2020	AF Corse	Pro	Ferrari 488 GT3	MIS; 1; 4	**MIS**; **2**; 2	MUG; 1; 8	MUG; 2; 4	MNZ; 1; 5	MNZ; 2; 1	VAL; 1; 14	VAL; 2; 4	4th	62

=== Complete European Le Mans Series results ===
(key) (Races in bold indicate pole position; races in italics indicate fastest lap)

Year	Entrant	Class	Car	Engine	1	2	3	4	5	6	Pos.	Points
2020	AF Corse	LMGTE	Ferrari 488 GTE Evo	Ferrari F154CB 3.9 L Turbo V8	LEC	SPA	LEC	MNZ	ALG; 8		NC	0
2021	AF Corse	LMGTE	Ferrari 488 GTE Evo	Ferrari F154CB 3.9 L Turbo V8	CAT; WD	**RBR**; 1	LEC; 3	MNZ; 3	SPA; 1	ALG; 10	3rd	83
2022	AF Corse	LMP2	Oreca 07	Gibson GK428 4.2 L V8	LEC; 8	**IMO**; 14	MNZ; 12	CAT; 5	SPA; 7	ALG; 8	12th	25
2022	AF Corse	Pro-Am Cup	Oreca 07	Gibson GK428 4.2 L V8	2	5	4	1	2	2	3rd	101
2023	AF Corse	LMP2 Pro-Am	Oreca 07	Gibson GK428 4.2 L V8	CAT	LEC	ARA; 1	SPA; 4	ALG	ALG	10th	37
2024	AF Corse	LMP2 Pro-Am	Oreca 07	Gibson GK428 4.2 L V8	CAT; 1	LEC; 4	IMO; 2	SPA; 1	MUG; 7	ALG; 4	1st	98
2025	AF Corse	LMP2 Pro-Am	Oreca 07	Gibson GK428 4.2 L V8	CAT; 1	LEC	IMO; 5	SPA; 4	SIL; 3	ALG; 6	5th	70

=== Complete Asian Le Mans Series results ===
(key) (Races in bold indicate pole position) (Races in italics indicate fastest lap)

Year	Team	Class	Car	Engine	1	2	3	4	5	6	Pos.	Points
2021	Formula Racing	GT	Ferrari 488 GT3	Ferrari F154CB 3.9 L Turbo V8	DUB; 1; 6	DUB; 2; 16	ABU; 1; 3	ABU; 2 Ret			9th	23.5
2023–24	AF Corse	LMP2	Oreca 07	Gibson GK428 4.2 L V8	SEP; 1; 2	SEP; 2; 4	DUB; 8	ABU; 1; 2	ABU; 2; 12		6th	52
2024–25	AF Corse	LMP2	Oreca 07	Gibson GK428 4.2 L V8	SEP; 1; 2	SEP; 2; 6	DUB; 1; 4	DUB; 2; 3	ABU; 1; 6	ABU; 2; 1	3rd	86
2025–26	AF Corse	GT	Ferrari 296 GT3	Ferrari F154 3.0 L Turbo V6	SEP; 1 Ret	SEP; 2; 7	DUB; 1; 3	DUB; 2; 17	ABU; 1; 6	ABU; 2; 4	9th	43

=== Complete FIA World Endurance Championship results ===
(key) (Races in bold indicate pole position; results in italics indicate fastest lap)

Year	Entrant	Class	Car	Engine	1	2	3	4	5	6	7	8	Rank	Points
2021	AF Corse	LMGTE Am	Ferrari 488 GTE Evo	Ferrari F154CB 3.9 L Turbo V8	SPA; 1	POR; 11	MON; 1	LMS; 1	BHR; 5	BHR; 1			1st	150
2022	AF Corse	LMP2	Oreca 07	Gibson GK428 4.2 L V8	**SEB**; 9	**SPA**; 9	LMS; 11	MNZ; 9	FUJ; 10	BHR; 10			18th	12
2022	AF Corse	Pro-Am Cup	Oreca 07	Gibson GK428 4.2 L V8	1	1	2	3	1	1			1st	177
2023	Richard Mille AF Corse	LMGTE Am	Ferrari 488 GTE Evo	Ferrari F154CB 3.9 L Turbo V8	SEB; Ret	PRT; 2	SPA; 1	LMS; Ret	MNZ; 6	FUJ; 9	BHR; 9		8th	56
2024	Vista AF Corse	LMGT3	Ferrari 296 GT3	Ferrari F163 3.0 L Turbo V6	QAT; 7	IMO; 4	SPA; 13	LMS; 5	SÃO; 6	COA; 10	**FUJ**; 6	BHR; 1	3rd	97
2025	Vista AF Corse	LMGT3	Ferrari 296 GT3	Ferrari F163 3.0 L Turbo V6	QAT; 5	IMO; Ret	SPA; 1	LMS; 2	SÃO; 13	COA; 12	FUJ; 2	BHR; 5	2nd	109
2026	Vista AF Corse	LMGT3	Ferrari 296 GT3 Evo	Ferrari F163CE 3.0 L Turbo V6	IMO; 6	SPA; 4	LMS; 5	SÃO; 9	COA	FUJ	CAT	MNZ	7th*	42*

^{*} Season still in progress.

=== Complete 24 Hours of Le Mans results ===
Year	Team	Co-Drivers	Car	Class	Laps	Pos.	Class Pos.
2021	(Italy) AF Corse	(Denmark) Nicklas Nielsen (France) François Perrodo	Ferrari 488 GTE Evo	GTE; Am	340	25th	**1st**
2022	(Italy) AF Corse	(Denmark) Nicklas Nielsen (France) François Perrodo	Oreca 07-Gibson	LMP2	361	24th	19th
2023	(Italy) Richard Mille AF Corse	(Argentina) Luis Pérez Companc (France) Lilou Wadoux	Ferrari 488 GTE Evo	GTE; Am	33	DNF	DNF
2024	(Italy) Vista AF Corse	(France) François Hériau (United States) Simon Mann	Ferrari 296 GT3	LMGT3	279	33rd	6th
2025	(Italy) Vista AF Corse	(France) François Hériau (United States) Simon Mann	Ferrari 296 GT3	LMGT3	341	34th	**2nd**
2026	(Italy) Vista AF Corse	(France) François Hériau (United States) Simon Mann	Ferrari 296 GT3 Evo	LMGT3	335	37th	5th

=== Complete GT World Challenge results ===
==== GT World Challenge Europe Endurance Cup ====
(key) (Races in bold indicate pole position; results in italics indicate fastest lap)

Year	Team	Car	Class	1	2	3	4	5	6	7	Pos.	Points
2021	AF Corse	Ferrari 488 GT3 Evo 2020	Pro-Am	MNZ	LEC	SPA; 6H; 25	SPA; 12H; 20	SPA; 24H; 17			16th	32
2021	Iron Lynx	Ferrari 488 GT3 Evo 2020	Pro						NÜR; 38	CAT; 39	NC	0
2022	AF Corse	Ferrari 488 GT3 Evo 2020	Pro-Am	IMO	LEC	SPA; 6H; 35	SPA; 12H; 29	**SPA**; **24H**; 20			7th	40
2022	Iron Lynx	Ferrari 488 GT3 Evo 2020	Pro						HOC; Ret	**CAT**; 2	19th	19
2023	AF Corse - Francorchamps Motors	Ferrari 296 GT3	Pro	MNZ; 8	LEC; 7	SPA; 6H; 29	SPA; 12H; 25	SPA; 24H; 44†	NÜR; 22	**CAT**; 1	8th	36
2024	AF Corse - Francorchamps Motors	Ferrari 296 GT3	Pro	LEC; 9	SPA; 6H; 5	SPA; 12H; 4	SPA; 24H; 2	NÜR; 8	**MNZ**; 3	**JED**; 3	1st	71
2025	AF Corse - Francorchamps Motors	Ferrari 296 GT3	Pro	LEC; 15	MNZ; 49†	SPA; 6H; 12	SPA; 12H; 3	SPA; 24H; 3	NÜR; 46†	CAT; 33	13th	22
2026	AF Corse	Ferrari 296 GT3 Evo	Pro	LEC; 14	MNZ; Ret	SPA; 6H; 35	SPA; 12H; 23	**SPA**; **24H**; 3	NÜR; 29	ALG	14th	16

^{*} Season still in progress.

==== GT World Challenge Europe Sprint Cup ====
(key) (Races in bold indicate pole position; results in italics indicate fastest lap)

Year	Team	Car	Class	1	2	3	4	5	6	7	8	9	10	Pos.	Points
2025	AF Corse - Francorchamps Motors	Ferrari 296 GT3	Pro	BRH; 1; 1	BRH; 2; 19	ZAN; 1 Ret	ZAN; 2; 14	MIS; 1; 2	MIS; 2; 4	MAG; 1 Ret	MAG; 2; 4	VAL; 1; 20	VAL; 2; 16	6th	44.5

=== Complete IMSA SportsCar Championship results ===
(key) (Races in bold indicate pole position; results in italics indicate fastest lap)

Year	Team	Class	Make	Engine	1	2	3	4	5	6	7	8	9	10	11	12	Pos.	Points
2022	Cetilar Racing	GTD	Ferrari 488 GT3 Evo 2020	Ferrari F154CB 3.9 L Turbo V8	DAY; 14	SEB	LBH	LGA	MDO	DET	WGL	MOS	LIM	ELK	VIR	PET	64th	163
2023	Triarsi Competizione	GTD	Ferrari 296 GT3	Ferrari F163CE 3.0 L Turbo V6	DAY; 10	SEB; 20	LBH	MON	WGL; 4	MOS	LIM	ELK	VIR	IMS	PET; 10		34th	863
2024	Triarsi Competizione	GTD	Ferrari 296 GT3	Ferrari F163CE 3.0 L Turbo V6	DAY; 4	SEB; 14	LBH	LGA	WGL; 9	MOS	ELK; 12	VIR	IMS	PET; 4			28th	1225
2025	Triarsi Competizione	GTD	Ferrari 296 GT3	Ferrari F163CE 3.0 L Turbo V6	DAY; 15	SEB; 20	LBH	LGA	WGL	MOS	ELK	VIR	IMS	PET			64th	298
2026	Triarsi Competizione	GTD Pro	Ferrari 296 GT3 Evo	Ferrari F163CE 3.0 L Turbo V6	DAY; 8	SEB	LGA	DET	WGL	MOS	ELK	VIR	IMS	PET			38th	258
