= 2012 Formula Abarth season =

2012 Formula Abarth

Seasons
- ← 2011 2013 →

The 2012 Formula Abarth season was the eighth season of the former Formula Azzurra, and the third under its guise of "Formula Abarth". The European Championship began on 31 March in Valencia, while the Italian Championship commenced on 10 June at Mugello. They finished together on 30 September at Monza.

Nicolas Costa, who drove for Euronova Racing by Fortec, won both series, taking four victories in the Italian series and six victories in the European championship. Costa won the Italian series by nineteen points and the European series by twenty points over runner-up Luca Ghiotto of the Prema Powerteam, with third place in the European championship taken by Ghiotto's teammate Bruno Bonifacio, while Costa's teammate Emanuele Zonzini finished third in the Italian championship.

== Teams and drivers ==
Team	No.	Driver	Rounds
(Italy) Prema Powerteam	2	(Brazil) Bruno Bonifacio	All
(Italy) Prema Powerteam	3	(Italy) Luca Ghiotto	All
(Italy) Prema Powerteam	21	(Italy) Giorgio Roda	All
(Italy) DIEGI Motorsport	5	(Venezuela) Francisco Javier Amado	1–3, 5–8
(Italy) BVM	9	(Uruguay) Santiago Urrutia	All
(Italy) BVM	23	(Indonesia) Sean Gelael	8
(Italy) BVM	24	(Italy) Antonio Giovinazzi	8
(Switzerland) Jenzer Motorsport	17	(Venezuela) Samin Gómez Briceno	All
(Switzerland) Jenzer Motorsport	18	(Switzerland) Kevin Jörg	All
(Switzerland) Jenzer Motorsport	19	(United Kingdom) Gregor Ramsay	All
(Italy) JD Motorsport	26	(Venezuela) Juan Branger	All
(Italy) Euronova Racing by Fortec	35	(San Marino) Emanuele Zonzini	All
(Italy) Euronova Racing by Fortec	39	(Brazil) Nicolas Costa	All
(Italy) Cram Competition	51	(Italy) Michele Beretta	3–8
(Italy) Cram Competition	52	(Brazil) Antonio Furlan	3–8

== Race calendar and results ==
- An eight-round calendar was announced on 6 December 2011. The series will adopt a format used in a majority of the Formula Three series, with three races a weekend, two of which held on the Saturday and the final race on the Sunday. The series will support the Italian Formula Three Championship at all rounds, with the races at Valencia and Budapest also supporting the World Touring Car Championship.

Round		Circuit	Date	Pole position	Fastest lap	Winning driver	Winning team	Rookie winner
1	Feature	(Spain) Valencia Circuit	31 March	(Italy) Luca Ghiotto	(Italy) Luca Ghiotto	(Italy) Luca Ghiotto	(Italy) Prema Powerteam	(Switzerland) Kevin Jörg
1	Feature	(Spain) Valencia Circuit	31 March	(Switzerland) Kevin Jörg	(Italy) Luca Ghiotto	(Italy) Luca Ghiotto	(Italy) Prema Powerteam	(Switzerland) Kevin Jörg
1	Sprint	(Spain) Valencia Circuit	1 April		(Brazil) Nicolas Costa	(Brazil) Nicolas Costa	(Italy) Euronova Racing by Fortec	(Switzerland) Kevin Jörg
2	Feature	(Hungary) Hungaroring	5 May	(Brazil) Nicolas Costa	(Brazil) Nicolas Costa	(Brazil) Nicolas Costa	(Italy) Euronova Racing by Fortec	(Uruguay) Santiago Urrutia
2	Feature	(Hungary) Hungaroring	5 May	(Brazil) Bruno Bonifacio	(Brazil) Nicolas Costa	(Brazil) Bruno Bonifacio	(Italy) Prema Powerteam	(Uruguay) Santiago Urrutia
2	Sprint	(Hungary) Hungaroring	6 May		(Brazil) Bruno Bonifacio	(Brazil) Bruno Bonifacio	(Italy) Prema Powerteam	(Uruguay) Santiago Urrutia
3	Feature	(Italy) Mugello Circuit	9 June	(Italy) Luca Ghiotto	(Italy) Luca Ghiotto	(Italy) Luca Ghiotto	(Italy) Prema Powerteam	(Uruguay) Santiago Urrutia
3	Feature	(Italy) Mugello Circuit	9 June	(Brazil) Bruno Bonifacio	(Italy) Luca Ghiotto	(Brazil) Bruno Bonifacio	(Italy) Prema Powerteam	(Switzerland) Kevin Jörg
3	Sprint	(Italy) Mugello Circuit	10 June		(Italy) Luca Ghiotto	(Uruguay) Santiago Urrutia	(Italy) BVM	(Uruguay) Santiago Urrutia
4	Feature	(Italy) Misano World Circuit	7 July	(Italy) Luca Ghiotto	(Italy) Luca Ghiotto	(Italy) Luca Ghiotto	(Italy) Prema Powerteam	(Uruguay) Santiago Urrutia
4	Feature	(Italy) Misano World Circuit	8 July	(Italy) Luca Ghiotto	(Brazil) Nicolas Costa	(Brazil) Nicolas Costa	(Italy) Euronova Racing by Fortec	(Uruguay) Santiago Urrutia
4	Sprint	(Italy) Misano World Circuit	8 July		(Uruguay) Santiago Urrutia	(Brazil) Nicolas Costa	(Italy) Euronova Racing by Fortec	(Switzerland) Kevin Jörg
5	Feature	(Austria) Red Bull Ring	4 August	(Italy) Luca Ghiotto	(Venezuela) Samin Gómez Briceno	(Italy) Luca Ghiotto	(Italy) Prema Powerteam	(Uruguay) Santiago Urrutia
5	Sprint	(Austria) Red Bull Ring	5 August		(San Marino) Emanuele Zonzini	(Uruguay) Santiago Urrutia	(Italy) BVM	(Uruguay) Santiago Urrutia
5	Feature	(Austria) Red Bull Ring	5 August	(Italy) Luca Ghiotto	(Italy) Luca Ghiotto	(Brazil) Bruno Bonifacio	(Italy) Prema Powerteam	(Uruguay) Santiago Urrutia
6	Feature	(Italy) Autodromo Enzo e Dino Ferrari, Imola	1 September	(Brazil) Bruno Bonifacio	(Italy) Luca Ghiotto	(Italy) Luca Ghiotto	(Italy) Prema Powerteam	(Switzerland) Kevin Jörg
6	Feature	(Italy) Autodromo Enzo e Dino Ferrari, Imola	2 September	(Italy) Luca Ghiotto	(Italy) Luca Ghiotto	(Italy) Luca Ghiotto	(Italy) Prema Powerteam	(United Kingdom) Gregor Ramsay
6	Sprint	(Italy) Autodromo Enzo e Dino Ferrari, Imola	2 September		(Brazil) Nicolas Costa	(San Marino) Emanuele Zonzini	(Italy) Euronova Racing by Fortec	(United Kingdom) Gregor Ramsay
7	Feature	(Italy) ACI Vallelunga Circuit	15 September	(Brazil) Nicolas Costa	(Brazil) Nicolas Costa	(Brazil) Nicolas Costa	(Italy) Euronova Racing by Fortec	(Uruguay) Santiago Urrutia
7	Feature	(Italy) ACI Vallelunga Circuit	15 September	(Brazil) Nicolas Costa	(Brazil) Nicolas Costa	(Brazil) Nicolas Costa	(Italy) Euronova Racing by Fortec	(Switzerland) Kevin Jörg
7	Sprint	(Italy) ACI Vallelunga Circuit	16 September		(Brazil) Nicolas Costa	(United Kingdom) Gregor Ramsay	(Switzerland) Jenzer Motorsport	(United Kingdom) Gregor Ramsay
8	Feature	(Italy) Autodromo Nazionale Monza	29 September	(Uruguay) Santiago Urrutia	(Uruguay) Santiago Urrutia	(Italy) Antonio Giovinazzi	(Italy) BVM	(Italy) Antonio Giovinazzi
8	Sprint	(Italy) Autodromo Nazionale Monza	29 September		(Uruguay) Santiago Urrutia	(Uruguay) Santiago Urrutia	(Italy) BVM	(Uruguay) Santiago Urrutia
8	Feature	(Italy) Autodromo Nazionale Monza	30 September	(Italy) Luca Ghiotto	(Brazil) Nicolas Costa	(Italy) Antonio Giovinazzi	(Italy) BVM	(Italy) Antonio Giovinazzi

European Series
Both championships

== Championship standings ==
- Points were awarded as follows:

	1	2	3	4	5	6	7	8	9	10	PP	FL
Feature races	20	15	12	10	8	5	4	3	2	1	**1**	1
Sprint	13	11	9	7	6	5	4	3	2	1		1

=== European Series ===
==== Drivers' standings ====
Pos	Driver	VAL (Spain)			HUN (Hungary)			MUG (Italy)			MIS (Italy)			RBR (Austria)			IMO (Italy)			VLL (Italy)			MNZ (Italy)			Pts
1	(Brazil) Nicolas Costa	6	5	1	**1**	2	4	3	6	6	3	1	1	5	9	Ret	2	3	2	**1**	**1**	3	6	3	2	266
2	(Italy) Luca Ghiotto	**1**	1	Ret	3	3	8	**1**	10	7	**1**	**Ret**	Ret	**1**	4	**4**	1	**1**	6	DSQ	3	6	3	5	**DSQ**	246
3	(Brazil) Bruno Bonifacio	3	3	Ret	Ret	**1**	1	2	**1**	3	2	4	2	2	2	1	**Ret**	2	9	10	5	12	Ret	8	Ret	219
4	(Uruguay) Santiago Urrutia	8	9	4	2	5	2	5	3	1	5	3	8	3	1	3	Ret	NC	4	3	6	5	**4**	1	3	207
5	(San Marino) Emanuele Zonzini	4	2	Ret	8	6	5	4	4	2	4	2	Ret	8	3	2	6	4	1	2	2	8	2	Ret	Ret	200
6	(Switzerland) Kevin Jörg	2	**4**	2	Ret	11	3	7	2	4	7	5	3	6	5	5	4	Ret	5	5	4	2	5	4	9	176
7	(Venezuela) Samin Gómez Briceno	5	6	3	6	8	Ret	12	5	5	6	8	4	4	11	11	3	6	Ret	4	8	4	Ret	10	4	123
8	(United Kingdom) Gregor Ramsay	9	7	5	5	7	Ret	6	7	Ret	9	Ret	6	7	10	6	5	5	3	6	9	1	Ret	13	Ret	96
9	(Italy) Giorgio Roda	7	11	Ret	4	4	Ret	Ret	8	9	8	6	5	9	6	7	WD	WD	WD	7	7	13	8	6	Ret	72
10	(Venezuela) Francisco Javier Amado	11	8	6	7	9	6	11	9	10				Ret	8	10	9	9	Ret	8	Ret	11	Ret	Ret	8	49
11	(Venezuela) Juan Branger	10	10	7	Ret	10	7	9	Ret	12	11	7	9	WD	WD	WD	Ret	8	7	9	12	9	11	11	10	43
Ineligible drivers
	(Italy) Antonio Giovinazzi																						1	2	1	0
	(Italy) Michele Beretta							10	Ret	8	12	Ret	Ret	10	Ret	8	8	Ret	Ret	Ret	11	7	7	7	5	0
	(Brazil) Antonio Furlan							8	Ret	11	10	Ret	7	Ret	7	9	7	7	8	Ret	10	10	9	12	6	0
	(Indonesia) Sean Gelael																						10	9	7	0
Pos	Driver	VAL (Spain)			HUN (Hungary)			MUG (Italy)			MIS (Italy)			RBR (Austria)			IMO (Italy)			VLL (Italy)			MNZ (Italy)			Pts

Colour	Result
Gold	Winner
Silver	Second place
Bronze	Third place
Green	Points classification
Blue	Non-points classification
Blue	Non-classified finish (NC)
Purple	Retired, not classified (Ret)
Red	Did not qualify (DNQ)
Red	Did not pre-qualify (DNPQ)
Black	Disqualified (DSQ)
White	Did not start (DNS)
White	Withdrew (WD)
White	Race cancelled (C)
Blank	Did not practice (DNP)
Blank	Did not arrive (DNA)
Blank	Excluded (EX)

**Bold** – Pole
Italics – Fastest Lap

==== Rookies' standings ====
Pos	Driver	VAL (Spain)			HUN (Hungary)			MUG (Italy)			MIS (Italy)			RBR (Austria)			IMO (Italy)			VLL (Italy)			MNZ (Italy)			Pts
1	(Uruguay) Santiago Urrutia	8	9	4	2	5	2	5	3	1	5	3	8	3	1	3	Ret	NC	4	3	6	5	4	1	3	337
2	(Switzerland) Kevin Jörg	2	4	2	Ret	11	3	7	2	4	7	5	3	6	5	5	4	Ret	5	5	4	2	5	4	9	300
3	(United Kingdom) Gregor Ramsay	9	7	5	5	7	Ret	6	7	Ret	9	Ret	6	7	10	6	5	5	3	6	9	1	Ret	13	Ret	232
4	(Venezuela) Juan Branger	10	10	7	Ret	10	7	9	Ret	12	11	7	9	WD	WD	WD	Ret	8	7	9	12	9	11	11	10	153
5	(Venezuela) Francisco Javier Amado	11	8	6	7	9	6	11	9	10				Ret	8	10	9	9	Ret	8	Ret	11	Ret	Ret	8	149
6	(Italy) Antonio Giovinazzi																						1	2	1	51
7	(Indonesia) Sean Gelael																						10	9	7	29
Pos	Driver	VAL (Spain)			HUN (Hungary)			MUG (Italy)			MIS (Italy)			RBR (Austria)			IMO (Italy)			VLL (Italy)			MNZ (Italy)			Pts

==== Teams' standings ====
Pos	Team	VAL (Spain)			HUN (Hungary)			MUG (Italy)			MIS (Italy)			RBR (Austria)			IMO (Italy)			VLL (Italy)			MNZ (Italy)			Pts
1	(Italy) Euronova Racing by Fortec	4	2	1	**1**	2	4	3	4	2	3	1	1	5	3	2	2	3	1	**1**	**1**	3	2	3	2	333
2	(Italy) Prema Powerteam	**1**	1	Ret	3	**1**	1	**1**	**1**	3	**1**	4	2	**1**	2	1	1	**1**	6	7	3	6	3	5	**DSQ**	324
3	(Italy) BVM	8	9	4	2	5	2	5	3	1	5	3	8	3	1	3	Ret	NC	4	3	6	5	1	1	1	225
4	(Switzerland) Jenzer Motorsport	2	**4**	2	5	7	3	6	2	4	6	5	3	4	5	5	3	5	3	4	4	1	5	4	4	219
5	(Italy) DIEGI Motorsport	11	8	6	7	9	6	11	9	10				Ret	8	10	9	9	Ret	8	Ret	11	Ret	Ret	8	49
6	(Italy) JD Motorsport	10	10	7	Ret	10	7	9	Ret	12	11	7	9	WD	WD	WD	Ret	8	7	9	12	9	11	11	10	43
Ineligible teams
	(Italy) Cram Competition							8	Ret	8	10	Ret	7	10	7	8	7	7	8	Ret	10	7	7	7	5	0
Pos	Driver	VAL (Spain)			HUN (Hungary)			MUG (Italy)			MIS (Italy)			RBR (Austria)			IMO (Italy)			VLL (Italy)			MNZ (Italy)			Pts

=== Italian Series ===
==== Drivers' standings ====
Pos	Driver	MUG (Italy)			MIS (Italy)			RBR (Austria)			IMO (Italy)			VLL (Italy)			MNZ (Italy)			Pts
1	(Brazil) Nicolas Costa	3	6	6	3	1	1	5	9	Ret	2	3	2	**1**	**1**	3	6	3	2	194
2	(Italy) Luca Ghiotto	**1**	10	7	**1**	**Ret**	Ret	**1**	4	**4**	1	**1**	6	DSQ	3	6	3	5	**DSQ**	175
3	(San Marino) Emanuele Zonzini	4	4	2	4	2	Ret	8	3	2	6	4	1	2	2	8	2	Ret	Ret	160
4	(Uruguay) Santiago Urrutia	5	3	1	5	3	8	3	1	3	Ret	NC	4	3	6	5	**4**	1	3	158
5	(Brazil) Bruno Bonifacio	2	**1**	3	2	4	2	2	2	1	**Ret**	2	9	10	5	12	Ret	8	Ret	157
6	(Switzerland) Kevin Jörg	7	2	4	7	3	5	6	5	5	4	Ret	5	5	4	2	5	4	9	122
7	(Venezuela) Samin Gómez Briceno	12	5	5	6	8	4	4	11	11	3	6	Ret	4	8	4	Ret	10	4	88
8	(United Kingdom) Gregor Ramsay	6	7	Ret	9	Ret	6	7	10	6	5	5	3	6	9	1	Ret	13	Ret	71
9	(Italy) Giorgio Roda	Ret	8	9	8	6	5	9	6	7	WD	WD	WD	7	7	13	8	6	Ret	46
10	(Brazil) Antonio Furlan	8	Ret	11	10	Ret	7	Ret	7	9	7	7	8	Ret	10	10	9	12	6	34
11	(Italy) Michele Beretta	10	Ret	8	12	Ret	Ret	10	Ret	8	8	Ret	Ret	Ret	11	7	7	7	5	31
12	(Venezuela) Juan Branger	9	Ret	12	11	7	9	WD	WD	WD	Ret	8	7	9	12	9	11	11	10	20
13	(Venezuela) Francisco Javier Amado	11	9	10				Ret	8	10	9	9	Ret	8	Ret	11	Ret	Ret	8	17
Ineligible drivers
	(Italy) Antonio Giovinazzi																1	2	1	0
	(Indonesia) Sean Gelael																10	9	7	0
Pos	Driver	MUG (Italy)			MIS (Italy)			RBR (Austria)			IMO (Italy)			VLL (Italy)			MNZ (Italy)			Pts

Colour	Result
Gold	Winner
Silver	Second place
Bronze	Third place
Green	Points classification
Blue	Non-points classification
Blue	Non-classified finish (NC)
Purple	Retired, not classified (Ret)
Red	Did not qualify (DNQ)
Red	Did not pre-qualify (DNPQ)
Black	Disqualified (DSQ)
White	Did not start (DNS)
White	Withdrew (WD)
White	Race cancelled (C)
Blank	Did not practice (DNP)
Blank	Did not arrive (DNA)
Blank	Excluded (EX)

**Bold** – Pole
Italics – Fastest Lap

==== Teams' standings ====
Pos	Team	MUG (Italy)			MIS (Italy)			RBR (Austria)			IMO (Italy)			VLL (Italy)			MNZ (Italy)			Pts
1	(Italy) Euronova Racing by Fortec	3	4	2	3	1	1	5	3	2	2	3	1	**1**	**1**	3	2	3	2	249
2	(Italy) Prema Powerteam	**1**	**1**	3	**1**	4	2	**1**	2	1	1	**1**	6	7	3	6	3	5	**DSQ**	235
3	(Italy) BVM	5	3	1	5	3	8	3	1	3	Ret	NC	4	3	6	5	1	1	1	178
4	(Switzerland) Jenzer Motorsport	6	2	4	6	5	3	4	5	5	3	5	3	4	4	1	5	4	4	161
5	(Italy) Cram Competition	8	Ret	8	10	Ret	7	10	7	8	7	7	8	Ret	10	7	7	7	5	51
6	(Italy) JD Motorsport	9	Ret	12	11	7	9	WD	WD	WD	Ret	8	7	9	12	9	11	11	10	18
7	(Italy) DIEGI Motorsport	11	9	10				Ret	8	10	9	9	Ret	8	Ret	11	Ret	Ret	8	17
Pos	Driver	MUG (Italy)			MIS (Italy)			RBR (Austria)			IMO (Italy)			VLL (Italy)			MNZ (Italy)			Pts
