= 2011 Formula Abarth season =

2011 Formula Abarth

Seasons
- ← 2010 2012 →

The 2011 Formula Abarth season was the seventh season of the former Formula Azzurra, and the second under its guise of "Formula Abarth". It was the first split in European and Italian series.

The Italian Championship began on 17 April in Vallelunga, while European Championship on 8 May in Valencia. They finished together on 16 October in Monza.

In the Italian championship, Patric Niederhauser won the series racing for Jenzer Motorsport with five wins and eight podiums at 149 points, thirteen ahead of runner-up and future Formula One driver Sergey Sirotkin who drove for Euronova Racing by Fortec. Third place was taken by Michaël Hêche, driving for BVM, a further five points behind Sirotkin.

The European championship saw Sirotkin win the series with five wins and 10 podiums at a points tally of 175, with Niederhauser 37 points behind. Hêche also took third place for the European Championship at 98 points.

== Teams and drivers ==
| Team | No. | Driver | Rounds |
|---|---|---|---|
| (Italy) Prema Powerteam | 2 | (Brazil) Bruno Bonifacio | 7–10 |
| (Italy) Prema Powerteam | 3 | (Italy) Luca Ghiotto | All |
| (Italy) Prema Powerteam | 11 | (Italy) Vicky Piria | All |
| (Italy) Uboldi Corse | 5 | (Italy) Luca Defendi | 1 |
| (Italy) BVM | 7 | (Spain) Gerard Barrabeig | All |
| (Italy) BVM | 8 | (Italy) Lorenzo Camplese | 1–4 |
| (Italy) BVM | 9 | (Italy) Mario Marasca | All |
| (Italy) BVM | 10 | (Switzerland) Michaël Hêche | All |
| (Italy) BVM | 16 | (Italy) Gregor Ramsay | 9–10 |
| (Italy) Euronova Racing by Fortec | 12 | (Russia) Sergey Sirotkin | 6–10 |
| (Italy) Euronova Racing by Fortec | 13 | (Russia) Dmitry Suranovich | 7–10 |
| (Italy) Euronova Racing by Fortec | 15 | (San Marino) Emanuele Zonzini | 10 |
| (Italy) Euronova Racing by Fortec | 35 | (Italy) Alessandra Brena | 1, 3–5 |
| (Italy) Euronova Racing by Fortec | 51 | (Japan) Yoshitaka Kuroda | 1, 3–6, 8–9 |
| (Italy) Composit Motorsport | 14 | (Italy) Paolo Bonetti | 9–10 |
| (Italy) Composit Motorsport | 15 | (San Marino) Emanuele Zonzini | 1, 3–6, 8–9 |
| (Italy) Composit Motorsport | 48 | (New Zealand) Nick Cassidy | 8 |
| (Switzerland) Jenzer Motorsport | 18 | (Switzerland) Patric Niederhauser | All |
| (Switzerland) Jenzer Motorsport | 19 | (Romania) Robert Visoiu | All |
| (Switzerland) Jenzer Motorsport | 20 | (Russia) Sergey Sirotkin | 1–5 |
| (Switzerland) Jenzer Motorsport | 20 | (Venezuela) Samin Gómez | 7–10 |
| (Switzerland) Jenzer Motorsport | 22 | (Switzerland) Kevin Jörg | 9–10 |
| (Italy) Cram Competition | 21 | (Italy) Giorgio Roda | 1–9 |
| (Italy) Cram Competition | 23 | (Brazil) Victor Franzoni | 6 |
| (Italy) Cram Competition | 39 | (Brazil) Nicolas Costa | 1–9 |
| (Italy) JD Motorsport | 24 | (Italy) Antonio Spavone | 1, 3–10 |
| (Italy) JD Motorsport | 25 | (Italy) Riccardo Agostini | 5–10 |
| (Italy) JD Motorsport | 26 | (Switzerland) Jimmy Antunes | 7–10 |
| (Italy) JD Motorsport | 41 | (Italy) Dario Orsini | 4–6, 8 |
| (United States) EuroInternational | 29 | (Indonesia) Dustin Sofyan | 2, 4, 6–9 |
| (United States) EuroInternational | 30 | (Venezuela) Samin Gómez | 2, 4 |
| (United States) EuroInternational | 30 | (Italy) Lorenzo Camplese | 6–9 |
| (Italy) Diegi Motorsport | 31 | (Italy) Lorenzo Foglia | 1, 3–4 |
| (Italy) Island Motorsport | 31 | (Italy) Lorenzo Foglia | 5–6, 9 |
| (Italy) Island Motorsport | 45 | (Italy) Andrea Barbirato | 5 |
| (Italy) Island Motorsport | 46 | (Uruguay) Santiago Urrutia | 9–10 |
| (Italy) Villorba Corse | 33 | (Italy) Riccardo Agostini | 1–4 |
| (Italy) Victoria World | 37 | (South Africa) Roman de Beer | 1, 3–4 |
| (Costa Rica) Team Costarica | 38 | (Venezuela) Valeria Carballo | 9–10 |
| (Italy) Emmebi Motorsport | 41 | (Italy) Dario Orsini | 1, 3, 9 |
| (Italy) TomCat Racing | 45 | (Italy) Andrea Barbirato | 1 |

Class
European/Italian Championship
National Trophy

== Race calendar and results ==
On 19 November 2010, the calendar for both series was presented in a press conference held in Varano.

| Round | | Circuit | Country | Date | Pole position | Fastest lap | Winning driver | Winning team |
|---|---|---|---|---|---|---|---|---|
| 1 | R1 | Vallelunga Circuit, Campagnano | Italy | 17 April | (Switzerland) Patric Niederhauser | (Switzerland) Patric Niederhauser | (Switzerland) Patric Niederhauser | (Switzerland) Jenzer Motorsport |
| 1 | R2 | Vallelunga Circuit, Campagnano | Italy | 17 April | | (Switzerland) Patric Niederhauser | (Switzerland) Michaël Hêche | (Italy) BVM |
| 2 | R1 | Valencia Circuit | Spain | 7 May | (Switzerland) Michaël Hêche | (Switzerland) Patric Niederhauser | (Switzerland) Patric Niederhauser | (Switzerland) Jenzer Motorsport |
| 2 | R2 | Valencia Circuit | Spain | 8 May | | (Russia) Sergey Sirotkin | (Russia) Sergey Sirotkin | (Switzerland) Jenzer Motorsport |
| 3 | R1 | Autodromo Riccardo Paletti, Varano | Italy | 22 May | (Switzerland) Patric Niederhauser | (Switzerland) Patric Niederhauser | (Switzerland) Patric Niederhauser | (Switzerland) Jenzer Motorsport |
| 3 | R2 | Autodromo Riccardo Paletti, Varano | Italy | 22 May | | (Switzerland) Patric Niederhauser | (Italy) Lorenzo Camplese | (Italy) BVM |
| 4 | R1 | Misano World Circuit, Misano Adriatico | Italy | 4 June | (Spain) Gerard Barrabeig | (Switzerland) Michaël Hêche | (Spain) Gerard Barrabeig | (Italy) BVM |
| 4 | R2 | Misano World Circuit, Misano Adriatico | Italy | 5 June | | (South Africa) Roman de Beer | (Romania) Robert Visoiu | (Switzerland) Jenzer Motorsport |
| 5 | R1 | Autodromo Enzo e Dino Ferrari, Imola | Italy | 16 July | (Italy) Luca Ghiotto | (Spain) Gerard Barrabeig | (Switzerland) Patric Niederhauser | (Switzerland) Jenzer Motorsport |
| 5 | R2 | Autodromo Enzo e Dino Ferrari, Imola | Italy | 17 July | | (Italy) Luca Ghiotto | (Switzerland) Michaël Hêche | (Italy) BVM |
| 6 | R1 | Circuit de Spa-Francorchamps | Belgium | 6 August | (Switzerland) Michaël Hêche | (Italy) Lorenzo Camplese | (Russia) Sergey Sirotkin | (Italy) Euronova Racing by Fortec |
| 6 | R2 | Circuit de Spa-Francorchamps | Belgium | 7 August | | (Switzerland) Patric Niederhauser | (Switzerland) Patric Niederhauser | (Switzerland) Jenzer Motorsport |
| 7 | R1 | Red Bull Ring, Spielberg | Austria | 27 August | (Switzerland) Patric Niederhauser | (Russia) Sergey Sirotkin | (Russia) Sergey Sirotkin | (Italy) Euronova Racing by Fortec |
| 7 | R2 | Red Bull Ring, Spielberg | Austria | 28 August | | (Switzerland) Patric Niederhauser | (Switzerland) Patric Niederhauser | (Switzerland) Jenzer Motorsport |
| 8 | R1 | Mugello Circuit | Italy | 2 October | (Russia) Sergey Sirotkin | (Russia) Sergey Sirotkin | (Switzerland) Patric Niederhauser | (Switzerland) Jenzer Motorsport |
| 8 | R2 | Mugello Circuit | Italy | 2 October | | (Italy) Mario Marasca^{1} | (Italy) Mario Marasca | (Italy) BVM |
| 8 | R2 | Mugello Circuit | Italy | 2 October | | (Italy) Mario Marasca^{1} | (Italy) Lorenzo Camplese | (United States) EuroInternational |
| 9 | R1 | Autodromo Nazionale Monza | Italy | 16 October | (Switzerland) Michaël Hêche | (Italy) Luca Ghiotto | (Russia) Sergey Sirotkin | (Italy) Euronova Racing by Fortec |
| 9 | R2 | Autodromo Nazionale Monza | Italy | 16 October | | (Switzerland) Patric Niederhauser^{1} | (Switzerland) Patric Niederhauser | (Switzerland) Jenzer Motorsport |
| 10 | R1 | Circuit de Catalunya | Spain | 30 October | (Switzerland) Michaël Hêche | (Switzerland) Patric Niederhauser | (Russia) Sergey Sirotkin | (Italy) Euronova Racing by Fortec |
| 10 | R2 | Circuit de Catalunya | Spain | 30 October | | (Switzerland) Patric Niederhauser | (Romania) Robert Visoiu | (Switzerland) Jenzer Motorsport |

European championship
Italian championship
Both championships
- ^{1} Fastest lap recorded by Yoshitaka Kuroda, but he was ineligible to score the fastest lap point.

== Championship standings ==
- Points were awarded as follows:

| | 1 | 2 | 3 | 4 | 5 | 6 | 7 | 8 | 9 | 10 | PP | FL |
|---|---|---|---|---|---|---|---|---|---|---|---|---|
| Race 1 | 20 | 15 | 12 | 10 | 8 | 6 | 4 | 3 | 2 | 1 | **1** | 1 |
| Race 2 | 13 | 11 | 9 | 7 | 6 | 5 | 4 | 3 | 2 | 1 | | 1 |

=== Italian Championship ===
==== Drivers' standings ====
| Pos | Driver | VLL (Italy) | | VAR (Italy) | | MIS (Italy) | | IMO (Italy) | | SPA (Belgium) | | MUG (Italy) | | MNZ (Italy) | | Pts |
|---|---|---|---|---|---|---|---|---|---|---|---|---|---|---|---|---|
| 1 | (Switzerland) Patric Niederhauser | **1** | 4 | **1** | 2 | DSQ | 8 | 1 | Ret | Ret | 1 | 1 | 16 | 3 | 1 | 149 |
| 2 | (Russia) Sergey Sirotkin | 14 | 3 | 3 | 3 | 2 | 5 | 3 | Ret | 1 | 8 | **3** | 3 | 1 | Ret | 136 |
| 3 | (Switzerland) Michaël Hêche | 3 | 1 | 9 | 7 | 3 | 10 | 2 | 1 | **2** | 10 | 4 | 9 | **2** | 5 | 131 |
| 4 | (Spain) Gerard Barrabeig | 9 | Ret | 2 | 4 | **1** | Ret | 4 | 2 | 3 | 5 | 11 | 5 | 10 | Ret | 101 |
| 5 | (Brazil) Nicolas Costa | 6 | 2 | 4 | 6 | Ret | 6 | 6 | 5 | 7 | 4 | Ret | 21 | 5 | 4 | 84 |
| 6 | (Romania) Robert Visoiu | 8 | 8 | 16 | 5 | 4 | 1 | Ret | 3 | 8 | 17 | 7 | Ret | 19 | 2 | 69 |
| 7 | (Italy) Riccardo Agostini | 4 | 9 | 8 | 13 | 10 | 12 | 5 | 6 | 5 | 7 | 8 | 15 | 4 | Ret | 66 |
| 8 | (Italy) Mario Marasca | 10 | 10 | 11 | 10 | 9 | 11 | 7 | 7 | 6 | 6 | 6 | 2 | DNS | 15 | 57 |
| 9 | (Italy) Luca Ghiotto | 7 | 7 | Ret | 15 | 7 | 3 | **Ret** | 12 | 9 | 15 | 10 | 14 | 7 | Ret | 42 |
| 10 | (Italy) Lorenzo Camplese | 21 | Ret | 6 | 1 | 6 | 20 | | | 15 | 3 | 5 | 1 | 11 | DNS | 40 |
| 11 | (South Africa) Roman de Beer | 5 | 5 | 5 | 14 | Ret | 2 | | | | | | | | | 36 |
| 12 | (San Marino) Emanuele Zonzini | 13 | 12 | 12 | 8 | 8 | 9 | 8 | 4 | 10 | 12 | 17 | 8 | 15 | 6 | 34 |
| 13 | (Italy) Antonio Spavone | 12 | 14 | 10 | 9 | Ret | 19 | 12 | 8 | 11 | 11 | 15 | 12 | 22 | 9 | 12 |
| 14 | (Brazil) Bruno Bonifacio | | | | | | | | | | | 14 | 6 | 9 | Ret | 10 |
| 15 | (Italy) Vicky Piria | 11 | 11 | 14 | Ret | 14 | 15 | Ret | 10 | 16 | 13 | 12 | 18 | 8 | Ret | 9 |
| 16 | (Venezuela) Samin Gómez | | | | | 13 | 16 | | | | | Ret | 10 | 12 | 7 | 8 |
| 17 | (New Zealand) Nick Cassidy | | | | | | | | | | | 16 | 7 | | | 6 |
| 18 | (Uruguay) Santiago Urrutia | | | | | | | | | | | | | 13 | 8 | 4 |
| 19 | (Italy) Giorgio Roda | 18 | Ret | 13 | 16 | 12 | 14 | 9 | 9 | 13 | Ret | Ret | 13 | 14 | Ret | 4 |
| 20 | (Italy) Dario Orsini | 15 | Ret | 17 | 12 | 11 | 13 | 10 | 11 | 12 | 14 | 19 | 11 | 18 | Ret | 4 |
| 21 | (Brazil) Victor Franzoni | | | | | | | | | DSQ | 9 | | | | | 3 |
| 22 | (Switzerland) Kevin Jörg | | | | | | | | | | | | | 21 | 10 | 2 |
| 23 | (Italy) Paolo Bonetti | | | | | | | | | | | | | 16 | 11 | 1 |
| 24 | (Russia) Dmitry Suranovich | | | | | | | | | | | 13 | 17 | 23 | Ret | 1 |
| 25 | (Italy) Lorenzo Foglia | 19 | Ret | 18 | Ret | 16 | 18 | 11 | Ret | 14 | 16 | 18 | 22 | 17 | 13 | 0 |
| 26 | (Italy) Alessandra Brena | 16 | 15 | 15 | 11 | 15 | 17 | Ret | DNS | | | | | | | 0 |
| 27 | (Switzerland) Jimmy Antunes | | | | | | | | | | | Ret | 20 | Ret | 12 | 0 |
| 28 | (Italy) Andrea Barbirato | 20 | 16 | | | | | 13 | Ret | | | | | | | 0 |
| 29 | (Italy) Luca Defendi | 17 | 13 | | | | | | | | | | | | | 0 |
| 30 | (Venezuela) Valeria Carballo | | | | | | | | | | | | | 20 | 14 | 0 |
| | (Italy) Gregor Ramsay | | | | | | | | | | | | | Ret | DNS | 0 |
Ineligible drivers
| | (Indonesia) Dustin Sofyan | | | | | 17 | 7 | | | 4 | Ret | 9 | 4 | Ret | DNS | 0 |
National Trophy
| 1 | (Japan) Yoshitaka Kuroda | 2 | 6 | 7 | Ret | 5 | 4 | Ret | 13 | Ret | 2 | 2 | 19 | 6 | 3 | 192 |
| Pos | Driver | VLL (Italy) | | VAR (Italy) | | MIS (Italy) | | IMO (Italy) | | SPA (Belgium) | | MUG (Italy) | | MNZ (Italy) | | Pts |

| Colour | Result |
|---|---|
| Gold | Winner |
| Silver | Second place |
| Bronze | Third place |
| Green | Points classification |
| Blue | Non-points classification |
| Blue | Non-classified finish (NC) |
| Purple | Retired, not classified (Ret) |
| Red | Did not qualify (DNQ) |
| Red | Did not pre-qualify (DNPQ) |
| Black | Disqualified (DSQ) |
| White | Did not start (DNS) |
| White | Withdrew (WD) |
| White | Race cancelled (C) |
| Blank | Did not practice (DNP) |
| Blank | Did not arrive (DNA) |
| Blank | Excluded (EX) |

**Bold** – Pole
Italics – Fastest Lap

==== Teams' standings ====
| Pos | Team | VLL (Italy) | | VAR (Italy) | | MIS (Italy) | | IMO (Italy) | | SPA (Belgium) | | MUG (Italy) | | MNZ (Italy) | | Pts |
|---|---|---|---|---|---|---|---|---|---|---|---|---|---|---|---|---|
| 1 | (Switzerland) Jenzer Motorsport | 1 | 3 | 1 | 2 | 2 | 1 | 1 | 3 | 8 | 1 | 1 | 10 | 3 | 1 | 182 |
| 2 | (Italy) BVM | 3 | 1 | 2 | 1 | 1 | 10 | 2 | 1 | 2 | 5 | 4 | 2 | 2 | 5 | 176 |
| 3 | (Italy) Cram Competition | 6 | 2 | 4 | 6 | 12 | 6 | 6 | 5 | 7 | 4 | Ret | 13 | 5 | 4 | 85 |
| 4 | (Italy) Euronova Racing by Fortec | 16 | 15 | 15 | 11 | 15 | 17 | Ret | DNS | 1 | 8 | 3 | 3 | 1 | Ret | 70 |
| 5 | (Italy) JD Motorsport | 12 | 14 | 10 | 9 | 11 | 13 | 5 | 6 | 5 | 7 | 8 | 12 | 4 | 9 | 54 |
| 6 | (Italy) Prema Powerteam | 7 | 7 | 14 | 15 | 7 | 3 | Ret | 10 | 9 | 13 | 10 | 6 | 7 | Ret | 47 |
| 7 | (Italy) Composit Motorsport | 13 | 12 | 12 | 8 | 8 | 9 | 8 | 4 | 10 | 12 | 16 | 7 | 15 | 6 | 35 |
| 8 | (Italy) Villorba Corse | 4 | 9 | 8 | 13 | 10 | 12 | | | | | | | | | 22 |
| 9 | (Italy) Victoria World | | | 5 | 14 | Ret | 2 | | | | | | | | | 19 |
| 10 | (United States) EuroInternational | | | | | 13 | 7 | | | 4 | 3 | 5 | 1 | 11 | DNS | 12 |
| 11 | (Italy) Diegi Motorsport (Italy) Island Motorsport | 19 | Ret | 18 | Ret | 16 | 18 | 11 | Ret | 14 | 16 | 18 | 22 | 13 | 8 | 4 |
| 12 | (Italy) Emmebi Motorsport | 15 | Ret | 17 | 12 | | | | | | | | | 18 | Ret | 0 |
| 13 | (Italy) TomCat Racing | 20 | 16 | | | | | | | | | | | | | 0 |
| 14 | (Italy) Uboldi Corse | 17 | 13 | | | | | | | | | | | | | 0 |
| 15 | (Costa Rica) Team Costarica | | | | | | | | | | | | | 20 | 14 | 0 |
| Pos | Team | VLL (Italy) | | VAR (Italy) | | MIS (Italy) | | IMO (Italy) | | SPA (Belgium) | | MUG (Italy) | | MNZ (Italy) | | Pts |

| Colour | Result |
|---|---|
| Gold | Winner |
| Silver | Second place |
| Bronze | Third place |
| Green | Points classification |
| Blue | Non-points classification |
| Blue | Non-classified finish (NC) |
| Purple | Retired, not classified (Ret) |
| Red | Did not qualify (DNQ) |
| Red | Did not pre-qualify (DNPQ) |
| Black | Disqualified (DSQ) |
| White | Did not start (DNS) |
| White | Withdrew (WD) |
| White | Race cancelled (C) |
| Blank | Did not practice (DNP) |
| Blank | Did not arrive (DNA) |
| Blank | Excluded (EX) |

=== European Championship ===
==== Drivers' standings ====
| Pos | Driver | VAL (Spain) | | MIS (Italy) | | SPA (Belgium) | | RBR (Austria) | | MUG (Italy) | | MNZ (Italy) | | CAT (Spain) | | Pts |
|---|---|---|---|---|---|---|---|---|---|---|---|---|---|---|---|---|
| 1 | (Russia) Sergey Sirotkin | 2 | 1 | 2 | 5 | 1 | 8 | 1 | 2 | **3** | 3 | 1 | Ret | 1 | 4 | 175 |
| 2 | (Switzerland) Patric Niederhauser | 1 | 2 | DSQ | 8 | Ret | 1 | **2** | 1 | 1 | 16 | 3 | 1 | Ret | 2 | 138 |
| 3 | (Switzerland) Michaël Hêche | **13** | 4 | 3 | 10 | **2** | 10 | 4 | 4 | 4 | 9 | **2** | 5 | **Ret** | 8 | 98 |
| 4 | (Romania) Robert Visoiu | 6 | 6 | 4 | 1 | 8 | 17 | Ret | 5 | 7 | Ret | 19 | 2 | 5 | 1 | 81 |
| 5 | (Spain) Gerard Barrabeig | 5 | 5 | **1** | Ret | 3 | 5 | 8 | Ret | 11 | 5 | 10 | Ret | 6 | 10 | 72 |
| 6 | (Italy) Luca Ghiotto | 12 | Ret | 7 | 3 | 9 | 15 | 3 | 6 | 10 | 14 | 7 | Ret | 2 | 3 | 65 |
| 7 | (Italy) Lorenzo Camplese | 3 | 7 | 6 | 20 | 15 | 3 | 7 | 14 | 5 | 1 | 11 | DNS | | | 59 |
| 8 | (Italy) Riccardo Agostini | 7 | 9 | 10 | 12 | 5 | 7 | 5 | 3 | 8 | 15 | 4 | Ret | Ret | 7 | 54 |
| 9 | (Brazil) Nicolas Costa | 4 | 10 | Ret | 6 | 7 | 4 | 6 | 9 | Ret | 21 | 5 | 4 | | | 52 |
| 10 | (Italy) Mario Marasca | 8 | 8 | 9 | 11 | 6 | 6 | 10 | 11 | 6 | 2 | DNS | 15 | Ret | 5 | 46 |
| 11 | (Indonesia) Dustin Sofyan | Ret | 3 | 17 | 7 | 4 | Ret | 12 | 15 | 9 | 4 | Ret | DNS | | | 33 |
| 12 | (Japan) Yoshitaka Kuroda | | | 5 | 4 | Ret | 2 | | | 2 | 19 | 6 | 3 | | | 26 |
| 13 | (San Marino) Emanuele Zonzini | | | 8 | 9 | 10 | 12 | | | 17 | 8 | 15 | 6 | 3 | 6 | 23 |
| 14 | (Italy) Antonio Spavone | | | Ret | 19 | 11 | 11 | 11 | 8 | 15 | 12 | 22 | 9 | 4 | 11 | 18 |
| 15 | (Brazil) Bruno Bonifacio | | | | | | | Ret | 7 | 14 | 6 | 9 | Ret | Ret | 9 | 14 |
| 16 | (South Africa) Roman de Beer | | | Ret | 2 | | | | | | | | | | | 12 |
| 17 | (Venezuela) Samin Gómez | 10 | 12 | 13 | 16 | | | 13 | 10 | Ret | 10 | 12 | 7 | 11 | 14 | 11 |
| 18 | (Italy) Vicky Piria | 9 | 11 | 14 | 15 | 16 | 13 | 15 | 12 | 12 | 18 | 8 | Ret | 9 | 15 | 8 |
| 19 | (Switzerland) Kevin Jörg | | | | | | | | | | | 21 | 10 | 7 | 13 | 7 |
| 20 | (Switzerland) Jimmy Antunes | | | | | | | 9 | 16 | Ret | 20 | Ret | 12 | 8 | 12 | 6 |
| 21 | (Uruguay) Santiago Urrutia | | | | | | | | | | | 13 | 8 | 13 | 17 | 5 |
| 22 | (New Zealand) Nick Cassidy | | | | | | | | | 14 | 7 | | | | | 4 |
| 23 | (Brazil) Victor Franzoni | | | | | DSQ | 9 | | | | | | | | | 2 |
| 24 | (Italy) Paolo Bonetti | | | | | | | | | | | 16 | 11 | 14 | 16 | 2 |
| 25 | (Russia) Dmitry Suranovich | | | | | | | 16 | 13 | 13 | 17 | 23 | Ret | 10 | 18 | 1 |
| 26 | (Italy) Dario Orsini | | | 11 | 13 | 12 | 14 | | | 19 | 11 | 18 | Ret | | | 0 |
| 27 | (Italy) Giorgio Roda | 11 | Ret | 12 | 14 | 13 | Ret | 14 | 17 | Ret | 13 | 14 | Ret | | | 0 |
| 28 | (Italy) Gregor Ramsay | | | | | | | | | | | Ret | DNS | 12 | Ret | 0 |
| 29 | (Italy) Lorenzo Foglia | | | 16 | 18 | 14 | 16 | | | 18 | 22 | 17 | 13 | | | 0 |
| 30 | (Venezuela) Valeria Carballo | | | | | | | | | | | 20 | 14 | 15 | Ret | 0 |
| 31 | (Italy) Alessandra Brena | | | 15 | 17 | | | | | | | | | | | 0 |
| Pos | Driver | VAL (Spain) | | MIS (Italy) | | SPA (Belgium) | | RBR (Austria) | | MUG (Italy) | | MNZ (Italy) | | CAT (Spain) | | Pts |

| Colour | Result |
|---|---|
| Gold | Winner |
| Silver | Second place |
| Bronze | Third place |
| Green | Points classification |
| Blue | Non-points classification |
| Blue | Non-classified finish (NC) |
| Purple | Retired, not classified (Ret) |
| Red | Did not qualify (DNQ) |
| Red | Did not pre-qualify (DNPQ) |
| Black | Disqualified (DSQ) |
| White | Did not start (DNS) |
| White | Withdrew (WD) |
| White | Race cancelled (C) |
| Blank | Did not practice (DNP) |
| Blank | Did not arrive (DNA) |
| Blank | Excluded (EX) |

**Bold** – Pole
Italics – Fastest Lap

==== Teams' standings ====
| Pos | Team | VAL (Spain) | | MIS (Italy) | | SPA (Belgium) | | RBR (Austria) | | MUG (Italy) | | MNZ (Italy) | | CAT (Spain) | | Pts |
|---|---|---|---|---|---|---|---|---|---|---|---|---|---|---|---|---|
| 1 | (Switzerland) Jenzer Motorsport | 1 | 1 | 2 | 1 | 8 | 1 | 2 | 1 | 1 | 10 | 3 | 1 | 5 | 1 | 173 |
| 2 | (Italy) Euronova Racing by Fortec | | | 5 | 4 | 1 | 2 | 1 | 2 | 2 | 3 | 1 | Ret | 1 | 4 | 148 |
| 3 | (Italy) BVM | 3 | 4 | 1 | 11 | 2 | 5 | 4 | 4 | 4 | 2 | 2 | 5 | 6 | 5 | 134 |
| 4 | (Italy) Prema Powerteam | 9 | 11 | 7 | 3 | 9 | 13 | 3 | 6 | 10 | 6 | 7 | Ret | 2 | 3 | 71 |
| 5 | (Italy) JD Motorsport | | | 11 | 13 | 5 | 7 | 5 | 3 | 8 | 12 | 4 | 9 | 4 | 7 | 62 |
| 6 | (United States) EuroInternational | 10 | 3 | 13 | 7 | 4 | 3 | 7 | 14 | 5 | 1 | 11 | DNS | | | 60 |
| 7 | (Italy) Cram Competition | 4 | 10 | 12 | 6 | 7 | 4 | 6 | 9 | Ret | 13 | 5 | 4 | | | 52 |
| 8 | (Italy) Composit Motorsport | | | 8 | 9 | 10 | 12 | | | 16 | 7 | 15 | 11 | 14 | 16 | 12 |
| 9 | (Italy) Scuderia Victoria World | | | Ret | 2 | | | | | | | | | | | 11 |
| 10 | (Italy) Villorba Corse | 7 | 9 | 10 | 12 | | | | | | | | | | | 7 |
| 11 | (Italy) Diegi Motorsport (Italy) Island Motorsport | | | 16 | 18 | 14 | 16 | | | 18 | 22 | 13 | 8 | 13 | 17 | 5 |
| 12 | (Costa Rica) Team Costarica | | | | | | | | | | | 20 | 14 | 15 | Ret | 0 |
| Pos | Team | VAL (Spain) | | MIS (Italy) | | SPA (Belgium) | | RBR (Austria) | | MUG (Italy) | | MNZ (Italy) | | CAT (Spain) | | Pts |

==== Rookies' standings ====
| Pos | Driver | VAL (Spain) | | MIS (Italy) | | SPA (Belgium) | | RBR (Austria) | | MUG (Italy) | | MNZ (Italy) | | CAT (Spain) | | Pts |
|---|---|---|---|---|---|---|---|---|---|---|---|---|---|---|---|---|
| 1 | (Spain) Gerard Barrabeig | 5 | 5 | 1 | Ret | 3 | 5 | 8 | Ret | 11 | 5 | 10 | Ret | 6 | 10 | 158 |
| 2 | (Italy) Luca Ghiotto | 12 | Ret | 7 | 3 | 9 | 15 | 3 | 6 | 10 | 14 | 7 | Ret | 2 | 3 | 157 |
| 3 | (Romania) Robert Visoiu | 6 | 6 | 4 | 1 | 8 | 17 | Ret | 5 | 7 | Ret | 19 | 2 | 5 | 1 | 148 |
| 4 | (Italy) Giorgio Roda | 11 | Ret | 12 | 14 | 13 | Ret | 14 | 17 | Ret | 13 | 14 | Ret | | | 70 |
| 5 | (San Marino) Emanuele Zonzini | | | 8 | 9 | 10 | 12 | | | 17 | 8 | 15 | 6 | 3 | 6 | 62 |
| 6 | (Russia) Dmitry Suranovich | | | | | | | 16 | 13 | 13 | 17 | 23 | Ret | 10 | 18 | 48 |
| 7 | (Uruguay) Santiago Urrutia | | | | | | | | | | | 13 | 8 | 13 | 17 | 31 |
| 8 | (Italy) Dario Orsini | | | 11 | 13 | 12 | 14 | | | 19 | 11 | 18 | Ret | | | 30 |
| 9 | (Switzerland) Kevin Jörg | | | | | | | | | | | 21 | 10 | 7 | 13 | 27 |
| 10 | (Italy) Paolo Bonetti | | | | | | | | | | | 16 | 11 | 14 | 16 | 23 |
| 11 | (Italy) Lorenzo Foglia | | | 16 | 18 | 14 | 16 | | | 18 | 22 | 17 | 13 | | | 16 |
| 12 | (Brazil) Victor Franzoni | | | | | DSQ | 9 | | | | | | | | | 11 |
| 13 | (Italy) Alessandra Brena | | | 15 | 17 | | | | | | | | | | | 9 |
| Pos | Driver | VAL (Spain) | | MIS (Italy) | | SPA (Belgium) | | RBR (Austria) | | MUG (Italy) | | MNZ (Italy) | | CAT (Spain) | | Pts |
