= 2016 Italian GT Championship =

25th season of the Italian GT championship

Seasons
- ← 2015 2017 →

The 2016 Italian GT Championship was the 25th season of the Italian GT Championship, the grand tourer-style sports car racing founded by the Italian automobile club (Automobile Club d'Italia). The season started on 30 April 2016 at Monza and ended on 16 October 2016 at Mugello after seven double-header meetings.

== Teams and drivers ==
=== SuperGT3 ===
Team	Car	No.	Driver	Rounds
(Italy) Solaris Motorsport	Aston Martin Vantage GT3	7	(Italy) Massimiliano Mugelli	All
(Italy) Solaris Motorsport	Aston Martin Vantage GT3	7	(Italy) Francesco Sini	All
(San Marino) Audi Sport Italia	Audi R8 LMS	8	(Italy) Marco Mapelli	All
(San Marino) Audi Sport Italia	Audi R8 LMS	8	(Portugal) Filipe Albuquerque	1–6
(San Marino) Audi Sport Italia	Audi R8 LMS	8	(Belgium) Laurens Vanthoor	7
(Italy) Antonelli Motorsport	Lamborghini Huracán GT3	9	(Italy) Alberto Di Folco	7
(Italy) Antonelli Motorsport	Lamborghini Huracán GT3	9	(South Africa) Adrian Zaugg	7
(Italy) Antonelli Motorsport	Lamborghini Huracán GT3	25	(Italy) Riccardo Agostini	1–6
(Italy) Antonelli Motorsport	Lamborghini Huracán GT3	25	(Italy) Alberto Di Folco	1–6
(Italy) Easy Race	Ferrari 488 GT3	10	(Brazil) Jaime Melo	7
(Italy) Easy Race	Ferrari 488 GT3	10	(Italy) Niccolò Schirò	7
(Italy) Easy Race	Ferrari 488 GT3	11	(Italy) Ferdinando Geri	1–6
(Italy) Easy Race	Ferrari 488 GT3	11	(Italy) Daniel Mancinelli	1–3, 6
(Italy) Easy Race	Ferrari 488 GT3	11	(Italy) Andrea Montermini	4
(Italy) Easy Race	Ferrari 488 GT3	11	(Italy) Niccolò Schirò	5
(Italy) Easy Race	Ferrari 488 GT3	38	(Italy) Daniel Mancinelli	4
(Italy) Easy Race	Ferrari 488 GT3	38	(United States) Gregory Romanelli	4
(Italy) Ombra Srl	Lamborghini Huracán GT3	12	(Italy) Alex Frassineti	All
(Italy) Ombra Srl	Lamborghini Huracán GT3	12	(Italy) Stefano Gattuso	All
(Italy) BMW Team Italia	BMW M6 GT3	15	(Italy) Alberto Cerqui	All
(Italy) BMW Team Italia	BMW M6 GT3	15	(Italy) Stefano Comandini	All
(Italy) BMW Team Italia	BMW M6 GT3	50	(Italy) Alex Zanardi	7
(Italy) Imperiale Racing	Lamborghini Huracán GT3	16	(Italy) Mirko Bortolotti	All
(Italy) Imperiale Racing	Lamborghini Huracán GT3	16	(Netherlands) Jeroen Mul	All
(Italy) Imperiale Racing	Lamborghini Huracán GT3	32	(Italy) Giovanni Venturini	All
(Italy) Imperiale Racing	Lamborghini Huracán GT3	32	(Italy) Stefano Pezzucchi	1–6
(Italy) Imperiale Racing	Lamborghini Huracán GT3	32	(Finland) Patrick Kujala	7
(Italy) Drive Technology Italia Srl	Nissan GT-R Nismo GT3	23	(Italy) Francesca Linossi	1–6
(Italy) Drive Technology Italia Srl	Nissan GT-R Nismo GT3	23	(Italy) Lorenzo Bontempelli	1–4
(Italy) Drive Technology Italia Srl	Nissan GT-R Nismo GT3	23	(United Kingdom) Sean Walkinshaw	5–6
(Italy) Ebimotors	Lamborghini Huracán GT3	24	(Italy) Emanuele Busnelli	4
(Italy) Ebimotors	Lamborghini Huracán GT3	24	(Italy) Fabio Babini	4
(Switzerland) Black Bull Swiss Racing	Ferrari 488 GT3	46	(Italy) Stefano Gai	All
(Switzerland) Black Bull Swiss Racing	Ferrari 488 GT3	46	(Italy) Mirko Venturi	All

=== GT3 ===
Team	Car	No.	Driver	Rounds
(Italy) Krypton Motorsport	Porsche 911 GT3 R	53	(Italy) Luca Pastorelli	1–6
(Italy) Krypton Motorsport	Porsche 911 GT3 R	53	(Italy) Nicola Pastorelli	1–6
(Italy) Krypton Motorsport	Porsche 911 GT3 R	53	(Italy) Mauro Deodati	7
(Italy) Krypton Motorsport	Porsche 911 GT3 R	53	(Italy) Emanuele Romani	7
(San Marino) Audi Sport Italia	Audi R8 LMS	58	(Argentina) Matías Russo	2–7
(San Marino) Audi Sport Italia	Audi R8 LMS	58	(San Marino) Emanuele Zonzini	2–7
(Italy) Malucelli Motorsport	Ferrari 458 Italia GT3	60	(San Marino) Marco Galassi	1–5, 7
(Italy) Malucelli Motorsport	Ferrari 458 Italia GT3	60	(Italy) Simone Tempesta	3–5
(Italy) Cars Engineering	Lamborghini Gallardo GT3	61	(Italy) Ferdinando Monfardini	1–3
(Italy) Cars Engineering	Lamborghini Gallardo GT3	61	(Italy) Ronnie Valori	1–3
(Italy) Imperiale Racing	Lamborghini Gallardo GT3	63	(Italy) Vito Postiglione	2–7
(Italy) Imperiale Racing	Lamborghini Gallardo GT3	63	(Italy) Andrea Gagliardini	2–6
(Italy) Imperiale Racing	Lamborghini Gallardo GT3	63	(Italy) Giacomo Barri	7
(Italy) Easy Race	Ferrari 458 Italia GT3	69	(Italy) Francesco La Mazza	7
(Italy) Easy Race	Ferrari 458 Italia GT3	69	(Italy) Daniel Mancinelli	7
(Italy) Scuderia Baldini 27 Network	Ferrari 458 Italia GT3	72	(Italy) Eddie Cheever III	All
(Italy) Scuderia Baldini 27 Network	Ferrari 458 Italia GT3	72	(Italy) Federico Leo	All
(Italy) Scuderia Baldini 27 Network	Ferrari 458 Italia GT3	91	(Italy) Lorenzo Casè	6–7
(Italy) Scuderia Baldini 27 Network	Ferrari 458 Italia GT3	91	(Italy) Simone Tempesta	6
(Italy) Scuderia Baldini 27 Network	Ferrari 458 Italia GT3	91	(Italy) Lorenzo Bontempelli	7
(Italy) Ebimotors	Porsche 911 GT3 R	88	(Italy) Alessandro Baccani	All
(Italy) Ebimotors	Porsche 911 GT3 R	88	(Italy) Paolo Venerosi	All

=== SuperGTCup ===
Team	Car	No.	Driver	Rounds
(Italy) Antonelli Motorsport	Lamborghini Huracán Super Trofeo	102	(Italy) Simone Sartori	1–4, 7
(Italy) Antonelli Motorsport	Lamborghini Huracán Super Trofeo	102	(Italy) Omar Galbiati	1–3
(Italy) Antonelli Motorsport	Lamborghini Huracán Super Trofeo	102	(Romania) Kikko Galbiati	4
(Italy) Antonelli Motorsport	Lamborghini Huracán Super Trofeo	102	(Italy) Manuel Deodati	7
(Italy) Antonelli Motorsport	Lamborghini Huracán Super Trofeo	103	(Italy) Massimo Mantovani	All
(Italy) Antonelli Motorsport	Lamborghini Huracán Super Trofeo	103	(Italy) Lorenzo Casè	1
(Italy) Antonelli Motorsport	Lamborghini Huracán Super Trofeo	103	(Italy) Pierluigi Alessandri	2–3, 6–7
(Italy) Antonelli Motorsport	Lamborghini Huracán Super Trofeo	103	(Italy) Pietro Negra	4
(Italy) Antonelli Motorsport	Lamborghini Huracán Super Trofeo	103	(Italy) Lorenzo Veglia	5
(Italy) Antonelli Motorsport	Lamborghini Huracán Super Trofeo	104	(Italy) Matteo Desideri	All
(Italy) Antonelli Motorsport	Lamborghini Huracán Super Trofeo	104	(Japan) Takashi Kasai	1, 3–7
(Italy) Antonelli Motorsport	Lamborghini Huracán Super Trofeo	104	(Italy) Pietro Negra	2
(Italy) Antonelli Motorsport	Lamborghini Huracán Super Trofeo	109	(Italy) Marco Magli	1–3
(Italy) Antonelli Motorsport	Lamborghini Huracán Super Trofeo	109	(Russia) Mikhail Spiridonov	1
(Italy) Antonelli Motorsport	Lamborghini Huracán Super Trofeo	109	(Italy) Lorenzo Casè	2
(Italy) Antonelli Motorsport	Lamborghini Huracán Super Trofeo	109	(Italy) Piero Necchi	3–6
(Italy) Antonelli Motorsport	Lamborghini Huracán Super Trofeo	109	(Italy) Loris Spinelli	4–6
(Italy) Antonelli Motorsport	Lamborghini Huracán Super Trofeo	112	(Italy) Edoardo Liberati	5
(Italy) Antonelli Motorsport	Lamborghini Huracán Super Trofeo	112	(China) Kang Ling	5
(Italy) Antonelli Motorsport	Lamborghini Huracán Super Trofeo	132	(Romania) Kikko Galbiati	6–7
(Italy) Antonelli Motorsport	Lamborghini Huracán Super Trofeo	132	(Italy) Pietro Negra	6
(Italy) Antonelli Motorsport	Lamborghini Huracán Super Trofeo	132	(Italy) Piero Necchi	7
(Italy) Vincenzo Sospiri Racing	Lamborghini Huracán Super Trofeo	105	(Israel) Bar Baruch	All
(Italy) Vincenzo Sospiri Racing	Lamborghini Huracán Super Trofeo	105	(China) Liang Jiatong	1–6
(Italy) Vincenzo Sospiri Racing	Lamborghini Huracán Super Trofeo	105	(Italy) Jacopo Faccioni	7
(Italy) Vincenzo Sospiri Racing	Lamborghini Huracán Super Trofeo	106	(Brazil) Nicolas Costa	All
(Italy) Vincenzo Sospiri Racing	Lamborghini Huracán Super Trofeo	106	(Brazil) Fernando Croce Gomes	1–2
(Italy) Vincenzo Sospiri Racing	Lamborghini Huracán Super Trofeo	106	(Israel) Amir Krenzia	3–4
(Italy) Vincenzo Sospiri Racing	Lamborghini Huracán Super Trofeo	106	(Japan) Yuki Nemoto	5–7
(Italy) Vincenzo Sospiri Racing	Lamborghini Huracán Super Trofeo	114	(Israel) Amir Krenzia	6
(Italy) Vincenzo Sospiri Racing	Lamborghini Huracán Super Trofeo	114	(China) Liang Jiatong	7
(Italy) Vincenzo Sospiri Racing	Lamborghini Huracán Super Trofeo	114	(Brazil) Jaime Melo	7
(Italy) Raton Racing	Lamborghini Huracán Super Trofeo	107	(Italy) Angelo Fabrizio Comi	All
(Italy) Raton Racing	Lamborghini Huracán Super Trofeo	107	(Italy) Roberto Tanca	All
(Italy) Raton Racing	Lamborghini Huracán Super Trofeo	108	(Italy) Andrea D'Amico	1
(Italy) Raton Racing	Lamborghini Huracán Super Trofeo	108	(South Africa) Adrian Zaugg	1–6
(Italy) Raton Racing	Lamborghini Huracán Super Trofeo	108	(Italy) Antonio D'Amico	2–7
(Italy) GDL Racing	Lamborghini Huracán Super Trofeo	111	(Italy) Gianluca de Lorenzi	1–2
(Italy) GDL Racing	Lamborghini Huracán Super Trofeo	111	(Italy) Piero Necchi	1–2
(Italy) Petri Corse Motorsport	Lamborghini Huracán Super Trofeo	114	(Italy) Davide Roda	2
(Italy) Petri Corse Motorsport	Lamborghini Huracán Super Trofeo	116	(Italy) Mauro Trentin	6–7
(Italy) Petri Corse Motorsport	Lamborghini Huracán Super Trofeo	116	(Switzerland) Walter Palazzo	6
(Italy) Petri Corse Motorsport	Lamborghini Huracán Super Trofeo	116	(Italy) Davide Amaduzzi	7
(Italy) Imperiale Racing	Lamborghini Huracán Super Trofeo	131	(Italy) Simone Pellegrinelli	5–6
(Italy) Imperiale Racing	Lamborghini Huracán Super Trofeo	135	(Portugal) Carina Lima	6–7
(Italy) Imperiale Racing	Lamborghini Huracán Super Trofeo	135	(Italy) Andrea Palma	6–7

=== GTCup ===
Team	Car	No.	Driver	Rounds
(Italy) Imperiale Racing	Lamborghini Gallardo Super Trofeo	146	(Italy) Ivan Benvenuti	All
(Italy) Imperiale Racing	Lamborghini Gallardo Super Trofeo	146	(Italy) Luca De Marchi	All
(Italy) Drive Technology Italia Srl	Porsche 997 Cup	155	(Italy) Gianluca Carboni	1, 4–7
(Italy) Drive Technology Italia Srl	Porsche 997 Cup	155	(Italy) "Magister"	1
(Italy) Drive Technology Italia Srl	Porsche 997 Cup	155	(Switzerland) Davide Durante	4–7
(Italy) Drive Technology Italia Srl	Porsche 997 Cup	156	(Switzerland) Walter Palazzo	4–5
(Italy) Drive Technology Italia Srl	Porsche 997 Cup	156	(Italy) Mauro Trentin	4–5
(Ukraine) Master-KR Racing	Ferrari 458 Challenge	159	(Italy) Vincenzo Sauto	All
(Ukraine) Master-KR Racing	Ferrari 458 Challenge	159	(Italy) Mirko Zanardini	All
(Ukraine) Master-KR Racing	Ferrari 458 Challenge	161	(Italy) Mauro Deodati	1–6
(Ukraine) Master-KR Racing	Ferrari 458 Challenge	161	(Italy) Emanuele Romani	1–6
(Italy) Victoria Speed Motorsport	Ferrari 458 Challenge Evo	160	(Italy) Dario Caso	1–2, 6–7
(Italy) Victoria Speed Motorsport	Ferrari 458 Challenge Evo	160	(Italy) Sossio Del Prete	1–2, 6–7
(Italy) Scuderia Giudici	Maserati GT Trofeo	169	(Italy) Gianni Giudici	1
(Italy) Vago	Porsche 997 Cup	171	(Italy) Enrico Di Leo	2, 7
(Italy) Vago	Porsche 997 Cup	171	(Italy) "Poppy"	2, 7
(Italy) Ebimotors	Porsche 997 Cup	174	(Italy) Carlo Curti	All
(Italy) Ebimotors	Porsche 997 Cup	174	(Italy) Lino Curti	All
(Italy) Ebimotors	Porsche 997 Cup	175	(Italy) Nicola Benucci	1–4
(Italy) Ebimotors	Porsche 997 Cup	175	(Italy) Tommaso Maino	1–4
(Italy) Ebimotors	Porsche 997 Cup	175	(Italy) Enrico Quinzio	7
(Italy) Ebimotors	Porsche 997 Cup	175	(Italy) Domenico Schiattarella	7
(Italy) CAAL Racing	Ferrari 458 Challenge Evo	176	(Italy) Leonardo Baccarelli	4
(Italy) CAAL Racing	Ferrari 458 Challenge Evo	176	(Italy) Luigi Ferrara	4
(Italy) MP Racing	Ferrari 458 Challenge	177	(Italy) Corinna Gostner	4
(Italy) MP Racing	Ferrari 458 Challenge	177	(Italy) Manuela Gostner	4
(Italy) MP Racing	Ferrari 458 Challenge	178	(Italy) David Gostner	4
(Italy) MP Racing	Ferrari 458 Challenge	178	(Italy) Thomas Gostner	4
(Italy) MP Racing	Ferrari 458 Challenge	179	(Italy) "Babalus"	4
(Italy) MP Racing	Ferrari 458 Challenge	179	(Italy) Erich Prinoth	4

=== GT4 ===
Team	Car	No.	Driver	Rounds
(Italy) Autorlando Sport	Porsche 997 GT4	209	(Italy) Dario Cerati	4–5, 7
(Italy) Autorlando Sport	Porsche 997 GT4	209	(Italy) Maurizio Fondi	4
(Italy) Autorlando Sport	Porsche 997 GT4	209	(Italy) Giuseppe Ghezzi	5
(Italy) Autorlando Sport	Porsche 997 GT4	209	(Italy) Lorenzo Uttini	7
(Italy) Scuderia Giudici	Ginetta G50	211	(Italy) Claudio Giudici	1

=== Cayman ===
All entries use a Cayman GT4 Clubsport.

Team	No.	Driver	Rounds
(Italy) Ebimotors	251	(Italy) Riccardo Pera	2–7
(Italy) Ebimotors	252	(Italy) Gianluigi Piccioli	2–6
(Italy) Ebimotors	252	(Italy) Marco Iannotta	2–3
(Italy) Ebimotors	252	(Italy) Sabino De Castro	5–7
(Switzerland) CVG Motorsport	253	(Italy) Federico Zangari	2–5
(Switzerland) CVG Motorsport	253	(Italy) Matteo Zangari	2–5
(Switzerland) CVG Motorsport	253	(Italy) Giovanni Coggiola	6
(Switzerland) CVG Motorsport	253	(Italy) Victor Coggiola	6
(Switzerland) CVG Motorsport	253	(Italy) Dario Baruchelli	7
(Switzerland) CVG Motorsport	253	(Italy) Ivano Giuliani	7
(Italy) Krypton Motorsport	254	(Italy) Riccardo Bianco	2–4
(Italy) Krypton Motorsport	254	(Italy) Sabino De Castro	2–4
(Italy) Dinamic Motorsport	256	(Venezuela) Jonathan Cecotto	2–7
(Italy) Dinamic Motorsport	256	(Italy) Niccolò Mercatali	2–7
(Italy) Kinetic	280	(Italy) Nicola Neri	2, 7
(Italy) Kinetic	280	(Italy) Filippo Bellini	7
(Italy) Kinetic	299	(Italy) Camillo Paparelli	2
(Italy) Kinetic	299	(Russia) Mikhail Spiridonov	2

== Race calendar and results ==
All races are scheduled to be held in Italy.

Round		Circuit	Date	SuperGT3 winner	GT3 winner	SuperGTCup winner	GTCup winner	GT4 winner	Cayman winner
1	R1	Autodromo Nazionale Monza, Monza	30 April	(San Marino) No. 8 Audi Sport Italia	(Italy) No. 53 Krypton Motorsport	(Italy) No. 106 Vincenzo Sospiri Racing	(Italy) No. 146 Imperiale Racing	(Italy) No. 211 Scuderia Giudici	No entries
1	R1	Autodromo Nazionale Monza, Monza	30 April	(Portugal) Filipe Albuquerque (Italy) Marco Mapelli	(Italy) Luca Pastorelli (Italy) Nicola Pastorelli	(Brazil) Nicolas Costa (Brazil) Fernando Croce Gomes	(Italy) Ivan Benvenuti (Italy) Luca De Marchi	(Italy) Claudio Giudici	No entries
1	R2	Autodromo Nazionale Monza, Monza	1 May	(Switzerland) No. 46 Black Bull Swiss Racing	(Italy) No. 61 Cars Engineering	(Italy) No. 111 GDL Racing	(Italy) No. 146 Imperiale Racing	(Italy) No. 211 Scuderia Giudici	No entries
1	R2	Autodromo Nazionale Monza, Monza	1 May	(Italy) Stefano Gai (Italy) Mirko Venturi	(Italy) Ferdinando Monfardini (Italy) Ronnie Valori	(Italy) Gianluca de Lorenzi (Italy) Piero Necchi	(Italy) Ivan Benvenuti (Italy) Luca De Marchi	(Italy) Claudio Giudici	No entries
2	R1	Autodromo Enzo e Dino Ferrari, Imola	29 May	(Italy) No. 16 Imperiale Racing	(Italy) No. 63 Imperiale Racing	(Italy) No. 104 Antonelli Motorsport	(Italy) No. 160 Victoria Speed Motorsport	No entries	(Italy) No. 251 Ebimotors
2	R1	Autodromo Enzo e Dino Ferrari, Imola	29 May	(Italy) Mirko Bortolotti (Netherlands) Jeroen Mul	(Italy) Andrea Gagliardini (Italy) Vito Postiglione	(Italy) Matteo Desideri (Italy) Pietro Negra	(Italy) Dario Caso (Italy) Sossio Del Prete	No entries	(Italy) Riccardo Pera
2	R2	Autodromo Enzo e Dino Ferrari, Imola	29 May	(San Marino) No. 8 Audi Sport Italia	(San Marino) No. 58 Audi Sport Italia	(Italy) No. 111 GDL Racing	(Italy) No. 171 Vago	No entries	(Italy) No. 251 Ebimotors
2	R2	Autodromo Enzo e Dino Ferrari, Imola	29 May	(Portugal) Filipe Albuquerque (Italy) Marco Mapelli	(Argentina) Matías Russo (San Marino) Emanuele Zonzini	(Italy) Gianluca de Lorenzi (Italy) Piero Necchi	(Italy) Enrico Di Leo (Italy) "Poppy"	No entries	(Italy) Riccardo Pera
3	R1	Misano World Circuit Marco Simoncelli, Misano Adriatico	12 June	(Italy) No. 15 BMW Team Italia	(Italy) No. 63 Imperiale Racing	(Italy) No. 106 Vincenzo Sospiri Racing	(Italy) No. 146 Imperiale Racing	No entries	(Italy) No. 254 Krypton Motorsport
3	R1	Misano World Circuit Marco Simoncelli, Misano Adriatico	12 June	(Italy) Alberto Cerqui (Italy) Stefano Comandini	(Italy) Andrea Gagliardini (Italy) Vito Postiglione	(Brazil) Nicolas Costa (Israel) Amir Krenzia	(Italy) Ivan Benvenuti (Italy) Luca De Marchi	No entries	(Italy) Riccardo Bianco (Italy) Sabino De Castro
3	R2	Misano World Circuit Marco Simoncelli, Misano Adriatico	12 June	(Switzerland) No. 46 Black Bull Swiss Racing	(San Marino) No. 58 Audi Sport Italia	(Italy) No. 105 Vincenzo Sospiri Racing	(Italy) No. 175 Ebimotors	No entries	(Italy) No. 251 Ebimotors
3	R2	Misano World Circuit Marco Simoncelli, Misano Adriatico	12 June	(Italy) Stefano Gai (Italy) Mirko Venturi	(Argentina) Matías Russo (San Marino) Emanuele Zonzini	(Israel) Bar Baruch (China) Liang Jiatong	(Italy) Nicola Benucci (Italy) Tommaso Maino	No entries	(Italy) Riccardo Pera
4	R1	Mugello Circuit, Scarperia	17 July	(Italy) No. 25 Antonelli Motorsport	(Italy) No. 72 Scuderia Baldini 27 Network	(Italy) No. 108 Raton Racing	(Italy) No. 179 MP Racing	(Italy) No. 209 Autorlando Sport	(Italy) No. 256 Dinamic Motorsport
4	R1	Mugello Circuit, Scarperia	17 July	(Italy) Riccardo Agostini (Italy) Alberto Di Folco	(Italy) Eddie Cheever III (Italy) Federico Leo	(South Africa) Adrian Zaugg (Italy) Antonio d'Amico	(Italy) "Babalus" (Italy) Erich Prinoth	(Italy) Dario Cerati (Italy) Maurizio Fondi	(Venezuela) Jonathan Cecotto (Italy) Niccolò Mercatali
4	R2	Mugello Circuit, Scarperia	17 July	(Italy) No. 16 Imperiale Racing	(Italy) No. 53 Krypton Motorsport	(Italy) No. 104 Antonelli Motorsport	(Italy) No. 155 Drive Technology Italia Srl	(Italy) No. 209 Autorlando Sport	(Italy) No. 251 Ebimotors
4	R2	Mugello Circuit, Scarperia	17 July	(Italy) Mirko Bortolotti (Netherlands) Jeroen Mul	(Italy) Luca Pastorelli (Italy) Nicola Pastorelli	(Italy) Matteo Desideri (Japan) Takashi Kasai	(Italy) Gianluca Carboni (Switzerland) Davide Durante	(Italy) Dario Cerati (Italy) Maurizio Fondi	(Italy) Riccardo Pera
5	R1	ACI Vallelunga Circuit, Campagnano di Roma	11 September	(Italy) No. 12 Ombra Srl	(Italy) No. 63 Imperiale Racing	(Italy) No. 112 Antonelli Motorsport	(Italy) No. 146 Imperiale Racing	(Italy) No. 209 Autorlando Sport	(Italy) No. 251 Ebimotors
5	R1	ACI Vallelunga Circuit, Campagnano di Roma	11 September	(Italy) Alex Frassineti (Italy) Stefano Gattuso	(Italy) Andrea Gagliardini (Italy) Vito Postiglione	(Italy) Leonardo Liberati (China) Kang Ling	(Italy) Ivan Benvenuti (Italy) Luca De Marchi	(Italy) Dario Cerati (Italy) Giuseppe Ghezzi	(Italy) Riccardo Pera
5	R2	ACI Vallelunga Circuit, Campagnano di Roma	11 September	(Italy) No. 25 Antonelli Motorsport	(San Marino) No. 58 Audi Sport Italia	(Italy) No. 106 Vincenzo Sospiri Racing	(Ukraine) No. 159 Master-KR Racing	(Italy) No. 209 Autorlando Sport	(Italy) No. 251 Ebimotors
5	R2	ACI Vallelunga Circuit, Campagnano di Roma	11 September	(Italy) Riccardo Agostini (Italy) Alberto Di Folco	(Argentina) Matías Russo (San Marino) Emanuele Zonzini	(Brazil) Nicolas Costa (Japan) Yuki Nemoto	(Italy) Vincenzo Sauto (Italy) Mirko Zanardini	(Italy) Dario Cerati (Italy) Giuseppe Ghezzi	(Italy) Riccardo Pera
6	R1	Autodromo Enzo e Dino Ferrari, Imola	25 September	(Italy) No. 46 Black Bull Swiss Racing	(Italy) No. 72 Scuderia Baldini 27 Network	(Italy) No. 106 Vincenzo Sospiri Racing	(Italy) No. 174 Ebimotors	No entries	(Italy) No. 251 Ebimotors
6	R1	Autodromo Enzo e Dino Ferrari, Imola	25 September	(Italy) Stefano Gai (Italy) Mirko Venturi	(Italy) Eddie Cheever III (Italy) Federico Leo	(Brazil) Nicolas Costa (Japan) Yuki Nemoto	(Italy) Carlo Curti (Italy) Lino Curti	No entries	(Italy) Riccardo Pera
6	R2	Autodromo Enzo e Dino Ferrari, Imola	25 September	(Italy) No. 16 Imperiale Racing	(Italy) No. 72 Scuderia Baldini 27 Network	(Italy) No. 106 Vincenzo Sospiri Racing	(Italy) No. 155 Drive Technology Italia Srl	No entries	(Italy) No. 251 Ebimotors
6	R2	Autodromo Enzo e Dino Ferrari, Imola	25 September	(Italy) Mirko Bortolotti (Netherlands) Jeroen Mul	(Italy) Eddie Cheever III (Italy) Federico Leo	(Brazil) Nicolas Costa (Japan) Yuki Nemoto	(Italy) Gianluca Carboni (Switzerland) Davide Durante	No entries	(Italy) Riccardo Pera
7	R1	Mugello Circuit, Scarperia	16 October	(Italy) No. 46 Black Bull Swiss Racing	(Italy) No. 91 Scuderia Baldini 27 Network	(Italy) No. 104 Antonelli Motorsport	(Italy) No. 155 Drive Technology Italia Srl	(Italy) No. 209 Autorlando Sport	(Italy) No. 252 Ebimotors
7	R1	Mugello Circuit, Scarperia	16 October	(Italy) Stefano Gai (Italy) Mirko Venturi	(Italy) Lorenzo Bontempelli (Italy) Lorenzo Casè	(Italy) Matteo Desideri (Japan) Takashi Kasai	(Italy) Gianluca Carboni (Switzerland) Davide Durante	(Italy) Dario Cerati (Italy) Lorenzo Uttini	(Italy) Sabino De Castro
7	R2	Mugello Circuit, Scarperia	16 October	(Italy) No. 50 BMW Team Italia	(Italy) No. 63 Imperiale Racing	(Italy) No. 106 Vincenzo Sospiri Racing	(Italy) No. 146 Imperiale Racing	(Italy) No. 209 Autorlando Sport	(Italy) No. 252 Ebimotors
7	R2	Mugello Circuit, Scarperia	16 October	(Italy) Alex Zanardi	(Italy) Giacomo Barri (Italy) Vito Postiglione	(Brazil) Nicolas Costa (Japan) Yuki Nemoto	(Italy) Ivan Benvenuti (Italy) Luca De Marchi	(Italy) Dario Cerati (Italy) Lorenzo Uttini	(Italy) Sabino De Castro

== Championship standings ==
Only the best twelve results count towards each championship.

=== GT3 championship ===
Pos	Driver	MNZ (Italy)		IMO (Italy)	MIS (Italy)	MUG (Italy)	VLL (Italy)	IMO (Italy)	MUG (Italy)	Points
Super GT3
1	(Italy) Stefano Gai (Italy) Mirko Venturi	**3**	1							32
2	(Italy) Mirko Bortolotti (Netherlands) Jeroen Mul	2	3							27
3	(Portugal) Filipe Albuquerque (Italy) Marco Mapelli	1	**11**							22
4	(Italy) Riccardo Agostini (Italy) Alberto Di Folco	7	2							19
5	(Italy) Lorenzo Bontempelli (Italy) Francesca Linossi	5	6							12
6	(Italy) Stefano Pezzucchi (Italy) Giovanni Venturini	8	4							11
7	(Italy) Alberto Cerqui (Italy) Stefano Comandini	4	14							9
8	(Italy) Ferdinando Geri (Italy) Daniel Mancinelli	11	5							9
9	(Italy) Massimiliano Mugelli (Italy) Francesco Sini	6	7							9
10	(Italy) Alex Frassineti (Italy) Stefano Gattuso	Ret	10							3
GT3
1	(Italy) Luca Pastorelli (Italy) Nicola Pastorelli	9	**9**							35
2	(Italy) Ferdinando Monfardini (Italy) Ronnie Valori	13	8							28
3	(Italy) Alessandro Baccani (Italy) Paolo Venerosi	10	12							27
4	(San Marino) Marco Galassi	12	13							20
	(Italy) Eddie Cheever III (Italy) Federico Leo	**Ret**	DNS							0
Pos	Driver	MNZ (Italy)		IMO (Italy)	MIS (Italy)	MUG (Italy)	VLL (Italy)	IMO (Italy)	MUG (Italy)	Points

Colour	Result
Gold	Winner
Silver	Second place
Bronze	Third place
Green	Points classification
Blue	Non-points classification
Blue	Non-classified finish (NC)
Purple	Retired, not classified (Ret)
Red	Did not qualify (DNQ)
Red	Did not pre-qualify (DNPQ)
Black	Disqualified (DSQ)
White	Did not start (DNS)
White	Withdrew (WD)
White	Race cancelled (C)
Blank	Did not practice (DNP)
Blank	Did not arrive (DNA)
Blank	Excluded (EX)

**Bold** – Pole
Italics – Fastest Lap

=== GTCup championship ===
Pos	Driver	MNZ (Italy)		IMO (Italy)	MIS (Italy)	MUG (Italy)	VLL (Italy)	IMO (Italy)	MUG (Italy)	Points
Super GTCup
1	(Brazil) Nicolas Costa (Brazil) Fernando Croce Gomes	**1**	5							27
2	(Italy) Lorenzo Casè (Italy) Massimo Mantovani	2	4							23
3	(Italy) Gianluca de Lorenzi (Italy) Piero Necchi	Ret	1							20
4	(Italy) Andrea D'Amico (South Africa) Adrian Zaugg	7	**2**							19
5	(Israel) Bar Baruch (China) Liang Jiatong	6	3							17
6	(Italy) Marco Magli (Russia) Mikhail Spiridonov	4	6							13
7	(Italy) Matteo Desideri (Japan) Takashi Kasai	3	Ret							12
8	(Italy) Angelo Fabrizio Comi (Italy) Roberto Tanca	4	8							11
9	(Italy) Omar Galbiati (Italy) Simone Sartori	10	11							6
GTCup
1	(Italy) Ivan Benvenuti (Italy) Luca De Marchi	8	7							40
2	(Italy) Nicola Benucci (Italy) Tommaso Maino	11	**9**							27
3	(Italy) Vincenzo Sauto (Italy) Mirko Zanardini	9	13							22
4	(Italy) Carlo Curti (Italy) Lino Curti	12	10							20
5	(Italy) Mauro Deodati (Italy) Emanuele Romani	Ret	12							8
6	(Italy) Gianni Giudici	14	DNS							7
7	(Italy) Gianluca Carboni (Italy) "Magister"	Ret	12							5
	(Italy) Dario Caso (Italy) Sossio Del Prete	**DNS**	DNS							5
GT4
1	(Italy) Claudio Giudici	**13**	**14**							40
Pos	Driver	MNZ (Italy)		IMO (Italy)	MIS (Italy)	MUG (Italy)	VLL (Italy)	IMO (Italy)	MUG (Italy)	Points
