= Alberto Di Folco =

Italian racing driver (born 1996)

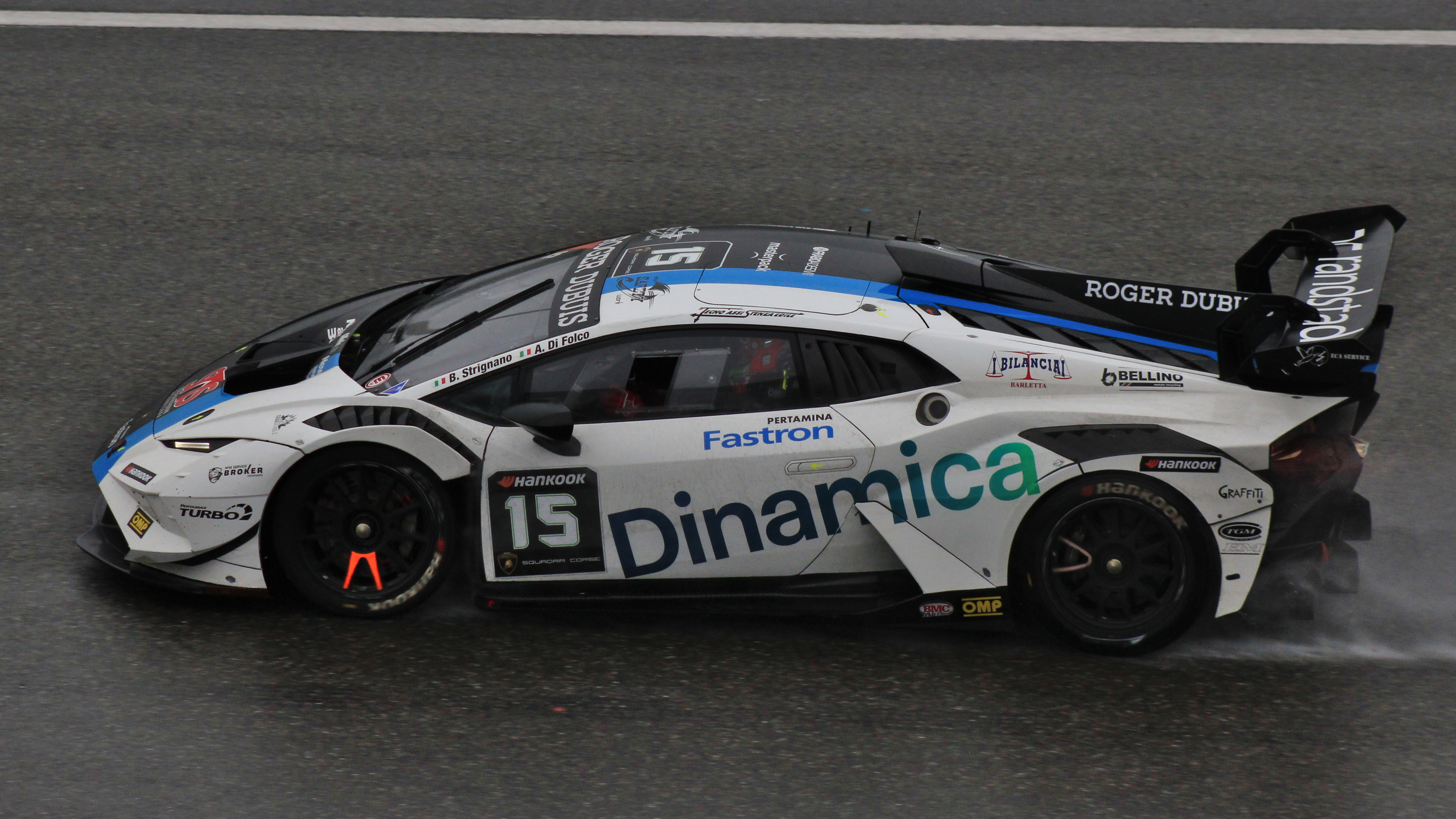
- Di Folco in 2024
- Nationality: (Italy) Italian
- Born: 21 March 1996 (age 30) Rome, Italy
- Categorisation: FIA Silver

Championship titles
- 2014: Lamborghini Super Trofeo Europe – Pro-Am

Alberto Maria Di Folco (born 21 March 1996) is an Italian racing driver who last competed in the GT World Challenge Europe Endurance Cup for Tresor Attempto Racing. Dividing his time between Lamborghini and Audi, he has finished runner-up twice in Italian GT and once in GTWC Europe.

== Career ==
Di Folco made his car racing debut in 2012, at the 6 Hours of Vallelunga, which he won in the Silver class. The following year, Di Folco joined Team Torino Motorsport to make his single-seater debut in the Formula Renault 2.0 Alps Series. After competing in the first two rounds and scoring a best result of 11th at Vallelunga, Di Folco joined ART Junior Team to race in the Formula Renault 2.0 Northern European Cup. Competing in the final four rounds in the series, Di Folco scored a best result of eighth in race three at Most.

Switching to sports cars in 2014, Di Folco joined Imperiale Racing to race in the Pro-Am class of Lamborghini Super Trofeo Europe. In his first season in the series, Di Folco won three times in class and scored six more podiums to clinch the Pro-Am title. Remaining in the series for the following year, Di Folco joined Raton Racing as he stepped up to the Pro class. In his sophomore season, Di Folco scored a lone win at Spa and three more podiums to end the year third in points. During 2015, Di Folco also made a one-off appearance in the Blancpain Sprint Series for Grasser Racing Team at Misano.

In 2016, Di Folco joined Antonelli Motorsport to race in the Super GT3 class of the Italian GT Championship. In his first season in the series, Di Folco scored wins at Mugello and Vallelunga en route to a sixth-place points finish in Super GT3. During 2016, Di Folco also made a one-off appearance in the Le Castellet round of the Blancpain Endurance Series for the same team. The following year, Di Folco joined FFF Racing Team to race in Blancpain GT Series Asia alongside Aidan Read. In his only season in the series, Di Folco scored four class podiums, including a best class result of second at Zhejiang to finish the year fourth in the Silver Cup. Joining Target Racing for the following two seasons, Di Folco primarily competed in International GT Open, two Pro-Am class podiums, as well as returning to Super Trofeo Europe competition in the latter year, winning both races at Silverstone in Pro-Am. During both years, Di Folco also raced at the 24 Hours of Spa for the same team, scoring an Am class podium in both years.

Continuing with Target Racing for 2020, Di Folco raced in Lamborghini Super Trofeo Europe alongside Kevin Rossel, scoring a lone win at the Nürburgring as the duo finished third in the Pro standings. Joining Imperiale Racing the following year, Di Folco raced in the Italian GT Endurance Championship, winning at Mugello and finishing on the podium twice more to secure runner-up honors in GT3. During 2021, Di Folco also made a one-off appearance in Lamborghini Super Trofeo Europe at Monza, in which he won race two, and also raced in the 24 Hours of Spa for GRT Grasser Racing Team.

Returning to Imperiale Racing for 2022, Di Folco raced with them in the Italian GT Sprint Championship. In his first season in the Sprint Championship, Di Folco scored wins at Monza, Imola and Mugello to end the year fourth in the overall GT3 standings. During 2022, Di Folco also made one-off appearances in GT World Challenge Europe Sprint Cup and International GT Open with the same team, as well as racing in the 24 Hours of Spa for Team Tresor. The following year, Di Folco joined Boutsen VDS to compete in both the GT World Challenge Europe Endurance and Sprint Cups. In the former, Di Folco scored a class win at Barcelona and a podium at Le Castellet en route to a fourth-place points finish in the Gold Cup. In the latter, Di Folco scored class wins at Brands Hatch, Misano and Hockenheimring to secure runner-up honors in the Gold Cup.

Transitioning to Vincenzo Sospiri Racing for 2024, Di Folco raced with them for the full Italian GT Championship Endurance Cup and for the first two rounds of the Italian GT Championship Sprint Cup. In his second full-time season in the Endurance Series, Di Folco finished on the podium in all but one race to secure runner-up honors in the overall GT3 standings. In parallel, Di Folco raced in select rounds of Lamborghini Super Trofeo Europe for Rexal Villorba Corse, scoring a lone podium at Spa to take 12th in the Pro standings. During 2024, Di Folco also made one-off appearances for Oregon Team in International GT Open, as well as in the GT World Challenge Europe Endurance Cup for Imperiale Racing.

Di Folco then returned to Tresor Attempto Racing for a dual campaign in the Italian GT Championship Endurance Cup and the GT World Challenge Europe Endurance Cup. Finishing 11th in the former's GT3 Pro-Am standings, Di Folco found more success in the latter, scoring a class podium at Monza en route to an eighth-place finish in the Silver Cup standings despite missing the finale at Barcelona. The following year, Di Folco remained with the team to race in the GT World Challenge Europe Endurance Cup. After making one start in GTWC, Di Folco remained with the team to race for the first half of the Italian GT season, in which he achieved three Pro-Am podiums in the Sprint Cup.

== Karting record ==
=== Karting career summary ===
Season	Series	Team	Position
2010	WSK Master Series — KF3	Primavera Antonina	6th
2010	Italian Open Masters — KF3		12th
2010	WSK Nations Cup — KF3	Chiesa Corse	22nd
2011	WSK Master Series — KF2	RTM; Formula K	4th
2011	WSK Euro Series — KF2	RTM; Comer S.p.a. (Note: Di Folco competed for RTM in round 1 and for Comer S.p.a. in round 4.)	55th
2011	Italian Karting Championship — KF2	RTM	5th
2011	Karting European Championship — KF2		NC
2011	WSK Final Cup — KF2	Millennium Motorsport	13th
2011	South European KF2 Trophy	RTM di Maccarone Massimiliano	24th
2011	Karting World Cup — KF2	Formula K	NC
2012	South Garda Winter Cup — KF2		11th
2012	WSK Master Series — KF2	Intrepid Driver Program	78th
2012	WSK Euro Series — KF2	Millennium Motorsport; Morsicani Racing (Note: Di Folco competed for Millenium Motorsport in rounds 2-3 and for Morsicani Racing in round 4.)	64th
2012	Karting European Championship — KF2	Millennium Motorsport	40th
2012	Italian Karting Championship — KF2		11th
2012	Karting World Cup — KF2		8th
2013	Italian Karting Championship — KZ2	Galiffa Kart	NC

== Racing record ==
=== Racing career summary ===
Season	Series	Team	Races	Wins	Poles	F/Laps	Podiums	Points	Position
2012	6 Hours of Vallelunga – Silver	Leonardo Maddalena	1	1	0	0	1	—N/a	**1st**
2013	Formula Renault 2.0 Alps Series	Team Torino Motorsport	4	0	0	0	0	0	28th
2013	Formula Renault 2.0 Northern European Cup	ART Junior Team	9	0	0	0	0	73	20th
2014	Lamborghini Super Trofeo Europe – Pro-Am	Imperiale Racing	12	3	0	1	9	129	**1st**
2014	Lamborghini Super Trofeo World Finals – Pro-Am	Imperiale Racing	2	0	0	0	0	0	NC
2015	Lamborghini Super Trofeo Europe – Pro	Raton Racing	12	1	0	1	4	90	**3rd**
2015	Blancpain Sprint Series	Grasser Racing Team	1	0	0	0	0	0	NC
2015	Blancpain Sprint Series – Silver	Grasser Racing Team	1	0	1	1	1	7	8th
2016	Italian GT Championship – Super GT3	Antonelli Motorsport	14	2	0	0	4	114	6th
2016	Blancpain GT Series Endurance Cup	Antonelli Motorsport	1	0	0	0	0	0	NC
2016	Blancpain GT Series Endurance Cup – Am	Antonelli Motorsport	1	0	0	0	0	0	NC
2017	Blancpain GT Series Asia	FFF Racing Team by ACM	12	0	0	0	1	62	8th
2017	Blancpain GT Series Asia – Silver	FFF Racing Team by ACM	12	0	0	0	3	131	4th
2017	Lamborghini Super Trofeo Asia – Pro-Am	FFF Racing Team	2	0	0	2	1	18	8th
2018	International GT Open	Target Racing	12	0	0	0	0	12	24th
2018	International GT Open – Pro-Am	Target Racing	8	0	0	0	1	21	10th
2018	Blancpain GT Series Endurance Cup	Target Racing	1	0	0	0	0	0	NC
2018	Blancpain GT Series Endurance Cup – Am	Target Racing	1	0	0	0	1	34	15th
2019	International GT Open – Pro-Am	Raton Racing by Target	8	0	0	0	1	17	13th
2019	Lamborghini Super Trofeo Europe – Pro-Am	Raton Racing by Target						31	7th
2019	Lamborghini Super Trofeo Europe – Pro	Raton Racing by Target						64	6th
2019	Blancpain GT Series Endurance Cup	Raton Racing by Target	1	0	0	0	0	0	NC
2019	Blancpain GT Series Endurance Cup – Am	Raton Racing by Target	1	0	0	0	1	28	16th
2020	Lamborghini Super Trofeo Europe – Pro	Target Racing	10	1	0	0	4	80	**3rd**
2021	Lamborghini Super Trofeo Europe – Pro	Imperiale Racing	2	1	0	0	1	25	13th
2021	Italian GT Endurance Championship – GT3	Imperiale Racing	4	1	0	0	3	50	**2nd**
2021	GT World Challenge Europe Endurance Cup	GRT Grasser Racing Team	1	0	0	0	0	0	NC
2021	GT World Challenge Europe Endurance Cup – Silver	GRT Grasser Racing Team	1	0	0	0	0	0	NC
2021	Intercontinental GT Challenge	GRT Grasser Racing Team	1	0	0	0	0	0	NC
2022	Italian GT Sprint Championship – GT3	Imperiale Racing	8	3	0	0	3	76	4th
2022	GT World Challenge Europe Sprint Cup	Imperiale Racing	2	0	0	0	0	3	22nd
2022	International GT Open	Imperiale Racing	2	0	0	0	0	4	23rd
2022	GT World Challenge Europe Endurance Cup	Audi Sport Team Tresor	1	0	0	0	0	0	NC
2022	GT World Challenge Europe Endurance Cup – Silver	Audi Sport Team Tresor	1	0	0	0	0	6	28th
2023	GT World Challenge Europe Endurance Cup	Boutsen VDS	5	0	0	0	0	0	NC
2023	GT World Challenge Europe Endurance Cup – Gold	Boutsen VDS	5	1	0	1	2	83	4th
2023	GT World Challenge Europe Sprint Cup	Boutsen VDS	10	0	0	0	0	8.5	17th
2023	GT World Challenge Europe Sprint Cup – Gold	Boutsen VDS	10	3	1	3	6	105	**2nd**
2023	Porsche Endurance Trophy Nürburgring – CUP3	Team Mathol Racing e.V.	1	0	0	0	0	0	NC
2024	Italian GT Championship Endurance Cup – GT3	Vincenzo Sospiri Racing	4	0	1	1	3	62	**2nd**
2024	Italian GT Championship Sprint Cup – GT3	Vincenzo Sospiri Racing	4	0	0	0	2	34	NC
2024	Lamborghini Super Trofeo Europe – Pro	Rexal Villorba Corse	10	0	0	0	1	29	12th
2024	GT World Challenge Europe Endurance Cup	Imperiale Racing	1	0	0	0	0	0	NC
2024	GT World Challenge Europe Endurance Cup – Gold	Imperiale Racing	1	0	0	0	1	0	NC
2024	International GT Open	Oregon Team	2	0	0	0	0	3	30th
2025	GT World Challenge Europe Endurance Cup	Tresor Attempto Racing	4	0	0	0	0	0	NC
2025	GT World Challenge Europe Endurance Cup – Silver	Tresor Attempto Racing	4	0	0	2	1	42	8th
2025	Italian GT Championship Endurance Cup – GT3 Pro-Am	Tresor Attempto Racing	4	0	0	0	0	9	11th
2026	GT World Challenge Europe Endurance Cup	Tresor Attempto Racing	1	0	0	0	0	0	NC
2026	GT World Challenge Europe Endurance Cup – Bronze	Tresor Attempto Racing	1	0	0	0	0	0	NC
2026	Italian GT Championship Endurance Cup – GT3 Pro-Am	Tresor Attempto Racing	2	0	0	0	0	15	NC
2026	Italian GT Championship Sprint Cup – GT3 Pro-Am	Tresor Attempto Racing	4	0	0	0	3	42	NC

=== Complete Formula Renault 2.0 Alps Series results ===
(key) (Races in bold indicate pole position; races in italics indicate fastest lap)

Year	Team	1	2	3	4	5	6	7	8	9	10	11	12	13	14	Pos	Points
2013	Team Torino Motorsport	VLL; 1; 18	VLL; 2; 11	IMO1; 1; 17	IMO1; 2; 24	SPA; 1	SPA; 2	MNZ; 1	MNZ; 2	MIS; 1	MIS; 2	MUG; 1	MUG; 2	IMO2; 1	IMO2; 2	28th	0

=== Complete Formula Renault 2.0 Northern European Cup results ===
(key) (Races in bold indicate pole position) (Races in italics indicate fastest lap)

Year	Team	1	2	3	4	5	6	7	8	9	10	11	12	13	14	15	16	17	DC	Points
2013	ART Junior Team	HOC; 1	HOC; 2	HOC; 3	NÜR; 1	NÜR; 2	SIL; 1	SIL; 2	SPA; 1 Ret	SPA; 2; 12	ASS; 1; 10	ASS; 2; 13	MST; 1; 13	MST; 2; 18	MST; 3; 8	ZAN; 1; 12	ZAN; 2; 9	ZAN; 3 C	20th	73

=== Complete GT World Challenge results ===
==== GT World Challenge Europe Sprint Cup ====
Year	Team	Car	Class	1	2	3	4	5	6	7	8	9	10	11	12	13	14	Pos.	Points
2015	Grasser Racing Team	Lamborghini Huracán GT3	Silver	NOG; QR	NOG; CR	BRH; QR	BRH; CR	ZOL; QR	ZOL; CR	MSC; QR	MSC; CR	ALG; QR	ALG; CR	**MIS**; **QR**; 16	MIS; CR; DNS	ZAN; QR	ZAN; CR	8th	7
2022	Imperiale Racing	Lamborghini Huracán GT3 Evo	Pro	BRH; 1	BRH; 2	MAG; 1	MAG; 2	ZAN; 1	ZAN; 2	MIS; 1; 13	MIS; 2; 7	VAL; 1	VAL; 2					22nd	3
2023	Boutsen VDS	Audi R8 LMS Evo II	Gold	**BRH**; **1**; 9	BRH; 2; 26	MIS; 1; 6	MIS; 2 Ret	HOC; 1; 10	**HOC**; **2**; 10	VAL; 1; 29	VAL; 2; 8	ZAN; 1; 20	ZAN; 2; 17					2nd	105

==== GT World Challenge Europe Endurance Cup ====
(Races in bold indicate pole position) (Races in italics indicate fastest lap)

Year	Team	Car	Class	1	2	3	4	5	6	7	Pos.	Points
2016	Antonelli Motorsport	Lamborghini Huracán GT3	Pro-Am	MNZ	SIL	LEC; 39	SPA; 6H	SPA; 12H	SPA; 24H	NÜR	NC	0
2018	Target Racing	Lamborghini Huracán GT3	Am	MNZ	SIL	LEC	SPA; 6H; 38	SPA; 12H; 40	SPA; 24H; 30	CAT	15th	34
2019	Raton Racing by Target	Lamborghini Huracán GT3 Evo	Am	MNZ	SIL	LEC	SPA; 6H; 46	SPA; 12H; 39	SPA; 24H; 36	CAT	16th	28
2021	GRT Grasser Racing Team	Lamborghini Huracán GT3 Evo	Silver	MNZ	LEC	SPA; 6H; 46	SPA; 12H; 35	SPA; 24H; Ret	NÜR	CAT	NC	0
2022	Tresor by Car Collection	Audi R8 LMS Evo II	Silver	IMO	LEC	SPA; 6H; 21	SPA; 12H; Ret	SPA; 24H; Ret	HOC	CAT	28th	6
2023	Boutsen VDS	Audi R8 LMS Evo II	Gold	MNZ; Ret	LEC; 11	SPA; 6H; 14	SPA; 12H; 46	SPA; 24H; 42	NUR; 12	CAT; 13	4th	83
2024	Imperiale Racing	Lamborghini Huracán GT3 Evo 2	Gold	LEC	SPA; 6H	SPA; 12H	SPA; 24H	NÜR	MNZ	JED; 33	NC	0
2025	Tresor Attempto Racing	Audi R8 LMS Evo II	Silver	LEC; 23	MNZ; 13	SPA; 6H; 16	SPA; 12H; 61†	SPA; 24H; Ret	NÜR; Ret	BAR	8th	42
2026	Tresor Attempto Racing	Audi R8 LMS Evo II	Bronze	LEC; 43	MNZ	SPA; 6H	SPA; 12H	SPA; 24H	NÜR	ALG	NC	0

=== Complete GT World Challenge Asia results ===
(key) (Races in bold indicate pole position) (Races in italics indicate fastest lap)

Year	Team	Car	Class	1	2	3	4	5	6	7	8	9	10	11	12	DC	Pts
2017	FFF Racing Team by ACM	Lamborghini Huracán GT3	Silver	SEP; 1; 7	SEP; 2; 4	BUR; 1; 3	BUR; 2; 3	SUZ; 1; 6	SUZ; 2; 3	FUJ; 1; 6	FUJ; 2; 7	SHA; 1; 7	SHA; 2; 5	ZHE; 1; 2	ZHE; 2; 5	4th	131

=== Complete International GT Open results ===
(key) (Races in bold indicate pole position; results in italics indicate fastest lap)

Year	Entrant	Chassis	Class	1	2	3	4	5	6	7	8	9	10	11	12	13	14	Rank	Points
2018	Target Racing	Lamborghini Huracán GT3	Pro-Am	EST; 1	EST; 2	LEC; 1; 4	LEC; 2; 6	SPA; 1; 5	SPA; 2; 4	HUN; 1 Ret	HUN; 2 Ret	SIL; 1; 6	SIL; 2; 3					10th	21
2018	Target Racing	Lamborghini Huracán GT3	Pro											MNZ; 1 Ret	MNZ; 2 Ret	CAT; 1; 23	CAT; 2; 6	24th	12
2019	Raton Racing by Target	Lamborghini Huracán GT3 Evo	Pro-Am	LEC; 1; 8	LEC; 2; 5	HOC; 1; 7	HOC; 2; 6	SPA; 1; 6	SPA; 2; 8	RBR; 1	RBR; 2	SIL; 1	SIL; 2	CAT; 1	CAT; 2	MNZ; 1; 3	MNZ; 2; 6	13th	17
2022	Target Racing	Lamborghini Huracán GT3 Evo	Pro	EST; 1	EST; 2	LEC; 1	LEC; 2	SPA	HUN; 1	HUN; 2	RBR; 1	RBR; 2	MNZ; 1; 18†	MNZ; 2; 7	CAT; 1	CAT; 2		23rd	4
2024	Oregon Team	Lamborghini Huracán GT3 Evo 2	Pro	ALG; 1	ALG; 2	HOC; 1	HOC; 2	SPA	HUN; 1	HUN; 2	LEC; 1	LEC; 2	RBR; 1	RBR; 2	CAT; 1; 8	CAT; 2 Ret	MNZ	30th	2
