= Samin Gómez =

Venezuelan racing driver (born 1992)

- Nationality: (Venezuela) Venezuelan
- Born: Samin Gómez Briceño; 4 February 1992 (age 34) Maracay, Venezuela

GP3 Series career
- Debut season: 2013
- Current team: Campos Racing
- Categorisation: FIA Silver
- Car number: 25
- Former teams: Jenzer Motorsport
- Starts: 22
- Wins: 0
- Poles: 0
- Fastest laps: 0
- Best finish: 26th in 2013

Previous series
- 2014 2011-2012 2011 2008-2010: Auto GP; Formula Abarth; Formula Pilota China; Asian Formula Renault Challenge

Samin Gómez Briceño (born 4 February 1992) is a Venezuelan former racing driver.

== Career ==
=== Karting ===
Gómez started racing at the age of seven, racing in the Panamerican Championship, a series supported by the Commission Internationale de Karting (CIK) and the Fédération Internationale de l'Automobile (FIA). She moved to Europe for the 2007 season, taking part in the Formula Kart France series.

=== Asian Formula Renault ===
Starting in 2008, Gómez moved to single-seat open-wheel cars, making several guest appearances in the Asian Formula Renault Challenge throughout 2008 before moving onto a larger programme for the 2009 season. She contested the full 2010 season with Top Speed Racing, finishing third overall and taking three podium finishes at the Zhuhai International Circuit.

=== Formula Pilota China ===
In 2011, Gómez competed part-time in the Formula Pilota China series, replacing Robert Vișoiu at Jenzer Motorsport. Gómez finished in the points in each of the six races she contested, including a podium finish at the Sepang International Circuit.

=== Formula Abarth ===
Gómez returned to Europe in 2011, continuing her association with Jenzer Motorsport in the Italian Formula Abarth championship, as well as making several guest appearances for EuroInternational. She contested the full season in 2012, finishing seventh overall with two podium finishes.

=== GP3 Series ===
Gómez made her GP3 Series debut in 2013, driving once again for Jenzer Motorsport. She finished the season in 26th place, with her best result being 13th.

=== W Series ===
In 2019, Gómez attempted to qualify for a W Series, a women-only Formula 3 championship, but failed to progress beyond the evaluation day.

== Racing record ==
=== Career summary ===
Season	Series	Team	Races	Wins	Poles	F/Laps	Podiums	Points	Position
2008	Asian Formula Renault Challenge	March 3 Racing	2	0	0	0	0	5	27th
2009	Asian Formula Renault Challenge	March 3 Racing	4	0	0	0	0	86	9th
2009	Asian Formula Renault Challenge	Top Speed Racing	8	0	0	0	0	86	9th
2010	Asian Formula Renault Challenge	Top Speed Racing	12	0	2	3	3	194.5	**3rd**
2011	Formula Pilota China	Jenzer Welch Asia Racing	6	0	0	0	1	36	10th
2011	Formula Abarth European Championship	EuroInternational	4	0	0	0	0	11	17th
2011	Formula Abarth European Championship	Jenzer Motorsport	8	0	0	0	0	11	17th
2011	Formula Abarth Italian Championship	EuroInternational	2	0	0	0	0	8	16th
2011	Formula Abarth Italian Championship	Jenzer Motorsport	4	0	0	0	0	8	16th
2012	Formula Abarth European Series	Jenzer Motorsport	24	0	0	0	2	123	7th
2012	Formula Abarth Italian Series	Jenzer Motorsport	18	0	0	1	1	88	7th
2013	GP3 Series	Jenzer Motorsport	16	0	0	0	0	0	26th
2014	Auto GP	Zele Racing	4	0	0	0	0	2	20th
2015	GP3 Series	Campos Racing	6	0	0	0	0	0	30th

=== Complete GP3 Series results ===
(key) (Races in bold indicate pole position) (Races in italics indicate fastest lap)

Year	Entrant	1	2	3	4	5	6	7	8	9	10	11	12	13	14	15	16	17	18	D.C.	Points
2013	Jenzer Motorsport	CAT; FEA; 16	CAT; SPR; 13	VAL; FEA; Ret	VAL; SPR; 19	SIL; FEA; 20	SIL; SPR; 18	NÜR; FEA; 18	NÜR; SPR; 19	HUN; FEA; 19	HUN; SPR; 14	SPA; FEA; 16	SPA; SPR; Ret	MNZ; FEA; 17	MNZ; SPR; 15	YMC; FEA; 22	YMC; SPR; 25			26th	0
2015	Campos Racing	CAT; FEA; 20	CAT; SPR; 19	RBR; FEA; Ret	RBR; SPR; 16	SIL; FEA	SIL; SPR	HUN; FEA; 21	HUN; SPR; Ret	SPA; FEA	SPA; SPR	MNZ; FEA	MNZ; SPR	SOC; FEA	SOC; SPR	BHR; FEA	BHR; SPR	YMC; FEA	YMC; SPR	30th	0

=== Complete Auto GP results ===
(key)

Year	Entrant	1	2	3	4	5	6	7	8	9	10	11	12	13	14	15	16	Pos	Points
2014	Zele Racing	MAR; 1	MAR; 2	LEC; 1	LEC; 2	HUN; 1	HUN; 2	MNZ; 1; 9	MNZ; 2 Ret	IMO; 1 WD	IMO; 2 WD	RBR; 1	RBR; 2	NÜR; 1	NÜR; 2	EST; 1	EST; 2	20th	2
