= Yoshitaka Kuroda (racing driver) =

Japanese racing driver

- Nationality: (Japan) Japanese
- Born: 10 January 1987 (age 39) Yamagata (Japan)

Auto GP career
- Debut season: 2013
- Current team: Euronova Racing
- Car number: 15
- Former teams: Zele Racing
- Starts: 26
- Wins: 0
- Poles: 0
- Fastest laps: 0
- Best finish: 12th in 2014

Previous series
- 2012 2011 2009–10 2008 2007 2006 2005: Italian Formula Three Championship; Formula Abarth; Japanese F3 - National Class; Formula Asia 2.0; Asian Formula Renault Challenge; Formula BMW ADAC; Formula Toyota

Yoshitaka Kuroda (黒田 吉隆, Kuroda Yoshitaka; born 10 January 1987 in Japan, Yamagata) is a Japanese former racing driver. After competing in the Auto GP series with Euronova Racing, he retired from motor racing and returned to Japan to work for S Medical, a business owned by his father.

== Racing record ==
=== Complete Auto GP results ===
(key) (Races in bold indicate pole position) (Races in italics indicate fastest lap)

Year	Entrant	1	2	3	4	5	6	7	8	9	10	11	12	13	14	15	16	Pos	Points
2013	Euronova Racing	MNZ; 1; 11	MNZ; 2; 7	MAR; 1; 11	MAR; 2; 8†	HUN; 1; 12	HUN; 2 Ret	SIL; 1; 12	SIL; 2; 11	MUG; 1; 7	MUG; 2; 8	NÜR; 1; 10	NÜR; 2 Ret	DON; 1; 10	DON; 2; 9	BRN; 1; 11	BRN; 2; 11	16th	20
2014	Euronova Racing	MAR; 1 WD	MAR; 2 WD					MNZ; 1; 10	MNZ; 2; 4	IMO; 1	IMO; 2	RBR; 1	RBR; 2	NÜR; 1; 7	NÜR; 2; 7	EST; 1	EST; 2	12th	36
2014	Zele Racing			LEC; 1; 8	LEC; 2; 8	HUN; 1; 6	HUN; 2; 11											12th	36
