= Gregor Ramsay =

British racing driver (born 1996)

- Born: Gregor Scott Piggot Ramsay; 30 June 1996 (age 30) Glasgow, Scotland

Formula Renault 2.0 Eurocup career
- Debut season: 2014
- Current team: Lotus F1 Junior Team
- Car number: 24
- Former teams: Euronova Racing

Gregor Scott Piggot Ramsay (born 30 June 1996) is a British golfer and former racing driver, born in Glasgow. In 2014, he competed in Eurocup Formula Renault 2.0 with the Lotus F1 Junior Team.

== Career ==
=== Karting ===
Ramsay started karting in the Cadet class at the relatively late age of ten during the 2007 season at Larkhall, his local track. He then moved into national competition, joining the ZIP Young Guns team of karting legend Martin Hines and being coached by Terry Fullerton.

Ramsay then moved onto the international karting scene with the official Tony Kart Junior Team based out of Italy and competing in the WSK (World Series Karting) events throughout Europe. While competing in Italy he started working with the Ferrari Driver Academy. The FDA was instrumental in his acquiring an International race licence, at the age of just 15.

After two race weekends in Formula Abarth at the end of 2011, Ramsay contested the full Formula Abarth European Series in 2012. He won one race at Vallelunga, took another podium at Imola and finished eighth in the championship with Swiss team Jenzer Motorsport.

=== Formula Renault ===
For 2013 Ramsay switched to Formula Renault with the Euronova team of Vincenzo Sospiri, who is a former star of international motor racing.

The World Series by Renault granted Ramsay two wildcard entries for the Renault 2.0 Eurocup, with Manor MP Motorsport running alongside championship leader and fellow Brit, Oliver Rowland. The first being on 15/16 September 2013 at the Hungarian F1 circuit, and on the 29/30 September 2013 at Paul Ricard, France.

2013 was a learning curve year for Ramsay in Renault 2.0, and some performances led to an official top F1 Team junior programme drive in 2014.

=== Lotus F1 Junior Team ===
In 2014, Ramsay was signed to the Lotus F1 Junior Team.

== Racing record ==
=== Complete Eurocup Formula Renault 2.0 results ===
(key) (Races in bold indicate pole position; races in italics indicate fastest lap)

Year	Entrant	1	2	3	4	5	6	7	8	9	10	11	12	13	14	DC	Points
2013	Euronova	ALC; 1	ALC; 2			MSC; 1	MSC; 2	RBR; 1	RBR; 2	HUN; 1 Ret	HUN; 2; 25	LEC; 1; 25	LEC; 2; 20			NC†	0
2013	MP Motorsport			SPA; 1; 17	SPA; 2 Ret									CAT; 1; 20	CAT; 2; 25	NC†	0
2014	KTR	ALC; 1; 17	ALC; 2; 21	SPA; 1; 22	SPA; 2; 32	MSC; 1; 24	MSC; 2; 21	NÜR; 1; 16	NÜR; 2; 20	HUN; 1; 15	HUN; 2; 17	LEC; 1 Ret	LEC; 2; 14	JER; 1; 14	JER; 2; 18	24th	0

† As Ramsay was a guest driver, he was ineligible for points

=== Complete Formula Renault 2.0 Alps Series results ===
(key) (Races in bold indicate pole position; races in italics indicate fastest lap)

Year	Team	1	2	3	4	5	6	7	8	9	10	11	12	13	14	Pos	Points
2013	Euronova Racing	VLL; 1; 7	VLL; 2; 24	IMO1; 1; 12	IMO1; 2; 13	SPA; 1 Ret	SPA; 2 Ret	MNZ; 1 Ret	MNZ; 2; 5	MIS; 1; 9	MIS; 2; 13	MUG; 1; 12	MUG; 2; 14	IMO2; 1; 12	IMO2; 2; 10	19th	19

=== Complete Formula Renault 2.0 NEC results ===
(key) (Races in bold indicate pole position) (Races in italics indicate fastest lap)

Year	Entrant	1	2	3	4	5	6	7	8	9	10	11	12	13	14	15	16	17	DC	Points
2014	KTR	MNZ; 1; 10	MNZ; 2; 8	SIL; 1	SIL; 2	HOC; 1	HOC; 2	HOC; 3	SPA; 1	SPA; 2	ASS; 1; 15	ASS; 2; 15	MST; 1; 14	MST; 2; 24	MST; 3 C	NÜR; 1	NÜR; 2	NÜR; 3	24th	43
