= Nicolas Costa =

Brazilian racing driver (born 1991)

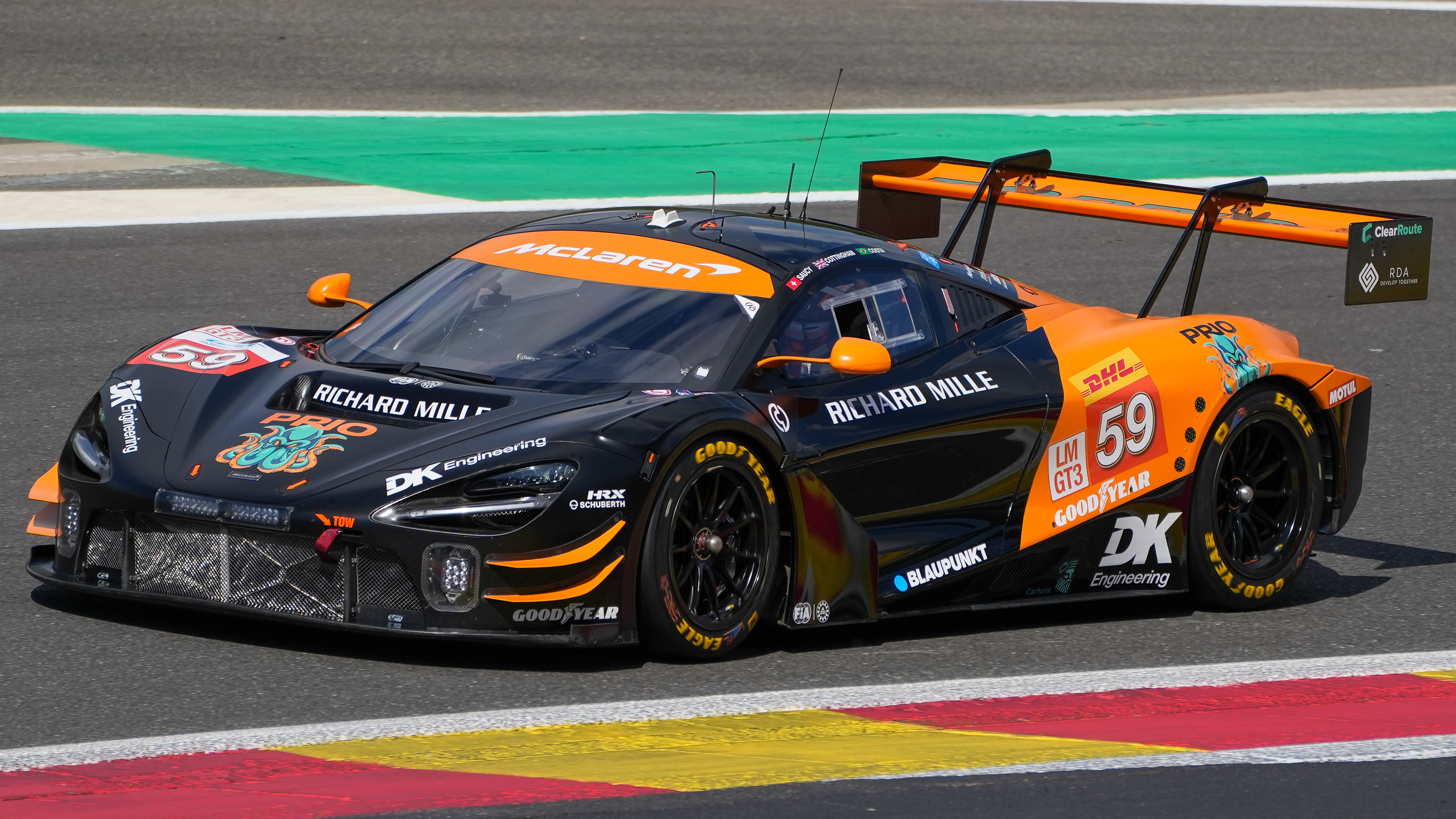
- Nationality: (Brazil) Brazilian
- Born: Nicolas Leite Rebelo Costa; 14 November 1991 (age 34) Rio de Janeiro, Brazil

FIA World Endurance Championship career
- Debut season: 2024
- Current team: United Autosports
- Categorisation: FIA Silver
- Car number: 59
- Starts: 0
- Wins: 0
- Podiums: 0
- Poles: 0
- Fastest laps: 0
- Best finish: TBA in 2024

Previous series
- 2023 2019 2018 2017 2016 2015 2013–14 2011–12: Porsche Carrera Cup Brasil; Super Taikyū - ST-X; International GT Open; Blancpain GT Series Asia; Italian GT Championship; F4 Japanese Championship; Pro Mazda Championship; Formula Abarth

Championship titles
- 2023 2016 2012 2010: Porsche Carrera Cup Brasil; Italian GT Championship - SuperGTCup; Formula Abarth European Series; Formula Abarth Italian Series; Formula Future Fiat

Nicolas Leite Rebelo Costa (born 14 November 1991) is a Brazilian racing driver who currently competes in the NASCAR Brasil Series, driving the No. 6 Chevrolet Camaro for AMattheis Vogel. He previously competed in the FIA World Endurance Championship for United Autosports, and was champion of the Porsche Carrera Cup Brasil in 2023.

== Career ==
=== Early career ===
Costa began his motorsport career in karting in 2002 at the age of ten, racing in various championships in Brazil. He would go on to rack up fifteen championships over the course of seven years, and finish runner-up to Leonardo Cordeiro in the national Petrobras Karting Championship in 2008. After receiving a scholarship from the Skip Barber Racing School in the United States, Costa made his formula racing debut in 2009, making a one-off appearance in the MSA Formula Ford Championship in the United Kingdom. He would contest his first full season of car racing the following year in Felipe Massa's new Formula Future Fiat series; his subsequent championship victory earned him admission into the Ferrari Driver Academy, making him the first South American to become an academy member.

After gaining the support of Ferrari, Costa moved to the European single-seater ladder for 2011, competing in the European and Italian Formula Abarth series for Cram Competition. He would go on to finish ninth and fifth respectively in the two championships and was ultimately dropped from Ferrari's roster at the end of the year. However, he would remain in Formula Abarth for the 2012 season, moving to Vincenzo Sospiri's Euronova Racing team, operated by Fortec Motorsport. His second-year campaign would prove far more successful, as he went on to win both the European and Italian championship titles over Luca Ghiotto. Costa also participated in the GP3 Series' annual post-season test twice, driving for Carlin in 2011 and Marussia Manor Racing in 2012, but ultimately did not secure a race seat.

Costa moved to the United States' Road to Indy in 2013, competing on a part-time basis in the Pro Mazda Championship; after claiming four podiums in a part-time campaign with Team Pelfrey, he joined Dallas-based M1 Racing for the following season on a round-by-round basis. After initial struggles in the first three rounds, a return to Team Pelfrey for the remainder of the season yielded better results, with a pair of pole positions and a race win at Mid-Ohio, plus three other second-place finishes, being enough for Costa to end the season fifth in the standings.

Costa made his surprise debut in the F4 Japanese Championship in 2015, rejoining Vincenzo Sospiri Racing (VSR)'s Zap Speed-operated team alongside Takuro Shinohara as a junior driver for Lamborghini Squadra Corse. Despite a promising fourth-place finish in the season's opening round at Okayama, Costa failed to score points for the remainder of his campaign and was replaced by fellow Brazilian Gustavo Myasava before the fifth round at Sugo. However, he would retain his connections to the team, taking part in a test in a Lamborghini Huracán Super Trofeo alongside Shinohara at Adria International Raceway in October 2015.

=== Sports car racing career ===
Between 2016 and 2018, Costa raced for Vincenzo Sospiri Racing and Lamborghini in various GT series, partnering fellow VSR protégés Yūki Nemoto and Ling Kang for campaigns in the Italian GT Championship, Lamborghini Super Trofeo series, and the International GT Open championship. He would claim the GTCup class championship in Italian GT in 2016, and claim a second-place finish in a one-off appearance in the 2017 Blancpain GT Series Asia at Suzuka, driving alongside Sandy Stuvik. Costa returned to Japan to contest the Super Taikyū endurance racing series in 2019, driving a B-Max-operated Nissan GT-R GT3 for Tairoku Racing, and would finish on the podium at the Fuji 24 Hours with team owners Tairoku Yamaguchi and Shinichi Takagi, Satoshi Motoyama, and Harrison Newey before the team's withdrawal from the championship. He spent 2020 as a driver coach in Super Taikyū.

Costa returned to his native Brazil in 2021, spending the next three seasons competing in Porsche 911-based one-make championships. After competing part-time in the Porsche Endurance Challenge Brasil for two seasons, Costa moved to the Porsche Carrera Cup Brasil for 2023. After winning the season's first round at Interlagos from pole position, becoming the series' first debut race winner since 2018, Costa went on to win another six races and claim the championship title by 28 points over four-time series champion Miguel Paludo.

=== FIA World Endurance Championship ===
In February 2024, Costa was announced to be returning to the international stage, piloting a McLaren 720S GT3 Evo for United Autosports in the FIA World Endurance Championship alongside Grégoire Saucy and James Cottingham.

== Racing record ==
=== Career summary ===
Season	Series	Team	Races	Wins	Poles	F/Laps	Podiums	Points	Position
2009	British Formula Ford Championship	Aquila Racing	1	0	0	0	0	0	NC†
2010	Formula Future Fiat	N/A	12	2	3	5	5	116	**1st**
2010	Skip Barber National Championship	Skip Barber Racing School	4	0	1	0	1	101	13th
2011	Formula Abarth European Series	Cram Competition	12	0	0	0	0	52	9th
2011	Formula Abarth Italian Series	Cram Competition	14	0	0	0	1	84	5th
2012	Formula Abarth European Series	Euronova Racing by Fortec	24	6	3	9	15	266	**1st**
2012	Formula Abarth Italian Series	Euronova Racing by Fortec	18	4	2	6	12	194	**1st**
2012	Fórmula 3 Sudamericana	Hitech Racing	4	1	1	2	2	35	8th
2013	Pro Mazda Championship	Team Pelfrey	8	0	0	0	4	N/A†	NC†
2014	Pro Mazda Championship	M1 Racing	6	0	0	0	0	224	5th
2014	Pro Mazda Championship	Team Pelfrey	8	1	2	1	4	224	5th
2015	F4 Japanese Championship	VSR Lamborghini S.C. Formula Jr.	8	0	0	0	0	10	18th
2015	Stock Car Brasil	Bardahl Hot Car	1	0	0	0	0	N/A†	NC†
2016	Italian GT Championship - GTCup	Vincenzo Sospiri Racing	12	6	4	3	9	186	**1st**
2016	Lamborghini Super Trofeo Europe - Pro-Am	Vincenzo Sospiri Racing	2	0	0	0	1	22	13th
2017	Blancpain GT Series Asia - GT3	Vincenzo Sospiri Racing	2	0	0	0	1	22	21st
2017	Blancpain GT Series Asia - Silver	Vincenzo Sospiri Racing	2	1	0	0	1	35	10th
2017	Lamborghini Super Trofeo Europe - Pro	VS Racing	2	0	0	0	1		
2017	Lamborghini Super Trofeo Asia - Pro	X-One Racing Team	2	0	0	0	0	11	15th
2018	International GT Open - Pro	Vincenzo Sospiri Racing	6	0	0	0	0	22	18th
2019	Super Taikyū - ST-X	TAIROKU Racing	3	0	0	0	1	40‡	7th‡
2021	Porsche Endurance Challenge Brasil - GT3 Cup	Dener Motorsport	3	0	0	0	0	90	19th
2021	Porsche Endurance Challenge Brasil - GT3 Sport	Dener Motorsport	3	1			1	100	11th
2022	Porsche Endurance Challenge Brasil - Carrera Cup	Dener Motorsport	3	0	0	0	1		
2023	Porsche Carrera Cup Brasil	Porsche AG	12	7	4	1	11	223	**1st**
2023	Império Endurance Brasil - P1	Power Imports	1	0	0	0	0	N/A†	NC†
2024	FIA World Endurance Championship - LMGT3	United Autosports	8	0	0	0	0	52	9th
2024	TCR South America Touring Car Championship	Cobra Racing Team	1	0	0	0	0	27	35th
2024	TCR Brazil Touring Car Championship	Cobra Racing Team	1	0	0	0	0	27	19th
2025	Porsche Endurance Challenge Brasil - Carrera	Dener Motorsport							
2025	Porsche Carrera Cup Brasil	Dener Motorsport							
2025	Turismo Nacional BR - Endurance	Bagua Racing							
2026	NASCAR Brasil Series	AMattheis Vogel							
2026	Porsche Carrera Cup Brasil								
2026	1000 Miles of São Paulo - GT	Grid Racing Team	1	0	1	1	1	N/A	**2nd**

^{†} As Costa was a guest driver, he was ineligible to score points.
‡ Team standings. * Season still in progress.

=== Complete Stock Car Brasil results ===
Year	Team	Car	1	2	3	4	5	6	7	8	9	10	11	12	13	14	15	16	17	18	19	20	21	Rank	Points
2015	Bardahl Hot Car	Chevrolet Sonic	GOI; 1; 22	RBP; 1	RBP; 2	VEL; 1	VEL; 2	CUR; 1	CUR; 2	SCZ; 1	SCZ; 2	CUR; 1	CUR; 2	GOI; 1	CAS; 1	CAS; 2	BRA; 1	BRA; 2	CUR; 1	CUR; 2	TAR; 1	TAR; 2	INT; 1	NC^{†}	–

^{†} As Costa was a guest driver, he was ineligible to score points.

=== Complete Porsche Carrera Cup Brasil results ===
(key) (Races in bold indicate pole position) (Races in italics indicate fastest lap)

Year	Team	1	2	3	4	5	6	7	8	9	10	11	12	Pos.	Points
2023	Porsche AG	**SÃO**; **1**; 1	SÃO; 2; 3	**SÃO2**; **1**; 3	SÃO2; 2 Ret	**GOI**; **1**; 1	GOI; 2; 4	SÃO; 1; 1	SÃO; 2; 3	ARG; 1; 1	**ARG**; **2**; 1	SÃO; 1; 1	SÃO; 2; 1	1st	259

=== Complete FIA World Endurance Championship results ===
(key) (Races in bold indicate pole position) (Races in italics indicate fastest lap)

Year	Entrant	Class	Car	Engine	1	2	3	4	5	6	7	8	Rank	Points
2024	United Autosports	LMGT3	McLaren 720S GT3 Evo	McLaren M840T 4.0 L Turbo V8	QAT; 14	IMO; 11	SPA; 4	LMS; Ret	SÃO; 4	COA; 4	FUJ; 8	BHR; 6	9th	52

^{*} Season still in progress.

=== Complete 24 Hours of Le Mans results ===
Year	Team	Co-Drivers	Car	Class	Laps	Pos.	Class Pos.
2024	(United Kingdom) United Autosports	(United Kingdom) James Cottingham (Switzerland) Grégoire Saucy	McLaren 720S GT3 Evo	LMGT3	220	DNF	DNF

=== American open-wheel racing results ===
==== Pro Mazda Championship ====
Year	Team	1	2	3	4	5	6	7	8	9	10	11	12	13	14	15	16	Rank	Points
2013	Team Pelfrey	AUS	AUS	STP	STP	IND	IOW	TOR; 3	TOR; 6	MOS; 5	MOS; 10	MOH; 15	MOH; 3	TRO	TRO	HOU; 3	HOU; 2	NC†	0†
2014	M1 Racing	STP; 8	STP; 16	BAR; 19	BAR; 8	IMS; 15	IMS; 16											5th	224
2014	Team Pelfrey							LOR; 4	HOU; 2	HOU; 5	**MOH**; 1	**MOH**; 2	MIL; 5	SON; 4	SON; 2			5th	224

^{†} As Costa was a guest driver, he was ineligible to score points.
