= Emanuele Zonzini =

Sammarinese racing driver

- Nationality: Sammarinese
- Born: 17 February 1994 (age 32) San Marino

GP3 Series career
- Debut season: 2013
- Current team: Trident Racing
- Categorisation: FIA Silver
- Car number: 25
- Starts: 0
- Wins: 0
- Poles: 0
- Fastest laps: 0

Previous series
- 2011-2012 2012: Formula Abarth; Formula Renault 2.0 Alps

Emanuele Zonzini (born 17 February 1994) is a racing driver from San Marino currently competing in the Lamborghini Super Trofeo Europe with Iron Lynx. He competed in the 2013 GP3 Series with Trident Racing, finishing 25th in the standings.

== Racing record ==
=== Career summary ===
Season	Series	Team	Races	Wins	Poles	F/Laps	Podiums	Points	Position
2011	Formula Abarth Italian Series	Euronova Racing by Fortec	14	0	0	0	0	34	12th
2011	Formula Abarth European Series	Euronova Racing by Fortec	10	0	0	0	1	23	13th
2012	Formula Abarth Italian Series	Euronova Racing by Fortec	24	1	0	0	8	200	5th
2012	Formula Abarth European Series	Euronova Racing by Fortec	18	1	0	1	7	160	**3rd**
2012	Formula Renault 2.0 Alps	AV Formula	4	0	0	0	0	0	30th
2013	GP3 Series	Trident Racing	16	0	0	0	0	0	25th
2014	EuroV8 Series	Audi Sport Italia	3	0	0	0	1	28	15th
2014	Italian GT Championship	Audi Sport Italia	14	1	1	0	2	69	14th
2015	Italian GT Championship	Audi Sport Italia	14	0	1	0	4	93	13th
2016	ADAC GT Masters	Bonaldi Motorsport	14	0	0	0	0	1	53rd
2018	Lamborghini Super Trofeo Europe - Pro-Am	Iron Lynx Motorsport Lab	11	2	1	0	8	87	**2nd**
2019	Italian GT Championship	Imperiale Racing	3	0	0	0	2	?	?
2022	Lamborghini Super Trofeo Europe - Pro-Am	VS Racing	12	1	2	0	4	82	6th
2023	Lamborghini Super Trofeo Europe - Pro-Am	Iron Lynx							
2025	Italian GT Championship Endurance Cup - GT3	Imperiale Racing	3	0	0	0	0	1	22nd
2026	Italian GT Championship Sprint Cup - GT3	AKM Motorsport	7	0	0	0	0	0	NC

=== Complete Formula Renault 2.0 Alps Series results ===
(key) (Races in bold indicate pole position; races in italics indicate fastest lap)

Year	Team	1	2	3	4	5	6	7	8	9	10	11	12	13	14	Pos	Points
2012	AV Formula	MNZ; 1	MNZ; 2	PAU; 1	PAU; 2	IMO; 1	IMO; 2	SPA; 1	SPA; 2	RBR; 1	RBR; 2	MUG; 1; 19	MUG; 2; 17	CAT; 1; 26	CAT; 2; 13	30th	0

=== Complete GP3 Series results ===
(key) (Races in bold indicate pole position) (Races in italics indicate fastest lap)

Year	Entrant	1	2	3	4	5	6	7	8	9	10	11	12	13	14	15	16	D.C.	Points
2013	Trident Racing	CAT; FEA; 17	CAT; SPR; Ret	VAL; FEA; 16	VAL; SPR; 14	SIL; FEA; 19	SIL; SPR; Ret	NÜR; FEA; 15	NÜR; SPR; 12	HUN; FEA; Ret	HUN; SPR; Ret	SPA; FEA; Ret	SPA; SPR; 23	MNZ; FEA; 14	MNZ; SPR; 14	YMC; FEA; 14	YMC; SPR; 14	25th	0
