= Formula Abarth =

Open-wheel racing series

- Category: Single seaters
- Country: Europe
- Inaugural season: 2010
- Folded: 2013
- Drivers: 33 (2011)
- Teams: 16 (2011)
- Constructors: Tatuus
- Engine suppliers: FPT
- Tyre suppliers: Kumho
- Last Drivers' champion: (Italy) Alessio Rovera
- Last Teams' champion: (Italy) Cram Motorsport
- Official website: Formula Abarth

Formula Abarth was an open wheel racing series based in Italy and Europe aimed at karting graduates. The inaugural season was in 2010, effectively replacing the Formula Azzurra.

Abarth has taken over the supporting Project Youth initiative, starting in 2005.

After the success of 2010 season, in which competed international drivers and teams, a new European series has been created with a prize offered in collaboration with Ferrari Driver Academy.

Following a restructure of the FIA single-seater ladder, Formula Abarth was renamed the Italian Formula 4 Championship, retaining the Abarth engines.

== Championships ==
- Formula Abarth rewards titles with different classifications according to the following championships:

Region	Championship Name	Description
Europe	Formula Abarth European Series	For drivers between 15 and 21 years old who have not already competed in any national and international F.3 championship or higher series †
Europe	Formula Abarth European Series for TEAM	For Teams holding a valid licence for the current season, whose drivers compete in the Formula Abarth European Series for drivers: Only the best placed driver awards points to the team, final ranking is drawn by summing up all the scores
Italy	Formula ACI/CSAI Abarth Italian Championship	For drivers between 15 and 19 years old who have not already competed in any national and international F.3 championship or higher series †
Italy	Formula ACI/CSAI Abarth National Trophy	For drivers between 20 and 23 years old who have not already competed in any national and international F.3 championship or higher series †
Italy	Formula ACI/CSAI Abarth National Trophy for TEAM	For Teams holding a valid licence for the current season, whose drivers compete in the Italian Championship: Only the best placed driver awards points to the team, final ranking is drawn by summing up all the scores

† The series promoter reserves the right to evaluate single applications

== Race weekend ==
Free practice sessions will be conducted on specific dates during weeks preceding the race.

The qualifying session lasts 30 minutes in a unique or multiple turn and decides the grid order for the first race which has a duration of 28 minutes + 1 lap.

The second race lasts 28 minutes + 1 lap and the grid is decided by the qualifying session with top 8 being reversed, so the driver who started 8th on 1st race will start from pole position and the pole sitter will start from 8th place.

== Scoring system ==
- Pole for first and third race: 1 point (not for National Trophy drivers)

Race	Position									
Race	1st	2nd	3rd	4th	5th	6th	7th	8th	9th	10th
Feature races	20	15	12	10	8	5	4	3	2	1
Sprint	13	11	9	7	6	5	4	3	2	1

- Fastest lap: 1 point in each race (not for National Trophy drivers)

== Results ==
Season	Champion	Second	Third	Team Champion	Secondary Class Champion
2010	Brandon Maïsano	Patric Niederhauser	Raffaele Marciello	Prema Junior	N: Simone Iaquinta
2011	I: Patric Niederhauser	Sergey Sirotkin	Michael Heche	Jenzer Motorsport	N: Yoshitaka Kuroda
2011	E: Sergey Sirotkin	Patric Niederhauser	Michael Heche	Jenzer Motorsport	R: Gerard Barrabeig
2012	I: Nicolas Costa	Luca Ghiotto	Bruno Bonifacio	Euronova Racing by Fortec	not held
2012	E: Nicolas Costa	Luca Ghiotto	Emanuele Zonzini	Euronova Racing by Fortec	R: Santiago Urrutia
2013	Alessio Rovera	Michele Beretta	Simone Iaquinta	Cram Motorsport	N: Sergey Trofimov; R: Alessio Rovera

== See also ==
- Formula Renault
- Abarth
- Formula Pilota China
- Panam GP Series
