= Vincenzo Sospiri Racing =

(Italy) Vincenzo Sospiri Racing
- Founded: 2001 as Fortec Italia Motorsport; 2002 as Euronova Racing
- Base: Forlì, Italy
- Team principal(s): Vincenzo Sospiri
- Current series: Lamborghini Super Trofeo Europe; Italian GT Championship; GT World Challenge Europe Endurance Cup
- Former series: Eurocup Formula Renault 2.0; Formula Renault 2.0 Italia; International Formula Master; Italian Formula Three Championship; Formula Abarth; Formula Renault 2.0 Alps; Auto GP; Italian F4 Championship; F4 Japanese Championship; Asian Le Mans Series; International GT Open; GT Cup Open Europe; Blancpain GT Series Asia
- Current drivers: (Mexico) Luis Michael Dörrbecker (Belgium) Baptiste Moulin (Norway) Marcus Påverud (Italy) Mattia Michelotto (Italy) Michele Beretta (Chile) Benjamín Hites (Japan) Yuki Nemoto (Poland) Karol Basz (Italy) Edoardo Liberati (Italy) Andrea Cola (Switzerland) Jean-Luc D'Auria (France) Stephane Tribaudini (San Marino) Emanuel Colombini (San Marino) Emanuele Zonzini
- Teams' Championships: Formula Abarth; 2012; European Formula Abarth; 2012; GT Cup Open Europe; 2019
- Drivers' Championships: European Formula Abarth; 2011: Sergey Sirotkin; 2012: Nicolas Costa; Formula Abarth; 2012: Nicolas Costa; Auto GP; 2014: Kimiya Sato; Italian GT Championship; 2016: Nicolas Costa; 2017: Tuomas Tujula & Aaro Vainio; Lamborghini Super Trofeo Europe; 2017 ProAm: Christopher Dreyspring & JiaTong Liang; 2017 Am Cup: Andrzej Lewandowski & Teodor Myszkowski; 2018 Am Cup: Andrzej Lewandowski; 2020 ProAm Cup: Andrzej Lewandowski & Karol Basz; International GT Open; 2018 AM: Giulio Borlenghi & Andrzej Lewandowski; 2019 GT3 ProAm : Frederik Scandorff; GT Cup Open Europe; 2019: Hans-Peter Koller
- Website: https://www.vs-racing.com/

Vincenzo Sospiri Racing Srl (also known as Fortec Italia Motorsport, Euronova Racing, VS Racing) is an auto racing team based in Italy.

== History ==
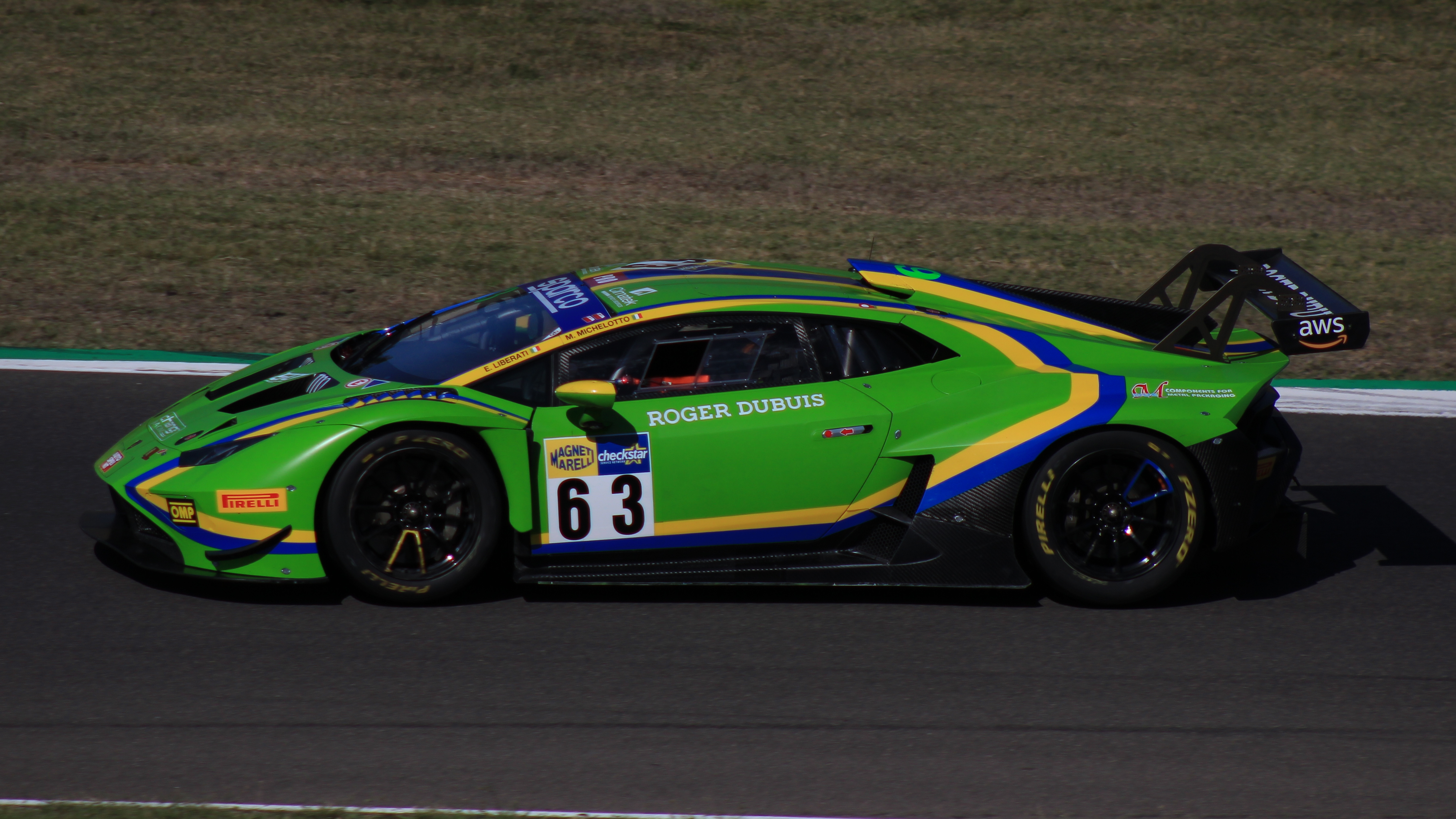
The car raced by Edoardo Liberati and Mattia Michelotto in 2023 at Monza.

After retiring from racing, Vincenzo Sospiri decided to collaborate with Fortec Motorsport and Italian investors to create in 2001 Euro Formula 3000 team with Michael Bentwood and Polo Villaamil as racing drivers. In 2002, Sospiri joined forces with David Sears and the team was renamed to Euronova Racing. Euronova entered in Formula Abarth in 2011. The team wanted to return their initial name in 2014, but remained as Euronova.

== Former Series Results ==
=== F4 Japanese Championship ===
Year	Car	Drivers	Races	Wins	Poles	F/Laps	Podiums	Points	D.C.	T.C.
2015	Dome F110	(Japan) Takuro Shinohara	14	0	0	0	0	35	11th	7th
2015	Dome F110	(Brazil) Nicolas Costa	7	0	0	0	0	10	18th	7th
2015	Dome F110	(Brazil) Gustavo Myasava	6	0	0	0	0	0	39th	7th
2016	Dome F110	(Japan) Rikiya Kanazawa	3	0	0	0	0	0	29th	NC
2016	Dome F110	(South Korea) Do Yun Hwang	14	0	0	0	0	0	34th	NC
2017	Dome F110	(Japan) Rikiya Kanazawa	14	0	0	0	0	0	22nd	NC
2017	Dome F110	(India) Akash Gowda	12	0	0	0	0	0	24th	NC

=== Italian F4 Championship ===
Year	Car	Drivers	Races	Wins	Poles	F/Laps	Podiums	Points	D.C.	T.C.
2014	Tatuus F4-T014	(Italy) Leonardo Pulcini	21	0	0	0	6	187‡	4th‡	2nd
2014	Tatuus F4-T014	(Italy) Andrea Fontana	18	1	0	1	3	116	6th	2nd
2014	Tatuus F4-T014	(Japan) Ukyo Sasahara	3	1	0	0	1	25	17th	2nd
2014	Tatuus F4-T014	(Japan) Shinji Sawada	3	0	0	0	0	2	22nd	2nd
2014	Tatuus F4-T014	(United Kingdom) Sennan Fielding	6	1	0	0	3	69†	4th†	2nd
2014	Tatuus F4-T014	(Russia) Ivan Matveev	21	0	0	0	1	76	9th	7th
2015	Tatuus F4-T014	(Japan) Marino Sato	21	0	0	1	1	62	10th	5th
2015	Tatuus F4-T014	(Venezuela) Mauricio Baíz	21	0	0	1	1	48	12th	5th
2015	Tatuus F4-T014	(Italy) Simone Cunati	3	0	0	0	1	18	19th	5th
2016	Tatuus F4-T014	(Italy) Simone Cunati	18	0	0	1	3	95	7th	6th
2016	Tatuus F4-T014	(Japan) Marino Sato	21	1	0	0	1	42	18th	6th
2016	Tatuus F4-T014	(United States) Jaden Conwright	20	0	0	0	0	2	30th	6th

† Italian F4 Trophy ‡ Shared results with other teams

== Timeline ==
Current series
Lamborghini Super Trofeo Europe	2015–present
Italian GT Championship	2016-2017; 2019–present
GT World Challenge Europe Endurance Cup	2021–present
Former series
Auto GP	2001-2006, 2010, 2012-2014
Italian Formula Renault Championship	2002-2006
Eurocup Formula Renault 2.0	2003-2006; 2013
International Formula Master	2005; 2007-2008
Formula Abarth	2011-2013
Italian Formula Three Championship	2012
Formula Renault 2.0 Alps Series	2013
Formula Renault 2.0 Northern European Cup	2014
Italian F4 Championship	2014-2016
F4 Japanese Championship	2015-2017
Asian Le Mans Series	2016-2017
GT World Challenge Asia	2017, 2019, 2024
International GT Open	2018-2019, 2021
GT Cup Open Europe	2019
