= Daan Arrow =

Dutch and Polish racing driver (born 2003)

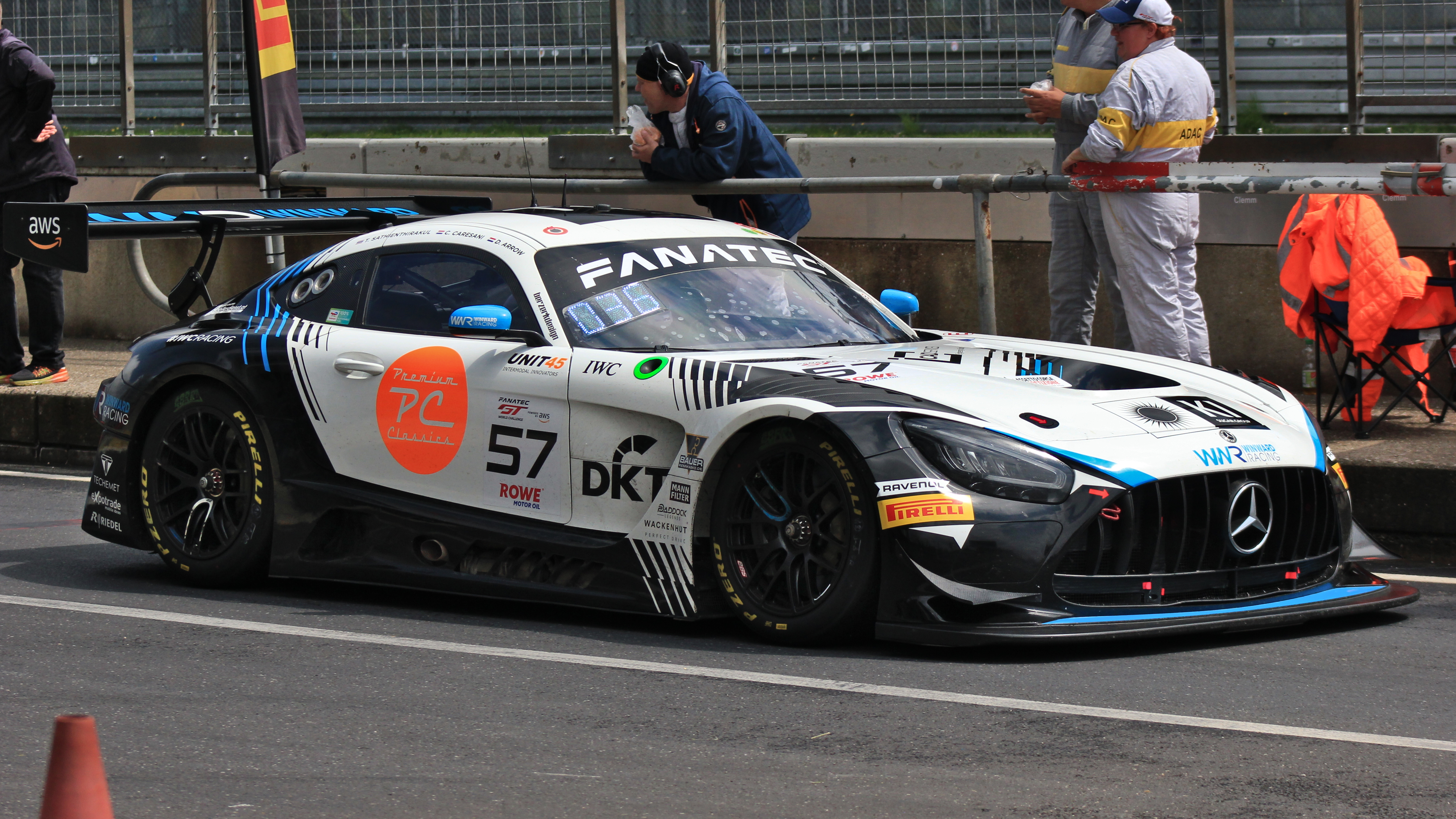
- Pijl in 2024
- Nationality: (Netherlands) Dutch (Poland) Polish
- Born: Daan Pijl; 26 July 2003 (age 23) Amsterdam, Netherlands
- Categorisation: FIA Silver

Championship titles
- 2024 2019: GT World Challenge Europe Endurance Cup - Silver; Ford Fiesta Sprint Cup

Daan Pijl (born 26 July 2003), known professionally as Daan Arrow, is a Dutch and Polish racing driver who last competed for Winward Racing in the GS class of the Michelin Pilot Challenge.

== Career ==
Arrow made his car racing debut in 2017 by racing in the Dutch Racing Driver series, before moving to Ford Fiesta Sprint Cup for the next two years. After finishing fourth in the standings in his rookie year, Arrow scored six wins and four more podiums to clinch the title in his sophomore season.

In early 2020, Arrow joined MDM Motorsport to race in GT4 European Series alongside Simon Knap, but neither he nor the team competed in any races due to travel restrictions. Following a one-off appearance in Mazda MX-5 Cup Netherlands, Arrow returned to full-time competition in 2021, driving for Team Bleekemolen in the VRM BMW M2 Cup and for Bonaldi Motorsport in Lamborghini Super Trofeo Europe. In the former, Arrow scored one win at Zolder and finished fourth in points, whereas in the latter, Arrow was eighth in the Pro standings with a lone win at Spa.

Stepping up to GT3 competition in 2022, Arrow joined Imperiale Racing to compete in the Italian GT Endurance Championship alongside Mateo Llarena and Raúl Guzmán. After finishing fourth at Pergusa, Arrow finished third in the remaining three races of the season to secure fifth in the GT3 points. During 2022, Arrow also made his GT World Challenge Europe Sprint Cup debut for GSM Novamarine at Misano.

In 2023, Arrow joined Oregon Team for his maiden season in International GT Open alongside Pietro Perolini, and began racing under the name "Daan Arrow", the English translation of his last name. In the seven round season, the pair scored one points finish, an eighth place in race two at Monza, to end the year 33rd in points. During 2023, Arrow also raced in Lamborghini Super Trofeo Europe for Bonaldi Motorsport alongside Abbie Eaton, taking a lone podium at the Nürburgring on their way to seventh in the Pro standings.

The following year, Arrow made his GT World Challenge Europe Endurance Cup debut for Winward Racing alongside Colin Caresani and Tanart Sathienthirakul. The trio finished on the podium in every race they contested, which included class wins at Le Castellet and Monza, en route to the Silver Cup title with a race to spare. During 2024, Arrow also competed for Goodspeed Racing Team in select races in both GT Winter Series and International GT Open.

Arrow mainly raced in Asia in 2025, competing for Vollgas Motorsports in all but the first and last rounds of GT World Challenge Asia alongside Han Min-Kwan. In the four rounds he contested, Arrow scored Silver-Am podiums at Mandalika and Okayama to end the year ninth in the class standings. During 2025, Arrow also competed in the Nürburgring Langstrecken-Serie and the 24 Hours of Nürburgring for Black Falcon in the SP9 Pro-Am class, along with an appearance at the 24 Hours of Spa with Winward Racing.

After competing with them in the last three races of the GS class of the 2025 Michelin Pilot Challenge, Arrow returned to Winward Racing for his first full season in the series in 2026. In his rookie season in the series, Arrow took podiums at Daytona and Sebring to end the year 13th in the GS standings despite missing a race. During 2026, Arrow also raced at the 24 Hours of Spa for Winward, as well as competing for Porsche-fielding RS1 at the Indianapolis 8 Hour.

== Racing record ==
=== Racing career summary ===
Season	Series	Team	Races	Wins	Poles	F/Laps	Podiums	Points	Position
2018	Ford Fiesta Sprint Cup	Privateer	12	0	1	1	5	148	4th
2019	Ford Fiesta Sprint Cup	Privateer	12	6	2	2	10	222	**1st**
2020	Mazda MX-5 Cup Netherlands		3	0	0	1	1	39	12th
2021	VRM BMW M2 Cup	Team Bleekemolen	10	1	0	0	2	111.5	4th
2021	Mazda MX-5 Cup Netherlands		2	0	0	0	0	30	14th
2021	Lamborghini Super Trofeo Europe – Pro	Bonaldi Motorsport	10	1	0	0	1	53	8th
2021	Italian GT Sprint Championship – GT Cup	Bonaldi Motorsport	2	1	0	0	1	24	NC
2021	GT Cup Open Europe – GT Cup Pro-Am	Alda Motorsport; Bonaldi Motorsport	3	0	0	0	2	14	10th
2022	Italian GT Endurance Championship – GT3	Imperiale Racing	4	0	0	0	3	36	5th
2022	Nürburgring Langstrecken-Serie – BMW M240i	Adrenalin Motorsport Team Alzner Automotive	2	0	0	0	0	0	NC
2022	GT World Challenge Europe Sprint Cup	GSM Novamarine	2	0	0	0	0	0	NC
2022	GT World Challenge Europe Sprint Cup – Silver	GSM Novamarine	2	0	0	0	0	3	17th
2023	Lamborghini Super Trofeo Europe – Pro	Rebelleo by Bonaldi Motorsport	12	0	1	0	1	49	7th
2023	Lamborghini Super Trofeo World Final – Pro	Rebelleo by Bonaldi Motorsport	2	0	0	0	0	2	11th
2023	International GT Open	Oregon Team	13	0	0	0	0	3	33rd
2024	GT Winter Series – GT3	Good Speed Racing	6	1	0	0	2	20.955	8th
2024	International GT Open – Pro-Am	Good Speed Racing	6	0	0	0	0	0	33rd
2024	GT World Challenge Europe Endurance Cup	Winward Racing	4	0	0	0	0	2	30th
2024	GT World Challenge Europe Endurance Cup - Silver	Winward Racing	4	2	1	2	4	102	**1st**
2024	Intercontinental GT Challenge	Winward Racing	1	0	0	0	0	0	NC
2025	Nürburgring Langstrecken-Serie – SP9 Pro-Am	Black Falcon Team EAE	5	2	0	0	2	0	NC
2025	24 Hours of Nürburgring – SP9 Pro-Am	Black Falcon Team EAE	1	0	0	0	0	—N/a	7th
2025	GT World Challenge Asia – Silver-Am	Vollgas Motorsports	8	0	2	0	2	84	9th
2025	GT World Challenge Europe Endurance Cup	Winward Racing	1	0	0	0	0	0	NC
2025	GT World Challenge Europe Endurance Cup - Bronze	Winward Racing	1	0	0	0	1	27	14th
2025	Michelin Pilot Challenge - GS	Winward Racing	3	0	0	0	0	540	38th
2025	Gulf 12 Hours	Winward Racing	1	0	0	0	0	—N/a	DNF
2025	GT World Challenge America – Pro-Am	Regulator Racing	1	0	0	0	0	0	NC
2025	Intercontinental GT Challenge	Black Falcon Team EAE; Winward Racing; Vollgas Motorsports; Regulator Racing	4	0	0	0	0	8	27th
2025–26	24H Series Middle East - GT3	Winward Racing	2	0	0	0	1	48	8th
2026	Michelin Pilot Challenge – GS	Winward Racing	9	0	0	0	2	1720	13th
2026	Nürburgring Langstrecken-Serie – SP9 Am	Black Falcon Team EAE	3	3	0	0	3	27	NC
2026	Nürburgring Langstrecken-Serie – SP9 Pro-Am	48LOSCH Motorsport by Black Falcon	1	0	0	0	0	0	NC
2026	24 Hours of Nürburgring – SP9 Pro-Am	48LOSCH Motorsport by Black Falcon	1	1	0	0	1	—N/a	**1st**
2026	Intercontinental GT Challenge	48LOSCH Motorsport by Black Falcon	1	0	0	0	0	14	23rd
2026	Intercontinental GT Challenge	Winward Racing	1	0	0	0	0	14	23rd
2026	Intercontinental GT Challenge	RS1	1	0	0	0	0	14	23rd
2026	GT World Challenge Europe Endurance Cup	Winward Racing	1	0	0	0	0	0	NC
2026	GT World Challenge Europe Endurance Cup – Bronze	Winward Racing	1	0	0	0	0	15	25th
2026	Russian Circuit Racing Series – Mitjet	Sila Motorsport	2	1	0	0	2	0	NC†
2026	GT World Challenge America – Pro-Am	RS1	1	0	0	0	0	0	NC†

=== Complete GT World Challenge Europe results ===
==== GT World Challenge Europe Sprint Cup ====
(key) (Races in bold indicate pole position) (Races in italics indicate fastest lap)

Year	Team	Car	Class	1	2	3	4	5	6	7	8	9	10	Pos.	Points
2022	GSM Novamarine	Lamborghini Huracán GT3 Evo	Silver	BRH; 1	BRH; 2	MAG; 1	MAG; 2	ZAN; 1	ZAN; 2	MIS; 1 Ret	MIS; 2; 17	VAL; 1	VAL; 2	17th	3

==== GT World Challenge Europe Endurance Cup ====
(Races in bold indicate pole position) (Races in italics indicate fastest lap)

Year	Team	Car	Class	1	2	3	4	5	6	7	Pos.	Points
2024	Winward Racing	Mercedes-AMG GT3 Evo	Silver	LEC; 19	SPA; 6H; 14	SPA; 12H; 19	**SPA**; **24H**; 28	NÜR; 25	MNZ; 9	JED	1st	102
2025	Winward Racing	Mercedes-AMG GT3 Evo	Bronze	LEC	MNZ	SPA; 6H; 38	SPA; 12H; 26	SPA; 24H; 17	NÜR	BAR	14th	27
2026	Winward Racing	Mercedes-AMG GT3 Evo	Bronze	LEC	MNZ	SPA; 6H; 40	SPA; 12H; 31	SPA; 24H; 21	NÜR	ALG	25th	15

=== Complete GT World Challenge Asia results ===
(key) (Races in bold indicate pole position) (Races in italics indicate fastest lap)

Year	Team	Car	Class	1	2	3	4	5	6	7	8	9	10	11	12	DC	Points
2025	Vollgas Motorsports	Porsche 911 GT3 R (992)	Silver-Am	SEP; 1	SEP; 2	MAN; 1; 6	MAN; 2; 3	BUR; 1; 4	BUR; 2; 4	FUJ; 1; 5	**FUJ**; **2**; 4	OKA; 1; 3	**OKA**; **2** Ret	BEI; 1	BEI; 2	9th	84

=== Complete Michelin Pilot Challenge results ===
(key) (Races in bold indicate pole position) (Races in italics indicate fastest lap)

Year	Entrant	Class	Make	1	2	3	4	5	6	7	8	9	10	Rank	Points
2025	Winward Racing	Grand Sport	Mercedes-AMG GT4	DAY	SEB	LGA	MOH	WGL	MOS	ELK	VIR; 23	IMS; 8	ATL; 8	38th	540
2026	Winward Racing	Grand Sport	Mercedes-AMG GT4	DAY; 3	SEB; 2	LGA; 4	MOH; 24	WGL	MOS; 21	ELK; 8	VIR; 18	IMS; 4	ATL; 31	13th	1720
