= Karol Basz =

Polish racing driver (born 1991)

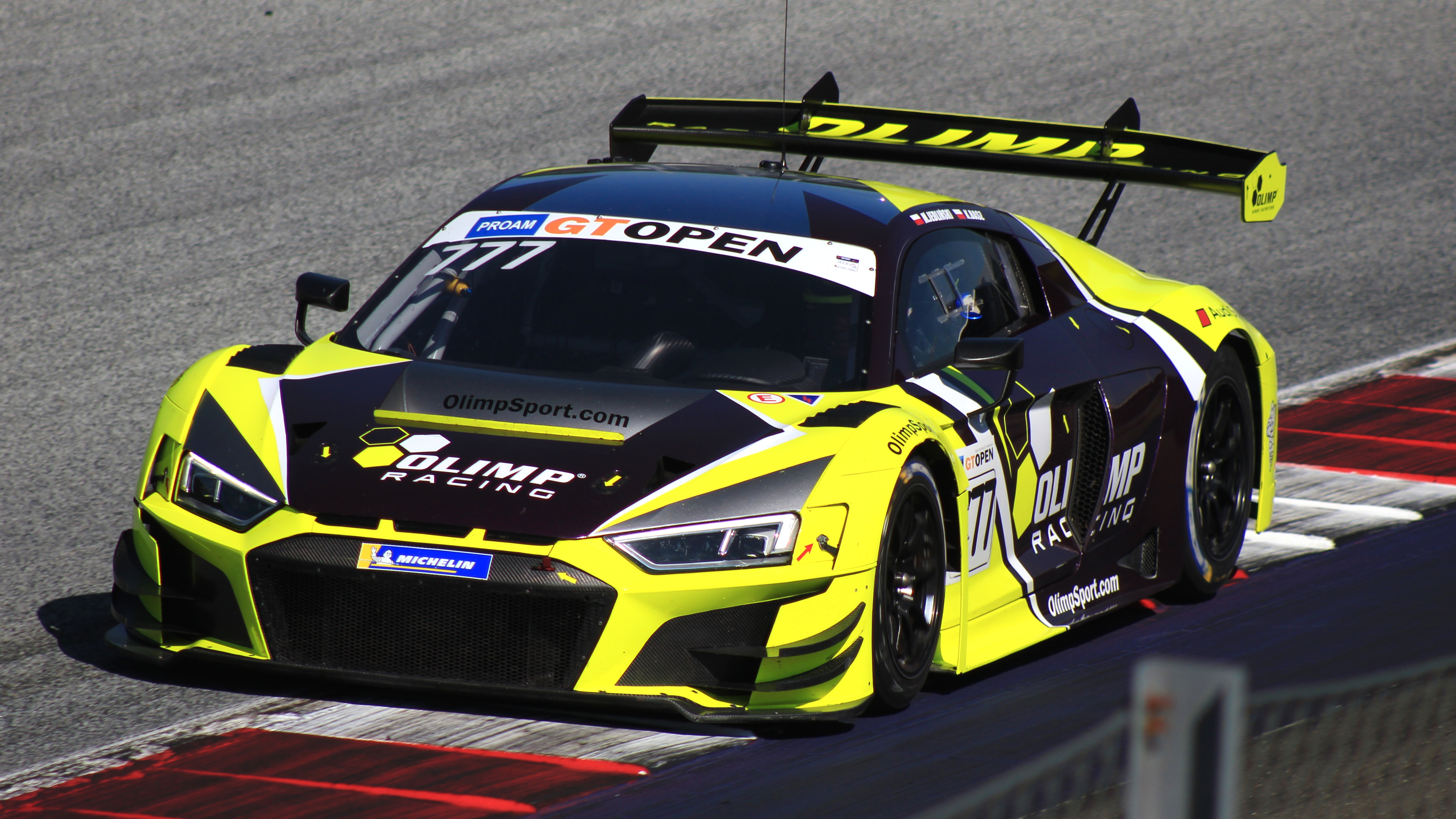
- Basz in 2023
- Nationality: (Poland) Polish
- Born: Rafał Karol Basz; 12 November 1991 (age 34) Kraków, Poland
- Categorisation: FIA Silver

Championship titles
- 2022 2020: International GT Open – Pro-Am; Lamborghini Super Trofeo Europe – Pro-Am

Rafał Karol Basz (born 12 November 1991) is a Polish racing driver who last competed in International GT Open for Olimp Racing.

He is a two-time Lamborghini World Finals champion, having won it in the Pro-Am class in 2019 alongside Bartosz Paziewski and overall in 2021 alongside Mattia Michelotto. In addition, he also won the Karting World Championship in 2015 in the KF class and is also a Lamborghini Super Trofeo Europe and International GT Open class champion.

== Early career ==
Basz was born on 12 November 1991 in Kraków. He began karting in 2001, racing mainly in the Polish Karting Championship and winning the 2004 edition of it in the K60A class. After getting a karting license in 2004, Basz won the next two editions of the Polish Karting Championship in the ICA-Junior class. In 2007, Basz began racing full-time in Europe, along with a campaign in the WSK International Series.

After stints with Robert Kubica's karting team and Birel Motorsport, Basz joined Tony Kart and won the 2013 International Super Cup and the 2014 WSK Champions Cup in the KF class. Basz then joined Kosmic Racing Department in 2014 and stayed with them until the end of his karting career in 2018. With Kosmic Racing Department, Basz won the WSK Gold Cup and the Karting World Championship in the KF class in 2015, and also won the WSK Final Cup in 2016 in the newly-rebranded OK class.

== Career ==
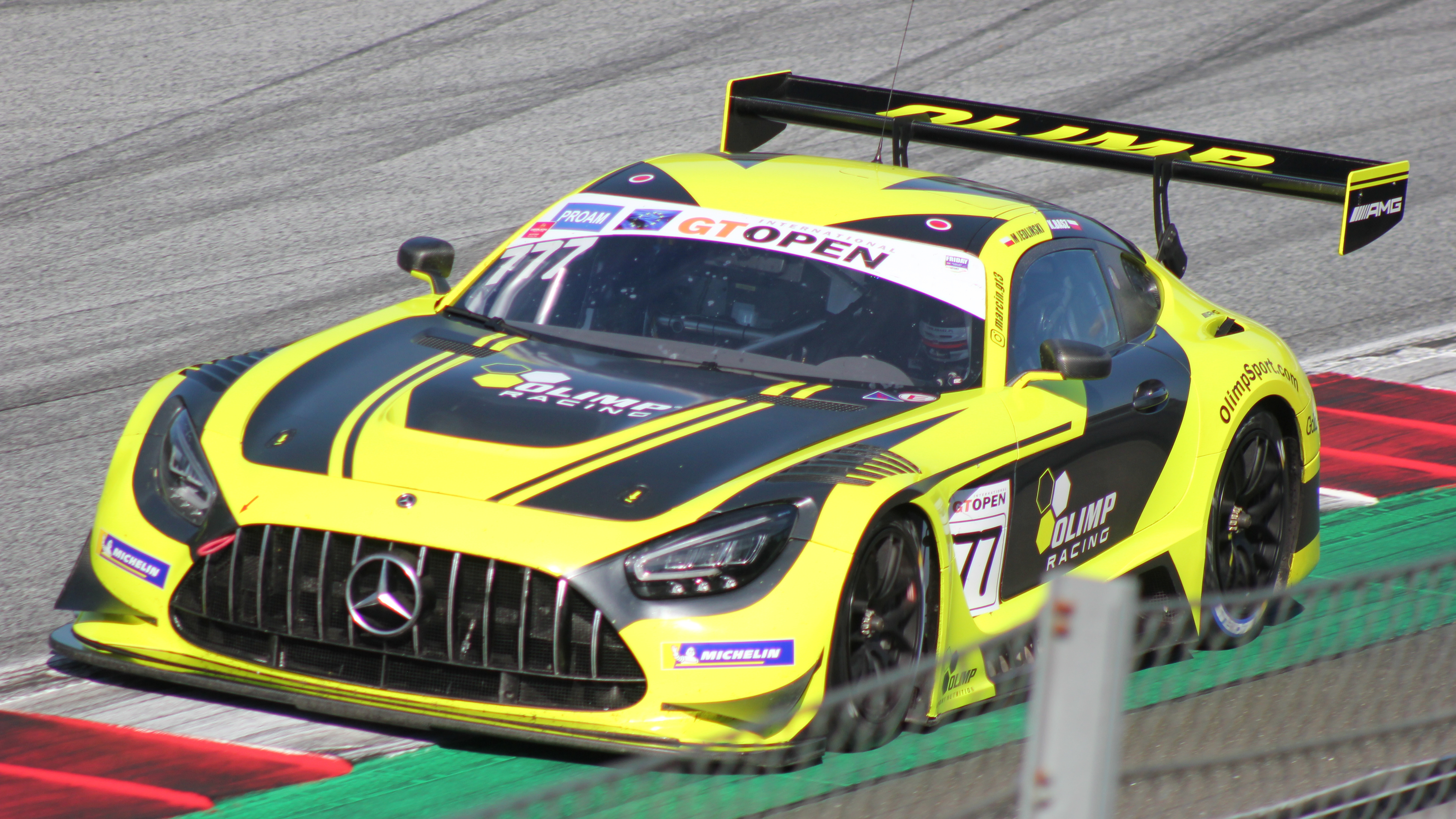
Basz's Olimp Mercedes during the 2021 International GT Open season.

Stepping up to car racing in 2017, Basz joined Antonelli Motorsport to compete in the Super GT Cup class of the Italian GT Championship. In the 14-race season, Basz took his best result of second at Mugello, and scored three more podiums to finish 11th in the standings.

The following year, Basz joined Imperiale Racing to compete in Lamborghini Super Trofeo Europe alongside Vito Postiglione, along with joining the Lamborghini Young Driver programme the same year. Basz won race two of the season-opening Monza round, before taking further wins at Silverstone and Misano and taking the points lead following the midway point of the season at Spa. But after winning at Nürburgring, Basz retired in the final round of the season at Vallelunga and finished runner-up in the standings. During 2018, Basz also competed with the same team in the Italian GT Championship on a part-time basis.

After finishing runner-up in Lamborghini Super Trofeo Middle East in early 2019, Basz returned to Imperiale Racing for the Super Trofeo Europe season partnering Bartosz Paziewski. After switching to the Pro-Am class at the final round of the Super Trofeo Europe season, Basz won the Lamborghini World Finals with Paziewski in the Pro-Am class at Jerez.

Remaining in Lamborghini Super Trofeo Europe for 2020, Basz joined Vincenzo Sospiri Racing alongside Andrzej Lewandowski. Basz won both races at Misano and Nürburgring in Pro-Am to lead the standings early on. Despite a retirement at Barcelona in race one, the Polish duo won the next three races in class to clinch the Pro-Am title a round early.

Basz stayed with Vincenzo Sospiri Racing for the 2021 Lamborghini Super Trofeo Europe season, alongside Andrzej Lewandowski in the Pro-Am class. The Polish duo won five times in their class, but after missing the Nürburgring round, Basz finished runner-up to Lewandowski in the Pro-Am standings. Staying with the team for the World Finals, Basz partnered up with Mattia Michelotto and won both races at Misano to become 2021 Lamborghini World Finals champion overall. During 2021, Basz also made his debut in International GT Open for Olimp Racing alongside Marcin Jedlinski on a part-time basis, and also made a cameo in GT World Challenge Europe Endurance Cup for JP Motorsport's McLaren.

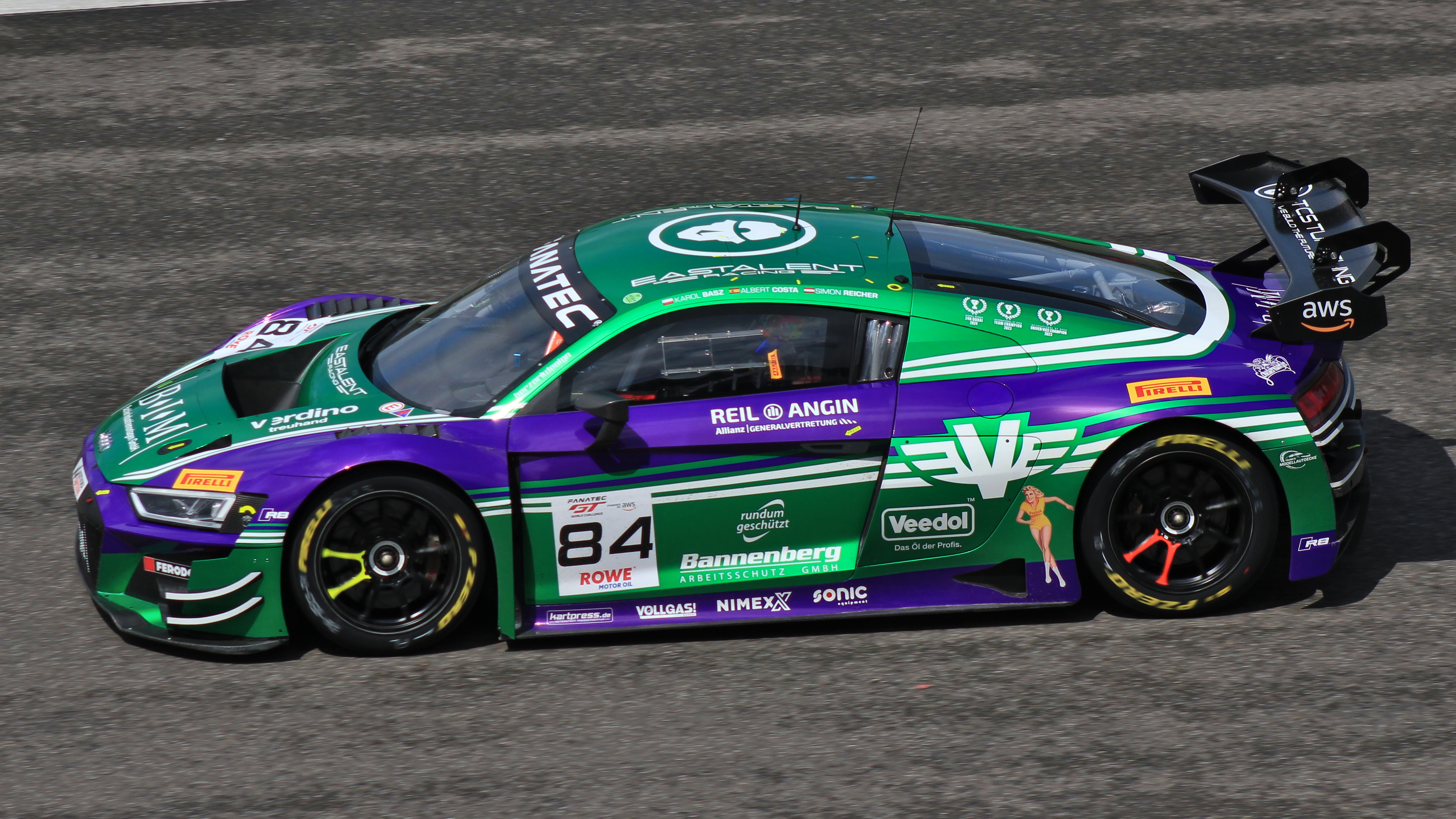
Basz at the wheel of an Eastalent Audi in the 2024 GT World Challenge Europe.

In 2022, Basz returned to Olimp Racing for his sophomore season in International GT Open, as the team switched from Mercedes to Audi machinery. In the 13-race season, Basz scored three Pro-Am wins, which included two overall podiums scored in both Le Castellet and Barcelona, on his way to his maiden class title in International GT Open. During the year, Basz also raced in Lamborghini Super Trofeo Europe for Micanek Motorsport, represented Poland in the FIA Motorsport Games, and also raced for Vincenzo Sospiri Racing in Italian GT and the 24 Hours of Spa.

Staying with Olimp Racing for a third season, Basz swept both Red Bull Ring races in Pro-Am and took further class wins at the Hungaroring and Monza to finish runner-up in the Pro-Am standings. During 2023, Basz returned to Lamborghini Super Trofeo Europe, driving for Mičánek Motorsport alongside Broněk Formánek.

Returning to Olimp Racing for 2024, Basz rejoined Marcin Jedliński as the sole Audi R8 LMS Evo II in the team. Basz took pole for the season-opening round at Algarve and finished third overall in race one, before winning in class at the following round in Spa. After five further Pro-Am podiums, Basz finished runner-up to Marco Pulcini for the class title by eight points. During 2024, Basz also drove for Madpanda Motorsport and Eastalent Racing in select races between GT World Challenge Europe Endurance Cup and GT World Challenge Europe Sprint Cup.

Basz returned to Olimp Racing for 2025 as the team fully committed to the Ferrari 296 GT3. Basz also joined GetSpeed's Silver Cup effort in GT World Challenge Europe Endurance Cup, aboard a Mercedes-AMG GT3 Evo. Finishing 18th in the Silver Cup standings of the latter, Basz found more success in GT Open, in which he scored a Pro-Am podium at Spa and ended the year sixth in the class standings.

The following year, Basz remained with Olimp Racing for his sixth season in the Pro-Am class of the series. Racing alongside Marcin Jedliński, Basz took a lone class win at Barcelona on a one-off return to the Audi R8, whilst scoring three other podiums with the Ferrari 296 en route to fourth in Pro-Am. During 2026, Basz also raced at the 24 Hours of Spa for GetSpeed Team Bartone Bros.

== Karting record ==
=== Karting career summary ===
Season	Series	Team	Position
2005	Torneo Industrie - 100 Junior		44th
2005	Karting European Championship - ICA Junior	Polski Zwiazek Motorowy	NC
2006	Torneo Industrie - 100 Junior		26th
2006	South Garda Winter Cup - 100 Junior		NC
2006	WSK International Series - Junior		62nd
2006	Karting European Championship - ICA Junior		25th
2007	South Garda Winter Cup - KF2		NC
2007	Torneo Industrie - KF2		6th
2007	Copa Campeones - KF2	MGM Racing	16th
2007	WSK International Series - KF2		31st
2007	Karting European Championship - KF2		10th
2008	Andrea Margutti Trophy - KF2	MGM Racing	31st
2008	South Garda Winter Cup - KF2	MGM Racing	18th
2008	Andrea Margutti Trophy - KF2	MGM Racing	3rd
2008	WSK International Series - KF2	MGM Racing	29th
2008	Karting European Championship - KF2	MGM Racing	NC
2008	Asia-Pacific Karting Championship - KF2	MGM Racing	8th
2008	World Karting Cup - KF2	MGM Racing	25th
2009	South Garda Winter Cup - KF2	Savani Competition	NC
2009	WSK International Series - KF2	Robert Kubica Kart Team	9th
2009	Karting European Championship - KF2	Birel Motorsport	11th
2009	World Karting Cup - KF2	Birel Motorsport	10th
2010	South Garda Winter Cup - KF2	Birel Motorsport	11th
2010	WSK Euro Series - KF2	Birel Motorsport	4th
2010	Karting European Championship - KF2	Birel Motorsport	26th
2010	WSK World Series - KF2	Birel Motorsport	7th
2010	WSK Nations Cup - KF2	Birel Motorsport	2nd
2010	Macau International Karting Grand Prix - SKF	Birel Motorsport	12th
2011	South Garda Winter Cup - KF2	Birel Motorsport	9th
2011	WSK Euro Series - KF2	Birel Motorsport	4th
2011	Karting European Championship - KF1	Birel Motorsport	5th
2012	South Garda Winter Cup - KF2	Birel Motorsport	28th
2012	WSK Euro Series - KF2	Birel Motorsport	14th
2012	Karting European Championship - KF2	Birel Motorsport	18th
2012	Karting World Championship - KF1	Birel Motorsport	7th
2012	German Kart Championship - KF1	DP-RK Official Racing Germany	14th
2012	WSK Master Series - KF2	BirelArt Racing	7th
2012	Karting World Cup - KF2		11th
2013	WSK Super Master Series - KF	Tony Kart Racing Team	3rd
2013	WSK Euro Series - KF	Tony Kart Racing Team	4th
2013	Karting European Championship - KF	Tony Kart Racing Team	4th
2013	International Super Cup - KF	Tony Kart Racing Team	1st
2013	Karting World Championship - KF	Tony Kart Racing Team	4th
2013	South Garda Winter Cup - KF2		6th
2014	South Garda Winter Cup - KF2	Tony Kart Racing Team	7th
2014	WSK Champions Cup - KF	Tony Kart Racing Team	1st
2014	WSK Super Master Series - KF	Tony Kart Racing Team	3rd
2014	Karting European Championship - KF	Tony Kart Racing Team	11th
2014	Karting World Championship - KF	Tony Kart Racing Team	7th
2015	South Garda Winter Cup - KF	Kosmic Racing Department	12th
2015	WSK Champions Cup - KF	Kosmic Racing Department	3rd
2015	WSK Super Master Series - KF	Kosmic Racing Department	2nd
2015	WSK Gold Cup - KF	Kosmic Racing Department	1st
2015	Karting European Championship - KF	Kosmic Racing Department	8th
2015	Karting World Championship - KF	Kosmic Racing Department	1st
2015	WSK Final Cup - KF	Kosmic Racing Department	3rd
2016	South Garda Winter Cup - OK	Kosmic Racing Department	3rd
2016	WSK Champions Cup - OK	Kosmic Racing Department	2nd
2016	WSK Super Master Series - OK	Kosmic Racing Department	2nd
2016	German Kart Championship - OK	Kosmic Racing Department	2nd
2016	Karting European Championship - OK	Kosmic Racing Department	3rd
2016	Karting World Championship - OK	Kosmic Racing Department	2nd
2016	WSK Final Cup - OK	Kosmic Racing Department	1st
2017	South Garda Winter Cup - OK	Kosmic Racing Department	4th
2017	WSK Champions Cup - OK	Kosmic Racing Department	10th
2017	WSK Super Master Series - OK	Kosmic Racing Department	2nd
2017	WSK Final Cup - OK	Kosmic Racing Department	12th
2017	Karting World Championship - OK	Kosmic Racing Department	4th
2018	Karting World Championship - OK	Kosmic Racing Department	7th

== Racing record ==
=== Racing career summary ===
Season	Series	Team	Races	Wins	Poles	F/Laps	Podiums	Points	Position
2014	Volkswagen Castrol Cup		2	0	0	0	0	0	NC
2017	Italian GT Championship – Super GT Cup	Antonelli Motorsport	12	0	1	0	4	71	11th
2018	Lamborghini Super Trofeo North America – Pro		2	0	0	0	1	18	5th
2018	Lamborghini Super Trofeo Europe – Pro	Imperiale Racing	12	4	3	2	7	111	**2nd**
2018	Lamborghini Super Trofeo World Final – Pro	Imperiale Racing	1	0	0	0	0	0	NC
2018	Italian GT Championship – GT3	Imperiale Racing	4	0	0	0	3	46	12th
2019	Lamborghini Super Trofeo Middle East – Pro	FFF Racing Team	3	0	0	0	3	??	**2nd**
2019	Lamborghini Super Trofeo Europe – Pro	Imperiale Racing	8	1	2	2	4	79	4th
2019	Lamborghini Super Trofeo Europe – Pro-Am	Imperiale Racing	2	1	0	0	1	22	13th
2019	Lamborghini Super Trofeo World Final – Pro-Am	Imperiale Racing	2	2	0	0	2	30	**1st**
2019	24H GT European Series – A6	OLIMP Racing	2	0	0	0	0	15	21st
2020	Lamborghini Super Trofeo Europe – Pro-Am	VS Racing	?	?	?	?	?	147	**1st**
2021	International GT Open – Pro-Am	OLIMP Racing	6	0	1	0	2	23	10th
2021	Lamborghini Super Trofeo Europe – Pro-Am	Vincenzo Sospiri Racing	8	5	4	0	6	103	**2nd**
2021	GT World Challenge Europe Endurance Cup	JP Motorsport	1	0	0	0	0	0	NC
2021	Italian GT Endurance Championship – GT3 Pro	Audi Sport Team Italia	2	0	0	0	0	7	14th
2021	Italian GT Sprint Championship – GT3 Pro	Easy Race	2	0	0	0	0	0	NC
2022	Lamborghini Super Trofeo Europe – Pro-Am	Micanek Motorsport ACCR	6	4	0	0	5	72	7th
2022	International GT Open	Olimp Racing	13	0	2	3	2	60	5th
2022	International GT Open – Pro-Am	Olimp Racing	13	3	4	3	6	67	**1st**
2022	GT World Challenge Europe Endurance Cup	Vincenzo Sospiri Racing	1	0	0	0	0	0	NC
2022	GT World Challenge Europe Endurance Cup – Silver	Vincenzo Sospiri Racing	1	0	0	0	0	10	23rd
2022	Intercontinental GT Challenge	Vincenzo Sospiri Racing	1	0	0	0	0	0	NC
2022	Italian GT Endurance Championship – GT3 Pro	Vincenzo Sospiri Racing	4	1	0	0	2	41	4th
2022	FIA Motorsport Games GT Cup	Team Poland	1	0	0	0	0	—N/a	4th
2023	Lamborghini Super Trofeo Europe – Pro-Am	Micanek Motorsport ACCR Team powered by Buggyra	11	0	0	0	2	43.5	8th
2023	Lamborghini Super Trofeo World Finals – Pro-Am	Micanek Motorsport ACCR Team powered by Buggyra	2	0	0	0	0	5	12th
2023	International GT Open	Olimp Racing	13	0	0	1	0	28	11th
2023	International GT Open – Pro-Am	Olimp Racing	13	4	2	1	6	68	**2nd**
2024	GT Winter Series – GT3	Olimp Racing	0	0	0	0	0	0	NC
2024	International GT Open	Olimp Racing	14	0	1	1	1	25	17th
2024	International GT Open – Pro-Am	Olimp Racing	14	1	2	1	7	87	**2nd**
2024	GT World Challenge Europe Sprint Cup	Eastalent Racing	2	0	0	0	0	0	NC
2024	GT World Challenge Europe Sprint Cup – Silver	Eastalent Racing	2	0	1	0	1	10.5	16th
2024	GT World Challenge Europe Endurance Cup	Eastalent Racing	1	0	0	0	0	0	NC
2024	GT World Challenge Europe Endurance Cup	Madpanda Motorsport	1	0	0	0	0	0	NC
2024	GT World Challenge Europe Endurance Cup – Silver	Madpanda Motorsport	1	0	0	0	0	23	23rd
2025	International GT Open	Olimp Racing	14	0	0	0	0	3	38th
2025	International GT Open – Pro-Am	Olimp Racing	14	0	2	0	1	45	6th
2025	GT World Challenge Europe Endurance Cup	GetSpeed	5	0	0	0	0	0	NC
2025	GT World Challenge Europe Endurance Cup - Silver	GetSpeed	5	0	0	0	0	22	18th
2025	TSS The Super Series - GT3	B-Quik Absolute Racing	4	0	1	0	2	40	9th
2026	GT Winter Series – GT3	Olimp Racing	3	2	0	0	3	58	14th
2026	International GT Open	Olimp Racing	14	0	0	0	0	11	29th
2026	International GT Open – Pro-Am	Olimp Racing	14	1	3	5	4	80	4th
2026	GT World Challenge Europe Endurance Cup	GetSpeed Team Bartone Bros	1	0	0	0	0	0	NC
2026	GT World Challenge Europe Endurance Cup – Silver	GetSpeed Team Bartone Bros	1	0	1	0	0	13	24th
2026	Intercontinental GT Challenge	GetSpeed Team Bartone Bros	1	0	0	0	0	0	NC

=== Complete International GT Open results ===
(key) (Races in bold indicate pole position) (Races in italics indicate fastest lap)

Year	Team	Car	Class	1	2	3	4	5	6	7	8	9	10	11	12	13	14	Pos.	Points
2021	Olimp Racing	Mercedes-AMG GT3 Evo	Pro-Am	LEC; 1	LEC; 2	SPA; 1	SPA; 2	HUN; 1; 3	HUN; 2; 6	IMO; 1	IMO; 2	RBR; 1; 4	RBR; 2; 2	MNZ; 1	MNZ; 2	CAT; 1; 8	CAT; 2; 5	10th	23
2022	Olimp Racing	Audi R8 LMS Evo II	Pro-Am	EST; 1; 3	EST; 2; 2	LEC; 1; 1	LEC; 2; 8	SPA; 1	HUN; 1 Ret	HUN; 2; 3	RBR; 1; 7	RBR; 2 Ret	MNZ; 1; 7	MNZ; 2; 7†	CAT; 1; 1	CAT; 2; 5		1st	67
2023	Olimp Racing	Mercedes-AMG GT3 Evo	Pro-Am	ALG; 1; 6	ALG; 2; 3	SPA; 7												2nd	68
2023	Olimp Racing	Audi R8 LMS Evo II	Pro-Am				HUN; 1; 4	HUN; 2; 1	LEC; 1; 7	LEC; 2; 6	RBR; 1; 1	RBR; 2; 1	MNZ; 1; 4	MNZ; 2; 1	CAT; 1; 7	CAT; 2; 2		2nd	68
2024	Olimp Racing	Audi R8 LMS Evo II	Pro-Am	**ALG**; **1**; 2	ALG; 2; 13	HOC; 1; 2	HOC; 2; 13	SPA; 1	HUN; 1; 8	HUN; 2; 3	LEC; 1; 6	LEC; 2; 5	RBR; 1; 2	RBR; 2; 14	CAT; 1; 4	CAT; 2; 2	MNZ; 2	2nd	87
2025	Olimp Racing	Ferrari 296 GT3	Pro-Am	ALG; 1; 8	ALG; 2; 11								RBR; 1; 4	RBR; 2; 5	CAT; 1; 7	CAT; 2; 11		6th	45
2025	Olimp Racing	Audi R8 LMS Evo II	Pro-Am			**SPA**; 3	HOC; 1; 5	HOC; 2 Ret	HUN; 1; 12	HUN; 2; 5	**LEC**; **1**; 9	LEC; 2; 4					MNZ; 5	6th	45
2026	Olimp Racing	Ferrari 296 GT3 Evo	Pro-Am	**ALG**; **1**; 7	ALG; 2; 4	SPA; 4	**MIS**; **1**; 4	MIS; 2; 2	HUN; 1; 4	HUN; 2; 3	LEC; 1 Ret	**LEC**; **2**; 2	HOC; 1; 5	HOC; 2; 4	MNZ; 4			4th	80
2026	Olimp Racing	Audi R8 LMS Evo II	Pro-Am													CAT; 1; 5	CAT; 2; 1	4th	80

=== Complete GT World Challenge results ===
==== GT World Challenge Europe Endurance Cup ====
(Races in bold indicate pole position) (Races in italics indicate fastest lap)

Year	Team	Car	Class	1	2	3	4	5	6	7	Pos.	Points
2021	JP Motorsport	McLaren 720S GT3	Pro	MON	LEC; 29	SPA; 6H	SPA; 12H	SPA; 24H	NÜR	CAT	NC	0
2022	Vincenzo Sospiri Racing	Lamborghini Huracán GT3 Evo	Silver	IMO	LEC	SPA; 6H; 34	SPA; 12H; 25	SPA; 24H; 35	HOC	CAT	23rd	10
2024	Madpanda Motorsport	Mercedes-AMG GT3 Evo	Silver	LEC	SPA; 6H; 19	SPA; 12H; 43	SPA; 24H; 31				23rd	23
2024	Eastalent Racing	Audi R8 LMS Evo II	Pro					NÜR; 26	MNZ	JED	NC	0
2025	GetSpeed	Mercedes-AMG GT3 Evo	Silver	LEC; 43	MNZ; 18	SPA; 6H; 64†	SPA; 12H; 66†	SPA; 24H; Ret	NÜR; 27	BAR; 27	18th	22
2026	GetSpeed Team Bartone Bros	Mercedes-AMG GT3 Evo	Silver	LEC	MNZ	SPA; 6H; 33	SPA; 12H; 26	**SPA**; **24H**; 28	NÜR	ALG	24th	13

^{*}Season still in progress.

^{†} Did not finish, but was classified as he had completed more than 90% of the race distance.

==== Complete GT World Challenge Europe Sprint Cup results ====
(key) (Races in bold indicate pole position; results in italics indicate fastest lap)

Year	Team	Car	Class	1	2	3	4	5	6	7	8	9	10	Pos.	Points
2024	Eastalent Racing	Audi R8 LMS Evo II	Silver	BRH; 1	BRH; 2	MIS; 1	MIS; 2	HOC; 1	HOC; 2	MAG; 1	MAG; 2	CAT; 1; 13	**CAT**; **2**; 15	16th	10.5
