= Sebastian Balthasar =

German racing driver

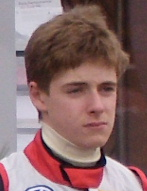
- Sebastian Balthasar in 2012
- Nationality: (Germany) German
- Born: 30 August 1996 (age 30) Cologne, Germany
- Categorisation: FIA Silver

Sebastian Balthasar (Cologne, Germany, 30 August 1996) is a German racing driver.

== Career ==
=== Karting ===
Balthasar started his racing career in the 2009 karting season. He became third in the Rotax Max Challenge Germany. A year later, he entered the Ciao Thomas Knopper Memorial, the ADAC Kart Championship, the German Junior Kart Championship and the Andrea Margutti Trophy, with a tenth place as his best result. He continued karting throughout 2011 and 2012, again entering the German Junior Karts, besides racing in the DMV Kart Championship and the Euro Wintercup.

=== Formula racing ===
Balthasar made the switch to formula racing in 2012, when he entered the ADAC Formel Masters, as the teammate of Alessio Picariello, which he would race again in 2014. With a best result of fourth, he finished 13th in the championship. He then entered the 2012-13 MRF Challenge Formula 2000 Championship season, finishing 19th.

Things changed when he entered the 2013 German Formula Three season, finishing only tenth in the ATS Formel 3 Cup, but winning the ATS Formula 3 Trophy.

In 2014, Balthaser competed in FA1, part of Acceleration 2014. He also joined Hilmer Motorsport for a partial season in GP3 Series, but failed to score any points, finishing 32nd in the overall standings.

== Racing Record ==
=== Career summary ===
Year	Series	Team	Races	Wins	Poles	F/Laps	Podiums	Points	Position
2012	ADAC Formel Masters	G&J/Schiler Motorsport	23	0	0	0	0	37	13th
2012-13	MRF Challenge Formula 2000 Championship	MRF Racing	4	0	0	0	0	9	19th
2013	German Formula 3 Championship	GU-Racing	28	0	0	0	0	54	10th
2014	GP3 Series	Hilmer Motorsport	8	0	0	0	0	0	32nd
2014	Formula Acceleration 1	Acceleration Team Germany	10	0	0	0	3	76	4th
2014-15	MRF Challenge Formula 2000 Championship	MRF Racing	4	0	1	0	0	8	20th
2015-16	MRF Challenge Formula 2000 Championship	MRF Racing	4	0	0	0	0	6	20th
2020	Lamborghini Super Trofeo Europe - Pro	Leipert Motorsport	?	?	?	?	?	?	?
2021	Lamborghini Super Trofeo Europe - Pro	Leipert Motorsport	?	?	?	?	?	?	?
2021	24H GT Series - GT3	Leipert Motorsport	1	0	0	0	0	0	NC
2022	Italian GT Championship - GT3 Pro-Am	Imperiale Racing	3	1	0	0	2	32	NC
2022	Italian GT Championship	Imperiale Racing	3	0	0	0	0		NC
2023	Lamborghini Super Trofeo Europe - Pro	Oregon Team							
2024	Lamborghini Super Trofeo Europe	Leipert Motorsport							
2025	Lamborghini Super Trofeo Europe - Pro	BDR Competition by Group Prom	2	0	0	0	1	0	NC†

=== Complete Formula Acceleration 1 results ===
(key) (Races in bold indicate pole position) (Races in italics indicate fastest lap)

Year	Team	1	2	3	4	5	6	7	8	9	10	Pos	Points
2014	Germany	ALG; 1; 3	ALG; 2; 4	NAV; 1; 7	NAV; 2; 3	NÜR; 1 DNS	NÜR; 2; 5	MNZ; 1; 9	MNZ; 2; 3	ASS; 1; 7	ASS; 2; 9	**4th**	**76**

=== Complete GP3 Series results ===
(key) (Races in bold indicate pole position) (Races in italics indicate fastest lap)

Year	Entrant	1	2	3	4	5	6	7	8	9	10	11	12	13	14	15	16	17	18	Pos	Points
2014	Hilmer Motorsport	CAT; FEA	CAT; SPR	RBR; FEA	RBR; SPR	SIL; FEA; 22	SIL; SPR; Ret	HOC; FEA; 24	HOC; SPR; 21	HUN; FEA; Ret	HUN; SPR; 17	SPA; FEA; 19†	SPA; SPR; DNS	MNZ; FEA; Ret	MNZ; SPR; DNS	SOC; FEA	SOC; SPR	YMC; FEA	YMC; SPR	32nd	0

† Driver did not finish the race, but was classified as he completed over 90% of the race distance.
