= 2020 Lamborghini Super Trofeo Europe =

The 2020 Lamborghini Super Trofeo Europe was the twelfth season. The calendar consisted of five rounds. Every event featured two 50 Minute races. 2020 marked the 2nd season of the Lamborghini Huracán Super Trofeo Evo. There can be two drivers or one driver per car. A car is entered in one of four categories: Pro, Pro-Am, Am and Lamborghini Cup (LC)

== Calendar ==
Rnd.	Circuit	Date
1	(Italy) Misano World Circuit Marco Simoncelli	7-9 August
2	(Germany) Nürburgring	4-5 September
3	(Spain) Circuit de Catalunya	9-11 October
4	(Belgium) Circuit de Spa-Francorchamps	20-24 October
5	(France) Circuit Paul Ricard	13-15 November

== Entry list ==
Team	No.	Drivers	Class	Rounds
(Germany) Leipert Motorsport	2	(Germany) Sebastian Balthasar	P	All
(Germany) Leipert Motorsport	2	(Norway) Markus Paverud	P	1–2
(Germany) Leipert Motorsport	2	(Denmark) Noah Watt	P	3–5
(Germany) Leipert Motorsport	21	(Luxembourg) Yury Wagner	PA	All
(Germany) Leipert Motorsport	21	(Switzerland) Panagiotis Takis Spiliopoulos	PA	1
(Germany) Leipert Motorsport	21	(Germany) Fidel Leib	PA	2–5
(Germany) Leipert Motorsport	30	(Finland) Mikko Eskelinen	PA	1, 3–5
(Germany) Leipert Motorsport	30	(Finland) Elias Niskanen	PA	1, 3–5
(Germany) Leipert Motorsport	69	(Spain) Guillem Pujeu Beya	P	All
(Germany) Leipert Motorsport	69	(United Kingdom) Jake Rattenbury	P	1–3
(Germany) Leipert Motorsport	69	(Germany) Jonathan Judek	P	4
(Germany) Leipert Motorsport	69	(Finland) Luka Nurmi	P	5
(Belgium) Boutsen Ginion Racing	4	(Italy) Giuseppe Fascicolo	Am	All
(Belgium) Boutsen Ginion Racing	4	(France) Claude-Yves Gosselin	Am	1–3, 5
(Belgium) Boutsen Ginion Racing	4	(France) Marc Rostan	Am	4
(Italy) VS Racing	6	(Finland) Olli Parhankangas	P	1–2, 4
(Italy) VS Racing	6	(Italy) Edoardo Liberati	P	1
(Italy) VS Racing	6	(Spain) Sebastián Fernández	P	3
(Italy) VS Racing	6	(Japan) Yuki Nemoto	P	4
(Italy) VS Racing	6	(Italy) Alessio Deledda	P	5
(Italy) VS Racing	16	(Poland) Andrzej Lewandowski	PA	All
(Italy) VS Racing	16	(Poland) Karol Basz	PA	All
(Monaco) GSM Racing	7	(United States) Patrick Liddy	P	All
(Monaco) GSM Racing	7	(Venezuela) Jonathan Cecotto	P	All
(China) FFF Racing Team	8	(Italy) Donovan Privitelio	LC	5
(China) FFF Racing Team	8	(Italy) Luciano Privitelio	LC	5
(Italy) Target Racing	9	(Denmark) Kevin Rossel	P	All
(Italy) Target Racing	9	(Italy) Alberto Di Folco	P	All
(Italy) Target Racing	41	(Mexico) Raúl Guzmán	P	All
(Italy) Target Racing	41	(Serbia) Miloš Pavlović	P	All
(Italy) Target Racing	53	(Italy) Massimo Mantovani	Am	All
(Italy) Target Racing	53	(Sri Lanka) Dilantha Malagamuwa	Am	3–5
(Italy) Oregon Team	11	(Italy) Kevin Gilardoni	P	All
(Italy) Oregon Team	11	(France) Dorian Boccolacci	P	1–3, 5
(Italy) Oregon Team	14	(Switzerland) Lorenzo Bontempelli	PA	1–3, 5
(Italy) Oregon Team	14	(Italy) Damiano Fioravanti	PA	1–2
(Italy) Oregon Team	14	(Brazil) Victor Franzoni	PA	3
(Italy) Oregon Team	14	(Italy) Massimo Ciglia	PA	5
(Switzerland) Autovitesse	19	(Switzerland) Herve Leimer	LC	5
(Switzerland) Autovitesse	63	(Switzerland) Cedric Leimer	Am	1, 5
(Switzerland) Autovitesse	63	(Switzerland) Laurent Jenny	Am	1
(Czech Republic) Micanek Motorsport ACCR	22	(Germany) Kurt Wagner	LC	All
(Czech Republic) Micanek Motorsport ACCR	22	(Czech Republic) Libor Dvoracek	LC	All
(Czech Republic) Micanek Motorsport ACCR	66	(Czech Republic) Bronek Formanek	PA	1–2, 5
(Czech Republic) Micanek Motorsport ACCR	66	(Czech Republic) Jakub Knoll	PA	1–2
(Czech Republic) Micanek Motorsport ACCR	66	(Czech Republic) Josef Zaruba	PA	5
(Germany) AKF Motorsport	24	(Germany) Oliver Freymuth	Am	2
(Austria) Konrad Motorsport	27	(Germany) Matthias Hoffsuemmer	LC	4
(Austria) Konrad Motorsport	27	(Canada) Ray Calvin	LC	4
(Austria) Konrad Motorsport	28	(Germany) Vincent Schwartz	PA	1–2
(Austria) Konrad Motorsport	28	(Austria) Franz Konrad	PA	1–2
(Austria) Konrad Motorsport	28	(Germany) Vincent Schwartz	P	4
(Austria) Konrad Motorsport	29	(Germany) Martin Lechmann	P	1
(Austria) Konrad Motorsport	29	(Germany) Martin Lechmann	LC	2, 4
(Austria) Konrad Motorsport	29	(Germany) Emir Keserovic	LC	2, 4
(Italy) Bonaldi Motorsport	33	(United Kingdom) Dean Stoneman	P	All
(Italy) Bonaldi Motorsport	33	(Italy) Kikko Galbiati	P	2
(Italy) Bonaldi Motorsport	33	(Finland) Patrick Kujala	P	3
(Italy) Imperiale Racing	44	(Italy) Vito Postiglione	P	1
(Italy) Imperiale Racing	44	(Italy) Kikko Galbiati	P	1
(Italy) Imperiale Racing	88	(Belgium) Hans Fabri	LC	All
(Netherlands) Johan Kraan Motorsport	54	(Netherlands) Milan Teekens	P	5
(Netherlands) Johan Kraan Motorsport	54	(Netherlands) Maxime Oosten	P	5
(Netherlands) Johan Kraan Motorsport	61	(Netherlands) Max Weering	P	All
(Germany) Attempto Racing	90	(Germany) Holger Harmsen	Am	2, 5
(Germany) Attempto Racing	90	(Germany) Arkin Aka	Am	2, 5
(Netherlands) Van Der Horst Motorsport	98	(Netherlands) Gerard van der Horst	PA	1–2
(Netherlands) Van Der Horst Motorsport	98	(Italy) Loris Spinelli	PA	1–2

Icon	Class
P	Pro Cup
PA	Pro-Am Cup
Am	Am Cup
LC	Lamborghini Cup

== Race results ==
Bold indicates the overall winner.

Round	Circuit	Pole position	Pro winners	Pro/Am winners	Am winners	LC Winners
1	(Italy) Misano World Circuit Marco Simoncelli	(Germany) No. 2 Leipert Motorsport	**(Italy) No. 44 Target Racing**	(Italy) No. 16 VS Racing	(Switzerland) No. 63 Autovitesse	(Czech Republic) No. 22 Micanek Motorsport ACCR
1	(Italy) Misano World Circuit Marco Simoncelli	(Germany) Sebastian Balthasar (Norway) Markus Paverud	**(Mexico) Raúl Guzmán** **(Serbia) Miloš Pavlović**	(Poland) Karol Basz (Poland) Andrzej Lewandowski	(Switzerland) Cedric Leimer (Switzerland) Laurent Jenny	(Germany) Kurt Wagner (Czech Republic) Libor Dvoracek
2	(Italy) Misano World Circuit Marco Simoncelli	(Italy) No. 16 VS Racing	**(Italy) No. 33 Bonaldi Motorsport**	(Italy) No. 16 VS Racing	(Italy) No. 53 Target Racing	(Italy) No. 88 Imperiale Racing
2	(Italy) Misano World Circuit Marco Simoncelli	(Poland) Karol Basz (Poland) Andrzej Lewandowski	**(United Kingdom) Dean Stoneman**	(Poland) Karol Basz (Poland) Andrzej Lewandowski	(Italy) Massimo Mantovani	(Belgium) Hans Fabri
3	(Germany) Nürburgring	(Italy) No. 16 VS Racing	**(Italy) No. 33 Bonaldi Motorsport**	(Italy) No. 16 VS Racing	(Italy) No. 53 Target Racing	(Italy) No. 88 Imperiale Racing
3	(Germany) Nürburgring	(Poland) Karol Basz (Poland) Andrzej Lewandowski	**(United Kingdom) Dean Stoneman** **(Italy) Kikko Galbiati**	(Poland) Karol Basz (Poland) Andrzej Lewandowski	(Italy) Massimo Mantovani	(Belgium) Hans Fabri
4	(Germany) Nürburgring	(Netherlands) No. 98 Van der Horst Motorsport	**(Italy) No. 9 Target Racing**	(Italy) No. 16 VS Racing	(Italy) No. 53 Target Racing	(Austria) No. 29 Konrad Motorsport
4	(Germany) Nürburgring	(Netherlands) Gerard van der Horst (Italy) Loris Spinelli	**(Denmark) Kevin Rossel** **(Italy) Alberto Di Folco**	(Poland) Karol Basz (Poland) Andrzej Lewandowski	(Italy) Massimo Mantovani	(Germany) Martin Lechmann (Germany) Emir Keserovic
5	(Spain) Circuit de Catalunya	(Italy) No. 33 Bonaldi Motorsport	**(Italy) No. 11 Oregon Team**	(Italy) No. 14 Oregon Team	(Germany) No. 21 Leipert Motorsport	(Italy) No. 88 Imperiale Racing
5	(Spain) Circuit de Catalunya	(United Kingdom) Dean Stoneman (Finland) Patrick Kujala	**(France) Dorian Boccolacci** **(Italy) Kevin Gilardoni**	(Brazil) Victor Franzoni (Switzerland) Lorenzo Bontempelli	(Luxembourg) Yury Wagner (Germany) Fidel Leib	(Belgium) Hans Fabri
6	(Spain) Circuit de Catalunya	(Italy) No. 9 Target Racing	**(Italy) No. 11 Oregon Team**	(Italy) No. 16 VS Racing	(Germany) No. 21 Leipert Motorsport	(Italy) No. 88 Imperiale Racing
6	(Spain) Circuit de Catalunya	(Denmark) Kevin Rossel (Italy) Alberto Di Folco	**(France) Dorian Boccolacci** **(Italy) Kevin Gilardoni**	(Poland) Karol Basz (Poland) Andrzej Lewandowski	(Luxembourg) Yury Wagner (Germany) Fidel Leib	(Belgium) Hans Fabri
7	(Belgium) Circuit de Spa-Francorchamps	(Monaco) GSM Racing	**(Italy) No. 11 Oregon Team**	(Italy) No. 16 VS Racing	(Germany) No. 21 Leipert Motorsport	(Austria) No. 27 Konrad Motorsport
7	(Belgium) Circuit de Spa-Francorchamps	(United States) Patrick Liddy (Venezuela) Jonathan Ceccotto	**(Italy) Kevin Gilardoni**	(Poland) Karol Basz (Poland) Andrzej Lewandowski	(Luxembourg) Yury Wagner (Germany) Fidel Leib	(Germany) Matthias Hoffsuemmer (Canada) Ray Calvin
8	(Belgium) Circuit de Spa-Francorchamps	(Italy) No. 16 VS Racing	(Italy) No. 33 Bonaldi Motorsport	**(Italy) No. 6 VS Racing**	(Germany) No. 21 Leipert Motorsport	(Austria) No. 27 Konrad Motorsport
8	(Belgium) Circuit de Spa-Francorchamps	(Poland) Karol Basz (Poland) Andrzej Lewandowski	(United Kingdom) Dean Stoneman	**(Finland) Olli Parhankangas** **(Japan) Yuki Nemoto**	(Luxembourg) Yury Wagner (Germany) Fidel Leib	(Germany) Matthias Hoffsuemmer (Canada) Ray Calvin
9	(France) Circuit Paul Ricard					
10	(France) Circuit Paul Ricard					
