= Mattia Michelotto =

Italian racing driver (born 2003)

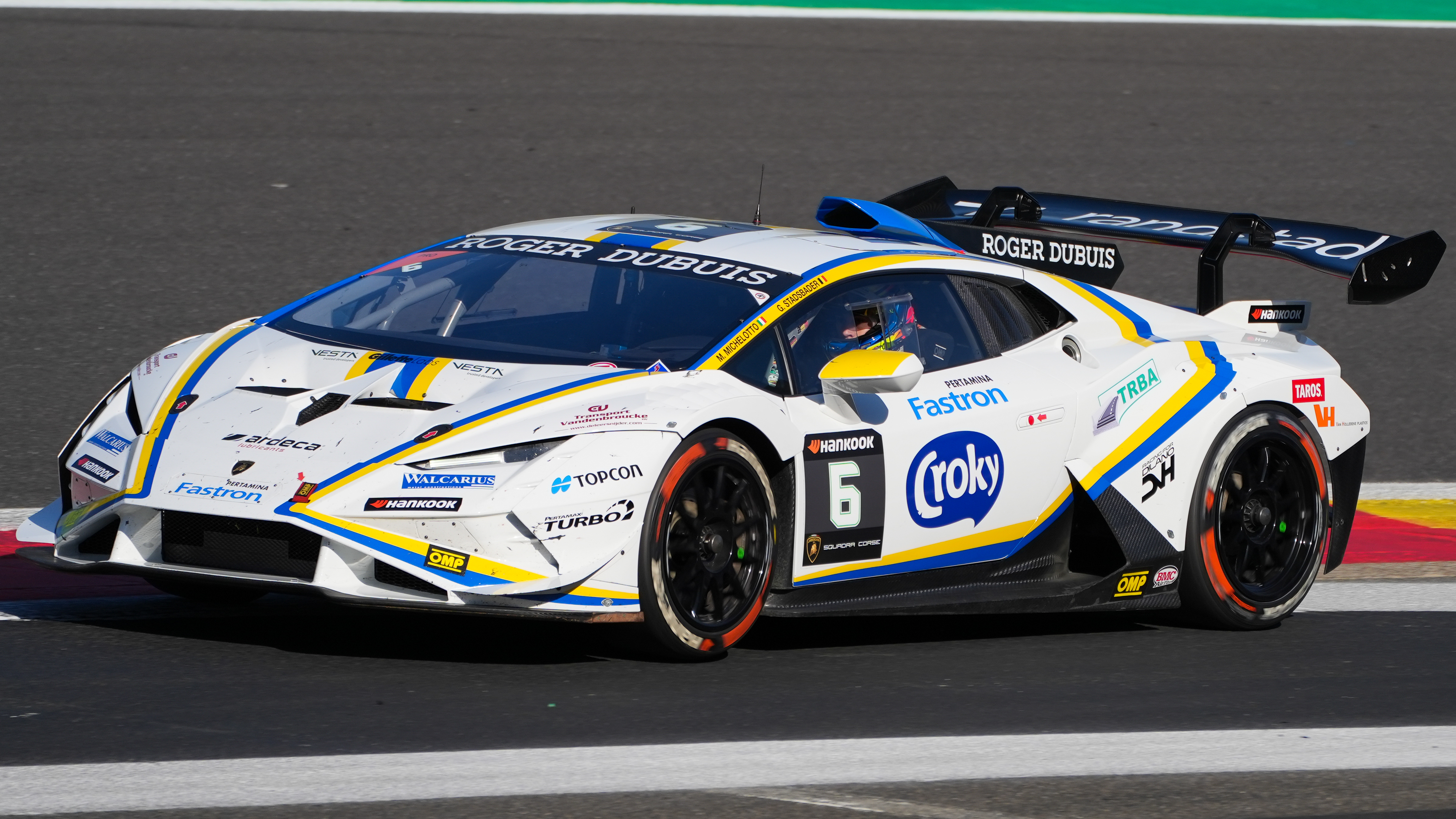
- Michelotto in 2024
- Nationality: (Italy) Italian
- Born: 12 January 2003 (age 23) Villafranca Padovana, Italy
- Categorisation: FIA Silver

Championship titles
- 2025 2020 2019: Italian GT Championship Sprint Cup – GT3 Pro-Am; Italian GT Endurance Championship – GT3 Pro-Am; Italian GT Endurance Championship – GT Light

Mattia Michelotto (born 12 January 2003 in Villafranca Padovana) is an Italian racing driver who last competed in the GT World Challenge Europe Sprint Cup for Vincenzo Sospiri Racing as a Lamborghini factory driver.

Michelotto is a two-time Italian GT class champion, having also won the Lamborghini Super Trofeo World Final in 2021 alongside Karol Basz.

== Career ==
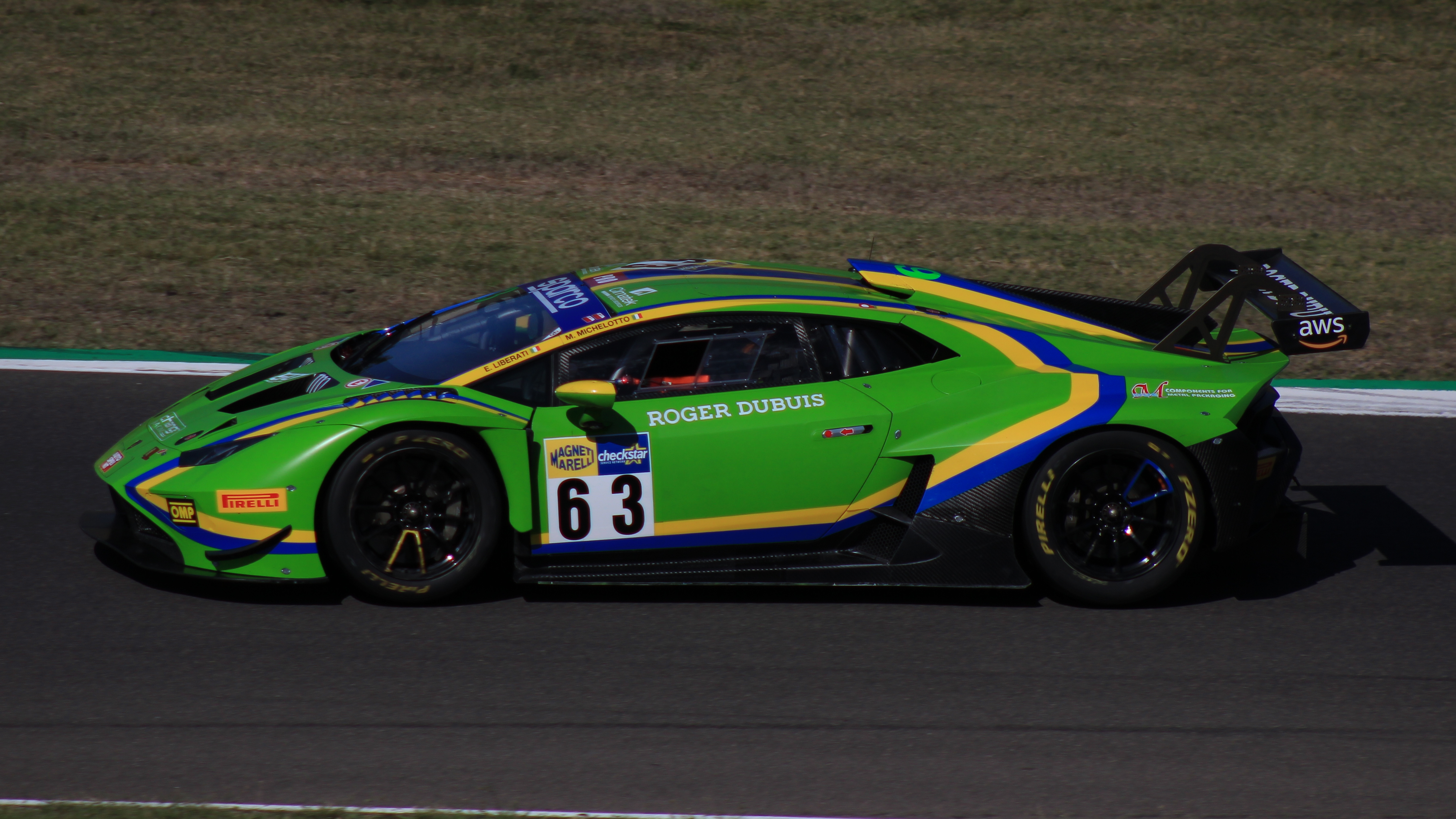
Michelotto at the Mugello round of the 2023 Italian GT Sprint Championship

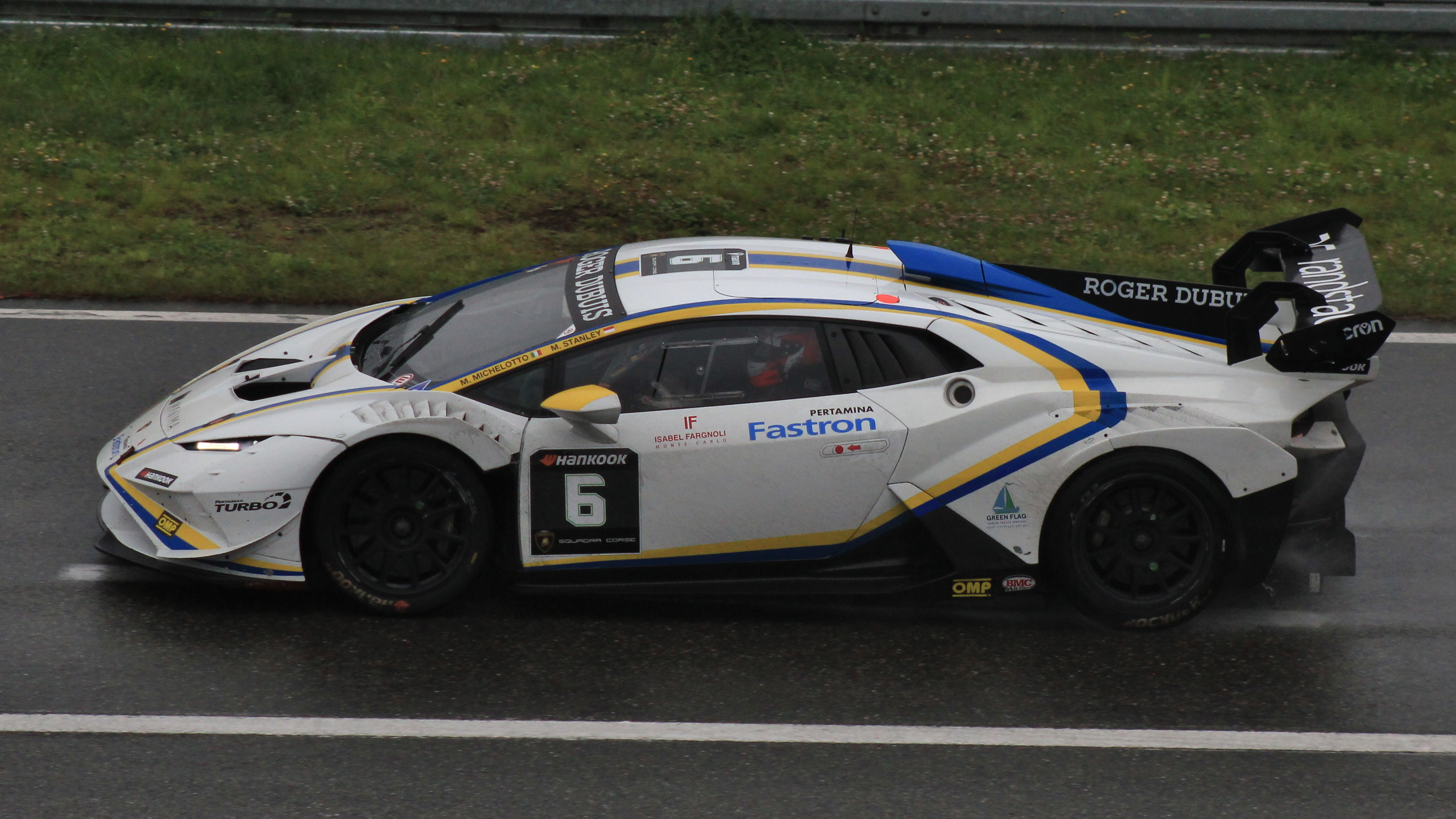
Michelotto at the Nürburgring round of the 2024 Lamborghini Super Trofeo Europe

Michelotto began karting at the age of five, and raced in karts until 2018. During his time in karts, Michelotto won the Easykart International Grand Finals in 2013, the WSK Night Edition, Trofeo delle Industrie and the WSK Final Cup all in 2015 in the Mini class.

After testing Formula 4 machinery, Michelotto stepped up to car racing in 2019, signing with Antonelli Motorsport to race in the GT Light class of both the Italian GT Endurance and Sprint championships, including a one-off round in the GT4 class in the latter at Vallelunga. In the endurance series, Michelotto was on the podium in all four races, winning three of them on his way to the GT Light title at Mugello. In the latter meanwhile, Michelotto won race one at Mugello and finished runner-up in the GT Light standings.

In 2020, Michelotto stayed in both Italian GT championships, albeit stepping up to GT3 Pro-Am by joining Easy Race alongside Matteo Greco and Sean Hudspeth. In the endurance championship, Michelotto took class wins at Imola and Monza en route to the GT3 Pro-Am title. In the sprint championship, Michelotto won in his class in race two at the season-opening Misano round and race one at the season-ending Vallelunga round to finish runner-up in the GT3 Pro-Am standings.

Joining the Lamborghini Young Driver Programme for 2021, Michelotto joined VS Racing to compete in the Lamborghini Super Trofeo Europe alongside Luis Michael Dörrbecker. In his first season in the series, Michelotto finished on the podium at Le Castellet and Misano, on their way to ninth in points. Before the year ended, Michelotto won both races of the Super Trofeo World Finals at Misano alongside Karol Basz, en route to the title at the end of the weekend.

Michelotto returned to Vincenzo Sospiri Racing in 2022, albeit only competing full-time in the Italian GT Endurance Championship, whilst also retaining his Lamborghini junior status. Racing alongside Karol Basz and Benjamín Hites, the trio won in the opening round at Pergusa, but after finishing second at Mugello, they didn't score a podium in the final two races of the season, relegating them to fourth in the overall standings. During 2022, Michelotto also made his GT World Challenge Europe Endurance Cup at that year's 24 Hours of Spa for Vincenzo Sospiri Racing.

Staying for Vincenzo Sospiri Racing for the third year in a row, Michelotto raced full-time in both Lamborghini Super Trofeo Europe and the 2023 Italian GT Sprint Championship. In the former, Michelotto won the season-opening round at Le Castellet, before taking further wins at Spa, Nürburgring and Vallelunga, on his way to runner-up honours behind Brendon Leitch. In the latter, Michelotto took his first win of the season in the penultimate round of the season at Mugello in race two, before winning the season-ending race two at Imola to finish runner-up in the overall GT3 standings. During 2023, Michelotto made his debut in the GT World Challenge Europe Sprint Cup at the second round of the season at Misano.

Extending his partnership with Vincenzo Sospiri Racing in 2024 as a Professional driver for Lamborghini, Michelotto returned to Lamborghini Super Trofeo Europe, whilst also competing full-time in the Italian GT Sprint Championship and also racing part-time in the GT3 Pro-Am class of the Italian GT Endurance Championship. In Super Trofeo Europe, Michelotto won at Le Mans and Barcelona to finish fourth in points in fourth season in the series. In Italian GT, Michelotto finished third in the sprint standings after taking two wins at Misano and Imola, whilst in the endurance series, Michelotto won in class at the season-ending Monza round to finish runner-up in the Pro-Am points. During 2024, Michelotto returned to the 24 Hours of Spa, racing in the Bronze Cup for Barwell Motorsport. In the race, Michelotto led in class until the latter stages, during which the Italian suffered a puncture and eventually finished third in class.

In 2025, Michelotto returned to Vincenzo Sospiri Racing for a dual campaign in both the Endurance and Sprint Cups of the Italian GT Championship. In the former, Michelotto scored a lone GT3 Pro-Am win at Mugello to end the year seventh in points. In the latter, Michelotto took class wins at Mugello, Imola and Monza to secure the GT3 Pro-Am title at season's end. Alongside his commitments in Italian GT, Michelotto also raced part-time with the same team in the GT World Challenge Europe Endurance Cup, scoring a best result of ninth at Monza.

In early 2026, Michelotto joined the Lamborghini Squadra Corse factory roster, as well as continuing with VSR for his maiden full-time campaign in the GT World Challenge Europe Sprint Cup. In his maiden full season in GTWC competition, Michelotto took a Gold Cup win at Barcelona by finishing fourth overall, as well as scoring two other class podiums at Brands Hatch and Zandvoort to end the season fifth in class. In parallel, Michelotto also raced for VSR in the Italian GT Championship Endurance and Sprint Cups, most notably finishing runner-up in the former with a win at Monza.

== Karting record ==
=== Karting career summary ===
Season	Series	Team	Position
2010	EASYKART International Grand Finals - Easykart 60		NC
2011	EASYKART International Grand Finals - Easykart 60		15th
2012	Trofeo Italiano EASYKART - 60cc		9th
2012	EASYKART International Grand Finals - Easykart 60	Emilia Kart	13th
2013	Trofeo Italiano EASYKART - Easykart 60		4th
2013	EASYKART International Grand Finals - Easykart 60	Rubicone Corse	1st
2013	Italian Karting Championship - 60 Mini		37th
2013	WSK Final Cup - 60 Mini	Michelotto Mauro	34th
2014	WSK Champions Cup - 60 Mini	Volonnino Racing; Michelotto Mauro (Note: Michelotto competed for Volonnino Racing in Round 1 and ran as for his father in round 2.)	25th
2014	WSK Super Master Series - 60 Mini	Giugliano Kart	30th
2014	WSK Final Cup - 60 Mini	Giugliano Kart	6th
2014	Italian Karting Championship - 60 Mini		4th
2014	ROK Cup International Final - Mini Rok		5th
2015	VEGA International Winter Trophy - 60 Mini	Michelotto Mauro	3rd
2015	WSK Champions Cup - 60 Mini	Giugliano Kart	25th
2015	South Garda Winter Cup - Mini Rok	Giugliano Kart	23rd
2015	WSK Gold Cup - 60 Mini	Giugliano Kart	7th
2015	WSK Super Master Series - 60 Mini	Giugliano Kart	5th
2015	WSK Night Edition - 60 Mini	Giugliano Kart	1st
2015	Andrea Margutti Trophy - 60 Mini	Giugliano Kart	6th
2015	WSK Final Cup - 60 Mini	Giugliano Kart	1st
2015	Trofeo Delle Industrie - Mini		1st
2015	Italian Karting Championship - 60 Mini		2nd
2015	ROK Cup International Final - Mini Rok		3rd
2015	SKUSA SuperNationals - TaG Cadet		40th
2016	WSK Champions Cup - OKJ	Giugliano Kart	NC
2016	South Garda Winter Cup - OKJ	Giugliano Kart	12th
2016	WSK Super Master Series - OKJ (Note: Michelotto competed for Giugliano Kart in Rounds 1–3 and ran as for Energy Corse in round 4.)	Giugliano Kart	46th
2016	Andrea Margutti Trophy - OKJ	Giugliano Kart	9th
2016	Karting European Championship - OKJ	Energy Corse	62nd
2016	German Karting Championship - OKJ	Energy Corse	63rd
2016	WSK Final Cup - OKJ	CRG	9th
2016	Karting World Championship - OKJ	CRG	NC
2016	Trofeo Delle Industrie - Junior		14th
2017	WSK Champions Cup - OKJ	Chiesa Corse	17th
2017	South Garda Winter Cup - OKJ	Chiesa Corse	15th
2017	WSK Super Master Series - OKJ	Chiesa Corse	2nd
2017	Andrea Margutti Trophy - OKJ	Chiesa Corse	2nd
2017	Karting European Championship - OKJ	Chiesa Corse	8th
2017	IAME International Final - X30 Junior	Chiesa Corse	23rd
2017	Karting World Championship - OKJ	Chiesa Corse	NC
2017	WSK Final Cup - OKJ	Chiesa Corse	7th
2017	German Karting Championship - OKJ		7th
2017	German Karting Championship - OK		20th
2017	Trofeo Delle Industrie - OK		11th
2018	WSK Super Master Series - OK	KR Motorsport	21st
2018	South Garda Winter Cup - OK	KR Motorsport	34th
2018	Karting European Championship - OK	KR Motorsport	12th
2018	WSK Open Cup - OK	KR Motorsport	4th
2018	Karting World Championship - OK	KR Motorsport	NC

== Racing record ==
=== Racing career summary ===
Season	Series	Team	Races	Wins	Poles	F/Laps	Podiums	Points	Position
2019	Italian GT Endurance Championship – GT Light	Antonelli Motorsport	4	3	3	0	4	60	**1st**
2019	Italian GT Sprint Championship – GT Light	Antonelli Motorsport	6	1	0	1	6	92	**2nd**
2019	Italian GT Sprint Championship – GT4	Antonelli Motorsport	2	0	0	0	0	5	14th
2020	Italian GT Endurance Championship – GT3 Pro-Am	Easy Race	4	2	0	0	4	55	**1st**
2020	Italian GT Sprint Championship – GT3 Pro-Am	Easy Race	8	2	0	0	6	94	**2nd**
2021	Lamborghini Super Trofeo Europe – Pro	Vincenzo Sospiri Racing	10	0	0	0	1	45	9th
2022	Italian GT Endurance Championship – GT3	Vincenzo Sospiri Racing	4	1	0	0	2	41	4th
2022	GT World Challenge Europe Endurance Cup – Silver Cup	Vincenzo Sospiri Racing	1	0	0	0	0	16	20th
2023	Lamborghini Super Trofeo Europe – Pro	Vincenzo Sospiri Racing	12	5	4	6	8	76.5	**2nd**
2023	Lamborghini Super Trofeo World Final – Pro	Vincenzo Sospiri Racing	2	0	0	1	0	0	NC
2023	Italian GT Sprint Championship – GT3	Vincenzo Sospiri Racing	8	2	1	1	6	98	**2nd**
2023	GT World Challenge Europe Sprint Cup – Silver Cup	Vincenzo Sospiri Racing	2	0	0	0	1	12	15th
2024	Lamborghini Super Trofeo Europe – Pro	Vincenzo Sospiri Racing	12	2	0	1	3	69.5	4th
2024	Lamborghini Super Trofeo World Final – Pro	Vincenzo Sospiri Racing	2	0	0	0	0	0	NC
2024	Italian GT Sprint Championship – GT3	Vincenzo Sospiri Racing	7	2	1	1	3	76	**3rd**
2024	Italian GT Endurance Championship – GT3 Pro-Am	Vincenzo Sospiri Racing	3	1	0	3	3	68	**2nd**
2024	GT World Challenge Europe Endurance Cup – Bronze Cup	Barwell Motorsport	1	0	0	0	1	23	17th
2025	Italian GT Championship Endurance Cup – GT3 Pro-Am	Vincenzo Sospiri Racing	4	1	0	0	1	42	7th
2025	Italian GT Championship Sprint Cup – GT3 Pro-Am	Vincenzo Sospiri Racing	8	3	2	1	5	107	**1st**
2025	GT World Challenge Europe Endurance Cup	Vincenzo Sospiri Racing	3	0	0	0	0	2	26th
2025	GT World Challenge Europe Endurance Cup – Silver	Vincenzo Sospiri Racing	2	0	0	0	0	0	NC
2026	GT Winter Series – GT3	VSR	6	3	0	0	5	104	4th
2026	GT World Challenge Europe Sprint Cup	VSR	10	0	0	0	0	8.5	23rd
2026	GT World Challenge Europe Sprint Cup – Gold	VSR	10	1	0	0	2	71.5	5th
2026	Italian GT Championship Endurance Cup – GT3	VSR	4	1	0	0	1	58	**2nd**
2026	Italian GT Championship Sprint Cup – GT3	VSR	8	0	0	0	0	13	15th

=== Complete GT World Challenge Europe results ===
==== GT World Challenge Europe Endurance Cup ====
(Races in bold indicate pole position) (Races in italics indicate fastest lap)

Year	Team	Car	Class	1	2	3	4	5	6	7	Pos.	Points
2022	Vincenzo Sospiri Racing	Lamborghini Huracán GT3 Evo	Silver	IMO	LEC	SPA; 6H; 37	SPA; 12H; 30	SPA; 24H; 21	HOC	CAT	20th	16
2024	Barwell Motorsport	Lamborghini Huracán GT3 Evo 2	Bronze	LEC	SPA; 6H; 34	SPA; 12H; 18	SPA; 24H; 14	NÜR	MNZ	JED	17th	23
2025	VSR	Lamborghini Huracán GT3 Evo 2	Pro	LEC	MNZ; 9						26th	2
2025	VSR	Lamborghini Huracán GT3 Evo 2	Silver			SPA; 6H; 70†	SPA; 12H; 70†	SPA; 24H; Ret	NÜR	CAT; 42	NC	0

==== GT World Challenge Europe Sprint Cup ====
Year	Team	Car	Class	1	2	3	4	5	6	7	8	9	10	Pos.	Points
2023	VSR	Lamborghini Huracán GT3 Evo 2	Silver	BRH; 1	BRH; 2	MIS; 1 Ret	MIS; 2; 13	HOC; 1	HOC; 2	VAL; 1	VAL; 2	ZAN; 1	ZAN; 2	15th	12
2026	VSR	Lamborghini Temerario GT3	Gold	BRH; 1; 28	BRH; 2; 23	MIS; 1; 36	MIS; 2; 12	MAG; 1; 22	MAG; 2 Ret	ZAN; 1; 10	ZAN; 2; 17	CAT; 1; 15	CAT; 2; 4	5th	71.5
