= 2021 Lamborghini Super Trofeo Europe =

European racing series

The 2021 Lamborghini Super Trofeo Europe was the thirteenth season of the Lamborghini Super Trofeo Europe. The calendar consisted of six rounds. Every event featured two 50 Minute races. 2021 marked the third season of the Lamborghini Huracán Super Trofeo Evo. There can be two drivers or one driver per car. A car is entered in one of four categories: Pro, Pro-Am, Am and Lamborghini Cup (LC).

== Calendar ==
Rnd.	Circuit	Date	Supporting
1	Autodromo Nazionale di Monza, Monza, Italy	16-18 April	GT World Challenge Europe Endurance Cup
2	Circuit Paul Ricard, Le Castellet, France	28-30 May	GT World Challenge Europe Endurance Cup
3	Circuit Zandvoort, Zandvoort, Netherlands	18-20 June	GT World Challenge Europe Sprint Cup
4	Circuit de Spa-Francorchamps, Stavelot, Belgium	29 July-1 August	GT World Challenge Europe Endurance Cup
5	Nürburgring, Nürburg, Germany	3-5 September	GT World Challenge Europe Endurance Cup
6	Misano World Circuit Marco Simoncelli, Misano Adriatico, Italy	28-29 October	Lamborghini Super Trofeo World Final

== Entry list ==
All teams use the Lamborghini Huracán Super Trofeo Evo.

Team	No.	Drivers	Class	Rounds
(Germany) Leipert Motorsport	2	(Germany) Sebastian Balthasar	P	1–3
(Germany) Leipert Motorsport	2	(Denmark) Noah Watt	P	1–3
(Germany) Leipert Motorsport	10	(Canada) Ray Calvin	Am	1–3
(Germany) Leipert Motorsport	21	(Luxembourg) Gabriel Rindone	Am	2–3
(Germany) Leipert Motorsport	21	(Germany) Matthias Hoffsümmer	Am	TBA
(Germany) Leipert Motorsport	51	(United Kingdom) Dan Wells	P	1–3
(Germany) Leipert Motorsport	51	(United States) Oscar Lee	P	1–3
(Germany) Leipert Motorsport	70	(United States) Gerhard Watzinger	LC	1–3
(Italy) Bonaldi Motorsport	3	(Serbia) Milos Pavlovic	PA	1–3
(Italy) Bonaldi Motorsport	3	(Serbia) Petar Matic	PA	1–3
(Italy) Bonaldi Motorsport	32	(Italy) Sacha Tempesta	P	1
(Italy) Bonaldi Motorsport	32	(Italy) Simone Iacone	P	1
(Italy) Bonaldi Motorsport	33	(Netherlands) Daan Pijl	P	1–3
(Italy) Bonaldi Motorsport	33	(Brazil) Erik Mayrink	P	1–2
(Italy) Bonaldi Motorsport	33	(Netherlands) Danny Kroes	P	3
(Italy) Bonaldi Motorsport	54	(Netherlands) Milan Teekens	P	2–3
(Italy) Bonaldi Motorsport	54	(Netherlands) Maxime Oosten	P	2–3
(Belgium) Boutsen Ginion Racing	4	(France) Claude-Yves Gosselin	Am	1–3
(Belgium) Boutsen Ginion Racing	4	(France) Renaud Kuppens	Am	1–2
(Belgium) Boutsen Ginion Racing	4	(France) Marc Rostan	Am	3
(Belgium) Boutsen Ginion Racing	12	(France) Pierre Felgioni	LC	1–3
(Belgium) Boutsen Ginion Racing	12	(France) Daniel Waszkzinski	LC	1–3
GT3 Poland	5	(Poland) Artur Hawryluc	P	2
GT3 Poland	5	(Poland) Rafal Mikrut	P	2
(Italy) Vincenzo Sospiri Racing	6	(Mexico) Michael Dörrbecker	P	1–3
(Italy) Vincenzo Sospiri Racing	6	(Italy) Mattia Michelotto	P	1–3
(Italy) Vincenzo Sospiri Racing	16	(Poland) Karol Basz	PA	1–3
(Italy) Vincenzo Sospiri Racing	16	(Poland) Andrzej Lewandowski	PA	1–3
(Italy) Vincenzo Sospiri Racing	23	(Malaysia) Prabakaran Kumar	LC	1–3
(Monaco) GSM Racing	7	(Denmark) Kevin Rossel	P	1–3
(Monaco) GSM Racing	7	(Venezuela) Jonathan Cecotto	P	1–3
(Monaco) GSM Racing	65	(United Kingdom) JM Littman	Am	1–3
(Monaco) GSM Racing	65	(Switzerland) Antoine Bottiroli	Am	
(China) Rexal FFF Racing Team	8	(Italy) Donovan Privitelio	LC	1–3
(China) Rexal FFF Racing Team	8	(Italy) Luciano Privitelio	LC	1–3
(Italy) Target Racing	9	(Italy) Kikko Galbiati	PA	3
(Italy) Target Racing	9	(Portugal) Miguel Ramos	PA	3
(Italy) Target Racing	15	(Sri Lanka) Dilantha Malagamuwa	Am	1
(Italy) Target Racing	15	(Sri Lanka) Silva Ashan Eranga	Am	1
(Italy) Target Racing	41	(Mexico) Raúl Guzmán	P	1–3
(Italy) Target Racing	41	(Netherlands) Glenn van Berlo	P	1–3
(Italy) Target Racing	99	(Italy) Andrea Cola	PA	1–3
(Italy) Target Racing	99	(Russia) Dmitry Gvazava	PA	1–3
(Italy) Oregon Team	11	(Italy) Kevin Gilardoni	P	1–3
(Italy) Oregon Team	11	(Italy) Leonardo Pulcini	P	1–3
(Italy) Oregon Team	27	(Italy) Massimo Ciglia	PA	1–3
(Italy) Oregon Team	27	(Spain) Guillem Pujeu Beya	PA	1–3
(Czech Republic) Micanek Motorsport	22	(Czech Republic) Libor Dvoracek	LC	1
(Czech Republic) Micanek Motorsport	22	(Germany) Kurt Wagner	LC	1
(Czech Republic) Micanek Motorsport	66	(Czech Republic) Bronek Formanek	PA	1–3
(Czech Republic) Micanek Motorsport	66	(Czech Republic) Josef Zaruba	PA	1–3
(Germany) AKF Motorsport	24	(Germany) Oliver Freymuth	Am	1–3
(Italy) Imperiale Racing	44	(Italy) Alberto Di Folco	P	1
(Italy) Imperiale Racing	88	(Netherlands) Hans Fabri	LC	1–3
(Netherlands) Johan Kraan Motorsport	54	(Netherlands) Milan Teekens	P	1
(Netherlands) Johan Kraan Motorsport	54	(Netherlands) Maxime Oosten	P	1
(Netherlands) Johan Kraan Motorsport	61	(Netherlands) Max Weering	P	1–3
(Switzerland) Autovitessè	63	(Switzerland) Cedric Leimer	Am	1–2
(Switzerland) Autovitessè	63	(Switzerland) Jenny Laurent	Am	1–2
(Germany) Attempto Racing	90	(Germany) Holger Harmsen	Am	1–2
(Germany) Attempto Racing	90	(Germany) Arkin Aka	Am	1
(Italy) Automobile Tricolore	96	(Italy) Raffaele Giannoni	Am	1–2
Entrylists:

Icon	Class
P	Pro Cup
PA	Pro-Am Cup
Am	Am Cup
LC	Lamborghini Cup

== Race results ==
Bold indicates the overall winner.

Round		Circuit	Pole position	Pro winners	Pro-Am winners	Am winners	LC Winners
1	R1	(Italy) Autodromo Nazionale di Monza	(Italy) No. 16 Vincenzo Sospiri Racing	**(Netherlands) No. 61 Johan Kraan Motorsport**	(Italy) No. 99 Target Racing	(Belgium) No. 4 Boutsen Ginion Racing	(Belgium) No. 12 Boutsen Ginion Racing
1	R1	(Italy) Autodromo Nazionale di Monza	(Poland) Karol Basz (Poland) Andrzej Lewandowski	**(Netherlands) Max Weering**	(Italy) Andrea Cola (Russia) Dmitry Gvazava	(France) Claude-Yves Gosselin (France) Renaud Kuppens	(France) Pierre Felgioni (France) Daniel Waszkzinski
1	R2	(Italy) Autodromo Nazionale di Monza	(Italy) No. 44 Imperiale Racing	**(Italy) No. 44 Imperiale Racing**	(Italy) No. 16 Vincenzo Sospiri Racing	(Italy) No. 96 Automobile Tricolore	(Italy) No. 88 Imperiale Racing
1	R2	(Italy) Autodromo Nazionale di Monza	(Italy) Alberto Di Folco	**(Italy) Alberto Di Folco**	(Poland) Karol Basz (Poland) Andrzej Lewandowski	(Italy) Raffaele Giannoni	(Netherlands) Hans Fabri
2	R1	(France) Circuit Paul Ricard	(Italy) No. 16 Vincenzo Sospiri Racing	**(Italy) No. 11 Oregon Team**	(Italy) No. 16 Vincenzo Sospiri Racing	(Germany) No. 21 Leipert Motorsport	(Italy) No. 88 Imperiale Racing
2	R1	(France) Circuit Paul Ricard	(Poland) Karol Basz (Poland) Andrzej Lewandowski	**(Italy) Kevin Gilardoni** **(Italy) Leonardo Pulcini**	(Poland) Karol Basz (Poland) Andrzej Lewandowski	(Luxembourg) Gabriel Rindone	(Netherlands) Hans Fabri
2	R2	(France) Circuit Paul Ricard	(Germany) No. 2 Leipert Motorsport	**(Italy) No. 11 Oregon Team**	(Italy) No. 16 Vincenzo Sospiri Racing	(Italy) No. 96 Automobile Tricolore	(China) No. 8 Rexal FFF Racing Team
2	R2	(France) Circuit Paul Ricard	(Germany) Sebastian Balthasar (Denmark) Noah Watt	**(Italy) Kevin Gilardoni** **(Italy) Leonardo Pulcini**	(Poland) Karol Basz (Poland) Andrzej Lewandowski	(Italy) Raffaele Giannoni	(Italy) Donovan Privitelio (Italy) Luciano Privitelio
3	R1	(Netherlands) Circuit Zandvoort	(Monaco) No.7 GSM Racing	(Germany) **No.2 Leipert Motorsport**	(Italy) No.9 Target Racing	(Germany) No.10 Leipert Motorsport	(Belgium) No. 12 Boutsen Ginion Racing
3	R1	(Netherlands) Circuit Zandvoort	(Denmark) Kevin Rossel (Venezuela) Jonathan Cecotto	(Germany) **Sebastian Balthasar** (Denmark) **Noah Watt**	(Italy) Kikko Galbiati (Portugal) Miguel Ramos	(Canada) Ray Calvin	(France) Pierre Felgioni (France) Daniel Waszkzinski
3	R2	(Netherlands) Circuit Zandvoort	(Italy) No.3 Bonaldi Motorsport	**(Italy) No. 11 Oregon Team**	(Italy) No. 16 Vincenzo Sospiri Racing	(Germany) No.10 Leipert Motorsport	(Italy) No. 88 Imperiale Racing
3	R2	(Netherlands) Circuit Zandvoort	(Serbia) Milos Pavlovic (Serbia) Petar Matic	**(Italy) Kevin Gilardoni** **(Italy) Leonardo Pulcini**	(Poland) Karol Basz (Poland) Andrzej Lewandowski	(Canada) Ray Calvin	(Netherlands) Hans Fabri
4	R1	(Belgium) Circuit de Spa-Francorchamps					
4	R2	(Belgium) Circuit de Spa-Francorchamps					
5	R1	(Germany) Nürburgring					
5	R2	(Germany) Nürburgring					
6	R1	(Italy) Misano World Circuit Marco Simoncelli					
6	R2	(Italy) Misano World Circuit Marco Simoncelli					
Results:

== See also ==
- 2021 GT World Challenge Europe Endurance Cup
- 2021 GT World Challenge Europe Sprint Cup
