= 2023 Lamborghini Super Trofeo Europe =

The 2023 Lamborghini Super Trofeo Europe was the fifteenth season of the Lamborghini Super Trofeo Europe. The season began on 3 June at Le Castellet and concluded on 17 November with the World Final at Vallelunga, featuring six rounds.

== Calendar ==
The preliminary calendar was released on 5 November 2022, featuring six rounds. On April 11, the European Le Mans Series promoters announced that the Imola round would be Postponed. On May 4 Lamborghini announced that they will hold a standalone event one week before the World Finals in Vallelunga.

Rnd.	Circuit	Date	Supporting
1	Circuit Paul Ricard, Le Castellet, France	3–4 June	GT World Challenge Europe Endurance Cup
2	Circuit de Spa-Francorchamps, Stavelot, Belgium	29 June–1 July	GT World Challenge Europe Endurance Cup
3	Nürburgring, Nürburg, Germany	28–30 July	GT World Challenge Europe Endurance Cup
4	(Spain) Circuit Ricardo Tormo, Cheste	16–17 September	GT World Challenge Europe Sprint Cup
5	Vallelunga Circuit, Campagnano di Roma, Italy	11–12 November	Lamborghini Super Trofeo World Final
WF	Vallelunga Circuit, Campagnano di Roma, Italy	16–17 November	Lamborghini Super Trofeo World Final

=== Cancelled ===
Rnd.	Circuit	Date	Supporting
1	Imola Circuit, Imola, Italy	5–7 May	European Le Mans Series

== Entry list ==
All teams use the Lamborghini Huracán Super Trofeo Evo2.

Team	No.	Drivers	Class	Rounds
(Belgium) Boutsen VDS	2	(Belgium) Pierre Feligioni	Am	All
(Belgium) Boutsen VDS	2	(Belgium) Renaud Kuppens	Am	All
(Belgium) Boutsen VDS	12	(France) Thomas Laurent	P	1–2
(Belgium) Boutsen VDS	18	(France) Elie Dubelly	Am	All
(Belgium) Boutsen VDS	18	(Saudi Arabia) Karim Ojjeh	Am	1–4
(Belgium) Boutsen VDS	18	(United States) Roee Meyuhas	Am	5–6
(Italy) Bonaldi Motorsport	3	(Serbia) Miloš Pavlović	PA	1, 6
(Italy) Bonaldi Motorsport	3	(Germany) Michael Fischbaum	PA	1, 6
(Italy) Bonaldi Motorsport	32	(Italy) Paolo Leonardo Biglieri	Am	All
(Italy) Bonaldi Motorsport	32	(Serbia) Peter Matic	Am	All
(Italy) Rebelleo by Bonaldi Motorsport	33	(United Kingdom) Abbie Eaton	P	All
(Italy) Rebelleo by Bonaldi Motorsport	33	(Netherlands) Daan Pijl	P	All
(Italy) Iron Lynx	4	(Belgium) Claude-Yves Gosselin (Note: Gosselin is a French driver competing under a Belgian license.)	Am	All
(Italy) Iron Lynx	4	(France) Marc Rostan	Am	1–4, 6
(Italy) Iron Lynx	8	(San Marino) Luciano Privitelio	LC	All
(Italy) Iron Lynx	8	(France) Donovan Privitelio	LC	All
(Italy) Iron Lynx	10	(Portugal) Rodrigo Testa	P	All
(Italy) Iron Lynx	10	(Belgium) Ugo de Wilde	P	All
(Italy) Iron Lynx	38	(Malaysia) Kumar Prabakaran	LC	1–2
(Italy) Iron Lynx	78	(San Marino) Emanuele Zonzini	PA	All
(Italy) Iron Lynx	78	(San Marino) Emanuel Colombini	PA	All
(Italy) Iron Lynx	89	(Netherlands) Nigel Schoonderwoerd	PA	All
(Italy) Iron Lynx	89	(Netherlands) Yelmer Buurman	PA	All
GT3 Poland	5	(Poland) Grzegorz Moczulski	Am	All
GT3 Poland	5	(Poland) Adrian Lewandowski	Am	All
GT3 Poland	55	(Poland) Mariusz Miekos	PA	1–4
GT3 Poland	55	(Poland) Bartosz Groszek	PA	1–4
GT3 Poland	90	(Germany) Holger Harmsen	Am	All
(Italy) Vincenzo Sospiri Racing	6	(Italy) Mattia Michelotto	P	All
(Italy) Vincenzo Sospiri Racing	6	(Belgium) Gilles Stadsbader	P	All
(Italy) Vincenzo Sospiri Racing	16	(Poland) Andrzej Lewandowski	PA	1–2, 4–6
(Italy) Vincenzo Sospiri Racing	16	(Italy) Loris Spinelli	PA	1–2, 5–6
(Italy) Vincenzo Sospiri Racing	16	(Israel) Artem Petrov	PA	4
(Italy) Vincenzo Sospiri Racing	60	(Italy) Giovanni Anapoli	Am	All
(Italy) Vincenzo Sospiri Racing	60	(Italy) Piergiacomo Randazzo	Am	All
(Italy) Vincenzo Sospiri Racing	95	(Norway) Marcus Paverud	PA	5
(Italy) Vincenzo Sospiri Racing	95	(Italy) Ignazio Zanon	PA	5
(Italy) Vincenzo Sospiri Racing	95	(Israel) Artem Petrov	PA	6
(France) Arkadia Racing	7	(France) Lucas Valkre	P	1–5
(France) Arkadia Racing	7	(France) Hugo Condé	P	1–3
(France) Arkadia Racing	7	(France) Milane Petelet	P	4
(France) Arkadia Racing	7	(France) Joran Leneutre	P	5
(France) Arkadia Racing	13	(France) Edgar Maloigne	PA	All
(France) Arkadia Racing	13	(France) Stéphan Guerin	PA	All
(Italy) Target Racing	9	(Sweden) Oliver Söderström	P	1–4, 6
(Italy) Target Racing	9	(Denmark) Largim Ali	P	1–4, 6
(Italy) Target Racing	64	(Greece) Antonios Vossos	Am	1–4
(Italy) Target Racing	81	(Hong Kong) Alex Au	PA	All
(Italy) Target Racing	81	(Denmark) Frederik Schandorff	PA	1–3, 5–6
(Italy) Target Racing	81	(Finland) Patrick Kujala	PA	4
(Germany) Lamborghini Stuttgart by Target Racing	15	(Japan) Douglas Bolger	PA	1–3, 5–6
(Germany) Lamborghini Stuttgart by Target Racing	15	(Sri Lanka) Dilantha Malagamuwa	PA	1–3
(Germany) Lamborghini Stuttgart by Target Racing	15	(United Kingdom) Robert Greenwood	PA	5–6
(Germany) Lamborghini Stuttgart by Target Racing	15	(Japan) Douglas Bolger	P	4
(Italy) Oregon Team	11	(Italy) Filippo Berto	P	All
(Italy) Oregon Team	11	(Italy) Alessandro Mainetti	P	All
(Italy) Oregon Team	14	(Italy) Enrico Bettera	PA	All
(Italy) Oregon Team	14	(Italy) Lorenzo Pegoraro	PA	All
(Italy) Oregon Team	44	(Brazil) Pedro Ebrahim	P	All
(Italy) Oregon Team	44	(Spain) Guillem Pujeu Beya	P	All
(Italy) Oregon Team	61	(Germany) Sebastian Balthasar	P	All
(Italy) Oregon Team	61	(Italy) Marzio Moretti	P	All
(Belgium) BDR Competition by Grupo Prom	17	(Belgium) Serge Doms	LC	All
(Belgium) BDR Competition by Grupo Prom	28	(France) Amaury Bonduel (Note: Bonduel is a Belgian driver competing under a French license.)	P	All
(Belgium) BDR Competition by Grupo Prom	77	(Mexico) Alfredo Hernandez Ortega	LC	1–2, 4–6
(Netherlands) HBR Motorsport	20	(Netherlands) Robert van den Berg	LC	1–3, 5–6
(Netherlands) HBR Motorsport	20	(Netherlands) Benjamin van den Berg	LC	1–3, 5–6
(Germany) Leipert Motorsport	21	(Italy) Gabriel Rindone	Am	All
(Germany) Leipert Motorsport	65	(Germany) Jürgen Krebs	LC	1, 3–6
(Germany) Leipert Motorsport	65	(Malaysia) Melvin Moh	P	2
(Germany) Leipert Motorsport	65	(China) Han Songting	P	2
(Germany) Leipert Motorsport	86	(New Zealand) Brendon Leitch	P	All
(Germany) Leipert Motorsport	88	(United States) Jean-Francois Brunot	Am	All
(Germany) Leipert Motorsport	88	(China) Kerong Li	Am	1–3, 5–6
(Germany) Leipert Motorsport	99	(Denmark) Patrik Matthiesen	P	All
(Germany) Leipert Motorsport	99	(Luxembourg) Yuri Wagner	P	1–5
(Germany) Leipert Motorsport	99	(Spain) Marc de Fulgencio	P	6
(Czech Republic) Micanek Motorsport ACCR Team powered by Buggyra	22	(Czech Republic) Libor Dvoracek	LC	All
(Czech Republic) Micanek Motorsport ACCR Team powered by Buggyra	22	(Germany) Kurt Wagner	LC	All
(Czech Republic) Micanek Motorsport ACCR Team powered by Buggyra	66	(Czech Republic) Bronek Formanek	PA	All
(Czech Republic) Micanek Motorsport ACCR Team powered by Buggyra	66	(Poland) Karol Basz	PA	All
(Belgium) Totaalplan Racing	23	(Belgium) Cedric Wauters	P	2
(Belgium) Totaalplan Racing	23	(Belgium) Kenneth Linthout	LC	5–6
(Belgium) Totaalplan Racing	23	(Belgium) Mario Martlé	LC	5–6
(Germany) AKF Motorsport	24	(Germany) Oliver Freymuth	Am	5–6
(Germany) AKF Motorsport	42	(Germany) Sebastian Freymuth	P	5–6
(France) CMR	27	(France) Stephane Tribaudini	P	All
(France) CMR	27	(France) Loris Cabirou	P	All
(France) CMR	40	(Belgium) Nigel Bailly	Am	All
(France) CMR	40	(France) Wilfried Cazalbon	Am	All
(Italy) Lamborghini Roma by DL Racing	50	(Italy) Diego Locanto	PA	1–3
(Italy) Lamborghini Roma by DL Racing	50	(Italy) Riccardo Ianniello	PA	1–3
(Italy) Lamborghini Roma by DL Racing	50	(Italy) Matteo Desideri	P	4
(Italy) Lamborghini Roma by DL Racing	50	(Italy) Federico Scionti	P	4
(Italy) Lamborghini Roma by DL Racing	50	(Italy) Alessandro Fabi	P	5–6
(Italy) Lamborghini Roma by DL Racing	50	(Italy) Riccardo Ianniello	P	5–6
(Italy) Lamborghini Roma by DL Racing	62	(Egypt) Ibrahim Badawy	P	1
(Italy) Lamborghini Roma by DL Racing	62	(Egypt) Ibrahim Badawy	Am	2–6
(Italy) Lamborghini Roma by DL Racing	68	(Italy) Diego Locanto	PA	5
(Italy) Lamborghini Roma by DL Racing	68	(Italy) Luca Segù	PA	5
(Italy) Lamborghini Roma by DL Racing	68	(Italy) Federico Scionti	P	6
(Italy) Lamborghini Roma by DL Racing	68	(Italy) Luca Segù	P	6
(Italy) Imperiale Racing	51	(Italy) Giacomo Pollini	P	5–6
(Italy) Imperiale Racing	51	(Italy) Matteo Pollini	P	5–6
(Italy) Imperiale Racing	85	(United States) Glen Mcgee	Am	6
(Italy) Imperiale Racing	85	(United States) Anthony McIntosh	Am	6
(Slovakia) Brutal Fish Racing Team	54	(Canada) Jason Keats	LC	All
(Slovakia) Brutal Fish Racing Team	54	(United Kingdom) Charlie Martin	LC	All
(Slovakia) Brutal Fish Racing Team	71	(Slovakia) Martin Ryba	PA	All
(Slovakia) Brutal Fish Racing Team	71	(Italy) Edoardo Liberati	PA	All
(Switzerland) Autovitesse	63	(France) Julien Piguet	Am	5–6
(Switzerland) Autovitesse	63	(France) Alban Varutti	Am	5–6
(Lithuania) RD Signs Racing Team	69	(Lithuania) Audrius Butkevicius	Am	5–6
(Kazakhstan) ART-Line	75	(Kazakhstan) Shota Abkhazava	PA	All
(Kazakhstan) ART-Line	75	(Kyrgyzstan) Egor Orudzhev	PA	All
(Italy) Scuderia Villorba Corse	92	(France) Michael Blanchemain	PA	All
(Italy) Scuderia Villorba Corse	92	(France) Jim Pla	PA	All
(Netherlands) Van der Horst Motorsport	98	(Netherlands) Gerard van der Horst	LC	1–3
Entrylists:

Icon	Class
P	Pro Cup
PA	Pro-Am Cup
Am	Am Cup
LC	Lamborghini Cup

== Race results ==
Bold indicates the overall winner.

Drivers credited with winning pole position for their respective teams are indicated in bold text.

Round		Circuit	Pole position	Pro winners	Pro-Am winners	Am winners	LC Winners
1	R1	(France) Circuit Paul Ricard	(Italy) No. 89 Iron Lynx	**(Italy) No. 6 Vincenzo Sospiri Racing**	(Italy) No. 16 Vincenzo Sospiri Racing	(Belgium) No. 2 Boutsen VDS	(Italy) No. 8 Iron Lynx
1	R1	(France) Circuit Paul Ricard	(Netherlands) **Yelmer Buurman** (Netherlands) Nigel Schoonderwoerd	**(Italy) Mattia Michelotto** **(Belgium) Gilles Stadsbader**	(Poland) Andrzej Lewandowski (Italy) Loris Spinelli	(Belgium) Pierre Feligioni (Belgium) Renaud Kuppens	(San Marino) Luciano Privitelio (France) Donovan Privitelio
1	R2	(France) Circuit Paul Ricard	(Italy) No. 16 Vincenzo Sospiri Racing	**(Italy) No. 61 Oregon Team**	(Italy) No. 81 Target Racing	(Germany) No. 21 Leipert Motorsport	(Italy) No. 8 Iron Lynx
1	R2	(France) Circuit Paul Ricard	(Poland) Andrzej Lewandowski (Italy) **Loris Spinelli**	**(Germany) Sebastian Balthasar** **(Italy) Marzio Moretti**	(Hong Kong) Alex Au (Denmark) Frederik Schandorff	(Italy) Gabriele Rindone	(San Marino) Luciano Privitelio (France) Donovan Privitelio
2	R1	(Belgium) Circuit de Spa-Francorchamps	(Italy) No. 6 Vincenzo Sospiri Racing	**(Italy) No. 6 Vincenzo Sospiri Racing**	(Italy) No. 89 Iron Lynx	(Germany) No. 21 Leipert Motorsport	(Italy) No. 32 Bonaldi Motorsport
2	R1	(Belgium) Circuit de Spa-Francorchamps	(Italy) **Mattia Michelotto** (Belgium) Gilles Stadsbader	**(Italy) Mattia Michelotto** **(Belgium) Gilles Stadsbader**	(Netherlands) Yelmer Buurman (Netherlands) Nigel Schoonderwoerd	(Italy) Gabriele Rindone	(Italy) Paolo Leonardo Biglieri (Serbia) Peter Matic
2	R2	(Belgium) Circuit de Spa-Francorchamps	(Belgium) No. 23 Totaalplan Racing	(Belgium) **No. 23 Totaalplan Racing**	(Slovakia) No. 71 Brutal Fish Racing Team	(Germany) No. 21 Leipert Motorsport	(Italy) No. 8 Iron Lynx
2	R2	(Belgium) Circuit de Spa-Francorchamps	(Belgium) **Cedric Wauters**	(Belgium) **Cedric Wauters**	(Italy) Edoardo Liberati (Slovakia) Martin Ryba	(Italy) Gabriele Rindone	(San Marino) Luciano Privitelio (France) Donovan Privitelio
3	R1	(Germany) Nürburgring	(Italy) No. 6 Vincenzo Sospiri Racing	**(Italy) No. 6 Vincenzo Sospiri Racing**	(Italy) No. 81 Target Racing	(Italy) No. 62 Lamborghini Roma by DL Racing	(Italy) No. 32 Bonaldi Motorsport
3	R1	(Germany) Nürburgring	(Italy) **Mattia Michelotto** (Belgium) Gilles Stadsbader	**(Italy) Mattia Michelotto** **(Belgium) Gilles Stadsbader**	(Hong Kong) Alex Au (Denmark) Frederik Schandorff	(Egypt) Ibrahim Badawy	(Italy) Paolo Leonardo Biglieri (Serbia) Peter Matic
3	R2	(Germany) Nürburgring	(Belgium) No. 28 BDR Competition by Grupo Prom	(Germany) **No. 86 Leipert Motorsport**	(Italy) No. 16 Vincenzo Sospiri Racing	(Germany) No. 21 Leipert Motorsport	(Italy) No. 32 Bonaldi Motorsport
3	R2	(Germany) Nürburgring	(France) **Amaury Bonduel**	(New Zealand) **Brendon Leitch**	(Poland) Andrzej Lewandowski (Italy) Loris Spinelli	(Italy) Gabriele Rindone	(Italy) Paolo Leonardo Biglieri (Serbia) Peter Matic
4	R1	(Spain) Circuit Ricardo Tormo	(Belgium) No. 28 BDR Competition by Grupo Prom	(Germany) **No. 86 Leipert Motorsport**	(Italy) No. 78 Iron Lynx	(Italy) No. 62 Lamborghini Roma by DL Racing	(Germany) No. 65 Leipert Motorsport
4	R1	(Spain) Circuit Ricardo Tormo	(France) **Amaury Bonduel**	(New Zealand) **Brendon Leitch**	(San Marino) Emanuel Colombini (San Marino) Emanuele Zonzini	(Egypt) Ibrahim Badawy	(Germany) Jürgen Krebs
4	R2	(Spain) Circuit Ricardo Tormo	(Belgium) No. 28 BDR Competition by Grupo Prom	**(Italy) No. 61 Oregon Team**	(Italy) No. 81 Target Racing	(Belgium) No. 18 Boutsen VDS	(Italy) No. 32 Bonaldi Motorsport
4	R2	(Spain) Circuit Ricardo Tormo	(France) **Amaury Bonduel**	**(Germany) Sebastian Balthasar** **(Italy) Marzio Moretti**	(Hong Kong) Alex Au (Finland) Patrick Kujala	(France) Elie Dubelly (Saudi Arabia) Karim Ojjeh	(Italy) Paolo Leonardo Biglieri (Serbia) Peter Matic
5	R1	(Italy) Vallelunga Circuit	(Italy) No. 6 Vincenzo Sospiri Racing	**(Italy) No. 6 Vincenzo Sospiri Racing**	(Italy) No. 16 Vincenzo Sospiri Racing	(Italy) No. 60 Vincenzo Sospiri Racing	(Germany) No. 65 Leipert Motorsport
5	R1	(Italy) Vallelunga Circuit	(Italy) **Mattia Michelotto** (Belgium) Gilles Stadsbader	**(Italy) Mattia Michelotto** **(Belgium) Gilles Stadsbader**	(Poland) Andrzej Lewandowski (Italy) Loris Spinelli	(Italy) Giovanni Anapoli (Italy) Piergiacomo Randazzo	(Germany) Jürgen Krebs
5	R2	(Italy) Vallelunga Circuit	(Italy) No. 16 Vincenzo Sospiri Racing	**(Italy) No. 10 Iron Lynx**	(Italy) No. 16 Vincenzo Sospiri Racing	(Italy) No. 62 Lamborghini Roma by DL Racing	(Germany) No. 65 Leipert Motorsport
5	R2	(Italy) Vallelunga Circuit	(Poland) Andrzej Lewandowski (Italy) **Loris Spinelli**	**(Portugal) Rodrigo Testa** **(Belgium) Ugo de Wilde**	(Poland) Andrzej Lewandowski (Italy) Loris Spinelli	(Egypt) Ibrahim Badawy	(Germany) Jürgen Krebs
WF	R1	(Italy) Vallelunga Circuit	(Italy) No. 6 Vincenzo Sospiri Racing	**(Italy) No. 6 Vincenzo Sospiri Racing**	(Italy) No. 16 Vincenzo Sospiri Racing	(Switzerland) No. 63 Autovitesse	(Germany) No. 65 Leipert Motorsport
WF	R1	(Italy) Vallelunga Circuit	(Italy) **Mattia Michelotto** (Belgium) Gilles Stadsbader	**(Italy) Mattia Michelotto** **(Belgium) Gilles Stadsbader**	(Poland) Andrzej Lewandowski (Italy) Loris Spinelli	(France) Julien Piguet (France) Alban Varutti	(Germany) Jürgen Krebs
WF	R2	(Italy) Vallelunga Circuit	(Italy) No. 81 Target Racing	**(Italy) No. 9 Target Racing**	(Italy) No. 16 Vincenzo Sospiri Racing	(Switzerland) No. 63 Autovitesse	(Italy) No. 8 Iron Lynx
WF	R2	(Italy) Vallelunga Circuit	(Hong Kong) Alex Au (Denmark) **Frederik Schandorff**	**(Denmark) Largim Ali** **(Sweden) Oliver Söderström**	(Poland) Andrzej Lewandowski (Italy) Loris Spinelli	(France) Julien Piguet (France) Alban Varutti	(San Marino) Luciano Privitelio (France) Donovan Privitelio
Results:
