= 2015 Italian F4 Championship =

Motorsport season

The 2015 Italian F4 Championship was the second season of the Italian Formula 4 Championship. It began on 3 May in Vallelunga and finished on 4 October in Misano after seven triple header rounds.

== Teams and drivers ==
Team	No.	Driver	Class	Rounds
(Italy) Prema Powerteam	2	(Germany) Tim Zimmermann		2
(Italy) Prema Powerteam	25	(Brazil) Giuliano Raucci		All
(Italy) Prema Powerteam	33	(China) Guanyu Zhou		All
(Italy) Prema Powerteam	99	(Estonia) Ralf Aron		All
Malta Formula Racing	3	(Russia) Yan Leon Shlom	T	1–4
Malta Formula Racing	11	(Mexico) Raúl Guzmán	T	All
Malta Formula Racing	77	(Colombia) Kevin Kanayet	T	All
(Germany) Kfzteile24 Mücke Motorsport	4	(Russia) Robert Shwartzman		All
(Germany) Kfzteile24 Mücke Motorsport	5	(Germany) David Beckmann		1–6
(Germany) Kfzteile24 Mücke Motorsport	6	(United Kingdom) Lando Norris		2, 4, 6
(Germany) Kfzteile24 Mücke Motorsport	12	(Austria) Thomas Preining	T	1
(Germany) Kfzteile24 Mücke Motorsport	12	(Germany) Mike Ortmann	T	2–3
(Germany) Kfzteile24 Mücke Motorsport	63	(Russia) Yan Leon Shlom	T	5–6
(Switzerland) Jenzer Motorsport	7	(Argentina) Marcos Siebert		All
(Switzerland) Jenzer Motorsport	8	(Switzerland) Lucas Mauron		All
(Switzerland) Jenzer Motorsport	9	(Switzerland) Nico Rindlisbacher		1–2, 4–7
(Switzerland) Jenzer Motorsport	10	(Bahrain) Ali Al-Khalifa		1
(Switzerland) Jenzer Motorsport	10	(Germany) Arlind Hoti		2–3
(Switzerland) Jenzer Motorsport	16	(Switzerland) Moritz Müller-Crepon		3, 5–6
(Switzerland) Jenzer Motorsport	18	(Bahrain) Ali Al-Khalifa		2
(Italy) DieGi Motorsport	12	(Italy) Riccardo Pollastri	T	7
(Italy) Vincenzo Sospiri Racing	14	(Venezuela) Mauricio Baíz		All
(Italy) Vincenzo Sospiri Racing	15	(Japan) Marino Sato		All
(Italy) Vincenzo Sospiri Racing	18	(Italy) Simone Cunati		7
(Switzerland) RB Racing	20	(China) Yifei Ye		3–7
(Switzerland) RB Racing	21	(Italy) Diego Bertonelli		All
(Switzerland) RB Racing	22	(Poland) Julia Pankiewicz	W	All
(Switzerland) RB Racing	88	(Poland) Wiktoria Pankiewicz	W	1–6
(Italy) DRZ Benelli	23	(Guatemala) Ian Rodríguez		6
(Italy) Torino Squadra Corse	27	(Australia) Alex Peroni		All
(Italy) Antonelli Motorsport	28	(Italy) Federico Malvestiti		5, 7
(Italy) Antonelli Motorsport	32	(Romania) Kikko Galbiati		All
(Italy) Antonelli Motorsport	44	(Italy) Matteo Desideri		1–4
(Italy) Antonelli Motorsport	45	(Italy) Mattia Ferrari		1–4
(Italy) Antonelli Motorsport	50	(Brazil) João Vieira		All
Israel F4	55	(Israel) Bar Baruch		All
Team Costa RicaTCR Motorsport	56	(Ecuador) Fernando Madera Jr.		1–6
(Italy) Teramo Racing Team	71	(Italy) Riccardo Ponzio		All

== Race calendar and results ==
The calendar was published on 27 November 2014. On 15 May 2015, it was announced that the round scheduled for Franciacorta (13–14 June) would be moved to Imola, to be held over the weekend of 27–28 June.

Round		Circuit	Date	Pole position	Fastest lap	Winning driver	Winning team	Secondary Class winner
1	R1	Vallelunga Circuit, Campagnano di Roma	2 May	(Estonia) Ralf Aron	(Estonia) Ralf Aron	(Estonia) Ralf Aron	(Italy) Prema Powerteam	T: (Colombia) Kevin Kanayet; W: (Poland) Julia Pankiewicz
1	R2	Vallelunga Circuit, Campagnano di Roma	3 May		(Germany) David Beckmann	(Germany) David Beckmann	(Germany) Kfzteile24 Mucke Motorsport	T: (Colombia) Kevin Kanayet; W: (Poland) Wiktoria Pankiewicz
1	R3	Vallelunga Circuit, Campagnano di Roma	3 May	(China) Guanyu Zhou	(Russia) Robert Shwartzman	(Estonia) Ralf Aron	(Italy) Prema Powerteam	T: (Colombia) Kevin Kanayet; W: (Poland) Wiktoria Pankiewicz
2	R1	Autodromo Nazionale di Monza, Monza	30 May	(Russia) Robert Shwartzman	(Germany) David Beckmann	(China) Guanyu Zhou	(Italy) Prema Powerteam	T: (Germany) Mike Ortmann; W: (Poland) Wiktoria Pankiewicz
2	R2	Autodromo Nazionale di Monza, Monza	31 May		(United Kingdom) Lando Norris	(China) Guanyu Zhou	(Italy) Prema Powerteam	T: (Russia) Yan Leon Shlom; W: (Poland) Wiktoria Pankiewicz
2	R3	Autodromo Nazionale di Monza, Monza	31 May	(China) Guanyu Zhou	(Venezuela) Mauricio Baíz	(China) Guanyu Zhou	(Italy) Prema Powerteam	T: (Germany) Mike Ortmann; W: (Poland) Wiktoria Pankiewicz
3	R1	Autodromo Enzo e Dino Ferrari, Imola	27 June	(Estonia) Ralf Aron	(Estonia) Ralf Aron	(Estonia) Ralf Aron	(Italy) Prema Powerteam	T: (Mexico) Raúl Guzmán; W: (Poland) Julia Pankiewicz
3	R2	Autodromo Enzo e Dino Ferrari, Imola	28 June		(Argentina) Marcos Siebert	(Germany) David Beckmann	(Germany) Kfzteile24 Mucke Motorsport	T: (Russia) Yan Leon Shlom; W: (Poland) Wiktoria Pankiewicz
3	R3	Autodromo Enzo e Dino Ferrari, Imola	28 June	(Estonia) Ralf Aron	(Estonia) Ralf Aron	(Estonia) Ralf Aron	(Italy) Prema Powerteam	T: (Germany) Mike Ortmann; W: (Poland) Julia Pankiewicz
4	R1	Mugello Circuit, Scarperia e San Piero	12 July	(Estonia) Ralf Aron	(Estonia) Ralf Aron	(Estonia) Ralf Aron	(Italy) Prema Powerteam	T: (Mexico) Raúl Guzmán; W: (Poland) Wiktoria Pankiewicz
4	R2	Mugello Circuit, Scarperia e San Piero	13 July		(Argentina) Marcos Siebert	(Argentina) Marcos Siebert	(Switzerland) Jenzer Motorsport	T: (Mexico) Raúl Guzmán; W: (Poland) Wiktoria Pankiewicz
4	R3	Mugello Circuit, Scarperia e San Piero	13 July	(Estonia) Ralf Aron	(Estonia) Ralf Aron	(Estonia) Ralf Aron	(Italy) Prema Powerteam	T: (Colombia) Kevin Kanayet; W: (Poland) Julia Pankiewicz
5	R1	Adria International Raceway, Adria	6 September	(Germany) David Beckmann	(Germany) David Beckmann	(Germany) David Beckmann	(Germany) Kfzteile24 Mucke Motorsport	T: (Colombia) Kevin Kanayet; W: (Poland) Julia Pankiewicz
5	R2	Adria International Raceway, Adria	6 September		(Russia) Robert Shwartzman	(Russia) Robert Shwartzman	(Germany) Kfzteile24 Mucke Motorsport	T: (Russia) Yan Leon Shlom
5	R3	Adria International Raceway, Adria	6 September	(Russia) Robert Shwartzman	(Germany) David Beckmann	(Russia) Robert Shwartzman	(Germany) Kfzteile24 Mucke Motorsport	T: (Colombia) Kevin Kanayet; W: (Poland) Julia Pankiewicz
6	R1	Autodromo Enzo e Dino Ferrari, Imola	19 September	(Estonia) Ralf Aron	(United Kingdom) Lando Norris	(Estonia) Ralf Aron	(Italy) Prema Powerteam	T: (Colombia) Kevin Kanayet; W: no finishers
6	R2	Autodromo Enzo e Dino Ferrari, Imola	20 September		(Brazil) Giuliano Raucci	(Colombia) Kevin Kanayet	Malta Formula Racing	T: (Colombia) Kevin Kanayet; W: (Poland) Julia Pankiewicz
6	R3	Autodromo Enzo e Dino Ferrari, Imola	20 September	(Estonia) Ralf Aron	(United Kingdom) Lando Norris	(Estonia) Ralf Aron	(Italy) Prema Powerteam	T: (Colombia) Kevin Kanayet; W: (Poland) Julia Pankiewicz
7	R1	Misano World Circuit Marco Simoncelli, Misano	3 October	(Russia) Robert Shwartzman	(Estonia) Ralf Aron	(Estonia) Ralf Aron	(Italy) Prema Powerteam	T: (Mexico) Raúl Guzmán; W: (Poland) Julia Pankiewicz
7	R2	Misano World Circuit Marco Simoncelli, Misano	3 October		(Russia) Robert Shwartzman	(Russia) Robert Shwartzman	(Germany) Kfzteile24 Mucke Motorsport	T: (Mexico) Raúl Guzmán; W: (Poland) Julia Pankiewicz
7	R3	Misano World Circuit Marco Simoncelli, Misano	4 October	(Russia) Robert Shwartzman	(Japan) Marino Sato	(Argentina) Marcos Siebert	(Switzerland) Jenzer Motorsport	T: (Mexico) Raúl Guzmán; W: (Poland) Julia Pankiewicz

== Championship standings ==
Points were awarded as follows:

	1	2	3	4	5	6	7	8	9	10	FT	FL
Race 1, 3	25	18	15	12	10	8	6	4	2	1	**5**	1
Race 2	13	11	9	6	5	4	2	1				1

=== Drivers' standings ===
Pos	Driver	VLL			MNZ			IMO1			MUG			ADR			IMO2			MIS			Pts
Pos	Driver	R1	R2	R3	R1	R2	R3	R1	R2	R3	R1	R2	R3	R1	R2	R3	R1	R2	R3	R1	R2	R3	Pts
1	(Estonia) Ralf Aron	**1**	11	1	3	6	2	**1**	15	**1**	**1**	11	**1**	3	6	2	**1**	4	**1**	1	Ret	20	331
2	(China) Guanyu Zhou	4	8	**2**	1	1	**1**	2	Ret	2	6	5	6	2	15	3	3	5	5	8	20	13	223
3	(Russia) Robert Shwartzman	3	5	22	**2**	Ret	4	3	4	7	15	12	13	4	1	**1**	2	6	2	**4**	1	**4**	212
4	(Germany) David Beckmann	10	1	5	4	2	Ret	8	1	9	3	15	2	**1**	4	5	4	17	3				176
5	(Argentina) Marcos Siebert	Ret	Ret	EX	10	7	9	6	2	4	8	1	3	13	7	6	18	19	7	14	8	1	112
6	(Italy) Diego Bertonelli	Ret	24	10	14	11	16	10	8	10	9	3	5	Ret	10	17	6	3	16	3	2	3	83
7	(Israel) Bar Baruch	9	2	11	5	4	6	5	3	8	7	4	17	19	17†	10	23†	12	17	7	6	16	83
8	(Brazil) João Vieira	2	4	12	Ret	3	5	9	Ret	3	2	8	Ret	Ret	8	12	Ret	Ret	DNS	10	11	DNS	81
9	(Switzerland) Nico Rindlisbacher	5	23	14	Ret	DNS	DNS				17	16	4	5	5	7	12	8	12	5	3	7	69
10	(Japan) Marino Sato	7	7	9	13	9	8	4	Ret	13	14	18	16	6	2	14	13	21†	15	Ret	4	5	62
11	(United Kingdom) Lando Norris				Ret	5	3				12	7	8				5	23	4				51
12	(Venezuela) Mauricio Baíz	Ret	Ret	4	24†	24	11	17	14	14	5	6	9	7	3	16	15	9	14	9	13	9	48
13	(Brazil) Giuliano Raucci	Ret	16	Ret	8	Ret	10	7	Ret	Ret	4	10	7	Ret	11	4	9	NC	9	17	19	21	45
14	(Australia) Alex Peroni	20	9	23†	19	16	Ret	14	7	Ret	22	19	12	12	Ret	11	8	2	6	2	18	15	43
15	(Colombia) Kevin Kanayet	6	6	7	17	Ret	19†	13	Ret	19	11	14	11	10	Ret	8	10	1	8	Ret	12	17	41
16	(Switzerland) Lucas Mauron	8	3	6	11	8	Ret	23	9	6	13	9	15	8	13	13	17	13	21†	13	7	10	37
17	(Mexico) Raúl Guzmán	Ret	15	8	Ret	12	15	11	10	12	10	2	14	11	19†	15	11	20†	10	6	5	12	30
18	(Italy) Matteo Desideri	Ret	13	3	6	Ret	7	18	Ret	Ret	18	20	22										29
19	(Italy) Simone Cunati																			16	Ret	2	18
20	(Germany) Mike Ortmann				7	21	14	Ret	Ret	5													16
21	(China) Yifei Ye							15	Ret	11	19	17	Ret	14	Ret	19	7	18	11	12	9	8	10
22	(Italy) Riccardo Ponzio	13	17	15	16	13	13	21	17	21	20	22	Ret	Ret	EX	EX	21	14	18	18	10	6	8
23	(Russia) Yan Leon Shlom	12	12	13	Ret	10	Ret	12	5	Ret	16	13	21	15	17†	9	20	11	13				7
24	(Germany) Arlind Hoti				12	23	12	16	6	Ret													4
25	(Switzerland) Moritz Müller-Crepon							Ret	Ret	15				9	9	21	14	7	Ret				4
26	(Germany) Tim Zimmermann				9	20	Ret																2
27	(Romania) Kikko Galbiati	14	19	16	23†	15	Ret	20	11	20	23	26†	10	Ret	16	18	19	22†	20	11	15	11	1
28	(Guatemala) Ian Rodríguez																16	10	22				0
29	(Austria) Thomas Preining	19	10	Ret																			0
30	(Italy) Mattia Ferrari	11	14	17	15	17	17	19	12	16	21	21	20										0
31	(Italy) Federico Malvestiti													16	12	20				20	17	19	0
32	(Poland) Wiktoria Pankiewicz	17	21	20	21	19	18	Ret	13	22†	24	23	19	20	Ret	24	DNS	DNS	DNS				0
33	(Poland) Julia Pankiewicz	16	22	21	22	22	Ret	22	Ret	18	25	24	18	18	Ret	23	Ret	16	19	15	14	14	0
34	(Ecuador) Fernando Madera Jr.	15	18	19	20	18	Ret	Ret	16	17	Ret	25	Ret	17	14	22	22	15	Ret				0
35	(Bahrain) Ali Al-Khalifa	18	20	18	18	14	Ret																0
36	(Italy) Riccardo Pollastri																			19	16	18	0
F4 Woman Trophy
1	(Poland) Julia Pankiewicz	16	22	21	22	22	Ret	22	Ret	18	25	24	18	18	Ret	23	Ret	16	19	15	14	14	343
2	(Poland) Wiktoria Pankiewicz	17	21	20	21	19	18	Ret	13	22†	24	23	19	20	Ret	24	DNS	DNS	DNS				231
F4 Trophy
1	(Colombia) Kevin Kanayet	6	6	7	17	Ret	19†	13	Ret	19	11	14	11	10	Ret	8	10	1	8	Ret	12	17	337
2	(Mexico) Raúl Guzmán	Ret	15	8	Ret	12	15	11	10	12	10	2	14	11	19†	15	11	20†	10	6	5	12	309
3	(Russia) Yan Leon Shlom	12	12	13	Ret	10	Ret	12	5	Ret	16	13	21	15	17†	9	20	11	13				214
4	(Germany) Mike Ortmann				7	21	14	Ret	Ret	5													84
5	(Italy) Riccardo Pollastri																			19	16	18	42
6	(Austria) Thomas Preining	19	10	Ret																			26
Pos	Driver	R1	R2	R3	R1	R2	R3	R1	R2	R3	R1	R2	R3	R1	R2	R3	R1	R2	R3	R1	R2	R3	Pts
Pos	Driver	VLL			MNZ			IMO1			MUG			ADR			IMO2			MIS			Pts

Colour	Result
Gold	Winner
Silver	Second place
Bronze	Third place
Green	Points classification
Blue	Non-points classification
Blue	Non-classified finish (NC)
Purple	Retired, not classified (Ret)
Red	Did not qualify (DNQ)
Red	Did not pre-qualify (DNPQ)
Black	Disqualified (DSQ)
White	Did not start (DNS)
White	Withdrew (WD)
White	Race cancelled (C)
Blank	Did not practice (DNP)
Blank	Did not arrive (DNA)
Blank	Excluded (EX)

**Bold** – Pole
Italics – Fastest Lap
† — Did not finish, but classified

=== Teams' championship ===
Pos	Team	Points
1	(Italy) Prema Powerteam	339
2	(Germany) Kfzteile24 Mücke Motorsport	304
3	(Switzerland) Jenzer Motorsport	170
4	(Italy) Antonelli Motorsport	119
5	(Italy) Vincenzo Sospiri Racing	97
6	Israel F4	83
7	(Switzerland) RB Racing	80
8	Malta Formula Racing	71
9	(Italy) Torino Squadra Corse	40
10	(Italy) Teramo Racing Team	8
