= Raúl Guzmán (racing driver) =

Mexican racing driver (born 1999)

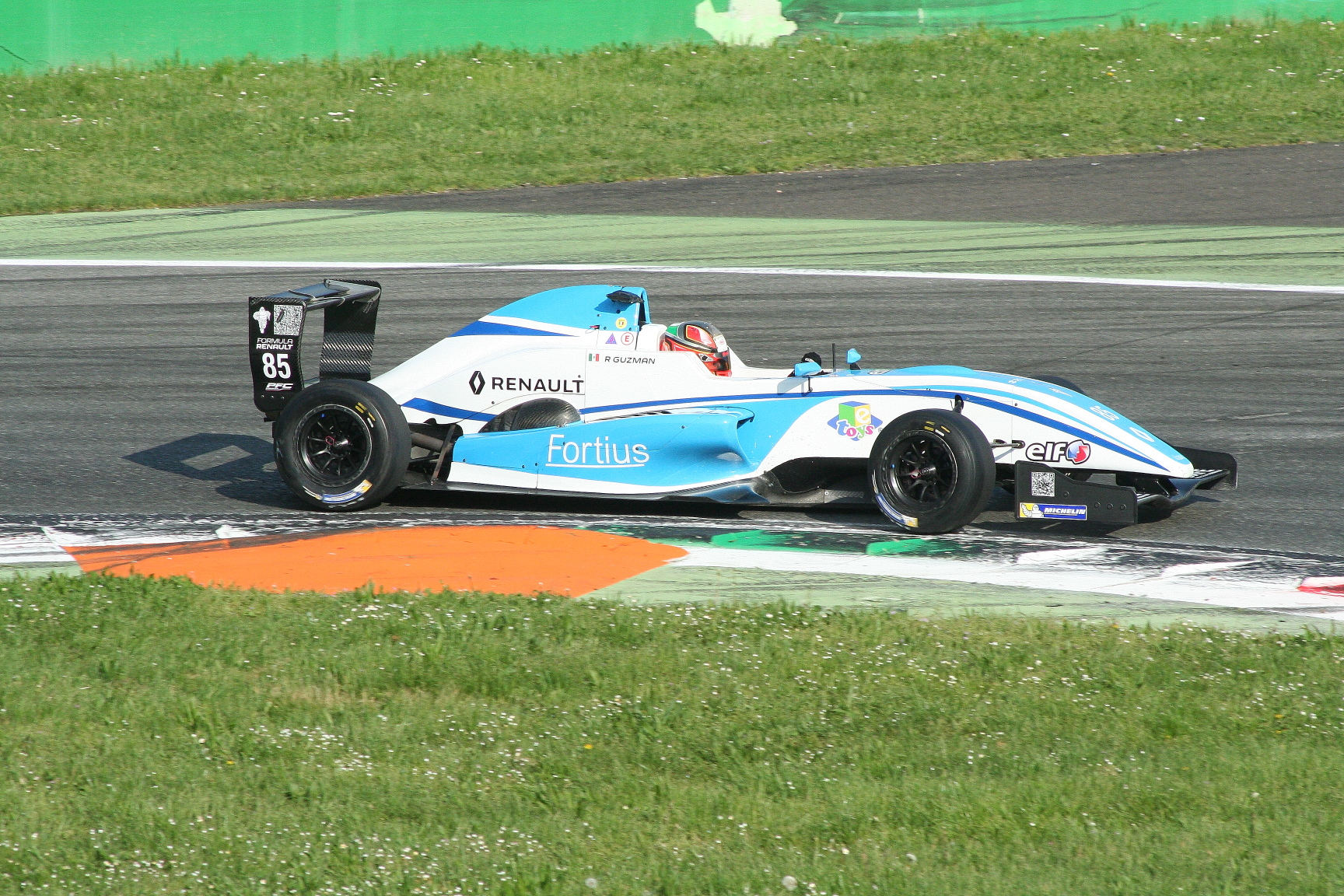
- Guzmán in 2018
- Nationality: (Mexico) Mexican
- Born: February 26, 1999 (age 27) Guadalajara, Mexico

Formula Regional European Championship career
- Debut season: 2019
- Current team: DR Formula RP Motorsport
- Categorisation: FIA Silver
- Car number: 41
- Starts: 24
- Wins: 0
- Podiums: 2
- Poles: 0
- Fastest laps: 0
- Best finish: 6th in 2019

Previous series
- 2015–16 2017: Italian F4 Championship, Eurocup Formula Renault 2.0

Raúl Guzmán Marchina (born February 26, 1999) is a Mexican racing driver, currently established in Bologna. He last competed in the Italian GT Championship.

== Career ==
=== Karting ===
Born in Guadalajara, Guzmán began karting in 2011, at age eleven, and claimed the SuperKarts USA title in 2014.

=== Italian F4 Championship ===
The following year, Guzmán graduated to single-seaters in Italian F4, taking seventeenth in his debut season, and third the following year after a battle for the title between himself, Mick Schumacher and eventual champion Marcos Siebert.

For 2017, Guzmán switched to the Formula Renault 2.0 championships with R-ace GP. He had three-point-scoring finishes including highest finishing position on the fifth place at Silverstone. While in the standings he ended seventeenth, behind his teammates Will Palmer, Robert Shwartzman and Max Defourny.

== Racing record ==
=== Career summary ===
Season	Series	Team	Races	Wins	Poles	F/Laps	Podiums	Points	Position
2015	Italian F4 Championship	Malta Formula Racing	21	0	0	0	1	30	17th
2016	Italian F4 Championship	DR Formula	22	2	2	1	7	202	**3rd**
2017	Formula Renault Eurocup	R-ace GP	23	0	0	0	0	13	17th
2017	Formula Renault NEC	R-ace GP	3	0	0	0	0	0	NC†
2018	Formula Renault Eurocup	Fortec Motorsports	20	0	0	0	0	4	21st
2018	Formula Renault NEC	Fortec Motorsports	8	0	0	0	0	0	NC†
2018	Euroformula Open Championship	Fortec Motorsports	2	0	0	0	0	0	20th
2018	Pro Mazda Championship	RP Motorsport	4	0	0	0	1	51	17th
2019	Formula Regional European Championship	DR Formula RP Motorsport	24	0	0	0	2	180	6th
2020	Lamborghini Super Trofeo Europe	Target Racing	9	1	0	0	4	70	6th
2021	Lamborghini Super Trofeo Europe	Target Racing							
2022	Italian GT Endurance Championship - GT3	Imperiale Racing	4	0	0	0	3	36	5th
2023	Italian GT Endurance Championship - GT3	Imperiale Racing	4	1	1	0	2	39	**3rd**
2023	Ultimate Cup Series - Proto P3	Team Virage	1	0	0	0	0	0.5	38th
2024	Italian GT Sprint Championship - GT3	AKM Motorsport	2	0	0	0	0	9	NC

^{†} As Guzmán was a guest driver, he was ineligible for points.

=== Complete Italian F4 Championship results ===
Year	Team	1	2	3	4	5	6	7	8	9	10	11	12	13	14	15	16	17	18	19	20	21	22	23	Rank	Points
2015	Malta Formula Racing	VAL; 1 Ret	VAL; 2; 15	VAL; 3; 8	MNZ; 1 Ret	MNZ; 2; 12	MNZ; 3; 15	IMO1; 1; 11	IMO1; 2; 10	IMO1; 3; 12	MUG; 1; 10	MUG; 2; 2	MUG; 3; 14	ADR; 1; 11	ADR; 2; 19†	ADR; 3; 15	IMO2; 1; 11	IMO2; 2; 20†	IMO2; 3; 10	MIS; 1; 6	MIS; 2; 5	MIS; 3; 12			17th	30
2016	DR Formula	MIS; 1; 2	MIS; 2	MIS; 3; 1	MIS; 4; 3	ADR; 1	**ADR**; **2**; 1	**ADR**; **3** Ret	ADR; 4; 5	IMO1; 1; 27	IMO1; 2; 6	IMO1; 3; 9	MUG; 1; 4	MUG; 2; 4	MUG; 3; 8	VAL; 1; 1	VAL; 2; 6	VAL; 3 Ret	IMO2; 1; 9	IMO2; 2; 7	IMO2; 3 Ret	MNZ; 1; 3	MNZ; 2; 2	MNZ; 3; 16	3rd	202

=== Complete Formula Renault Eurocup results ===
Year	Team	1	2	3	4	5	6	7	8	9	10	11	12	13	14	15	16	17	18	19	20	21	22	23	Rank	Points
2017	R-ace GP	MNZ; 1; 22	MNZ; 2; 10	SIL; 1; 12	SIL; 2; 5	PAU; 1; 9	PAU; 2; 11	MON; 1; 19	MON; 2; 22	HUN; 1; 12	HUN; 2; 16	HUN; 3; 13	NÜR; 1; 21	NÜR; 2; 13	RBR; 1; 22	RBR; 2; 18	LEC; 1; 12	LEC; 2; 13	SPA; 1; 16	SPA; 2; 32	SPA; 3; 16	CAT; 1; 26	CAT; 2 Ret	CAT; 3; 22	17th	13
2018	Fortec Motorsports	LEC; 1; 13	LEC; 2; 22	MNZ; 1; 19	MNZ; 2; 21	SIL; 1 Ret	SIL; 2; 9	MON; 1; 20	MON; 2; 16	RBR; 1; 15	RBR; 2; 12	SPA; 1; 13	SPA; 2; 23	HUN; 1 Ret	HUN; 2 Ret	NÜR; 1; 25	NÜR; 2; 18	HOC; 1; 9	HOC; 2; 11	CAT; 1; 15	CAT; 2; 16				21st	4

=== Complete Formula Renault NEC results ===
(key) (Races in bold indicate pole position) (Races in italics indicate fastest lap)

Year	Entrant	1	2	3	4	5	6	7	8	9	10	11	12	DC	Points
2017	R-ace GP	MNZ; 1	MNZ; 2	ASS; 1	ASS; 2	NÜR; 1	NÜR; 2	SPA; 1; 16	SPA; 2; 32	SPA; 3; 16	HOC; 1	HOC; 2		NC†	0
2018	Fortec Motorsports	PAU; 1	PAU; 2	MNZ; 1	MNZ; 2	SPA; 1; 13	SPA; 2; 23	HUN; 1 Ret	HUN; 2 Ret	NÜR; 1; 25	NÜR; 2; 18	HOC; 1; 9	HOC; 2; 11	NC†	0

† As Guzmán was a guest driver, he was ineligible for points

=== Pro Mazda Championship ===
Year	Team	1	2	3	4	5	6	7	8	9	10	11	12	13	14	15	16	Rank	Points
2018	RP Motorsport	STP	STP	BAR	BAR	IMS	IMS	LOR	RDA; 7	RDA; 14	TOR; 3	TOR; 13	MOH	MOH	GMP	POR	POR	17th	51

=== Complete Formula Regional European Championship results ===
(key) (Races in bold indicate pole position; races in italics indicate fastest lap)

Year	Entrant	1	2	3	4	5	6	7	8	9	10	11	12	13	14	15	16	17	18	19	20	21	22	23	24	25	DC	Points
2019	DR Formula RP Motorsport	LEC; 1; 5	LEC; 2; 4	LEC; 3; 8	VLL; 1; 6	VLL; 2; 9	VLL; 3 C	HUN; 1; 8	HUN; 2; 7	HUN; 3; 5	RBR; 1; 5	RBR; 2 Ret	RBR; 3; 4	IMO; 1; 5	IMO; 2; 4	IMO; 3; 7	IMO; 4; 12	CAT; 1; 4	CAT; 2; 7	CAT; 3; 6	MUG; 1; 10	MUG; 2; 12	MUG; 3; 8	MNZ; 1; 3	MNZ; 2; 2	MNZ; 3; 5	6th	180
