= 2026 Italian GT Championship =

Italian Motorsports Championship

The 2026 Italian GT Championship was the 35th season of the Italian GT Championship, the grand tourer-style sports car racing founded by the Italian Automobile Club (Automobile Club d'Italia). The season began on 24 April at Imola and concluded on 1 November at Mugello.

== Calendar ==
Map of circuit locations

Round	Circuit	Date	Series
1	Autodromo Internazionale Enzo e Dino Ferrari, Imola, Emilia-Romagna	24–26 April	Sprint
2	Misano World Circuit Marco Simoncelli, Misano Adriatico, Emilia-Romagna	8–10 May	Endurance
3	ACI Vallelunga Circuit, Campagnano di Roma, Rome	22–24 May	Sprint
4	Autodromo Nazionale Monza, Monza, Lombardy	19–21 June	Endurance
5	Autodromo Internazionale del Mugello, Mugello, Tuscany	24–26 July	Sprint
6	Autodromo Internazionale Enzo e Dino Ferrari, Imola, Emilia-Romagna	4–6 September	Endurance
7	Autodromo Nazionale Monza, Monza, Lombardy	9–11 October	Sprint
8	Autodromo Internazionale del Mugello, Mugello, Tuscany	30 October – 1 November	Endurance

== Entry list ==
=== Endurance Cup ===
Team	Car	Engine	No.	Drivers	Class	Rounds
GT3
(France) CSA Racing	McLaren 720S GT3 Evo	McLaren M840T 4.0 L Turbo V8	1	(India) Sai Sanjay	P	1–3
(France) CSA Racing	McLaren 720S GT3 Evo	McLaren M840T 4.0 L Turbo V8	1	(Belgium) Baptiste Moulin	P	1–2
(France) CSA Racing	McLaren 720S GT3 Evo	McLaren M840T 4.0 L Turbo V8	1	(France) Arthur Rougier	P	1–2
(France) CSA Racing	McLaren 720S GT3 Evo	McLaren M840T 4.0 L Turbo V8	1	(France) Simon Gachet	P	3
(France) CSA Racing	McLaren 720S GT3 Evo	McLaren M840T 4.0 L Turbo V8	1	(France) Luciano Morano	P	3
(France) CSA Racing	McLaren 720S GT3 Evo	McLaren M840T 4.0 L Turbo V8	5	(France) Simon Gachet	P	1–2
(France) CSA Racing	McLaren 720S GT3 Evo	McLaren M840T 4.0 L Turbo V8	5	(France) Luciano Morano	P	1–2
(France) CSA Racing	McLaren 720S GT3 Evo	McLaren M840T 4.0 L Turbo V8	5	(Italy) Alessio Deledda	P	1–2
(Italy) Easy Race	Ferrari 296 GT3	Ferrari F163CE 3.0 L Turbo V6	3	(Italy) Luigi Coluccio	PA	All
(Italy) Easy Race	Ferrari 296 GT3	Ferrari F163CE 3.0 L Turbo V6	3	(Italy) Mattia Marchiante	PA	All
(Italy) Easy Race	Ferrari 296 GT3	Ferrari F163CE 3.0 L Turbo V6	3	(Italy) Carlo Tamburini	PA	All
(Italy) Easy Race	Ferrari 296 GT3	Ferrari F163CE 3.0 L Turbo V6	26	(Italy) Leonardo Gorini	Am	All
(Italy) Easy Race	Ferrari 296 GT3	Ferrari F163CE 3.0 L Turbo V6	26	(Italy) Massimo Perrina	Am	All
(Italy) Easy Race	Ferrari 296 GT3	Ferrari F163CE 3.0 L Turbo V6	26	(Italy) Daniel Mancinelli	Am	1, 3–4
(Italy) Easy Race	Ferrari 296 GT3	Ferrari F163CE 3.0 L Turbo V6	26	(Italy) Luca Ghiotto	Am	2
(Slovakia) ARC Bratislava	Lamborghini Huracán GT3 Evo 2	Lamborghini DGF 5.2 L V10	4	(Slovakia) Adam Konôpka	Am	4
(Slovakia) ARC Bratislava	Lamborghini Huracán GT3 Evo 2	Lamborghini DGF 5.2 L V10	4	(Slovakia) Miro Konôpka	Am	4
(Slovakia) ARC Bratislava	Lamborghini Huracán GT3 Evo 2	Lamborghini DGF 5.2 L V10	4	(Slovakia) Zdeno Mikulasko	Am	4
(Italy) BMW Italia Ceccato Racing	BMW M4 GT3 Evo	BMW P58 3.0 L Twin Turbo I6	7	(Finland) William Alatalo	P	All
(Italy) BMW Italia Ceccato Racing	BMW M4 GT3 Evo	BMW P58 3.0 L Twin Turbo I6	7	(Sweden) Alfred Nilsson	P	All
(Italy) BMW Italia Ceccato Racing	BMW M4 GT3 Evo	BMW P58 3.0 L Twin Turbo I6	7	(Romania) Filip Ugran	P	All
(Italy) BMW Italia Ceccato Racing	BMW M4 GT3 Evo	BMW P58 3.0 L Twin Turbo I6	8	(Italy) Filippo Barberi	PA	All
(Italy) BMW Italia Ceccato Racing	BMW M4 GT3 Evo	BMW P58 3.0 L Twin Turbo I6	8	(Italy) Jacopo Cimenes	PA	All
(Italy) BMW Italia Ceccato Racing	BMW M4 GT3 Evo	BMW P58 3.0 L Twin Turbo I6	8	(Italy) Riccardo Leone Cirelli	PA	All
(Germany) Tresor Attempto Racing	Audi R8 LMS Evo II	Audi DAR 5.2 L V10	9	(Italy) Marco Cassarà	PA	1
(Germany) Tresor Attempto Racing	Audi R8 LMS Evo II	Audi DAR 5.2 L V10	9	(Italy) Rocco Mazzola	PA	1
(Germany) Tresor Attempto Racing	Audi R8 LMS Evo II	Audi DAR 5.2 L V10	9	(Denmark) Sebastian Øgaard	PA	1
(Germany) Tresor Attempto Racing	Audi R8 LMS Evo II	Audi DAR 5.2 L V10	9	(Italy) Marco Cassarà	Am	2
(Germany) Tresor Attempto Racing	Audi R8 LMS Evo II	Audi DAR 5.2 L V10	9	(South Africa) Marius Jackson	Am	2
(Germany) Tresor Attempto Racing	Audi R8 LMS Evo II	Audi DAR 5.2 L V10	9	(Denmark) Sebastian Øgaard	Am	2
(Germany) Tresor Attempto Racing	Audi R8 LMS Evo II	Audi DAR 5.2 L V10	22	(Italy) Marco Cassarà	Am	3–4
(Germany) Tresor Attempto Racing	Audi R8 LMS Evo II	Audi DAR 5.2 L V10	22	(Denmark) Sebastian Øgaard	Am	3–4
(Germany) Tresor Attempto Racing	Audi R8 LMS Evo II	Audi DAR 5.2 L V10	22	(Italy) Vittorio Viglietti	Am	3–4
(Germany) Tresor Attempto Racing	Audi R8 LMS Evo II	Audi DAR 5.2 L V10	88	(Italy) Alberto Clementi Pisani	PA	1–2
(Germany) Tresor Attempto Racing	Audi R8 LMS Evo II	Audi DAR 5.2 L V10	88	(Italy) Alberto Di Folco	PA	1–2
(Germany) Tresor Attempto Racing	Audi R8 LMS Evo II	Audi DAR 5.2 L V10	88	(Italy) Vittorio Viglietti	PA	1–2
(Germany) Tresor Attempto Racing	Audi R8 LMS Evo II	Audi DAR 5.2 L V10	99	(Italy) Andrea Frassineti	P	All
(Germany) Tresor Attempto Racing	Audi R8 LMS Evo II	Audi DAR 5.2 L V10	99	(Israel) Ariel Levi	P	All
(Germany) Tresor Attempto Racing	Audi R8 LMS Evo II	Audi DAR 5.2 L V10	99	(Germany) Alex Aka	P	1, 3–4
(Germany) Tresor Attempto Racing	Audi R8 LMS Evo II	Audi DAR 5.2 L V10	99	(Italy) Rocco Mazzola	P	2
(Italy) / Nova Race Events (Note: Car No. 11 and No. 55 entered as Nova Race Events, and car No. 77 entered as FAEMS Team, which is operated by Nova Race Events.); (Italy) / FAEMS Team	BMW M4 GT3 Evo	BMW P58 3.0 L Twin Turbo I6	11	(Switzerland) Jean-Luc D'Auria	PA	All
(Italy) / Nova Race Events; (Italy) / FAEMS Team	BMW M4 GT3 Evo	BMW P58 3.0 L Twin Turbo I6	11	(Switzerland) Jasin Ferati	PA	All
(Italy) / Nova Race Events; (Italy) / FAEMS Team	BMW M4 GT3 Evo	BMW P58 3.0 L Twin Turbo I6	11	(Italy) Francesco Guerra	PA	All
(Italy) / Nova Race Events; (Italy) / FAEMS Team	BMW M4 GT3 Evo	BMW P58 3.0 L Twin Turbo I6	77	(Italy) Massimo Ciglia	Am	All
(Italy) / Nova Race Events; (Italy) / FAEMS Team	BMW M4 GT3 Evo	BMW P58 3.0 L Twin Turbo I6	77	(Italy) Jenny Sonzogni	Am	1–3
(Italy) / Nova Race Events; (Italy) / FAEMS Team	BMW M4 GT3 Evo	BMW P58 3.0 L Twin Turbo I6	77	(Italy) Alessandro Tarabini	Am	1
(Italy) / Nova Race Events; (Italy) / FAEMS Team	BMW M4 GT3 Evo	BMW P58 3.0 L Twin Turbo I6	77	(Italy) Rodolfo Massaro	Am	2–4
(Italy) / Nova Race Events; (Italy) / FAEMS Team	BMW M4 GT3 Evo	BMW P58 3.0 L Twin Turbo I6	77	(Italy) Alessandro Bracalente	Am	4
(Italy) / Nova Race Events; (Italy) / FAEMS Team	Honda NSX GT3 Evo25	Honda JNC1 3.5 L Twin Turbo V6	55	(Italy) Luca Magnoni	Am	1–2
(Italy) / Nova Race Events; (Italy) / FAEMS Team	Honda NSX GT3 Evo25	Honda JNC1 3.5 L Twin Turbo V6	55	(Italy) Alessandro Marchetti	Am	1–2
(Italy) / Nova Race Events; (Italy) / FAEMS Team	Honda NSX GT3 Evo25	Honda JNC1 3.5 L Twin Turbo V6	55	(Italy) Paolo Rocca	Am	1
(Italy) / Nova Race Events; (Italy) / FAEMS Team	Honda NSX GT3 Evo25	Honda JNC1 3.5 L Twin Turbo V6	55	(Italy) Francesco De Luca	Am	2
(Italy) / Nova Race Events; (Italy) / FAEMS Team	Honda NSX GT3 Evo25	Honda JNC1 3.5 L Twin Turbo V6	55	(Brazil) Pedro Ebrahim	PA	3
(Italy) / Nova Race Events; (Italy) / FAEMS Team	Honda NSX GT3 Evo25	Honda JNC1 3.5 L Twin Turbo V6	55	(Italy) Luca Magnoni	PA	3
(Italy) / Nova Race Events; (Italy) / FAEMS Team	Honda NSX GT3 Evo25	Honda JNC1 3.5 L Twin Turbo V6	55	(Italy) Paolo Rocca	PA	3
(San Marino) Audi Sport Italia	Audi R8 LMS Evo II	Audi DAR 5.2 L V10	12	(Italy) Alessandro Bracalente	Am	1–3
(San Marino) Audi Sport Italia	Audi R8 LMS Evo II	Audi DAR 5.2 L V10	12	(Switzerland) Jody Lambrughi	Am	1–3
(San Marino) Audi Sport Italia	Audi R8 LMS Evo II	Audi DAR 5.2 L V10	12	(Italy) Nicolò Soffiati	Am	1–2
(San Marino) Audi Sport Italia	Audi R8 LMS Evo II	Audi DAR 5.2 L V10	12	(Australia) Johan Hamilton	Am	3
(San Marino) Audi Sport Italia	Audi R8 LMS Evo II	Audi DAR 5.2 L V10	12	(Australia) Johan Hamilton	PA	4
(San Marino) Audi Sport Italia	Audi R8 LMS Evo II	Audi DAR 5.2 L V10	12	(France) Thomas Laurent	PA	4
(San Marino) Audi Sport Italia	Audi R8 LMS Evo II	Audi DAR 5.2 L V10	12	(Italy) Nicolò Soffiati	PA	4
(Switzerland) Stratia Motorsport (Note: Antonelli Motorsport serves as the technical service provider for both Stratia Motorsport and AKM Motorsport.)	Mercedes-AMG GT3 Evo	Mercedes-AMG M159 6.2 L V8	16	(France) Sacha Lehmann	Am	All
(Switzerland) Stratia Motorsport	Mercedes-AMG GT3 Evo	Mercedes-AMG M159 6.2 L V8	16	(Germany) Florian Scholze	Am	All
(Switzerland) Stratia Motorsport	Mercedes-AMG GT3 Evo	Mercedes-AMG M159 6.2 L V8	16	(France) Arno Santamato	Am	1
(Switzerland) Stratia Motorsport	Mercedes-AMG GT3 Evo	Mercedes-AMG M159 6.2 L V8	16	(Netherlands) Colin Caresani	Am	2–4
(San Marino) AKM Motorsport	Mercedes-AMG GT3 Evo	Mercedes-AMG M159 6.2 L V8	64	(Israel) Guy Albag	P	All
(San Marino) AKM Motorsport	Mercedes-AMG GT3 Evo	Mercedes-AMG M159 6.2 L V8	64	(Italy) Lorenzo Ferrari	P	All
(San Marino) AKM Motorsport	Mercedes-AMG GT3 Evo	Mercedes-AMG M159 6.2 L V8	73	(Italy) Giuseppe Guirreri	PA	All
(San Marino) AKM Motorsport	Mercedes-AMG GT3 Evo	Mercedes-AMG M159 6.2 L V8	73	(Italy) Stefano Pedani	PA	All
(San Marino) AKM Motorsport	Mercedes-AMG GT3 Evo	Mercedes-AMG M159 6.2 L V8	73	(China) Liang Jiatong	PA	1–2
(Germany) Grupo Prom Racing Team	Mercedes-AMG GT3 Evo	Mercedes-AMG M159 6.2 L V8	17	(Germany) Hubert Haupt	Am	4
(Germany) Grupo Prom Racing Team	Mercedes-AMG GT3 Evo	Mercedes-AMG M159 6.2 L V8	17	(Mexico) Alfredo Hernández	Am	4
(Thailand) Star Performance	Lamborghini Huracán GT3 Evo 2	Lamborghini DGF 5.2 L V10	18	(Germany) Michael Fischbaum	Am	2, 4
(Thailand) Star Performance	Lamborghini Huracán GT3 Evo 2	Lamborghini DGF 5.2 L V10	18	(Serbia) Miloš Pavlović	Am	2, 4
(Thailand) Star Performance	Lamborghini Huracán GT3 Evo 2	Lamborghini DGF 5.2 L V10	18	(Germany) Florian Spengler	Am	2, 4
(Germany) Huber Motorsport	Porsche 911 GT3 R (992.2)	Porsche M97/80 4.2 L Flat-6	20	(United States) Robert Mau	Am	All
(Germany) Huber Motorsport	Porsche 911 GT3 R (992.2)	Porsche M97/80 4.2 L Flat-6	20	(United States) Jonathan Miller	Am	All
(Germany) Huber Motorsport	Porsche 911 GT3 R (992.2)	Porsche M97/80 4.2 L Flat-6	20	(United States) Chandler Hull	Am	1, 3–4
(Germany) Huber Motorsport	Porsche 911 GT3 R (992.2)	Porsche M97/80 4.2 L Flat-6	20	(Luxembourg) Carlos Rivas	Am	2
(Switzerland) Spirit of Race	Ferrari 296 GT3 Evo	Ferrari F163CE 3.0 L Turbo V6	21	(Italy) Michele Rugolo	Am	All
(Switzerland) Spirit of Race	Ferrari 296 GT3 Evo	Ferrari F163CE 3.0 L Turbo V6	21	(Netherlands) Willem Van der Worm	Am	All
(Switzerland) Spirit of Race	Ferrari 296 GT3 Evo	Ferrari F163CE 3.0 L Turbo V6	21	(Switzerland) Gino Forgione	Am	1–3
(Switzerland) Spirit of Race	Ferrari 296 GT3 Evo	Ferrari F163CE 3.0 L Turbo V6	50	(Spain) Rafael Durán	PA	All
(Switzerland) Spirit of Race	Ferrari 296 GT3 Evo	Ferrari F163CE 3.0 L Turbo V6	50	(South Africa) David Perel	PA	All
(Switzerland) Spirit of Race	Ferrari 296 GT3 Evo	Ferrari F163CE 3.0 L Turbo V6	51	(Italy) Francesco Braschi	PA	All
(Switzerland) Spirit of Race	Ferrari 296 GT3 Evo	Ferrari F163CE 3.0 L Turbo V6	51	(Italy) Riccardo Ponzio	PA	All
(Switzerland) Spirit of Race	Ferrari 296 GT3 Evo	Ferrari F163CE 3.0 L Turbo V6	51	(South Africa) Andrew Rackstraw	PA	All
(Switzerland) Spirit of Race	Ferrari 296 GT3 Evo	Ferrari F163CE 3.0 L Turbo V6	52	(Monaco) Vincent Abril	PA	4
(Switzerland) Spirit of Race	Ferrari 296 GT3 Evo	Ferrari F163CE 3.0 L Turbo V6	52	(Belgium) Laurent De Meeus	PA	4
(Switzerland) Spirit of Race	Ferrari 296 GT3 Evo	Ferrari F163CE 3.0 L Turbo V6	69	(Italy) Fabrizio Fontana	Am	All
(Switzerland) Spirit of Race	Ferrari 296 GT3 Evo	Ferrari F163CE 3.0 L Turbo V6	69	(Italy) Stefano Gai	Am	All
(Switzerland) Spirit of Race	Ferrari 296 GT3 Evo	Ferrari F163CE 3.0 L Turbo V6	83	(United Kingdom) David McDonald	Am	All
(Switzerland) Spirit of Race	Ferrari 296 GT3 Evo	Ferrari F163CE 3.0 L Turbo V6	83	(Denmark) Benny Simonsen	Am	All
(Switzerland) Spirit of Race	Ferrari 296 GT3 Evo	Ferrari F163CE 3.0 L Turbo V6	83	(Spain) Marcos Vivien	Am	1–2, 4
(Italy) Double TT Racing	Ferrari 296 GT3 Evo	Ferrari F163CE 3.0 L Turbo V6	62	(Egypt) Ibrahim Badawy	PA	All
(Italy) Double TT Racing	Ferrari 296 GT3 Evo	Ferrari F163CE 3.0 L Turbo V6	62	(Italy) Leonardo Colavita	PA	All
(Italy) Double TT Racing	Ferrari 296 GT3 Evo	Ferrari F163CE 3.0 L Turbo V6	62	(Belgium) Gilles Renmans	PA	All
(Italy) Gino Motorsport	BMW M4 GT3 Evo	BMW P58 3.0 L Twin Turbo I6	23	(Denmark) Jan Magnussen	P	All
(Italy) Gino Motorsport	BMW M4 GT3 Evo	BMW P58 3.0 L Twin Turbo I6	23	(Denmark) Mathias Villadsen	P	All
(Italy) Gino Motorsport	BMW M4 GT3 Evo	BMW P58 3.0 L Twin Turbo I6	23	(Belgium) Charles Weerts	P	4
(Italy) Dinamic GT	Porsche 911 GT3 R (992.2)	Porsche M97/80 4.2 L Flat-6	24	(Italy) Matteo Cressoni	P	4
(Italy) Dinamic GT	Porsche 911 GT3 R (992.2)	Porsche M97/80 4.2 L Flat-6	24	(Italy) Francesco Simonazzi	P	4
(South Africa) Into Africa Racing by Dragon	Ferrari 296 GT3	Ferrari F163CE 3.0 L Turbo V6	25	(Zimbabwe) Axcil Jefferies	PA	1–3
(South Africa) Into Africa Racing by Dragon	Ferrari 296 GT3	Ferrari F163CE 3.0 L Turbo V6	25	(South Africa) Xolile Letlaka	PA	1–3
(South Africa) Into Africa Racing by Dragon	Ferrari 296 GT3	Ferrari F163CE 3.0 L Turbo V6	25	(South Africa) Stuart White	PA	1–3
(Switzerland) Kessel Racing	Ferrari 296 GT3 Evo	Ferrari F163CE 3.0 L Turbo V6	33	(Turkey) Murat Cuhadaroglu	Am	All
(Switzerland) Kessel Racing	Ferrari 296 GT3 Evo	Ferrari F163CE 3.0 L Turbo V6	33	(Italy) David Fumanelli	Am	All
(Switzerland) Kessel Racing	Ferrari 296 GT3 Evo	Ferrari F163CE 3.0 L Turbo V6	33	(Italy) Marco Pulcini	Am	All
(Switzerland) Kessel Racing	Ferrari 296 GT3 Evo	Ferrari F163CE 3.0 L Turbo V6	93	(Italy) Giacomo Altoè	Am	All
(Switzerland) Kessel Racing	Ferrari 296 GT3 Evo	Ferrari F163CE 3.0 L Turbo V6	93	(Italy) Giovanni Altoè	Am	All
(Switzerland) Kessel Racing	Ferrari 296 GT3 Evo	Ferrari F163CE 3.0 L Turbo V6	93	(United Kingdom) Oscar Ryndziewicz	Am	All
(Italy) Oregon Team	Lamborghini Huracán GT3 Evo 2	Lamborghini DGF 5.2 L V10	36	(France) Enzo Geraci	P	All
(Italy) Oregon Team	Lamborghini Huracán GT3 Evo 2	Lamborghini DGF 5.2 L V10	36	(Italy) Guido Luchetti	P	All
(Italy) Oregon Team	Lamborghini Huracán GT3 Evo 2	Lamborghini DGF 5.2 L V10	36	(Israel) Artem Petrov (Note: Petrov is Russian, but competes under an Israeli licence as Russian national emblems were banned by the FIA following the Russian invasion of Ukraine.)	P	1–2
(Italy) Oregon Team	Lamborghini Huracán GT3 Evo 2	Lamborghini DGF 5.2 L V10	36	(Germany) Maximilian Paul	P	3–4
(Italy) Ebimotors	Porsche 911 GT3 R (992.2)	Porsche M97/80 4.2 L Flat-6	44	(Italy) Alessandro Baccani	Am	All
(Italy) Ebimotors	Porsche 911 GT3 R (992.2)	Porsche M97/80 4.2 L Flat-6	44	(Italy) Leonardo Caglioni	Am	All
(Italy) Ebimotors	Porsche 911 GT3 R (992.2)	Porsche M97/80 4.2 L Flat-6	44	(Italy) Paolo Venerosi	Am	All
(Germany) Rinaldi Racing	Ferrari 296 GT3 Evo	Ferrari F163CE 3.0 L Turbo V6	45	(Italy) Alessandro Balzan	P	All
(Germany) Rinaldi Racing	Ferrari 296 GT3 Evo	Ferrari F163CE 3.0 L Turbo V6	45	(United States) Dylan Medler	P	All
(Italy) Imperiale Racing	Lamborghini Huracán GT3 Evo 2	Lamborghini DGF 5.2 L V10	54	(Republic of Ireland) Alex Denning	PA	All
(Italy) Imperiale Racing	Lamborghini Huracán GT3 Evo 2	Lamborghini DGF 5.2 L V10	54	(Italy) Alessandro Girotti	PA	All
(Italy) Imperiale Racing	Lamborghini Huracán GT3 Evo 2	Lamborghini DGF 5.2 L V10	54	(Italy) Jacopo Guidetti	PA	All
(Italy) Imperiale Racing	Lamborghini Huracán GT3 Evo 2	Lamborghini DGF 5.2 L V10	85	(Italy) Andrea Cola	PA	All
(Italy) Imperiale Racing	Lamborghini Huracán GT3 Evo 2	Lamborghini DGF 5.2 L V10	85	(Argentina) Lautaro De La Iglesia	PA	All
(Italy) Imperiale Racing	Lamborghini Huracán GT3 Evo 2	Lamborghini DGF 5.2 L V10	85	(Hungary) Phillippe Denes	PA	All
(Italy) Raptor Engineering	McLaren 720S GT3 Evo	McLaren M840T 4.0 L Turbo V8	59	(Italy) Alessio Deledda	P	3–4
(Italy) Raptor Engineering	McLaren 720S GT3 Evo	McLaren M840T 4.0 L Turbo V8	59	(Israel) Artem Petrov	P	3–4
(Italy) Raptor Engineering	McLaren 720S GT3 Evo	McLaren M840T 4.0 L Turbo V8	59	(Italy) Riccardo Cazzaniga	P	3
(Italy) Raptor Engineering	McLaren 720S GT3 Evo	McLaren M840T 4.0 L Turbo V8	59	(Belgium) Baptiste Moulin	P	4
(Italy) VSR	Lamborghini Huracán GT3 Evo 2	Lamborghini DGF 5.2 L V10	63	(Italy) Edoardo Liberati	P	All
(Italy) VSR	Lamborghini Huracán GT3 Evo 2	Lamborghini DGF 5.2 L V10	63	(Italy) Mattia Michelotto	P	All
(Italy) VSR	Lamborghini Huracán GT3 Evo 2	Lamborghini DGF 5.2 L V10	63	(Italy) Ignazio Zanon	P	All
(Italy) VSR	Lamborghini Huracán GT3 Evo 2	Lamborghini DGF 5.2 L V10	66	(Belize) Alexander Bowen	P	All
(Italy) VSR	Lamborghini Huracán GT3 Evo 2	Lamborghini DGF 5.2 L V10	66	(Finland) Jesse Salmenautio	P	All
(Italy) VSR	Lamborghini Huracán GT3 Evo 2	Lamborghini DGF 5.2 L V10	66	(United Kingdom) Hugo Cook	P	1, 4
(Italy) VSR	Lamborghini Huracán GT3 Evo 2	Lamborghini DGF 5.2 L V10	66	(Italy) Loris Spinelli	P	2–3
(Italy) DL Racing	Lamborghini Huracán GT3 Evo 2	Lamborghini DGF 5.2 L V10	68	(Italy) Rosario Messina	Am	All
(Italy) DL Racing	Lamborghini Huracán GT3 Evo 2	Lamborghini DGF 5.2 L V10	68	(Italy) Piergiacomo Randazzo	Am	All
(Italy) DL Racing	Lamborghini Huracán GT3 Evo 2	Lamborghini DGF 5.2 L V10	68	(France) Stéphane Tribaudini	Am	1–3
(Italy) DL Racing	Lamborghini Huracán GT3 Evo 2	Lamborghini DGF 5.2 L V10	68	(Italy) Simone Iaquinta	Am	4
(Italy) DL Racing	Lamborghini Huracán GT3 Evo 2	Lamborghini DGF 5.2 L V10	71	(France) Mhedi Bouarfa	PA	1, 3–4
(Italy) DL Racing	Lamborghini Huracán GT3 Evo 2	Lamborghini DGF 5.2 L V10	71	(Paraguay) Miguel María Garcia	PA	1
(Italy) DL Racing	Lamborghini Huracán GT3 Evo 2	Lamborghini DGF 5.2 L V10	71	(Norway) Magnus Gustavsen	PA	1
(Italy) DL Racing	Lamborghini Huracán GT3 Evo 2	Lamborghini DGF 5.2 L V10	71	(Italy) Alberto Clementi Pisani	PA	3–4
(Italy) DL Racing	Lamborghini Huracán GT3 Evo 2	Lamborghini DGF 5.2 L V10	71	(France) Franck Perera	PA	3–4
(Italy) DL Racing	Lamborghini Huracán GT3 Evo 2	Lamborghini DGF 5.2 L V10	71	(France) Mhedi Bouarfa	Am	2
(Italy) DL Racing	Lamborghini Huracán GT3 Evo 2	Lamborghini DGF 5.2 L V10	71	(Paraguay) Miguel María Garcia	Am	2
(Italy) DL Racing	Lamborghini Huracán GT3 Evo 2	Lamborghini DGF 5.2 L V10	71	(Italy) Diego Locanto	Am	2
(Italy) DL Racing	Lamborghini Huracán GT3 Evo 2	Lamborghini DGF 5.2 L V10	72	(Italy) Eliseo Donno	P	All
(Italy) DL Racing	Lamborghini Huracán GT3 Evo 2	Lamborghini DGF 5.2 L V10	72	(Italy) Giacomo Pollini	P	All
(Italy) DL Racing	Lamborghini Huracán GT3 Evo 2	Lamborghini DGF 5.2 L V10	72	(Italy) Luca Segù	P	All
(Italy) Rossocorsa	Ferrari 296 GT3	Ferrari F163CE 3.0 L Turbo V6	74	(Italy) Samuele Buttarelli	PA	All
(Italy) Rossocorsa	Ferrari 296 GT3	Ferrari F163CE 3.0 L Turbo V6	74	(Italy) Stefano Marazzi	PA	All
(Italy) Rossocorsa	Ferrari 296 GT3	Ferrari F163CE 3.0 L Turbo V6	80	(Brazil) Felipinho Bassi Massa	Am	1
(Italy) Rossocorsa	Ferrari 296 GT3	Ferrari F163CE 3.0 L Turbo V6	80	(Italy) Angelo Fontana	Am	1
(Italy) Rossocorsa	Ferrari 296 GT3	Ferrari F163CE 3.0 L Turbo V6	80	(Italy) Niccolò Schirò	Am	1
GT Cup (Division 1)
(Italy) Rossocorsa	Ferrari 296 Challenge	Ferrari F163 3.0 L Turbo V6	107	(Italy) Nicola De Marco	PA	All
(Italy) Rossocorsa	Ferrari 296 Challenge	Ferrari F163 3.0 L Turbo V6	107	(Italy) Raffaele Vitale	PA	All
(Italy) Rossocorsa	Ferrari 296 Challenge	Ferrari F163 3.0 L Turbo V6	232	(United States) Yahn Bernier	Am	3
(Italy) Rossocorsa	Ferrari 296 Challenge	Ferrari F163 3.0 L Turbo V6	232	(Australia) Brian Cook	Am	3
(Italy) Rossocorsa	Ferrari 296 Challenge	Ferrari F163 3.0 L Turbo V6	232	(United States) Roberto Perrina	Am	3
(Switzerland) Spirit of Race	Ferrari 296 Challenge	Ferrari F163 3.0 L Turbo V6	150	(Italy) Federico Al Rifai	PA	All
(Switzerland) Spirit of Race	Ferrari 296 Challenge	Ferrari F163 3.0 L Turbo V6	150	(Italy) Edoardo Barbolini	PA	All
(Switzerland) Spirit of Race	Ferrari 296 Challenge	Ferrari F163 3.0 L Turbo V6	150	(Italy) Simone Patrinicola	PA	All
(Italy) / DL Racing (Note: Car No. 163 entered as DL Racing, and car No. 231 entered as Krypton by DL Racing.); (Italy) / Krypton by DL Racing	Lamborghini Huracán Super Trofeo Evo 2	Lamborghini DGF 5.2 L V10	163	(Italy) Pietro Pio Agoglia	PA	All
(Italy) / DL Racing; (Italy) / Krypton by DL Racing	Lamborghini Huracán Super Trofeo Evo 2	Lamborghini DGF 5.2 L V10	163	(Italy) Mattia Bucci	PA	All
(Italy) / DL Racing; (Italy) / Krypton by DL Racing	Lamborghini Huracán Super Trofeo Evo 2	Lamborghini DGF 5.2 L V10	163	(Italy) Alessandro Cremona	PA	All
(Italy) / DL Racing; (Italy) / Krypton by DL Racing	Ferrari 296 Challenge	Ferrari F163 3.0 L Turbo V6	231	(Italy) Luigi Ferrara	Am	1–3
(Italy) / DL Racing; (Italy) / Krypton by DL Racing	Ferrari 296 Challenge	Ferrari F163 3.0 L Turbo V6	231	(Italy) Francesco Galli	Am	1–3
(Italy) / DL Racing; (Italy) / Krypton by DL Racing	Ferrari 296 Challenge	Ferrari F163 3.0 L Turbo V6	231	(Italy) Simone Iaquinta	Am	3
(Italy) SF Squadra Corse	Lamborghini Huracán Super Trofeo Evo 2	Lamborghini DGF 5.2 L V10	184	(Italy) Matteo Roccadelli	PA	1–2, 4
(Italy) SF Squadra Corse	Lamborghini Huracán Super Trofeo Evo 2	Lamborghini DGF 5.2 L V10	184	(Italy) Luca Franca	PA	1–2
(Italy) SF Squadra Corse	Lamborghini Huracán Super Trofeo Evo 2	Lamborghini DGF 5.2 L V10	184	(Italy) Giacomo Trebbi	PA	1–2
(Italy) SF Squadra Corse	Lamborghini Huracán Super Trofeo Evo 2	Lamborghini DGF 5.2 L V10	184	(Italy) Mattia Lancellotti	PA	4
(Italy) Best Lap	Ferrari 296 Challenge	Ferrari F163 3.0 L Turbo V6	219	(Italy) Luigi Gallo	Am	1–2
(Italy) Best Lap	Ferrari 296 Challenge	Ferrari F163 3.0 L Turbo V6	219	(Italy) Ivan Mari	Am	1–2
(Italy) Best Lap	Ferrari 296 Challenge	Ferrari F163 3.0 L Turbo V6	219	(Italy) Vito Postiglione	Am	1–2
(Italy) Zanasi Racing	Ferrari 296 Challenge	Ferrari F163 3.0 L Turbo V6	269	(Netherlands) Michael Verhagen	Am	3
(Italy) Zanasi Racing	Ferrari 296 Challenge	Ferrari F163 3.0 L Turbo V6	269	(Czech Republic) Hendrik Viol	Am	3
(Italy) Zanasi Racing	Ferrari 296 Challenge	Ferrari F163 3.0 L Turbo V6	269	(Italy) Marco Zanasi	Am	3
GT Cup (Division 2)
(Italy) SP Racing Team	Porsche 992 GT3 Cup (992.1)	Porsche 4.0 L Flat-6	411	(Italy) Federico Bernoni	PA	All
(Italy) SP Racing Team	Porsche 992 GT3 Cup (992.1)	Porsche 4.0 L Flat-6	411	(Italy) Pascal Cardinale	PA	All
(Italy) SP Racing Team	Porsche 992 GT3 Cup (992.1)	Porsche 4.0 L Flat-6	411	(Italy) Gianalberto Coldani	PA	All
(Italy) SP Racing Team	Porsche 992 GT3 Cup (992.1)	Porsche 4.0 L Flat-6	571	(Italy) Massimo Abbati	Am	All
(Italy) SP Racing Team	Porsche 992 GT3 Cup (992.1)	Porsche 4.0 L Flat-6	571	(Italy) Matteo Bergonzini	Am	All
(Italy) SP Racing Team	Porsche 992 GT3 Cup (992.1)	Porsche 4.0 L Flat-6	571	(Greece) Dimitris Deverikos	Am	1–2
(Italy) SP Racing Team	Porsche 992 GT3 Cup (992.1)	Porsche 4.0 L Flat-6	571	(Italy) Stefano Zerbi	Am	3–4
(San Marino) Tsunami RT	Porsche 992 GT3 Cup (992.1)	Porsche 4.0 L Flat-6	419	(Spain) Jamie Casas	PA	4
(San Marino) Tsunami RT	Porsche 992 GT3 Cup (992.1)	Porsche 4.0 L Flat-6	419	(Spain) Miguel González	PA	4
(San Marino) Tsunami RT	Porsche 992 GT3 Cup (992.1)	Porsche 4.0 L Flat-6	419	(Spain) Alonso Sánchez	PA	4
(San Marino) Tsunami RT	Porsche 992 GT3 Cup (992.1)	Porsche 4.0 L Flat-6	577	(Italy) Gianluca Carboni	Am	All
(San Marino) Tsunami RT	Porsche 992 GT3 Cup (992.1)	Porsche 4.0 L Flat-6	577	(Italy) Davide di Benedetto	Am	All
(San Marino) Tsunami RT	Porsche 992 GT3 Cup (992.1)	Porsche 4.0 L Flat-6	577	(Italy) Giuseppe Nicolosi	Am	All
(Italy) SR&R	Ferrari 488 Challenge Evo	Ferrari F154 3.9 L Turbo V8	433	(Italy) Andrea Bodellini	PA	All
(Italy) SR&R	Ferrari 488 Challenge Evo	Ferrari F154 3.9 L Turbo V8	433	(Italy) Giacomo Riva	PA	All
(Italy) SR&R	Ferrari 488 Challenge Evo	Ferrari F154 3.9 L Turbo V8	433	(Republic of Ireland) Lyle Schofield	PA	All
(Italy) SR&R	Ferrari 488 Challenge Evo	Ferrari F154 3.9 L Turbo V8	434	(Italy) Alberto Antonucci	PA	2–3
(Italy) SR&R	Ferrari 488 Challenge Evo	Ferrari F154 3.9 L Turbo V8	434	(Italy) Adriano Bernazzani	PA	2–3
(Italy) SR&R	Ferrari 488 Challenge Evo	Ferrari F154 3.9 L Turbo V8	434	(Italy) Lorenzo Tocci	PA	2–3
(Italy) APEX Competition	Porsche 992 GT3 Cup (992.1)	Porsche 4.0 L Flat-6	488	(Italy) Roberto Benedetti	PA	All
(Italy) APEX Competition	Porsche 992 GT3 Cup (992.1)	Porsche 4.0 L Flat-6	488	(Italy) Danny Santi	PA	All
(Italy) APEX Competition	Porsche 992 GT3 Cup (992.1)	Porsche 4.0 L Flat-6	488	(Italy) Massimiliano Lanza	PA	1–3
(Italy) APEX Competition	Porsche 992 GT3 Cup (992.1)	Porsche 4.0 L Flat-6	488	(Italy) Pierluigi Veronesi	PA	4
(Italy) APEX Competition	Porsche 992 GT3 Cup (992.1)	Porsche 4.0 L Flat-6	531	(Italy) Giovanni Trione	Am	All
(Italy) APEX Competition	Porsche 992 GT3 Cup (992.1)	Porsche 4.0 L Flat-6	531	(Italy) Mauro Trione	Am	All
(Italy) APEX Competition	Porsche 992 GT3 Cup (992.1)	Porsche 4.0 L Flat-6	531	(Italy) Pierluigi Veronesi	Am	1–3
(Italy) APEX Competition	Porsche 992 GT3 Cup (992.1)	Porsche 4.0 L Flat-6	531	(Italy) Valerio Marzi	Am	4
(Italy) Birace Motorsport	Porsche 992 GT3 Cup (992.1)	Porsche 4.0 L Flat-6	533	(Brazil) Ricardo Cesar Alvarez	Am	1–3
(Italy) Birace Motorsport	Porsche 992 GT3 Cup (992.1)	Porsche 4.0 L Flat-6	533	(Brazil) Ciro Paciello	Am	1–3
(Italy) Birace Motorsport	Porsche 992 GT3 Cup (992.1)	Porsche 4.0 L Flat-6	533	(Brazil) Pedro Felipe Perdoncini	Am	1
(Italy) Birace Motorsport	Porsche 992 GT3 Cup (992.1)	Porsche 4.0 L Flat-6	533	(Brazil) João Henrique Gonçalves	Am	2–3
(Italy) ZRS Motorsport	Porsche 992 GT3 Cup (992.1)	Porsche 4.0 L Flat-6	545	(Italy) Francesco Bolzoni	Am	All
(Italy) ZRS Motorsport	Porsche 992 GT3 Cup (992.1)	Porsche 4.0 L Flat-6	545	(Italy) Carlo Contessi	Am	All
(Italy) ZRS Motorsport	Porsche 992 GT3 Cup (992.1)	Porsche 4.0 L Flat-6	545	(Italy) Davide Scannicchio	Am	1
(Italy) ZRS Motorsport	Porsche 992 GT3 Cup (992.1)	Porsche 4.0 L Flat-6	545	(Italy) Francesco Guidi	Am	2–4
Entry Lists:

Icon	Class
GT3 entries
P	Pro Cup
PA	Pro-Am Cup
Am	Am Cup
GT Cup entries
PA	Pro-Am Cup
Am	Am Cup

=== GT3 ===
Team	Car	Engine	No.	Drivers	Class	Rounds
(Italy) VSR	Lamborghini Huracán GT3 Evo 2	Lamborghini DGF 5.2 L V10	6	(United Kingdom) Hugo Cook	P	3–4
(Italy) VSR	Lamborghini Huracán GT3 Evo 2	Lamborghini DGF 5.2 L V10	6	(Republic of Ireland) Alex Denning	P	3–4
(Italy) VSR	Lamborghini Huracán GT3 Evo 2	Lamborghini DGF 5.2 L V10	19	(France) Paul Levet	P	All
(Italy) VSR	Lamborghini Huracán GT3 Evo 2	Lamborghini DGF 5.2 L V10	19	(Norway) Marcus Påverud	P	All
(Italy) VSR	Lamborghini Huracán GT3 Evo 2	Lamborghini DGF 5.2 L V10	63	(United Kingdom) Georgi Dimitrov	P	All
(Italy) VSR	Lamborghini Huracán GT3 Evo 2	Lamborghini DGF 5.2 L V10	63	(Italy) Simone Riccitelli	P	All
(Italy) VSR	Lamborghini Huracán GT3 Evo 2	Lamborghini DGF 5.2 L V10	66	(Italy) Mattia Michelotto	P	All
(Italy) VSR	Lamborghini Huracán GT3 Evo 2	Lamborghini DGF 5.2 L V10	66	(Italy) Ignazio Zanon	P	All
(Italy) BMW Italia Ceccato Racing	BMW M4 GT3 Evo	BMW P58 3.0 L Turbo I6	7	(Germany) Jens Klingmann	P	All
(Italy) BMW Italia Ceccato Racing	BMW M4 GT3 Evo	BMW P58 3.0 L Turbo I6	7	(Switzerland) Raffaele Marciello	P	1
(Italy) BMW Italia Ceccato Racing	BMW M4 GT3 Evo	BMW P58 3.0 L Turbo I6	7	(Germany) Max Hesse	P	2
(Italy) BMW Italia Ceccato Racing	BMW M4 GT3 Evo	BMW P58 3.0 L Turbo I6	7	(Belgium) Ugo de Wilde	P	3–4
(Italy) BMW Italia Ceccato Racing	BMW M4 GT3 Evo	BMW P58 3.0 L Turbo I6	8	(United States) Anthony McIntosh	PA	All
(Italy) BMW Italia Ceccato Racing	BMW M4 GT3 Evo	BMW P58 3.0 L Turbo I6	8	(Canada) Parker Thompson	PA	All
(Germany) Tresor Attempto Racing	Audi R8 LMS Evo II	Audi DAR 5.2 L V10	9	(Israel) Ariel Levi	P	All
(Germany) Tresor Attempto Racing	Audi R8 LMS Evo II	Audi DAR 5.2 L V10	9	(Italy) Rocco Mazzola	P	All
(Germany) Tresor Attempto Racing	Audi R8 LMS Evo II	Audi DAR 5.2 L V10	22	(Italy) Marco Cassarà	Am	All
(Germany) Tresor Attempto Racing	Audi R8 LMS Evo II	Audi DAR 5.2 L V10	22	(Germany) Florian Scholze	Am	1
(Germany) Tresor Attempto Racing	Audi R8 LMS Evo II	Audi DAR 5.2 L V10	22	(Italy) Vittorio Viglietti	Am	2–4
(Germany) Tresor Attempto Racing	Audi R8 LMS Evo II	Audi DAR 5.2 L V10	88	(Italy) Alberto Clementi Pisani	PA	1–2
(Germany) Tresor Attempto Racing	Audi R8 LMS Evo II	Audi DAR 5.2 L V10	88	(Italy) Alberto Di Folco	PA	1–2
(Germany) Tresor Attempto Racing	Audi R8 LMS Evo II	Audi DAR 5.2 L V10	99	(Italy) Andrea Frassineti	P	All
(Germany) Tresor Attempto Racing	Audi R8 LMS Evo II	Audi DAR 5.2 L V10	99	(Germany) Alex Aka	P	1, 3–4
(Italy) Nova Race Events	Honda NSX GT3 Evo25	Honda JNC1 3.5 L Turbo V6	11	(Italy) Luca Magnoni	Am	4
(Italy) Nova Race Events	BMW M4 GT3 Evo	BMW P58 3.0 L Turbo I6	55	(Switzerland) Jasin Ferati	P	All
(Italy) Nova Race Events	BMW M4 GT3 Evo	BMW P58 3.0 L Turbo I6	55	(Brazil) Pedro Ebrahim	P	All
(Italy) FAEMS Team (Note: The FAEMS Team entry is operated by Nova Race Events.)	BMW M4 GT3 Evo	BMW P58 3.0 L Turbo I6	77	(Italy) Giuseppe Forenzi	P	All
(Italy) FAEMS Team	BMW M4 GT3 Evo	BMW P58 3.0 L Turbo I6	77	(Guatemala) Ian Rodríguez	P	All
(San Marino) Audi Sport Italia	Audi R8 LMS Evo II	Audi DAR 5.2 L V10	12	(Italy) Gianluca Giraudi	Am	1
(San Marino) Audi Sport Italia	Audi R8 LMS Evo II	Audi DAR 5.2 L V10	12	(Switzerland) Jody Lambrughi	Am	1
(San Marino) Audi Sport Italia	Audi R8 LMS Evo II	Audi DAR 5.2 L V10	12	(Zimbabwe) Axcil Jefferies	PA	2–4
(San Marino) Audi Sport Italia	Audi R8 LMS Evo II	Audi DAR 5.2 L V10	12	(Lebanon) Rawad Sarriedine	PA	2–4
(Switzerland) Stratia Motorsport	Mercedes-AMG GT3 Evo	Mercedes-AMG M159 6.2 L V8	16	(Russia) Alexey Denisov (Note: Denisov and Samorukov are Russian, but compete as an neutral competitor at rounds 1–3 as Russian national emblems were banned by the FIA following the Russian invasion of Ukraine. Petrov, also a Russian, competes under an Israeli licence for the same reason. The ban was lifted on 13 August 2026.)	Am	All
(Switzerland) Stratia Motorsport	Mercedes-AMG GT3 Evo	Mercedes-AMG M159 6.2 L V8	16	(Italy) Giuseppe Fascicolo	Am	All
(Italy) AKM Motorsport	Mercedes-AMG GT3 Evo	Mercedes-AMG M159 6.2 L V8	64	(Israel) Guy Albag	P	All
(Italy) AKM Motorsport	Mercedes-AMG GT3 Evo	Mercedes-AMG M159 6.2 L V8	73	(Italy) Giuseppe Guirreri	PA	All
(Italy) AKM Motorsport	Mercedes-AMG GT3 Evo	Mercedes-AMG M159 6.2 L V8	73	(Italy) Federico Malvestiti	PA	All
(Italy) AKM Motorsport	Mercedes-AMG GT3 Evo	Mercedes-AMG M159 6.2 L V8	82	(San Marino) Emanuel Colombini	Am	All
(Italy) AKM Motorsport	Mercedes-AMG GT3 Evo	Mercedes-AMG M159 6.2 L V8	82	(San Marino) Emanuele Zonzini	Am	All
(Thailand) Star Performance	Lamborghini Huracán GT3 Evo 2	Lamborghini DGF 5.2 L V10	18	(Germany) Michael Fischbaum	PA	1, 3
(Thailand) Star Performance	Lamborghini Huracán GT3 Evo 2	Lamborghini DGF 5.2 L V10	18	(Serbia) Miloš Pavlović	PA	1, 3
(Switzerland) Spirit of Race	Ferrari 296 GT3 Evo	Ferrari F163CE 3.0 L Turbo V6	21	(Switzerland) Gino Forgione	Am	All
(Switzerland) Spirit of Race	Ferrari 296 GT3 Evo	Ferrari F163CE 3.0 L Turbo V6	21	(Italy) Michele Rugolo	Am	All
(Switzerland) Spirit of Race	Ferrari 296 GT3 Evo	Ferrari F163CE 3.0 L Turbo V6	50	(Spain) Rafael Durán	PA	1–3
(Switzerland) Spirit of Race	Ferrari 296 GT3 Evo	Ferrari F163CE 3.0 L Turbo V6	50	(South Africa) David Perel	PA	1–3
(Switzerland) Spirit of Race	Ferrari 296 GT3 Evo	Ferrari F163CE 3.0 L Turbo V6	51	(Italy) Francesco Braschi	PA	All
(Switzerland) Spirit of Race	Ferrari 296 GT3 Evo	Ferrari F163CE 3.0 L Turbo V6	51	(Belgium) Jef Machiels	PA	All
(Switzerland) Spirit of Race	Ferrari 296 GT3 Evo	Ferrari F163CE 3.0 L Turbo V6	52	(Lebanon) Ziad Ghandour	Am	1
(Switzerland) Spirit of Race	Ferrari 296 GT3 Evo	Ferrari F163CE 3.0 L Turbo V6	69	(Italy) Fabrizio Fontana	Am	All
(Switzerland) Spirit of Race	Ferrari 296 GT3 Evo	Ferrari F163CE 3.0 L Turbo V6	69	(Italy) Stefano Gai	Am	All
(Italy) Double TT Racing	Ferrari 296 GT3 Evo	Ferrari F163CE 3.0 L Turbo V6	62	(Italy) Lorenzo Ferrari	PA	All
(Italy) Double TT Racing	Ferrari 296 GT3 Evo	Ferrari F163CE 3.0 L Turbo V6	62	(Belgium) Gilles Renmans	PA	All
(Italy) Gino Motorsport	BMW M4 GT3 Evo	BMW P58 3.0 L Turbo I6	23	(Denmark) Mathias Villadsen	P	All
(Italy) Gino Motorsport	BMW M4 GT3 Evo	BMW P58 3.0 L Turbo I6	23	(Belgium) Charles Weerts	P	4
(Italy) Easy Race	Ferrari 296 GT3	Ferrari F163CE 3.0 L Turbo V6	26	(Italy) Leonardo Gorini	Am	All
(Italy) Easy Race	Ferrari 296 GT3	Ferrari F163CE 3.0 L Turbo V6	26	(Italy) Mattia Marchiante	Am	All
(Italy) Oregon Team	Lamborghini Huracán GT3 Evo 2	Lamborghini DGF 5.2 L V10	34	(Israel) Artem Petrov	P	1–2
(Italy) Oregon Team	Lamborghini Huracán GT3 Evo 2	Lamborghini DGF 5.2 L V10	34	(Italy) Luca Ghiotto	P	1
(Italy) Oregon Team	Lamborghini Huracán GT3 Evo 2	Lamborghini DGF 5.2 L V10	34	(Italy) Loris Spinelli	P	2
(Italy) Oregon Team	Lamborghini Huracán GT3 Evo 2	Lamborghini DGF 5.2 L V10	34	(Italy) Leonardo Pulcini	P	3
(Italy) Oregon Team	Lamborghini Huracán GT3 Evo 2	Lamborghini DGF 5.2 L V10	34	(Latvia) Patricija Stalidzane	P	3
(Italy) Oregon Team	Lamborghini Huracán GT3 Evo 2	Lamborghini DGF 5.2 L V10	36	(France) Enzo Geraci	P	All
(Italy) Oregon Team	Lamborghini Huracán GT3 Evo 2	Lamborghini DGF 5.2 L V10	36	(Italy) Guido Luchetti	P	All
(Italy) Target Racing	Ferrari 296 GT3	Ferrari F163CE 3.0 L Turbo V6	39	(China) Huilin Han	Am	All
(Japan) Bankcy Racing by Herberth	Porsche 911 GT3 R (992.2)	Porsche M97/80 4.2 L Flat-6	57	(Japan) "Bankcy"	PA	1
(Japan) Bankcy Racing by Herberth	Porsche 911 GT3 R (992.2)	Porsche M97/80 4.2 L Flat-6	57	(United Kingdom) Harry King	PA	1
(Italy) Raptor Engineering	McLaren 720S GT3 Evo	McLaren M840T 4.0 L Turbo V8	59	(Italy) Riccardo Cazzaniga	P	All
(Italy) Raptor Engineering	McLaren 720S GT3 Evo	McLaren M840T 4.0 L Turbo V8	59	(United Kingdom) Dean MacDonald	P	All
(Italy) DL Racing	Lamborghini Huracán GT3 Evo 2	Lamborghini DGF 5.2 L V10	68	(Italy) Piergiacomo Randazzo	Am	All
(Italy) DL Racing	Lamborghini Huracán GT3 Evo 2	Lamborghini DGF 5.2 L V10	68	(France) Stéphane Tribaudini	Am	1–3
(Italy) DL Racing	Lamborghini Huracán GT3 Evo 2	Lamborghini DGF 5.2 L V10	68	(Italy) Kevin Gilardoni	Am	4
(Italy) DL Racing	Lamborghini Huracán GT3 Evo 2	Lamborghini DGF 5.2 L V10	71	(France) Mhedi Bouarfa	PA	All
(Italy) DL Racing	Lamborghini Huracán GT3 Evo 2	Lamborghini DGF 5.2 L V10	71	(Paraguay) Miguel María Garcia	PA	1–2
(Italy) DL Racing	Lamborghini Huracán GT3 Evo 2	Lamborghini DGF 5.2 L V10	71	(Italy) Alberto Clementi Pisani	PA	3–4
(Italy) DL Racing	Lamborghini Huracán GT3 Evo 2	Lamborghini DGF 5.2 L V10	72	(France) Franck Perera	P	All
(Italy) DL Racing	Lamborghini Huracán GT3 Evo 2	Lamborghini DGF 5.2 L V10	72	(Italy) Luca Segù	P	All
(Italy) Imperiale Racing	Lamborghini Huracán GT3 Evo 2	Lamborghini DGF 5.2 L V10	85	(Argentina) Lautaro De La Iglesia	P	All
(Italy) Imperiale Racing	Lamborghini Huracán GT3 Evo 2	Lamborghini DGF 5.2 L V10	85	(Hungary) Phillippe Denes	P	All
(Italy) Villorba Corse	Lamborghini Huracán GT3 Evo 2	Lamborghini DGF 5.2 L V10	90	(United Kingdom) Sandy Mitchell	P	4
(Italy) Villorba Corse	Lamborghini Huracán GT3 Evo 2	Lamborghini DGF 5.2 L V10	90	(Italy) Leonardo Moncini	P	4
Entry Lists:

GT3 entries
Icon	Class
P	Pro Cup
PA	Pro-Am Cup
Am	Am Cup

=== GT Cup ===
Team	Car	Engine	No.	Drivers	Class	Rounds
Division 1
(Italy) Best Lap	Ferrari 296 Challenge	Ferrari F163 3.0 L Turbo V6	101	(Italy) Stefano Comandini	PA	All
(Italy) Best Lap	Ferrari 296 Challenge	Ferrari F163 3.0 L Turbo V6	101	(Italy) Vito Postiglione	PA	All
(Italy) Best Lap	Ferrari 296 Challenge	Ferrari F163 3.0 L Turbo V6	111	(Italy) Alex Frassineti	PA	All
(Italy) Best Lap	Ferrari 296 Challenge	Ferrari F163 3.0 L Turbo V6	111	(Italy) Lorenzo Pegoraro	PA	All
(Italy) Pollini Racing	Lamborghini Huracán Super Trofeo Evo 2	Lamborghini DGF 5.2 L V10	106	(Italy) Giacomo Pollini	PA	All
(Italy) Pollini Racing	Lamborghini Huracán Super Trofeo Evo 2	Lamborghini DGF 5.2 L V10	106	(Italy) Matteo Pollini	PA	All
(Italy) Zanasi Racing	Ferrari 296 Challenge	Ferrari F163 3.0 L Turbo V6	109	(Italy) Andrea Fontana	PA	All
(Italy) Zanasi Racing	Ferrari 296 Challenge	Ferrari F163 3.0 L Turbo V6	109	(Italy) Tommaso Lovati	PA	All
(Italy) Zanasi Racing	Ferrari 296 Challenge	Ferrari F163 3.0 L Turbo V6	119	(Italy) Matteo Sartori	PA	All
(Italy) Zanasi Racing	Ferrari 296 Challenge	Ferrari F163 3.0 L Turbo V6	119	(Italy) Mattia Simonini	PA	All
(Italy) Zanasi Racing	Ferrari 296 Challenge	Ferrari F163 3.0 L Turbo V6	203	(Italy) Giacomo Ghermandi	Am	All
(Italy) Zanasi Racing	Ferrari 296 Challenge	Ferrari F163 3.0 L Turbo V6	203	(Italy) Vittoria Piria	Am	All
(Italy) Zanasi Racing	Ferrari 296 Challenge	Ferrari F163 3.0 L Turbo V6	211	(Italy) Victor Briselli	Am	All
(Italy) Zanasi Racing	Ferrari 296 Challenge	Ferrari F163 3.0 L Turbo V6	211	(Italy) Luca Demarchi	Am	All
(Italy) MRNC12	Ferrari 296 Challenge	Ferrari F163 3.0 L Turbo V6	112	(Italy) Filippo Croccolino	PA	All
(Italy) MRNC12	Ferrari 296 Challenge	Ferrari F163 3.0 L Turbo V6	112	(Italy) Riccardo Paniccia	PA	All
(Italy) MRNC12	Ferrari 296 Challenge	Ferrari F163 3.0 L Turbo V6	121	(Italy) Federica Levy	PA	1
(Italy) MRNC12	Ferrari 296 Challenge	Ferrari F163 3.0 L Turbo V6	121	(Switzerland) Laura Villars	PA	1
(Italy) MRNC12	Ferrari 296 Challenge	Ferrari F163 3.0 L Turbo V6	212	(Italy) Emiliano Pierantoni	Am	All
(Italy) MRNC12	Ferrari 296 Challenge	Ferrari F163 3.0 L Turbo V6	212	(Italy) Lorenzo Nicoli	Am	1–2
(Italy) MRNC12	Ferrari 296 Challenge	Ferrari F163 3.0 L Turbo V6	212	(Italy) Lorenzo Mariani	Am	3
(Italy) MRNC12	Ferrari 296 Challenge	Ferrari F163 3.0 L Turbo V6	212	(Italy) Sabatino Di Mare	Am	4
(Italy) MRNC12	Ferrari 296 Challenge	Ferrari F163 3.0 L Turbo V6	221	(Italy) Federica Levy	Am	2–4
(Italy) MRNC12	Ferrari 296 Challenge	Ferrari F163 3.0 L Turbo V6	221	(Italy) Giammarco Marzialetti	Am	2
(Italy) MRNC12	Ferrari 296 Challenge	Ferrari F163 3.0 L Turbo V6	221	(Switzerland) Laura Villars	Am	3–4
(Italy) Oregon Team	Lamborghini Huracán Super Trofeo Evo 2	Lamborghini DGF 5.2 L V10	114	(Germany) Giuseppe Fico	PA	All
(Italy) Oregon Team	Lamborghini Huracán Super Trofeo Evo 2	Lamborghini DGF 5.2 L V10	114	(Denmark) Milan Rytter	PA	All
(Italy) MM Motorsport	Lamborghini Huracán Super Trofeo Evo 2	Lamborghini DGF 5.2 L V10	117	(Italy) Leonardo Arduini	PA	All
(Italy) MM Motorsport	Lamborghini Huracán Super Trofeo Evo 2	Lamborghini DGF 5.2 L V10	117	(Poland) Michał Bartoszuk	PA	All
(Italy) Rangoni Corse	Lamborghini Huracán Super Trofeo Evo 2	Lamborghini DGF 5.2 L V10	120	(Italy) Davide Gaggianesi	PA	1, 3–4
(Italy) Rangoni Corse	Lamborghini Huracán Super Trofeo Evo 2	Lamborghini DGF 5.2 L V10	120	(Italy) Gabriele Torelli	PA	1, 3–4
(Italy) Double TT Racing	Ferrari 296 Challenge	Ferrari F163 3.0 L Turbo V6	123	(Italy) Giancarlo Fisichella	PA	1–2
(Italy) Double TT Racing	Ferrari 296 Challenge	Ferrari F163 3.0 L Turbo V6	123	(Italy) Davide Roda	PA	1–2
(Italy) CRM Competition	Lamborghini Huracán Super Trofeo Evo 2	Lamborghini DGF 5.2 L V10	147	(Italy) Riccardo Tucci	PA	All
(Italy) CRM Competition	Lamborghini Huracán Super Trofeo Evo 2	Lamborghini DGF 5.2 L V10	251	(Italy) Ettore Carminati	Am	All
(Italy) CRM Competition	Lamborghini Huracán Super Trofeo Evo 2	Lamborghini DGF 5.2 L V10	251	(Italy) Barnardo Pellegrini	Am	2–4
(Switzerland) Spirit of Race	Ferrari 296 Challenge	Ferrari F163 3.0 L Turbo V6	150	(Italy) Edoardo Borelli	PA	All
(Switzerland) Spirit of Race	Ferrari 296 Challenge	Ferrari F163 3.0 L Turbo V6	150	(Colombia) Andres Mendez	PA	All
(Switzerland) Spirit of Race	Ferrari 296 Challenge	Ferrari F163 3.0 L Turbo V6	151	(Italy) Diego Di Fabio	PA	All
(Switzerland) Spirit of Race	Ferrari 296 Challenge	Ferrari F163 3.0 L Turbo V6	151	(Italy) Leonardo Megna	PA	All
(Switzerland) Spirit of Race	Ferrari 296 Challenge	Ferrari F163 3.0 L Turbo V6	188	(Russia) Feder Samorukov	PA	1–3
(Switzerland) Spirit of Race	Ferrari 296 Challenge	Ferrari F163 3.0 L Turbo V6	188	(United Arab Emirates) Federico Al Rifai	PA	1–2
(Switzerland) Spirit of Race	Ferrari 296 Challenge	Ferrari F163 3.0 L Turbo V6	188	(United Kingdom) Joshua Rowledge	PA	3–4
(Switzerland) Spirit of Race	Ferrari 296 Challenge	Ferrari F163 3.0 L Turbo V6	205	(Republic of Ireland) Sean Doyle	Am	4
(Switzerland) Spirit of Race	Ferrari 296 Challenge	Ferrari F163 3.0 L Turbo V6	205	(United Kingdom) Darren Howell	Am	4
(Switzerland) Spirit of Race	Ferrari 296 Challenge	Ferrari F163 3.0 L Turbo V6	282	(Italy) Michele Rugolo	Am	1
(Switzerland) Spirit of Race	Ferrari 296 Challenge	Ferrari F163 3.0 L Turbo V6	282	(Netherlands) Willem Van Der Vorm	Am	1
(Switzerland) Spirit of Race	Ferrari 296 Challenge	Ferrari F163 3.0 L Turbo V6	288	(United Kingdom) Sean Ran	Am	4
(Switzerland) Spirit of Race	Ferrari 296 Challenge	Ferrari F163 3.0 L Turbo V6	288	(United Kingdom) Josh Steed	Am	4
(Italy) / DL Racing (Note: Car No. 163, No. 272 and No. 288 entered as DL Racing, and car No. 231 entered as Krypton by DL Racing.); (Italy) / Krypton by DL Racing	Lamborghini Huracán Super Trofeo Evo 2	Lamborghini DGF 5.2 L V10	163	(Italy) Mattia Bucci	PA	All
(Italy) / DL Racing; (Italy) / Krypton by DL Racing	Lamborghini Huracán Super Trofeo Evo 2	Lamborghini DGF 5.2 L V10	163	(Italy) Pietro Pio Agoglia	PA	1–3
(Italy) / DL Racing; (Italy) / Krypton by DL Racing	Lamborghini Huracán Super Trofeo Evo 2	Lamborghini DGF 5.2 L V10	163	(Italy) Ronnie Stefani	PA	4
(Italy) / DL Racing; (Italy) / Krypton by DL Racing	Lamborghini Huracán Super Trofeo Evo 2	Lamborghini DGF 5.2 L V10	272	(Italy) Ronnie Stefani	Am	1–3
(Italy) / DL Racing; (Italy) / Krypton by DL Racing	Lamborghini Huracán Super Trofeo Evo 2	Lamborghini DGF 5.2 L V10	272	(Italy) Remo Castellarin	Am	1–2
(Italy) / DL Racing; (Italy) / Krypton by DL Racing	Lamborghini Huracán Super Trofeo Evo 2	Lamborghini DGF 5.2 L V10	272	(Italy) Diego Locanto	Am	3
(Italy) / DL Racing; (Italy) / Krypton by DL Racing	Lamborghini Huracán Super Trofeo Evo 2	Lamborghini DGF 5.2 L V10	288	(Italy) Francesco Daniele	Am	All
(Italy) / DL Racing; (Italy) / Krypton by DL Racing	Lamborghini Huracán Super Trofeo Evo 2	Lamborghini DGF 5.2 L V10	288	(Italy) Oliva Gaetano	Am	1–2, 4
(Italy) / DL Racing; (Italy) / Krypton by DL Racing	Lamborghini Huracán Super Trofeo Evo 2	Lamborghini DGF 5.2 L V10	288	(Italy) Francesco Turzo	Am	3
(Italy) / DL Racing; (Italy) / Krypton by DL Racing	Ferrari 296 Challenge	Ferrari F163 3.0 L Turbo V6	231	(Italy) Francesco Galli	Am	All
(Italy) / DL Racing; (Italy) / Krypton by DL Racing	Ferrari 296 Challenge	Ferrari F163 3.0 L Turbo V6	231	(Italy) Simone Iaquinta	Am	3–4
(Italy) SF Squadra Corse	Lamborghini Huracán Super Trofeo Evo 2	Lamborghini DGF 5.2 L V10	164	(Italy) Federico Danova	PA	4
(Italy) SF Squadra Corse	Lamborghini Huracán Super Trofeo Evo 2	Lamborghini DGF 5.2 L V10	164	(Italy) Matteo Roccadelli	PA	4
(Italy) SF Squadra Corse	Lamborghini Huracán Super Trofeo Evo 2	Lamborghini DGF 5.2 L V10	184	(Italy) Pietro Alessi	PA	All
(Italy) SF Squadra Corse	Lamborghini Huracán Super Trofeo Evo 2	Lamborghini DGF 5.2 L V10	184	(Italy) Mattia Lancellotti	PA	All
(Czech Republic) Scuderia Praha	Ferrari 296 Challenge	Ferrari F163 3.0 L Turbo V6	199	(Kyrgyzstan) Aleksei Komarov	PA	3
(Czech Republic) Scuderia Praha	Ferrari 296 Challenge	Ferrari F163 3.0 L Turbo V6	199	(Czech Republic) Josef Král	PA	3
(Italy) Invictus Corse	Lamborghini Huracán Super Trofeo Evo 2	Lamborghini DGF 5.2 L V10	207	(Italy) Francesco Coassin	Am	All
(Italy) Invictus Corse	Lamborghini Huracán Super Trofeo Evo 2	Lamborghini DGF 5.2 L V10	207	(Italy) Angelo Lancelotti	Am	1–3
(Italy) Invictus Corse	Lamborghini Huracán Super Trofeo Evo 2	Lamborghini DGF 5.2 L V10	207	(Venezuela) Jonathan Cecotto	Am	4
(Italy) Villorba Corse	Lamborghini Huracán Super Trofeo Evo 2	Lamborghini DGF 5.2 L V10	208	(San Marino) Luciano Privitelio	Am	1–2, 4
(Italy) Villorba Corse	Lamborghini Huracán Super Trofeo Evo 2	Lamborghini DGF 5.2 L V10	208	(San Marino) Donovan Privitelio	Am	2, 4
(Italy) Villorba Corse	Lamborghini Huracán Super Trofeo Evo 2	Lamborghini DGF 5.2 L V10	209	(Serbia) Petar Matić	Am	1–2, 4
(Italy) Target Racing	Ferrari 296 Challenge	Ferrari F163 3.0 L Turbo V6	216	(Italy) Pierluigi Alessandri	Am	1–2, 4
(Italy) MP Racing	Ferrari 296 Challenge	Ferrari F163 3.0 L Turbo V6	250	(Italy) David Gostner	Am	1, 3–4
(Italy) MP Racing	Ferrari 296 Challenge	Ferrari F163 3.0 L Turbo V6	261	(Italy) Thomas Gostner	Am	1, 3–4
(Italy) MP Racing	Ferrari 296 Challenge	Ferrari F163 3.0 L Turbo V6	273	(Italy) Corinna Gostner	Am	1
Division 2
(Italy) A2 Motorsport	Porsche 992 GT3 Cup (992.1)	Porsche 4.0 L Flat-6	401	(Italy) Davide Larini	PA	All
(Italy) A2 Motorsport	Porsche 992 GT3 Cup (992.1)	Porsche 4.0 L Flat-6	401	(Italy) Fabrio Daminato	PA	1–2
(Italy) A2 Motorsport	Porsche 992 GT3 Cup (992.1)	Porsche 4.0 L Flat-6	401	(Italy) Nicola Larini	PA	3
(Italy) A2 Motorsport	Porsche 992 GT3 Cup (992.1)	Porsche 4.0 L Flat-6	401	(Argentina) Eric Borsani	PA	4
(Italy) ZRS Motorsport	Porsche 992 GT3 Cup (992.1)	Porsche 4.0 L Flat-6	412	(Italy) Alberto Fulgori	PA	All
(Italy) ZRS Motorsport	Porsche 992 GT3 Cup (992.1)	Porsche 4.0 L Flat-6	412	(Italy) Riccardo Cirelli	PA	1
(Italy) ZRS Motorsport	Porsche 992 GT3 Cup (992.1)	Porsche 4.0 L Flat-6	445	(Italy) Carlo Contessi	PA	All
(Italy) ZRS Motorsport	Porsche 992 GT3 Cup (992.1)	Porsche 4.0 L Flat-6	445	(Italy) Sebastiano Pavan	PA	1–2
(Italy) ZRS Motorsport	Porsche 992 GT3 Cup (992.1)	Porsche 4.0 L Flat-6	445	(Italy) Angelo Tomarchio	PA	3
(Italy) Birace Motorsport	Porsche 992 GT3 Cup (992.1)	Porsche 4.0 L Flat-6	429	(Italy) Lodovico Laurini	PA	1–3
(Italy) Birace Motorsport	Porsche 992 GT3 Cup (992.1)	Porsche 4.0 L Flat-6	429	(Italy) Giovanni Stefanin	PA	1–3
(Italy) Birace Motorsport	Porsche 992 GT3 Cup (992.1)	Porsche 4.0 L Flat-6	433	(Italy) Paolo Calcagno	PA	1–3
(Italy) Birace Motorsport	Porsche 992 GT3 Cup (992.1)	Porsche 4.0 L Flat-6	433	(Italy) Roberto Muriglio	PA	1–3
(Italy) Birace Motorsport	Porsche 992 GT3 Cup (992.1)	Porsche 4.0 L Flat-6	568	(Switzerland) Christian Fischer	Am	3
(Italy) Birace Motorsport	Porsche 992 GT3 Cup (992.1)	Porsche 4.0 L Flat-6	568	(United States) Thomas Johnson	Am	3
(Italy) APEX Competition	Porsche 992 GT3 Cup (992.1)	Porsche 4.0 L Flat-6	431	(Italy) Valerio Marzi	PA	2–4
(Italy) APEX Competition	Porsche 992 GT3 Cup (992.1)	Porsche 4.0 L Flat-6	431	(Italy) Danny Sabti	PA	2–4
(Italy) APEX Competition	Porsche 992 GT3 Cup (992.1)	Porsche 4.0 L Flat-6	488	(Italy) Luca Attianese	PA	All
(Italy) APEX Competition	Porsche 992 GT3 Cup (992.1)	Porsche 4.0 L Flat-6	488	(Netherlands) Paul Meijer	PA	All
(Italy) APEX Competition	Porsche 992 GT3 Cup (992.1)	Porsche 4.0 L Flat-6	531	(Italy) Valerio Marzi	Am	1
(Italy) APEX Competition	Porsche 992 GT3 Cup (992.1)	Porsche 4.0 L Flat-6	531	(Italy) Riccardo Romagnoli	Am	1
(Italy) Raptor Engineering	McLaren Artura Trophy Evo	McLaren M630 3.0 L Turbo V6	469	(Italy) Flavio Olivieri	PA	3–4
(Italy) Raptor Engineering	McLaren Artura Trophy Evo	McLaren M630 3.0 L Turbo V6	469	(Italy) Riccardo Tirelli	PA	3–4
(Italy) Raptor Engineering	McLaren Artura Trophy Evo	McLaren M630 3.0 L Turbo V6	559	(Italy) Matteo Cianfoni	Am	All
(Italy) Raptor Engineering	McLaren Artura Trophy Evo	McLaren M630 3.0 L Turbo V6	559	(Italy) Flavio Olivieri	Am	1
(Italy) Raptor Engineering	McLaren Artura Trophy Evo	McLaren M630 3.0 L Turbo V6	559	(Italy) Giovanni Naldi	Am	2–4
(Italy) Raptor Engineering	McLaren Artura Trophy Evo	McLaren M630 3.0 L Turbo V6	569	(Italy) Massimo Navatta	Am	1–2
(Italy) Raptor Engineering	McLaren Artura Trophy Evo	McLaren M630 3.0 L Turbo V6	569	(Italy) Riccardo Tirelli	Am	1–2
(Italy) PS Performance	Porsche 992 GT3 Cup (992.1)	Porsche 4.0 L Flat-6	475	(Italy) Giacomo Rinaldi	PA	2
(Italy) PS Performance	Porsche 992 GT3 Cup (992.1)	Porsche 4.0 L Flat-6	575	(Italy) Lorenzo Bontempelli	Am	1
(Italy) PS Performance	Porsche 992 GT3 Cup (992.1)	Porsche 4.0 L Flat-6	575	(Italy) Luciano Linossi	Am	1
(Italy) Target Racing	McLaren Artura Trophy Evo	McLaren M630 3.0 L Turbo V6	481	(Estonia) Gregor Jeets	PA	1
(Italy) MEGA Motorsport	Porsche 992 GT3 Cup (992.1)	Porsche 4.0 L Flat-6	502	(Italy) Enrico Di Leo	Am	1, 3–4
(Italy) MEGA Motorsport	Porsche 992 GT3 Cup (992.1)	Porsche 4.0 L Flat-6	502	(Italy) "Poppy"	Am	1, 3–4
(Italy) Easy Race (Note: Entered as Master Service in round 2.)	Ferrari 488 Challenge Evo	Ferrari F154 3.9 L Turbo V8	503	(Italy) Lorenzo Bontempelli	Am	2–4
(Italy) Easy Race	Ferrari 488 Challenge Evo	Ferrari F154 3.9 L Turbo V8	503	(Italy) "Linos"	Am	2–4
(France) Storm Grand Prix	Porsche 992 GT3 Cup (992.1)	Porsche 4.0 L Flat-6	505	(France) Mickaël Desmaele	Am	3
(France) Storm Grand Prix	Porsche 992 GT3 Cup (992.1)	Porsche 4.0 L Flat-6	505	(France) Sacha Maguet	Am	3
(Belgium) Speed Lover	Porsche 992 GT3 Cup (992.1)	Porsche 4.0 L Flat-6	517	(Belgium) Wim Meulders	Am	1
(Belgium) Speed Lover	Porsche 992 GT3 Cup (992.1)	Porsche 4.0 L Flat-6	517	(Belgium) Rik Renmans	Am	1
(Italy) SP Racing Team	Porsche 992 GT3 Cup (992.1)	Porsche 4.0 L Flat-6	571	(Italy) Massimo Abbati	Am	All
Entry Lists:

GT Cup entries
Icon	Class
PA	Pro-Am Cup
Am	Am Cup

== Race Results ==
Rnd.		Circuit	Date	GT3			GT Cup			
Rnd.		Circuit	Date	Overall winners	Pro-Am winners	Am winners	Div. 1 Pro-Am winners	Div. 1 Am winners	Div. 2 Pro-Am winners	Div. 2 Am winners
1	R1	(Emilia-Romagna) Imola	25 April	(Italy) No. 63 VSR	(Switzerland) No. 51 Spirit of Race	(Italy) N. 83 AF Corse	(Italy) No. 111 Best Lap	(Switzerland) No. 282 Spirit of Race	(Italy) No. 488 APEX Competition	(Italy) No. 502 MEGA Motorsport
1	R1	(Emilia-Romagna) Imola	25 April	(United Kingdom) Georgi Dimitrov (Italy) Simone Riccitelli	(Italy) Francesco Braschi (Belgium) Jef Machiels	(United Kingdom) Jason Ambrose (United Kingdom) David McDonald (Italy) Francesco Castellacci	(Italy) Alex Frassineti (Italy) Lorenzo Pegoraro	(Italy) Michele Rugolo (Monaco) Willem Van Der Vorm	(Italy) Luca Attianese (Netherlands) Paul Meijer	(Italy) Enrico Di Leo (Italy) "Poppy"
1	R2	(Emilia-Romagna) Imola	26 April	(Italy) No. 7 BMW Italia Ceccato Racing	(Switzerland) No. 51 Spirit of Race	(San Marino) No. 82 AKM Motorsport	(Italy) No. 101 Best Lap	(Italy) No. 211 Zanasi Racing	(Italy) No. 488 APEX Competition	(Italy) No. 571 SP Racing Team
1	R2	(Emilia-Romagna) Imola	26 April	(Germany) Jens Klingmann (Switzerland) Raffaele Marciello	(Italy) Francesco Braschi (Belgium) Jef Machiels	(San Marino) Emanuel Colombini (San Marino) Emanuele Zonzini	(Italy) Stefano Comandini (Italy) Vito Postiglione	(Italy) Victor Briselli (Italy) Luca Demarchi	(Italy) Luca Attianese (Netherlands) Paul Meijer	(Italy) Massimo Abbati
2		(Emilia-Romagna) Misano	10 May	(Germany) No. 45 Rinaldi Racing	(Italy) No. 3 Easy Race	(Italy) No. 26 Easy Race	(Switzerland) No. 150 Spirit of Race	(Italy) No. 231 Krypton by DL Racing	(Italy) No. 488 APEX Competition	(Italy) No. 545 ZRS Motorsport
2		(Emilia-Romagna) Misano	10 May	(Italy) Alessandro Balzan (United States) Dylan Medler	(Italy) Luigi Coluccio (Italy) Mattia Marchiante (Italy) Carlo Tamburini	(Italy) Leonardo Gorini (Italy) Daniel Mancinelli (Italy) Massimo Perrina	(Italy) Federico Al Rifai (Italy) Edoardo Barbolini (Italy) Simone Patrinicola	(Italy) Luigi Ferrara (Italy) Francesco Galli	(Italy) Roberto Benedetti (Italy) Massimiliano Lanza (Italy) Danny Santi	(Italy) Francesco Bolzoni (Italy) Carlo Contessi (Italy) Davide Scannicchio
3	R1	(Rome) Vallelunga	23 May	(Italy) No. 59 Raptor Engineering	(Italy) No. 8 BMW Italia Ceccato Racing	(Switzerland) No. 69 Spirit of Race	(Italy) No. 184 SF Squadra Corse	(Italy) No. 207 Invictus	(Italy) No. 488 APEX Competition	(Italy) No. 571 SP Racing Team
3	R1	(Rome) Vallelunga	23 May	(Italy) Riccardo Cazzaniga (United Kingdom) Dean MacDonald	(United States) Anthony McIntosh (Canada) Parker Thompson	(Italy) Fabrizio Fontana (Italy) Stefano Gai	(Italy) Pietro Alessi (Italy) Mattia Lancellotti	(Italy) Francesco Coassin (Italy) Angelo Lancelotti	(Italy) Luca Attianese (Netherlands) Paul Meijer	(Italy) Massimo Abbati
3	R2	(Rome) Vallelunga	24 May	(Italy) No. 7 BMW Italia Ceccato Racing	(Italy) No. 8 BMW Italia Ceccato Racing	(Germany) No. 22 Tresor Attempto Racing	(Italy) No. 112 MRNC12	(Italy) No. 288 DL Racing	(Italy) No. 488 APEX Competition	(Italy) No. 571 SP Racing Team
3	R2	(Rome) Vallelunga	24 May	(Germany) Max Hesse (Germany) Jens Klingmann	(United States) Anthony McIntosh (Canada) Parker Thompson	(Italy) Marco Cassarà (Italy) Vittorio Viglietti	(Italy) Filippo Croccolino (Italy) Riccardo Paniccia	(Italy) Francesco Daniele (Italy) Oliva Gaetano	(Italy) Luca Attianese (Netherlands) Paul Meijer	(Italy) Massimo Abbati
4		(Lombardy) Monza	21 June	(Italy) No. 63 VSR	(Italy) No. 85 Imperiale Racing	(Switzerland) No. 33 Kessel Racing	(Switzerland) No. 150 Spirit of Race	(Italy) No. 231 Krypton by DL Racing	(Italy) No. 433 SR&R	(Italy) No. 545 ZRS Motorsport
4		(Lombardy) Monza	21 June	(Italy) Edoardo Liberati (Italy) Mattia Michelotto (Italy) Ignazio Zanon	(Turkey) Murat Cuhadaroglu (Italy) David Fumanelli (Italy) Marco Pulcini	(Italy) Andrea Cola (Argentina) Lautaro De La Iglesia (Hungary) Phillippe Denes	(Italy) Federico Al Rifai (Italy) Edoardo Barbolini (Italy) Simone Patrinicola	(Italy) Luigi Ferrara (Italy) Francesco Galli	(Italy) Andrea Bodellini (Italy) Giacomo Riva (Republic of Ireland) Lyle Schofield	(Italy) Francesco Bolzoni (Italy) Carlo Contessi (Italy) Francesco Guidi
5	R1	(Tuscany) Mugello	25 July	(Italy) No. 63 VSR	(Switzerland) No. 51 Spirit of Race	(Italy) No. 82 AKM Motorsport	(Italy) No. 101 Best Lap	(Italy) No. 231 Krypton by DL Racing	(Italy) No. 488 APEX Competition	(Italy) No. 502 MEGA Motorsport
5	R1	(Tuscany) Mugello	25 July	(United Kingdom) Georgi Dimitrov (Italy) Simone Riccitelli	(Italy) Francesco Braschi (Belgium) Jef Machiels	(San Marino) Emanuel Colombini (San Marino) Emanuele Zonzini	(Italy) Stefano Comandini (Italy) Vito Postiglione	(Italy) Francesco Galli (Italy) Simone Iaquinta	(Italy) Luca Attianese (Netherlands) Paul Meijer	(Italy) Enrico Di Leo (Italy) "Poppy"
5	R2	(Tuscany) Mugello	26 July	(Italy) No. 7 BMW Italia Ceccato Racing	(Italy) No. 8 BMW Italia Ceccato Racing	(Germany) No. 22 Tresor Attempto Racing	(Italy) No. 111 Best Lap	(Italy) No. 231 Krypton by DL Racing	(Italy) No. 412 ZRS Motorsport	(Italy) No. 571 SP Racing Team
5	R2	(Tuscany) Mugello	26 July	(Germany) Jens Klingmann (Belgium) Ugo de Wilde	(United States) Anthony McIntosh (Canada) Parker Thompson	(Italy) Marco Cassarà (Italy) Vittorio Viglietti	(Italy) Alex Frassineti (Italy) Lorenzo Pegoraro	(Italy) Francesco Galli (Italy) Simone Iaquinta	(Italy) Alberto Fulgori	(Italy) Massimo Abbati
6		(Emilia-Romagna) Imola	6 September							
7	R1	(Lombardy) Monza	10 October							
7	R2	(Lombardy) Monza	11 October							
8		(Tuscany) Mugello	1 November							
