= 2026 Italian GT Championship Sprint Cup =

Italian motorsports season

The 2026 Italian GT Championship Sprint Cup was the thirty-fifth season of the Italian GT Championship. The season began on 24 April at Imola Circuit and finished on 11 October at Monza Circuit. The races were contested with GT3-spec cars, and GT Cup-spec cars in two different divisions, Division 1 for Ferrari Challenge (296) and Lamborghini Super Trofeo cars and Division 2 for Ferrari Challenge (488), McLaren Artura Trophy and Porsche Carrera Cup cars.

== Calendar ==
Round	Circuit	Date	Map
1	Autodromo Internazionale Enzo e Dino Ferrari, Imola, Emilia-Romagna	24–26 April	2026 Italian GT Championship Sprint Cup is located in Italy
2	ACI Vallelunga Circuit, Campagnano di Roma, Rome	22–24 May	2026 Italian GT Championship Sprint Cup is located in Italy
3	Autodromo Internazionale del Mugello, Mugello, Tuscany	24–26 July	2026 Italian GT Championship Sprint Cup is located in Italy
4	Autodromo Nazionale Monza, Monza, Lombardy	9–11 October	2026 Italian GT Championship Sprint Cup is located in Italy

== Entry list ==
=== GT3 ===
Team	Car	Engine	No.	Drivers	Class	Rounds
(Italy) VSR	Lamborghini Huracán GT3 Evo 2	Lamborghini DGF 5.2 L V10	6	(United Kingdom) Hugo Cook	P	3–4
(Italy) VSR	Lamborghini Huracán GT3 Evo 2	Lamborghini DGF 5.2 L V10	6	(Republic of Ireland) Alex Denning	P	3–4
(Italy) VSR	Lamborghini Huracán GT3 Evo 2	Lamborghini DGF 5.2 L V10	19	(France) Paul Levet	P	All
(Italy) VSR	Lamborghini Huracán GT3 Evo 2	Lamborghini DGF 5.2 L V10	19	(Norway) Marcus Påverud	P	All
(Italy) VSR	Lamborghini Huracán GT3 Evo 2	Lamborghini DGF 5.2 L V10	63	(United Kingdom) Georgi Dimitrov	P	All
(Italy) VSR	Lamborghini Huracán GT3 Evo 2	Lamborghini DGF 5.2 L V10	63	(Italy) Simone Riccitelli	P	All
(Italy) VSR	Lamborghini Huracán GT3 Evo 2	Lamborghini DGF 5.2 L V10	66	(Italy) Mattia Michelotto	P	All
(Italy) VSR	Lamborghini Huracán GT3 Evo 2	Lamborghini DGF 5.2 L V10	66	(Italy) Ignazio Zanon	P	All
(Italy) BMW Italia Ceccato Racing	BMW M4 GT3 Evo	BMW P58 3.0 L Turbo I6	7	(Germany) Jens Klingmann	P	All
(Italy) BMW Italia Ceccato Racing	BMW M4 GT3 Evo	BMW P58 3.0 L Turbo I6	7	(Switzerland) Raffaele Marciello	P	1
(Italy) BMW Italia Ceccato Racing	BMW M4 GT3 Evo	BMW P58 3.0 L Turbo I6	7	(Germany) Max Hesse	P	2
(Italy) BMW Italia Ceccato Racing	BMW M4 GT3 Evo	BMW P58 3.0 L Turbo I6	7	(Belgium) Ugo de Wilde	P	3–4
(Italy) BMW Italia Ceccato Racing	BMW M4 GT3 Evo	BMW P58 3.0 L Turbo I6	8	(United States) Anthony McIntosh	PA	All
(Italy) BMW Italia Ceccato Racing	BMW M4 GT3 Evo	BMW P58 3.0 L Turbo I6	8	(Canada) Parker Thompson	PA	All
(Germany) Tresor Attempto Racing	Audi R8 LMS Evo II	Audi DAR 5.2 L V10	9	(Israel) Ariel Levi	P	All
(Germany) Tresor Attempto Racing	Audi R8 LMS Evo II	Audi DAR 5.2 L V10	9	(Italy) Rocco Mazzola	P	All
(Germany) Tresor Attempto Racing	Audi R8 LMS Evo II	Audi DAR 5.2 L V10	22	(Italy) Marco Cassarà	Am	All
(Germany) Tresor Attempto Racing	Audi R8 LMS Evo II	Audi DAR 5.2 L V10	22	(Germany) Florian Scholze	Am	1
(Germany) Tresor Attempto Racing	Audi R8 LMS Evo II	Audi DAR 5.2 L V10	22	(Italy) Vittorio Viglietti	Am	2–4
(Germany) Tresor Attempto Racing	Audi R8 LMS Evo II	Audi DAR 5.2 L V10	88	(Italy) Alberto Clementi Pisani	PA	1–2
(Germany) Tresor Attempto Racing	Audi R8 LMS Evo II	Audi DAR 5.2 L V10	88	(Italy) Alberto Di Folco	PA	1–2
(Germany) Tresor Attempto Racing	Audi R8 LMS Evo II	Audi DAR 5.2 L V10	99	(Italy) Andrea Frassineti	P	All
(Germany) Tresor Attempto Racing	Audi R8 LMS Evo II	Audi DAR 5.2 L V10	99	(Germany) Alex Aka	P	1, 3–4
(Italy) Nova Race Events	Honda NSX GT3 Evo25	Honda JNC1 3.5 L Turbo V6	11	(Italy) Luca Magnoni	Am	4
(Italy) Nova Race Events	BMW M4 GT3 Evo	BMW P58 3.0 L Turbo I6	55	(Switzerland) Jasin Ferati	P	All
(Italy) Nova Race Events	BMW M4 GT3 Evo	BMW P58 3.0 L Turbo I6	55	(Brazil) Pedro Ebrahim	P	All
(Italy) FAEMS Team (Note: The FAEMS Team entry is operated by Nova Race Events.)	BMW M4 GT3 Evo	BMW P58 3.0 L Turbo I6	77	(Italy) Giuseppe Forenzi	P	All
(Italy) FAEMS Team	BMW M4 GT3 Evo	BMW P58 3.0 L Turbo I6	77	(Guatemala) Ian Rodríguez	P	All
(San Marino) Audi Sport Italia	Audi R8 LMS Evo II	Audi DAR 5.2 L V10	12	(Italy) Gianluca Giraudi	Am	1
(San Marino) Audi Sport Italia	Audi R8 LMS Evo II	Audi DAR 5.2 L V10	12	(Switzerland) Jody Lambrughi	Am	1
(San Marino) Audi Sport Italia	Audi R8 LMS Evo II	Audi DAR 5.2 L V10	12	(Zimbabwe) Axcil Jefferies	PA	2–4
(San Marino) Audi Sport Italia	Audi R8 LMS Evo II	Audi DAR 5.2 L V10	12	(Lebanon) Rawad Sarriedine	PA	2–4
(Switzerland) Stratia Motorsport (Note: Antonelli Motorsport serves as the technical service provider for both Stratia Motorsport and AKM Motorsport.)	Mercedes-AMG GT3 Evo	Mercedes-AMG M159 6.2 L V8	16	(Russia) Alexey Denisov (Note: Denisov and Samorukov are Russian, but compete as an neutral competitor at rounds 1–3 as Russian national emblems were banned by the FIA following the Russian invasion of Ukraine. Petrov, also a Russian, competes under an Israeli licence for the same reason. The ban was lifted on 13 August 2026.)	Am	All
(Switzerland) Stratia Motorsport	Mercedes-AMG GT3 Evo	Mercedes-AMG M159 6.2 L V8	16	(Italy) Giuseppe Fascicolo	Am	All
(Italy) AKM Motorsport	Mercedes-AMG GT3 Evo	Mercedes-AMG M159 6.2 L V8	64	(Israel) Guy Albag	P	All
(Italy) AKM Motorsport	Mercedes-AMG GT3 Evo	Mercedes-AMG M159 6.2 L V8	73	(Italy) Giuseppe Guirreri	PA	All
(Italy) AKM Motorsport	Mercedes-AMG GT3 Evo	Mercedes-AMG M159 6.2 L V8	73	(Italy) Federico Malvestiti	PA	All
(Italy) AKM Motorsport	Mercedes-AMG GT3 Evo	Mercedes-AMG M159 6.2 L V8	82	(San Marino) Emanuel Colombini	Am	All
(Italy) AKM Motorsport	Mercedes-AMG GT3 Evo	Mercedes-AMG M159 6.2 L V8	82	(San Marino) Emanuele Zonzini	Am	All
(Thailand) Star Performance	Lamborghini Huracán GT3 Evo 2	Lamborghini DGF 5.2 L V10	18	(Germany) Michael Fischbaum	PA	1, 3
(Thailand) Star Performance	Lamborghini Huracán GT3 Evo 2	Lamborghini DGF 5.2 L V10	18	(Serbia) Miloš Pavlović	PA	1, 3
(Switzerland) Spirit of Race	Ferrari 296 GT3 Evo	Ferrari F163CE 3.0 L Turbo V6	21	(Switzerland) Gino Forgione	Am	All
(Switzerland) Spirit of Race	Ferrari 296 GT3 Evo	Ferrari F163CE 3.0 L Turbo V6	21	(Italy) Michele Rugolo	Am	All
(Switzerland) Spirit of Race	Ferrari 296 GT3 Evo	Ferrari F163CE 3.0 L Turbo V6	50	(Spain) Rafael Durán	PA	1–3
(Switzerland) Spirit of Race	Ferrari 296 GT3 Evo	Ferrari F163CE 3.0 L Turbo V6	50	(South Africa) David Perel	PA	1–3
(Switzerland) Spirit of Race	Ferrari 296 GT3 Evo	Ferrari F163CE 3.0 L Turbo V6	51	(Italy) Francesco Braschi	PA	All
(Switzerland) Spirit of Race	Ferrari 296 GT3 Evo	Ferrari F163CE 3.0 L Turbo V6	51	(Belgium) Jef Machiels	PA	All
(Switzerland) Spirit of Race	Ferrari 296 GT3 Evo	Ferrari F163CE 3.0 L Turbo V6	52	(Lebanon) Ziad Ghandour	Am	1
(Switzerland) Spirit of Race	Ferrari 296 GT3 Evo	Ferrari F163CE 3.0 L Turbo V6	69	(Italy) Fabrizio Fontana	Am	All
(Switzerland) Spirit of Race	Ferrari 296 GT3 Evo	Ferrari F163CE 3.0 L Turbo V6	69	(Italy) Stefano Gai	Am	All
(Italy) Double TT Racing	Ferrari 296 GT3 Evo	Ferrari F163CE 3.0 L Turbo V6	62	(Italy) Lorenzo Ferrari	PA	All
(Italy) Double TT Racing	Ferrari 296 GT3 Evo	Ferrari F163CE 3.0 L Turbo V6	62	(Belgium) Gilles Renmans	PA	All
(Italy) Gino Motorsport	BMW M4 GT3 Evo	BMW P58 3.0 L Turbo I6	23	(Denmark) Mathias Villadsen	P	All
(Italy) Gino Motorsport	BMW M4 GT3 Evo	BMW P58 3.0 L Turbo I6	23	(Belgium) Charles Weerts	P	4
(Italy) Easy Race	Ferrari 296 GT3	Ferrari F163CE 3.0 L Turbo V6	26	(Italy) Leonardo Gorini	Am	All
(Italy) Easy Race	Ferrari 296 GT3	Ferrari F163CE 3.0 L Turbo V6	26	(Italy) Mattia Marchiante	Am	All
(Italy) Oregon Team	Lamborghini Huracán GT3 Evo 2	Lamborghini DGF 5.2 L V10	34	(Israel) Artem Petrov	P	1–2
(Italy) Oregon Team	Lamborghini Huracán GT3 Evo 2	Lamborghini DGF 5.2 L V10	34	(Italy) Luca Ghiotto	P	1
(Italy) Oregon Team	Lamborghini Huracán GT3 Evo 2	Lamborghini DGF 5.2 L V10	34	(Italy) Loris Spinelli	P	2
(Italy) Oregon Team	Lamborghini Huracán GT3 Evo 2	Lamborghini DGF 5.2 L V10	34	(Italy) Leonardo Pulcini	P	3
(Italy) Oregon Team	Lamborghini Huracán GT3 Evo 2	Lamborghini DGF 5.2 L V10	34	(Latvia) Patricija Stalidzane	P	3
(Italy) Oregon Team	Lamborghini Huracán GT3 Evo 2	Lamborghini DGF 5.2 L V10	36	(France) Enzo Geraci	P	All
(Italy) Oregon Team	Lamborghini Huracán GT3 Evo 2	Lamborghini DGF 5.2 L V10	36	(Italy) Guido Luchetti	P	All
(Italy) Target Racing	Ferrari 296 GT3	Ferrari F163CE 3.0 L Turbo V6	39	(China) Huilin Han	Am	All
(Japan) Bankcy Racing by Herberth	Porsche 911 GT3 R (992.2)	Porsche M97/80 4.2 L Flat-6	57	(Japan) "Bankcy"	PA	1
(Japan) Bankcy Racing by Herberth	Porsche 911 GT3 R (992.2)	Porsche M97/80 4.2 L Flat-6	57	(United Kingdom) Harry King	PA	1
(Italy) Raptor Engineering	McLaren 720S GT3 Evo	McLaren M840T 4.0 L Turbo V8	59	(Italy) Riccardo Cazzaniga	P	All
(Italy) Raptor Engineering	McLaren 720S GT3 Evo	McLaren M840T 4.0 L Turbo V8	59	(United Kingdom) Dean MacDonald	P	All
(Italy) DL Racing	Lamborghini Huracán GT3 Evo 2	Lamborghini DGF 5.2 L V10	68	(Italy) Piergiacomo Randazzo	Am	All
(Italy) DL Racing	Lamborghini Huracán GT3 Evo 2	Lamborghini DGF 5.2 L V10	68	(France) Stéphane Tribaudini	Am	1–3
(Italy) DL Racing	Lamborghini Huracán GT3 Evo 2	Lamborghini DGF 5.2 L V10	68	(Italy) Kevin Gilardoni	Am	4
(Italy) DL Racing	Lamborghini Huracán GT3 Evo 2	Lamborghini DGF 5.2 L V10	71	(France) Mhedi Bouarfa	PA	All
(Italy) DL Racing	Lamborghini Huracán GT3 Evo 2	Lamborghini DGF 5.2 L V10	71	(Paraguay) Miguel María Garcia	PA	1–2
(Italy) DL Racing	Lamborghini Huracán GT3 Evo 2	Lamborghini DGF 5.2 L V10	71	(Italy) Alberto Clementi Pisani	PA	3–4
(Italy) DL Racing	Lamborghini Huracán GT3 Evo 2	Lamborghini DGF 5.2 L V10	72	(France) Franck Perera	P	All
(Italy) DL Racing	Lamborghini Huracán GT3 Evo 2	Lamborghini DGF 5.2 L V10	72	(Italy) Luca Segù	P	All
(Italy) Imperiale Racing	Lamborghini Huracán GT3 Evo 2	Lamborghini DGF 5.2 L V10	85	(Argentina) Lautaro De La Iglesia	P	All
(Italy) Imperiale Racing	Lamborghini Huracán GT3 Evo 2	Lamborghini DGF 5.2 L V10	85	(Hungary) Phillippe Denes	P	All
(Italy) Villorba Corse	Lamborghini Huracán GT3 Evo 2	Lamborghini DGF 5.2 L V10	90	(United Kingdom) Sandy Mitchell	P	4
(Italy) Villorba Corse	Lamborghini Huracán GT3 Evo 2	Lamborghini DGF 5.2 L V10	90	(Italy) Leonardo Moncini	P	4
Entry Lists:

GT3 entries
Icon	Class
P	Pro Cup
PA	Pro-Am Cup
Am	Am Cup

=== GT Cup ===
Team	Car	Engine	No.	Drivers	Class	Rounds
Division 1
(Italy) Best Lap	Ferrari 296 Challenge	Ferrari F163 3.0 L Turbo V6	101	(Italy) Stefano Comandini	PA	All
(Italy) Best Lap	Ferrari 296 Challenge	Ferrari F163 3.0 L Turbo V6	101	(Italy) Vito Postiglione	PA	All
(Italy) Best Lap	Ferrari 296 Challenge	Ferrari F163 3.0 L Turbo V6	111	(Italy) Alex Frassineti	PA	All
(Italy) Best Lap	Ferrari 296 Challenge	Ferrari F163 3.0 L Turbo V6	111	(Italy) Lorenzo Pegoraro	PA	All
(Italy) Pollini Racing	Lamborghini Huracán Super Trofeo Evo 2	Lamborghini DGF 5.2 L V10	106	(Italy) Giacomo Pollini	PA	All
(Italy) Pollini Racing	Lamborghini Huracán Super Trofeo Evo 2	Lamborghini DGF 5.2 L V10	106	(Italy) Matteo Pollini	PA	All
(Italy) Zanasi Racing	Ferrari 296 Challenge	Ferrari F163 3.0 L Turbo V6	109	(Italy) Andrea Fontana	PA	All
(Italy) Zanasi Racing	Ferrari 296 Challenge	Ferrari F163 3.0 L Turbo V6	109	(Italy) Tommaso Lovati	PA	All
(Italy) Zanasi Racing	Ferrari 296 Challenge	Ferrari F163 3.0 L Turbo V6	119	(Italy) Matteo Sartori	PA	All
(Italy) Zanasi Racing	Ferrari 296 Challenge	Ferrari F163 3.0 L Turbo V6	119	(Italy) Mattia Simonini	PA	All
(Italy) Zanasi Racing	Ferrari 296 Challenge	Ferrari F163 3.0 L Turbo V6	203	(Italy) Giacomo Ghermandi	Am	All
(Italy) Zanasi Racing	Ferrari 296 Challenge	Ferrari F163 3.0 L Turbo V6	203	(Italy) Vittoria Piria	Am	All
(Italy) Zanasi Racing	Ferrari 296 Challenge	Ferrari F163 3.0 L Turbo V6	211	(Italy) Victor Briselli	Am	All
(Italy) Zanasi Racing	Ferrari 296 Challenge	Ferrari F163 3.0 L Turbo V6	211	(Italy) Luca Demarchi	Am	All
(Italy) MRNC12	Ferrari 296 Challenge	Ferrari F163 3.0 L Turbo V6	112	(Italy) Filippo Croccolino	PA	All
(Italy) MRNC12	Ferrari 296 Challenge	Ferrari F163 3.0 L Turbo V6	112	(Italy) Riccardo Paniccia	PA	All
(Italy) MRNC12	Ferrari 296 Challenge	Ferrari F163 3.0 L Turbo V6	121	(Italy) Federica Levy	PA	1
(Italy) MRNC12	Ferrari 296 Challenge	Ferrari F163 3.0 L Turbo V6	121	(Switzerland) Laura Villars	PA	1
(Italy) MRNC12	Ferrari 296 Challenge	Ferrari F163 3.0 L Turbo V6	212	(Italy) Emiliano Pierantoni	Am	All
(Italy) MRNC12	Ferrari 296 Challenge	Ferrari F163 3.0 L Turbo V6	212	(Italy) Lorenzo Nicoli	Am	1–2
(Italy) MRNC12	Ferrari 296 Challenge	Ferrari F163 3.0 L Turbo V6	212	(Italy) Lorenzo Mariani	Am	3
(Italy) MRNC12	Ferrari 296 Challenge	Ferrari F163 3.0 L Turbo V6	212	(Italy) Sabatino Di Mare	Am	4
(Italy) MRNC12	Ferrari 296 Challenge	Ferrari F163 3.0 L Turbo V6	221	(Italy) Federica Levy	Am	2–4
(Italy) MRNC12	Ferrari 296 Challenge	Ferrari F163 3.0 L Turbo V6	221	(Italy) Giammarco Marzialetti	Am	2
(Italy) MRNC12	Ferrari 296 Challenge	Ferrari F163 3.0 L Turbo V6	221	(Switzerland) Laura Villars	Am	3–4
(Italy) Oregon Team	Lamborghini Huracán Super Trofeo Evo 2	Lamborghini DGF 5.2 L V10	114	(Germany) Giuseppe Fico	PA	All
(Italy) Oregon Team	Lamborghini Huracán Super Trofeo Evo 2	Lamborghini DGF 5.2 L V10	114	(Denmark) Milan Rytter	PA	All
(Italy) MM Motorsport	Lamborghini Huracán Super Trofeo Evo 2	Lamborghini DGF 5.2 L V10	117	(Italy) Leonardo Arduini	PA	All
(Italy) MM Motorsport	Lamborghini Huracán Super Trofeo Evo 2	Lamborghini DGF 5.2 L V10	117	(Poland) Michał Bartoszuk	PA	All
(Italy) Rangoni Corse	Lamborghini Huracán Super Trofeo Evo 2	Lamborghini DGF 5.2 L V10	120	(Italy) Davide Gaggianesi	PA	1, 3–4
(Italy) Rangoni Corse	Lamborghini Huracán Super Trofeo Evo 2	Lamborghini DGF 5.2 L V10	120	(Italy) Gabriele Torelli	PA	1, 3–4
(Italy) Double TT Racing	Ferrari 296 Challenge	Ferrari F163 3.0 L Turbo V6	123	(Italy) Giancarlo Fisichella	PA	1–2
(Italy) Double TT Racing	Ferrari 296 Challenge	Ferrari F163 3.0 L Turbo V6	123	(Italy) Davide Roda	PA	1–2
(Italy) CRM Competition	Lamborghini Huracán Super Trofeo Evo 2	Lamborghini DGF 5.2 L V10	147	(Italy) Riccardo Tucci	PA	All
(Italy) CRM Competition	Lamborghini Huracán Super Trofeo Evo 2	Lamborghini DGF 5.2 L V10	251	(Italy) Ettore Carminati	Am	All
(Italy) CRM Competition	Lamborghini Huracán Super Trofeo Evo 2	Lamborghini DGF 5.2 L V10	251	(Italy) Barnardo Pellegrini	Am	2–4
(Switzerland) Spirit of Race	Ferrari 296 Challenge	Ferrari F163 3.0 L Turbo V6	150	(Italy) Edoardo Borelli	PA	All
(Switzerland) Spirit of Race	Ferrari 296 Challenge	Ferrari F163 3.0 L Turbo V6	150	(Colombia) Andres Mendez	PA	All
(Switzerland) Spirit of Race	Ferrari 296 Challenge	Ferrari F163 3.0 L Turbo V6	151	(Italy) Diego Di Fabio	PA	All
(Switzerland) Spirit of Race	Ferrari 296 Challenge	Ferrari F163 3.0 L Turbo V6	151	(Italy) Leonardo Megna	PA	All
(Switzerland) Spirit of Race	Ferrari 296 Challenge	Ferrari F163 3.0 L Turbo V6	188	(Russia) Feder Samorukov	PA	1–3
(Switzerland) Spirit of Race	Ferrari 296 Challenge	Ferrari F163 3.0 L Turbo V6	188	(United Arab Emirates) Federico Al Rifai	PA	1–2
(Switzerland) Spirit of Race	Ferrari 296 Challenge	Ferrari F163 3.0 L Turbo V6	188	(United Kingdom) Joshua Rowledge	PA	3–4
(Switzerland) Spirit of Race	Ferrari 296 Challenge	Ferrari F163 3.0 L Turbo V6	205	(Republic of Ireland) Sean Doyle	Am	4
(Switzerland) Spirit of Race	Ferrari 296 Challenge	Ferrari F163 3.0 L Turbo V6	205	(United Kingdom) Darren Howell	Am	4
(Switzerland) Spirit of Race	Ferrari 296 Challenge	Ferrari F163 3.0 L Turbo V6	282	(Italy) Michele Rugolo	Am	1
(Switzerland) Spirit of Race	Ferrari 296 Challenge	Ferrari F163 3.0 L Turbo V6	282	(Netherlands) Willem Van Der Vorm	Am	1
(Switzerland) Spirit of Race	Ferrari 296 Challenge	Ferrari F163 3.0 L Turbo V6	288	(United Kingdom) Sean Ran	Am	4
(Switzerland) Spirit of Race	Ferrari 296 Challenge	Ferrari F163 3.0 L Turbo V6	288	(United Kingdom) Josh Steed	Am	4
(Italy) / DL Racing (Note: Car No. 163, No. 272 and No. 288 entered as DL Racing, and car No. 231 entered as Krypton by DL Racing.); (Italy) / Krypton by DL Racing	Lamborghini Huracán Super Trofeo Evo 2	Lamborghini DGF 5.2 L V10	163	(Italy) Mattia Bucci	PA	All
(Italy) / DL Racing; (Italy) / Krypton by DL Racing	Lamborghini Huracán Super Trofeo Evo 2	Lamborghini DGF 5.2 L V10	163	(Italy) Pietro Pio Agoglia	PA	1–3
(Italy) / DL Racing; (Italy) / Krypton by DL Racing	Lamborghini Huracán Super Trofeo Evo 2	Lamborghini DGF 5.2 L V10	163	(Italy) Ronnie Stefani	PA	4
(Italy) / DL Racing; (Italy) / Krypton by DL Racing	Lamborghini Huracán Super Trofeo Evo 2	Lamborghini DGF 5.2 L V10	272	(Italy) Ronnie Stefani	Am	1–3
(Italy) / DL Racing; (Italy) / Krypton by DL Racing	Lamborghini Huracán Super Trofeo Evo 2	Lamborghini DGF 5.2 L V10	272	(Italy) Remo Castellarin	Am	1–2
(Italy) / DL Racing; (Italy) / Krypton by DL Racing	Lamborghini Huracán Super Trofeo Evo 2	Lamborghini DGF 5.2 L V10	272	(Italy) Diego Locanto	Am	3
(Italy) / DL Racing; (Italy) / Krypton by DL Racing	Lamborghini Huracán Super Trofeo Evo 2	Lamborghini DGF 5.2 L V10	288	(Italy) Francesco Daniele	Am	All
(Italy) / DL Racing; (Italy) / Krypton by DL Racing	Lamborghini Huracán Super Trofeo Evo 2	Lamborghini DGF 5.2 L V10	288	(Italy) Oliva Gaetano	Am	1–2, 4
(Italy) / DL Racing; (Italy) / Krypton by DL Racing	Lamborghini Huracán Super Trofeo Evo 2	Lamborghini DGF 5.2 L V10	288	(Italy) Francesco Turzo	Am	3
(Italy) / DL Racing; (Italy) / Krypton by DL Racing	Ferrari 296 Challenge	Ferrari F163 3.0 L Turbo V6	231	(Italy) Francesco Galli	Am	All
(Italy) / DL Racing; (Italy) / Krypton by DL Racing	Ferrari 296 Challenge	Ferrari F163 3.0 L Turbo V6	231	(Italy) Simone Iaquinta	Am	3–4
(Italy) SF Squadra Corse	Lamborghini Huracán Super Trofeo Evo 2	Lamborghini DGF 5.2 L V10	164	(Italy) Federico Danova	PA	4
(Italy) SF Squadra Corse	Lamborghini Huracán Super Trofeo Evo 2	Lamborghini DGF 5.2 L V10	164	(Italy) Matteo Roccadelli	PA	4
(Italy) SF Squadra Corse	Lamborghini Huracán Super Trofeo Evo 2	Lamborghini DGF 5.2 L V10	184	(Italy) Pietro Alessi	PA	All
(Italy) SF Squadra Corse	Lamborghini Huracán Super Trofeo Evo 2	Lamborghini DGF 5.2 L V10	184	(Italy) Mattia Lancellotti	PA	All
(Czech Republic) Scuderia Praha	Ferrari 296 Challenge	Ferrari F163 3.0 L Turbo V6	199	(Kyrgyzstan) Aleksei Komarov	PA	3
(Czech Republic) Scuderia Praha	Ferrari 296 Challenge	Ferrari F163 3.0 L Turbo V6	199	(Czech Republic) Josef Král	PA	3
(Italy) Invictus Corse	Lamborghini Huracán Super Trofeo Evo 2	Lamborghini DGF 5.2 L V10	207	(Italy) Francesco Coassin	Am	All
(Italy) Invictus Corse	Lamborghini Huracán Super Trofeo Evo 2	Lamborghini DGF 5.2 L V10	207	(Italy) Angelo Lancelotti	Am	1–3
(Italy) Invictus Corse	Lamborghini Huracán Super Trofeo Evo 2	Lamborghini DGF 5.2 L V10	207	(Venezuela) Jonathan Cecotto	Am	4
(Italy) Villorba Corse	Lamborghini Huracán Super Trofeo Evo 2	Lamborghini DGF 5.2 L V10	208	(San Marino) Luciano Privitelio	Am	1–2, 4
(Italy) Villorba Corse	Lamborghini Huracán Super Trofeo Evo 2	Lamborghini DGF 5.2 L V10	208	(San Marino) Donovan Privitelio	Am	2, 4
(Italy) Villorba Corse	Lamborghini Huracán Super Trofeo Evo 2	Lamborghini DGF 5.2 L V10	209	(Serbia) Petar Matić	Am	1–2, 4
(Italy) Target Racing	Ferrari 296 Challenge	Ferrari F163 3.0 L Turbo V6	216	(Italy) Pierluigi Alessandri	Am	1–2, 4
(Italy) MP Racing	Ferrari 296 Challenge	Ferrari F163 3.0 L Turbo V6	250	(Italy) David Gostner	Am	1, 3–4
(Italy) MP Racing	Ferrari 296 Challenge	Ferrari F163 3.0 L Turbo V6	261	(Italy) Thomas Gostner	Am	1, 3–4
(Italy) MP Racing	Ferrari 296 Challenge	Ferrari F163 3.0 L Turbo V6	273	(Italy) Corinna Gostner	Am	1
Division 2
(Italy) A2 Motorsport	Porsche 992 GT3 Cup (992.1)	Porsche 4.0 L Flat-6	401	(Italy) Davide Larini	PA	All
(Italy) A2 Motorsport	Porsche 992 GT3 Cup (992.1)	Porsche 4.0 L Flat-6	401	(Italy) Fabrio Daminato	PA	1–2
(Italy) A2 Motorsport	Porsche 992 GT3 Cup (992.1)	Porsche 4.0 L Flat-6	401	(Italy) Nicola Larini	PA	3
(Italy) A2 Motorsport	Porsche 992 GT3 Cup (992.1)	Porsche 4.0 L Flat-6	401	(Argentina) Eric Borsani	PA	4
(Italy) ZRS Motorsport	Porsche 992 GT3 Cup (992.1)	Porsche 4.0 L Flat-6	412	(Italy) Alberto Fulgori	PA	All
(Italy) ZRS Motorsport	Porsche 992 GT3 Cup (992.1)	Porsche 4.0 L Flat-6	412	(Italy) Riccardo Cirelli	PA	1
(Italy) ZRS Motorsport	Porsche 992 GT3 Cup (992.1)	Porsche 4.0 L Flat-6	445	(Italy) Carlo Contessi	PA	All
(Italy) ZRS Motorsport	Porsche 992 GT3 Cup (992.1)	Porsche 4.0 L Flat-6	445	(Italy) Sebastiano Pavan	PA	1–2
(Italy) ZRS Motorsport	Porsche 992 GT3 Cup (992.1)	Porsche 4.0 L Flat-6	445	(Italy) Angelo Tomarchio	PA	3
(Italy) Birace Motorsport	Porsche 992 GT3 Cup (992.1)	Porsche 4.0 L Flat-6	429	(Italy) Lodovico Laurini	PA	1–3
(Italy) Birace Motorsport	Porsche 992 GT3 Cup (992.1)	Porsche 4.0 L Flat-6	429	(Italy) Giovanni Stefanin	PA	1–3
(Italy) Birace Motorsport	Porsche 992 GT3 Cup (992.1)	Porsche 4.0 L Flat-6	433	(Italy) Paolo Calcagno	PA	1–3
(Italy) Birace Motorsport	Porsche 992 GT3 Cup (992.1)	Porsche 4.0 L Flat-6	433	(Italy) Roberto Muriglio	PA	1–3
(Italy) Birace Motorsport	Porsche 992 GT3 Cup (992.1)	Porsche 4.0 L Flat-6	568	(Switzerland) Christian Fischer	Am	3
(Italy) Birace Motorsport	Porsche 992 GT3 Cup (992.1)	Porsche 4.0 L Flat-6	568	(United States) Thomas Johnson	Am	3
(Italy) APEX Competition	Porsche 992 GT3 Cup (992.1)	Porsche 4.0 L Flat-6	431	(Italy) Valerio Marzi	PA	2–4
(Italy) APEX Competition	Porsche 992 GT3 Cup (992.1)	Porsche 4.0 L Flat-6	431	(Italy) Danny Sabti	PA	2–4
(Italy) APEX Competition	Porsche 992 GT3 Cup (992.1)	Porsche 4.0 L Flat-6	488	(Italy) Luca Attianese	PA	All
(Italy) APEX Competition	Porsche 992 GT3 Cup (992.1)	Porsche 4.0 L Flat-6	488	(Netherlands) Paul Meijer	PA	All
(Italy) APEX Competition	Porsche 992 GT3 Cup (992.1)	Porsche 4.0 L Flat-6	531	(Italy) Valerio Marzi	Am	1
(Italy) APEX Competition	Porsche 992 GT3 Cup (992.1)	Porsche 4.0 L Flat-6	531	(Italy) Riccardo Romagnoli	Am	1
(Italy) Raptor Engineering	McLaren Artura Trophy Evo	McLaren M630 3.0 L Turbo V6	469	(Italy) Flavio Olivieri	PA	3–4
(Italy) Raptor Engineering	McLaren Artura Trophy Evo	McLaren M630 3.0 L Turbo V6	469	(Italy) Riccardo Tirelli	PA	3–4
(Italy) Raptor Engineering	McLaren Artura Trophy Evo	McLaren M630 3.0 L Turbo V6	559	(Italy) Matteo Cianfoni	Am	All
(Italy) Raptor Engineering	McLaren Artura Trophy Evo	McLaren M630 3.0 L Turbo V6	559	(Italy) Flavio Olivieri	Am	1
(Italy) Raptor Engineering	McLaren Artura Trophy Evo	McLaren M630 3.0 L Turbo V6	559	(Italy) Giovanni Naldi	Am	2–4
(Italy) Raptor Engineering	McLaren Artura Trophy Evo	McLaren M630 3.0 L Turbo V6	569	(Italy) Massimo Navatta	Am	1–2
(Italy) Raptor Engineering	McLaren Artura Trophy Evo	McLaren M630 3.0 L Turbo V6	569	(Italy) Riccardo Tirelli	Am	1–2
(Italy) PS Performance	Porsche 992 GT3 Cup (992.1)	Porsche 4.0 L Flat-6	475	(Italy) Giacomo Rinaldi	PA	2
(Italy) PS Performance	Porsche 992 GT3 Cup (992.1)	Porsche 4.0 L Flat-6	575	(Italy) Lorenzo Bontempelli	Am	1
(Italy) PS Performance	Porsche 992 GT3 Cup (992.1)	Porsche 4.0 L Flat-6	575	(Italy) Luciano Linossi	Am	1
(Italy) Target Racing	McLaren Artura Trophy Evo	McLaren M630 3.0 L Turbo V6	481	(Estonia) Gregor Jeets	PA	1
(Italy) MEGA Motorsport	Porsche 992 GT3 Cup (992.1)	Porsche 4.0 L Flat-6	502	(Italy) Enrico Di Leo	Am	1, 3–4
(Italy) MEGA Motorsport	Porsche 992 GT3 Cup (992.1)	Porsche 4.0 L Flat-6	502	(Italy) "Poppy"	Am	1, 3–4
(Italy) Easy Race (Note: Entered as Master Service in round 2.)	Ferrari 488 Challenge Evo	Ferrari F154 3.9 L Turbo V8	503	(Italy) Lorenzo Bontempelli	Am	2–4
(Italy) Easy Race	Ferrari 488 Challenge Evo	Ferrari F154 3.9 L Turbo V8	503	(Italy) "Linos"	Am	2–4
(France) Storm Grand Prix	Porsche 992 GT3 Cup (992.1)	Porsche 4.0 L Flat-6	505	(France) Mickaël Desmaele	Am	3
(France) Storm Grand Prix	Porsche 992 GT3 Cup (992.1)	Porsche 4.0 L Flat-6	505	(France) Sacha Maguet	Am	3
(Belgium) Speed Lover	Porsche 992 GT3 Cup (992.1)	Porsche 4.0 L Flat-6	517	(Belgium) Wim Meulders	Am	1
(Belgium) Speed Lover	Porsche 992 GT3 Cup (992.1)	Porsche 4.0 L Flat-6	517	(Belgium) Rik Renmans	Am	1
(Italy) SP Racing Team	Porsche 992 GT3 Cup (992.1)	Porsche 4.0 L Flat-6	571	(Italy) Massimo Abbati	Am	All
Entry Lists:

GT Cup entries
Icon	Class
PA	Pro-Am Cup
Am	Am Cup

== Race Results ==
Bold indicates overall winners.

=== GT3 ===
Round		Circuit	Date	Pole Position	Pro Winners	Pro-Am Winners	Am Winners
1	R1	(Emilia-Romagna) Autodromo Internazionale Enzo e Dino Ferrari	25 April	(Italy) No. 63 VSR	**(Italy) No. 63 VSR**	(Switzerland) No. 51 Spirit of Race	(Italy) No. 68 DL Racing
1	R1	(Emilia-Romagna) Autodromo Internazionale Enzo e Dino Ferrari	25 April	(United Kingdom) Georgi Dimitrov (Italy) Simone Riccitelli	**(United Kingdom) Georgi Dimitrov** **(Italy) Simone Riccitelli**	(Italy) Francesco Braschi (Belgium) Jef Machiels	(Italy) Piergiacomo Randazzo (France) Stéphane Tribaudini
1	R2	(Emilia-Romagna) Autodromo Internazionale Enzo e Dino Ferrari	26 April	(Japan) No. 57 Bankcy Racing by Herberth	**(Italy) No. 7 BMW Italia Ceccato Racing**	(Switzerland) No. 51 Spirit of Race	(Italy) No. 82 AKM Motorsport
1	R2	(Emilia-Romagna) Autodromo Internazionale Enzo e Dino Ferrari	26 April	(Japan) "Bankcy" (United Kingdom) Harry King	**(Germany) Jens Klingmann** **(Switzerland) Raffaele Marciello**	(Italy) Francesco Braschi (Belgium) Jef Machiels	(San Marino) Emanuel Colombini (San Marino) Emanuele Zonzini
2	R1	(Rome) ACI Vallelunga Circuit	23 May	(Italy) No. 59 Raptor Engineering	**(Italy) No. 59 Raptor Engineering**	(Italy) No. 8 BMW Italia Ceccato Racing	(Switzerland) No. 69 Spirit of Race
2	R1	(Rome) ACI Vallelunga Circuit	23 May	(Italy) Riccardo Cazzaniga (United Kingdom) Dean MacDonald	**(Italy) Riccardo Cazzaniga** **(United Kingdom) Dean MacDonald**	(United States) Anthony McIntosh (Canada) Parker Thompson	(Italy) Fabrizio Fontana (Italy) Stefano Gai
2	R2	(Rome) ACI Vallelunga Circuit	24 May	(Germany) No. 99 Tresor Attempto Racing	**(Italy) No. 7 BMW Italia Ceccato Racing**	(Italy) No. 8 BMW Italia Ceccato Racing	(Germany) No. 22 Tresor Attempto Racing
2	R2	(Rome) ACI Vallelunga Circuit	24 May	(Italy) Andrea Frassineti	**(Germany) Max Hesse** **(Germany) Jens Klingmann**	(United States) Anthony McIntosh (Canada) Parker Thompson	(Italy) Marco Cassarà (Italy) Vittorio Viglietti
3	R1	(Tuscany) Autodromo Internazionale del Mugello	25 July	(Italy) No. 63 VSR	**(Italy) No. 63 VSR**	(Switzerland) No. 51 Spirit of Race	(Italy) No. 82 AKM Motorsport
3	R1	(Tuscany) Autodromo Internazionale del Mugello	25 July	(United Kingdom) Georgi Dimitrov (Italy) Simone Riccitelli	**(United Kingdom) Georgi Dimitrov** **(Italy) Simone Riccitelli**	(Italy) Francesco Braschi (Belgium) Jef Machiels	(San Marino) Emanuel Colombini (San Marino) Emanuele Zonzini
3	R2	(Tuscany) Autodromo Internazionale del Mugello	26 July	(Switzerland) No. 51 Spirit of Race	**(Italy) No. 7 BMW Italia Ceccato Racing**	(Italy) No. 8 BMW Italia Ceccato Racing	(Germany) No. 22 Tresor Attempto Racing
3	R2	(Tuscany) Autodromo Internazionale del Mugello	26 July	(Italy) Francesco Braschi (Belgium) Jef Machiels	**(Germany) Jens Klingmann** **(Belgium) Ugo de Wilde**	(United States) Anthony McIntosh (Canada) Parker Thompson	(Italy) Marco Cassarà (Italy) Vittorio Viglietti
4	R1	(Lombardy) Autodromo Nazionale Monza	10 October	(Italy) No. 23 Gino Motorsport	**(Italy) No. 59 Raptor Engineering**	(Italy) No. 8 BMW Italia Ceccato Racing	(Italy) No. 68 DL Racing
4	R1	(Lombardy) Autodromo Nazionale Monza	10 October	(Denmark) Mathias Villadsen (Belgium) Charles Weerts	**(Italy) Riccardo Cazzaniga** **(United Kingdom) Dean MacDonald**	(United States) Anthony McIntosh (Canada) Parker Thompson	(Italy) Kevin Gilardoni (Italy) Piergiacomo Randazzo
4	R2	(Lombardy) Autodromo Nazionale Monza	11 October	(Italy) No. 59 Raptor Engineering	**(Italy) No. 63 VSR**	(Switzerland) No. 51 Spirit of Race	(Switzerland) No. 69 Spirit of Race
4	R2	(Lombardy) Autodromo Nazionale Monza	11 October	(Italy) Riccardo Cazzaniga (United Kingdom) Dean MacDonald	**(United Kingdom) Georgi Dimitrov** **(Italy) Simone Riccitelli**	(Italy) Francesco Braschi (Belgium) Jef Machiels	(Italy) Fabrizio Fontana (Italy) Stefano Gai

=== GT Cup ===
Round		Circuit	Date	Pole Position	Div. 1 Pro-Am winners	Div. 1 Am winners	Div. 2 Pro-Am winners	Div. 2 Am winners
1	R1	(Emilia-Romagna) Autodromo Internazionale Enzo e Dino Ferrari	25 April	(Italy) No. 184 SF Squadra Corse	**(Italy) No. 111 Best Lap**	(Switzerland) No. 282 Spirit of Race	(Italy) No. 488 APEX Competition	(Italy) No. 502 MEGA Motorsport
1	R1	(Emilia-Romagna) Autodromo Internazionale Enzo e Dino Ferrari	25 April	(Italy) Pietro Alessi (Italy) Mattia Lancellotti	**(Italy) Alex Frassineti** **(Italy) Lorenzo Pegoraro**	(Italy) Michele Rugolo (Monaco) Willem Van Der Vorm	(Italy) Luca Attianese (Netherlands) Paul Meijer	(Italy) Enrico Di Leo (Italy) "Poppy"
1	R2	(Emilia-Romagna) Autodromo Internazionale Enzo e Dino Ferrari	26 April	(Italy) No. 106 Pollini Racing	**(Italy) No. 101 Best Lap**	(Italy) No. 211 Zanasi Racing	(Italy) No. 488 APEX Competition	(Italy) No. 571 SP Racing Team
1	R2	(Emilia-Romagna) Autodromo Internazionale Enzo e Dino Ferrari	26 April	(Italy) Giacomo Pollini (Italy) Matteo Pollini	**(Italy) Stefano Comandini** **(Italy) Vito Postiglione**	(Italy) Victor Briselli (Italy) Luca Demarchi	(Italy) Luca Attianese (Netherlands) Paul Meijer	(Italy) Massimo Abbati
2	R1	(Rome) ACI Vallelunga Circuit	23 May	(Italy) No. 184 SF Squadra Corse	**(Italy) No. 184 SF Squadra Corse**	(Italy) No. 207 Invictus	(Italy) No. 488 APEX Competition	(Italy) No. 571 SP Racing Team
2	R1	(Rome) ACI Vallelunga Circuit	23 May	(Italy) Pietro Alessi (Italy) Mattia Lancellotti	**(Italy) Pietro Alessi** **(Italy) Mattia Lancellotti**	(Italy) Francesco Coassin (Italy) Angelo Lancelotti	(Italy) Luca Attianese (Netherlands) Paul Meijer	(Italy) Massimo Abbati
2	R2	(Rome) ACI Vallelunga Circuit	24 May	(Italy) No. 184 SF Squadra Corse	**(Italy) No. 112 MRNC12**	(Italy) No. 288 DL Racing	(Italy) No. 488 APEX Competition	(Italy) No. 571 SP Racing Team
2	R2	(Rome) ACI Vallelunga Circuit	24 May	(Italy) Pietro Alessi (Italy) Mattia Lancellotti	**(Italy) Filippo Croccolino** **(Italy) Riccardo Paniccia**	(Italy) Francesco Daniele (Italy) Oliva Gaetano	(Italy) Luca Attianese (Netherlands) Paul Meijer	(Italy) Massimo Abbati
3	R1	(Tuscany) Autodromo Internazionale del Mugello	25 July	(Italy) No. 119 Zanasi Racing	**(Italy) No. 101 Best Lap**	(Italy) No. 231 Krypton by DL Racing	(Italy) No. 488 APEX Competition	(Italy) No. 502 MEGA Motorsport
3	R1	(Tuscany) Autodromo Internazionale del Mugello	25 July	(Italy) Matteo Sartori (Italy) Mattia Simonini	**(Italy) Stefano Comandini** **(Italy) Vito Postiglione**	(Italy) Francesco Galli (Italy) Simone Iaquinta	(Italy) Luca Attianese (Netherlands) Paul Meijer	(Italy) Enrico Di Leo (Italy) "Poppy"
3	R2	(Tuscany) Autodromo Internazionale del Mugello	26 July	(Italy) No. 119 Zanasi Racing	**(Italy) No. 111 Best Lap**	(Italy) No. 231 Krypton by DL Racing	(Italy) No. 412 ZRS Motorsport	(Italy) No. 571 SP Racing Team
3	R2	(Tuscany) Autodromo Internazionale del Mugello	26 July	(Italy) Matteo Sartori (Italy) Mattia Simonini	**(Italy) Alex Frassineti** **(Italy) Lorenzo Pegoraro**	(Italy) Francesco Galli (Italy) Simone Iaquinta	(Italy) Alberto Fulgori	(Italy) Massimo Abbati
4	R1	(Lombardy) Autodromo Nazionale Monza	10 October	(Italy) No. 203 Zanasi Racing	**(Italy) No. 101 Best Lap**	(Italy) No. 251 CRM Competition	(Italy) No. 431 APEX Competition	(Italy) No. 559 Raptor Engineering
4	R1	(Lombardy) Autodromo Nazionale Monza	10 October	(Italy) Giacomo Ghermandi (Italy) Vittoria Piria	**(Italy) Stefano Comandini** **(Italy) Vito Postiglione**	(Italy) Ettore Carminati (Italy) Barnardo Pellegrini	(Italy) Valerio Marzi (Italy) Danny Sabti	(Italy) Matteo Cianfoni (Italy) Giovanni Naldi
4	R2	(Lombardy) Autodromo Nazionale Monza	11 October	(Italy) No. 119 Zanasi Racing	**(Italy) No. 119 Zanasi Racing**	(Italy) No. 231 Krypton by DL Racing	(Italy) No. 488 APEX Competition	(Italy) No. 571 SP Racing Team
4	R2	(Lombardy) Autodromo Nazionale Monza	11 October	(Italy) Matteo Sartori (Italy) Mattia Simonini	**(Italy) Matteo Sartori** **(Italy) Mattia Simonini**	(Italy) Francesco Galli (Italy) Simone Iaquinta	(Italy) Luca Attianese (Netherlands) Paul Meijer	(Italy) Massimo Abbati

== Standings ==
=== Drivers' championships ===
==== Scoring system ====
At the end of the season, the lowest race score was dropped. In order to participate in the final rankings of the Championship, each driver must have carried out at least three events.

Position	**1st**	**2nd**	**3rd**	**4th**	**5th**	**6th**	**7th**	**8th**	**9th**	**10th**
Points	20	15	12	10	8	6	4	3	2	1

==== GT3 ====
===== Overall =====
Pos.	Driver	Team	IMO		VAL		MUG		MNZ		Pts	Net Points
Pos.	Driver	Team	R1	R2	R1	R2	R1	R2	R1	R2	Pts	Net Points
1	(Germany) Jens Klingmann	(Italy) BMW Italia Ceccato Racing	2	1	25	1	5	1	13	10	84	84
2	(United Kingdom) Georgi Dimitrov (Italy) Simone Riccitelli	(Italy) VSR	**1**	6	8	3	**1**	9	8	1	86	84
3	(Italy) Riccardo Cazzaniga (United Kingdom) Dean MacDonald	(Italy) Raptor Engineering	26	26	**1**	11	2	28	1	**2**	70	70
4	(Israel) Guy Albag	(Italy) AKM Motorsport	7	7	2	4	DSQ	4	17	17	43	43
5	(Switzerland) Jasin Ferati (Brazil) Pedro Ebrahim	(Italy) Nova Race Events	28	5	6	2	17	8	9	5	42	42
6	(Italy) Giuseppe Forenzi (Guatemala) Ian Rodríguez	(Italy) FAEMS Team	4	3	5	8	16	11	6	Ret	39	39
7	(Italy) Francesco Braschi (Belgium) Jef Machiels	(Switzerland) Spirit of Race	6	8	10	24	4	**6**	5	4	36	36
8	(Italy) Andrea Frassineti	(Germany) Tresor Attempto Racing	8	2	7	**12**	10	27	3	Ret	35	35
9	(Germany) Alex Aka	(Germany) Tresor Attempto Racing	8	2			10	27	3	Ret	31	31
10	(France) Franck Perera (Italy) Luca Segù	(Italy) DL Racing	3	18	15	7	9	3	12	Ret	30	30
11	(United States) Anthony McIntosh (Canada) Parker Thompson	(Italy) BMW Italia Ceccato Racing	12	30	3	9	11	5	4	Ret	30	30
12	(Israel) Ariel Levi (Italy) Rocco Mazzola	(Germany) Tresor Attempto Racing	5	Ret	4	5	7	12	18	22	30	30
13	(France) Paul Levet (Norway) Marcus Påverud	(Italy) VSR	13	4	11	16	12	2	14	Ret	25	25
14	(Denmark) Mathias Villadsen	(Italy) Gino Motorsport	Ret	25	13	13	14	15	**2**	Ret	15	15
15	(Italy) Mattia Michelotto (Italy) Ignazio Zanon	(Italy) VSR	Ret	29	16	6	13	21	10	6	13	13
16	(Italy) Lorenzo Ferrari (Belgium) Gilles Renmans	(Italy) Double TT Racing	11	17	9	10	DNS	DNS	7	7	11	11
17	(Argentina) Lautaro De La Iglesia (Hungary) Phillippe Denes	(Italy) Imperiale Racing	10	9	14	14	8	7	16	12	10	10
18	(Spain) Rafael Durán (South Africa) David Perel	(Switzerland) Spirit of Race	Ret	WD	12	Ret	6	13			6	6
19	(Italy) Fabrizio Fontana (Italy) Stefano Gai	(Switzerland) Spirit of Race	16	15	17	19	DNS	DNS	20	8	3	3
20	(Italy) Alberto Clementi Pisani	(Germany) Tresor Attempto Racing	9	10	Ret	21					3	3
20	(Italy) Alberto Clementi Pisani	(Italy) DL Racing					20	16	23	11	3	3
21	(France) Enzo Geraci (Italy) Guido Luchetti	(Italy) Oregon Team	14	12	22	15	24	20	25	9	2	2
	(France) Mhedi Bouarfa	(Italy) DL Racing	22	28	26	25	20	16	23	11	0	0
	(San Marino) Emanuel Colombini (San Marino) Emanuele Zonzini	(Italy) AKM Motorsport	DNS	14	24	23	15	18	21	13	0	0
	(Italy) Giuseppe Guirreri (Italy) Federico Malvestiti	(Italy) AKM Motorsport	17	23	21	22	Ret	14	26	15	0	0
	(Italy) Piergiacomo Randazzo	(Italy) DL Racing	15	20	23	Ret	18	23	19	14	0	0
	(France) Stéphane Tribaudini	(Italy) DL Racing	15	20	23	Ret	18	23			0	0
	(Italy) Marco Cassarà	(Germany) Tresor Attempto Racing	24	31	20	17	23	17	24	16	0	0
	(Italy) Vittorio Viglietti	(Germany) Tresor Attempto Racing			20	17	23	17	24	16	0	0
	(China) Huilin Han	(Italy) Target Racing	18	16	19	Ret	27	19	29	19	0	0
	(Italy) Leonardo Gorini (Italy) Mattia Marchiante	(Italy) Easy Race	19	19	18	18	19	29	22	Ret	0	0
	(Switzerland) Gino Forgione (Italy) Michele Rugolo	(Switzerland) Spirit of Race	23	21	28	20	28	DSQ	27	Ret	0	0
	(Russia) Alexey Denisov (Italy) Giuseppe Fascicolo	(Switzerland) Stratia Motorsport	21	27	27	28	25	26	30	20	0	0
	(Zimbabwe) Axcil Jefferies (Lebanon) Rawad Sarriedine	(San Marino) Audi Sport Italia			Ret	26	22	24	31	WD	0	0
Not classified
	(Switzerland) Raffaele Marciello	(Italy) BMW Italia Ceccato Racing	2	1							35	0
	(Belgium) Ugo de Wilde	(Italy) BMW Italia Ceccato Racing					5	1	13	10	29	0
	(United Kingdom) Hugo Cook (Republic of Ireland) Alex Denning	(Italy) VSR					3	10	11	3	25	0
	(Germany) Max Hesse	(Italy) BMW Italia Ceccato Racing			25	1					20	0
	(Belgium) Charles Weerts	(Italy) Gino Motorsport							**2**	Ret	15	0
	(Italy) Alberto Di Folco	(Germany) Tresor Attempto Racing	9	10	Ret	21					3	0
	(Japan) "Bankcy" (United Kingdom) Harry King	(Japan) Bankcy Racing by Herberth	25	**11**							0	0
	(Israel) Artem Petrov	(Italy) Oregon Team	Ret	13	Ret	27					0	0
	(Italy) Luca Ghiotto	(Italy) Oregon Team	Ret	13							0	0
	(Italy) Kevin Gilardoni	(Italy) DL Racing							19	14	0	0
	(United Kingdom) Sandy Mitchell (Italy) Leonardo Moncini	(Italy) Villorba Corse							15	18	0	0
	(Italy) Gianluca Giraudi (Switzerland) Jody Lambrughi	(San Marino) Audi Sport Italia	20	24							0	0
	(Paraguay) Miguel María Garcia	(Italy) DL Racing	22	28	26	25					0	0
	(Italy) Leonardo Pulcini (Latvia) Patricija Stalidzane	(Italy) Oregon Team					24	22			0	0
	(Lebanon) Ziad Ghandour	(Switzerland) Spirit of Race	27	22							0	0
	(Germany) Florian Scholze	(Germany) Tresor Attempto Racing	24	31							0	0
	(Germany) Michael Fischbaum (Serbia) Miloš Pavlović	(Thailand) Star Performance	Ret	Ret			26	25			0	0
	(Italy) Loris Spinelli	(Italy) Oregon Team			Ret	27					0	0
Pos.	Driver	Team	R1	R2	R1	R2	R1	R2	R1	R2	Pts	Net Points
Pos.	Driver	Team	IMO		VAL		MUG		MNZ		Pts	Net Points

Colour	Result
Gold	Winner
Silver	Second place
Bronze	Third place
Green	Points classification
Blue	Non-points classification
Blue	Non-classified finish (NC)
Purple	Retired, not classified (Ret)
Red	Did not qualify (DNQ)
Red	Did not pre-qualify (DNPQ)
Black	Disqualified (DSQ)
White	Did not start (DNS)
White	Withdrew (WD)
White	Race cancelled (C)
Blank	Did not practice (DNP)
Blank	Did not arrive (DNA)
Blank	Excluded (EX)

**Bold** - Pole position/fastest qualifying time
Italics - Fastest lap

===== Pro-Am =====
Pos.	Driver	Team	IMO		VAL		MUG		MNZ		Pts	Net Points
Pos.	Driver	Team	R1	R2	R1	R2	R1	R2	R1	R2	Pts	Net Points
1	(Italy) Francesco Braschi (Belgium) Jef Machiels	(Switzerland) Spirit of Race	**1**	1	3	5	**1**	**2**	**2**	**1**	130	122
2	(United States) Anthony McIntosh (Canada) Parker Thompson	(Italy) BMW Italia Ceccato Racing	4	7	**1**	**1**	3	1	1	Ret	106	106
3	(Italy) Alberto Clementi Pisani	(Germany) Tresor Attempto Racing	2	2	Ret	3					82	82
3	(Italy) Alberto Clementi Pisani	(Italy) DL Racing					4	5	4	3	82	82
4	(Italy) Lorenzo Ferrari (Belgium) Gilles Renmans	(Italy) Double TT Racing	3	4	2	2	DNS	DNS	3	2	79	79
5	(Italy) Giuseppe Guirreri (Italy) Federico Malvestiti	(Italy) AKM Motorsport	5	5	5	4	Ret	4	5	4	62	62
6	(France) Mhedi Bouarfa	(Italy) DL Racing	6	6	6	6	4	5	4	3	64	58
7	(Spain) Rafael Durán (South Africa) David Perel	(Switzerland) Spirit of Race	Ret	WD	4	Ret	2	3			37	37
8	(Zimbabwe) Axcil Jefferies (Lebanon) Rawad Sarriedine	(San Marino) Audi Sport Italia			Ret	7	5	6	6	WD	24	24
Not classified
	(Italy) Alberto Di Folco	(Germany) Tresor Attempto Racing	2	2	Ret	3					42	0
	(Paraguay) Miguel María Garcia	(Italy) DL Racing	6	6	6	6					24	0
	(Japan) "Bankcy" (United Kingdom) Harry King	(Japan) Bankcy Racing by Herberth	7	**3**							16	0
	(Germany) Michael Fischbaum (Serbia) Miloš Pavlović	(Thailand) Star Performance	Ret	Ret			6	7			10	0
Pos.	Driver	Team	R1	R2	R1	R2	R1	R2	R1	R2	Pts	Net Points
Pos.	Driver	Team	IMO		VAL		MUG		MNZ		Pts	Net Points

===== Am =====
Pos.	Driver	Team	IMO		VAL		MUG		MNZ		Pts	Net Points
Pos.	Driver	Team	R1	R2	R1	R2	R1	R2	R1	R2	Pts	Net Points
1	(Italy) Fabrizio Fontana (Italy) Stefano Gai	(Switzerland) Spirit of Race	2	**2**	1	3	DNS	DNS	2	1	97	97
2	(San Marino) Emanuel Colombini (San Marino) Emanuele Zonzini	(Italy) AKM Motorsport	DNS	1	6	5	**1**	2	3	2	96	96
3	(Italy) Piergiacomo Randazzo	(Italy) DL Racing	**1**	5	5	Ret	2	4	1	**3**	93	93
4	(Italy) Marco Cassarà	(Germany) Tresor Attempto Racing	8	10	4	1	4	1	5	4	82	81
5	(Italy) Vittorio Viglietti	(Germany) Tresor Attempto Racing			4	1	4	1	5	4	78	78
6	(Italy) Leonardo Gorini (Italy) Mattia Marchiante	(Italy) Easy Race	4	4	2	2	3	6	4	Ret	78	78
7	(China) Huilin Han	(Italy) Target Racing	3	3	3	**Ret**	6	3	8	5	65	65
8	(France) Stéphane Tribaudini	(Italy) DL Racing	**1**	5	5	Ret	2	4			61	61
9	(Russia) Alexey Denisov (Italy) Giuseppe Fascicolo	(Switzerland) Stratia Motorsport	6	9	7	6	5	5	9	6	42	40
10	(Switzerland) Gino Forgione (Italy) Michele Rugolo	(Switzerland) Spirit of Race	7	6	**8**	4	7	**DSQ**	**6**	Ret	33	33
Not classified
	(Italy) Kevin Gilardoni	(Italy) DL Racing							1	**3**	32	0
	(Italy) Gianluca Giraudi (Switzerland) Jody Lambrughi	(San Marino) Audi Sport Italia	5	8							11	0
	(Italy) Luca Magnoni	(Italy) Nova Race Events							7	7	8	0
	(Lebanon) Ziad Ghandour	(Switzerland) Spirit of Race	9	7							6	0
	(Germany) Florian Scholze	(Germany) Tresor Attempto Racing	8	10							4	0
Pos.	Driver	Team	R1	R2	R1	R2	R1	R2	R1	R2	Pts	Net Points
Pos.	Driver	Team	IMO		VAL		MUG		MNZ		Pts	Net Points

== See also ==
- 2026 Italian GT Championship
- 2026 Italian GT Championship Endurance Cup
- 2026 GT4 Italian Series
