= Emanuel Colombini =

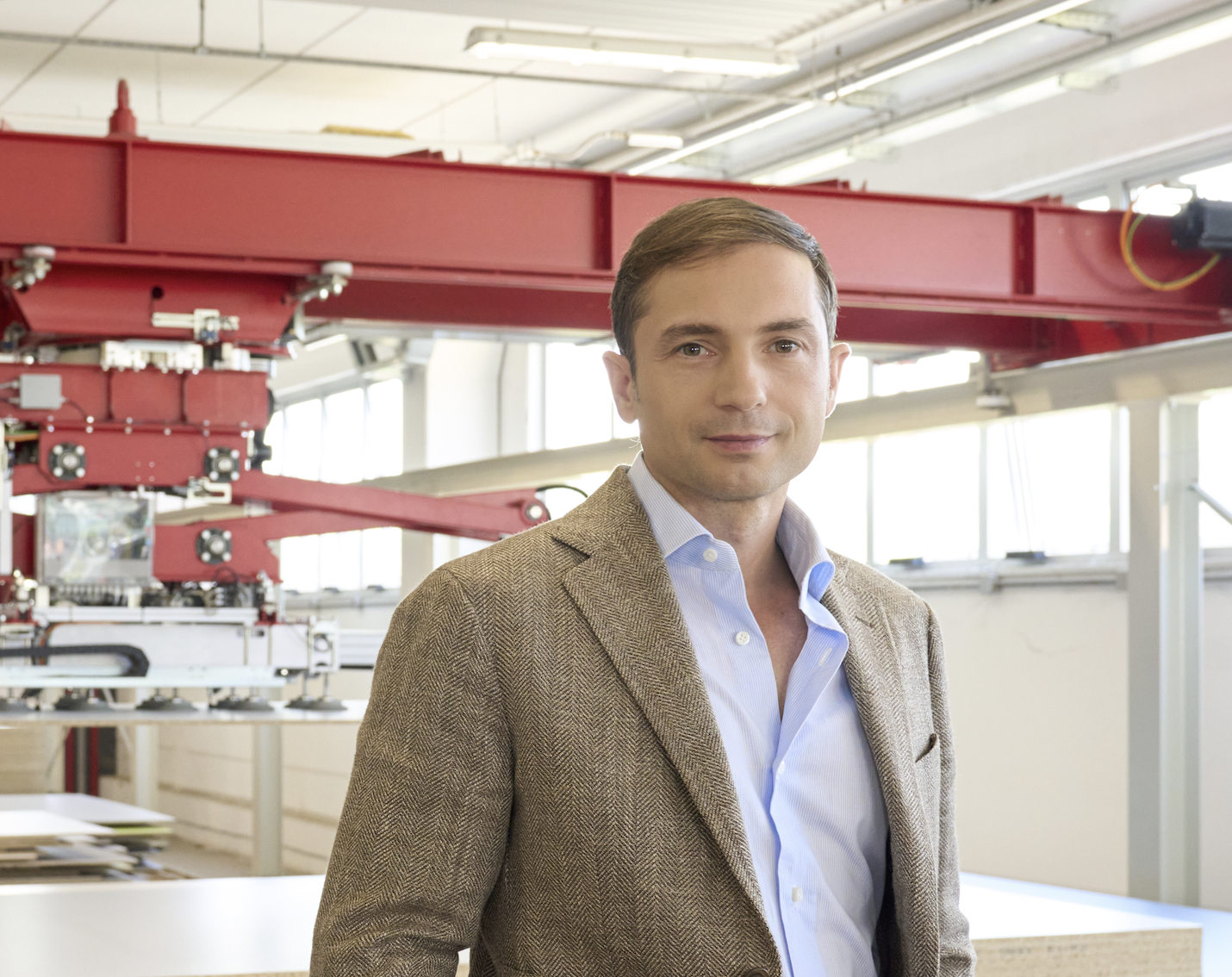
- Born: 28 February 1978 (age 48); San Marino

Emanuel Colombini (born 28 February 1978) is an entrepreneur from San Marino. He is the president of Colombini Group, founder and president of Eccentrica Cars, president of the Chamber of Commerce of San Marino, member of the Assarredo Presidency Council and member of the Board of Directors of Banca Sammarinese di Investimento. He is also a driver of Lamborghini Super Trofeo.

== Career ==
=== Colombini Group ===
Colombini began his career early, joining the family-run company Colombini Group, an industrial group in the furniture industry employing 1250 people. Emanuel served as the CEO of the group from 2003 to 2019 before his promotion to President.

In 2010, Febal, a kitchen brand, joined the group and rebranded as Febal Casa, introducing matching furniture systems for the entire home. In 2021, Colombini oversaw the majority acquisition of Bontempi Casa and Ingenia. The Group now boasts seven brands in its portfolio: Colombini Casa, Febal Casa, Bontempi Casa, Ingenia Casa, Rossana, Offic'è, and Colombini Group Contract.

=== Eccentrica Cars ===
In 2023, Colombini founded Eccentrica Cars, a start-up dedicated to supercar and hypercar restomod projects. His company's first prototype was presented in July 2023 and was built from an early 1990s Lamborghini Diablo. The body of the donor car was restyled by the Borromeodesilva design studio. The project was a joint effort by automotive and tech industry-leading brands the likes of Pirelli, Brembo, Marantz, Capristo, and Alcantara.

=== Investments ===
Colombini has also been active as an investor in venture capital and private equity. His investment focus is on start-ups and projects primarily in the design field, as well as in various other sectors including technology, housing, catering, education, hospitality, and food.

=== Institutional positions ===
Additionally, Colombini holds several institutional positions. Since 2014, he has been a member of the Board of Directors of Banca Sammarinese di Investimento. He also serves as the President of the Chamber of Commerce of San Marino and is a member of the Assarredo Presidency Council.

== Participation in sporting events ==
=== Lamborghini Super Trofeo Europe and World Championship ===
In the 2022 season, Colombini competed in the Lamborghini Super Trofeo Europe, participating in the Pro-Am category alongside Emanuele Zonzini. The duo scored points in the opening race in Imola and were also confirmed for the 2023 season, racing for team Iron Lynx.

During the final round of the Lamborghini Super Trofeo 2023 season at the Autodromo Vallelunga, the team awarded third place in both the European and the World championship of the Lamborghini Super Trofeo.
