= Andrea Frassineti =

Italian racing driver (born 2006)

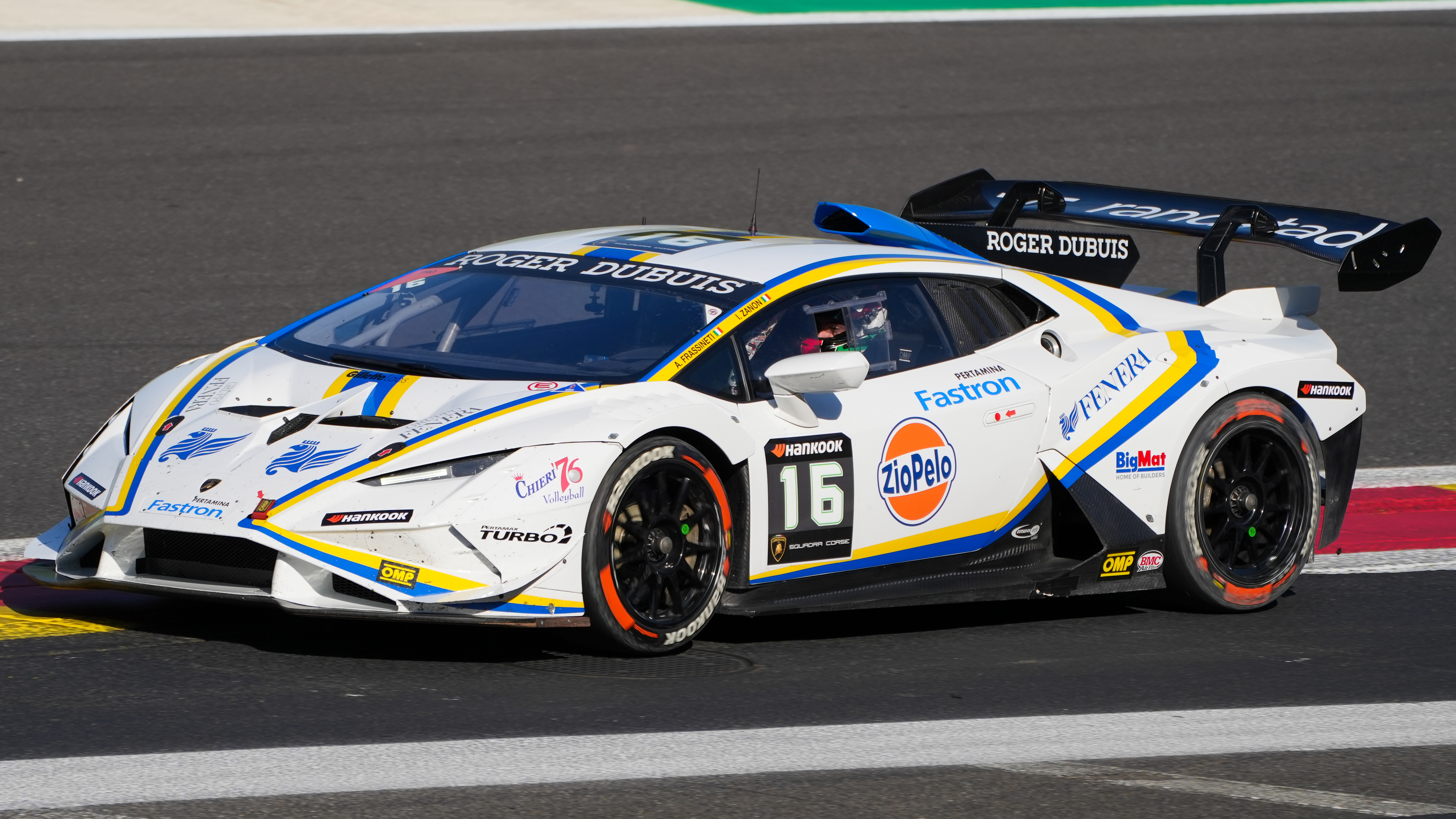
- Frassineti in 2024
- Nationality: (Italy) Italian
- Born: 7 September 2006 (age 20) Faenza, Italy
- Categorisation: FIA Silver

Championship titles
- 2025: Italian GT Championship Sprint Cup – GT3

Andrea Frassineti (born 7 September 2006) is an Italian racing driver who last competed for Tresor Attempto Racing in the GT World Challenge Europe and Italian GT Championship. Frassineti won the 2025 Italian GT Championship Sprint Cup in the GT3 class.

== Personal life ==
Frassineti is the son of Albano Frassineti, a former rally driver.

== Career ==
Frassineti began karting at the age of four, competing until 2021. Racing in mini karts until 2018, he most notably won the Italian Easykart title in 2017. From 2019 onwards, Frassineti stepped up to junior karts, in which he drove for both Birel ART and KR Motorsport, only mustering a best result of 38th in the WSK Open Cup.

Stepping up to single-seaters in 2022, Frassineti joined Formula 4 newcomers Cars Racing to compete in the Italian F4 Championship. Racing in all but one rounds, Frassineti scored a best result of eighteenth in race three at Misano and ended his rookie season 45th in points. Remaining in Italian F4 for 2023, Frassineti joined BVM Racing for his sophomore season alongside Alfio Spina. Racing in only three rounds, Frassineti scored a best result of fourteenth in race two at Imola, a weekend in which he withdrew from race four after excessively damaging his car in a start line crash in the previous race.

In 2024, Frassineti joined VSR to race in Lamborghini Super Trofeo Europe as a Lamborghini junior, alongside a campaign in the European Crosscar Championship for Semog. Racing in the Pro-Am class for all but two rounds, Frassineti scored class wins at Spa and Jerez to end the year sixth in the class standings. In the other two rounds, Frassineti competed in the Pro class, in which he took his only overall win of the season at Barcelona alongside Mattia Michelotto. During 2024, Frassineti also made his GT3 debut for the same team at the Mugello round of the Italian GT Championship Sprint Cup.

Remaining with VSR and being promoted as a Lamborghini GT3 junior for 2025, Frassineti remained in GT3 competition as he competed in both the Endurance and Sprint Cups of the Italian GT Championship. In the Endurance Cup, Frassineti won at Monza and Mugello on his way to third in the overall standings. In the Sprint Cup, Frassineti scored wins at Mugello, Imola and Monza as he secured the overall title by four points. During 2025, Frassineti also raced with the same team for the Monza and Spa rounds of the GT World Challenge Europe Endurance Cup.

The following year, Frassineti joined Audi-fielding Tresor Attempto Racing for a quadruple campaign in both the Endurance and Sprint Cups of GT World Challenge Europe and the Italian GT Championship. In GTWC's Endurance Cup, Frassineti took a lone Gold class win at the Nürburgring and tenth in points, whereas in the Sprint Cup, he took an overall podium and a Silver class win at Barcelona to end the season seventh in class. In Italian GT meanwhile, Frassineti found more success in the Sprint Cup, taking overall podiums at Imola and Mugello to end the season eighth overall.

== Karting record ==
=== Karting career summary ===
Season	Series	Team	Position
2015	Trofeo Italiano Easykart - Easykart 60	Ten Job	40th
2015	Easykart International Grand Final - Easykart 60	Ten Job	36th
2016	Trofeo Italiano Easykart - 60 Mini KGP		2nd
2017	WSK Champions Cup - 60 Mini	Frassineti Albano	NC
2017	WSK Super Master Series - 60 Mini	Frassineti Albano	94th
2017	WSK Final Cup - 60 Mini	Frassineti Albano	89th
2017	Andrea Margutti Trophy - 60 Mini	MLG Racing	NC
2017	Trofeo Italiano Easykart - 60 Mini		1st
2018	WSK Champions Cup - 60 Mini	Frassineti Albano	NC
2018	WSK Super Master Series - 60 Mini	Birel ART Racing	52nd
2018	WSK Open Cup - 60 Mini	Birel ART Racing	NC
2018	WSK Final Cup - 60 Mini	Birel ART Racing	41st
2018	Italian Karting Championship - 60 Mini		24th
2019	WSK Super Master Series - OK-J	Birel ART Racing	112th
2019	Coupe de France - OK-J	Birel ART Racing; KR Motorsport	NC
2019	Karting European Championship - OK-J	Birel ART Racing; KR Motorsport (Note: Frassineti competed for Birel ART Racing in rounds 1 and for KR Motorsport in rounds 3–4.)	67th
2019	WSK Euro Series - OK-J	KR Motorsport	89th
2019	Karting World Championship - OK-J	KR Motorsport	NC
2019	WSK Open Cup - OK-J	KR Motorsport	38th
2019	WSK Final Cup - OK-J	Pantano Team	NC
2020	WSK Super Master Series - OK-J	Birel Art Racing	67th
2020	South Garda Winter Cup - OK-J	Birel Art Racing	NC
2020	WSK Euro Series - OK-J	Birel Art Racing	69th
2020	Champions of the Future - OK-J	Birel Art Racing	NC
2020	Karting European Championship - OK-J	Birel Art Racing	73rd
2021	WSK Open Cup - KZ2	Frassineti Albano	30th

== Racing record ==
=== Racing career summary ===
Season	Series	Team	Races	Wins	Poles	F/Laps	Podiums	Points	Position
2022	Italian F4 Championship	Cars Racing	17	0	0	0	0	0	45th
2023	Italian F4 Championship	BVM Racing	8	0	0	0	0	0	34th
2024	Lamborghini Super Trofeo Europe – Pro	VSR	4	1	0	0	1	23	13th
2024	Lamborghini Super Trofeo Europe – Pro-Am	VSR	7	2	0	2	4	67.5	6th
2024	Lamborghini Super Trofeo World Finals – Pro-Am	VSR	2	0	0	0	0	8	8th
2024	Italian GT Championship Sprint Cup – GT3	VSR	2	0	0	0	0	14	NC
2024	FIA European Crosscar Championship	Semog	1	0	0	0	0	5	50th
2025	Italian GT Championship Endurance Cup – GT3	VSR	4	2	1	0	2	56	**3rd**
2025	Italian GT Championship Sprint Cup – GT3	VSR	8	3	1	2	5	104	**1st**
2025	GT World Challenge Europe Endurance Cup	VSR	2	0	0	0	0	0	NC
2025	GT World Challenge Europe Endurance Cup – Silver	VSR	2	0	0	0	0	2	38th
2026	GT World Challenge Europe Endurance Cup	Tresor Attempto Racing	5	0	0	0	0	6	29th
2026	GT World Challenge Europe Endurance Cup – Gold	Tresor Attempto Racing	5	1	1	2	1	40	10th
2026	GT World Challenge Europe Sprint Cup	Tresor Attempto Racing	9	0	0	0	1	9.5	22nd
2026	GT World Challenge Europe Sprint Cup – Silver	Tresor Attempto Racing	9	1	1	3	3	56.5	7th
2026	Italian GT Championship Endurance Cup – GT3	Tresor Attempto Racing	4	0	0	0	0	13	16th
2026	Italian GT Championship Sprint Cup – GT3	Tresor Attempto Racing	8	0	1	0	2	35	8th

=== Complete Italian F4 Championship results ===
(key) (Races in bold indicate pole position) (Races in italics indicate fastest lap)

Year	Team	1	2	3	4	5	6	7	8	9	10	11	12	13	14	15	16	17	18	19	20	21	22	DC	Points
2022	Cars Racing	IMO; 1; 20	IMO; 2; 23	IMO; 3; 30	MIS; 1 Ret	MIS; 2; 25	MIS; 3; 18	SPA; 1 WD	SPA; 2 WD	SPA; 3 WD	VLL; 1; 33	VLL; 2; 23	VLL; 3; 24	RBR; 1; 20	RBR; 2	RBR; 3; 19	RBR; 4; 31	MNZ; 1; 19	MNZ; 2 Ret	MNZ; 3 C	MUG; 1; 27	MUG; 2; 35†	MUG; 3; 33	45th	0
2023	BVM Racing	IMO; 1	IMO; 2; 14	IMO; 3 Ret	IMO; 4 DNS	MIS; 1; 21	MIS; 2; 19	MIS; 3; 27	SPA; 1	SPA; 2	SPA; 3	MNZ; 1; 17	MNZ; 2; 28†	MNZ; 3; 19	LEC; 1	LEC; 2	LEC; 3	MUG; 1	MUG; 2	MUG; 3	VLL; 1	VLL; 2	VLL; 3	34th	0

=== Complete GT World Challenge Europe results ===
==== GT World Challenge Europe Endurance Cup ====
(key) (Races in bold indicate pole position) (Races in italics indicate fastest lap)

Year	Team	Car	Class	1	2	3	4	5	6	7	Pos.	Points
2025	VSR	Lamborghini Huracán GT3 Evo 2	Silver	LEC	MNZ; 35	SPA; 6H; 70†	SPA; 12H; 70†	SPA; 24H; Ret	NÜR	BAR	38th	2
2026	Tresor Attempto Racing	Audi R8 LMS Evo II	Gold	LEC; Ret	**MNZ**; Ret	SPA; 6H; 65†	SPA; 12H; 65†	SPA; 24H; Ret	NÜR; 7	ALG; 30	10th	40

==== GT World Challenge Europe Sprint Cup ====
(key) (Races in bold indicate pole position) (Races in italics indicate fastest lap)

Year	Team	Car	Class	1	2	3	4	5	6	7	8	9	10	Pos.	Points
2026	Tresor Attempto Racing	Audi R8 LMS Evo II	Silver	BRH; 1; 22	BRH; 2; 31	**MIS**; **1** Ret	MIS; 2 WD	MAG; 1; 16	MAG; 2; 21	ZAN; 1; 15	ZAN; 2; 22	CAT; 1 Ret	CAT; 2; 3	7th	56.5
