= 2025 Italian GT Championship Endurance Cup =

The 2025 Italian GT Championship Endurance Cup was the thirty-fourth season of the Italian GT Championship. The season began on 2 May at Misano World Circuit Marco Simoncelli and finished on 14 September at Autodromo Internazionale del Mugello. The races are contested with GT3-spec cars, and GT Cup-spec cars in two different divisions, Division 1 for Ferrari Challenge (296) and Lamborghini Super Trofeo cars and Division 2 for Ferrari Challenge (488) and Porsche Carrera Cup cars.

== Calendar ==
Round	Circuit	Date	Map
1	Misano World Circuit Marco Simoncelli, Misano Adriatico, Emilia-Romagna	2–4 May	2025 Italian GT Championship Endurance Cup is located in Italy
2	Autodromo Nazionale Monza, Monza, Lombardy	20–22 June	2025 Italian GT Championship Endurance Cup is located in Italy
3	Autodromo Internazionale Enzo e Dino Ferrari, Imola, Emilia-Romagna	1–3 August	2025 Italian GT Championship Endurance Cup is located in Italy
4	Autodromo Internazionale del Mugello, Mugello, Tuscany	12–14 September	2025 Italian GT Championship Endurance Cup is located in Italy

== Entry list ==
Team	Car	Engine	No.	Drivers	Class	Rounds
GT3
(Italy) BMW Italia Ceccato Racing	BMW M4 GT3 Evo	BMW S58B30T0 3.0 L Twin Turbo I6	1	(Italy) Leonardo Caglioni	PA	All
(Italy) BMW Italia Ceccato Racing	BMW M4 GT3 Evo	BMW S58B30T0 3.0 L Twin Turbo I6	1	(Italy) Stefano Comandini	PA	All
(Italy) BMW Italia Ceccato Racing	BMW M4 GT3 Evo	BMW S58B30T0 3.0 L Twin Turbo I6	1	(Italy) Francesco Guerra	PA	All
(Italy) BMW Italia Ceccato Racing	BMW M4 GT3 Evo	BMW S58B30T0 3.0 L Twin Turbo I6	2	(New Zealand) Brendon Leitch	Am	3
(Italy) BMW Italia Ceccato Racing	BMW M4 GT3 Evo	BMW S58B30T0 3.0 L Twin Turbo I6	2	(United States) Anthony McIntosh	Am	3
(Italy) Pellin Racing	Ferrari 488 GT3 Evo 2020	Ferrari F154 3.9 L Turbo V8	3	(United States) Thor Haugen	Am	All
(Italy) Pellin Racing	Ferrari 488 GT3 Evo 2020	Ferrari F154 3.9 L Turbo V8	3	(Italy) Paolo Ruberti	Am	All
(Italy) Barone Rampante	Lamborghini Huracán GT3 Evo	Lamborghini DGF 5.2 L V10	8	(Italy) Giuseppe Cipriani	PA	1–2
(Italy) Barone Rampante	Lamborghini Huracán GT3 Evo	Lamborghini DGF 5.2 L V10	8	(Italy) Fabrizio Crestani	PA	1–2
(Italy) Barone Rampante	Lamborghini Huracán GT3 Evo	Lamborghini DGF 5.2 L V10	8	(Italy) Leonardo Pulcini	PA	1–2
(Italy) Antonelli Motorsport	Mercedes-AMG GT3 Evo	Mercedes-AMG M159 6.2 L V8	16	(United States) Aaron Farhadi	Am	All
(Italy) Antonelli Motorsport	Mercedes-AMG GT3 Evo	Mercedes-AMG M159 6.2 L V8	16	(Italy) Giuseppe Fascicolo	Am	All
(Italy) Antonelli Motorsport	Mercedes-AMG GT3 Evo	Mercedes-AMG M159 6.2 L V8	16	(Italy) Filippo Bencivenni	Am	1–3
(Italy) Antonelli Motorsport	Mercedes-AMG GT3 Evo	Mercedes-AMG M159 6.2 L V8	16	(France) Lucas Valkre	Am	4
(Italy) Antonelli Motorsport	Mercedes-AMG GT3 Evo	Mercedes-AMG M159 6.2 L V8	64	(Netherlands) Colin Caresani	PA	All
(Italy) Antonelli Motorsport	Mercedes-AMG GT3 Evo	Mercedes-AMG M159 6.2 L V8	64	(Thailand) Tanart Sathienthirakul	PA	All
(Italy) Antonelli Motorsport	Mercedes-AMG GT3 Evo	Mercedes-AMG M159 6.2 L V8	64	(Germany) Florian Scholze	PA	All
(San Marino) Audi Sport Italia	Audi R8 LMS Evo II	Audi DAR 5.2 L V10	21	(United States) Andy Cantù	PA	1–2
(San Marino) Audi Sport Italia	Audi R8 LMS Evo II	Audi DAR 5.2 L V10	21	(Argentina) Nano Lopez	PA	1–2
(San Marino) Audi Sport Italia	Audi R8 LMS Evo II	Audi DAR 5.2 L V10	21	(Italy) Alessandro Bracalente	PA	1
(San Marino) Audi Sport Italia	Audi R8 LMS Evo II	Audi DAR 5.2 L V10	21	(Switzerland) Jody Lambrughi	PA	2
(San Marino) Audi Sport Italia	Audi R8 LMS Evo II	Audi DAR 5.2 L V10	21	(United States) Andy Cantù	P	3–4
(San Marino) Audi Sport Italia	Audi R8 LMS Evo II	Audi DAR 5.2 L V10	21	(Argentina) Nano Lopez	P	3–4
(San Marino) Audi Sport Italia	Audi R8 LMS Evo II	Audi DAR 5.2 L V10	21	(Spain) Daniel Nogales	P	3
(San Marino) Audi Sport Italia	Audi R8 LMS Evo II	Audi DAR 5.2 L V10	21	(Switzerland) Jody Lambrughi	P	4
(Antigua and Barbuda) HAAS RT	Audi R8 LMS Evo II	Audi DAR 5.2 L V10	26	(Canada) Ramez Azzam	PA	All
(Antigua and Barbuda) HAAS RT	Audi R8 LMS Evo II	Audi DAR 5.2 L V10	26	(United Kingdom) Omar Jackson	PA	All
(Antigua and Barbuda) HAAS RT	Audi R8 LMS Evo II	Audi DAR 5.2 L V10	26	(Zimbabwe) Axcil Jefferies	PA	1, 3–4
(Antigua and Barbuda) HAAS RT	Audi R8 LMS Evo II	Audi DAR 5.2 L V10	26	(Belgium) Mathieu Detry	PA	2
(Thailand) Star Performance	Lamborghini Huracán GT3 Evo 2	Lamborghini DGF 5.2 L V10	32	(Thailand) Aniwat Lommahadthai	Am	1
(Thailand) Star Performance	Lamborghini Huracán GT3 Evo 2	Lamborghini DGF 5.2 L V10	32	(Serbia) Miloš Pavlović	Am	1
(Thailand) Star Performance	Lamborghini Huracán GT3 Evo 2	Lamborghini DGF 5.2 L V10	32	(Germany) Florian Spengler	Am	1
(Thailand) Star Performance	Lamborghini Huracán GT3 Evo 2	Lamborghini DGF 5.2 L V10	32	(Colombia) Andrés Méndez	Am	2–4
(Thailand) Star Performance	Lamborghini Huracán GT3 Evo 2	Lamborghini DGF 5.2 L V10	32	(Croatia) Sandro Mur	Am	2–4
(Thailand) Star Performance	Lamborghini Huracán GT3 Evo 2	Lamborghini DGF 5.2 L V10	32	(Finland) Henri Tuomaala	Am	2–4
(Thailand) Star Performance	Lamborghini Huracán GT3 Evo 2	Lamborghini DGF 5.2 L V10	33	(Colombia) Andrés Méndez	Am	1
(Thailand) Star Performance	Lamborghini Huracán GT3 Evo 2	Lamborghini DGF 5.2 L V10	33	(Croatia) Sandro Mur	Am	1
(Thailand) Star Performance	Lamborghini Huracán GT3 Evo 2	Lamborghini DGF 5.2 L V10	33	(Finland) Henri Tuomaala	Am	1
(Thailand) Star Performance	Lamborghini Huracán GT3 Evo 2	Lamborghini DGF 5.2 L V10	33	(Thailand) Aniwat Lommahadthai	Am	2–4
(Thailand) Star Performance	Lamborghini Huracán GT3 Evo 2	Lamborghini DGF 5.2 L V10	33	(Serbia) Miloš Pavlović	Am	2–4
(Thailand) Star Performance	Lamborghini Huracán GT3 Evo 2	Lamborghini DGF 5.2 L V10	33	(Germany) Florian Spengler	Am	2–4
(Italy) AF Corse	Ferrari 296 GT3	Ferrari F163 3.0 L Turbo V6	50	(Italy) Edoardo Borelli	Am	All
(Italy) AF Corse	Ferrari 296 GT3	Ferrari F163 3.0 L Turbo V6	50	(Switzerland) Christoph Ulrich	Am	All
(Italy) AF Corse	Ferrari 296 GT3	Ferrari F163 3.0 L Turbo V6	50	(United Kingdom) Simon Mann	Am	1, 3–4
(Italy) AF Corse	Ferrari 296 GT3	Ferrari F163 3.0 L Turbo V6	50	(Italy) Daniele di Amato	Am	2
(Italy) AF Corse	Ferrari 296 GT3	Ferrari F163 3.0 L Turbo V6	51	(Italy) Lorenzo Ferrari	PA	All
(Italy) AF Corse	Ferrari 296 GT3	Ferrari F163 3.0 L Turbo V6	51	(Italy) Riccardo Ponzio	PA	All
(Italy) AF Corse	Ferrari 296 GT3	Ferrari F163 3.0 L Turbo V6	51	(India) Mahaveer Raghunathan	PA	All
(Italy) AF Corse	Ferrari 296 GT3	Ferrari F163 3.0 L Turbo V6	62	(Egypt) Ibrahim Badawy	PA	All
(Italy) AF Corse	Ferrari 296 GT3	Ferrari F163 3.0 L Turbo V6	62	(Italy) Leonardo Colavita	PA	All
(Italy) AF Corse	Ferrari 296 GT3	Ferrari F163 3.0 L Turbo V6	62	(Spain) David Vidales	PA	All
(Italy) AF Corse	Ferrari 296 GT3	Ferrari F163 3.0 L Turbo V6	83	(Italy) Francesco Castellacci	Am	1–2, 4
(Italy) AF Corse	Ferrari 296 GT3	Ferrari F163 3.0 L Turbo V6	83	(United Kingdom) Jason Ambrose	Am	1–2, 4
(Italy) AF Corse	Ferrari 296 GT3	Ferrari F163 3.0 L Turbo V6	83	(United Kingdom) David McDonald	Am	1–2, 4
(Italy) AF Corse	Ferrari 296 GT3	Ferrari F163 3.0 L Turbo V6	93	(United Kingdom) Oscar Ryndziewcz	Am	4
(Italy) AF Corse	Ferrari 296 GT3	Ferrari F163 3.0 L Turbo V6	93	(Italy) Giacomo Altoè	Am	4
(Italy) Imperiale Racing	Lamborghini Huracán GT3 Evo 2	Lamborghini DGF 5.2 L V10	54	(San Marino) Emanuel Colombini	Am	1–2, 4
(Italy) Imperiale Racing	Lamborghini Huracán GT3 Evo 2	Lamborghini DGF 5.2 L V10	54	(Italy) Alessandro Tarabini	Am	1–2, 4
(Italy) Imperiale Racing	Lamborghini Huracán GT3 Evo 2	Lamborghini DGF 5.2 L V10	54	(San Marino) Emanuele Zonzini	Am	1–2, 4
(Italy) Imperiale Racing	Lamborghini Huracán GT3 Evo 2	Lamborghini DGF 5.2 L V10	85	(Italy) Andrea Cola	P	1–2, 4
(Italy) Imperiale Racing	Lamborghini Huracán GT3 Evo 2	Lamborghini DGF 5.2 L V10	85	(United States) Philippe Denes	P	1–2, 4
(Italy) Imperiale Racing	Lamborghini Huracán GT3 Evo 2	Lamborghini DGF 5.2 L V10	85	(Italy) Jacopo Guidetti	P	1–2, 4
(Italy) Nova Race Events	Honda NSX GT3 Evo25	Honda JNC1 3.5 L Twin Turbo V6	55	(Italy) Francesco de Luca	PA	All
(Italy) Nova Race Events	Honda NSX GT3 Evo25	Honda JNC1 3.5 L Twin Turbo V6	55	(Italy) Rodolfo Massaro	PA	All
(Italy) Nova Race Events	Honda NSX GT3 Evo25	Honda JNC1 3.5 L Twin Turbo V6	55	(Italy) Giovanni Berton	PA	1–2
(Italy) Nova Race Events	Honda NSX GT3 Evo25	Honda JNC1 3.5 L Twin Turbo V6	55	(Italy) Felice Jelmini	PA	3
(Italy) Nova Race Events	Honda NSX GT3 Evo25	Honda JNC1 3.5 L Twin Turbo V6	55	(Italy) Filippo Berto	PA	4
(Italy) Nova Race Events	Honda NSX GT3 Evo25	Honda JNC1 3.5 L Twin Turbo V6	77	(Italy) Luca Magnoni	Am	All
(Italy) Nova Race Events	Honda NSX GT3 Evo25	Honda JNC1 3.5 L Twin Turbo V6	77	(Italy) Paolo Rocca	Am	All
(Italy) Nova Race Events	Honda NSX GT3 Evo25	Honda JNC1 3.5 L Twin Turbo V6	77	(Italy) Andrea Bodellini	Am	1–2
(Italy) Iron Lynx x Trivellato	Mercedes-AMG GT3 Evo	Mercedes-AMG M159 6.2 L V8	61	(Switzerland) Jean-Luc D'Auria	PA	3
(Italy) Iron Lynx x Trivellato	Mercedes-AMG GT3 Evo	Mercedes-AMG M159 6.2 L V8	61	(Netherlands) Lin Hodenius	PA	3
(Italy) VSR	Lamborghini Huracán GT3 Evo 2	Lamborghini DGF 5.2 L V10	63	(Italy) Michele Beretta	P	All
(Italy) VSR	Lamborghini Huracán GT3 Evo 2	Lamborghini DGF 5.2 L V10	63	(Portugal) Rodrigo Testa	P	All
(Italy) VSR	Lamborghini Huracán GT3 Evo 2	Lamborghini DGF 5.2 L V10	63	(Italy) Andrea Frassineti	P	1–2, 4
(Italy) VSR	Lamborghini Huracán GT3 Evo 2	Lamborghini DGF 5.2 L V10	63	(Italy) Alessio Deledda	P	3
(Italy) VSR	Lamborghini Huracán GT3 Evo 2	Lamborghini DGF 5.2 L V10	66	(Italy) Kevin Gilardoni	PA	All
(Italy) VSR	Lamborghini Huracán GT3 Evo 2	Lamborghini DGF 5.2 L V10	66	(Italy) Mattia Michelotto	PA	All
(Italy) VSR	Lamborghini Huracán GT3 Evo 2	Lamborghini DGF 5.2 L V10	66	(Italy) Ignazio Zanon	PA	All
(Italy) Rossocorsa Racing	Ferrari 296 GT3	Ferrari F163 3.0 L Turbo V6	74	(Italy) Samuele Buttarelli	Am	All
(Italy) Rossocorsa Racing	Ferrari 296 GT3	Ferrari F163 3.0 L Turbo V6	74	(Italy) Stefano Marazzi	Am	All
(Germany) Tresor Attempto Racing	Audi R8 LMS Evo II	Audi DAR 5.2 L V10	88	(Italy) Marco Cassarà	PA	All
(Germany) Tresor Attempto Racing	Audi R8 LMS Evo II	Audi DAR 5.2 L V10	88	(Italy) Alberto Di Folco	PA	All
(Germany) Tresor Attempto Racing	Audi R8 LMS Evo II	Audi DAR 5.2 L V10	88	(Italy) Alberto Clementi Pisani	PA	All
(Germany) Tresor Attempto Racing	Audi R8 LMS Evo II	Audi DAR 5.2 L V10	99	(Italy) Riccardo Cazzaniga	P	All
(Germany) Tresor Attempto Racing	Audi R8 LMS Evo II	Audi DAR 5.2 L V10	99	(Italy) Rocco Mazzola	P	All
(Germany) Tresor Attempto Racing	Audi R8 LMS Evo II	Audi DAR 5.2 L V10	99	(Germany) Fabio Rauer	P	All
(Italy) Easy Race	Ferrari 296 GT3	Ferrari F163 3.0 L Turbo V6	98	(Italy) Luigi Coluccio	PA	All
(Italy) Easy Race	Ferrari 296 GT3	Ferrari F163 3.0 L Turbo V6	98	(Italy) Leonardo Gorini	PA	All
(Italy) Easy Race	Ferrari 296 GT3	Ferrari F163 3.0 L Turbo V6	98	(Italy) Carlo Tamburini	PA	All
GT Cup (Division 1)
(Italy) AF Corse	Ferrari 296 Challenge	Ferrari F163 3.0 L Turbo V6	107	(Denmark) Andreas Bogh-Sorensen	PA	All
(Italy) AF Corse	Ferrari 296 Challenge	Ferrari F163 3.0 L Turbo V6	107	(Denmark) Mikkel Mac	PA	All
(Italy) AF Corse	Ferrari 296 Challenge	Ferrari F163 3.0 L Turbo V6	151	(Italy) Edoardo Barbolini	PA	All
(Italy) AF Corse	Ferrari 296 Challenge	Ferrari F163 3.0 L Turbo V6	151	(Italy) Leonardo Megna	PA	All
(Italy) AF Corse	Ferrari 296 Challenge	Ferrari F163 3.0 L Turbo V6	151	(Italy) Vincenzo Scarpetta	PA	All
(Italy) AF Corse	Ferrari 296 Challenge	Ferrari F163 3.0 L Turbo V6	169	(Italy) Fabrizio Fontana	PA	All
(Italy) AF Corse	Ferrari 296 Challenge	Ferrari F163 3.0 L Turbo V6	169	(Italy) Stefano Gai	PA	All
(Italy) AF Corse	Ferrari 296 Challenge	Ferrari F163 3.0 L Turbo V6	282	(Italy) Michele Rugolo	Am	4
(Italy) AF Corse	Ferrari 296 Challenge	Ferrari F163 3.0 L Turbo V6	282	(Netherlands) Willem van der Worm	Am	4
(Italy) Best Lap	Ferrari 296 Challenge	Ferrari F163 3.0 L Turbo V6	111	(Italy) Pietro Pio Agoglia	PA	All
(Italy) Best Lap	Ferrari 296 Challenge	Ferrari F163 3.0 L Turbo V6	111	(Italy) Filippo Croccolino	PA	All
(Italy) Best Lap	Ferrari 296 Challenge	Ferrari F163 3.0 L Turbo V6	111	(Italy) Sabatino di Mare	PA	All
(Italy) Best Lap	Ferrari 296 Challenge	Ferrari F163 3.0 L Turbo V6	219	(Italy) Andrea Levy	Am	All
(Italy) Best Lap	Ferrari 296 Challenge	Ferrari F163 3.0 L Turbo V6	219	(Switzerland) Ivan David Mari	Am	All
(Italy) Best Lap	Ferrari 296 Challenge	Ferrari F163 3.0 L Turbo V6	219	(Italy) Mattia Bucci	Am	1–3
(Italy) Invictus Corse	Lamborghini Huracán Super Trofeo Evo 2	Lamborghini 5.2 L V10	127	(Italy) Lorenzo Cossu	PA	All
(Italy) Invictus Corse	Lamborghini Huracán Super Trofeo Evo 2	Lamborghini 5.2 L V10	127	(Italy) Giuseppe Forenzi	PA	1–3
(Italy) Invictus Corse	Lamborghini Huracán Super Trofeo Evo 2	Lamborghini 5.2 L V10	127	(Belgium) Amaury Bonduel	PA	1
(Italy) Invictus Corse	Lamborghini Huracán Super Trofeo Evo 2	Lamborghini 5.2 L V10	127	(Italy) Filippo Lazzaroni	PA	2
(Italy) Invictus Corse	Lamborghini Huracán Super Trofeo Evo 2	Lamborghini 5.2 L V10	127	(Italy) Francesco Coassin	PA	3–4
(Italy) Rossocorsa	Ferrari 296 Challenge	Ferrari F163 3.0 L Turbo V6	187	(Italy) Matteo Cairoli	PA	3
(Italy) Rossocorsa	Ferrari 296 Challenge	Ferrari F163 3.0 L Turbo V6	187	(Italy) N.M.	PA	3
(Italy) Rossocorsa	Ferrari 296 Challenge	Ferrari F163 3.0 L Turbo V6	280	(Venezuela) Angelo Fontana	Am	4
(Italy) Rossocorsa	Ferrari 296 Challenge	Ferrari F163 3.0 L Turbo V6	280	(United States) Christian Potolicchio	Am	4
(Italy) DL Racing	Lamborghini Huracán Super Trofeo Evo 2	Lamborghini 5.2 L V10	272	(United Kingdom) Dougie Bolger	Am	All
(Italy) DL Racing	Lamborghini Huracán Super Trofeo Evo 2	Lamborghini 5.2 L V10	272	(Italy) Giacomo Riva	Am	All
(Italy) DL Racing	Lamborghini Huracán Super Trofeo Evo 2	Lamborghini 5.2 L V10	272	(Italy) Alessio Salvaggio	Am	All
(Italy) DL Racing	Lamborghini Huracán Super Trofeo Evo 2	Lamborghini 5.2 L V10	273	(Italy) Diego Locanto	Am	All
(Italy) DL Racing	Lamborghini Huracán Super Trofeo Evo 2	Lamborghini 5.2 L V10	273	(Italy) Luca Segù	Am	All
GT Cup Division 2
(Italy) Easy Race	Ferrari 488 Challenge Evo	Ferrari F154CB 3.9 L Turbo V8	403	(Italy) Lorenzo Bontempelli	PA	All
(Italy) Easy Race	Ferrari 488 Challenge Evo	Ferrari F154CB 3.9 L Turbo V8	403	(Italy) Diego di Fabio	PA	All
(Italy) Easy Race	Ferrari 488 Challenge Evo	Ferrari F154CB 3.9 L Turbo V8	403	(Italy) Vito Postiglione	PA	All
(Italy) SP Racing Team	Porsche 992 GT3 Cup	Porsche 4.0 L Flat-6	411	(Italy) Vicky Piria	PA	All
(Italy) SP Racing Team	Porsche 992 GT3 Cup	Porsche 4.0 L Flat-6	411	(Argentina) Matías Russo	PA	All
(Italy) SP Racing Team	Porsche 992 GT3 Cup	Porsche 4.0 L Flat-6	599	(Italy) Matteo Bergonzini	Am	All
(Italy) SP Racing Team	Porsche 992 GT3 Cup	Porsche 4.0 L Flat-6	599	(Italy) Fabio Fabiani	Am	All
(Italy) SP Racing Team	Porsche 992 GT3 Cup	Porsche 4.0 L Flat-6	599	(Greece) Dimitris Deverikos	Am	All
(Italy) Racevent	Porsche 992 GT3 Cup	Porsche 4.0 L Flat-6	422	(Italy) Paolo Calcagno	PA	All
(Italy) Racevent	Porsche 992 GT3 Cup	Porsche 4.0 L Flat-6	422	(Italy) Daniele Corradi	PA	1–3
(Italy) Racevent	Porsche 992 GT3 Cup	Porsche 4.0 L Flat-6	422	(Italy) Ronnie Valori	PA	1–3
(Italy) Racevent	Porsche 992 GT3 Cup	Porsche 4.0 L Flat-6	422	(Italy) Lodovico Laurini	PA	4
(Italy) Racevent	Porsche 992 GT3 Cup	Porsche 4.0 L Flat-6	422	(Italy) Diego Stifter	PA	4
(Italy) Raptor Engineering	Porsche 992 GT3 Cup	Porsche 4.0 L Flat-6	469	(Italy) Massimo Navatta	PA	All
(Italy) Raptor Engineering	Porsche 992 GT3 Cup	Porsche 4.0 L Flat-6	469	(Italy) Flavio Olivieri	PA	All
(Italy) Raptor Engineering	Porsche 992 GT3 Cup	Porsche 4.0 L Flat-6	469	(Italy) Andrea Palma	PA	All
(Italy) Raptor Engineering	Porsche 992 GT3 Cup	Porsche 4.0 L Flat-6	569	(Italy) Gianluca Carboni	Am	All
(Italy) Raptor Engineering	Porsche 992 GT3 Cup	Porsche 4.0 L Flat-6	569	(Italy) Davide di Benedetto	Am	All
(Italy) Raptor Engineering	Porsche 992 GT3 Cup	Porsche 4.0 L Flat-6	569	(Italy) Giuseppe Nicolosi	Am	All
(Italy) Faems Team	Porsche 992 GT3 Cup	Porsche 4.0 L Flat-6	510	(Italy) Federica Levy	Am	All
(Italy) Faems Team	Porsche 992 GT3 Cup	Porsche 4.0 L Flat-6	510	(Italy) Emma Segattini	Am	All
(Italy) Faems Team	Porsche 992 GT3 Cup	Porsche 4.0 L Flat-6	510	(Italy) Jenni Sonzogni	Am	All
(Italy) ZRS Motorsport	Porsche 992 GT3 Cup	Porsche 4.0 L Flat-6	545	(Italy) Steven Giacon	Am	All
(Italy) ZRS Motorsport	Porsche 992 GT3 Cup	Porsche 4.0 L Flat-6	545	(Italy) Luciano Micale	Am	All
(Italy) ZRS Motorsport	Porsche 992 GT3 Cup	Porsche 4.0 L Flat-6	545	(Italy) Paolo Prestipino	Am	All
(Italy) Reparto Corse RAM	Ferrari 488 Challenge Evo	Ferrari F154CB 3.9 L Turbo V8	552	(Italy) Giacomo Parisotto	Am	1–3
(Italy) Reparto Corse RAM	Ferrari 488 Challenge Evo	Ferrari F154CB 3.9 L Turbo V8	552	(Italy) Mattia Simonini	Am	1–3
(Italy) Reparto Corse RAM	Ferrari 488 Challenge Evo	Ferrari F154CB 3.9 L Turbo V8	552	(Germany) Felix Hirsiger	Am	1
(Italy) Reparto Corse RAM	Ferrari 488 Challenge Evo	Ferrari F154CB 3.9 L Turbo V8	552	(Italy) Fabio Daminato	Am	2–3
(San Marino) AKM Motorsport	Mercedes-AMG GT2	Mercedes-AMG 4.0 L V8	564	(Italy) Gian Luca Giraudi	Am	3
(San Marino) AKM Motorsport	Mercedes-AMG GT2	Mercedes-AMG 4.0 L V8	564	(Italy) Giovanni Luigi Giraudi	Am	3
(San Marino) AKM Motorsport	Mercedes-AMG GT2	Mercedes-AMG 4.0 L V8	564	(Italy) Michele Carlo Alberto Giraudi	Am	3
(Italy) Double TT Racing	Ferrari 488 Challenge Evo	Ferrari F154CB 3.9 L Turbo V8	577	(Italy) Matteo Marulla	Am	All
(Italy) Double TT Racing	Ferrari 488 Challenge Evo	Ferrari F154CB 3.9 L Turbo V8	577	(Italy) Nicholas Risitano	Am	All
(Italy) Double TT Racing	Ferrari 488 Challenge Evo	Ferrari F154CB 3.9 L Turbo V8	577	(Italy) Gianmarco Ercoli	Am	1
(Italy) Double TT Racing	Ferrari 488 Challenge Evo	Ferrari F154CB 3.9 L Turbo V8	577	(Poland) Dawid Zydlewski	Am	2–4
Entry Lists:

Icon	Class
GT3 entries
P	Pro Cup
PA	Pro-Am Cup
Am	Am Cup
GT Cup entries
PA	Division 1 Pro-Am
PA	Division 2 Pro-Am
Am	Division 1 Am
Am	Division 2 Am

== Results ==
Bold indicates the overall winners.

=== GT3 ===
Round	Circuit	Date	Pole position	Pro winners	Pro-Am winners	Am winners
1	(Italy) Misano World Circuit Marco Simoncelli	2–4 May	(Germany) No. 99 Tresor Attempto Racing	**(Germany) No. 99 Tresor Attempto Racing**	(Antigua and Barbuda) No. 26 HAAS RT	(Italy) No. 83 AF Corse
1	(Italy) Misano World Circuit Marco Simoncelli	2–4 May	(Italy) Riccardo Cazzaniga (Italy) Rocco Mazzola (Germany) Fabio Rauer	**(Italy) Riccardo Cazzaniga** **(Italy) Rocco Mazzola** **(Germany) Fabio Rauer**	(Canada) Ramez Azzam (United Kingdom) Omar Jackson (Zimbabwe) Axcil Jefferies	(Italy) Francesco Castellacci (United Kingdom) Jason Ambrose (United Kingdom) David McDonald
2	(Italy) Autodromo Nazionale di Monza	20–22 June	(Italy) No. 63 VSR	**(Italy) No. 63 VSR**	(Italy) No. 62 AF Corse	(Thailand) No. 33 Star Performance
2	(Italy) Autodromo Nazionale di Monza	20–22 June	(Italy) Michele Beretta (Italy) Andrea Frassineti (Portugal) Rodrigo Testa	**(Italy) Michele Beretta** **(Italy) Andrea Frassineti** **(Portugal) Rodrigo Testa**	(Egypt) Ibrahim Badawy (Italy) Leonardo Colavita (Spain) David Vidales	(Thailand) Aniwat Lommahadthai (Serbia) Miloš Pavlović (Germany) Florian Spengler
3	(Italy) Autodromo Internazionale Enzo e Dino Ferrari	1–3 August	(Italy) No. 61 Iron Lynx	**(Italy) No. 61 Iron Lynx**	(Italy) No. 64 Antonelli Motorsport	(Italy) No. 2 BMW Italia Ceccato Racing
3	(Italy) Autodromo Internazionale Enzo e Dino Ferrari	1–3 August	(Switzerland) Jean-Luc D'Auria (Netherlands) Lin Hodenius	**(Switzerland) Jean-Luc D'Auria** **(Netherlands) Lin Hodenius**	(Netherlands) Colin Caresani (Thailand) Tanart Sathienthirakul (Germany) Florian Scholze	(New Zealand) Brendon Leitch (Italy) Anthony McIntosh
4	(Italy) Autodromo Internazionale del Mugello	12–14 September	(Italy) No. 63 VSR	**(Italy) No. 63 VSR**	(Italy) No. 66 VSR	(Italy) No. 50 AF Corse
4	(Italy) Autodromo Internazionale del Mugello	12–14 September	(Italy) Michele Beretta (Italy) Andrea Frassineti (Portugal) Rodrigo Testa	**(Italy) Michele Beretta** **(Italy) Andrea Frassineti** **(Portugal) Rodrigo Testa**	(Italy) Kevin Gilardoni (Italy) Mattia Michelotto (Italy) Ignazio Zanon	(Italy) Edoardo Borelli (United Kingdom) Simon Mann (Switzerland) Christoph Ulrich

=== GT Cup ===
Round	Circuit	Date	Pole position	Div. 1 Pro-Am Winners	Div. 1 Am Winners	Div. 2 Pro-Am Winners	Div. 2 Am Winners
1	(Italy) Misano World Circuit Marco Simoncelli	2–4 May		**(Italy) No. 169 AF Corse**	(Italy) No. 273 DL Racing	(Italy) No. 411 SP Racing Team	(Italy) No. 545 ZRS Motorsport
1	(Italy) Misano World Circuit Marco Simoncelli	2–4 May		**(Italy) Fabrizio Fontana** **(Italy) Stefano Gai**	(Italy) Diego Locanto (Italy) Luca Segù	(Italy) Vicky Piria (Argentina) Matías Russo	(Italy) Steven Giacon (Italy) Luciano Micale (Italy) Paolo Prestipino
2	(Italy) Autodromo Nazionale di Monza	20–22 June	(Italy) No. 111 Best Lap	**(Italy) No. 111 Best Lap**	(Italy) No. 273 DL Racing	(Italy) No. 403 Easy Race	(Italy) No. 522 Reparto Corse RAM
2	(Italy) Autodromo Nazionale di Monza	20–22 June	(Italy) Pietro Pio Agoglia (Italy) Filippo Croccolino (Italy) Sabatino di Mare	**(Italy) Pietro Pio Agoglia** **(Italy) Filippo Croccolino** **(Italy) Sabatino di Mare**	(Italy) Diego Locanto (Italy) Luca Segù	(Italy) Lorenzo Bontempelli (Italy) Diego di Fabio (Italy) Vito Postiglione	(Italy) Giacomo Parisotto (Italy) Mattia Simonini (Italy) Fabio Daminato
3	(Italy) Autodromo Internazionale Enzo e Dino Ferrari	1–3 August					
4	(Italy) Autodromo Internazionale del Mugello	12–14 September					

== Standings ==
=== Drivers' championships ===
==== Scoring system ====
Duration	1st	2nd	3rd	4th	5th	6th	7th	8th	9th	10th
100 Minutes	12	10	8	7	6	5	4	3	2	1
3 Hours	20	15	12	10	7	5	4	3	2	1

==== GT3 ====
===== Overall =====
Pos.	Driver	Team	MIS	MNZ	IMO	MUG	Points
1	(Italy) Riccardo Cazzaniga (Italy) Rocco Mazzola (Germany) Fabio Rauer	(Germany) Tresor Attempto Racing	1^{1}	7^{9}	3^{4}	5^{6}	67
2	(Egypt) Ibrahim Badawy (Italy) Leonardo Colavita (Spain) David Vidales	(Italy) AF Corse	5^{2}	2^{5}	12	3^{4}	57
3	(Italy) Michele Beretta (Italy) Andrea Frassineti (Portugal) Rodrigo Testa	(Italy) VSR	Ret	1^{7}	11	1^{1}	56
4	(Italy) Lorenzo Ferrari (Italy) Riccardo Ponzio (India) Mahaveer Raghunathan	(Italy) AF Corse	6^{7}	3^{4}	8^{7}	4^{3}	50
5	(Italy) Luigi Coluccio (Italy) Leonardo Gorini (Italy) Carlo Tamburini	(Italy) Easy Race	4^{4}	6^{3}	6	11	35
6	(Canada) Ramez Azzam (United Kingdom) Omar Jackson	(Antigua and Barbuda) HAAS RT	3^{5}	12	7^{2}	14	32
7	(Zimbabwe) Axcil Jefferies	(Antigua and Barbuda) HAAS RT	3^{5}		7^{2}	14	32
8	(Italy) Leonardo Caglioni (Italy) Stefano Comandini (Italy) Francesco Guerra	(Italy) BMW Italia Ceccato Racing	Ret	4^{1}	Ret	6^{7}	31
9	(Italy) Andrea Cola (United States) Philippe Denes (Italy) Jacopo Guidetti	(Italy) Imperiale Racing	2^{3}	9		10	26
10	(Italy) Kevin Gilardoni (Italy) Mattia Michelotto (Italy) Ignazio Zanon	(Italy) VSR	Ret	14	Ret	2^{2}	25
11	(Thailand) Aniwat Lommahadthai (Serbia) Miloš Pavlović (Germany) Florian Spengler	(Thailand) Star Performance	Ret	5^{6}	5^{5}	13	25
12	(Netherlands) Colin Caresani (Thailand) Tanart Sathienthirakul (Germany) Florian Scholze	(Italy) Antonelli Motorsport	15	8^{8}	4^{10}	8	20
13	(Italy) Francesco Castellacci (United Kingdom) Jason Ambrose (United Kingdom) David McDonald	(Italy) AF Corse	7	11		7^{5}	14
14	(Italy) Francesco de Luca (Italy) Rodolfo Massaro	(Italy) Nova Race Events	8^{8}	Ret	13^{9}	9^{9}	12
15	(United States) Andy Cantù (Argentina) Nano Lopez	(San Marino) Audi Sport Italia	Ret	19^{2}	Ret	DNS	10
16	(Italy) Luca Magnoni (Italy) Paolo Rocca	(Italy) Nova Race Events	Ret	15	9^{8}	12^{10}	6
17	(United States) Aaron Farhadi (Italy) Giuseppe Fascicolo	(Italy) Antonelli Motorsport	Ret	13	14^{6}	Ret	5
18	(Italy) Filippo Bencivenni	(Italy) Antonelli Motorsport	Ret	13	14^{6}		5
19	(Italy) Edoardo Borelli (Switzerland) Christoph Ulrich	(Italy) AF Corse	9^{10}	16	10	Ret	4
20	(United Kingdom) Simon Mann	(Italy) AF Corse	9^{10}		10	Ret	4
21	(Italy) Marco Cassarà (Italy) Alberto Di Folco (Italy) Alberto Clementi Pisani	(Germany) Tresor Attempto Racing	16^{9}	Ret	Ret	Ret	2
22	(San Marino) Emanuel Colombini (Italy) Alessandro Tarabini (San Marino) Emanuele Zonzini	(Italy) Imperiale Racing	10	Ret		19	1
22	(Italy) Samuele Buttarelli (Italy) Stefano Marazzi	(Italy) Rossocorsa Racing	12	10	Ret	15	1
—	(United States) Thor Haugen (Italy) Paolo Ruberti	(Italy) Pellin Racing	11	17	Ret	16	0
—	(Colombia) Andres Mendez (Croatia) Sandro Mur (Finland) Henri Tuomaala	(Thailand) Star Performance	13	Ret	15	18	0
Not classified
—	(Switzerland) Jean-Luc D'Auria (Netherlands) Lin Hodenius	(Italy) Iron Lynx			1^{1}		32
—	(New Zealand) Brendon Leitch (United States) Anthony McIntosh	(Italy) BMW Italia Ceccato Racing			2^{3}		23
—	(Switzerland) Jody Lambrughi	(San Marino) Audi Sport Italia		19^{2}		DNS	10
—	(Italy) Giovanni Berton	(Italy) Nova Race Events	8^{8}	Ret			6
—	(Italy) Giuseppe Cipriani (Italy) Fabrizio Crestani (Italy) Leonardo Pulcini	(Italy) Barone Rampante	14^{6}	20^{10}			6
—	(Italy) Filippo Berto	(Italy) Nova Race Events				9^{9}	4
—	(Italy) Giacomo Altoè (United Kingdom) Oscar Ryndziewcz	(Italy) AF Corse				17^{8}	3
—	(Italy) Felice Jelmini	(Italy) Nova Race Events			13^{9}		2
—	(France) Lucas Valkre	(Italy) Antonelli Motorsport				Ret	0
—	(Italy) Alessandro Bracalente	(San Marino) Audi Sport Italia	Ret				0
—	(Belgium) Mathieu Detry	(Antigua and Barbuda) HAAS RT		12			0
—	(Italy) Daniele di Amato	(Italy) AF Corse		16			0
—	(Spain) Daniel Nogales	(San Marino) Audi Sport Italia			Ret		0
—	(Italy) Andrea Bodellini	(Italy) Nova Race Events	Ret	15			0
Pos.	Driver	Team	MIS	MNZ	IMO	MUG	Points

===== Pro-Am =====
Pos.	Driver	Team	MIS	MNZ	IMO	MUG	Points
1	(Egypt) Ibrahim Badawy (Italy) Leonardo Colavita (Spain) David Vidales	(Italy) AF Corse	3^{1}	1^{5}			50
2	(Italy) Luigi Coluccio (Italy) Leonardo Gorini (Italy) Carlo Tamburini	(Italy) Easy Race	2^{2}	4^{3}			43
3	(Italy) Lorenzo Ferrari (Italy) Riccardo Ponzio (India) Mahaveer Raghunathan	(Italy) AF Corse	4^{5}	2^{4}			38
4	(Canada) Ramez Azzam (United Kingdom) Omar Jackson	(Antigua and Barbuda) HAAS RT	1^{3}	6^{8}			36
5	(Zimbabwe) Axcil Jefferies	(Antigua and Barbuda) HAAS RT	1^{3}				28
6	(Italy) Leonardo Caglioni (Italy) Stefano Comandini (Italy) Francesco Guerra	(Italy) BMW Italia Ceccato Racing	Ret	3^{1}			24
7	(Netherlands) Colin Caresani (Thailand) Tanart Sathienthirakul (Germany) Florian Scholze	(Italy) Antonelli Motorsport	7^{9}	5^{6}			18
7	(Italy) Giuseppe Cipriani (Italy) Fabrizio Crestani (Italy) Leonardo Pulcini	(Italy) Barone Rampante	6^{4}	9^{7}			18
8	(United States) Andy Cantù (Argentina) Nano Lopez	(San Marino) Audi Sport Italia	Ret^{8}	8^{2}			16
9	(Switzerland) Jody Lambrughi	(San Marino) Audi Sport Italia		8^{2}			13
10	(Italy) Giovanni Berton (Italy) Francesco de Luca (Italy) Rodolfo Massaro	(Italy) Nova Race Events	5^{6}	Ret			12
11	(Italy) Marco Cassarà (Italy) Alberto Di Folco (Italy) Alberto Clementi Pisani	(Germany) Tresor Attempto Racing	8^{7}	Ret^{9}			9
12	(Belgium) Mathieu Detry	(Antigua and Barbuda) HAAS RT		6^{8}			8
13	(Italy) Kevin Gilardoni (Italy) Mattia Michelotto (Italy) Ignazio Zanon	(Italy) VSR	Ret	7^{10}			5
14	(Italy) Alessandro Bracalente	(San Marino) Audi Sport Italia	Ret^{8}				3
Pos.	Driver	Team	MIS	MNZ	IMO	MUG	Points

===== Am =====
Pos.	Driver	Team	MIS	MNZ	IMO	MUG	Points
1	(Italy) Francesco Castellacci (United Kingdom) Jason Ambrose (United Kingdom) David McDonald	(Italy) AF Corse	1^{2}	3^{5}			48
2	(Italy) Samuele Buttarelli (Italy) Stefano Marazzi	(Italy) Rossocorsa Racing	5^{5}	2^{2}			38
3	(Italy) Edoardo Borelli (Switzerland) Christoph Ulrich	(Italy) AF Corse	2^{1}	6^{7}			36
4	(Thailand) Aniwat Lommahadthai (Serbia) Miloš Pavlović (Germany) Florian Spengler	(Thailand) Star Performance	Ret	1^{1}			32
5	(United Kingdom) Simon Mann	(Italy) AF Corse	2^{1}				27
6	(United States) Thor Haugen (Italy) Paolo Ruberti	(Italy) Pellin Racing	4^{4}	7^{6}			25
7	(San Marino) Emanuel Colombini (Italy) Alessandro Tarabini (San Marino) Emanuele Zonzini	(Italy) Imperiale Racing	3^{3}	Ret^{8}			23
8	(Italy) Filippo Bencivenni (United States) Aaron Farhadi (Italy) Giuseppe Fascicolo	(Italy) Antonelli Motorsport	Ret	4^{4}			17
9	(Italy) Andrea Bodellini (Italy) Luca Magnoni (Italy) Paolo Rocca	(Italy) Nova Race Events	Ret	5^{3}			15
10	(Colombia) Andres Mendez (Croatia) Sandro Mur (Finland) Henri Tuomaala	(Thailand) Star Performance	6^{6}	Ret^{9}			12
11	(Italy) Daniele di Amato	(Italy) AF Corse		6^{7}			9
Pos.	Driver	Team	MIS	MNZ	IMO	MUG	Points

==== GT Cup - Division 1 ====
===== Pro-Am =====
Pos.	Driver	Team	MIS	MNZ	IMO	MUG	Points
1	(Italy) Fabrizio Fontana (Italy) Stefano Gai	(Italy) AF Corse	1^{1}	2^{2}			57
2	(Italy) Pietro Pio Agoglia (Italy) Filippo Croccolino (Italy) Sabatino di Mare	(Italy) Best Lap	NC	1^{1}			32
3	(Italy) Edoardo Barbolini (Italy) Leonardo Megna (Italy) Vincenzo Scarpetta	(Italy) AF Corse	3^{2}	Ret^{3}			30
4	(Italy) Lorenzo Cossu (Italy) Giuseppe Forenzi	(Italy) Invictus Corse	2^{3}	Ret			23
4	(Belgium) Amaury Bonduel	(Italy) Invictus Corse	2^{3}				23
NC	(Denmark) Andreas Bogh-Sorensen (Denmark) Mikkel Mac	(Italy) AF Corse	Ret	Ret			0
NC	(Italy) Filippo Lazzaroni	(Italy) Invictus Corse		Ret			0
Pos.	Driver	Team	MIS	MNZ	IMO	MUG	Points

===== Am =====
Pos.	Driver	Team	MIS	MNZ	IMO	MUG	Points
1	(Italy) Diego Locanto (Italy) Luca Segù	(Italy) DL Racing	1^{1}	1^{2}			62
2	(Italy) Mattia Bucci (Italy) Andrea Levy (Switzerland) Ivan David Mari	(Italy) Best Lap	2^{2}	2^{1}			52
3	(United Kingdom) Dougie Bolger (Italy) Giacomo Riva (Italy) Alessio Salvaggio	(Italy) DL Racing	WD	3^{3}			20
Pos.	Driver	Team	MIS	MNZ	IMO	MUG	Points

==== GT Cup - Division 2 ====
===== Pro-Am =====
Pos.	Driver	Team	MIS	MNZ	IMO	MUG	Points
1	(Italy) Lorenzo Bontempelli (Italy) Diego di Fabio (Italy) Vito Postiglione	(Italy) Easy Race	4^{4}	1^{1}			49
2	(Italy) Massimo Navatta (Italy) Flavio Olivieri (Italy) Andrea Palma	(Italy) Raptor Engineering	2^{2}	3			45
2	(Italy) Paolo Calcagno (Italy) Daniele Corradi (Italy) Ronnie Valori	(Italy) Racevent	3^{3}	2^{2}			45
3	(Italy) Vicky Piria (Argentina) Matías Russo	(Italy) SP Racing Team	1^{1}	Ret			32
Pos.	Driver	Team	MIS	MNZ	IMO	MUG	Points

===== Am =====
Pos.	Driver	Team	MIS	MNZ	IMO	MUG	Points
1	(Italy) Matteo Marulla (Italy) Nicholas Risitano	(Italy) Double TT Racing	2^{2}	4^{2}			45
2	(Italy) Matteo Bergonzini (Italy) Fabio Fabiani (Greece) Dimitris Deverikos	(Italy) SP Racing Team	3^{3}	3^{3}			40
3	(Italy) Federica Levy (Italy) Emma Segattini (Italy) Jenni Sonzogni	(Italy) Faems Team	4^{5}	2^{4}			38
4	(Italy) Giacomo Parisotto (Italy) Mattia Simonini	(Italy) Reparto Corse RAM	Ret	1^{1}			32
4	(Italy) Fabio Daminato	(Italy) Reparto Corse RAM		1^{1}			32
4	(Italy) Steven Giacon (Italy) Luciano Micale (Italy) Paolo Prestipino	(Italy) ZRS Motorsport	1^{1}	Ret			32
5	(Italy) Gianmarco Ercoli	(Italy) Double TT Racing	2^{2}				25
6	(Poland) Dawid Zydlewski	(Italy) Double TT Racing		4^{2}			20
7	(Italy) Gianluca Carboni (Italy) Davide di Benedetto (Italy) Giuseppe Nicolosi	(Italy) Raptor Engineering	5^{4}	Ret^{5}			20
NC	(Germany) Felix Hirsiger	(Italy) Reparto Corse RAM	Ret				0
Pos.	Driver	Team	MIS	MNZ	IMO	MUG	Points

== See also ==
- 2025 Italian GT Championship
- 2025 Italian GT Championship Sprint Cup
