= 2024 Lamborghini Super Trofeo Europe =

The 2024 Lamborghini Super Trofeo Europe was the sixteenth season of the Lamborghini Super Trofeo Europe. The season began on 19 April at Imola, and finished on 15 November with the World Final at Jerez, featuring 6 rounds.

== Calendar ==
The calendar for the 2024 season was released on 2 November 2023, featuring six rounds. On 18 November, Lamborghini announced that they will hold the World Finals at Jerez.

Rnd.	Circuit	Date	Supporting
1	Imola Circuit, Emilia-Romagna, Italy	19–21 April	FIA World Endurance Championship
2	Circuit de Spa-Francorchamps, Stavelot, Belgium	9–11 May	FIA World Endurance Championship
3	Circuit de la Sarthe, Le Mans, France	11–15 June	FIA World Endurance Championship
4	Nürburgring, Nürburg, Germany	26–28 July	GT World Challenge Europe Endurance Cup
5	Circuit de Barcelona-Catalunya, Montmeló, Spain	11–13 October	GT World Challenge Europe Sprint Cup
6	Circuito de Jerez, Andalusia, Spain	14–15 November	Lamborghini Super Trofeo World Final
WF	Circuito de Jerez, Andalusia, Spain	16–17 November	Lamborghini Super Trofeo World Final

== Entry list ==
All teams use the Lamborghini Huracán Super Trofeo Evo2.

Team	No.	Drivers	Class	Rounds
(Belgium) Boutsen VDS	2	(Belgium) Renaud Kuppens	PA	1–5
(Belgium) Boutsen VDS	2	(United States) Roee Meyuhas	PA	1–5
(Italy) Auto Sport Racing Service	3	(Poland) Adrian Lewandowski	PA	1
(Italy) Auto Sport Racing Service	3	(Poland) Andrzej Lewandowski	PA	1
(Italy) Auto Sport Racing Service	3	(Poland) Adrian Lewandowski	Am	2–5
(Italy) Auto Sport Racing Service	3	(Poland) Andrzej Lewandowski	Am	2, 4–5
(Italy) Auto Sport Racing Service	32	(Italy) Paolo Biglieri	LC	1–5
(Italy) Auto Sport Racing Service	32	(Serbia) Petar Matić	LC	1–5
(Italy) Auto Sport Racing Service	33	(Serbia) Miloš Pavlović	PA	1–5
(Italy) Auto Sport Racing Service	33	(Italy) Alessio Ruffini	PA	1–5
(Italy) Iron Lynx	4	(Belgium) Claude-Yves Gosselin (Note: Gosselin is a French driver competing under a Belgian license.)	PA	1–5
(Italy) Iron Lynx	4	(France) Joran Leneutre	PA	1–5
(Italy) Iron Lynx	41	(Bulgaria) Stefan Bostandjiev	P	1–5
(Italy) Iron Lynx	41	(Bulgaria) Pavel Lefterov	P	1–5
(Italy) Iron Lynx	42	(Italy) Giorgio Amati	P	1–5
(Italy) Iron Lynx	42	(Finland) Jesse Salmenautio	P	1–5
(Italy) Iron Lynx	43	(Bulgaria) Georgi Dimitrov	P	1–4
(Italy) Iron Lynx	43	(France) Edgar Maloigne	P	1–4
(Italy) Iron Lynx	49	(United Kingdom) John Seale	LC	1–5
(Italy) Iron Lynx	49	(United Kingdom) Charlie Martin	LC	4–5
(Italy) VSR	6	(Italy) Mattia Michelotto	P	1–5
(Italy) VSR	6	(Belgium) Gilles Stadsbader	P	1–2
(Italy) VSR	6	(United Kingdom) Micah Stanley	P	4
(Italy) VSR	16	(Italy) Andrea Frassineti	P	1–2
(Italy) VSR	16	(Italy) Ignazio Zanon	P	1–2
(Italy) VSR	16	(Italy) Andrea Frassineti	PA	3–5
(Italy) VSR	16	(Italy) Ignazio Zanon	PA	3–5
(Italy) VSR	66	(Italy) Piergiacomo Randazzo	Am	1–5
(Italy) VSR	66	(France) Stephane Tribaudini	Am	1–5
(Italy) VSR	95	(Belgium) Baptiste Moulin	P	2
(Italy) Rexal Villorba Corse	8	(France) Donovan Privitelio (Note: Donovan Privitelio is a Sammarinese driver competing under a French licence.)	LC	1–5
(Italy) Rexal Villorba Corse	8	(San Marino) Luciano Privitelio	LC	1–5
(Italy) Rexal Villorba Corse	15	(Italy) Benedetto Strignano	P	1–4
(Italy) Rexal Villorba Corse	15	(Italy) Alberto Di Folco	P	1–2, 4
(Italy) Rexal Villorba Corse	26	(France) Cyril Saleilles	Am	1–5
(Italy) Rexal Villorba Corse	26	(France) Julien Lambert	Am	1–2
(Italy) Target Racing	9	(Denmark) Largim Ali	P	1–5
(Italy) Target Racing	9	(Sweden) Oliver Söderström	P	1–5
(Italy) Target Racing	31	(Sweden) Hampus Ericsson	P	1–5
(Italy) Target Racing	39	(China) Han Huilin	Am	1–5
(Italy) Target Racing	81	(Hong Kong) Alex Au	PA	4
(Italy) Target Racing	81	(Denmark) Frederik Schandorff	PA	4
(Italy) Lamborghini Stuttgart by Target Racing	10	(Sweden) Calle Bergman	P	1
(Italy) Lamborghini Stuttgart by Target Racing	10	(Italy) Guido Luchetti	P	1
(Italy) Lamborghini Stuttgart by Target Racing	10	(Sweden) Calle Bergman	PA	2, 4–5
(Italy) Lamborghini Stuttgart by Target Racing	10	(Italy) Guido Luchetti	PA	2, 4–5
(Italy) Lamborghini Stuttgart by Target Racing	10	(United States) Aliabadi Cam	Am	3
(Italy) Lamborghini Stuttgart by Target Racing	10	(Italy) Guido Luchetti	Am	3
(United Arab Emirates) Micanek Motorsport powered by Buggyra	11	(Czech Republic) Bronislav Formánek	PA	1–5
(United Arab Emirates) Micanek Motorsport powered by Buggyra	11	(Czech Republic) Štefan Rosina (Note: Štefan Rosina is a Slovak driver competing under a Czech licence.)	PA	1–5
(United Arab Emirates) Micanek Motorsport powered by Buggyra	22	(Czech Republic) Jáchym Galáš	P	1–5
(United Arab Emirates) Micanek Motorsport powered by Buggyra	22	(Czech Republic) Matěj Pavlíček	P	1–5
(France) Schumacher CLRT	13	(France) Stéphan Guérin	Am	1–5
(France) Schumacher CLRT	76	(France) Lola Lovinfosse	P	1–3
(France) Schumacher CLRT	76	(France) Jean-Baptiste Mela	P	1–3
(France) Schumacher CLRT	76	(France) Laurent Hurgon	PA	4–5
(France) Schumacher CLRT	76	(France) Lola Lovinfosse	PA	4–5
(France) Schumacher CLRT	83	(France) Simon Tirman	P	1–4
(France) Schumacher CLRT	83	(France) Simon Gachet	P	1, 3–5
(France) Schumacher CLRT	83	(France) Grégory Guilvert	P	5
(Italy) Oregon Team	14	(Italy) Pietro Perolini	PA	1, 5
(Italy) Oregon Team	14	(Italy) Davide Roda	PA	1
(Italy) Oregon Team	14	(Italy) Kevin Gilardoni	PA	5
(Italy) Oregon Team	14	(Italy) Pietro Perolini	Am	2–3
(Italy) Oregon Team	14	(Italy) Davide Roda	Am	2–3
(Italy) Oregon Team	14	(Italy) Kevin Gilardoni	P	4
(Italy) Oregon Team	14	(Italy) Pietro Perolini	P	4
(Italy) Oregon Team	34	(France) Paul Levet	P	1–5
(Italy) Oregon Team	34	(Hungary) László Tóth	P	1–5
(Italy) Oregon Team	61	(Italy) Leonardo Caglioni	P	1–5
(Italy) Oregon Team	61	(France) Enzo Géraci	P	1–5
(Belgium) DS Racing	17	(France) Serge Doms	LC	1–4
(Germany) AKF Motorsport	24	(Germany) Oliver Freymuth	Am	1–5
(Poland) UNIQ Racing	25	(Poland) Jerzy Spinkiewicz	P	1–5
(France) CMR	27	(Belgium) Stéphane Lémeret	Am	1–5
(France) CMR	27	(Belgium) Rodrigue Gillion	Am	1–5
(France) CMR	30	(France) Quentin Antonel	P	1–5
(France) CMR	30	(France) Loris Cabirou	P	1–3
(Belgium) BDR Competition by Grupo Prom	28	(France) Amaury Bonduel (Note: Amaury Bonduel is a Belgian driver competing under a French license.)	P	1–5
(Belgium) BDR Competition by Grupo Prom	77	(Mexico) Alfredo Hernández Ortega	LC	1–5
(Belgium) Semspeed	36	(Belgium) Benoît Semoulin	LC	2
(Belgium) Semspeed	36	(Belgium) François Semoulin	LC	2
(Kazakhstan) ART-Line	40	(Belgium) Nigel Bailly	Am	1–5
(Kazakhstan) ART-Line	57	(Kyrgyzstan) Egor Orudzhev (Note: Egor Orudzhev is a Russian driver competing under a Kyrgyz licence as Russian national emblems were banned by the FIA due to the Russian invasion of Ukraine.)	P	1–5
(Kazakhstan) ART-Line	75	(Kazakhstan) Shota Abkhazava	LC	1–5
(Italy) DL Racing	48	(Italy) Cristian Bortolato	PA	1
(Italy) DL Racing	48	(Italy) Andrea Fontana	PA	1
(Italy) DL Racing	50	(Portugal) Rodrigo Testa	P	1–5
(Italy) DL Racing	50	(Italy) Riccardo Ianniello	P	1–4
(Italy) DL Racing	62	(Egypt) Ibrahim Badawy	P	1–5
(Italy) DL Racing	68	(France) Lucas Valkre	P	1–2, 5
(Italy) DL Racing	68	(Italy) Filippo Lazzaroni	P	1–2
(Italy) DL Racing	68	(Italy) Diego di Fabio	P	5
(Italy) DL Racing	68	(Italy) Filippo Lazzaroni	PA	3–4
(Italy) DL Racing	68	(France) Lucas Valkre	PA	3–4
(Italy) DL Racing	72	(Italy) Diego Locanto	Am	1
(Italy) DL Racing	72	(Italy) Stefano Pezzucchi	Am	1
(Italy) DL Racing	72	(Italy) Diego Locanto	PA	4
(Italy) DL Racing	72	(Italy) Luca Segù	PA	4
(Slovakia) Brutal Fish Racing Team	54	(Canada) Jason Keats	LC	1–3
(Slovakia) Brutal Fish Racing Team	54	(United Kingdom) Charlie Martin	LC	1–3
(Slovakia) Brutal Fish Racing Team	71	(Japan) Dougie Bolger	P	1–2
(Slovakia) Brutal Fish Racing Team	71	(Italy) Jacopo Guidetti	P	1–2
(Switzerland) Autovitesse	63	(Switzerland) Cedric Leimer	Am	1, 3, 5
(Switzerland) Autovitesse	63	(France) Julien Piguet	Am	1, 3, 5
(Denmark) GM Motorsport	69	(Denmark) Marco Gersager	P	1
(Denmark) GM Motorsport	69	(Denmark) Marco Gersager	Am	2–5
(Germany) Leipert Motorsport	70	(Germany) Sebastian Balthasar	P	1–5
(Germany) Leipert Motorsport	70	(Germany) Jacob Riegel	P	1–5
(Germany) Leipert Motorsport	88	(Australia) Nathan Herne	P	2
(Germany) Leipert Motorsport	88	(Germany) Tim Stender	P	2
(Germany) Leipert Motorsport	88	(China) Liang Jiatong	PA	3
(Germany) Leipert Motorsport	88	(Cyprus) Stanislav Minsky	PA	3
(Germany) Leipert Motorsport	88	(Germany) Alexander Woller	PA	4
(Germany) Leipert Motorsport	88	(Switzerland) "Takis"	PA	4
(Germany) Leipert Motorsport	89	(China) Luo Haowen	Am	3
(Germany) Leipert Motorsport	89	(China) Song Jiajun	Am	3
(Germany) Leipert Motorsport	99	(United States) Glenn McGee	Am	1, 3
(Germany) Leipert Motorsport	99	(United States) Anthony McIntosh	Am	1, 3
(Germany) Leipert Motorsport	99	(United States) Anthony McIntosh	PA	5
(Germany) Leipert Motorsport	99	(New Zealand) Brendon Leitch	PA	5
(France) Pegasus Racing	74	(France) Anthony Nahra	P	1–2
(France) Pegasus Racing	74	(France) Dimitri Enjalbert	P	1–2
(France) Pegasus Racing	74	(France) Anthony Nahra	PA	3–5
(France) Pegasus Racing	74	(France) Dimitri Enjalbert	PA	3–5
GT3 Poland	90	(Germany) Holger Harmsen	Am	1
GT3 Poland	90	(Germany) Holger Harmsen	LC	2–5
(Italy) Aggressive Team Italia	93	(Italy) Mauro Guastamacchia	Am	1
(Italy) Aggressive Team Italia	93	(Saudi Arabia) Karim Ojjeh	Am	1
(Italy) Aggressive Team Italia	93	(Saudi Arabia) Karim Ojjeh	LC	2–5
(Italy) GG Magic Motorsport	97	(Italy) Giuseppe Guirreri	P	1–4
(Italy) GG Magic Motorsport	97	(Germany) Maximilian Paul	P	4
Entrylists:

Icon	Class
P	Pro Cup
PA	Pro-Am Cup
Am	Am Cup
LC	Lamborghini Cup

== Race results ==
Bold indicates the overall winner.

Drivers credited with winning pole position for their respective teams are indicated in bold text.

Round		Circuit	Pole position	Pro Winners	Pro-Am Winners	Am Winners	LC Winners
1	R1	(Italy) Imola Circuit	(Belgium) No. 28 BDR Competition by Grupo Prom	**(Italy) No. 9 Target Racing**	(Belgium) No. 2 Boutsen VDS	(Kazakhstan) No. 40 ART-Line	(Slovakia) No. 54 Brutal Fish Racing Team
1	R1	(Italy) Imola Circuit	**(France) Amaury Bonduel**	**(Denmark) Largim Ali** **(Sweden) Oliver Söderström**	(Belgium) Renaud Kuppens (United States) Roee Meyuhas	(Belgium) Nigel Bailly	(Canada) Jason Keats (United Kingdom) Charlie Martin
1	R2	(Italy) Imola Circuit	(Belgium) No. 28 BDR Competition by Grupo Prom	**(Belgium) No. 28 BDR Competition by Grupo Prom**	(United Arab Emirates) No. 11 Micanek Motorsport powered by Buggyra	(Italy) No. 3 Auto Sport Racing Service	(Kazakhstan) No. 75 ART-Line
1	R2	(Italy) Imola Circuit	**(France) Amaury Bonduel**	**(France) Amaury Bonduel**	(Czech Republic) Bronislav Formánek (Czech Republic) Štefan Rosina (Note: Štefan Rosina is a Slovak driver competing under a Czech licence.)	(Poland) Adrian Lewandowski (Poland) Andrzej Lewandowski	(Kazakhstan) Shota Abkhazava
2	R1	(Belgium) Circuit de Spa-Francorchamps	(Belgium) No. 28 BDR Competition by Grupo Prom	**(Belgium) No. 28 BDR Competition by Grupo Prom**	(Belgium) No. 2 Boutsen VDS	(Italy) No. 66 VSR	No. 90 GT3 Poland
2	R1	(Belgium) Circuit de Spa-Francorchamps	**(France) Amaury Bonduel**	**(France) Amaury Bonduel**	(Belgium) Renaud Kuppens (United States) Roee Meyuhas	(Italy) Piergiacomo Randazzo (France) Stephane Tribaudini	(Germany) Holger Harmsen
2	R2	(Belgium) Circuit de Spa-Francorchamps	(Belgium) No. 28 BDR Competition by Grupo Prom	(Belgium) No. 28 BDR Competition by Grupo Prom	(Italy) No. 16 VSR	(France) No. 13 Schumacher CLRT	(Italy) No. 32 Auto Sport Racing Service
2	R2	(Belgium) Circuit de Spa-Francorchamps	**(France) Amaury Bonduel**	**(France) Amaury Bonduel**	(Italy) Andrea Frassineti (Italy) Ignazio Zanon	(France) Stéphan Guérin	(Serbia) Petar Matić (Italy) Paolo Biglieri
3	R1	(France) Circuit de la Sarthe	(Belgium) No. 28 BDR Competition by Grupo Prom	(Italy) No. 6 VSR	(France) No. 74 Pegasus Racing	(Denmark) No. 69 GM Motorsport	(Italy) No. 32 Auto Sport Racing Service
3	R1	(France) Circuit de la Sarthe	**(France) Amaury Bonduel**	**(Italy) Mattia Michelotto**	(France) Anthony Nahra (France) Dimitri Enjalbert	(Denmark) Marco Gersager	(Serbia) Petar Matić (Italy) Paolo Biglieri
3	R2	(France) Circuit de la Sarthe	(Belgium) No. 28 BDR Competition by Grupo Prom	Race cancelled			
3	R2	(France) Circuit de la Sarthe	**(France) Amaury Bonduel**	Race cancelled			
4	R1	(Germany) Nürburgring	(Belgium) No. 28 BDR Competition by Grupo Prom	(Belgium) **No. 28 BDR Competition by Grupo Prom**	(United Arab Emirates) No. 11 Micanek Motorsport powered by Buggyra	(Italy) No. 66 VSR	(Kazakhstan) No. 75 ART-Line
4	R1	(Germany) Nürburgring	**(France) Amaury Bonduel**	**(France) Amaury Bonduel**	(Czech Republic) Bronislav Formánek (Czech Republic) Štefan Rosina	(Italy) Piergiacomo Randazzo (France) Stephane Tribaudini	(Kazakhstan) Shota Abkhazava
4	R2	(Germany) Nürburgring	(Italy) No. 81 Target Racing	(Kazakhstan) **No. 57 ART-Line**	(Italy) No. 81 Target Racing	(Italy) No. 66 VSR	(Kazakhstan) No. 75 ART-Line
4	R2	(Germany) Nürburgring	**(Hong Kong)** Alex Au **(Denmark) Frederik Schandorff**	**(Kyrgyzstan) Egor Orudzhev**	**(Hong Kong)** Alex Au **(Denmark)** Frederik Schandorff	(Italy) Piergiacomo Randazzo (France) Stephane Tribaudini	(Kazakhstan) Shota Abkhazava
5	R1	(Spain) Circuit de Barcelona-Catalunya					
5	R2	(Spain) Circuit de Barcelona-Catalunya					
6	R1	(Spain) Circuito de Jerez					
6	R2	(Spain) Circuito de Jerez					
WF	R1	(Spain) Circuito de Jerez					
WF	R2	(Spain) Circuito de Jerez					
