= 2026 Lamborghini Super Trofeo Europe =

Sports car racing series season

The 2026 Lamborghini Super Trofeo Europe was the eighteenth season of the Lamborghini Super Trofeo Europe. The season began on 10 April at Paul Ricard, and finished on 25 October with the World Final at Monza, featuring 6 rounds.

== Calendar ==
The calendar for the 2026 season was released on 8 November 2025, featuring six rounds.

| Rnd. | Circuit | Date | Supporting |
|---|---|---|---|
| 1 | Circuit Paul Ricard, Le Castellet, France | 10–12 April | GT World Challenge Europe Endurance Cup |
| 2 | Imola Circuit, Imola, Italy | 9–10 May | Standalone event |
| 3 | Circuit de Spa-Francorchamps, Stavelot, Belgium | 25–27 June | GT World Challenge Europe Endurance Cup |
| 4 | Nürburgring, Nürburg, Germany | 28–30 August | GT World Challenge Europe Endurance Cup |
| 5 | Circuit de Barcelona-Catalunya, Montmeló, Spain | 2–4 October | GT World Challenge Europe Sprint Cup |
| 6 | Monza Circuit, Monza, Italy | 22–23 October | Lamborghini Super Trofeo World Finals |
| WF | Monza Circuit, Monza, Italy | 24–25 October | Lamborghini Super Trofeo World Finals |

== Teams and drivers ==
All teams used the Lamborghini Huracán Super Trofeo EVO2.

| Team | No. | Drivers | Class | Rounds |
|---|---|---|---|---|
| (Italy) Auto Sport Racing Service | 3 | (Serbia) Petar Matić | LC | All |
| (Italy) Auto Sport Racing Service | 16 | (Poland) Andrzej Lewandowski | Am | 6 |
| (Italy) Auto Sport Racing Service | 32 | (Italy) Paolo Biglieri | PA | All |
| (Italy) Auto Sport Racing Service | 32 | (Italy) Marzio Moretti | PA | All |
| (Italy) Auto Sport Racing Service | 33 | (Serbia) Miloš Pavlović | PA | All |
| (Italy) Auto Sport Racing Service | 33 | (Italy) Alessio Ruffini | PA | All |
| (Italy) Auto Sport Racing Service | 86 | (Indonesia) Umar Abdullah Basalamah | LC | 1–4 |
| (Italy) Rexal Villorba Corse | 4 | (Belgium) Claude-Yves Gosselin | LC | All |
| (Italy) Rexal Villorba Corse | 7 | (Saudi Arabia) Karim Ojjeh | Am | 2–5 |
| (Italy) Rexal Villorba Corse | 8 | (France) Donovan Privitelio | LC | All |
| (Italy) Rexal Villorba Corse | 8 | (San Marino) Luciano Privitelio | LC | All |
| (Italy) Rexal Villorba Corse | 15 | (Italy) Nicholas Pujatti | P | All |
| (Italy) Rexal Villorba Corse | 15 | (Italy) Benedetto Strignano | P | All |
| (Italy) Rexal Villorba Corse | 22 | (Switzerland) Nathanael Berreby | P | All |
| (Italy) Rexal Villorba Corse | 22 | (France) Hugo Giraud | P | All |
| (Italy) Rexal Villorba Corse | 64 | (United Kingdom) Philip Truman | LC | 5–6 |
| (Italy) Rexal Villorba Corse | 64 | (Italy) Michele Merendino | LC | 5–6 |
| GT3 Poland | 5 | (Poland) Grzegorz Moczulski | Am | All |
| GT3 Poland | 16 | (Poland) Adrian Lewandowski | Am | 2 |
| GT3 Poland | 16 | (Poland) Andrzej Lewandowski | Am | 2 |
| GT3 Poland | 90 | (Germany) Holger Harmsen | LC | All |
| (Italy) VSR | 6 | (United Kingdom) Finley Green | P | All |
| (Italy) VSR | 6 | (United Kingdom) Euan Hankey | P | 2–6 |
| (Italy) VSR | 66 | (Portugal) Miguel Cristóvão | PA | All |
| (Italy) VSR | 66 | (France) Paul Levet | PA | All |
| (France) Team CMR | 9 | (Belgium) Frédéric Bouvy | Am | 3 |
| (France) Team CMR | 27 | (Belgium) Rodrigue Gillion | Am | All |
| (France) Team CMR | 27 | (Belgium) Stéphane Lémeret | Am | All |
| (United Arab Emirates) Micanek Motorsport powered by Buggyra | 11 | (Czech Republic) Bronislav Formánek | PA | All |
| (United Arab Emirates) Micanek Motorsport powered by Buggyra | 11 | (South Africa) Anthony Pretorius | PA | All |
| (United Arab Emirates) Micanek Motorsport powered by Buggyra | 46 | (Czech Republic) Jakub Knoll | Am | All |
| (United Arab Emirates) Micanek Motorsport powered by Buggyra | 46 | (Belgium) Renaud Kuppens | Am | All |
| (Kazakhstan) ART-Line | 12 | (Kazakhstan) Shota Abkhazava | PA | 3 |
| (Kazakhstan) ART-Line | 12 | (Kyrgyzstan) Egor Orudzhev | PA | 3 |
| (Italy) Oregon Team | 14 | (Brazil) Adalberto Baptista | LC | All |
| (Italy) Oregon Team | 34 | (Brazil) Rogério Leitzke Grotta | P | All |
| (Italy) Oregon Team | 34 | (Italy) Alfio Andrea Spina | P | All |
| (Italy) Oregon Team | 36 | (Italy) Patrik Fraboni | P | All |
| (Italy) Oregon Team | 36 | (Denmark) Silas Rytter | P | All |
| (Italy) Oregon Team | 61 | (Czech Republic) Josef Knopp | PA | All |
| (Italy) Oregon Team | 61 | (Italy) Pietro Perolini | PA | All |
| (Italy) DL Racing | 23 | (Italy) Francesco Turzo | LC | All |
| (Italy) DL Racing | 38 | (Hong Kong) Philip Tang | LC | All |
| (Italy) DL Racing | 41 | (Italy) Cristian Bortolato | LC | 1–3 |
| (Italy) DL Racing | 41 | (Italy) Francesco Galli | Am | 5 |
| (Italy) DL Racing | 62 | (Italy) Luigi Ferrara | PA | 6 |
| (Italy) DL Racing | 62 | (Italy) Francesco Galli | PA | 6 |
| (Italy) DL Racing | 72 | (Italy) Simone Iaquinta | P | All |
| (Italy) DL Racing | 72 | (Switzerland) Kevin Gilardoni | P | All |
| (Poland) UNIQ Racing | 25 | (Poland) Jerzy Spinkiewicz | P | All |
| (Italy) Invictus Corse | 31 | (Estonia) Sergei Astafjev | PA | All |
| (Italy) Invictus Corse | 31 | (Venezuela) Jonathan Cecotto | PA | All |
| (Germany) Leipert Motorsport | 44 | (Sweden) Axel Bengtsson | P | All |
| (Germany) Leipert Motorsport | 44 | (Sweden) Manz Thalin | P | All |
| (Germany) Leipert Motorsport | 70 | (New Zealand) Brendon Leitch | PA | 3 |
| (Germany) Leipert Motorsport | 70 | (United States) Donald Yount | PA | 3 |
| (Germany) Leipert Motorsport | 70 | (Brazil) Joao Paulo Diaz Balesteiro | P | 4 |
| (Germany) Leipert Motorsport | 70 | (United States) Barrett Wolfe | P | 4 |
| (Germany) Leipert Motorsport | 70 | (New Zealand) Brendon Leitch | P | 6 |
| (Germany) Leipert Motorsport | 70 | (Australia) Nicolas Stati | P | 6 |
| (Germany) Leipert Motorsport | 88 | (Finland) Matias Salonen | P | All |
| (Germany) Leipert Motorsport | 88 | (Finland) Henri Tuomaala | P | All |
| (Germany) Leipert Motorsport | 89 | (Australia) Todd Kingsford | Am | 3 |
| (Germany) Leipert Motorsport | 89 | (Australia) Todd Kingsford | PA | 5 |
| (Germany) Leipert Motorsport | 89 | (New Zealand) Chris van der Drift | PA | 5 |
| (Germany) Leipert Motorsport | 89 | (Brazil) Joao Paulo Diaz Balesteiro | P | 6 |
| (Germany) Leipert Motorsport | 89 | (United States) Barrett Wolfe | P | 6 |
| (Germany) HZO Fortis Racing by Leipert Motorsport | 75 | (New Zealand) Chris van der Drift | PA | 3–4 |
| (Germany) HZO Fortis Racing by Leipert Motorsport | 75 | (Malaysia) Hairie Zairel Oh | PA | 3–4 |
| (Switzerland) Autovitesse | 63 | (Switzerland) Cedric Leimer | Am | 2 |
| (Switzerland) Autovitesse | 63 | (Switzerland) Laurent Jenny | Am | 2 |
| (Denmark) DC Motorsport | 67 | (Denmark) Peder Møller Demant | LC | All |
| (Denmark) DC Motorsport | 67 | (Denmark) Nina Østergaard | LC | All |
| (Denmark) DC Motorsport | 69 | (Denmark) Ulrich Niels Nybøe | Am | 2–3, 5 |
| (Denmark) DC Motorsport | 69 | (Denmark) Ulrik Larsen | Am | 2 |
| (Denmark) DC Motorsport | 69 | (Denmark) Peter Hegelund | Am | 3 |
| (Denmark) DC Motorsport | 69 | (Denmark) Mathias Chrone | PA | 1, 6 |
| (Denmark) DC Motorsport | 69 | (Denmark) Peter Hegelund | PA | 1, 6 |
| (Italy) Automobile Tricolore | 96 | (Italy) Raffaele Giannoni | Am | 2, 6 |
| (Denmark) OP Motorsport | 97 | (Denmark) Ole Petersen | Am | 3–4 |

| Icon | Class |
|---|---|
| P | Pro Cup |
| PA | Pro-Am Cup |
| Am | Am Cup |
| LC | Lamborghini Cup |

== Race results ==
Bold indicates the overall winner.

| Round | | Circuit | Pole position | Pro winners | Pro-Am winners | Am winners | LC Winners |
|---|---|---|---|---|---|---|---|
| 1 | R1 | (France) Circuit Paul Ricard | (Italy) No. 36 Oregon Team | **(Italy) No. 15 Rexal Villorba Corse** | (United Arab Emirates) No. 11 Micanek Motorsport powered by Buggyra | No. 5 GT3 Poland | (Denmark) No. 67 DC Motorsport |
| 1 | R1 | (France) Circuit Paul Ricard | (Italy) Patrik Fraboni **(Denmark) Silas Rytter** | **(Italy) Nicholas Pujatti** **(Italy) Benedetto Strignano** | (Czech Republic) Bronislav Formánek (South Africa) Anthony Pretorius | (Poland) Grzegorz Moczulski | (Denmark) Peder Møller Demant (Denmark) Nina Østergaard |
| 1 | R2 | (France) Circuit Paul Ricard | (United Arab Emirates) No. 11 Micanek Motorsport powered by Buggyra | **(Italy) No. 72 DL Racing** | (United Arab Emirates) No. 11 Micanek Motorsport powered by Buggyra | (France) No. 27 Team CMR | (Italy) No. 8 Rexal Villorba Corse |
| 1 | R2 | (France) Circuit Paul Ricard | (Czech Republic) Bronislav Formánek **(South Africa) Anthony Pretorius** | **(Italy) Simone Iaquinta** **(Switzerland) Kevin Gilardoni** | (Czech Republic) Bronislav Formánek (South Africa) Anthony Pretorius | (Belgium) Rodrigue Gillion (Belgium) Stéphane Lémeret | (France) Donovan Privitelio (San Marino) Luciano Privitelio |
| 2 | R1 | (Italy) Imola Circuit | (Italy) No. 33 Auto Sport Racing Service | **(Italy) No. 36 Oregon Team** | (Italy) No. 61 Oregon Team | (Italy) No. 96 Automobile Tricolore | (Italy) No. 3 Auto Sport Racing Service |
| 2 | R1 | (Italy) Imola Circuit | **(Serbia) Miloš Pavlović** (Italy) Alessio Ruffini | **(Italy) Patrik Fraboni** **(Denmark) Silas Rytter** | (Czech Republic) Josef Knopp (Italy) Pietro Perolini | (Italy) Raffaele Giannoni | (Serbia) Petar Matić |
| 2 | R2 | (Italy) Imola Circuit | (Italy) No. 66 VSR | **(Italy) No. 36 Oregon Team** | (Italy) No. 33 Auto Sport Racing Service | No. 16 GT3 Poland | (Italy) No. 14 Oregon Team |
| 2 | R2 | (Italy) Imola Circuit | (Portugal) Miguel Cristóvão **(France) Paul Levet** | **(Italy) Patrik Fraboni** **(Denmark) Silas Rytter** | (Serbia) Miloš Pavlović (Italy) Alessio Ruffini | (Poland) Adrian Lewandowski (Poland) Andrzej Lewandowski | (Brazil) Adalberto Baptista |
| 3 | R1 | (Belgium) Circuit de Spa-Francorchamps | (Germany) No. 44 Leipert Motorsport | (Italy) No. 36 Oregon Team | **(United Arab Emirates) No. 11 Micanek Motorsport powered by Buggyra** | (Germany) No. 89 Leipert Motorsport | (Italy) No. 23 DL Racing |
| 3 | R1 | (Belgium) Circuit de Spa-Francorchamps | **(Sweden) Axel Bengtsson** (Sweden) Manz Thalin | (Italy) Patrik Fraboni (Denmark) Silas Rytter | **(Czech Republic) Bronislav Formánek** **(South Africa) Anthony Pretorius** | (Australia) Todd Kingsford | (Italy) Francesco Turzo |
| 3 | R2 | (Belgium) Circuit de Spa-Francorchamps | (Germany) No. 75 HZO Fortis Racing by Leipert Motorsport | **(Germany) No. 44 Leipert Motorsport** | (Kazakhstan) No. 12 ART-Line | (Germany) No. 89 Leipert Motorsport | (Italy) No. 86 Auto Sport Racing Service |
| 3 | R2 | (Belgium) Circuit de Spa-Francorchamps | **(New Zealand) Chris van der Drift** (Malaysia) Hairie Zairel Oh | **(Sweden) Axel Bengtsson** **(Sweden) Manz Thalin** | (Kazakhstan) Shota Abkhazava (Kyrgyzstan) Egor Orudzhev | (Australia) Todd Kingsford | (Indonesia) Umar Abdullah Basalamah |
| 4 | R1 | (Germany) Nürburgring | (Italy) No. 66 VSR | **(Italy) No. 72 DL Racing** | (Italy) No. 66 VSR | (United Arab Emirates) No. 46 Micanek Motorsport powered by Buggyra | (Italy) No. 4 Rexal Villorba Corse |
| 4 | R1 | (Germany) Nürburgring | (Portugal) Miguel Cristóvão **(France) Paul Levet** | **(Italy) Simone Iaquinta** **(Switzerland) Kevin Gilardoni** | (Portugal) Miguel Cristóvão (France) Paul Levet | (Czech Republic) Jakub Knoll (Belgium) Renaud Kuppens | (Belgium) Claude-Yves Gosselin |
| 4 | R2 | (Germany) Nürburgring | (Italy) No. 32 Auto Sport Racing Service | **(Italy) No. 72 DL Racing** | (Italy) No. 32 Auto Sport Racing Service | (France) No. 27 Team CMR | (Italy) No. 4 Rexal Villorba Corse |
| 4 | R2 | (Germany) Nürburgring | (Italy) Paolo Biglieri **(Italy) Marzio Moretti** | **(Italy) Simone Iaquinta** **(Switzerland) Kevin Gilardoni** | (Italy) Paolo Biglieri (Italy) Marzio Moretti | (Belgium) Rodrigue Gillion (Belgium) Stéphane Lémeret | (Belgium) Claude-Yves Gosselin |
| 5 | R1 | (Spain) Circuit de Barcelona-Catalunya | (Italy) No. 36 Oregon Team | race cancelled due to adverse weather conditions | | | |
| 5 | R1 | (Spain) Circuit de Barcelona-Catalunya | (Italy) Patrik Fraboni **(Denmark) Silas Rytter** | race cancelled due to adverse weather conditions | | | |
| 5 | R2 | (Spain) Circuit de Barcelona-Catalunya | (Italy) No. 72 DL Racing | **(Germany) No. 88 Leipert Motorsport** | (United Arab Emirates) No. 11 Micanek Motorsport powered by Buggyra | (United Arab Emirates) No. 46 Micanek Motorsport powered by Buggyra | (Denmark) No. 67 DC Motorsport |
| 5 | R2 | (Spain) Circuit de Barcelona-Catalunya | **(Italy) Simone Iaquinta** (Switzerland) Kevin Gilardoni | **(Finland) Matias Salonen** **(Finland) Henri Tuomaala** | (Czech Republic) Bronislav Formánek (South Africa) Anthony Pretorius | (Czech Republic) Jakub Knoll (Belgium) Renaud Kuppens | (Denmark) Peder Møller Demant (Denmark) Nina Østergaard |
| 6 | R1 | (Italy) Monza Circuit | (United Arab Emirates) No. 11 Micanek Motorsport powered by Buggyra | **(Germany) No. 70 Leipert Motorsport** | (United Arab Emirates) No. 11 Micanek Motorsport powered by Buggyra | (Italy) No. 16 Auto Sport Racing Service | (Denmark) No. 67 DC Motorsport |
| 6 | R1 | (Italy) Monza Circuit | (Czech Republic) Bronislav Formánek **(South Africa) Anthony Pretorius** | **(New Zealand) Brendon Leitch** **(Australia) Nicolas Stati** | (Czech Republic) Bronislav Formánek (South Africa) Anthony Pretorius | (Poland) Andrzej Lewandowski | (Denmark) Peder Møller Demant (Denmark) Nina Østergaard |
| 6 | R2 | (Italy) Monza Circuit | (Italy) No. 32 Auto Sport Racing Service | **(Germany) No. 88 Leipert Motorsport** | (Italy) No. 32 Auto Sport Racing Service | (Italy) No. 16 Auto Sport Racing Service | (Italy) No. 4 Rexal Villorba Corse |
| 6 | R2 | (Italy) Monza Circuit | (Italy) Paolo Biglieri **(Italy) Marzio Moretti** | **(Finland) Matias Salonen** **(Finland) Henri Tuomaala** | (Italy) Paolo Biglieri (Italy) Marzio Moretti | (Poland) Andrzej Lewandowski | (Belgium) Claude-Yves Gosselin |
| WF | R1 | (Italy) Monza Circuit | (United States) No. 129 TR3 Racing | **(United States) No. 129 TR3 Racing** | (United Arab Emirates) No. 11 Micanek Motorsport powered by Buggyra | (Italy) No. 16 Auto Sport Racing Service | (United States) No. 199 Topp Racing |
| WF | R1 | (Italy) Monza Circuit | (United States) Elias De La Torre IV **(Denmark) Dennis Lind** | **(United States) Elias De La Torre IV** **(Denmark) Dennis Lind** | (Czech Republic) Bronislav Formánek (South Africa) Anthony Pretorius | (Poland) Andrzej Lewandowski | (United States) Rocky T Bolduc |
| WF | R2 | (Italy) Monza Circuit | (United States) No. 133 XONINE RACING | **(Germany) No. 70 Leipert Motorsport** | (Italy) No. 298 VSR | (Italy) No. 16 Auto Sport Racing Service | (United States) No. 166 Forty7 Motorsports |
| WF | R2 | (Italy) Monza Circuit | **(New Zealand) Will Bamber** | **(New Zealand) Brendon Leitch** **(Australia) Nicolas Stati** | (Thailand) Todd Kingsford (New Zealand) Chris van der Drift | (Poland) Andrzej Lewandowski | (United States) Christopher Koebbe |

== Championship standings ==
=== Scoring system ===
| Position | 1st | 2nd | 3rd | 4th | 5th | 6th | 7th | 8th | 9th | 10th | Pole |
| Points | 15 | 12 | 10 | 8 | 6 | 5 | 4 | 3 | 2 | 1 | 1 |

=== Pro ===
| Pos. | Driver | Team(s) | (France) LEC | | (Italy) IMO | | (Belgium) SPA | | (Germany) NUR | | (Spain) BAR (Note: Race 1 was cancelled due to adverse weather conditions. Only points for pole position were awarded.) | | (Italy) MNZ | | Points |
|---|---|---|---|---|---|---|---|---|---|---|---|---|---|---|---|
| 1 | (Switzerland) Kevin Gilardoni (Italy) Simone Iaquinta | (Italy) DL Racing | 2 | 1 | 2 | 3 | 2 | Ret | 1 | 1 | C | 3 | 2 | 9 | 119 |
| 2 | (Italy) Patrik Fraboni (Denmark) Silas Rytter | (Italy) Oregon Team | 3 | 3 | 1 | 1 | 1 | 4 | 4 | 2 | C | 2 | Ret | Ret | 103 |
| 3 | (Finland) Matias Salonen (Finland) Henri Tuomaala | (Germany) Leipert Motorsport | 4 | 4 | 6 | 8 | 4 | 3 | 6 | 5 | C | 1 | 3 | 1 | 96 |
| 4 | (Italy) Nicholas Pujatti (Italy) Benedetto Strignano | (Italy) Rexal Villorba Corse | 1 | 2 | 5 | 2 | 7 | 2 | 3 | Ret | C | Ret | 4 | 4 | 87 |
| 5 | (Sweden) Axel Bengtsson (Sweden) Manz Thalin | (Germany) Leipert Motorsport | 5 | 5 | 7 | 7 | 6 | 1 | 10 | 3 | C | 4 | WD | 8 | 65 |
| 6 | (Poland) Jerzy Spinkiewicz | (Poland) UNIQ Racing | Ret | Ret | 3 | Ret | 3 | 6 | 2 | 4 | C | 6 | Ret | 6 | 59 |
| 7 | (Brazil) Rogério Leitzke Grotta (Italy) Alfio Andrea Spina | (Italy) Oregon Team | 7 | 8 | 4 | 5 | 5 | 5 | 5 | Ret | C | 7 | 5 | 5 | 55 |
| 8 | (Switzerland) Nathanael Berreby (France) Hugo Giraud | (Italy) Rexal Villorba Corse | 6 | 7 | Ret | 4 | 8 | Ret | 9 | 8 | C | 5 | 8 | 3 | 44 |
| 9 | (New Zealand) Brendon Leitch | (Germany) Leipert Motorsport | | | | | | | | | | | 1 | 2 | 27 |
| 10 | (United Kingdom) Finley Green | (Italy) VSR | Ret | 6 | Ret | 6 | WD | WD | 7 | 6 | C | Ret | 7 | Ret | 23 |
| 11 | (United Kingdom) Euan Hankey | (Italy) VSR | | | Ret | 6 | WD | WD | 7 | 6 | C | Ret | 7 | Ret | 18 |
| 12 | (Brazil) Joao Paulo Diaz Balesteiro (United States) Barrett Wolfe | (Germany) Leipert Motorsport | | | | | | | 8 | 7 | | | 6 | 7 | 16 |
Guest drivers ineligible to score points
| – | (Australia) Nicolas Stati | (Germany) Leipert Motorsport | | | | | | | | | | | 1 | 2 | – |
| Pos. | Driver | Team(s) | (France) LEC | | (Italy) IMO | | (Belgium) SPA | | (Germany) NUR | | (Spain) BAR | | (Italy) MNZ | | Points |

=== Pro-Am ===
| Pos. | Driver | Team(s) | (France) LEC | | (Italy) IMO | | (Belgium) SPA | | (Germany) NUR | | (Spain) BAR | | (Italy) MNZ | | Points |
|---|---|---|---|---|---|---|---|---|---|---|---|---|---|---|---|
| 1 | (Czech Republic) Bronislav Formánek (South Africa) Anthony Pretorius | (United Arab Emirates) Micanek Motorsport powered by Buggyra | 1 | 1 | 6 | 3 | 1 | 5 | 2 | 2 | C | 1 | 1 | 7 | 127 |
| 2 | (Italy) Paolo Biglieri (Italy) Marzio Moretti | (Italy) Auto Sport Racing Service | 3 | 3 | 2 | 2 | 7 | 4 | 3 | 1 | C | Ret | 2 | 1 | 110 |
| 3 | (Czech Republic) Josef Knopp (Italy) Pietro Perolini | (Italy) Oregon Team | 2 | 2 | 1 | 5 | 5 | 8 | 5 | 3 | C | 2 | 3 | 4 | 100 |
| 4 | (Portugal) Miguel Cristóvão (France) Paul Levet | (Italy) VSR | 4 | 4 | 5 | 6 | 3 | 2 | 1 | 4 | C | Ret | 7 | 2 | 93 |
| 5 | (Serbia) Miloš Pavlović (Italy) Alessio Ruffini | (Italy) Auto Sport Racing Service | 5 | 5 | 3 | 1 | 6 | 7 | 4 | 5 | C | 5 | Ret | Ret | 69 |
| 6 | (Estonia) Sergei Astafjev (Venezuela) Jonathan Cecotto | (Italy) Invictus Corse | 7 | 6 | 4 | 4 | 9 | 6 | 7 | 6 | C | 4 | 6 | 3 | 66 |
| 7 | (New Zealand) Chris van der Drift | (Germany) HZO Fortis Racing by Leipert Motorsport | | | | | 8 | 9 | 6 | 7 | | | | | 24 |
| 7 | (New Zealand) Chris van der Drift | (Germany) Leipert Motorsport | | | | | | | | | C | 3 | | | 24 |
| 8 | (Kazakhstan) Shota Abkhazava (Kyrgyzstan) Egor Orudzhev | (Kazakhstan) ART-Line | | | | | 4 | 1 | | | | | | | 23 |
| 9 | (New Zealand) Brendon Leitch (United States) Donald Yount | (Germany) Leipert Motorsport | | | | | 2 | 3 | | | | | | | 22 |
| 10 | (Denmark) Mathias Chrone (Denmark) Peter Hegelund | (Denmark) DC Motorsport | 6 | 7 | | | | | | | | | 4 | 5 | 14 |
| 11 | (Malaysia) Hairie Zairel Oh | (Germany) Leipert Motorsport | | | | | 8 | 9 | 6 | 7 | | | | | 14 |
| 12 | (Australia) Todd Kingsford | (Germany) Leipert Motorsport | | | | | | | | | C | 3 | | | 10 |
Guest drivers ineligible to score points
| – | (Italy) Luigi Ferrara (Italy) Francesco Galli | (Italy) DL Racing | | | | | | | | | | | 5 | 6 | – |
| Pos. | Driver | Team(s) | (France) LEC | | (Italy) IMO | | (Belgium) SPA | | (Germany) NUR | | (Spain) BAR | | (Italy) MNZ | | Points |

=== Am ===
| Pos. | Driver | Team(s) | (France) LEC | | (Italy) IMO | | (Belgium) SPA | | (Germany) NUR | | (Spain) BAR | | (Italy) MNZ | | Points |
|---|---|---|---|---|---|---|---|---|---|---|---|---|---|---|---|
| 1 | (Czech Republic) Jakub Knoll (Belgium) Renaud Kuppens | (United Arab Emirates) Micanek Motorsport powered by Buggyra | 2 | 3 | 5 | 4 | 5 | 2 | 1 | 2 | C | 1 | Ret | 2 | 112 |
| 2 | (Belgium) Rodrigue Gillion (Belgium) Stéphane Lémeret | (France) Team CMR | Ret | 1 | 6 | 5 | 4 | 3 | 3 | 1 | C | 2 | 2 | 3 | 108 |
| 3 | (Poland) Grzegorz Moczulski | GT3 Poland | 1 | 2 | 4 | 7 | 3 | 4 | 4 | 4 | C | Ret | 4 | 5 | 87 |
| 4 | (Poland) Andrzej Lewandowski | GT3 Poland | | | 2 | 1 | | | | | | | | | 59 |
| 4 | (Poland) Andrzej Lewandowski | (Italy) Auto Sport Racing Service | | | | | | | | | | | 1 | 1 | 59 |
| 5 | (Saudi Arabia) Karim Ojjeh | (Italy) Rexal Villorba Corse | | | 3 | 2 | 7 | 5 | 2 | 3 | C | DNS | | | 54 |
| 6 | (Italy) Raffaele Giannoni | (Italy) Automobile Tricolore | | | 1 | 3 | | | | | | | 3 | 4 | 43 |
| 7 | (Australia) Todd Kingsford | (Germany) Leipert Motorsport | | | | | 1 | 1 | | | | | | | 30 |
| 8 | (Poland) Adrian Lewandowski | GT3 Poland | | | 2 | 1 | | | | | | | | | 28 |
| 9 | (Denmark) Ulrich Niels Nybøe | (Denmark) DC Motorsport | | | 7 | 6 | 2 | 6 | | | C | WD | | | 26 |
| 10 | (Denmark) Ole Petersen | (Denmark) OP Motorsport | | | | | 6 | Ret | 5 | 5 | | | | | 18 |
| 11 | (Denmark) Peter Hegelund | (Denmark) DC Motorsport | | | | | 2 | 6 | | | | | | | 17 |
| 12 | (Denmark) Ulrik Larsen | (Denmark) DC Motorsport | | | 7 | 6 | | | | | | | | | 9 |
| – | (Switzerland) Cedric Leimer (Switzerland) Laurent Jenny | (Switzerland) Autovitesse | | | Ret | Ret | | | | | | | | | – |
| – | (Belgium) Frédéric Bouvy | (France) Team CMR | | | | | WD | WD | | | | | | | – |
Guest drivers ineligible to score points
| – | (Italy) Francesco Galli | (Italy) DL Racing | | | | | | | | | C | 3 | | | – |
| Pos. | Driver | Team(s) | (France) LEC | | (Italy) IMO | | (Belgium) SPA | | (Germany) NUR | | (Spain) BAR | | (Italy) MNZ | | Points |

=== Lamborghini Cup ===
| Pos. | Driver | Team(s) | (France) LEC | | (Italy) IMO | | (Belgium) SPA | | (Germany) NUR | | (Spain) BAR | | (Italy) MNZ | | Points |
|---|---|---|---|---|---|---|---|---|---|---|---|---|---|---|---|
| 1 | (Denmark) Peder Møller Demant (Denmark) Nina Østergaard | (Denmark) DC Motorsport | 1 | 5 | Ret | 5 | 4 | 2 | 8 | 2 | C | 1 | 1 | 2 | 105 |
| 2 | (Belgium) Claude-Yves Gosselin | (Italy) Rexal Villorba Corse | 2 | 2 | 3 | Ret | WD | WD | 1 | 1 | C | 3 | 2 | 1 | 102 |
| 3 | (Brazil) Adalberto Baptista | (Italy) Oregon Team | 6 | 3 | 7 | 1 | 2 | 4 | 2 | 8 | C | 8 | 6 | 4 | 84 |
| 4 | (Italy) Francesco Turzo | (Italy) DL Racing | 4 | 4 | 6 | 6 | 1 | 6 | 9 | 4 | C | 2 | 5 | 6 | 81 |
| 5 | (Germany) Holger Harmsen | GT3 Poland | 5 | Ret | 4 | 2 | 3 | 3 | 7 | 3 | C | 4 | 9 | 3 | 81 |
| 6 | (Indonesia) Umar Abdullah Basalamah | (Italy) Auto Sport Racing Service | 8 | 6 | 2 | 4 | 5 | 1 | 5 | 5 | | | | | 61 |
| 7 | (San Marino) Luciano Privitelio (France) Donovan Privitelio | (Italy) Rexal Villorba Corse | Ret | 1 | Ret | Ret | 6 | 5 | 4 | 6 | C | WD | 3 | 8 | 58 |
| 8 | (Serbia) Petar Matić | (Italy) Auto Sport Racing Service | 7 | WD | 1 | 3 | WD | WD | 3 | 9 | C | 5 | 7 | 5 | 57 |
| 9 | (Hong Kong) Philip Tang | (Italy) DL Racing | 3 | Ret | 5 | Ret | 7 | 7 | 6 | 7 | C | DSQ | 4 | Ret | 42 |
| 10 | (Italy) Cristian Bortolato | (Italy) DL Racing | Ret | 7 | | | | | | | | | | | 4 |
Guest drivers ineligible to score points
| – | (United Kingdom) Philip Truman (Italy) Michele Merendino | (Italy) Rexal Villorba Corse | | | | | | | | | C | 7 | 8 | 7 | – |
| Pos. | Driver | Team(s) | (France) LEC | | (Italy) IMO | | (Belgium) SPA | | (Germany) NUR | | (Spain) BAR | | (Italy) MNZ | | Points |

=== Teams ===
| Pos. | Team | Points |
|---|---|---|
| 1 | (Italy) DL Racing | 123 |
| 2 | (Italy) Oregon Team | 116 |
| 3 | (Germany) Leipert Motorsport | 95 |
| 4 | (Italy) Rexal Villorba Corse | 88 |
| 5 | (Poland) UNIQ Racing | 42 |
| 6 | (Italy) VSR | 21 |
