= Nicolas Stati =

Australian racing driver (born 2008)

- Nationality: (Australia) Australian
- Born: 1 November 2008 (age 18) Perth, Western Australia, Australia

Asian Le Mans Series career
- Debut season: 2026–27
- Current team: Leipert Motorsport
- Categorisation: FIA Silver
- Car number: 63
- Starts: 2
- Wins: 0
- Podiums: 0
- Poles: 0
- Fastest laps: 0
- Best finish: TBD in 2026–27 (GT3)

Previous series
- 2026 2026 2025 2025 2024 2024 2024 2023: Lamborghini Super Trofeo Europe; Indy NXT; Formula Regional Americas; Formula Regional Oceania; Formula 4 South East Asia; Formula 4 Australian Championship; Formula 4 UAE Championship; Formula 4 South East Asia

Championship titles
- 2026: Lamborghini Super Trofeo World Finals – Pro

Nicolas Stati (Note: Sometimes spelled Nicholas Stati.) (born 1 November 2008) is an Australian racing driver who competes in the GT3 class of the Asian Le Mans Series for Leipert Motorsport. He previously competed in Indy NXT for Cusick Morgan Motorsports.

Stati won the Lamborghini Super Trofeo World Finals with Leipert Motorsport in 2026 alongside Brendon Leitch.

== Career ==
Stati made his car racing debut in late 2023, joining AGI Sport to compete in the final two rounds of the Formula 4 South East Asia Championship. After finishing out of the points all three races on debut, Stati won race two of the final round of the season at Sepang, en route to a ninth-place points finish. Starting off the season with five podiums in six races at The Bend, Stati then finished second in all three races in Sydney, which helped him end the year runner-up in points after scoring two top-fives in the season finale at Sepang. Returning to the team at the end of the year to race in the Formula Trophy UAE, Stati scored a best result of sixth twice to end the season eighth in points.

Staying in Asia with AGI Sport in 2024, Stati competed in the Formula 4 UAE Championship alongside Peter Bouzinelos, Jack Beeton and Carrie Schreiner. In the five-race winter series, Stati scored a best result of 18th at Dubai and ended the season 33rd in points. Stati remained with AGI Sport for the rest of the year to race in the relaunched Formula 4 Australian Championship. During 2024, Stati also joined Crosslink Kiwi Motorsport to race in the Formula 4 United States Championship. After winning on debut at Road America, Stati won again in the following round at Mid-Ohio, before taking his third and final win of the season in New Jersey. Stati then scored three podiums in the final two rounds, but ended the year runner-up to Daniel Quimby by 4.5 points.

In 2025, Stati made his Formula Regional debut in the Oceania Championship for Kiwi Motorsport. In his rookie season in the series, Stati scored a best result of seventh in race two of the final round at Highlands Motorsport Park to end the winter 15th in points. Remaining with Kiwi Motorsports for the rest of 2025, Stati returned stateside to race in the Formula Regional Americas Championship. Racing in the first four rounds of the season, Stati scored his only podium at Indianapolis by finishing third in race one, before leaving the team and series ahead of the round in New Jersey to make his GB3 debut. Joining Chris Dittmann Racing to race in the Silverstone round of the GB3 Championship, Stati scored a best result of 19th in race two in his only appearance of the season. Following that, Stati made a one-off appearance in the Sepang round of Lamborghini Super Trofeo Asia for Lamborghini Bundang by Racegraph. He then raced in the last round of the Lamborghini Super Trofeo Europe season at Misano, where he won both races, before ending the year with a cameo in Formula Trophy for AGI Sport.

Stati then joined Cusick Morgan Motorsports to race in the 2026 Indy NXT season, in which he took a best result of seventh at Detroit en route to 17th in overall points. Towards the end of the year, Stati reunited with Leipert Motorsport to make his International GT Open alongside Brendon Leitch, before winning the Lamborghini Super Trofeo World Finals at Monza in October alongside Leitch. Following the end of his season in Indy NXT, Stati continued with Leipert Motorsport and joined their GT3 entry for the 2026–27 Asian Le Mans Series.

== Karting record ==
=== Karting career summary ===
Season	Series	Team	Position
2018	HGKC King of the Hill – Cadet 9		2nd
2018	City of Perth Kart Titles – Cadet 9		6th
2019	IAME Asia Cup – Cadet	Energy Corse Asia	9th
2019	ROK Cup Superfinal – Mini ROK	Energy Corse	
2019	Macao International Kart Grand Prix – Mini ROK	G51	25th
2019	HGKC King of the Hill – Cadet 12		9th
2020	City of Perth Kart Titles – Cadet 12		2nd
2021	City of Perth Kart Titles – KA2		6th
2021	Western Australian Karting Championships - KA4 Junior		3rd
2022	Australian Kart Championship – KA2	Energy Corse Australia	57th
2022	SKUSA SuperNationals XXV – X30 Junior	Energy Corse Australia	31st
2022	Trofeo Delle Industrie – OK-J	Energy Corse	NC
2022	City of Perth Kart Titles – KA2		6th
2022	Queensland Kart Championships – KA2		15th
2022	HGKC King of the Hill – KA3 Junior		1st
2022	Bunbury Coastal Classic – KA2		3rd
2023	Australian Kart Championship – KA2	TWM	47th
2023	Rok Cup Superfinal – Junior Rok	Energy Corse	NC
2023	Western Australian Karting Championship – KA3 Junior Light		2nd
2023	City of Perth Kart Titles – KA2		6th
2023	City of Perth Kart Titles – KA3 Junior Light		2nd
2023	City of Melbourne Kart Titles – KA2		19th

== Racing record ==
=== Racing career summary ===
Season	Series	Team	Races	Wins	Poles	F/Laps	Podiums	Points	Position
2023	Formula 4 South East Asia Championship	AGI Sport	6	1	0	0	1	39	9th
2024	Formula 4 UAE Championship	AGI Sport	15	0	0	0	0	0	33rd
2024	Formula 4 Australian Championship	AGI Sport	12	0	0	0	8	175	**2nd**
2024	Formula Trophy UAE	AGI Sport	7	0	0	0	0	39	8th
2024	Formula 4 United States Championship	Crosslink Kiwi Motorsport	14	3	3	4	10	223	**2nd**
2025	Formula Regional Oceania Championship	Kiwi Motorsport	15	0	0	0	0	105	14th
2025	Tasman Series	Kiwi Motorsport	6	0	0	0	0	36	6th
2025	Formula Regional Americas Championship	Kiwi Motorsports	11	0	0	0	1	82	8th
2025	Formula Pro USA Western Championship – FPUSA-3	Atlantic Racing Team	2	0	0	2	2	40	8th
2025	GB3 Championship	Chris Dittmann Racing	3	0	0	0	0	5	35th
2025	Lamborghini Super Trofeo Asia – Pro	Racegraph	4	0	1	0	2	0	NC†
2025	Lamborghini Super Trofeo Europe – Pro	Leipert Motorsport	2	2	1	2	2	0	NC†
2025	Formula Trophy	AGI Sport	4	0	0	2	0	8	18th
2025–26	24H Series Middle East – GT3	Leipert Motorsport	1	0	0	0	0	14	NC
2026	Indy NXT	Cusick Morgan Motorsports	16	0	0	0	0	227	17th
2026	International GT Open	Leipert Motorsport	1	0	0	0	0	0	74th
2026	Lamborghini Super Trofeo Europe – Pro	Leipert Motorsport	2	1	0	0	2	0	NC†
2026	Lamborghini Super Trofeo World Finals – Pro	Leipert Motorsport	2	1	0	0	2	27	**1st**
2026–27	Asian Le Mans Series – GT3	Leipert Motorsport	2	0	0	0	0	0*	28th*

* Season still in progress.

=== Complete Formula 4 South East Asia Championship results ===
(key) (Races in bold indicate pole position; races in italics indicate fastest lap)

Year	Entrant	1	2	3	4	5	6	7	8	9	10	11	Pos	Points
2023	AGI Sport	ZZIC1; 1	ZZIC1; 2	ZZIC1; 3	MAC; 1	MAC; 2	SEP1; 1; 14	SEP1; 2; 11	SEP1; 3; 14	SEP2; 1; 7	SEP2; 2; 1	SEP2; 3; 6	9th	39

=== Complete Formula 4 UAE Championship results ===
(key) (Races in bold indicate pole position) (Races in italics indicate fastest lap)

Year	Team	1	2	3	4	5	6	7	8	9	10	11	12	13	14	15	DC	Points
2024	AGI Sport	YMC1; 1; 30	YMC1; 2; 28	YMC1; 3; 21	YMC2; 1; 29	YMC2; 2; 20	YMC2; 3; 24	DUB1; 1; 19	DUB1; 2; 18	DUB1; 3; 18	YMC3; 1; 21	YMC3; 2; 21	YMC3; 3; 28	DUB2; 1; 23	DUB2; 2; 24	DUB2; 3; 25	33rd	0

=== Complete Formula 4 Australian Championship results ===
(key) (Races in bold indicate pole position; races in italics indicate fastest lap)

Year	Team	1	2	3	4	5	6	7	8	9	10	11	12	DC	Points
2024	AGI Sport	BEN1; 1; 5	BEN1; 2; 3	BEN1; 3; 2	BEN2; 1; 3	BEN2; 2; 3	BEN2; 3; 2	SYD; 1; 2	SYD; 2; 2	SYD; 3; 2	SEP; 1; 6	SEP; 2; 4	SEP; 3; 5	2nd	175

=== Complete Formula 4 United States Championship results ===
(key) (Races in bold indicate pole position) (Races in italics indicate fastest lap)

Year	Team	1	2	3	4	5	6	7	8	9	10	11	12	13	14	15	Pos	Points
2024	Crosslink Kiwi Motorsport	**ROA**; **1**; 1	ROA; 2; 3	ROA; 3; 3	**MOH**; **1**; 1	MOH; 2 C	MOH; 3; 2	**NJM**; **1**; 2	NJM; 2; 1	NJM; 3; 5	MOS; 1; 2	MOS; 2; 4	MOS; 3; 3	COA; 1; 2	COA; 2; 6	COA; 3; 5	2nd	223

=== Complete Formula Trophy UAE / Formula Trophy results ===
(key) (Races in bold indicate pole position; races in italics indicate fastest lap)

Year	Team	1	2	3	4	5	6	7	DC	Points
2024	AGI Sport	DUB; 1; 8	DUB; 2; 6	DUB; 3; 7	YMC1; 1; 7	YMC1; 2; 6	YMC2; 1; 10	YMC2; 2; 7	8th	39
2025	AGI Sport	DUB; 1	DUB; 2	DUB; 3	YMC1; 1; 7	YMC1; 2; 15	YMC2; 1; 20	YMC2; 2; 9	18th	8

=== Complete Formula Regional Oceania Championship Results ===
(key) (Races in bold indicate pole position) (Races in italics indicate fastest lap)

Year	Team	1	2	3	4	5	6	7	8	9	10	11	12	13	14	15	DC	Points
2025	Kiwi Motorsport	TAU; 1; 13	TAU; 2 Ret	TAU; 3; 14	HMP; 1; 12	HMP; 2; 12	HMP; 3; 13	MAN; 1; 10	MAN; 2; 10	MAN; 3; 14	TER; 1; 12	TER; 2 Ret	TER; 3; 12	HIG; 1; 14	HIG; 2; 7	HIG; 3; 11	14th	105

==== Complete New Zealand Grand Prix results ====
Year	Team	Car	Qualifying	Main race
2025	(New Zealand) Kiwi Motorsport	Tatuus FT-60 - Toyota	11th	11th

=== Complete Formula Regional Americas Championship results ===
(key) (Races in bold indicate pole position) (Races in italics indicate fastest lap)

Year	Team	1	2	3	4	5	6	7	8	9	10	11	12	13	14	15	16	17	18	19	20	21	22	DC	Points
2025	Kiwi Motorsports	NOL; 1; 11	NOL; 2; 8	NOL; 3; 6	ROA; 1; 5	ROA; 2; 6	ROA; 3; 4	IMS; 1 C	IMS; 2; 3	IMS; 3; 5	MOH; 1; 5	MOH; 2; 5	MOH; 3 Ret	NJM; 1	NJM; 2	NJM; 3	MOS; 1	MOS; 2	MOS; 3	VIR; 1	VIR; 2	ALA; 2	ALA; 2	8th	82

=== Complete GB3 Championship results ===
(key) (Races in bold indicate pole position) (Races in italics indicate fastest lap)

Year	Team	1	2	3	4	5	6	7	8	9	10	11	12	13	14	15	16	17	18	19	20	21	22	23	24	DC	Points
2025	Chris Dittmann Racing	SIL1; 1	SIL1; 2	SIL1; 3	ZAN; 1	ZAN; 2	ZAN; 3	SPA; 1	SPA; 2	SPA; 3	HUN; 1	HUN; 2	HUN; 3	SIL2; 1; 21	SIL2; 2; 19	SIL2; 3; 21^{2}	BRH; 1	BRH; 2	BRH; 3	DON; 1	DON; 2	DON; 3	MNZ; 1	MNZ; 2	MNZ; 3	35th	4

=== American open–wheel results ===
==== Indy NXT ====
(key) (Races in bold indicate pole position) (Races in italics indicate fastest lap) (Races with ^{L} indicate a race lap led) (Races with * indicate most race laps led)

Year	Team	1	2	3	4	5	6	7	8	9	10	11	12	13	14	15	16	17	Rank	Points
2026	Cusick Morgan Motorsports	STP; 16	ARL; 21	BAR; 10	BAR; 15	IMS; 14	IMS; 21	DET; 7	GAT	ROA; 17	ROA; 12	MOH; 23	MOH; 17	NSS; 15	POR; 23	MIL; 13	LAG; 17	LAG; 15	17th	227

=== Complete Asian Le Mans Series results ===
(key) (Races in bold indicate pole position; results in italics indicate fastest lap)

Year	Entrant	Class	Chassis	Engine	1	2	3	4	5	6	Rank	Points
2026–27	Leipert Motorsport	GT3	Lamborghini Temerario GT3	Lamborghini L411 4.0 L Turbo V8	LEC; 1 Ret	LEC; 2; 22	JER; 1	JER; 2	POR; 1	POR; 2	28th*	0*

* Season still in progress.
