= Lamborghini Super Trofeo =

One-make racing series by Lamborghini Squadra Corse

- Category: One-make racing by Lamborghini
- Country: International; Asia; North America; Europe; Middle East (formerly)
- Inaugural season: 2009
- Constructors: Lamborghini
- Tyre suppliers: Pirelli (2009-2022); Hankook (2023-2026)
- Official website: Lamborghini Super Trofeo series

The Lamborghini Super Trofeo is an international motor racing series. The Lamborghini Super Trofeo is the one-make championship organized by Lamborghini Squadra Corse. The series involves exclusively Huracán Super Trofeo Evo model cars in 3 continental series: Europe, Asia, and North America. The three continental series all have a common format: six double races, each 50 minutes long, on the world’s most prestigious circuits, completed by a World Final that decrees the Lamborghini world champions.

Lamborghini Super Trofeo drivers compete in identical Lamborghini Huracán Super Trofeo EVO2 cars, based on the Lamborghini Huracán replacing the older Gallardo version. The drivers are also divided according to categories: Pro, Pro-Am, Am, and LB Cup.

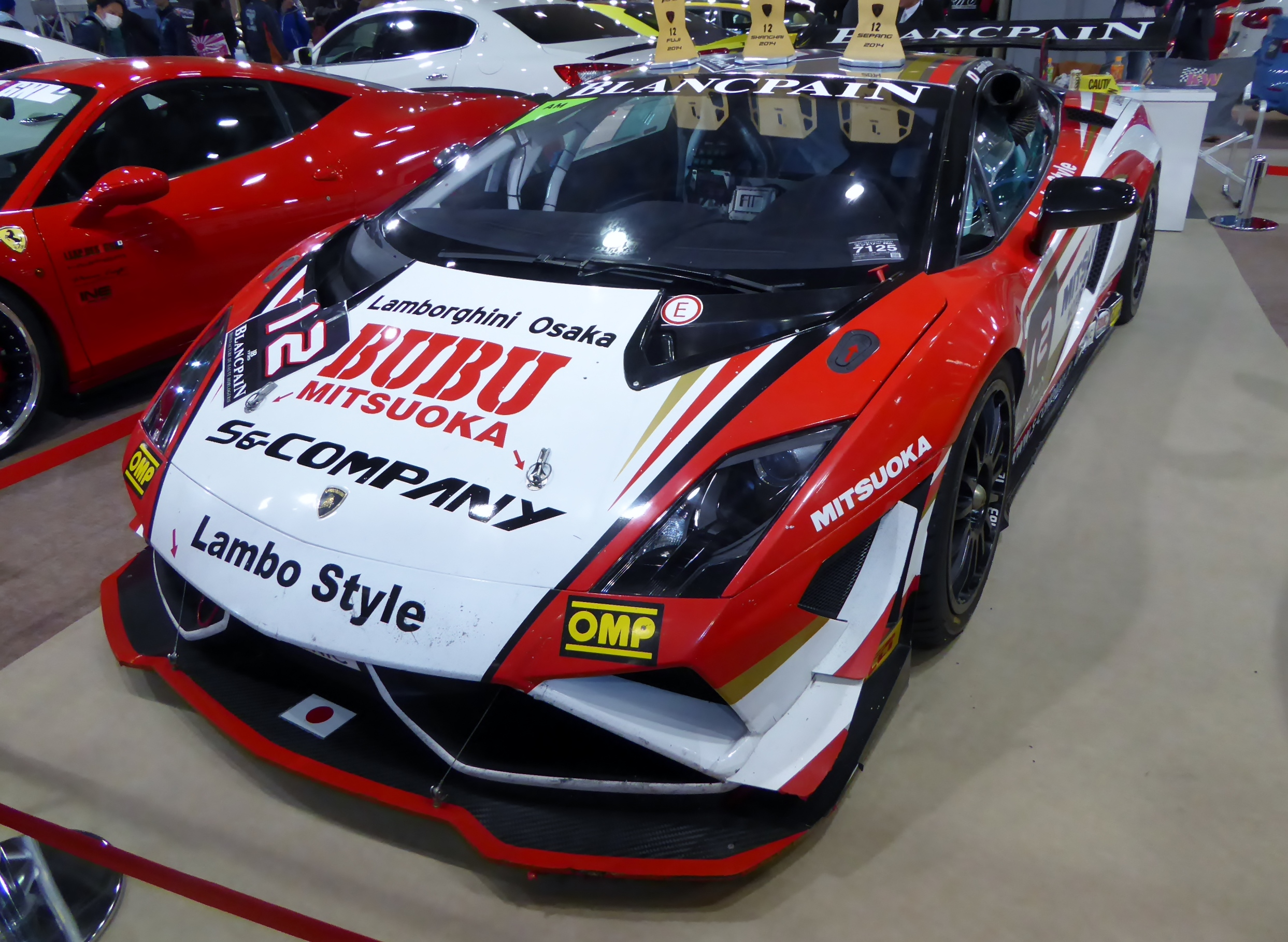
Lamborghini Gallardo Super Trofeo

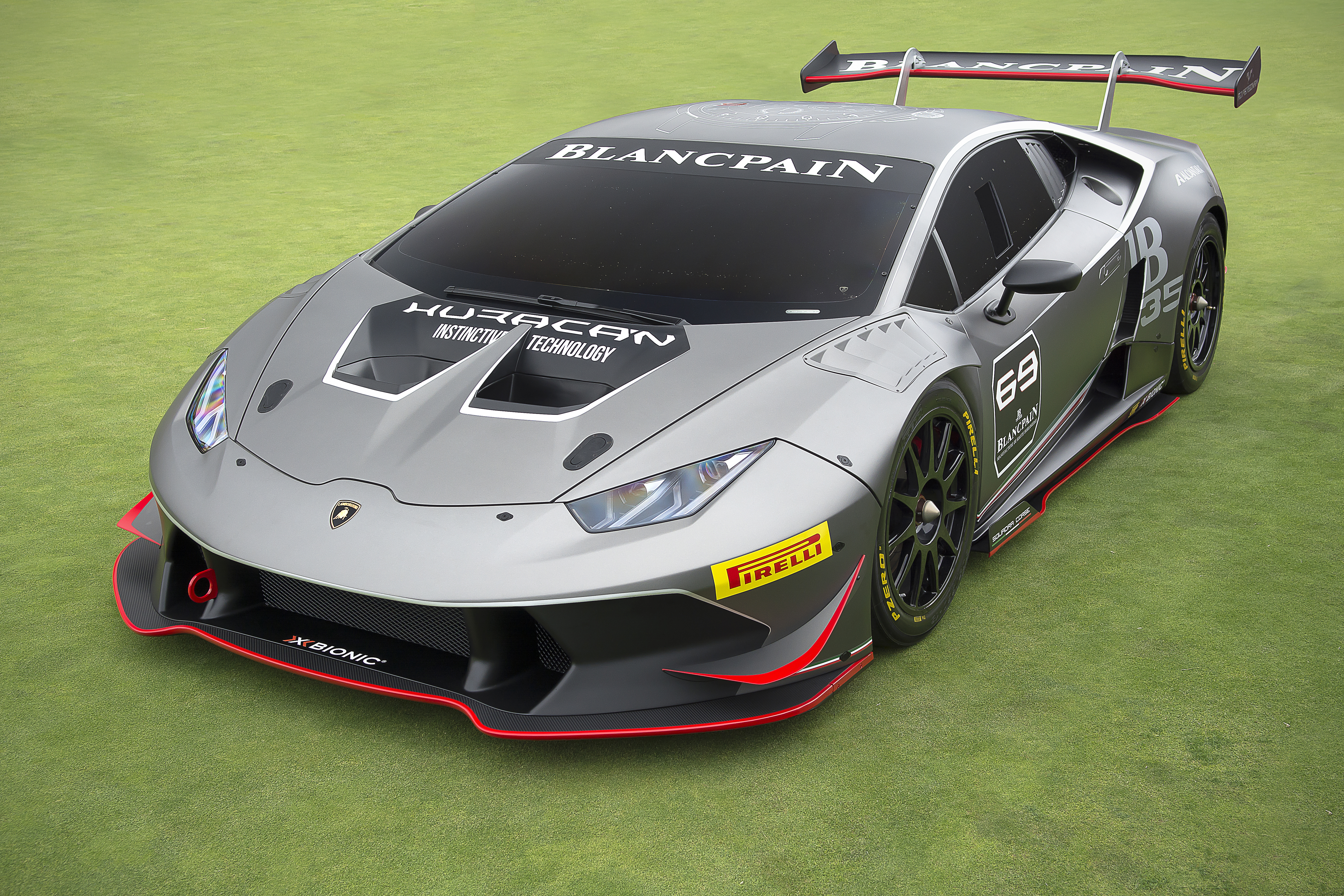
Lamborghini Huracán Super Trofeo

From the 2027 season onwards, drivers will compete in identical Lamborghini Temerario Super Trofeo cars, effectively replacing the Huracán.

== Championships ==
=== International ===
- Lamborghini Super Trofeo World Final (2013– )

=== Regional ===
- Lamborghini Super Trofeo Europe (2009– )
- Lamborghini Super Trofeo Asia (2012– )
- Lamborghini Super Trofeo North America (2013– )
- Lamborghini Super Trofeo Middle East (2017–2019)

== Champions ==
=== Super Trofeo Europe ===
==== Drivers ====
Year	Pro	Pro-Am	Am	Gallardo Am	LB Gentleman Trophy
2009	(Italy) Fabio Babini	(Italy) Claudio Rossetto	not held	not held	not held
2010	(Italy) Mirko Venturi	(Italy) Eugenio Amos	not held	not held	not held
2011	(Italy) Fabio Babini	(Switzerland) Cédric Leimer	not held	not held	not held
2012	not held	(Switzerland) Cédric Leimer	(Italy) Leonardo Geraci	not held	not held
2013	not held	(Italy) Andrea Amici	(Switzerland) Laurent Jenny	not held	not held
2014	(Serbia) Miloš Pavlović (Italy) Edoardo Piscopo	(Italy) Alberto Di Folco	(Italy) Simone Pellegrinelli	not held	not held
2015	(Finland) Patrick Kujala	(Italy) Loris Spinelli	(Georgia (country)) Shota Abkhazava	(Portugal) Carina Lima (Italy) Andrea Palma	not held
2016	(Denmark) Dennis Lind	(Finland) Patrick Kujala (Switzerland) Adrian Amstutz	(Nigeria) Nouri Shahin	not held	(Netherlands) Gerard Van Der Horst
2017	(Canada) Mikaël Grenier (Italy) Loris Spinelli	(Germany) Christopher Dreyspring (China) Liang Jiatong	(Poland) Andrzej Lewandowski (Poland) Teodor Myszkowski	not held	(Netherlands) Gerard Van Der Horst
2018	(Italy) Giacomo Altoè	(Colombia) Juan Pérez (Italy) Loris Spinelli	(Germany) Manuel Lauck (Germany) Florian Scholze	not held	(Netherlands) Gerard Van Der Horst
2019	(Russia) Sergei Afanasiev (Netherlands) Danny Kroes	(Georgia (country)) Shota Abkhazava	(France) Nicolas Gomar	not held	(Belgium) Benoît Semoulin (Belgium) François Semoulin
2020	(United Kingdom) Dean Stoneman	(Poland) Karol Basz (Poland) Andrzej Lewandowski	(Luxembourg) Yury Wagner	not held	(Netherlands) Hans Fabri
2021	(Italy) Leonardo Pulcini (Italy) Kevin Gilardoni	(Poland) Andrzej Lewandowski	(France) Claude-Yves Gosselin	not held	(Netherlands) Hans Fabri
2022	(Italy) Loris Spinelli (Netherlands) Max Weering	(Italy) Massimo Ciglia (United Kingdom) Lewis Williamson	(Poland) Andrzej Lewandowski	not held	(Netherlands) Gerard Van Der Horst
2023	(New Zealand) Brendon Leitch	(Poland) Andrzej Lewandowski	(Italy) Gabriel Rindone	not held	(San Marino) Luciano Privitelio (France) Donovan Privitelio
2024	(France) Amaury Bonduel	(Czech Republic) Bronislav Formánek (Czech Republic) Štefan Rosina	(Italy) Piergiacomo Randazzo (France) Stephane Tribaudini	not held	(Kazakhstan) Shota Abkhazava
2025	(Malaysia) Adam Putera	(United Kingdom) Georgi Dimitrov (France) Stéphan Guerin	(Italy) Massimo Ciglia (Italy) Pietro Perolini	not held	(Saudi Arabia) Karim Ojjeh
2026	(Italy) Simone Iaquinta (Switzerland) Kevin Gilardoni	(Czech Republic) Bronislav Formánek (South Africa) Anthony Pretorius	(Czech Republic) Jakub Knoll (Belgium) Renaud Kuppens	not held	(Denmark) Peder Møller Demant (Denmark) Nina Østergaard

==== Teams ====
Year	Overall	Pro	Pro-Am	Am
2009	(Italy) Petri Corse	not awarded	not awarded	not held
2010	(Switzerland) Black Bull Swiss Racing	not awarded	not awarded	not held
2011	(Italy) Autocarrozzeria Imperiale	not awarded	not awarded	not held
2012	not awarded	not held	(Italy) Autocarrozzeria Imperiale	(Italy) Autocarrozzeria Imperiale
2013	not awarded	not held	(Italy) Autocarrozzeria Imperiale	(Switzerland) Autovitesse Garage R. Affolter
2014	not awarded	(Italy) Bonaldi Motorsport	(Italy) Bonaldi Motorsport	(Italy) DTMotorsport
2015	not awarded	(Italy) Bonaldi Motorsport		
2016	not held	(Italy) Raton Racing	(Italy) Bonaldi Motorsport	(Germany) Leipert Motorsport
2017	(Italy) Antonelli Motorsport			
2018	(Italy) Antonelli Motorsport			
2019	(Italy) Bonaldi Motorsport			
2020	(Italy) Target Racing			
2021	(Italy) Oregon Team			
2022	(Italy) Bonaldi Motorsport			
2023	(Italy) VSR			
2024	(Italy) Target Racing			
2025	(Italy) Target Racing			
2026	(Italy) DL Racing			

=== Super Trofeo Asia ===
==== Drivers ====
Year	Pro	Pro-Am	Am	Lamborghini Cup
2012		(China) Anthony Liu (Italy) Davide Rizzo	(China) Chen Ke Kan	
2013		(Italy) Massimiliano Wiser (China) Jiang Xin	(China) Ting Zheng (China) Steven Lin	
2014		(Italy) Massimiliano Wiser (China) Jiang Xin	(Japan) Toshiyuki Ochiai	
2015	(Malaysia) Afiq Yazid	(Italy) Edoardo Liberati (China) Yuan Bo	(Japan) Akira Mizutani (Japan) Hajime Noma	
2016	(Japan) Toshiyuki Ochiai (Malaysia) Afiq Yazid	(India) Armaan Ebrahim (Sri Lanka) Dilantha Malagamuwa	(Indonesia) Andrew Haryanto	(Thailand) Supachai Weeraborwornpong
2017	(Japan) Kei Cozzolino (Malaysia) Afiq Yazid	(Netherlands) Rik Breukers (United Kingdom) Nigel Farmer	(Indonesia) Andrew Haryanto	(Thailand) Supachai Weeraborwornpong
2018	(Italy) Andrea Amici (Poland) Artur Janosz	(Finland) Mikko Eskelinen (Finland) Juuso Puhakka	(Thailand) Suttiluck Buncharoen	(Hong Kong) Poh Wah Wong
2019	(Chinese Taipei) Evan Chen (New Zealand) Chris van der Drift	(Japan) Toshiyuki Ochiai (Malaysia) Afiq Yazid	(China) Huilin Han	(Hong Kong) Clement Li
2023	(New Zealand) Marco Giltrap (New Zealand) Chris van der Drift	(Hong Kong) Dan Wells (Taiwan) Oscar Lee	(Thailand) Aniwat Lommahadthai (Thailand) Pasarit Promsombat	(Thailand) Supachai Weeraborwornpong
2024	(Hong Kong) Dan Wells	(China) Fangping Chen (Macau) André Couto	(South Korea) Brian Changwoo Lee	(Malaysia) Hairie Zairel Oh (Malaysia) Haziq Zairel Oh
2025	(Macau) Hon Chio Leong (Republic of Ireland) Alex Denning	(China) Qikuan Cao (Hong Kong) Liu Kai Shun	(Thailand) Suttiluck Buncharoen	(Thailand) Supachai Weeraborwornpong
2026	(United Kingdom) Will Tregurtha	(Thailand) Todd Kingsford (New Zealand) Chris van der Drift	(Thailand) Suttiluck Buncharoen	(Thailand) Supachai Weeraborwornpong

==== Teams ====
List of Lamborghini Super Trofeo Asia Teams' Champions
Year	Champions	Car Used	Ref
2012	China Automobile Association via (JRM / ART)	Lamborghini Gallardo LP 570-4 Super Trofeo	
2013	(China) JRM	Lamborghini Gallardo LP 570-4 Super Trofeo	
2014	(Japan) HoJust Racing via (Team Wakayama)	Lamborghini Gallardo LP 570-4 Super Trofeo	
2015	(Malaysia) Lamborghini Kuala Lumpur via (JH Italia)	Lamborghini Huracán LP 620-2 Super Trofeo	
2016	(Japan) Lazy Boy Racing	Lamborghini Huracán LP 620-2 Super Trofeo	
2017	(Japan) Clazzio Racing via (Direction Racing)	Lamborghini Huracán LP 620-2 Super Trofeo	
2018	(China) FFF Racing Team by ACM	Lamborghini Huracán LP 620-2 Super Trofeo	
2019	(Taiwan) Gama Racing	Lamborghini Huracán LP 620-2 Super Trofeo EVO	
2020–2022: Seasons canceled due to COVID-19 global travel restrictions
2023	(China) Absolute Racing	Lamborghini Huracán Super Trofeo EVO2	
2024	(Malaysia) DW Evans GT	Lamborghini Huracán Super Trofeo EVO2	
2025	(Macau) SJM Theodore Racing via ( (Malaysia) DW Evans GT)	Lamborghini Huracán Super Trofeo EVO2	
2026	(Italy) VSR (Vincenzo Sospiri Racing)	Lamborghini Huracán Super Trofeo EVO2	

=== Super Trofeo North America ===
==== Drivers ====
Year	Pro	Pro-Am	Am	
2013	not held	(United States) Kevin Conway	(United States) Tom O'Gara	
2014	not held	(United States) Kevin Conway	(United States) Dillon Machavern	
2015	(United States) Richard Antinucci	(United States) Corey Lewis	(Canada) Ryan Ockey	
2016	(Japan) Shinya Michimi	(United States) Craig Duerson (United States) Trent Hindman	(Canada) Damon Ockey	
Year	Pro	Pro-Am	Am	Lamborghini Cup
2017	(Italy) Riccardo Agostini (United States) Trent Hindman	(Italy) Edoardo Piscopo (United Kingdom) Taylor Proto	(Japan) Yuki Harata	(Colombia) JC Perez
2018	(United States) Corey Lewis (United States) Madison Snow	(Colombia) JC Perez (Italy) Loris Spinelli	(United States) Ryan Hardwick	(United States) Parris Mullins (United Kingdom) Mark Proto
2019	(United States) Richard Antinucci (United States) Corey Lewis	(United States) Jacob Eidson (Canada) Damon Ockey	(United States) McKay Snow	(United States) Mel Johnson
2020	(United States) Madison Snow	(United States) Corey Lewis (United States) McKay Snow	(Puerto Rico) Victor Gomez IV	(United States) Randy Sellari
2021	(United States) Richard Antinucci	(United States) Brandon Gdovic (Puerto Rico) Bryan Ortiz	(United States) Luke Berkeley	(United States) Mark Kvamme (United States) Terry Olson
2022	(Costa Rica) Danny Formal (Canada) Kyle Marcelli	(United States) John Dubets (United States) Bryson Lew	(United States) Shehan Chandrasoma	(United States) Slade Stewart
2023	(Costa Rica) Danny Formal (Canada) Kyle Marcelli	(United States) Keawn Tandon	(United States) Glenn McGee (United States) Anthony McIntosh	(United States) Mark Wilgus
2024	(United States) Ernie Francis Jr. (South Africa) Giano Taurino	(United States) Joel Miller (United States) AJ Muss	(United States) Glenn McGee (United States) Anthony McIntosh	(United States) Nick Groat
2025	(Sweden) Hampus Ericsson (Costa Rica) Danny Formal	(United States) Conrad Geis (United States) Jason Hart	(United States) Graham Doyle (United States) Glenn McGee	(United States) Nick Groat
2026	(United States) Elias De La Torre IV	(United States) Graham Doyle (Costa Rica) Danny Formal	(United States) David Staab	(Canada) Philippe Touchette

==== Teams ====
Year	Overall	Pro	Pro-Am	Am
2013	not awarded	not held	(United States) Change Racing	(United States) GMG Racing
2014	(Italy) Mitchum Motorsports	not held	not held	not held
Year	Huracán	Huracán Dealers		
2015	(United States) O Gara Motorsport			
2016	(United States) Prestige Performance			
Year	Overall	Dealers		
2017	(United States) Prestige Performance	(New Jersey) Paramus		
2018	(United States) Change Racing	(North Carolina) Charlotte		
2019	(United States) Change Racing	(North Carolina) Charlotte		
2020	(United States) Change Racing	(North Carolina) Charlotte		
2021	(United States) Dream Racing Motorsport	(Florida) Palm Beach		
2022	(United States) Precision Performance Motorsports (PPM)	(Florida) Palm Beach		
2023	(United States) Wayne Taylor Racing with Andretti Autosport	(Florida) Palm Beach		
2024	(United States) Wayne Taylor Racing with Andretti	(Florida) Palm Beach		
2025	(United States) Wayne Taylor Racing	(Florida) Palm Beach		
2026	(United States) Wayne Taylor Racing	(Florida) Palm Beach		

=== Super Trofeo Middle East ===
Year	Pro	Pro-Am	Am	Lamborghini Cup
2017	(Netherlands) Rik Breukers (Zimbabwe) Axcil Jefferies	(Germany) Paul Scheuschner (Germany) Hendrik Still	(Indonesia) Andrew Haryanto	(Italy) Gabriele Murroni
2018	(United Kingdom) Jack Bartholomew	(Zimbabwe) Axcil Jefferies (Germany) Carrie Schreiner	(United States) Taylor Proto	(United States) Mark Proto
2019	(Russia) Timur Boguslavskiy (Denmark) Frederik Schandorff	(Canada) Ramez Azzam (Zimbabwe) Axcil Jefferies	(Germany) Vincent Schwartz	(Italy) Gabriele Murroni
2022				

=== Super Trofeo World Final ===
Year		Circuit	Date	Winning drivers (Am)	Winning drivers (LB Cup)	Total Winner (Am)	Total Winner (LB Cup)	Winning drivers (Pro-Am)	Winning drivers (Pro)	Total Winner (Pro-Am)	Total Winner (Pro)	World Champions	Refs
2013	R1	(Italy) ACI Vallelunga Circuit	23 November	(Italy) Alberto Viberti	not held	(Italy) Alberto Viberti	not held	(Italy) Andrea Amici	not held	(United States) Andrew Palmer	not held	(United States) Andrew Palmer	
2013	R2	(Italy) ACI Vallelunga Circuit	23 November	(Italy) Alberto Viberti	not held	(Italy) Alberto Viberti	not held	(United States) Andrew Palmer	not held	(United States) Andrew Palmer	not held	(United States) Andrew Palmer	
2014	R1	(Malaysia) Sepang International Circuit	23 November	(United Kingdom) Jake Rattenbury	not held	(United Kingdom) Jake Rattenbury	not held	(Austria) Gerhard Tweraser (Czech Republic) Tomas Pivoda	(Serbia) Miloš Pavlović (Italy) Edoardo Piscopo	(United States) Kevin Conway (United States) Lawson Aschenbach	(Serbia) Miloš Pavlović (Italy) Edoardo Piscopo	(Serbia) Miloš Pavlović (Italy) Edoardo Piscopo	
2014	R2	(Malaysia) Sepang International Circuit	23 November	(United Kingdom) Jake Rattenbury	not held	(United Kingdom) Jake Rattenbury	not held	(United States) Kevin Conway (United States) Lawson Aschenbach	(Italy) Mirko Bortolotti	(United States) Kevin Conway (United States) Lawson Aschenbach	(Serbia) Miloš Pavlović (Italy) Edoardo Piscopo	(Serbia) Miloš Pavlović (Italy) Edoardo Piscopo	
2015	R1	(United States) Sebring International Raceway	22 November	(Canada) Ryan Ockey	(United States) Josh Hurley	(Canada) Ryan Ockey	(United States) Brandon Gdovic	(United States) Corey Lewis	(Finland) Patrick Kujala	(United States) Corey Lewis	(Finland) Patrick Kujala	(Finland) Patrick Kujala	
2015	R2	(United States) Sebring International Raceway	22 November	(Switzerland) Cédric Leimer (Switzerland) Laurent Jenny	(Argentina) Andrés Josephson (Puerto Rico) Ricardo Vera	(Canada) Ryan Ockey	(United States) Brandon Gdovic	(United States) Corey Lewis	(Austria) Patric Niederhauser	(United States) Corey Lewis	(Finland) Patrick Kujala	(Finland) Patrick Kujala	
2016	R1	(Spain) Circuit Ricardo Tormo	3 December	(Switzerland) Adrian Amstutz	(Thailand) Supachai Weeraborwornpong	(Switzerland) Adrian Amstutz	(United States) Ross Chouest	(Italy) Andrea Fontana (Italy) Lorenzo Veglia	(Italy) Vito Postiglione	(Italy) Andrea Fontana (Italy) Lorenzo Veglia	(Denmark) Dennis Lind	(Denmark) Dennis Lind	
2016	R2	(Spain) Circuit Ricardo Tormo	3 December	(Switzerland) Adrian Amstutz	(United States) Ross Chouest	(Switzerland) Adrian Amstutz	(United States) Ross Chouest	(Japan) Toshiyuki Ochiai (Malaysia) Afiq Yazid	(Denmark) Dennis Lind	(Italy) Andrea Fontana (Italy) Lorenzo Veglia	(Denmark) Dennis Lind	(Denmark) Dennis Lind	
2017	R1	(Italy) Imola Circuit	18 November	(Germany) Philipp Wlazik (Germany) Florian Scholze	(Netherlands) Gerard Van der Horst	(Germany) Philipp Wlazik (Germany) Florian Scholze	(Netherlands) Gerard Van der Horst	(Italy) Edoardo Piscopo (United Kingdom) Taylor Proto	(United States) Trent Hindman (Italy) Riccardo Agostini	(Italy) Edoardo Piscopo (United Kingdom) Taylor Proto	(United States) Trent Hindman (Italy) Riccardo Agostini	(United States) Trent Hindman (Italy) Riccardo Agostini	
2017	R2	(Italy) Imola Circuit	18 November	(Italy) Massimo Mantovani	(Colombia) JC Perez	(Germany) Philipp Wlazik (Germany) Florian Scholze	(Netherlands) Gerard Van der Horst	(Switzerland) Lucas Mauron (France) Nicolas Gomar	(Brazil) Raphael Abbate (Japan) Yuki Nemoto	(Italy) Edoardo Piscopo (United Kingdom) Taylor Proto	(United States) Trent Hindman (Italy) Riccardo Agostini	(United States) Trent Hindman (Italy) Riccardo Agostini	
2018	R1	(Italy) Vallelunga Circuit	17 November	(United States) Ryan Hardwick	(France) Joseph Collado	(United States) Ryan Hardwick	(France) Joseph Collado	(Colombia) JC Perez (Italy) Loris Spinelli	(Japan) Kei Cozzolino (Malaysia) Afiq Yazid	(Colombia) JC Perez (Italy) Loris Spinelli	(Italy) Giacomo Altoè (Italy) Daniel Zampieri	(Italy) Giacomo Altoè	
2018	R2	(Italy) Vallelunga Circuit	17 November	(Canada) Damon Ockey	(United States) Justin Price	(United States) Ryan Hardwick	(France) Joseph Collado	(Sweden) Simon Larsson (Denmark) Dennis Lind	(Italy) Giacomo Altoè (Italy) Daniel Zampieri	(Colombia) JC Perez (Italy) Loris Spinelli	(Italy) Giacomo Altoè (Italy) Daniel Zampieri	(Italy) Giacomo Altoè	
2019	R1	(Spain) Circuito de Jerez	27 October	(United States) Steven Aghakhani	(Australia) Chad Reed	(United States) Steven Aghakhani	(Australia) Chad Reed	(Poland) Karol Basz (Poland) Andrzej Lewandoski	(Denmark) Frederik Schandorff (Monaco) Jonathan Cecotto	(Poland) Karol Basz (Poland) Andrzej Lewandoski	(Denmark) Frederik Schandorff (Monaco) Jonathan Cecotto	(Denmark) Frederik Schandorff	
2019	R2	(Spain) Circuito de Jerez	27 October	(United States) Steven Aghakhani	(United States) Ashton Harrison	(United States) Steven Aghakhani	(Australia) Chad Reed	(Poland) Karol Basz (Poland) Andrzej Lewandoski	(Italy) Andrea Amici (United Kingdom) Sandy Mitchell	(Poland) Karol Basz (Poland) Andrzej Lewandoski	(Denmark) Frederik Schandorff (Monaco) Jonathan Cecotto	(Denmark) Frederik Schandorff	
2020	R1	Cancelled due to the COVID-19 pandemic											
2020	R2	Cancelled due to the COVID-19 pandemic											
2021	R1	(Italy) Misano Circuit	30 October	(Italy) Massimo Ciglia	(United States) John Hennessy	(Puerto Rico) Victor Gomez	(United States) John Hennessy	(United States) Brandon Gdovic (Puerto Rico) Bryan Ortiz	(Poland) Karol Basz (Italy) Mattia Michelotto	(United States) Brandon Gdovic (Puerto Rico) Bryan Ortiz	(Poland) Karol Basz (Italy) Mattia Michelotto	(Poland) Karol Basz (Italy) Mattia Michelotto	
2021	R2	(Italy) Misano Circuit	30 October	(Puerto Rico) Victor Gomez	(United States) John Hennessy	(Puerto Rico) Victor Gomez	(United States) John Hennessy	(United Kingdom) Dan Wells (United States) Lee Oscar	(Poland) Karol Basz (Italy) Mattia Michelotto	(United States) Brandon Gdovic (Puerto Rico) Bryan Ortiz	(Poland) Karol Basz (Italy) Mattia Michelotto	(Poland) Karol Basz (Italy) Mattia Michelotto	
2022	R1	(Portugal) Portimao Circuit	5 November	(Poland) Andrzej Lewandowski	(United States) Slade Stewart	(Poland) Andrzej Lewandowski	(Belgium) Benoît Semoulin (Belgium) François Semoulin	(Puerto Rico) Bryan Ortiz (Puerto Rico) Sebastian Carazo	(Italy) Loris Spinelli (Netherlands) Max Weering	(Puerto Rico) Bryan Ortiz (Puerto Rico) Sebastian Carazo	(Brazil) Nelson Piquet Jr.	(Brazil) Nelson Piquet Jr.	
2022	R2	(Portugal) Portimao Circuit	5 November	(United States) Nikko Reger (United States) David Staab	(Belgium) Benoît Semoulin (Belgium) François Semoulin	(Poland) Andrzej Lewandowski	(Belgium) Benoît Semoulin (Belgium) François Semoulin	(United States) Bryson Lew (United States) John Dubets	(Brazil) Nelson Piquet Jr.	(Puerto Rico) Bryan Ortiz (Puerto Rico) Sebastian Carazo	(Brazil) Nelson Piquet Jr.	(Brazil) Nelson Piquet Jr.	
2023	R1	(Italy) Vallelunga Circuit	18 November	(United States) Anthony McIntosh (United States) Glenn McGee	(United States) Mark Wilgus	(United States) Anthony McIntosh (United States) Glenn McGee	(Kazakhstan) Shota Abkhazava	(Hong Kong) Alex Au (Denmark) Frederik Schandorff	(France) Amaury Bonduel	(Hong Kong) Alex Au (Denmark) Frederik Schandorff	(France) Amaury Bonduel	(France) Amaury Bonduel	
2023	R2	(Italy) Vallelunga Circuit	18 November	(France) Julien Piguet (France) Alban Varrutti	(United States) Graham Doyle	(United States) Anthony McIntosh (United States) Glenn McGee	(Kazakhstan) Shota Abkhazava	(Hong Kong) Alex Au (Denmark) Frederik Schandorff	(Italy) Federico Scionti (Italy) Luca Segù	(Hong Kong) Alex Au (Denmark) Frederik Schandorff	(France) Amaury Bonduel	(France) Amaury Bonduel	
2024	R1	(Spain) Circuit Ricardo Tormo	17 November	(Belgium) Renaud Kuppens	(Germany) Holger Harmsen	(Belgium) Renaud Kuppens	(Germany) Holger Harmsen	(United States) Anthony McIntosh (New Zealand) Brendon Leitch	(Sweden) Hampus Ericsson	(United States) Anthony McIntosh (New Zealand) Brendon Leitch	(Kazakhstan) Egor Orudzhev	(Kazakhstan) Egor Orudzhev	
2024	R2	(Spain) Circuit Ricardo Tormo	17 November	(United States) Anthony McIntosh (United States) Glenn McGee	(Germany) Holger Harmsen	(Belgium) Renaud Kuppens	(Germany) Holger Harmsen	(United States) Anthony McIntosh (New Zealand) Brendon Leitch	(Kazakhstan) Egor Orudzhev	(United States) Anthony McIntosh (New Zealand) Brendon Leitch	(Kazakhstan) Egor Orudzhev	(Kazakhstan) Egor Orudzhev	
2025	R1	(Italy) Misano Circuit	8 November	(Italy) Massimo Ciglia (Italy) Pietro Perolini	(Saudi Arabia) Karim Ojjeh	(Italy) Massimo Ciglia (Italy) Pietro Perolini	(Saudi Arabia) Karim Ojjeh	(Poland) Andrzej Lewandowski (Denmark) Frederik Schandorff	(New Zealand) Will Bamber (United States) Elias De La Torre IV	(Kazakhstan) Shota Abkhazava (Kazakhstan) Egor Orudzhev	(Sweden) Hampus Ericsson (Costa Rica) Danny Formal		
2025	R2	(Italy) Misano Circuit	9 November	(Italy) Massimo Ciglia (Italy) Pietro Perolini	(Saudi Arabia) Karim Ojjeh	(Italy) Massimo Ciglia (Italy) Pietro Perolini	(Saudi Arabia) Karim Ojjeh	(Kazakhstan) Shota Abkhazava (Kazakhstan) Egor Orudzhev	(Sweden) Hampus Ericsson (Costa Rica) Danny Formal	(Kazakhstan) Shota Abkhazava (Kazakhstan) Egor Orudzhev	(Sweden) Hampus Ericsson (Costa Rica) Danny Formal		
2026	R1	(Italy) Monza Circuit	21 October	(Poland) Andrzej Lewandowski	(United States) „Rocky“ Thomas Bolduc	(Poland) Andrzej Lewandowski	(United States) „Rocky“ Thomas Bolduc	(Czech Republic) Bronislav Formánek (South Africa) Anthony Pretorius	(Denmark) Dennis Lind (United States) Elias De La Torre IV	(Czech Republic) Bronislav Formánek (South Africa) Anthony Pretorius	(New Zealand) Brendon Leitch (Australia) Nicolas Stati	(New Zealand) Brendon Leitch (Australia) Nicolas Stati	
2026	R2	(Italy) Monza Circuit	21 October	(Poland) Andrzej Lewandowski	(United States) Christopher Koebbe	(Poland) Andrzej Lewandowski	(United States) „Rocky“ Thomas Bolduc	(New Zealand) Chris van der Drift (Australia) Todd Kingsford	(New Zealand) Brendon Leitch (Australia) Nicolas Stati	(Czech Republic) Bronislav Formánek (South Africa) Anthony Pretorius	(New Zealand) Brendon Leitch (Australia) Nicolas Stati	(New Zealand) Brendon Leitch (Australia) Nicolas Stati	
2027	R1	(Spain) Circuit de Barcelona-Catalunya	13 November										
2027	R2	(Spain) Circuit de Barcelona-Catalunya	13 November										

== See also ==
- Ferrari Challenge
- Mustang Challenge
- Porsche Supercup
- Audi R8 LMS Cup
- Trofeo Maserati
