= 2022 Lamborghini Super Trofeo Europe =

14th season of Lamborghini Suer Trofro Europe

The 2022 Lamborghini Super Trofeo Europe was the fourteenth season of the Lamborghini Super Trofeo Europe. The season began on 1 April at Imola and concluded on 6 November with the World Final at Portimão, featuring six rounds.

== Calendar ==
The preliminary calendar was released on 7 September 2021, featuring six rounds. In October 2021, the series promoters announced that Portimão would host the World Final.

Rnd.	Circuit	Date	Supporting
1	Imola Circuit, Imola, Italy	1–3 April	GT World Challenge Europe Endurance Cup
2	Circuit Paul Ricard, Le Castellet, France	3–5 June	GT World Challenge Europe Endurance Cup
3	Misano World Circuit Marco Simoncelli, Misano Adriatico, Italy	1–3 July	GT World Challenge Europe Sprint Cup
4	Circuit de Spa-Francorchamps, Stavelot, Belgium	28–30 July	GT World Challenge Europe Endurance Cup
5	Circuit de Barcelona-Catalunya, Montmeló, Spain	30 September–2 October	GT World Challenge Europe Endurance Cup
6	Algarve International Circuit, Portimão, Portugal	2–4 November	Lamborghini Super Trofeo World Final

== Series news ==
- 2022 marked the introduction of the Lamborghini Huracán Super Trofeo Evo2, the second evolution of the original Huracán Super Trofeo.

== Entry list ==
All teams use the Lamborghini Huracán Super Trofeo Evo2.

Team	No.	Drivers	Class	Rounds
(Belgium) Boutsen Ginion	2	(France) Elie Dubelly	Am	1
(Belgium) Boutsen Ginion	2	(France) Pierre Feligioni	Am	1
(Belgium) Boutsen Ginion	4	(France) Claude-Yves Gosselin	Am	1
(Belgium) Boutsen Ginion	4	(France) Marc Rostan	Am	1
(Belgium) Boutsen Ginion	12	(France) Regis Rego De Sebes	Am	1
(Belgium) Boutsen Ginion	12	(France) Daniel Waszczinski	Am	1
(Belgium) Boutsen Ginion	31	(Switzerland) François Grimm	Am	1
GT3 Poland	5	(Poland) Rafal Mikrut	Am	1
GT3 Poland	5	(Poland) Grzegorz Moczulski	Am	1
GT3 Poland	55	(Poland) Andrzej Lewandowski	Am	1
GT3 Poland	90	(Germany) Holger Harmsen	Am	1
(Italy) VS Racing	6	(Switzerland) Jean-Luc D'Auria	P	1
(Italy) VS Racing	6	(France) Stephane Tribaudini	P	1
(Italy) VS Racing	78	(San Marino) Emanuel Colombini	PA	1
(Italy) VS Racing	78	(San Marino) Emanuele Zonzini	PA	1
(China) Rexal FFF Racing Team	8	(France) Donovan Privitelio	LC	1
(China) Rexal FFF Racing Team	8	(Italy) Luciano Privitelio	LC	1
(China) Rexal FFF Racing Team	29	(Switzerland) Antonin Borga	PA	1
(China) Rexal FFF Racing Team	29	(Spain) Dani Pedrosa	PA	1
(China) Rexal FFF Racing Team	51	(United States) Oscar Lee	PA	1
(China) Rexal FFF Racing Team	51	(United Kingdom) Dan Wells	PA	1
(China) Rexal FFF Racing Team	72	(Malaysia) Kumar Parabakaran	LC	1
(Italy) Target Racing srl	9	(Fédération Internationale de l'Automobile) Dimitry Gvazava	PA	1
(Italy) Target Racing srl	9	(France) Milan Petelet	PA	1
(Italy) Target Racing srl	54	(Italy) Marzio Moretti	P	1
(Italy) Target Racing srl	54	(Netherlands) Milan Teekens	P	1
(Italy) Oregon Team	11	(Italy) Filippo Berto	P	1
(Italy) Oregon Team	11	(Italy) Alessandro Tarabini	P	1
(Italy) Oregon Team	14	(Italy) Enrico Bettera	PA	1
(Italy) Oregon Team	14	(Italy) Lorenzo Pegoraro	PA	1
(Italy) Oregon Team	27	(Italy) Massimo Ciglia	PA	1
(Italy) Oregon Team	27	(United Kingdom) Lewis Williamson	PA	1
(France) Arkadia Racing	13	(France) Stephan Guérin	Am	1
(Germany) Leipert Motorsport	18	(Romania) David Serban	P	1
(Germany) Leipert Motorsport	21	(Luxembourg) Gabriel Rindone	Am	1
(Germany) Leipert Motorsport	70	(New Zealand) Brendon Leitch	PA	1
(Germany) Leipert Motorsport	70	(United States) Gerhard Watzinger	PA	1
(Germany) Leipert Motorsport	87	(United States) Jean-Francois Brunot	PA	1
(Germany) Leipert Motorsport	87	(United States) Kerong Li	PA	1
(Germany) Leipert Motorsport	97	(Switzerland) Jürgen Krebs	Am	1
(Germany) Leipert Motorsport	97	(Switzerland) Tim Müller	Am	1
(Germany) AKF Motorsport	24	(Germany) Oliver Freymuth	Am	1
(Belgium) BDR Competition	28	(Belgium) Amaury Bonduel	P	1
(Italy) Bonaldi Motorsport	32	(Croatia) Sandro Mur	LC	1
(Italy) Bonaldi Motorsport	61	(Italy) Loris Spinelli	P	1
(Italy) Bonaldi Motorsport	61	(Netherlands) Max Weering	P	1
(Italy) Bonaldi Motorsport	91	(Italy) Paolo Biglieri	PA	1
(Italy) Bonaldi Motorsport	91	(Italy) Pietro Perolini	PA	1
(Italy) Lamborghini Roma Team	44	(Poland) Damian Ciosek	PA	1
(Italy) Lamborghini Roma Team	44	(Norway) Magnus Gustavsen	PA	1
(Switzerland) Autovitesse	63	(Switzerland) Cédric Leimer	Am	1
(Switzerland) Autovitesse	63	(Switzerland) Cyril Leimer	Am	1
(Czech Republic) Micanek Motorsport ACCR	44	(Czech Republic) Bronek Formanek	PA	1
(Czech Republic) Micanek Motorsport ACCR	44	(Czech Republic) Josef Zaruba	PA	1
(Italy) Imperiale Racing	88	(Netherlands) Hans Fabri	LC	1
(Italy) Imperiale Racing	89	(Spain) Manuel Bejarano	P	1
(Italy) Automobile Tricolore	96	(Italy) Raffaele Giannoni	Am	1
(Netherlands) Gerard Van Der Horst	98	(Netherlands) Gerard Van Der Horst	LC	1

Icon	Class
P	Pro Cup
PA	Pro-Am Cup
Am	Am Cup
LC	Lamborghini Cup

=== Notes ===
- Jose Hernandez was listed as a competitor driving the #77 car for BDR Competition but ultimately did not make the final entry list for the first race.
