= 2025 Lamborghini Super Trofeo Europe =

Sports car racing series season

The 2025 Lamborghini Super Trofeo Europe was the seventeenth season of the Lamborghini Super Trofeo Europe. The season began on 19 April at Imola, and finished on 15 November with the World Final at Jerez, featuring 6 rounds.

== Calendar ==
The calendar for the 2025 season was released on 13 October 2024, featuring six rounds, all but one on the GT World Challenge Europe Endurance Cup support bill. The location of the 12th Lamborghini Super Trofeo World Finals was revealed on 16 November 2024, as Lamborghini announced that they were holding the World Finals at Misano on 8–9 November, serving as the final races for the European, Asian and North American series.

Rnd.	Circuit	Date	Supporting
1	Circuit Paul Ricard, Le Castellet, France	11–13 April	GT World Challenge Europe Endurance Cup
2	Monza Circuit, Monza, Italy	30 May–1 June	GT World Challenge Europe Endurance Cup
3	Circuit de Spa-Francorchamps, Stavelot, Belgium	26–28 June	GT World Challenge Europe Endurance Cup
4	Nürburgring, Nürburg, Germany	29–31 August	GT World Challenge Europe Endurance Cup
5	Circuit de Barcelona-Catalunya, Montmeló, Spain	10–12 October	GT World Challenge Europe Endurance Cup
6	Misano World Circuit Marco Simoncelli, Misano Adriatico, Italy	6–7 November	Lamborghini Super Trofeo World Finals
WF	Misano World Circuit Marco Simoncelli, Misano Adriatico, Italy	8–9 November	Lamborghini Super Trofeo World Finals

== Teams and drivers ==
All teams used the Lamborghini Huracán Super Trofeo Evo2.

Team	No.	Drivers	Class	Rounds
(Belgium) Boutsen VDS	2	(France) Hugo Bac	PA	All
(Belgium) Boutsen VDS	2	(Belgium) Renaud Kuppens	PA	All
(Italy) Auto Sport Racing Service	3	(Poland) Andrzej Lewandowski	PA	2, 6
(Italy) Auto Sport Racing Service	3	(Denmark) Frederik Schandorff	PA	2, 6
(Italy) Auto Sport Racing Service	32	(Italy) Paolo Biglieri	Am	2–4, 6
(Italy) Auto Sport Racing Service	32	(Serbia) Petar Matić	Am	3
(Italy) Auto Sport Racing Service	32	(Finland) Henri Tuomaala	Am	4
(Italy) Auto Sport Racing Service	32	(Italy) Paolo Biglieri	LC	5
(Italy) Auto Sport Racing Service	32	(Croatia) Sandro Mur	LC	5
(Italy) Auto Sport Racing Service	33	(Serbia) Miloš Pavlović	PA	All
(Italy) Auto Sport Racing Service	33	(Italy) Alessio Ruffini	PA	All
(Italy) Rexal Villorba Corse	4	(Belgium) Claude-Yves Gosselin (Note: Gosselin is a French driver racing under a Belgian licence.)	LC	All
(Italy) Rexal Villorba Corse	7	(Saudi Arabia) Karim Ojjeh	LC	All
(Italy) Rexal Villorba Corse	8	(France) Donovan Privitelio	LC	All
(Italy) Rexal Villorba Corse	8	(San Marino) Luciano Privitelio	LC	All
(Italy) Rexal Villorba Corse	15	(Italy) Benedetto Strignano	P	All
(Italy) Rexal Villorba Corse	76	(Japan) Hiroshi Hamaguchi	Am	4
(Italy) Rexal Villorba Corse	76	(Japan) Mineki Okura	Am	4
GT3 Poland	5	(Poland) Adrian Lewandowski	Am	1–2, 5–6
GT3 Poland	55	(Poland) Andrzej Lewandowski	Am	3
GT3 Poland	79	(Poland) Seweryn Mazur	Am	1, 6
GT3 Poland	79	(Poland) Seweryn Mazur	PA	5
GT3 Poland	79	(Poland) Kevin Mirocha	PA	5
GT3 Poland	90	(Germany) Holger Harmsen	LC	All
(Italy) VSR	6	(Malaysia) Putera Adam	P	All
(Italy) VSR	6	(France) Paul Levet	P	1–3, 5–6
(Italy) VSR	6	(Italy) Riccardo Ianniello	P	4
(Italy) VSR	66	(Italy) Piergiacomo Randazzo	Am	All
(Italy) VSR	66	(France) Stéphane Tribaudini	Am	All
(Italy) Target Racing	9	(Italy) Patrik Fraboni	P	All
(Italy) Target Racing	9	(Italy) Giacomo Pedrini	P	All
(Italy) Target Racing	10	(Italy) Guido Luchetti	P	All
(Italy) Target Racing	96	(Italy) Raffaele Giannoni	Am	1–2
(United Arab Emirates) Micanek Motorsport powered by Buggyra	11	(Czech Republic) Bronislav Formánek	PA	4–6
(United Arab Emirates) Micanek Motorsport powered by Buggyra	11	(Slovakia) Štefan Rosina	PA	4–6
(Kazakhstan) ART-Line	12	(Kazakhstan) Shota Abkhazava	Am	1
(Kazakhstan) ART-Line	12	(Kazakhstan) Shota Abkhazava	PA	2–6
(Kazakhstan) ART-Line	12	(Kyrgyzstan) Egor Orudzhev (Note: Egor Orudzhev is a Russian driver competing under a Kyrgyz licence as Russian national emblems were banned by the FIA due to the Russian invasion of Ukraine.)	PA	2–6
(France) CMR	13	(France) Stéphan Guerin	PA	All
(France) CMR	13	(United Kingdom) Georgi Dimitrov (Note: Dimitrov is a British-Bulgarian driver racing under a British licence.)	PA	All
(France) CMR	27	(Belgium) Rodrigue Gillion	Am	All
(France) CMR	27	(Belgium) Stéphane Lémeret	Am	1–2, 4–6
(Italy) Oregon Team	14	(Brazil) Adalberto Baptista	LC	All
(Italy) Oregon Team	34	(Italy) Rosario Messina	P	All
(Italy) Oregon Team	34	(Poland) Gustaw Wiśniewski	P	All
(Italy) Oregon Team	36	(France) Enzo Geraci	P	All
(Italy) Oregon Team	36	(Czech Republic) Josef Knopp	P	All
(Italy) Oregon Team	61	(Italy) Massimo Ciglia	Am	All
(Italy) Oregon Team	61	(Italy) Pietro Perolini	Am	All
(Belgium) BDR Competition by Grupo Prom	17	(Belgium) Serge Doms	LC	All
(Belgium) BDR Competition by Grupo Prom	17	(Belgium) Nigel Bailly	LC	1–4
(Belgium) BDR Competition by Grupo Prom	57	(Belgium) Kai Rillaerts	P	1–4
(Belgium) BDR Competition by Grupo Prom	57	(France) Lucas Valkre	P	1
(Belgium) BDR Competition by Grupo Prom	57	(Italy) Kikko Galbiati	P	2, 4
(Belgium) BDR Competition by Grupo Prom	57	(France) Amaury Bonduel (Note: Bonduel is a Belgian driver racing under a French licence.)	P	3, 5–6
(Belgium) BDR Competition by Grupo Prom	57	(Germany) Sebastian Balthasar	P	5
(Belgium) BDR Competition by Grupo Prom	57	(Italy) Andrea Fontana	P	6
(Belgium) BDR Competition by Grupo Prom	74	(France) Anthony Nahra	PA	All
(Belgium) BDR Competition by Grupo Prom	74	(France) Dimitri Enjalbert	PA	All
(Belgium) BDR Competition by Grupo Prom	77	(Mexico) Alfredo Hernández Ortega	Am	All
(Italy) DL Racing	18	(Vietnam) Chan Chi Chung (Note: Chan is a Hong Kong driver competing under a Vietnamese licence.)	Am	1
(Italy) DL Racing	18	(Hong Kong) Tse Ka Hing	Am	1
(Italy) DL Racing	18	(Vietnam) Chan Chi Chung	LC	2–6
(Italy) DL Racing	18	(Hong Kong) Tse Ka Hing	LC	2–6
(Italy) DL Racing	23	(Italy) Francesco Turzo	LC	All
(Italy) DL Racing	38	(Hong Kong) Philip Tang	LC	All
(Italy) DL Racing	41	(Italy) Cristian Bortolato	LC	2–3, 5–6
(Italy) DL Racing	72	(Italy) Diego Locanto	PA	2, 4, 6
(Italy) DL Racing	72	(Italy) Luca Segù	PA	2, 4, 6
(Poland) UNIQ Racing	25	(Poland) Jerzy Spinkiewicz	P	1–4
(Germany) Leipert Motorsport	44	(Sweden) Calle Bergman	P	All
(Germany) Leipert Motorsport	44	(Sweden) Månz Thalin	P	All
(Germany) Leipert Motorsport	56	(Canada) Fred Roberts	LC	5–6
(Germany) Leipert Motorsport	56	(United States) Jeff Courtney	LC	5–6
(Germany) Leipert Motorsport	70	(United States) Gerhard Watzinger	LC	1–4
(Germany) Leipert Motorsport	70	(Singapore) Ethan Brown	P	5
(Germany) Leipert Motorsport	70	(United States) Elias de la Torre	P	5
(Germany) Leipert Motorsport	70	(New Zealand) Brendon Leitch	P	6
(Germany) Leipert Motorsport	70	(Australia) Nicolas Stati	P	6
(Germany) Leipert Motorsport	88	(Germany) Pablo Schumm	P	1–4
(Germany) Leipert Motorsport	88	(France) Lola Lovinfosse	P	1
(Germany) Leipert Motorsport	99	(Denmark) Silas Loven Rytter	P	All
(Germany) Leipert Motorsport	99	(South Africa) Anthony Pretorius	P	All
(Italy) CRM Motorsport	53	(Italy) Ettore Carminati	PA	2
(Italy) CRM Motorsport	53	(Italy) Bernardo Pellegrini	PA	2
(Switzerland) Autovitesse	63	(Switzerland) Laurent Jenny	Am	2
(Switzerland) Autovitesse	63	(Switzerland) Cédric Leimer	Am	2
(Italy) SF Squadra Corse By SC Motorsport	68	(Italy) Matteo Desideri	P	2
(Italy) SF Squadra Corse By SC Motorsport	68	(Italy) Andrea Fontana	P	2
(Italy) Giacomo Race	71	(Italy) Giacomo Pollini	P	2
(Italy) Giacomo Race	71	(Italy) Matteo Pollini	P	2
Entrylists:

Icon	Class
P	Pro Cup
PA	Pro-Am Cup
Am	Am Cup
LC	Lamborghini Cup

== Race results ==
Bold indicates the overall winner.

Round		Circuit	Pole position	Pro winners	Pro-Am winners	Am winners	LC Winners
1	R1	(France) Circuit Paul Ricard	(Italy) #10 Target Racing	(Italy) #9 Target Racing	**(France) #13 CMR**	#5 GT3 Poland	(Italy) #7 Rexal Villorba Corse
1	R1	(France) Circuit Paul Ricard	**(Italy) Guido Luchetti**	(Italy) Patrik Fraboni (Italy) Giacomo Pedrini	**(France) Stéphan Guerin** **(United Kingdom) Georgi Dimitrov**	(Poland) Adrian Lewandowski	(Saudi Arabia) Karim Ojjeh
1	R2	(France) Circuit Paul Ricard	(Italy) #33 Auto Sport Racing Service	**(Italy) #36 Oregon Team**	(France) #13 CMR	(Italy) #66 VSR	(Italy) #14 Oregon Team
1	R2	(France) Circuit Paul Ricard	**(Serbia) Miloš Pavlović** (Italy) Alessio Ruffini	**(France) Enzo Geraci** **(Czech Republic) Josef Knopp**	(France) Stéphan Guerin (United Kingdom) Georgi Dimitrov	(Italy) Piergiacomo Randazzo (France) Stéphane Tribaudini	(Brazil) Adalberto Baptista
2	R1	(Italy) Monza Circuit	(Italy) #6 VSR	(Italy) #36 Oregon Team	**(France) #13 CMR**	(Italy) #66 VSR	#90 GT3 Poland
2	R1	(Italy) Monza Circuit	**(France) Paul Levet** (Malaysia) Putera Adam	(France) Enzo Geraci (Czech Republic) Josef Knopp	**(France) Stéphan Guerin** **(United Kingdom) Georgi Dimitrov**	(Italy) Piergiacomo Randazzo (France) Stéphane Tribaudini	(Germany) Holger Harmsen
2	R2	(Italy) Monza Circuit	(Germany) #44 Leipert Motorsport	**(Italy) #6 VSR**	(France) #13 CMR	(Italy) #66 VSR	(Italy) #7 Rexal Villorba Corse
2	R2	(Italy) Monza Circuit	**(Sweden) Calle Bergman** (Sweden) Månz Thalin	**(France) Paul Levet** **(Malaysia) Putera Adam**	(France) Stéphan Guerin (United Kingdom) Georgi Dimitrov	(Italy) Piergiacomo Randazzo (France) Stéphane Tribaudini	(Saudi Arabia) Karim Ojjeh
3	R1	(Belgium) Circuit de Spa-Francorchamps	(Belgium) #57 BDR Competition by Grupo Prom	**(Poland) #25 UNIQ Racing**	(Italy) #33 Auto Sport Racing Service	(Italy) #66 VSR	(Italy) #7 Rexal Villorba Corse
3	R1	(Belgium) Circuit de Spa-Francorchamps	(Belgium) Kai Rillaerts **(Belgium) Amaury Bonduel**	**(Poland) Jerzy Spinkiewicz**	(Serbia) Miloš Pavlović (Italy) Alessio Ruffini	(Italy) Piergiacomo Randazzo (France) Stéphane Tribaudini	(Saudi Arabia) Karim Ojjeh
3	R2	(Belgium) Circuit de Spa-Francorchamps	(Kazakhstan) #12 ART-Line	**(Germany) #99 Leipert Motorsport**	(France) #13 CMR	(Italy) #32 Auto Sport Racing Service	(Germany) #70 Leipert Motorsport
3	R2	(Belgium) Circuit de Spa-Francorchamps	(Kazakhstan) Shota Abkhazava **(Kyrgyzstan) Egor Orudzhev**	**(South Africa) Anthony Pretorius** **(Denmark) Silas Loven Rytter**	(France) Stéphan Guerin (United Kingdom) Georgi Dimitrov	(Italy) Paolo Biglieri	(United States) Gerhard Watzinger
4	R1	(Germany) Nürburgring	(France) #13 CMR	**(Italy) #19 Target Racing**	(United Arab Emirates) #11 Micanek Motorsport powered by Buggyra	(Italy) #61 Oregon Team	(Italy) #7 Rexal Villorba Corse
4	R1	(Germany) Nürburgring	(France) Stéphan Guerin **(United Kingdom) Georgi Dimitrov**	**(Italy) Guido Luchetti**	(Czech Republic) Bronislav Formánek (Slovakia) Štefan Rosina	(Italy) Massimo Ciglia (Italy) Pietro Perolini	(Saudi Arabia) Karim Ojjeh
4	R2	(Germany) Nürburgring	(Kazakhstan) #12 ART-Line	**(Italy) #9 Target Racing**	(Belgium) #2 Boutsen VDS	(Italy) #61 Oregon Team	(Italy) #7 Rexal Villorba Corse
4	R2	(Germany) Nürburgring	(Kazakhstan) Shota Abkhazava **(Kyrgyzstan) Egor Orudzhev**	**(Italy) Patrik Fraboni** **(Italy) Giacomo Pedrini**	(France) Hugo Bac (Belgium) Renaud Kuppens	(Italy) Massimo Ciglia (Italy) Pietro Perolini	(Saudi Arabia) Karim Ojjeh
5	R1	(Spain) Circuit de Barcelona-Catalunya	(Italy) #36 Oregon Team	**(Italy) #6 VSR**	(United Arab Emirates) #11 Micanek Motorsport powered by Buggyra	(Italy) #61 Oregon Team	(Italy) #7 Rexal Villorba Corse
5	R1	(Spain) Circuit de Barcelona-Catalunya	**(France) Enzo Geraci** (Czech Republic) Josef Knopp	**(France) Paul Levet** **(Malaysia) Putera Adam**	(Czech Republic) Bronislav Formánek (Slovakia) Štefan Rosina	(Italy) Massimo Ciglia (Italy) Pietro Perolini	(Saudi Arabia) Karim Ojjeh
5	R2	(Spain) Circuit de Barcelona-Catalunya	(Italy) #15 Rexal Villorba Corse	**(Italy) #6 VSR**	(France) #13 CMR	(France) #27 CMR	(Italy) #7 Rexal Villorba Corse
5	R2	(Spain) Circuit de Barcelona-Catalunya	**(Italy) Benedetto Strignano**	**(France) Paul Levet** **(Malaysia) Putera Adam**	(France) Stéphan Guerin (United Kingdom) Georgi Dimitrov	(Belgium) Rodrigue Gillion (Belgium) Stéphane Lémeret	(Saudi Arabia) Karim Ojjeh
6	R1	(Italy) Misano World Circuit Marco Simoncelli	(Italy) #36 Oregon Team	**(Germany) #70 Leipert Motorsport**	(Italy) #3 Auto Sport Racing Service	(Italy) #61 Oregon Team	(Italy) #8 Rexal Villorba Corse
6	R1	(Italy) Misano World Circuit Marco Simoncelli	**(France) Enzo Geraci** (Czech Republic) Josef Knopp	**(New Zealand) Brendon Leitch** **(Australia) Nicolas Stati**	(Poland) Andrzej Lewandowski (Denmark) Frederik Schandorff	(Italy) Massimo Ciglia (Italy) Pietro Perolini	(San Marino) Luciano Privitelio (France) Donovan Privitelio
6	R2	(Italy) Misano World Circuit Marco Simoncelli	(Germany) #70 Leipert Motorsport	**(Germany) #70 Leipert Motorsport**	(Italy) #3 Auto Sport Racing Service	(Italy) #66 VSR	(Italy) #7 Rexal Villorba Corse
6	R2	(Italy) Misano World Circuit Marco Simoncelli	**(New Zealand) Brendon Leitch** (Australia) Nicolas Stati	**(New Zealand) Brendon Leitch** **(Australia) Nicolas Stati**	(Poland) Andrzej Lewandowski (Denmark) Frederik Schandorff	(Italy) Piergiacomo Randazzo (France) Stéphane Tribaudini	(Saudi Arabia) Karim Ojjeh
WF	R1	(Italy) Misano World Circuit Marco Simoncelli	(United States) #101 Wayne Taylor Racing	**(United States) #129 TR3 Racing**	(Kazakhstan) #12 ART-Line	(Italy) #61 Oregon Team	(Italy) #7 Rexal Villorba Corse
WF	R1	(Italy) Misano World Circuit Marco Simoncelli	(Sweden) Hampus Ericsson **(Costa Rica) Danny Formal**	**(New Zealand) Will Bamber** **(United States) Elias de la Torre**	(Kazakhstan) Shota Abkhazava (Kyrgyzstan) Egor Orudzhev	(Italy) Massimo Ciglia (Italy) Pietro Perolini	(Saudi Arabia) Karim Ojjeh
WF	R2	(Italy) Misano World Circuit Marco Simoncelli	(Italy) #3 Auto Sport Racing Service	**(United States) #101 Wayne Taylor Racing**	(Italy) #3 Auto Sport Racing Service	(Italy) #61 Oregon Team	(Italy) #7 Rexal Villorba Corse
WF	R2	(Italy) Misano World Circuit Marco Simoncelli	(Poland) Andrzej Lewandowski **(Denmark) Frederik Schandorff**	**(Sweden) Hampus Ericsson** **(Costa Rica) Danny Formal**	(Poland) Andrzej Lewandowski (Denmark) Frederik Schandorff	(Italy) Massimo Ciglia (Italy) Pietro Perolini	(Saudi Arabia) Karim Ojjeh
Results:

== Championship standings ==
=== Scoring system ===
Position	1st	2nd	3rd	4th	5th	6th	7th	8th	9th	10th	Pole
Points	15	12	10	8	6	5	4	3	2	1	1

=== Pro ===
Pos.	Driver	Team	(France) LEC		(Italy) MNZ		(Belgium) SPA		(Germany) NUR		(Spain) BAR		(Italy) MIS		Points
1	(Malaysia) Putera Adam	(Italy) VSR	6	Ret	6	1	2	2	4	5	1	1	2	7	114
2	(France) Enzo Geraci (Czech Republic) Josef Knopp	(Italy) Oregon Team	4	1	1	3	5	4	2	3	5	8	7	6	109
3	(Italy) Patrik Fraboni (Italy) Giacomo Pedrini	(Italy) Target Racing	1	6	8	4	3	7	6	1	Ret	2	4	2	102
4	(France) Paul Levet	(Italy) VSR	6	Ret	6	1	2	2			1	1	2	7	100
5	(Italy) Guido Luchetti	(Italy) Target Racing	Ret	2	9	2	7	3	1	2	6	9	8	3	95
6	(South Africa) Anthony Pretorius (Denmark) Silas Loven Rytter	(Germany) Leipert Motorsport	2	6	Ret	6	4	1	11	4	9	5	5	5	81
7	(Italy) Benedetto Strignano	(Italy) Rexal Villorba Corse	5	3	5	7	WD	WD	3	7	2	7	6	4	75
8	(Poland) Jerzy Spinkiewicz	(Poland) UNIQ Racing	3	4	3	Ret	1	5	5	6					60
9	(Italy) Rosario Messina (Poland) Gustaw Wiśniewski	(Italy) Oregon Team	8	8	7	5	8	6	9	8	8	4	9	8	50
10	(Sweden) Calle Bergman (Sweden) Månz Thalin	(Germany) Leipert Motorsport	7	5	4	8	Ret	WD	7	9	7	6	Ret	9	42
11	(Italy) Andrea Fontana	(Italy) SF Squadra Corse By SC Motorsport			2	9									28
11	(Italy) Andrea Fontana	(Belgium) BDR Competition											3	10	28
12	(Belgium) Amaury Bonduel	(Belgium) BDR Competition					Ret	WD			3	10	3	10	27
13	(Italy) Matteo Desideri	(Italy) SF Squadra Corse By SC Motorsport			2	9									14
14	(Italy) Riccardo Ianniello	(Italy) VSR							4	5					14
15	(Germany) Pablo Schumm	(Germany) Leipert Motorsport	Ret	10	10	11	6	Ret	10	Ret					8
16	(Belgium) Kai Rillaerts	(Belgium) BDR Competition	Ret	9	WD	WD	Ret	WD	8	Ret					6
17	(Italy) Kikko Galbiati	(Belgium) BDR Competition			WD	WD			8	Ret					3
18	(France) Lucas Valkre	(Belgium) BDR Competition	Ret	9											2
19	(Italy) Matteo Pollini (Italy) Giacomo Pollini	(Italy) Giacomo Race			Ret	10									1
20	(France) Lola Lovinfosse	(Germany) Leipert Motorsport	Ret	10											1
Guest drivers ineligible to score points
–	(Australia) Nicolas Stati (New Zealand) Brendon Leitch	(Germany) Leipert Motorsport											1	1	–
–	(Singapore) Ethan Brown (United States) Elias de la Torre	(Germany) Leipert Motorsport									4	3			–
–	(Germany) Sebastian Balthasar	(Belgium) BDR Competition									3	10			–
Pos.	Driver	Team	(France) LEC		(Italy) MNZ		(Belgium) SPA		(Germany) NUR		(Spain) BAR		(Italy) MIS		Points

=== Pro-Am ===
Pos.	Driver	Team	(France) LEC		(Italy) MNZ		(Belgium) SPA		(Germany) NUR		(Spain) BAR		(Italy) MIS		Points
1	(France) Stéphan Guerin (United Kingdom) Georgi Dimitrov	(France) CMR	1	1	1	1	2	1	7	3	4	1	4	2	148
2	(Serbia) Miloš Pavlović (Italy) Alessio Ruffini	(Italy) Auto Sport Racing Service	2	4	6	Ret	1	4	4	6	6	2	7	7	92
3	(France) Dimitri Enjalbert (France) Anthony Nahra	(Belgium) BDR Competition	3	2	4	3	Ret	3	5	4	3	Ret	3	4	91
4	(France) Hugo Bac (Belgium) Renaud Kuppens	(Belgium) Boutsen VDS	4	3	5	6	3	Ret	3	1	2	4	Ret	3	84
5	(Kazakhstan) Shota Abkhazava (Kyrgyzstan) Egor Orudzhev	(Kazakhstan) ART-Line			Ret	4	Ret	2	2	2	5	5	2	8	74
6	(Czech Republic) Bronislav Formánek (Slovakia) Štefan Rosina	(United Arab Emirates) Micanek Motorsport powered by Buggyra							1	5	1	3	5	5	62
7	(Poland) Andrzej Lewandowski (Denmark) Frederik Schandorff	(Italy) Auto Sport Racing Service			3	2							1	1	53
8	(Italy) Diego Locanto (Italy) Luca Segù	(Italy) DL Racing			2	5			6	DNS			6	6	35
9	(Poland) Seweryn Mazur	GT3 Poland									7	Ret			4
10	(Italy) Ettore Carminati (Italy) Bernardo Pellegrini	(Italy) CRM Motorsport			Ret	7									4
Guest drivers ineligible to score points
–	(Poland) Kevin Mirocha	GT3 Poland									7	Ret			–
Pos.	Driver	Team	(France) LEC		(Italy) MNZ		(Belgium) SPA		(Germany) NUR		(Spain) BAR		(Italy) MIS		Points

=== Am ===
Pos.	Driver	Team	(France) LEC		(Italy) MNZ		(Belgium) SPA		(Germany) NUR		(Spain) BAR		(Italy) MIS		Points
1	(Italy) Massimo Ciglia (Italy) Pietro Perolini	(Italy) Oregon Team	5	6	2	2	4	2	1	1	1	4	1	2	135
2	(Italy) Piergiacomo Randazzo (France) Stéphane Tribaudini	(Italy) VSR	Ret	1	1	1	1	5	2	5	3	2	4	1	134
3	(Belgium) Rodrigue Gillion	(France) CMR	7	5	4	Ret	5	3	3	4	4	1	6	6	89
4	(Poland) Adrian Lewandowski	GT3 Poland	1	2	7	3					2	Ret	3	3	75
5	(Belgium) Stéphane Lémeret	(France) CMR	7	5	4	Ret			3	4	4	1	6	6	73
6	(Italy) Paolo Biglieri	(Italy) Auto Sport Racing Service			3	6	3	1	6	2			5	5	69
7	(Mexico) Alfredo Hernandez Ortega	(Belgium) BDR Competition	4	8	6	5	Ret	4	5	6	Ret	3	7	7	59
8	(Poland) Seweryn Mazur	GT3 Poland	8	4									2	4	31
9	(Italy) Raffaele Giannoni	(Italy) Target Racing	3	7	8	4									25
10	(Kazakhstan) Shota Abkhazava	(Kazakhstan) ART-Line	2	3											22
11	(Japan) Hiroshi Hamaguchi (Japan) Mineki Okura	(Italy) Rexal Villorba Corse							4	3					18
12	(Finland) Henri Tuomaala	(Italy) Auto Sport Racing Service							6	2					17
13	(Poland) Andrzej Lewandowski	GT3 Poland					2	DSQ							13
14	(Vietnam) Chan Chi Chung (Hong Kong) Tse Ka Hing	(Italy) DL Racing	6	9											7
15	(Switzerland) Laurent Jenny (Switzerland) Cédric Leimer	(Switzerland) Autovitesse			5	Ret									6
Guest drivers ineligible to score points
–	(Serbia) Petar Matić	(Italy) Auto Sport Racing Service					WD	WD							–
Pos.	Driver	Team	(France) LEC		(Italy) MNZ		(Belgium) SPA		(Germany) NUR		(Spain) BAR		(Italy) MIS		Points

=== Lamborghini Cup ===
Pos.	Driver	Team	(France) LEC		(Italy) MNZ		(Belgium) SPA		(Germany) NUR		(Spain) BAR		(Italy) MIS		Points
1	(Saudi Arabia) Karim Ojjeh	(Italy) Rexal Villorba Corse	1	9	DSQ	1	1	Ret	1	1	1	1	2	1	142
2	(France) Donovan Privitelio (San Marino) Luciano Privitelio	(Italy) Rexal Villorba Corse	3	6	2	7	2	6	4	7	6	4	1	3	98
3	(Germany) Holger Harmsen	GT3 Poland	5	2	1	Ret	4	3	7	4	7	2	7	2	97
4	(Belgium) Claude-Yves Gosselin	(Italy) Rexal Villorba Corse	2	5	3	3	7	8	2	3	2	8	Ret	DNS	83
5	(Brazil) Adalberto Baptista	(Italy) Oregon Team	Ret	1	Ret	2	6	2	3	9	3	10	4	9	79
6	(Italy) Francesco Turzo	(Italy) DL Racing	6	7	4	Ret	8	9	6	6	5	3	3	5	68
7	(Vietnam) Chan Chi Chung (Hong Kong) Ka Hing Tse	(Italy) DL Racing			8	4	5	4	8	5	8	6	6	6	55
8	(United States) Gerhard Watzinger	(Germany) Leipert Motorsport	4	3	6	DNS	3	1	Ret	Ret					50
9	(Belgium) Serge Doms	(Belgium) BDR Competition	7	4	7	5	11	5	9	8	10	11	8	7	45
10	(Hong Kong) Philip Tang	(Italy) DL Racing	Ret	8	5	8	9	Ret	5	2	11	9	Ret	8	40
11	(Belgium) Nigel Bailly	(Belgium) BDR Competition	7	4	7	5	11	5	9	8					33
12	(Italy) Paolo Biglieri	(Italy) Auto Sport Racing Service									9	4			12
13	(Italy) Cristian Bortolato	(Italy) DL Racing			Ret	6	10	7			Ret	Ret	Ret	Ret	10
Guest drivers ineligible to score points
–	(Canada) Fred Roberts (United States) Jeff Courtney	(Germany) Leipert Motorsport									4	7	5	4	–
–	(Croatia) Sandro Mur	(Italy) Auto Sport Racing Service									9	4			–
Pos.	Driver	Team	(France) LEC		(Italy) MNZ		(Belgium) SPA		(Germany) NUR		(Spain) BAR		(Italy) MIS		Points

=== Teams ===
Pos.	Team	Points
1	(Italy) Target Racing	136
=2	(Italy) VSR	115
=2	(Italy) Oregon Team	115
3	(Germany) Leipert Motorsport	101
4	(Italy) Rexal Villorba Corse	77
5	(Poland) UNIQ Racing	61
6	(Belgium) BDR Competition by Grupo Prom	38
7	(Italy) SF Squadra Corse By SC Motorsport	17
8	(Italy) Giacomo Race	4
