= Brendon Leitch =

New Zealand motor racing driver

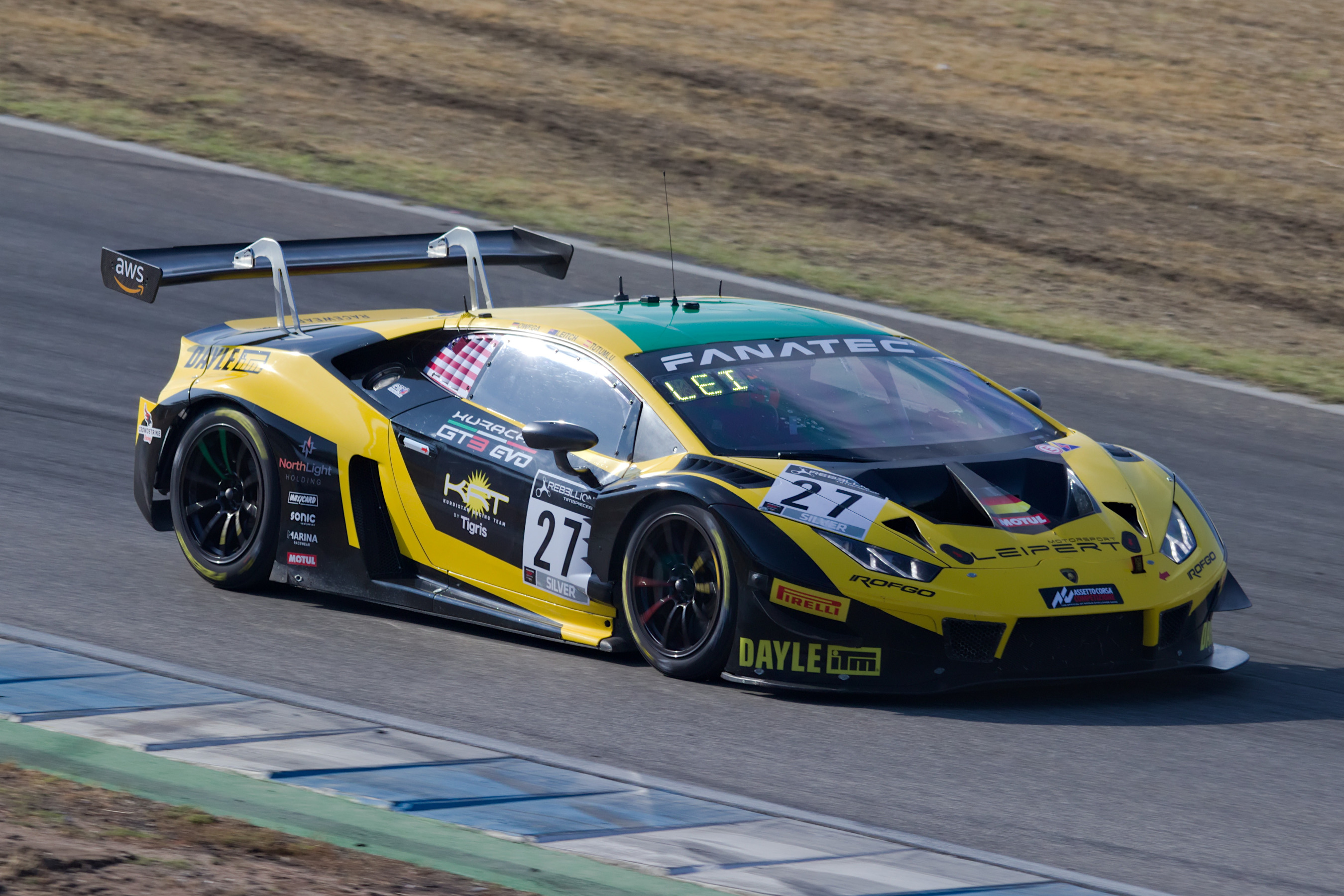
- Nationality: (New Zealand) New Zealander
- Born: Brendon Alistair Leitch; 28 November 1995 (age 30) Invercargill, New Zealand
- Relatives: Damon Leitch (brother)

Toyota Racing Series career
- Debut season: 2014
- Current team: Toyota Racing
- Categorisation: FIA Silver (until 2024); FIA Gold (2025–)
- Car number: 86
- Former teams: Victory Motor Racing
- Starts: 94
- Wins: 6
- Poles: 2
- Fastest laps: 4
- Best finish: 3rd in 2016

Previous series
- 2017 2010-2013 2009-10: Formula 4 United States Championship; New Zealand Formula Ford Championship; South Island Formula Ford Championship

Championship titles
- 2023: Lamborghini Super Trofeo Europe - Pro

Brendon Alistair Leitch (born 28 November 1995) is a New Zealand motor racing driver.

== Career ==
Leitch began car racing in the Formula Ford category in 2009, racing in the South Island Formula Ford Championship. The following year, he would contend the New Zealand Formula Ford Championship, with modest results. The following two years would be more successful for Leitch, finishing third in the 2011-12 championship, and second the following season.

Following these strong performances, Leitch would contend the Toyota Racing Series for the 2014 season, joining brother Damon. Leitch's most successful season to date would be the 2016 season, where he scored one win, three podiums and third overall in the driver standings. Following this, Leitch secured a drive in the Formula 4 United States Championship for 2017. After a strong campaign, Leitch returned to New Zealand and would contend his fifth consecutive season in the Toyota Racing Series.

In December 2018, it was announced that Leitch would contend his sixth season in the Toyota Racing Series with Victory Motor Racing.

== Racing record ==
=== Karting career summary ===
Season	Series	Position
2005	New Zealand Sprint Kart Championship - Cadet	13th
2009	Christchurch Garden City Kart Championship - Formula Junior	4th
2009	Christchurch Garden City Kart Championship - 100cc Junior Yamaha	6th
2011	New Zealand Sprint Kart Championship - 100cc Junior Yamaha	24th

=== Career summary ===
Season	Series	Team	Races	Wins	Poles	F. Laps	Podiums	Points	Position
2009–10	South Island Formula Ford Championship		4	0	0	0	0	0	-
2010–11	New Zealand Formula Ford Championship		18	0	0	0	0	576	9th
2011–12	New Zealand Formula Ford Championship		15	0	0	0	3	796	**3rd**
2013	New Zealand Formula Ford Championship		15	3	1	2	14	987	**2nd**
2014	Toyota Racing Series	Victory Motor Racing	15	0	0	0	0	366	16th
2015	Toyota Racing Series	Victory Motor Racing	16	1	1	0	1	477	14th
2016	Toyota Racing Series	Victory Motor Racing	15	1	0	0	3	754	**3rd**
2017	Toyota Racing Series	Victory Motor Racing	15	1	1	1	2	502	9th
2017	Formula 4 United States Championship	Kiwi Motorsport	20	1	1	1	3	114	8th
2018	Toyota Racing Series	Victory Motor Racing	15	2	0	2	2	634	7th
2019	F3 Asian Championship	BlackArts Racing Team	15	0	0	1	5	152	4th
2019	Toyota Racing Series	Victory Motor Racing	15	1	0	1	3	245	6th
2019	Lamborghini Super Trofeo Asia - Pro-Am	Leipert Motorsport	12	2	3	1	8	111	**2nd**
2019	Lamborghini Super World Final - Pro-Am	Leipert Motorsport	2	0	0	0	0	1	5th
2021	Toyota Racing Series	Kiwi Motorsport	3	0	0	0	0	44	12th
2021	International GT Open	Leipert Motorsport	2	0	0	0	0	4	29th
2021	24H GT Series - GT3 Pro	Leipert Motorsport	3	3	2	1	3	26	**1st**
2022	Lamborghini Super Trofeo Europe - Pro-Am	Leipert Motorsport	12	0	3	4	2	?	?
2022	GT World Challenge Europe Endurance Cup	Leipert Motorsport	5	0	0	0	0	0	NC
2022	24H GT Series - GT3	Leipert Motorsport	1	0	0	0	0	0	N/A
2023	Lamborghini Super Trofeo Europe - Pro	Leipert Motorsport	12	2	0	0	9	127	**1st**
2023	Lamborghini Super Trofeo World Final - Pro	Leipert Motorsport	2	0	0	0	1	18	**3rd**
2023	Le Mans Cup - GT3	Leipert Motorsport	6	0	0	0	0	21	13th
2023	Asian Le Mans Series - GT	Leipert Motorsport	4	0	0	1	2	31	5th
2023	GT World Challenge Europe Endurance Cup - Silver Cup	Leipert Motorsport	1	0	0	0	0	6	18th
2023	GT World Challenge Europe Endurance Cup	Leipert Motorsport	1	0	0	0	0	0	NC
2023	GT World Challenge Europe Endurance Cup	CrowdStrike Racing by Leipert Motorsport	1	0	0	0	0	0	NC
2023	GT World Challenge Europe Endurance Cup - Pro-Am Cup	CrowdStrike Racing by Leipert Motorsport	1	0	0	0	0	1	22nd
2023	Formula Regional Oceania Championship	Kiwi Motorsport	3	0	0	0	0	44	18th
2023–24	Asian Le Mans Series - GT	Leipert Motorsport	5	0	0	0	1	34	7th
2023–24	Middle East Trophy - GT3	Leipert Motorsport							
2023–24	Middle East Trophy - GTX	Leipert Motorsport							
2024	GT World Challenge Australia - Pro-Am	Dayle ITM Team MPC	10	1	0	1	4	112	6th
2024	GT World Challenge Europe Endurance Cup	Earl Bamber Motorsport	1	0	0	0	0	0	NC
2024	International GT Open	Earl Bamber Motorsport	1	0	0	0	0	0	69th
2024	GT World Challenge America - Pro-Am	Earl Bamber Motorsport	1	0	0	0	0	0	NC†
2024	Lamborghini Super Trofeo World Final - Pro Am	Leipert Motorsport	2	2	0	0	2	30	**1st**
2024	IMSA SportsCar Championship - GTD	MDK Motorsports	1	0	0	0	0	210	62nd
2024	Lamborghini Super Trofeo Europe	Leipert Motorsport	4	2	1	0	3	-	N/A
2024–25	Asian Le Mans Series - GT	Earl Bamber Motorsport	4	0	0	1	0	0	25th
2025	Middle East Trophy - GTX	Leipert Motorsport	1	1	1	1	1	-	N/A
2025	Lamborghini Super Trofeo Asia - Pro-Am	Leipert Motorsport	8	0	3	3	3	68	6th
2025	Lamborghini Super Trofeo Europe - Pro	Leipert Motorsport	2	2	1	2	2	0	NC†
2025	GT World Challenge Australia - Pro-Am	Dayle ITM Team MPC	6	0	0	0	2	53	11th
2025	Lamborghini Super Trofeo North America – Pro-Am	Wayne Taylor Racing	5	2	3	0	2	39	10th
2025	Italian GT Championship Endurance Cup - GT3	BMW Italia Ceccato Racing	1	0	0	1	1	23	NC†
2025	Gulf 12 Hours - Pro-Am	Geyer Valmont Racing/Tigani Motors	1	1	1	0	1	N/A	**1st**
2025–26	24H Series Middle East - GT3	Leipert Motorsport	1	0	0	0	0	0	NC†
2025–26	24H Series Middle East - GTX	Leipert Motorsport	1	1	1	1	1	0	NC†
2026	GT World Challenge Australia - Pro-Am	Geyer Valmont Racing by Tigani Motorsport							
2026	GT World Challenge Asia	Harmony Racing	4	0	0	0	0	18	27th
2026	GT World Challenge Asia	Apex Predator Harmony Racing	8	0	0	0	0	18	27th
2026	Lamborghini Super Trofeo Europe - Pro	Leipert Motorsport	2	1	0	1	2	27	9th
2026	Lamborghini Super Trofeo Europe - Pro-Am	Leipert Motorsport	2	0	0	0	2	22	9th
2026	International GT Open	Leipert Motorsport	1	0	0	0	0	0	74th
2026–27	Asian Le Mans Series – GT3	Leipert Motorsport						*	*

^{†} As Leitch was a guest driver, he was ineligible to score points. ^{*} Season still in progress.

=== Complete New Zealand Grand Prix results ===
Year	Team	Car	Qualifying	Main race
2014	(New Zealand) Victory Motor Racing	Tatuus FT-50 - Toyota	21st	11th
2015	(New Zealand) Victory Motor Racing	Tatuus FT-50 - Toyota	14th	16th
2016	(New Zealand) Victory Motor Racing	Tatuus FT-50 - Toyota	13th	10th
2017	(New Zealand) Victory Motor Racing	Tatuus FT-50 - Toyota	10th	8th
2018	(New Zealand) Victory Motor Racing	Tatuus FT-50 - Toyota	7th	5th
2019	(New Zealand) Victory Motor Racing	Tatuus FT-50 - Toyota	4th	6th
2021	(New Zealand) Kiwi Motorsport	Tatuus FT-60 - Toyota	12th	7th
2023	(New Zealand) Kiwi Motorsport	Tatuus FT-60 - Toyota	13th	14th

=== Complete F3 Asian Championship results ===
(key) (Races in bold indicate pole position) (Races in italics indicate fastest lap)

Year	Team	1	2	3	4	5	6	7	8	9	10	11	12	13	14	15	DC	Points
2019	BlackArts Racing Team	SEP; 1; 4	SEP; 2; 3	SEP; 3; 4	CHA; 1; 5	CHA; 2 Ret	CHA; 3; 3	SUZ; 1; 5	SUZ; 2 Ret	SUZ; 3; 2	SIC1; 1; 3	SIC1; 2; 5	SIC1; 3; 8	SIC2; 1; 10	SIC2; 2; 2	SIC2; 3; 4	4th	152

=== Complete Formula Regional Oceania Championship results ===
(key) (Races in bold indicate pole position) (Races in italics indicate fastest lap)

Year	Team	1	2	3	4	5	6	7	8	9	10	11	12	13	14	15	DC	Points
2023	Kiwi Motorsport	HIG; 1	HIG; 2	HIG; 3	TER; 1	TER; 2	TER; 3	MAN; 1	MAN; 2	MAN; 3	HMP; 1; 6	HMP; 2; 4	HMP; 3; 14	TAU; 1	TAU; 2	TAU; 3	18th	44

=== Complete Asian Le Mans Series results ===
(key) (Races in bold indicate pole position) (Races in italics indicate fastest lap)

Year	Entrant	Class	Chassis	Engine	1	2	3	4	5	6	Rank	Points
2023	Leipert Motorsport	GT	Lamborghini Huracán GT3 Evo	Lamborghini DGF 5.2 L V10	DUB; 1; 10	DUB; 2; 12	ABU; 1; 3	ABU; 2; 3			5th	31
2023–24	Leipert Motorsport	GT	Lamborghini Huracán GT3 Evo 2	Lamborghini DGF 5.2 L V10	SEP; 1; 5	SEP; 2 Ret	DUB; Ret	ABU; 1; 2	ABU; 2; 7		7th	34
2024-25	Earl Bamber Motorsport	GT	Aston Martin Vantage AMR GT3 Evo	Aston Martin M177 4.0 L Turbo V8	SEP; 1; 11	SEP; 2; 18	DUB; 1	DUB; 2	ABU; 1; 13	ABU; 2; 8	25th	0

=== Complete IMSA SportsCar Championship results ===
(key) (Races in bold indicate pole position; races in italics indicate fastest lap)

Year	Entrant	Class	Make	Engine	1	2	3	4	5	6	7	8	9	10	Rank	Points
2024	MDK Motorsports	GTD	Porsche 911 GT3 R (992)	Porsche M97/80 4.2 L Flat-6	DAY	SEB	LBH	LGA	WGL	MOS	ELK	VIR	IMS; 12	PET	62nd	210

=== Complete GT World Challenge Australia results ===
(key) (Races in bold indicate pole position) (Races in italics indicate fastest lap)

Year	Team	Car	Class	1	2	3	4	5	6	7	8	9	10	11	12	Pos.	Points
2024	Melbourne Performance Centre	Audi R8 LMS Evo II	Pro-Am	PHI1; 1; 4	PHI1; 2; 1	BEN; 1; 5	BEN; 2; 4	QUE; 1; 3	QUE; 2; 2	PHI2; 1; 10	PHI2; 2; 9	BAT; 1; 3	**BAT**; **2**; **9**			6th	113
2025	Melbourne Performance Centre	Audi R8 LMS Evo II	Pro-Am	PHI; 1; 3	PHI; 2; 5	SYD; 1; 11	SYD; 2; 5	QLD; 1 Ret	QLD; 2; 2	SAN; 1	SAN; 2	BEN; 1	BEN; 2	HAM; 2	HAM; 2	11th	53
2026	Tigani Motorsport	Mercedes-AMG GT3 Evo	Pro-Am	PHI; 1; 4	PHI; 2; 10	**BEN**; **1**; **1**	BEN; 2; 7	QLD; 1; 3	QLD; 2; 1	HID; 1; 7	HID; 2; 5	SYD; 1 Ret	SYD; 2; 2	ADL; 1	ADL; 2	3rd*	119*

=== Complete Bathurst 12 Hour results ===
Year	Team	Co-Drivers	Car	Class	Laps	Pos.	Class Pos.
2025	(Australia) Wall Racing	(Australia) Tony D'Alberto (Australia) Adrian Deitz (Australia) Grant Denyer	Lamborghini Huracán GT3 Evo 2	**S**	303	9th	**1st**
2026	(Australia) Geyer Valmont Racing / Tigani Motorsport	(Australia) Scott Andrews (Australia) Sergio Pires (Australia) Marcel Zalloua	Mercedes-AMG GT3 Evo	**PA**	250	20th	4th

Sporting positions
Preceded by Loris Spinelli; Max Weering	Lamborghini Super Trofeo Europe; Pro Champion; 2023	Succeeded by Incumbent
