= Shota Abkhazava =

Georgian racing driver (born 1971)

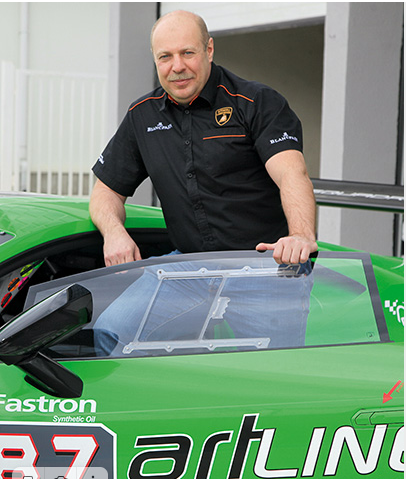
- Born: Shota Merabovich Abkhazava; 12 August 1971 (age 55); Moscow, Soviet Union
- Citizenship: Kazakhstan (Russia) Russian
- Occupations: Racing Driver, Car Engineer, Businessman
- Children: Alexander Abkhazava
- Parents: Merab Abkhazava; Natalia Abkhazava

Shota Merabovich Abkhazava (Russian: Шота Мерабович Абхазава, born 12 August 1971) is a Kazakh race car designer, racing driver, businessman and owner of race tracks in Russia, Georgia and Latvia.

== Racing ==
In 1993, Abkhazava graduated from the Moscow State Automobile and Road Technical University (MADI) trained as race cars engineer. While studying, he was involved into the "Astrada" and "Gardarika" single seater projects. He worked in the MADI Laboratory of Sport Cars, a famous Soviet and Russian car design bureau. In 1998 he established his first race cars design company and a team named "Pilot F3 Engineering". In 1999 the team competed in the very front in the Formula Three Championship of Russia, with Italian driver Fabio Babini at the wheel of the most up-to-date Formula 3 car "Dallara F399". A year after, the team has changed its name to "ArtLine Engineering", and in 2001 another Italian pilot, Maurizio Mediani, brought the first Champion's title to ArtLine. In 2003 Abkhazava moulded the team from Formula 3 into the national Formula 1600. After a year, he announced that the team is ready to use new chassis of its own design, named ArtTech. Meanwhile, for the first time he was elected into the Committee for Circuit Racing of the Russian Automobile Federation as a coordinator of the national Formula 1600. In November 2004 the ArtTech race car was presented to public during "Sport Motor Tuning Exhibition" in Moscow.

In 2005, Abkhazava ran one of the first Russian sports marketing seminars, "Sportsmarketing 2005". Managed by Abkhazava, Formula 1600 was top-ranked as "class of the year" by Russian leading motorsports blog "iloveracing.ru". Abkhazava initiated his first race track project "ADM Raceway" at the Miachkovo airfield. On 23 July 2006 new circuit hosted the first official competitions. After Neva-Ring circuit in St-Petersburg was destroyed, Miachkovo became the only permanent circuit in the Western part of the country, effectively saving national circuit racing from death.

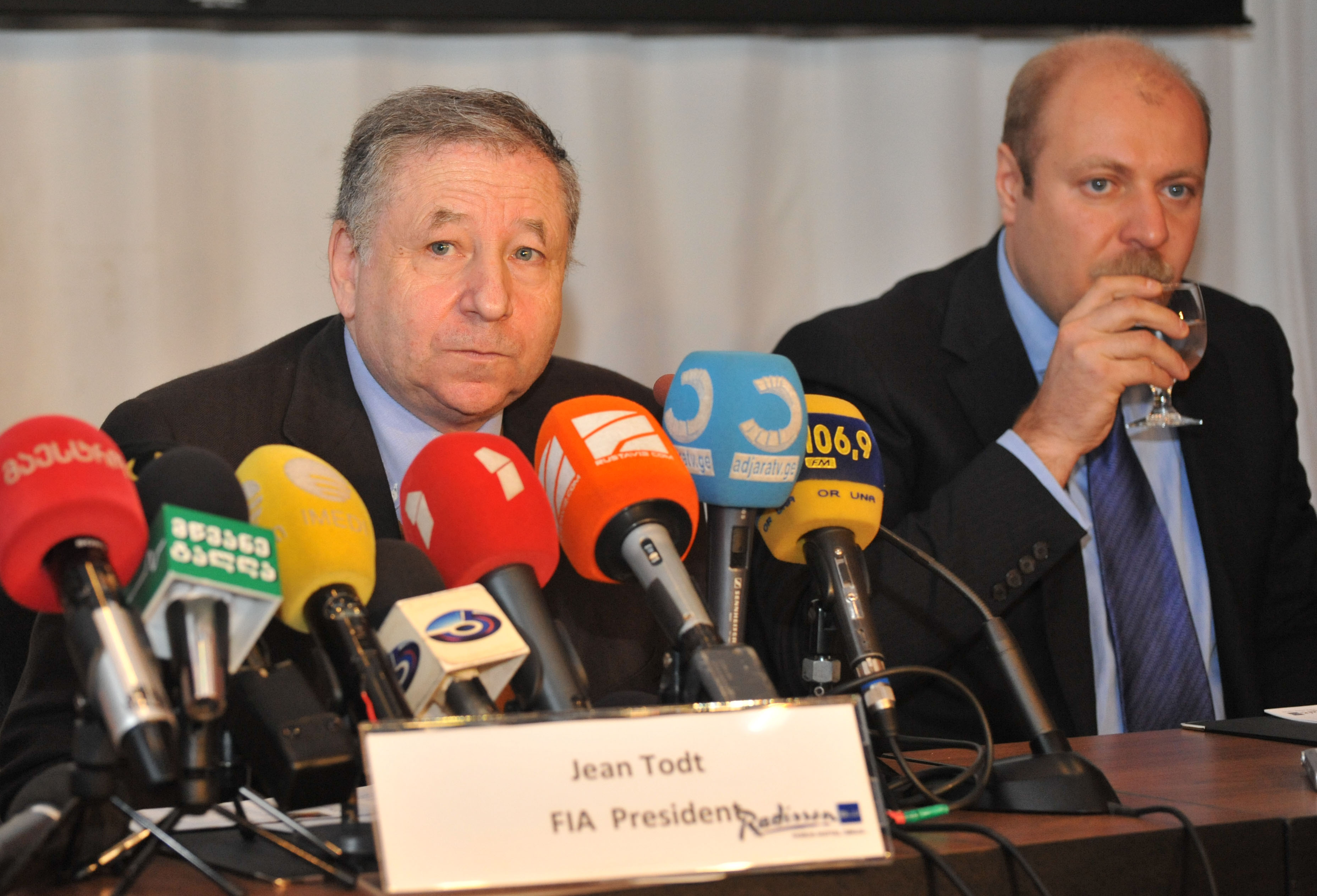
Shota Abkhazava and the FIA president Jean Todt are giving a press-conference in Tbilisi. 22 April 2011

In 2006, Abkhazava argued against Russian Automobile Federation accusing them of deviation from democratic principles. In 2007, he was often invited to be a guest of "Countdown" TV program, a part of Formula One live broadcast to Russia on the RenTV channel. The team won Russian Championship and several laps of the Formula 3 Championship of Finland.

In September 2008, for the first time in history, Abkhazava introduced North Europe Formula 3 Cup (NEZ Cup) that was held at the ADM Raceway near Moscow. At the end of the year, he brought to Russia new racing class "Legend Cars" which produced in Harrisburg, NC. In December, he took part in the Las Vegas Grand Finals of the Legend cars and came second in the Semi-Pro group.

In 2009, Abkhazava's team started to compete in the German ATS Formula-3 Cup with its own chassis ArtTech and won Trophy title. Abkhazava went to Georgian market as a businessman and sport event organizer. In the meantime, he raced in Russian and Georgian Legends competitions and won both the titles.

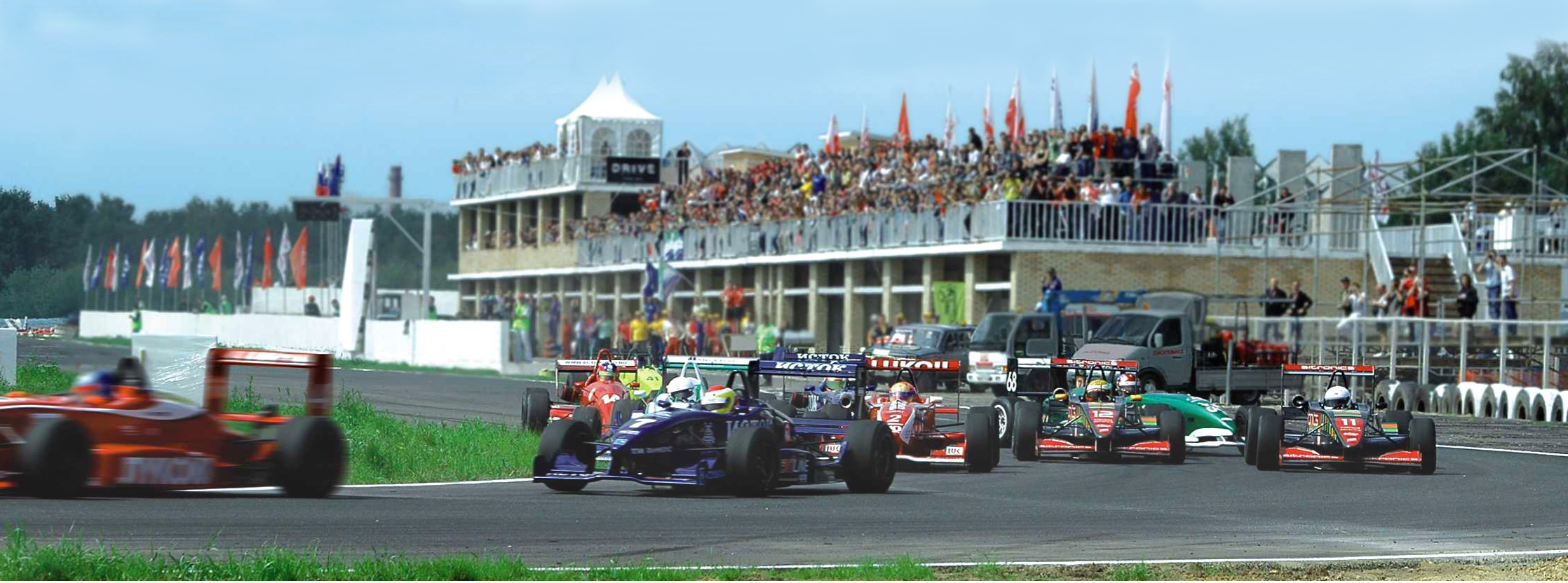
Raceway ADM near Moscow

After successful season of 2010, Abkhazava announced that since 2011 the Formula-3 team moves to the most competitive class of the German cup, "League A". In October 2011, he came first in Spa in the final stage of EU Legends Championship.

In December 2011, Abkhazava proceeded with Rustavi race track reconstruction with $25-million private investments of his own. The track is officially opened in April 2012, getting a new name of "Rustavi International Motorpark". Acting as a president of local motorsport governing body, Georgian AutoSport Association (GASA), within a year he established two new racing series, Legends and Formula Alfa that puts Georgia on the top motorsports level among the Post-Soviet states.

=== Racing career ===
As of 30 May 2024, the Drivers Database reports that Abkhazava has participated in 162 races and won 45 of them.

In 2008, Abkhazava came second in the Legends World Finals as a semi-pro driver and in 2011 he finished third in Pro division. Since 2008, he also won Russian Legend Cup title three times. In the 2012 Georgian Championship he was top-ranked with the most wins (6), pole-positions (7) and fastest laps (3).

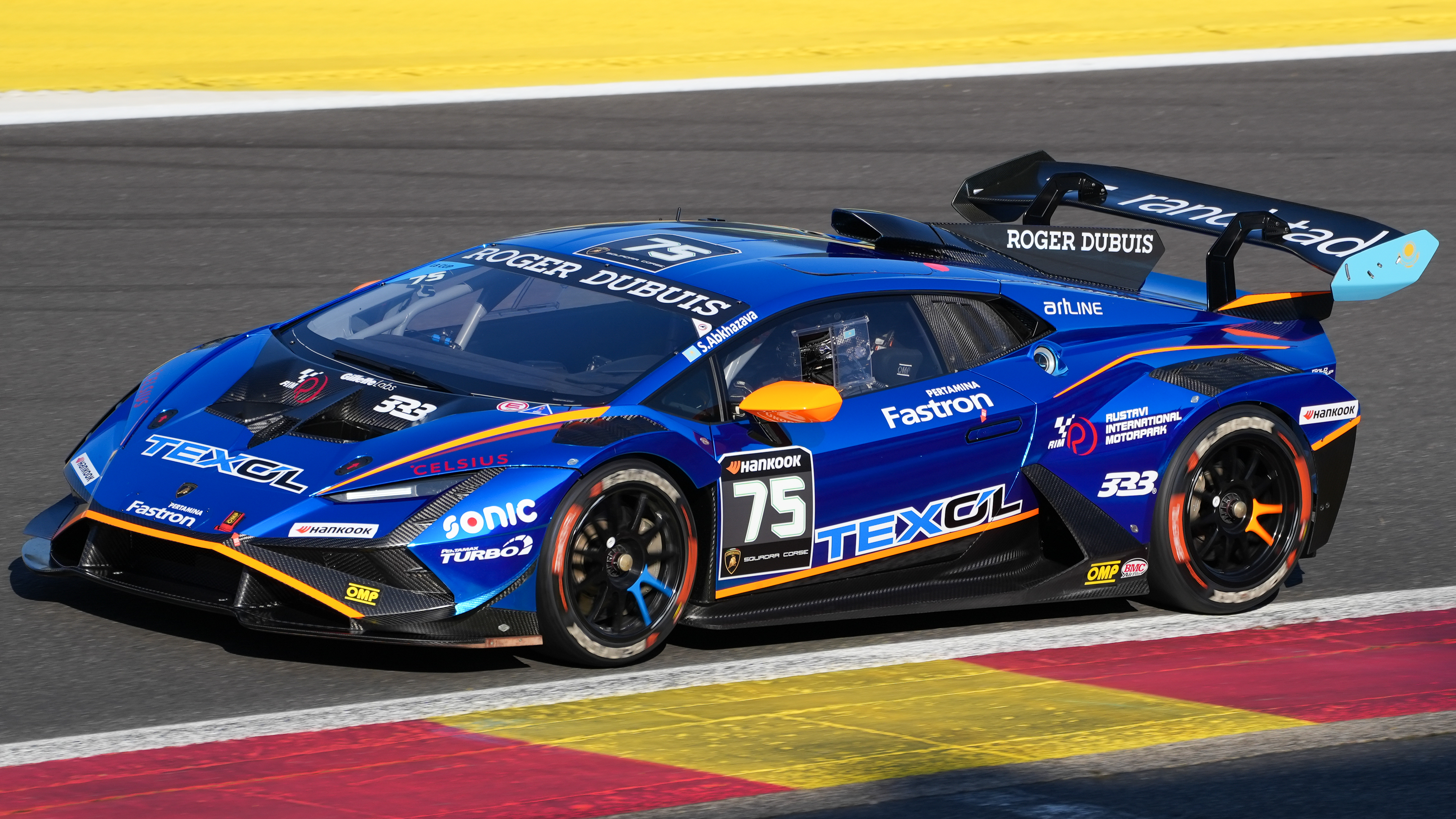
Abkhazava at Circuit de Spa-Francorchamps in 2024

In 2014, Abkhazava joined the Lamborghini Blancpain Super Trofeo series, the "fastest brand trophy of the world", for Automobili Lamborghini Racing Team Luxemburg. He started the season at Monza, achieving second position of the standings after taking two second places in the AM group and 11th overall. In 2015, Shota Abkhazava won the AM title, racing with his own team Artline Georgia.

Abkhazava is currently competing in the 2025 Russian Circuit Racing Series for ArtLine in the Sports Prototype CN class in a Legends car.
