= 2023 Lamborghini Super Trofeo North America =

Season of Motor Racing

The 2023 Lamborghini Super Trofeo North America was the eleventh season of Lamborghini Super Trofeo North America. The season began on May 12 at Laguna Seca and concluded on November 17 with the World Final at Vallelunga, featuring six rounds.

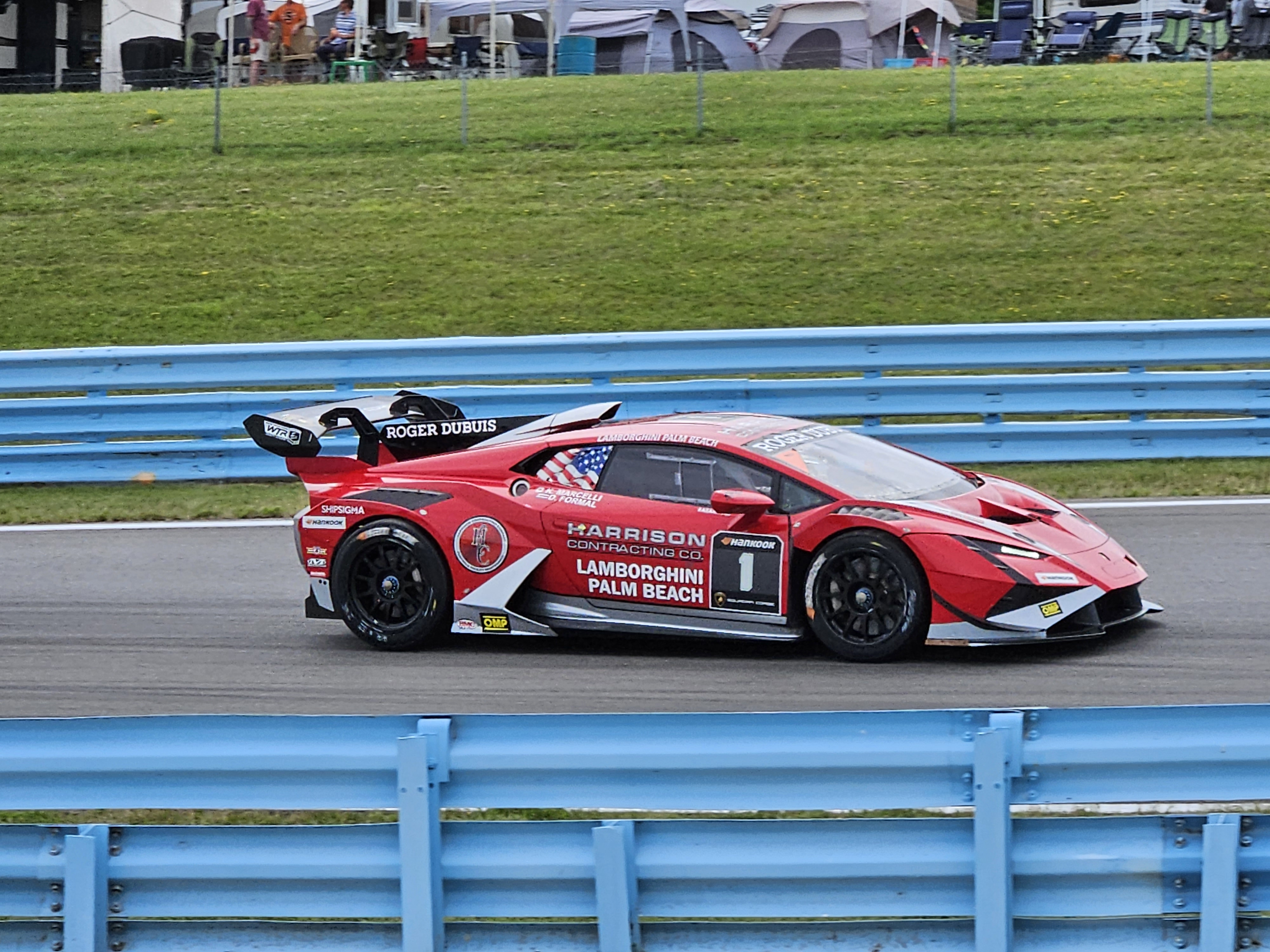
The No. 1 car of Wayne Taylor Racing with Andretti Autosport, driven by Danny Formal and Kyle Marcelli won in the championship in the Pro class.

== Calendar ==
Rnd.	Circuit	Date	Supporting
1	(United States) WeatherTech Raceway Laguna Seca, Monterey, California	May 12–14	IMSA SportsCar Championship
2	(United States) Watkins Glen International, Watkins Glen, New York	June 22–25	IMSA SportsCar Championship
3	(United States) Road America, Elkhart Lake, Wisconsin	August 4–6	IMSA SportsCar Championship
4	(United States) Virginia International Raceway, Alton, Virginia	August 25–27	IMSA SportsCar Championship
5	(United States) Indianapolis Motor Speedway, Speedway, Indiana	September 15–17	IMSA SportsCar Championship
6	(Italy) Vallelunga Circuit, Campagnano di Roma	November 16–17	Lamborghini Super Trofeo World Final

== Entry list ==
All teams use the Lamborghini Huracán Super Trofeo Evo2.

Team	Dealership	No.	Drivers	Class	Rounds
TR3 Racing	(Florida) Miami	07	(United States) Pierre Kleinubing	Am	2
TR3 Racing	(Florida) Miami	07	(United States) Alexandre Lima	Am	2
TR3 Racing	(Florida) Miami	34	(United States) Rogelio Perusquia	LC	1–5
TR3 Racing	(Florida) Miami	34	(United States) Rodrigo Vales	LC	1–5
TR3 Racing	(Florida) Miami	96	(United States) Todd Coleman	Am	2
TR3 Racing	(Florida) Miami	96	(United States) Todd Coleman	PA	3
TR3 Racing	(Florida) Miami	96	(United States) Billy Johnson	PA	3
TR3 Racing	(Florida) Palm Beach	88	(South Africa) Giano Taurino	P	All
TR3 Racing	(Florida) Palm Beach	88	(Sweden) Lucas Petersson	P	1–3, 5–6
Wayne Taylor Racing with Andretti Autosport	(Florida) Palm Beach	1	(Costa Rica) Danny Formal	P	All
Wayne Taylor Racing with Andretti Autosport	(Florida) Palm Beach	1	(Canada) Kyle Marcelli	P	All
Wayne Taylor Racing with Andretti Autosport	(Florida) Palm Beach	84	(United States) Ryan Norman	P	All
Wayne Taylor Racing with Andretti Autosport	(Tennessee) Nashville	8	(United States) Nate Stacy	P	1, 4
Wayne Taylor Racing with Andretti Autosport	(Tennessee) Nashville	8	(United States) Nate Stacy	PA	2–3, 5–6
Wayne Taylor Racing with Andretti Autosport	(Tennessee) Nashville	8	(United States) Nick Persing	PA	2–3, 5–6
Wayne Taylor Racing with Andretti Autosport	(Tennessee) Nashville	10	(United States) Graham Doyle	LC	All
TPC Racing	(Texas) Austin	2	(United States) Alan Grossberg	LC	5–6
TPC Racing	(Texas) Austin	20	(United States) Shehan Chandrasoma	PA	3–6
TPC Racing	(Texas) Austin	20	(United States) Bryson Lew	PA	3
TPC Racing	(Texas) Austin	20	(United States) Nikko Reger	PA	4–6
TPC Racing	(Texas) Austin	82	(United States) Sebastian Carazo	Am	5
TPC Racing	(Texas) Austin	82	(United States) Marco Cirone	Am	5
MCR racing	(Florida) Miami	4	(United States) Bart Collins	LC	5
MCR racing	(Florida) Miami	4	(United States) Michael Mennella	LC	5
Ansa Motorsports	(Florida) Broward	7	(United States) Alexandre Lima	LC	5
Ansa Motorsports	(Florida) Broward	24	(United States) Ron Atapattu	Am	1–3, 5–6
Ansa Motorsports	(Florida) Broward	24	(United States) Kevin Madsen	Am	1–3, 5–6
Ansa Motorsports	(Florida) Broward	30	(France) Nico Jamin	P	1–4, 6
Ansa Motorsports	(Florida) Broward	30	(Colombia) Sebastián Saavedra	P	1–4, 6
Precision Performance Motorsports	(Florida) Palm Beach	9	(United States) Tyler Hoffman	Am	All
Precision Performance Motorsports	(Florida) Palm Beach	9	(United States) Wesley Slimp	Am	All
Precision Performance Motorsports	(Florida) Palm Beach	45	(United States) Rob Walker	Am	All
Precision Performance Motorsports	(Florida) Palm Beach	45	(United States) Christopher Tasca	Am	1–2
Precision Performance Motorsports	(Florida) Palm Beach	46	(United States) Tom Capizzi	PA	1–6
Precision Performance Motorsports	(Florida) Palm Beach	46	(United States) JCD Dubets	PA	1–3, 5–6
Precision Performance Motorsports	(Florida) Palm Beach	47	(United States) Mo Dadkhah	PA	1–4
Precision Performance Motorsports	(Florida) Palm Beach	47	(United States) Cole Loftsgard	PA	1–4
Precision Performance Motorsports	(Florida) Palm Beach	47	(United States) Dominic Starkweather	Am	5
Precision Performance Motorsports	(Florida) Palm Beach	48	(United States) David Staab	Am	All
Precision Performance Motorsports	(Florida) Palm Beach	69	(United States) Glenn McGee	Am	All
Precision Performance Motorsports	(Florida) Palm Beach	69	(United States) Anthony McIntosh	Am	All
Valkyrie Velocity	(Texas) Austin	11	(Armenia) Raymond Davoudi	LC	1–3
Valkyrie Velocity	(Texas) Austin	12	(United States) Dominic Starkweather	Am	1, 3–4
Valkyrie Velocity	(Texas) Austin	12	(United States) Cam Aliabadi	Am	1
Valkyrie Velocity	(Texas) Austin	12	(United States) Tyler Cooke	P	2
Valkyrie Velocity	(Texas) Austin	12	(United States) Dominic Starkweather	P	2
Topp Racing	(California) Newport Beach	11	(Armenia) Raymond Davoudi	LC	4–6
Forte Racing powered by US RaceTronics	(California) Rancho Mirage	13	(United States) Ofir Levy	LC	All
Forte Racing powered by US RaceTronics	(California) Rancho Mirage	86	(United States) Jon Hirshberg	LC	All
Forte Racing powered by US RaceTronics	(California) Beverly Hills	50	(United States) Mark Wilgus	LC	All
Forte Racing powered by US RaceTronics	(California) Beverly Hills	71	(United States) Blake McDonald	LC	5
Forte Racing powered by US RaceTronics	(California) Beverly Hills	71	(United States) Chris Cuevas	LC	5
Forte Racing powered by US RaceTronics	(California) Beverly Hills	71	(United States) Blake McDonald	PA	6
Forte Racing powered by US RaceTronics	(California) Beverly Hills	71	(United States) Patrick Liddy	PA	6
Forte Racing powered by US RaceTronics	(California) San Diego	70	(United States) Jay Logan	PA	1–3, 5–6
Forte Racing powered by US RaceTronics	(California) San Diego	70	(France) Alexandre Prémat	PA	1–3, 5–6
Flying Lizard Motorsports	(California) Newport Beach	14	(United States) Andy Lee	PA	All
Flying Lizard Motorsports	(California) Newport Beach	14	(United States) Slade Stewart	PA	All
Flying Lizard Motorsports	(California) Newport Beach	41	(United States) Marc Miller	PA	All
Flying Lizard Motorsports	(California) Newport Beach	41	(United States) Paul Nemschoff	PA	All
Flying Lizard Motorsports	(California) Newport Beach	64	(United States) Tom Tait	Am	1–5
Flying Lizard Motorsports	(California) Newport Beach	64	(United States) Tom Tait	PA	6
Flying Lizard Motorsports	(California) Newport Beach	64	(United States) Guy Cosmo	PA	6
Flying Lizard Motorsports	(California) Newport Beach	68	(United States) Chris Bellomo	PA	All
Flying Lizard Motorsports	(California) Newport Beach	68	(United States) Johannes van Overbeek	PA	All
NTE Sport LLC	(Florida) Palm Beach	17	(United States) Tiger Tari	LC	1–4
NTE Sport LLC	(Florida) Palm Beach	23	(United States) Christopher Tasca	LC	3–4
NTE Sport LLC	(Texas) Austin	20	(United States) Shehan Chandrasoma	PA	1–2
NTE Sport LLC	(Texas) Austin	20	(United States) Keawn Tandon	PA	1
NTE Sport LLC	(Texas) Austin	20	(United States) Nikko Reger	PA	2
NTE Sport LLC	(Florida) Broward	42	(United States) Luke Berkeley	PA	2–4
NTE Sport LLC	(Florida) Broward	42	(United States) Keawn Tandon	PA	2–4
NTE Sport LLC	(Texas) Dallas	89	(United States) Fred Roberts	LC	1–3
NTE Sport LLC	(Texas) Dallas	99	(United States) Jaden Conwright	P	4
NTE Sport LLC	(Texas) Dallas	99	(United States) Cam Aliabadi	Am	5
NTE Sport LLC	(Utah) Salt Lake	89	(United States) Mark Brummond	LC	4–5
NTE Sport LLC	(Utah) Salt Lake	99	(United States) Jeff Courtney	Am	2–3
World Speed	(California) San Francisco	22	(United States) Sean Prewett	PA	All
World Speed	(California) San Francisco	22	(United States) Carter Williams	PA	All
World Speed	(California) San Francisco	33	(United States) Dan Decker	LC	1–4
Forty7 Motorsports	(Connecticut) Greenwich	55	(United States) Joel Miller	PA	1–2, 4–6
Forty7 Motorsports	(Connecticut) Greenwich	55	(United States) Brett Jacobson	PA	1–2, 4–5
Forty7 Motorsports	(Connecticut) Greenwich	55	(United States) AJ Muss	PA	6
Forty7 Motorsports	(Connecticut) Greenwich	55	(United States) Joel Miller	P	3
Forty7 Motorsports	(Pennsylvania) Philadelphia	66	(United States) AJ Muss	Am	1–5
Forty7 Motorsports	(Pennsylvania) Philadelphia	66	(United States) Lane Vacala	Am	1–5
Forty7 Motorsports	(Pennsylvania) Philadelphia	77	(United States) Jake Walker	P	All

Icon	Class
P	Pro Cup
PA	Pro-Am Cup
Am	Am Cup
LC	LB Cup

== Race results ==
Bold indicates overall winner.

Round		Circuit	Pro Winner	Pro-Am Winner	Am Winner	LB Cup Winner	Report
1	R1	(United States) WeatherTech Raceway Laguna Seca	**No. 1 Wayne Taylor Racing with Andretti Autosport**	No. 68 Flying Lizard Motorsports	No. 24 Ansa Motorsports	No. 50 Forte Racing powered by US RaceTronics	Report
1	R1	(United States) WeatherTech Raceway Laguna Seca	**(Costa Rica) Danny Formal** **(Canada) Kyle Marcelli**	(United States) Chris Bellomo (United States) Johannes van Overbeek	(United States) Ron Atapattu (United States) Kevin Madsen	(United States) Mark Wilgus	Report
1	R2	(United States) WeatherTech Raceway Laguna Seca	**No. 1 Wayne Taylor Racing with Andretti Autosport**	No. 46 Precision Performance Motorsports	No. 48 Precision Performance Motorsports	No. 50 Forte Racing powered by US RaceTronics	Report
1	R2	(United States) WeatherTech Raceway Laguna Seca	**(Costa Rica) Danny Formal** **(Canada) Kyle Marcelli**	(United States) Tom Capizzi (United States) JCD Dubets	(United States) David Staab	(United States) Mark Wilgus	Report
2	R1	(United States) Watkins Glen International	**No. 1 Wayne Taylor Racing with Andretti Autosport**	No. 46 Precision Performance Motorsports	No. 48 Precision Performance Motorsports	No. 50 Forte Racing powered by US RaceTronics	Report
2	R1	(United States) Watkins Glen International	**(Costa Rica) Danny Formal** **(Canada) Kyle Marcelli**	(United States) Tom Capizzi (United States) JCD Dubets	(United States) David Staab	(United States) Mark Wilgus	Report
2	R2	(United States) Watkins Glen International	**No. 1 Wayne Taylor Racing with Andretti Autosport**	No. 46 Precision Performance Motorsports	No. 9 Precision Performance Motorsports	No. 13 Forte Racing powered by US RaceTronics	Report
2	R2	(United States) Watkins Glen International	**(Costa Rica) Danny Formal** **(Canada) Kyle Marcelli**	(United States) Tom Capizzi (United States) JCD Dubets	(United States) Tyler Hoffman (United States) Wesley Slimp	(United States) Ofir Levy	Report
3	R1	(United States) Road America	**No. 1 Wayne Taylor Racing with Andretti Autosport**	No. 8 Wayne Taylor Racing with Andretti Autosport	No. 12 Valkyrie Velocity	No. 10 Wayne Taylor Racing with Andretti Autosport	Report
3	R1	(United States) Road America	**(Costa Rica) Danny Formal** **(Canada) Kyle Marcelli**	(United States) Nick Persing (United States) Nate Stacy	(United States) Dominic Starkweather	(United States) Graham Doyle	Report
3	R2	(United States) Road America	**No. 1 Wayne Taylor Racing with Andretti Autosport**	No. 42 NTE Sport LLC	No. 69 Precision Performance Motorsports	No. 50 Forte Racing powered by US RaceTronics	Report
3	R2	(United States) Road America	**(Costa Rica) Danny Formal** **(Canada) Kyle Marcelli**	(United States) Luke Berkeley (United States) Keawn Tandon	(United States) Glenn McGee (United States) Anthony McIntosh	(United States) Mark Wilgus	Report
4	R1	(United States) Virginia International Raceway	**No. 1 Wayne Taylor Racing with Andretti Autosport**	No. 42 NTE Sport LLC	No. 69 Precision Performance Motorsports	No. 50 Forte Racing powered by US RaceTronics	Report
4	R1	(United States) Virginia International Raceway	**(Costa Rica) Danny Formal** **(Canada) Kyle Marcelli**	(United States) Luke Berkeley (United States) Keawn Tandon	(United States) Glenn McGee (United States) Anthony McIntosh	(United States) Mark Wilgus	Report
4	R2	(United States) Virginia International Raceway	**No. 1 Wayne Taylor Racing with Andretti Autosport**	No. 42 NTE Sport LLC	No. 69 Precision Performance Motorsports	No. 86 Forte Racing powered by US RaceTronics	Report
4	R2	(United States) Virginia International Raceway	**(Costa Rica) Danny Formal** **(Canada) Kyle Marcelli**	(United States) Luke Berkeley (United States) Keawn Tandon	(United States) Glenn McGee (United States) Anthony McIntosh	(United States) Jon Hirshberg	Report
5	R1	(United States) Indianapolis Motor Speedway	**No. 84 Wayne Taylor Racing with Andretti Autosport**	No. 8 Wayne Taylor Racing with Andretti Autosport	No. 69 Precision Performance Motorsports	No. 10 Wayne Taylor Racing with Andretti Autosport	Report
5	R1	(United States) Indianapolis Motor Speedway	**(United States) Ryan Norman**	(United States) Nick Persing (United States) Nate Stacy	(United States) Glenn McGee (United States) Anthony McIntosh	(United States) Graham Doyle	Report
5	R2	(United States) Indianapolis Motor Speedway	**No. 84 Wayne Taylor Racing with Andretti Autosport**	No. 42 NTE Sport LLC	No. 69 Precision Performance Motorsports	No. 13 Forte Racing powered by US RaceTronics	Report
5	R2	(United States) Indianapolis Motor Speedway	**(United States) Ryan Norman**	(United States) Luke Berkeley (United States) Keawn Tandon	(United States) Glenn McGee (United States) Anthony McIntosh	(United States) Ofir Levy	Report
6	R1	(Italy) Vallelunga Circuit	**No. 101 (Note: Race numbers are added by 100 for all North American entries in World Finals.) Wayne Taylor Racing with Andretti Autosport**	No. 171 Forte Racing powered by US RaceTronics	No. 109 Precision Performance Motorsports	No. 110 Wayne Taylor Racing with Andretti Autosport	Report
6	R1	(Italy) Vallelunga Circuit	**(Costa Rica) Danny Formal** **(Canada) Kyle Marcelli**	(United States) Patrick Liddy (United States) Blake McDonald	(United States) Tyler Hoffman (United States) Wesley Slimp	(United States) Graham Doyle	Report
6	R2	(Italy) Vallelunga Circuit	**No. 101 Wayne Taylor Racing with Andretti Autosport**	No. 120 TPC Racing	No. 148 Precision Performance Motorsports	No. 110 Wayne Taylor Racing with Andretti Autosport	Report
6	R2	(Italy) Vallelunga Circuit	**(Costa Rica) Danny Formal** **(Canada) Kyle Marcelli**	(United States) Shehan Chandrasoma (United States) Nikko Reger	(United States) David Staab	(United States) Graham Doyle	Report

== Championship standings ==
=== Points system ===
Championship points are awarded in each class at the finish of each event. Points are awarded based on finishing positions in the race as shown in the chart below.

Position	1	2	3	4	5	6	7	8	9	10	Pole
Race	15	12	10	8	6	5	4	3	2	1	1

Pole Position bonus point is not awarded if the starting grid is determined by “Other Means”.

For teams and dealerships championship, each team or dealership takes the points of 2 (two) highest-placing entries within class. Additional points are also awarded for each race as follows:

- 1 (one) point for each Class Pole Position.
- 1 (one) point for each car entered (and started the race), across all classes.

=== Driver Championship ===
Pos.	Drivers	LGA (United States)		WGL (Note: Grid for Race 2 at Watkins Glen was set by “Other Means” (qualifying session shortened), no pole position point awarded.) (United States)		ELK (United States)		VIR (United States)		IMS (United States)		VAL (Italy)		Points
Pro
1	(Costa Rica) Danny Formal (Canada) Kyle Marcelli	**1**	**1**	1	1	1	1	**1**	**1**	**2**	**2**	**1**	1	181
2	(United States) Ryan Norman	2	2	3	6	**2**	**6**	2	3	1	1	2	**2**	135
3	(South Africa) Giano Taurino	4	3	**2**	2	3	5	6	2	4	4	3	3	112
4	(France) Nico Jamin (Colombia) Sebastián Saavedra	3	4	5	3	4	4	4	4	3	5	4	5	96
5	(Sweden) Lucas Petersson	4	3	**2**	2	3	5			4	4	3	3	95
6	(United States) Jake Walker	6	6	4	4	5	3	7	6	5	3	5	4	81
7	(United States) Nate Stacy	5	5					3	7					26
8	(United States) Joel Miller					6	2							17
9	(United States) Jaden Conwright							5	5					12
10	(United States) Tyler Cooke (United States) Dominic Starkweather			6	5									11
Pro-Am
1	(United States) Keawn Tandon	3	2	4	2	3	1	**1**	1	2	**1**			126
2	(United States) Luke Berkeley			4	2	3	1	**1**	1	2	**1**			104
3	(United States) Shehan Chandrasoma	3	2	3	5	11	3	5	9	3	3	2	1	103
4	(United States) Nick Persing (United States) Nate Stacy			6	4	1	**2**			1	2	5	2	86
5	(United States) Andy Lee (United States) Slade Stewart	5	8	8	7	**5**	4	4	2	5	4	4	6	78
6	(United States) Tom Capizzi	**6**	1	**1**	1	10	11	9	5	4	5	11	9	77
6	(United States) JCD Dubets	**6**	1	**1**	1	10	11			4	5	11	9	77
7	(United States) Chris Bellomo (United States) Johannes van Overbeek	1	7	9	9	2	5	6	3	9	9	3	7	74
8	(United States) Nikko Reger			5	3			5	9	3	3	2	1	71
9	(United States) Marc Miller (United States) Paul Nemschoff	7	**3**	2	8	7	7	2	**6**	DNS	8	9	5	67
10	(United States) Jay Logan (France) Alexandre Prémat	2	9	3	6	4	6			6	6	**7**	10	58
11	(United States) Mo Dadkhah (United States) Cole Loftsgard	4	4	7	5	8	10	3	4					48
12	(United States) Joel Miller	8	6	10	DNS			7	7	7	7	6	3	40
13	(United States) Sean Prewett (United States) Carter Williams	9	5	11	10	9	9	8	8	**8**	10	10	11	24
14	(United States) Brett Jacobson	8	6	10	DNS			7	7	7	7			25
15	(United States) Patrick Liddy (United States) Blake McDonald											1	**4**	24
16	(United States) AJ Muss											6	3	15
17	(United States) Bryson Lew					11	3							10
18	(United States) Todd Coleman (United States) Billy Johnson					6	8							8
19	(United States) Guy Cosmo (United States) Tom Tait											8	8	6
Am
1	(United States) Glenn McGee (United States) Anthony McIntosh	3	2	2	2	**5**	1	**1**	1	**1**	1	**2**	**DNS**	144
2	(United States) David Staab	4	1	**1**	3	4	5	4	2	3	4	5	1	122
3	(United States) Tyler Hoffman (United States) Wesley Slimp	**2**	7	8	1	6	8	2	**3**	4	**2**	1	4	110
4	(United States) AJ Muss (United States) Lane Vacala	5	5	4	5	8	6	3	7	2	3			70
5	(United States) Rob Walker	8	**8**	7	8	2	7	5	6	8	9	4	2	66
6	(United States) Ron Atapattu (United States) Kevin Madsen	1	6	6	7	7	9			DNS	7	3	3	59
7	(United States) Dominic Starkweather	6	3			1	**4**	7	5	5	10			56
8	(United States) Tom Tait	7	4	DNS	DNS	9	3	6	4	9	5			45
9	(United States) Jeff Courtney			3	6	3	2							37
10	(United States) Cam Aliabadi	6	3							6	6			15
11	(United States) Christopher Tasca	8	**8**	7	8									14
12	(United States) Todd Coleman			9	4									10
13	(United States) Pierre Kleinubing (United States) Alexandre Lima			5	9									8
14	(United States) Sebastian Carazo									7	8			7
-	(United States) Marco Cirone									DNS	DNS			0
LB Cup
1	(United States) Mark Wilgus	**1**	1	1	2	2	**1**	**1**	**6**	2	2	2	2	156
2	(United States) Graham Doyle	7	5	2	7	1	3	5	2	1	**10**	**1**	**1**	118
3	(United States) Ofir Levy	3	9	4	1	10	2	3	4	4	1	4	3	107
4	(United States) Jon Hirshberg	9	**3**	6	5	8	7	4	1	**3**	3	5	5	87
5	(United States) Fred Roberts	2	2	3	3	**3**	5							61
6	(Armenia) Raymond Davoudi	8	4	7	9	9	6	6	9	8	4	3	4	60
7	(United States) Rogelio Perusquia (United States) Rodrigo Vales	5	6	**5**	4	7	4	8	7	6	9			52
8	(United States) Tiger Tari	4	8	8	8	6	10	7	5					33
9	(United States) Mark Brummond							2	3	10	6			28
10	(United States) Dan Decker	6	7	DNS	6	5	8	9	10					26
11	(United States) Christopher Tasca					4	9	10	8					14
12	(United States) Alan Grossberg									9	11	6	6	12
13	(United States) Chris Cuevas (United States) Blake McDonald									7	5			10
14	(United States) Alexandre Lima									5	8			9
15	(United States) Bart Collins (United States) Michael Mennella									11	7			4

Colour	Result
Gold	Winner
Silver	Second place
Bronze	Third place
Green	Points classification
Blue	Non-points classification
Blue	Non-classified finish (NC)
Purple	Retired, not classified (Ret)
Red	Did not qualify (DNQ)
Red	Did not pre-qualify (DNPQ)
Black	Disqualified (DSQ)
White	Did not start (DNS)
White	Withdrew (WD)
White	Race cancelled (C)
Blank	Did not practice (DNP)
Blank	Did not arrive (DNA)
Blank	Excluded (EX)

**Bold** - Pole position

Italics - Fastest lap

=== Team championship ===
Pos.	Team	LGA (United States)		WGL (United States)		ELK (United States)		VIR (United States)		IMS (United States)		VAL (Italy)		Points
1	Wayne Taylor Racing with Andretti Autosport	1^{1}	1^{1}	1	1	1^{1}	1^{2}	1^{2}	1^{1}	1^{1}	1^{2}	1^{2}	1^{2}	394
1	Wayne Taylor Racing with Andretti Autosport	2_{4}	2_{4}	2_{4}	4_{4}	1_{4}	2_{4}	2_{4}	2_{4}	1_{4}	2_{4}	1_{4}	1_{4}	394
2	Precision Performance Motorsports	2^{2}	1^{1}	1^{2}	1	2^{1}	1	1^{1}	1^{1}	1^{1}	1^{1}	1^{1}	1^{1}	394
2	Precision Performance Motorsports	3_{6}	1_{6}	1_{6}	1_{6}	4_{6}	5_{6}	2_{6}	2_{6}	3_{6}	2_{6}	2_{5}	2_{4}	394
3	Forte Racing powered by US RaceTronics	1^{1}	1^{1}	1	1	2	1^{1}	1^{1}	1^{1}	2^{1}	1	1^{1}	2^{1}	355
3	Forte Racing powered by US RaceTronics	2_{4}	3_{4}	3_{4}	2_{4}	4_{4}	2_{4}	3_{3}	4_{3}	3_{5}	2_{5}	2_{5}	3_{5}	355
4	NTE Sport LLC	2	2	3	2	3^{1}	1	1^{1}	1	2	1^{1}			269
4	NTE Sport LLC	3_{3}	2_{3}	3_{5}	3_{5}	3_{5}	2_{5}	2_{5}	3_{5}	6_{3}	6_{3}			269
5	Flying Lizard Motorsports	1	3^{1}	2	7	2^{1}	3	2	2^{1}	5	4	3	5	238
5	Flying Lizard Motorsports	5_{4}	4_{4}	8_{4}	8_{4}	5_{4}	4_{4}	4_{4}	3_{4}	9_{4}	5_{4}	4_{4}	6_{4}	238
6	Forty7 Motorsports	5	5	4	4	5	2	3	6	2	3	5	3	208
6	Forty7 Motorsports	6_{3}	6_{3}	4_{3}	5_{3}	6_{3}	3_{3}	7_{3}	7_{3}	5_{3}	3_{3}	6_{2}	4_{2}	208
7	TR3 Racing	4	3	2^{2}	2	3	4	6	2	4	4	3_{1}	3_{1}	193
7	TR3 Racing	5_{2}	6_{2}	5_{4}	4_{4}	6_{3}	5_{3}	8_{2}	7_{2}	6_{2}	9_{2}			193
8	Ansa Motorsports	1	4	5	3	4	4	4_{1}	4_{1}	3	5	3	3	184
8	Ansa Motorsports	3_{2}	6_{2}	6_{2}	7_{2}	7_{2}	9_{2}			5_{3}	7_{3}	4_{2}	5_{2}	184
9	Valkyrie Velocity	6	3	6	5	1	4^{1}	7_{1}	5_{1}					98
9	Valkyrie Velocity	8_{2}	4_{2}	7_{2}	9_{2}	9_{2}	6_{2}							98
10	TPC Racing					11_{1}	3_{1}	5_{1}	9_{1}	3	3	2	1	96
10	TPC Racing									7_{3}	8_{3}	6_{2}	6_{2}	96
11	World Speed	6	5	11	6	5	8	8	8	8^{1}_{1}	10_{1}	10_{1}	11_{1}	70
11	World Speed	9_{2}	7_{2}	DNS_{1}	10_{2}	9_{2}	9_{2}	9_{2}	10_{2}					70
12	Topp Racing							6_{1}	9_{1}	8_{1}	4_{1}	3_{1}	4_{1}	42
13	MCR racing									11_{1}	7_{1}			6

Colour	Result
Gold	Winner
Silver	Second place
Bronze	Third place
Green	Points classification
Blue	Non-points classification
Blue	Non-classified finish (NC)
Purple	Retired, not classified (Ret)
Red	Did not qualify (DNQ)
Red	Did not pre-qualify (DNPQ)
Black	Disqualified (DSQ)
White	Did not start (DNS)
White	Withdrew (WD)
White	Race cancelled (C)
Blank	Did not practice (DNP)
Blank	Did not arrive (DNA)
Blank	Excluded (EX)

^{Superscript} - Class Pole Positions earned

_{Subscript} - Cars entered and started

=== Dealer championship ===
Pos.	Dealership	LGA (United States)		WGL (United States)		ELK (United States)		VIR (United States)		IMS (United States)		VAL (Italy)		Points
1	(Florida) Palm Beach	1^{3}	1^{2}	1^{3}	1	1^{2}	1^{1}	1^{2}	1^{2}	1^{2}	1^{2}	1^{2}	1^{2}	494
1	(Florida) Palm Beach	2_{10}	1_{10}	1_{10}	1_{10}	2_{11}	1_{11}	1_{11}	1_{11}	1_{9}	1_{9}	1_{8}	1_{7}	494
2	(Florida) Broward	1	4	4	2	3	1	1^{1}	1	2	1^{1}	3	3	271
2	(Florida) Broward	3_{2}	6_{2}	5_{3}	3_{3}	4_{3}	4_{3}	4_{2}	4_{2}	3_{4}	5_{4}	4_{2}	5_{2}	271
3	(Tennessee) Nashville	5	5	2	4	1	2^{1}	3	2	1	2^{1}	1^{1}	1^{1}	254
3	(Tennessee) Nashville	7_{2}	5_{2}	6_{2}	7_{2}	1_{2}	3_{2}	5_{2}	7_{2}	1_{2}	10_{2}	5_{2}	2_{2}	254
4	(California) Newport Beach	1	3^{1}	2	7	2^{1}	3	2	2^{1}	5	4	3	4	252
4	(California) Newport Beach	5_{4}	4_{4}	8_{3}	8_{3}	5_{4}	4_{4}	4_{5}	3_{5}	8_{5}	4_{5}	3_{5}	5_{5}	252
5	(California) Rancho Mirage	3	3^{1}	4	1	8	2	3	1	3^{1}	1	4	3	218
5	(California) Rancho Mirage	9_{2}	9_{2}	6_{2}	5_{2}	10_{2}	7_{2}	4_{2}	4_{2}	4_{2}	3_{2}	5_{2}	5_{2}	218
6	(Texas) Austin	3	2	5	3	1	3^{1}	5	5	3	3	2	1	214
6	(Texas) Austin	6_{3}	3_{3}	6_{3}	5_{3}	9_{3}	4_{3}	7_{2}	9_{2}	7_{3}	8_{3}	6_{2}	6_{2}	214
7	(California) Beverly Hills	1^{1}_{1}	1_{1}	1_{1}	2_{1}	2_{1}	1^{1}_{1}	1^{1}_{1}	6^{1}_{1}	2	2	1	2^{1}	206
7	(California) Beverly Hills									7_{2}	5_{2}	2_{2}	4_{2}	206
8	(Pennsylvania) Philadelphia	5	5	4	4	5	3	3	6	2	3	5_{1}	4_{1}	173
8	(Pennsylvania) Philadelphia	6_{2}	6_{2}	4_{2}	5_{2}	8_{2}	6_{2}	7_{2}	7_{2}	5_{2}	3_{2}			173
9	(Florida) Miami	5_{1}	6_{1}	5^{1}	4	6	4	8_{1}	7_{1}	6	7			96
9	(Florida) Miami			5_{3}	4_{3}	7_{2}	8_{2}			11_{2}	9_{2}			96
10	(Texas) Dallas	2_{1}	2_{1}	3_{1}	3_{1}	3^{1}_{1}	5_{1}	5_{1}	5_{1}	6_{1}	6_{1}			93
11	(Utah) Salt Lake			3_{1}	6_{1}	3_{1}	2_{1}	2_{1}	3_{1}	10_{1}	6_{1}			73
12	(California) San Francisco	6	5	11	6	5	8	8	8	8^{1}_{1}	10_{1}	10_{1}	11_{1}	70
12	(California) San Francisco	9_{2}	7_{2}	DNS_{1}	10_{2}	9_{2}	9_{2}	9_{2}	10_{2}					70
13	(Connecticut) Greenwich	8_{1}	6_{1}	10_{1}	DNS_{0}	6_{1}	2_{1}	7_{1}	7_{1}	7_{1}	7_{1}	6_{1}	3_{1}	68
13	(California) San Diego	2_{1}	9_{1}	3_{1}	6_{1}	4_{1}	6_{1}			6_{1}	6_{1}	7^{1}_{1}	10_{1}	68

Colour	Result
Gold	Winner
Silver	Second place
Bronze	Third place
Green	Points classification
Blue	Non-points classification
Blue	Non-classified finish (NC)
Purple	Retired, not classified (Ret)
Red	Did not qualify (DNQ)
Red	Did not pre-qualify (DNPQ)
Black	Disqualified (DSQ)
White	Did not start (DNS)
White	Withdrew (WD)
White	Race cancelled (C)
Blank	Did not practice (DNP)
Blank	Did not arrive (DNA)
Blank	Excluded (EX)

^{Superscript} - Class Pole Positions earned

_{Subscript} - Cars entered
