= 2025 Lamborghini Super Trofeo North America =

13th season of a one-make racing series by Lamborghini

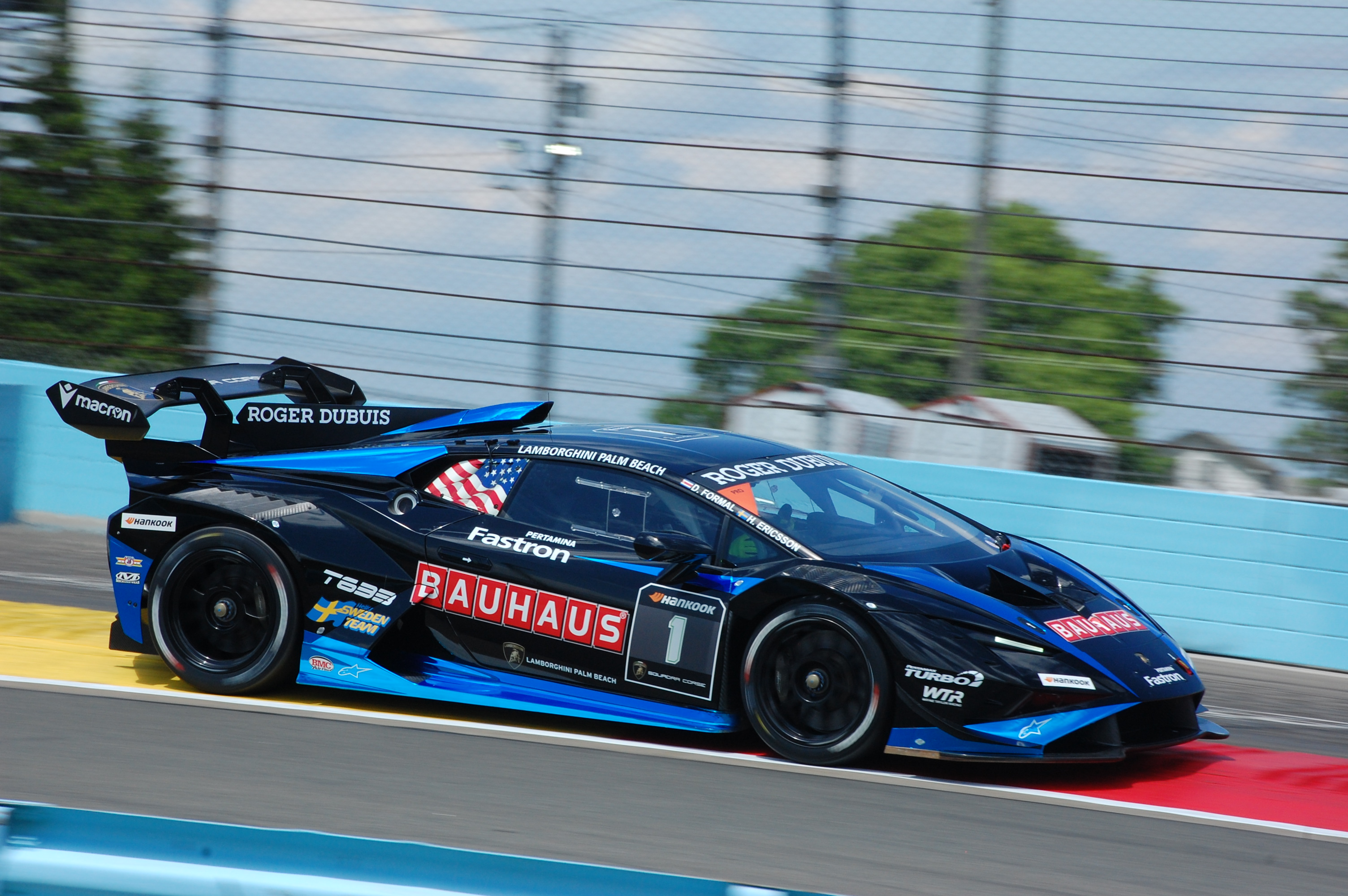
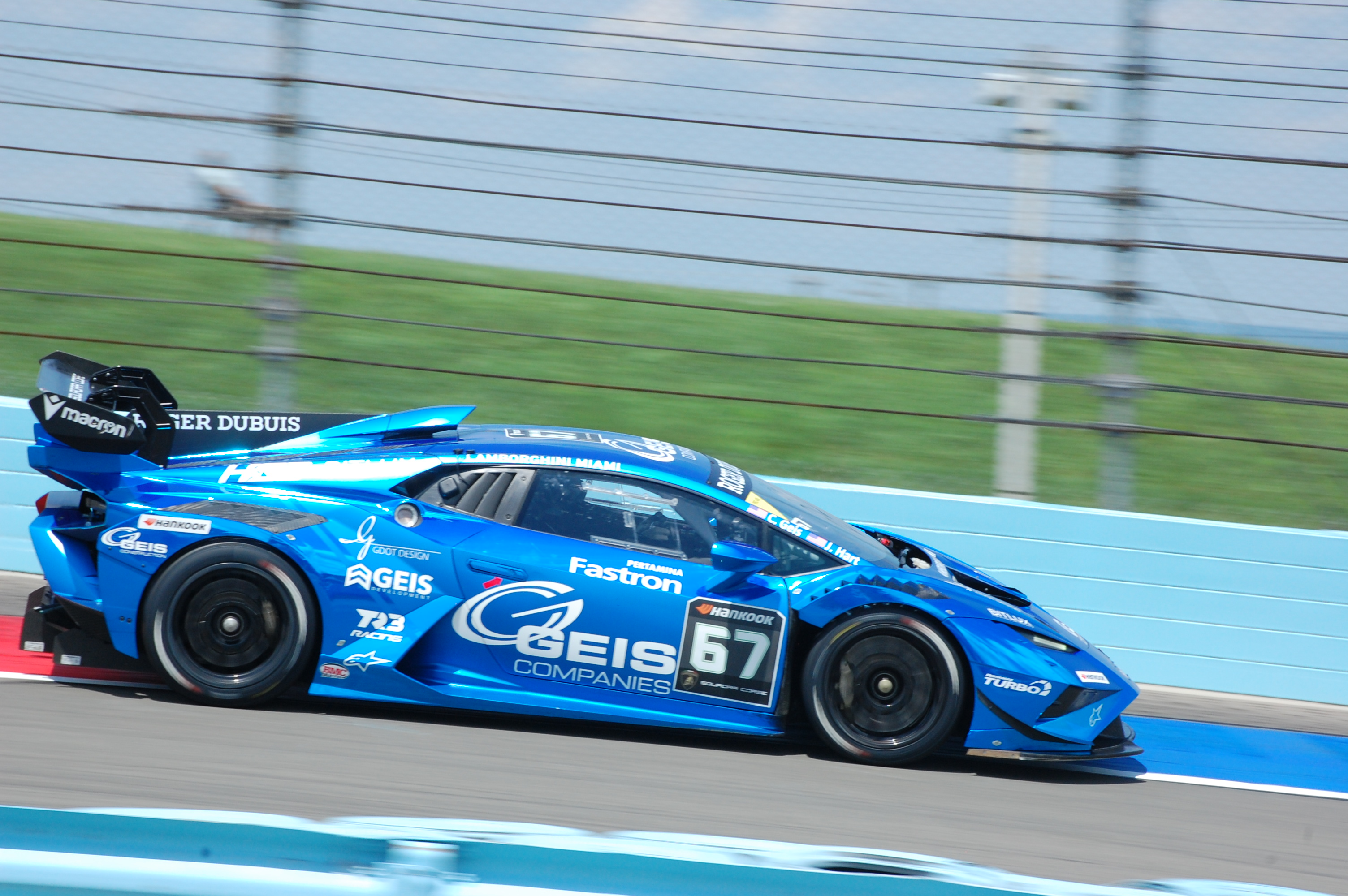
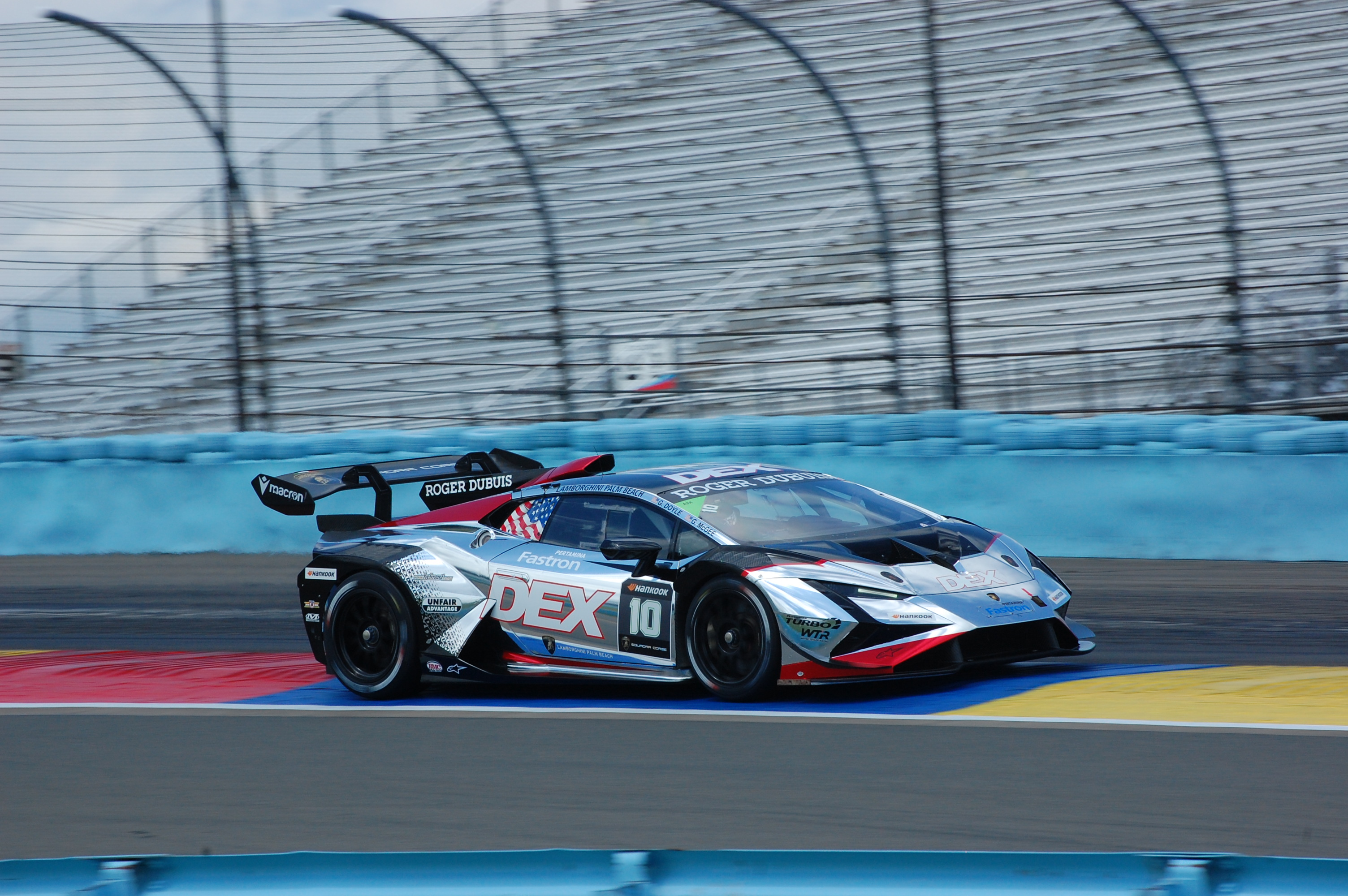
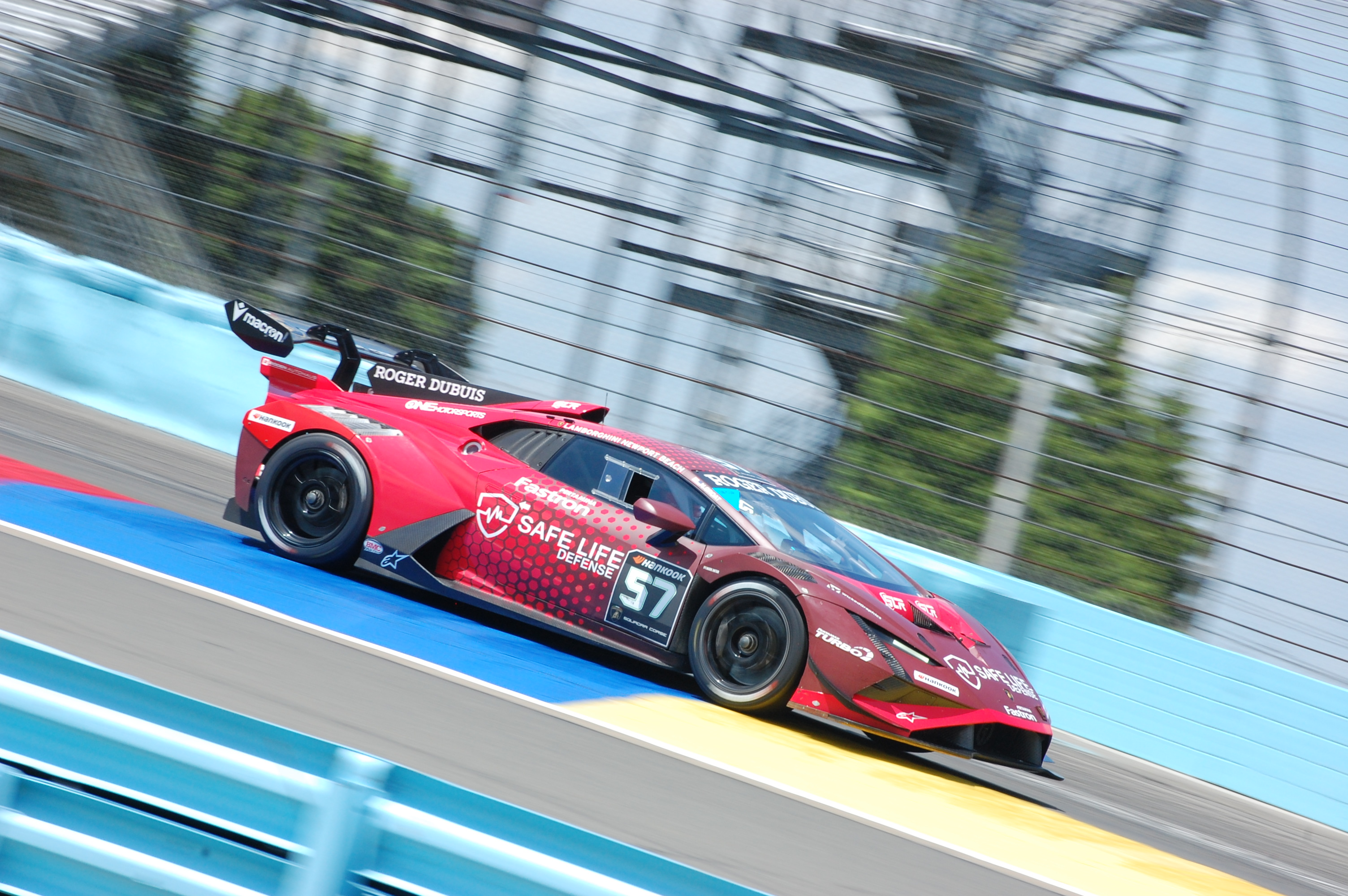
The No. 1 Wayne Taylor Racing won the Pro Drivers' and Teams' championships. The No. 67 TR3 Racing won the Pro-Am Drivers' Championship. The No. 10 Wayne Taylor Racing won the Drivers' Championship. Nick Groat won the LB Cup Drivers' Championship with the No. 57 car.

The 2025 Lamborghini Super Trofeo North America was the thirteenth season of Lamborghini Super Trofeo North America. The season began on March 13 at Sebring and concluded on November 7 with the World Final at Misano, featuring six rounds.

== Calendar ==
Rnd.	Circuit	Date	Supporting
1	Sebring International Raceway, Sebring, Florida	March 12–14	IMSA SportsCar Championship
2	WeatherTech Raceway Laguna Seca, Monterey, California	May 9–11	IMSA SportsCar Championship
3	(New York (state)) Watkins Glen International, Watkins Glen, New York	June 19–21	IMSA SportsCar Championship
4	Road America, Elkhart Lake, Wisconsin	August 1–3	IMSA SportsCar Championship
5	Indianapolis Motor Speedway, Speedway, Indiana	September 18–20	IMSA SportsCar Championship
6	Misano World Circuit, Misano Adriatico, Emilia-Romagna	November 6–7	Lamborghini Super Trofeo World Final

== Entry list ==
All teams use the Lamborghini Huracán Super Trofeo Evo2.

Team	Dealership	No.	Drivers	Class	Rounds
Wayne Taylor Racing	(Florida) Palm Beach	1	(Sweden) Hampus Ericsson	P	All
Wayne Taylor Racing	(Florida) Palm Beach	1	(Costa Rica) Danny Formal	P	All
Wayne Taylor Racing	(Florida) Palm Beach	8	(United States) Nick Persing	P	All
Wayne Taylor Racing	(Florida) Palm Beach	8	(United States) Giano Taurino	P	5
Wayne Taylor Racing	(Florida) Palm Beach	10	(United States) Graham Doyle	Am	All
Wayne Taylor Racing	(Florida) Palm Beach	10	(United States) Glenn McGee	Am	All
Wayne Taylor Racing	(Florida) Palm Beach	69	(New Zealand) Brendon Leitch	PA	1–3
Wayne Taylor Racing	(Florida) Palm Beach	69	(United States) Anthony McIntosh	PA	1–3
Wayne Taylor Racing	(Florida) Palm Beach	69	(United States) Jackson Lee	PA	4–5
Wayne Taylor Racing	(Florida) Palm Beach	69	(United States) Trent Hindman	PA	4–5
RAFA Racing Team	(Texas) Austin	2	(United States) Lindsay Brewer	Am	All
RAFA Racing Team	(Texas) Austin	2	(United Kingdom) Jem Hepworth	Am	All
RAFA Racing Team	(Texas) Austin	68	(Brazil) Werner Neugebauer	P	All
RAFA Racing Team	(Texas) Austin	68	(United States) Cameron Lawrence	P	1–2
RAFA Racing Team	(Texas) Austin	68	(Brazil) Kiko Porto	P	3–4
RAFA Racing Team	(Texas) Austin	68	(United States) Augusto Soto-Schirripa	P	5–6
RAFA Racing Team	(Texas) Austin	81	(Brazil) Kiko Porto	PA	1–2
RAFA Racing Team	(Texas) Austin	81	(Brazil) Nicholas Monteiro	PA	1–2
RAFA Racing Team	(Texas) Austin	81	(United States) Tyler Gonzalez	PA	3
RAFA Racing Team	(Texas) Austin	81	(United States) Harry Gottsacker	PA	3
RAFA Racing Team	(Texas) Austin	81	(United States) Coby Shield	PA	4
RAFA Racing Team	(Texas) Austin	81	(United States) Sebastian Vasan	PA	4
RAFA Racing Team	(Connecticut) Greenwich	99	(United States) Rocky T Bolduc	LC	1–2, 4–6
Daxxon Gray with MLT Motorsports	(Arizona) North Scottsdale	3	(United States) Coby Shield	PA	2–3
Daxxon Gray with MLT Motorsports	(Arizona) North Scottsdale	3	(United States) Sebastian Vasan	PA	2–3
MLT Motorsports	(Connecticut) Greenwich	42	(United States) Adrian Kunzle	Am	1
MLT Motorsports	(Connecticut) Greenwich	42	(United States) Kevin Madsen	Am	1
MLT Motorsports	(Connecticut) Greenwich	42	(United States) Adrian Kunzle	LC	2
ANSA MOTORSPORTS	(Florida) Broward	4	(France) Enzo Geraci	P	All
ANSA MOTORSPORTS	(Florida) Broward	4	(United States) Colin Queen	P	All
ANSA MOTORSPORTS	(Florida) Broward	7	(United States) Jeff Courtney	Am	5
ANSA MOTORSPORTS	(Florida) Broward	7	(Canada) Fred Roberts	Am	5
ANSA MOTORSPORTS	(Florida) Orlando	30	(Canada) Antoine Comeau	PA	All
ANSA MOTORSPORTS	(Florida) Orlando	30	(United States) Nicky Hays	PA	1–5
ANSA MOTORSPORTS	(Florida) Orlando	30	(France) Nicolas Jamin	PA	6
ANSA MOTORSPORTS	(Florida) Palm Beach	94	(United States) Stephen Sorbaro	LC	1–2, 4–5
Kaizen Autosport	(North Carolina) Charlotte	11	(Lithuania) Tadas Karlinskas	PA	2–6
Kaizen Autosport	(North Carolina) Charlotte	11	(Lithuania) Darius Trinka	PA	2–6
Kaizen Autosport	(North Carolina) Charlotte	44	(United States) Wyatt Foster	PA	1–5
Kaizen Autosport	(North Carolina) Charlotte	44	(United States) Seth Henry	PA	1–5
One Motorsports	(California) Newport Beach	12	(United States) Anthony Bullock	Am	1–4
One Motorsports	(California) Newport Beach	57	(United States) Nick Groat	LC	1–2, 4–5
Flying Lizard Motorsports	(California) Newport Beach	14	(United States) Andy Lee	PA	All
Flying Lizard Motorsports	(California) Newport Beach	14	(United States) Slade Stewart	PA	All
Flying Lizard Motorsports	(California) Newport Beach	41	(United States) Paul Nemschoff	PA	All
Flying Lizard Motorsports	(California) Newport Beach	41	(United States) Marc Miller	PA	All
World Speed	(California) Walnut Creek	15	(United States) Cam Aliabadi	PA	2
World Speed	(California) Walnut Creek	15	(Italy) Dario Capitanio	PA	2
World Speed	Hawaii	22	(United States) Jaden Conwright	P	1–5
World Speed	Hawaii	22	(United States) Scott Huffaker	P	1–5
Alliance Racing	(Florida) Naples	25	(United States) Garrett Adams	Am	2, 5–6
Alliance Racing	(Florida) Naples	25	(United Kingdom) Andre Lagartixa	Am	2, 5
Alliance Racing	(Florida) Naples	25	(United States) David Hodge	Am	1
Alliance Racing	(Florida) Palm Beach	26	(United States) Garrett Adams	Am	1, 3–4
Alliance Racing	(Florida) Palm Beach	26	(United States) Robert Soroka	Am	1
Alliance Racing	(Florida) Palm Beach	26	(United States) David Hodge	Am	2
Alliance Racing	(Florida) Palm Beach	26	(United Kingdom) Andre Lagartixa	Am	3
Alliance Racing	(Florida) Palm Beach	26	(United States) Garrett Adams	PA	4
Alliance Racing	(Florida) Palm Beach	26	(United States) Avery Towns	PA	4
Alliance Racing	(Florida) Palm Beach	27	(United States) David Hodge	PA	1
Alliance Racing	(Florida) Palm Beach	27	(United States) Cole Kleck	PA	1
Alliance Racing	(Florida) Naples	28	(United States) Luke Berkeley	PA	1–2
Alliance Racing	(Florida) Naples	28	(United States) Tyler Hoffman	PA	1–2
Alliance Racing	(Florida) Naples	28	(United States) Luke Berkeley	P	3–6
Alliance Racing	(Florida) Naples	28	(United States) Ernie Francis Jr.	P	3–6
TR3 Racing	(Florida) Miami	29	(New Zealand) Will Bamber	P	All
TR3 Racing	(Florida) Miami	29	(United States) Elias De La Torre	P	All
TR3 Racing	(Florida) Miami	37	(United States) Clay Wilson	LC	1–2, 4–5
TR3 Racing	(California) Westlake	63	(United States) Mateo Siderman	Am	All
TR3 Racing	(California) Westlake	63	(United States) Michael Johnson	Am	1
TR3 Racing	(Florida) Miami	67	(United States) Conrad Geis	PA	All
TR3 Racing	(Florida) Miami	67	(United States) Jason Hart	PA	All
TR3 Racing	(Florida) Miami	70	(Canada) Dean Neuls	Am	All
TR3 Racing	(Florida) Miami	98	(United States) Sam Shi	Am	1–3, 5
TR3 Racing	(Florida) Miami	98	(Canada) Mathieu Boucher	Am	5
Rearden Racing	(Florida) Palm Beach	33	(Lithuania) Tadas Karlinskas	PA	1
Rearden Racing	(Florida) Palm Beach	33	(Lithuania) Darius Trinka	PA	1
Precision Performance Motorsports	(Florida) Palm Beach	45	(Colombia) Gabriel Holguin	Am	3–4
Precision Performance Motorsports	(Florida) Palm Beach	46	(Puerto Rico) Sebastian Carazo	Am	All
Precision Performance Motorsports	(Florida) Palm Beach	46	(United States) Sean McAuliffe	Am	3–5
Precision Performance Motorsports	(Florida) Palm Beach	46	(Colombia) Gabriel Holguin	Am	2, 6
Precision Performance Motorsports	(Florida) Palm Beach	46	(United States) Lance Bergstein	Am	1
Precision Performance Motorsports	(Florida) Palm Beach	47	(United States) Dominic Starkweather	P	1–5
Precision Performance Motorsports	(Florida) Palm Beach	47	(Puerto Rico) Bryan Ortiz	P	1–4
Precision Performance Motorsports	(Florida) Palm Beach	47	(United States) Brandon Gdovic	P	5–6
Precision Performance Motorsports	(Florida) Palm Beach	48	(United States) David Staab	Am	All
Forte Racing	(California) San Diego	49	(United States) Tom Capizzi	LC	2
Forte Racing	(California) Newport Beach	65	(United States) Ray Shahi	LC	1–2, 4–6
Forte Racing	(California) Beverly Hills	86	(United States) Jon Hirshberg	LC	2, 4, 6
Forty7 Motorsports	(Pennsylvania) Philadelphia	52	(United States) Mark Brummond	LC	1–2, 4
Forty7 Motorsports	(Connecticut) Greenwich	66	(United States) Christopher Tasca	LC	2, 4–5
Forty7 Motorsports	(Pennsylvania) Philadelphia	77	(United States) Al Morey	P	All
Forty7 Motorsports	(Pennsylvania) Philadelphia	77	(United States) Keawn Tandon	P	1–2, 4–6
Forty7 Motorsports	(Pennsylvania) Philadelphia	77	(United States) Jake Walker	P	3
Forty7 Motorsports	(Connecticut) Greenwich	88	(United States) Jackson Lee	Am	1, 3
Forty7 Motorsports	(Connecticut) Greenwich	88	(United States) Christopher Tasca	Am	1
Forty7 Motorsports	(Connecticut) Greenwich	88	(United States) Mo Dadkhah	Am	3
Forty7 Motorsports	(Connecticut) Greenwich	88	(United States) Jackson Lee	PA	2
Forty7 Motorsports	(Connecticut) Greenwich	88	(United States) AJ Muss	PA	2
Forty7 Motorsports	(Connecticut) Greenwich	88	(United States) Mo Dadkhah	PA	4
Forty7 Motorsports	(Connecticut) Greenwich	88	(Germany) Alexander Mayer	PA	4
Forty7 Motorsports	(Connecticut) Greenwich	88	(United States) Joel Miller	PA	5
Forty7 Motorsports	(Connecticut) Greenwich	88	(United States) Frank Szczesniak	PA	5

Icon	Class
P	Pro Cup
PA	Pro-Am Cup
Am	Am Cup
LC	LB Cup

== Race results ==
Bold indicates overall winner.

Round		Circuit	Pro Winner	Pro-Am Winner	Am Winner	LB Cup Winner	Report
1	R1	(Florida) Sebring International Raceway	**No. 1 Wayne Taylor Racing**	No. 69 Wayne Taylor Racing	No. 10 Wayne Taylor Racing	No. 57 One Motorsports	Report
1	R1	(Florida) Sebring International Raceway	**(Sweden) Hampus Ericsson** **(Costa Rica) Danny Formal**	(New Zealand) Brendon Leitch (United States) Anthony McIntosh	(United States) Graham Doyle (United States) Glenn McGee	(United States) Nick Groat	Report
1	R2	(Florida) Sebring International Raceway	**No. 1 Wayne Taylor Racing**	No. 33 Rearden Racing	No. 10 Wayne Taylor Racing	No. 57 One Motorsports	Report
1	R2	(Florida) Sebring International Raceway	**(Sweden) Hampus Ericsson** **(Costa Rica) Danny Formal**	(Lithuania) Tadas Karlinskas (Lithuania) Darius Trinka	(United States) Graham Doyle (United States) Glenn McGee	(United States) Nick Groat	Report
2	R1	(California) WeatherTech Raceway Laguna Seca	**No. 8 Wayne Taylor Racing**	No. 14 Flying Lizard Motorsports	No. 48 Precision Performance Motorsports	No. 57 One Motorsports	Report
2	R1	(California) WeatherTech Raceway Laguna Seca	**(United States) Nick Persing**	(United States) Andy Lee (United States) Slade Stewart	(United States) David Staab	(United States) Nick Groat	Report
2	R2	(California) WeatherTech Raceway Laguna Seca	**No. 8 Wayne Taylor Racing**	No. 69 Wayne Taylor Racing	No. 10 Wayne Taylor Racing	No. 42 MLT Motorsports	Report
2	R2	(California) WeatherTech Raceway Laguna Seca	**(United States) Nick Persing**	(New Zealand) Brendon Leitch (United States) Anthony McIntosh	(United States) Graham Doyle (United States) Glenn McGee	(United States) Adrian Kunzle	Report
3	R1	(New York (state)) Watkins Glen International	**No. 29 TR3 Racing**	No. 81 RAFA Racing Team	No. 10 Wayne Taylor Racing	No. 52 Forty7 Motorsports	Report
3	R1	(New York (state)) Watkins Glen International	**(New Zealand) Will Bamber** **(United States) Elias De La Torre**	(United States) Tyler Gonzalez (United States) Harry Gottsacker	(United States) Graham Doyle (United States) Glenn McGee	(United States) Mark Brummond	Report
3	R2	(New York (state)) Watkins Glen International	**No. 29 TR3 Racing**	No. 30 ANSA MOTORSPORTS	No. 10 Wayne Taylor Racing	No. 99 RAFA Racing Team	Report
3	R2	(New York (state)) Watkins Glen International	**(New Zealand) Will Bamber** **(United States) Elias De La Torre**	(Canada) Antoine Comeau (United States) Nicky Hays	(United States) Graham Doyle (United States) Glenn McGee	(United States) Rocky T Bolduc	Report
4	R1	(Wisconsin) Road America	**No. 1 Wayne Taylor Racing**	No. 69 Wayne Taylor Racing	No. 48 Precision Performance Motorsports	No. 57 One Motorsports	Report
4	R1	(Wisconsin) Road America	**(Sweden) Hampus Ericsson** **(Costa Rica) Danny Formal**	(United States) Jackson Lee (United States) Trent Hindman	(United States) David Staab	(United States) Nick Groat	Report
4	R2	(Wisconsin) Road America	**No. 1 Wayne Taylor Racing**	No. 67 TR3 Racing	No. 2 RAFA Racing Team	No. 57 One Motorsports	Report
4	R2	(Wisconsin) Road America	**(Sweden) Hampus Ericsson** **(Costa Rica) Danny Formal**	(United States) Conrad Geis (United States) Jason Hart	(United States) Lindsay Brewer (United Kingdom) Jem Hepworth	(United States) Nick Groat	Report
5	R1	(Indiana) Indianapolis Motor Speedway	**No. 1 Wayne Taylor Racing**	No. 69 Wayne Taylor Racing	No. 63 TR3 Racing	No. 57 One Motorsports	Report
5	R1	(Indiana) Indianapolis Motor Speedway	**(Sweden) Hampus Ericsson** **(Costa Rica) Danny Formal**	(United States) Jackson Lee (United States) Trent Hindman	(United States) Mateo Siderman	(United States) Nick Groat	Report
5	R2	(Indiana) Indianapolis Motor Speedway	**No. 1 Wayne Taylor Racing**	No. 69 Wayne Taylor Racing	No. 63 TR3 Racing	No. 57 One Motorsports	Report
5	R2	(Indiana) Indianapolis Motor Speedway	**(Sweden) Hampus Ericsson** **(Costa Rica) Danny Formal**	(United States) Jackson Lee (United States) Trent Hindman	(United States) Mateo Siderman	(United States) Nick Groat	Report
6	R1	(Italy) Misano World Circuit Marco Simoncelli	**No. 1 Wayne Taylor Racing**	No. 67 TR3 Racing	No. 63 TR3 Racing	No. 99 RAFA Racing Team	Report
6	R1	(Italy) Misano World Circuit Marco Simoncelli	**(Sweden) Hampus Ericsson** **(Costa Rica) Danny Formal**	(United States) Conrad Geis (United States) Jason Hart	(United States) Mateo Siderman	(United States) Rocky T Bolduc	Report
6	R2	(Italy) Misano World Circuit Marco Simoncelli	**No. 8 Wayne Taylor Racing**	No. 67 TR3 Racing	No. 2 RAFA Racing Team	No. 99 RAFA Racing Team	Report
6	R2	(Italy) Misano World Circuit Marco Simoncelli	**(United States) Nick Persing**	(United States) Conrad Geis (United States) Jason Hart	(United States) Lindsay Brewer (United Kingdom) Jem Hepworth	(United States) Rocky T Bolduc	Report

== Championship standings ==
=== Points system ===
Championship points are awarded in each class at the finish of each event. Points are awarded based on finishing positions in the race as shown in the chart below.

Position	1st	2nd	3rd	4th	5th	6th	7th	8th	9th	10th	Pole
Points	15	12	10	8	6	5	4	3	2	1	**1**

For the teams and dealerships championship, each team or dealership takes the points of the two highest-placing entries within class. One additional point is also awarded for each class pole position in each race.

=== Drivers' Championship ===
Pos.	Drivers	SEB (Florida)		LGA (California)		WGL (New York (state))		ELK (Wisconsin)		IMS (Indiana)		MIS (Italy)		Points
Pro
1	(Sweden) Hampus Ericsson (Costa Rica) Danny Formal	**1**	**1**	**8**	2	8	6	**1**	**1**	**1**	**1**	**1**	2	148
2	(New Zealand) Will Bamber (United States) Elias De La Torre	2	2	7	4	**1**	**1**	2	2	5	7	2	5	122
3	(United States) Nick Persing	4	6	1	**1**	3	5	5	4	3	3	6	**1**	115
4	(United States) Jaden Conwright (United States) Scott Huffaker	3	3	3	8	6	2	3	3	2	2			94
5	(France) Enzo Geraci (United States) Colin Queen	5	5	5	3	5	3	6	5	5	4	4	3	87
6	(United States) Al Morey	6	8	4	6	2	4	4	7	7	5	3	4	81
7	(United States) Keawn Tandon	6	8	4	6			4	7	7	5			61
8	(Brazil) Werner Neugebauer	8	4	2	7	7	8	7	8	8	8			47
9	(United States) Dominic Starkweather	7	7	6	5	9	9	9	6	6	9			37
10	(United States) Luke Berkeley (United States) Ernie Francis Jr.					4	7	8	9	DNS	6	5	6	33
11	(Puerto Rico) Bryan Ortiz	7	7	6	5	9	9	9	6					30
12	(United States) Cameron Lawrence	8	4	2	7									27
13	(United States) Jake Walker					2	4							20
14	(Brazil) Kiko Porto					7	8	7	8					14
15	(United States) Giano Taurino									3	3			20
16	(United States) Brandon Gdovic									6	9	7	7	15
17	(United States) Augusto Soto-Schirripa									8	8			6
Pro-Am
1	(United States) Conrad Geis (United States) Jason Hart	**7**	2	5	4	2	3	4	1	7	8	1	1	113
2	(Lithuania) Tadas Karlinskas (Lithuania) Darius Trinka	3	1	2	10	8	2	2	2	4	6	2	**3**	113
3	(United States) Marc Miller (United States) Paul Nemschoff	2	7	7	2	4	**5**	10	8	2	2	4	4	91
4	(Canada) Antoine Comeau	6	6	4	9	5	1	7	3	5	7	**3**	2	88
5	(United States) Andy Lee (United States) Slade Stewart	DNS	DNS	1	3	3	4	6	**6**	3	4	5	DNS	79
6	(United States) Nicky Hays	6	6	4	9	5	1	7	3	5	7			65
7	(United States) Jackson Lee			3	8			**1**	9	**1**	**1**			63
8	(United States) Trent Hindman							**1**	9	**1**	**1**			50
9	(United States) Wyatt Foster (United States) Seth Henry	9	3	11	6	6	8	5	4	8	5			48
10	(New Zealand) Brendon Leitch	1	8	10	**1**	**9**	**DNS**							39
11	(United States) Anthony McIntosh	1	8	10	**1**	DNS	DNS							35
12	(United States) Coby Shield (United States) Sebastian Vasan			8	5	7	6	3	10					29
13	(United States) Tyler Gonzalez (United States) Harry Gottsacker					1	7							19
14	(United States) Luke Berkeley (United States) Tyler Hoffman	5	4	9	11									16
15	(United States) Joel Miller (United States) Frank Szczesniak									6	3			15
16	(Brazil) Nicholas Monteiro (Brazil) Kiko Porto	4	**5**											15
17	(United States) AJ Muss			3	8									13
18	(United States) Cam Aliabadi (Italy) Dario Capitanio			**6**	7									10
19	(United States) Mo Dadkhah (Germany) Alexander Mayer							8	5					9
20	(United States) Garrett Adams (United States) Avery Towns							9	7					6
21	(United States) David Hodge (United States) Cole Kleck	8	9											5
Am
1	(United States) Graham Doyle (United States) Glenn McGee	**1**	1	**6**	1	1	1	7	**2**	**8**	7	**5**	2	126
2	(United States) Lindsay Brewer (United Kingdom) Jem Hepworth	6	3	3	5	2	2	2	1	6	3	2	1	124
3	(United States) David Staab	2	2	1	**6**	6	5	**1**	3	4	**2**	3	4	121
4	(United States) Mateo Siderman	11	9	5	2	3	6	4	8	1	1	1	**5**	98
5	(Canada) Dean Neuls	9	5	2	3	5	10	3	4	2	9	4	3	87
6	(Puerto Rico) Sebastian Carazo	7	7	8	4	4	3	5	5	9	8	7	6	63
7	(United States) Garrett Adams	5	8	9	8	10	9			3	4	6	7	44
8	(United States) Anthony Bullock	4	4	4	9	**8**	**8**	8	7					41
9	(Colombia) Gabriel Holguin			8	4	7	7	6	6			7	6	38
10	(United States) Sean McAuliffe					4	3	5	5	9	8			35
11	(United States) Sam Shi	8	10	7	7					5	5			24
12	(United Kingdom) Andre Lagartixa			9	8	10	9			3	4			23
13	(United States) Jackson Lee	3	**11**			9	4							21
14	(Canada) Mathieu Boucher									5	5			12
15	(United States) Christopher Tasca	3	**11**											11
16	(United States) Mo Dadkhah					9	4							10
17	(United States) Robert Soroka	5	8											9
18	(United States) Jeff Courtney (Canada) Fred Roberts									7	6			9
19	(United States) Lance Bergstein	7	7											8
20	(United States) Adrian Kunzle (United States) Kevin Madsen	10	6											6
21	(United States) Michael Johnson	11	9											2
22	(United States) David Hodge	DNS	DNS	DNS	DNS									0
LB Cup
1	(United States) Nick Groat	**1**	1	**1**	**10**	6	4	**1**	**1**	1	**1**			125
2	(United States) Rocky T Bolduc	5	3	6	2	3	1	8	6	2	2	**1**	**1**	122
3	(United States) Ray Shahi	4	6	9	3	5	6	5	3	**6**	4	2	3	88
4	(United States) Mark Brummond	2	**2**	3	7	1	3	7	DNS					68
5	(United States) Christopher Tasca			7	6	2	5	6	2	3	3			64
6	(United States) Jon Hirshberg			4	5	4	7	2	7			3	2	64
7	(United States) Stephen Sorbaro	3	4	8	8	DNS	9	3	5	4	5			56
8	(United States) Clay Wilson	6	5	10	9	7	8	4	4	5	6			48
9	(United States) Tom Capizzi			5	4	**8**	**2**							31
10	(United States) Adrian Kunzle			2	1									27
Pos.	Drivers	SEB (Florida)		LGA (California)		WGL (New York (state))		ELK (Wisconsin)		IMS (Indiana)		MIS (Italy)		Points

Colour	Result
Gold	Winner
Silver	Second place
Bronze	Third place
Green	Points classification
Blue	Non-points classification
Blue	Non-classified finish (NC)
Purple	Retired, not classified (Ret)
Red	Did not qualify (DNQ)
Red	Did not pre-qualify (DNPQ)
Black	Disqualified (DSQ)
White	Did not start (DNS)
White	Withdrew (WD)
White	Race cancelled (C)
Blank	Did not practice (DNP)
Blank	Did not arrive (DNA)
Blank	Excluded (EX)

**Bold** - Pole position

=== Teams' Championship ===
Pos.	Team	Points
1	Wayne Taylor Racing	341
2	TR3 Racing	289
3	RAFA Racing Team	269
4	Forty7 Motorsports	198
5	ANSA MOTORSPORTS	191
6	Precision Performance Motorsports	191
7	Flying Lizard Motorsports	169
8	Forte Racing	168
9	One Motorsports	166
10	MLT Motorsports	108
11	World Speed	104
12	Alliance Racing	100
13	Kaizen Autosport	61
14	Rearden Racing	25
15	Daxxon Gray with MLT Motorsports	18

=== Dealers' Championship ===
Pos.	Team	Points
1	(Florida) Palm Beach	362
2	(California) Newport Beach	285
3	(Florida) Miami	264
4	(Connecticut) Greenwich	251
5	(Texas) Austin	197
6	(Pennsylvania) Philadelphia	151
7	(North Carolina) Charlotte	113
8	(California) Westlake	98
9	Hawaii	94
10	(Florida) Broward	91
11	(Florida) Orlando	88
12	(Florida) Naples	82
13	(California) Beverly Hills	64
14	(California) San Diego	31
15	(Arizona) North Scottsdale	18
16	(California) Walnut Creek	10
