= 2026 GT3 Revival Series =

Sports car racing series edition

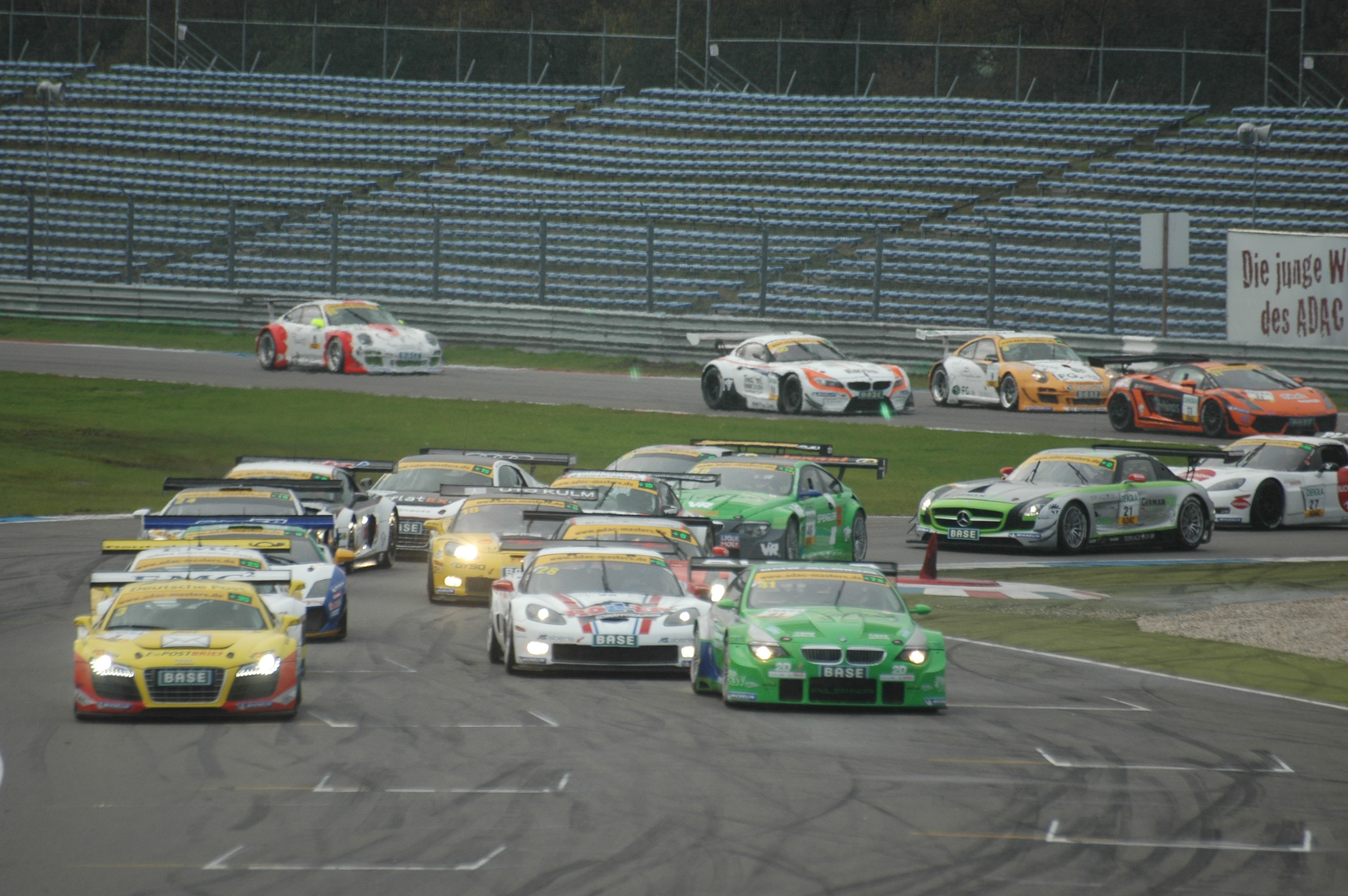
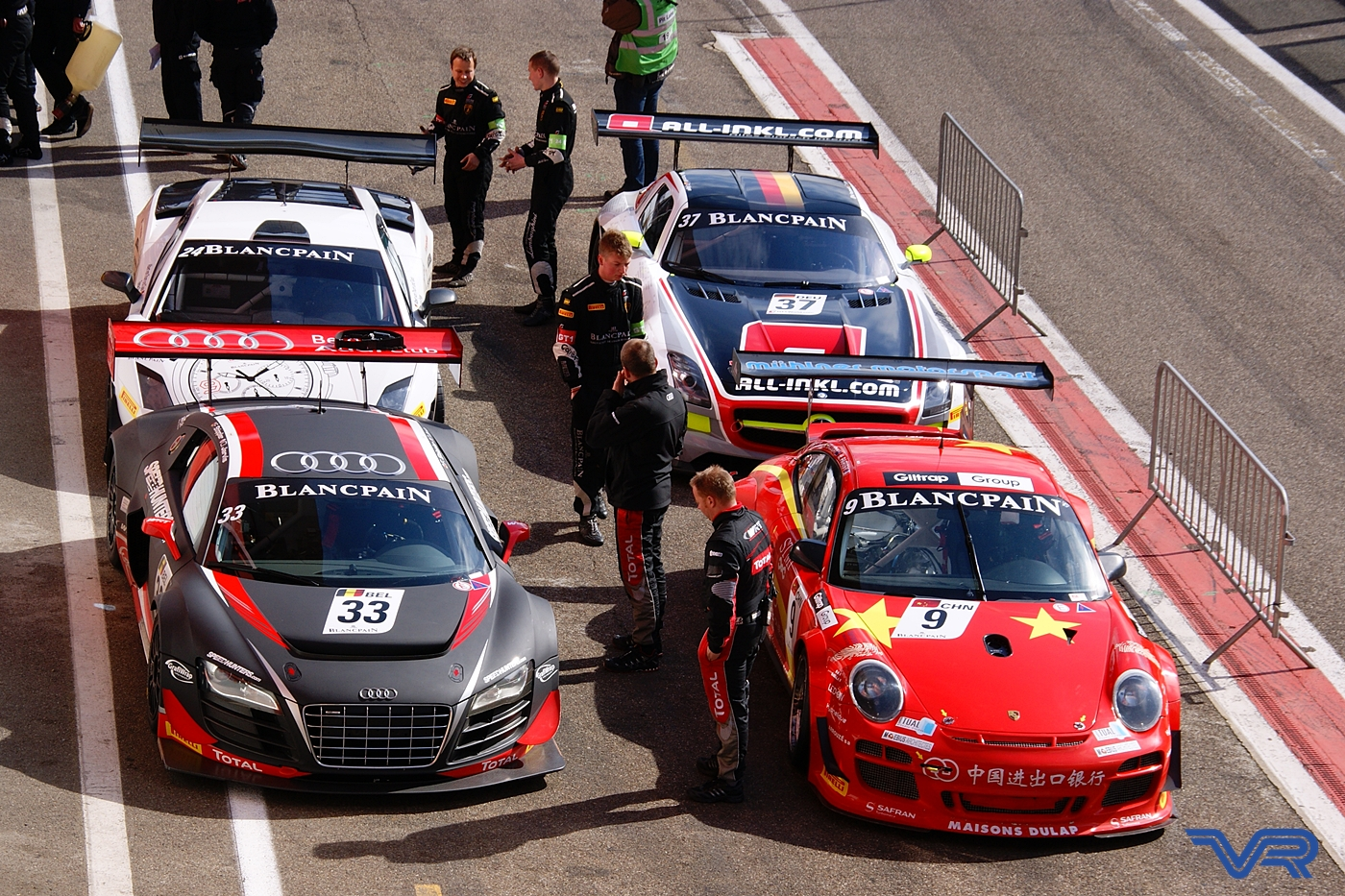
A group of cars at the TT Circuit Assen and Circuit Zolder, featuring cars that are eligible for the series

The 2026 GT3 Revival Series was the first season of the GT3 Revival Series to mark the 20th anniversary of GT3 Racing, organised by the joint partnership of Peter Auto and SRO Motorsports Group. The races were contested with GT3-spec cars that were homologated from 2006 through to 2013.

The season began on 11 April at Circuit Paul Ricard, and finished on 4 October at Circuit de Barcelona-Catalunya.

== Calendar ==
The calendar was released on 27 June 2025 at the SRO's annual 24 Hours of Spa press conference, featuring five rounds. On 29 August, the date for Round 3 at the Le Mans Classic was confirmed.

Round	Circuit	Date	Supporting	Map
1	Circuit Paul Ricard, Le Castellet, France	10–12 April	GT World Challenge Europe Endurance Cup; GT4 European Series; Lamborghini Super Trofeo Europe	2026 GT3 Revival Series is located in Europe
2	Circuit de Spa-Francorchamps, Stavelot, Belgium	22–24 May	Spa Classic	2026 GT3 Revival Series is located in Europe
3	Circuit de la Sarthe, Le Mans, France	3–5 July	Le Mans Classic	2026 GT3 Revival Series is located in Europe
4	Nürburgring, Nürburg, Germany	29–30 August	GT World Challenge Europe Endurance Cup; Lamborghini Super Trofeo Europe; Mazda MX-5 Cup	2026 GT3 Revival Series is located in Europe
5	Circuit de Barcelona-Catalunya, Montmeló, Spain	3–4 October	GT World Challenge Europe Sprint Cup; Lamborghini Super Trofeo Europe; McLaren Trophy Europe	2026 GT3 Revival Series is located in Europe

== Entry list ==
In the series, cars homologated between 2006-2009 are classified as "Gen I" and between 2010-2013 are classified as "Gen II".

Team	Car	Engine	No.	Drivers	Class		Rounds
Team	Car	Engine	No.	Drivers	Car	Driver	Rounds
(United Kingdom) Scott Sport	Aston Martin V12 Vantage GT3	Aston Martin AM11 6.0 L V12	007	(United Kingdom) Jonathan Mitchell	G2	Am	1–3
(United Kingdom) Scott Sport	Lamborghini Gallardo LP600+	Lamborghini CEH 5.2 L V10	8	(United Kingdom) Craig Wilkins	G2	Am	2–3
(United Kingdom) Scott Sport	Lamborghini Gallardo LP600+	Lamborghini CEH 5.2 L V10	24	(Canada) Keith Frieser	G2	Am	3
(United Kingdom) Scott Sport	Chevrolet Corvette Z06-R GT3	Chevrolet LS7.R 7.0 L V8	15	(United Kingdom) Dan Henrey	G1	Am	1–3
(France) TFT Racing	Audi R8 LMS Ultra	Audi CJJ 5.2 L V10	1	(United Kingdom) Nick Padmore	G2	Am	1–4
(France) TFT Racing	Audi R8 LMS Ultra	Audi CJJ 5.2 L V10	1	(Belgium) Jean-Lou Rihon	G2	Am	1–3
(Germany) Classic & Speed	Audi R8 LMS Ultra	Audi CJJ 5.2 L V10	2	(Germany) Marcus von Oeyenhausen	G2	Am	1
(Germany) Classic & Speed	Audi R8 LMS Ultra	Audi CJJ 5.2 L V10	2	(Germany) Christoph von Oeynhausen	G2	PA	2
(Germany) Classic & Speed	Audi R8 LMS Ultra	Audi CJJ 5.2 L V10	2	(Germany) Marcus von Oeyenhausen	G2	PA	2
(Germany) Classic & Speed	BMW Z4 GT3	BMW P65B44 4.4 L V8	45	(Germany) Christoph von Oeynhausen	G2	PA	3
(Germany) Classic & Speed	BMW Z4 GT3	BMW P65B44 4.4 L V8	45	(Germany) Marcus von Oeyenhausen	G2	PA	3
(Germany) Classic & Speed	BMW Z4 GT3	BMW P65B44 4.4 L V8	45	(Germany) Marcus von Oeyenhausen	G2	Am	4–5
(Germany) Classic & Speed	BMW Z4 GT3	BMW P65B44 4.4 L V8	888	(Germany) Christoph von Oeynhausen	G2	PA	1, 4–5
(France) Spark Motorsport	Audi R8 LMS	Audi CJJ 5.2 L V10	3	(France) Nicolas Doquin	G1	Am	1
(France) Spark Motorsport	Audi R8 LMS	Audi CJJ 5.2 L V10	3	(France) Hugues Ripert	G1	Am	1
(France) Spark Motorsport	Audi R8 LMS Ultra	Audi CJJ 5.2 L V10	3	(France) Nicolas Doquin	G2	Am	3
(France) Spark Motorsport	Audi R8 LMS Ultra	Audi CJJ 5.2 L V10	3	(France) Hugues Ripert	G2	Am	3
(France) Spark Motorsport	Porsche 911 GT3-R (997)	Porsche M96/79 4.0 L Flat-6	14	(France) Jean Legras	G2	Am	1, 3
(Monaco) Ortelli Racing	Audi R8 LMS	Audi CJJ 5.2 L V10	3	(Monaco) David Hallyday	G2	PA	5
(Monaco) Ortelli Racing	Audi R8 LMS	Audi CJJ 5.2 L V10	3	(Monaco) Stéphane Ortelli	G2	PA	5
(Belgium) GDM Motorsport	Aston Martin V12 Vantage GT3	Aston Martin AM11 6.0 L V12	4	(Belgium) Guido Dumarey	G2	PA	2
(Germany) Lionspeed GP	Porsche 911 GT3-R (997)	Porsche M96/79 4.0 L Flat-6	5	(Australia) David Harrison	G2	Am	2–5
(Germany) Lionspeed GP	Porsche 911 GT3-R (997)	Porsche M96/79 4.0 L Flat-6	5	(Australia) Nathan Luckey	G2	Am	2–5
(Germany) Lionspeed GP	Porsche 911 GT3-R (997)	Porsche M96/79 4.0 L Flat-6	80	(United States) José Garcia	G2	Am	All
(Germany) Lionspeed GP	Porsche 911 GT3-R (997)	Porsche M96/79 4.0 L Flat-6	80	(Netherlands) Timmo Mol	G2	Am	1, 3–5
(Germany) Lionspeed GP	Porsche 911 GT3-R (997)	Porsche M96/79 4.0 L Flat-6	80	(Spain) Steven Berndtson Ammat	G2	Am	2
(Germany) Lionspeed GP	Porsche 911 GT3-R (997)	Porsche M96/79 4.0 L Flat-6	89	(Germany) Patrick Kolb	G2	Am	2
(Germany) Lionspeed GP	Porsche 911 GT3-R (997)	Porsche M96/79 4.0 L Flat-6	89	(Germany) Uwe Kolb	G2	Am	2
(United Kingdom) Barwell Motorsport	Aston Martin DBRS9	Aston Martin AM04 6.0 L V12	6	(United States) Robert Hissom	G1	Am	3
(United Kingdom) Barwell Motorsport	Aston Martin DBRS9	Aston Martin AM04 6.0 L V12	6	(France) Stéphane Ratel	G1	Am	3
(United Kingdom) Barwell Motorsport	Lamborghini Gallardo LP560 FL2	Lamborghini CEH 5.2 L V10	78	(United Kingdom) Adam Balon	G2	PA	1
(United Kingdom) Barwell Motorsport	Lamborghini Gallardo LP560 FL2	Lamborghini CEH 5.2 L V10	78	(United Kingdom) Phil Keen	G2	PA	1
(United Kingdom) Barwell Motorsport	Lamborghini Gallardo LP560 FL2	Lamborghini CEH 5.2 L V10	78	(United Kingdom) Adam Balon	G2	Am	3
(United Kingdom) Barwell Motorsport	BMW Z4 GT3	BMW P65B44 4.4 L V8	79	(United Kingdom) Peter Moulsdale	G2	Am	1, 3
(United Kingdom) Barwell Motorsport	BMW Z4 GT3	BMW P65B44 4.4 L V8	79	(United Kingdom) Matt Topham	G2	Am	1
(France) Storic and Race Cars	Ferrari 458 Italia GT3	Ferrari F136F 4.5 L V8	10	(Switzerland) Benjamin Ricci	G2	Am	1–3, 5
(France) Storic and Race Cars	Ferrari 458 Italia GT3	Ferrari F136F 4.5 L V8	10	(Monaco) Mauro Ricci	G2	Am	2, 5
(France) Storic and Race Cars	Ferrari 458 Italia GT3	Ferrari F136F 4.5 L V8	87	(France) Jean-Luc Beaubélique	G2	PA	All
(France) Storic and Race Cars	Ferrari 458 Italia GT3	Ferrari F136F 4.5 L V8	87	(France) Jim Pla	G2	PA	1–2, 4–5
(France) Storic and Race Cars	Ferrari 458 Italia GT3	Ferrari F136F 4.5 L V8	87	(France) Jérôme Policand	G2	PA	3
(United Kingdom) Team Parker Racing	Aston Martin V12 Vantage GT3	Aston Martin AM11 6.0 L V12	13	(United Kingdom) Max Lynn	G2	Am	1
(United Kingdom) Team Parker Racing	Aston Martin V12 Vantage GT3	Aston Martin AM11 6.0 L V12	13	(United Kingdom) Shaun Lynn	G2	Am	1
(United Kingdom) Team Parker Racing	Nissan GT-R Nismo GT3	Nissan VR38DTT 3.8 L Twin Turbo V6	105	(United Kingdom) Andrew Bentley	G2	PA	2
(United Kingdom) Team Parker Racing	Nissan GT-R Nismo GT3	Nissan VR38DTT 3.8 L Twin Turbo V6	105	(United Kingdom) Max Lynn	G2	PA	2
(Germany) Britec Motorsports	Aston Martin V12 Vantage GT3	Aston Martin AM11 6.0 L V12	16	(Germany) Afschin Fatemi	G2	PA	2
(Germany) Britec Motorsports	Aston Martin V12 Vantage GT3	Aston Martin AM11 6.0 L V12	16	(United Kingdom) Phil Keen	G2	PA	2
(Germany) Britec Motorsports	Aston Martin V12 Vantage GT3	Aston Martin AM11 6.0 L V12	16	(Germany) Afschin Fatemi	G2	Am	3–5
(France) 2B Autosport	Ferrari 458 Italia GT3	Ferrari F136F 4.5 L V8	17	(France) Philippe Colançon	G2	Am	1–2
(Switzerland) Seiler Racing	Chevrolet Corvette Z06-R GT3	Chevrolet LS7.R 7.0 L V8	18	(Switzerland) Alfred Moser	G1	Am	2–3
(Switzerland) Seiler Racing	Chevrolet Corvette Z06-R GT3	Chevrolet LS7.R 7.0 L V8	18	(Switzerland) Toni Seiler	G1	Am	2–3
(Switzerland) Seiler Racing	Chevrolet Corvette Z06-R GT3	Chevrolet LS7.R 7.0 L V8	123	(Liechtenstein) Martin Wachter	G1	Am	2–3
(Switzerland) Seiler Racing	Chevrolet Corvette Z06-R GT3	Chevrolet LS7.R 7.0 L V8	123	(Switzerland) Andrè Wiget	G1	Am	2–3
(France) Debard Automobiles by Racetivity	Ford GT GT3	Ford C54SDSM 5.4 L V8	20	(France) Éric Debard	G1	Am	2–5
(France) Debard Automobiles by Racetivity	Ford GT GT3	Ford C54SDSM 5.4 L V8	20	(Switzerland) Philippe Giauque	G1	Am	1, 3
(Switzerland) Klausen Racing	Ford GT GT3	Ford C54SDSM 5.4 L V8	40	(United States) Lindsay Brewer	G2	PA	1–4
(Switzerland) Klausen Racing	Ford GT GT3	Ford C54SDSM 5.4 L V8	40	(France) Célia Martin	G2	PA	1–4
(United Kingdom) WG British Racing	Audi R8 LMS Ultra	Audi CJJ 5.2 L V10	21	(France) Pierre-Olivier Calendini	G2	Am	2–3
(United Kingdom) WG British Racing	Audi R8 LMS Ultra	Audi CJJ 5.2 L V10	21	(France) Guillaume Maillard	G2	Am	2–3
(France) Saintéloc Racing	Audi R8 LMS Ultra	Audi CJJ 5.2 L V10	25	(France) Daniel Desbruères	G2	Am	1, 3–5
(France) Saintéloc Racing	Audi R8 LMS Ultra	Audi CJJ 5.2 L V10	25	(France) Philippe Gache	G2	Am	1, 3
(France) Nourry Compétition	Porsche 911 GT3-R (997)	Porsche M96/79 4.0 L Flat-6	27	(France) Anne-Sophie Nourry	G2	Am	1, 3
(France) Nourry Compétition	Porsche 911 GT3-R (997)	Porsche M96/79 4.0 L Flat-6	27	(France) Michel Nourry	G2	Am	3
(France) Caumes Armatures Bourgoin	Porsche 911 GT3-R (997)	Porsche M96/79 4.0 L Flat-6	28	(France) Emil Caumes	G2	Am	1
(France) Caumes Armatures Bourgoin	Porsche 911 GT3-R (997)	Porsche M96/79 4.0 L Flat-6	28	(France) Jacques Caumes	G2	Am	1
(France) CMR	BMW Z4 GT3	BMW P65B44 4.4 L V8	30	(Switzerland) Pierre Hirschi	G2	Am	1, 3
(France) CMR	BMW Z4 GT3	BMW P65B44 4.4 L V8	30	(Switzerland) Pierre Hirschi	G2	PA	4
(France) CMR	Ferrari 458 Italia GT3	Ferrari F136F 4.5 L V8	43	(France) Gregory Driot	G2	Am	2
(France) Équipe Europe	Audi R8 LMS Ultra	Audi CJJ 5.2 L V10	35	(France) Armand Mille	G2	PA	2
(France) Équipe Europe	Audi R8 LMS Ultra	Audi CJJ 5.2 L V10	64	(France) Pierre Thiriet	G2	PA	2
(France) Équipe Europe	Ferrari 458 Italia GT3 GTD	Ferrari F136F 4.5 L V8	556	Erwin France	IV		2–3
(France) Équipe Europe	Ferrari 458 Italia GT3 GTD	Ferrari F136F 4.5 L V8	556	Pierre-Alain France	IV		2–3
Twin Busch Germany	Mercedes-Benz SLS AMG GT3	Mercedes-Benz M159 6.2 L V8	44	(Germany) Dennis Busch	G2	Am	2
Twin Busch Germany	Mercedes-Benz SLS AMG GT3	Mercedes-Benz M159 6.2 L V8	44	(Germany) Marc Busch	G2	Am	2
(United Kingdom) Crowne Racing	Audi R8 LMS Ultra	Audi CJJ 5.2 L V10	45	(United Kingdom) Tony Sinclair	G2	Am	1
(United Kingdom) Crowne Racing	Audi R8 LMS Ultra	Audi CJJ 5.2 L V10	45	(United Kingdom) Stuart Hall	G2	PA	2
(United Kingdom) Crowne Racing	Audi R8 LMS Ultra	Audi CJJ 5.2 L V10	45	(United Kingdom) Sam Yates	G2	PA	2
(United Kingdom) Pyro Motorsport	Audi R8 LMS Blancpain Endurance	Audi CJJ 5.2 L V10	46	(United Kingdom) Jeff Smith	G2	Am	3–5
(United Kingdom) Quinntech Racing	Audi R8 LMS Ultra	Audi CJJ 5.2 L V10	47	(United Kingdom) Mark Cole	G2	PA	All
(United Kingdom) Quinntech Racing	Audi R8 LMS Ultra	Audi CJJ 5.2 L V10	47	(Portugal) Álvaro Parente	G2	PA	All
(France) SRO Race Center	Ferrari 458 Italia GT3	Ferrari F136F 4.5 L V8	49	(Italy) Mario Cordoni	G2	Am	2, 5
(United Kingdom) Espace Racing	Ferrari F430 GT3	Ferrari F136E 4.3 L V8	50	(France) Olivier Lopez	G1	Am	1
(United Kingdom) Espace Racing	Ferrari F430 GT3	Ferrari F136E 4.3 L V8	50	(France) Christian Philippon	G1	Am	1
(United Kingdom) Espace Racing	Mercedes-Benz SLS AMG GT3	Mercedes-Benz M159 6.2 L V8	50	(France) Franck Labescat	G2	Am	3
(United Kingdom) Espace Racing	Mercedes-Benz SLS AMG GT3	Mercedes-Benz M159 6.2 L V8	50	(France) Christian Philippon	G2	Am	3
(Italy) Michelotto	Ferrari 458 Italia GT3	Ferrari F136F 4.5 L V8	52	(Austria) Stephan Joebstl	G2	PA	1–4
(Italy) Michelotto	Ferrari 458 Italia GT3	Ferrari F136F 4.5 L V8	52	(United Kingdom) William Nuthall	G2	PA	1, 3–4
(Italy) Michelotto	Ferrari 458 Italia GT3	Ferrari F136F 4.5 L V8	52	(Germany) Thomas Mutsch	G2	PA	2
(Germany) Speed Motorsports Management	Audi R8 LMS Ultra	Audi CJJ 5.2 L V10	58	(United Kingdom) Geoff Isringhausen	G2	Am	1–3
(Germany) Speed Motorsports Management	Porsche 911 GT3-R (997)	Porsche M96/79 4.0 L Flat-6	911	(Germany) Christian Kuhn	G2	Am	1–3
(Germany) Schmickler Performance	Ferrari 458 Italia GT3	Ferrari F136F 4.5 L V8	60	(Germany) Horst Baumann	G2	Am	4
(France) Fanta Racing Legend by Code Classic	Aston Martin V12 Vantage GT3	Aston Martin AM11 6.0 L V12	62	(France) Pascal Huteau	G2	Am	1–3, 5
(France) Fanta Racing Legend by Code Classic	Aston Martin V12 Vantage GT3	Aston Martin AM11 6.0 L V12	62	(Germany) Franz Wunderlich	G2	Am	1–3
(Germany) Team Motopark	Mercedes-Benz SLS AMG GT3	Mercedes-Benz M159 6.2 L V8	65	(Germany) Heiko Neumann	G2	Am	All
(Germany) Motohistorics	Mercedes-Benz SLS AMG GT3	Mercedes-Benz M159 6.2 L V8	69	(United Kingdom) Rob Huff	G2	PA	2
(Germany) Motohistorics	Mercedes-Benz SLS AMG GT3	Mercedes-Benz M159 6.2 L V8	69	(Hong Kong) Philip Kadoorie	G2	PA	2
(France) Schumacher - IMSA Performance	Porsche 911 GT3-R (997)	Porsche M96/79 4.0 L Flat-6	76	(France) Michel Ettouati	G2	Am	2–3
(United Kingdom) Jordan Racing Team	McLaren MP4-12C GT3	McLaren M838T 3.8 L Turbo V8	77	(United Kingdom) Matthew Holme	G2	Am	2–3
(United Kingdom) Jordan Racing Team	McLaren MP4-12C GT3	McLaren M838T 3.8 L Turbo V8	77	(United Kingdom) Andrew Jamieson	G2	Am	2–3
(United States) Era Motorsport	Aston Martin V12 Vantage GT3	Aston Martin AM11 6.0 L V12	82	(Germany) Christian Albrecht	G2	PA	2
(United States) Era Motorsport	Aston Martin V12 Vantage GT3	Aston Martin AM11 6.0 L V12	82	(United Kingdom) Kyle Tilley	G2	PA	2
(United Kingdom) Pursuit Racing	Audi R8 LMS	Audi CJJ 5.2 L V10	88	(United Kingdom) Christoff Cowens	G2	Am	5
(United Kingdom) Pursuit Racing	Audi R8 LMS	Audi CJJ 5.2 L V10	88	(United Kingdom) Harvey Stanley	G2	Am	5
(United Kingdom) Anderson Racing Team	Lamborghini Gallardo LP600+	Lamborghini CEH 5.2 L V10	90	(United Kingdom) Marcus Anderson	G2	Am	2–3, 5
(Japan) Endless Sports	Porsche 911 GT3-R (997)	Porsche M96/79 4.0 L Flat-6	91	(Australia) Duncan Mackellar	G2	Am	2
(Japan) Endless Sports	Porsche 911 GT3-R (997)	Porsche M96/79 4.0 L Flat-6	91	(Australia) Duncan Mackellar	G2	PA	3
(Japan) Endless Sports	Porsche 911 GT3-R (997)	Porsche M96/79 4.0 L Flat-6	91	(United Kingdom) Phil Quaife	G2	PA	3
(Italy) Pastorelli Classics Cars	Ferrari 458 Italia GT3	Ferrari F136F 4.5 L V8	92	(United Kingdom) Joe Macari	G2	Am	2
(Italy) Pastorelli Classics Cars	Ferrari 458 Italia GT3	Ferrari F136F 4.5 L V8	92	(United Kingdom) Dario Franchitti	G2	PA	3
(Italy) Pastorelli Classics Cars	Ferrari 458 Italia GT3	Ferrari F136F 4.5 L V8	92	(United Kingdom) Joe Macari	G2	PA	3
(Hungary) GFS Racing	Aston Martin V12 Vantage GT3	Aston Martin AM11 6.0 L V12	94	(Hungary) János Sánta	G2	Am	1, 3
(New Zealand) Marketing South	Porsche 911 Cup S (997)	Porsche M96/75 3.6 L Flat-6	96	(New Zealand) Allan Dippie	G1	Am	2
(New Zealand) Marketing South	Porsche 911 GT3-R (997)	Porsche M96/79 4.0 L Flat-6	97	(Australia) Scott O'Donnell	G2	Am	2–3, 5
(New Zealand) Marketing South	Porsche 911 GT3-R (997)	Porsche M96/79 4.0 L Flat-6	97	(New Zealand) Allan Dippie	G2	Am	5
(Switzerland) Endurance Swiss	Porsche 911 GT3-R (997)	Porsche M96/79 4.0 L Flat-6	311	(Germany) Heiko Scharnhorst	IV		2
(United Kingdom) Maxted-Page Motorsport	Porsche 911 GT3-R (997)	Porsche M96/79 4.0 L Flat-6	997	(Switzerland) Jürg Aeberhard	G2	PA	2
(United Kingdom) Maxted-Page Motorsport	Porsche 911 GT3-R (997)	Porsche M96/79 4.0 L Flat-6	997	(United Kingdom) Lee Maxted-Page	G2	PA	2
(United Kingdom) Maxted-Page Motorsport	Porsche 911 GT3-R (997)	Porsche M96/79 4.0 L Flat-6	997	(United Kingdom) Lee Maxted-Page	G2	Am	3

Icon	Class
Cars
G1	Gen 1
G2	Gen 2
IV	Invitational
Drivers
PA	Pro-Am Cup
Am	Am Cup

== Race results ==
Bold indicates overall winner.

Round		Circuit	Pole Position	Pro-Am Winners	Am Winners	Report
1	R1	(France) Paul Ricard	(France) No. 10 Storic and Race Cars	**(France) No. 87 Storic and Race Cars**	(France) No. 10 Storic and Race Cars	Report
1	R1	(France) Paul Ricard	(Switzerland) Benjamin Ricci	**(France) Jean-Luc Beaubélique** **(France) Jim Pla**	(Switzerland) Benjamin Ricci	Report
1	R2	(France) Paul Ricard	(France) No. 87 Storic and Race Cars	(France) No. 87 Storic and Race Cars	**(France) No. 10 Storic and Race Cars**	Report
1	R2	(France) Paul Ricard	(France) Jean-Luc Beaubélique (France) Jim Pla	(France) Jean-Luc Beaubélique (France) Jim Pla	**(Switzerland) Benjamin Ricci**	Report
2	R1	(Belgium) Spa-Francorchamps	(United Kingdom) No. 7 Scott Sport	**(Belgium) No. 4 GDM Motorsport**	(United Kingdom) No. 7 Scott Sport	Report
2	R1	(Belgium) Spa-Francorchamps	(United Kingdom) Jonathan Mitchell	**(Belgium) Guido Dumarey**	(United Kingdom) Jonathan Mitchell	Report
2	R2	(Belgium) Spa-Francorchamps	(France) No. 87 Storic and Race Cars	**(France) No. 87 Storic and Race Cars**	(United Kingdom) No. 7 Scott Sport	Report
2	R2	(Belgium) Spa-Francorchamps	(France) Jean-Luc Beaubélique (France) Jim Pla	**(France) Jean-Luc Beaubélique** **(France) Jim Pla**	(United Kingdom) Jonathan Mitchell	Report
3	R1	(France) Le Mans	(France) No. 87 Storic and Race Cars	(France) No. 87 Storic and Race Cars	**(France) No. 10 Storic and Race Cars**	Report
3	R1	(France) Le Mans	(France) Jean-Luc Beaubélique (France) Jerome Policand	(France) Jean-Luc Beaubélique (France) Jerome Policand	**(Switzerland) Benjamin Ricci**	Report
3	R2	(France) Le Mans	(Austria) No. 65 Team Motopark	(France) No. 87 Storic and Race Cars	**(United Kingdom) No. 7 Scott Sport**	Report
3	R2	(France) Le Mans	(Germany) Heiko Neumann	(France) Jean-Luc Beaubélique (France) Jerome Policand	**(United Kingdom) Jonathan Mitchell**	Report
4	R1	(Germany) Nürburgring	(Germany) No. 888 Classic & Speed	**(Germany) No. 888 Classic & Speed**	(Austria) No. 65 Team Motopark	Report
4	R1	(Germany) Nürburgring	(Germany) Christoph von Oeynhausen	**(Germany) Christoph von Oeynhausen**	(Germany) Heiko Neumann	Report
4	R2	(Germany) Nürburgring	(France) No. 87 Storic and Race Cars	**(Germany) No. 888 Classic & Speed**	(France) No. 1 TFT Racing	Report
4	R2	(Germany) Nürburgring	(France) Jean-Luc Beaubélique (France) Jim Pla	**(Germany) Christoph von Oeynhausen**	(United Kingdom) Nick Padmore	Report
5	R1	(Spain) Barcelona	(France) No. 62 Fanta Racing Legend by Code Classic	(United Kingdom) No. 47 Quinntech Racing	(France) **No. 62 Fanta Racing Legend by Code Classic**	Report
5	R1	(Spain) Barcelona	(France) Pascal Huteau	(United Kingdom) Mark Cole (Portugal) Álvaro Parente	(France) **Pascal Huteau**	Report
5	R2	(Spain) Barcelona	(United Kingdom) No. 47 Quinntech Racing	(Germany) No. 888 Classic & Speed	(Austria) **No. 65 Team Motopark**	Report
5	R2	(Spain) Barcelona	(United Kingdom) Mark Cole (Portugal) Álvaro Parente	(Germany) Christoph von Oeynhausen	**(Germany) Heiko Neumann**	Report

== Championship standings ==
Scoring system

Championship points are awarded for the first ten positions in each race. The pole-sitter also receives one point.

Position	1st	2nd	3rd	4th	5th	6th	7th	8th	9th	10th	Pole
Points	25	18	15	12	10	8	6	4	2	1	1

=== Pro-Am drivers' standings ===
Pos.	Drivers	Team	LEC (France)		SPA* (Belgium)		LMS (France)		NÜR (Germany)		CAT* (Spain)		Points
1	(France) Jean-Luc Beaubélique	(France) Storic and Race Cars	1^{P}	1^{P}	5	1^{P}	1^{P}	1	Ret	2^{P}	4^{P}	DNS	159
2	(Germany) Christoph von Oeynhausen	(Germany) Classic & Speed	6	2	4	Ret	Ret	3	1^{P}	1	2	1	132
3	(United Kingdom) Mark Cole (Portugal) Álvaro Parente	(Luxembourg) Leopard Racing Team Quinntech	3	3	7	5	Ret	DNS^{P}	2	3	1	2^{P}	108.5
4	(France) Jim Pla	(France) Storic and Race Cars	1^{P}	1^{P}	5	1^{P}			Ret	2^{P}	4^{P}	DNS	108
5	(Austria) Stephan Joebstl	(Italy) Michelotto	4	4	9	7	Ret	2	3	Ret			64
6	(United Kingdom) William Nuthall	(Italy) Michelotto	4	4			Ret	2	3	Ret			57
7	(France) Jérôme Policand	(France) Storic and Race Cars					1^{P}	1					51
8	(United States) Lindsay Brewer (France) Célia Martin	(Switzerland) Klausen Racing	5	6	8	9	Ret	DNS	Ret	4			34
9	(United Kingdom) Phil Keen	(United Kingdom) Barwell Motorsport	2	5									32
9	(United Kingdom) Phil Keen	(Germany) Britec Motorsports			11	8							32
10	(United Kingdom) Adam Balon	(United Kingdom) Barwell Motorsport	2	5									28
11	(United Kingdom) Andrew Bentley (United Kingdom) Max Lynn	(United Kingdom) Team Parker Racing			2	2							27
12	(Belgium) Guido Dumarey	(Belgium) GDM Motorsport			1^{P}	4							25.5
13	(United Kingdom) Rob Huff (Hong Kong) Philip Kadoorie	(Germany) Motohistorics			3	3							22.5
14	(Monaco) David Hallyday (Monaco) Stéphane Ortelli	(Monaco) Ortelli Racing									3	3	22.5
15	(Germany) Marcus von Oeynhausen	(Germany) Classic & Speed			4	Ret	Ret	3					21
16	(Switzerland) Jürg Aeberhard	(United Kingdom) Maxted-Page Motorsport			10	6							8.5
17	(Germany) Thomas Mutsch	(Italy) Michelotto			9	7							7
18	(United Kingdom) Stuart Hall (United Kingdom) Sam Yates	(United Kingdom) Crowne Racing			5	10							6
19	(Germany) Afschin Fatemi	(Germany) Britec Motorsports			11	8							4
20	(United Kingdom) Lee Maxted-Page	(United Kingdom) Maxted-Page Motorsport			10	DNS							0.5
–	(France) Pierre Thiriet	(France) Équipe Europe			12	DNS							0
–	(France) Armand Mille	(France) Équipe Europe			13	DNS							0
–	(United Kingdom) Dario Franchitti (United Kingdom) Joe Macari	(Italy) Pastorelli Classics Cars					Ret	DNS					0
–	(Australia) Duncan Mackellar (United Kingdom) Phil Quaife	(Japan) Endless Sports					Ret	DNS					0
-	(Germany) Christian Albrecht (United Kingdom) Kyle Tilley	(United States) Era Motorsport			DNS	DNS							0
Pos.	Drivers	Team	LEC (France)		SPA (Belgium)		LMS (France)		NÜR (Germany)		CAT (Spain)		Points

Key
Colour	Result
Gold	Race winner
Silver	2nd place
Bronze	3rd place
Green	Points finish
Blue	Non-points finish
Blue	Non-classified finish (NC)
Purple	Did not finish (Ret)
Black	Disqualified (DSQ)
Black	Excluded (EX)
White	Did not start (DNS)
White	Race cancelled (C)
White	Withdrew (WD)
Blank	Did not participate

^{P} – Pole

Notes:

- * – Half points were awarded at both Race 1 in Spa and Race 1 in Barcelona. On both occasions red flags meant these races ran to less than 50% of their scheduled duration.

=== Am Gen 1 drivers' standings ===
Pos.	Drivers	Team	LEC (France)		SPA* (Belgium)		LMS (France)		NÜR (Germany)		CAT* (Spain)		Points
1	(France) Éric Debard	(France) Debard Automobiles by Racetivity			1^{P}	1^{P}	1^{P}	1^{P}	1^{P}	1^{P}	1^{P}	DNS^{P}	158
2	(Switzerland) Philippe Giauque	(France) Debard Automobiles by Racetivity	1^{P}	1^{P}			1^{P}	1^{P}					104
3	(United Kingdom) Dan Henrey	(United Kingdom) Scott Sport	2	2	2	2	3	Ret					78
4	(Liechtenstein) Martin Wachter (Switzerland) André Wiget	(Switzerland) Seiler Racing			3	4	4	3					46.5
5	(Switzerland) Alfred Moser (Switzerland) Toni Seiler	(Switzerland) Seiler Racing			4	3	5	4					43
6	(United States) Robert Hissom (France) Stéphane Ratel	(United Kingdom) Barwell Motorsport					2	2					36
7	(France) Olivier Lopez (France) Christian Philippon	(United Kingdom) Espace Racing	3	Ret									15
–	(New Zealand) Alan Dippie	(New Zealand) Marketing South			DNS	DNS							0
Pos.	Drivers	Team	LEC (France)		SPA (Belgium)		LMS (France)		NÜR (Germany)		CAT (Spain)		Points

Notes:

- * – Half points were awarded at both Race 1 in Spa and Race 1 in Barcelona. On both occasions red flags meant these races ran to less than 50% of their scheduled duration.

=== Am Gen 2 drivers' standings ===
Pos.	Drivers	Team	LEC (France)		SPA* (Belgium)		LMS (France)		NÜR (Germany)		CAT* (Spain)		Points
1	(Germany) Heiko Neumann	(Austria) Team Motopark	3	3	2	Ret	2^{P}	2^{P}	1	2	3	1	152.5
2	(United Kingdom) Jonathan Mitchell	(United Kingdom) Scott Sport	2	2	1^{P}	1^{P}	3	1					115.5
3	(Switzerland) Benjamin Ricci	(France) Storic and Race Cars	1^{P}	1^{P}	6	3	1	3			9	DNS^{P}	113
4	(Australia) David Harrison (Australia) Nathan Luckey	(Germany) Lionspeed GP			3	4	9	7	6	6	5	3	63.5
5	(United Kingdom) Nick Padmore	(France) TFT Racing	9	8			7	Ret	2^{P}	1^{P}			57
6	(France) Pascal Huteau	(France) Fanta Racing Legend by Code Classic	5	6	5	2	Ret	Ret			1^{P}	DNS	54.5
7	(United Kingdom) Peter Moulsdale	(United Kingdom) Barwell Motorsport	6	4			4	4					44
8	(Germany) Franz Wunderlich	(France) Fanta Racing Legend by Code Classic	5	6	5	2	Ret	Ret					41
9	(Germany) Afschin Fatemi	(Germany) Britec Motorsports					8	5	4	7	DNS	7	38
10	(Italy) Mario Cordoni	(France) SRO Race Center			DNS	5					2	2	37
11	(Australia) Scott O'Donnell	(New Zealand) Marketing South			7	6	10	8			8	4	30
12	(Germany) Horst Baumann	(Germany) Schmickler Performance							3	4			27
13	(France) Philippe Colançon	(France) 2B Autosport	4	5	10	8							26.5
14	(United Kingdom) Jeff Smith	(United Kingdom) Pyro Motorsport					Ret	DNS	5	3	Ret	DNS	25
15	(United States) José Garcia	(Germany) Lionspeed GP	15	15	4	7	16	17	10	9	10	6	23.5
16	(Monaco) Mauro Ricci	(France) Storic and Race Cars			6	3					9	DNS^{P}	21
17	(United Kingdom) Matt Topham	(United Kingdom) Barwell Motorsport	6	4									20
18	(United Kingdom) Lee Maxted-Page	(United Kingdom) Maxted-Page Motorsport					5	6					18
19	(Germany) Marcus von Oeyenhausen	(Germany) Classic & Speed	12	11					9	5	7	DNS	15
20	(Spain) Steven Berndtson Ammat	(Germany) Lionspeed GP			4	7							12
21	(United Kingdom) Christoff Cowens (United Kingdom) Harvey Stanley	(United Kingdom) Pursuit Racing									6	5	14
22	(United Kingdom) Shaun Lynn	(United Kingdom) Team Parker Racing	7	7									12
23	(New Zealand) Allan Dippie	(New Zealand) Marketing South									8	4	14
24	(United Kingdom) Jean-Lou Rihon	(France) TFT Racing	9	8			7	Ret					12
25	(Netherlands) Timmo Mol	(Germany) Lionspeed GP	15	15			16	17	10	9	10	6	11.5
26	(France) Daniel Desbruères	(France) Saintéloc Racing	10	13			13	14	8	8			9
27	(United Kingdom) Marcus Anderson	(United Kingdom) Anderson Racing Team			9	10	Ret	12	4				8
28	(United Kingdom) Adam Balon	(United Kingdom) Barwell Motorsport					6	Ret					8
29	(Switzerland) Pierre Hirschi	(France) CMR	11	10			18	DNS	7	10			8
30	(Hungary) János Sánta	(Hungary) GFS Racing	8	9			Ret	10					7
31	(United Kingdom) Geoff Isringhausen	(Germany) Speed Motorsports Management	Ret	12	8	9	11	18					4
32	(France) Michel Ettouati	(France) Schumacher - IMSA Performance			11	Ret	Ret	9					2
33	(France) Philippe Gache	(France) Saintéloc Racing	10	13			13	14					1
–	(Germany) Christian Kuhn	(Germany) Speed Motorsports Management	16	Ret	12	11	15	20					0
–	(France) Franck Labescat (France) Christian Philippon	(United Kingdom) Espace Racing					Ret	11					0
–	(France) Pierre-Olivier Calendini (France) Guillaume Maillard	(United Kingdom) WG British Racing			13	12	19	19					0
–	(Canada) Keith Frieser	(United Kingdom) Scott Sport					12	Ret					0
–	(France) Jean Legras	(France) Spark Motorsport	19	14			14	13					0
–	(France) Anne-Sophie Nourry	(France) Nourry Compétition	13	DNS			Ret	15					0
–	(France) Emil Caumes (France) Jacques Caumes	(France) Caumes Armatures Bourgoin	14	16									0
–	(Australia) Duncan Mackellar	(Japan) Endless Sports			14	DNS							0
–	(United Kingdom) Craig Wilkins	(United Kingdom) Scott Sport			15	Ret	Ret	DNS					0
–	(France) Michel Nourry	(France) Nourry Compétition					Ret	15					0
–	(France) Nicolas Coquin (France) Huges Ripert	(France) Spark Motorsport	18	Ret			20	16					0
–	(United Kingdom) Matthew Holme (United Kingdom) Andrew Jamieson	(United Kingdom) Jordan Racing Team			DNS	DNS	17	Ret					0
–	(France) Olivier Lopez (France) Christian Philippon	(United Kingdom) Espace Racing	17	Ret									0
–	(Germany) Dennis Busch (Germany) Marc Busch	(Germany) Twin-Busch Motorsport			DNS	DNS							0
Pos.	Drivers	Team	LEC (France)		SPA (Belgium)		LMS (France)		NÜR (Germany)		CAT (Spain)		Points

Notes:

- * – Half points were awarded at both Race 1 in Spa and Race 1 in Barcelona. On both occasions red flags meant these races ran to less than 50% of their scheduled duration.

== See also ==
- 2026 British GT Championship
- 2026 GT World Challenge Europe
- 2026 GT World Challenge Europe Endurance Cup
- 2026 GT World Challenge Europe Sprint Cup
- 2026 Legends of Le Mans Series
- 2026 MRL GT3 Legends Series
