= Lindsay Brewer =

American model and racing driver (born 1997)

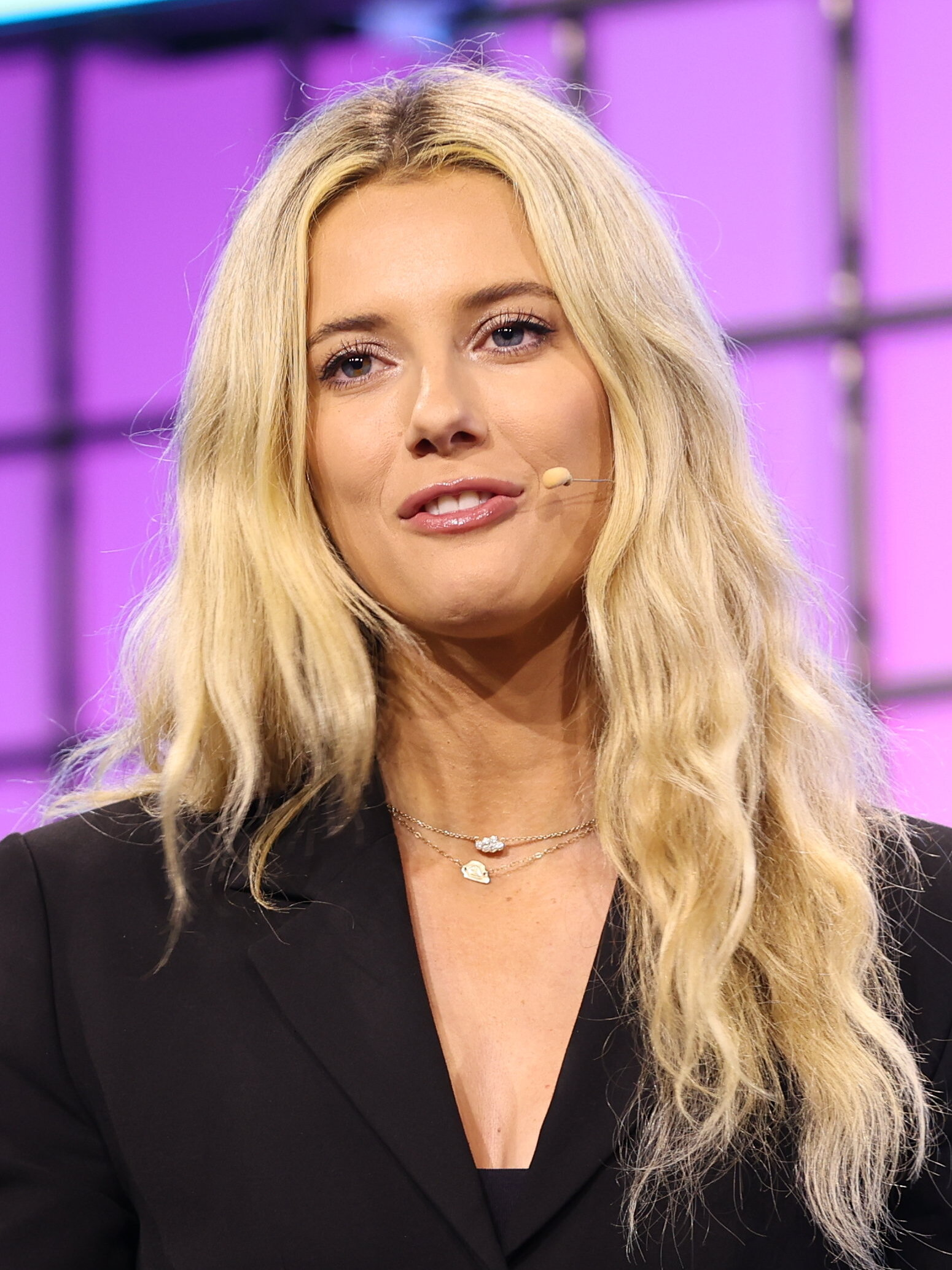
- Brewer in 2025
- Nationality: (United States) American
- Born: Lindsay Marie Brewer; April 17, 1997 (age 29); Arvada, Colorado, United States

Lamborghini Super Trofeo career
- Debut season: 2025
- Current team: 47Motorsports
- Categorisation: FIA Silver (until 2026); FIA Bronze (2027–)
- Car number: 2
- Starts: 51
- Championships: 0
- Wins: 2
- Podiums: 11
- Poles: 0
- Fastest laps: 0
- Best finish: 1st in 2025 AM class

Previous series
- 2025-26 2024 2022–23 2021: Lamborghini Super Trofeo; Indy NXT; USF Pro 2000 Championship; TC America Series

Lindsay Marie Brewer (born April 17, 1997) is an American model and racing driver. She currently competes in Lamborghini Super Trofeo North America for 47Motorsports, and in the GT3 Revival Series for Klausen Racing.

== Early life and education ==
Brewer was born in Arvada, Colorado. When she was eleven years old, she raced a go-kart at a friend's birthday party and became interested in the sport. From 2009 until 2014, Brewer competed in a variety of karting championships across the United States. She graduated from San Diego State University in 2019 with a degree in business management.

== Racing career ==
=== Saleen S1 Cup ===
After a four year hiatus for college, in 2019, Brewer competed in the Las Vegas Saleen Cup GT Series for the season finale.

=== W Series ===
Ahead of the 2022 W Series season, Brewer was selected to test for a drive in the series. The test took place at Inde Motorsports Park in Arizona where she placed top three lap times in her group and was selected as the top-twelve drivers. She was not offered a drive in the series.

=== USF Pro 2000 ===
Brewer eventually elected to join the IndyPro 2000 series as a rookie for 2022 season with Exclusive Autosport, as she wanted to compete in Open Wheel and in the coed series rather than in an all female series. Brewer first raced in the series at Indianapolis, scoring an 8th place finish in her first race. At Road America, Brewer was involved in an incident where her car was launched into the air by a kerb at turn 5, an identical incident happening on the same weekend for Christian Bogle in the Indy Lights series. Brewer finished the 2022 season in fifteenth place with 98 points and a best finish of eighth at Indianapolis. In October, Brewer confirmed she would return to race for Exclusive Autosport in the 2023 season, the inaugural year of its new title USF Pro 2000. Brewer finished the season in eighteenth place, finishing no race higher than eleventh all season.

=== Indy NXT ===
Brewer stepped up to Indy NXT full-time in 2024, competing for Juncos Hollinger Racing in the No. 76 after mediocre results in the USF Pro Series. She is the first American female to race in the series since Leilani Munter in 2007. Brewer's 2024 campaign is heavily backed by sponsors Gtechniq and C4 Energy. In her first race at St Pete, she scored a top-fifteen finish. However, she would only score a nineteenth place finish in the following race at Barber Motorsports Park, albeit finishing ahead of fellow female racer Jamie Chadwick. Prior to the race, Brewer noted she faced challenges with the physical nature of the circuit. Brewer finished in sixteenth place at Road America the last finisher on the lead lap, taking her season points total to 74. Ahead of the Milwaukee oval races later in the season, Brewer took part in the Indy NXT open test on the Milwaukee Mile in June. She finished eighteenth fastest overall and clocked 151 laps. Days later, Brewer and her team Juncos Hollinger Racing signed a sponsorship agreement with the Old Milwaukee Non-Alcoholic near-beer brand. Brewer reached mid-season with a two race weekend at Laguna Seca in the Grand Prix of Monterey. She finished seventeenth in the first race, and was involved in a final lap incident with Yuven Sundaramoorthy, who was running third and attempting to lap Brewer when the pair made contact. In race two, Brewer finished in 15th position.

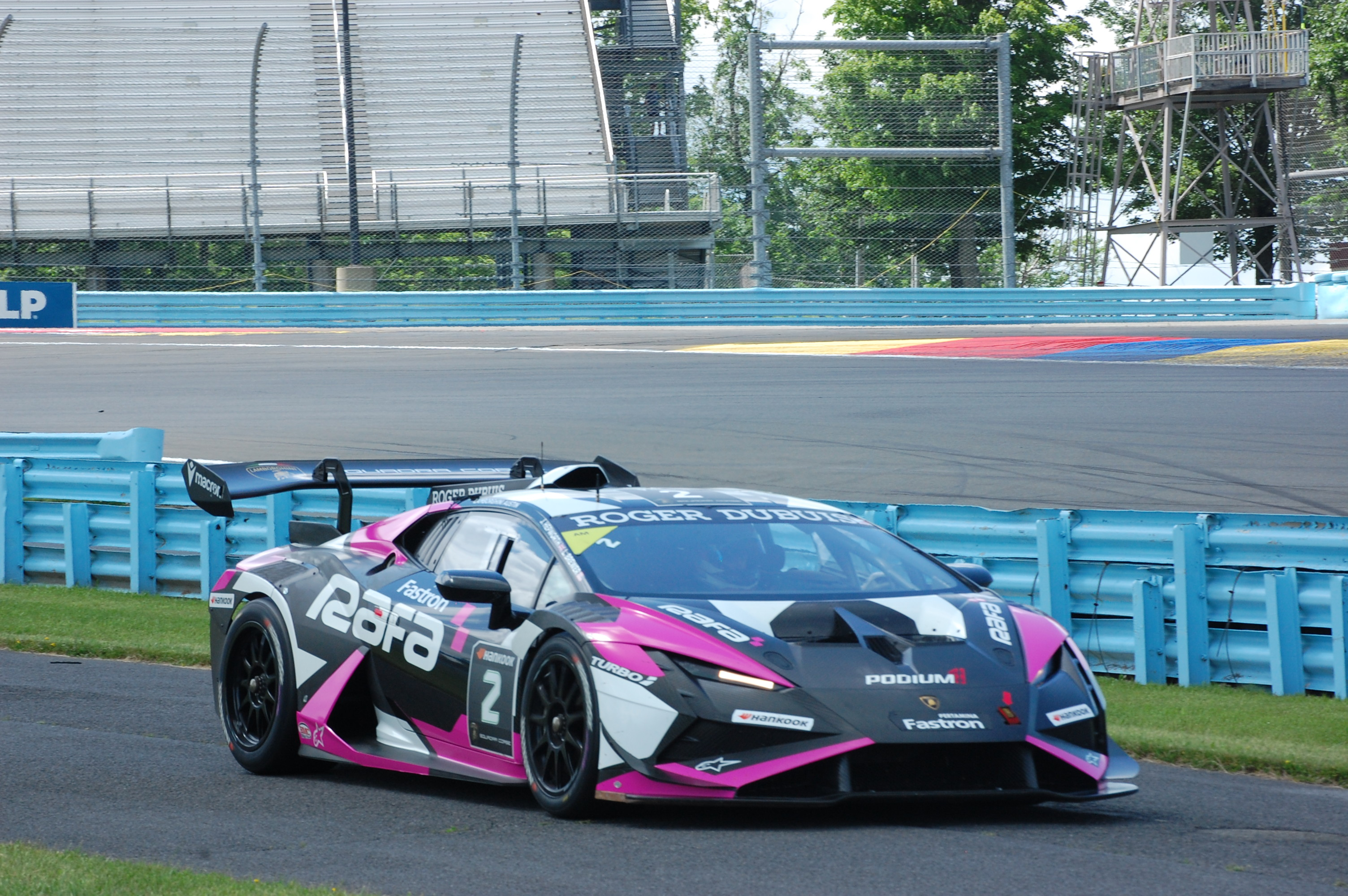
Brewer and Hepworth's RAFA Racing Lamborghini in 2025

In early July, a statement released by Juncos Hollinger Racing confirmed that Brewer had been temporarily dropped from the team due to unfulfilled contractual obligations. This left the team without a driver for the following race at Mid-Ohio due to their second driver, Ricardo Escotto, being a part-time entrant in the series.

=== Lamborghini Super Trofeo ===
In March 2025, Brewer was signed to RAFA Racing to compete in the amateur category of the Lamborghini Super Trofeo North America series alongside Jem Hepworth. The opening two rounds of the season took place at Sebring, where Brewer and Hepworth scored a sixth place and third place finish in the AM class. Ultimately the pair would finish the second two points off winning the AM class, with two class wins on the season.

For 2026, Brewer moved to Forty7Motorsports, scoring three podiums in her first four races alongside co-driver Keawn Tandon.

=== Formula E ===
In October 2025, Brewer tested for DS Penske, Formula E team during the all-women test at the Circuit Ricardo Tormo. She finished 13th of 14 drivers, 7.5 seconds off fellow American driver Chloe Chambers, who was fastest.

=== GT3 Revival Series ===
Brewer was announced as a driver for the GT3 Revival Series series alongside Célia Martin, competing in a Ford GT for 2026. The pair scored a top-five finish in the series first round at Le Castellet.

== Personal life ==
Brewer resides in Newport Beach, California. In addition to racing, Brewer is a model with representation from her general manager Chris Young. In 2024, she joined subscription service site Passes, joining fellow athlete and social media personality Olivia Dunne on the platform. She has dated her boyfriend Drew Solomon since meeting in college at San Diego State University. On June 12, 2026, Brewer married Drew Solomon in Lake Como in Italy. The same place where the couple got engaged on late July 2024.

== Racing record ==
=== Karting career summary ===
Season	Series	Position
2009	PSL Racing TAG MiniMax	5th
2011	Rocky Mountain Pro Kart Challenge - TAG Junior	5th
2014	SKUSA Pro Tour - S2	27th

=== Circuit career summary ===
Season	Series	Team	Races	Wins	Poles	F/Laps	Podiums	Points	Position
2021	TC America Series - TC	Skip Barber Racing School	8	0	0	0	0	23.5	14th
2021	Skip Barber Formula Race Series	Skip Barber Racing School	3	1	0	1	2	225	6th
2022	Indy Pro 2000 Championship	Exclusive Autosport	11	0	0	0	0	98	15th
2022	F1600 Championship Series	Exclusive Autosport	3	0	0	0	0	61	32nd
2023	USF Pro 2000 Championship	Exclusive Autosport	18	0	0	0	0	108	18th
2024	Indy NXT	Juncos Hollinger Racing	8	0	0	0	0	102	21st
2025	Lamborghini Super Trofeo North America - Am	RAFA Racing	12	2	0	0	9	124	**2nd**
2026	Lamborghini Super Trofeo North America - Pro-Am	Forty7 Motorsports	12	0	0	0	8	109	**2nd**
2026	GT3 Revival Series Pro-Am	Klausen Racing	8	0	0	0	0	34	8th

==== USF Pro 2000 Championship ====
(key) (Races in bold indicate pole position) (Races in italics indicate fastest lap) (Races with * indicate most race laps led)

Year	Team	1	2	3	4	5	6	7	8	9	10	11	12	13	14	15	16	17	18	Rank	Points
2022	Exclusive Autosport	STP; 1	STP; 2	ALA; 1	ALA; 2	IMS; 1; 8	IMS; 2; 12	IMS; 3; 13	IRP	ROA; 1; 16	ROA; 2; 14	MOH; 1	MOH; 2	TOR; 1; 13	TOR; 2; 10	STL; 13	POR; 1; 12	POR; 2; 12	POR; 3; 14	15th	98
2023	Exclusive Autosport	STP; 1; 13	STP; 2; 16	SEB; 1; 15	SEB; 2; 18	IMS; 1; 12	IMS; 2; 19	IRP; 16	ROA; 1; 13	ROA; 2; 14	MOH; 1; 16	MOH; 2; 19	TOR; 1; 16	TOR; 2; 12	COTA; 1; 14	COTA; 1; 19	POR; 1; 18	POR; 2; 15	POR; 3; 11	18th	108

==== Indy NXT ====
(key) (Races in bold indicate pole position) (Races in italics indicate fastest lap) (Races with ^{L} indicate a race lap led) (Races with * indicate most race laps led)

Year	Team	1	2	3	4	5	6	7	8	9	10	11	12	13	14	Rank	Points
2024	Juncos Hollinger Racing	STP; 15	BAR; 19	IMS1; 17	IMS2; 20	DET; 19	RDA; 16	LAG1; 17	LAG2; 15	MOH	IOW	STL	POR	MIL	NSH	21st	102

==== GT3 Revival Series ====
(key) (Races in bold indicate pole position) (Races in italics indicate fastest lap) (Races with ^{L} indicate a race lap led) (Races with * indicate most race laps led)

Year	Team	1	2	3	4	5	6	7	8	9	10	Rank	Points
2026	**Klausen Racing**	LEC1; 5	LEC2; 6	SPA1†; 8	SPA2; 9	LMS1; Ret	LMS2; DNS	NÜR1; Ret	NÜR2; 4	CAT1†	CAT2	8th	34

- † – Half points were awarded at both Race 1 in Spa and Race 1 in Barcelona. On both occasions red flags meant these races ran to less than 50% of their scheduled duration.
