= Precision Performance Motorsports =

American racing team

- Owner: Rick Gdovic
- Base: China Grove, North Carolina
- Series: WeatherTech SportsCar Championship
- Race drivers: (United States) Brandon Gdovic (United Kingdom) Johnathan Hoggard (United States) Mark Kvamme (United States) Eric Lux
- Manufacturer: Lamborghini
- Opened: 2011

Career
- Debut: Xfinity Series: 2015 Zippo 200 at The Glen (Watkins Glen)
- Latest race: Xfinity Series: 2017 Kansas Lottery 300 (Kansas)
- Races competed: Total: Xfinity Series: 18; K&N Pro Series East:
- Drivers' Championships: Total: 0 Xfinity Series: 0 K&N Pro Series East: 0
- Pole positions: Total: Xfinity Series: 0 K&N Pro Series East: 0

Precision Performance Motorsports (PPM) is an American professional sports car racing and former stock car racing team that currently competes full-time in the WeatherTech SportsCar Championship using a GT Daytona-class Lamborghini Huracán GT3 Evo. In stock car racing, the team was known for competing in the NASCAR Xfinity Series and the K&N Pro Series East. The team is owned by Rick Gdovic and was formed from the assets of Viva Motorsports. After the 2017 season, PPM shuttered its stock car operation to transition to sports car racing.

== Xfinity Series ==
=== Car No. 46 history ===
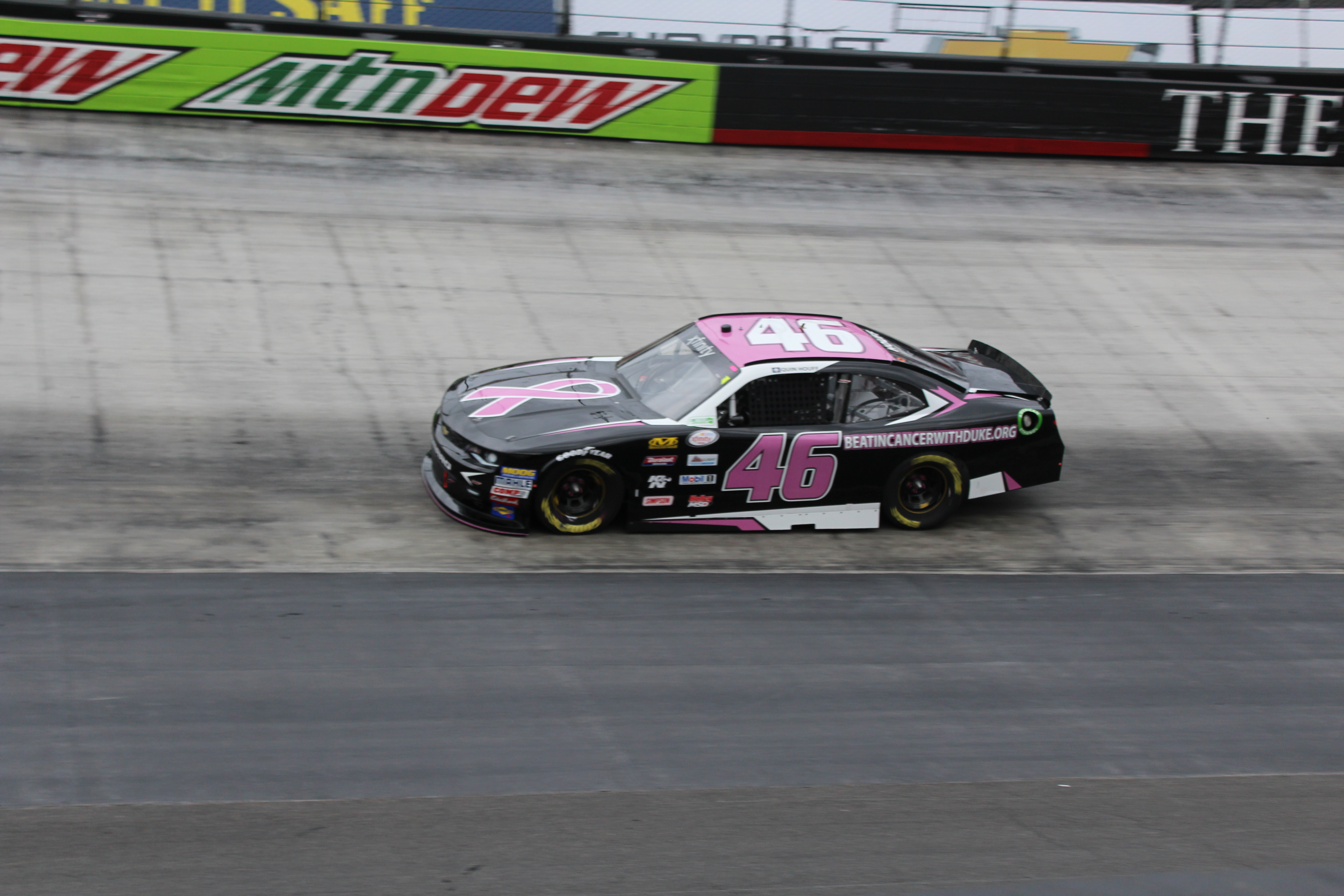
Quin Houff's No. 46 at Bristol Motor Speedway in 2017

The No. 46 team debut was at the season opener at Daytona International Speedway in 2016, with Anthony Kumpen behind the wheel with sponsorship Nexteer Automotive and Leaseplan. The second race for the No. 46 was the 2016 Fitzgerald Glider Kits 300 at Bristol with Brandon Gdovic behind the wheel with sponsorship Pitt Ohio Express. He started 27th and finished 18th. Gdovic also ran at Pocono, Indianapolis, the other Bristol race and Phoenix. Jordan Anderson drove the car in the season-finale at Homestead-Miami.

In 2017, Kumpen returned to the No. 46 at Daytona and Mid-Ohio Sports Car Course. Where he finished 22nd and 18th. Quin Houff made its Xfinity Series debut in the No. 46 at Bristol, with an impressive 15th-place finish. Houff also ran the following race at Richmond, the spring race at Iowa, the fall race at Kentucky and Kansas. Houff also failed to qualify for the summer race at Kentucky and in the season-finale at Homestead-Miami. Parker Kligerman drove the car at Road America and finished 10th, giving the team their first Top-10.

==== Car No. 46 results ====
Year	Driver	No.	Make	1	2	3	4	5	6	7	8	9	10	11	12	13	14	15	16	17	18	19	20	21	22	23	24	25	26	27	28	29	30	31	32	33	NXSC	Pts
2016	Anthony Kumpen	46	Chevy	DAY; 26	ATL	LVS	PHO	CAL	TEX																												44th	112
2016	Brandon Gdovic	46	Chevy							BRI; 18	RCH	TAL	DOV	CLT	POC; 26	MCH	IOW	DAY	KEN	NHA	IND; 27	IOW	GLN	MOH	BRI; 21	ROA	DAR	RCH	CHI	KEN	DOV	CLT	KAN	TEX	PHO; 21		44th	112
2016	Jordan Anderson	46	Chevy																																	HOM; 36	44th	112
2017	Anthony Kumpen	46	Chevy	DAY; 22	ATL	LVS	PHO	CAL	TEX															MOH; 16	BRI												40th	145
2017	Quin Houff	46	Chevy							BRI; 15	RCH; 27	TAL	CLT	DOV	POC	MCH	IOW; 12	DAY	KEN; DNQ	NHA	IND	IOW	GLN							KEN; 27	DOV	CLT	KAN; 22	TEX	PHO	HOM; DNQ	40th	145
2017	Parker Kligerman	46	Chevy																							ROA; 10	DAR	RCH	CHI								40th	145

=== Car No. 55 history ===
Brandon Gdovic drove two races in the No. 55 for Viva Motorsports before PPM purchased their equipment.

The team made their first Xfinity Series debut in 2015, at Watkins Glen, with Gdovic driving and finished a career best 13th. Anthony Kumpen signed with PPM to drive two races starting at Phoenix International Raceway and Homestead-Miami Speedway.

==== Car No. 55 results ====
Year	Driver	No.	Make	1	2	3	4	5	6	7	8	9	10	11	12	13	14	15	16	17	18	19	20	21	22	23	24	25	26	27	28	29	30	31	32	33	NXSC	Pts
2015	Brandon Gdovic	55	Chevy	DAY	ATL	LVS	PHO	CAL	TEX	BRI	RCH	TAL	IOW	CLT	DOV	MCH	CHI	DAY	KEN	NHA	IND	IOW	GLN; 13	MOH	BRI	ROA	DAR	RCH	CHI	KEN	DOV	CLT	KAN	TEX			38th	296
2015	Anthony Kumpen	55	Chevy																																PHO; 24	HOM; 27	38th	296

=== Sports car racing ===
The team announced in early December 2017 that it would be suspending its NASCAR operations and moving into the Continental Tire SportsCar Challenge and posted the sale of its Xfinity Series equipment. Later, team owner Rick Gdovic said that his son Brandon Gdovic wanted to move to sports car racing, and that the financial model in that discipline is better than stock car racing. Rick had tried to sell the team before the 2017 season began but an investment group set to buy the team fell through. In 2018, the team fielded two entries in the Lamborghini Super Trofeo North America series before expanding to the WeatherTech SportsCar Championship for 2019.
