= Mo Dadkhah =

American racing driver and actor

- Born: September 16, 1984 (age 41); Chicago, Illinois, U.S.
- Education: John Marshall Law School (J.D.)
- Occupations: Racing driver and actor

Mo Dadkhah (born September 16, 1984, in Chicago) is an American racing driver and actor. He has acted in various films such as The Broken Bridge.

== Early life ==
Mo Dadkhah was born to Shahriar Dadkhah (father) and Roya Dadkhah (mother) in the northern suburbs of Chicago. He went to both college and law school in Chicago.

== Education ==
Mo Dadkhah has a J.D. from John Marshall Law School in Chicago, Illinois.

Mo Dadkhah graduated from law school in 2009. After graduating from John Marshall Law School with a J.D. in 2009, he set up Dadkhah Law Group in 2009.

== Career ==
=== Race car driving ===
As a race car driver, Mo Dadkhah has appeared on shows airing on Motor Trend TV. He has appeared in Hagerty Drivers Club as a race car driver. His future ventures involve full season racing with Round 3 Racing in the World Racing League and hopefully in IMSA. He has also participated in the Porsche Club of America as a race car driver.

Dadkhah has raced with teammates such as Mike Gilbert, Loni Unser, among others.

In the Road America Challenge 2018 (Blue 2 Race 1), Dadkhah won 2nd place with a best time of 2:25.316.

=== Acting ===
Mo Dadkhah has also worked in several commercials, including the Hagerty Drivers Club Commercial. He has appeared as an actor in the film The Broken Bridge and on the TV show The Drive Within on Motortrend TV.
