= 2025 4 Hours of Sepang =

Endurance sportscar racing event

The layout of the Sepang International Circuit

The 2025 4 Hours of Sepang was an endurance sportscar racing event held between 12 and 14 December 2025 at Sepang International Circuit in Sepang, Malaysia. It was the first and second round of 2025–26 Asian Le Mans Series season.

== Entry list ==
The entry list was published on 28 November and consisted of 48 entries across 3 categories – 16 in LMP2, 10 in LMP3 and 22 in GT.

== Schedule ==
Date	Time (local: MST)	Event
Friday, 12 December	13:30	Free Practice 1
Friday, 12 December	16:00	Free Practice 2
Saturday, 13 December	9:50	Qualifying – GT
Saturday, 13 December	10:15	Qualifying – LMP3
Saturday, 13 December	10:40	Qualifying – LMP2
Saturday, 13 December	13:00	Race 1
Sunday, 14 December	13:00	Race 2

== Race 1 ==
=== Qualifying ===
Pole position winners in each class are marked in bold.

Pos	Class	No.	Team	Driver	Time	Gap	Grid
1	**LMP2**	**5**	**(United Kingdom) United Autosports**	**(Italy) Giorgio Roda**	**1:55.614**	—	1
2	LMP2	49	(Denmark) High Class Racing	(Denmark) Jens Reno Møller	1:56.202	+0.588	2
3	LMP2	43	(Poland) Inter Europol Competition	(Greece) Georgios Kolovos	1:56.382	+0.768	3
4	LMP2	20	(Portugal) Algarve Pro Racing	(United States) John Falb	1:56.900	+1.286	4
5	LMP2	22	(Germany) Proton Competition	(Portugal) Bernardo Sousa	1:56.933	+1.319	5
6	LMP2	3	(Luxembourg) DKR Engineering	(Germany) Alexander Mattschull	1:57.207	+1.593	6
7	LMP2	47	(Italy) Cetilar Racing	(Italy) Roberto Lacorte	1:57.504	+1.890	7
8	LMP2	4	(United States) CrowdStrike Racing by APR	(United States) George Kurtz	1:57.535	+1.921	8
9	LMP2	45	(Japan) PONOS Racing	(Japan) Yorikatsu Tsujiko	1:58.133	+2.519	9
10	LMP2	30	(France) RD Limited	(United States) Fred Poordad	1:58.408	+2.794	10
11	LMP2	6	(United Kingdom) United Autosports	(Canada) Phil Fayer	1:58.423	+2.809	11
12	LMP2	88	(Germany) Proton Competition	(Austria) Horst Felbermayr Jr.	1:58.622	+3.008	12
13	LMP2	64	(United Kingdom) Nielsen Racing	(Greece) Kriton Lendoudis	1:58.973	+3.359	13
14	LMP2	25	(Portugal) Algarve Pro Racing	(Denmark) Michael Jensen	1:58.987	+3.373	14
15	LMP2	44	(Slovakia) ARC Bratislava	(Slovakia) Miro Konôpka	2:00.145	+4.531	15
16	LMP2	70	(United Kingdom) Vector Sport RLR	(Brazil) Daniel Schneider	2:00.537	+4.923	16
17	**LMP3**	**17**	**(Switzerland) CLX Motorsport**	**(France) Paul Lanchère**	**2:12.401**	**+16.787**	17
18	LMP3	8	(Poland) Team Virage	(France) Romain Vozniak	2:12.670	+17.056	18
19	LMP3	1	(Poland) Team Virage	(Algeria) Julien Gerbi	2:13.321	+17.707	19
20	LMP3	71	(France) 23Events Racing	(United Kingdom) Terrence Woodward	2:13.730	+18.116	20
21	LMP3	85	(France) R-ace GP	(France) Fabien Michal	2:14.003	+18.389	21
22	LMP3	94	(Denmark) High Class Racing	(United Kingdom) Tim Whale	2:14.211	+18.597	22
23	LMP3	29	(France) Forestier Racing by VPS	(United Kingdom) Nick Adcock	2:14.275	+18.661	23
24	LMP3	23	(France) 23Events Racing	(France) Louis Stern	2:16.551	+20.937	24
25	LMP3	26	(Czech Republic) Bretton Racing	(Poland) Jacek Zielonka	2:17.398	+21.784	25
26	**GT**	**66**	**(Malaysia) JMR**	**(Australia) Yasser Shahin**	**2:19.236**	**+23.622**	27
27	GT	37	(Qatar) QMMF by GetSpeed	(Qatar) Abdulla Al-Khelaifi	2:19.467	+23.853	28
28	GT	77	(Germany) Proton Competition	(Japan) "Bankcy"	2:20.240	+24.626	29
29	GT	28	(Belgium) UNX Racing by Team WRT	(Belgium) Fabian Duffieux	2:20.605	+24.991	30
30	GT	69	(Belgium) Team WRT	(United States) Anthony McIntosh	2:20.893	+25.279	31
31	GT	56	(United Kingdom) Ecurie Ecosse Blackthorn	(Italy) Giacomo Petrobelli	2:21.120	+25.506	32
32	GT	99	(Malaysia) JMR	(Malaysia) Prince Jeffri Ibrahim	2:21.340	+25.726	33
33	GT	15	(Switzerland) Kessel Racing	(United States) Memo Gidley	2:21.469	+25.855	34
34	GT	89	(New Zealand) EBM	(Australia) Martin Berry	2:21.476	+25.862	35
35	GT	9	(Germany) GetSpeed	(Japan) Shigekazu Wakisaka	2:21.697	+26.083	36
36	GT	34	Racing Team Turkey	(Belgium) Tom van Rompuy	2:22.733	+27.119	37
37	GT	11	(United Kingdom) TF Sport	(United States) Blake McDonald	2:22.908	+27.294	38
38	GT	50	(Thailand) Amerasian Fragrance by AF Racing	(United States) Gregory Bennett	2:23.887	+28.273	39
39	GT	51	(Italy) AF Corse	(France) Charles-Henri Samani	2:24.599	+28.985	40
40	GT	87	(China) Origine Motorsport	(China) Bo Yuan	2:25.461	+29.847	41
41	GT	74	(Switzerland) Kessel Racing	(United States) Dustin Blattner	2:26.047	+30.433	42
42	GT	21	(Italy) AF Corse	(United Kingdom) Darren Leung	2:31.265	+35.651	43
43	GT	10	(Germany) Manthey	(Hong Kong) Antares Au	2:34.060	+38.446	44
44	GT	54	(Italy) Vista AF Corse	(Switzerland) Thomas Flohr	2:34.121	+38.507	45
45	GT	92	(Germany) Manthey	(France) François Hériau	2:34.255	+38.641	46
46	GT	59	(United Kingdom) United Autosports	(Australia) Mark Rosser	2:35.856	+40.242	47
47	LMP3	13	(Poland) Inter Europol Competition	No time set			26

=== Race ===
==== Race result ====
The minimum number of laps for classification (70% of overall winning car's distance) was 71 laps. Class winners are in bold and ‡.

Pos	Class	No	Team	Drivers	Chassis	Tyre	Laps	Time/Retired
Pos	Class	No	Team	Drivers	Engine	Tyre	Laps	Time/Retired
1	**LMP2**	**47**	**(Italy) Cetilar Racing**	**(Italy) Antonio Fuoco (Italy) Roberto Lacorte (France) Charles Milesi**	**Oreca 07**	MI	**102**	**4:00:34.716‡**
1	**LMP2**	**47**	**(Italy) Cetilar Racing**	**(Italy) Antonio Fuoco (Italy) Roberto Lacorte (France) Charles Milesi**	**Gibson GK428 4.2 L V8**	MI	**102**	**4:00:34.716‡**
2	LMP2	25	(Portugal) Algarve Pro Racing	(France) Tom Dillmann (Denmark) Michael Jensen (Italy) Enzo Trulli	Oreca 07	MI	102	+2.730
2	LMP2	25	(Portugal) Algarve Pro Racing	(France) Tom Dillmann (Denmark) Michael Jensen (Italy) Enzo Trulli	Gibson GK428 4.2 L V8	MI	102	+2.730
3	LMP2	4	(United States) CrowdStrike Racing by APR	(Switzerland) Louis Delétraz (Denmark) Malthe Jakobsen (United States) George Kurtz	Oreca 07	MI	102	+10.681
3	LMP2	4	(United States) CrowdStrike Racing by APR	(Switzerland) Louis Delétraz (Denmark) Malthe Jakobsen (United States) George Kurtz	Gibson GK428 4.2 L V8	MI	102	+10.681
4	LMP2	64	(United Kingdom) Nielsen Racing	(Turkey) Cem Bölükbaşı (Greece) Kriton Lendoudis (United Kingdom) Alex Quinn	Oreca 07	MI	102	+15.943
4	LMP2	64	(United Kingdom) Nielsen Racing	(Turkey) Cem Bölükbaşı (Greece) Kriton Lendoudis (United Kingdom) Alex Quinn	Gibson GK428 4.2 L V8	MI	102	+15.943
5	LMP2	5	(United Kingdom) United Autosports	(Denmark) Mikkel Jensen (Italy) Giorgio Roda (Switzerland) Grégoire Saucy	Oreca 07	MI	102	+16.000
5	LMP2	5	(United Kingdom) United Autosports	(Denmark) Mikkel Jensen (Italy) Giorgio Roda (Switzerland) Grégoire Saucy	Gibson GK428 4.2 L V8	MI	102	+16.000
6	LMP2	30	(France) RD Limited	(Australia) James Allen (United States) Fred Poordad (France) Tristan Vautier	Oreca 07	MI	102	+23.191
6	LMP2	30	(France) RD Limited	(Australia) James Allen (United States) Fred Poordad (France) Tristan Vautier	Gibson GK428 4.2 L V8	MI	102	+23.191
7	LMP2	6	(United Kingdom) United Autosports	(United Kingdom) Paul di Resta (Canada) Phil Fayer (United Kingdom) Ben Hanley	Oreca 07	MI	102	+24.301
7	LMP2	6	(United Kingdom) United Autosports	(United Kingdom) Paul di Resta (Canada) Phil Fayer (United Kingdom) Ben Hanley	Gibson GK428 4.2 L V8	MI	102	+24.301
8	LMP2	70	(United Kingdom) Vector Sport RLR	(United States) Jacob Abel (Grenada) Vladislav Lomko (Brazil) Daniel Schneider	Oreca 07	MI	102	+25.491
8	LMP2	70	(United Kingdom) Vector Sport RLR	(United States) Jacob Abel (Grenada) Vladislav Lomko (Brazil) Daniel Schneider	Gibson GK428 4.2 L V8	MI	102	+25.491
9	LMP2	88	(Germany) Proton Competition	(Austria) Horst Felbermayr Jr. (Austria) Horst Felix Felbermayr (Spain) Lorenzo Fluxá	Oreca 07	MI	102	+42.877
9	LMP2	88	(Germany) Proton Competition	(Austria) Horst Felbermayr Jr. (Austria) Horst Felix Felbermayr (Spain) Lorenzo Fluxá	Gibson GK428 4.2 L V8	MI	102	+42.877
10	LMP2	44	(Slovakia) ARC Bratislava	(France) Yann Ehrlacher (Slovakia) Miro Konôpka (France) Matthieu Vaxivière	Oreca 07	MI	102	+47.458
10	LMP2	44	(Slovakia) ARC Bratislava	(France) Yann Ehrlacher (Slovakia) Miro Konôpka (France) Matthieu Vaxivière	Gibson GK428 4.2 L V8	MI	102	+47.458
11	LMP2	3	(Luxembourg) DKR Engineering	(Switzerland) Mathias Beche (Germany) Alexander Mattschull (Australia) Griffin Peebles	Oreca 07	MI	102	+53.619
11	LMP2	3	(Luxembourg) DKR Engineering	(Switzerland) Mathias Beche (Germany) Alexander Mattschull (Australia) Griffin Peebles	Gibson GK428 4.2 L V8	MI	102	+53.619
12	LMP2	49	(Denmark) High Class Racing	(Denmark) Theodor Jensen (United States) Gustavo Menezes (Denmark) Jens Reno Møller	Oreca 07	MI	102	+1:01.543
12	LMP2	49	(Denmark) High Class Racing	(Denmark) Theodor Jensen (United States) Gustavo Menezes (Denmark) Jens Reno Møller	Gibson GK428 4.2 L V8	MI	102	+1:01.543
13	LMP2	20	(Portugal) Algarve Pro Racing	(United States) John Falb (Liechtenstein) Matthias Kaiser (France) Sami Meguetounif	Oreca 07	MI	102	+1:02.017
13	LMP2	20	(Portugal) Algarve Pro Racing	(United States) John Falb (Liechtenstein) Matthias Kaiser (France) Sami Meguetounif	Gibson GK428 4.2 L V8	MI	102	+1:02.017
14	LMP2	43	(Poland) Inter Europol Competition	(New Zealand) Nick Cassidy (Greece) Georgios Kolovos (United States) Nolan Siegel	Oreca 07	MI	101	+1 Lap
14	LMP2	43	(Poland) Inter Europol Competition	(New Zealand) Nick Cassidy (Greece) Georgios Kolovos (United States) Nolan Siegel	Gibson GK428 4.2 L V8	MI	101	+1 Lap
15	LMP2	45	(Japan) PONOS Racing	(Japan) Kei Cozzolino (Japan) Marino Sato (Japan) Yorikatsu Tsujiko	Oreca 07	MI	101	+1 Lap
15	LMP2	45	(Japan) PONOS Racing	(Japan) Kei Cozzolino (Japan) Marino Sato (Japan) Yorikatsu Tsujiko	Gibson GK428 4.2 L V8	MI	101	+1 Lap
16	LMP2	22	(Germany) Proton Competition	(Germany) Felipe Fernández Laser (Germany) Jonas Ried (Portugal) Bernardo Sousa	Oreca 07	MI	101	+1 Lap
16	LMP2	22	(Germany) Proton Competition	(Germany) Felipe Fernández Laser (Germany) Jonas Ried (Portugal) Bernardo Sousa	Gibson GK428 4.2 L V8	MI	101	+1 Lap
17	**LMP3**	**13**	**(Poland) Inter Europol Competition**	**(Saint Kitts and Nevis) Alexander Bukhantsov (Taiwan) Jimmy Chou (Colombia) Henry Cubides Olarte**	**Ligier JS P325**	MI	**97**	**+5 Laps‡**
17	**LMP3**	**13**	**(Poland) Inter Europol Competition**	**(Saint Kitts and Nevis) Alexander Bukhantsov (Taiwan) Jimmy Chou (Colombia) Henry Cubides Olarte**	**Toyota V35A-FTS 3.5 L Turbo V6**	MI	**97**	**+5 Laps‡**
18	LMP3	94	(Denmark) High Class Racing	(Denmark) Philip Lindberg (United Kingdom) Callum Voisin (United Kingdom) Tim Whale	Ligier JS P325	MI	97	+5 Laps
18	LMP3	94	(Denmark) High Class Racing	(Denmark) Philip Lindberg (United Kingdom) Callum Voisin (United Kingdom) Tim Whale	Toyota V35A-FTS 3.5 L Turbo V6	MI	97	+5 Laps
19	LMP3	17	(Switzerland) CLX Motorsport	(United States) Alexander Jacoby (France) Paul Lanchère (Switzerland) Kévin Rabin	Ligier JS P325	MI	97	+5 Laps
19	LMP3	17	(Switzerland) CLX Motorsport	(United States) Alexander Jacoby (France) Paul Lanchère (Switzerland) Kévin Rabin	Toyota V35A-FTS 3.5 L Turbo V6	MI	97	+5 Laps
20	**GT**	**9**	**(Germany) GetSpeed**	**(United States) Anthony Bartone (Germany) Fabian Schiller (Japan) Shigekazu Wakisaka**	**Mercedes-AMG GT3 Evo**	MI	**96**	**+6 Laps‡**
20	**GT**	**9**	**(Germany) GetSpeed**	**(United States) Anthony Bartone (Germany) Fabian Schiller (Japan) Shigekazu Wakisaka**	**Mercedes-AMG M159 6.2 L V8**	MI	**96**	**+6 Laps‡**
21	GT	10	(Germany) Manthey	(Hong Kong) Antares Au (Austria) Klaus Bachler (Netherlands) Loek Hartog	Porsche 911 GT3 R (992)	MI	96	+6 Laps (Note: The No. 10 Manthey entry received a one-place drop penalty for forcing the No. 9 GetSpeed entry off track.)
21	GT	10	(Germany) Manthey	(Hong Kong) Antares Au (Austria) Klaus Bachler (Netherlands) Loek Hartog	Porsche M97/80 4.2 L Flat-6	MI	96	+6 Laps
22	GT	56	(United Kingdom) Ecurie Ecosse Blackthorn	(United Kingdom) Jonathan Adam (Belgium) Kobe Pauwels (Italy) Giacomo Petrobelli	Aston Martin Vantage AMR GT3 Evo	MI	96	+6 Laps
22	GT	56	(United Kingdom) Ecurie Ecosse Blackthorn	(United Kingdom) Jonathan Adam (Belgium) Kobe Pauwels (Italy) Giacomo Petrobelli	Aston Martin M177 4.0 L Turbo V8	MI	96	+6 Laps
23	GT	92	(Germany) Manthey	(France) François Hériau (Austria) Richard Lietz (Italy) Riccardo Pera	Porsche 911 GT3 R (992)	MI	96	+6 Laps
23	GT	92	(Germany) Manthey	(France) François Hériau (Austria) Richard Lietz (Italy) Riccardo Pera	Porsche M97/80 4.2 L Flat-6	MI	96	+6 Laps
24	GT	74	(Switzerland) Kessel Racing	(United States) Dustin Blattner (United Kingdom) Chris Lulham (Germany) Dennis Marschall	Ferrari 296 GT3	MI	96	+6 Laps
24	GT	74	(Switzerland) Kessel Racing	(United States) Dustin Blattner (United Kingdom) Chris Lulham (Germany) Dennis Marschall	Ferrari F163CE 3.0 L Turbo V6	MI	96	+6 Laps
25	GT	87	(China) Origine Motorsport	(Germany) Laurin Heinrich (China) Leo Ye Hongli (China) Bo Yuan	Porsche 911 GT3 R (992)	MI	96	+6 Laps
25	GT	87	(China) Origine Motorsport	(Germany) Laurin Heinrich (China) Leo Ye Hongli (China) Bo Yuan	Porsche M97/80 4.2 L Flat-6	MI	96	+6 Laps
26	GT	89	(New Zealand) EBM	(Australia) Martin Berry (United Kingdom) Jamie Day (Belgium) Matisse Lismont	Aston Martin Vantage AMR GT3 Evo	MI	96	+6 Laps
26	GT	89	(New Zealand) EBM	(Australia) Martin Berry (United Kingdom) Jamie Day (Belgium) Matisse Lismont	Aston Martin M177 4.0 L Turbo V8	MI	96	+6 Laps
27	GT	34	Racing Team Turkey	(Republic of Ireland) Charlie Eastwood (Belgium) Tom van Rompuy (Turkey) Salih Yoluç	Chevrolet Corvette Z06 GT3.R	MI	96	+6 Laps
27	GT	34	Racing Team Turkey	(Republic of Ireland) Charlie Eastwood (Belgium) Tom van Rompuy (Turkey) Salih Yoluç	Chevrolet LT6.R 5.5 L V8	MI	96	+6 Laps
28	GT	99	(Malaysia) JMR	(United Kingdom) Ben Green (Malaysia) Prince Jeffri Ibrahim (Australia) Jordan Love	Chevrolet Corvette Z06 GT3.R	MI	96	+6 Laps
28	GT	99	(Malaysia) JMR	(United Kingdom) Ben Green (Malaysia) Prince Jeffri Ibrahim (Australia) Jordan Love	Chevrolet LT6.R 5.5 L V8	MI	96	+6 Laps
29	GT	77	(Germany) Proton Competition	(Japan) "Bankcy" (Japan) Kiyoto Fujinami (United Kingdom) Harry King	Porsche 911 GT3 R (992)	MI	96	+6 Laps
29	GT	77	(Germany) Proton Competition	(Japan) "Bankcy" (Japan) Kiyoto Fujinami (United Kingdom) Harry King	Porsche M97/80 4.2 L Flat-6	MI	96	+6 Laps
30	GT	54	(Italy) Vista AF Corse	(Italy) Francesco Castellacci (Switzerland) Thomas Flohr (Italy) Alessandro Pier Guidi	Ferrari 296 GT3	MI	96	+6 Laps
30	GT	54	(Italy) Vista AF Corse	(Italy) Francesco Castellacci (Switzerland) Thomas Flohr (Italy) Alessandro Pier Guidi	Ferrari F163CE 3.0 L Turbo V6	MI	96	+6 Laps
31	GT	69	(Belgium) Team WRT	(United Kingdom) Dan Harper (United States) Anthony McIntosh (Canada) Parker Thompson	BMW M4 GT3	MI	96	+6 Laps
31	GT	69	(Belgium) Team WRT	(United Kingdom) Dan Harper (United States) Anthony McIntosh (Canada) Parker Thompson	BMW P58 3.0 L Turbo I6	MI	96	+6 Laps
32	GT	59	(United Kingdom) United Autosports	(United Kingdom) Wayne Boyd (Australia) Garnet Patterson (Australia) Mark Rosser	McLaren 720S GT3 Evo	MI	96	+6 Laps
32	GT	59	(United Kingdom) United Autosports	(United Kingdom) Wayne Boyd (Australia) Garnet Patterson (Australia) Mark Rosser	McLaren M840T 4.0 L Turbo V8	MI	96	+6 Laps
33	GT	51	(Italy) AF Corse	(Indonesia) Sean Gelael (Italy) Davide Rigon (France) Charles-Henri Samani	Ferrari 296 GT3	MI	96	+6 Laps (Note: The No. 51 AF Corse entry received a 5-second penalty because the 'dedicated driver help' performed other duties.)
33	GT	51	(Italy) AF Corse	(Indonesia) Sean Gelael (Italy) Davide Rigon (France) Charles-Henri Samani	Ferrari F163CE 3.0 L Turbo V6	MI	96	+6 Laps
34	GT	11	(United Kingdom) TF Sport	(United Kingdom) Matt Bell (United States) Blake McDonald (Republic of Ireland) James Roe	Chevrolet Corvette Z06 GT3.R	MI	96	+6 Laps
34	GT	11	(United Kingdom) TF Sport	(United Kingdom) Matt Bell (United States) Blake McDonald (Republic of Ireland) James Roe	Chevrolet LT6.R 5.5 L V8	MI	96	+6 Laps
35	GT	66	(Malaysia) JMR	(Malaysia) Prince Abu Bakar Ibrahim (Australia) Yasser Shahin (United Kingdom) Alexander Sims	Chevrolet Corvette Z06 GT3.R	MI	95	+7 Laps
35	GT	66	(Malaysia) JMR	(Malaysia) Prince Abu Bakar Ibrahim (Australia) Yasser Shahin (United Kingdom) Alexander Sims	Chevrolet LT6.R 5.5 L V8	MI	95	+7 Laps
36	GT	28	(Belgium) UNX Racing by Team WRT	(Belgium) Mathieu Detry (Belgium) Fabian Duffieux (Brazil) Augusto Farfus	BMW M4 GT3	MI	95	+7 Laps
36	GT	28	(Belgium) UNX Racing by Team WRT	(Belgium) Mathieu Detry (Belgium) Fabian Duffieux (Brazil) Augusto Farfus	BMW P58 3.0 L Turbo I6	MI	95	+7 Laps
37	LMP3	23	(France) 23Events Racing	(United Kingdom) Isaac Barashi (Italy) Matteo Quintarelli (France) Louis Stern	Ligier JS P325	MI	95	+7 Laps
37	LMP3	23	(France) 23Events Racing	(United Kingdom) Isaac Barashi (Italy) Matteo Quintarelli (France) Louis Stern	Toyota V35A-FTS 3.5 L Turbo V6	MI	95	+7 Laps
38	GT	15	(Switzerland) Kessel Racing	(Italy) Alessandro Balzan (United States) Memo Gidley (United States) Dylan Medler	Ferrari 296 GT3	MI	95	+7 Laps
38	GT	15	(Switzerland) Kessel Racing	(Italy) Alessandro Balzan (United States) Memo Gidley (United States) Dylan Medler	Ferrari F163CE 3.0 L Turbo V6	MI	95	+7 Laps
39	LMP3	29	(France) Forestier Racing by VPS	(United Kingdom) Nick Adcock (Brazil) Lucas Fecury (France) Luciano Morano	Ligier JS P325	MI	95	+7 Laps
39	LMP3	29	(France) Forestier Racing by VPS	(United Kingdom) Nick Adcock (Brazil) Lucas Fecury (France) Luciano Morano	Toyota V35A-FTS 3.5 L Turbo V6	MI	95	+7 Laps
40	GT	37	(Qatar) QMMF by GetSpeed	(Qatar) Abdulla Al-Khelaifi (Austria) Lucas Auer (Qatar) Ghanim Al-Maadheed	Mercedes-AMG GT3 Evo	MI	95	+7 Laps (Note: The No. 37 QMMF by GetSpeed entry received a 5-second penalty for an unsafe release during their final pit stop. The entry received a further drive-through penalty converted to a 25-second post-race penalty for causing an accident with the No. 21 AF Corse entry.)
40	GT	37	(Qatar) QMMF by GetSpeed	(Qatar) Abdulla Al-Khelaifi (Austria) Lucas Auer (Qatar) Ghanim Al-Maadheed	Mercedes-AMG M159 6.2 L V8	MI	95	+7 Laps
41	LMP3	8	(Poland) Team Virage	(India) Aditya Patel (Belgium) Vic Stevens (France) Romain Vozniak	Ligier JS P325	MI	93	+9 Laps
41	LMP3	8	(Poland) Team Virage	(India) Aditya Patel (Belgium) Vic Stevens (France) Romain Vozniak	Toyota V35A-FTS 3.5 L Turbo V6	MI	93	+9 Laps
42	LMP3	26	(Czech Republic) Bretton Racing	(Spain) Lucas Fluxá (Germany) Lenny Ried (Poland) Jacek Zielonka	Ligier JS P325	MI	93	+9 Laps (Note: The No. 26 Bretton Racing entry received a 5-second penalty for causing a collision with the No. 59 United Autosports entry.)
42	LMP3	26	(Czech Republic) Bretton Racing	(Spain) Lucas Fluxá (Germany) Lenny Ried (Poland) Jacek Zielonka	Toyota V35A-FTS 3.5 L Turbo V6	MI	93	+9 Laps
43	LMP3	85	(France) R-ace GP	(France) Fabien Michal (France) Pierre-Alexandre Provost (Germany) Hugo Schwarze	Duqueine D09	MI	82	+20 Laps
43	LMP3	85	(France) R-ace GP	(France) Fabien Michal (France) Pierre-Alexandre Provost (Germany) Hugo Schwarze	Toyota V35A-FTS 3.5 L Turbo V6	MI	82	+20 Laps
Not classified
	GT	50	(Thailand) Amerasian Fragrance by AF Racing	(Thailand) Carl Bennett (United States) Gregory Bennett (Italy) Tommaso Mosca	Ferrari 296 GT3	MI	77	Did not finish
	GT	50	(Thailand) Amerasian Fragrance by AF Racing	(Thailand) Carl Bennett (United States) Gregory Bennett (Italy) Tommaso Mosca	Ferrari F163CE 3.0 L Turbo V6	MI	77	Did not finish
	GT	21	(Italy) AF Corse	(United Kingdom) Darren Leung (United States) Simon Mann (Italy) Alessio Rovera	Ferrari 296 GT3	MI	73	Accident
	GT	21	(Italy) AF Corse	(United Kingdom) Darren Leung (United States) Simon Mann (Italy) Alessio Rovera	Ferrari F163CE 3.0 L Turbo V6	MI	73	Accident
	LMP3	1	(Poland) Team Virage	(Algeria) Julien Gerbi (India) Narain Karthikeyan (India) Ajith Kumar	Ligier JS P325	MI	17	Not classified
	LMP3	1	(Poland) Team Virage	(Algeria) Julien Gerbi (India) Narain Karthikeyan (India) Ajith Kumar	Toyota V35A-FTS 3.5 L Turbo V6	MI	17	Not classified
	LMP3	71	(France) 23Events Racing	(Egypt) Ibrahim Badawy (Slovakia) Matúš Ryba (United Kingdom) Terrence Woodward	Ligier JS P325	MI	1	Accident
	LMP3	71	(France) 23Events Racing	(Egypt) Ibrahim Badawy (Slovakia) Matúš Ryba (United Kingdom) Terrence Woodward	Toyota V35A-FTS 3.5 L Turbo V6	MI	1	Accident

== Race 2 ==
=== Qualifying ===
Pole position winners in each class are marked in bold.

Pos	Class	No.	Team	Driver	Time	Gap	Grid
1	**LMP2**	**49**	**(Denmark) High Class Racing**	**(Denmark) Jens Reno Møller**	**1:56.262**	—	1
2	LMP2	43	(Poland) Inter Europol Competition	(Greece) Georgios Kolovos	1:56.587	+0.325	2
3	LMP2	5	(United Kingdom) United Autosports	(Italy) Giorgio Roda	1:56.726	+0.464	3
4	LMP2	3	(Luxembourg) DKR Engineering	(Germany) Alexander Mattschull	1:57.234	+0.972	4
5	LMP2	47	(Italy) Cetilar Racing	(Italy) Roberto Lacorte	1:57.772	+1.510	5
6	LMP2	20	(Portugal) Algarve Pro Racing	(United States) John Falb	1:57.776	+1.514	6
7	LMP2	22	(Germany) Proton Competition	(Portugal) Bernardo Sousa	1:58.038	+1.776	7
8	LMP2	6	(United Kingdom) United Autosports	(Canada) Phil Fayer	1:58.675	+2.413	8
9	LMP2	88	(Germany) Proton Competition	(Austria) Horst Felbermayr Jr.	1:58.726	+2.464	9
10	LMP2	4	(United States) CrowdStrike Racing by APR	(United States) George Kurtz	1:59.050	+2.788	10
11	LMP2	30	(France) RD Limited	(United States) Fred Poordad	1:59.258	+2.996	11
12	LMP2	45	(Japan) PONOS Racing	(Japan) Yorikatsu Tsujiko	1:59.334	+3.072	WD
13	LMP2	64	(United Kingdom) Nielsen Racing	(Greece) Kriton Lendoudis	1:59.633	+3.371	12
14	LMP2	70	(United Kingdom) Vector Sport RLR	(Brazil) Daniel Schneider	2:01.919	+5.657	13
15	LMP2	44	(Slovakia) ARC Bratislava	(Slovakia) Miro Konôpka	2:02.276	+6.014	14
16	LMP2	25	(Portugal) Algarve Pro Racing	(Denmark) Michael Jensen	2:04.318	+8.056	15
17	**LMP3**	**17**	**(Switzerland) CLX Motorsport**	**(France) Paul Lanchère**	**2:12.580**	**+16.318**	16
18	LMP3	8	(Poland) Team Virage	(France) Romain Vozniak	2:12.914	+16.652	17
19	LMP3	1	(Poland) Team Virage	(Algeria) Julien Gerbi	2:13.581	+17.319	18
20	LMP3	71	(France) 23Events Racing	(United Kingdom) Terrence Woodward	2:13.772	+17.510	19
21	LMP3	85	(France) R-ace GP	(France) Fabien Michal	2:14.031	+17.769	20
22	LMP3	29	(France) Forestier Racing by VPS	(United Kingdom) Nick Adcock	2:14.357	+18.095	21
23	LMP3	94	(Denmark) High Class Racing	(United Kingdom) Tim Whale	2:15.318	+19.056	22
24	LMP3	23	(France) 23Events Racing	(France) Louis Stern	2:16.678	+20.416	23
25	LMP3	26	(Czech Republic) Bretton Racing	(Poland) Jacek Zielonka	2:18.771	+22.509	24
26	**GT**	**66**	**(Malaysia) JMR**	**(Australia) Yasser Shahin**	**2:20.093**	**+23.831**	26
27	GT	37	(Qatar) QMMF by GetSpeed	(Qatar) Abdulla Al-Khelaifi	2:21.007	+24.745	27
28	GT	77	(Germany) Proton Competition	(Japan) "Bankcy"	2:21.210	+24.948	28
29	GT	69	(Belgium) Team WRT	(United States) Anthony McIntosh	2:21.601	+25.339	29
30	GT	9	(Germany) GetSpeed	(Japan) Shigekazu Wakisaka	2:21.793	+25.531	30
31	GT	99	(Malaysia) JMR	(Malaysia) Prince Jeffri Ibrahim	2:21.829	+25.567	31
32	GT	56	(United Kingdom) Ecurie Ecosse Blackthorn	(Italy) Giacomo Petrobelli	2:22.137	+25.875	32
33	GT	89	(New Zealand) EBM	(Australia) Martin Berry	2:22.192	+25.930	33
34	GT	15	(Switzerland) Kessel Racing	(United States) Memo Gidley	2:22.608	+26.346	34
35	GT	34	Racing Team Turkey	(Belgium) Tom van Rompuy	2:22.793	+26.531	35
36	GT	28	(Belgium) UNX Racing by Team WRT	(Belgium) Fabian Duffieux	2:24.069	+27.807	36
37	GT	11	(United Kingdom) TF Sport	(United States) Blake McDonald	2:24.183	27.921	37
38	GT	51	(Italy) AF Corse	(France) Charles-Henri Samani	2:25.312	+29.050	38
39	GT	87	(China) Origine Motorsport	(China) Bo Yuan	2:28.739	+32.477	39
40	GT	74	(Switzerland) Kessel Racing	(United States) Dustin Blattner	2:29.982	+33.720	40
41	GT	21	(Italy) AF Corse	(United Kingdom) Darren Leung	2:32.963	+36.701	41
42	GT	10	(Germany) Manthey	(Hong Kong) Antares Au	2:35.916	+39.654	42
43	GT	54	(Italy) Vista AF Corse	(Switzerland) Thomas Flohr	2:36.117	+39.855	43
44	GT	59	(United Kingdom) United Autosports	(Australia) Mark Rosser	2:37.748	+41.486	44
45	GT	92	(Germany) Manthey	(France) François Hériau	2:38.135	+41.873	45
46	GT	50	(Thailand) Amerasian Fragrance by AF Racing	(United States) Gregory Bennett	2:54.957	+58.695	46
47	LMP3	13	(Poland) Inter Europol Competition	No time set			25

=== Race ===
The race was ended 20 minutes early due to heavy rain that hit the circuit.

==== Race result ====
The minimum number of laps for classification (70% of overall winning car's distance) was 64 laps. Class winners are in bold and ‡.

Pos	Class	No	Team	Drivers	Chassis	Tyre	Laps	Time/Retired
Pos	Class	No	Team	Drivers	Engine	Tyre	Laps	Time/Retired
1	**LMP2**	**47**	**(Italy) Cetilar Racing**	**(Italy) Antonio Fuoco** **(Italy) Roberto Lacorte** **(France) Charles Milesi**	**Oreca 07**	MI	**92**	**3:41:18.101‡**
1	**LMP2**	**47**	**(Italy) Cetilar Racing**	**(Italy) Antonio Fuoco** **(Italy) Roberto Lacorte** **(France) Charles Milesi**	**Gibson GK428 4.2 L V8**	MI	**92**	**3:41:18.101‡**
2	LMP2	25	(Portugal) Algarve Pro Racing	(France) Tom Dillmann (Denmark) Michael Jensen (Italy) Enzo Trulli	Oreca 07	MI	92	+7.501
2	LMP2	25	(Portugal) Algarve Pro Racing	(France) Tom Dillmann (Denmark) Michael Jensen (Italy) Enzo Trulli	Gibson GK428 4.2 L V8	MI	92	+7.501
3	LMP2	4	(United States) CrowdStrike Racing by APR	(Switzerland) Louis Delétraz (Denmark) Malthe Jakobsen (United States) George Kurtz	Oreca 07	MI	92	+8.373
3	LMP2	4	(United States) CrowdStrike Racing by APR	(Switzerland) Louis Delétraz (Denmark) Malthe Jakobsen (United States) George Kurtz	Gibson GK428 4.2 L V8	MI	92	+8.373
4	LMP2	3	(Luxembourg) DKR Engineering	(Switzerland) Mathias Beche (Germany) Alexander Mattschull (Australia) Griffin Peebles	Oreca 07	MI	92	+16.671
4	LMP2	3	(Luxembourg) DKR Engineering	(Switzerland) Mathias Beche (Germany) Alexander Mattschull (Australia) Griffin Peebles	Gibson GK428 4.2 L V8	MI	92	+16.671
5	LMP2	88	(Germany) Proton Competition	(Austria) Horst Felbermayr Jr. (Austria) Horst Felix Felbermayr (Spain) Lorenzo Fluxá	Oreca 07	MI	92	+19.110
5	LMP2	88	(Germany) Proton Competition	(Austria) Horst Felbermayr Jr. (Austria) Horst Felix Felbermayr (Spain) Lorenzo Fluxá	Gibson GK428 4.2 L V8	MI	92	+19.110
6	LMP2	5	(United Kingdom) United Autosports	(Denmark) Mikkel Jensen (Italy) Giorgio Roda (Switzerland) Grégoire Saucy	Oreca 07	MI	92	+28.147
6	LMP2	5	(United Kingdom) United Autosports	(Denmark) Mikkel Jensen (Italy) Giorgio Roda (Switzerland) Grégoire Saucy	Gibson GK428 4.2 L V8	MI	92	+28.147
7	LMP2	49	(Denmark) High Class Racing	(Denmark) Theodor Jensen (United States) Gustavo Menezes (Denmark) Jens Reno Møller	Oreca 07	MI	92	+33.931
7	LMP2	49	(Denmark) High Class Racing	(Denmark) Theodor Jensen (United States) Gustavo Menezes (Denmark) Jens Reno Møller	Gibson GK428 4.2 L V8	MI	92	+33.931
8	LMP2	30	(France) RD Limited	(Australia) James Allen (United States) Fred Poordad (France) Tristan Vautier	Oreca 07	MI	91	+1 Lap
8	LMP2	30	(France) RD Limited	(Australia) James Allen (United States) Fred Poordad (France) Tristan Vautier	Gibson GK428 4.2 L V8	MI	91	+1 Lap
9	LMP2	64	(United Kingdom) Nielsen Racing	(Turkey) Cem Bölükbaşı (Greece) Kriton Lendoudis (United Kingdom) Alex Quinn	Oreca 07	MI	91	+1 Lap
9	LMP2	64	(United Kingdom) Nielsen Racing	(Turkey) Cem Bölükbaşı (Greece) Kriton Lendoudis (United Kingdom) Alex Quinn	Gibson GK428 4.2 L V8	MI	91	+1 Lap
10	LMP2	44	(Slovakia) ARC Bratislava	(France) Yann Ehrlacher (Slovakia) Miro Konôpka (France) Matthieu Vaxivière	Oreca 07	MI	91	+1 Lap
10	LMP2	44	(Slovakia) ARC Bratislava	(France) Yann Ehrlacher (Slovakia) Miro Konôpka (France) Matthieu Vaxivière	Gibson GK428 4.2 L V8	MI	91	+1 Lap
11	LMP2	22	(Germany) Proton Competition	(Germany) Felipe Fernández Laser (Germany) Jonas Ried (Portugal) Bernardo Sousa	Oreca 07	MI	91	+1 Lap (Note: The No. 22 Proton Competition entry received a 5-second time penalty for an unsafe release.)
11	LMP2	22	(Germany) Proton Competition	(Germany) Felipe Fernández Laser (Germany) Jonas Ried (Portugal) Bernardo Sousa	Gibson GK428 4.2 L V8	MI	91	+1 Lap
12	LMP2	43	(Poland) Inter Europol Competition	(New Zealand) Nick Cassidy (Greece) Georgios Kolovos (United States) Nolan Siegel	Oreca 07	MI	91	+1 Lap
12	LMP2	43	(Poland) Inter Europol Competition	(New Zealand) Nick Cassidy (Greece) Georgios Kolovos (United States) Nolan Siegel	Gibson GK428 4.2 L V8	MI	91	+1 Lap
13	LMP2	20	(Portugal) Algarve Pro Racing	(United States) John Falb (Liechtenstein) Matthias Kaiser (France) Sami Meguetounif	Oreca 07	MI	90	+2 Laps
13	LMP2	20	(Portugal) Algarve Pro Racing	(United States) John Falb (Liechtenstein) Matthias Kaiser (France) Sami Meguetounif	Gibson GK428 4.2 L V8	MI	90	+2 Laps
14	LMP2	6	(United Kingdom) United Autosports	(United Kingdom) Paul di Resta (Canada) Phil Fayer (United Kingdom) Ben Hanley	Oreca 07	MI	89	+3 Laps
14	LMP2	6	(United Kingdom) United Autosports	(United Kingdom) Paul di Resta (Canada) Phil Fayer (United Kingdom) Ben Hanley	Gibson GK428 4.2 L V8	MI	89	+3 Laps
15	LMP2	70	(United Kingdom) Vector Sport RLR	(United States) Jacob Abel (Grenada) Vladislav Lomko (Brazil) Daniel Schneider	Oreca 07	MI	88	+4 Laps
15	LMP2	70	(United Kingdom) Vector Sport RLR	(United States) Jacob Abel (Grenada) Vladislav Lomko (Brazil) Daniel Schneider	Gibson GK428 4.2 L V8	MI	88	+4 Laps
16	**GT**	**74**	**(Switzerland) Kessel Racing**	**(United States) Dustin Blattner** **(United Kingdom) Chris Lulham** **(Germany) Dennis Marschall**	**Ferrari 296 GT3**	MI	**87**	**+5 Laps‡**
16	**GT**	**74**	**(Switzerland) Kessel Racing**	**(United States) Dustin Blattner** **(United Kingdom) Chris Lulham** **(Germany) Dennis Marschall**	**Ferrari F163CE 3.0 L Turbo V6**	MI	**87**	**+5 Laps‡**
17	GT	69	(Belgium) Team WRT	(United Kingdom) Dan Harper (United States) Anthony McIntosh (Canada) Parker Thompson	BMW M4 GT3	MI	87	+5 Laps
17	GT	69	(Belgium) Team WRT	(United Kingdom) Dan Harper (United States) Anthony McIntosh (Canada) Parker Thompson	BMW P58 3.0 L Turbo I6	MI	87	+5 Laps
18	GT	87	(China) Origine Motorsport	(Germany) Laurin Heinrich (China) Leo Ye Hongli (China) Bo Yuan	Porsche 911 GT3 R (992)	MI	87	+5 Laps
18	GT	87	(China) Origine Motorsport	(Germany) Laurin Heinrich (China) Leo Ye Hongli (China) Bo Yuan	Porsche M97/80 4.2 L Flat-6	MI	87	+5 Laps
19	**LMP3**	**17**	**(Switzerland) CLX Motorsport**	**(United States) Alexander Jacoby** **(France) Paul Lanchère** **(Switzerland) Kévin Rabin**	**Ligier JS P325**	MI	**87**	**+5 Laps‡**
19	**LMP3**	**17**	**(Switzerland) CLX Motorsport**	**(United States) Alexander Jacoby** **(France) Paul Lanchère** **(Switzerland) Kévin Rabin**	**Toyota V35A-FTS 3.5 L Turbo V6**	MI	**87**	**+5 Laps‡**
20	GT	51	(Italy) AF Corse	(Indonesia) Sean Gelael (Italy) Davide Rigon (France) Charles-Henri Samani	Ferrari 296 GT3	MI	87	+5 Laps
20	GT	51	(Italy) AF Corse	(Indonesia) Sean Gelael (Italy) Davide Rigon (France) Charles-Henri Samani	Ferrari F163CE 3.0 L Turbo V6	MI	87	+5 Laps
21	GT	54	(Italy) Vista AF Corse	(Italy) Francesco Castellacci (Switzerland) Thomas Flohr (Italy) Alessandro Pier Guidi	Ferrari 296 GT3	MI	87	+5 Laps
21	GT	54	(Italy) Vista AF Corse	(Italy) Francesco Castellacci (Switzerland) Thomas Flohr (Italy) Alessandro Pier Guidi	Ferrari F163CE 3.0 L Turbo V6	MI	87	+5 Laps
22	GT	9	(Germany) GetSpeed	(United States) Anthony Bartone (Germany) Fabian Schiller (Japan) Shigekazu Wakisaka	Mercedes-AMG GT3 Evo	MI	87	+5 Laps
22	GT	9	(Germany) GetSpeed	(United States) Anthony Bartone (Germany) Fabian Schiller (Japan) Shigekazu Wakisaka	Mercedes-AMG M159 6.2 L V8	MI	87	+5 Laps
23	GT	21	(Italy) AF Corse	(United Kingdom) Darren Leung (United States) Simon Mann (Italy) Alessio Rovera	Ferrari 296 GT3	MI	87	+5 Laps
23	GT	21	(Italy) AF Corse	(United Kingdom) Darren Leung (United States) Simon Mann (Italy) Alessio Rovera	Ferrari F163CE 3.0 L Turbo V6	MI	87	+5 Laps
24	LMP3	71	(France) 23Events Racing	(Egypt) Ibrahim Badawy (Slovakia) Matúš Ryba (United Kingdom) Terrence Woodward	Ligier JS P325	MI	87	+5 Laps
24	LMP3	71	(France) 23Events Racing	(Egypt) Ibrahim Badawy (Slovakia) Matúš Ryba (United Kingdom) Terrence Woodward	Toyota V35A-FTS 3.5 L Turbo V6	MI	87	+5 Laps
25	GT	92	(Germany) Manthey	(France) François Hériau (Austria) Richard Lietz (Italy) Riccardo Pera	Porsche 911 GT3 R (992)	MI	87	+5 Laps
25	GT	92	(Germany) Manthey	(France) François Hériau (Austria) Richard Lietz (Italy) Riccardo Pera	Porsche M97/80 4.2 L Flat-6	MI	87	+5 Laps
26	GT	11	(United Kingdom) TF Sport	(United Kingdom) Matt Bell (United States) Blake McDonald (Republic of Ireland) James Roe	Chevrolet Corvette Z06 GT3.R	MI	87	+5 Laps
26	GT	11	(United Kingdom) TF Sport	(United Kingdom) Matt Bell (United States) Blake McDonald (Republic of Ireland) James Roe	Chevrolet LT6.R 5.5 L V8	MI	87	+5 Laps
27	LMP3	29	(France) Forestier Racing by VPS	(United Kingdom) Nick Adcock (Brazil) Lucas Fecury (France) Luciano Morano	Ligier JS P325	MI	87	+5 Laps (Note: The No. 29 Forestier Racing by VPS entry received a 5-second penalty due to exceeding the speed limit during the VSC period)
27	LMP3	29	(France) Forestier Racing by VPS	(United Kingdom) Nick Adcock (Brazil) Lucas Fecury (France) Luciano Morano	Toyota V35A-FTS 3.5 L Turbo V6	MI	87	+5 Laps
28	GT	37	(Qatar) QMMF by GetSpeed	(Qatar) Abdulla Al-Khelaifi (Austria) Lucas Auer (Qatar) Ghanim Al-Maadheed	Mercedes-AMG GT3 Evo	MI	87	+5 Laps
28	GT	37	(Qatar) QMMF by GetSpeed	(Qatar) Abdulla Al-Khelaifi (Austria) Lucas Auer (Qatar) Ghanim Al-Maadheed	Mercedes-AMG M159 6.2 L V8	MI	87	+5 Laps
29	LMP3	13	(Poland) Inter Europol Competition	(Saint Kitts and Nevis) Alexander Bukhantsov (Taiwan) Jimmy Chou (Colombia) Henry Cubides Olarte	Ligier JS P325	MI	87	+5 Laps
29	LMP3	13	(Poland) Inter Europol Competition	(Saint Kitts and Nevis) Alexander Bukhantsov (Taiwan) Jimmy Chou (Colombia) Henry Cubides Olarte	Toyota V35A-FTS 3.5 L Turbo V6	MI	87	+5 Laps
30	GT	28	(Belgium) UNX Racing by Team WRT	(Belgium) Mathieu Detry (Belgium) Fabian Duffieux (Brazil) Augusto Farfus	BMW M4 GT3	MI	87	+5 Laps
30	GT	28	(Belgium) UNX Racing by Team WRT	(Belgium) Mathieu Detry (Belgium) Fabian Duffieux (Brazil) Augusto Farfus	BMW P58 3.0 L Turbo I6	MI	87	+5 Laps
31	GT	99	(Malaysia) JMR	(United Kingdom) Ben Green (Malaysia) Prince Jeffri Ibrahim (Australia) Jordan Love	Chevrolet Corvette Z06 GT3.R	MI	87	+5 Laps
31	GT	99	(Malaysia) JMR	(United Kingdom) Ben Green (Malaysia) Prince Jeffri Ibrahim (Australia) Jordan Love	Chevrolet LT6.R 5.5 L V8	MI	87	+5 Laps
32	LMP3	8	(Poland) Team Virage	(India) Aditya Patel (Belgium) Vic Stevens (France) Romain Vozniak	Ligier JS P325	MI	86	+6 Laps
32	LMP3	8	(Poland) Team Virage	(India) Aditya Patel (Belgium) Vic Stevens (France) Romain Vozniak	Toyota V35A-FTS 3.5 L Turbo V6	MI	86	+6 Laps
33	GT	56	(United Kingdom) Ecurie Ecosse Blackthorn	(United Kingdom) Jonathan Adam (Belgium) Kobe Pauwels (Italy) Giacomo Petrobelli	Aston Martin Vantage AMR GT3 Evo	MI	86	+6 Laps
33	GT	56	(United Kingdom) Ecurie Ecosse Blackthorn	(United Kingdom) Jonathan Adam (Belgium) Kobe Pauwels (Italy) Giacomo Petrobelli	Aston Martin M177 4.0 L Turbo V8	MI	86	+6 Laps
34	GT	89	(New Zealand) EBM	(Australia) Martin Berry (United Kingdom) Jamie Day (Belgium) Matisse Lismont	Aston Martin Vantage AMR GT3 Evo	MI	86	+6 Laps
34	GT	89	(New Zealand) EBM	(Australia) Martin Berry (United Kingdom) Jamie Day (Belgium) Matisse Lismont	Aston Martin M177 4.0 L Turbo V8	MI	86	+6 Laps
35	LMP3	85	(France) R-ace GP	(France) Fabien Michal (France) Pierre-Alexandre Provost (Germany) Hugo Schwarze	Duqueine D09	MI	86	+6 Laps
35	LMP3	85	(France) R-ace GP	(France) Fabien Michal (France) Pierre-Alexandre Provost (Germany) Hugo Schwarze	Toyota V35A-FTS 3.5 L Turbo V6	MI	86	+6 Laps
36	GT	77	(Germany) Proton Competition	(Japan) "Bankcy" (Japan) Kiyoto Fujinami (United Kingdom) Harry King	Porsche 911 GT3 R (992)	MI	86	+6 Laps
36	GT	77	(Germany) Proton Competition	(Japan) "Bankcy" (Japan) Kiyoto Fujinami (United Kingdom) Harry King	Porsche M97/80 4.2 L Flat-6	MI	86	+6 Laps
37	LMP3	94	(Denmark) High Class Racing	(Denmark) Philip Lindberg (United Kingdom) Callum Voisin (United Kingdom) Tim Whale	Ligier JS P325	MI	86	+6 Laps
37	LMP3	94	(Denmark) High Class Racing	(Denmark) Philip Lindberg (United Kingdom) Callum Voisin (United Kingdom) Tim Whale	Toyota V35A-FTS 3.5 L Turbo V6	MI	86	+6 Laps
38	GT	59	(United Kingdom) United Autosports	(United Kingdom) Wayne Boyd (Australia) Garnet Patterson (Australia) Mark Rosser	McLaren 720S GT3 Evo	MI	86	+6 Laps
38	GT	59	(United Kingdom) United Autosports	(United Kingdom) Wayne Boyd (Australia) Garnet Patterson (Australia) Mark Rosser	McLaren M840T 4.0 L Turbo V8	MI	86	+6 Laps
39	GT	50	(Thailand) Amerasian Fragrance by AF Racing	(Thailand) Carl Bennett (United States) Gregory Bennett (Italy) Tommaso Mosca	Ferrari 296 GT3	MI	85	+7 Laps
39	GT	50	(Thailand) Amerasian Fragrance by AF Racing	(Thailand) Carl Bennett (United States) Gregory Bennett (Italy) Tommaso Mosca	Ferrari F163CE 3.0 L Turbo V6	MI	85	+7 Laps
40	GT	15	(Switzerland) Kessel Racing	(Italy) Alessandro Balzan (United States) Memo Gidley (United States) Dylan Medler	Ferrari 296 GT3	MI	84	+8 Laps
40	GT	15	(Switzerland) Kessel Racing	(Italy) Alessandro Balzan (United States) Memo Gidley (United States) Dylan Medler	Ferrari F163CE 3.0 L Turbo V6	MI	84	+8 Laps
41	LMP3	1	(Poland) Team Virage	(Algeria) Julien Gerbi (India) Narain Karthikeyan (India) Ajith Kumar	Ligier JS P325	MI	82	+10 Laps
41	LMP3	1	(Poland) Team Virage	(Algeria) Julien Gerbi (India) Narain Karthikeyan (India) Ajith Kumar	Toyota V35A-FTS 3.5 L Turbo V6	MI	82	+10 Laps
42	LMP3	26	(Czech Republic) Bretton Racing	(Spain) Lucas Fluxá (Germany) Lenny Ried (Poland) Jacek Zielonka	Ligier JS P325	MI	80	+12 Laps
42	LMP3	26	(Czech Republic) Bretton Racing	(Spain) Lucas Fluxá (Germany) Lenny Ried (Poland) Jacek Zielonka	Toyota V35A-FTS 3.5 L Turbo V6	MI	80	+12 Laps
43	LMP3	23	(France) 23Events Racing	(United Kingdom) Isaac Barashi (Italy) Matteo Quintarelli (France) Louis Stern	Ligier JS P325	MI	67	+25 Laps
43	LMP3	23	(France) 23Events Racing	(United Kingdom) Isaac Barashi (Italy) Matteo Quintarelli (France) Louis Stern	Toyota V35A-FTS 3.5 L Turbo V6	MI	67	+25 Laps
44	GT	34	Racing Team Turkey	(Republic of Ireland) Charlie Eastwood (Belgium) Tom van Rompuy (Turkey) Salih Yoluç	Chevrolet Corvette Z06 GT3.R	MI	65	+27 Laps (Note: The No. 34 Racing Team Turkey entry received a 5-second penalty due to exceeding the speed limit during the VSC period)
44	GT	34	Racing Team Turkey	(Republic of Ireland) Charlie Eastwood (Belgium) Tom van Rompuy (Turkey) Salih Yoluç	Chevrolet LT6.R 5.5 L V8	MI	65	+27 Laps
Not classified
	GT	10	(Germany) Manthey	(Hong Kong) Antares Au (Austria) Klaus Bachler (Netherlands) Loek Hartog	Porsche 911 GT3 R (992)	MI	16	Collision
	GT	10	(Germany) Manthey	(Hong Kong) Antares Au (Austria) Klaus Bachler (Netherlands) Loek Hartog	Porsche M97/80 4.2 L Flat-6	MI	16	Collision
	GT	66	(Malaysia) JMR	(Malaysia) Prince Abu Bakar Ibrahim (Australia) Yasser Shahin (United Kingdom) Alexander Sims	Chevrolet Corvette Z06 GT3.R	MI	15	Collision
	GT	66	(Malaysia) JMR	(Malaysia) Prince Abu Bakar Ibrahim (Australia) Yasser Shahin (United Kingdom) Alexander Sims	Chevrolet LT6.R 5.5 L V8	MI	15	Collision
	LMP2	45	(Japan) PONOS Racing	(Japan) Kei Cozzolino (Japan) Marino Sato (Japan) Yorikatsu Tsujiko	Oreca 07	MI	0	Withdrew
	LMP2	45	(Japan) PONOS Racing	(Japan) Kei Cozzolino (Japan) Marino Sato (Japan) Yorikatsu Tsujiko	Gibson GK428 4.2 L V8	MI	0	Withdrew

== Notes ==
=== Race 2 ===
Asian Le Mans Series
Previous race: None	2025–26 season	Next race: 4 Hours of Dubai
