= 2026 4 Hours of Abu Dhabi =

Endurance sportscar racing event

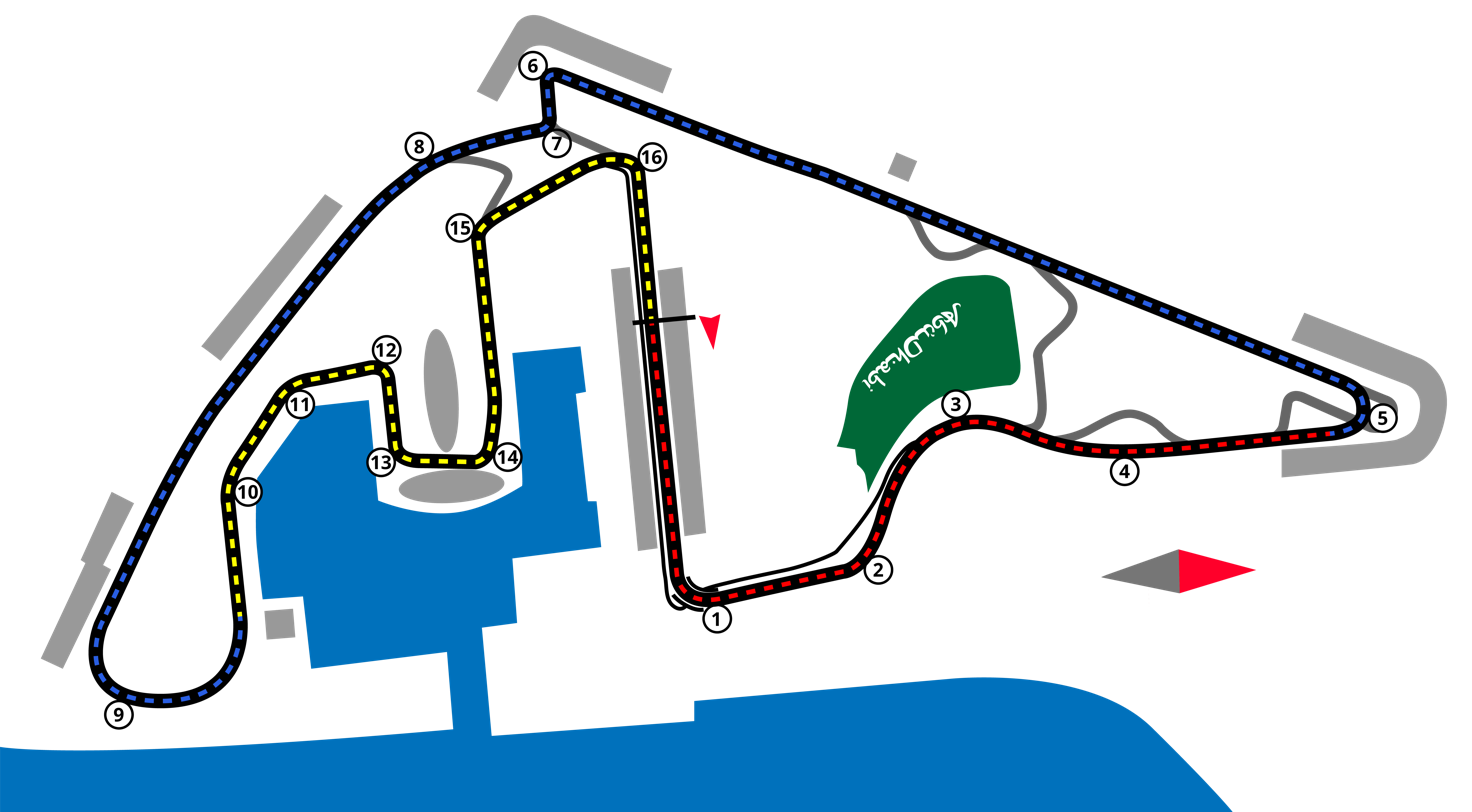
The layout of Yas Marina Circuit

The 2026 4 Hours of Abu Dhabi was an endurance sportscar racing event held between 6 and 8 February 2026 at the Yas Marina Circuit in Abu Dhabi, United Arab Emirates. It was the penultimate and last of six rounds of the 2025–26 Asian Le Mans Series season.

== Entry list ==
The entry list was published on 1 February 2026 and consisted of 46 entries across 3 categories – 16 in LMP2, 10 in LMP3, and 20 in GT.

In the LMP2 class, Fred Poordad will return to the #30 RD Limited Oreca. While in the LMP3 class, Fabien Michal and Pierre-Alexandre Provost are back in the #85 R-ace GP Duqueine with newcomer, Zack Scoular. Elsewhere in LMP3, Haydn Chance and Theo Micouris join Jacek Zielonka in the #26 Bretton Racing Ligier. In GT, Kiyoto Fujinami rejoins the #77 Proton Competition Porsche while Riccardo Agostini and Custodio Toledo are set to compete with Francesco Castellacci in the #54 Vista AF Corse Ferrari.

== Schedule ==
| Date | Time (local: GST) | Event |
|---|---|---|
| Friday, 6 February | 16:00 | Free Practice 1 |
| Friday, 6 February | 19:45 | Free Practice 2 |
| Saturday, 7 February | 10:10 | Qualifying – GT |
| Saturday, 7 February | 10:40 | Qualifying – LMP3 |
| Saturday, 7 February | 11:15 | Qualifying – LMP2 |
| Saturday, 7 February | 15:00 | Race 1 |
| Sunday, 8 February | 16:30 | Race 2 |

== Free practice ==
- Only the fastest car in each class is shown.

| Free Practice 1 | Class | No. | Entrant | Driver | Time |
|---|---|---|---|---|---|
| Free Practice 1 | LMP2 | 43 | (Poland) Inter Europol Competition | (United States) Nolan Siegel | 1:40.966 |
| Free Practice 1 | LMP3 | 8 | (Poland) Team Virage | (Belgium) Vic Stevens | 1:50.478 |
| Free Practice 1 | GT | 59 | (United Kingdom) United Autosports | (United Kingdom) Wayne Boyd | 1:53.420 |
| Free Practice 2 | Class | No. | Entrant | Driver | Time |
| Free Practice 2 | LMP2 | 25 | (Portugal) Algarve Pro Racing | (France) Tom Dillmann | 1:41.290 |
| Free Practice 2 | LMP3 | 23 | (France) 23Events Racing | (Italy) Matteo Quintarelli | 1:50.886 |
| Free Practice 2 | GT | 9 | (Germany) GetSpeed | (Luxembourg) Steve Jans | 1:53.470 |

== Race 1 ==
=== Qualifying ===
==== Qualifying results ====
Pole position winners in each class are marked in bold.

| Pos | Class | No. | Team | Driver | Time | Gap | Grid |
|---|---|---|---|---|---|---|---|
| 1 | **LMP2** | **5** | **(United Kingdom) United Autosports** | **(Italy) Giorgio Roda** | **1:42.179** | — | 1 |
| 2 | LMP2 | 49 | (Denmark) High Class Racing | (Denmark) Jens Reno Møller | 1:42.663 | +0.484 | 2 |
| 3 | LMP2 | 20 | (Portugal) Algarve Pro Racing | (United States) John Falb | 1:42.792 | +0.613 | 3 |
| 4 | LMP2 | 4 | (United States) CrowdStrike Racing by APR | (United States) George Kurtz | 1:43.015 | +0.836 | 4 |
| 5 | LMP2 | 43 | (Poland) Inter Europol Competition | (Greece) Georgios Kolovos | 1:43.026 | +0.847 | 5 |
| 6 | LMP2 | 25 | (Portugal) Algarve Pro Racing | (Denmark) Michael Jensen | 1:43.211 | +1.032 | 6 |
| 7 | LMP2 | 3 | (Luxembourg) DKR Engineering | (Germany) Alexander Mattschull | 1:43.589 | +1.410 | 7 |
| 8 | LMP2 | 6 | (United Kingdom) United Autosports | (Canada) Phil Fayer | 1:43.920 | +1.741 | 8 |
| 9 | LMP2 | 88 | (Germany) Proton Competition | (Austria) Horst Felbermayr Jr. | 1:44.325 | +2.146 | 9 |
| 10 | LMP2 | 22 | (Germany) Proton Competition | (Germany) Stefan Aust | 1:44.364 | +2.185 | 10 |
| 11 | LMP2 | 30 | (France) RD Limited | (United States) Fred Poordad | 1:44.402 | +2.223 | 11 |
| 12 | LMP2 | 45 | (Japan) PONOS Racing | (Japan) Yorikatsu Tsujiko | 1:44.430 | +2.251 | 12 |
| 13 | LMP2 | 70 | (United Kingdom) Vector Sport RLR | (Brazil) Daniel Schneider | 1:44.962 | +2.783 | 13 |
| 14 | LMP2 | 64 | (United Kingdom) Nielsen Racing | (Greece) Kriton Lendoudis | 1:45.032 | +2.853 | 14 |
| 15 | LMP2 | 44 | (Slovakia) ARC Bratislava | (Slovakia) Miro Konôpka | 1:46.509 | +4.330 | 15 |
| 16 | **LMP3** | **17** | **(Switzerland) CLX Motorsport** | **(France) Paul Lanchère** | **1:51.440** | **+9.261** | 17 |
| 17 | LMP3 | 8 | (Poland) Team Virage | (France) Romain Vozniak | 1:51.555 | +9.376 | 18 |
| 18 | LMP3 | 13 | (Poland) Inter Europol Competition | (Saint Kitts and Nevis) Alexander Bukhantsov | 1:51.606 | +9.427 | 19 |
| 19 | LMP3 | 71 | (France) 23Events Racing | (United Kingdom) Terrence Woodward | 1:52.120 | +9.941 | 20 |
| 20 | LMP3 | 85 | (France) R-ace GP | (France) Fabien Michal | 1:52.466 | +10.287 | 21 |
| 21 | LMP3 | 94 | (Denmark) High Class Racing | (United Kingdom) Tim Whale | 1:52.539 | +10.360 | 22 |
| 22 | LMP3 | 29 | (France) Forestier Racing by VPS | (United Kingdom) Nick Adcock | 1:52.796 | +10.617 | 23 |
| 23 | LMP3 | 23 | (France) 23Events Racing | (France) Louis Stern | 1:52.816 | +10.637 | 24 |
| 24 | LMP3 | 26 | (Czech Republic) Bretton Racing | (Poland) Jacek Zielonka | 1:53.021 | +10.842 | 25 |
| 25 | **GT** | **9** | **(Germany) GetSpeed** | **(Luxembourg) Steve Jans** | **1:53.307** | **+11.128** | 27 |
| 26 | GT | 37 | (Qatar) QMMF by GetSpeed | (Qatar) Abdulla Al-Khelaifi | 1:53.382 | +11.203 | 28 |
| 27 | GT | 56 | (United Kingdom) Ecurie Ecosse Blackthorn | (Italy) Giacomo Petrobelli | 1:53.559 | +11.380 | 29 |
| 28 | GT | 74 | (Switzerland) Kessel Racing | (United States) Dustin Blattner | 1:53.836 | +11.657 | 30 |
| 29 | GT | 69 | (Belgium) Team WRT | (United States) Anthony McIntosh | 1:54.017 | +11.838 | 31 |
| 30 | GT | 28 | (Belgium) Team WRT | Rinat Salikhov | 1:54.070 | +11.891 | 32 |
| 31 | GT | 87 | (China) Origine Motorsport | (China) Bo Yuan | 1:54.360 | +12.181 | 33 |
| 32 | GT | 59 | (United Kingdom) United Autosports | (United Arab Emirates) Andrey Mukovoz | 1:54.526 | +12.347 | 34 |
| 33 | GT | 11 | (United Kingdom) TF Sport | (United States) Blake McDonald | 1:54.581 | +12.402 | 35 |
| 34 | GT | 10 | (Germany) Manthey | (Hong Kong) Antares Au | 1:54.861 | +12.682 | 36 |
| 35 | GT | 21 | (Italy) AF Corse | (United Kingdom) Darren Leung | 1:54.891 | +12.712 | 37 |
| 36 | GT | 92 | (Germany) Manthey | (France) François Heriau | 1:54.969 | +12.790 | 38 |
| 37 | GT | 34 | Racing Team Turkey | (Belgium) Tom van Rompuy | 1:55.126 | +12.947 | 39 |
| 38 | LMP3 | 1 | (Poland) Team Virage | (India) Ajith Kumar | 1:55.458 | +13.279 | 26 |
| 39 | GT | 15 | (Switzerland) Kessel Racing | (United States) Memo Gidley | 1:55.542 | +13.363 | 40 |
| 40 | GT | 77 | (Germany) Proton Competition | (Japan) "Bankcy" | 1:55.907 | +13.728 | 41 |
| 41 | GT | 66 | (Malaysia) JMR | (Malaysia) Prince Jefri Ibrahim | 1:56.010 | +13.831 | 42 |
| 42 | GT | 51 | (Italy) AF Corse | (France) Charles-Henri Samani | 1:56.060 | +13.881 | 43 |
| 43 | GT | 54 | (Italy) Vista AF Corse | (Brazil) Custodio Toledo | 1:56.427 | +14.248 | 44 |
| 44 | GT | 50 | (Thailand) Amerasian Fragrance by AF Racing | (United States) Gregory Bennett | 1:57.167 | +14.988 | 45 |
| 45 | LMP2 | 47 | (Italy) Cetilar Racing | No time set | | | 16 |

=== Race ===
==== Race result ====
The minimum number of laps for classification (70% of overall winning car's distance) was 71 laps. Class winners are in bold and ‡.

| Pos | Class | No | Team | Drivers | Chassis | Tyre | Laps | Time/Retired |
| Pos | Class | No | Team | Drivers | Engine | Tyre | Laps | Time/Retired |
|---|---|---|---|---|---|---|---|---|
| 1 | **LMP2** | **4** | **(United States) CrowdStrike Racing by APR** | **(Switzerland) Louis Delétraz** **(Denmark) Malthe Jakobsen** **(United States) George Kurtz** | **Oreca 07** | MI | **133** | **4:01:39.058‡** |
| 1 | **LMP2** | **4** | **(United States) CrowdStrike Racing by APR** | **(Switzerland) Louis Delétraz** **(Denmark) Malthe Jakobsen** **(United States) George Kurtz** | **Gibson GK428 4.2 L V8** | MI | **133** | **4:01:39.058‡** |
| 2 | LMP2 | 20 | (Portugal) Algarve Pro Racing | (United States) John Falb (Liechtenstein) Matthias Kaiser (France) Sami Meguetounif | Oreca 07 | MI | 133 | +2.029 |
| 2 | LMP2 | 20 | (Portugal) Algarve Pro Racing | (United States) John Falb (Liechtenstein) Matthias Kaiser (France) Sami Meguetounif | Gibson GK428 4.2 L V8 | MI | 133 | +2.029 |
| 3 | LMP2 | 30 | (France) RD Limited | (Australia) James Allen (United States) Fred Poordad (France) Tristan Vautier | Oreca 07 | MI | 133 | +25.253 |
| 3 | LMP2 | 30 | (France) RD Limited | (Australia) James Allen (United States) Fred Poordad (France) Tristan Vautier | Gibson GK428 4.2 L V8 | MI | 133 | +25.253 |
| 4 | LMP2 | 3 | (Luxembourg) DKR Engineering | (Switzerland) Mathias Beche (Germany) Alexander Mattschull (Australia) Griffin Peebles | Oreca 07 | MI | 133 | +27.421 |
| 4 | LMP2 | 3 | (Luxembourg) DKR Engineering | (Switzerland) Mathias Beche (Germany) Alexander Mattschull (Australia) Griffin Peebles | Gibson GK428 4.2 L V8 | MI | 133 | +27.421 |
| 5 | LMP2 | 25 | (Portugal) Algarve Pro Racing | (France) Tom Dillmann (Denmark) Michael Jensen (Italy) Enzo Trulli | Oreca 07 | MI | 133 | +28.056 |
| 5 | LMP2 | 25 | (Portugal) Algarve Pro Racing | (France) Tom Dillmann (Denmark) Michael Jensen (Italy) Enzo Trulli | Gibson GK428 4.2 L V8 | MI | 133 | +28.056 |
| 6 | LMP2 | 6 | (United Kingdom) United Autosports | (United Kingdom) Paul di Resta (Canada) Phil Fayer (United Kingdom) Ben Hanley | Oreca 07 | MI | 133 | +34.577 |
| 6 | LMP2 | 6 | (United Kingdom) United Autosports | (United Kingdom) Paul di Resta (Canada) Phil Fayer (United Kingdom) Ben Hanley | Gibson GK428 4.2 L V8 | MI | 133 | +34.577 |
| 7 | LMP2 | 88 | (Germany) Proton Competition | (Austria) Horst Felbermayr Jr. (Austria) Horst Felix Felbermayr (Spain) Lorenzo Fluxá | Oreca 07 | MI | 133 | +52.369 |
| 7 | LMP2 | 88 | (Germany) Proton Competition | (Austria) Horst Felbermayr Jr. (Austria) Horst Felix Felbermayr (Spain) Lorenzo Fluxá | Gibson GK428 4.2 L V8 | MI | 133 | +52.369 |
| 8 | LMP2 | 49 | (Denmark) High Class Racing | (Denmark) Theodor Jensen (United States) Gustavo Menezes (Denmark) Jens Reno Møller | Oreca 07 | MI | 133 | +53.277 |
| 8 | LMP2 | 49 | (Denmark) High Class Racing | (Denmark) Theodor Jensen (United States) Gustavo Menezes (Denmark) Jens Reno Møller | Gibson GK428 4.2 L V8 | MI | 133 | +53.277 |
| 9 | LMP2 | 43 | (Poland) Inter Europol Competition | (United States) Bijoy Garg (Greece) Georgios Kolovos (United States) Nolan Siegel | Oreca 07 | MI | 133 | +1:20.546 |
| 9 | LMP2 | 43 | (Poland) Inter Europol Competition | (United States) Bijoy Garg (Greece) Georgios Kolovos (United States) Nolan Siegel | Gibson GK428 4.2 L V8 | MI | 133 | +1:20.546 |
| 10 | LMP2 | 70 | (United Kingdom) Vector Sport RLR | (United States) Jacob Abel (Grenada) Vladislav Lomko (Brazil) Daniel Schneider | Oreca 07 | MI | 132 | +1 Lap |
| 10 | LMP2 | 70 | (United Kingdom) Vector Sport RLR | (United States) Jacob Abel (Grenada) Vladislav Lomko (Brazil) Daniel Schneider | Gibson GK428 4.2 L V8 | MI | 132 | +1 Lap |
| 11 | LMP2 | 47 | (Italy) Cetilar Racing | (Italy) Antonio Fuoco (Italy) Roberto Lacorte (France) Charles Milesi | Oreca 07 | MI | 132 | +1 Lap |
| 11 | LMP2 | 47 | (Italy) Cetilar Racing | (Italy) Antonio Fuoco (Italy) Roberto Lacorte (France) Charles Milesi | Gibson GK428 4.2 L V8 | MI | 132 | +1 Lap |
| 12 | LMP2 | 45 | (Japan) PONOS Racing | (Japan) Kei Cozzolino (Japan) Marino Sato (Japan) Yorikatsu Tsujiko | Oreca 07 | MI | 132 | +1 Lap |
| 12 | LMP2 | 45 | (Japan) PONOS Racing | (Japan) Kei Cozzolino (Japan) Marino Sato (Japan) Yorikatsu Tsujiko | Gibson GK428 4.2 L V8 | MI | 132 | +1 Lap |
| 13 | LMP2 | 22 | (Germany) Proton Competition | (Germany) Stefan Aust (Germany) Felipe Fernández Laser (Germany) Jonas Ried | Oreca 07 | MI | 132 | +1 Lap |
| 13 | LMP2 | 22 | (Germany) Proton Competition | (Germany) Stefan Aust (Germany) Felipe Fernández Laser (Germany) Jonas Ried | Gibson GK428 4.2 L V8 | MI | 132 | +1 Lap |
| 14 | LMP2 | 64 | (United Kingdom) Nielsen Racing | (Turkey) Cem Bölükbaşı (Greece) Kriton Lendoudis (United Kingdom) Alex Quinn | Oreca 07 | MI | 132 | +1 Lap |
| 14 | LMP2 | 64 | (United Kingdom) Nielsen Racing | (Turkey) Cem Bölükbaşı (Greece) Kriton Lendoudis (United Kingdom) Alex Quinn | Gibson GK428 4.2 L V8 | MI | 132 | +1 Lap |
| 15 | **LMP3** | **17** | **(Switzerland) CLX Motorsport** | **(United States) Alexander Jacoby** **(France) Paul Lanchère** **(Switzerland) Kévin Rabin** | **Ligier JS P325** | MI | **123** | **+10 Laps‡** |
| 15 | **LMP3** | **17** | **(Switzerland) CLX Motorsport** | **(United States) Alexander Jacoby** **(France) Paul Lanchère** **(Switzerland) Kévin Rabin** | **Toyota V35A-FTS 3.5 L Turbo V6** | MI | **123** | **+10 Laps‡** |
| 16 | LMP3 | 23 | (France) 23Events Racing | (United Kingdom) Isaac Barashi (Italy) Matteo Quintarelli (France) Louis Stern | Ligier JS P325 | MI | 123 | +10 Laps |
| 16 | LMP3 | 23 | (France) 23Events Racing | (United Kingdom) Isaac Barashi (Italy) Matteo Quintarelli (France) Louis Stern | Toyota V35A-FTS 3.5 L Turbo V6 | MI | 123 | +10 Laps |
| 17 | LMP3 | 29 | (France) Forestier Racing by VPS | (United Kingdom) Nick Adcock (Brazil) Lucas Fecury (France) Luciano Morano | Ligier JS P325 | MI | 123 | +10 Laps |
| 17 | LMP3 | 29 | (France) Forestier Racing by VPS | (United Kingdom) Nick Adcock (Brazil) Lucas Fecury (France) Luciano Morano | Toyota V35A-FTS 3.5 L Turbo V6 | MI | 123 | +10 Laps |
| 18 | LMP3 | 85 | (France) R-ace GP | (France) Fabien Michal (Luxembourg) Pierre-Alexandre Provost (New Zealand) Zack Scoular | Duqueine D09 | MI | 123 | +10 Laps |
| 18 | LMP3 | 85 | (France) R-ace GP | (France) Fabien Michal (Luxembourg) Pierre-Alexandre Provost (New Zealand) Zack Scoular | Toyota V35A-FTS 3.5 L Turbo V6 | MI | 123 | +10 Laps |
| 19 | LMP3 | 8 | (Poland) Team Virage | (India) Aditya Patel (Belgium) Vic Stevens (France) Romain Vozniak | Ligier JS P325 | MI | 123 | +10 Laps |
| 19 | LMP3 | 8 | (Poland) Team Virage | (India) Aditya Patel (Belgium) Vic Stevens (France) Romain Vozniak | Toyota V35A-FTS 3.5 L Turbo V6 | MI | 123 | +10 Laps |
| 20 | LMP3 | 71 | (France) 23Events Racing | (Egypt) Ibrahim Badawy (Slovakia) Matúš Ryba (United Kingdom) Terrence Woodward | Ligier JS P325 | MI | 123 | +10 Laps |
| 20 | LMP3 | 71 | (France) 23Events Racing | (Egypt) Ibrahim Badawy (Slovakia) Matúš Ryba (United Kingdom) Terrence Woodward | Toyota V35A-FTS 3.5 L Turbo V6 | MI | 123 | +10 Laps |
| 21 | **GT** | **69** | **(Belgium) Team WRT** | **(United Kingdom) Dan Harper** **(United States) Anthony McIntosh** **(Canada) Parker Thompson** | **BMW M4 GT3** | MI | **122** | **+11 Laps‡** |
| 21 | **GT** | **69** | **(Belgium) Team WRT** | **(United Kingdom) Dan Harper** **(United States) Anthony McIntosh** **(Canada) Parker Thompson** | **BMW P58 3.0 L Turbo I6** | MI | **122** | **+11 Laps‡** |
| 22 | GT | 28 | (Belgium) Team WRT | (Brazil) Augusto Farfus (Italy) Gabriele Piana; Rinat Salikhov | BMW M4 GT3 | MI | 122 | +11 Laps |
| 22 | GT | 28 | (Belgium) Team WRT | (Brazil) Augusto Farfus (Italy) Gabriele Piana; Rinat Salikhov | BMW P58 3.0 L Turbo I6 | MI | 122 | +11 Laps |
| 23 | GT | 74 | (Switzerland) Kessel Racing | (United States) Dustin Blattner (United Kingdom) Chris Lulham (Germany) Dennis Marschall | Ferrari 296 GT3 | MI | 122 | +11 Laps |
| 23 | GT | 74 | (Switzerland) Kessel Racing | (United States) Dustin Blattner (United Kingdom) Chris Lulham (Germany) Dennis Marschall | Ferrari F163CE 3.0 L Turbo V6 | MI | 122 | +11 Laps |
| 24 | GT | 87 | (China) Origine Motorsport | (Germany) Laurin Heinrich (China) Leo Ye Hongli (China) Bo Yuan | Porsche 911 GT3 R (992) | MI | 122 | +11 Laps |
| 24 | GT | 87 | (China) Origine Motorsport | (Germany) Laurin Heinrich (China) Leo Ye Hongli (China) Bo Yuan | Porsche M97/80 4.2 L Flat-6 | MI | 122 | +11 Laps |
| 25 | GT | 37 | (Qatar) QMMF by GetSpeed | (Qatar) Abdulla Al-Khelaifi (Austria) Lucas Auer (Qatar) Ghanim Al-Maadheed | Mercedes-AMG GT3 Evo | MI | 122 | +11 Laps |
| 25 | GT | 37 | (Qatar) QMMF by GetSpeed | (Qatar) Abdulla Al-Khelaifi (Austria) Lucas Auer (Qatar) Ghanim Al-Maadheed | Mercedes-AMG M159 6.2 L V8 | MI | 122 | +11 Laps |
| 26 | LMP3 | 26 | (Czech Republic) Bretton Racing | (United Kingdom) Haydn Chance (United Kingdom) Theo Micouris (Poland) Jacek Zielonka | Ligier JS P325 | MI | 121 | +12 Laps |
| 26 | LMP3 | 26 | (Czech Republic) Bretton Racing | (United Kingdom) Haydn Chance (United Kingdom) Theo Micouris (Poland) Jacek Zielonka | Toyota V35A-FTS 3.5 L Turbo V6 | MI | 121 | +12 Laps |
| 27 | GT | 21 | (Italy) AF Corse | (United Kingdom) Darren Leung (United States) Simon Mann (Italy) Alessio Rovera | Ferrari 296 GT3 | MI | 121 | +12 Laps |
| 27 | GT | 21 | (Italy) AF Corse | (United Kingdom) Darren Leung (United States) Simon Mann (Italy) Alessio Rovera | Ferrari F163CE 3.0 L Turbo V6 | MI | 121 | +12 Laps |
| 28 | GT | 92 | (Germany) Manthey | (France) François Heriau (Austria) Richard Lietz (Italy) Riccardo Pera | Porsche 911 GT3 R (992) | MI | 121 | +12 Laps |
| 28 | GT | 92 | (Germany) Manthey | (France) François Heriau (Austria) Richard Lietz (Italy) Riccardo Pera | Porsche M97/80 4.2 L Flat-6 | MI | 121 | +12 Laps |
| 29 | GT | 56 | (United Kingdom) Ecurie Ecosse Blackthorn | (United Kingdom) Jonathan Adam (Belgium) Kobe Pauwels (Italy) Giacomo Petrobelli | Aston Martin Vantage AMR GT3 Evo | MI | 121 | +12 Laps |
| 29 | GT | 56 | (United Kingdom) Ecurie Ecosse Blackthorn | (United Kingdom) Jonathan Adam (Belgium) Kobe Pauwels (Italy) Giacomo Petrobelli | Aston Martin M177 4.0 L Turbo V8 | MI | 121 | +12 Laps |
| 30 | GT | 10 | (Germany) Manthey | (Hong Kong) Antares Au (Austria) Klaus Bachler (Netherlands) Loek Hartog | Porsche 911 GT3 R (992) | MI | 121 | +12 Laps |
| 30 | GT | 10 | (Germany) Manthey | (Hong Kong) Antares Au (Austria) Klaus Bachler (Netherlands) Loek Hartog | Porsche M97/80 4.2 L Flat-6 | MI | 121 | +12 Laps |
| 31 | GT | 11 | (United Kingdom) TF Sport | (United Kingdom) Matt Bell (United States) Blake McDonald (Republic of Ireland) James Roe | Chevrolet Corvette Z06 GT3.R | MI | 120 | +13 Laps |
| 31 | GT | 11 | (United Kingdom) TF Sport | (United Kingdom) Matt Bell (United States) Blake McDonald (Republic of Ireland) James Roe | Chevrolet LT6.R 5.5 L V8 | MI | 120 | +13 Laps |
| 32 | GT | 15 | (Switzerland) Kessel Racing | (Italy) Alessandro Balzan (United States) Memo Gidley (United States) Dylan Medler | Ferrari 296 GT3 | MI | 120 | +13 Laps |
| 32 | GT | 15 | (Switzerland) Kessel Racing | (Italy) Alessandro Balzan (United States) Memo Gidley (United States) Dylan Medler | Ferrari F163CE 3.0 L Turbo V6 | MI | 120 | +13 Laps |
| 33 | GT | 66 | (Malaysia) Johor Motorsports JMR | (Malaysia) Prince Abu Bakar Ibrahim (Malaysia) Prince Jefri Ibrahim (Australia) Yasser Shahin | Chevrolet Corvette Z06 GT3.R | MI | 120 | +13 Laps |
| 33 | GT | 66 | (Malaysia) Johor Motorsports JMR | (Malaysia) Prince Abu Bakar Ibrahim (Malaysia) Prince Jefri Ibrahim (Australia) Yasser Shahin | Chevrolet LT6.R 5.5 L V8 | MI | 120 | +13 Laps |
| 34 | GT | 77 | (Germany) Proton Competition | (Japan) "Bankcy" (Netherlands) Huub van Eijndhoven (United Kingdom) Harry King | Porsche 911 GT3 R (992) | MI | 120 | +13 Laps |
| 34 | GT | 77 | (Germany) Proton Competition | (Japan) "Bankcy" (Netherlands) Huub van Eijndhoven (United Kingdom) Harry King | Porsche M97/80 4.2 L Flat-6 | MI | 120 | +13 Laps |
| 35 | GT | 50 | (Thailand) Amerasian Fragrance by AF Racing | (Thailand) Carl Bennett (United States) Gregory Bennett (Italy) Tommaso Mosca | Ferrari 296 GT3 | MI | 119 | +14 Laps |
| 35 | GT | 50 | (Thailand) Amerasian Fragrance by AF Racing | (Thailand) Carl Bennett (United States) Gregory Bennett (Italy) Tommaso Mosca | Ferrari F163CE 3.0 L Turbo V6 | MI | 119 | +14 Laps |
| 36 | GT | 59 | (United Kingdom) United Autosports | (United Kingdom) Wayne Boyd (United Arab Emirates) Andrey Mukovoz (Slovenia) Alexey Nesov | McLaren 720S GT3 Evo | MI | 119 | +14 Laps |
| 36 | GT | 59 | (United Kingdom) United Autosports | (United Kingdom) Wayne Boyd (United Arab Emirates) Andrey Mukovoz (Slovenia) Alexey Nesov | McLaren M840T 4.0 L Turbo V8 | MI | 119 | +14 Laps |
| 37 | GT | 54 | (Italy) Vista AF Corse | (Italy) Riccardo Agostini (Italy) Francesco Castellacci (Brazil) Custodio Toledo | Ferrari 296 GT3 | MI | 119 | +14 Laps |
| 37 | GT | 54 | (Italy) Vista AF Corse | (Italy) Riccardo Agostini (Italy) Francesco Castellacci (Brazil) Custodio Toledo | Ferrari F163CE 3.0 L Turbo V6 | MI | 119 | +14 Laps |
| 38 | GT | 51 | (Italy) AF Corse | (Indonesia) Sean Gelael (Italy) Davide Rigon (France) Charles-Henri Samani | Ferrari 296 GT3 | MI | 119 | +14 Laps |
| 38 | GT | 51 | (Italy) AF Corse | (Indonesia) Sean Gelael (Italy) Davide Rigon (France) Charles-Henri Samani | Ferrari F163CE 3.0 L Turbo V6 | MI | 119 | +14 Laps |
Not classified
| | LMP3 | 1 | (Poland) Team Virage | (Algeria) Julien Gerbi (India) Narain Karthikeyan (India) Ajith Kumar | Ligier JS P325 | MI | 117 | Accident damage |
| | LMP3 | 1 | (Poland) Team Virage | (Algeria) Julien Gerbi (India) Narain Karthikeyan (India) Ajith Kumar | Toyota V35A-FTS 3.5 L Turbo V6 | MI | 117 | Accident damage |
| | LMP2 | 44 | (Slovakia) ARC Bratislava | (France) Yann Ehrlacher (Slovakia) Miro Konôpka (France) Matthieu Vaxivière | Oreca 07 | MI | 99 | Did not finish |
| | LMP2 | 44 | (Slovakia) ARC Bratislava | (France) Yann Ehrlacher (Slovakia) Miro Konôpka (France) Matthieu Vaxivière | Gibson GK428 4.2 L V8 | MI | 99 | Did not finish |
| | GT | 9 | (Germany) GetSpeed | (United States) Anthony Bartone (Luxembourg) Steve Jans (Germany) Fabian Schiller | Mercedes-AMG GT3 Evo | MI | 93 | Engine |
| | GT | 9 | (Germany) GetSpeed | (United States) Anthony Bartone (Luxembourg) Steve Jans (Germany) Fabian Schiller | Mercedes-AMG M159 6.2 L V8 | MI | 93 | Engine |
| | LMP2 | 5 | (United Kingdom) United Autosports | (Denmark) Mikkel Jensen (Italy) Giorgio Roda (Switzerland) Grégoire Saucy | Oreca 07 | MI | 92 | Mechanical |
| | LMP2 | 5 | (United Kingdom) United Autosports | (Denmark) Mikkel Jensen (Italy) Giorgio Roda (Switzerland) Grégoire Saucy | Gibson GK428 4.2 L V8 | MI | 92 | Mechanical |
| | GT | 34 | Racing Team Turkey | (Republic of Ireland) Charlie Eastwood (Belgium) Tom Van Rompuy (Turkey) Salih Yoluç | Chevrolet Corvette Z06 GT3.R | MI | 90 | Mechanical |
| | GT | 34 | Racing Team Turkey | (Republic of Ireland) Charlie Eastwood (Belgium) Tom Van Rompuy (Turkey) Salih Yoluç | Chevrolet LT6.R 5.5 L V8 | MI | 90 | Mechanical |
| | LMP3 | 94 | (Denmark) High Class Racing | (Denmark) Philip Lindberg (United Kingdom) Callum Voisin (United Kingdom) Tim Whale | Ligier JS P325 | MI | 37 | Contact |
| | LMP3 | 94 | (Denmark) High Class Racing | (Denmark) Philip Lindberg (United Kingdom) Callum Voisin (United Kingdom) Tim Whale | Toyota V35A-FTS 3.5 L Turbo V6 | MI | 37 | Contact |
| | LMP3 | 13 | (Poland) Inter Europol Competition | (Saint Kitts and Nevis) Alexander Bukhantsov (Taiwan) Jimmy Chou (Colombia) Henry Cubides Olarte | Ligier JS P325 | MI | 124 | Disqualified |
| | LMP3 | 13 | (Poland) Inter Europol Competition | (Saint Kitts and Nevis) Alexander Bukhantsov (Taiwan) Jimmy Chou (Colombia) Henry Cubides Olarte | Toyota V35A-FTS 3.5 L Turbo V6 | MI | 124 | Disqualified |

Asian Le Mans Series
| Previous race: 4 Hours of Dubai | 2025–26 season | Next race: none |
