= 2024 Lamborghini Super Trofeo North America =

12th season of a one-make racing series by Lamborghini

The 2024 Lamborghini Super Trofeo North America was the twelfth season of Lamborghini Super Trofeo North America. The season began on March 13 at Sebring and concluded on November 15 with the World Final at Jerez, featuring six rounds.

== Calendar ==
Rnd.	Circuit	Date	Supporting
1	Sebring International Raceway, Sebring, Florida	March 13–16	IMSA SportsCar Championship
2	WeatherTech Raceway Laguna Seca, Monterey, California	May 10–12	IMSA SportsCar Championship
3	(New York (state)) Watkins Glen International, Watkins Glen, New York	June 21–23	IMSA SportsCar Championship
4	Circuit of the Americas, Austin, Texas	August 31 – September 1	World Endurance Championship
5	Indianapolis Motor Speedway, Speedway, Indiana	September 20–22	IMSA SportsCar Championship
6	(Spain) Circuito de Jerez – Ángel Nieto, Jerez de la Frontera	November 14–15	Lamborghini Super Trofeo World Final

== Entry list ==
All teams use the Lamborghini Huracán Super Trofeo Evo2.

Team	Dealership	No.	Drivers	Class	Rounds
Auto Technic Racing	(Florida) Palm Beach	02	(United States) Mark Brummond	LB	1, 3
Auto Technic Racing	(Florida) Palm Beach	23	(United States) Christopher Tasca	LB	1
TPC Racing	(Florida) Palm Beach	02	(United States) Mark Brummond	LB	4
TPC Racing	(Texas) Austin	21	(United States) Shehan Chandrasoma	PA	1–4
TPC Racing	(Texas) Austin	21	(United States) Nikko Reger	PA	1–4
TPC Racing	(Florida) Miami	34	(United States) Christopher Tasca	LB	2
Wayne Taylor Racing with Andretti	(Florida) Palm Beach	1	(United States) Ryan Norman	P	1–4
Wayne Taylor Racing with Andretti	(Florida) Palm Beach	1	(Costa Rica) Danny Formal	P	1–4
Wayne Taylor Racing with Andretti	(Florida) Palm Beach	8	(United States) Nate Stacy	PA	1–4
Wayne Taylor Racing with Andretti	(Florida) Palm Beach	8	(United States) Nick Persing	PA	1–4
Wayne Taylor Racing with Andretti	(Florida) Palm Beach	10	(United States) Graham Doyle	Am	1–4
Wayne Taylor Racing with Andretti	(Florida) Palm Beach	10	(United States) Ashton Harrison	Am	2–4
Wayne Taylor Racing with Andretti	(Florida) Palm Beach	32	(United States) Naveen Rao	LB	1
Wayne Taylor Racing with Andretti	(Florida) Palm Beach	69	(United States) Anthony McIntosh	Am	1–4
Wayne Taylor Racing with Andretti	(Florida) Palm Beach	69	(United States) Glenn McGee	Am	1–4
Ansa Motorsports	(Florida) Broward	4	(France) Nico Jamin	P	1–4
Ansa Motorsports	(Florida) Broward	4	(Brazil) Kiko Porto	P	1–4
Ansa Motorsports	(Florida) Broward	7	(United States) Alexandre Lima	LB	1–3
Ansa Motorsports	(Florida) Broward	7	(Colombia) David Esteban Cárdenas	LB	2–3
Ansa Motorsports	(Florida) Broward	24	(United States) Ron Atapattu	Am	1–2
Ansa Motorsports	(Florida) Broward	24	(United States) Kevin Madsen	Am	1–2
Ansa Motorsports	(Florida) Broward	24	(Colombia) David Esteban Cárdenas	Am	4
Ansa Motorsports	(Florida) Broward	30	(United States) Bryson Morris	P	1–4
Ansa Motorsports	(Florida) Broward	30	(France) Loris Cabirou	P	1–4
Ansa Motorsports	(Florida) Broward	94	(United States) Stephen Sorbaro	LB	3–4
Precision Performance Motorsports	(Florida) Palm Beach	9	(United States) Wesley Slimp	PA	1–4
Precision Performance Motorsports	(Florida) Palm Beach	9	(United States) Tyler Hoffman	PA	1–4
Precision Performance Motorsports	(Florida) Palm Beach	45	(United States) Rob Walker	Am	1–4
Precision Performance Motorsports	(Florida) Palm Beach	46	(United States) JCD Dubets	PA	1–4
Precision Performance Motorsports	(Florida) Palm Beach	46	(United States) David Staab	PA	1
Precision Performance Motorsports	(Florida) Palm Beach	46	(United States) Tom Capizzi	PA	2–4
Precision Performance Motorsports	(Florida) Palm Beach	47	(United States) Dominic Starkweather	Am	1–4
Precision Performance Motorsports	(Florida) Palm Beach	48	(United States) Michael Staab	LB	1–4
Topp Racing	(Texas) San Antonio	11	(United States) Raymond Davoudi	LB	1–3
Topp Racing	(Texas) Austin	17	(United States) Cole Kleck	Am	4
Topp Racing	(Texas) Austin	17	(United States) Al Morey	Am	4
Topp Racing	(Massachusetts) Boston	99	(United States) Rocky T Bolduc	LB	3–4
One Motorsports	(California) Newport Beach	12	(United States) Anthony Bullock	Am	1–4
One Motorsports	(California) Newport Beach	57	(United States) Nick Groat	LB	1–4
Forte Racing	(California) Rancho Mirage	13	(United States) Ofir Levy	LB	1–3
Forte Racing	(California) Rancho Mirage	86	(United States) Jon Hirshberg	LB	1–4
Forte Racing	(California) Beverly Hills	27	(United States) Ken Dobson	Am	1–2, 4
Forte Racing	(California) Beverly Hills	27	(United States) Alan Fudge	Am	2
Forte Racing	(California) Beverly Hills	27	(United States) Courtney Crone	Am	4
Forte Racing	(California) Beverly Hills	70	(United States) Jay Logan	PA	3–4
Forte Racing	(California) Beverly Hills	70	(France) Alexandre Prémat	PA	3–4
Forte Racing	(California) Beverly Hills	72	(United States) Blake McDonald	PA	1
Forte Racing	(California) Beverly Hills	72	(United States) Patrick Liddy	PA	1
Forte Racing	(California) Beverly Hills	72	(United States) Patrick Liddy	P	2–3
Forte Racing	(Texas) Dallas	50	(United States) Mark Wilgus	Am	2–3
Forte Racing	(Texas) Dallas	50	(United States) Mark Wilgus	PA	4
Forte Racing	(Texas) Dallas	50	(United States) Connor Bloum	PA	4
Forte Racing	(Texas) Dallas	71	(United States) Brady Golan	PA	4
Forte Racing	(Texas) Dallas	71	(Australia) Cameron Shields	PA	4
Forte Racing	(California) Newport Beach	65	(United States) Ray Shahi	LB	2, 4
Forte Racing	(California) San Diego	72	(United States) Blake McDonald	PA	4
Forte Racing	(California) San Diego	72	(United States) Patrick Liddy	PA	4
Flying Lizard Motorsports	(California) Newport Beach	14	(United States) Slade Stewart	PA	1–4
Flying Lizard Motorsports	(California) Newport Beach	14	(United States) Andy Lee	PA	1–4
Flying Lizard Motorsports	(California) Newport Beach	41	(United States) Marc Miller	PA	2–4
Flying Lizard Motorsports	(California) Newport Beach	41	(United States) Paul Nemschoff	PA	2–4
Flying Lizard Motorsports	(California) Newport Beach	54	(Netherlands) Jeroen Bleekemolen	PA	1–4
Flying Lizard Motorsports	(California) Newport Beach	54	(United States) Tim Pappas	PA	1–4
Flying Lizard Motorsports	(California) Newport Beach	98	(United States) Sam Shi	Am	1–4
World Speed	(California) Walnut Creek	15	(United States) Cam Aliabadi	PA	2
World Speed	(California) Walnut Creek	15	(United States) Jaden Conwright	PA	2
World Speed	(California) Walnut Creek	22	(United States) Scott Huffaker	P	2
World Speed	Hawaii	22	(United States) Scott Huffaker	PA	1
World Speed	Hawaii	22	(United States) Courtney Crone	PA	1
World Speed	(California) San Francisco	22	(United States) Scott Huffaker	P	3
World Speed	(California) San Francisco	22	(United States) Scott Huffaker	PA	4
Alliance Racing	(Florida) Palm Beach	25	(United States) Andre Lagartixa	Am	1–4
Alliance Racing	(Florida) Palm Beach	25	(United States) Robert Soroka	Am	1–3
Alliance Racing	(Florida) Palm Beach	28	(United States) Al Morey	Am	1–3
Alliance Racing	(Florida) Palm Beach	28	(United States) William Edwards	Am	1, 4
Alliance Racing	(Florida) Palm Beach	28	(United States) Cole Kleck	Am	2–3
TR3 Racing	(Florida) Orlando	29	(United States) Elias De La Torre	P	2, 4
TR3 Racing	(Florida) Miami	33	(United States) Clayton Wilson	LB	4
TR3 Racing	(Florida) Miami	34	(United States) Rodrigo Vales	LB	1–4
TR3 Racing	(Florida) Miami	34	(United States) Rogelio Perusquia	LB	1–3
TR3 Racing	(Florida) Miami	88	(South Africa) Giano Taurino	P	1–4
TR3 Racing	(Florida) Miami	88	(United States) Ernie Francis Jr.	P	1–4
MLT Motorsports	(Connecticut) Greenwich	42	(United States) Adrian Kunzle	Am	1–4
MLT Motorsports	(Connecticut) Greenwich	42	(United States) Jason Rabe	Am	1–2
MLT Motorsports	(Connecticut) Greenwich	42	(United States) Kevin Madsen	Am	3–4
MLT Motorsports	(Florida) Naples	64	(United States) Garrett Adams	PA	1–4
MLT Motorsports	(Florida) Naples	64	(United States) Luke Berkeley	PA	1–4
Forty7 Motorsports	(Pennsylvania) Philadelphia	44	(United States) Andrew Strobert	LB	2, 4
Forty7 Motorsports	(Pennsylvania) Philadelphia	66	(United States) AJ Muss	PA	1–4
Forty7 Motorsports	(Pennsylvania) Philadelphia	66	(United States) Joel Miller	PA	1–4
Forty7 Motorsports	(Pennsylvania) Philadelphia	77	(United States) Jake Walker	P	1–4
Forty7 Motorsports	(Pennsylvania) Philadelphia	77	(United States) Keawn Tandon	P	3–4
Forty7 Motorsports	(Connecticut) Greenwich	55	(United States) Lane Vacala	Am	1
Forty7 Motorsports	(Connecticut) Greenwich	55	(United States) Keawn Tandon	PA	2
Forty7 Motorsports	(Connecticut) Greenwich	55	(United States) Lane Vacala	PA	2
Forty7 Motorsports	(Connecticut) Greenwich	55	(United States) Andrew Strobert	LB	3
Forty7 Motorsports	(Connecticut) Greenwich	55	(United States) Christopher Tasca	LB	4

Icon	Class
P	Pro Cup
PA	Pro-Am Cup
Am	Am Cup
LB	LB Cup

== Race results ==
Bold indicates overall winner.

Round		Circuit	Pro Winner	Pro-Am Winner	Am Winner	LB Cup Winner	Report
1	R1	(Florida) Sebring International Raceway	**No. 4 Ansa Motorsports**	No. 8 Wayne Taylor Racing with Andretti	No. 27 Forte Racing	No. 02 Auto Technic Racing	Report
1	R1	(Florida) Sebring International Raceway	**(France) Nico Jamin** **(Brazil) Kiko Porto**	(United States) Nate Stacy (United States) Nick Persing	(United States) Ken Dobson	(United States) Mark Brummond	Report
1	R2	(Florida) Sebring International Raceway	**No. 88 TR3 Racing**	No. 54 Flying Lizard Motorsports	No. 27 Forte Racing	No. 32 Wayne Taylor Racing with Andretti	Report
1	R2	(Florida) Sebring International Raceway	**(South Africa) Giano Taurino** **(United States) Ernie Francis Jr.**	(Netherlands) Jeroen Bleekemolen (United States) Tim Pappas	(United States) Ken Dobson	(United States) Naveen Rao	Report
2	R1	(California) WeatherTech Raceway Laguna Seca	**No. 4 Ansa Motorsports**	No. 14 Flying Lizard Motorsports	No. 28 Alliance Racing	No. 48 Precision Performance Motorsports	Report
2	R1	(California) WeatherTech Raceway Laguna Seca	**(France) Nico Jamin** **(Brazil) Kiko Porto**	(United States) Slade Stewart (United States) Andy Lee	(United States) Al Morey (United States) Cole Kleck	(United States) Michael Staab	Report
2	R2	(California) WeatherTech Raceway Laguna Seca	**No. 4 Ansa Motorsports**	No. 8 Wayne Taylor Racing with Andretti	No. 69 Wayne Taylor Racing with Andretti	No. 48 Precision Performance Motorsports	Report
2	R2	(California) WeatherTech Raceway Laguna Seca	**(France) Nico Jamin** **(Brazil) Kiko Porto**	(United States) Nate Stacy (United States) Nick Persing	(United States) Anthony McIntosh (United States) Glenn McGee	(United States) Michael Staab	Report
3	R1	(New York (state)) Watkins Glen International	**No. 1 Wayne Taylor Racing with Andretti**	No. 21 TPC Racing	No. 47 Precision Performance Motorsports	No. 57 One Motorsports	Report
3	R1	(New York (state)) Watkins Glen International	**(Costa Rica) Danny Formal** **(United States) Ryan Norman**	(United States) Nikko Reger (United States) Shehan Chandrasoma	(United States) Dominic Starkweather	(United States) Nick Groat	Report
3	R2	(New York (state)) Watkins Glen International	**No. 88 TR3 Racing**	No. 66 Forty7 Motorsports	No. 12 One Motorsports	No. 57 One Motorsports	Report
3	R2	(New York (state)) Watkins Glen International	**(South Africa) Giano Taurino** **(United States) Ernie Francis Jr.**	(United States) AJ Muss (United States) Joel Miller	(United States) Anthony Bullock	(United States) Nick Groat	Report
4	R1	(Texas) Circuit of the Americas	**No. 88 TR3 Racing**	No. 8 Wayne Taylor Racing with Andretti	No. 69 Wayne Taylor Racing with Andretti	No. 34 TR3 Racing	Report
4	R1	(Texas) Circuit of the Americas	**(South Africa) Giano Taurino** **(United States) Ernie Francis Jr.**	(United States) Nate Stacy (United States) Nick Persing	(United States) Anthony McIntosh (United States) Glenn McGee	(United States) Rodrigo Vales	Report
4	R2	(Texas) Circuit of the Americas	**No. 1 Wayne Taylor Racing with Andretti**	No. 8 Wayne Taylor Racing with Andretti	No. 69 Wayne Taylor Racing with Andretti	No. 34 TR3 Racing	Report
4	R2	(Texas) Circuit of the Americas	**(Costa Rica) Danny Formal** **(United States) Ryan Norman**	(United States) Nate Stacy (United States) Nick Persing	(United States) Anthony McIntosh (United States) Glenn McGee	(United States) Rodrigo Vales	Report
5	R1	(Indiana) Indianapolis Motor Speedway					
5	R2	(Indiana) Indianapolis Motor Speedway					
6	R1	(Spain) Circuito de Jerez – Ángel Nieto					
6	R2	(Spain) Circuito de Jerez – Ángel Nieto					

== Championship standings ==
=== Points system ===
Championship points are awarded in each class at the finish of each event. Points are awarded based on finishing positions in the race as shown in the chart below.

Position	1	2	3	4	5	6	7	8	9	10	Pole
Race	15	12	10	8	6	5	4	3	2	1	1

Pole Position bonus point is not awarded if the starting grid is determined by “Other Means”.

For teams and dealerships championship, each team or dealership takes the points of 2 (two) highest-placing entries within class. 1 (one) additional point is also awarded for each Class Pole Position in each race.

=== Driver Championship ===
Pos.	Drivers	SEB (Florida)		LGA (California)		WGL (New York (state))		COTA (Texas)		IMS (Indiana)	JER (Spain)	Points
Pro
1	(United States) Ernie Francis Jr. (South Africa) Giano Taurino	2	1	3	6	2	**1**	1	4			93
2	(Costa Rica) Danny Formal (United States) Ryan Norman	**3**	4	2	8	**1**	2	**4**	**1**			87
3	(Brazil) Kiko Porto (France) Nico Jamin	1	**3**	1	**1**	6	3	7	5			82
4	(United States) Bryson Morris (France) Loris Cabirou	5†	2	4	4	5	5	3	2			68
5	(United States) Jake Walker	4	5	6	2	4	7	5	7			53
6	(United States) Scott Huffaker			5	3	7	6	6	6			35
7	(United States) Elias De La Torre			8	5			2	3			31
8	(United States) Patrick Liddy			**7**	7	3	4					27
9	(United States) Keawn Tandon					4	7	5	7			22
Pro-Am
1	(United States) Nate Stacy (United States) Nick Persing	1	8	11	1	8	2	**1**	1			79
2	(United States) AJ Muss (United States) Joel Miller	10	5	4	2	2	1	2	**3**			77
3	(United States) Andy Lee (United States) Slade Stewart	**5**	3	**1**	3	4	4	11	5			65
4	(Netherlands) Jeroen Bleekemolen (United States) Tim Pappas	3	1	3	**4**	3	**10**	13	8			59
5	(United States) Nikko Reger (United States) Shehan Chandrasoma	7	4	7	8	1	3	4	6			57
6	(United States) Blake McDonald (United States) Patrick Liddy	2	2					3	2			46
7	(United States) Garrett Adams (United States) Luke Berkeley	9	9	5	9	5	6	5	10			30
8	(United States) Tyler Hoffman (United States) Wesley Slimp	6	7	6	5	9	8	7	13†			29
9	(United States) JCD Dubets	4	**6**	10	11	**7**	9	9	9			26
10	(United States) Marc Miller (United States) Paul Nemschoff			8	7	6	5	12	12			18
11	(United States) David Staab	4	**6**									14
12	(United States) Cam Aliabadi (United States) Jaden Conwright			2	10							13
13	(United States) Brady Golan (Australia) Cameron Shields							6	4			13
14	(United States) Jay Logan (France) Alexandre Prémat					10	7	8	7			12
15	(United States) Tom Capizzi			10	11	**7**	9	9	9			12
16	(United States) Keawn Tandon (United States) Lane Vacala			9	6							7
17	(United States) Courtney Crone (United States) Scott Huffaker	8	10									4
18	(United States) Mark Wilgus (United States) Connor Bloum							10	11			1
Am
1	(United States) Anthony McIntosh (United States) Glenn McGee	**2**	3	**9**	1	**3**	8	1	**1**			86
2	(United States) Dominic Starkweather	4	4	3	2	1	2	2	5			83
3	(United States) Al Morey	8	8	1	11†	10	4	**3**	2			53
4	(United States) Anthony Bullock	11	10	4	4	4	1	9	6			48
5	(United States) Cole Kleck			1	11†	10	4	**3**	2			47
6	(United States) Ken Dobson	1	1	DNS	DNS			6	3			45
7	(United States) Rob Walker	3	2	11	8	6	7	7	8			41
8	(United States) Graham Doyle	12	9	7	6	2	5	4	7			41
9	(United States) Sam Shi	5	**5**	10	7	5	3	5	12			40
10	(United States) Ashton Harrison			7	6	2	5	4	7			39
11	(United States) Adrian Kunzle	7	7	8	3	7	6	12	4			38
12	(United States) Kevin Madsen	6	12	5	**9**	7	6	12	4			31
13	(United States) Andre Lagartixa	9	11	2	5	8	9	11	9			27
14	(United States) Robert Soroka	9	11	2	5	8	9					25
15	(United States) Jason Rabe	7	7	8	3							21
16	(United States) Ron Atapattu	6	12	5	**9**							14
17	(United States) William Edwards	8	8					8	11			9
18	(United States) Mark Wilgus			10	6	9	DNS					8
19	(United States) Lane Vacala	10	6									6
20	(Colombia) David Esteban Cárdenas							10	10			2
–	(United States) Alan Fudge			DNS	DNS							0
LB Cup
1	(United States) Nick Groat	4	9	3	**2**	1	**1**	2	**3**			87
2	(United States) Rodrigo Vales	3	6	4	3	6	3	**1**	1			79
3	(United States) Michael Staab	9	7	**1**	1	3	9	3	DNS			59
4	(United States) Jon Hirshberg	2	4	2	4	7	4	11†	7			56
5	(United States) Mark Brummond	1	3			2	2	6	DNS			54
6	(United States) Rogelio Perusquia	3	6	4	3	6	3					48
7	(United States) Ofir Levy	10	**2**	6	9	4	8					32
8	(United States) Rocky T Bolduc					5	5	7	2			28
9	(United States) Naveen Rao	**6**	1									21
10	(United States) Stephen Sorbaro					8	7	5	5			19
11	(United States) Andrew Strobert			7	6	9	6	8	DNS			19
12	(United States) Christopher Tasca	5	10	10	DNS			9	4			18
13	(United States) Alexandre Lima	7	8	5	8	**10**	DNS					18
14	(United States) Raymond Davoudi	8	5	9	7	DNS	DNS					15
15	(United States) Clayton Wilson							4	6			13
16	(Colombia) David Esteban Cárdenas			5	8	**10**	DNS					11
17	(United States) Ray Shahi			8	5			10	DNS			10

Colour	Result
Gold	Winner
Silver	Second place
Bronze	Third place
Green	Points classification
Blue	Non-points classification
Blue	Non-classified finish (NC)
Purple	Retired, not classified (Ret)
Red	Did not qualify (DNQ)
Red	Did not pre-qualify (DNPQ)
Black	Disqualified (DSQ)
White	Did not start (DNS)
White	Withdrew (WD)
White	Race cancelled (C)
Blank	Did not practice (DNP)
Blank	Did not arrive (DNA)
Blank	Excluded (EX)

**Bold** - Pole position

†: Post-event penalty. Car moved to back of class.
