= Anthony McIntosh =

American racing driver

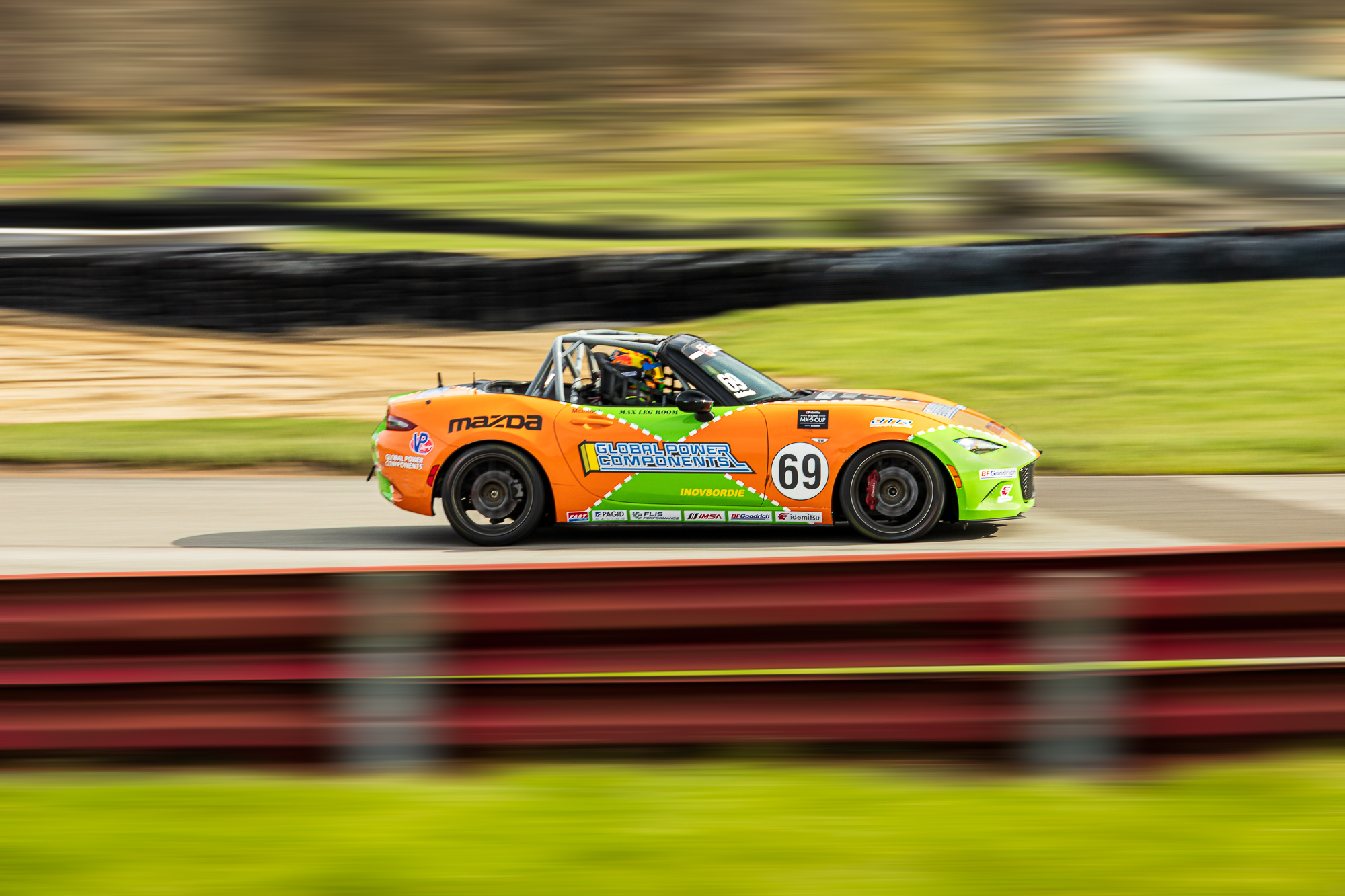
- McIntosh at Mid-Ohio in 2022
- Nationality: (United States) American
- Born: April 6, 1975 (age 51) Milwaukee, Wisconsin, United States

FIA World Endurance Championship career
- Debut season: 2025
- Current team: Team WRT
- Categorisation: FIA Bronze
- Car number: 69
- Former teams: Racing Spirit of Léman
- Starts: 7
- Wins: 1
- Podiums: 3
- Poles: 2
- Fastest laps: 0
- Best finish: 19th (LMGT3) in 2025

Championship titles
- 2025–26 2024 2024 2023: 24H Series Middle East – GT3; Lamborghini Super Trofeo North America – Am; Italian GT Championship – Sprint – GT3 Am; Lamborghini Super Trofeo North America – Am
- Statistics up to date as of August 22, 2026.

Anthony McIntosh (born April 6, 1975) is an American racing driver and businessman.

McIntosh was the 2023 and 2024 champion of the Lamborghini Super Trofeo North America's Am class alongside Glenn McGee. McIntosh and McGee were also GT3 Am champions in the Sprint division of the 2024 Italian GT Championship. McIntosh additionally is CEO of Wisconsin-based corporation Global Power Components.

== Career ==
=== Early career ===
Following a serious illness which nearly took his life, McIntosh purchased a track day car, stating that he daydreamed about becoming a racing driver as he recovered from his illness. Due to delays in receiving his track day car, he enrolled in the Lucas Oil School of Racing, where he met future co-driver Glenn McGee. Coincidentally, McIntosh had also worked with Jared Thomas' former college roommate, paving the way for McIntosh to join Thomas' JTR Motorsports Engineering team for a select few races in the Mazda MX-5 Cup.

Following a pair of races with the team in 2021, McIntosh took on a full-time drive in the series in 2022. He tallied a best finish of 14th, in the final round of the season at Road Atlanta, finishing 25th in the championship after skipping the round at VIR. McIntosh's VIR weekend was instead spent debuting in Lamborghini Super Trofeo North America, where he scored a maiden class win in LB Cup on Sunday.

=== Global racing expansion (2023–present) ===
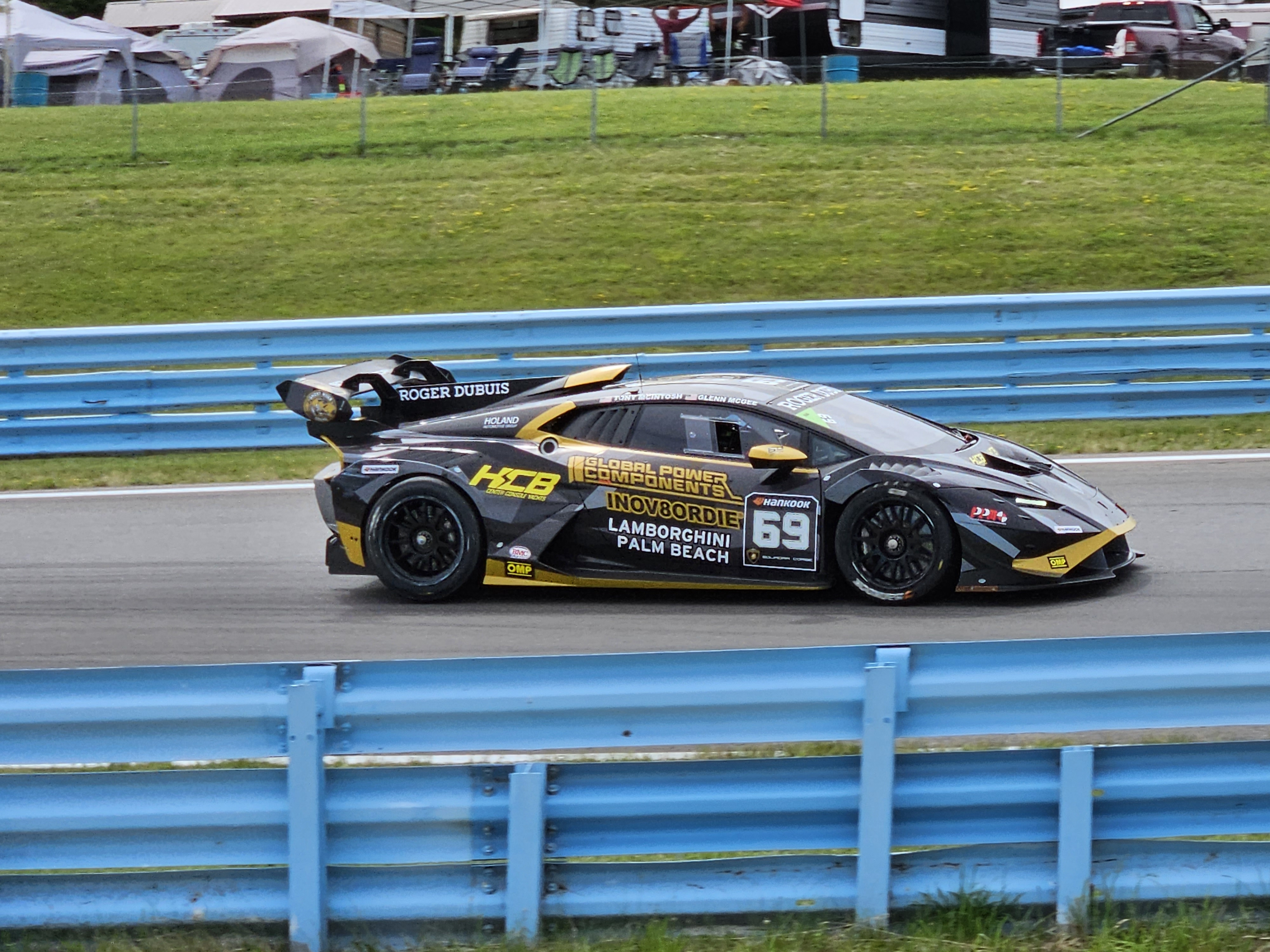
McIntosh's Lamborghini Super Trofeo entry at Watkins Glen in 2023

2023 saw McIntosh expand into Super Trofeo competition full-time, where he and McGee took on an effort in the series' Am class. After claiming four podium finishes in the opening four races, the duo claimed a breakthrough class victory at Road America. The win was the first in a string of five consecutive race victories for McIntosh, as the team swept the final two rounds of the American calendar at VIR and Indianapolis, claiming the title with a race to spare during the season finale at Vallelunga. Later that weekend, McGee and McIntosh were crowned World Finals champions in the Am class, becoming the only American drivers to win a World Final in 2023. The duo had elected to take on the two Lamborghini Super Trofeo Europe races that weekend as well, giving them additional track time and setup knowledge which they stated were instrumental in helping them taking the title. McIntosh also took on a second full-time Mazda MX-5 Cup campaign in 2023, tallying a career-best finish of sixth at St. Petersburg, as well as select outings in the Michelin Pilot Challenge and Porsche Sprint Challenge North America.

McIntosh returned to defend his title in 2024, shifting from Precision Performance Motorsports to an entry fielded by Wayne Taylor Racing. Following a pair of podium finishes in the season opener at Sebring, the duo claimed their first victory of the season at Laguna Seca following the class-winning #28 entry failing post-race technical inspection. The duo proceeded to claim weekend sweeps at COTA and Indianapolis, before a sixth class victory of the season in the final race at Jerez confirmed a second consecutive Am class championship for McIntosh. After taking part in the final few rounds of the Super Trofeo Europe season with Brendon Leitch, McIntosh launched a two-pronged effort on the World Finals, racing alongside McGee in the Am championship and Leitch in the Pro/Am final. The Pro/Am final saw McIntosh and Leitch sweep the class, claiming the world title in the process. In the Am final, McIntosh came up a point short to winner Renaud Kuppens, missing out on a second world title of the year.

2024 also saw McIntosh debut in GT3 machinery, taking on the Italian GT Championship alongside McGee in a Mercedes-AMG GT3 Evo. In the series' Sprint championship, the duo were crowned Am-class champions. McIntosh also took part in select few Mazda MX-5 Cup races with JTR, the 2024 Road to Le Mans, and the inaugural 992 Endurance Cup. During the off-season, McIntosh also took part in the Asian Le Mans Series, returning to the Mercedes-AMG GT3 platform with which he won his Italian GT title earlier that year. Driving alongside Parker Thompson and Ben Barnicoat, McIntosh claimed his sole class victory of the season in the first race at Dubai, en route to a sixth-place championship finish.

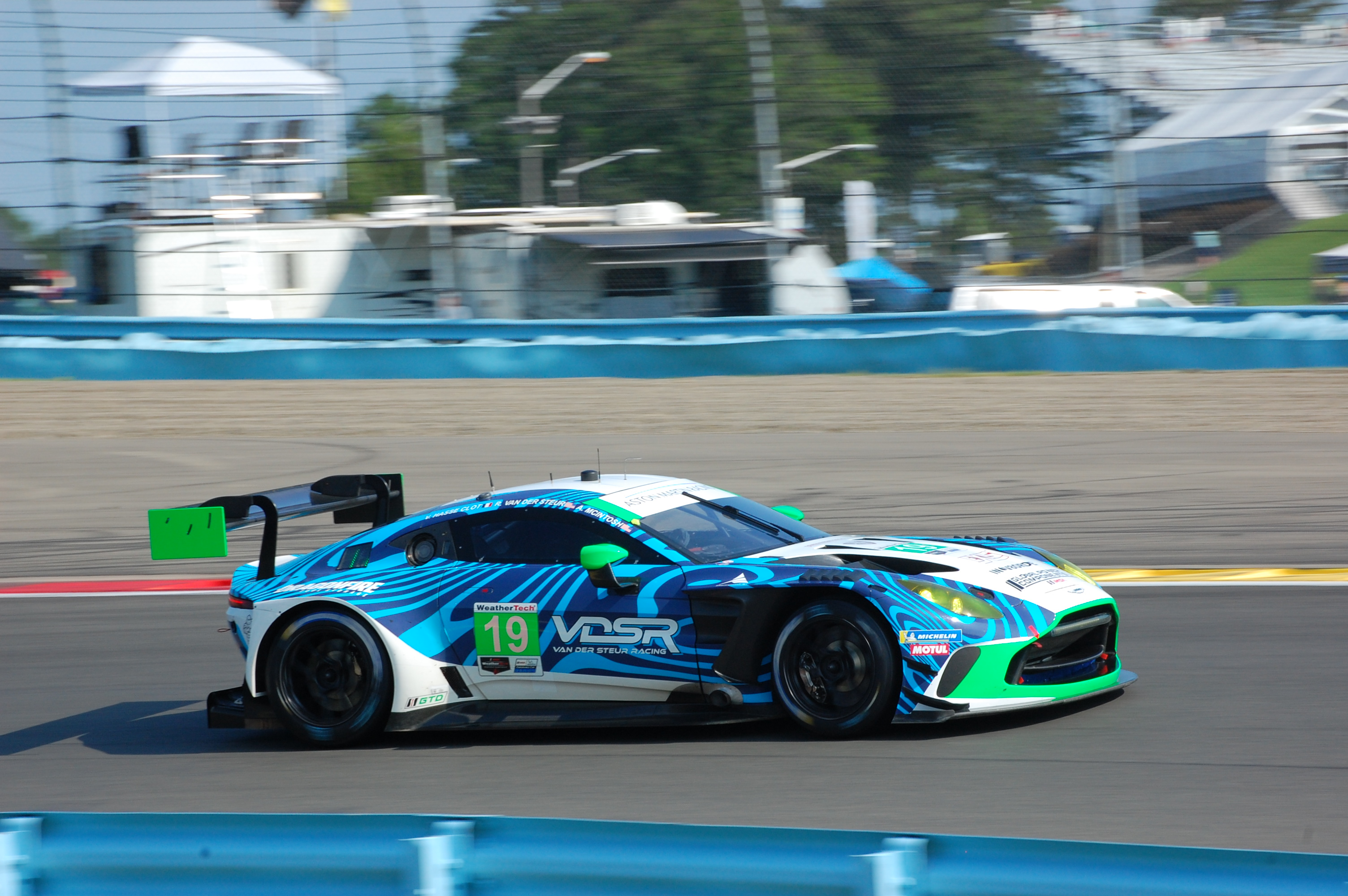
McIntosh at Watkins Glen in 2025

McIntosh kicked off his 2025 campaign by debuting at the 24 Hours of Daytona, where he competed with van der Steur Racing in the GTD class. Driving alongside Rory van der Steur, Valentin Hasse-Clot, and Maxime Robin, McIntosh came home sixth in class in his IMSA SportsCar Championship debut. He later expanded his program with the team to include the entire Michelin Endurance Cup. Over the course of 2025, McIntosh also returned to Lamborghini Super Trofeo North America, stepping up to the Pro-Am class alongside his previous Super Trofeo Europe co-driver, Brendon Leitch. McIntosh also worked closely with Thompson, who was the former's driver coach, in GT4 America and GT America competition over the course of the year. In June, McIntosh made his debut at the 24 Hours of Spa, driving in the Pro-Am class for Beechdean Motorsport alongside Hasse-Clot, Andrew Howard, and Ross Gunn. McIntosh finished second in class and 32nd overall. Later that year, McIntosh made his FIA World Endurance Championship debut, replacing Derek DeBoer in Racing Spirit of Léman's entry at Interlagos.

== Personal life ==
McIntosh is the CEO of manufacturing company Global Power Components.

== Racing record ==
=== Career summary ===
Season	Series	Team	Races	Wins	Poles	F/Laps	Podiums	Points	Position
2021	Mazda MX-5 Cup	JTR Motorsports Engineering	2	0	0	0	0	310	34th
2022	Mazda MX-5 Cup	JTR Motorsports Engineering	12	0	0	0	0	985	25th
2022	Lamborghini Super Trofeo North America - LB Cup	Precision Performance Motorsports	2	1	1	?	2	28	8th
2023	Lamborghini Super Trofeo North America - Am	Precision Performance Motorsports	12	5	5	2	10	144	**1st**
2023	Lamborghini Super Trofeo World Final - Am	Precision Performance Motorsports	2	1	?	?	2	26	**1st**
2023	Mazda MX-5 Cup	JTR Motorsports Engineering	14	0	0	0	0	1960	15th
2023	Michelin Pilot Challenge - GS	JTR Motorsports Engineering	2	0	0	0	0	450	33rd
2023	Porsche Sprint Challenge North America - 992 Pro/Am	Forward Motorsports	4	0	0	0	3	182	7th
2023	Lamborghini Super Trofeo Europe - Am	Imperiale Racing	2	0	0	0	1	16	17th
2024	Lamborghini Super Trofeo North America - Am	Wayne Taylor Racing with Andretti	12	6	6	?	10	139	**1st**
2024	Lamborghini Super Trofeo World Final - Am	Wayne Taylor Racing with Andretti	2	1	?	?	2	27	**2nd**
2024	Lamborghini Super Trofeo Europe - Pro-Am	Leipert Motorsport	4	2	?	?	3	49	11th
2024	Lamborghini Super Trofeo Europe - Am	Leipert Motorsport	4	0	1	0	2	29	12th
2024	Lamborghini Super Trofeo World Final - Pro-Am	Leipert Motorsport	2	2	?	?	2	30	**1st**
2024	Italian GT Championship - Sprint - GT3 Am	AKM Motorsport	8	5	3	2	6	122	**1st**
2024	Porsche Endurance Challenge North America - GT3 Cup	JTR Motorsports Engineering	4	1	?	?	3	254	**1st**
2024	Mazda MX-5 Cup	JTR Motorsports Engineering	2	0	0	0	0	320	38th
2024	Le Mans Cup - LMP3	Nielsen Racing	2	0	0	0	0	0	NC
2024	992 Endurance Cup	Mühlner Motorsport	1	0	0	0	0	N/A	21st
2024–25	Asian Le Mans Series - GT	2 Seas Motorsport	6	1	0	?	1	43	6th
2025	GT America Series - GT4	JTR Motorsports Engineering	6	4	3	2	6	136*	1st*
2025	GT4 America Series - Pro/Am	JTR Motorsports Engineering	6	0	1	0	2	62*	5th*
2025	Lamborghini Super Trofeo North America – Pro-Am	Wayne Taylor Racing	6	2	1	?	2	35*	7th*
2025	IMSA SportsCar Championship - GTD	van der Steur Racing	5	0	0	1	0	991	30th
2025	GT World Challenge Europe Endurance Cup	Beechdean Motorsport	1	0	0	0	0	0	NC
2025	Le Mans Cup - LMGT3	Racing Spirit of Léman	2	0	0	0	1	0	NC
2025	FIA World Endurance Championship - LMGT3	Racing Spirit of Léman	3	0	2	0	1	17	19th
2025	Italian GT Championship Endurance Cup - GT3	BMW Italia Ceccato Racing	1	0	0	1	1	23	NC†
2025–26	Asian Le Mans Series - GT	Team WRT	6	2	0	0	3	70	**2nd**
2025–26	24H Series Middle East - GT3	Paradine Competition	1	0	0	0	0	0	NC
2026	FIA World Endurance Championship - LMGT3	Team WRT	8	1	0	0	3	78	5th
2026	Intercontinental GT Challenge	Team WRT	1	0	0	0	0	6	27th
2026	Italian GT Championship Sprint Cup - GT3	BMW Italia Ceccato Racing	8	0	0	0	1	30	11th
2026	European Le Mans Series - LMGT3	Racing Spirit of Léman	1	0	1	0	0	1	34th
2026	Nürburgring Langstrecken-Serie - Cup3	Schmickler Performance powered by Ravenol							
2026–27	Asian Le Mans Series – GT3	Team WRT						*	*

=== Complete Asian Le Mans Series results ===
(key) (Races in bold indicate pole position) (Races in italics indicate fastest lap)

Year	Team	Class	Car	Engine	1	2	3	4	5	6	Pos.	Points
2024–25	2 Seas Motorsport	GT	Mercedes-AMG GT3 Evo	Mercedes-AMG M159 6.2 L V8	SEP; 1; 8	SEP; 2; 8	DUB; 1; 1	DUB; 2; 6	ABU; 1 Ret	ABU; 2 Ret	6th	43
2025–26	Team WRT	GT	BMW M4 GT3 Evo	BMW P58 3.0 L Turbo I6	SEP; 1; 12	SEP; 2; 2	DUB; 1 Ret	DUB; 2; 1	ABU; 1; 1	ABU; 2; 10	2nd	70

=== Complete IMSA SportsCar Championship results ===
(key) (Races in bold indicate pole position) (Races in italics indicate fastest lap)

Year	Team	Class	Make	Engine	1	2	3	4	5	6	7	8	9	10	Rank	Points
2025	van der Steur Racing	GTD	Aston Martin Vantage AMR GT3 Evo	Aston Martin M177 4.0 L Turbo V8	DAY; 6	SEB; 15	LBH	LGA	WGL; 18	MOS	ELK	VIR	IMS; 15	PET; 11	30th	991

=== Complete FIA World Endurance Championship results ===
(key) (Races in bold indicate pole position) (Races in italics indicate fastest lap)

Year	Entrant	Class	Car	Engine	1	2	3	4	5	6	7	8	Rank	Points
2025	Racing Spirit of Léman	LMGT3	Aston Martin Vantage AMR GT3 Evo	Aston Martin M177 4.0 L Turbo V8	QAT	IMO	SPA	LMS	**SÃO**; 3	COA	**FUJ**; 17	BHR; 14	19th	17
2026	Team WRT	LMGT3	BMW M4 GT3 Evo	BMW P58 3.0 L Turbo I6	IMO; 1	SPA; 11	LMS; Ret	SÃO; 2	COA; 11	FUJ; 6	CAT; 3	MNZ; 4	5th	78

=== Complete 24 Hours of Le Mans results ===
Year	Team	Co-Drivers	Car	Class	Laps	Pos.	Class Pos.
2026	(Belgium) Team WRT	(United Kingdom) Dan Harper (Canada) Parker Thompson	BMW M4 GT3 Evo	LMGT3	291	DNF	DNF

=== Complete European Le Mans Series results ===
(key) (Races in bold indicate pole position; results in italics indicate fastest lap)

Year	Entrant	Class	Chassis	Engine	1	2	3	4	5	6	Rank	Points
2026	Racing Spirit of Léman	LMGT3	Aston Martin Vantage AMR GT3 Evo	Aston Martin M177 4.0 L Turbo V8	CAT	LEC	IMO	**SPA**; 12	SIL	ALG	34th	1

Sporting positions
Preceded by Shehan Chandrasoma	Lamborghini Super Trofeo North America; Am Champion; 2023, 2024; With: Glenn McGee	Succeeded by Incumbent
Preceded by Massimo Ciglia; Giuseppe Fascicolo	Italian GT Championship; GT3 Sprint Am Champion; 2024; With: Glenn McGee	Succeeded by Incumbent
