= Blake McDonald =

American racing driver (born 1990)

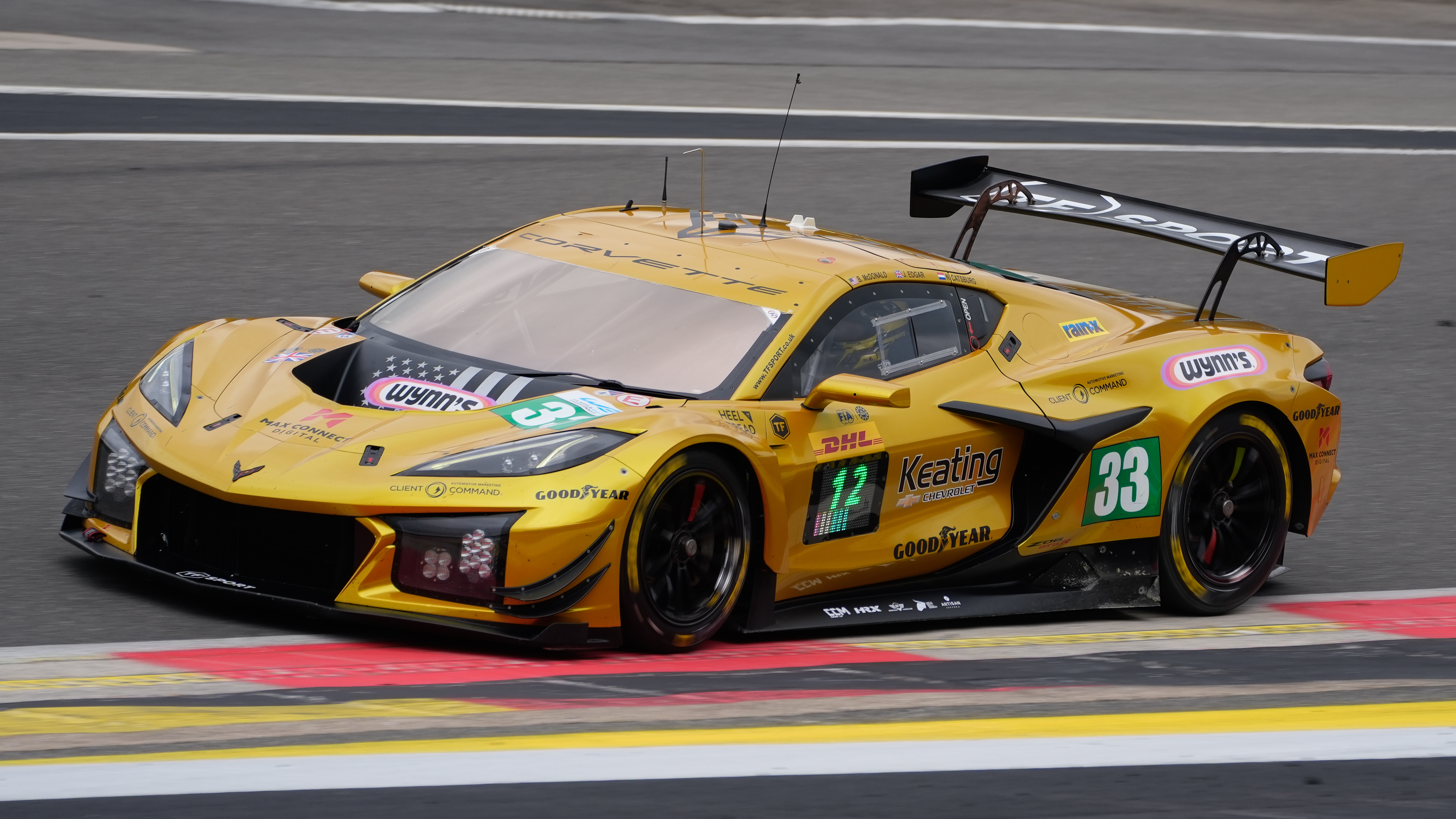
- McDonald in 2026
- Nationality: (United States) American
- Born: Blake Gillett McDonald; January 9, 1990 (age 36) Fresno, California, U.S.
- Categorisation: FIA Bronze

Championship titles
- 2026 2024: European Le Mans Series – LMGT3; Porsche Sprint Challenge USA West – 992 Pro-Am

Blake Gillett McDonald (born January 9, 1990) is an American racing driver who last competed for TF Sport in the LMGT3 class of the European Le Mans Series.

== Career ==
McDonald began his racing career in 2023, competing in Porsche Sprint Challenge North America for BR Racing. After two cameos in Porsche Carrera Cup North America for GMG Racing, McDonald completed the year with Forte Racing in Lamborghini Super Trofeo North America, most notably taking a Pro-Am win at the overseas round of Vallelunga and an LB Cup podium at the World Finals. In early 2024, McDonald made his LMP2 debut, joining Nielsen Racing for the UAE rounds of the Asian Le Mans Series—he scored a best result of eighth alongside Matt Bell and Patrick Liddy. For the rest of the year, McDonald returned to BR Racing to race in Porsche Sprint Challenge USA West, in which he clinched the 992 Pro-Am title. During 2024, McDonald also raced part-time in LSTNA for Forte, as well as the Indianapolis 8 Hours for Corvette-affiliated DXDT Racing.

At the beginning of 2025, McDonald competed in the Middle East Trophy for Ferrari-fielding Dragon Racing, before reuniting with DXDT Racing to race in GT World Challenge America alongside Matt Bell. Competing in Pro-Am, McDonald began the year with wins at Circuit of the Americas and Sebring, before further wins at Road America and Barber to secure runner-up honors in class. During 2025, McDonald also made select appearances in GT America for DXDT and entered the 24 Hours of Spa for Ferrari-aligned AF Corse. At the end of the year, McDonald joined fellow Corvette-aligned team TF Sport to compete in the GT class of the 2025–26 Asian Le Mans Series with Bell and James Roe.

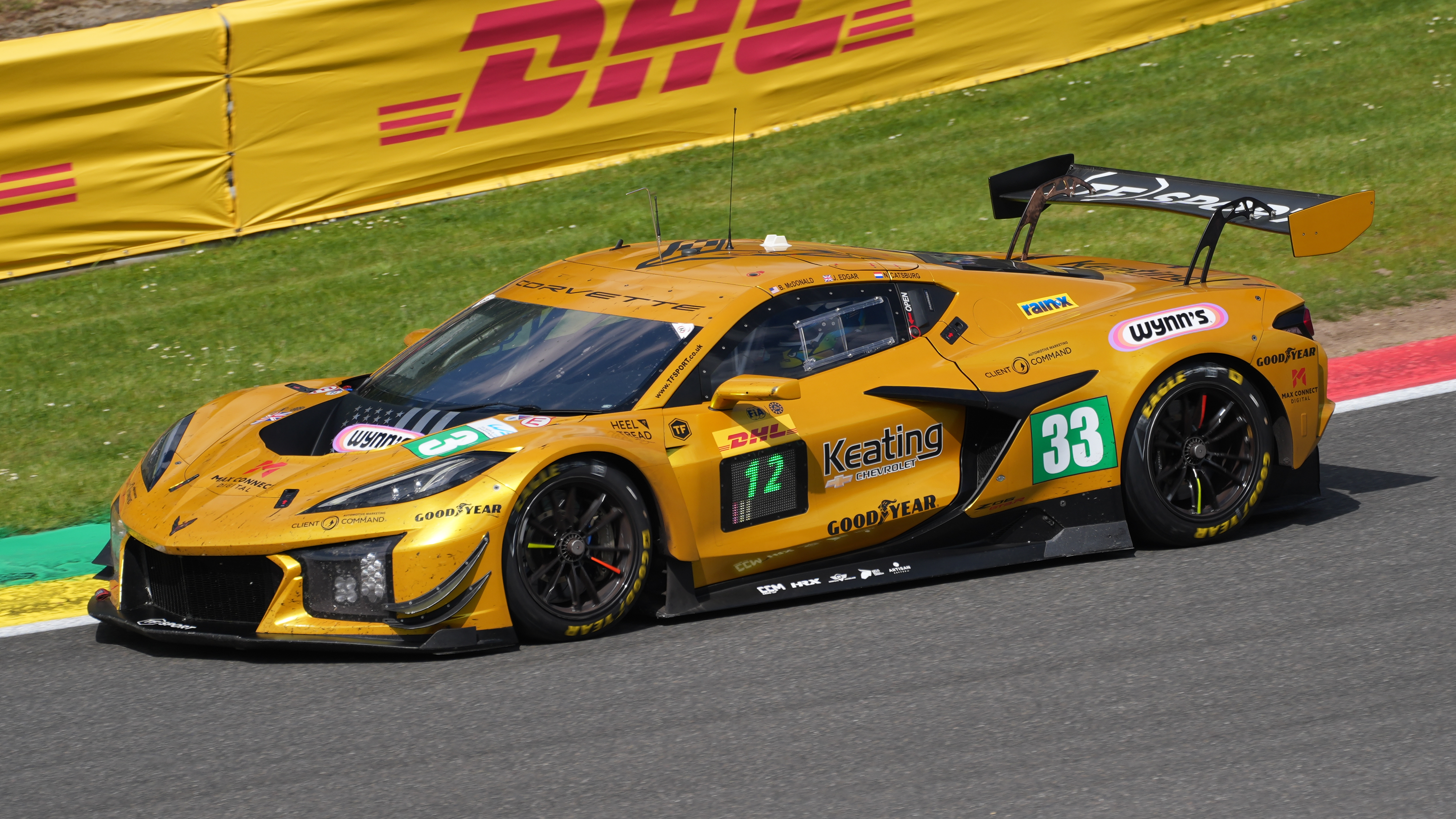
McDonald driving his TF Sport Corvette at the 2026 6 Hours of Spa.

Remaining with TF Sport for 2026, McDonald switched to the LMGT3 class of the European Le Mans Series, sharing a Chevrolet Corvette Z06 GT3.R with Charlie Eastwood and Alec Udell. In his maiden ELMS season, McDonald won at Imola and took three other podiums to clinch the LMGT3 title. During 2026, McDonald also stood in for an injured Ben Keating in the first two rounds of the FIA World Endurance Championship, taking a best result of second on debut at the 6 Hours of Imola.

== Racing record ==
=== Racing career summary ===
Season	Series	Team	Races	Wins	Poles	F/Laps	Podiums	Points	Position
2023	Porsche Sprint Challenge North America – 992 Pro-Am	BR Racing	6	0	0	0	0	84	13th
2023	Porsche Carrera Cup North America	GMG Racing	4	0	0	0	0	0	43rd
2023	Lamborghini Super Trofeo North America – LB Cup	Forte Racing powered by US RaceTronics	2	1	1	1	1	24	15th
2023	Lamborghini Super Trofeo North America – Pro-Am	Forte Racing powered by US RaceTronics	2	0	0	0	0	10	13th
2023	Lamborghini Super Trofeo World Finals – LB Cup	Forte Racing powered by US RaceTronics	2	0	1	0	1	12	5th
2023–24	Asian Le Mans Series – LMP2	Nielsen Racing	3	0	0	0	0	6	16th
2024	Porsche Sprint Challenge USA West – 992 Pro-Am	BR Racing						660	**1st**
2024	Lamborghini Super Trofeo North America – Pro-Am	Forte Racing	6	0	0	0	5	62	6th
2024	GT World Challenge America – Pro-Am	DXDT Racing	1	0	0	0	0	24	19th
2025	Middle East Trophy – GT3 Pro-Am	Dragon Racing	1	0	0	0	1	39	4th
2025	Middle East Trophy – GT3 Pro-Am	Into Africa Racing by Dragon Racing	1	0	0	0	0	39	4th
2025	GT World Challenge America – Pro-Am	DXDT Racing	13	4	0	0	10	195	**2nd**
2025	24H Series – GT3 Pro-Am	Kessel Racing	1	0	0	0	1	32	NC
2025	GT America Series – SRO3	DXDT Racing	2	0	3	1	0	12	13th
2025	Intercontinental GT Challenge	AF Corse	1	0	0	0	0	0	NC
2025–26	Asian Le Mans Series – GT	TF Sport	6	0	0	0	0	4	24th
2026	European Le Mans Series – LMGT3	TF Sport	6	1	1	1	4	88	**1st**
2026	FIA World Endurance Championship – LMGT3	TF Sport	2	0	0	0	1	22	18th

=== Complete Asian Le Mans Series results ===
(key) (Races in bold indicate pole position) (Races in italics indicate fastest lap)

Year	Team	Class	Car	Engine	1	2	3	4	5	6	Pos.	Points
2023–24	Nielsen Racing	LMP2	Oreca 07	Gibson GK428 4.2 L V8	SEP; 1	SEP; 2	DUB; 1 Ret	ABU; 1; 8	ABU; 2; 9		16th	6
2025–26	TF Sport	GT	Chevrolet Corvette Z06 GT3.R	Chevrolet LT6.R 5.5 L V8	SEP; 1; 15	SEP; 2; 9	DUB; 1 Ret	DUB; 2; 13	ABU; 1; 10	ABU; 2; 13	24th	4

=== Complete European Le Mans Series results ===
(key) (Races in bold indicate pole position; results in italics indicate fastest lap)

Year	Entrant	Class	Chassis	Engine	1	2	3	4	5	6	Rank	Points
2026	TF Sport	LMGT3	Chevrolet Corvette Z06 GT3.R	Chevrolet LT6.R 5.5 L V8	CAT; Ret	LEC; 2	**IMO**; 1	SPA; 6	SIL; 2	ALG; 2	1st	88

=== Complete FIA World Endurance Championship results ===
(key) (Races in bold indicate pole position; races in italics indicate fastest lap)

Year	Entrant	Class	Car	Engine	1	2	3	4	5	6	7	8	Rank	Points
2026	TF Sport	LMGT3	Chevrolet Corvette Z06 GT3.R	Chevrolet LT6.R 5.5 L V8	IMO; 2	SPA; 8	LMS	SÃO	COA	FUJ	CAT	MNZ	18th	22

^{*} Season still in progress.
