= Thierry Perrier =

French racing driver (born 1950)

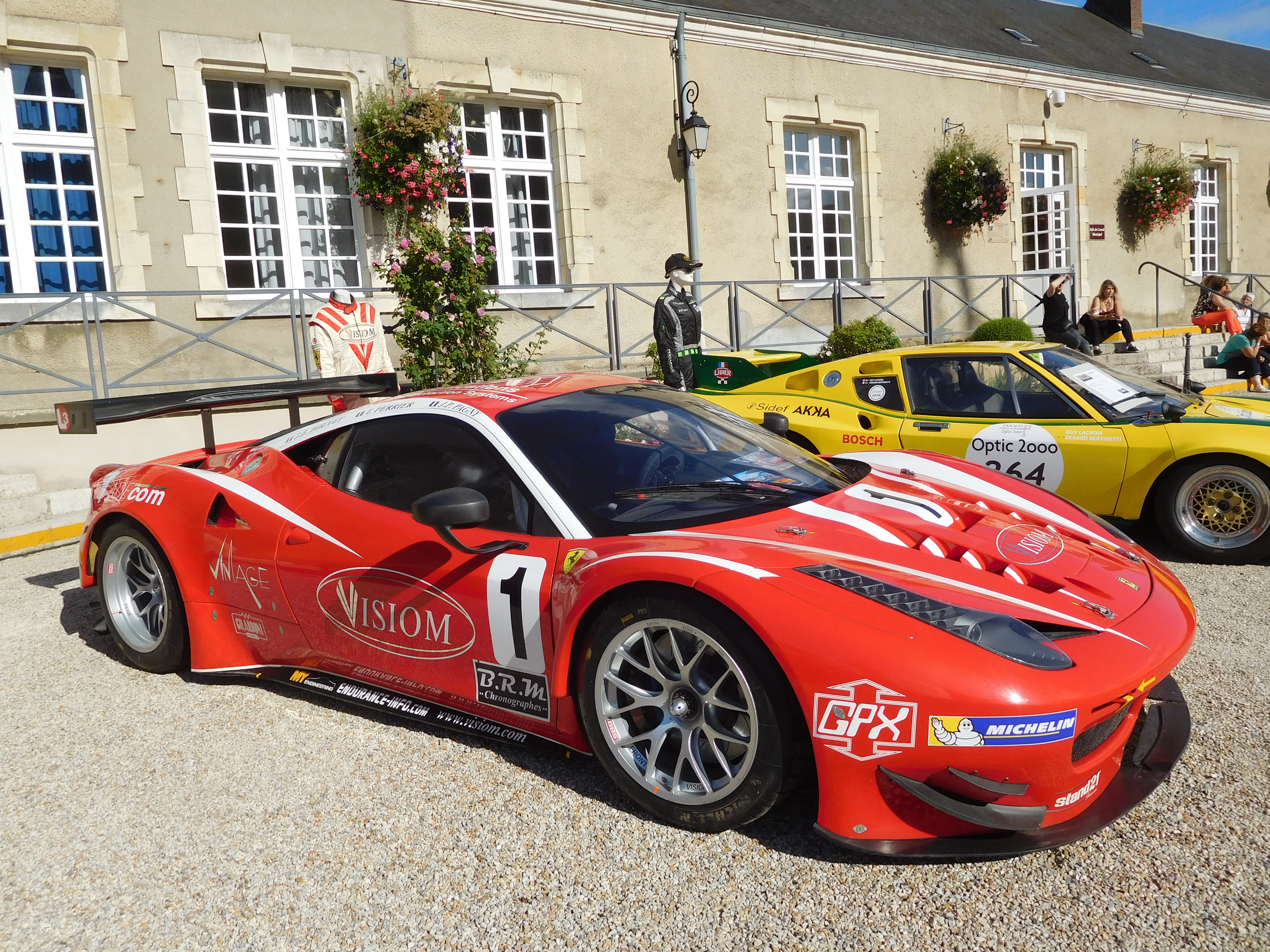
Ferrari 488 GT3 Visiom.

Thierry Perrier (born 16 April 1950, in Boulogne) is a French racing driver. He raced mainly in sportscars and GT.

== 24 Hours of Le Mans results ==
Year	Team	Co-Drivers	Car	Class	Laps	Pos.	Class Pos.
1975	(France) Thierry Perrier	(France) Jean Belliard	Porsche 911S	GT	-	DNQ	DNQ
1976	(France) Thierry Perrier	(France) Guy de Saint-Pierre (France) Martine Rénier	Porsche 911 Carrera RSR	Gr.5	273	18th	7th
1977	(France) Thierry Perrier	(France) Jean Belliard	Porsche 911 Carrera	Gr.5	90	DNF	DNF
1978	(France) Thierry Perrier	(France) Jean Belliard	Porsche 911 Carrera RS	IMSA +2.5	-	DNQ	DNQ
1980	(France) Thierry Perrier	(France) Roger Carmillet	Porsche 911SC	GT	280	16th	1st
1981	(France) Thierry Perrier	(France) Valentin Bertapelle (France) Bernard Salam	Porsche 934	GT	274	17th	1st
1982	(France) Thierry Perrier (Italy) Sivama Motor	(France) Bernard Salam (Italy) Gianni Giudici	Lancia Beta Monte Carlo	Gr.5	219	DNF	DNF
1983	(France) A.S. École Supérieure de Tourisme	(France) François Hesnault (France) Bernard Salam	Lancia LC1	C	232	NC	NC
1984	(France) Raymond Touroul	(France) Raymond Touroul (France) Valentin Bertapelle	Porsche 911SC	IMSA; GTO	283	17th	1st
1985	(France) Raymond Touroul Team	(France) Raymond Touroul (France) Philippe Dermagne	Porsche 911SC	B	107	DNF	DNF
1998	(France) Michel Nourry	(France) Michel Nourry (France) Jean-Louis Ricci	Porsche 911 GT2	GT2	276	18th	4th
1999	(France) Perspective Racing	(France) Jean-Louis Ricci (France) Michel Nourry	Porsche 993 Carrera RSR	GT	288	21st	3rd
2000	(France) Perspective Racing	(France) Jean-Louis Ricci (France) Romano Ricci	Porsche 996 GT3-R	GT	286	23rd	4th
2001	(France) Perspective Racing	(United Kingdom) Nigel Smith (Belgium) Michel Neugarten	Porsche 996 GT3-RS	GT	275	9th	3rd
