= Jean-Louis Ricci =

French racing driver (1944–2001)

Jean-Louis Ricci (22 February 1944 – 26 February 2001) was a French racing driver.

== Le Mans ==
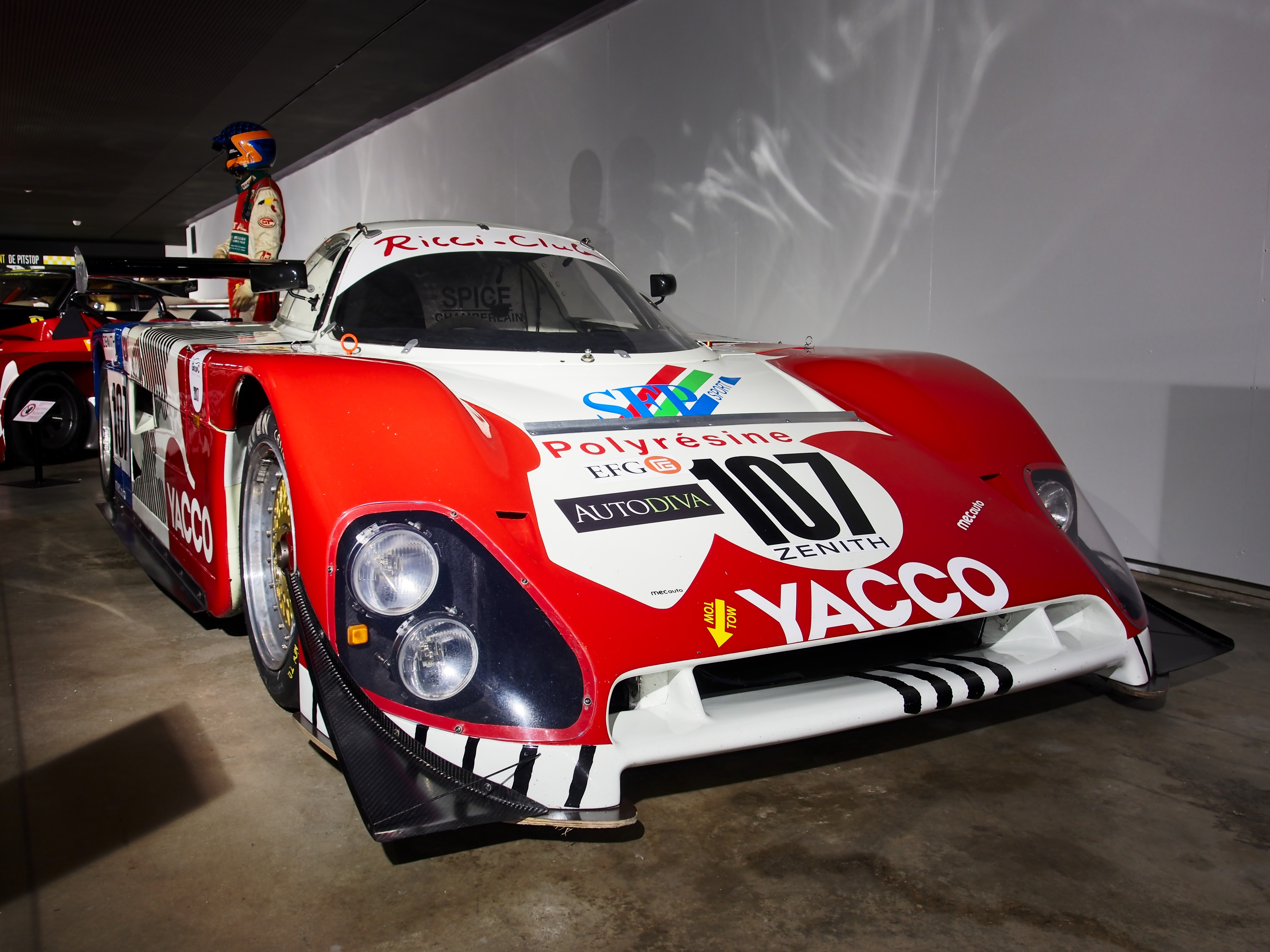
1988 - Spice SE88c - at the Spa-Francorchamps Racing Museum

Year	Team	Teammates	Car	Engine	Class	Laps	Pos	Class Pos
1987	(France) Olindo Iacobelli	(France) Olindo Iacobelli (France) Georges Tessier	Royale RP40	Ford Cosworth DFL 3.3L V8	C2	13	DNF	DNF
1988	(United Kingdom) Chamberlain Engineering	(France) Claude Ballot-Léna (France) Jean-Claude Andruet	Spice SE88C	Ford Cosworth DFL 3.3L V8	C2	17	DNF	DNF
1989	(Germany) Joest Racing	(France) Henri Pescarolo (France) Claude Ballot-Léna	Porsche 962C	Porsche Type-935 3.0L Turbo Flat-6	C1	371	6	6
1990	(Germany) Joest Porsche Racing	(France) Henri Pescarolo (France) Jacques Laffite	Porsche 962C	Porsche Type-935 3.0L Turbo Flat-6	C1	328	14	14
1991	(Netherlands) Euro Racing (United Kingdom) PC Automotive	(United Kingdom) Richard Piper (France) Olindo Iacobelli	Spice SE89C	Ford Cosworth DFZ 3.5L V8	C1	280	NC	NC
1992	(France) Courage Compétition	(France) Bob Wollek (France) Henri Pescarolo	Cougar C28LM	Porsche Type-935 3.0L Turbo Flat-6	C3	335	6	1
1993	(France) Courage Compétition	(France) Pierre Yver (France) Jean-François Yvon	Courage C30LM	Porsche Type-935 3.0 L Turbo Flat-6	C2	347	10	5
1994	(France) Courage Compétition	(United States) Andy Evans (Belgium) Philippe Olczyk	Courage C32LM	Porsche Type-935 3.0 L Turbo Flat-6	LMP1/C90	310	7	4
1997	(France) Courage Compétition	(Sweden) Fredrik Ekblom (Belgium) Jean-Paul Libert	Courage C36	Porsche Type-935 3.0 L Turbo Flat-6	LMP	265	16	5
1998	(France) Michel Nourry	(France) Michel Nourry (France) Thierry Perrier	Porsche 911 GT2	Porsche 3.6 L Turbo Flat-6	LMGT2	276	18	4
1999	(France) Perspective Racing	(France) Thierry Perrier (France) Michel Nourry	Porsche 911 Carrera RSR	Porsche 3.8 L Flat-6	LMGT	288	21	3
2000	(France) Perspective Racing	(France) Thierry Perrier (France) Romano Ricci	Porsche 911 GT3-R	Porsche 3.6 L Flat-6	LMGT	286	23	4
