= 1998 24 Hours of Le Mans =

66th 24 Hours of Le Mans endurance race

Previous: 1997	Next: 1999
Index: Races | Winners

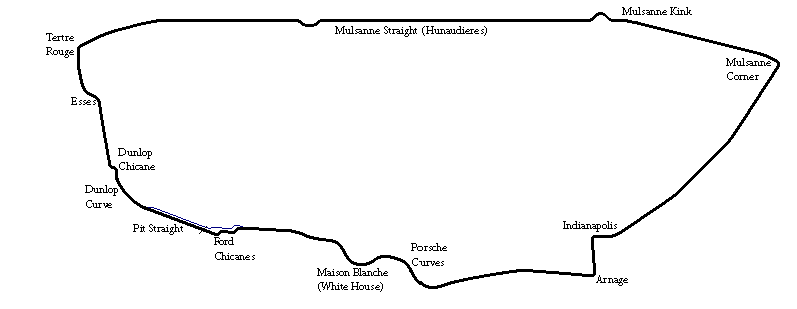
Le Mans in 1998

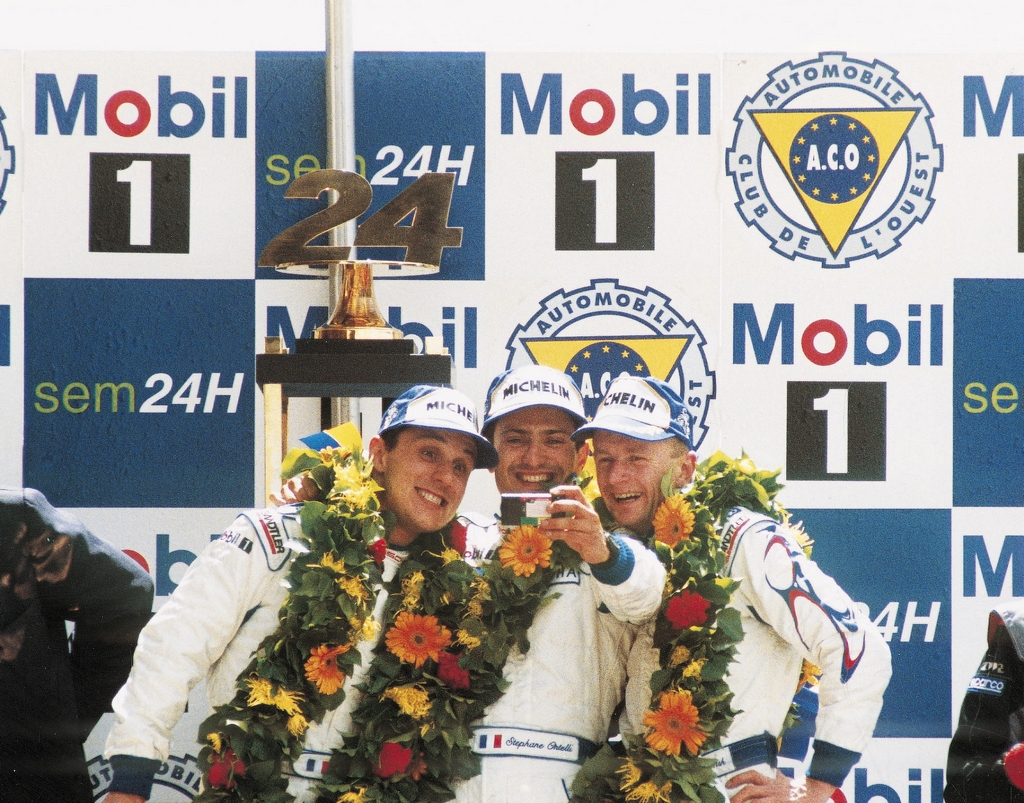
Overall winners, Aiello, Ortelli and McNish on the podium

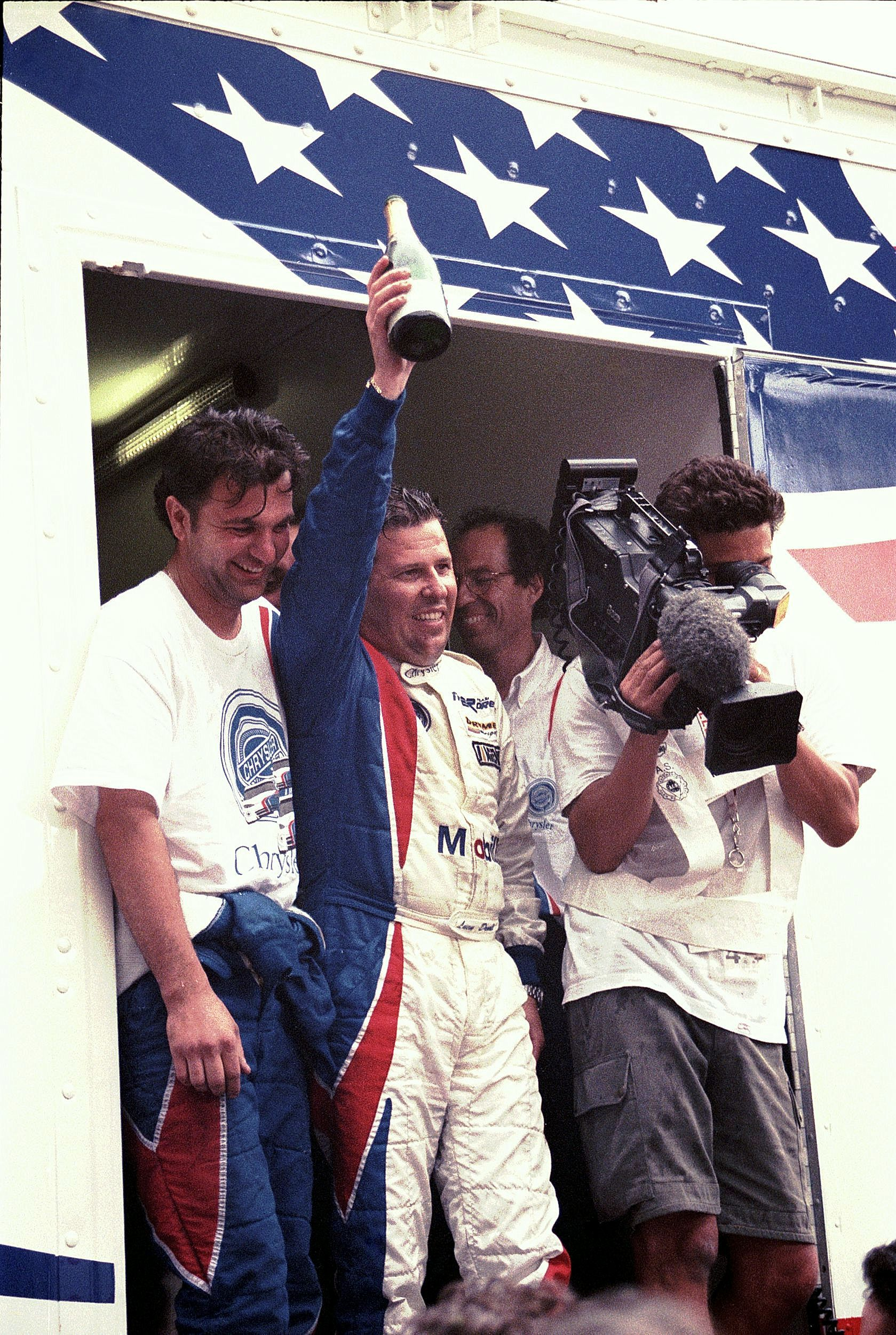
GT2 class winning Luca Drudi & David Donohue celebrate after the race

The 1998 24 Hours of Le Mans was the 66th Grand Prix of Endurance and took place on 6 and 7 June 1998. It was won by the Porsche of Allan McNish, Stéphane Ortelli and Laurent Aïello, giving Porsche its record-extending 16th overall victory. The race had promised much with Porsche facing major works efforts from the Mercedes-Benz, Toyota, Nissan and Panoz GT teams as well as BMW and Ferrari prototypes. From the flagfall, at the earlier start-time of 2pm, it was the Toyota team setting the pace and by the evening, it was apparent it was going to be a Porsche versus Toyota duel, with the rest broken or left in their wake. The Toyota GT-One was racing on debut and gearbox problems afflicted all three of the cars before nightfall after leading comfortably. It was then that the two Porsche works cars took over, staying in front through the night, as the Toyotas pushed hard to make back the time lost. As dawn broke it was the Porsches' turn to have mechanical problems and the Toyota of Geoff Lees/Thierry Boutsen/Ralf Kelleners grabbed the lead back again. In 1997, Porsche had lost the victory in the final hours. This year it was Toyota and the Porsche 911 GT1 finally won at its third attempt. The latter part of the race was very tense, thrilling the crowd, with the Toyota and Porsche staying on the same lap for five hours, without letting up. It was finally broken at 12.35pm, with less than 90 minutes to go. Kelleners had a 1-minute lead over McNish, each with one pitstop remaining but it was then that the Toyota’s gearbox broke and he coasted to a stop. Thereafter, with three laps gap to the nearest Nissan, McNish and Alzen were able to ease back to take a 1-2 Porsche finish. For the works Nissan finishing third, it was the first time an all-Japanese crew had been on the Le Mans podium, and all four of the team cars finished. The prototypes never had the pace to match the GT1s and all had issues of some sort. The best placed was the Doyle-Risi Ferrari finishing 8th, 19 laps back. In the GT2 class, it was a 1-2 finish for the Viper Team ORECA Chryslers, running trouble-free and winning convincingly over the Porsche 911 teams.

== Regulations ==
Once again, the Automobile Club de l'Ouest (ACO) made no notable changes to their technical specifications. The Prototype class was renamed LM-P1. The maximum allowed engine volume was increased from 5.1 to 6.0-litres, or 4.0-litres if turbocharged. In the LM-P2 class, engines had to be non-turbo 6-cylinders of a maximum 3.5-litres. The ACO reverted to a standard grid lineup based solely on the practice time. The start-time for the race was also brought forward to 2pm to avoid a TV conflict with the French Open finals.

In the US, Don Panoz liaised with the ACO and received copyright permission on his new race at his Road Atlanta circuit. The Petit Le Mans would be a 1000-mile or 10-hour race (whichever came first) to be held in October as the penultimate round of the 1998 IMSA season. It would be an experiment for both regulators, with both ACO and IMSA classes racing side-by-side.

== Entries ==
The 1998 entry list had a very strong manufacturer involvement, with 5 works teams in the Prototypes and 6 in the GT classes. In global racing, the International Sports Racing Series had given small fields in 1997, but the shoots of rebirth were apparent, and the 1998 series was gaining momentum, expanding to 8 rounds with almost twenty entries. In contrast, the GT1 series was already turning into a manufacturer “arms-race” with more and more money being spent. Over 30 prototypes entered for pre-qualifying, led by Porsche, Ferrari and Courage. Riley & Scott returned after winning the IMSA series and new designs came from BMW and WR. The P2 category was on life-support with just a single entry from Debora. In GT there were almost 50 entries, split evenly between GT1 and GT2. Having dominated from the latter half of the 1997 season, Mercedes-Benz looked strong for the win, although untried over 24 hours. Their competition would come from Nissan, Toyota and, of course, Porsche. The ACO gave automatic entry to only 6 cars this year as follows, removing two of the GT2 entries:

- 1997 Le Mans 24hr Prototype class-winner (Joest Racing)
- 1997 Coupe d’Automne 4hr Prototype class-winner (Courage Compétition)
- 1997 Le Mans 24hr GT1 class-winner (Gulf Team Davidoff McLaren)
- 1997 FIA GT Championship GT1 class-winner (AMG-Mercedes)
- 1997 Coupe d’Automne 4hr GT1 class-winner (Gulf Team Davidoff McLaren)
- 1997 Le Mans 24hr GT2 class-winner (Elf Haberthur Racing)

Pundits and journalists thought the race was wide open, with at least 20 cars potentially able to take line honours, and no clear favourite. Would new, but fragile, power beat older, proven reliability? Also notable was that there were 27 former or current F1 drivers (be it racing, or as test-drivers) in the entry list.

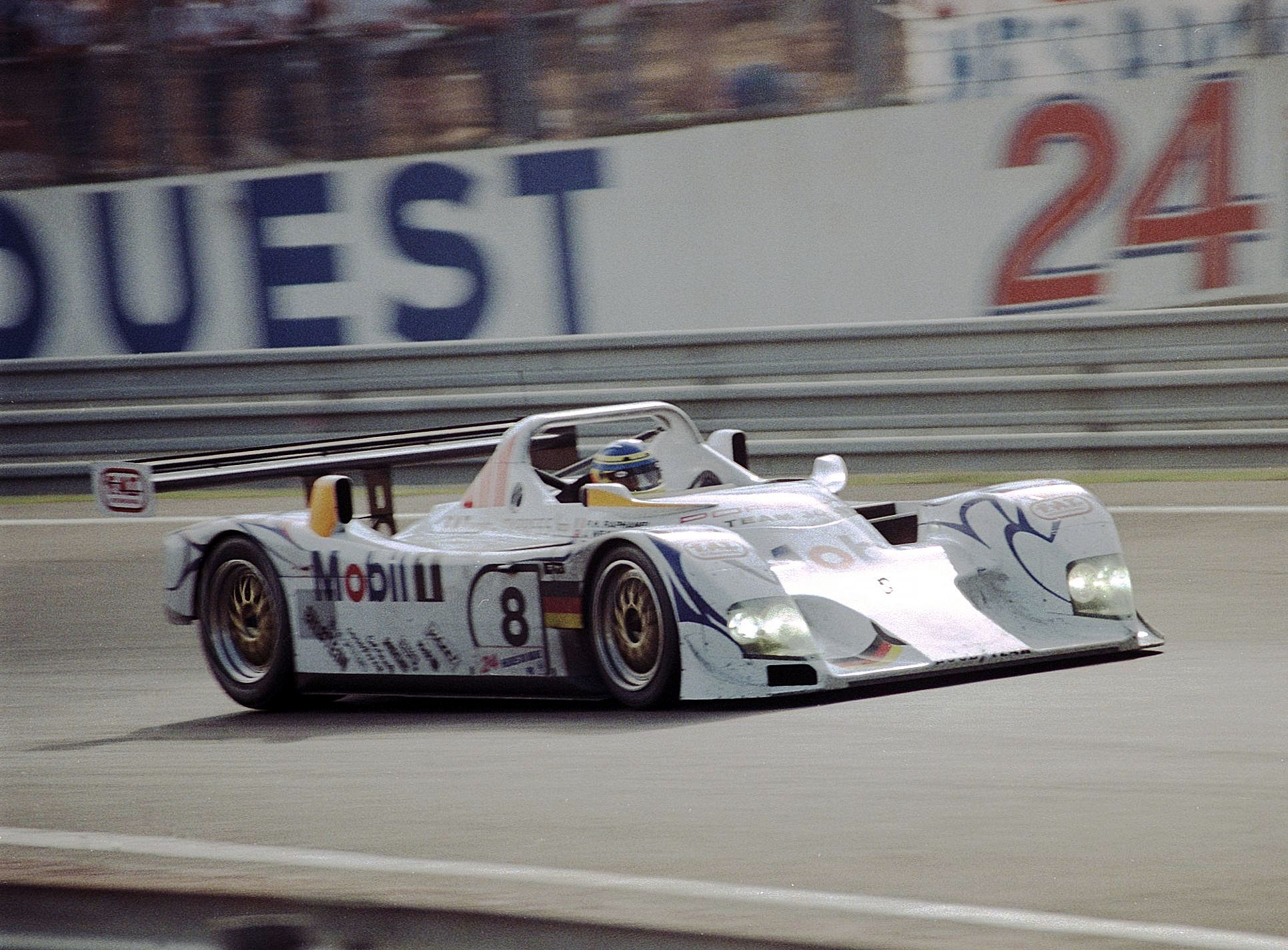
Porsche LMP1-98

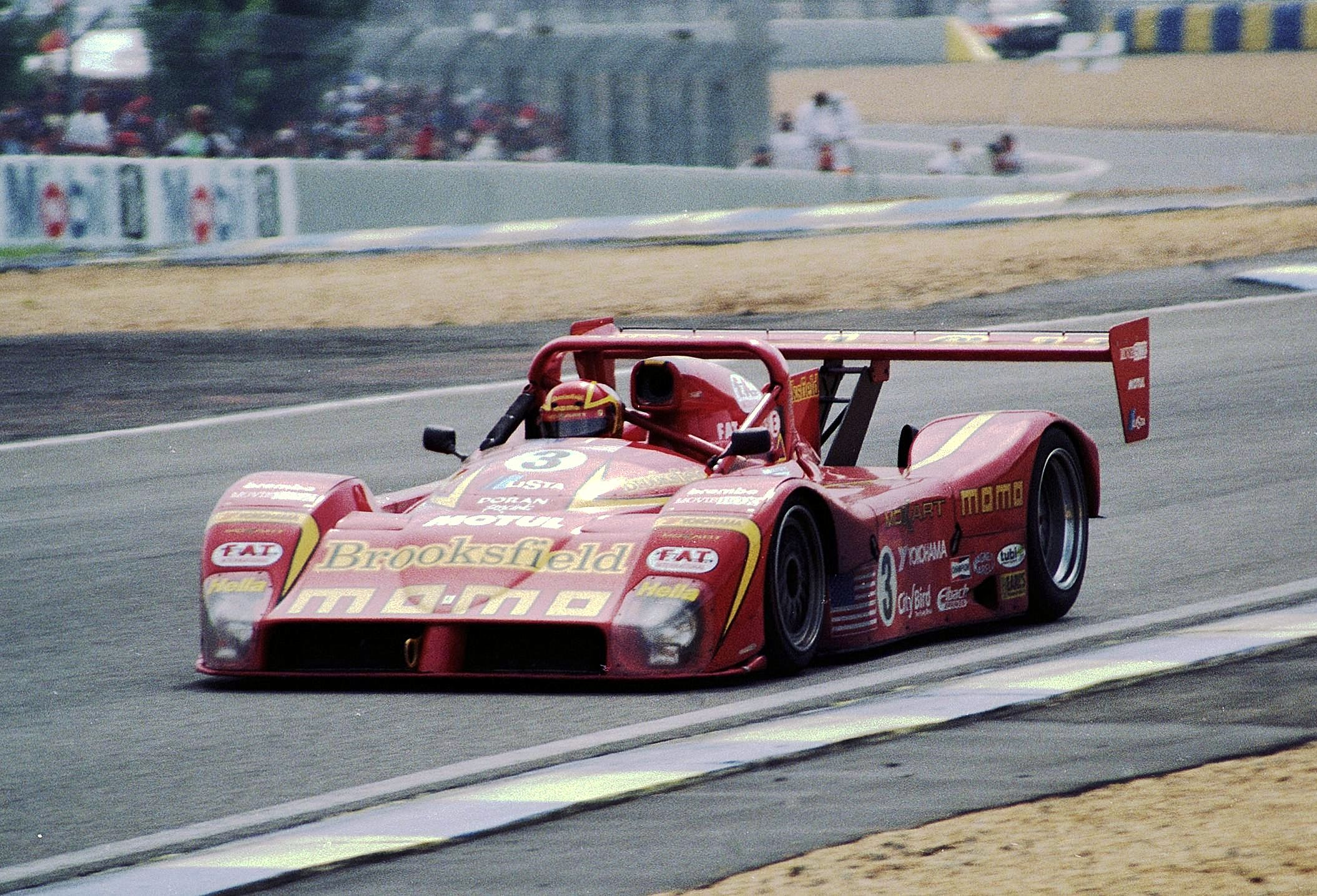
Ferrari 333 SP of Momo Racing

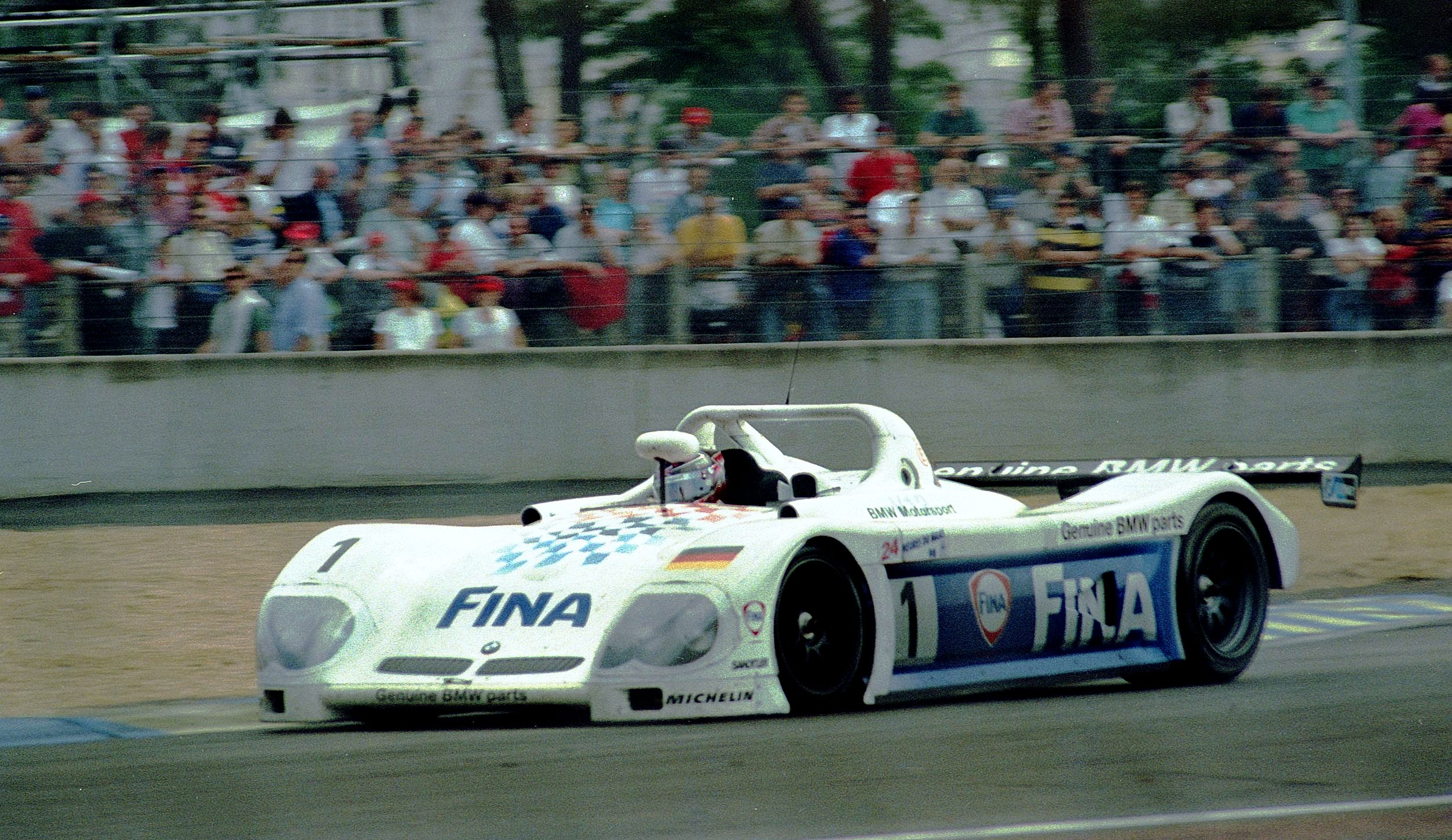
BMW V12 LM

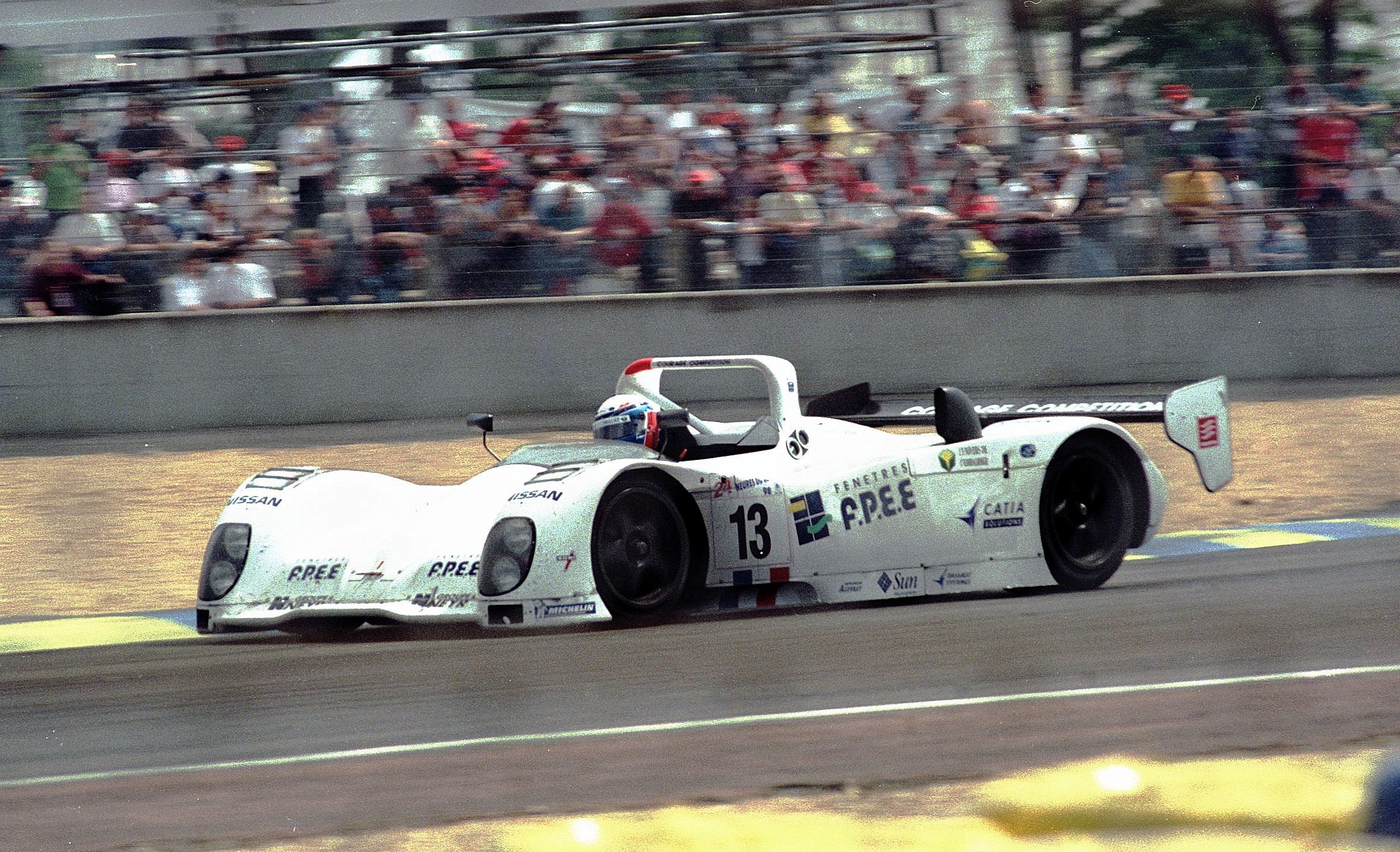
Courage C51

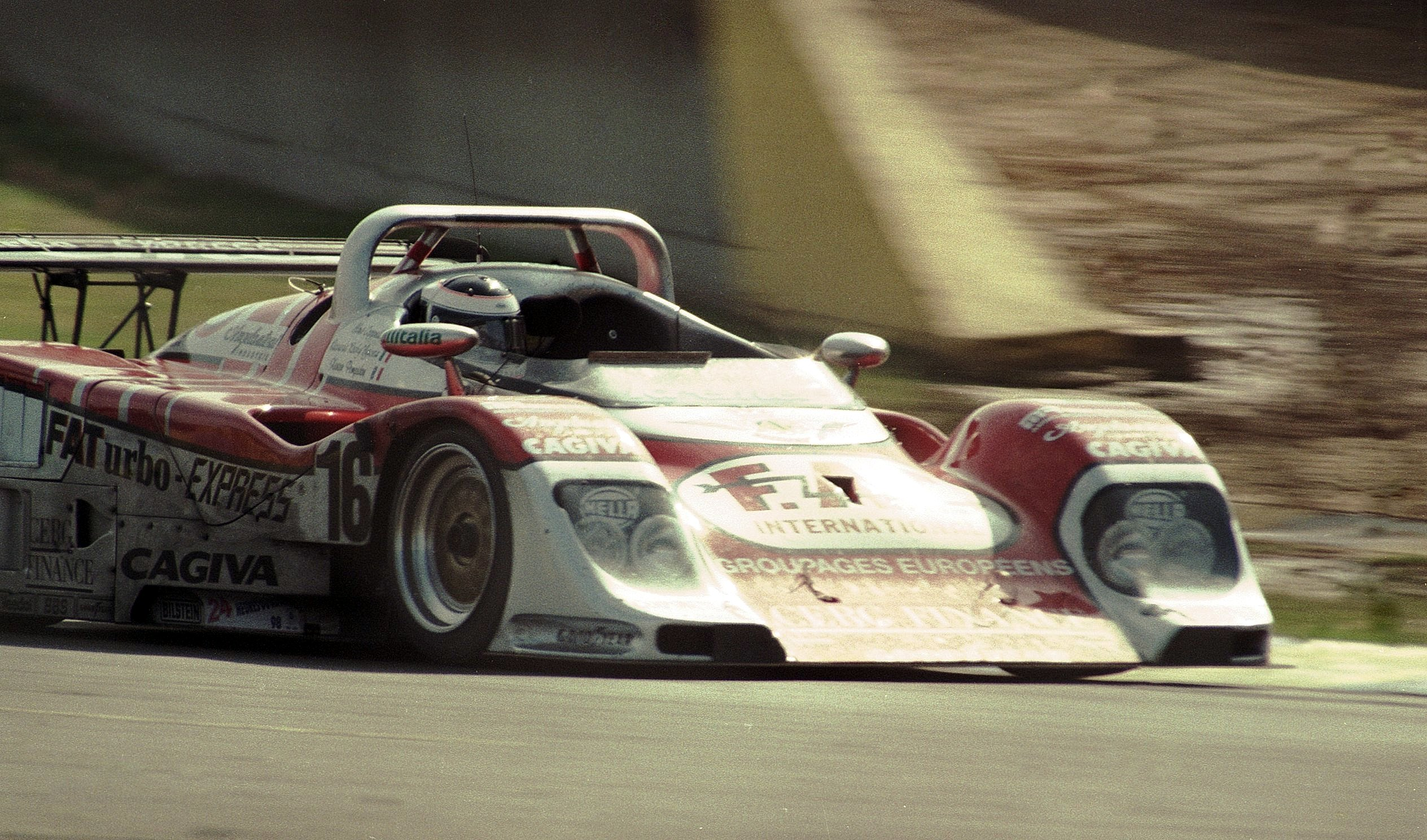
Kremer K8

Class	Quantity	Turbo engines
LM-P1	23 / 14	12 / 7
LM-P2	1 / 1	0 / 0
LM-GT1	24 / 15	14 / 9
LM-GT2	25 / 17	14 / 12
Total Entries	73 / 47	40 / 28

- Note: The first number were at pre-qualification, the second the number who started.

=== LM-P1 ===
Although Porsche's focus was with its GT1 cars, they invited Reinhold Joest to run their victorious TWR prototype a third time, now as a full works-assisted entry. Joined by the sister car that had been returned to the Porsche factory, they were re-engined with factory 3.2-litre powerplants and given new bodywork from Norbert Singer's design team to improve downforce. Now renamed as the “Porsche LMP1-98”, they also received the GT1 powertrain, gearbox and TAG engine-management system. The engine was restricted to just 530 bhp compared to the 600 bhp of the GT1s, but the car was also almost 80 kg lighter. Michele Alboreto and Stefan Johansson were reunited with their winning car, shared this time with works driver, and triple Le Mans winner, Yannick Dalmas. The second car had a new combination of Pierre-Henri Raphanel, James Weaver and David Murry.

This year, the Ferrari 333 SP was racing in series on both sides of the Atlantic, and four of the cars came to Le Mans. In the USA, racing had fractured into two series with the rival USRRC Can-Am Championship set up against the IMSA GT Championship that was looking to align with the ACO. Many of the prototype teams just ran cars in both and Gianpiero Moretti's Momo Racing Ferrari won the two blue riband events of the respective series, at Daytona and Sebring, at the start of the year. He thus returned to Le Mans with his regular co-drivers Didier Theys and Mauro Baldi (a Le Mans-winner in 1994) looking for a rare endurance triple. Dan Doyle had switched his team from the Riley & Scott to the 333 SP in a new relationship with Houston Ferrari dealer Giuseppe Risi. Their drivers Wayne Taylor and Eric van de Poele had also won a round in the IMSA series and were joined by Fermín Vélez. Both teams were running the latest development of the Ferrari 333, which had aerodynamic revisions, carbon brakes and a new 6-speed gearbox. With the ACO restrictors, it was tuned to 600 bhp. The other team running an upgraded Ferrari was the French JB Racing team, who had won the Brno round of the European series, after replacing their Porsche GT1. With regular team driver Emmanuel Collard being picked up by Toyota for this race, his teammate Vincenzo Sospiri was joined by the French duo of Jean-Christophe Boullion and Jérôme Policand. The fourth car was the four-year old chassis of Stéphane Ratel's Pilot Racing, which did not take up the upgrade kit. Co-owner Michel Ferté had veteran François Migault (in his 25th Le Mans) and Pascal Fabre as co-drivers. Ferrari's rivalry with Riley & Scott carried over to Le Mans again, with honours currently fairly even in the American series. Frenchman Philippe Gache, moving up from the ORECA Team Viper, bought one of the latest R & S Mk IIIs to run it in the ISRS. He had the car set up by the Solution F company in Provence, who had previously prepared his rallying cars. With the engine tuned in the US to produce 550 bhp, the car arrived just in time for Pre-qualifying but only got three quick laps in. The team did then score a 4th place at its first ISRS race, at Brno. For Le Mans, Gache brought in two former motorcycle racers as his co-drivers: Belgian Didier de Radiguès (also a Spa 24 Hours winner in 1997) and the Australian world champion Wayne Gardner, who had both latterly switched to four-wheel racing.

Courage Compétition arrived with its new C51, the first model from a renewed collaboration with Nissan. Back in 1989, Courage had run a March-Nissan alongside its own cars. Built around the turbocharged 3.0-litre V8 VRH-30L engine it, in turn, gave Nissan expertise in prototype chassis design as it looked to move into the LM P1 class. With 32-valves and twin IHI turbos, it put 540 bhp through Hewland's new 6-speed LSG sequential gearbox. Based on the C41 carbon/honeycomb chassis, designer Paolo Catone did extensive work reworking the suspension and rear-end to improve aerodynamics. NISMO Europe's Chris Goodwin came onboard as a project manager. Courage arrived with four cars, in the process becoming the French manufacturer with the most Le Mans starts (17 times). Two of them were C51s, driven by Didier Cottaz/Marc Goossens/Jean-Philippe Belloc in the famous #13, and Fredrik Ekblom/Patrice Gay/Takeshi Tsuchiya. Two Porsche-powered Courages were also entered. The C36 of the La Filière Elf young-driver academy returned. This year the veteran ’’grognard’’ Henri Pescarolo was joined by Olivier Grouillard and French F3 championship leader Franck Montagny. The other car was a 1997 C41 updated by the factory by relocating the radiators to remedy the engine overheating issues. Redesignated the C50, the car was then sold to the Japanese Team AM-PM who had Mazda veteran Yojiro Terada, Franck Fréon and Olivier Thévenin as the drivers.

For their 29th consecutive Le Mans start, the Kremer brothers brought their 5-year-old K8 Spyders out for a last hurrah. Almo Coppelli squeaked in through the Pre-qualifying by the tiniest of margins (0.008 seconds) ahead of the privateer K8 of Franz Konrad. He was joined by Rocky Agusta (moving up from his GT cars) and Xavier Pompidou. An Evo version of the K8 was also entered but its untested aerodynamics gave dangerous handling at high speed, and it failed to qualify.

A BMW engine had powered the McLaren in their 1995 Le Mans victory. In 1997, BMW had run a works GT team for McLaren. Confronted with the new racing-cars arriving with token production runs stretching the regulations, the company pulled its support from GT1. Instead, this year they arrived with a pair of new LM-P1 cars, built in cooperation with Williams Grand Prix Engineering before going into a 6-season F1 programme with them. The V12LM project was only started in August 1997 using the 6.0-litre V12 engine from the McLaren F1 GTR. Its latest evolution was saddled with much tighter air restrictors for the LM P1 class than in GT1, but with new camshafts, fuel injectors and exhaust, it was 22 kg lighter and put out 550 bhp. The chassis was designed by John Russell, former race engineer to Damon Hill and Nigel Mansell at Williams. Team Rafanelli (previously known as Bigazzi Team SRL) were brought on-board to race the cars. They were running a Riley & Scott with a 4.0-litre BMW engine in the ISRS, until the new cars were ready. Long-time Porsche stalwart Hans-Joachim Stuck led the team, with Steve Soper and had 1997-winner Tom Kristensen in the first car, while the experienced Pierluigi Martini, Joachim Winkelhock and Johnny Cecotto ran the other.

=== LM-P2 ===
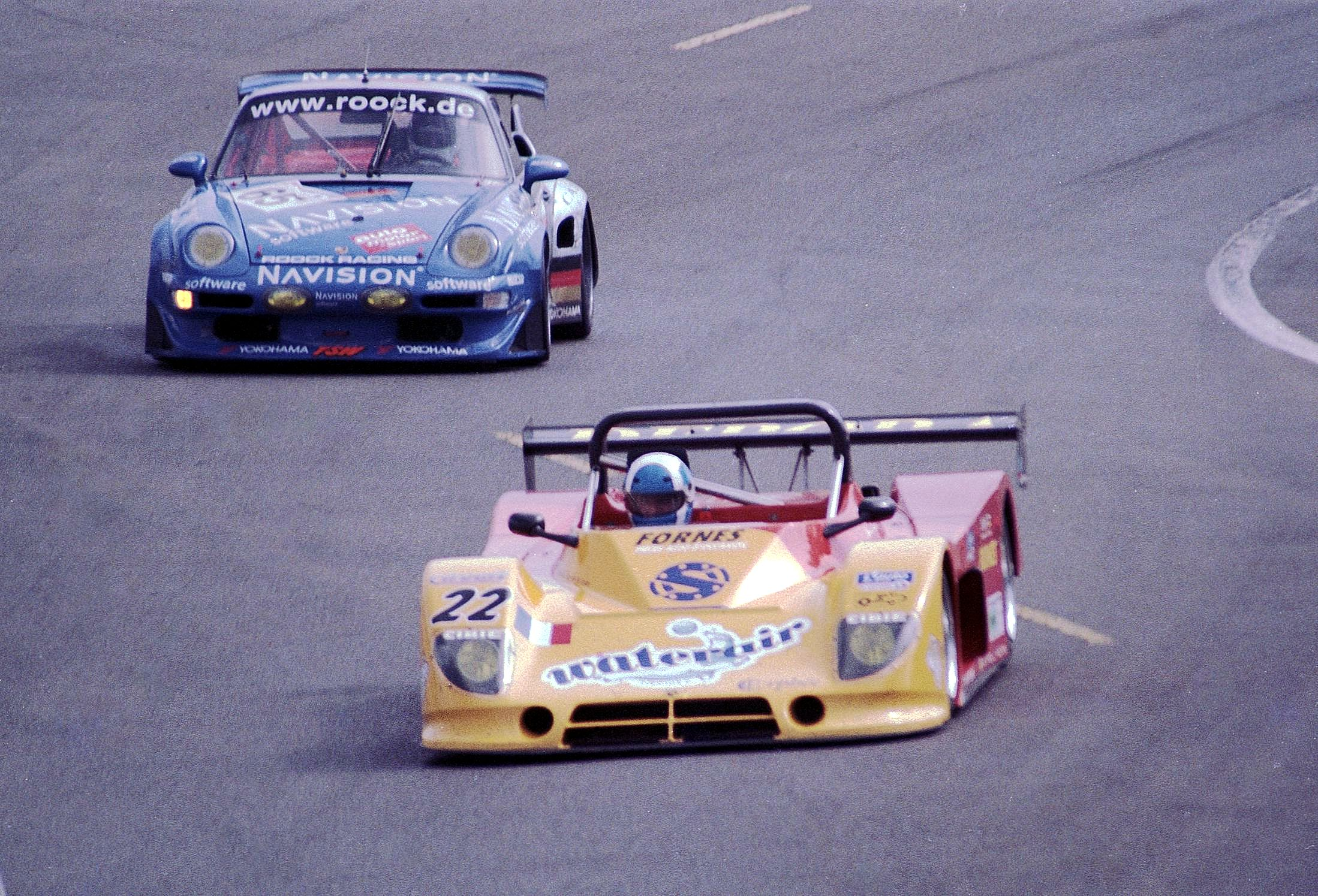
Debora LMP296

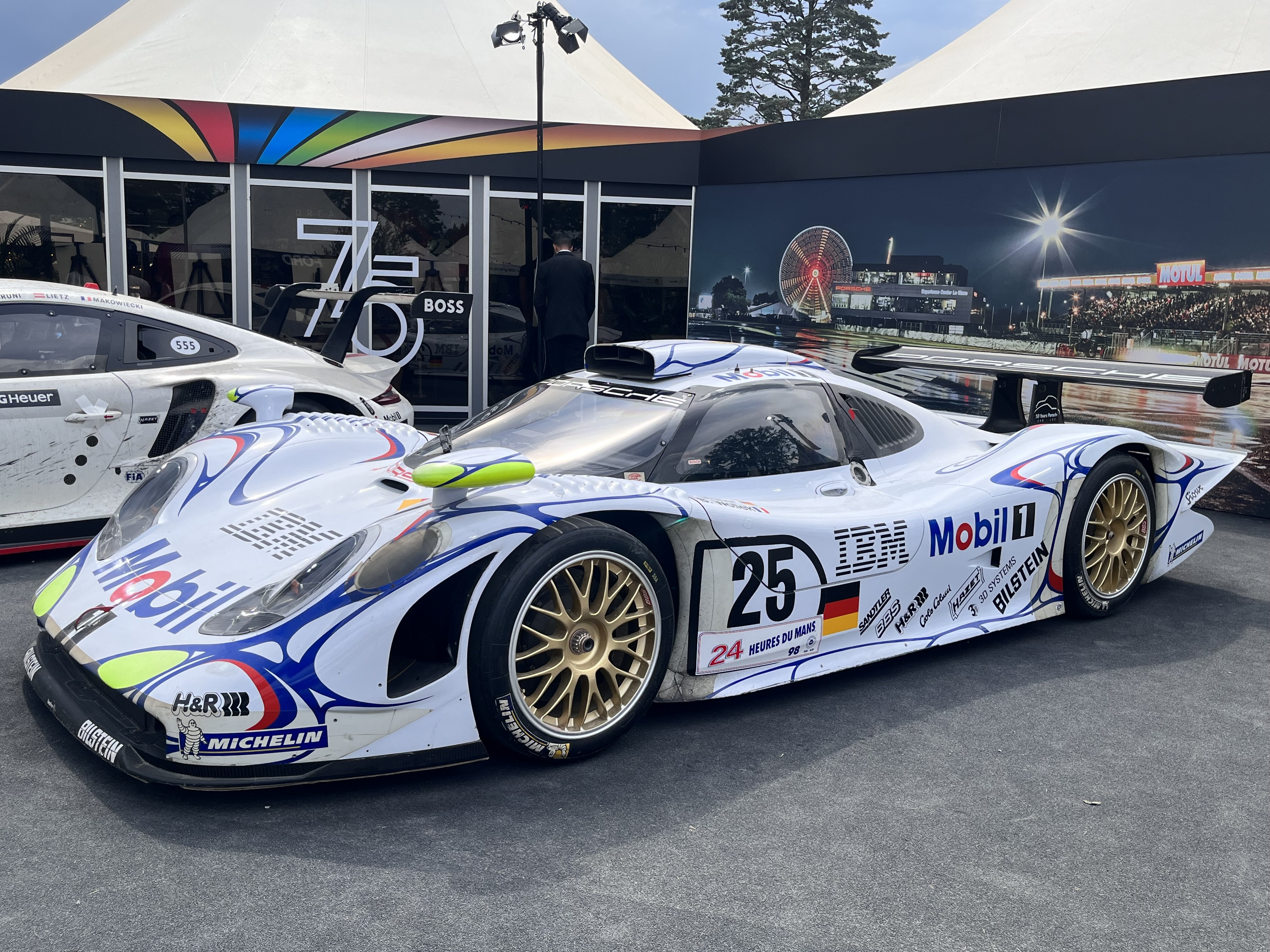
Porsche 911 GT1-98

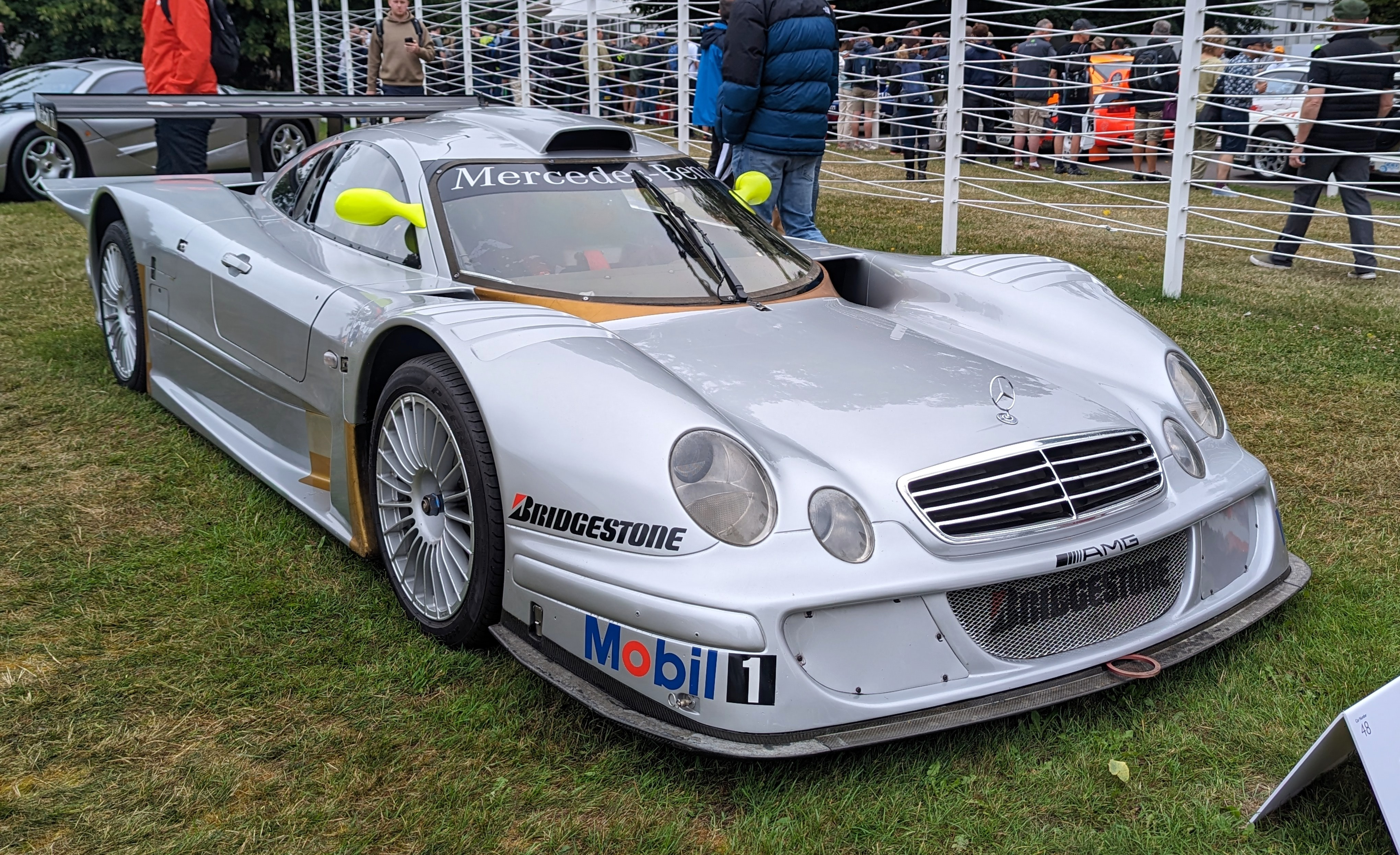
Mercedes-Benz CLK LM

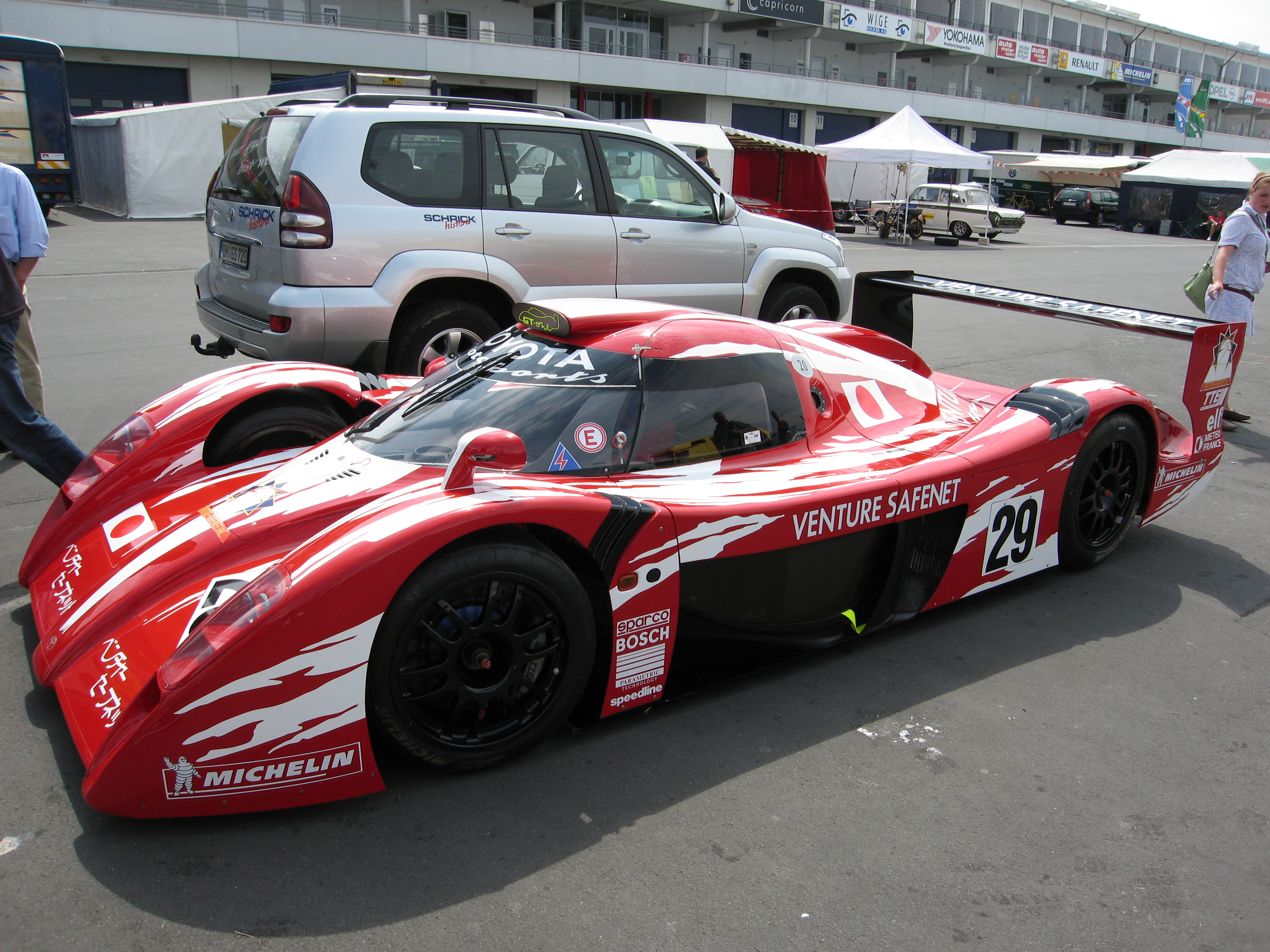
Toyota GT-One

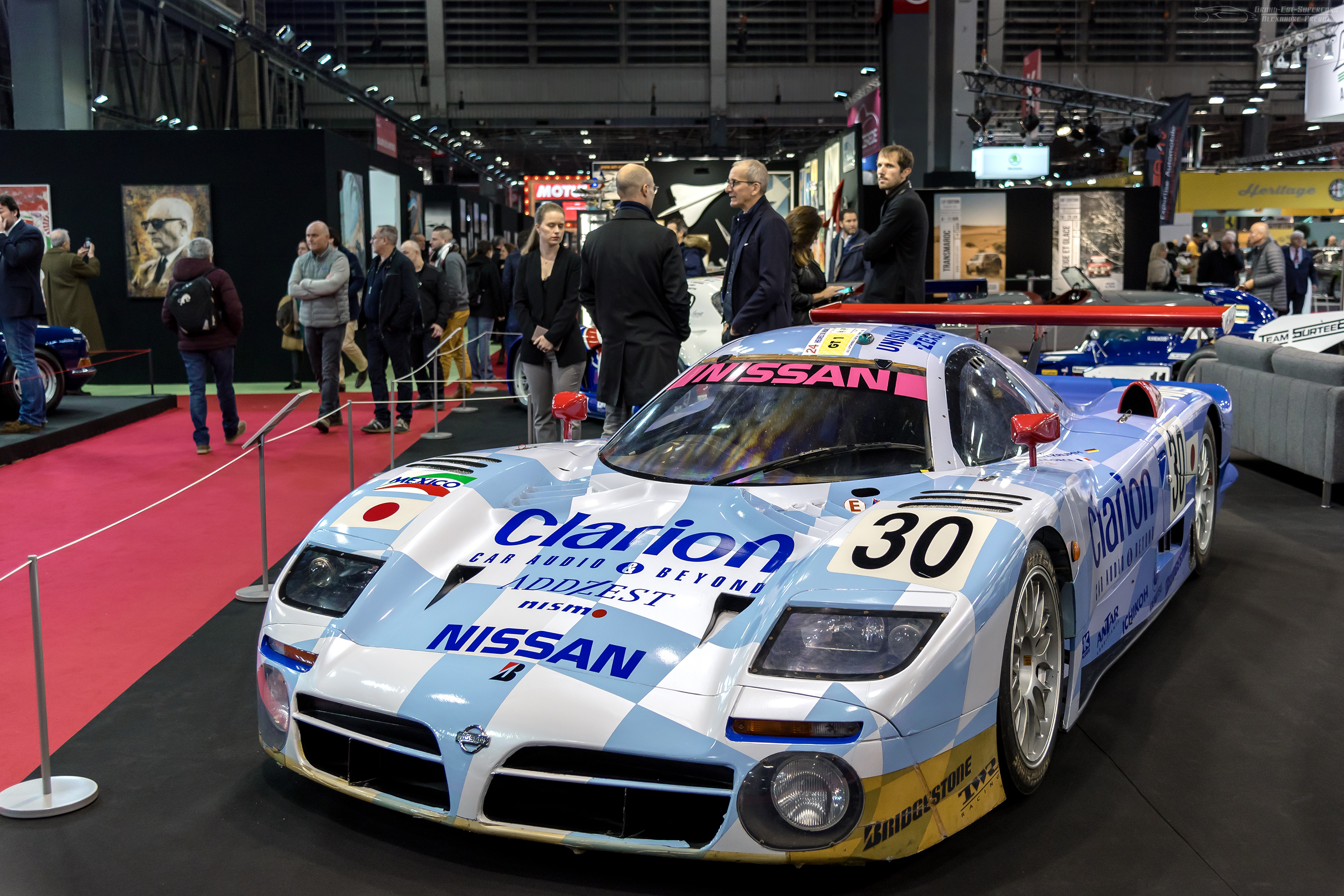
Nissan R390 GT1

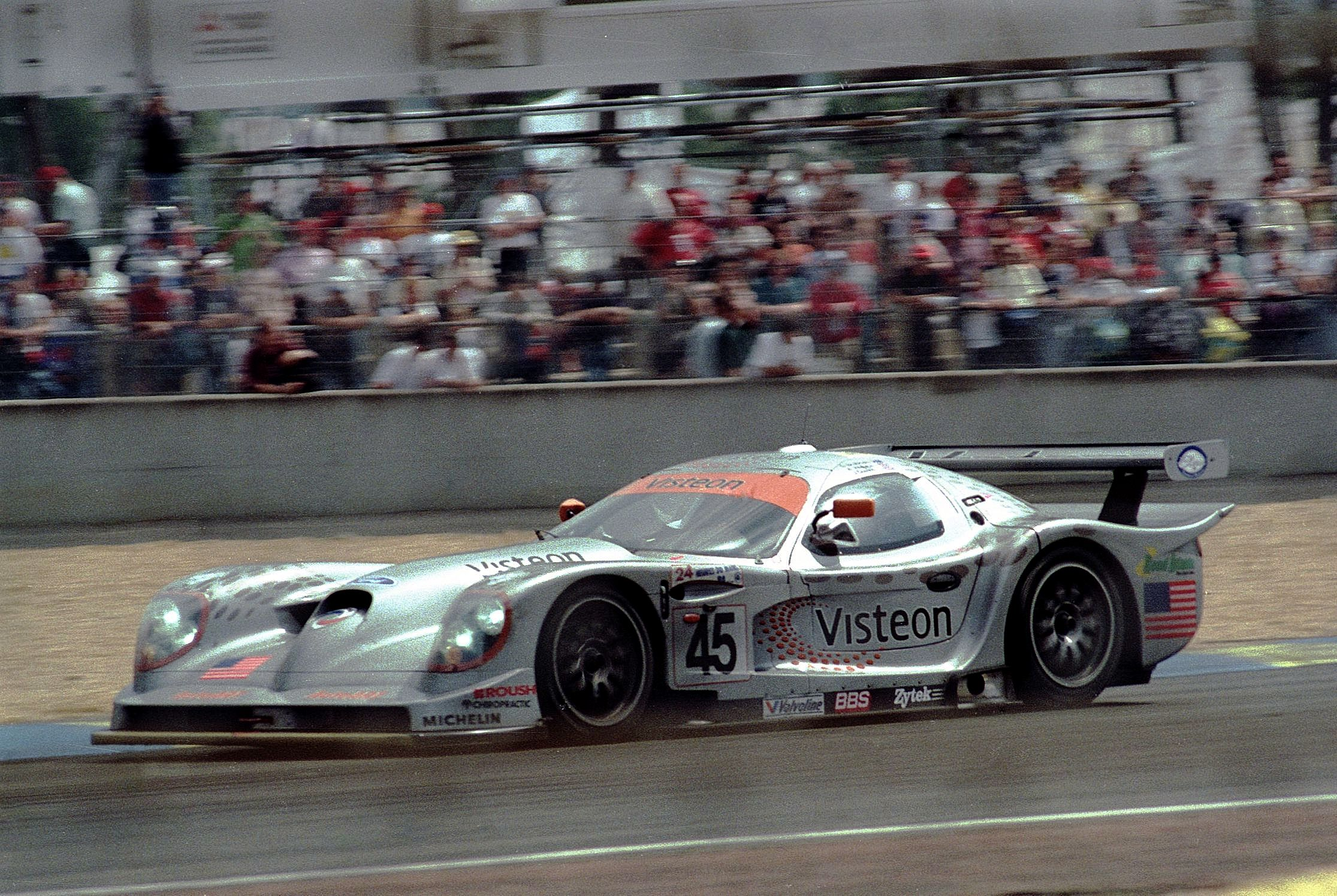
Panoz Esperante GTR-1

Debora was back on the grid for the first time since 1995, after missing the cut in 1996 (with the LMP296) and 1997 (LMP297). Didier Bonnet chose to reuse the LMP296 but replaced its 2.0-litre Cosworth with the reliable 10-year-old BMW M88 engine. Reduced to 3.2-litres, it put out 350 bhp. Despite being 50 kg over the class’s minimum weight, it was still easily the lightest car in the field, weighing just 700 kg.

=== LM GT1 ===
It was the 50th year since the founding of Porsche. For the third time, the works team brought the Porsche 911 GT1 to Le Mans. The new GT1-98 was another step up – now with a full honeycomb carbonfibre chassis, making them almost 100 kg lighter. The fuel cell was relocated to behind the driver rather than the usual front bonnet area for Porsches, as well as having the suspension and cooling revised. The turbo-charged flat-6 engine was bored out slightly from 3164cc to 3196cc and tuned to 600 bhp. Veteran works driver Bob Wollek (running in his 50th 24-hour race overall, including Daytona and Spa) led a squad of new, young works drivers, with regular Championship teammates Jörg Müller and Uwe Alzen. With Dalmas in the Joest prototype, his co-driver Allan McNish instead raced with Laurent Aïello and Stéphane Ortelli. A second pair of GT1-98s was to be run by the Zakspeed team, but they failed Pre-qualifying.

There was a lot of anticipation around the return of Mercedes to Le Mans after a 7-year absence. The works team had dominated the latter half of the previous season, winning the Drivers and Teams Championships. The new evolution of the Mercedes-Benz CLK was designed with Le Mans in mind, with its long straights, and was assigned to the subsidiary Mercedes-AMG company to build and prepare the cars. The CLK-LM was outwardly similar to the CLK-GTR but was now fitted with the shorter, lighter V8 iteration of the 6.0-litre M.119 engine. The ACO air restrictors limited it to 600 bhp, pushed through a transverse-mounted 6-speed paddle-shift gearbox. The engine, differential and gearbox were mid-mounted to the frame as a single unit, to allow ease of repair and replacement. The bodyshell was made by David Price’s DPS Composites in the UK. Slightly wider and longer than the GTR, the radiators were relocated to the sidepods and the extended tail accommodated the nominal, requisite “luggage-space”. Given gull-wing doors, reminiscent of the 1952-winning 300 SL, it was lower and sleeker. Over 10,000 km of endurance testing was done, although just two street-legal versions were built for homologation. A year earlier, Mercedes-Benz had considered their cars too new to tackle Le Mans. However, this year, confidence was high after the team won the first two rounds with the old GTR and arrived with two of the new cars. GT1 champion Bernd Schneider raced with his works teammates, triple-winner Klaus Ludwig and young rookie Mark Webber. The fourth regular driver, Ricardo Zonta, was paired with Jean-Marc Gounon and Christophe Bouchut, who usually ran a GTR in the ISRS for the Persson Motorsport customer-team.

Having won the race 3 years ago, the McLaren F1 GTR was now quickly becoming outdated, despite having started the 1997 season so successfully. So, this year only two of the cars were at Le Mans, entered by Michael Cane's GTC Gulf Team Davidoff taking advantage of their two automatic-entries. They were running the same long-tail configuration as the previous year with the car-owners bringing in professional drivers to race with them. Pink Floyd manager Steve O'Rourke had bought an ex-BMW works car and was running it in the British GT championship. With his regular teammate, Tim Sugden, he also brought in American Bill Auberlen. Thomas Bscher enlisted the touring-car veterans Emanuele Pirro and Rinaldo Capello despite their Le Mans inexperience. Both drivers were part of the Audi works team being formed for the 1999 season. The team was depending on the car's fuel efficiency and better reliability to give them a chance for the podium.

After giving the 1997 race a miss, Toyota returned this year with a bold new GT concept car. Like its competition, the GT-One (also known as the TS020) was a thinly-disguised sports-prototype with only two roadworthy versions made for homologation purposes. André de Cortanze (latterly at Peugeot and Sauber) was brought in as technical director and he hired Claude Martens as lead designer. The advanced composites-monocoque tub, built by Dornier Aerospace, was narrow with an integral roof and tapered to the front. The F1-style suspension had ABS-assisted carbon-brakes. The new R36V engine was a 3576cc 32-valve V8 built out of aluminium with twin Garrett turbos. With the ACO restrictors, it was limited to 600 bhp through its 6-speed gearbox. They were able to convince the ACO that the rear fuel-tank met the requirements for the mandatory “luggage-space”. Eighteen months out, Toyota Motorsport GmbH was given the job to prepare the cars. Previously running the successful Toyota rally team, they had controversially been disqualified and banned from the 1995 World Rally Championship for using illegal engine-kit. Extensive testing was done, including a 16-hour run at Spa. A strong driver line-up was assembled for a 3-car assault on Le Mans: Geoff Lees renewed his long association with Toyota. Former Le Mans winners Martin Brundle (Jaguar) and Éric Hélary (Peugeot) were brought in, as were ex-Porsche works drivers Thierry Boutsen, Ralf Kelleners and Emmanuel Collard. The third car had the all-Japanese crew of Ukyo Katayama, Toshio Suzuki and Keiichi Tsuchiya.

After a frustrating race in 1995, Nissan and TWR did extensive improvements on the R390 GT1 all built toward this one race for the season. Designer Tony Southgate now had the time to resolve the performance issues. Firstly, the tail unit was remodelled, bringing the rear wing forward, and creating the luggage-space that had previously caused so much trouble. The gearbox and brake-cooling systems were also redesigned, and the engine tuned for more power. Southgate reworked the suspension geometry, fitting it with ABS as well as traction control supplied by the Williams F1 team. When he found out that Toyota had got their workaround for their fuel tank/luggage-space he was furious. The team ran three 24-hour tests and covered over 40000 km, and when the cars lapped four seconds faster in Pre-qualifying than the previous year, hopes were high. Like Toyota, they brought three cars in the works team, with the experienced driver line-ups of John Nielsen/Franck Lagorce/Michael Krumm, Jan Lammers/Érik Comas/Andrea Montermini and the all-Japanese crew of JGTC works drivers Masahiko Kageyama and Kazuyoshi Hoshino, this year joined by Aguri Suzuki. A fourth R390 was entered by Nova Engineering, using the first chassis built, which had been raced by Riccardo Patrese at Le Mans the previous year.

The Panoz team was also back at Le Mans. In the close-season, Reynard Motorsport had worked on lengthening the bodyshell of the Esperante GTR-1 to improve its aerodynamics, while also widening the suspension for better handling. The Roush engine had its cooling, wiring and oil pressure reviewed and given the Zytek engine-management system as standard. The 6.0-litre Ford pushrod V8 was tuned up to 630 bhp. In the USA, the works team was dominating the two GT series, however they still had not completed a full 24-hour race. David Brabham and Éric Bernard were also doing double-duty in Europe with the French DAMS team. For Le Mans, Brabham raced in the American team, with Englishmen Andy Wallace and Jamie Davies. Bernard, meanwhile, ran the DAMS car alongside Christophe Tinseau and American Johnny O'Connell. Panoz also brought the ground-breaking, new Q9 Hybrid. Developed in conjunction with Zytek Engineering, it utilised their Nickel-metal hydride battery electric motor and their KERS system. Weighing 100 kg, it was nominally to add an extra 160 bhp power. James Weaver ran it for David Price's team in the pre-Qualifying. However, it missed out when a failure on its electric motor left it carrying the excess weight but without the power. At the time, the ACO regulations did not have provision for its innovation as a “wild-card” entry, per its later “Garage 56” policy. Well ahead of its time, it would be 13 years before another hybrid raced at Le Mans.

=== LM GT2 ===
As usual for Le Mans, Porsche had, by far, the biggest contingent in GT2 with 12 of the 18 entries, all using the 993 GT2 iteration. Last year’s class winners, the small Elf Haberthur team, stepped up bringing two cars this year. Both cars were running in the Championship and their drivers Michel Neugarten and Éric Graham led the team. A notable co-driver was art-dealer Hervé Poulain, who decorated his car as the last of his famous “art-cars”. The Porsche was given a risqué paintjob by French cartoonist Georges Wolinski. The leading Porsche teams from 1997 also entered a pair each: Roock Racing’s first car was led by Claudia Hürtgen. The second car gained entry after the withdrawal of the Saleen Mustang of Cirtek Motorsport. Konrad Motorsport had team-owner Franz Konrad and Toni Seiler in their respective cars. Larbre Compétition was not running in the Championship this year but continued their partnership with Jean-Luc Chéreau with their second car. The other four cars were new privateer entrants, including that of Frenchman Michel Nourry, who had bought an ex-Larbre Porsche 911 Evo for its fourth consecutive Le Mans, with the experienced Jean-Louis Ricci as co-driver.

Porsche’s main opposition would again be from the Dodge Viper, championed again by the French ORECA team leading, with the British Chamberlain Engineering team in support. ORECA had won the GT2 championship in 1997. A lot of wind-tunnel work had been done on the aerodynamics resulting in a remodelled nose-section and underbody. Oil and fuel consumption were improved with a revised exhaust and fuelling system. Even revising the electrical wiring trimmed 40 kg of weight. ORECA brought their three new chassis running in the GT Championship, fitted with carbon brakes and ABS. The regular line-up of Olivier Beretta and Pedro Lamy (who had won the class in the opening two rounds), Justin Bell (the GT2 Drivers Champion), David Donohue (another son of a famous driver) and Karl Wendlinger was built up with sometime Viper drivers Tommy Archer, Marc Duez, Luca Drudi and Patrick Huisman. In contrast, the Chamberlain cars (also in the ISRS Championship), not having the finances of ORECA, ran with ferrous brakes with one of the cars being an older ex-ORECA chassis.

== Practice and Qualifying ==
Pre-Qualification in May saw several cars fail scrutineering: both the works Lister Storm and RJ Racing’s Helem V6 had such major rework of their rear ends that the judges felt they no longer resembled the homologated GT examples. As previously, the entries were divided into two groups of qualifiers where the slowest entries in each class would be eliminated. Such was the advance over the last year in GT1 with the arrival of Mercedes, Nissan and Toyota, that the customer Porsche and McLaren teams were left struggling. McNish put in the fastest time in the works Porsche, with Toyota (Brundle) and Mercedes-Benz (Schneider) within a half-second. That sparring continued with race-week qualifying. Brundle had the honours after the first session on Wednesday (3:36.6), with the Toyota over a second clear of Schneider’s Mercedes-Benz, while McNish could not get a clear lap. By Thursday, Toyota and Porsche were fitting their race engines and gearboxes for set-up. That left Mercedes to charge for glory and Schneider obliged with a scintillating lap to claim pole (3:35.5). Brundle’s lap on Wednesday was good enough to keep second. Bouchut got the other Mercedes-Benz up to third (3:36.9) with the works Porsches next, Müller just 0.3sec ahead of McNish (3:38.4). A concern though for Toyota was that during practice, Brundle’s car had a differential failure and the other two had gear-selection issues. The works Nissans all went faster than Blundell had the previous year, however the best they could do was Nielsen getting to 10th on the grid (3:40.6). Fortunate to have their two automatic entries, the McLarens qualified at the back of the GT1 field (23rd and 24th, 3:50.6), 15 seconds behind the Mercedes-Benz. In contrast, Brabham qualified his Panoz 11th (3:40.7), almost 8 seconds faster than its time the year before.

To be competitive, with their smaller 80-litre fuel tanks and tighter air restrictors, the prototypes would have to be much faster. However, qualifying showed that this still had not happened. Fastest in the Pre-Qualification was the Momo Ferrari (3:41.0) just ahead of Martini in the BMW. The WR team, looking to move up from LMP2 with two of their new LMP98 design failed to qualify. Come race-week though, Martini qualified 6th overall (3:38.8) as the best of the prototypes, with his teammate 12th. Alboreto struggled with understeer but qualified the double race-winning Joest Porsche 9th (3:40.5) although the sister car was well back in 20th after a gearbox failure. The two new Courages were 15th and 16th (3:43s). The Ferraris had lost their pace, with Bouillon in the JB car being the best (3:44.5, 17th) a second ahead of the two American entries. However, the JB engine split an oil-line and its crew had to replace the whole rear-end in less than three hours to get Sospiri qualified. The Riley & Scott qualified 26th (3:54.3), opting for a cautious approach after Gache spun the car at Tertre Rouge on Thursday, smashing up the right rear-end.

The little Debora LMP296 lapped 5 seconds slower than the LMP297 had in 1997 that failed to qualify but got through as the sole entry in the class to start 40th (4:09.5), amongst the GT2s. In GT2 itself, the ORECA Vipers were five seconds faster than their qualifying pace the year before. Olivier Beretta became the first driver in GT2 to lap the Sarthe circuit in under 4 minutes (3:59.98). The ORECA team dominated practice, taking three of the top four places in the class. Several GT2 pre-qualifiers were withdrawn before qualifying week. These included a fourth entry from the Viper Team ORECA and the Saleen Mustang of the British Cirtek team. This opened the door to the French Helem reserve entry however come race week it once again failed scrutineering.

=== Starting Grid ===
Class leaders are in ‘’’bold’’’.

Pos	Class	Team	Pos	Class	Team
Pos	Class	Car	Pos	Class	Car
Pos	Class	Time	Pos	Class	Time
1	LM-GT1	#35 AMG Mercedes	2	LM-GT1	#28 Toyota Motorsport
1	LM-GT1	Mercedes-Benz CLK LM	2	LM-GT1	Toyota GT-One
1	LM-GT1	3:35.54	2	LM-GT1	3:36.55
3	LM-GT1	#36 AMG Mercedes	4	LM-GT1	#25 Porsche AG
3	LM-GT1	Mercedes-Benz CLK-LM	4	LM-GT1	Porsche 911 GT1-98
3	LM-GT1	3:36.90	4	LM-GT1	3:38.08
5	LM-GT1	#26 Porsche AG	6	LM-P1	#2 BMW Motorsport
5	LM-GT1	Porsche 911 GT1-98	6	LM-P1	BMW V12LM
5	LM-GT1	3:38.41	6	LM-P1	3:38.83
7	LM-GT1	#29 Toyota Motorsport	8	LM-GT1	#27 Toyota Motorsport
7	LM-GT1	Toyota GT-One	8	LM-GT1	Toyota GT-One
7	LM-GT1	3:40.04	8	LM-GT1	3:40.47
9	LM-P1	#7 Joest Racing	10	LM-GT1	#30 NISMO
9	LM-P1	Porsche LMP1-98	10	LM-GT1	Nissan R390 GT1
9	LM-P1	3:40.50	10	LM-GT1	3:40.65
11	LM-GT1	#45 Panoz Motorsport	12	LM-P1	#1 BMW Motorsport
11	LM-GT1	Panoz Esperante GTR-1	12	LM-P1	BMW V12LM
11	LM-GT1	3:40.73	12	LM-P1	3:41.60
13	LM-GT1	#31 NISMO	14	LM-GT1	#32 NISMO
13	LM-GT1	Nissan R390 GT1	14	LM-GT1	Nissan R390 GT1
13	LM-GT1	3:41.62	14	LM-GT1	3:42.40
15	LM-P1	#14 Courage Compétition	16	LM-P1	#13 Courage Compétition
15	LM-P1	Courage C51	16	LM-P1	Courage C51
15	LM-P1	3:43.24	16	LM-P1	3:43.47
17	LM-P1	#5 JB Racing	18	LM-GT1	#44 DAMS
17	LM-P1	Ferrari 333SP-98	18	LM-GT1	Panoz Esperante GTR-1
17	LM-P1	3:44.46	18	LM-GT1	3:44.60
19	LM-GT1	#33 NISMO	20	LM-P1	#8 Joest Racing
19	LM-GT1	Nissan R390 GT1	20	LM-P1	Porsche LMP1-98
19	LM-GT1	3:45.29	20	LM-P1	3:45.45
21	LM-P1	#3 Momo Racing	22	LM-P1	#12 Doyle-Risi Racing
21	LM-P1	Ferrari 333SP	22	LM-P1	Ferrari 333SP
21	LM-P1	3:45.75	22	LM-P1	3:46.29
23	LM-GT1	#41 GTC Gulf Team Davidoff	24	LM-GT1	#40 GTC Gulf Team Davidoff
23	LM-GT1	McLaren F1 GTR 97	24	LM-GT1	McLaren F1 GTR 97
23	LM-GT1	3:50.57	24	LM-GT1	3:50.86
25	LM-P1	#15 La Filière Elf	26	LM-P1	#21 Solution F
25	LM-P1	Courage C36	26	LM-P1	Riley & Scot Mk3
25	LM-P1	3:51.54	26	LM-P1	3:54.27
27	LM-P1	#24 Team AM-PM	28	LM-P1	#10 Pilot BSM Racing
27	LM-P1	Courage C50	28	LM-P1	Ferrari 333SP
27	LM-P1	3:56.66	28	LM-P1	3:57.55
29	LM-P1	#16 Kremer Racing	30	LM-GT2	#51 Viper Team ORECA
29	LM-P1	Kremer K8	30	LM-GT2	Chrysler Viper GTS-R
29	LM-P1	3:57.81	30	LM-GT2	3:59.98
31	LM-GT2	#50 Viper Team ORECA	32	LM-GT2	#60 Chéreau Sports
31	LM-GT2	Chrysler Viper GTS-R	32	LM-GT2	Porsche 911 GT2
31	LM-GT2	4:05.01	32	LM-GT2	4:05.01
33	LM-GT2	#53 Viper Team ORECA	34	LM-GT2	#70 Konrad Motorsport
33	LM-GT2	Chrysler Viper GTS-R	34	LM-GT2	Porsche 911 GT2
33	LM-GT2	4:05.65	34	LM-GT2	4:06.11
35	LM-GT2	#64 Roock Racing Team	36	LM-GT2	#72 Larbre Compétition
35	LM-GT2	Porsche 911 GT2	36	LM-GT2	Porsche 911 GT2
35	LM-GT2	4:06.21	36	LM-GT2	4:06.51
37	LM-GT2	#67 Elf Haberthur Racing	38	LM-GT2	#55 Chamberlain Engineering
37	LM-GT2	Porsche 911 GT2	38	LM-GT2	Chrysler Viper GTS-R
37	LM-GT2	4:08.33	38	LM-GT2	4:08.96
39	LM-GT2	#71 Estoril Racing	40	LM-P2	#22 Didier Bonnet
39	LM-GT2	Porsche 911 GT2	40	LM-P2	Debora LMP2-96
39	LM-GT2	4:09.26	40	LM-P2	4:09.45
41	LM-GT2	#56 Chamberlain Engineering	42	LM-GT2	#62 CJ Motorsports
41	LM-GT2	Chrysler Viper GTS-R	42	LM-GT2	Porsche 911 GT2
41	LM-GT2	4:09.68	42	LM-GT2	4:10.22
43	LM-GT2	#61 Krauss Race Sports	44	LM-GT2	#65 Roock Racing Team
43	LM-GT2	Porsche 911 GT2	44	LM-GT2	Porsche 911 GT2
43	LM-GT2	4:11.61	44	LM-GT2	4:11.91
45	LM-GT2	#69 M. Nourry	46	LM-GT2	#73 Konrad Motorsport
45	LM-GT2	Porsche 911 GT2	46	LM-GT2	Porsche 911 GT2
45	LM-GT2	4:19.48	46	LM-GT2	4:20.43
47	LM-GT2	#68 Elf Haberthur Racing	48		
47	LM-GT2	Porsche 911 GT2	48		
47	LM-GT2	4:23.66	48		

== Race ==
=== Start ===
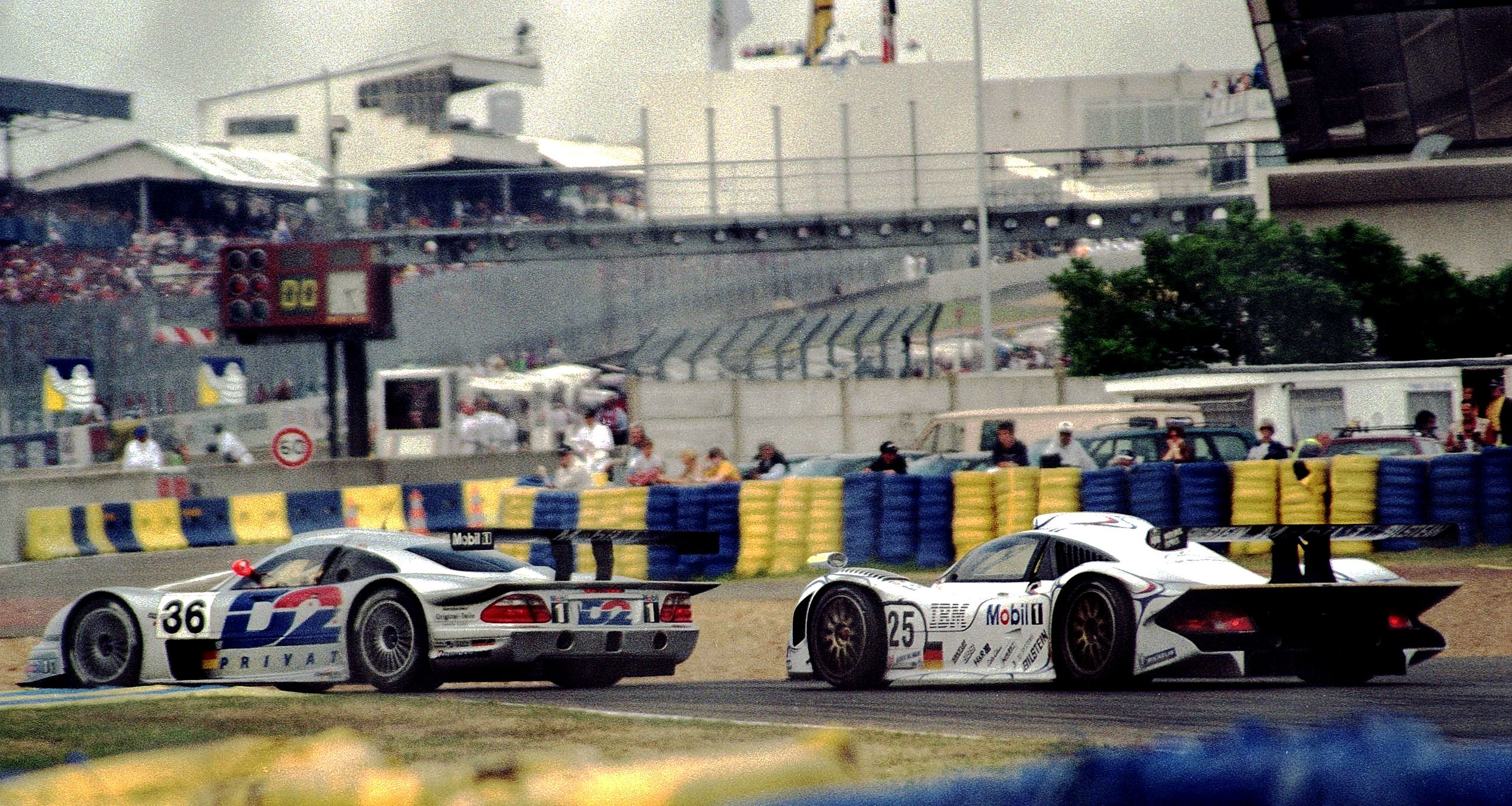
Mercedes leading Porsche into the Ford Chicane

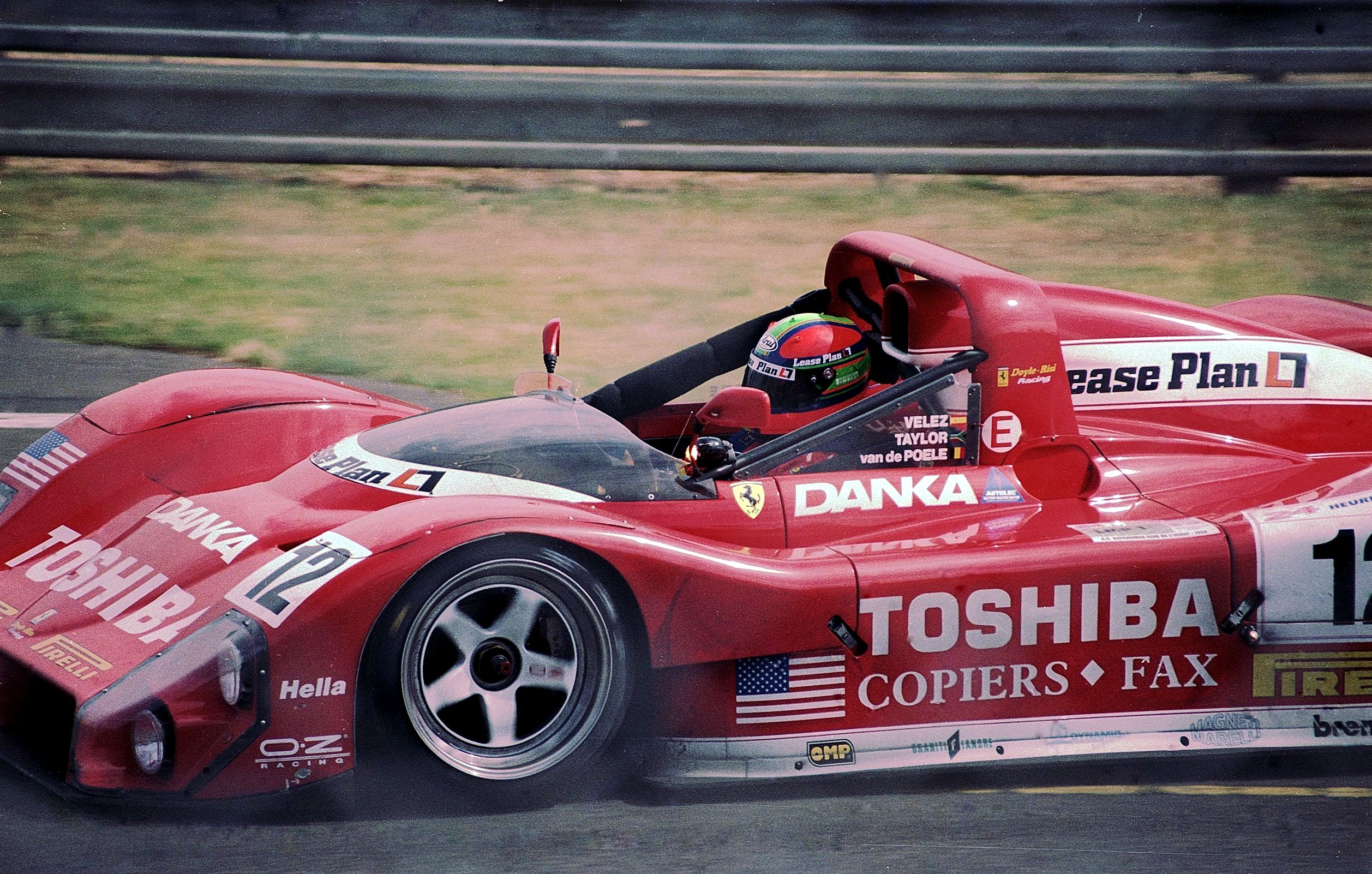
Doyle-Risi Racing Ferrari 333 SP

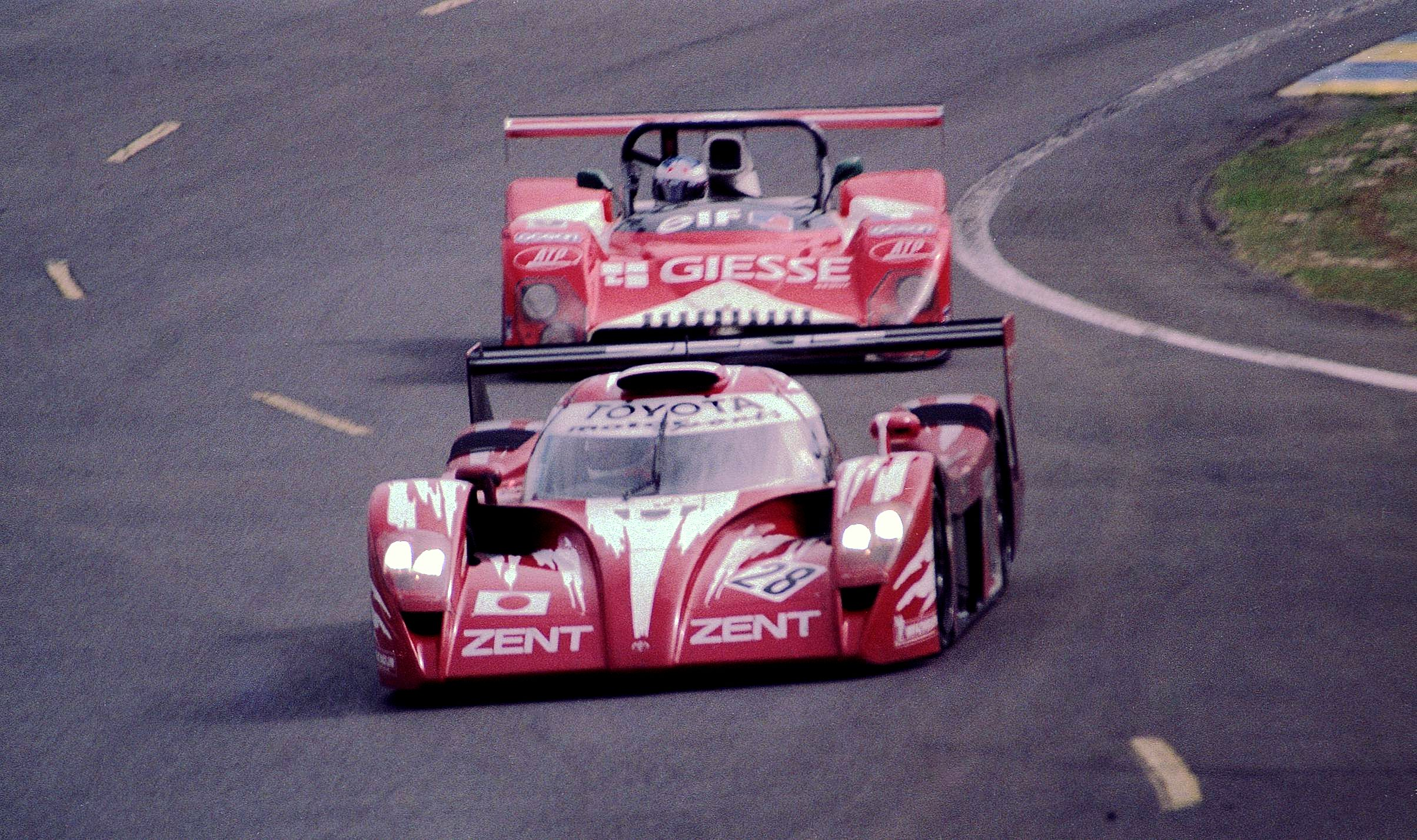
Toyota GT-One lapping the JB Racing Ferrari in the Esses

After a massive thunderstorm overnight, there was light drizzle in the morning for the race warm-up. By the time the cars pulled away from the grid it had eased, and it soon became sunny. At flagfall, Brundle and Schneider went through the first curve side-by-side, with the Mercedes only getting the lead by late-braking at the Dunlop chicane. Not to be denied, Brundle blew past on the back straight and together they started pulling out a gap on the field. At the start, Martini had leap-frogged the others and put the BMW into third. The other Toyotas were on the move, and within a half-hour, Boutsen was up to second and Suzuki in fourth. The BMWs were next, scrapping with the works Porsches and the second Mercedes. In tenth was the JB Ferrari with two of the Nissans right behind.

The new German teams had a poor race: Schneider lasted only 19 laps, and 70 minutes, until pulling over onto the pit-exit while running second. A steering pump had broken, and the hydraulic failure left the engine without lubrication and power steering. Not allowed to be reversed the 100 metres down the pitlane to his crew, the car was stranded. The same issue hit Bouchut, in the sister car, in the third hour. Both of the BMWs were also out before nightfall. Martini’s hard driving was undone when he collided with Thévenin’s Courage soon after refuelling, that dropped him down the order. A subsequent stop found faulty seals on his wheelbearings. Soper was called in while leading the prototype class and found to have the same issue, and both cars were retired for safety reasons. Ninety minutes in, van der Poele brought the Doyle-Risi Ferrari to the pits without a wheel. Throughout the opening stint, Taylor had found the car almost undriveable and the front suspension had finally failed. Losing 5 laps with repairs, the car was a different beast afterward and ran faultlessly thereafter, much to the drivers’ delight. Not so for the JB Ferrari. Bouillon and Sospiri had got themselves up to 7th chasing the BMW until they too were waylaid by a wheelbearing issue. Falling four laps behind, they spent 9 hours getting back to 7th just to have the gearbox fail in the middle of the night. All this left the two Toyotas ahead of the works Porsche and so it stayed until 5.30pm when Hélary, in the leading Toyota, had a big spin at the Ford Chicane. Bearing failure had compromised the front brakes, necessitating several pit-stops to sort the issue, costing them 8 laps eventually and leaving them 23rd. Soon after Hélary’s issues, the Japanese-driven Toyota, running in 5th, also lost a lot of time fixing a gearshift breakage. Losing nearly an hour in the pits left them 22 laps behind and at the back of the field. But from this, the sister car of Boutsen/Lees/Kelleners took over the lead and held it going into dusk.

Approaching the four-hour mark, at 6pm, the GTs dominated the top-10. Two of the Toyotas were in the pits, with the two Porsches chasing the other one for the lead. After a careful start, the Nissans had picked up their pace and the Nielsen and Lammers cars were now running 4th and 5th. Until its imminent demise, the remaining BMW that had been running fourth was now 6th ahead of the Joest-Porsche and Cottaz’s new Courage. The third works Nissan was 9th ahead of the second Joest car. As the BMWs fell away, the Courage and Joest prototypes settled into the middle of the top-10, within reach of the leaders. However, it would not be a third win for the Alboreto/Johansson/Dalmas Joest. Running a strong sixth mid-evening, the engine suddenly shut off when the flywheel broke, smashing the ignition and leaving Alboreto stranded out on the track. In GT2, after showing their power in qualifying, the Vipers took a conservative approach in the race and ceded the lead to the Porsches. Initially, Jean-Pierre Jarier led in the Larbre car, then the Roock and Konrad Porsches took over. By the third hour though, the Vipers had moved up to run 1-2 in class. Then Huisman brought the second-placed Viper into the pit-lane with an electrical short-circuit. He was marooned for over an hour at pit-entry trying to fashion an improvised repair, with verbal help from his crew standing beside him, just to spark enough to get to his pit-box. But with no luck, the car had to be retired. Pedro Lamy, in the sister car, held the class lead for four hours until having to pit to repair a broken exhaust costing 18 minutes, then soon after that, fixing the gear selector broke losing another 22 minutes and dropping them down to 9th in class. A serious accident for the Konrad Porsche happened in the 5th hour when Nick Ham crashed at the Mulsanne corner and somersaulted over the fencing. Several spectators were slightly injured by gravel and debris from the rear wing and the driver was a bit shocked and bruised. The Debora had moved up to 30th after the first hour before driveshaft failure delayed them and then a broken gearbox forced retirement before midnight.

=== Night ===
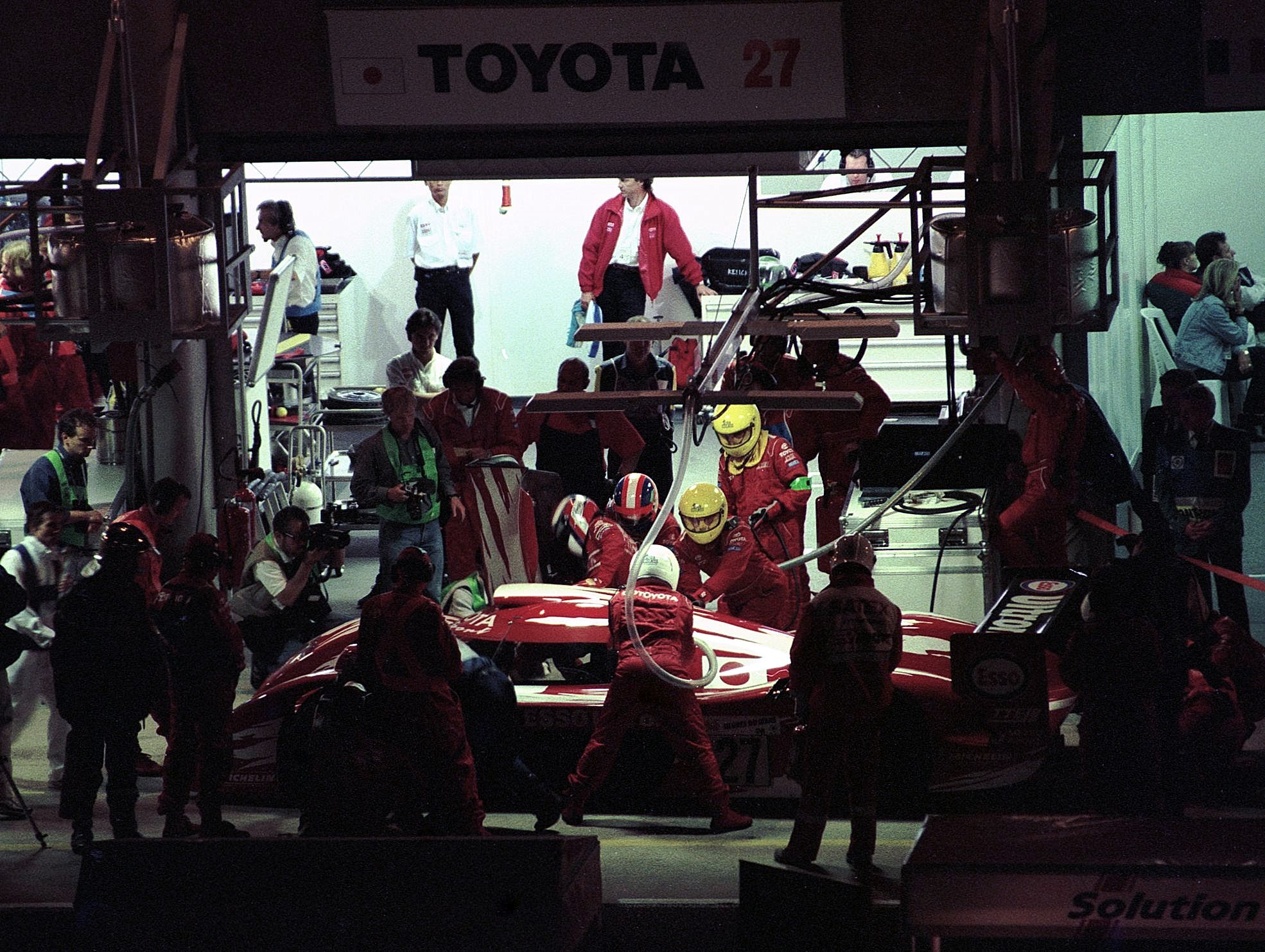
Nighttime refuelling for Toyota #27

At 10:40pm, as night fell, Lees brought his Toyota in from the lead to get gearbox repairs. The pitcrew replaced the gear-cluster in just 16 minutes and he resumed back in 7th, albeit four laps down. Having not had any gearing failures in testing, this was getting very concerning for the team. This put the Porsche GT1s into the 1-2 position. At midnight, after 10 hours of racing, they were still leading, changing places at the fuel stops. The Nielsen/Lagorce/Krumm Nissan had steadily moved up the field and was now 3rd, ahead of the Cottaz Courage and Joest prototypes and the Japanese Nissan in 6th. The Nova Nissan was running well in 8th with David Brabham’s Panoz, the JB and Momo Ferrari 333s behind. The fourth Nissan was 12th, ahead of the two McLarens keeping in touch.

In the early hours of Sunday morning, the first of several showers came across the circuit and the two Porsches continued swapping the lead back and forth through the rain until a strong shift by McNish, staying on slicks in the inclement weather, was able to build a 1-lap lead over his teammates by 4am. Through the night several cars had issues. Just after midnight, the Panoz spent a half-hour in the pits. The pit-crew replaced the whole dashboard to resolve an electrical problem when the rear tail-lights cut out. Two of the Nissans had issues through the night: the recovering Lammers Nissan changed all four brake discs after 1am, falling out of the top-10. The Nielsen Nissan had been in third place for four hours. Soon after 4am they spent 12 minutes in the pits getting a broken fuel-pump replaced, dropping three places. At 4.45am, Murry was caught out as a shower swept the track. The 7th-placed Joest car went off in the Porsche Curves, carving up the rear-end. Repairs took 25 minutes only for the rear cover to fly off on Weaver’s out-lap, terminally damaging the rear wing. Just as the night was ending, the excellent run for the Courage team faltered. Third overall, and leading the prototype class, Goossens pitted at 4.40am to fix a broken throttle cable. Four hours later, a gearbox collapse forced their retirement.

=== Morning ===
Lees, Boutsen and Kelleners drove hard through the night to gradually make back time. A sudden squall swept across the circuit just before 6am, completely changing the track in only one lap. Müller was caught out on slicks in the leading Porsche. Missing his braking, he bounced through the gravel at the first Mulsanne chicane and had to slowly limp back to the pits for repairs. Ten minutes later, it got worse for Porsche when McNish came in with an overheating engine due to a broken waterhose. Over the next quarter-hour, Lees (staying on slicks) pulled back the laps, taking the lead at 6.20am and then building his own. McNish rejoined three laps down, in second while Alzen returned, after a half-hour stop, in fourth, behind the Nissan and four laps down. An hour earlier to Müller’s escapade, Brundle had also crashed, at the Ford Chicane. Despite having recently set the fastest lap of the race and getting back up to 14th, in Brundle’s case the damage to the rear-end of the Toyota was too severe and the car was retired. At 7.50am, the leading Toyota pitted for another new gear cluster to repair 5th gear. Now well-practiced with the fault, the crew this time turned it around in only ten minutes, along with a brakepad change. The three lead cars were now on the same lap and barely 2 minutes apart, with Ortelli, in the Porsche back in front and going flat out. Thrilling the crowd through the morning, the Toyota and first Porsche stayed on that same lap for five hours, without letting up. The Porsches tried triple-stinting their tyres to save time, but the better speed of the Toyota gradually allowed Boutsen to overtake and then pull away, putting a lap on the 3rd-placed Porsche.

=== Finish and post-race ===
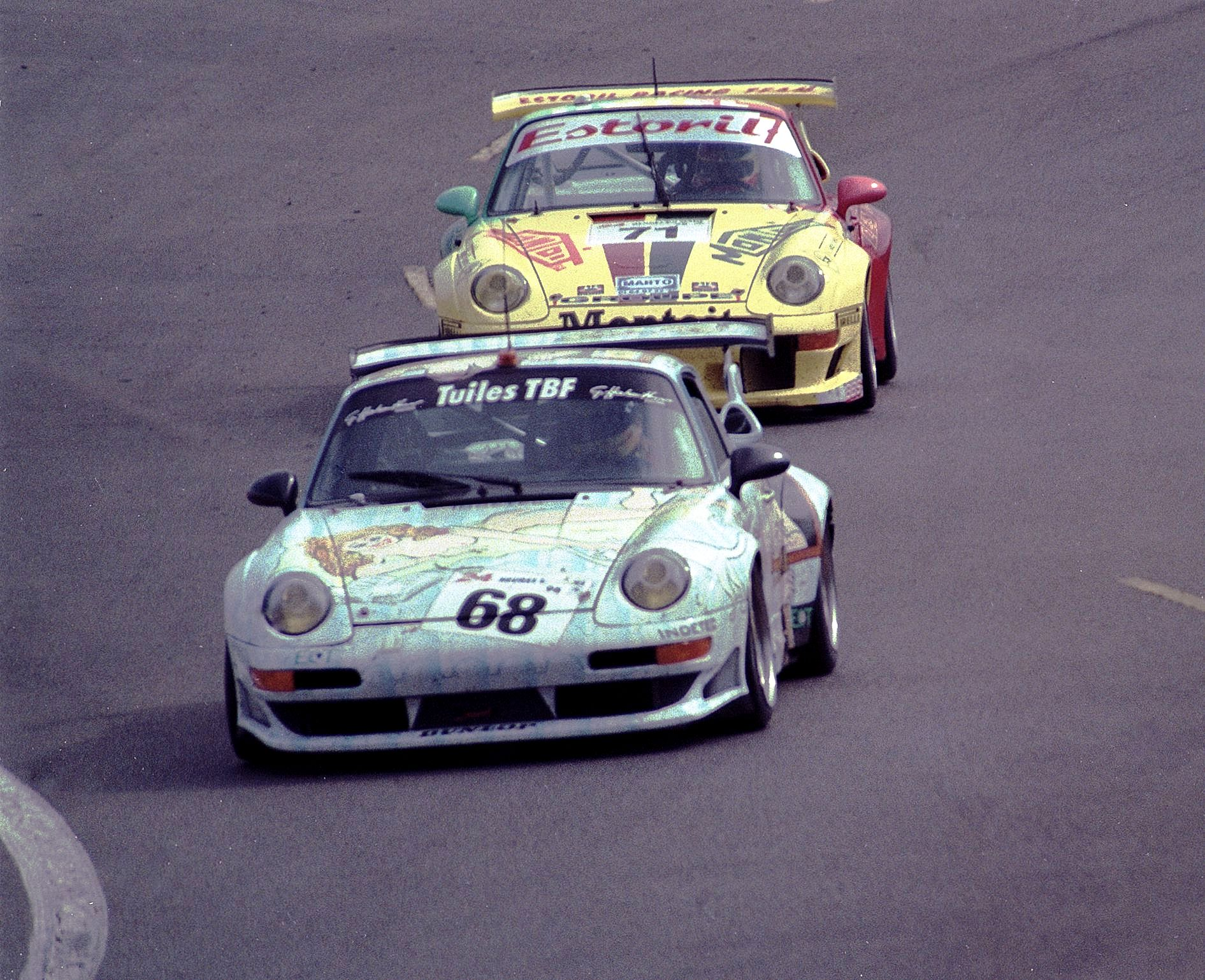
Privateer Porsches in GT2: the Elf Haberthur 'art-car' leading the Estoril car

The duel was finally broken at 12.35pm, with less than 90 minutes to go. Boutsen had a 45-second lead over McNish, each with one pitstop remaining. It was then that the Toyota’s gearbox broke coming out of Mulsanne and for the second year in a row, Kelleners lost a winning position within sight of the finish. Thereafter, with a three-lap gap to the nearest Nissan, McNish and Alzen were able to drop their lap times by four seconds to get to the finish and ensure Porsche’s record-extending 16th victory. On the podium, an emotional Bob Wollek was visibly upset realising that possibly his best chance of a coveted Le Mans victory had gone. The Nissan was third after a trouble-free run, with the company’s best finish to date. Furthermore, it was the first podium finish at Le Mans for an all-Japanese crew. Meanwhile, the Nielsen car that had been running just behind it had pitted around midday to reattach its undertray. Costing five laps, it resumed down in 7th, behind their team-mates. With some hard driving by Lagorce in the last two hours he managed to overtake them to finish fifth. Overall, a far improved performance from Nissan saw the whole team finish – in 3rd, 5th and 6th. The Nova Nissan was 10th after their own drive back through the field from 25th. They had lost almost 90 minutes during the night after Kageyama had spun backwards into a wall damaging the rear end, undertray and left turbo. Despite being an increasingly outdated model, the McLaren of the GTC team finished a creditable fourth after a very reliable run, with owner Steve O’Rourke proudly taking the chequered flag for his team. They had only spent 40 minutes in the pits, half an hour less than the winning car. Their biggest scare was at their final pitstop, when the car would not restart because of a flat battery. Equally thrilled with their finish was the Panoz team, coming home in 7th after a very reliable run through the second half of the race.

Eighth was the Doyle-Risi Ferrari, winning the LM-P1 class in a race of attrition. That win was the first class-victory for Ferrari since 1981, when Jean-Claude Andruet and Claude Ballot-Léna won their IMSA-GTX class. The Momo Ferrari had run through the night just out of the top-10. Then at breakfast time, they spent 90 minutes replacing the gearbox. Returning to the race in 18th, they fought hard over the next five hours to finish 14th. Ninth was the only Toyota to finish. The Japanese-crewed team had come back after their gearbox replacement the evening before. Unable to make any laps back, they benefitted from others having bigger problems. Martin Brundle gave this perspective on the Toyota effort:

”This is TTE’s first motor race, we’ve led convincingly with two different cars and we’ve got one to the finish - that’s better than we could have hoped for.”

Second in the LM-P1 class went to the old Kremer K8, that finished 12th overall. In what would be the Kremer prototype's swansong, they came home 18 laps (300 km) behind the Ferrari.

The GT2 class-victory went to the ORECA Viper of Bell/Donohue/Drudi after a clean race, free of issues. Having led the class throughout the Sunday, they were never headed and finished 11th overall. The win was the first GT class win for an American-made car since the Shelby Daytona won in 1964. Second in class, and coming home 13th, were teammates Beretta/Lamy/Archer. After their early gear selector issues when leading, they had moved up the field as the Porsches had their issues, finishing 5 laps back. This was at the expense of the Roock Porsche that had led in the first two hours and then run second to the Bell Viper for the whole second half of the race. They had lost that second place though at 11am when Claudia Hürtgen brought the Porsche in to get a gearbox change. Losing two hours, they eventually finished 17th, 32 laps back and third in class. Despite overwhelming numbers, all the Porsches in GT2 had serious mechanical delays or retired with only 5 of the 12 finishing. Franz Konrad’s second car only lasted two laps due to piston failure, while the unluckiest was the new Portuguese Estoril Racing team, whose engine broke with only ten minutes to go.

The race-win was a fitting memorial to Ferry Porsche, former manager of the company, who had died three months earlier. The average age of the three winners was only 28.3 years – the youngest ever to date. By the end of 1998, Porsche had produced 21 roadworthy models of the 911 GT1 (sold for around DM1.55 million). The JB-Giesse Ferrari won the International Sports Racing Series with Collard and Sospiri getting the Drivers' Championship after winning 6 of the 8 rounds. Back in the USA, the other Doyle-Risi Ferrari won the inaugural Petit Le Mans. Mercedes-Benz regrouped and went on to win all 8 of the remaining races in the GT1 Championship, with Ludwig and Zonta crowned as Drivers' Champions. The ORECA team and Olivier Beretta cleaned up the GT2 Championship. Finally, October saw the passing of Olivier Gendebien, one of the legends of Le Mans. One of only four drivers, alongside Woolf Barnato, Henri Pescarolo and Jacky Ickx, to have won three Le Mans in a row.

== Official results ==
=== Finishers ===
Results taken from Quentin Spurring's book, officially licensed by the ACO
Class Winners are in Bold text.

Pos	Class	No.	Team	Drivers	Chassis	Engine	Tyre	Laps
1	**LM-GT1**	**26**	**(Germany) Porsche AG**	**(United Kingdom) Allan McNish** **(Monaco) Stéphane Ortelli** **(France) Laurent Aïello**	Porsche 911 GT1-98	Porsche 9R1 3.2L F6 twin turbo	M	351
2	LM-GT1	25	(Germany) Porsche AG	(France) Bob Wollek (Germany) Jörg Müller (Germany) Uwe Alzen	Porsche 911 GT1-98	Porsche 9R1 3.2L F6 twin turbo	M	350
3	LM-GT1	32	(Japan) NISMO	(Japan) Aguri Suzuki (Japan) Kazuyoshi Hoshino (Japan) Masahiko Kageyama	Nissan R390 GT1	Nissan VRH35L 3.5L V8 twin turbo	B	347
4	LM-GT1 *	40	(United Kingdom) GTC/Gulf Team Davidoff	(United Kingdom) Tim Sugden (United States) Bill Auberlen (United Kingdom) Steve O'Rourke	McLaren F1 GTR 97	BMW S70/3 6.1L V12	P	343
5	LM-GT1	30	(Japan) NISMO	(Denmark) John Nielsen (Germany) Michael Krumm (France) Franck Lagorce	Nissan R390 GT1	Nissan VRH35L 3.5L V8 twin turbo	B	342
6	LM-GT1	31	(Japan) NISMO	(Netherlands) Jan Lammers (France) Érik Comas (Italy) Andrea Montermini	Nissan R390 GT1	Nissan VRH35L 3.5L V8 twin turbo	B	342
7	LM-GT1	45	(United States) Panoz Motorsports	(Australia) David Brabham (United Kingdom) Andy Wallace (United Kingdom) Jamie Davies	Panoz Esperante GTR-1	Roush-Ford 6.0L V8	M	335
8	**LM-P1**	**12**	**(United States) Doyle-Risi Racing**	**(Belgium) Eric van de Poele** **(South Africa) Wayne Taylor** **(Spain) Fermín Velez**	Ferrari 333 SP	Ferrari F310E 4.0L V12	P	332
9	LM-GT1	27	(Japan) Toyota Motorsport GmbH	(Japan) Toshio Suzuki (Japan) Ukyo Katayama (Japan) Keiichi Tsuchiya	Toyota GT-One	Toyota R36V 3.6L V8 twin turbo	M	326
10	LM-GT1	33	(Japan) NISMO	(Japan) Satoshi Motoyama (Japan) Takuya Kurosawa (Japan) Masami Kageyama	Nissan R390 GT1	Nissan VRH35L 3.5L V8 twin turbo	B	319
11	**LM-GT2**	**53**	**(France) Viper Team ORECA**	**(United Kingdom) Justin Bell** **(United States) David Donohue** **(Italy) Luca Drudi**	Chrysler Viper GTS-R	Chrysler 356-T6 8.0L V10	M	317
12	LM-P1	16	(Germany) Kremer Racing	(Italy) Riccardo “Rocky” Agusta (Italy) Almo Coppelli (France) Xavier Pompidou	Kremer K8/2	Porsche 935/76 3.0L F6 twin turbo	G	314
13	LM-GT2	51	(France) Viper Team ORECA	(Monaco) Olivier Beretta (Portugal) Pedro Lamy (United States) Tommy Archer	Chrysler Viper GTS-R	Chrysler 356-T6 8.0L V10	M	312
14	LM-P1	3	(Italy) Momo Racing	(Italy) Gianpiero Moretti (Italy) Mauro Baldi (Belgium) Didier Theys	Ferrari 333 SP	Ferrari F310E 4.0L V12	Y	311
15	LM-P1 *	24	(France) Courage Compétition (Japan) Team AM-PM (private entrant)	(Japan) Yojiro Terada (France) Franck Fréon (France) Olivier Thévenin	Courage C50	Porsche 935/76 3.0L F6 twin turbo	M	304
16	LM-P1	15	(France) La Filière Elf (France) Courage Compétition	(France) Henri Pescarolo (France) Olivier Grouillard (France) Franck Montagny	Courage C36	Porsche 935/76 3.0L F6 twin turbo	M	300
17	LM-GT2	64	(Germany) Roock Racing Team	(France) Michel Ligonnet (Germany) Claudia Hürtgen (United Kingdom) Robert Nearn	Porsche 911 GT2	Porsche M64/81 3.6L F6 twin turbo	Y	285
18	LM-GT2	69	(France) M. Nourry (private entrant)	(France) Michel Nourry (France) Thierry Perrier (France) Jean-Louis Ricci	Porsche 911 GT2	Porsche M64/81 3.6L F6 twin turbo	G	276
19	LM-GT2	56	(United Kingdom) Chamberlain Engineering	(United Kingdom) Gary Ayles (United States) Matt Turner (Netherlands) Hans Hugenholtz Jr	Chrysler Viper GTS-R	Chrysler 356-T6 8.0L V10	D	270
20	LM-GT2 *	68	(Switzerland) Elf Haberthur Racing (private entrant)	(France) Hervé Poulain (France) Éric Graham (France) Jean-Luc Maury-Laribière	Porsche 911 GT2	Porsche M64/81 3.6L F6 twin turbo	D	268
21	LM-GT2	55	(United Kingdom) Chamberlain Engineering	(Portugal) Ni Amorim (Portugal) Gonçalo Gomes (Portugal) Manuel Mello-Breyner	Chrysler Viper GTS-R	Chrysler 356-T6 8.0L V10	D	264
22	LM-GT2	65 reserve	(Germany) Roock Racing Team	(United Kingdom) Rob Schirle (France) André Ahrlé (United Kingdom) David Warnock	Porsche 911 GT2	Porsche M64/81 3.6L F6 twin turbo	Y	247
23	LM-GT2	72	(France) Larbre Compétition	(France) Patrice Goueslard (France) Jean-Luc Chéreau (France) Pierre Yver	Porsche 911 GT2	Porsche M64/82 3.6L F6 twin turbo	M	240

=== Did not finish ===
Pos	Class	No	Team	Drivers	Chassis	Engine	Tyre	Laps	Reason
DNF	LM-GT1	29	(Japan) Toyota Motorsport GmbH	(United Kingdom) Geoff Lees (Belgium) Thierry Boutsen (Germany) Ralf Kelleners	Toyota GT-One	Toyota R36V 3.6L V8 twin turbo	M	330	Gearbox (23hr)
DNF	LM-GT2	71	(Portugal) Estoril Racing (private entrant)	(France) Michel Maisonneuve (France) Manuel Monteiro (France) Michel Monteiro	Porsche 911 GT2	Porsche M64/81 3.6L F6 twin turbo	P	277	Engine (24hr)
DNF	LM-GT1	44	(France) DAMS (United States) Panoz Motorsports	(France) Éric Bernard (France) Christophe Tinseau (United States) Johnny O'Connell	Panoz Esperante GTR-1	Roush-Ford 6.0L V8	M	236	Gearbox (21hr)
DNF	LM-P1	13	(France) Courage Compétition	(France) Didier Cottaz (Belgium) Marc Goossens (France) Jean-Philippe Belloc	Courage C51	Nissan VRH30L 3.0L V8 twin turbo	M	232	Gearbox (18hr)
DNF	LM-GT1 *	41	(United Kingdom) GTC/Gulf Team Davidoff	(Germany) Dr Thomas Bscher (Italy) Emanuele Pirro (Italy) Rinaldo Capello	McLaren F1 GTR 97	BMW S70/3 6.1L V12	G	228	Accident (17hr)
DNF	LM-P1	8	(Germany) Porsche AG (Germany) Joest Racing	(United Kingdom) James Weaver (France) Pierre-Henri Raphanel (United States) David Murry	Porsche LMP1-98	Porsche 935/76 3.2L F6 twin turbo	G	218	Accident (16hr)
DNF	LM-P1	10	(France) Ferté Pilot Racing (private entrant)	(France) Michel Ferté (France) Pascal Fabre (France) François Migault	Ferrari 333 SP	Ferrari F310E 4.0L V12	D	203	Gearbox (17hr)
DNF	LM-GT2	67	(Switzerland) Elf Haberthur Racing (private entrant)	(France) Jean-Claude Lagniez (Belgium) Michel Neugarten (France) David Smadja	Porsche 911 GT2	Porsche M64/82 3.6L F6 twin turbo	D	198	Transmission (17hr)
DNF	LM-GT1	28	(Japan) Toyota Motorsport GmbH	(United Kingdom) Martin Brundle (France) Emmanuel Collard (France) Éric Hélary	Toyota GT-One	Toyota R36V 3.6L V8 twin turbo	M	191	Accident (15hr)
DNF	LM-P1	5	(France) JB Racing (private entrant)	(France) Jean-Christophe Boullion (France) Jérôme Policand (Italy) Vincenzo Sospiri	Ferrari 333 SP-98	Ferrari F310E 4.0L V12	M	187	Gearbox (14hr)
DNF	LM-GT2	60	(France) Chéreau Sports (France) Larbre Compétition	(France) Jean-Pierre Jarier (Sweden) Carl Rosenblad (United Kingdom) Robin Donovan	Porsche 911 GT2	Porsche M64/81 3.6L F6 twin turbo	M	164	Suspension (15hr)
DNF	LM-GT2	62	(Canada) CJ Motorsports (private entrant)	(United States) John Morton (Germany) Harald Grohs (Canada) John Graham	Porsche 911 GT2	Porsche M64/82 3.6L F6 twin turbo	G	164	Accident (15hr)
DNF	LM-P1	21	(France) Solution F / P. Gache (private entrant)	(France) Philippe Gache (Australia) Wayne Gardner (Belgium) Didier de Radiguès	Riley & Scott Mk III	Ford 5.1L V8	P	155	Engine (13hr)
DNF	LM-P1	14	(France) Courage Compétition	(Sweden) Fredrik Ekblom (France) Patrice Gay (Japan) Takeshi Tsuchiya	Courage C51	Nissan VRH30L 3.0L V8 twin turbo	M	126	Engine (10hr)
DNF	LM-P1 *	7	(Germany) Porsche AG (Germany) Joest Racing	(Italy) Michele Alboreto (Sweden) Stefan Johansson (France) Yannick Dalmas	Porsche LMP1-98	Porsche 935/76 3.2L F6 twin turbo	G	107	Electrics (8hr)
DNF	LM-P2	22	(France) Didier Bonnet (private entrant)	(France) Lionel Robert (France) Édouard Sezionale (France) Pierre Bruneau	Debora LMP296	BMW S50 3.2L S6	M	106	Gearbox (11hr)
DNF	LM-GT2	61	(Germany) Krauss Race Sports (private entrant)	(Germany) Bernhard Müller (Germany) Michael Trunk (Germany) Ernst Palmberger	Porsche 911 GT2	Porsche M64/81 3.6L F6 twin turbo	D	71	Engine (9hr)
DNF	LM-P1	1	(Germany) Team BMW Motorsport	(Germany) Hans-Joachim Stuck (Denmark) Tom Kristensen (United Kingdom) Steve Soper	BMW V12 LM	BMW S70/3 6.0L V12	M	60	Suspension (5hr)
DNF	LM-P1	2	(Germany) Team BMW Motorsport	(Italy) Pierluigi Martini (Germany) Joachim Winkelhock (Venezuela) Johnny Cecotto	BMW V12 LM	BMW S70/3 6.0L V12	M	43	Suspension (5hr)
DNF	LM-GT1 *	36	(Germany) AMG Mercedes	(France) Jean-Marc Gounon (France) Christophe Bouchut (Brazil) Ricardo Zonta	Mercedes-Benz CLK GTR	Mercedes-Benz M119; E 60 6.0L V8	B	31	Engine (3hr)
DNF	LM-GT2	50	(France) Viper Team ORECA	(Austria) Karl Wendlinger (Belgium) Marc Duez (Netherlands) Patrick Huisman	Chrysler Viper GTS-R	Chrysler 356-T6 8.0L V10	M	28	Electrics (4hr)
DNF	LM-GT2	70	(Germany) Konrad Motorsport	(Austria) Franz Konrad (United States) Larry Schumacher (United States) Nick Ham	Porsche 911 GT2	Porsche M64/81 3.6L F6 twin turbo	D	24	Accident (5hr)
DNF	LM-GT1	35	(Germany) AMG Mercedes	(Germany) Bernd Schneider (Australia) Mark Webber (Germany) Klaus Ludwig	Mercedes-Benz CLK GTR	Mercedes-Benz M119; E 60 6.0L V8	B	19	Engine (2hr)
DNF	LM-GT2	73	(Germany) Konrad Motorsport	(Switzerland) Toni Seiler (United States) Peter Kitchak (Italy) Angelo Zadra	Porsche 911 GT2	Porsche M64/81 3.6L F6 twin turbo	D	2	Engine (2hr)

=== Did not start ===
Pos	Class	No	Team	Drivers	Chassis	Engine	Tyre	Reason
DNA	LM-GT1	37	(United Kingdom) Newcastle United Lister Cars	(United Kingdom) Julian Bailey (United Kingdom) Tiff Needell (United Kingdom) Anthony Reid	Lister Storm GTL	Jaguar HE 7.0L V12	**M**	Failed Scrutineering
DNA	LM-GT1	46	(United States) Panoz Motorsports	(United Kingdom) James Weaver (United Kingdom) Perry McCarthy	Panoz Esperante GTR-1	Roush-Ford 6.0L V8	**M**	Entry Withdrawn
DNA	LM-GT2	52	(France) Viper Team ORECA	(Monaco) Olivier Beretta (Austria) Karl Wendlinger (Italy) Luca Drudi	Chrysler Viper GTS-R	Chrysler 356-T6 8.0L V10	**M**	Entry Withdrawn
DNA	LM-GT2	54	(United Kingdom) Orion Motorsport (private entrant)	(United Kingdom) Richard Dean (United Kingdom) Julian Westwood (Netherlands) Michael Vergers (United Kingdom) Kurt Luby	Chrysler Viper GTS-R	Chrysler 356-T6 8.0L V10		Failed Scrutineering
DNA	LM-GT2	58 reserve	(United Kingdom) R.J. Racing (private entrant)	(France) Benjamin Roy (France) Patrick Gonin	Helem V6	Renault PRV 3.0L V6 twin turbo	**P**	Failed Scrutineering
DNA	LM-GT2	74	(United Kingdom) Cirtek Motorsport (private entrant)	(United Kingdom) Robert Schirle (France) Michel Ligonnet (United Kingdom) David Warnock	Saleen Mustang RRR	Ford 5.9L V8	**D**	Entry Withdrawn

- Note *: one of the six “Automatic Entries” awarded by the ACO.

=== Class winners ===
Class	Winning Car	Winning Drivers
LM-P1	#12 Ferrari 333 SP	van der Poele / Velez / Taylor
LM-P2	no finishers	
LM-GT1	#26 Porsche 911 GT1-98	McNish / Ortelli / Aiello
LM-GT2	#53 Chrysler Viper GTS-R	Bell / Donohue / Drudi

== Statistics ==
Taken from Quentin Spurring's book, officially licensed by the ACO

- Pole Position – B. Schneider, #35 Mercedes-Benz CLK-GTR - 3:35.5; 227.2 km/h (141.2 mph)
- Fastest Lap – M. Brundle, #28 Toyota GT-One – 3:41.8; 220.8 km/h (137.2 mph)
- Winning Distance – 4,783.8 km (2,972.5 mi)
- Winner's Average Speed – 199.3 km/h (123.8 mph)
- Attendance - 185000
