= Michel Nourry =

French racing driver

Michel Jacques Albert Nourry (born 11 January 1946) is a former French racing driver. His team finished 18th in the 1998 24 Hours of Le Mans.
