= Lorenzo Ferrari (racing driver) =

Italian racing driver (born 2002)

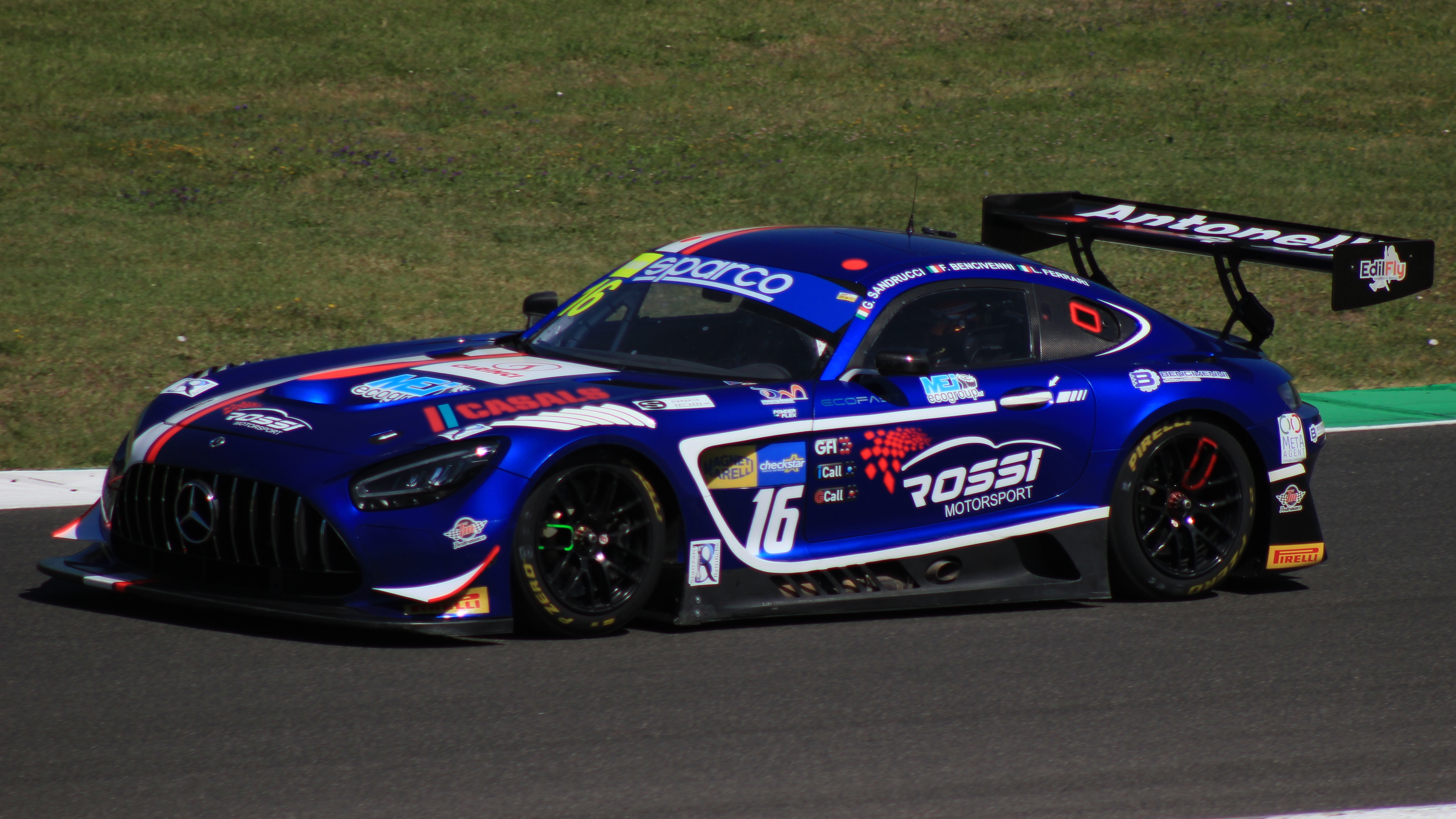
- Nationality: (Italy) Italian
- Born: 22 October 2002 (age 24) Fiorenzuola d'Arda, Italy

European Le Mans Series career
- Debut season: 2022
- Current team: Proton Competition
- Categorisation: FIA Silver (until 2022); FIA Gold (2023–)
- Car number: 77
- Co-driver: Gianmaria Bruni, Christian Ried
- Starts: 6 (6 entries)
- Wins: 1
- Podiums: 3
- Poles: 0
- Fastest laps: 0
- Best finish: 1st (LMGTE) in 2022

Previous series
- 2021 2020-2021 2019 2019: International GT Open; Italian GT Championship; Euroformula Open Championship; Italian F4 Championship

Championship titles
- 2022 2021 2021: ELMS - LMGTE; Italian GT - Sprint; Italian GT - Endurance

Lorenzo Ferrari (born 22 October 2002) is an Italian racing driver. He is the champion of the 2022 European Le Mans Series in the LMGTE class with Proton Competition.

== Early career ==
He raced in international and national karting from 2014 to 2018

=== Lower formulae ===
Ferrari began his car racing career in 2019, competing for Antonelli Motorsport in the Italian F4 Championship. With a sole podium coming at Mugello, the Italian finished 17th in the standings.

Near the end of the year, Ferrari made a guest appearance in the Euroformula Open Championship with RP Motorsport.

== Sportscar career ==
=== 2020: Debut in GT3 ===
For the 2020 season, Ferrari switched to GT3 machinery, remaining with the renamed AKM Motorsport outfit for the Italian GT Championship. Aboard a Mercedes-AMG GT3, he ended up fifth in the Sprint standings, having taken a pair of victories.

=== 2021: National glory ===
Ferrari remained in the Italian GT Championship the following year, teaming up with Audi Sport Italia and partnering Riccardo Agostini and Audi factory driver Mattia Drudi. He would claim both the Sprint and Endurance titles, winning four and three times respectively.

=== 2022: ELMS title ===
A step to the international scene came in 2022, where Ferrari switched allegiance to Porsche and raced for Proton Competition in the European Le Mans Series, pairing up with works driver Gianmaria Bruni and team owner Christian Ried. The year began with a podium at Le Castellet, with teammate Bruni losing out on victory by a mere tenth of a second. During the second round in Imola however, contact on the opening lap would force the squad out of the race. This setback would be rectified at Monza, as, with Ried having taken pole position, the team ended up with another second place. At round four, Ferrari would help his team to take their only win of the season, winning in Barcelona to grab the championship lead. A pair of top-five finishes in the remaining two races meant that Ferrari, Bruni and Ried were crowned champions of the LMGTE category.

Ferrari combined his ELMS exploits with a GT World Challenge Europe Endurance Cup programme in Winward Racing's Gold Cup effort, sharing a Mercedes-AMG GT3 Evo with Lucas Auer and gentleman driver Jens Liebhauser. Despite getting class pole at the season opener in Imola, the trio struggled to find success and finished tenth in the Gold Cup standings with 31 points. They had achieved their first win at the Barcelona round, but a post-race penalty for Auer spinning Arjun Maini round on the final lap demoted them to sixth place. Ferrari's performances in the 2022 season earned him an upgrade to gold status in the FIA's driver categorisation for 2023.

== Racing record ==
=== Racing career summary ===
Season	Series	Team	Races	Wins	Poles	F/Laps	Podiums	Points	Position
2019	Italian F4 Championship	Antonelli Motorsport	16	0	0	0	1	25	17th
2019	Euroformula Open Championship	RP Motorsport	2	0	0	0	0	0	NC†
2020	Italian GT Endurance Championship - GT3	AKM Motorsport	3	0	0	0	0	7	16th
2020	Italian GT Sprint Championship - GT3	AKM Motorsport	8	2	0	0	2	61	5th
2021	Italian GT Sprint Championship - GT3	Audi Sport Italia	8	4	1	0	5	69	**1st**
2021	Italian GT Endurance Championship - GT3	Audi Sport Italia	4	3	1	0	3	60	**1st**
2021	International GT Open	Audi Sport Italia	2	0	0	0	0	10	14th
2022	European Le Mans Series - LMGTE	Proton Competition	6	1	0	0	3	82	**1st**
2022	GT World Challenge Europe Endurance Cup	Winward Racing	5	0	0	0	0	0	NC
2022	GT World Challenge Europe Endurance Cup - Gold	Winward Racing	5	0	0	0	0	31	10th
2022	ADAC GT Masters	Mann-Filter Team Landgraf	2	0	0	0	0	2	35th
2023	GT World Challenge Europe Endurance Cup	AKKodis ASP Team	5	0	0	0	0	6	22nd
2023	Porsche Carrera Cup Germany	Proton Competition	2	0	0	0	0	4	26th
2023	Porsche Carrera Cup Italy	Raptor Engineering	5	0	0	0	0	32	17th
2023	Italian GT Sprint Championship - GT3 Pro	AKM Motorsport							
2023	Intercontinental GT Challenge	Mercedes-AMG Team GruppeM Racing	1	0	0	0	0	12	23rd
2024	GT World Challenge Europe Endurance Cup	Tresor Attempto Racing	5	0	0	0	0	0	NC
2024	GT World Challenge Europe Sprint Cup	Tresor Attempto Racing	10	0	0	0	0	16	12th
2024	GT World Challenge Europe Sprint Cup - Gold Cup	Tresor Attempto Racing	6	4	0	1	5	75.5	4th
2024	Italian GT Endurance Championship - GT3 Pro-Am	AKM Motorsport	3	1	1	1	1	42	7th
2025	Italian GT Championship Endurance Cup - GT3	AF Corse	4	0	0	1	1	50	4th
2025	Italian GT Championship Sprint Cup - GT3	AF Corse	8	1	3	1	1	48	9th
2026	Italian GT Championship Endurance Cup - GT3	AKM Motorsport	4	1	2	0	2	56	**3rd**
2026	Italian GT Championship Sprint Cup - GT3	Double TT Racing	6	0	0	0	0	11	16th
2026	Le Mans Cup - GT3	Kessel Racing	2	1	1	0	1	38	10th
2026	GT World Challenge Europe Endurance Cup	Tresor Attempto Racing	1	0	0	0	0	0	NC†
2026	GT World Challenge Europe Endurance Cup	AF Corse	1	0	0	0	0	0	NC†
2026	International GT Open	AF Corse	7	0	0	0	0	21	17th

^{†} As Ferrari was a guest driver, he was ineligible to score points.
^{*} Season still in progress.

=== Complete Italian F4 Championship results ===
(key) (Races in bold indicate pole position) (Races in italics indicate fastest lap)

Year	Team	1	2	3	4	5	6	7	8	9	10	11	12	13	14	15	16	17	18	19	20	21	22	Pos	Points
2019	Antonelli Motorsport	VLL; 1; 14	VLL; 2; 9	VLL; 3; 10	MIS; 1; 29	MIS; 2; 15	MIS; 3 C	HUN; 1 Ret	HUN; 2 DNS	HUN; 3 DNS	RBR; 1	RBR; 2	RBR; 3	IMO; 1; 17	IMO; 2; 14	IMO; 3; 9	IMO; 4; 23	MUG; 1; 2	MUG; 2; 13	MUG; 3; 9	MNZ; 1; 13	MNZ; 2; 11	MNZ; 3 Ret	17th	25

=== Complete Euroformula Open Championship results ===
(key) (Races in bold indicate pole position) (Races in italics indicate fastest lap)

Year	Team	1	2	3	4	5	6	7	8	9	10	11	12	13	14	15	16	17	18	Pos	Points
2019	RP Motorsport	LEC; 1	LEC; 2	PAU; 1	PAU; 2	HOC; 1	HOC; 2	SPA; 1	SPA; 2	HUN; 1	HUN; 2	RBR; 1	RBR; 2	SIL; 1	SIL; 2	CAT; 1	CAT; 2	MNZ; 1; 15	MNZ; 2; 12	NC	0

=== Complete European Le Mans Series results ===
(key) (Races in bold indicate pole position; results in italics indicate fastest lap)

Year	Entrant	Class	Chassis	Engine	1	2	3	4	5	6	Rank	Points
2022	Proton Competition	LMGTE	Porsche 911 RSR-19	Porsche 4.2 L Flat-6	LEC; 2	IMO; Ret	MNZ; 2	CAT; 1	SPA; 9	ALG; 5	1st	82

=== Complete GT World Challenge Europe results ===
==== GT World Challenge Europe Endurance Cup ====
(Races in bold indicate pole position) (Races in italics indicate fastest lap)

Year	Team	Car	Class	1	2	3	4	5	6	7	Pos.	Points
2022	Winward Racing	Mercedes-AMG GT3 Evo	Gold	**IMO**; Ret	LEC; 35	SPA; 6H; 42	SPA; 12H; 32	SPA; 24H; 40†	HOC; 21	CAT; 33	10th	31
2023	Akkodis ASP Team	Mercedes-AMG GT3 Evo	Pro	MNZ; 13	LEC; 13	SPA; 6H; 15	SPA; 12H; 10	SPA; 24H; Ret	NÜR; Ret	CAT; 7	22nd	6
2024	Tresor Attempto Racing	Audi R8 LMS Evo II	Gold	LEC; 40	SPA; 6H; 48	SPA; 12H; 46	**SPA**; **24H**; 30	NÜR; 23	MNZ; Ret	JED; Ret	7th	43
2026	Tresor Attempto Racing	Audi R8 LMS Evo II	Gold	LEC	**MNZ**; Ret	SPA; 6H	SPA; 12H	SPA; 24H	NÜR		22nd	1
2026	AF Corse	Ferrari 296 GT3 Evo	Pro							ALG; 11	NC‡	0‡

==== GT World Challenge Europe Sprint Cup ====
Year	Team	Car	Class	1	2	3	4	5	6	7	8	9	10	Pos.	Points
2024	Tresor Attempto Racing	Audi R8 LMS Evo II	Pro	BRH; 1; 17	BRH; 2; 16	MIS; 1; 12	MIS; 2; 12							12th	16
2024	Tresor Attempto Racing	Audi R8 LMS Evo II	Gold					HOC; 1; 11	HOC; 2; 7	MAG; 1; 6	MAG; 2; 4	CAT; 1; 19	CAT; 2; 9	4th	75.5

=== Complete Le Mans Cup results ===
(key) (Races in bold indicate pole position) (Races in italics indicate the fastest lap)

Year	Entrant	Class	Chassis	1	2	3	4	5	6	Pos.	Points
2026	Kessel Racing	GT3	Ferrari 296 GT3 Evo	BAR	LEC; 4	LMS	**SPA**; 1	SIL	POR	10th	38

^{*} Season still in progress.
