= Simon Mann (racing driver) =

American racing driver (born 2001)

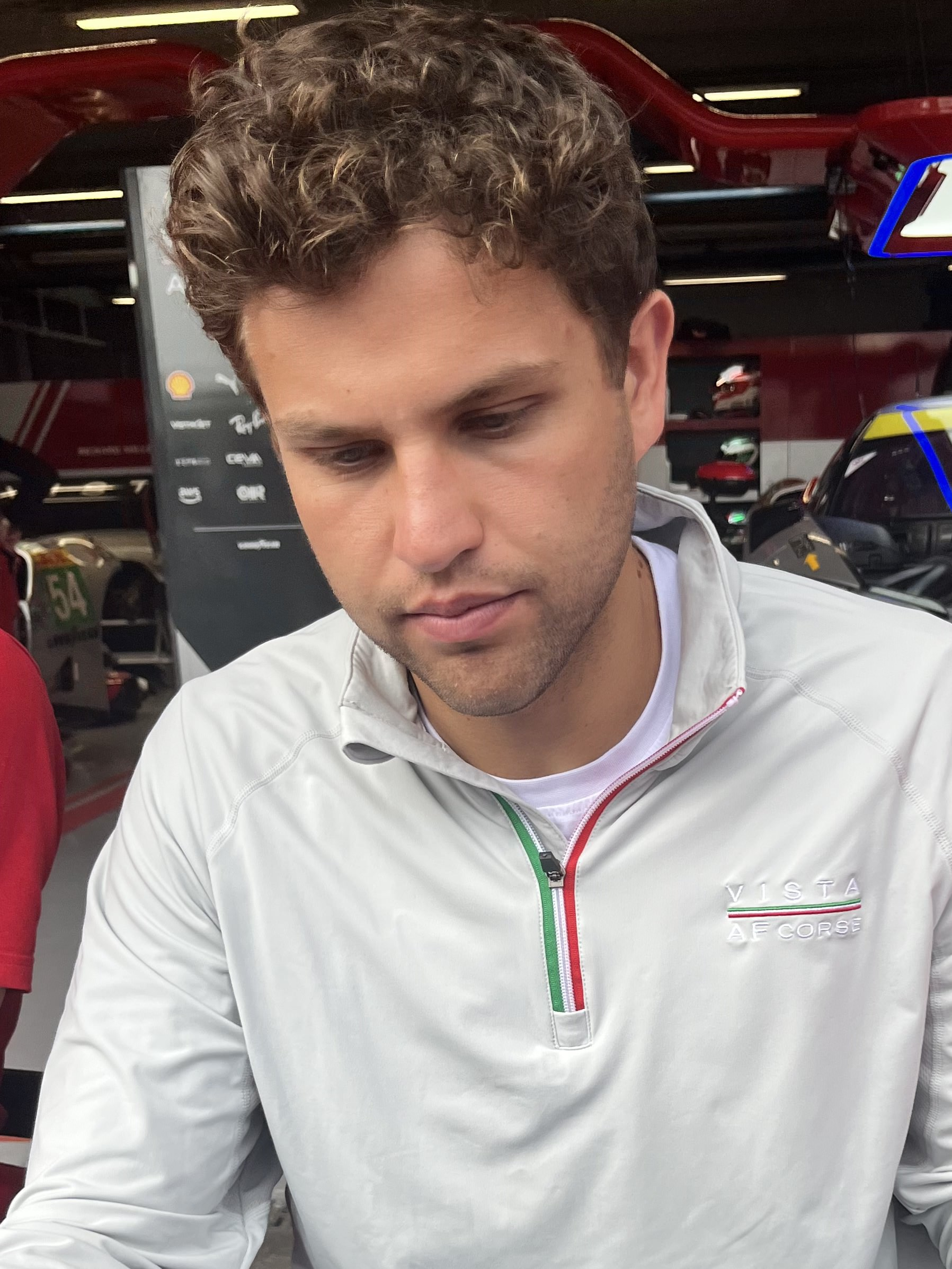
- Mann at the 2025 6 Hours of São Paulo
- Nationality: (United States) American
- Born: 10 February 2001 (age 25) Paris, France
- Relatives: Peter Mann (father); Pierre Louis-Dreyfus (great-grandfather)

FIA World Endurance Championship career
- Debut season: 2021
- Current team: Vista AF Corse
- Categorisation: FIA Silver
- Car number: 55
- Starts: 17 (17 entries)
- Wins: 0
- Podiums: 0
- Poles: 0
- Fastest laps: 0
- Best finish: 12th (LMGTE Am) in 2023

Championship titles
- 2021 2020–21: Italian GT Endurance - Pro-Am; Italian GT Sprint - Pro-Am

Simon Mann (born 10 February 2001) is an American racing driver currently competing in the FIA World Endurance Championship with AF Corse. A mainstay at the Italian team, Mann has tasted success in the Italian GT Championship's Pro-Am class, winning the Sprint title in 2020 and 2021, the same year in which he would triumph in the Endurance championship.

== Personal life ==
Mann is the son of British-born, American-naturalised gentleman driver Peter Mann, and the great-grandson of French soldier Pierre Louis-Dreyfus, who made eleven 24 Hours of Le Mans starts between 1931 and 1955.

== GT3 beginnings ==
Mann started his career in 2018, competing in the GT3 Light class of the Italian GT Championship with AF Corse. The American-licensed driver returned with the team the following year, driving in the Pro-Am classes of both the Sprint and Endurance series. In the Endurance championship, he and Matteo Cressoni finished 12th in class, whereas the Sprint championship yielded four class podiums, including Mann's first car racing win at Vallelunga; Mann ended up third in the Pro-Am standings. In 2020, he once again raced alongside Cressoni in Italian GT. In the Endurance championship, Mann finished fourth in Pro-Am with two class podiums, though he and Cressoni would attain Sprint success, beating the Easy Race on a dead heat to claim the Pro-Am title.

For the 2021 season, Mann returned to the Sprint and Endurance series, continuing his partnership with AF Corse. Having started the year by competing at the 24 Hours of Daytona, Mann soon showed title-winning form in the Pro-Am class, winning his class at Misano and Imola alongside Toni Vilander and Matteo Cressoni respectively. His Sprint campaign concluded with a pair of overall podiums at Mugello, which earned Mann the Sprint Pro-Am title. In Endurance, Mann also won the Pro-Am championship, attaining class wins at Mugello and the season finale in Monza.

== LMGTE career ==
Having made his LMGTE debut at the 6 Hours of Monza in 2021, Mann moved into the FIA World Endurance Championship the subsequent year, pairing up with Vilander and bronze-ranked Christoph Ulrich in AF Corse's LMGTE Am lineup. The outfit performed unremarkably, taking a best finish of seventh and ending up 11th in the teams' standings.

Mann scored a podium in the Asian Le Mans Series at the start of 2023 before embarking on another season in the WEC, this time driving alongside Ulysse de Pauw and a rotating door of amateur drivers in the third seat. Their campaign started off well, as the No. 21 crew took fourth place at Sebring and finished fifth in Portimão. However, an early crash for de Pauw at Le Mans changed their fortunes in the second half of the year, as the team missed out on points thrice during the final four races and took home tenth in the overall championship.

== Racing record ==
=== Racing career summary ===
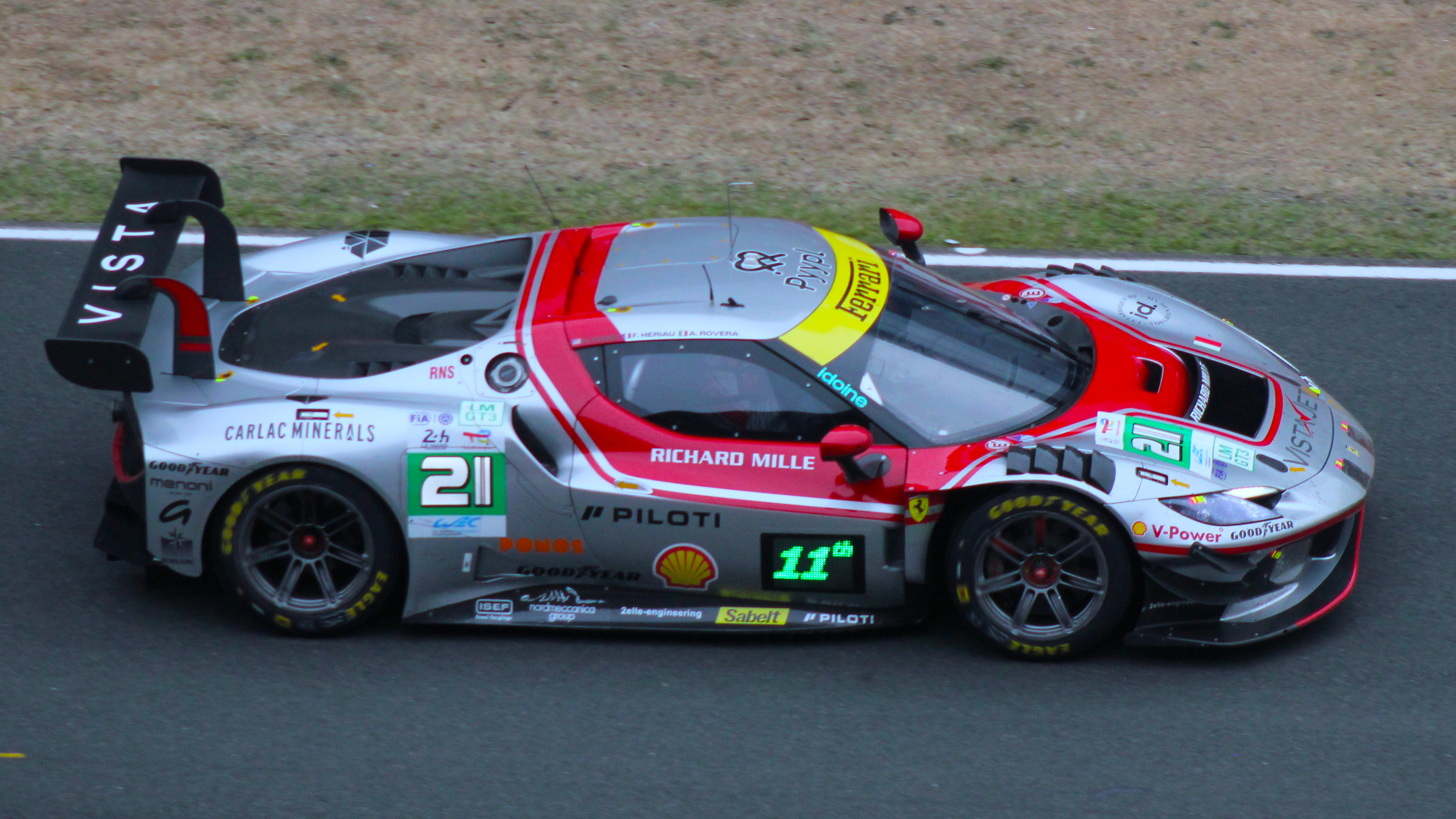
Mann's No. 21 car at the 2025 24 Hours of Le Mans

Season	Series	Team	Races	Wins	Poles	F/Laps	Podiums	Points	Position
2018	Italian GT Championship - GT3 Light	AF Corse	?	?	?	?	?	?	?
2019	Italian GT Championship Sprint - GT3 Pro-Am	AF Corse	6	1	0	1	4	72	**3rd**
2019	Italian GT Championship Endurance - GT3 Pro-Am	AF Corse	4	0	0	0	0	17	12th
2020	Italian GT Championship Sprint - GT3 Pro-Am	AF Corse	8	2	0	0	7	94	**1st**
2020	Italian GT Championship Endurance - GT3 Pro-Am	AF Corse	3	0	0	0	2	27	4th
2021	Italian GT Championship Sprint - GT3 Pro-Am	AF Corse	8	3	0	0	5	94	**1st**
2021	Italian GT Championship Endurance - GT3 Pro-Am	AF Corse	4	2	0	0	2	52	**1st**
2021	FIA World Endurance Championship - LMGTE Am	AF Corse	1	0	0	0	0	0	NC†
2021	IMSA SportsCar Championship - GTD	AF Corse	2	0	0	0	0	246	55th
2022	FIA World Endurance Championship - LMGTE Am	AF Corse	6	0	0	0	0	28	17th
2022	IMSA SportsCar Championship - GTD	AF Corse	4	0	0	0	1	1119	20th
2023	Asian Le Mans Series - GT	AF Corse	4	0	0	0	1	23	7th
2023	FIA World Endurance Championship - LMGTE Am	AF Corse	7	0	0	0	0	38	12th
2023	IMSA SportsCar Championship - GTD Pro	AF Corse	2	0	0	0	0	537	19th
2023	IMSA SportsCar Championship - GTD	AF Corse	2	0	0	0	0	337	47th
2023	GT World Challenge Europe Endurance Cup	AF Corse	1	0	0	0	0	0	NC
2023	24 Hours of Le Mans - LMGTE Am	AF Corse	1	0	0	0	0	N/A	DNF
2023-24	Asian Le Mans Series - GT	AF Corse	5	0	0	0	1	32	8th
2024	FIA World Endurance Championship - LMGT3	Vista AF Corse	8	1	0	0	1	97	**3rd**
2024	IMSA SportsCar Championship - GTD	AF Corse	5	0	0	0	1	1154	30th
2025	FIA World Endurance Championship - LMGT3	Vista AF Corse	8	1	0	1	2	109	**2nd**
2025	IMSA SportsCar Championship - GTD	AF Corse	5	1	1	1	1	163	24th
2025	Italian GT Championship Endurance Cup - GT3	AF Corse	3	0	0	0	0	4	20th
2025–26	Asian Le Mans Series - GT	AF Corse	6	0	0	1	1	43	9th
2026	IMSA SportsCar Championship - GTD	AF Corse USA	5	1	1	2	1	1318	22nd
2026	FIA World Endurance Championship - LMGT3	Vista AF Corse							

^{†} As Mann was a guest driver, he was ineligible to score points.^{*} Season still in progress.

=== Complete FIA World Endurance Championship results ===
(key) (Races in bold indicate pole position) (Races in italics indicate fastest lap)

Year	Entrant	Class	Car	Engine	1	2	3	4	5	6	7	8	Rank	Points
2021	AF Corse	LMGTE Am	Ferrari 488 GTE Evo	Ferrari F154CB 3.9 L Turbo V8	SPA	ALG	MNZ; 10	LMS	BHR	BHR			NC‡	0
2022	AF Corse	LMGTE Am	Ferrari 488 GTE Evo	Ferrari F154CB 3.9 L Turbo V8	SEB; 7	SPA; 11	LMS; 7	MNZ; 7	FUJ; 10	BHR; 11			17th	28
2023	AF Corse	LMGTE Am	Ferrari 488 GTE Evo	Ferrari F154CB 3.9 L Turbo V8	SEB; 4	PRT; 5	SPA; 6	LMS; Ret	MNZ; 9	FUJ; 12	BHR; 11		12th	38
2024	Vista AF Corse	LMGT3	Ferrari 296 GT3	Ferrari F163CE 3.0 L Turbo V6	QAT; 7	IMO; 4	SPA; 13	LMS; 5	SÃO; 6	COA; 10	**FUJ**; 6	BHR; 1	3rd	97
2025	Vista AF Corse	LMGT3	Ferrari 296 GT3	Ferrari F163CE 3.0 L Turbo V6	QAT; 5	IMO; Ret	SPA; 1	LMS; 2	SÃO; 13	COA; 12	FUJ; 2	BHR; 5	2nd	109
2026	Vista AF Corse	LMGT3	Ferrari 296 GT3 Evo	Ferrari F163CE 3.0 L Turbo V6	IMO; 6	SPA; 4	LMS; 5	SÃO; 9	COA	FUJ	CAT	MNZ	7th*	42*

^{*} Season still in progress. ‡ As Mann was a guest driver, he was ineligible for points.

=== Complete IMSA SportsCar Championship results ===
(key) (Races in bold indicate pole position; races in italics indicate fastest lap)

Year	Entrant	Class	Make	Engine	1	2	3	4	5	6	7	8	9	10	11	12	Rank	Points
2021	AF Corse	GTD	Ferrari 488 GT3 Evo 2020	Ferrari F154CB 3.9 L Turbo V8	DAY; 8	SEB	MDO	DET	WGL	WGL	LIM	ELK	LGA	LBH	VIR	PET	55th	246
2022	AF Corse	GTD	Ferrari 488 GT3 Evo 2020	Ferrari F154CB 3.9 L Turbo V8	DAY; 4	SEB; 3	LBH	LGA	MDO	DET	WGL; 8	MOS	LIM	ELK	VIR	PET; 8	20th	1119
2023	AF Corse	GTD	Ferrari 296 GT3	Ferrari F163CE 3.0 L Turbo V6	DAY; 19	SEB; 13	LBH	LGA									47th	337
2023	AF Corse	GTD Pro	Ferrari 296 GT3	Ferrari F163CE 3.0 L Turbo V6					WGL; 8	MOS	LIM	ELK	VIR	IMS	PET; 5		19th	537
2024	AF Corse	GTD	Ferrari 296 GT3	Ferrari F163CE 3.0 L Turbo V6	DAY; 2	SEB; 19	LBH	LGA	WGL; 6	MOS	ELK	VIR	IMS; 20	PET; 6			30th	1154
2025	AF Corse	GTD	Ferrari 296 GT3	Ferrari F163CE 3.0 L Turbo V6	DAY; 16	**SEB**; 16	LBH	LGA	WGL; 5	MOS	ELK	VIR	IMS; 18	PET; 1			24th	1163
2026	AF Corse USA	GTD	Ferrari 296 GT3 Evo	Ferrari F163CE 3.0 L Turbo V6	DAY; 5	SEB; 1	LBH	LGA	WGL; 17	MOS	**ELK**; 11	VIR	IMS	PET; 6			22nd	1318

=== Complete 24 Hours of Le Mans results ===
Year	Team	Co-Drivers	Car	Class	Laps	Pos.	Class Pos.
2022	(Italy) AF Corse	(Switzerland) Christoph Ulrich (Finland) Toni Vilander	Ferrari 488 GTE Evo	LMGTE Am	339	41st	8th
2023	(Italy) AF Corse	(Belgium) Ulysse de Pauw (France) Julien Piguet	Ferrari 488 GTE Evo	LMGTE Am	21	DNF	DNF
2024	(Italy) Vista AF Corse	(France) François Hériau (Italy) Alessio Rovera	Ferrari 296 GT3	LMGT3	279	33rd	6th
2025	(Italy) Vista AF Corse	(France) François Hériau (Italy) Alessio Rovera	Ferrari 296 GT3	LMGT3	341	34th	**2nd**
2026	(Italy) Vista AF Corse	(France) François Hériau (Italy) Alessio Rovera	Ferrari 296 GT3 Evo	LMGT3	335	37th	5th

=== Complete Asian Le Mans Series results ===
(key) (Races in bold indicate pole position) (Races in italics indicate fastest lap)

Year	Team	Class	Car	Engine	1	2	3	4	5	6	Pos.	Points
2023	AF Corse	GT	Ferrari 488 GT3 Evo 2020	Ferrari F154CB 3.9 L Turbo V8	DUB; 1; 9	DUB; 2; 3	ABU; 1 Ret	ABU; 2; 7			7th	23
2023–24	AF Corse	GT	Ferrari 296 GT3	Ferrari F163CE 3.0 L Turbo V6	SEP; 1; 10	SEP; 2 Ret	DUB; 3	ABU; 1; 7	ABU; 2; 5		8th	32
2025–26	AF Corse	GT	Ferrari 296 GT3	Ferrari F163CE 3.0 L Turbo V6	SEP; 1 Ret	SEP; 2; 7	DUB; 1; 3	DUB; 2; 17	ABU; 1; 6	ABU; 2; 4	9th	43
