= 2025 Italian GT Championship =

Italian Motorsports Championship

The 2025 Italian GT Championship was the 34th season of the Italian GT Championship, the grand tourer-style sports car racing founded by the Italian Automobile Club (Automobile Club d'Italia). The season started on the 2nd of May at Misano and concluded on the 26th of October at Monza.

== Calendar ==
Map of circuit locations

Round	Circuit	Date	Series
1	Misano World Circuit Marco Simoncelli, Misano Adriatico, Emilia-Romagna	2–4 May	Endurance
2	ACI Vallelunga Circuit, Campagnano di Roma, Rome	23–25 May	Sprint
3	Autodromo Nazionale Monza, Monza, Lombardy	20–22 June	Endurance
4	Autodromo Internazionale del Mugello, Mugello, Tuscany	11–13 July	Sprint
5	Autodromo Internazionale Enzo e Dino Ferrari, Imola, Emilia-Romagna	1–3 August	Endurance
6	Autodromo Internazionale del Mugello, Mugello, Tuscany	12–14 September	Endurance
7	Autodromo Internazionale Enzo e Dino Ferrari, Imola, Emilia-Romagna	26–28 September	Sprint
8	Autodromo Nazionale Monza, Monza, Lombardy	24–26 October	Sprint

== Race Results ==
Rnd.		Circuit	Date	GT3			GT Cup			
Rnd.		Circuit	Date	Overall winners	Pro-Am winners	Am winners	1st Division Pro-Am winners	1st Division Am winners	2nd Division Pro-Am winners	2nd Division Am winners
1		(Emilia-Romagna) Misano	4 May	(Germany) N. 99 Tresor Attempto Racing	(Antigua and Barbuda) N. 26 Haas RT	(Italy) N. 83 AF Corse	(Italy) N. 169 AF Corse	(Italy) N. 273 DL Racing	(Italy) N. 411 SP Racing Team	(Italy) N. 545 ZRS Motorsport
1		(Emilia-Romagna) Misano	4 May	(Italy) Rocco Mazzola (Germany) Fabio Rauer (Italy) Riccardo Cazzaniga	(United Kingdom) Omar Jackson (United Arab Emirates) Ramez Azzam (Zimbabwe) Axcil Jefferies	(United Kingdom) Jason Ambrose (United Kingdom) David McDonald (Italy) Francesco Castellacci	(Italy) Stefano Gai (Italy) Fabrizio Fontana	(Italy) Diego Locanto (Italy) Luca Segù	(Italy) Vicky Piria (Argentina) Matias Russo	(Italy) Paolo Prestipino (Italy) Luciano Micale (Italy) Steven Giacon
2	R1	(Rome) Vallelunga	24/25 May	(Italy) N. 1 BMW Italia Ceccato Racing	(Italy) N. 2 BMW Italia Ceccato Racing	(Italy) N. 77 Nova Race Events	(Italy) N. 109 Target Racing	(Italy) N. 288 HC Racing Division	(Italy) N. 469 Raptor Engineering	(Italy) N. 545 ZRS Motorsport
2	R1	(Rome) Vallelunga	24/25 May	(Germany) Jens Klingmann (Finland) Jesse Krohn	(Finland) William Alatalo (Italy) Leonardo Caglioni	(Italy) Luca Magnoni (Italy) Paolo Rocca	(Italy) Andrea Fontana (Italy) Alessandro Mainetti	(Italy) Piergiacomo Randazzo (Italy) Gaetano Oliva	(Italy) Giacomo Barri (Italy) Flavio Olivieri	(Italy) Steven Giacon (Italy) Carlo Contessi
2	R2	(Rome) Vallelunga	24/25 May	(Italy) N. 51 AF Corse	(Italy) N. 51 AF Corse	(Italy) N. 88 Tresor Attempto Racing	(Italy) N. 166 HC Racing Division	(Italy) N. 244 DL Racing	(Italy) N. 433 Racevent	(Italy) N. 533 SR&R
2	R2	(Rome) Vallelunga	24/25 May	(Italy) Lorenzo Ferrari (India) Mahaveer Raghunathan	(Italy) Lorenzo Ferrari (India) Mahaveer Raghunathan	(Italy) Alberto Clementi Pisani (Italy) Marco Cassarà	(Italy) Ferdinando D'Auria	(Italy) Pierluigi Alessandri	(Italy) Diego Stifter (Italy) Matteo Martinelli	(Republic of Ireland) Lyle Schofield
3		(Lombardy) Monza	22 June	(Italy) N. 63 VSR	(Italy) N. 62 AF Corse	(Thailand) N. 33 Star Performance	(Italy) N. 111 Best Lap	(Italy) N. 273 DL Racing	(Italy) N. 403 Easy Race	(Italy) N. 552 Reparto Corse RAM
3		(Lombardy) Monza	22 June	(Italy) Michele Beretta (Italy) Andrea Frassineti (Portugal) Rodrigo Testa	(Italy) Leonardo Colavita (Egypt) Ibrahim Badawi (Spain) David Vidales	(Serbia) Miloš Pavlović (Germany) Florian Spengler (Thailand) Aniwat Lommahadthai	(Italy) Sabatino Di Mare (Italy) Filippo Croccolino (Italy) Pietro Agoglia	(Italy) Diego Locanto (Italy) Luca Segù	(Italy) Lorenzo Bontempelli (Italy) Diego Di Fabio (Italy) Vito Postiglione	(Italy) Mattia Simonini (Italy) Giacomo Parisotto (Italy) Fabio Daminato
4	R1	(Tuscany) Mugello	12/13 July	(Italy) N. 1 BMW Italia Ceccato Racing	(Italy) N. 2 BMW Italia Ceccato Racing	(Italy) N. 88 Tresor Attempto Racing	(Italy) N. 166 HC Racing Division	(Italy) N. 207 Invictus Corse	(Italy) N. 469 Raptor Engineering	(Italy) N. 545 ZRS Motorsport
4	R1	(Tuscany) Mugello	12/13 July	(Germany) Jens Klingmann (Finland) Jesse Krohn	(Finland) William Alatalo (Italy) Leonardo Caglioni	(Italy) Alberto Clementi Pisani (Italy) Marco Cassarà	(Italy) Ferdinando D'Auria	(Italy) Filippo Lazzaroni (Italy) Angelo Lancelotti	(Italy) Flavio Olivieri	(Italy) Steven Giacon (Italy) Carlo Contessi
4	R2	(Tuscany) Mugello	12/13 July	(Italy) N. 63 VSR	(Italy) N. 66 VSR	(Italy) N. 39 Target Racing	(Italy) N. 106 Giacomo Race	(Italy) N. 212 MRNC12	(Switzerland) N. 492 Centri Porsche Ticino	(Italy) N. 545 ZRS Motorsport
4	R2	(Tuscany) Mugello	12/13 July	(Italy) Andrea Frassineti (Italy) Edoardo Liberati	(Italy) Ignazio Zanon (Italy) Mattia Michelotto	(China) Han Huilin	(Italy) Giacomo Pollini (Italy) Matteo Pollini	(Italy) Giammarco Marzialetti (Italy) Lorenzo Nicoli	(Switzerland) Alex Fontana (Slovenia) Matej Knez	(Italy) Steven Giacon (Italy) Carlo Contessi
5		(Emilia-Romagna) Imola	3 August	(Italy) N. 61 Iron Lynx	(San Marino) N. 64 AKM Motorsport	(Italy) N. 2 BMW Italia Ceccato Racing	(Italy) N. 107 AF Corse	(Italy) N. 272 DL Racing	(Italy) N. 411 SP Racing Team	(Italy) N. 569 Raptor Engineering
5		(Emilia-Romagna) Imola	3 August	(Switzerland) Jean-Luc D'Auria (Netherlands) Lin Hodenius	(Netherlands) Colin Caresani (Thailand) Tanart Sathienthirakul (Germany) Florian Scholze	(United States) Anthony McIntosh (New Zealand) Brendon Leitch	(Denmark) Andreas Bogh-Sorensen (Denmark) Mikkel Mac	(Italy) Alessio Salvaggio (Italy) Giacomo Riva (United Kingdom) Douglas Bolger	(Italy) Vicky Piria (Argentina) Matias Russo	(Italy) Davide Di Benedetto (Italy) Giuseppe Nicolosi (Italy) Gianluca Carboni
6		(Tuscany) Mugello	14 September	(Italy) N. 63 VSR	(Italy) N. 63 VSR	(Italy) N. 83 AF Corse	(Italy) N. 107 AF Corse	(Italy) N. 280 Rossocorsa Racing	(Italy) N. 422 Racevent	(Italy) N. 569 Raptor Engineering
6		(Tuscany) Mugello	14 September	(Italy) Michele Beretta (Italy) Andrea Frassineti (Portugal) Rodrigo Testa	(Italy) Ignazio Zanon (Italy) Mattia Michelotto (Italy) Kevin Gilardoni	(United Kingdom) Jason Ambrose (United Kingdom) David McDonald (Italy) Francesco Castellacci	(Denmark) Andreas Bogh-Sorensen (Denmark) Mikkel Mac	(Venezuela) Angelo Fontana (United States) Christian Potolicchio	(Italy) Paolo Calcagno (Italy) Diego Stifter (Italy) Lodovico Laurini	(Italy) Davide Di Benedetto (Italy) Giuseppe Nicolosi (Italy) Gianluca Carboni
7	R1	(Emilia-Romagna) Imola	27/28 September	(Germany) N. 99 Tresor Attempto Racing	(Italy) N. 66 VSR	(Italy) N. 64 Antonelli Motorsport	(Italy) N. 111 Best Lap	(Italy) N. 276 Villorba Corse	(Italy) N. 433 Racevent	(Italy) N. 564 AKM Motorsport
7	R1	(Emilia-Romagna) Imola	27/28 September	(Italy) Rocco Mazzola (Germany) Fabio Rauer	(Italy) Ignazio Zanon (Italy) Mattia Michelotto	(Germany) Florian Scholze (Israel) Guy Albag	(Italy) Lorenzo Pegoraro (Italy) Filippo Croccolino	(Japan) Hiroshi Hamaguchi (Japan) Mineki Ōkura	(Italy) Diego Stifter (Italy) Matteo Martinelli	(Italy) Piero Cristoni (San Marino) Marco Antonelli
7	R2	(Emilia-Romagna) Imola	27/28 September	(Italy) N. 63 VSR	(Italy) N. 51 AF Corse	(Italy) N. 88 Tresor Attempto Racing	(Italy) N. 171 Pinetti Motorsport	(Italy) N. 273 DL Racing	(Switzerland) N. 492 Centri Porsche Ticino	(Italy) N. 529 Racevent
7	R2	(Emilia-Romagna) Imola	27/28 September	(Italy) Andrea Frassineti (United Kingdom) Sandy Mitchell	(Italy) Lorenzo Ferrari (India) Mahaveer Raghunathan	(Italy) Alberto Clementi Pisani (Italy) Marco Cassarà	(Italy) Marco Zanasi (Italy) Andrea Belicchi	(Italy) Diego Locanto (Italy) Nicola Tagliapietra	(Switzerland) Alex Fontana (Slovenia) Matej Knez	(Italy) Giovanni Stefanin (Italy) Lodovico Laurini
8	R1	(Lombardy) Monza	25/26 October	(Italy) N. 1 BMW Italia Ceccato Racing	(Italy) N. 66 VSR	(Italy) N. 39 Target Racing	(Italy) N. 117 MM Motorsport	(Italy) N. 251 CRM Motorsport	(Italy) N. 412 MRNC12	(Italy) N. 545 ZRS Motorsport
8	R1	(Lombardy) Monza	25/26 October	(Germany) Jens Klingmann (Finland) Jesse Krohn	(Italy) Ignazio Zanon (Italy) Mattia Michelotto	(China) Han Huilin	(Argentina) Franco Girolami (Italy) Leonardo Arduini	(Italy) Ettore Carminati (Italy) Bernardo Pellegrini	(Italy) Riccardo Paniccià (Germany) Montego Maassen	(Italy) Steven Giacon (Italy) Carlo Contessi
8	R2	(Lombardy) Monza	25/26 October	(Italy) N. 63 VSR	(Italy) N. 51 AF Corse	(Italy) N. 39 Target Racing	(Italy) N. 172 DL Racing	(Italy) N. 288 HC Racing Division	(Italy) N. 469 Raptor Engineering	(Italy) N. 505 Scuderia Emme
8	R2	(Lombardy) Monza	25/26 October	(Italy) Andrea Frassineti (Italy) Edoardo Liberati	(Italy) Lorenzo Ferrari (India) Mahaveer Raghunathan	(China) Han Huilin	(Italy) Vittorio Viglietti (Italy) Riccardo Ianniello	(Italy) Piergiacomo Randazzo (Italy) Gaetano Oliva	(Italy) Flavio Olivieri	(Italy) Alessandro Marchetti (Italy) Rodolfo Massaro

== Sprint ==
=== Entry list ===
Team	Car	Engine	No.	Drivers	Class	Rounds
GT3
(Italy) BMW Italia Ceccato Racing	BMW M4 GT3 Evo	BMW S58B30T0 3.0 L Twin Turbo I6	1	(Germany) Jens Klingmann	P	All
(Italy) BMW Italia Ceccato Racing	BMW M4 GT3 Evo	BMW S58B30T0 3.0 L Twin Turbo I6	1	(Finland) Jesse Krohn	P	All
(Italy) BMW Italia Ceccato Racing	BMW M4 GT3 Evo	BMW S58B30T0 3.0 L Twin Turbo I6	2	(Finland) William Alatalo	PA	All
(Italy) BMW Italia Ceccato Racing	BMW M4 GT3 Evo	BMW S58B30T0 3.0 L Twin Turbo I6	2	(Italy) Leonardo Caglioni	PA	All
(Italy) VSR	Lamborghini Huracán GT3 Evo 2	Lamborghini DGF 5.2 L V10	6	(Italy) Loris Spinelli	P	3–4
(Italy) VSR	Lamborghini Huracán GT3 Evo 2	Lamborghini DGF 5.2 L V10	6	(France) Franck Perera	P	3
(Italy) VSR	Lamborghini Huracán GT3 Evo 2	Lamborghini DGF 5.2 L V10	6	(United Kingdom) Sandy Mitchell	P	4
(Italy) VSR	Lamborghini Huracán GT3 Evo 2	Lamborghini DGF 5.2 L V10	19	(Italy) Alessio Deledda	P	All
(Italy) VSR	Lamborghini Huracán GT3 Evo 2	Lamborghini DGF 5.2 L V10	19	(United Kingdom) Finlay Hutchison	P	1
(Italy) VSR	Lamborghini Huracán GT3 Evo 2	Lamborghini DGF 5.2 L V10	19	(Japan) Yuki Nemoto	P	2–3
(Italy) VSR	Lamborghini Huracán GT3 Evo 2	Lamborghini DGF 5.2 L V10	19	(Switzerland) Kevin Gilardoni	P	4
(Italy) VSR	Lamborghini Huracán GT3 Evo 2	Lamborghini DGF 5.2 L V10	63	(Italy) Andrea Frassineti	P	All
(Italy) VSR	Lamborghini Huracán GT3 Evo 2	Lamborghini DGF 5.2 L V10	63	(Italy) Edoardo Liberati	P	1–2, 4
(Italy) VSR	Lamborghini Huracán GT3 Evo 2	Lamborghini DGF 5.2 L V10	63	(United Kingdom) Sandy Mitchell	P	3
(Italy) VSR	Lamborghini Huracán GT3 Evo 2	Lamborghini DGF 5.2 L V10	66	(Italy) Mattia Michelotto	PA	All
(Italy) VSR	Lamborghini Huracán GT3 Evo 2	Lamborghini DGF 5.2 L V10	66	(Italy) Ignazio Zanon	PA	All
(Germany) Getspeed Performance	Mercedes-AMG GT3 Evo	Mercedes-AMG M159 6.2 L V8	10	(United Kingdom) Ameerh Naran	Am	4
(Italy) Antonelli Motorsport	Mercedes-AMG GT3 Evo	Mercedes-AMG M159 6.2 L V8	16	(United States) Aaron Farhadi	Am	2–4
(Italy) Antonelli Motorsport	Mercedes-AMG GT3 Evo	Mercedes-AMG M159 6.2 L V8	64	(Germany) Florian Scholze	PA	1–2
(Italy) Antonelli Motorsport	Mercedes-AMG GT3 Evo	Mercedes-AMG M159 6.2 L V8	64	(Italy) Alex Frassineti	PA	1
(Italy) Antonelli Motorsport	Mercedes-AMG GT3 Evo	Mercedes-AMG M159 6.2 L V8	64	(Italy) Matteo Cairoli	PA	2
(Italy) Antonelli Motorsport	Mercedes-AMG GT3 Evo	Mercedes-AMG M159 6.2 L V8	64	(Germany) Florian Scholze	Am	3–4
(Italy) Antonelli Motorsport	Mercedes-AMG GT3 Evo	Mercedes-AMG M159 6.2 L V8	64	(Israel) Guy Albag	Am	3
(Italy) Antonelli Motorsport	Mercedes-AMG GT3 Evo	Mercedes-AMG M159 6.2 L V8	64	(Italy) Marco Antonelli	Am	4
(Italy) ASR	Lamborghini Huracán GT3 Evo 2	Lamborghini DGF 5.2 L V10	18	(Germany) Michael Fischbaum	PA	3–4
(Italy) ASR	Lamborghini Huracán GT3 Evo 2	Lamborghini DGF 5.2 L V10	18	(Serbia) Miloš Pavlović	PA	3–4
(San Marino) Audi Sport Italia	Audi R8 LMS Evo II	Audi DAR 5.2 L V10	21	(Italy) Alessandro Bracalente	PA	All
(San Marino) Audi Sport Italia	Audi R8 LMS Evo II	Audi DAR 5.2 L V10	21	(Argentina) Nazareno Lopez	PA	All
(Italy) AF Corse	Ferrari 296 GT3	Ferrari F163 3.0 L Turbo V6	27	(Brazil) Rafael Durán	Am	3
(Italy) AF Corse	Ferrari 296 GT3	Ferrari F163 3.0 L Turbo V6	27	(Singapore) Sean Hudspeth	Am	3
(Italy) AF Corse	Ferrari 296 GT3	Ferrari F163 3.0 L Turbo V6	51	(Italy) Lorenzo Ferrari	PA	All
(Italy) AF Corse	Ferrari 296 GT3	Ferrari F163 3.0 L Turbo V6	51	(India) Mahaveer Raghunathan	PA	All
(Italy) AF Corse	Ferrari 296 GT3	Ferrari F163 3.0 L Turbo V6	52	(United States) Ziad Ghandour	Am	1–3
(Italy) AF Corse	Ferrari 296 GT3	Ferrari F163 3.0 L Turbo V6	62	(Egypt) Ibrahim Badawy	PA	All
(Italy) AF Corse	Ferrari 296 GT3	Ferrari F163 3.0 L Turbo V6	62	(Italy) Leonardo Colavita	PA	All
(Italy) Target Racing	Ferrari 296 GT3	Ferrari F163 3.0 L Turbo V6	39	(China) Huilin Han	Am	All
(Italy) Ebimotors	Porsche 911 GT3 R (992)	Porsche M97/80 4.2 L Flat-6	44	(Italy) Alessandro Baccani	Am	All
(Italy) Ebimotors	Porsche 911 GT3 R (992)	Porsche M97/80 4.2 L Flat-6	44	(Italy) Paolo Venerosi	Am	All
(Italy) Imperiale Racing	Lamborghini Huracán GT3 Evo 2	Lamborghini DGF 5.2 L V10	54	(Italy) Alessandro Tarabini	PA	All
(Italy) Imperiale Racing	Lamborghini Huracán GT3 Evo 2	Lamborghini DGF 5.2 L V10	54	(Hong Kong) Edgar Lau	PA	1–2
(Italy) Imperiale Racing	Lamborghini Huracán GT3 Evo 2	Lamborghini DGF 5.2 L V10	54	(Italy) Jacopo Guidetti	PA	3–4
(Italy) Imperiale Racing	Lamborghini Huracán GT3 Evo 2	Lamborghini DGF 5.2 L V10	85	(Belize) Alexander Bowen	P	All
(Italy) Imperiale Racing	Lamborghini Huracán GT3 Evo 2	Lamborghini DGF 5.2 L V10	85	(United States) Philippe Denes	P	All
(Italy) Nova Race Events	Honda NSX GT3 Evo25	Honda JNC1 3.5 L Twin Turbo V6	55	(Italy) Daniele di Amato	P	All
(Italy) Nova Race Events	Honda NSX GT3 Evo25	Honda JNC1 3.5 L Twin Turbo V6	55	(Italy) Felice Jelmini	P	1–3
(Italy) Nova Race Events	Honda NSX GT3 Evo25	Honda JNC1 3.5 L Twin Turbo V6	55	(Italy) Leonardo Moncini	P	4
(Italy) Nova Race Events	Honda NSX GT3 Evo25	Honda JNC1 3.5 L Twin Turbo V6	77	(Italy) Luca Magnoni	Am	1–2, 4
(Italy) Nova Race Events	Honda NSX GT3 Evo25	Honda JNC1 3.5 L Twin Turbo V6	77	(Italy) Paolo Rocca	Am	1–2, 4
(Italy) Iron Lynx	Mercedes-AMG GT3 Evo	Mercedes-AMG M159 6.2 L V8	61	(Switzerland) Jean-Luc D'Auria	P	4
(Italy) Iron Lynx	Mercedes-AMG GT3 Evo	Mercedes-AMG M159 6.2 L V8	61	(Netherlands) Lin Hodenius	P	4
(Italy) Rossocorsa Racing	Ferrari 296 GT3	Ferrari F163 3.0 L Turbo V6	74	(Italy) Samuele Buttarelli	PA	2
(Italy) Rossocorsa Racing	Ferrari 296 GT3	Ferrari F163 3.0 L Turbo V6	74	(Italy) Stefano Marazzi	PA	2
(Italy) Tresor Attempto Racing	Audi R8 LMS Evo II	Audi DAR 5.2 L V10	88	(Italy) Marco Cassarà	Am	All
(Italy) Tresor Attempto Racing	Audi R8 LMS Evo II	Audi DAR 5.2 L V10	88	(Italy) Alberto Clementi Pisani	Am	All
(Italy) Tresor Attempto Racing	Audi R8 LMS Evo II	Audi DAR 5.2 L V10	99	(Italy) Rocco Mazzola	P	All
(Italy) Tresor Attempto Racing	Audi R8 LMS Evo II	Audi DAR 5.2 L V10	99	(Germany) Fabio Rauer	P	All

Icon	Class
GT3 entries
**P**	Pro Cup
**PA**	Pro-Am Cup
**Am**	Am Cup
GT Cup entries
Icon	Class
**PA**	Pro-Am Cup
**Am**	Am Cup

=== Drivers' championships ===
==== Scoring system ====
At the end of the season, the lowest race score was dropped. In order to participate in the final rankings of the Championship, each driver must have carried out at least three events.

Position	**1st**	**2nd**	**3rd**	**4th**	**5th**	**6th**	**7th**	**8th**	**9th**	**10th**
Points	20	15	12	10	8	6	4	3	2	1

==== GT3 ====
Pos.	Driver	Team	VAL		MUG		IMO		MNZ		Pts	Net Points
Pos.	Driver	Team	R1	R2	R1	R2	R1	R2	R1	R2	Pts	Net Points
1	(Italy) Andrea Frassineti	(Italy) VSR	2	2	5	1	8	**1**	6	**1**	107	104
2	(Germany) Jens Klingmann (Finland) Jesse Krohn	(Italy) BMW Italia Ceccato Racing	1	7	1	3	7	3	1	3	104	100
3	(Italy) Edoardo Liberati	(Italy) VSR	2	2	5	1			6	**1**	84	84
4	(Italy) Daniele di Amato	(Italy) Nova Race Events	Ret	4	11	2	2	7	2	5	67	67
5	(Finland) William Alatalo (Italy) Leonardo Caglioni	(Italy) BMW Italia Ceccato Racing	3	Ret	2	5	4	6	4	19†	61	61
6	(Italy) Rocco Mazzola (Germany) Fabio Rauer	(Italy) Tresor Attempto Racing	4	6	6	8	1	10	8	4	59	58
7	(Italy) Mattia Michelotto (Italy) Ignazio Zanon	(Italy) VSR	**9**	5	9	4	3	8	**3**	8	52	50
8	(Egypt) Ibrahim Badawy (Italy) Leonardo Colavita	(Italy) AF Corse	8	9	3	6	5	5	5	7	51	49
9	(Italy) Lorenzo Ferrari (India) Mahaveer Raghunathan	(Italy) AF Corse	7	**1**	8	**10**	**10**	4	7	6	49	48
10	(Italy) Felice Jelmini	(Italy) Nova Race Events	Ret	4	11	2	2	7			44	44
11	(Italy) Alessio Deledda	(Italy) VSR	5	8	4	7	6	11	9	20†	33	33
12	(Belize) Alexander Bowen (United States) Philippe Denes	(Italy) Imperiale Racing	6	3	12	11	Ret	9	Ret	12	20	20
13	(Germany) Florian Scholze	(Italy) Antonelli Motorsport	11	10	**7**	9	13	13	14	Ret	7	7
14	(Italy) Alessandro Bracalente (Argentina) Nazareno Lopez	(San Marino) Audi Sport Italia	10	Ret	Ret	19†	9	Ret	13	9	5	5
15	(Italy) Marco Cassarà (Italy) Alberto Clementi Pisani	(Italy) Tresor Attempto Racing	14	11	10	14	14	12	Ret	14	1	1
16	(China) Huilin Han	(Italy) Target Racing	17	12	15	12	17	17	11	13	0	0
16	(Italy) Alessandro Baccani (Italy) Paolo Venerosi	(Italy) Ebimotors	15	15	16	18	19	18	18	15	0	0
16	(Italy) Alessandro Tarabini	(Italy) Imperiale Racing	12	16	17	17	12	14	Ret	11	0	0
17	(United States) Ziad Ghandour	(Italy) AF Corse	16	14	Ret	13	Ret	19			0	0
17	(United States) Aaron Farhadi	(Italy) Antonelli Motorsport			18	15	16	15	17	17	0	0
17	(Italy) Luca Magnoni (Italy) Paolo Rocca	(Italy) Nova Race Events	13	13	13	16			12	Ret	0	0
Not classified
—	(United Kingdom) Sandy Mitchell	(Italy) VSR					8	**1**	19	2	38	0
—	(Italy) Loris Spinelli	(Italy) VSR					11	2	19	2	30	0
—	(Italy) Leonardo Moncini	(Italy) Nova Race Events							2	5	23	0
—	(Japan) Yuki Nemoto	(Italy) VSR			4	7	6	11			20	0
—	(France) Franck Perera	(Italy) VSR					11	2			15	0
—	(United Kingdom) Finlay Hutchison	(Italy) VSR	5	8							11	0
—	(Italy) Matteo Cairoli	(Italy) Antonelli Motorsport			**7**	9					6	0
—	(Switzerland) Kevin Gilardoni	(Italy) VSR							9	20†	2	0
—	(Switzerland) Jean-Luc D'Auria (Netherlands) Lin Hodenius	(Italy) Iron Lynx							10	10	2	0
—	(Italy) Alex Frassineti	(Italy) Antonelli Motorsport	11	10							1	0
—	(United Kingdom) Ameerh Naran	(Germany) Getspeed Performance							15	16	0	0
—	(Germany) Michael Fischbaum (Serbia) Miloš Pavlović	(Italy) ASR					18	20	16	18	0	0
—	(Italy) Jacopo Guidetti	(Italy) Imperiale Racing					12	14	Ret	11	0	0
—	(Italy) Marco Antonelli	(Italy) Antonelli Motorsport							14	Ret	0	0
—	(Brazil) Rafael Durán (Singapore) Sean Hudspeth	(Italy) AF Corse					15	16			0	0
—	(Hong Kong) Edgar Lau	(Italy) Imperiale Racing	12	16	17	17					0	0
—	(Israel) Guy Albag	(Italy) Antonelli Motorsport					13	13			0	0
—	(Italy) Samuele Buttarelli (Italy) Stefano Marazzi	(Italy) Rossocorsa Racing			14	Ret					0	0
Pos.	Driver	Team	R1	R2	R1	R2	R1	R2	R1	R2	Pts	Net Points
Pos.	Driver	Team	VAL		MUG		IMO		MNZ		Pts	Net Points

Colour	Result
Gold	Winner
Silver	Second place
Bronze	Third place
Green	Points classification
Blue	Non-points classification
Blue	Non-classified finish (NC)
Purple	Retired, not classified (Ret)
Red	Did not qualify (DNQ)
Red	Did not pre-qualify (DNPQ)
Black	Disqualified (DSQ)
White	Did not start (DNS)
White	Withdrew (WD)
White	Race cancelled (C)
Blank	Did not practice (DNP)
Blank	Did not arrive (DNA)
Blank	Excluded (EX)

**Bold** - Pole position/fastest qualifying time
Italics - Fastest lap
