= Yuki Nemoto =

Japanese racing driver

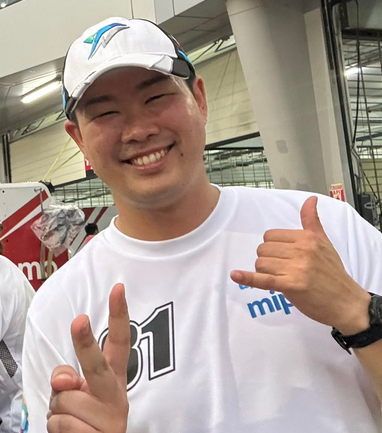
- Nemoto at the 2025 Super GT Malaysia Festival
- Nationality: (Japan) Japanese
- Born: September 22, 1996 (age 30) Inagi, Tokyo, Japan

Super GT Series - GT300 career
- Debut season: 2020
- Current team: apr
- Categorisation: FIA Silver
- Car number: 31
- Starts: 4
- Wins: 0
- Podiums: 1
- Poles: 0
- Fastest laps: 0
- Best finish: 11th in 2023

Previous series
- 2022-23 2021 2021 2016, 2020-22 2020 2019 2018 2017 2017, 2020 2015-16 2014 2013: GT World Challenge Europe Endurance Cup; International GT Open; Asian Le Mans Series; Italian GT Championship; Formula Regional Japanese Championship; Lamborghini Super Trofeo Asia; Japanese Formula 3 Championship; Blancpain GT Series Asia; Lamborghini Super Trofeo Europe; F4 Japanese Championship; JAF Japan Formula 4 Formula Challenge Japan

Yuki Nemoto (根本悠生, Nemoto Yūki; born September 22, 1996) is a Japanese racing driver who last competed in Super GT for apr, and in the GT World Challenge Europe Sprint Cup with Vincenzo Sospiri Racing. He has spent most of his career racing in Italy with VSR, winning the Italian GT Championship twice with the team - once in the Sprint category in 2020, and again in the Endurance Championship in 2022.

== Racing career ==
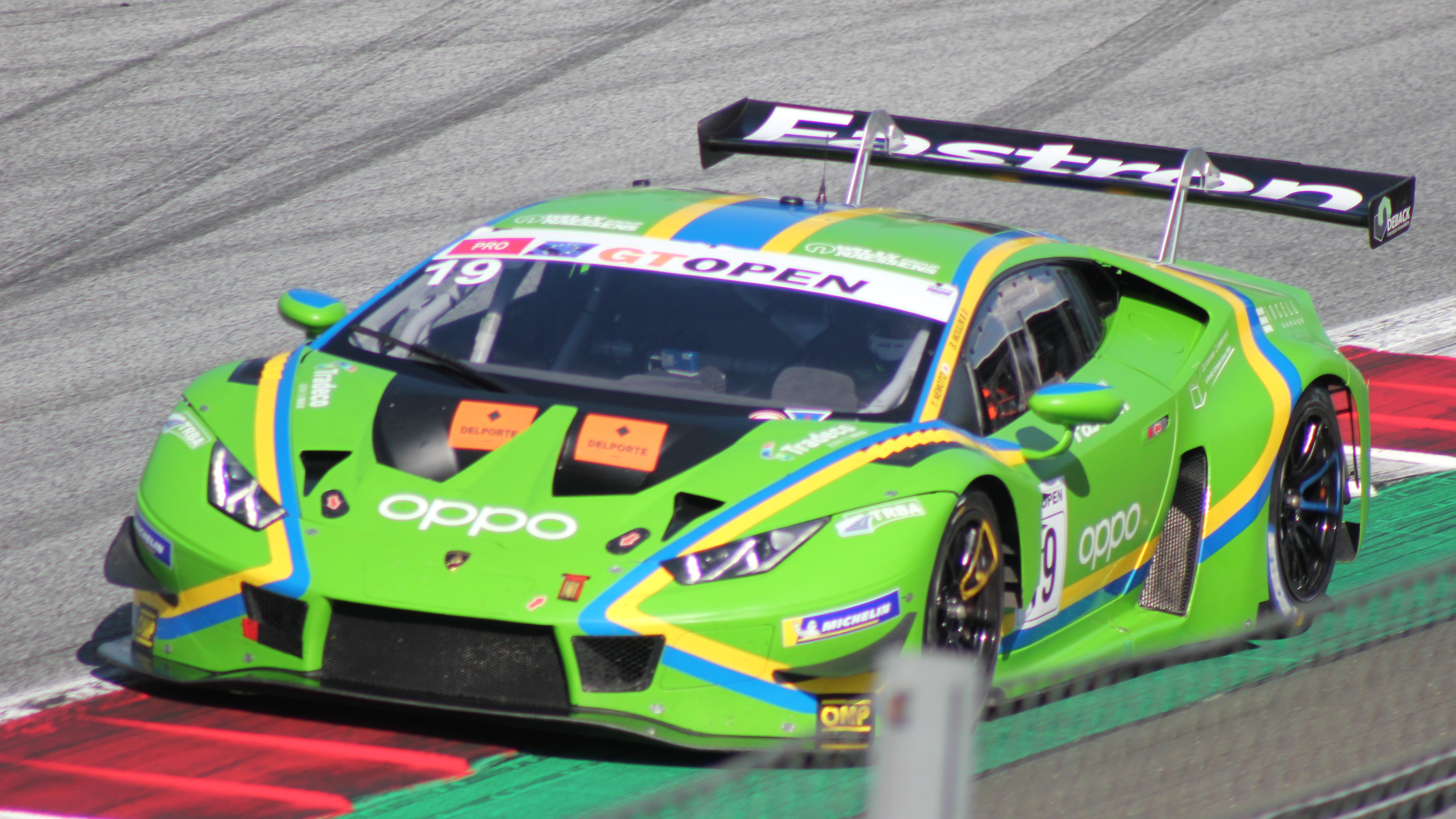
Nemoto car in 2023 International GT Open

Nemoto raced in F4 Japanese Championship for two seasons with KCMG where he settled seventh & 13th respectively with three podiums during those seasons. In 2018, Nemoto competed in Japanese Formula 3 Championship with Albirex Racing Team. He only competed for couple of rounds where he claimed one podium. In 2020, Nemoto raced his last formula racing in Formula Regional Japanese Championship with Zak Speed for one round at Sportsland SUGO. On that season, he claimed his first win, and couple of podiums. For 2023, Nemoto made his debut in Super GT - GT300 with apr with their new car Lexus LC500h, as the third driver. Nemoto claimed his Super GT podium at Autopolis, and for the last round at Motegi, he competed with Kazuto Kotaka, as he replaced original driver Koki Saga.

== Racing record ==
=== Racing career summary ===
Season	Series	Team	Races	Wins	Poles	F/Laps	Podiums	Points	Position
2013	Formula Challenge Japan	Tokyo Toyopet FTRS	12	0	0	0	0	7	11th
2014	JAF Japan Formula 4 - West	WiLLDO ZTE Spirit	6	1	1	0	1	32	7th
2014	JAF Japan Formula 4 - East	WiLLDO ZTE Spirit	4	3	2	3	3	68	**2nd**
2015	F4 Japanese Championship	KCMG	14	0	1	0	2	47	7th
2016	F4 Japanese Championship	KCMG	14	0	0	0	1	53	13th
2016	Italian GT Championship - Super GT Cup	Vincenzo Sospiri Racing	6	4	2	3	5	102	9th
2017	Lamborghini Super Trofeo Europe	VS Racing	12	1	2	2	7	121	4th
2017	Lamborghini Super Trofeo World Final	VS Racing	2	0	0	0	0	8	**2nd**
2017	Blancpain GT Series Asia - GT3	Vincenzo Sospiri Racing	2	0	0	0	0	18	23rd
2018	Japanese Formula 3 Championship	Albirex Racing Team	15	0	0	0	1	7	9th
2019	Lamborghini Super Trofeo Asia	VSR	6	2	1	1	6	49	6th
2019	Lamborghini Super Trofeo World Final	VS Racing	2	0	0	0	0	8	7th
2020	Italian GT Sprint Championship - GT3	Vincenzo Sospiri Racing	8	2	1	0	4	76	**1st**
2020	Italian GT Endurance Championship - GT3	Vincenzo Sospiri Racing	2	0	0	0	1	22	10th
2020	Lamborghini Super Trofeo Europe	VS Racing	1	1	0	0	1	0	NC
2020	Formula Regional Japanese Championship	Zap Speed	3	1	0	0	3	58	8th
2020	Super Taikyu - ST-X	Mercedes-AMG Team Hirix Racing	3	2	0	0	2	105‡	**1st‡**
2021	International GT Open	Vincenzo Sospiri Racing	14	0	0	0	7	105	4th
2021	GT World Challenge Europe Endurance Cup	Vincenzo Sospiri Racing	1	0	0	0	0	0	NC
2021	Asian Le Mans Series - GT	Garage 59	4	0	0	0	0	4.5	14th
2022	Italian GT Endurance Championship	Vincenzo Sospiri Racing	4	2	0	1	3	55	**1st**
2022	GT World Challenge Europe Endurance Cup	Vincenzo Sospiri Racing	5	0	0	0	0	28	12th
2022	Intercontinental GT Challenge	Vincenzo Sospiri Racing	1	0	0	0	0	0	NC
2023	Super GT - GT300	apr	4	0	0	0	1	33	11th
2023	GT World Challenge Europe Sprint Cup	VSR	8	0	0	0	0	0	NC
2024	Super GT - GT300	apr	5	0	0	1	1	0	NA
2024	GT World Challenge Asia	ANR with VSR	12	0	0	0	0	0	NC
2024	SRO Japan Cup - GT3	ANR with VSR	2	0	0	0	1	21	11th
2025	Super GT - GT300	apr	3	0	0	0	0	0	NC
2025	Italian GT Championship Sprint Cup - GT3	VSR	4	0	0	0	0	20	NC†

‡ Team standings

=== Complete F4 Japanese Championship results ===
(key) (Races in bold indicate pole position) (Races in italics indicate fastest lap)

Year	Team	1	2	3	4	5	6	7	8	9	10	11	12	13	14	DC	Pts
2015	KCMG	OKA; 1 Ret	OKA; 2; 10	FUJ1; 1; 8	FUJ1; 2; 7	FUJ2; 1; 12	FUJ2; 2 Ret	SUZ; 1; 10	SUZ; 2; 5	SUG; 1; 15	SUG; 2; 14	AUT; 1; 14	AUT; 2; 8	**MOT**; **1**; **2**	MOT; 2; 3	7th	47
2016	KCMG	OKA; 1; 9	OKA; 2; 7	FUJ1; 1; 6	FUJ1; 2; 6	SUG; 1 Ret	SUG; 2; 3	FUJ2; 1 Ret	FUJ2; 2; 7	FUJ2; 3; 19	SUZ; 1; 10	SUZ; 2; 10	MOT; 1; 20	MOT; 2; 7	MOT; 3; 13	13th	53

=== Complete Japanese Formula 3 Championship results ===
(key) (Races in bold indicate pole position) (Races in italics indicate fastest lap)

Year	Team	Engine	1	2	3	4	5	6	7	8	9	10	11	12	13	14	15	16	17	18	19	20	21	Pos	Points
2018	Albirex Racing Team	Mercedes-Benz	SUZ; 1; 9	SUZ; 2; 10	SUG1; 1; 9	SUG1; 2; 7	FUJ1; 1; 9	FUJ1; 2; 8	OKA1; 1	OKA1; 2	OKA1; 3	MOT; 1; 8	MOT; 2; 13	MOT; 3; 8	OKA2; 1; 3	OKA2; 2; 6	OKA2; 3 C	SUG2; 1; 13	SUG2; 2; 10	SUG2; 3; 6	SUG2; 4 Ret	FUJ2; 1	FUJ2; 2	9th	7

=== Complete Formula Regional Japanese Championship results ===
(key) (Races in bold indicate pole position) (Races in italics indicate fastest lap)

Year	Entrant	1	2	3	4	5	6	7	8	9	10	11	12	13	14	Pos	Points
2020	Zap Speed	FUJ1; 1	FUJ1; 2	FUJ1; 3	SUG; 1; 3	SUG; 2; 1	SUG; 3; 2	FUJ2; 1	FUJ2; 2	MOT; 1	MOT; 2	OKA; 1	OKA; 2	AUT; 1	AUT; 2	8th	58

=== Complete Super GT results ===
(key) (Races in bold indicate pole position; races in italics indicate fastest lap)

Year	Entrant	Car	Class	1	2	3	4	5	6	7	8	9	DC	Points
2023	apr	Lexus LC 500h GT	GT300	OKA	FUJ; 8	SUZ; 13	FUJ; 5	SUZ; 6	SUG	AUT; 3	MOT; 4		11th	33
2024	apr	Lexus LC 500h GT	GT300	OKA	FUJ; 5†	SUZ; 4†	FUJ; 12	SUG	AUT; 14	MOT	SUZ; 3†		NC	0
2025	apr	Lexus LC 500h GT	GT300	OKA; 22	FUJ; 19	SEP	FS1	FS2	SUZ	SUG	AUT; DSQ	MOT	NC	0

^{*} Season still in progress.
^{†} did not run during the race as a third driver and was ineligible for championship points.
