= 2021 Italian GT Championship =

The 2021 Italian GT Championship was the 30th season of the Italian GT Championship, the grand tourer-style sports car racing founded by the Italian automobile club (Automobile Club d'Italia). The Championship consists of four Sprint race events and four Endurance race events. At each Sprint race event there were held two races. The Season started on 1 May at Monza and ended on 31 October at Monza.

== Calendar ==
Round	Circuit	Date	Type
1	Autodromo Nazionale di Monza	30 April - 2 May	Sprint
2	Autodromo di Pergusa	21 - 23 May	Endurance
3	Misano World Circuit Marco Simoncelli	4 - 6 June	Sprint
4	Autodromo Internazionale del Mugello	2 - 4 July	Endurance
5	Autodromo Internazionale Enzo e Dino Ferrari	3 - 5 September	Sprint
6	ACI Vallelunga Circuit	17 - 19 September	Endurance
7	Autodromo Internazionale del Mugello	8 - 10 October	Sprint
8	Autodromo Nazionale di Monza	29 - 31 October	Endurance

== Teams and Drivers ==
=== GT3 ===
Team	Car	No.	Driver	Class	Rounds
(Italy) Easy Race	Ferrari 488 GT3 Evo 2020	3	(Italy) Matteo Greco	P	All
(Italy) Easy Race	Ferrari 488 GT3 Evo 2020	3	(Italy) Fabrizio Crestani	P	1–5
(Italy) Easy Race	Ferrari 488 GT3 Evo 2020	3	(Italy) Luca Filippi	P	2, 4
(Italy) Easy Race	Ferrari 488 GT3 Evo 2020	3	(Austria) Max Hofer	P	6, 8
(Italy) Easy Race	Ferrari 488 GT3 Evo 2020	3	(Italy) Daniel Mancinelli	P	6
(Italy) Easy Race	Ferrari 488 GT3 Evo 2020	3	(Poland) Karol Basz	P	7
(Italy) Ceccato Racing	BMW M6 GT3	7	(Italy) Stefano Comandini	P	All
(Italy) Ceccato Racing	BMW M6 GT3	7	(Germany) Marius Zug	P	All
(Italy) Ceccato Racing	BMW M6 GT3	7	(Canada) Bruno Spengler	P	2, 4, 6, 8
(Italy) AF Corse	Ferrari 488 GT3 Evo 2020	8	(Germany) Carrie Schreiner	PA	1, 5–7
(Italy) AF Corse	Ferrari 488 GT3 Evo 2020	8	(Singapore) Sean Hudspeth	PA	1, 3, 7
(Italy) AF Corse	Ferrari 488 GT3 Evo 2020	8	(Italy) Antonio Fuoco	PA	3, 6
(Italy) AF Corse	Ferrari 488 GT3 Evo 2020	8	(Italy) Daniel Zampieri	PA	5
(Italy) AF Corse	Ferrari 488 GT3 Evo 2020	8	(Italy) Giorgio Roda	PA	6
(Italy) AF Corse	Ferrari 488 GT3 Evo 2020	8	(Germany) Carrie Schreiner	P	2, 4, 8
(Italy) AF Corse	Ferrari 488 GT3 Evo 2020	8	(Singapore) Sean Hudspeth	P	2, 4, 8
(Italy) AF Corse	Ferrari 488 GT3 Evo 2020	8	(Italy) Antonio Fuoco	P	2, 4
(Italy) AF Corse	Ferrari 488 GT3 Evo 2020	8	(Italy) Davide Rigon	P	8
(Italy) AF Corse	Ferrari 488 GT3 Evo 2020	21	(United States) Simon Mann	PA	All
(Italy) AF Corse	Ferrari 488 GT3 Evo 2020	21	(Finland) Toni Vilander	PA	1, 3, 6, 8
(Italy) AF Corse	Ferrari 488 GT3 Evo 2020	21	(Italy) Matteo Cressoni	PA	2, 4–5, 7
(Italy) AF Corse	Ferrari 488 GT3 Evo 2020	51	(United States) Peter Mann	Am	1, 3, 5, 7
(Italy) AF Corse	Ferrari 488 GT3 Evo 2020	51	(Italy) Lorenzo Casè	Am	1, 3, 5, 7
(Italy) AF Corse	Ferrari 488 GT3 Evo 2020	52	(France) Hugo Delacour	Am	7
(Italy) AF Corse	Ferrari 488 GT3 Evo 2020	52	(Monaco) Cédric Sbirrazzuoli	Am	7
(Switzerland) Kessel Racing	Ferrari 488 GT3 Evo 2020	11	(United States) Stephen Earle	Am	1, 3, 5, 7
(Switzerland) Kessel Racing	Ferrari 488 GT3 Evo 2020	11	(Italy) Niccolò Schirò	Am	3, 5, 7
(Switzerland) Kessel Racing	Ferrari 488 GT3 Evo 2020	11	(United States) Stephen Earle	PA	2, 4, 6, 8
(Switzerland) Kessel Racing	Ferrari 488 GT3 Evo 2020	11	(South Africa) David Perel	PA	2, 4, 8
(Switzerland) Kessel Racing	Ferrari 488 GT3 Evo 2020	11	(Italy) Niccolò Schirò	PA	4, 6, 8
(Switzerland) Kessel Racing	Ferrari 488 GT3 Evo 2020	33	(Turkey) Murat Cuhadaroglu	Am	1, 3, 5, 7
(Switzerland) Kessel Racing	Ferrari 488 GT3 Evo 2020	33	(Italy) Niccolò Schirò	Am	1
(Switzerland) Kessel Racing	Ferrari 488 GT3 Evo 2020	33	(Italy) David Fumanelli	Am	3, 5, 7
(Switzerland) Kessel Racing	Ferrari 488 GT3 Evo 2020	33	(Turkey) Murat Cuhadaroglu	PA	4, 8
(Switzerland) Kessel Racing	Ferrari 488 GT3 Evo 2020	33	(Italy) David Fumanelli	PA	4, 8
(San Marino) Audi Sport Italia	Audi R8 LMS Evo	12	(Italy) Lorenzo Ferrari	P	All
(San Marino) Audi Sport Italia	Audi R8 LMS Evo	12	(Italy) Riccardo Agostini	P	All
(San Marino) Audi Sport Italia	Audi R8 LMS Evo	12	(Italy) Mattia Drudi	P	2, 4, 6, 8
(San Marino) Audi Sport Italia	Audi R8 LMS Evo	14	(Italy) Vito Postiglione	P	All
(San Marino) Audi Sport Italia	Audi R8 LMS Evo	14	(Italy) Daniel Mancinelli	P	1, 3, 5, 7–8
(San Marino) Audi Sport Italia	Audi R8 LMS Evo	14	(Czech Republic) Filip Salaquarda	P	2, 4, 6, 8
(San Marino) Audi Sport Italia	Audi R8 LMS Evo	14	(Poland) Karol Basz	P	2, 4, 6
(Italy) Imperiale Racing	Lamborghini Huracán GT3 Evo	19	(Guatemala) Mateo Llarena	PA	1, 3, 5, 7
(Italy) Imperiale Racing	Lamborghini Huracán GT3 Evo	19	(Italy) Riccardo Cazzaniga	PA	1
(Italy) Imperiale Racing	Lamborghini Huracán GT3 Evo	19	(United Kingdom) Stuart Middleton	PA	3, 5
(Italy) Imperiale Racing	Lamborghini Huracán GT3 Evo	19	(Lithuania) Paul August	Am	6, 8
(Italy) Imperiale Racing	Lamborghini Huracán GT3 Evo	19	(France) Antoine Bottiroli	Am	6, 8
(Italy) Imperiale Racing	Lamborghini Huracán GT3 Evo	19	(Czech Republic) Jaromir Jirik	Am	6, 8
(Italy) Imperiale Racing	Lamborghini Huracán GT3 Evo	63	(Italy) Alex Frassineti	P	1, 3, 5, 7
(Italy) Imperiale Racing	Lamborghini Huracán GT3 Evo	63	(Italy) Luca Ghiotto	P	1, 3, 7
(Italy) Imperiale Racing	Lamborghini Huracán GT3 Evo	63	(Italy) Alberto Maria di Folco	P	2, 4–6, 8
(Italy) Imperiale Racing	Lamborghini Huracán GT3 Evo	63	(Italy) Andrea Amici	P	2, 4, 6, 8
(Italy) Imperiale Racing	Lamborghini Huracán GT3 Evo	63	(United Kingdom) Stuart Middleton	P	2, 4, 6, 8
(Italy) RS Racing	Ferrari 488 GT3 Evo 2020	25	(Italy) Daniele Di Amato	P	3, 5
(Italy) RS Racing	Ferrari 488 GT3 Evo 2020	25	(Italy) Daniele Di Amato	PA	4, 6–8
(Italy) RS Racing	Ferrari 488 GT3 Evo 2020	25	(Italy) Alessandro Vezzoni	PA	4, 6, 8
(Italy) RS Racing	Ferrari 488 GT3 Evo 2020	25	(Austria) Alexander Nussbaumer	7	
(Italy) Scuderia Baldini 27	Ferrari 488 GT3 Evo 2020	27	(Italy) Daniel Zampieri	P	2, 4, 6, 8
(Italy) Scuderia Baldini 27	Ferrari 488 GT3 Evo 2020	27	(Italy) Stefano Gai	P	2, 4, 6, 8
(Italy) Scuderia Baldini 27	Ferrari 488 GT3 Evo 2020	27	(Italy) Giancarlo Fisichella	P	2, 4, 6
(Italy) Vincenzo Sospiri Racing	Lamborghini Huracán GT3 Evo	29	(Italy) Simone Iacone	Am	3, 5, 7
(Italy) Vincenzo Sospiri Racing	Lamborghini Huracán GT3 Evo	29	(Italy) Sascha Tempesta	Am	3, 5, 7
(Italy) Vincenzo Sospiri Racing	Lamborghini Huracán GT3 Evo	66	(Italy) Federico Leo	PA	7
(Italy) Vincenzo Sospiri Racing	Lamborghini Huracán GT3 Evo	66	(Ukraine) Ivan Peklin	PA	7
(Italy) Nova Race	Honda NSX GT3 Evo	55	(Italy) Jacopo Guidetti	PA	1, 3, 5, 7
(Italy) Nova Race	Honda NSX GT3 Evo	55	(Italy) Francesco Massimo De Luca	PA	1, 3, 5, 7
(Italy) Nova Race	Honda NSX GT3 Evo	77	(Italy) Erwin Zanotti	Am	1, 3–8
(Italy) Nova Race	Honda NSX GT3 Evo	77	(Spain) Jorge Cabezas	Am	3, 5, 7
(Italy) Nova Race	Honda NSX GT3 Evo	77	(Italy) Luca Magnoni	Am	4, 6, 8
(Italy) Nova Race	Honda NSX GT3 Evo	77	(Italy) Jacopo Guidetti	Am	6
(Italy) RAM Autoracing	Ferrari 488 GT3 Evo 2020	58	(Italy) Alberto Lippi	PA	1, 3
(Italy) RAM Autoracing	Ferrari 488 GT3 Evo 2020	58	(Italy) Luca Filippi	PA	1, 3
(Italy) Iron Lynx	Ferrari 488 GT3 Evo 2020	60	(Italy) Andrea Piccini	Am	4
(Italy) Iron Lynx	Ferrari 488 GT3 Evo 2020	60	(Italy) Claudio Schiavoni	Am	4
(Italy) Iron Lynx	Ferrari 488 GT3 Evo 2020	60	(Italy) Rino Mastronardi	Am	4
(Italy) Iron Lynx	Ferrari 488 GT3 Evo 2020	83	(Denmark) Michelle Gatting	Am	4
(Italy) Iron Lynx	Ferrari 488 GT3 Evo 2020	83	(Switzerland) Rahel Frey	Am	4
(Italy) Iron Lynx	Ferrari 488 GT3 Evo 2020	83	(Belgium) Sarah Bovy	Am	4
(Italy) LP Racing	Lamborghini Huracán GT3 Evo	88	(Italy) Pietro Perolini	PA	1–7
(Italy) LP Racing	Lamborghini Huracán GT3 Evo	88	(Venezuela) Jonathan Cecotto	PA	1, 3, 5, 7
(Italy) LP Racing	Lamborghini Huracán GT3 Evo	88	(Italy) Angelo Negro	PA	2, 4, 6
(Italy) LP Racing	Lamborghini Huracán GT3 Evo	88	(Italy) Lorenzo Veglia	PA	2, 4, 6
(San Marino) AKM Motorsport	Mercedes-AMG GT3 Evo	90	(Italy) Luca Segù	PA	1, 3, 5, 7
(San Marino) AKM Motorsport	Mercedes-AMG GT3 Evo	90	(Israel) Baruch Bar	PA	1, 3, 5, 7
Entry Lists:

Icon	Class
P	Pro Cup
PA	Pro-Am Cup
Am	Am Cup

=== GT Cup ===
Team	Car	No.	Driver	Rounds
(Italy) Tsunami RT	Porsche 991 Cup	303	(Italy) Giammarco Levorato	7
(Italy) Tsunami RT	Porsche 991 Cup	381	(Italy) Carlo Curti	1, 3, 5, 7
(Italy) Tsunami RT	Porsche 991 Cup	381	(Italy) Lino Curti	1, 5, 7
(Denmark) Formula Racing	Ferrari 488 Challenge Evo	304	(Denmark) Christian Brunsborg	7
(Denmark) Formula Racing	Ferrari 488 Challenge Evo	320	(Italy) Alessandro Cozzi	5
(Denmark) Formula Racing	Ferrari 488 Challenge Evo	320	(Italy) Giorgio Sernagiotto	5
(Denmark) Formula Racing	Ferrari 488 Challenge Evo	382	(Netherlands) Willem van der Vorm	7
(Denmark) Formula Racing	Ferrari 488 Challenge Evo	382	(Italy) Michele Rugolo	7
(Switzerland) Kessel Racing	Ferrari 488 Challenge Evo	307	(Netherlands) Fons Scheltema	7
(Switzerland) Kessel Racing	Ferrari 488 Challenge Evo	308	(Switzerland) Nicolò Rosi	7
(Switzerland) Kessel Racing	Ferrari 488 Challenge Evo	308	(Italy) Andrea Fausti	7
(Switzerland) Kessel Racing	Ferrari 488 Challenge Evo	309	(United Kingdom) Omar Jackson	7
(Switzerland) Kessel Racing	Ferrari 488 Challenge Evo	309	(United Kingdom) Charles Hollings	7
(Italy) Bonaldi Motorsport	Lamborghini Huracán Super Trofeo	311	(Italy) Sascha Tempesta	1
(Italy) Bonaldi Motorsport	Lamborghini Huracán Super Trofeo	311	(Italy) Simone Iacone	1
(Italy) Bonaldi Motorsport	Lamborghini Huracán Super Trofeo	351	(Italy) Fabio Vairani	1, 6
(Italy) Bonaldi Motorsport	Lamborghini Huracán Super Trofeo	351	(Netherlands) Daan Pijl	1
(Italy) Bonaldi Motorsport	Lamborghini Huracán Super Trofeo	351	(Serbia) Milos Pavlovic	3, 6
(Italy) Bonaldi Motorsport	Lamborghini Huracán Super Trofeo	351	(Germany) Frederic Michael Fischbaum	3, 6
(Italy) Best Lap	Ferrari 488 Challenge Evo	318	(Italy) Maurizio Pitorri	1, 3, 5, 7
(Italy) Best Lap	Ferrari 488 Challenge Evo	318	(Italy) Gianluigi Simonelli	1, 3, 5, 7
(Italy) Best Lap	Lamborghini Huracán Super Trofeo	391	(Italy) Lorenzo Pegoraro	1, 3, 5, 7
(Italy) Best Lap	Lamborghini Huracán Super Trofeo	391	(Italy) Massimilian Mugelli	1, 3, 5, 7
(Italy) AF Corse	Ferrari 488 Challenge Evo	321	(France) Hugo Delacour	4–5
(Italy) AF Corse	Ferrari 488 Challenge Evo	321	(Monaco) Cédric Sbirrazzuoli	4–5
(Italy) Krypton Motorsport	Porsche 991 Cup	322	(Italy) Gioavanni Berton	1, 3, 5, 7
(Italy) Krypton Motorsport	Porsche 991 Cup	322	(Italy) Giacomo Riva	1, 3, 5, 7
(Italy) Krypton Motorsport	Porsche 991 Cup	369	(Italy) Francesco La Mazza	1, 3, 5, 7
(Italy) Krypton Motorsport	Porsche 991 Cup	369	(Italy) Giuseppe Nicolosi	1, 3, 5, 7
(Italy) SR&R	Ferrari 488 Challenge Evo	333	(Italy) Luca Demarchi	All
(Italy) SR&R	Ferrari 488 Challenge Evo	333	(Italy) Nicholas Risitano	All
(Italy) SR&R	Ferrari 488 Challenge Evo	333	(Italy) Edoardo Barbolini	2, 4, 6, 8
(Italy) SR&R	Ferrari 458 Challenge	334	(Italy) Leonardo Becagli	4, 6
(Italy) SR&R	Ferrari 458 Challenge	334	(Italy) Jacopo Michele Baratto	4, 8
(Italy) SR&R	Ferrari 458 Challenge	334	(Italy) Giorgio Vinella	4
(Italy) SR&R	Ferrari 458 Challenge	334	(Italy) "Aramis"	6, 8
(Italy) SR&R	Ferrari 458 Challenge	334	(Italy) Simone Laureti	6
(Italy) SR&R	Ferrari 458 Challenge	334	(Italy) Alessio Bacci	8
(Italy) SR&R	Ferrari 488 Challenge Evo	334	(Italy) "Aramis"	5
(Italy) SR&R	Ferrari 488 Challenge Evo	334	(Italy) Edoardo Barbolini	5
(Italy) Easy Race	Ferrari 488 Challenge Evo	355	(Italy) Francesca Linossi	1, 3, 5, 7
(Italy) Easy Race	Ferrari 488 Challenge Evo	355	(Sweden) Daniel Vebster	1, 3, 5, 7
(Italy) Dinamic Motorsport	Porsche 991 Cup	361	(Italy) Alessandro Giardelli	1
(China) Rexal FFF Racing Team	Lamborghini Huracán Super Trofeo	377	(Italy) Luciano Privitelio	3, 7
(China) Rexal FFF Racing Team	Lamborghini Huracán Super Trofeo	377	(Italy) Donovan Privitelio	7
(Italy) RS Racing	Ferrari 488 Challenge Evo	378	(Germany) Axel Sartingen	7
(Italy) RS Racing	Ferrari 488 Challenge Evo	378	(Germany) Francesco Lopez	7
Team Italy	Lamborghini Huracán Super Trofeo	399	(Italy) Ermanno Dionisio	1, 3–5, 7
Team Italy	Lamborghini Huracán Super Trofeo	399	(Italy) Giacomo Barri	1, 3–5, 7
Team Italy	Lamborghini Huracán Super Trofeo	399	(Italy) Alfredo Varini	4
Entry Lists:

=== GT4 ===
Team	Car	No.	Driver	Class	Rounds
(Italy) Nova Race	Mercedes-AMG GT4	207	(Italy) Luca Magnoni	Am	1, 3, 5, 7
(Italy) Nova Race	Mercedes-AMG GT4	207	(Italy) Diego Di Fabio	Am	1, 3, 5, 7
(Italy) Nova Race	Mercedes-AMG GT4	228	(Italy) Fulvio Ferri	PA	1, 3, 5, 7
(Italy) Nova Race	Mercedes-AMG GT4	228	(Italy) Andrea Gagliardini	PA	1
(Italy) Nova Race	Mercedes-AMG GT4	228	(Italy) Enrico Garbelli	PA	3
(Italy) Nova Race	Mercedes-AMG GT4	228	(Italy) Enrico Bettera	PA	5, 7
(Italy) Ceccato Racing	BMW M4 GT4	215	(Italy) Nicola Neri	Am	All
(Italy) Ceccato Racing	BMW M4 GT4	215	(Italy) Giuseppe Fascicolo	Am	All
(Italy) Ceccato Racing	BMW M4 GT4	215	(Sweden) Alfred Nilsson	Am	2, 4, 6, 8
(Italy) AutOrlando Sport	Porsche 718 Cayman GT4 Clubsport	223	(Italy) Emanuele Romani	PA	1, 3
(Italy) AutOrlando Sport	Porsche 718 Cayman GT4 Clubsport	223	(Italy) Gianluca Carboni	PA	1, 3
(Italy) AutOrlando Sport	Porsche 718 Cayman GT4 Clubsport	274	(Italy) Maurizio Fondi	Am	5
(Italy) AutOrlando Sport	Porsche 718 Cayman GT4 Clubsport	274	(Italy) Alessandro Giovannelli	Am	5
(Italy) AutOrlando Sport	Porsche 718 Cayman GT4 Clubsport	274	(Italy) Dario Baruchelli	Am	7
(Italy) AutOrlando Sport	Porsche 718 Cayman GT4 Clubsport	274	(Italy) Maurizio Fratti	Am	7
(Italy) AutOrlando Sport	Porsche 718 Cayman GT4 Clubsport	275	(Italy) Dario Cerati	Am	1, 3, 5, 7
(Italy) AutOrlando Sport	Porsche 718 Cayman GT4 Clubsport	275	(Italy) Giuseppe Ghezzi	Am	1, 3, 5, 7
(Italy) Ebimotors	Porsche 718 Cayman GT4 Clubsport	223	(Italy) Gianluca Carboni	PA	5
(Italy) Ebimotors	Porsche 718 Cayman GT4 Clubsport	223	(Italy) Emanuele Romani	PA	5
(Italy) Ebimotors	Porsche 718 Cayman GT4 Clubsport	251	(Italy) Mattia Di Giusto	PA	1, 3, 5, 7
(Italy) Ebimotors	Porsche 718 Cayman GT4 Clubsport	251	(Italy) Fabio Babini	PA	1
(Italy) Ebimotors	Porsche 718 Cayman GT4 Clubsport	251	(Italy) Riccardo Pera	PA	3, 5, 7
(Italy) Ebimotors	Porsche 718 Cayman GT4 Clubsport	252	(Italy) Sabino De Castro	PA	1, 3
(Italy) Ebimotors	Porsche 718 Cayman GT4 Clubsport	252	(Italy) Matteo Arrigosi	PA	1, 3
(Italy) Ebimotors	Porsche 718 Cayman GT4 Clubsport	252	(Italy) Gianluca Carboni	PA	7
(Italy) Ebimotors	Porsche 718 Cayman GT4 Clubsport	252	(Italy) Emanuele Romani	PA	7
Entry Lists:

Icon	Class
PA	Pro-Am Cup
Am	Am Cup

== Results ==
Bold indicates the overall winner.

Round		Circuit	GT3 Pro Winners	GT3 Pro/Am Winners	GT3 Am Winners	GT Cup Winners	GT4 Pro/Am Winners	GT4 Am
1	R1	Autodromo Nazionale di Monza	(Italy) **No.3 Easy Race**	(Italy) No.58 RAM Autoracing	(Switzerland) No.33 Kessel Racing	(Italy) No.351 Bonaldi Motorsport	(Italy) No.251 Ebimotors	(Italy) No.275 AutOrlando Sport
1	R1	Autodromo Nazionale di Monza	(Italy) **Matteo Greco** (Italy) **Fabrizio Crestani**	(Italy) Alberto Lippi (Italy) Luca Filippi	(Turkey) Murat Cuhadaroglu (Italy) Niccolò Schirò	(Netherlands) Daan Pijl (Italy) Fabio Vairani	(Italy) Mattia Di Giusto (Italy) Fabio Babini	(Italy) Dario Cerati (Italy) Giuseppe Ghezzi
1	R2	Autodromo Nazionale di Monza	(San Marino) No.12 Audi Sport Italia	(San Marino) **No.90 AKM Motorsport**	(Italy) No.77 Nova Race	(Italy) No.355 Easy Race	(Italy) No.251 Ebimotors	(Italy) No.215 Ceccato Racing
1	R2	Autodromo Nazionale di Monza	(Italy) Lorenzo Ferrari (Italy) Riccardo Agostini	(Italy) **Luca Segù** (Israel) **Baruch Bar**	(Italy) Erwin Zanotti	(Italy) Francesca Linossi (Sweden) Daniel Vebster	(Italy) Mattia Di Giusto (Italy) Fabio Babini	(Italy) Nicola Neri (Italy) Giuseppe Fascicolo
2		Autodromo di Pergusa	(San Marino) **No.12 Audi Sport Italia**	(Switzerland) No.11 Kessel Racing	No Entries	(Italy) No.333 SR&R	No Entries	(Italy) No.215 Ceccato Racing
2		Autodromo di Pergusa	(Italy) **Lorenzo Ferrari** (Italy) **Riccardo Agostini** (Italy) **Mattia Drudi**	(United States) Stephen Earle (South Africa) David Perel	No Entries	(Italy) Luca Demarchi (Italy) Nicholas Risato (Italy) Edoardo Barbolini	No Entries	(Italy) Nicola Neri (Italy) Giuseppe Fascicolo (Sweden) Alfred Nilsson
3	R1	Misano World Circuit Marco Simoncelli						
3	R2	Misano World Circuit Marco Simoncelli						
4		Autodromo Internazionale del Mugello						
5	R1	Autodromo Internazionale Enzo e Dino Ferrari						
5	R2	Autodromo Internazionale Enzo e Dino Ferrari						
6		ACI Vallelunga Circuit						
7	R1	Autodromo Internazionale del Mugello						
7	R2	Autodromo Internazionale del Mugello						
8		Autodromo Nazionale di Monza						
Results:
