= 2020 Italian GT Championship =

Motor racing competition

The 2020 Italian GT Championship was the 29th season of the Italian GT Championship, the grand tourer-style sports car racing founded by the Italian automobile club (Automobile Club d'Italia). The Championship consists of four Sprint race events and four Endurance race events. At each Sprint race event there were held two races. The Season started on 19 July at Mugello and ended on 6 December at Vallelunga

== Teams and Drivers ==
=== GT3 ===
Team	Car	No.	Driver	Class	Rounds
(Italy) Easy Race	Ferrari 488 GT3	3	(Singapore) Sean Hudspeth	PA	All
(Italy) Easy Race	Ferrari 488 GT3	3	(Italy) Mattia Michelotto	PA	All
(Italy) Easy Race	Ferrari 488 GT3	3	(Italy) Matteo Greco	PA	1, 3–4, 7
(Italy) BMW Team Italia	BMW M6 GT3	7	(Italy) Stefano Comandini	P	All
(Italy) BMW Team Italia	BMW M6 GT3	7	(Germany) Marius Zug	P	All
(Italy) BMW Team Italia	BMW M6 GT3	7	(United Kingdom) Alexander Sims	P	1, 4
(Italy) BMW Team Italia	BMW M6 GT3	7	(Canada) Bruno Spengler	P	3
(Italy) BMW Team Italia	BMW M6 GT3	7	(Finland) Jesse Krohn	P	7
(San Marino) Audi Sport Italia	Audi R8 LMS Evo	12	(Italy) Riccardo Agostini	P	All
(San Marino) Audi Sport Italia	Audi R8 LMS Evo	12	(Italy) Daniel Mancinelli	P	1–4, 7
(San Marino) Audi Sport Italia	Audi R8 LMS Evo	12	(Italy) Mattia Drudi	P	1, 4–8
(San Marino) Audi Sport Italia	Audi R8 LMS Evo	12	(Italy) Vito Postiglione	P	3
(Italy) Vincenzo Sospiri Racing	Lamborghini Huracán GT3 Evo	19	(Italy) Leonardo Pulcini	P	1, 3–4, 7
(Italy) Vincenzo Sospiri Racing	Lamborghini Huracán GT3 Evo	19	(Italy) Raffaele Giammaria	P	1, 3–4, 7
(Italy) Vincenzo Sospiri Racing	Lamborghini Huracán GT3 Evo	19	(United States) Steven Aghakani	P	1, 3
(Italy) Vincenzo Sospiri Racing	Lamborghini Huracán GT3 Evo	19	(Japan) Yuki Nemoto	P	4, 6–8
(Italy) Vincenzo Sospiri Racing	Lamborghini Huracán GT3 Evo	19	(Finland) Tuomas Tujula	P	6, 8
(Italy) Vincenzo Sospiri Racing	Lamborghini Huracán GT3 Evo	19	(Japan) Yuki Nemoto	PA	2, 5
(Italy) Vincenzo Sospiri Racing	Lamborghini Huracán GT3 Evo	19	(Finland) Tuomas Tujula	PA	2, 5
(Italy) Vincenzo Sospiri Racing	Lamborghini Huracán GT3 Evo	63	(Netherlands) Danny Kroes	P	All
(Italy) Vincenzo Sospiri Racing	Lamborghini Huracán GT3 Evo	63	(Denmark) Frederik Schandorff	P	1, 3–4, 7
(Italy) Vincenzo Sospiri Racing	Lamborghini Huracán GT3 Evo	63	(Finland) Tuomas Tujula	P	1, 3–4, 7
(Italy) Vincenzo Sospiri Racing	Lamborghini Huracán GT3 Evo	63	(Italy) Leonardo Pulcini	P	2, 5–6, 8
(Italy) AF Corse	Ferrari 488 GT3	21	(United States) Simon Mann	PA	1–2, 4–8
(Italy) AF Corse	Ferrari 488 GT3	21	(Italy) Matteo Cressoni	PA	1–3, 5–8
(Italy) AF Corse	Ferrari 488 GT3	21	(United States) Peter Mann	PA	3
(Italy) AF Corse	Ferrari 488 GT3	21	(Italy) Marco Cioci	PA	4
(Italy) AF Corse	Ferrari 488 GT3	21	(Italy) Stefano Gai	PA	4
(Italy) AF Corse	Ferrari 488 GT3	71	(Italy) Giorgio Roda	P	All
(Italy) AF Corse	Ferrari 488 GT3	71	(Italy) Alessio Rovera	P	All
(Italy) AF Corse	Ferrari 488 GT3	71	(Italy) Antonio Fuoco	P	1, 3–4, 7
(Italy) Krypton Motorsport	Mercedes-AMG GT3	22	(Italy) Stefano Pezzucchi	Am	6
(Italy) RS Racing	Ferrari 488 GT3	25	(Italy) Daniele Di Amato	PA	2–8
(Italy) RS Racing	Ferrari 488 GT3	25	(Italy) Alessandro Vezzoni	PA	2–8
(San Marino) AKM Motorsport	Mercedes-AMG GT3	27	(San Marino) Francesca Linossi	PA	1, 3–4, 7
(San Marino) AKM Motorsport	Mercedes-AMG GT3	27	(Italy) Lorenzo Ferrari	PA	1, 3–4
(San Marino) AKM Motorsport	Mercedes-AMG GT3	27	(Italy) Stefano Colombo	PA	1
(San Marino) AKM Motorsport	Mercedes-AMG GT3	27	(Chile) Benjamín Hites	PA	3
(San Marino) AKM Motorsport	Mercedes-AMG GT3	27	(Italy) Daniel Zampieri	PA	7
(San Marino) AKM Motorsport	Mercedes-AMG GT3	27	(Italy) Alessio Lorandi	PA	7
(San Marino) AKM Motorsport	Mercedes-AMG GT3	27	(Italy) Lorenzo Ferrari	P	2, 5–6, 8
(San Marino) AKM Motorsport	Mercedes-AMG GT3	27	(Italy) Daniel Zampieri	P	2
(San Marino) AKM Motorsport	Mercedes-AMG GT3	27	(Italy) Loris Spinelli	P	5–6, 8
(San Marino) AKM Motorsport	Mercedes-AMG GT3	90	(Italy) Loris Spinelli	PA	2, 7
(San Marino) AKM Motorsport	Mercedes-AMG GT3	90	(Italy) Davide Roda	PA	2
(San Marino) AKM Motorsport	Mercedes-AMG GT3	90	(Russia) Alexander Moiseev	PA	7–8
(San Marino) AKM Motorsport	Mercedes-AMG GT3	90	(Italy) Raffaele Marciello	PA	8
(Italy) Imperiale Racing	Lamborghini Huracán GT3 Evo	32	(Italy) Giovanni Venturini	P	All
(Italy) Imperiale Racing	Lamborghini Huracán GT3 Evo	32	(Italy) Kikko Galbiati	P	1–7
(Italy) Imperiale Racing	Lamborghini Huracán GT3 Evo	32	(Italy) Vito Postiglione	P	1
(Italy) Imperiale Racing	Lamborghini Huracán GT3 Evo	32	(Italy) Alex Frassineti	P	3–4, 8
(Italy) Imperiale Racing	Lamborghini Huracán GT3 Evo	32	(Italy) Giacomo Altoè	P	7
(Italy) Ebimotors	Porsche 911 GT3 R	44	(Italy) Paolo Venerosi	PA	1, 3–4
(Italy) Ebimotors	Porsche 911 GT3 R	44	(Italy) Alessandro Baccani	PA	1, 3–4
(Italy) Ebimotors	Porsche 911 GT3 R	44	(Italy) Riccardo Pera	PA	1, 3
(Italy) Ebimotors	Porsche 911 GT3 R	44	(Italy) Matteo Malucelli	PA	4
(Italy) Ebimotors	Porsche 911 GT3 R	44	(Italy) Paolo Venerosi	Am	2, 5–6
(Italy) Ebimotors	Porsche 911 GT3 R	44	(Italy) Alessandro Baccani	Am	2, 5–6
(Germany) Herberth Motorsport	Porsche 911 GT3 R	52	(Germany) Robert Renauer	PA	3
(Germany) Herberth Motorsport	Porsche 911 GT3 R	52	(Switzerland) Daniel Allemann	PA	3
(Germany) Herberth Motorsport	Porsche 911 GT3 R	91	(Germany) Alfred Renauer	PA	3
(Germany) Herberth Motorsport	Porsche 911 GT3 R	91	(Germany) Ralf Bohn	PA	3
(Italy) Dinamic Motorsport	Porsche 911 GT3 R	67	(Switzerland) Roberto Pampanini	PA	7
(Italy) Dinamic Motorsport	Porsche 911 GT3 R	67	(Switzerland) Mauro Calamia	PA	7
(Italy) Dinamic Motorsport	Porsche 911 GT3 R	91	(Italy) Marco Cassarà	Am	2, 5–6
(Italy) Dinamic Motorsport	Porsche 911 GT3 R	91	(Italy) Alex De Giacomi	Am	2, 5–6
(Italy) Dinamic Motorsport	Porsche 911 GT3 R	91	(Italy) Marco Cassarà	PA	8
(Italy) Dinamic Motorsport	Porsche 911 GT3 R	91	(Italy) Matteo Cairoli	PA	8
(Italy) Dinamic Motorsport	Porsche 911 GT3 R	92	(Lebanon) Fadel Habib	Am	5
(Italy) Nova Race	Honda NSX GT3	77	(Italy) Luca Magnoni	PA	8
(Italy) Nova Race	Honda NSX GT3	77	(Italy) Marco Bonanomi	PA	8
(Italy) LP Racing	Lamborghini Huracán GT3 Evo	88	(Italy) Lorenzo Marcucci	PA	2, 5–6
(Italy) LP Racing	Lamborghini Huracán GT3 Evo	88	(Italy) Riccardo Cazzaniga	PA	2, 5
(Italy) LP Racing	Lamborghini Huracán GT3 Evo	88	(Italy) Alex Frassineti	PA	6
(Italy) LP Racing	Lamborghini Huracán GT3 Evo	88	(Italy) Giacomo Altoè	P	8
(Italy) LP Racing	Lamborghini Huracán GT3 Evo	88	(Venezuela) Jonathan Cecotto	P	8

Icon	Class
P	Pro Cup
PA	Pro-Am Cup
Am	Am Cup

=== GT Cup ===
Team	Car	No.	Driver	Rounds
(Italy) Ombra Racing	Porsche 991 GT3 Cup	312	(Italy) Leonardo Caglioni	6
(Italy) Ombra Racing	Porsche 991 GT3 Cup	312	(Switzerland) Adriano Pan	6
(Italy) Duell Race	Porsche 991 GT3 Cup	312	(Italy) Gianluca Carboni	8
(Italy) Duell Race	Porsche 991 GT3 Cup	312	(Italy) Emanuele Romani	8
(Italy) Duell Race	Porsche 991 GT3 Cup	322	(Italy) Vincenzo Sauto	2, 5
(Italy) Duell Race	Porsche 991 GT3 Cup	322	(Italy) Gianluca Carboni	2, 5
(Italy) SR&R	Ferrari 488 Challenge	333	(Italy) Luca Demarchi	2, 5–6
(Italy) SR&R	Ferrari 488 Challenge	333	(Italy) Gian Piero Cristoni	2, 5
(Italy) SR&R	Ferrari 488 Challenge	333	(Italy) Alessandro Berton	6
(Denmark) Formula Racing	Ferrari 488 Challenge	351	(Denmark) Christian Brusborg	8
(Denmark) Formula Racing	Ferrari 488 Challenge	352	(Italy) Alessandro Cozzi	8
(Italy) Easy Race	Ferrari 488 Challenge	355	(Italy) Riccardo Chiesa	2, 5–6, 8
(Italy) Easy Race	Ferrari 488 Challenge	355	(Italy) Matteo Greco	2, 5–6, 8

=== GT4 ===
Team	Car	No.	Driver	Class	Rounds
(Sweden) Primus Racing	Ginetta G55 GT4	201	(Denmark) Peter Larsen	Am	6
(Sweden) Primus Racing	Ginetta G55 GT4	201	(Sweden) Johan Rosen	Am	6
(Italy) Nova Race	Mercedes-AMG GT4	207	(Italy) Alessandro Marchetti	Am	2
(Italy) Nova Race	Mercedes-AMG GT4	207	(Italy) Carlo Mantori	Am	2
(Italy) Nova Race	Mercedes-AMG GT4	207	(Italy) Mario Minella	Am	3–4
(Italy) Nova Race	Mercedes-AMG GT4	207	(Italy) Claudio Formenti	Am	3–4
(Italy) Nova Race	Mercedes-AMG GT4	207	(Italy) Fillippo Manassero	Am	3–4
(Italy) Nova Race	Mercedes-AMG GT4	227	(Italy) Luca Segù	PA	2, 5–6, 8
(Italy) Nova Race	Mercedes-AMG GT4	227	(Italy) Francesco De Luca	PA	2, 5–6, 8
(Italy) Nova Race	Mercedes-AMG GT4	277	(Italy) Luca Magnoni	Am	1–7
(Italy) Nova Race	Mercedes-AMG GT4	277	(Norway) Aleksander Schjerpen	Am	1
(Italy) Nova Race	Mercedes-AMG GT4	277	(Italy) Tobia Zarpellon	Am	3
(Italy) Nova Race	Mercedes-AMG GT4	277	(Italy) Francesco De Luca	Am	4
(Italy) Nova Race	Mercedes-AMG GT4	277	(Italy) Claudio Formenti	Am	7
(Italy) BMW Team Italia	BMW M4 GT4	215	(Italy) Francesco Guerra	PA	1–8
(Italy) BMW Team Italia	BMW M4 GT4	215	(Italy) Simone Riccitelli	PA	1–6, 8
(Italy) BMW Team Italia	BMW M4 GT4	215	(Italy) Nicola Neri	PA	1, 3–4, 7
(Italy) Ebimotors	Porsche 718 Cayman GT4 Clubsport	250	(Italy) Paolo Gnemmi	PA	1–8
(Italy) Ebimotors	Porsche 718 Cayman GT4 Clubsport	250	(Italy) Riccardo Pera	PA	1–3, 5–8
(Italy) Ebimotors	Porsche 718 Cayman GT4 Clubsport	250	(Italy) Sabino De Castro	PA	1, 3–4, 7
(Italy) Ebimotors	Porsche 718 Cayman GT4 Clubsport	250	(Italy) Vito Postiglione	PA	4
(Italy) Ebimotors	Porsche 718 Cayman GT4 Clubsport	251	(Italy) Mattia Di Giusto	Am	5–6, 8
(Italy) Ebimotors	Porsche 718 Cayman GT4 Clubsport	251	(Italy) Alberto De Amicis	Am	5–6
(Italy) Ebimotors	Porsche 718 Cayman GT4 Clubsport	251	(Italy) Gabriele Torelli	Am	8
(Italy) Ebimotors	Porsche 718 Cayman GT4 Clubsport	251	(Italy) Marco Talarico	PA	7
(Italy) Ebimotors	Porsche 718 Cayman GT4 Clubsport	251	(Italy) Alessandro Cutrera	PA	7
(Italy) Ebimotors	Porsche 718 Cayman GT4 Clubsport	251	(Italy) "L.M.D.V"	PA	7
(Italy) Ebimotors	Porsche 718 Cayman GT4 Clubsport	252	(Italy) Andrea Marchi	Am	1, 3–4, 7
(Italy) Ebimotors	Porsche 718 Cayman GT4 Clubsport	252	(Italy) Mattia Di Giusto	Am	1, 3–4, 7
(Italy) Ebimotors	Porsche 718 Cayman GT4 Clubsport	252	(Italy) Gianluigi Piccioli	Am	1
(Italy) Ebimotors	Porsche 718 Cayman GT4 Clubsport	252	(Italy) Alberto De Amicis	Am	3–4, 7
(Italy) Ebimotors	Porsche 718 Cayman GT4 Clubsport	252	(Italy) Gianluigi Piccioli	PA	2, 5–6
(Italy) Ebimotors	Porsche 718 Cayman GT4 Clubsport	252	(Italy) Sabino De Castro	PA	2, 5–6
(San Marino) W&D Racing Team	BMW M4 GT4	271	(San Marino) Paolo Meloni	Am	2, 5–6, 8
(Italy) Scuderia Villorba Corse	Mercedes-AMG GT4	288	(Italy) Andrea Belicchi	PA	2, 5–6, 8
(Italy) Scuderia Villorba Corse	Mercedes-AMG GT4	288	(Italy) Simone Vullo	PA	2, 5–6, 8
(Italy) Cram Motorsport	Porsche 718 Cayman GT4 Clubsport	297	(Switzerland) Adriano Pan	Am	2
(Italy) Cram Motorsport	Porsche 718 Cayman GT4 Clubsport	297	(Italy) Matteo Arrigosi	Am	2
(Italy) Cram Motorsport	Porsche 718 Cayman GT4 Clubsport	297	(Netherlands) Christian De Kant	Am	8
(Italy) Cram Motorsport	Porsche 718 Cayman GT4 Clubsport	297	(Italy) Francesco Fenici	Am	8
(Italy) Cram Motorsport	Porsche 718 Cayman GT4 Clubsport	299	(Australia) Daniel Vebster	Am	2, 5–6, 8
(Italy) Cram Motorsport	Porsche 718 Cayman GT4 Clubsport	299	(Italy) Giacomo Riva	Am	2, 5–6, 8

Icon	Class
PA	Pro-Am Cup
Am	Am Cup

== Race calendar and results ==
All races were held in Italy. Overall winner is Bold.

Round		Circuit	Date	GT3 Pro	GT3 Pro-Am	GT3 Am	GT Cup	GT4 Pro-Am	GT4 Am
1		Mugello Circuit	19 July	(San Marino) No. 12 Audi Sport Italia	(San Marino) No. 27 AKM Motorsport	No Entries		(Italy) No. 250 Ebimotors	(Italy) No. 277 Nova Race
1		Mugello Circuit	19 July	(Italy) Mattia Drudi (Italy) Riccardo Agostini (Italy) Daniel Mancinelli	(San Marino) Francesca Linossi (Italy) Stefano Colombo (Italy) Lorenzo Ferrari	No Entries		(Italy) Paolo Gnemmi (Italy) Sabino De Castro (Italy) Riccardo Pera	(Italy) Luca Magnoni (Norway) Aleksander Schjerpen
2	R1	Misano World Circuit Marco Simoncelli	1 August	(San Marino) No. 12 Audi Sport Italia	(Italy) No. 19 Vincenzo Sospiri Racing	(Italy) No. 91 Dinamic Motorsport	(Italy) No. 322 Duell Race	(Italy) No. 215 BMW Team Italia	(Italy) No. 277 Nova Race
2	R1	Misano World Circuit Marco Simoncelli	1 August	(Italy) Riccardo Agostini (Italy) Daniel Mancinelli	(Japan) Yuki Nemoto (Finland) Tuomas Tujula	(Italy) Marco Cassarà (Italy) Alex De Giacomi	(Italy) Vincenzo Sauto (Italy) Gianluca Carboni	(Italy) Francesco Guerra (Italy) Simone Riccitelli	(Italy) Luca Magnoni
2	R2	Misano World Circuit Marco Simoncelli	2 August	(San Marino) No. 27 AKM Motorsport	(Italy) No. 3 Easy Race	(Italy) No. 91 Dinamic Motorsport	(Italy) No. 355 Easy Race	(Italy) No. 227 Nova Race	(San Marino) No. 271 W&D Racing Team
2	R2	Misano World Circuit Marco Simoncelli	2 August	(Italy) Lorenzo Ferrari (Italy) Daniel Zampieri	(Italy) Mattia Michelotto (Singapore) Sean Hudspeth	(Italy) Marco Cassarà (Italy) Alex De Giacomi	(Italy) Riccardo Chiesa (Italy) Matteo Greco	(Italy) Luca Segù (Italy) Francesco De Luca	(San Marino) Paolo Meloni
3		Imola Circuit	30 August	(Italy) No. 71 AF Corse	(Italy) No. 3 Easy Race	No Entries		(Italy) No. 250 Ebimotors	(Italy) No. 277 Nova Race
3		Imola Circuit	30 August	(Italy) Giorgio Roda (Italy) Alessio Rovera (Italy) Antonio Fuoco	(Italy) Mattia Michelotto (Singapore) Sean Hudspeth (Italy) Matteo Greco	No Entries		(Italy) Paolo Gnemmi (Italy) Sabino De Castro (Italy) Riccardo Pera	(Italy) Luca Magnoni (Italy) Tobia Zarpellon
4		Vallelunga Circuit	20 September	(Italy) No. 32 Imperiale Racing	(Italy) No. 25 RS Racing	No Entries		(Italy) No. 250 Ebimotors	(Italy) No. 277 Nova Race
4		Vallelunga Circuit	20 September	(Italy) Kikko Galbiati (Italy) Giovanni Venturini (Italy) Alex Frassineti	(Italy) Daniele Di Amato (Italy) Alessandro Vezzoni	No Entries		(Italy) Paolo Gnemmi (Italy) Sabino De Castro (Italy) Vito Postiglione	(Italy) Luca Magnoni (Italy) Francesco De Luca
5	R1	Mugello Circuit	3 October	(San Marino) No. 12 Audi Sport Italia	(Italy) No. 19 Vincenzo Sospiri Racing	(Italy) No. 92 Dinamic Motorsport	(Italy) No. 355 Easy Race	(Italy) No. 288 Scuderia Villorba Corse	(Italy) No. 251 Ebimotors
5	R1	Mugello Circuit	3 October	(Italy) Riccardo Agostini (Italy) Mattia Drudi	(Japan) Yuki Nemoto (Finland) Tuomas Tujula	(Lebanon) Fadel Habib	(Italy) Riccardo Chiesa (Italy) Matteo Greco	(Italy) Andrea Belicchi (Italy) Simone Vullo	(Italy) Mattia Di Giusto (Italy) Alberto De Amicis
5	R2	Mugello Circuit	4 October	(San Marino) No. 27 AKM Motorsport	(Italy) No. 19 Vincenzo Sospiri Racing	(Italy) No. 91 Dinamic Motorsport	(Italy) No. 355 Easy Race	(Italy) No. 215 BMW Team Italia	(Italy) No. 299 Cram Motorsport
5	R2	Mugello Circuit	4 October	(Italy) Lorenzo Ferrari (Italy) Loris Spinelli	(Japan) Yuki Nemoto (Finland) Tuomas Tujula	(Italy) Marco Cassarà (Italy) Alex De Giacomi	(Italy) Riccardo Chiesa (Italy) Matteo Greco	(Italy) Francesco Guerra (Italy) Simone Riccitelli	(Australia) Daniel Webster (Italy) Giacomo Riva
6	R1	Autodromo Nazionale di Monza	17 October	(Italy) No. 7 BMW Team Italia	(Italy) No. 19 Vincenzo Sospiri Racing	(Italy) No. 22 Krypton Motorsport	(Italy) No. 355 Easy Race	(Italy) No. 227 Nova Race	(Italy) No. 251 Ebimotors
6	R1	Autodromo Nazionale di Monza	17 October	(Italy) Stefano Comandini (Germany) Marius Zug	(Japan) Yuki Nemoto (Finland) Tuomas Tujula	(Italy) Stefano Pezzucchi	(Italy) Riccardo Chiesa (Italy) Matteo Greco	(Italy) Luca Segù (Italy) Francesco De Luca	(Italy) Mattia Di Giusto (Italy) Alberto De Amicis
6	R2	Autodromo Nazionale di Monza	18 October	(Italy) No.71 AF Corse	(Italy) No.21 AF Corse	(Italy) No. 91 Dinamic Motorsport	(Italy) No. 355 Easy Race	(Italy) No. 215 BMW Team Italia	(Italy) No. 277 Nova Race
6	R2	Autodromo Nazionale di Monza	18 October	(Italy) Giorgio Roda (Italy) Alessio Rovera	(United States) Simon Mann (Italy) Matteo Cressoni	(Italy) Marco Cassarà (Italy) Alex De Giacomi	(Italy) Riccardo Chiesa (Italy) Matteo Greco	(Italy) Francesco Guerra (Italy) Simone Riccitelli	(Italy) Luca Magnoni
7		Autodromo Nazionale di Monza	9 November	(Italy) No.71 AF Corse	(Italy) No. 3 Easy Race	No Entries		(Italy) No. 250 Ebimotors	(Italy) No. 252 Ebimotors
7		Autodromo Nazionale di Monza	9 November	(Italy) Giorgio Roda (Italy) Alessio Rovera (Italy) Antonio Fuoco	(Italy) Mattia Michelotto (Singapore) Sean Hudspeth (Italy) Matteo Greco	No Entries		(Italy) Paolo Gnemmi (Italy) Sabino De Castro (Italy) Riccardo Pera	(Italy) Andrea Marchi (Italy) Mattia Di Giusto (Italy) Alberto De Amicis
8	R1	Vallelunga Circuit	5 December	(Italy) No. 19 Vincenzo Sospiri Racing	(Italy) No. 3 Easy Race	No Entries	(Italy) No. 355 Easy Race	(Italy) No. 227 Nova Race	(Italy) No. 251 Ebimotors
8	R1	Vallelunga Circuit	5 December	(Japan) Yuki Nemoto (Finland) Tuomas Tujula	(Italy) Mattia Michelotto (Singapore) Sean Hudspeth	No Entries	(Italy) Riccardo Chiesa (Italy) Matteo Greco	(Italy) Luca Segù (Italy) Francesco De Luca	(Italy) Mattia Di Giusto (Italy) Gabriele Torelli
8	R2	Vallelunga Circuit	6 December	(Italy) Imperiale Racing	(Italy) No. 21 AF Corse	No Entries	(Italy) No. 355 Easy Race	(Italy) No. 215 BMW Team Italia	(Italy) No. 299 Cram Motorsport
8	R2	Vallelunga Circuit	6 December	(Italy) Alex Frassineti (Italy) Giovanni Venturini	(United States) Simon Mann (Italy) Matteo Cressoni	No Entries	(Italy) Riccardo Chiesa (Italy) Matteo Greco	(Italy) Francesco Guerra (Italy) Simone Riccitelli	(Australia) Daniel Webster (Italy) Giacomo Riva

== Standings ==
=== Endurance Cup ===
Position	1st	2nd	3rd	4th	5th	6th	7th	8th	9th	10th
Points	20	15	12	7	6	5	4	3	2	1

The worst result doesn't count towards the championship.

==== Overall ====
Pos.	Drivers	Team	MUG (Italy)	IMO (Italy)	VAL (Italy)	MON (Italy)	Points
1	(Italy) Antonio Fuoco (Italy) Giorgio Roda (Italy) Alessio Rovera	(Italy) AF Corse	4	1	9	1	47
2	(Italy) Riccardo Agostini (Italy) Daniel Mancinelli	(San Marino) Audi Sport Team Italia	1	7	Ret	2	39
3	(Italy) Kikko Galbiati (Italy) Giovanni Venturini	(Italy) Imperiale Racing	3	Ret	1	5	38
4	(Italy) Mattia Drudi	(San Marino) Audi Sport Team Italia	1		Ret	2	35
5	(Italy) Stefano Comandini (Germany) Marius Zug	(Italy) BMW Team Italia	2	4	3	11	34
6	(Netherlands) Danny Kroes (Denmark) Frederik Schandorff (Finland) Tuomas Tujula	(Italy) Vincenzo Sospiri Racing	5	2	Ret	3	33
7	(United Kingdom) Alexander Sims	(Italy) BMW Team Italia	2		3		27
8	(Italy) Raffaele Giammaria (Italy) Leonardo Pulcini	(Italy) Vincenzo Sospiri Racing	6	6	2	4	27
9	(Italy) Matteo Greco (Singapore) Sean Hudspeth (Italy) Mattia Michelotto	(Italy) Easy Race	9	3	5	6	23
10	(Japan) Yuki Nemoto	(Italy) Vincenzo Sospiri Racing			2	4	22
11	(Italy) Alex Frassineti	(Italy) Imperiale Racing		Ret	1		20
12	(Italy) Vito Postiglione	(Italy) Imperiale Racing (San Marino) Audi Sport Team Italia (Italy) Ebimotors	3	7	10		17
13	(Italy) Daniele Di Amato (Italy) Alessandro Vezzoni	(Italy) RS Racing		5	4	7	17
14	(United States) Steven Aghkani	(Italy) Vincenzo Sospiri Racing	6	6			10
15	(United States) Simon Mann	(Italy) AF Corse	8		6	Ret	8
16	(San Marino) Francesca Linossi	(San Marino) AKM Motorsport	7	16	8	Ret	7
16	(Italy) Lorenzo Ferrari	(San Marino) AKM Motorsport	7	16	8		7
16	(Canada) Bruno Spengler	(Italy) BMW Team Italia		4			7
17	(Italy) Giacomo Altoè	(Italy) Imperiale Racing				5	6
17	(Italy) Alessandro Baccani (Italy) Paolo Venerosi	(Italy) Ebimotors	10	10	7		6
18	(Italy) Marco Cioci (Italy) Stefano Gai	(Italy) AF Corse			6		5
18	(Italy) Riccardo Pera	(Italy) Ebimotors	10	10		8	5
19	(Italy) Stefano Colombo	(San Marino) AKM Motorsport	7				4
19	(Italy) Matteo Malucelli	(Italy) Ebimotors			7		4
20	(Italy) Sabino De Castro (Italy) Paolo Gnemmi	(Italy) Ebimotors	11	12	10	8	4
21	(Germany) Ralf Bohn (Germany) Alfred Renauer	(Germany) Herberth Motorsport		8			3
21	(Italy) Matteo Cressoni	(Italy) AF Corse	8	11		Ret	3
22	(Germany) Robert Renauer (Switzerland) Daniel Alleman	(Germany) Herberth Motorsport		9			2
22	(Italy) Francesco Guerra (Italy) Nicola Neri	(Italy) BMW Team Italia	12	14	Ret	9	2
23	(Italy) "L.M.D.V" (Italy) Akessandro Cutrera (Italy) Marco Talarico	(Italy) Ebimotors				10	1
	(Italy) Luca Magnoni	(Italy) Nova Race	13	13	11	DNS	0
	(United States) Peter Mann	(Italy) AF Corse		11			0
	(Italy) Francesco De Luca	(Italy) Nova Race			11		0
	(Finland) Jesse Krohn	(Italy) BMW Team Italia				11	0
	(Italy) Simone Riccitelli	(Italy) BMW Team Italia	12	14	Ret		0
	(Italy) Mattia Di Giusto (Italy) Andrea Marchi	(Italy) Ebimotors	14	15	12	Ret	0
	(Italy) Alberto De Amicis	(Italy) Ebimotors		15	12	Ret	0
	(Norway) Alexander Schjerpen	(Italy) Nova Race	13				0
	(Italy) Tobia Zarpellon	(Italy) Nova Race		13			0
	(Italy) Claudio Formenti	(Italy) Nova Race		17	13	DNS	0
	(Italy) Mario Minella (Italy) Fillippo Manassero	(Italy) Nova Race		17	13		0
	(Italy) Gianluigi Piccioli	(Italy) Ebimotors	14				0
	(Chile) Benjamín Hites	(San Marino) AKM Motorsport		16			0
	(Russia) Alexander Moiseev (Italy) Loris Spinelli	(San Marino) AKM Motorsport				Ret	0
	(Switzerland) Roberto Pampanini (Switzerland) Mauro Calamia	(Italy) Dinamic Motorsport				Ret	0
	(Italy) Daniel Zampieri (Italy) Alessio Lorandi	(San Marino) AKM Motorsport				Ret	0

Key
Colour	Result
Gold	Race winner
Silver	2nd place
Bronze	3rd place
Green	Points finish
Blue	Non-points finish
Blue	Non-classified finish (NC)
Purple	Did not finish (Ret)
Black	Disqualified (DSQ)
Black	Excluded (EX)
White	Did not start (DNS)
White	Race cancelled (C)
White	Withdrew (WD)
Blank	Did not participate

P – Pole
F – Fastest Lap

==== GT3 Pro-Am ====
Pos.	Drivers	Team	MUG (Italy)	IMO (Italy)	VAL (Italy)	MON (Italy)	Points
1	(Italy) Matteo Greco (Singapore) Sean Hudspeth (Italy) Mattia Michelotto	(Italy) Easy Race	9	3	5	6	55
2	(Italy) Daniele Di Amato (Italy) Alessandro Vezzoni	(Italy) RS Racing		5	4	7	50
3	(San Marino) Francesca Linossi	(San Marino) AKM Motorsport	7	16	8	Ret	31
3	(Italy) Lorenzo Ferrari	(San Marino) AKM Motorsport	7	16	8		31
4	(United States) Simon Mann	(Italy) AF Corse	8		6	Ret	27
5	(Italy) Alessandro Baccani (Italy) Paolo Venerosi	(Italy) Ebimotors	10	10	7		21
6	(Italy) Stefano Colombo	(San Marino) AKM Motorsport	7				20
6	(Italy) Matteo Cressoni	(Italy) AF Corse	8	11		Ret	20
7	(Italy) Riccardo Pera	(Italy) Ebimotors	10	10			13
8	(Italy) Marco Cioci (Italy) Stefano Gai	(Italy) AF Corse			6		12
8	(Germany) Ralf Bohn (Germany) Alfred Renauer	(Germany) Herberth Motorsport		8			12
9	(Italy) Matteo Malucelli	(Italy) Ebimotors			7		8
10	(Germany) Robert Renauer (Switzerland) Daniel Alleman	(Germany) Herberth Motorsport		9			7
11	(United States) Peter Mann	(Italy) AF Corse		11			5
11	(Chile) Benjamin Hites	(San Marino) AKM Motorsport		16			4
	(Russia) Alexander Moiseev (Italy) Loris Spinelli	(San Marino) AKM Motorsport				Ret	0
	(Switzerland) Roberto Pampanini (Switzerland) Mauro Calamia	(Italy) Dinamic Motorsport				Ret	0
	(Italy) Daniel Zampieri (Italy) Alessio Lorandi	(San Marino) AKM Motorsport				Ret	0

Key
Colour	Result
Gold	Race winner
Silver	2nd place
Bronze	3rd place
Green	Points finish
Blue	Non-points finish
Blue	Non-classified finish (NC)
Purple	Did not finish (Ret)
Black	Disqualified (DSQ)
Black	Excluded (EX)
White	Did not start (DNS)
White	Race cancelled (C)
White	Withdrew (WD)
Blank	Did not participate

P – Pole
F – Fastest Lap

==== GT4 Pro-Am ====
Pos.	Drivers	Team	MUG (Italy)	IMO (Italy)	VAL (Italy)	MON (Italy)	Points
1	(Italy) Sabino De Castro (Italy) Paolo Gnemmi	(Italy) Ebimotors	11	12	10	8	60
2	(Italy) Riccardo Pera	(Italy) Ebimotors	11	12		8	60
3	(Italy) Francesco Guerra (Italy) Nicola Neri	(Italy) BMW Team Italia	12	14	Ret	9	45
4	(Italy) Simone Riccitelli	(Italy) BMW Team Italia	12	14	Ret		30
5	(Italy) Vito Postiglione	(Italy) Ebimotors			10		20
6	(Italy) "L.M.D.V" (Italy) Akessandro Cutrera (Italy) Marco Talarico	(Italy) Ebimotors				10	12

Key
Colour	Result
Gold	Race winner
Silver	2nd place
Bronze	3rd place
Green	Points finish
Blue	Non-points finish
Blue	Non-classified finish (NC)
Purple	Did not finish (Ret)
Black	Disqualified (DSQ)
Black	Excluded (EX)
White	Did not start (DNS)
White	Race cancelled (C)
White	Withdrew (WD)
Blank	Did not participate

P – Pole
F – Fastest Lap

==== GT4 Am ====
Pos.	Drivers	Team	MUG (Italy)	IMO (Italy)	VAL (Italy)	MON (Italy)	Points
1	(Italy) Luca Magnoni	(Italy) Nova Race	13	13	11	DNS	60
2	(Italy) Mattia Di Giusto (Italy) Andrea Marchi	(Italy) Ebimotors	14	15	12	Ret	45
3	(Italy) Alberto De Amicis	(Italy) Ebimotors		15	12	Ret	30
4	(Italy) Claudio Formenti	(Italy) Nova Race		17	13	DNS	24
4	(Italy) Mario Minella (Italy) Fillippo Manassero	(Italy) Nova Race		17	13		24
5	(Norway) Alexaner Schjerpen	(Italy) Nova Race	13				20
5	(Italy) Tobia Zarpellon	(Italy) Nova Race		13			20
5	(Italy) Francesco De Luca	(Italy) Nova Race			11		20
6	(Italy) Gianluigi Piccioli	(Italy) Ebimotors	14				15

Key
Colour	Result
Gold	Race winner
Silver	2nd place
Bronze	3rd place
Green	Points finish
Blue	Non-points finish
Blue	Non-classified finish (NC)
Purple	Did not finish (Ret)
Black	Disqualified (DSQ)
Black	Excluded (EX)
White	Did not start (DNS)
White	Race cancelled (C)
White	Withdrew (WD)
Blank	Did not participate

P – Pole
F – Fastest Lap

=== Sprint ===
Position	1st	2nd	3rd	4th	5th	6th	7th	8th	9th	10th
Points	20	15	12	7	6	5	4	3	2	1

The worst two results don't count towards the championship.

==== Overall ====
Pos.	Drivers	Team	MIS (Italy)		MUG (Italy)		MON (Italy)		VAL (Italy)		Points
Pos.	Drivers	Team	R1	R2	R1	R2	R1	R2	R1	R2	Points
1	(Japan) Yuki Nemoto (Finland) Tuomas Tujula	(Italy) Vincenzo Sospiri Racing	3	Ret	2	6	2	7	1	25	76
2	(Italy) Riccardo Agostini	(San Marino) Audi Sport Italia	1	3	1	7	3	2	8	5	72
3	(Netherlands) Danny Kroes (Italy) Leonardo Pulcini	(Italy) Vincenzo Sospiri Racing	5	23	3	3	6	4	2	2	70
4	(Italy) Giorgio Roda (Italy) Alessio Rovera	(Italy) AF Corse	4	2	8	4	5	1	14	4	62
5	(Italy) Lorenzo Ferrari	(San Marino) AKM Motorsport	24	1	4	1	7	11	24	6	61
6	(Italy) Stefano Comandini (Germany) Marius Zug	(Italy) BMW Team Italia	2	4	23	5	1	21	3	13	60
7	(Italy) Giovanni Venturini	(Italy) Imperiale Racing	6	7	5	2	4	Ret	6	1	58
8	(Italy) Mattia Drudi	(San Marino) Audi Sport Team Italia			1	7	3	2	8	5	47
9	(Italy) Loris Spinelli	(San Marino) AKM Motorsport	14	22	4	1	7	11	24	6	41
10	(Italy) Kikko Galbiati	(Italy) Imperiale Racing	6	7	5	2	4	Ret			37
11	(Italy) Daniel Mancinelli	(San Marino) Audi Sport Italia	1	3							32
12	(United States) Simon Mann (Italy) Matteo Cressoni	(Italy) AF Corse	7	8	6	9	10	3	Ret	7	29
13	(Singapore) Sean Hudspeth (Italy) Mattia Michelotto	(Italy) Easy Race	8	5	7	11	Ret	5	4	8	29
14	(Italy) Alex Frassineti	(Italy) LP Racing (Italy) Imperiale Racing					9	Ret	6	1	27
15	(Italy) Daniel Zampieri	(San Marino) AKM Motorsport	24	1							20
16	(Italy) Giacomo Altoè (Venezuela) Jonathan Cecotto	(Italy) LP Racing							5	3	18
17	(Italy) Daniele Di Amato (Italy) Alessandro Vezzoni	(Italy) RS Racing	10	6	10	8	8	6	11	Ret	17
18	(Italy) Marco Cassarà	(Italy) Dinamic Motorsport	11	9	12	12	25	8	7	15	9
19	(Italy) Lorenzo Marcucci	(Italy) LP Racing	9	Ret	9	10	9	Ret			6
20	(Italy) Alex De Giacomi	(Italy) Dinamic Motorsport	11	9	12	12	25	8			5
21	(Italy) Matteo Cairoli	(Italy) Dinamic Motorsport							7	15	4
22	(Italy) Raffaele Marciello (Russia) Alexander Moiseev	(San Marino) AKM Motorsport							9	9	4
23	(Italy) Riccardo Cazzaniga	(Italy) LP Racing	9	Ret	9	10					4
24	(Italy) Alessandro Baccani (Italy) Paolo Venerosi	(Italy) Ebimotors	12	10	Ret	DNS	13	9			3
25	(Italy) Francesco Guerra (Italy) Simone Riccitelli	(Italy) BMW Team Italia	15	Ret	19	16	18	12	23	10	1
25	(Italy) Luca Magnoni	(Italy) Nova Race	19	19	25	24	22	17	10	12	1
25	(Italy) Marco Bonanomi	(Italy) Nova Race							10	12	1
25	(Italy) Riccardo Chiesa (Italy) Matteo Greco	(Italy) Easy Race	17	11	13	13	12	10	12	11	1
	(Lebanon) Habib Fadel	(Italy) Dinamic Motorsport			11	14					0
	(Italy) Stefano Pezzucchi	(Italy) Krypton Motorsport					11	Ret			0
	(Italy) Luca Demarchi	(Italy) SR&R	Ret	12	17	15	14	22			0
	(Italy) Gian Piero Cristoni	(Italy) SR&R	Ret	12	17	15					0
	(Italy) Gianluca Carboni	(Italy) Duell Race	13	Ret	18	Ret			13	21	0
	(Italy) Vincenzo Sauto	(Italy) Duell Race	13	Ret	18	Ret					0
	(Italy) Luca Segù (Italy) Francesco De Luca	(Italy) Nova Race	16	13	22	18	15	14	17	18	0
	(Italy) Andrea Belicchi (Italy) Simone Vullo	(Italy) Scuderia Villorba Corse	23	15	15	17	16	13	Ret	17	0
	(Italy) Emanuele Romani	(Italy) Duell Race							13	21	0
	(Italy) Davide Roda	(San Marino) AKM Motorsport	14	22							0
	(Italy) Paolo Gnemmi (Italy) Riccardo Pera	(Italy) Ebimotors	18	14	16	19	17	15	20	14	0
	(Italy) Mattia Di Giusto	(Italy) Ebimotors			14	22	20	23	18	23	0
	(Italy) Alberto De Amicis	(Italy) Ebimotors			14	22	20	23			0
	(Italy) Alessandro Berton	(Italy) SR&R					14	22			0
	(Italy) Alessandro Cozzi	(Denmark) Formula Racing							15	25	0
	(Italy) Gianluigi Piccioli (Italy) Sabino De Castro	(Italy) Ebimotors	20	16	20	20	19	16			0
	(Denmark) Christian Brusborg	(Denmark) Formula Racing							16	16	0
	(San Marino) Paolo Meloni	(San Marino) W&D Racing Team	22	17	24	23	23	18	21	20	0
	(Switzerland) Ariano Pan	(Italy) Cram Motorsport (Italy) Ombra Racing	Ret	18	DNS	DNS	DNS	DNS			0
	(Italy) Matteo Arrigosi	(Italy) Cram Motorsport	Ret	18							0
	(Italy) Gabriele Torelli	(Italy) Ebimotors							18	23	0
	(Australia) Daniel Webster (Italy) Giacomo Riva	(Italy) Cram Motorsport	21	20	21	21	21	19	22	19	0
	(Netherlands) Christian de Kant	(Italy) Cram Motorsport			DNS	DNS			19	22	0
	(Italy) Francesco Fenici	(Italy) Cram Motorsport							19	22	0
	(Denmark) Peter Larsen (Sweden) Johan Rosen	(Sweden) Primus Racing					24	20			0
	(Italy) Alessandro Marchetti (Italy) Carlo Mantori	(Italy) Nova Race	Ret	21							0
	(Italy) Leonardo Caglioni	(Italy) Ombra Racing					DNS	DNS			0

Key
Colour	Result
Gold	Race winner
Silver	2nd place
Bronze	3rd place
Green	Points finish
Blue	Non-points finish
Blue	Non-classified finish (NC)
Purple	Did not finish (Ret)
Black	Disqualified (DSQ)
Black	Excluded (EX)
White	Did not start (DNS)
White	Race cancelled (C)
White	Withdrew (WD)
Blank	Did not participate

P – Pole
F – Fastest Lap

==== GT3 Pro-Am ====
Pos.	Drivers	Team	MIS (Italy)		MUG (Italy)		MON (Italy)		VAL (Italy)		Points
Pos.	Drivers	Team	R1	R2	R1	R2	R1	R2	R1	R2	Points
1	(United States) Simon Mann (Italy) Matteo Cressoni	(Italy) AF Corse	7	8	6	9	10	3	Ret	7	94
2	(Singapore) Sean Hudspeth (Italy) Mattia Michelotto	(Italy) Easy Race	8	5	7	11	Ret	5	4	8	94
3	(Italy) Daniele Di Amato (Italy) Alessandro Vezzoni	(Italy) RS Racing	10	6	10	8	8	6	11	Ret	74
4	(Japan) Yuki Nemoto (Finland) Tuomas Tujula	(Italy) Vincenzo Sospiri Racing	3	Ret	2	6					60
5	(Italy) Lorenzo Marcucci	(Italy) LP Racing	9	Ret	9	10	9	Ret			36
6	(Italy) Raffaele Marciello (Russia) Alexander Moiseev	(San Marino) AKM Motorsport							9	9	24
7	(Italy) Riccardo Cazzaniga	(Italy) LP Racing	9	Ret	9	10					21
8	(Italy) Matteo Cairoli (Italy) Marco Cassarà	(Italy) Dinamic Motorsport							7	15	21
9	(Italy) Alex Frassineti	(Italy) LP Racing					9	Ret			15
10	(Italy) Marco Bonanomi (Italy) Luca Magnoni	(Italy) Nova Race							10	12	14
11	(Italy) Davide Roda (Italy) Loris Spinelli	(San Marino) AKM Motorsport	14	22							12

Key
Colour	Result
Gold	Race winner
Silver	2nd place
Bronze	3rd place
Green	Points finish
Blue	Non-points finish
Blue	Non-classified finish (NC)
Purple	Did not finish (Ret)
Black	Disqualified (DSQ)
Black	Excluded (EX)
White	Did not start (DNS)
White	Race cancelled (C)
White	Withdrew (WD)
Blank	Did not participate

P – Pole
F – Fastest Lap

==== GT3 Am ====
Pos.	Drivers	Team	MIS (Italy)		MUG (Italy)		MON (Italy)		VAL (Italy)		Points
Pos.	Drivers	Team	R1	R2	R1	R2	R1	R2	R1	R2	Points
1	(Italy) Alex De Giacomi (Italy) Marco Cassarà	(Italy) Dinamic Motorsport	11	9	12	12	25	8			107
2	(Italy) Alessandro Baccani (Italy) Paolo Venerosi	(Italy) Ebimotors	12	10	Ret	DNS	13	9			60
3	(Lebanon) Habib Fadel	(Italy) Dinamic Motorsport			11	14					35
	(Italy) Stefano Pezzucchi	(Italy) Krypton Motorsport					11	Ret			20

Key
Colour	Result
Gold	Race winner
Silver	2nd place
Bronze	3rd place
Green	Points finish
Blue	Non-points finish
Blue	Non-classified finish (NC)
Purple	Did not finish (Ret)
Black	Disqualified (DSQ)
Black	Excluded (EX)
White	Did not start (DNS)
White	Race cancelled (C)
White	Withdrew (WD)
Blank	Did not participate

P – Pole
F – Fastest Lap

==== GT Cup ====
Pos.	Drivers	Team	MIS (Italy)		MUG (Italy)		MON (Italy)		VAL (Italy)		Points
Pos.	Drivers	Team	R1	R2	R1	R2	R1	R2	R1	R2	Points
1	(Italy) Riccardo Chiesa (Italy) Matteo Greco	(Italy) Easy Race	17	11	13	13	12	10	12	11	120
2	(Italy) Luca Demarchi	(Italy) SR&R	Ret	12	17	15	14	22			75
3	(Italy) Gianluca Carboni	(Italy) Duell Race	13	Ret	18	Ret			13	21	59
4	(Italy) Gian Piero Cristoni	(Italy) SR&R	Ret	12	17	15					45
5	(Italy) Vincenzo Sauto	(Italy) Duell Race	13	Ret	18	Ret					32
6	(Italy) Alessandro Berton	(Italy) SR&R					14	22			30
7	(Italy) Emanuele Romani	(Italy) Duell Race							13	21	27
8	(Denmark) Christian Brusborg	(Denmark) Formula Racing							16	16	22
9	(Italy) Alessandro Cozzi	(Denmark) Formula Racing							15	25	19
	(Italy) Leonardo Caglioni (Switzerland) Ariano Pan	(Italy) Ombra Racing					DNS	DNS			0

Key
Colour	Result
Gold	Race winner
Silver	2nd place
Bronze	3rd place
Green	Points finish
Blue	Non-points finish
Blue	Non-classified finish (NC)
Purple	Did not finish (Ret)
Black	Disqualified (DSQ)
Black	Excluded (EX)
White	Did not start (DNS)
White	Race cancelled (C)
White	Withdrew (WD)
Blank	Did not participate

P – Pole
F – Fastest Lap

==== GT4 Pro-Am ====
Pos.	Drivers	Team	MIS (Italy)		MUG (Italy)		MON (Italy)		VAL (Italy)		Points
Pos.	Drivers	Team	R1	R2	R1	R2	R1	R2	R1	R2	Points
1	(Italy) Francesco Guerra (Italy) Simone Riccitelli	(Italy) BMW Team Italia	15	Ret	19	16	18	12	23	10	104
2	(Italy) Luca Segù (Italy) Francesco De Luca	(Italy) Nova Race	16	13	22	18	15	14	17	18	99
3	(Italy) Andrea Belicchi (Italy) Simone Vullo	(Italy) Scuderia Villorba Corse	23	15	15	17	16	13	Ret	17	89
4	(Italy) Paolo Gnemmi (Italy) Riccardo Pera	(Italy) Ebimotors	18	14	16	19	17	15	20	14	84
5	(Italy) Gianluigi Piccioli (Italy) Sabino De Castro	(Italy) Ebimotors	20	16	20	20	19	16			39

Key
Colour	Result
Gold	Race winner
Silver	2nd place
Bronze	3rd place
Green	Points finish
Blue	Non-points finish
Blue	Non-classified finish (NC)
Purple	Did not finish (Ret)
Black	Disqualified (DSQ)
Black	Excluded (EX)
White	Did not start (DNS)
White	Race cancelled (C)
White	Withdrew (WD)
Blank	Did not participate

P – Pole
F – Fastest Lap

==== GT4 Am ====
Pos.	Drivers	Team	MIS (Italy)		MUG (Italy)		MON (Italy)		VAL (Italy)		Points
Pos.	Drivers	Team	R1	R2	R1	R2	R1	R2	R1	R2	Points
1	(Australia) Daniel Webster (Italy) Giacomo Riva	(Italy) Cram Motorsport	21	20	21	21	21	19	22	19	97
2	(Italy) Mattia Di Giusto	(Italy) Ebimotors			14	22	20	23	18	23	88
3	(San Marino) Paolo Meloni	(San Marino) W&D Racing Team	22	17	24	23	23	18	21	20	86
4	(Italy) Luca Magnoni	(Italy) Nova Race	19	19	25	24	22	17			78
5	(Italy) Alberto De Amicis	(Italy) Ebimotors			14	22	20	23			61
6	(Italy) Gabriele Torelli	(Italy) Ebimotors							18	23	27
7	(Netherlands) Christian de Kant	(Italy) Cram Motorsport			DNS	DNS			19	22	27
7	(Italy) Francesco Fenici	(Italy) Cram Motorsport							19	22	27
8	(Switzerland) Ariano Pan	(Italy) Cram Motorsport (Italy) Ombra Racing	Ret	18	DNS	DNS					15
8	(Italy) Matteo Arrigosi	(Italy) Cram Motorsport	Ret	18							15
9	(Denmark) Peter Larsen (Sweden) Johan Rosen	(Sweden) Primus Racing					24	20			13
10	(Italy) Alessandro Marchetti (Italy) Carlo Mantori	(Italy) Nova Race	Ret	21							6

Key
Colour	Result
Gold	Race winner
Silver	2nd place
Bronze	3rd place
Green	Points finish
Blue	Non-points finish
Blue	Non-classified finish (NC)
Purple	Did not finish (Ret)
Black	Disqualified (DSQ)
Black	Excluded (EX)
White	Did not start (DNS)
White	Race cancelled (C)
White	Withdrew (WD)
Blank	Did not participate

P – Pole
F – Fastest Lap
