= 2024 Italian GT Championship Endurance Cup =

The 2024 Italian GT Championship Endurance Cup was the thirty-third season of the Italian GT Championship. The season began on 2 May at Misano World Circuit Marco Simoncelli and finished on 14 September at Autodromo Internazionale del Mugello. The races are contested with GT3-spec cars, and GT Cup-spec cars. New for 2024 was the separation of the GT Cup field into two different divisions, Division 1 for Ferrari Challenge and Lamborghini Super Trofeo cars and Division 2 for Porsche Carrera Cup Cars.

== Calendar ==
Round	Circuit	Date	Map
1	ACI Vallelunga Circuit, Campagnano di Roma, Rome	14–16 June	2024 Italian GT Championship Endurance Cup is located in Italy
2	Autodromo Internazionale del Mugello, Mugello, Tuscany	12–14 July	2024 Italian GT Championship Endurance Cup is located in Italy
3	Autodromo Internazionale Enzo e Dino Ferrari, Imola, Emilia-Romagna	6–8 September	2024 Italian GT Championship Endurance Cup is located in Italy
4	Autodromo Nazionale Monza, Monza, Lombardy	25–27 October	2024 Italian GT Championship Endurance Cup is located in Italy

== Entry list ==
Team	Car	No.	Drivers	Class	Rounds
GT3
(Italy) Pellin Racing	Ferrari 488 GT3 Evo 2020	3	(United States) Thor Haugen	PA	2
(Italy) Pellin Racing	Ferrari 488 GT3 Evo 2020	3	(Italy) Paolo Ruberti	PA	2
(Italy) Lazarus Corse	Aston Martin Vantage AMR GT3	5	(Finland) William Alatalo	P	1–3
(Italy) Lazarus Corse	Aston Martin Vantage AMR GT3	5	(Spain) Jorge Lorenzo	P	1–3
(Italy) Lazarus Corse	Aston Martin Vantage AMR GT3	5	(India) Mahaveer Raghunathan	P	1–2
(Italy) Lazarus Corse	Aston Martin Vantage AMR GT3	5	(Italy) Mattia di Giusto	P	3
(Italy) BMW Italia Ceccato Racing	BMW M4 GT3	7	(Italy) Stefano Comandini	P	All
(Italy) BMW Italia Ceccato Racing	BMW M4 GT3	7	(United States) Phillippe Denes	P	All
(Italy) BMW Italia Ceccato Racing	BMW M4 GT3	7	(Italy) Francesco Guerra	P	All
(Italy) BMW Italia Ceccato Racing	BMW M4 GT3	8	(Italy) Marco Cassarà	PA	All
(Italy) BMW Italia Ceccato Racing	BMW M4 GT3	8	(Italy) Francesco de Luca	PA	All
(Italy) BMW Italia Ceccato Racing	BMW M4 GT3	8	(Sweden) Alfred Nilsson	PA	All
(Germany) Tresor Attempto Racing	Audi R8 LMS Evo II	11	Andrey Mukovoz (Note: Mukovoz is Russian, but they compete as neutral competitors as Russian national emblems were banned by the FIA following the Russian invasion of Ukraine.)	Am	3
(Germany) Tresor Attempto Racing	Audi R8 LMS Evo II	11	(Italy) Lorenzo Patrese	Am	3
(Germany) Tresor Attempto Racing	Audi R8 LMS Evo II	11	(Germany) Florian Scholze	Am	3
(San Marino) Tresor Audi Sport Italia	Audi R8 LMS Evo II	12	(Germany) Alex Aka	P	All
(San Marino) Tresor Audi Sport Italia	Audi R8 LMS Evo II	12	(Italy) Pietro Delli Guanti	P	All
(San Marino) Tresor Audi Sport Italia	Audi R8 LMS Evo II	12	(Italy) Rocco Mazzola	P	All
(San Marino) Tresor Audi Sport Italia	Audi R8 LMS Evo II	99	(Italy) Andrea Cola	P	All
(San Marino) Tresor Audi Sport Italia	Audi R8 LMS Evo II	99	(Italy) Leonardo Moncini	P	All
(San Marino) Tresor Audi Sport Italia	Audi R8 LMS Evo II	99	(Netherlands) Glenn van Berlo	P	All
(San Marino) AKM Motorsport	Mercedes-AMG GT3 Evo	16	(Italy) Gustavo Sandrucci	PA	All
(San Marino) AKM Motorsport	Mercedes-AMG GT3 Evo	16	(Italy) Filippo Bencivenni	PA	1–3
(San Marino) AKM Motorsport	Mercedes-AMG GT3 Evo	16	(Italy) Lorenzo Ferrari	PA	1–3
(San Marino) AKM Motorsport	Mercedes-AMG GT3 Evo	16	(United States) Cambiz Aliabadi	PA	4
(San Marino) AKM Motorsport	Mercedes-AMG GT3 Evo	16	(Sweden) Oliver Söderström	PA	4
(Italy) EF Racing	Porsche 911 GT3 R (992)	17	(Italy) Enrico Fulgenzi	P	1–2
(Italy) EF Racing	Porsche 911 GT3 R (992)	17	(Italy) Kikko Galbiati	P	1–2
(Italy) EF Racing	Porsche 911 GT3 R (992)	17	(Italy) William Mezzetti	PA	3
(Italy) EF Racing	Porsche 911 GT3 R (992)	17	(Italy) Enrico Fulgenzi	PA	3
(Italy) Vincenzo Sospiri Racing	Lamborghini Huracán GT3 Evo 2	19	(Italy) Riccardo Cazzaniga	P	All
(Italy) Vincenzo Sospiri Racing	Lamborghini Huracán GT3 Evo 2	19	(Italy) Alberto Di Folco	P	All
(Italy) Vincenzo Sospiri Racing	Lamborghini Huracán GT3 Evo 2	19	(Italy) Edoardo Liberati	P	All
(Italy) Vincenzo Sospiri Racing	Lamborghini Huracán GT3 Evo 2	63	(Italy) Jacopo Guidetti	PA	All
(Italy) Vincenzo Sospiri Racing	Lamborghini Huracán GT3 Evo 2	63	(Belgium) Baptiste Moulin	PA	All
(Italy) Vincenzo Sospiri Racing	Lamborghini Huracán GT3 Evo 2	63	(France) Stephane Tribaudini	PA	All
(Italy) Vincenzo Sospiri Racing	Lamborghini Huracán GT3 Evo 2	66	(Belgium) Gilles Stadsbader	PA	All
(Italy) Vincenzo Sospiri Racing	Lamborghini Huracán GT3 Evo 2	66	(Italy) Mattia Michelotto	PA	2–4
(Italy) Vincenzo Sospiri Racing	Lamborghini Huracán GT3 Evo 2	66	(Italy) Ignazio Zanon	PA	3–4
(Italy) Vincenzo Sospiri Racing	Lamborghini Huracán GT3 Evo 2	66	(Italy) Alessandro Fabi	PA	1
(Italy) Vincenzo Sospiri Racing	Lamborghini Huracán GT3 Evo 2	66	(Italy) Stefano Costantini	PA	2
(Italy) Scuderia Baldini	Ferrari 296 GT3	27	(Italy) Giancarlo Fisichella	P	All
(Italy) Scuderia Baldini	Ferrari 296 GT3	27	(Monaco) Arthur Leclerc	P	All
(Italy) Scuderia Baldini	Ferrari 296 GT3	27	(Italy) Tommaso Mosca	P	All
(Italy) Nova Race	Mercedes-AMG GT3 Evo	28	(Italy) Andrea Bodellini	Am	All
(Italy) Nova Race	Mercedes-AMG GT3 Evo	28	(Italy) Fulvio Ferri	Am	All
(Italy) Nova Race	Mercedes-AMG GT3 Evo	28	(Italy) Alessandro Marchetti	Am	All
(Italy) Nova Race	Honda NSX GT3 Evo22	55	(Italy) Felice Jelmini	PA	1–2
(Italy) Nova Race	Honda NSX GT3 Evo22	55	(Italy) Vincenzo Scarpetta	PA	1–2
(Italy) Nova Race	Honda NSX GT3 Evo22	55	(Italy) Marco Butti	PA	1
(Italy) Nova Race	Honda NSX GT3 Evo22	55	(Italy) Filippo Berto	PA	2
(Italy) Nova Race	Honda NSX GT3 Evo22	55	(Italy) Alex Frassineti	P	3–4
(Italy) Nova Race	Honda NSX GT3 Evo22	55	(Italy) Felice Jelmini	P	3–4
(Italy) Nova Race	Honda NSX GT3 Evo22	55	(Italy) Kikko Galbiati	P	4
(Italy) Nova Race	Honda NSX GT3 Evo22	77	(Italy) Massimo Ciglia	Am	All
(Italy) Nova Race	Honda NSX GT3 Evo22	77	(Italy) Luca Magnoni	Am	All
(Italy) Nova Race	Honda NSX GT3 Evo22	77	(Italy) Rodolfo Massaro	Am	All
(Italy) Auto Sport Racing	Lamborghini Huracán GT3 Evo 2	32	(Thailand) Nuttapong Lertlamprasertkul	Am	All
(Italy) Auto Sport Racing	Lamborghini Huracán GT3 Evo 2	32	(Thailand) Aniwat Lommahadthai	Am	All
(Italy) Auto Sport Racing	Lamborghini Huracán GT3 Evo 2	32	(Croatia) Sandro Mur	Am	All
(Italy) Auto Sport Racing	Lamborghini Huracán GT3 Evo 2	33	(Thailand) Sanporn Jao-Javanil	Am	All
(Italy) Auto Sport Racing	Lamborghini Huracán GT3 Evo 2	33	(Serbia) Miloš Pavlović	Am	All
(Italy) Auto Sport Racing	Lamborghini Huracán GT3 Evo 2	33	(Germany) Florian Spengler	Am	All
(Italy) AF Corse	Ferrari 296 GT3	50	(Italy) Stefano Gai	PA	All
(Italy) AF Corse	Ferrari 296 GT3	50	(Denmark) Mikkel Mac	PA	All
(Italy) AF Corse	Ferrari 296 GT3	50	(Italy) Riccardo Ponzio	PA	All
(Italy) AF Corse	Ferrari 488 GT3 Evo 2020	51	(Italy) Alessandro Bracalente	PA	All
(Italy) AF Corse	Ferrari 488 GT3 Evo 2020	51	(Italy) Eliseo Donno	PA	All
(Italy) Imperiale Racing	Lamborghini Huracán GT3 Evo 2	54	(Belize) Alexander Robert Bowen	Am	1, 3–4
(Italy) Imperiale Racing	Lamborghini Huracán GT3 Evo 2	54	(Italy) Giuseppe Fascicolo	Am	1, 3–4
(Italy) Imperiale Racing	Lamborghini Huracán GT3 Evo 2	54	(Kyrgyzstan) Dmitry Gvazava	Am	2–4
(Italy) Imperiale Racing	Lamborghini Huracán GT3 Evo 2	54	(United States) Aaron Farhadi	Am	1
(Italy) Imperiale Racing	Lamborghini Huracán GT3 Evo 2	85	(Italy) Alessio Deledda	PA	1–2, 4
(Italy) Imperiale Racing	Lamborghini Huracán GT3 Evo 2	85	(Switzerland) Kevin Gilardoni	PA	1–2, 4
(Italy) Imperiale Racing	Lamborghini Huracán GT3 Evo 2	85	(Poland) Robin Rogalski	PA	1–2
(Italy) Imperiale Racing	Lamborghini Huracán GT3 Evo 2	85	(Belgium) Ugo de Wilde	PA	4
(Italy) Double TT Racing	Ferrari 488 GT3 Evo 2020	75	(Italy) Leonardo Colavita	Am	All
(Italy) Double TT Racing	Ferrari 488 GT3 Evo 2020	75	(Italy) Simone Riccitelli	Am	All
(Italy) Double TT Racing	Ferrari 488 GT3 Evo 2020	75	(Switzerland) Christoph Ulrich	Am	All
GT Cup
(Italy) Easy Race	Ferrari 488 Challenge Evo	103	(Italy) Francesco La Mazza	PA	All
(Italy) Easy Race	Ferrari 488 Challenge Evo	103	(Italy) Emma Segattini	PA	3–4
(Italy) Easy Race	Ferrari 488 Challenge Evo	103	(Italy) Alex Bacci	PA	1–2
(Italy) Easy Race	Ferrari 488 Challenge Evo	103	(Italy) Emiliano Pierantoni	PA	1
(Italy) Easy Race	Ferrari 488 Challenge Evo	103	(Italy) Lorenzo Bontempelli	PA	2
(Italy) Easy Race	Ferrari 488 Challenge Evo	103	(Italy) Jody Lambrughi	PA	3
(Italy) Easy Race	Ferrari 488 Challenge Evo	103	(Italy) Vito Postiglione	PA	4
(Italy) Best Lap	Ferrari 488 Challenge Evo	111	(Italy) Luca Demarchi	PA	All
(Italy) Best Lap	Ferrari 488 Challenge Evo	111	(Italy) Sabatino Di Mare	PA	All
(Italy) Best Lap	Ferrari 488 Challenge Evo	111	(Italy) Simone Patrinicola	PA	All
(Italy) Best Lap	Ferrari 488 Challenge Evo	212	(Italy) Pietro Agoglia	Am	All
(Italy) Best Lap	Ferrari 488 Challenge Evo	212	(Italy) Filippo Croccolino	Am	2–4
(Italy) Best Lap	Ferrari 488 Challenge Evo	212	(Italy) Giammarco Marzialetti	Am	1–3
(Italy) Best Lap	Ferrari 488 Challenge Evo	212	(Italy) Vito Postiglione	Am	1
(Italy) Best Lap	Ferrari 488 Challenge Evo	212	(Italy) Gianluca Carboni	Am	4
(Italy) EF Racing	Porsche 992 GT3 Cup	117	(Italy) William Mezzetti	PA	4
(Italy) EF Racing	Porsche 992 GT3 Cup	117	(Italy) Vittoria Piria	PA	4
(Italy) Ebimotors	Porsche 992 GT3 Cup	122	(Italy) Daniele Cazzaniga	PA	All
(Italy) Ebimotors	Porsche 992 GT3 Cup	122	(Italy) Davide di Benedetto	PA	All
(Italy) Ebimotors	Porsche 992 GT3 Cup	122	(Italy) Giuseppe Nicolosi	PA	All
(Italy) Racevent	Porsche 992 GT3 Cup	127	(Italy) Giovanni Berton	PA	1–3
(Italy) Racevent	Porsche 992 GT3 Cup	127	(Italy) Ludovico Laurini	PA	1–3
(Italy) Racevent	Porsche 992 GT3 Cup	127	(Italy) Constantino Peroni	PA	1–3
(Italy) Racevent	Porsche 992 GT3 Cup	127	(Italy) Paolo Calcagno	PA	4
(Italy) Racevent	Porsche 992 GT3 Cup	127	(Italy) Jenny Sonzogni	PA	4
(Italy) Racevent	Porsche 992 GT3 Cup	127	(Italy) Ronnie Valori	PA	4
(Italy) DL Racing	Lamborghini Huracán Super Trofeo Evo 2	162	(Egypt) Ibrahim Badawy	PA	2
(Italy) DL Racing	Lamborghini Huracán Super Trofeo Evo 2	162	(Italy) Diego di Fabio	PA	2
(Italy) DL Racing	Lamborghini Huracán Super Trofeo Evo 2	162	(Portugal) Rodrigo Testa	PA	2
(Italy) DL Racing	Lamborghini Huracán Super Trofeo Evo 2	172	(Italy) Alessio Caiola	PA	All
(Italy) DL Racing	Lamborghini Huracán Super Trofeo Evo 2	172	(Italy) Luca Segù	PA	All
(Italy) DL Racing	Lamborghini Huracán Super Trofeo Evo 2	172	(Italy) Andrea Fontana	PA	2–4
(Italy) DL Racing	Lamborghini Huracán Super Trofeo Evo 2	272	(Italy) Alessandro Mainetti	Am	All
(Italy) DL Racing	Lamborghini Huracán Super Trofeo Evo 2	272	(Italy) Giacomo Riva	Am	All
(Italy) DL Racing	Lamborghini Huracán Super Trofeo Evo 2	272	(Italy) Stefano Gattuso	Am	1–3
(Italy) DL Racing	Lamborghini Huracán Super Trofeo Evo 2	272	(Portugal) Rodrigo Testa	Am	4
(Italy) Double TT Racing	Ferrari 488 Challenge Evo	177	(Belgium) Gilles Renmans	Am	4
(Italy) Double TT Racing	Ferrari 488 Challenge Evo	177	(Italy) Vincenzo Scarpetta	Am	4
(Italy) Formula Racing	Ferrari 296 Challenge	182	(Italy) Michele Rugolo	G	4
(Italy) Formula Racing	Ferrari 296 Challenge	182	(Netherlands) Willem van der Vorm	G	4
(Italy) Formula Racing	Ferrari 296 Challenge	183	(United States) Rey Acosta	G	4
(Italy) Formula Racing	Ferrari 296 Challenge	183	(Italy) Marco Bonanomi	G	4
(Italy) HC Racing Division	Lamborghini Huracán Super Trofeo Evo 2	202	(United Kingdom) Douglas Bolger	Am	All
(Italy) HC Racing Division	Lamborghini Huracán Super Trofeo Evo 2	202	(Italy) Alberto Clementi Pisani	Am	All
(Italy) HC Racing Division	Lamborghini Huracán Super Trofeo Evo 2	202	(Italy) Ferdinando D'Auria	Am	All
(Italy) Invictus Corse	Lamborghini Huracán Super Trofeo Evo 2	207	(Italy) Giovanni Anapoli	Am	All
(Italy) Invictus Corse	Lamborghini Huracán Super Trofeo Evo 2	207	(Italy) Edoardo Barbolini	Am	All
(Italy) Invictus Corse	Lamborghini Huracán Super Trofeo Evo 2	207	(Colombia) Andres Mendez	Am	All
(Italy) EF Racing	Porsche 992 GT3 Cup	217	(Italy) Andrea Buratti	Am	All
(Italy) EF Racing	Porsche 992 GT3 Cup	217	(Netherlands) Sandra van der Sloot	Am	All
(Italy) ZRS Motorsport	Porsche 992 GT3 Cup	224	(Italy) Pierluigi Moscone	Am	4
(Italy) ZRS Motorsport	Porsche 992 GT3 Cup	224	(Italy) Luca Rangoni	Am	4
(Italy) ZRS Motorsport	Porsche 992 GT3 Cup	225	(Italy) Steven Giacon	Am	4
(Italy) ZRS Motorsport	Porsche 992 GT3 Cup	225	(Italy) Luciano Micale	Am	4
(Italy) ZRS Motorsport	Porsche 992 GT3 Cup	225	(Italy) Paolo Prestipino	Am	4
(Slovenia) Lema Racing	Lamborghini Huracán Super Trofeo Evo 2	232	(Italy) Maurizio Fondi	Am	1–3
(Slovenia) Lema Racing	Lamborghini Huracán Super Trofeo Evo 2	232	(Slovenia) Matej Kosic	Am	1–3
(Slovenia) Lema Racing	Lamborghini Huracán Super Trofeo Evo 2	232	(Slovenia) Andrej Lah	Am	1–2
(Italy) Scuderia Ravetto & Ruberti	Ferrari 488 Challenge Evo	251	(Italy) Nicolas Risitano	PA	1–3
(Italy) Scuderia Ravetto & Ruberti	Ferrari 488 Challenge Evo	251	(Republic of Ireland) Lyle Schofield	PA	1–3
(Italy) Scuderia Ravetto & Ruberti	Ferrari 488 Challenge Evo	251	(Italy) Luca Attianese	PA	1–3
(Italy) Scuderia Ravetto & Ruberti	Ferrari 488 Challenge Evo	251	(Italy) Gianmarco Marzialetti	Am	4
(Italy) Scuderia Ravetto & Ruberti	Ferrari 488 Challenge Evo	251	(Italy) Nicolas Risitano	Am	4
(Italy) Scuderia Ravetto & Ruberti	Ferrari 488 Challenge Evo	251	(Republic of Ireland) Lyle Schofield	Am	4
(Italy) Reparto Corse RAM	Ferrari 488 Challenge Evo	255	(Italy) Fabio Daminato	Am	2, 4
(Italy) Reparto Corse RAM	Ferrari 488 Challenge Evo	255	(Italy) Giacomo Parisotto	Am	2, 4
(Italy) Reparto Corse RAM	Ferrari 488 Challenge Evo	255	(Italy) Mattia Simonini	Am	2, 4
(Switzerland) Centri Porsche Ticino	Porsche 992 GT3 Cup	291	(Italy) Max Busnelli	Am	1
(Switzerland) Centri Porsche Ticino	Porsche 992 GT3 Cup	291	(Switzerland) Ivan Martin Jacoma	Am	1
(Switzerland) Centri Porsche Ticino	Porsche 992 GT3 Cup	291	(Italy) Valerio Presezzi	Am	1
(Switzerland) Centri Porsche Ticino	Porsche 992 GT3 Cup	292	(Switzerland) Alex Fontana	Am	All
(Switzerland) Centri Porsche Ticino	Porsche 992 GT3 Cup	292	(Slovenia) Matej Knez	Am	All
(Switzerland) Centri Porsche Ticino	Porsche 992 GT3 Cup	292	(Italy) Patrick Hofmann	Am	3–4
(Switzerland) Centri Porsche Ticino	Porsche 992 GT3 Cup	292	(Italy) Stefano Borghi	Am	1

Icon	Class
P	Pro Cup
PA	Pro-Am Cup
Am	Am Cup
G	Guest

== Race results ==
Bold indicates the overall winners.

=== GT3 ===
Round	Circuit	Date	Pole position	Pro winners	Pro-Am winners	Am winners
1	(Italy) ACI Vallelunga Circuit	16 June	(Italy) No. 27 Scuderia Baldini	**(Italy) No. 27 Scuderia Baldini**	(San Marino) No. 16 AKM Motorsport	(Italy) No. 75 Double TT Racing
1	(Italy) ACI Vallelunga Circuit	16 June	(Italy) Giancarlo Fisichella (Monaco) Arthur Leclerc (Italy) Tommaso Mosca	**(Italy) Giancarlo Fisichella** **(Monaco) Arthur Leclerc** **(Italy) Tommaso Mosca**	(Italy) Filippo Bencivenni (Italy) Lorenzo Ferrari (Italy) Gustavo Sandrucci	(Italy) Leonardo Colavita (Italy) Simone Riccitelli (Switzerland) Christoph Ulrich
2	(Italy) Autodromo Internazionale del Mugello	14 July	(Italy) No. 27 Scuderia Baldini	**(Italy) No. 50 AF Corse**	(Italy) No. 50 AF Corse	(Italy) No. 75 Double TT Racing
2	(Italy) Autodromo Internazionale del Mugello	14 July	(Italy) Giancarlo Fisichella (Monaco) Arthur Leclerc (Italy) Tommaso Mosca	**(Italy) Stefano Gai** **(Italy) Riccardo Ponzio** **(Denmark) Mikkel Mac**	(Italy) Stefano Gai (Italy) Riccardo Ponzio (Denmark) Mikkel Mac	(Italy) Leonardo Colavita (Italy) Simone Riccitelli (Switzerland) Christoph Ulrich
3	(Italy) Autodromo Internazionale Enzo e Dino Ferrari	8 September	(Italy) No. 19 Vincenzo Sospiri Racing	**(Italy) No. 55 Nova Race**	(Italy) No. 8 BMW Italia Ceccato Racing	(Italy) No. 28 Nova Race
3	(Italy) Autodromo Internazionale Enzo e Dino Ferrari	8 September	(Italy) Riccardo Cazzaniga (Italy) Alberto Di Folco (Italy) Edoardo Liberati	**(Italy) Alex Frassineti** **(Italy) Felice Jelmini**	(Italy) Marco Cassarà (Italy) Francesco de Luca (Sweden) Alfred Nilsson	(Italy) Andrea Bodellini (Italy) Fulvio Ferri (Italy) Alessandro Marchetti
4	(Italy) Autodromo Nazionale di Monza	27 October	(Italy) No. 27 Scuderia Baldini	**(Italy) No. 27 Scuderia Baldini**	(Italy) No. 66 Vincenzo Sospiri Racing	(Italy) No. 33 Auto Sport Racing
4	(Italy) Autodromo Nazionale di Monza	27 October	(Italy) Giancarlo Fisichella (Monaco) Arthur Leclerc (Italy) Tommaso Mosca	**(Italy) Giancarlo Fisichella** **(Monaco) Arthur Leclerc** **(Italy) Tommaso Mosca**	(Italy) Mattia Michelotto (Belgium) Gilles Stadsbader (Italy) Ignazio Zanon	(Thailand) Sanporn Jao-Javanil (Serbia) Miloš Pavlović (Germany) Florian Spengler

=== GT Cup ===
Round	Circuit	Date	Pole position	Div. 1 Pro-Am Winners	Div. 1 Am Winners	Div. 2 Pro-Am Winners	Div. 2 Am Winners
1	(Italy) ACI Vallelunga Circuit	16 June	(Italy) No. 172 DL Racing	(Italy) No. 172 DL Racing	(Italy) No. 202 HC Racing Division	(Italy) No. 127 Racevent	(Italy) No. 217 EF Racing
1	(Italy) ACI Vallelunga Circuit	16 June	(Italy) Alessio Caiola (Italy) Luca Segù	(Italy) Alessio Caiola (Italy) Luca Segù	(United Kingdom) Douglas Bolger (Italy) Alberto Clementi Pisani (Italy) Ferdinando D'Auria	(Italy) Giovanni Berton (Italy) Ludovico Laurini (Switzerland) Constantino Peroni	(Italy) Andrea Buratti (Netherlands) Sandra van der Sloot
2	(Italy) Autodromo Internazionale del Mugello	14 July	(Italy) No. 162 DL Racing	(Italy) No. 162 DL Racing	(Italy) No. 202 HC Racing Division	(Italy) No. 127 Racevent	(Italy) No. 217 EF Racing
2	(Italy) Autodromo Internazionale del Mugello	14 July	(Egypt) Ibrahim Badawy (Italy) Diego di Fabio (Portugal) Rodrigo Testa	(Egypt) Ibrahim Badawy (Italy) Diego di Fabio (Portugal) Rodrigo Testa	(United Kingdom) Douglas Bolger (Italy) Alberto Clementi Pisani (Italy) Ferdinando D'Auria	(Italy) Giovanni Berton (Italy) Ludovico Laurini (Switzerland) Constantino Peroni	(Italy) Andrea Buratti (Netherlands) Sandra van der Sloot
3	(Italy) Autodromo Internazionale Enzo e Dino Ferrari	8 September	(Italy) No. 111 Best Lap	(Italy) No. 103 Easy Race	(Italy) No. 272 DL Racing	(Italy) No. 127 Racevent	(Switzerland) No. 292 Centri Porsche Ticino
3	(Italy) Autodromo Internazionale Enzo e Dino Ferrari	8 September	(Italy) Luca Demarchi (Italy) Sabatino Di Mare (Portugal) Simone Patrinicola	(Italy) Francesco La Mazza (Italy) Jody Lambrughi (Italy) Emma Segattini	(Italy) Stefano Gattuso (Italy) Alessandro Mainetti (Italy) Giacomo Riva	(Italy) Giovanni Berton (Italy) Ludovico Laurini (Italy) Constantino Peroni	(Switzerland) Alex Fontana (Slovenia) Matej Knez (Italy) Patrick Hofmann
4	(Italy) Autodromo Nazionale di Monza	27 October	(Italy) No. 182 Formula Racing	(Italy) No. 103 Easy Race	(Italy) No. 202 HC Racing Division	(Italy) No. 117 EF Racing	(Switzerland) No. 292 Centri Porsche Ticino
4	(Italy) Autodromo Nazionale di Monza	27 October	(Italy) Michele Rugolo (Netherlands) Willem van der Vorm	(Italy) Luca Demarchi (Italy) Sabatino Di Mare (Portugal) Simone Patrinicola	(United Kingdom) Douglas Bolger (Italy) Alberto Clementi Pisani (Italy) Ferdinando D'Auria	(Italy) William Mezzetti (Italy) Vittoria Piria	(Switzerland) Alex Fontana (Slovenia) Matej Knez (Italy) Patrick Hofmann

== Drivers' championships ==
=== Scoring system ===
Duration	**1st**	**2nd**	**3rd**	**4th**	**5th**	**6th**	**7th**	**8th**	**9th**	**10th**	**Pole**	**FL**
100 Minutes	12	10	8	7	6	5	4	3	2	1		
3 Hours	20	15	12	10	8	6	4	3	2	1	1	1

=== GT3 ===
==== Endurance Drivers' Championship ====
Pos.	Driver	Team	VAL (Italy)		MUG (Italy)		IMO (Italy)		MNZ (Italy)		Points
Pos.	Driver	Team	100	3H	100	3H	100	3H (Note: The race was planned to run for three hours, but ended at the 104-minute mark due to heavy rain. Hence, half points were given to the teams who finished in the top ten positions.)	100	3H	Points
1	(Italy) Giancarlo Fisichella	(Italy) Scuderia Baldini	1	**1**	11	**7**	4	4	1	**1**	79
1	(Monaco) Arthur Leclerc	(Italy) Scuderia Baldini	1	**1**	11	**7**	4	4	1	**1**	79
1	(Italy) Tommaso Mosca	(Italy) Scuderia Baldini	1	**1**	11	**7**	4	4	1	**1**	79
2	(Italy) Riccardo Cazzaniga	(Italy) Vincenzo Sospiri Racing	4	4	3	2	3	**3**	2	3	62
2	(Italy) Alberto Di Folco	(Italy) Vincenzo Sospiri Racing	4	4	3	2	3	**3**	2	3	62
2	(Italy) Edoardo Liberati	(Italy) Vincenzo Sospiri Racing	4	4	3	2	3	**3**	2	3	62
3	(Italy) Stefano Comandini	(Italy) BMW Italia Ceccato Racing	2	3	22	Ret	2	2	6	4	54.5
3	(United States) Phillippe Denes	(Italy) BMW Italia Ceccato Racing	2	3	22	Ret	2	2	6	4	54.5
3	(Italy) Francesco Guerra	(Italy) BMW Italia Ceccato Racing	2	3	22	Ret	2	2	6	4	54.5
4	(Germany) Alex Aka	(San Marino) Tresor Audi Sport Italia	3	2	6	5	Ret	Ret	4	16	43
4	(Italy) Pietro Delli Guanti	(San Marino) Tresor Audi Sport Italia	3	2	6	5	Ret	Ret	4	16	43
4	(Italy) Rocco Mazzola	(San Marino) Tresor Audi Sport Italia	3	2	6	5	Ret	Ret	4	16	43
5	(Italy) Stefano Gai	(Italy) AF Corse	11	11	1	1	6	6	8	14	42.5
5	(Denmark) Mikkel Mac	(Italy) AF Corse	11	11	1	1	6	6	8	14	42.5
5	(Italy) Riccardo Ponzio	(Italy) AF Corse	11	11	1	1	6	6	8	14	42.5
6	(Belgium) Gilles Stadsbader	(Italy) Vincenzo Sospiri Racing	9	9	9	4	8	8	5	2	40
7	(Italy) Mattia Michelotto	(Italy) Vincenzo Sospiri Racing			9	4	8	8	5	2	38.5
8	(Italy) Andrea Cola	(San Marino) Tresor Audi Sport Italia	8	5	5	3	11	11	16	Ret	31
8	(Italy) Leonardo Moncini	(San Marino) Tresor Audi Sport Italia	8	5	5	3	11	11	16	Ret	31
8	(Netherlands) Glenn van Berlo	(San Marino) Tresor Audi Sport Italia	8	5	5	3	11	11	16	Ret	31
9	(Italy) Felice Jelmini	(Italy) Nova Race	13	13	21	Ret	1	1	10	7	28
10	(Italy) Kikko Galbiati	(Italy) EF Racing (Note: Galbiati competed with Nova Race in Monza.)	7	7	2	20			10	7	23
11	(Italy) Jacopo Guidetti	(Italy) Vincenzo Sospiri Racing	10	10	7	6	Ret	Ret	3	8	22
11	(Belgium) Baptiste Moulin	(Italy) Vincenzo Sospiri Racing	10	10	7	6	Ret	Ret	3	8	22
11	(France) Stephane Tribaudini	(Italy) Vincenzo Sospiri Racing	10	10	7	6	Ret	Ret	3	8	22
12	(Italy) Enrico Fulgenzi	(Italy) EF Racing	7	7	2	20	14	14			18
13	(Italy) Marco Cassarà	(Italy) BMW Italia Ceccato Racing	20	NC	13	10	5	5	9	6	17.5
13	(Italy) Francesco de Luca	(Italy) BMW Italia Ceccato Racing	20	NC	13	10	5	5	9	6	17.5
13	(Sweden) Alfred Nilsson	(Italy) BMW Italia Ceccato Racing	20	NC	13	10	5	5	9	6	17.5
14	(Italy) Alessandro Bracalente	(Italy) AF Corse	6	8	4	8	12	12	15	12	17
14	(Italy) Eliseo Donno	(Italy) AF Corse	6	8	4	8	12	12	15	12	17
15	(Italy) Filippo Bencivenni	(San Marino) AKM Motorsport	5	6	8	19	17	17			14
15	(Italy) Lorenzo Ferrari	(San Marino) AKM Motorsport	5	6	8	19	17	17			14
15	(Italy) Gustavo Sandrucci	(San Marino) AKM Motorsport	5	6	8	19	17	17	Ret	Ret	14
16	(Italy) Alessio Deledda	(Italy) Imperiale Racing	12	12	10	9	13	13	7	5	14
16	(Switzerland) Kevin Gilardoni	(Italy) Imperiale Racing	12	12	10	9	13	13	7	5	14
17	(Italy) Andrea Bodellini	(Italy) Nova Race	16	16	17	15	7	7	11	10	7
17	(Italy) Fulvio Ferri	(Italy) Nova Race	16	16	17	15	7	7	11	10	7
17	(Italy) Alessandro Marchetti	(Italy) Nova Race	16	16	17	15	7	7	11	10	7
18	(Thailand) Sanporn Jao-Javanil	(Italy) Auto Sport Racing	21	Ret	20	17	10	10	13	9	3.5
18	(Serbia) Miloš Pavlović	(Italy) Auto Sport Racing	21	Ret	20	17	10	10	13	9	3.5
18	(Germany) Florian Spengler	(Italy) Auto Sport Racing	21	Ret	20	17	10	10	13	9	3.5
19	(Italy) Massimo Ciglia	(Italy) Nova Race	18	17	16	13	Ret	Ret	12	11	0
19	(Italy) Luca Magnoni	(Italy) Nova Race	18	17	16	13	Ret	Ret	12	11	0
19	(Italy) Rodolfo Massaro	(Italy) Nova Race	18	17	16	13	Ret	Ret	12	11	0
20	(Finland) William Alatalo	(Italy) Lazarus Corse	14	14	12	11	Ret	Ret			0
20	(Spain) Jorge Lorenzo	(Italy) Lazarus Corse	14	14	12	11	Ret	Ret			0
21	(Italy) Leonardo Colavita	(Italy) Double TT Racing	15	15	15	12	16	15	17	15	0
21	(Italy) Simone Riccitelli	(Italy) Double TT Racing	15	15	15	12	16	15	17	15	0
21	(Switzerland) Christoph Ulrich	(Italy) Double TT Racing	15	15	15	12	16	15	17	15	0
22	(Thailand) Nuttapong Lertlamprasertkul	(Italy) Auto Sport Racing	19	19	18	16	15	16	14	13	0
22	(Thailand) Aniwat Lommahadthai	(Italy) Auto Sport Racing	19	19	18	16	15	16	14	13	0
22	(Croatia) Sandro Mur	(Italy) Auto Sport Racing	19	19	18	16	15	16	14	13	0
23	(Kyrgyzstan) Dmitry Gvazava	(Italy) Imperiale Racing			14	14	18	18	Ret	Ret	0
23	(Belize) Alexander Robert Bowen	(Italy) Imperiale Racing	17	18	14	14	18	18	Ret	Ret	0
23	(Italy) Giuseppe Fascicolo	(Italy) Imperiale Racing	17	18	14	14	18	18	Ret	Ret	0
Not classified (Note: Under Article 26 of the Endurance Regulations, in order to participate in the final rankings of the Championship, each driver must have carried out at least three events.)
—N/a	(Italy) Alex Frassineti	(Italy) Nova Race					1	1	10	7	29
—N/a	(Italy) Ignazio Zanon	(Italy) Vincenzo Sospiri Racing					8	8	5	2	25.5
—N/a	(Italy) Stefano Costantini	(Italy) Vincenzo Sospiri Racing			9	4					14
—N/a	(Belgium) Ugo de Wilde	(Italy) Imperiale Racing					13	13	7	5	11
—N/a	(Italy) Alessandro Fabi	(Italy) Vincenzo Sospiri Racing	9	9							5
—N/a	(Poland) Robin Rogalski	(Italy) Imperiale Racing	12	12	10	9					3
—N/a	Andrey Mukovoz	(Italy) Tresor Attempto Racing					9	9			2
—N/a	(Italy) Lorenzo Patrese	(Italy) Tresor Attempto Racing					9	9			2
—N/a	(Germany) Florian Scholze	(Italy) Tresor Attempto Racing					9	9			2
—N/a	(India) Mahaveer Raghunathan	(Italy) Lazarus Corse	14	14	12	11					0
—N/a	(Italy) Marco Butti	(Italy) Nova Race	13	13							0
—N/a	(Italy) Vincenzo Scarpetta	(Italy) Nova Race	13	13	21	Ret					0
—N/a	(Italy) William Mezzetti	(Italy) EF Racing					14	14			0
—N/a	(United States) Aaron Farhadi	(Italy) Imperiale Racing	17	18							0
—N/a	(United States) Thor Haugen	(Italy) Pellin Racing			19	18					0
—N/a	(Italy) Paolo Ruberti	(Italy) Pellin Racing			19	18					0
—N/a	(Italy) Filippo Berto	(Italy) Nova Race			21	Ret					0
—N/a	(Italy) Mattia Di Giusto	(Italy) Lazarus Corse					Ret	Ret			0
—N/a	(United States) Cambiz Aliabadi	(San Marino) AKM Motorsport							Ret	Ret	0
—N/a	(Sweden) Oliver Söderström	(San Marino) AKM Motorsport							Ret	Ret	0
Pos.	Driver	Team	100	3H	100	3H	100	3H	100	3H	Points
Pos.	Driver	Team	VAL (Italy)		MUG (Italy)		IMO (Italy)		MNZ (Italy)		Points

Colour	Result
Gold	Winner
Silver	Second place
Bronze	Third place
Green	Points classification
Blue	Non-points classification
Blue	Non-classified finish (NC)
Purple	Retired, not classified (Ret)
Red	Did not qualify (DNQ)
Red	Did not pre-qualify (DNPQ)
Black	Disqualified (DSQ)
White	Did not start (DNS)
White	Withdrew (WD)
White	Race cancelled (C)
Blank	Did not practice (DNP)
Blank	Did not arrive (DNA)
Blank	Excluded (EX)

**Bold** - Pole position/fastest qualifying time
Italics - Fastest lap

==== Pro-Am Drivers' Championship ====
Pos.	Driver	Team	VAL (Italy)		MUG (Italy)		IMO (Italy)		MNZ (Italy)		Points
Pos.	Driver	Team	100	3H	100	3H	100	3H	100	3H	Points
1	(Belgium) Gilles Stadsbader	(Italy) Vincenzo Sospiri Racing	3	2	5	2	3	3	2	1	79
2	(Italy) Mattia Michelotto	(Italy) Vincenzo Sospiri Racing			5	2	3	3	2	1	68
3	(Italy) Stefano Gai	(Italy) AF Corse	5	5	1	1	2	2	3	5	64.5
3	(Denmark) Mikkel Mac	(Italy) AF Corse	5	5	1	1	2	2	3	5	64.5
3	(Italy) Riccardo Ponzio	(Italy) AF Corse	5	5	1	1	2	2	3	5	64.5
4	(Italy) Jacopo Guidetti	(Italy) Vincenzo Sospiri Racing	4	4	3	3	Ret	Ret	1	**3**	62
4	(Belgium) Baptiste Moulin	(Italy) Vincenzo Sospiri Racing	4	4	3	3	Ret	Ret	1	**3**	62
4	(France) Stephane Tribaudini	(Italy) Vincenzo Sospiri Racing	4	4	3	3	Ret	Ret	1	**3**	62
5	(Italy) Alessandro Bracalente	(Italy) AF Corse	2	**3**	2	**4**	4	4	5	4	61
5	(Italy) Eliseo Donno	(Italy) AF Corse	2	**3**	2	**4**	4	4	5	4	61
6	(Italy) Marco Cassarà	(Italy) BMW Italia Ceccato Racing	9	9	8	6	1	1	4	2	52
6	(Italy) Francesco de Luca	(Italy) BMW Italia Ceccato Racing	9	9	8	6	1	1	4	2	52
6	(Sweden) Alfred Nilsson	(Italy) BMW Italia Ceccato Racing	9	9	8	6	1	1	4	2	52
7	(Italy) Filippo Bencivenni	(San Marino) AKM Motorsport	1	1	4	9	6	**6**			50.5
7	(Italy) Lorenzo Ferrari	(San Marino) AKM Motorsport	1	1	4	9	6	**6**			50.5
7	(Italy) Gustavo Sandrucci	(San Marino) AKM Motorsport	1	1	4	9	6	**6**	Ret	Ret	50.5
8	(Finland) William Alatalo	(Italy) Lazarus Corse	8	8	7	7	Ret	Ret			14
8	(Spain) Jorge Lorenzo	(Italy) Lazarus Corse	8	8	7	7	Ret	Ret			14
Not classified
—N/a	(Belgium) Ignazio Zanon	(Italy) Vincenzo Sospiri Racing					3	3	2	1	25
—N/a	(Italy) Alessandro Fabi	(Italy) Vincenzo Sospiri Racing	3	2							23
—N/a	(Italy) Stefano Costantini	(Italy) Vincenzo Sospiri Racing			5	2					22
—N/a	(Italy) Alessio Deledda	(Italy) Imperiale Racing	6	6	6	5					22
—N/a	(Switzerland) Kevin Gilardoni	(Italy) Imperiale Racing	6	6	6	5					22
—N/a	(Poland) Robin Rogalski	(Italy) Imperiale Racing	6	6	6	5					22
—N/a	(India) Mahaveer Raghunathan	(Italy) Lazarus Corse	8	8	7	7					14
—N/a	(Italy) Enrico Fulgenzi	(Italy) EF Racing					5	5			9.5
—N/a	(Italy) William Mezzetti	(Italy) EF Racing					5	5			9.5
—N/a	(Italy) Felice Jelmini	(Italy) Nova Race	7	7	10	Ret					9
—N/a	(Italy) Vincenzo Scarpetta	(Italy) Nova Race	7	7	10	Ret					9
—N/a	(Italy) Marco Butti	(Italy) Nova Race	7	7							8
—N/a	(United States) Thor Haugen	(Italy) Pellin Racing			9	8					5
—N/a	(Italy) Paolo Ruberti	(Italy) Pellin Racing			9	8					5
—N/a	(Italy) Filippo Berto	(Italy) Nova Race			10	Ret					1
—N/a	(Italy) Mattia Di Giusto	(Italy) Lazarus Corse					Ret	Ret			0
—N/a	(United States) Cambiz Aliabadi	(San Marino) AKM Motorsport							Ret	Ret	0
—N/a	(Sweden) Oliver Söderström	(San Marino) AKM Motorsport							Ret	Ret	0
Pos.	Driver	Team	100	3H	100	3H	100	3H	100	3H	Points
Pos.	Driver	Team	VAL (Italy)		MUG (Italy)		IMO (Italy)		MNZ (Italy)		Points

==== Am Drivers' Championship ====
Pos.	Driver	Team	VAL (Italy)		MUG (Italy)		IMO (Italy)		MNZ (Italy)		Points
Pos.	Driver	Team	100	3H	100	3H	100	3H	100	3H	Points
1	(Italy) Leonardo Colavita	(Italy) Double TT Racing	1	**1**	2	**1**	5	4	5	5	78
1	(Italy) Simone Riccitelli	(Italy) Double TT Racing	1	**1**	2	**1**	5	4	5	5	78
1	(Switzerland) Christoph Ulrich	(Italy) Double TT Racing	1	**1**	2	**1**	5	4	5	5	78
2	(Italy) Andrea Bodellini	(Italy) Nova Race	2	2	4	4	1	1	1	2	74
2	(Italy) Fulvio Ferri	(Italy) Nova Race	2	2	4	4	1	1	1	2	74
2	(Italy) Alessandro Marchetti	(Italy) Nova Race	2	2	4	4	1	1	1	2	74
3	(Italy) Massimo Ciglia	(Italy) Nova Race	4	3	3	2	Ret	**Ret**	2	3	65
3	(Italy) Luca Magnoni	(Italy) Nova Race	4	3	3	2	Ret	**Ret**	2	3	65
3	(Italy) Rodolfo Massaro	(Italy) Nova Race	4	3	3	2	Ret	**Ret**	2	3	65
4	(Thailand) Sanporn Jao-Javanil	(Italy) Auto Sport Racing	6	6	6	6	3	3	3	1	55
4	(Serbia) Miloš Pavlović	(Italy) Auto Sport Racing	6	6	6	6	3	3	3	1	55
4	(Germany) Florian Spengler	(Italy) Auto Sport Racing	6	6	6	6	3	3	3	1	55
5	(Belize) Alexander Robert Bowen	(Italy) Imperiale Racing	3	4	1	3	6	6	Ret	**Ret**	49.5
5	(Italy) Giuseppe Fascicolo	(Italy) Imperiale Racing	3	4	1	3	6	6	Ret	**Ret**	49.5
6	(Thailand) Nuttapong Lertlamprasertkul	(Italy) Auto Sport Racing	5	5	5	5	4	5	4	4	44
6	(Thailand) Aniwat Lommahadthai	(Italy) Auto Sport Racing	5	5	5	5	4	5	4	4	44
6	(Croatia) Sandro Mur	(Italy) Auto Sport Racing	5	5	5	5	4	5	4	4	44
7	(Kyrgyzstan) Dmitry Gvazava	(Italy) Imperiale Racing			1	3	6	6	Ret	**Ret**	31.5
Not classified
—N/a	(United States) Aaron Farhadi	(Italy) Imperiale Racing	3	4							18
—N/a	Andrey Mukovoz	(Italy) Tresor Attempto Racing					2	2			17.5
—N/a	(Italy) Lorenzo Patrese	(Italy) Tresor Attempto Racing					2	2			17.5
—N/a	(Germany) Florian Scholze	(Italy) Tresor Attempto Racing					2	2			17.5
Pos.	Driver	Team	100	3H	100	3H	100	3H	100	3H	Points
Pos.	Driver	Team	VAL (Italy)		MUG (Italy)		IMO (Italy)		MNZ (Italy)		Points

=== GT Cup ===
==== Pro-Am Drivers' Championship (Division 1) ====
Pos.	Driver	Team	VAL (Italy)		MUG (Italy)		IMO (Italy)		MNZ (Italy)		Points
Pos.	Driver	Team	100	3H	100	3H	100	3H	100	3H	Points
1	(Italy) Luca Demarchi	(Italy) Best Lap	2	2	2	3	2	**2**	1	1	81
1	(Italy) Sabatino Di Mare	(Italy) Best Lap	2	2	2	3	2	**2**	1	1	81
1	(Italy) Simone Patrinicola	(Italy) Best Lap	2	2	2	3	2	**2**	1	1	81
2	(Italy) Alessio Caiola	(Italy) DL Racing	1	**1**	3	2	4	4	3	Ret	73
2	(Italy) Luca Segù	(Italy) DL Racing	1	**1**	3	2	4	4	3	Ret	73
3	(Italy) Francesco La Mazza	(Italy) Easy Race	4	4	4	4	1	1	4	Ret	58
4	(Italy) Luca Attianese	(Italy) Scuderia Ravetto & Ruberti	3	3	4	5	3	3			48
4	(Italy) Nicolas Risitano	(Italy) Scuderia Ravetto & Ruberti	3	3	4	5	3	3			48
4	(Republic of Ireland) Lyle Schofield	(Italy) Scuderia Ravetto & Ruberti	3	3	4	5	3	3			48
5	(Italy) Andrea Fontana	(Italy) DL Racing			3	2	4	4	3	Ret	36
Not classified
—N/a	(Egypt) Ibrahim Badawy	(Italy) DL Racing			1	**1**					34
—N/a	(Italy) Diego di Fabio	(Italy) DL Racing			1	**1**					34
—N/a	(Portugal) Rodrigo Testa	(Italy) DL Racing			1	**1**					34
—N/a	(Italy) Alex Bacci	(Italy) Easy Race	4	4	4	4					33
—N/a	(Italy) Emma Segattini	(Italy) Easy Race					1	1	4	Ret	29
—N/a	(Belgium) Gilles Renmans	(Italy) Double TT Racing							2	**2**	26
—N/a	(Belgium) Vincenzo Scarpetta	(Italy) Double TT Racing							2	**2**	26
—N/a	(Italy) Jody Lambrughi	(Italy) Easy Race					1	1			22
—N/a	(Italy) Emiliano Pierantoni	(Italy) Easy Race	4	4							17
—N/a	(Italy) Lorenzo Bontempelli	(Italy) Easy Race			4	4					16
—N/a	(Italy) Vito Postiglione	(Italy) Easy Race							4	Ret	7
Guest drivers
—N/a	(United States) Rey Acosta	(Italy) Formula Racing							1	1	0
—N/a	(Italy) Marco Bonanomi	(Italy) Formula Racing							1	1	0
—N/a	(Italy) Michele Rugolo	(Italy) Formula Racing							2	Ret	0
—N/a	(Netherlands) Willem van der Vorm	(Italy) Formula Racing							2	Ret	0
Pos.	Driver	Team	100	3H	100	3H	100	3H	100	3H	Points
Pos.	Driver	Team	VAL (Italy)		MUG (Italy)		IMO (Italy)		MNZ (Italy)		Points

==== Pro-Am Drivers' Championship (Division 2) ====
Pos.	Driver	Team	VAL (Italy)		MUG (Italy)		IMO (Italy)		MNZ (Italy)		Points
Pos.	Driver	Team	100	3H	100	3H	100	3H	100	3H	Points
1	(Italy) Giovanni Berton	(Italy) Racevent	1	**1**	1	**1**	1	**1**			91
1	(Italy) Ludovico Laurini	(Italy) Racevent	1	**1**	1	**1**	1	**1**			91
1	(Italy) Constantino Peroni	(Italy) Racevent	1	**1**	1	**1**	1	**1**			91
2	(Italy) Daniele Cazzaniga	(Italy) Ebimotors	2	2	2	2	2	2	2	2	77
2	(Italy) Davide di Benedetto	(Italy) Ebimotors	2	2	2	2	2	2	2	2	77
2	(Italy) Giuseppe Nicolosi	(Italy) Ebimotors	2	2	2	2	2	2	2	2	77
Not classified
—N/a	(Italy) William Mezzetti	(Italy) EF Racing							1	**1**	33
—N/a	(Italy) Vittoria Piria	(Italy) EF Racing							1	**1**	33
—N/a	(Italy) Paolo Calcagno	(Italy) Racevent							3	3	20
—N/a	(Italy) Jenny Sonzogni	(Italy) Racevent							3	3	20
—N/a	(Italy) Ronnie Valori	(Italy) Racevent							3	3	20

==== Am Drivers' Championship (Division 1) ====
Pos.	Driver	Team	VAL (Italy)		MUG (Italy)		IMO (Italy)		MNZ (Italy)		Points
Pos.	Driver	Team	100	3H	100	3H	100	3H	100	3H	Points
1	(United Kingdom) Douglas Bolger	(Italy) HC Racing Division	1	**3**	1	**2**	2	**2**	4	1	87
1	(Italy) Alberto Clementi Pisani	(Italy) HC Racing Division	1	**3**	1	**2**	2	**2**	4	1	87
1	(Italy) Ferdinando D'Auria	(Italy) HC Racing Division	1	**3**	1	**2**	2	**2**	4	1	87
2	(Italy) Pietro Agoglia	(Italy) Best Lap	3	2	2	1	4	4	1	4	76
3	(Italy) Giammarco Marzialetti	(Italy) Best Lap (Note: Marzialetti competed with Scuderia Ravetto & Ruberti in Monza.)	3	2	2	1	4	4	3	3	74
4	(Italy) Stefano Gattuso	(Italy) DL Racing	2	1	4	3	1	1			71
4	(Italy) Alessandro Mainetti	(Italy) DL Racing	2	1	4	3	1	1	Ret	Ret	71
4	(Italy) Giacomo Riva	(Italy) DL Racing	2	1	4	3	1	1	Ret	Ret	71
5	(Italy) Filippo Croccolino	(Italy) Best Lap			2	1	4	4	1	4	64
6	(Italy) Giovanni Anapoli	(Italy) Invictus Corse	5	5	5	5	3	3	2	2	52
6	(Italy) Edoardo Barbolini	(Italy) Invictus Corse	5	5	5	5	3	3	2	2	52
6	(Colombia) Andres Mendez	(Italy) Invictus Corse	5	5	5	5	3	3	2	2	52
7	(Italy) Maurizio Fondi	(Slovenia) Lema Racing	4	4	6	6	5	5			26.5
7	(Slovenia) Matej Kosic	(Slovenia) Lema Racing	4	4	6	6	5	5			26.5
Not classified
—N/a	(Italy) Fabio Daminato	(Italy) Reparto Corse RAM			3	4			5	Ret	25
—N/a	(Italy) Giacomo Parisotto	(Italy) Reparto Corse RAM			3	4			5	Ret	25
—N/a	(Italy) Mattia Simonini	(Italy) Reparto Corse RAM			3	4			5	Ret	25
—N/a	(Italy) Vito Postiglione	(Italy) Best Lap	3	2							24
—N/a	(Italy) Gianluca Carboni	(Italy) Best Lap							1	4	22
—N/a	(Italy) Nicolas Risitano	(Italy) Scuderia Ravetto & Ruberti							3	3	20
—N/a	(Republic of Ireland) Lyle Schofield	(Italy) Scuderia Ravetto & Ruberti							3	3	20
—N/a	(Slovenia) Andrej Lah	(Slovenia) Lema Racing	4	4							7
—N/a	(Portugal) Rodrigo Testa	(Italy) DL Racing							Ret	Ret	0

==== Am Drivers' Championship (Division 2) ====
Pos.	Driver	Team	VAL (Italy)		MUG (Italy)		IMO (Italy)		MNZ (Italy)		Points
Pos.	Driver	Team	100	3H	100	3H	100	3H	100	3H	Points
1	(Italy) Andrea Buratti	(Italy) EF Racing	1	1	1	**1**	2	2	2	3	88
1	(Netherlands) Sandra van der Sloot	(Italy) EF Racing	1	1	1	**1**	2	2	2	3	88
2	(Switzerland) Alex Fontana	(Switzerland) Centri Porsche Ticino	3	3	2	2	1	**1**	1	1	84
2	(Slovenia) Matej Knez	(Switzerland) Centri Porsche Ticino	3	3	2	2	1	**1**	1	1	84
Not classified
—N/a	(Germany) Patrick Hofmann	(Switzerland) Centri Porsche Ticino					1	**1**	1	1	56
—N/a	(Italy) Max Busnelli	(Switzerland) Centri Porsche Ticino	2	**2**							27
—N/a	(Switzerland) Ivan Martin Jacoma	(Switzerland) Centri Porsche Ticino	2	**2**							27
—N/a	(Italy) Valerio Presezzi	(Switzerland) Centri Porsche Ticino	2	**2**							27
—N/a	(Italy) Steven Giacon	(Italy) ZRS Motorsport							3	2	23
—N/a	(Italy) Luciano Micale	(Italy) ZRS Motorsport							3	2	23
—N/a	(Italy) Paolo Prestipino	(Italy) ZRS Motorsport							3	2	23
—N/a	(Italy) Stefano Borghi	(Switzerland) Centri Porsche Ticino	3	3							20
—N/a	(Italy) Pierluigi Moscone	(Italy) ZRS Motorsport							4	**Ret**	8
—N/a	(Italy) Luca Rangoni	(Italy) ZRS Motorsport							4	**Ret**	8

== Constructors' championships ==
Points are awarded only to the highest finishing competitor from each constructor.

=== Scoring system ===
Position	1st	2nd	3rd	4th	5th	6th	7th	8th	9th	10th
Points	20	15	12	10	8	6	4	3	2	1

=== GT3 Endurance Constructors' Championship ===
Pos.	Constructor	Car	VAL (Italy)		MUG (Italy)		IMO (Italy)		MNZ (Italy)		Points
Pos.	Constructor	Car	100	3H	100	3H	100	3H	100	3H	Points
1	(Italy) Scuderia Baldini	Ferrari 296 GT3	1	1	11	7	4	4	1	1	80
2	(Italy) Vincenzo Sospiri Racing	Lamborghini Huracán GT3 Evo 2	4	4	3	2	3	3	2	2	76
3	(Italy) BMW Italia Ceccato Racing	BMW M4 GT3	2	3	13	10	2	2	6	4	55.5
4	(Italy) AF Corse	Ferrari 488 GT3 Evo 2020	6	8	1	1	6	6	8	12	49.5
5	(San Marino) Tresor Audi Sport Italia	Audi R8 LMS Evo II	3	2	5	3	11	11	4	16	48
6	(Italy) Nova Race	Honda NSX GT3 Evo22	13	13	16	13	1	1	10	7	27
7	(Italy) EF Racing	Porsche 911 GT3 R (992)	7	7	2	20	14	14			18
8	(Italy) Imperiale Racing	Lamborghini Huracán GT3 Evo 2	12	12	10	9	13	13	7	5	14
9	(San Marino) AKM Motorsport	Mercedes-AMG GT3 Evo	5	6	8	19	17	17	Ret	Ret	14
10	(Italy) Auto Sport Racing	Lamborghini Huracán GT3 Evo 2	19	19	18	16	10	10	13	19	3.5
11	(Germany) Tresor Attempto Racing	Audi R8 LMS Evo II					9	9			3
12	(Italy) Lazarus Corse	Aston Martin Vantage AMR GT3	14	14	12	11	Ret	Ret			0
13	(Italy) Double TT Racing	Ferrari 488 GT3 Evo 2020	15	15	15	12	16	15	17	15	0
14	(Italy) Pellin Racing	Ferrari 488 GT3 Evo 2020			19	18					0

=== GT Cup Endurance Constructors' Championships ===
==== Pro-Am (Division 1) ====
Pos.	Constructor	Car	VAL (Italy)		MUG (Italy)		IMO (Italy)		MNZ (Italy)		Points
Pos.	Constructor	Car	100	3H	100	3H	100	3H	100	3H	Points
1	(Italy) Best Lap	Ferrari 488 Challenge Evo	2	2	2	3	2	2	1	1	96.5
2	(Italy) DL Racing	Lamborghini Huracán Super Trofeo Evo 2	1	1	1	1	4	4	3	Ret	84
3	(Italy) Easy Race	Ferrari 488 Challenge Evo	4	4	4	4	1	1	4	Ret	62
4	(Italy) Scuderia Ravetto & Ruberti	Ferrari 488 Challenge Evo	3	3	4	5	3	3			48
5	(Italy) Double TT Racing	Ferrari 488 Challenge Evo							2	2	25

==== Pro-Am (Division 2) ====
Pos.	Constructor	Car	VAL (Italy)		MUG (Italy)		IMO (Italy)		MNZ (Italy)		Points
Pos.	Constructor	Car	100	3H	100	3H	100	3H	100	3H	Points
1	(Italy) Racevent	Porsche 992 GT3 Cup	1	1	1	1	1	1	3	3	106
2	(Italy) Ebimotors	Porsche 992 GT3 Cup	2	2	2	2	2	2	2	2	92.5
3	(Italy) EF Racing	Porsche 992 GT3 Cup							1	1	32

==== Am (Division 1) ====
Pos.	Constructor	Car	VAL (Italy)		MUG (Italy)		IMO (Italy)		MNZ (Italy)		Points
Pos.	Constructor	Car	100	3H	100	3H	100	3H	100	3H	Points
1	(Italy) HC Racing Division	Lamborghini Huracán Super Trofeo Evo 2	1	3	1	2	2	2	4	1	95.5
2	(Italy) Best Lap	Ferrari 488 Challenge Evo	3	2	2	1	4	4	1	4	87
3	(Italy) DL Racing	Lamborghini Huracán Super Trofeo Evo 2	2	1	4	3	1	1	Ret	Ret	71
4	(Italy) Invictus Corse	Lamborghini Huracán Super Trofeo Evo 2	5	5	5	5	3	3	2	2	58
5	(Slovenia) Lema Racing	Lamborghini Huracán Super Trofeo Evo 2	4	4	6	6	5	5			26.5
6	(Italy) Reparto Corse RAM	Ferrari 488 Challenge Evo			3	4			5	Ret	24
7	(Italy) Scuderia Ravetto & Ruberti	Ferrari 488 Challenge Evo							3	3	20

==== Am (Division 2) ====
Pos.	Constructor	Car	VAL (Italy)		MUG (Italy)		IMO (Italy)		MNZ (Italy)		Points
Pos.	Constructor	Car	100	3H	100	3H	100	3H	100	3H	Points
1	(Switzerland) Centri Porsche Ticino	Porsche 992 GT3 Cup	2	2	2	2	1	1	1	1	104
2	(Italy) EF Racing	Porsche 992 GT3 Cup	1	1	1	1	2	2	2	3	103.5
3	(Italy) ZRS Motorsport	Porsche 992 GT3 Cup							3	2	23
