= 2022 ADAC TCR Germany Touring Car Championship =

Touring Car Championship

The 2022 ADAC TCR Germany Touring Car Championship was be the seventh season of touring car racing ran by the German-based sanctioning body ADAC to the TCR regulations.

Luca Engstler was the defending Drivers' champion and Hyundai Team Engstler was the defending Teams' champion. This year Martin Andersen and Liqui Moly Team Engstler won.

== Teams and drivers ==
Hankook is the official tire supplier.

Team	Car	No.	Drivers	Class	Rounds	Ref.
(Germany) ROJA Motorsport by ASL Lichtblau	Hyundai i30 N TCR	8	(Germany) René Kircher	J	All	
(Germany) ROJA Motorsport by ASL Lichtblau	Hyundai i30 N TCR	44	(Germany) Tim Rölleke	G	6	
(Germany) ROJA Motorsport by ASL Lichtblau	Hyundai Veloster N TCR	44	(Germany) Tim Rölleke	G	7	
(Germany) ROJA Motorsport by ASL Lichtblau	Hyundai Veloster N TCR	18	(Germany) Kai Jordan	G	6	
(Germany) ROJA Motorsport by ASL Lichtblau	Hyundai Veloster N TCR	22	(Germany) Robin Jahr		All	
(Germany) ROJA Motorsport by ASL Lichtblau	Hyundai Veloster N TCR	26	(Sweden) Jessica Bäckman		1–5	
(Belgium) Comtoyou Racing	Audi RS 3 LMS TCR (2021)	26	(Sweden) Jessica Bäckman		6–7	
(Germany) Engstler Honda Type R Liqui Moly Racing Team	Honda Civic Type R TCR (FK8)	9	(Germany) Roland Hertner	T	All	
(Germany) Engstler Honda Type R Liqui Moly Racing Team	Honda Civic Type R TCR (FK8)	19	(Denmark) Martin Andersen		All	
(Germany) Engstler Honda Type R Liqui Moly Racing Team	Honda Civic Type R TCR (FK8)	21	(Poland) Szymon Ładniak	J	All	
(Switzerland) Maurer Motorsport	Holden Astra TCR	11	(Belgium) Vincent Radermecker	T	1–5, 7	
(Switzerland) Maurer Motorsport	Holden Astra TCR	14	(Netherlands) Niels Langeveld		6	
(Switzerland) Maurer Motorsport	Holden Astra TCR	17	(Switzerland) Michael Maurer		All	
(Germany) Gruhn Stahlbau Racing	Audi RS 3 LMS TCR (2021)	13	(Germany) Max Frederik Gruhn	J	All	
(Lithuania) Nordpass	Hyundai i30 N TCR	27	(Lithuania) Jonas Karklys		All	
(Germany) RaceSing	Hyundai i30 N TCR	34	(Germany) Patrick Sing		All	
(Germany) K-Ro Racing	Audi RS 3 LMS TCR (2017)	38	(Germany) Kai Rosowski		1–4, 6	
(Italy) Élite Motorsport	Audi RS 3 LMS TCR (2021)	46	(Italy) Marco Butti	G	4	
(France) NS Competition	Cupra León Competición TCR	47	(France) Dorian Guldenfels		4	
(Poland) Albert Legutko Racing	Honda Civic Type R TCR (FK2)	77	(Poland) Albert Legutko	J	1, 7	

Icon	Class
J	Eligible for the Honda Junior Challenge
T	Eligible for ADAC TCR Germany Trophy

== Calendar and results ==
Rnd.		Circuit	Date	Pole position	Fastest lap	Winning driver	Winning team	Junior winner	Trophy winner
1	1	(Germany) Motorsport Arena Oschersleben, Oschersleben	23 April	(Denmark) Martin Andersen	(Denmark) Martin Andersen	(Sweden) Jessica Bäckman	(Germany) ROJA Motorsport by ASL Lichtblau	(Germany) René Kircher	(Germany) Roland Hertner
1	2	(Germany) Motorsport Arena Oschersleben, Oschersleben	24 April	(Denmark) Martin Andersen	(Germany) René Kircher	(Denmark) Martin Andersen	(Germany) Liqui Moly Team Engstler	(Germany) René Kircher	(Germany) Roland Hertner
2	3	(Austria) Red Bull Ring, Spielberg	21 May	(Lithuania) Jonas Karklys	(Sweden) Jessica Bäckman	(Sweden) Jessica Bäckman	(Germany) ROJA Motorsport by ASL Lichtblau	(Poland) Szymon Ładniak	(Germany) Roland Hertner
2	4	(Austria) Red Bull Ring, Spielberg	22 May	(Lithuania) Jonas Karklys	(Lithuania) Jonas Karklys	(Sweden) Jessica Bäckman	(Germany) ROJA Motorsport by ASL Lichtblau	(Poland) Szymon Ładniak	(Belgium) Vincent Radermecker
3	5	(Austria) Salzburgring, Salzburg	18 June	(Poland) Szymon Ładniak	(Poland) Szymon Ładniak	(Poland) Szymon Ładniak	(Germany) Liqui Moly Team Engstler	(Poland) Szymon Ładniak	(Germany) Roland Hertner
3	6	(Austria) Salzburgring, Salzburg	19 June	(Sweden) Jessica Bäckman	(Sweden) Jessica Bäckman	(Sweden) Jessica Bäckman	(Germany) ROJA Motorsport by ASL Lichtblau	(Poland) Szymon Ładniak	(Germany) Roland Hertner
4	7	(Germany) Nürburgring, Nürburg	6–7 August	(Denmark) Martin Andersen	(Sweden) Jessica Bäckman	(Denmark) Martin Andersen	(Germany) Liqui Moly Team Engstler	(Poland) Szymon Ładniak	(Belgium) Vincent Radermecker
4	8	(Germany) Nürburgring, Nürburg	6–7 August	(Denmark) Martin Andersen	(Germany) René Kircher	(Denmark) Martin Andersen	(Germany) Liqui Moly Team Engstler	(Germany) René Kircher	(Belgium) Vincent Radermecker
5	9	(Germany) Lausitzring, Klettwitz	20–21 August	(Denmark) Martin Andersen	(Denmark) Martin Andersen	(Denmark) Martin Andersen	(Germany) Liqui Moly Team Engstler	(Poland) Szymon Ładniak	(Belgium) Vincent Radermecker
5	10	(Germany) Lausitzring, Klettwitz	20–21 August	(Sweden) Jessica Bäckman	(Lithuania) Jonas Karklys	(Denmark) Martin Andersen	(Germany) Liqui Moly Team Engstler	(Poland) Szymon Ładniak	(Belgium) Vincent Radermecker
6	11	(Germany) Sachsenring, Hohenstein-Ernstthal	24–25 September	(Denmark) Martin Andersen	(Poland) Szymon Ładniak	(Denmark) Martin Andersen	(Germany) Liqui Moly Team Engstler	(Germany) René Kircher	(Germany) Roland Hertner
6	12	(Germany) Sachsenring, Hohenstein-Ernstthal	24–25 September	(Denmark) Martin Andersen	(Denmark) Martin Andersen	(Denmark) Martin Andersen	(Germany) Liqui Moly Team Engstler	(Germany) René Kircher	(Germany) Kai Jordan
7	13	(Germany) Hockenheimring, Hockenheim	22–23 October	(Lithuania) Jonas Karklys	(Denmark) Martin Andersen	(Poland) Szymon Ładniak	(Germany) Liqui Moly Team Engstler	(Poland) Szymon Ładniak	(Germany) Roland Hertner
7	14	(Germany) Hockenheimring, Hockenheim	22–23 October	(Poland) Szymon Ładniak	(Poland) Szymon Ładniak	(Poland) Szymon Ładniak	(Germany) Liqui Moly Team Engstler	(Poland) Szymon Ładniak	(Belgium) Vincent Radermecker
