= Bence Válint =

Hungarian racing driver (born 2004)

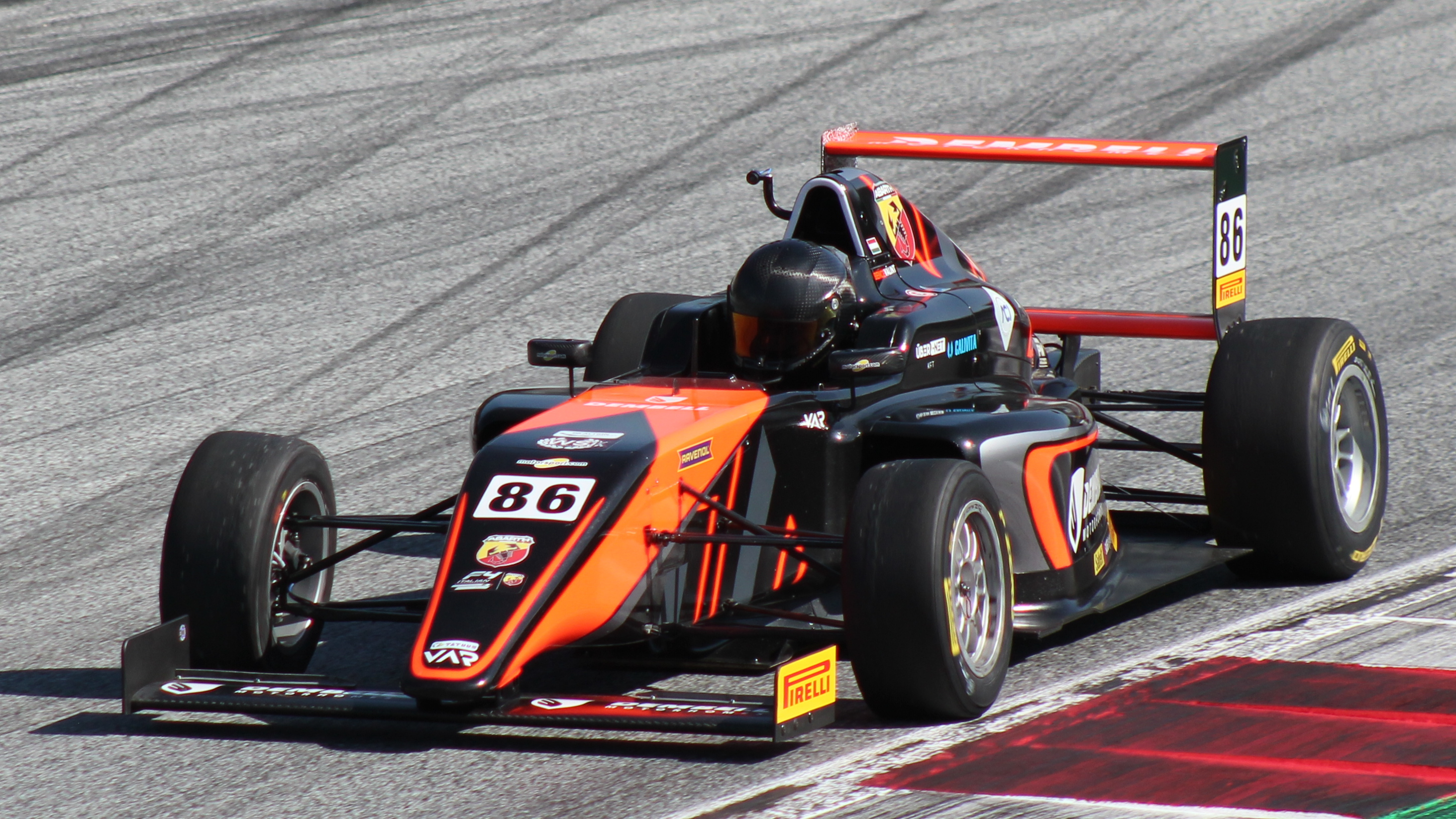
- Válint at the Red Bull Ring in 2021
- Born: 27 November 2004 (age 21); Hungary
- Nationality: (Hungary) Hungarian
- Categorisation: FIA Silver

Championship titles
- 2024: Ferrari Challenge World Final – Trofeo Pirelli

Bence Válint (born 27 November 2004) is a Hungarian racing driver who last competed for Reiter Engineering in the LMP3 class of the Le Mans Cup.

== Personal life ==
Válint is the son of Tibor Válint, an amateur racing driver who sporadically raced in Ferrari Challenge Europe. Válint is also the older brother of Balázs Válint, who raced against Bence in karts.

== Career ==
Válint began karting at an early age at the Hargitai Racing Club after being encouraged to do so by his father. During his karting career, he won the Hungarian International Open Championship twice, in Micro Max in 2014 and in Mini Max in 2017.

Following his final year of karting in 2019, Válint made his single-seater debut the following year, joining BWT Mücke Motorsport to race in the Italian F4 Championship. After finishing no higher than 17th in the three races in the season-opening round at Misano, Válint switched to Van Amersfoort Racing for the rest of the season. In the following six rounds, Válint scored his maiden series points at Monza by finishing sixth in race one, which helped him end the year 21st in points.

The following year, Válint remained with Van Amersfoort Racing to race full-time in Italian F4 and part-time in ADAC Formula 4. In his second season of Italian F4, Válint scored points four times, which included a best result of fifth at Imola, as he ended the year 21st in points for the second year in a row. Whereas in the ADAC F4 Championship, Válint raced in the first three rounds, taking a best result of seventh at Hockenheim in his last appearance.

Válint then spent a year in Lotus Cup Europe, before joining Rossocorsa to race in the 2023 Ferrari Challenge Europe season in the Trofeo Pirelli class from Misano onwards. In his first season in the series, he won second time out at Misano, and took five more podiums to end the year third in the standings despite missing the round at Estoril.

Remaining in Ferrari Challenge Europe for 2024, Válint opened up the season by winning race two at Mugello and finishing second in race one to take an early points lead. Válint then took six podiums in the following five rounds before taking his second and final win of the season in race one of the season-ending round at Imola before finishing third in race two to secure runner-up honours. After that, Válint beat Giacomo Altoè and Luca Ludwig to win the Ferrari Challenge World Finals Trofeo Pirelli title at the same venue. At the end of 2024, Válint joined Ultimate for the Sepang round of the 2024–25 Asian Le Mans Series in the LMP3 class. On his LMP3 debut, Válint won both races from pole.

After winning the 6 Hours of Barcelona in the Cup 1 class in early 2025, Válint joined Reiter Engineering to make his full-time debut in the LMP3 class of the Le Mans Cup. On his series debut at Barcelona, Válint finished tenth overall and ninth in the LMP3 class, before taking his maiden series podium at Le Castellet by finishing third. Válint then finished eighth and fifth in the two races at Le Mans, and followed that up with a sixth-place finish at Spa and a retirement at Algarve to end the year eighth in points.

== Karting record ==
=== Karting career summary ===
Season	Series	Team	Position
2014	Rotax Max Challenge Central-Eastern Europe – Micro Max		3rd
2015	Rotax Max Challenge Central-Eastern Europe – Mini Max		7th
2015	Euro Finale – Mini Max		9th
2016	Rotax Max Challenge Central-Eastern Europe – Mini Max		4th
2016	Euro Finale – Mini Max		3rd
2016	Hungarian International Open Championship – Mini Max	Hargitai Racing	4th
2017	Rotax Max Wintercup – Junior Max	Hargitai Racing	15th
2017	Hungarian International Open Championship – Mini Max	Hargitai Racing	1st
2017	Hungarian International Open Championship – Junior	Hargitai Racing	26th
2017	Rotax Max Challenge Grand Finals – Mini Max	Hargitai Racing	8th
2018	Hungarian International Open Championship – Junior	Hargitai Racing	5th
2018	Rotax Max Challenge Grand Finals – Junior Max	Hargitai Racing	43rd
2019	Austrian Kart Championship – Rotax Senior	KMS Europe	12th
2019	FIA Central European Zone – Rotax Senior	KMS Europe	
2019	Rotax Max Challenge International Trophy – Senior Max	KMS Europe	28th
2019	Rotax Max Challenge Grand Finals – Senior Max	KMS Europe	21st

== Racing record ==
=== Racing career summary ===
Season	Series	Team	Races	Wins	Poles	F/Laps	Podiums	Points	Position
2020	Italian F4 Championship	BWT Mücke Motorsport	3	0	0	0	0	8	21st
2020	Italian F4 Championship	Van Amersfoort Racing	17	0	0	0	0	8	21st
2021	Italian F4 Championship	Van Amersfoort Racing	21	0	0	0	0	20	21st
2021	ADAC Formula 4 Championship	Van Amersfoort Racing	9	0	0	1	0	18	16th
2022	Lotus Cup Europe – Exige Cup	Hargital Racing KFT	11	1	3	1	10	249	3rd
2023	Ferrari Challenge Europe – Trofeo Pirelli (Pro)	Rossocorsa – Ferrari Budapest	9	1	1	1	6	103	3rd
2023	Ferrari Challenge World Final – Trofeo Pirelli	Rossocorsa – Ferrari Budapest	1	0	0	0	0	N/A	NC
2024	Ferrari Challenge Europe – Trofeo Pirelli (Pro)	Ferrari Budapest – Rossocorsa	14	2	0	1	10	140	2nd
2024	Ferrari Challenge World Final – Trofeo Pirelli	Ferrari Budapest – Rossocorsa	1	1	0	0	1	N/A	1st
2024-25	Asian Le Mans Series – LMP3	Ultimate	2	2	2	1	2	52	9th
2025	6h de Barcelona – CUP 1	Rossocorsa Racing	1	1	1	1	1	—N/a	**1st**
2025	Le Mans Cup – LMP3	Reiter Engineering	7	0	0	0	1	36	8th

=== Complete Italian F4 Championship results ===
(key) (Races in bold indicate pole position) (Races in italics indicate fastest lap)

Year	Team	1	2	3	4	5	6	7	8	9	10	11	12	13	14	15	16	17	18	19	20	21	Pos.	Points
2020	BWT Mücke Motorsport	MIS; 1; 17	MIS; 2; 20	MIS; 3; 18																			21st	8
2020	Van Amersfoort Racing				IMO1; 1; 18	IMO1; 2; 23	IMO1; 3 Ret	RBR; 1; 20	RBR; 2; 24	RBR; 3; 22	MUG; 1; 22	MUG; 2; 26	MUG; 3; 25	MNZ; 1; 6	MNZ; 2; 12	MNZ; 3; 18	IMO2; 1; 21	IMO2; 2 Ret	IMO2; 3; 20	VLL; 1; 29	VLL; 2 C	VLL; 3; 18	21st	8
2021	Van Amersfoort Racing	LEC; 1; 21	LEC; 2 Ret	LEC; 3; 11	MIS; 1; 29†	MIS; 2; 11	MIS; 3 Ret	VLL; 1; 13	VLL; 2; 7	VLL; 3; 9	IMO; 1 Ret	IMO; 2; 5	IMO; 3; 26	RBR; 1; 15	RBR; 2; 9	RBR; 3; 27	MUG; 1; 15	MUG; 2; 26†	MUG; 3; 12	MNZ; 1 Ret	MNZ; 2; 17	MNZ; 3; 26	21st	20

=== Complete ADAC Formula 4 Championship results ===
(key) (Races in bold indicate pole position) (Races in italics indicate fastest lap)

Year	Team	1	2	3	4	5	6	7	8	9	10	11	12	13	14	15	16	17	18	Pos	Points
2021	Van Amersfoort Racing	RBR; 1; 21	RBR; 2 Ret	RBR; 3; 8	ZAN; 1; 9	ZAN; 2; 11	ZAN; 3; 17	HOC1; 1; 9	HOC1; 2; 8	HOC1; 3; 7	SAC; 1	SAC; 2	SAC; 3	HOC2; 1	HOC2; 2	HOC2; 3	NÜR; 1	NÜR; 2	NÜR; 3	16th	18

=== Complete Asian Le Mans Series results ===
(key) (Races in bold indicate pole position) (Races in italics indicate fastest lap)

Year	Team	Class	Car	Engine	1	2	3	4	5	6	Pos.	Points
2024–25	Ultimate	LMP3	Ligier JS P320	Nissan VK56DE 5.6L V8	**SEP**; **1**; 1	**SEP**; **2**; 1	DUB; 1	DUB; 2	ABU; 1	ABU; 2	9th	52

=== Complete Le Mans Cup results ===
(key) (Races in bold indicate pole position; results in italics indicate fastest lap)

Year	Entrant	Class	Chassis	1	2	3	4	5	6	7	Rank	Points
2025	Reiter Engineering	LMP3	Ligier JS P325	CAT; 9	LEC; 3	LMS; 1; 8	LMS; 2; 5	SPA; 6	SIL; 9	ALG; Ret	8th	36
