= Rocco Mazzola =

Italian racing driver (born 2005)

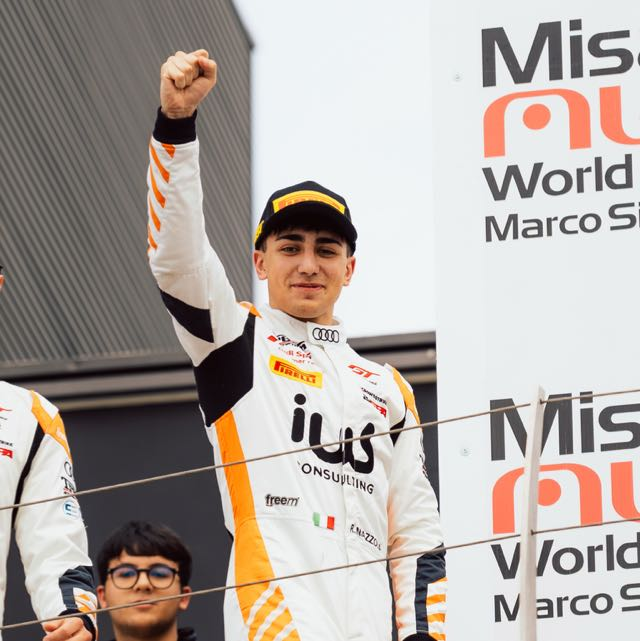
- Mazzola in 2025
- Nationality: (Italy) Italian
- Born: 24 September 2005 (age 21) Potenza, Italy
- Categorisation: FIA Silver

Championship titles
- 2025 2022 2022: Italian GT Championship Endurance Cup – GT3; Italian GT Championship Sprint Cup – GT Cup Pro-Am; Italian GT Championship Endurance Cup – GT Cup Pro-Am

Rocco Mazzola (born 24 September 2005) is an Italian racing driver who last competed in the GT World Challenge Europe Endurance Cup and the Italian GT Championship for Tresor Attempto Racing.

== Personal life ==
Mazzola is the nephew of namesake Rocco Mazzola (1932–2012), an Italian boxer who won the 1957 light heavyweight and 1961 heavyweight Italian titles.

== Career ==
Mazzola began karting at the age of eight. During his karting career, Mazzola most notably secured the 2019 ROK Cup Italia title in Junior ROK and won the 2020 Coppa Italia ACI Karting in X30 Senior. In 2021, Mazzola made his car racing debut, competing in the Italian Sport Prototype Championship for Marchetti by Emotion. In his only season in the series, Mazzola scored third-place finishes at Misano, Imola and Vallelunga en route to a sixth-place overall points finish and the rookie title. Towards the end of the year, Mazzola made a one-off appearance in the Italian F4 Championship for Cram Motorsport.

Switching to GT racing for 2022, Mazzola joined Ferrari customer team Easy Race to compete in the GT Cup Pro-Am class of the Italian GT Championship Sprint and Endurance Cups alongside Luigi Coluccio. In the Endurance Cup, Mazzola won at Pergusa and Vallelunga to clinch the title, whereas in the Sprint Cup, Mazzola took six podiums to seal a double title win. Moving up to GT3 competition in 2023, Mazzola joined Ferrari-fielding Best Lap to compete in the Sprint Cup, taking a lone Pro-Am podium at Monza to take sixth in points. During 2023, Mazzola made a one-off appearance in the Ferrari Challenge Europe at Misano, in which he finished second in race two in the Trofeo Pirelli class.

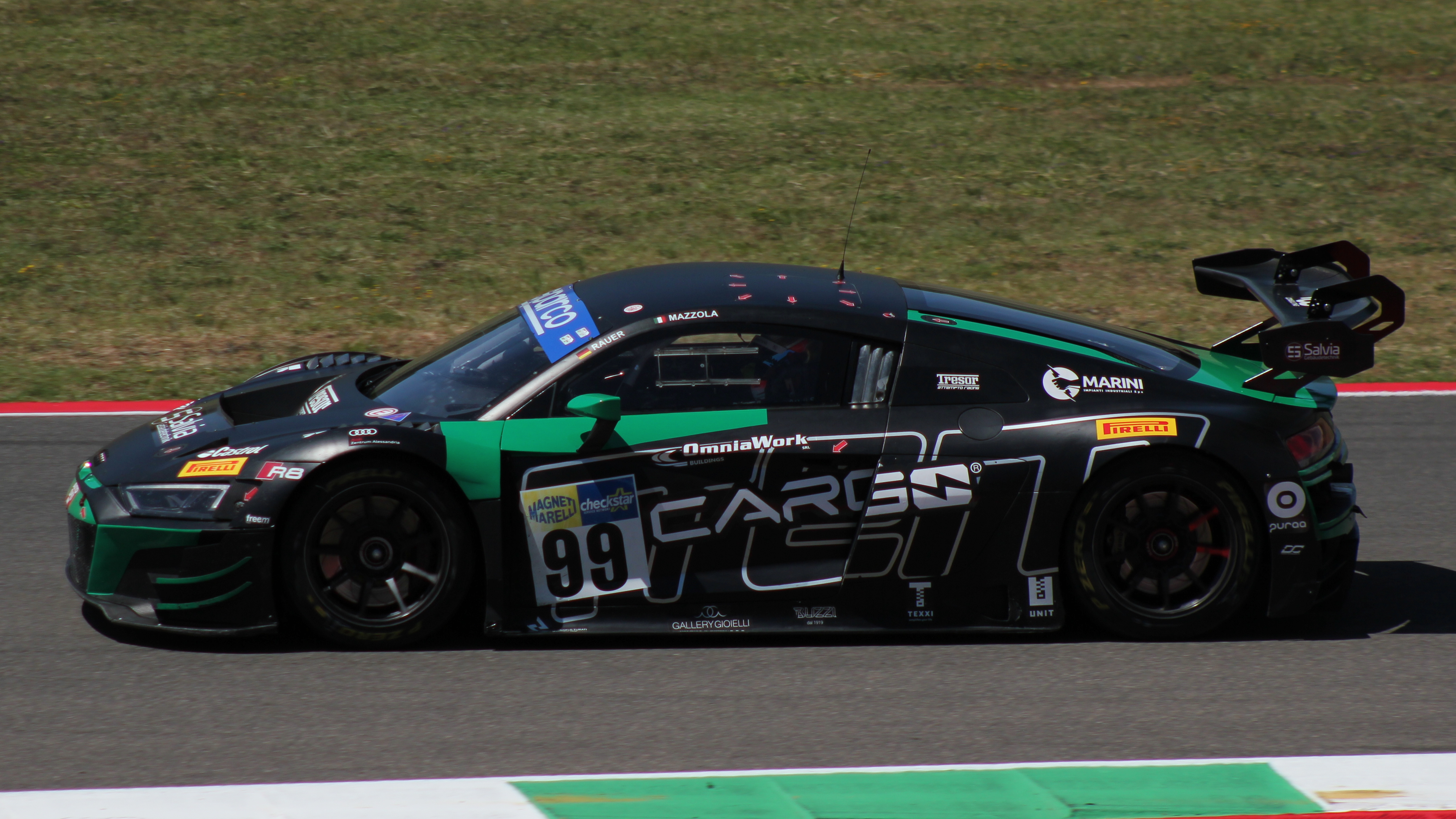
Mazzola won his third Italian GT title in 2025, driving a Tresor Attempto Audi.

Continuing in Italian GT for 2024, Mazzola switched to Tresor Audi Sport Italia to compete in both the Sprint and Endurance Cups. In the former, Mazzola won at Mugello en route to runner-up honours in GT3 alongside Pietro Delli Guanti, whereas in the latter he took a lone podium at Vallelunga to take fourth in the overall standings. At the end of the year, Mazzola made his GT World Challenge Europe Endurance Cup, driving an Audi R8 LMS Evo II for Tresor Attempto Racing at Jeddah. Joining Attempto to continue in Italian GT for 2025, Mazzola took a lone Sprint Cup at Imola alongside Fabio Rauer to end the year sixth in points. The pair joined Riccardo Cazzaniga in the Endurance Cup, winning the season opener at Misano and taking a podium at Imola to secure the overall title. During 2025, Mazzola made select appearances in the GT World Challenge Europe Endurance Cup for the same team.

In 2026, Mazzola continued with Attempto for a full campaign in the Silver Cup class of the GT World Challenge Europe Endurance Cup, as well as the Italian GT Championship Sprint and Endurance Cups. In the former, Mazzola and his teammates Ariel Levi and Sebastian Øgaard went from 29th to first to take a shock overall win at the 3 Hours of Monza, before taking a class podium at Algarve and securing third in the Silver Cup points. In Italian GT's Sprint Cup, Mazzola was 12th overall with a best result of fourth in race one at Vallelunga.

== Karting record ==
=== Karting career summary ===
Season	Series	Team	Position
2015	WSK Super Master Series – 60 Mini	Raffaele Mazzola	21st
2016	WSK Champions Cup – 60 Mini	Raffaele Mazzola	71st
2016	South Garda Winter Cup – Mini ROK	Raffaele Mazzola	14th
2016	WSK Super Master Series – 60 Mini (Note: Mazzola competed as a Privateer in rounds 1–2 and for DK Racing in round 3.)	Raffaele Mazzola	46th
2017	WSK Champions Cup – 60 Mini	Raffaele Mazzola	34th
2017	WSK Super Master Series – 60 Mini	Raffaele Mazzola	117th
2017	Trofeo Invernal Ayrton Senna – 60 Mini		8th
2017	Italian Karting Championship – 60 Mini		15th
2017	WSK Final Cup – 60 Mini	EvoKart Srl	93rd
2017	ROK Cup International Final – 60 Mini	Raffaele Mazzola	19th
2018	WSK Champions Cup – 60 Mini	EvoKart Srl	NC
2018	WSK Super Master Series – 60 Mini	EvoKart Srl; Italcorse Racing Team (Note: Mazzola competed for EvoKart Srl in rounds 1–2 and for Italcorse Racing Team in rounds 3–4.)	8th
2018	South Garda Winter Cup – Mini ROK	EvoKart	18th
2018	Italian Karting Championship – 60 Mini	Italcorse Racing Team	15th
2019	South Garda Winter Cup – OK-J	Motorsport Revolution	58th
2019	WSK Super Master Series – OK-J	Giugliano Kart	113rd
2019	Trofeo Delle Industrie – OK-J	Newman Motorsport	NC
2019	WSK Final Cup – OK-J	Newman Motorsport	NC
2019	ROK Cup Superfinal – Junior ROK	Zanchi Motorsport	7th
2020	Italian Karting Championship – X30 Junior		2nd
2021	WSK Champions Cup – OK	Raffaele Mazzola	NC
2021	WSK Super Master Series – OK	Team Driver Racing Kart	69th

== Racing record ==
=== Racing career summary ===
Season	Series	Team	Races	Wins	Poles	F/Laps	Podiums	Points	Position
2021	Italian Sport Prototype Championship	Marchetti by Emotion	12	0	2	0	3	60	6th
2021	Italian F4 Championship	Cram Motorsport	3	0	0	0	0	0	43rd
2022	Italian GT Championship Sprint Cup – GT Cup Pro-Am	Easy Race	8	0	0	0	6	88	**1st**
2022	Italian GT Championship Endurance Cup – GT Cup Pro-Am	Easy Race	4	2	0	0	4	55	**1st**
2023	Italian GT Championship Sprint Cup – GT3	Best Lap	8	0	0	0	0	22	9th
2023	Italian GT Championship Sprint Cup – GT3 Pro-Am	Best Lap	8	0	0	0	1	73	6th
2023	Ferrari Challenge Europe – Trofeo Pirelli	Radicci Automobili	2	0	0	0	1	19	8th
2024	Italian GT Championship Sprint Cup – GT3	Tresor Audi Sport Italia	8	1	0	0	3	81	**2nd**
2024	Italian GT Championship Endurance Cup – GT3	Tresor Audi Sport Italia	4	0	0	0	1	43	4th
2024	GT World Challenge Europe Endurance Cup	Tresor Attempto Racing	1	0	0	0	0	0	NC
2024	GT World Challenge Europe Endurance Cup – Silver	Tresor Attempto Racing	1	0	0	0	0	0	NC
2025	Italian GT Championship Endurance Cup – GT3	Tresor Attempto Racing	4	1	1	0	2	67	**1st**
2025	Italian GT Championship Sprint Cup – GT3	Tresor Attempto Racing	8	1	0	0	1	58	6th
2025	GT World Challenge Europe Endurance Cup	Tresor Attempto Racing	2	0	0	0	0	0	NC
2025	GT World Challenge Europe Endurance Cup – Gold	Tresor Attempto Racing	2	0	0	0	0	2	20th
2026	GT World Challenge Europe Endurance Cup	Tresor Attempto Racing	5	1	0	0	1	25	9th
2026	GT World Challenge Europe Endurance Cup – Silver	Tresor Attempto Racing	5	1	0	0	2	59	**3rd**
2026	Italian GT Championship Sprint Cup – GT3	Tresor Attempto Racing	8	0	0	0	0	30	12th
2026	Italian GT Championship Endurance Cup – GT3	Tresor Attempto Racing	2	0	0	0	0	0	NC
2026	Italian GT Championship Endurance Cup – GT3 Pro-Am	Tresor Attempto Racing	1	0	0	0	0	3	NC

=== Complete GT World Challenge Europe results ===
==== GT World Challenge Europe Endurance Cup ====
(key) (Races in bold indicate pole position) (Races in italics indicate fastest lap)

Year	Team	Car	Class	1	2	3	4	5	6	7	Pos.	Points
2024	Tresor Attempto Racing	Audi R8 LMS Evo II	Silver	LEC	SPA; 6H	SPA; 12H	SPA; 24H	NÜR	MNZ	JED; 24	NC	0
2025	Tresor Attempto Racing	Audi R8 LMS Evo II	Gold	LEC	MNZ	SPA; 6H; 58	SPA; 12H; 44	SPA; 24H; 47†	NÜR	CAT; Ret	20th	2
2026	Tresor Attempto Racing	Audi R8 LMS Evo II	Silver	LEC; 21	MNZ; 1	SPA; 6H; 67†	SPA; 12H; 67†	SPA; 24H; Ret	NÜR; 37	ALG; 15	3rd	59

* Season still in progress.
