= 2023 Ferrari Challenge Europe =

Single-marque motorsport championship

The 2023 Ferrari Challenge Europe was the 31st season of Ferrari Challenge Europe and its predecessor Ferrari Challenge Italy. The season consists of 7 rounds, starting at the Circuit Ricardo Tormo on 24 March 2023 and ending at Mugello Circuit during the Ferrari World Finals on 30 October 2023.

== Calendar ==
The season consists of 14 races run at seven different circuits in Europe.

Rnd.	Circuit	Dates	Map
1	Circuit Ricardo Tormo, Cheste, Spain	24–26 March	2023 Ferrari Challenge Europe is located in Europe
2	Misano World Circuit Marco Simoncelli, Misano Adriatico, Italy	21–23 April	2023 Ferrari Challenge Europe is located in Europe
3	Red Bull Ring, Spielberg, Austria	12–14 May	2023 Ferrari Challenge Europe is located in Europe
4	Circuit de la Sarthe, Le Mans, France	7–10 June	2023 Ferrari Challenge Europe is located in Europe
5	Circuito do Estoril, Estoril, Portugal	14–19 July	2023 Ferrari Challenge Europe is located in Europe
6	Circuit de Spa-Francorchamps, Stavelot, Belgium	15–17 September	2023 Ferrari Challenge Europe is located in Europe
7	Autodromo Internazionale del Mugello, Scarperia e San Piero, Italy	24–30 October	2023 Ferrari Challenge Europe is located in Europe

== Entry list ==
=== Trofeo Pirelli ===
Team	No.	Driver	Class	Rounds
(France) Charles Pozzi GT Racing	1	(Germany) Franz Engstler	Pro-Am	All
(France) Charles Pozzi GT Racing	6	(France) Thomas Neubauer	Pro	4
(Japan) Rosso Scuderia	2	(Japan) Yudai Uchida	Pro-Am	7
(Japan) Rosso Scuderia	501	(Japan) Yudai Uchida	Pro-Am	4
(Japan) Rosso Scuderia	14	(Japan) Nobuhiro Imada	Pro-Am	7
(Japan) Rosso Scuderia	504	(Japan) Nobuhiro Imada	Pro-Am	4
(Italy) CDP	3	(Italy) Max Mugelli	Pro	All
(Italy) CDP	50	(Italy) David Gostner	Pro-Am	All
(Italy) CDP	69	(Italy) Marco Zanasi	Pro-Am	2, 5, 7
(Denmark) Formula Racing	4	(Italy) Philippe Prette	Pro-Am	1–3, 5–7
(Denmark) Formula Racing	10	(Denmark) Kim Eriksen	Pro-Am	All
(Denmark) Formula Racing	47	(Denmark) Andreas Bogh-Sorensen	Pro-Am	All
(Denmark) Formula Racing	98	(Denmark) Claus Zibrandtsen	Pro-Am	6
(Germany) Gohm Motorsport	5	(Germany) Adrian Sutil	Pro	1–3, 5–7
(Germany) Gohm Motorsport	15	(Italy) Germano Salernitano	Pro-Am	7
(Germany) Gohm Motorsport	21	(Poland) Szymon Ładniak	Pro	All
(Egypt) Ezz Elarab Automotive Company	7	(Egypt) Mohamed Hamdy	Pro-Am	5–7
(Egypt) Ezz Elarab Automotive Company	37	(Egypt) Mohamed Hamdy	Pro-Am	1–4
(Switzerland) Kessel Racing	8	(Switzerland) Nicolò Rosi	Pro-Am	All
(Switzerland) Kessel Racing	27	(Switzerland) Dennis De Marco	Pro	1–2
(Germany) Penske Sportswagen Hamburg	9	(Germany) Danilo Del Favero	Pro-Am	All
(Belgium) Garage Zenith - Ecurie Francorchamps	11	(Belgium) Nicola D'Aniello	Pro-Am	6–7
(Italy) Radicci Automobili	12	(Italy) Giammarco Marzialetti	Pro-Am	1–2, 7
(Italy) Radicci Automobili	19	(Italy) Eliseo Donno	Pro	All
(Italy) Radicci Automobili	23	(Italy) Rocco Mazzola	Pro	2
(United States) Ferrari of Central Florida	22	(United States) Enzo Potolicchio	Pro-Am	6
(United Kingdom) Graypaul Birmingham	24	(United Kingdom) Lucky Khera	Pro-Am	All
(United Kingdom) Meridien Modena - FF Corse	26	(United Kingdom) James Owen	Pro-Am	All
(Germany) MERTEL Motorsport	42	(Germany) Matthias Tomann	Pro-Am	7
(Germany) MERTEL Motorsport	89	(Netherlands) Leon Rijnbeek	Pro-Am	6
(Czech Republic) Scuderia Praha	67	(Czech Republic) Josef Král	Pro	2
(Czech Republic) Scuderia Praha	77	(Grenada) Ruslan Sadreev	Pro-Am	5–7
(Czech Republic) Scuderia Praha	92	(Czech Republic) Hendrik Viol	Pro-Am	5–7
(Germany) Lueg Sportivo	71	(Germany) Otto Blank	Pro-Am	All
(United Kingdom) HR Owen - FF Corse	73	(United Kingdom) Thomas Fleming	Pro	All
(United Kingdom) HR Owen	416	(Netherlands) Han Sikkens	Pro-Am	4
(United Kingdom) HR Owen	476	(Saudi Arabia) Faisal Al-Faisal	Pro-Am	4
(Italy) Rossocorsa	80	(Venezuela) Angelo Fontana	Pro-Am	6
(Germany) Riller und Schnauck	81	(Germany) Nick Halle	Pro-Am	All
(Germany) Riller und Schnauck	88	(Germany) Amin Arefpour	Pro-Am	1–5, 7
(Luxembourg) FML - D2P	82	(Czech Republic) Martin Havas	Pro-Am	6
(Switzerland) Emil Frey	85	(Germany) Hanno Laskowski	Pro-Am	All
(Hungary) Rossocorsa - Ferrari Budapest	86	(Hungary) Bence Válint	Pro	2–7
(United States) Continental Autosports	204	(United States) Tony Davis	Pro-Am	4
(United States) Wide World Ferrari	211	(United States) Jason McCarthy	Pro-Am	4
(United States) Ferrari Beverly Hills	221	(United States) Mathew Kurzejewski	Pro-Am	4
(United States) The Collection	288	(Brazil) Custodio Toledo	Pro-Am	4
(United Kingdom) Charles Hurst	404	(United Kingdom) Andrew Morrow	Pro-Am	4
(United Kingdom) Graypaul Nottingham	451	(United Kingdom) Carl Cavers	Pro-Am	4

=== Coppa Shell ===
Team	No.	Driver	Class	Rounds
(Switzerland) Kessel Racing	100	(United States) Stephen Earle	S-Am	5–7
(Switzerland) Kessel Racing	124	(Singapore) Kirk Baerwaldt	S-Am	All
(Switzerland) Kessel Racing	133	(Turkey) Murat Cuhadaroglu	S	7
(Switzerland) Kessel Racing	140	(Italy) Pino Frascaro	S-Am	All
(Switzerland) Kessel Racing	177	(Netherlands) Fons Scheltema	S	All
(Italy) Sa.Mo.Car	101	(Italy) Paolo Scudieri	S-Am	All
(Germany) Autohaus Ulrich	103	(Germany) 'Boris Gideon'	S-Am	1–3, 5–7
(Japan) Cornes Motors Shiba	105	(Japan) Motohiko Isozaki	S-Am	All
(United Kingdom) Stratstone Manchester	106	(United Kingdom) Paul Hogarth	S-Am	6
(United Kingdom) Stratstone Manchester	406	(United Kingdom) Paul Hogarth	S-Am	4
(Italy) Rossocorsa	107	(Italy) Stefano Marazzi	S-Am	All
(Italy) Rossocorsa	118	(United States) James Weiland	S	7
(Italy) Rossocorsa	119	(Mexico) Luis Perusquia	S-Am	All
(Germany) Gohm Motorsport	109	(Austria) Ernst Kirchmayr	S	6–7
(Germany) Gohm Motorsport	128	(Sweden) Christian Kinch	S	All
(Germany) Gohm Motorsport	136	(Austria) Alexander Nussbaumer	S	All
(Germany) Gohm Motorsport	152	(Germany) Thomas Lofflad	S	5–7
(Germany) Gohm Motorsport	159	(Germany) Matthias Moser	S-Am	6
(Germany) MERTEL Motorsport	111	(Germany) Martinus Richter	S-Am	All
(Denmark) Formula Racing	113	(Denmark) Henrik Kamstrup	S-Am	All
(Denmark) Formula Racing	121	(Denmark) Peter Christensen	S	All
(Denmark) Formula Racing	170	(Japan) Ken Abe	S	7
(Denmark) Formula Racing	198	(Canada) Eric Cheung	S	All
(Japan) Cornes Osaka	114	(Japan) Masaru Yoneda	S-Am	7
(Japan) Cornes Osaka	116	(Japan) Kanji Yagura	S	7
(Japan) Cornes Osaka	135	(Japan) "Baby Kei"	S-Am	7
(Netherlands) Kroymans - Race Art	117	(Netherlands) Roger Grouwels	S	All
(Belgium) Scuderia FMA	120	(Belgium) Guy Fawe	S	6–7
(United Kingdom) Graypaul Birmingham	123	(United Kingdom) Paul Simmerson	S-Am	6
(United Kingdom) Graypaul Birmingham	477	(United Kingdom) Paul Simmerson	S-Am	4
(Sweden) Scuderia Autoropa	126	(Sweden) Joakim Olander	S	All
(Sweden) Scuderia Autoropa	199	(Sweden) Ingvar Mattsson	S	All
(Austria) Baron Motorsport	127	(Sweden) Tommy Lindroth	S-Am	All
(Austria) Baron Motorsport	131	(Austria) Christian Windischberger	S-Am	3
(Japan) European Version	129	(Japan) Masafumi Hiwatashi	S-Am	7
(Switzerland) Emil Frey	134	(Turkey) Mutlu Tasev	S-Am	All
(Switzerland) Emil Frey	183	(Germany) Christian Herdt-Wipper	S	All
(Japan) Rosso Scuderia	139	(Japan) Yasutaka Shirasaki	S	7
(Germany) Moll Sportwagen Hamburg	150	(Germany) Werner Genter	S-Am	6–7
(United Kingdom) Graypaul Nottingham	151	(United Kingdom) John Dhillon	S	All
(Italy) CDP	161	(Italy) Thomas Gostner	S	All
(Italy) CDP	173	(Italy) Corinna Gostner	S	All
(Italy) CDP	193	(Italy) Manuela Gostner	S	All
CTF Group China	168	(China) Yanbin Xing	S	7
CTF Group China	169	(China) Yansheng Liang	S-Am	7
(Italy) Rossocorsa - Pellin Racing	102	(United States) Thor Haugen	S	6
(Italy) Rossocorsa - Pellin Racing	130	(United States) Lisa Clark	S-Am	3, 6
(Italy) Rossocorsa - Pellin Racing	172	(Italy) Giuseppe Ramelli	S-Am	1–3, 6–7
(Germany) Lueg Sportivo	178	(Germany) Axel Sartingen	S	All
(Italy) Radicci Automobili	181	(Italy) Maurizio Pitorri	S-Am	1
(Monaco) Scuderia Monte-Carlo	182	(Monaco) Willem van der Vorm	S	All
(Germany) Eberlein Automobile	188	(Germany) Josef Schumacher	S-Am	All
(France) Charles Pozzi GT Racing	190	(Germany) Roland Hertner	S-Am	All
The Collection	307	(United States) Rey Acosta	S	4
(United States) Foreign Cars Italia	321	(United States) Roy Carroll	S	4
(United States) Ferrari Beverly Hills	326	(United States) Eric Marston	S	4
(United States) Ferrari Beverly Hills	327	(United States) Lisa Clark	S-Am	4
(United States) Ferrari of Seattle	332	(United States) Yahn Bernier	S	4
(United States) Ferrari Silicon Valley	358	(United States) Bruce Cleveland	S-Am	4
(United States) Ferrari of Austin	363	(United States) Dan Cornish	S-Am	4
(United States) Ferrari of San Francisco	366	(United States) Brad Fauvre	S	4
(United States) Ferrari of Denver	373	(United States) Sureel Choksi	S	4
(United States) Ferrari of Atlanta	376	(United States) Lance Cawley	S-Am	4
(United Kingdom) HR Owen	407	(United Kingdom) Jonathan Satchell	S-Am	4
(United Kingdom) Maranello Sales	415	(United Kingdom) Stuart Marston	S-Am	4
(United Kingdom) Maranello Sales	466	(United Kingdom) Julian Dye	S-Am	4

== Standings ==
=== Trofeo Pirelli ===
Pos.	Driver	VAL (Spain)		MIS (Italy)		RBR (Austria)		LMS (France)	EST (Portugal)		SPA (Belgium)		MUG (Italy)		Points
Pos.	Driver	R1	R2	R1	R2	R1	R2	R1	R1	R2	R1	R2	R1	R2	Points
Pro
1	(Italy) Eliseo Donno	1	1	2	7	1	1	3	4	2	1	4	2	3	172
2	(United Kingdom) Thomas Fleming	2	4	1	DSQ	3	4	4	1	1	2	1	3	1	160
3	(Hungary) Bence Válint			7	1	2	2	2			4	2	4	2	103
4	(Italy) Max Mugelli	3	2	4	4	5	5	6	3	3	6	5	6	5	103
5	(Poland) Szymon Ładniak	4	3	8	5	6	6	5	2	4	5	6	5	4	92
6	(Germany) Adrian Sutil			6	3	4	3				3	3	1	6	75
7	(France) Thomas Neubauer							1							23
8	(Italy) Rocco Mazzola			5	2										19
9	(Czech Republic) Josef Král			3	6										15
10	(Switzerland) Dennis De Marco	5	5												13
Pro-Am
1	(Germany) Franz Engstler	1	1	1	1	2	1	21	1	1	1	1	8	Ret	168
2	(Germany) Hanno Laskowski	3	3	2	3	1	3	11	3	2			9	7	99
3	(Switzerland) Nicolò Rosi	4	2	3	2			9	4	6			3	5	75
4	(Czech Republic) Hendrik Viol								9	4	2	2	2	4	55
5	(United Kingdom) James Owen	7	Ret	4	6	DSQ	5	10	2	5	6	14	Ret	Ret	49
6	(Germany) Danilo Del Favero	6	4	7	10	5	7	14	11	Ret	5	5	6	6	49
7	(Japan) Yudai Uchida							5					1	1	42
8	(Italy) Marco Zanasi			9	5				12	3			4	2	41
9	(Italy) David Gostner			6	7	11	2	2							39
10	(United Kingdom) Lucky Khera	5	5	8	4			7	5	7					37
11	(Italy) Philippe Prette	2	11			3	4								32
12	(Egypt) Mohamed Hamdy	8	6	Ret	12	4	Ret	16	Ret	Ret			14	3	31
13	(United States) Mathew Kurzejewski							1							23
14	(Denmark) Kim Eriksen	9	7	10	9	6	6	15	8	8	8	8	Ret	12	21
15	(Denmark) Claus Zibrandtsen										3	4			19
16	(United States) Enzo Potolicchio										4	3			19
17	(Japan) Nobuhiro Imada							3					7	10	16
18	(Denmark) Andreas Bogh-Sorensen	10	8			7		12			7	7	DSQ	9	12
19	(Saudi Arabia) Faisal Al-Faisal							4							11
20	(United Kingdom) Andrew Morrow							8					5	8	11
21	(Italy) Giammarco Marzialetti	13	Ret	5	8								Ret	11	10
22	(Germany) Otto Blank					9	9	17	6	9	9	9	11	13	9
23	(Germany) Amin Arefpour	12	9	11	11	8	8	20	10	11	Ret	13		16	8
24	(Netherlands) Han Sikkens							6							7
25	(Venezuela) Angelo Fontana										Ret	6			5
26	(Grenada) Ruslan Sadreev								7	10	11	10	13	14	5
27	(Germany) Nick Halle	11	10			10	10	18	DNS				12	19	5
28	(Belgium) Nicola D'Aniello										12	12	15	17	2
29	(Netherlands) Leon Rijnbeek										10	15			1
30	(Germany) Matthias Tomann												10	15	1
31	(Czech Republic) Martin Havas										Ret	11			1
32	(United States) Tony Davis							13							1
33	(Italy) Germano Salernitano												16	18	1
34	(United States) Jason McCarthy							19							1
35	(Brazil) Custodio Toledo							Ret							1
36	(United Kingdom) Carl Cavers							Ret							1
