= Szymon Ładniak =

Polish racing driver

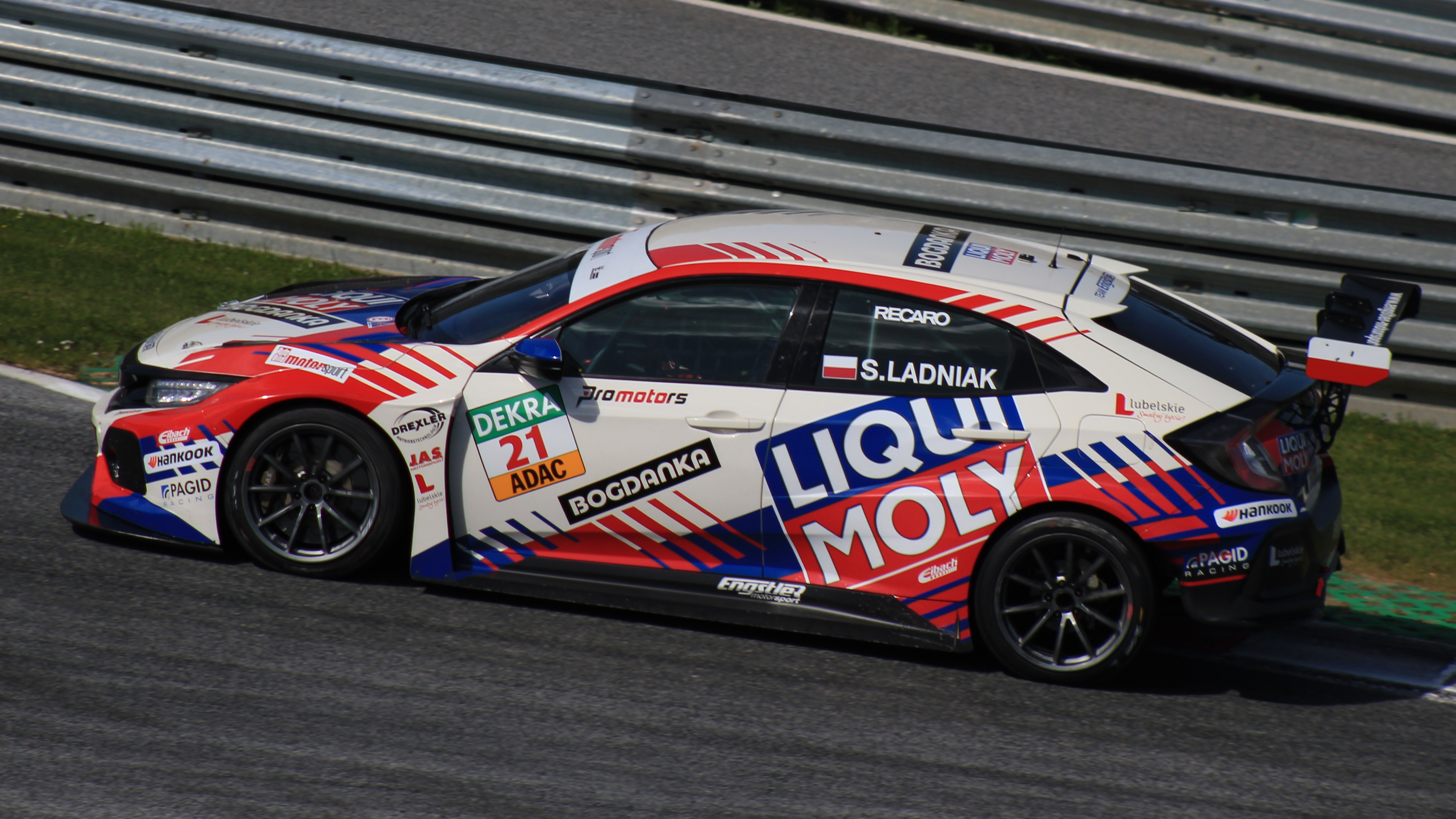
- Ładniak racing for Engstler Honda Type R Liqui Moly Racing Team at Red Bull Ring in 2022
- Nationality: (Poland) Polish
- Born: Szymon Edward Ładniak; 15 February 2003 (age 23) Lublin, Poland

ADAC GT Masters career
- Debut season: 2025
- Current team: Liqui Moly Team Engstler by GRT
- Categorisation: FIA Silver
- Starts: 4
- Wins: 0
- Podiums: 0
- Poles: 0
- Fastest laps: 0
- Best finish: TBA in 2025

Szymon Edward Ładniak (born 15 February 2003) is a Polish racing driver, currently competing in the 2025 ADAC GT Masters with Liqui Moly Team Engstler by GRT.

== Career ==
=== Early career ===
Ładniak began his racing career as a 14-year-old in 2017, when he competed in the Kia Lotos Race championship. At the Autodrom Most round of the series he achieved his only podium of the season. The following year, he switched to Renault Clio Cup Central Europe. Over the course of the season, he scored 94 points and finished in 17th overall. He stayed in the championship for 2019, and that time he finished 11th in the final standings.

=== Touring cars ===
For the 2020 season Ładniak joined GT2 Motorsport for the TCR Eastern Europe Trophy. His best result of the year was a fifth position at the Hungaroring. He also took part in three rounds of ADAC TCR Germany Touring Car Championship as a guest, as well as a round of Tourenwagen Meisterschaft Österreich.

2021 saw Ładniak again competing in ADAC TCR Germany Touring Car Championship, this time full season. He competed for three teams: JP Motorsports, Wimmer Werk Motorsport and Halder Motorsport. With the latter team he scored his only podium of the season at the Nürburgring. He finished the year in 13th overall with 70 points to his name.

He stayed in the ADAC TCR Germany Touring Car Championship for 2022, this time with the Engstler Honda Type R Liqui Moly Racing Team team. During that season, he won three races and stood on the podium three more times, to finish third in the overall championship. He also won the Junior classification of the championship.

=== Ferrari Challenge ===
For 2023, Ładniak made the switch from touring cars to Ferrari Challenge, as he decided to race in the Ferrari Challenge Europe Trofeo Pirelli class with the Gohm - Scuderia GT team. He began the season at Circuit Ricardo Tormo with a podium in the second race. He scored his second, and last podium of the season at Algarve International Circuit. He concluded the season in fifth position. Ładniak also took part in the Ferrari Challenge Finali Mondiali at Mugello Circuit, where he finished in fourth.

=== LMP3 ===
Le Mans Cup was the series that Ładniak chose to compete in for the 2024 season. He competed there in a Ligier JS P320 of Bretton Racing. He was scheduled to start the season at the Circuit de Barcelona-Catalunya, but he was replaced by Axel Gnos, after safety concerns were expressed to the team by the race director after the collective test on Wednesday. Ładniak said that the withdrawal was caused by him not getting the FIA Silver License in time. He stayed in Le Mans Cup for two more rounds, where he did not score points. After the third round, he was replaced in the team.

=== GT3 ===
After an unsuccessful campaign in Le Mans Cup, Ładniak switched to GT3 cars. He came back to Engstler Motorsport, under a Liqui Moly Team Engstler by GRT alias to compete in the ADAC GT Masters.

== Racing record ==
=== Racing career summary ===
Season	Series	Team	Races	Wins	Poles	F/Laps	Podiums	Points	Position
2017	Kia Lotos Race	BM Racing Team	12	0	0	0	1	452	11th
2018	Renault Clio Cup Central Europe	BM Racing Team	14	0	0	0	0	94	17th
2018	Wyścigowe Samochodowe Mistrzostwa Polski – D4 3500	BM Racing Team	2	0	0	0	1	93	4th
2019	Renault Clio Cup Central Europe	BM Racing Team	14	0	0	0	0	117	11th
2020	ADAC TCR Germany Touring Car Championship	GT2 Motorsport	6	0	0	0	0	0	NC†
2020	TCR Eastern Europe Trophy	GT2 Motorsport	8	0	0	0	0	24	11th
2020	Tourenwagen Meisterschaft Österreich – Div 3	GT2 Motorsport	2	0	0	0	0	12	13th
2021	ADAC TCR Germany Touring Car Championship	JP Motorsport	6	0	0	0	0	70	13th
2021	ADAC TCR Germany Touring Car Championship	Wimmer Werk Motorsport	2	0	0	0	0	70	13th
2021	ADAC TCR Germany Touring Car Championship	Halder Motorsport	4	0	0	0	1	70	13th
2022	ADAC TCR Germany Touring Car Championship	Engstler Honda Type R Liqui Moly Racing Team	14	3	2	3	6	311	**3rd**
2023	Ferrari Challenge Europe – Trofeo Pirelli Pro	Gohm Motorsport	13	0	0	0	2	92	5th
2023	Ferrari Challenge World Final – Trofeo Pirelli	Gohm Motorsport	1	0	0	0	0	NC	4th
2024	Le Mans Cup – LMP3	Bretton Racing	3	0	0	0	0	0	NC
2025	ADAC GT Masters	Liqui Moly Team Engstler by GRT	6	0	0	0	0	20	17th

† As Ładniak was a guest driver, he was ineligible to score points.
* Season in progress.

=== Complete Ferrari Challenge Europe results ===
(key) (Races in bold indicate pole position) (Races in italics indicate fastest lap)

Year	Class	Team	1	2	3	4	5	6	7	8	9	10	11	12	13	DC	Points
2023	Trofeo Pirelli Pro	Gohm - Scuderia GT	CRT; 1; 4	CRT; 2; 3	MIS; 1; 8	MIS; 2; 5	RBR; 1; 6	RBR; 2; 6	LMS; 5	EST; 1; 2	EST; 2; 4	SPA; 1; 5	SPA; 2; 6	MUG; 1; 5	MUG; 2; 4	5th	92

=== Complete Le Mans Cup results ===
(key) (Races in bold indicate pole position) (Races in italics indicate fastest lap)

Year	Class	Team	1	2	3	4	5	6	7	DC	Points
2024	LMP3	Bretton Racing	BAR; WD	LEC; Ret	LMS; 1; 28	LMS; 2 Ret	SPA	MUG	POR	NC	0

=== Complete ADAC GT Masters results ===
(key) (Races in bold indicate pole position) (Races in italics indicate fastest lap)

Year	Team	1	2	3	4	5	6	7	8	9	10	11	12	DC	Points
2025	Liqui Moly Team Engstler by GRT	LAU; 1; 11	LAU; 2 Ret	ZAN; 1; 12	ZAN; 2; 12	NÜR; 1; 13	NÜR; 2; 14	SAL; 1	SAL; 2	RBR; 1	RBR; 2	HOC; 1	HOC; 2	16th*	20*

* Season in progress.
