= Eliseo Donno =

Italian racing driver (born 2005)

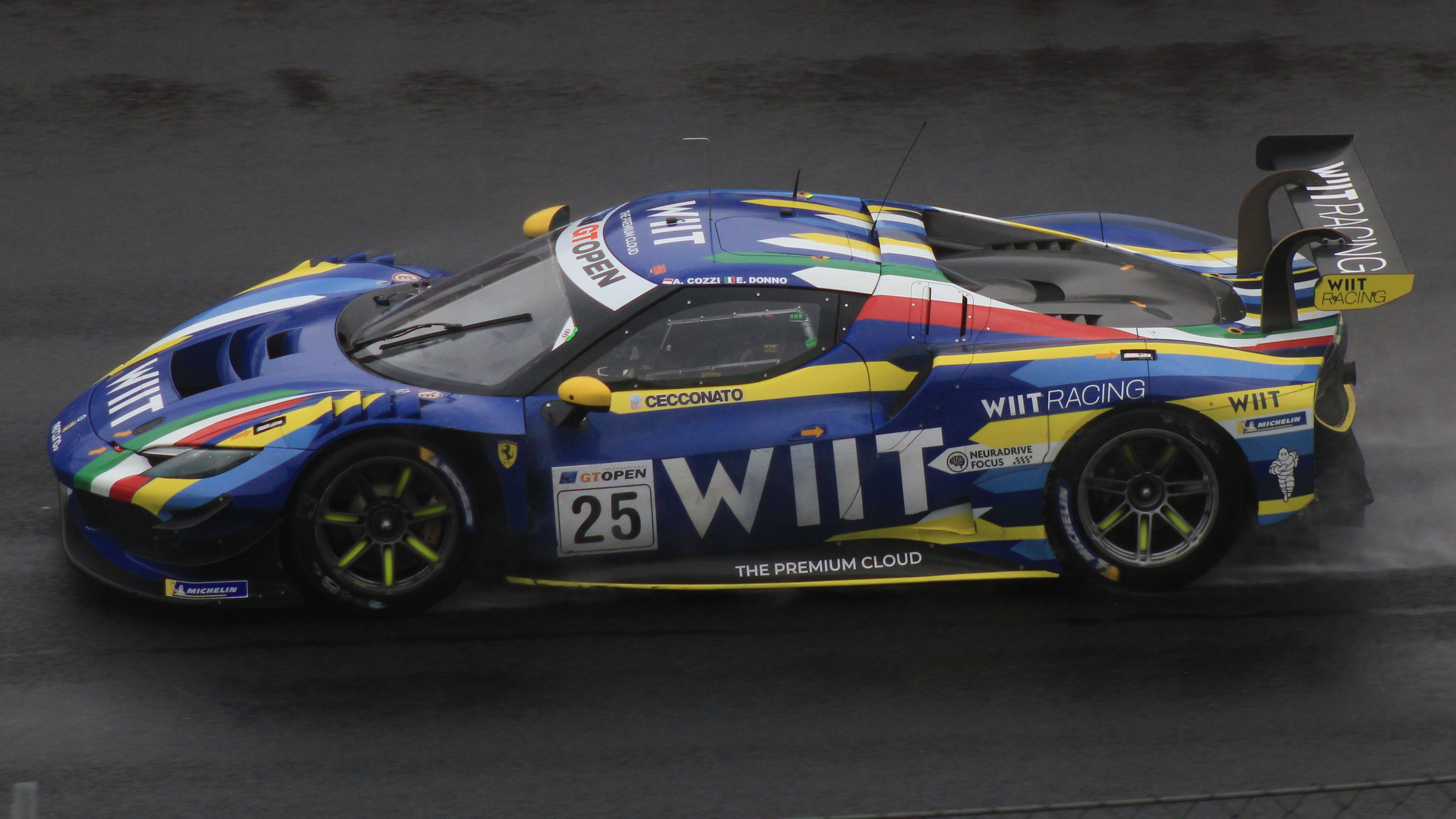
- Donno in 2024
- Nationality: (Italy) Italian
- Born: 1 March 2005 (age 21) Corigliano d'Otranto, Italy

Le Mans Cup career
- Debut season: 2025
- Current team: AF Corse
- Categorisation: FIA Silver (until 2025); FIA Gold (2026–)
- Car number: 51
- Starts: 12
- Wins: 0
- Podiums: 6
- Poles: 1
- Fastest laps: 4
- Best finish: 1st (GT3) in 2025

Championship titles
- 2025 2023: Le Mans Cup - GT3; Ferrari Challenge Europe - Trofeo Pirelli

Eliseo Donno (born 1 March 2005 in Corigliano d'Otranto) is an Italian racing driver who last competed in the GT3 class of the Le Mans Cup for AF Corse. He is the 2023 Ferrari Challenge Europe - Trofeo Pirelli champion.

== Early career ==
=== Ferrari Challenge ===
After a karting career headlined by winning the 2021 Italian Karting Championship in the Rok Senior class, in 2022, Donno stepped up to GT Racing, competing in Ferrari Challenge Europe and Italian GT Championships. Joining the former from the Hungaroring round, Donno won at Mugello and Imola to finish fourth in the standings. Racing on a part-time basis in the Italian championship, Donno won from pole overall at Mugello but wasn't eligible for points as he only raced in two out of four events.

Returning to Ferrari Challenge for 2023, Donno won both races at Valencia to kick off the season. After finishing second at Misano, Donno won both Red Bull Ring races to extend his championship lead. Following three races where he finished no lower than fourth, Donno won the opening race at Spa to maintain his lead. Two races later, in the opening race at Mugello, Donno clinched the title with one race to spare by finishing second.

== GT3 career ==
=== 2024 ===
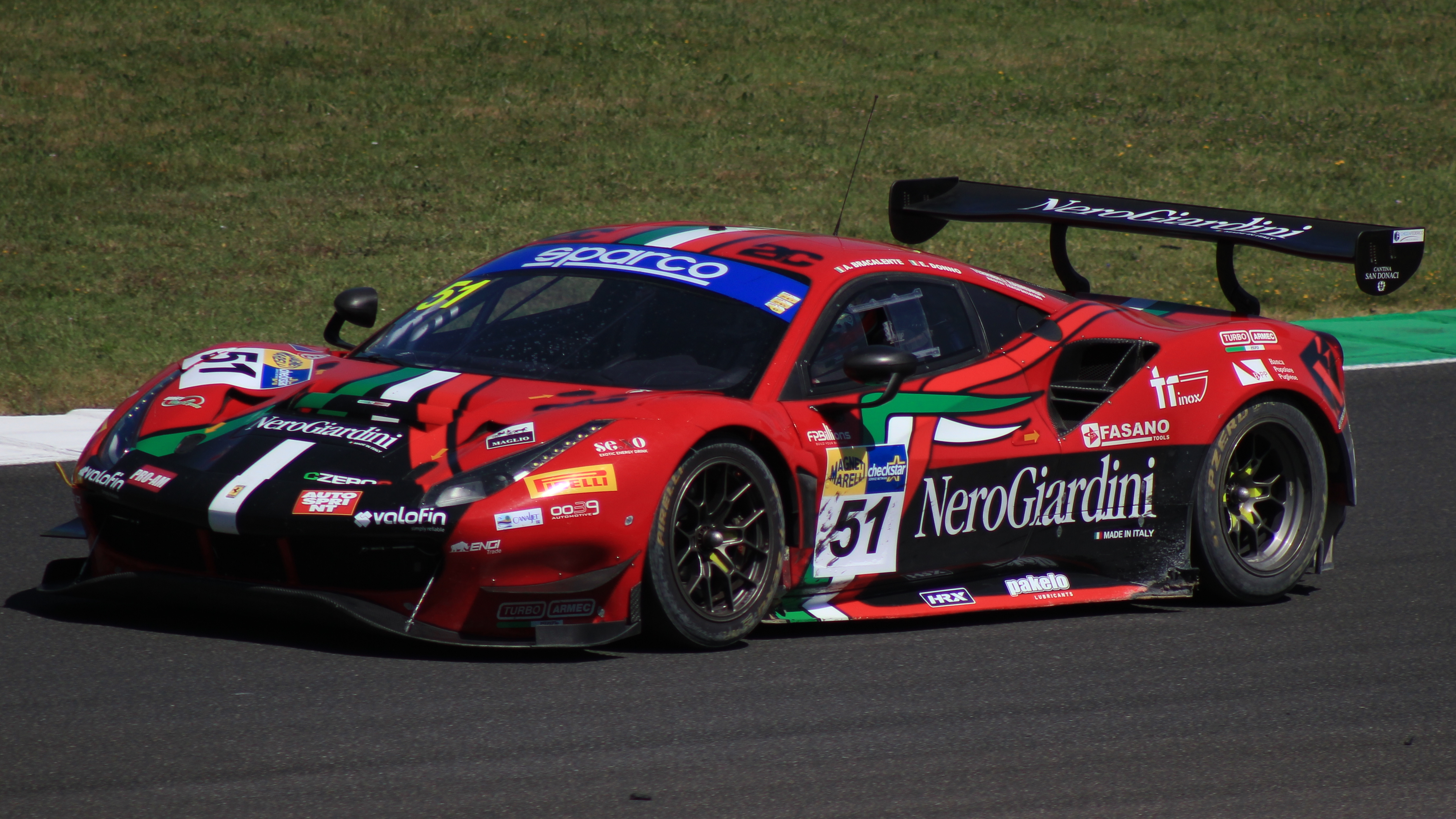
Donno at the Mugello round of the 2024 Italian GT Endurance Championship season

In early 2024 it was announced that Donno would pair up with Ferrari Challenge rival Tom Fleming at AF Corse for the 2024 GT World Challenge Europe Sprint Cup. In the opening round of the season at Brands Hatch, the pair finished third among the Silvers in race one. In race two, Donno earned his first class win by finishing 11th. In the following round at Misano, Fleming suffered a massive crash in free practice, which meant neither he nor Donno would race in that weekend. At the Hockenheimring, Donno took his maiden pole in the championship. In race one, Donno took his second class win of the season by finishing fourth, while in race two he finished 21st after being given a penalty for exceeding track limits. After scoring a third class win, at the penultimate round of the season, Donno ended the season fourth in the Silver category and 13th overall in the Drivers' standings.

In late May, AF Corse announced that Donno would compete in the 2024 Italian GT Endurance Championship alongside Alessandro Bracalente in the Pro-Am class. The pair scored a best finish of third at Vallelunga and finished fifth in the standings. Donno also made a one-off appearance in the International GT Open championship at the Hungaroring round, where he qualified on pole for race two and finished 12th in the race following a spin. At the end of the year, Donno made his debut at the Gulf 12 Hours, finishing fourth in his first trip to Abu Dhabi.

=== 2025 ===
Donno stayed with AF Corse for the 2025 season, racing in both the GT World Challenge Europe Endurance Cup and Le Mans Cup. In the former, Donno had a slow start to the season, before finishing fourth at the 24 Hours of Spa and ending the year with a fourth-place finish at Barcelona en route to a ninth-place points finish. In Le Mans Cup, Donno scored five second-place finishes, with one of them awarding the winner's points as they finished behind the non-championship entry of GetSpeed, as he secured the GT3 title at the finale in Algarve.

=== 2026 ===
The following year, Donno remained with AF Corse for his sophomore season in the GT3 class of the Le Mans Cup. In his title-defending season, Donno scored a lone podium at Le Castellet and finished sixth in points. In parallel, Donno also raced in the Italian GT Championship Endurance Cup for Lamborghini-fielding DL Racing, in which he took a lone podium at Monza to take fourth in points.

== Karting record ==
=== Karting career summary ===
Season	Series	Team	Position
2019	ROK Cup Superfinal - Junior ROK	Luca Donno	18th
2020	25° South Garda Winter Cup - OKJ	Luca Donno	NC
2020	ROK Cup International Final - Junior ROK	Luca Donno	23rd
2021	WSK Super Master Series - OK	KGT Motorsport	NC
2021	26° Trofeo Ayrton Senna - X30 Senior		3rd
2021	Italian ACI Karting Championship - Rok Senior		1st
2021	Italian ACI Karting Championship - X30 Senior		18th
2021	Italian ACI Karting Championship - OK		7th
2021	WSK Open Cup - OK	DPK Racing	38th
2022	Italian ACI Karting Championship - X30 Senior		14th

== Racing record ==
=== Racing career summary ===
Season	Series	Team	Races	Wins	Poles	F/Laps	Podiums	Points	Position
2022	Ferrari Challenge Europe - Trofeo Pirelli	Chiuini De Poi	8	2	1	2	3	56	4th
2022	Italian GT Endurance Championship - GT Cup Pro-Am	Best Lap	2	2	2	0	2	—N/a	NC†
2022	Italian GT Sprint Championship - GT Cup Pro-Am	Best Lap	2	1	0	0	1	—N/a	NC†
2022	Italian GT Sprint Championship - GT Cup Am	Best Lap	2	1	0	0	1	—N/a	NC†
2023	Ferrari Challenge Europe - Trofeo Pirelli	Radicci Automobili	13	5	7	7	10	172	**1st**
2023	Ferrari Challenge Finali Mondiali - Trofeo Pirelli	Radicci Automobili	1	0	0	0	1	—N/a	**2nd**
2023	Italian GT Endurance Championship - GT3 Pro-Am	AF Corse	4	0	0	0	3	42	5th
2024	GT World Challenge Europe Sprint Cup - Silver	AF Corse	8	3	2	2	4	80	4th
2024	Italian GT Endurance Championship - GT3 Pro-Am	AF Corse	4	0	2	0	1	61	5th
2024	International GT Open - Pro-Am	AF Corse	2	0	1	0	0	9	24th
2024	Gulf 12 Hours - GT3 Pro-Am	AF Corse	1	0	0	0	0	—N/a	4th
2025	Le Mans Cup - GT3	AF Corse	7	0	1	2	5	104	**1st**
2025	GT World Challenge Europe Endurance Cup	AF Corse - Francorchamps Motors	4	0	0	0	0	34	9th
2026	Le Mans Cup – GT3	AF Corse	6	0	0	2	1	62	6th
2026	Italian GT Championship Endurance Cup – GT3	DL Racing	4	0	0	0	1	44	5th

^{†} As Donno was a guest driver, he was ineligible to score points.
^{*} Season still in progress.

=== Complete GT World Challenge Europe results ===
==== GT World Challenge Europe Sprint Cup ====
(Races in bold indicate pole position) (Races in italics indicate fastest lap)

Year	Team	Car	Class	1	2	3	4	5	6	7	8	9	10	Pos.	Points
2024	AF Corse	Ferrari 296 GT3	Silver	BRH; 1; 10	**BRH**; **2**; 11	MIS; 1 WD	MIS; 2 WD	**HOC**; **1**; 4	HOC; 2; 21	MAG; 1; 17	MAG; 2; 8	CAT; 1; 14	CAT; 2; 24	4th	80

==== GT World Challenge Europe Endurance Cup ====
(Races in bold indicate pole position) (Races in italics indicate fastest lap)

Year	Team	Car	Class	1	2	3	4	5	6	7	Pos.	Points
2025	AF Corse - Francorchamps Motors	Ferrari 296 GT3	Pro	LEC; 16	MNZ; 43†	SPA; 6H; 5	SPA; 12H; 5	SPA; 24H; 4	NÜR; DNS	CAT; 4	9th	34

=== Complete International GT Open results ===
(key) (Races in bold indicate pole position; races in italics indicate points for the fastest lap of top ten finishers)

Year	Team	Car	Class	1	2	3	4	5	6	7	8	9	10	11	12	13	14	DC	Points
2024	AF Corse	Ferrari 296 GT3	Pro-Am	ALG; 1	ALG; 2	HOC; 1	HOC; 2	SPA	HUN; 1; 5	**HUN**; **2**; 4	LEC; 1	LEC; 2	RBR; 1	RBR; 2	CAT; 1	CAT; 2	MNZ	24th	9

=== Complete Le Mans Cup results ===
(key) (Races in bold indicate pole position) (Races in italics indicate the fastest lap)

Year	Entrant	Car	Class	1	2	3	4	5	6	7	DC	Points
2025	AF Corse	Ferrari 296 GT3	GT3	CAT; 6	LEC; 2	**LMS**; **1**; 2	LMS; 2; 6	SPA; 2	SIL; 2	ALG; 2	1st	104
2026	AF Corse	Ferrari 296 GT3 Evo	GT3	CAT; 5	LEC; 2	LMS; 7	SPA; Ret	SIL; 5	ALG; 4		6th	62

^{*} Season still in progress.

Sporting positions
Preceded by Doriane Pin	Ferrari Challenge Europe - Trofeo Pirelli; Champion; 2023	Succeeded by Giacomo Altoè
