= 2023 Italian GT Championship =

Italian Motorsports Championship

The 2023 Italian GT Championship was the 32nd season of the Italian GT Championship, the grand tourer-style sports car racing founded by the Italian Automobile Club (Automobile Club d'Italia). The season started on 5 May at Misano and ended on 29 October at Imola. The Sprint Cup championship was won by Jens Klingmann and Bruno Spengler, with the GT3 PRO-AM championship being won by Phillippe Denes and Dmitry Gvazava, GT3 AM was won by the duo of Massimo Ciglia and Guiseppe Fascicolo, Gilles Stadsbader won the GT Cup PRO-AM, and the GT Cup AM was won by Vincenzo Scarpetta.

== Calendar ==
Round	Circuit	Date	Type	Map
1	Misano World Circuit Marco Simoncelli Misano Adriatico, Emilia-Romagna	5–7 May	Sprint	2023 Italian GT Championship is located in Italy
2	Autodromo di Pergusa Pergusa, Sicily	19–21 May	Endurance	2023 Italian GT Championship is located in Italy
3	Autodromo Nazionale di Monza Monza, Lombardy	23–25 June	Sprint	2023 Italian GT Championship is located in Italy
4	Autodromo Internazionale del Mugello Mugello, Tuscany	7–9 July	Endurance	2023 Italian GT Championship is located in Italy
5	Autodromo Nazionale di Monza Monza, Lombardy	15–17 September	Endurance	2023 Italian GT Championship is located in Italy
6	Autodromo Internazionale del Mugello Mugello, Tuscany	29 September—1 October	Sprint	2023 Italian GT Championship is located in Italy
7	ACI Vallelunga Circuit Campagnano di Roma, Rome	13–15 October	Endurance	2023 Italian GT Championship is located in Italy
8	Autodromo Internazionale Enzo e Dino Ferrari Imola, Emilia-Romagna	27–29 October	Sprint	2023 Italian GT Championship is located in Italy

== Entry list ==
=== GT3 ===
Team	Car	No.	Drivers	Class	Rounds
(San Marino) Audi Sport Italia	Audi R8 LMS Evo II	1	(Italy) Luca Attianese	PA	2, 4–5, 7
(San Marino) Audi Sport Italia	Audi R8 LMS Evo II	1	(Thailand) Sandy Stuvik	PA	2, 4–5, 7
(San Marino) Audi Sport Italia	Audi R8 LMS Evo II	1	(Italy) Marco Butti	PA	2
(San Marino) Audi Sport Italia	Audi R8 LMS Evo II	1	(France) Antoine Bottiroli	PA	4, 7
(San Marino) Audi Sport Italia	Audi R8 LMS Evo II	1	(Italy) Marco Butti	P	3
(Italy) Easy Race	Ferrari 296 GT3	3	(Italy) Thomas Biagi	P	8
(Italy) Easy Race	Ferrari 296 GT3	3	(Italy) Riccardo Ponzio	P	8
(San Marino) AKM Motorsport	Mercedes-AMG GT3 Evo	6	(Denmark) Georg Kelstrup	PA	1, 3, 6, 8
(San Marino) AKM Motorsport	Mercedes-AMG GT3 Evo	6	(Italy) Gustavo Sandrucci	PA	1, 3, 6, 8
(San Marino) AKM Motorsport	Mercedes-AMG GT3 Evo	12	(Italy) Andrea Kimi Antonelli	P	1
(San Marino) AKM Motorsport	Mercedes-AMG GT3 Evo	12	(Finland) William Alatalo	P	3
(San Marino) AKM Motorsport	Mercedes-AMG GT3 Evo	12	(Italy) Lorenzo Ferrari	P	3
(San Marino) AKM Motorsport	Mercedes-AMG GT3 Evo	12	(Italy) Marco Antonelli	Am	6
(Italy) BMW Italia Ceccato Racing	BMW M4 GT3	7	(Germany) Jens Klingmann	P	1, 3, 6, 8
(Italy) BMW Italia Ceccato Racing	BMW M4 GT3	7	(Canada) Bruno Spengler	P	1, 3, 6, 8
(Italy) BMW Italia Ceccato Racing	BMW M4 GT3	7	(Italy) Marco Cassarà	PA	2, 4–5, 7
(Italy) BMW Italia Ceccato Racing	BMW M4 GT3	7	(Italy) Stefano Comandini	PA	2, 4–5, 7
(Italy) BMW Italia Ceccato Racing	BMW M4 GT3	7	(Sweden) Alfred Nilsson	PA	2, 4–5, 7
(Italy) BMW Italia Ceccato Racing	BMW M4 GT3	8	(Italy) Carlo Tamburini	PA	All
(Italy) BMW Italia Ceccato Racing	BMW M4 GT3	8	(Italy) Francesco De Luca	PA	1, 3, 6, 8
(Italy) BMW Italia Ceccato Racing	BMW M4 GT3	8	(Italy) Francesco Guerra	PA	2, 4–5, 7
(Italy) BMW Italia Ceccato Racing	BMW M4 GT3	8	(Italy) Salvatore Tavano	PA	2, 4–5, 7
(Italy) Oregon Team	Lamborghini Huracán GT3 Evo 2	9	(Italy) Alessio Deledda	P	8
(Italy) Oregon Team	Lamborghini Huracán GT3 Evo 2	9	(Italy) Leonardo Pulcini	P	8
(Italy) Imperiale Racing	Lamborghini Huracán GT3 Evo	16	(Italy) Massimo Ciglia	Am	1, 3, 6, 8
(Italy) Imperiale Racing	Lamborghini Huracán GT3 Evo	16	(Italy) Giuseppe Fascicolo	Am	1, 3, 6, 8
(Italy) Imperiale Racing	Lamborghini Huracán GT3 Evo	16	(United Kingdom) Jack Bartholomew	PA	2, 4–5, 7
(Italy) Imperiale Racing	Lamborghini Huracán GT3 Evo	16	(India) Mahaveer Raghunathan	PA	2, 4–5, 7
(Italy) Imperiale Racing	Lamborghini Huracán GT3 Evo	16	(Paraguay) Miguel María García	PA	2, 4–5
(Italy) Imperiale Racing	Lamborghini Huracán GT3 Evo	16	(Italy) Giuseppe Fascicolo	PA	7
(Italy) Imperiale Racing	Lamborghini Huracán GT3 Evo	54	(United States) Phillippe Denes	PA	1, 3, 6, 8
(Italy) Imperiale Racing	Lamborghini Huracán GT3 Evo	54	(Kyrgyzstan) Dmitry Gvazava (Note: Dmitry Gvazava is Russian, but in timing sheets competes under the flag of Kyrgyzstan as Belarusian and Russian national emblems were banned by the association due to the Russian invasion of Ukraine.)	PA	1, 3, 6, 8
(Italy) Imperiale Racing	Lamborghini Huracán GT3 Evo	54	(Italy) Kevin Gilardoni	P	2, 4–5, 7
(Italy) Imperiale Racing	Lamborghini Huracán GT3 Evo	54	(Mexico) Raúl Guzmán	P	2, 4–5, 7
(Italy) Imperiale Racing	Lamborghini Huracán GT3 Evo	54	(United Kingdom) Stuart Middleton	P	2, 4–5, 7
(Italy) Vincenzo Sospiri Racing	Lamborghini Huracán GT3 Evo 2	19	(Guatemala) Mateo Llarena	P	1, 3, 6, 8
(Italy) Vincenzo Sospiri Racing	Lamborghini Huracán GT3 Evo 2	19	(Belgium) Baptiste Moulin	P	1, 3, 6, 8
(Italy) Vincenzo Sospiri Racing	Lamborghini Huracán GT3 Evo 2	60	(Italy) Riccardo Cazzaniga	P	1, 3, 6, 8
(Italy) Vincenzo Sospiri Racing	Lamborghini Huracán GT3 Evo 2	60	(Israel) Artem Petrov (Note: Artem Petrov is Russian, but in timing sheets competes under the flag of Israel as Belarusian and Russian national emblems were banned by the association due to the Russian invasion of Ukraine.)	P	1, 3, 6, 8
(Italy) Vincenzo Sospiri Racing	Lamborghini Huracán GT3 Evo 2	63	(Italy) Edoardo Liberati	P	1, 3, 6, 8
(Italy) Vincenzo Sospiri Racing	Lamborghini Huracán GT3 Evo 2	63	(Italy) Mattia Michelotto	P	1, 3, 6, 8
(Italy) Iron Lynx	Lamborghini Huracán GT3 Evo 2	20	(Italy) Matteo Cressoni	Am	7–8
(Italy) Iron Lynx	Lamborghini Huracán GT3 Evo 2	20	(Italy) Claudio Schiavoni	Am	7–8
(Italy) AF Corse	Ferrari 488 GT3 Evo 2020	21	(United States) Ray Acosta	Am	6
(Italy) AF Corse	Ferrari 488 GT3 Evo 2020	21	(Brazil) Oswaldo Negri Jr.	Am	6
(Italy) AF Corse	Ferrari 488 GT3 Evo 2020	51	(Belgium) Jules Castro	P	1, 3, 6–7
(Italy) AF Corse	Ferrari 488 GT3 Evo 2020	51	(Finland) Luka Nurmi	P	1, 3, 6
(Italy) AF Corse	Ferrari 488 GT3 Evo 2020	51	(Italy) Eliseo Donno	P	7
(Italy) AF Corse	Ferrari 488 GT3 Evo 2020	51	(Italy) Stefano Gai	P	7
(Italy) AF Corse	Ferrari 488 GT3 Evo 2020	51	(Belgium) Jules Castro	PA	2, 4–5, 8
(Italy) AF Corse	Ferrari 488 GT3 Evo 2020	51	(Italy) Stefano Gai	PA	2, 4–5
(Italy) AF Corse	Ferrari 488 GT3 Evo 2020	51	(Italy) Eliseo Donno	PA	2, 4
(Italy) AF Corse	Ferrari 488 GT3 Evo 2020	51	(Italy) Marco Pulcini	PA	5
(Italy) AF Corse	Ferrari 488 GT3 Evo 2020	51	(Finland) Luka Nurmi	PA	8
(Italy) AF Corse	Ferrari 488 GT3 Evo 2020	52	(Switzerland) Jean-Luc D'Auria	P	1, 3, 6, 8
(Italy) AF Corse	Ferrari 488 GT3 Evo 2020	52	(South Africa) Stuart White	P	1, 3, 6, 8
(Italy) AF Corse	Ferrari 488 GT3 Evo 2020	72	(Italy) Marco Pulcini	P	3
(Italy) AF Corse	Ferrari 488 GT3 Evo 2020	88	(Italy) Riccardo Agostini	PA	6
(Italy) AF Corse	Ferrari 488 GT3 Evo 2020	88	(Brazil) Custodio Toledo	PA	6
(Italy) Best Lap	Ferrari 488 GT3 Evo 2020	23	(Italy) Luigi Coluccio	PA	1, 3, 6, 8
(Italy) Best Lap	Ferrari 488 GT3 Evo 2020	23	(Italy) Rocco Mazzola	PA	1, 3, 6, 8
(Italy) Scuderia Baldini 27	Ferrari 488 GT3 Evo 2020	27	(Italy) Giancarlo Fisichella	P	2, 4–5, 7
(Italy) Scuderia Baldini 27	Ferrari 488 GT3 Evo 2020	27	(Italy) Tommaso Mosca	P	2, 4–5, 7
(Italy) Nova Race	Mercedes-AMG GT3 Evo	28	(Italy) Fulvio Ferri	Am	5, 7
(Italy) Nova Race	Mercedes-AMG GT3 Evo	28	(Italy) Alberto Fontana	Am	5
(Italy) Nova Race	Mercedes-AMG GT3 Evo	28	(Italy) Alessandro Marchetti	Am	5
(Italy) Nova Race	Mercedes-AMG GT3 Evo	28	(Italy) Filippo Bencivenni	Am	7
(Italy) Nova Race	Mercedes-AMG GT3 Evo	28	(Italy) Luca Magnoni	Am	7
(Italy) Nova Race	Honda NSX GT3 Evo22	55	(Switzerland) Axel Gnos	PA	1, 3, 6, 8
(Italy) Nova Race	Honda NSX GT3 Evo22	55	(Italy) Matteo Greco	PA	1, 3, 6, 8
(Italy) Nova Race	Honda NSX GT3 Evo22	77	(Italy) Andrea Bodellini	Am	1, 3, 6, 8
(Italy) Nova Race	Honda NSX GT3 Evo22	77	(Italy) Luca Magnoni	Am	1, 3, 6, 8
Entry Lists:

Icon	Class
P	Pro Cup
PA	Pro-Am Cup
Am	Am Cup

=== GT Cup ===
Team	Car	No.	Drivers	Class	Rounds
(Italy) Giacomo Race	Lamborghini Huracán Super Trofeo Evo	106	(Italy) Giacomo Pollini	PA	1, 3, 6, 8
(Italy) Giacomo Race	Lamborghini Huracán Super Trofeo Evo	106	(Italy) Matteo Pollini	PA	1, 3, 6, 8
(Italy) Best Lap	Ferrari 488 Challenge Evo	111	(Italy) Luca Demarchi	PA	1–7
(Italy) Best Lap	Ferrari 488 Challenge Evo	111	(Italy) Simone Patrinicola	PA	1–7
(Italy) Best Lap	Ferrari 488 Challenge Evo	111	(Italy) Sabatino Di Mare	PA	2, 4–5, 7
(Italy) Best Lap	Ferrari 488 Challenge Evo	212	(Italy) Giammarco Marzialetti	Am	1, 3, 5–6
(Italy) Best Lap	Ferrari 488 Challenge Evo	212	(Italy) Nicola D'Aniello	Am	1, 3, 6
(Italy) Best Lap	Ferrari 488 Challenge Evo	212	(Italy) Vito Postiglione	Am	5
(Italy) Best Lap	Ferrari 488 Challenge Evo	212	(Italy) Vincenzo Scarpetta	Am	5
(Italy) Best Lap	Ferrari 488 Challenge Evo	290	(Italy) Lorenzo Nicoli	Am	1, 3, 6
(Italy) Best Lap	Ferrari 488 Challenge Evo	290	(Italy) Vincenzo Scarpetta	Am	1, 3, 6
(Italy) Ombra Racing	Porsche 992 GT3 Cup	112	(Italy) Mattia Orlando Di Gusto	PA	1, 3, 6, 8
(Italy) Ombra Racing	Porsche 992 GT3 Cup	112	(Italy) Riccardo Pera	PA	1, 3
(Italy) Ombra Racing	Porsche 992 GT3 Cup	112	(Venezuela) Jonathan Cecotto	PA	6, 8
(Italy) Pellin Racing	Ferrari 488 Challenge Evo	122	(United States) Matthew Kurzejewski	PA	6
(Italy) Pellin Racing	Ferrari 488 Challenge Evo	225	(Canada) Thor Haugen	Am	6
(Italy) Pellin Racing	Ferrari 488 Challenge Evo	227	(United States) Lisa Clark	Am	6
(Italy) Enrico Fulgenzi Racing	Porsche 992 GT3 Cup	125	(Italy) Kikko Galbiati	PA	4–5, 7
(Italy) Enrico Fulgenzi Racing	Porsche 992 GT3 Cup	125	(Italy) Vicky Piria	PA	4–5, 7
(Italy) Bonaldi Motorsport	Lamborghini Huracán Super Trofeo Evo2	151	(Germany) Michael Fischbaum	PA	2, 4, 7
(Italy) Bonaldi Motorsport	Lamborghini Huracán Super Trofeo Evo2	151	(Serbia) Miloš Pavlović	PA	2, 4, 7
(Italy) Bonaldi Motorsport	Lamborghini Huracán Super Trofeo Evo2	232	(Italy) Filippo Lazzaroni	Am	2, 4–5
(Italy) Bonaldi Motorsport	Lamborghini Huracán Super Trofeo Evo2	232	(Colombia) Andrés Méndez	Am	2, 5
(Italy) Bonaldi Motorsport	Lamborghini Huracán Super Trofeo Evo2	232	(Italy) Marzio Moretti	Am	4
(Italy) SR&R	Ferrari 488 Challenge Evo	152	(Italy) Alessio Bacci	Am	1
(Italy) SR&R	Ferrari 488 Challenge Evo	152	(Italy) Giaccomo Parisotto	Am	1
(Italy) SR&R	Ferrari 488 Challenge Evo	251	(Italy) Manuel Menichini	Am	1–2, 4–5, 7
(Italy) SR&R	Ferrari 488 Challenge Evo	251	(Italy) Lorenzo Bontempelli	Am	1, 3
(Italy) SR&R	Ferrari 488 Challenge Evo	251	(Italy) Francesco Atzori	Am	2, 4–5, 7
(Italy) SR&R	Ferrari 488 Challenge Evo	251	(Italy) Francesco La Mazza	Am	2
(Italy) SR&R	Ferrari 488 Challenge Evo	251	(Italy) Alessio Bacci	Am	3–4
(Italy) SR&R	Ferrari 488 Challenge Evo	251	(Italy) Enrico Di Leo	Am	5
(Italy) SR&R	Ferrari 488 Challenge Evo	252	(Italy) Gianluca Carboni	Am	3
(Italy) SR&R	Ferrari 488 Challenge Evo	252	(Italy) Emanuele Roamni	Am	3
(Italy) SR&R	Ferrari 488 Challenge Evo	252	(Italy) Enrico Di Leo	Am	4
(Italy) SR&R	Ferrari 488 Challenge Evo	252	(Italy) Francesco La Mazza	Am	4
(Italy) SR&R	Ferrari 488 Challenge Evo	252	(China) Kang Ling	Am	4
(Denmark) Formula Racing	Ferrari 488 Challenge Evo	161	(United States) John Dhillon	PA	6
(Denmark) Formula Racing	Ferrari 488 Challenge Evo	161	(Republic of Ireland) Matt Griffin	PA	6
(Denmark) Formula Racing	Ferrari 488 Challenge Evo	169	(Italy) Stefano Gai	PA	3, 6
(Denmark) Formula Racing	Ferrari 488 Challenge Evo	169	(Italy) Claudio Fontana	PA	3
(Denmark) Formula Racing	Ferrari 488 Challenge Evo	169	(Italy) Fabrizio Fontana	PA	6
(Denmark) Formula Racing	Ferrari 488 Challenge Evo	293	(Denmark) Andreas Bogh Sørensen	Am	6
(Italy) Vincenzo Sospiri Racing	Lamborghini Huracán Super Trofeo Evo	163	(Belgium) Gilles Stadsbader	PA	1, 8
(Italy) Vincenzo Sospiri Racing	Lamborghini Huracán Super Trofeo Evo	163	(Italy) Piergiacomo Randazzo	PA	8
(Italy) Vincenzo Sospiri Racing	Lamborghini Huracán Super Trofeo Evo	166	(Italy) Piergiacomo Randazzo	PA	6
(Italy) Vincenzo Sospiri Racing	Lamborghini Huracán Super Trofeo Evo	166	(Belgium) Gilles Stadsbader	PA	6
(Italy) Vincenzo Sospiri Racing	Lamborghini Huracán Super Trofeo Evo	206	(Italy) Ignazio Zanon	Am	1, 3, 6, 8
(Italy) Petri Corse	Lamborghini Huracán Super Trofeo Evo	163	(Italy) Leonardo Becagli	PA	4
(Italy) Petri Corse	Lamborghini Huracán Super Trofeo Evo	163	(Italy) Jacopo Guidetti	PA	4
(Italy) Petri Corse	Lamborghini Huracán Super Trofeo Evo	163	(Italy) Maurizio Fondi	PA	4
(Italy) Giagua	Lamborghini Huracán Super Trofeo Evo	163	(Italy) "Giagua"	PA	5
(Italy) Giagua	Lamborghini Huracán Super Trofeo Evo	163	(Italy) Alessandro Tarabini	PA	5
(Italy) Lamborghini Roma DL Racing	Lamborghini Huracán Super Trofeo Evo	172	(Italy) Luca Segù	PA	1, 3, 6, 8
(Italy) Lamborghini Roma DL Racing	Lamborghini Huracán Super Trofeo Evo	172	(Sweden) Daniel Vebster	PA	1, 3, 6, 8
(Italy) Lamborghini Roma DL Racing	Lamborghini Huracán Super Trofeo Evo	223	(Italy) Marco Cassarà	Am	8
(Italy) Lamborghini Roma DL Racing	Lamborghini Huracán Super Trofeo Evo	223	(Italy) Diego Locanto	Am	8
(Italy) Lamborghini Roma DL Racing	Lamborghini Huracán Super Trofeo Evo	248	(Italy) Pierluigi Alessandri	PA	1, 6, 8
(Italy) Lamborghini Roma DL Racing	Lamborghini Huracán Super Trofeo Evo	272	(Italy) Alessandro Fabi	PA	1
(Italy) Lamborghini Roma DL Racing	Lamborghini Huracán Super Trofeo Evo	272	(Italy) Giacomo Riva	PA	1
(Italy) Lamborghini Roma DL Racing	Lamborghini Huracán Super Trofeo Evo	272	(Italy) Alessandro Fabi	Am	2–8
(Italy) Lamborghini Roma DL Racing	Lamborghini Huracán Super Trofeo Evo	272	(Italy) Alessio Caiola	Am	2, 4–5, 7
(Italy) Lamborghini Roma DL Racing	Lamborghini Huracán Super Trofeo Evo	272	(Italy) Riccardo Ianiello	Am	2, 4–5, 7
(Italy) Lamborghini Roma DL Racing	Lamborghini Huracán Super Trofeo Evo	272	(Italy) Giacomo Riva	Am	3, 6, 8
(Italy) Lamborghini Roma DL Racing	Lamborghini Huracán Super Trofeo Evo	273	(Italy) Lorenzo Bontempelli	Am	2, 4–5
(Italy) Lamborghini Roma DL Racing	Lamborghini Huracán Super Trofeo Evo	273	(Greece) Dimitros Deverikos	Am	2, 4–5
(Italy) Lamborghini Roma DL Racing	Lamborghini Huracán Super Trofeo Evo	273	(Italy) "Linos"	Am	2, 4
(Italy) Lamborghini Roma DL Racing	Lamborghini Huracán Super Trofeo Evo	273	(Italy) Diego Locanto	Am	5, 7
(Italy) Lamborghini Roma DL Racing	Lamborghini Huracán Super Trofeo Evo	273	(Egypt) Ibrahim Badawy	Am	7
(Italy) Lamborghini Roma DL Racing	Lamborghini Huracán Super Trofeo Evo	273	(Italy) Matteo Marulla	Am	7
(Italy) Eugenio Pisani	Porsche 991 GT3 II Cup	176	(Italy) Eugenio Pisani	PA	1
(Italy) Eugenio Pisani	Porsche 991 GT3 II Cup	176	(Italy) Stefano Zerbi	PA	1
(Italy) Racevent	Porsche 992 GT3 Cup	177	(Italy) Pablo Biolghini	PA	1, 3
(Italy) Racevent	Porsche 992 GT3 Cup	177	(Italy) Vito Postiglione	PA	1, 3
(Italy) Easy Race	Ferrari 488 Challenge Evo	196	(Italy) Thomas Biagi	PA	6
(Italy) Easy Race	Ferrari 488 Challenge Evo	196	(Italy) Leonardo Del Col	PA	6
(Italy) Easy Race	Ferrari 488 Challenge Evo	269	(Italy) Thomas Biagi	Am	5, 7
(Italy) Easy Race	Ferrari 488 Challenge Evo	269	(Italy) Francesco La Mazza	Am	5, 7
(Italy) Easy Race	Ferrari 488 Challenge Evo	269	(Italy) Luciano Linossi	Am	7
(Italy) Easy Race	Ferrari 488 Challenge Evo	296	(Italy) Leonardo Del Col	Am	1, 3, 8
(Italy) Easy Race	Ferrari 488 Challenge Evo	296	(Italy) Elia Galvanin	Am	1, 3
(Italy) Easy Race	Ferrari 488 Challenge Evo	296	(Italy) Emiliano Pierantoni	Am	8
(Italy) DoulbeTT Racing	Ferrari 488 Challenge Evo	199	(Italy) Leonardo Colavita	PA	1, 3, 6, 8
(Italy) DoulbeTT Racing	Ferrari 488 Challenge Evo	199	(Italy) Michele Rugolo	PA	1
(Italy) DoulbeTT Racing	Ferrari 488 Challenge Evo	199	(Switzerland) Giorgio Maggi	PA	3, 6, 8
(Italy) HC Racing	Lamborghini Huracán Super Trofeo Evo	202	(Italy) Ferdinando D'Auria	Am	1, 3, 6, 8
(Italy) HC Racing	Lamborghini Huracán Super Trofeo Evo	202	(Italy) Gaetano Oliva	Am	1, 3, 8
(Italy) HC Racing	Lamborghini Huracán Super Trofeo Evo	202	(Italy) Benedetto Strignano	Am	6
(Italy) HC Racing	Lamborghini Huracán Super Trofeo Evo	230	(Italy) Massimiliano Pezzuto	Am	1, 3, 6
(Italy) HC Racing	Lamborghini Huracán Super Trofeo Evo	230	(Italy) Nicolò Pezzuto	Am	1, 3, 6
(Italy) Ebimotors	Porsche 991 GT3 II Cup	203	(Italy) Cosmi Papi	Am	1, 3, 6, 8
(Italy) Ebimotors	Porsche 991 GT3 II Cup	203	(Italy) Valerio Prandi	Am	1, 3
(Italy) Ebimotors	Porsche 991 GT3 II Cup	203	(Italy) Costantino Peroni	Am	6, 8
(Italy) Ebimotors	Porsche 991 GT3 II Cup	229	(Italy) Christian Gross	Am	3
(Italy) Ebimotors	Porsche 991 GT3 II Cup	244	(Italy) Alessandro Baccani	Am	1, 3
(Italy) Ebimotors	Porsche 991 GT3 II Cup	244	(Italy) Paolo Venerosi Pesciolini	Am	1, 3
(Italy) Ebimotors	Porsche 991 GT3 II Cup	271	(Italy) Niccolò Liana	Am	1, 3, 6, 8
(Italy) Ebimotors	Porsche 991 GT3 II Cup	271	(Italy) Gianluigi Piccioli	Am	1, 6
(Italy) Ebimotors	Porsche 991 GT3 II Cup	271	(Italy) Ronnie Valori	Am	3, 8
(Italy) Nova Race Events	Mercedes-AMG GT4	207	(Italy) Alessandro Marchetti	Am	1, 3
(Italy) Nova Race Events	Mercedes-AMG GT4	207	(Italy) Gianluca Carboni	Am	1
(Italy) Nova Race Events	Mercedes-AMG GT4	207	(Italy) Erwin Zanotti	Am	3
(Italy) Nova Race Events	Mercedes-AMG GT4	228	(Italy) Filippo Bencivenni	Am	1, 3
(Italy) Nova Race Events	Mercedes-AMG GT4	228	(Italy) Fulvio Ferri	Am	1, 3
(Italy) Iron Lynx	Lamborghini Huracán Super Trofeo Evo2	208	(San Marino) Luciano Privitelio	Am	1, 4, 6–8
(Italy) Iron Lynx	Lamborghini Huracán Super Trofeo Evo2	208	(San Marino) Donovan Privitelio	Am	1, 4, 6–7
(Italy) Iron Lynx	Lamborghini Huracán Super Trofeo Evo2	209	(Italy) Bruno Malerba	Am	8
(Italy) Iron Lynx	Lamborghini Huracán Super Trofeo Evo2	209	(Italy) Fabio Malerba	Am	8
(Italy) Autorlando Sport	Porsche 992 GT3 Cup	211	(Italy) Giuseppe Ghezzi	Am	1, 3, 6
(Italy) Autorlando Sport	Porsche 992 GT3 Cup	211	(Italy) Mirko Zanardini	Am	1, 3, 6
(Italy) Krypton Motorsport	Porsche 992 GT3 Cup	222	(Italy) Stefano Pezzucchi	Am	1–4, 6–8
(Italy) Krypton Motorsport	Porsche 992 GT3 Cup	222	(Italy) Luca Pastorelli	Am	1, 3, 6, 8
(Italy) Krypton Motorsport	Porsche 992 GT3 Cup	222	(Italy) Davide Di Benedetto	Am	2, 4–5, 7
(Italy) Krypton Motorsport	Porsche 992 GT3 Cup	222	(Italy) Giuseppe Nicolosi	Am	2, 4–5, 7
(Italy) SP Racing	Porsche 992 GT3 Cup	233	(Italy) Massimo Abbati	Am	1, 3, 6, 8
(Italy) SP Racing	Porsche 992 GT3 Cup	233	(Italy) Alberto Grisi	Am	1, 3, 6, 8
(San Marino) GDL Racing	Porsche 992 GT3 Cup	234	(Italy) Matteo Luvisi	Am	1, 3–4, 6
(San Marino) GDL Racing	Porsche 992 GT3 Cup	234	(Italy) Filippo Croccolino	Am	1, 3, 6
(San Marino) GDL Racing	Porsche 992 GT3 Cup	234	(Italy) Gianni Di Fant	Am	4
(San Marino) GDL Racing	Porsche 992 GT3 Cup	234	(Italy) Marco Guerra	Am	4
(Italy) CRM Motorsport	Lamborghini Huracán Super Trofeo Evo	247	(Italy) Ettore Carminati	Am	1, 3, 6, 8
(Italy) Mauro Simoncini	Porsche 991 GT3 II Cup	255	(Switzerland) Roberto Barin	Am	5
(Italy) Mauro Simoncini	Porsche 991 GT3 II Cup	255	(Italy) Alfredo Franceschi	Am	5
(Italy) Mauro Simoncini	Porsche 991 GT3 II Cup	255	(Italy) Mauro Simoncini	Am	5
(Italy) Rossocorsa	Ferrari 488 Challenge Evo	270	(Italy) Samuele Buttarelli	Am	6
(Italy) Rossocorsa	Ferrari 488 Challenge Evo	270	(Italy) Stefano Marazzi	Am	6
(Switzerland) Centro Porsche Ticino	Porsche 992 GT3 Cup	275	(Switzerland) Nicolas Leutwiler	Am	5, 7
(Switzerland) Centro Porsche Ticino	Porsche 992 GT3 Cup	275	(Germany) Nico Menzel	Am	5, 7
(Switzerland) Centro Porsche Ticino	Porsche 992 GT3 Cup	275	(Italy) Stefano Costantini	Am	5
(Switzerland) Centro Porsche Ticino	Porsche 992 GT3 Cup	275	(Switzerland) Ivan Jacoma	Am	7
(Germany) Mertel Motorsport	Ferrari 488 Challenge Evo	288	(Italy) Maurizio Ceresoli	Am	5
(Germany) Mertel Motorsport	Ferrari 488 Challenge Evo	288	(Germany) Matthias Tomann	Am	5
(Italy) AF Corse	Ferrari 488 Challenge Evo	290	(Italy) Vincenzo Scarpetta	Am	8
(Italy) PS Performance	Porsche 992 GT3 Cup	291	(Italy) Francesco Barin	Am	4
(Italy) PS Performance	Porsche 992 GT3 Cup	291	(Italy) Alfredo Franceschi	Am	4
(Italy) PS Performance	Porsche 992 GT3 Cup	291	(Italy) Mauro Simoncini	Am	4
Entry Lists:

Icon	Class
PA	Pro-Am Cup
Am	Am Cup

== Race calendar and results ==
Bold indicates the overall and GT Cup winners.

Round		Circuit	Date	Pole position	GT3 Pro Winners	GT3 Pro-Am Winners	GT3 Am Winners	GT Cup Pro-Am Winners	GT Cup Am Winners
1	R1	(Italy) Misano World Circuit Marco Simoncelli	6 May	(San Marino) No. 12 AKM Motorsport	**(San Marino) No. 12 AKM Motorsport**	(Italy) No. 51 AF Corse	(Italy) No. 16 Imperiale Racing	**(Italy) No. 163 Vincenzo Sospiri Racing**	(Italy) No. 222 Krypton Motorsport
1	R1	(Italy) Misano World Circuit Marco Simoncelli	6 May	(Italy) Andrea Kimi Antonelli	**(Italy) Andrea Kimi Antonelli**	(Finland) Luka Nurmi (Belgium) Jules Castro	(Italy) Giuseppe Fascicolo (Italy) Massimo Ciglia	**(Belgium) Gilles Stadsbader**	(Italy) Luca Pastorelli (Italy) Stefano A. Pezzucchi
1	R2	(Italy) Misano World Circuit Marco Simoncelli	7 May	(Italy) No. 52 AF Corse	**(Italy) No. 52 AF Corse**	(San Marino) No. 6 AKM Motorsport	(Italy) No. 16 Imperiale Racing	**(Italy) No. 163 Vincenzo Sospiri Racing**	(Italy) No. 206 Vincenzo Sospiri Racing
1	R2	(Italy) Misano World Circuit Marco Simoncelli	7 May	(South Africa) Stuart White (Switzerland) Jean-Luc D'Auria	**(South Africa) Stuart White** **(Switzerland) Jean-Luc D'Auria**	(Italy) Gustavo Sandrucci (Denmark) Georg Kelstrup	(Italy) Giuseppe Fascicolo (Italy) Massimo Ciglia	**(Belgium) Gilles Stadsbader**	(United Kingdom) Ignazio Zanon
2		(Italy) Autodromo di Pergusa	21 May	(Italy) No. 54 Imperiale Racing	**(Italy) No. 27 Scuderia Baldini 27**	(Italy) No. 7 BMW Italia Ceccato Racing	No entries	**(Italy) No. 111 Best Lap**	(Italy) No. 251 SR&R
2		(Italy) Autodromo di Pergusa	21 May	(Italy) Kevin Gilardoni (Mexico) Raúl Guzmán (United Kingdom) Stuart Middleton	**(Italy) Giancarlo Fisichella** **(Italy) Tommaso Mosca**	(Italy) Marco Cassarà (Italy) Stefano Comandini (Sweden) Alfred Nilsson	No entries	**(Italy) Luca Demarchi** **(Italy) Simone Patrinicola** **(Italy) Sabatino Di Mare**	(Italy) Manuel Menichini (Italy) Francesco Atzori (Italy) Francesco La Mazza
3	R1	(Italy) Autodromo Nazionale di Monza	24 June	(Italy) No. 52 AF Corse	**(Italy) No. 7 BMW Italia Ceccato Racing**	(Italy) No. 8 BMW Italia Ceccato Racing	(Italy) No. 16 Imperiale Racing	**(Italy) No. 199 DoulbeTT Racing**	(Italy) No. 272 Lamborghini Roma DL Racing
3	R1	(Italy) Autodromo Nazionale di Monza	24 June	(Switzerland) Jean-Luc D'Auria (South Africa) Stuart White	**(Germany) Jens Klingmann** **(Canada) Bruno Spengler**	(Italy) Carlo Tamburini (Italy) Francesco De Luca	(Italy) Massimo Ciglia (Italy) Giuseppe Fascicolo	**(Italy) Leonardo Colavita** **(Switzerland) Giorgio Maggi**	(Italy) Alessandro Fabi (Italy) Giacomo Riva
3	R2	(Italy) Autodromo Nazionale di Monza	25 June	(Italy) No. 60 Vincenzo Sospiri Racing	**(Italy) No. 60 Vincenzo Sospiri Racing**	(Italy) No. 54 Imperiale Racing	(Italy) No. 16 Imperiale Racing	**(Italy) No. 196 Easy Race**	(Italy) No. 247 CRM Motorsport
3	R2	(Italy) Autodromo Nazionale di Monza	25 June	(Italy) Riccardo Cazzaniga (Israel) Artem Petrov	**(Italy) Riccardo Cazzaniga** **(Israel) Artem Petrov**	(United States) Phillippe Denes (Kyrgyzstan) Dmitry Gvazava	(Italy) Massimo Ciglia (Italy) Giuseppe Fascicolo	**(Italy) Thomas Biagi** **(Italy) Leonardo Del Col**	(Italy) Ettore Carminati
4		(Italy) Autodromo Internazionale del Mugello	9 July	(Italy) No. 27 Scuderia Baldini 27	**(Italy) No. 27 Scuderia Baldini 27**	(Italy) No. 8 BMW Italia Ceccato Racing	No entries	**(Italy) No. 125 Enrico Fulgenzi Racing**	(Italy) No. 232 Bonaldi Motorsport
4		(Italy) Autodromo Internazionale del Mugello	9 July	(Italy) Giancarlo Fisichella (Italy) Tommaso Mosca	**(Italy) Giancarlo Fisichella** **(Italy) Tommaso Mosca**	(Italy) Carlo Tamburini (Italy) Francesco Guerra (Italy) Salvatore Tavano	No entries	**(Italy) Kikko Galbiati** **(Italy) Vicky Piria**	(Italy) Filippo Lazzaroni (Italy) Marzio Moretti
5		(Italy) Autodromo Nazionale di Monza	17 September	(Italy) No. 27 Scuderia Baldini 27	(Italy) No. 27 Scuderia Baldini 27	**(Italy) No. 8 BMW Italia Ceccato Racing**	(Italy) No. 28 Nova Race	(Italy) No. 111 Best Lap	**(Italy) No. 272 Lamborghini Roma DL Racing**
5		(Italy) Autodromo Nazionale di Monza	17 September	(Italy) Giancarlo Fisichella (Italy) Tommaso Mosca	(Italy) Giancarlo Fisichella (Italy) Tommaso Mosca	**(Italy) Carlo Tamburini** **(Italy) Francesco Guerra** **(Italy) Salvatore Tavano**	(Italy) Fulvio Ferri (Italy) Alberto Fontana (Italy) Alessandro Marchetti	(Italy) Luca Demarchi (Italy) Simone Patrinicola (Italy) Sabatino Di Mare	**(Italy) Alessandro Fabi** **(Italy) Giacomo Riva**
6	R1	(Italy) Autodromo Internazionale del Mugello	30 September	(Italy) No. 63 Vincenzo Sospiri Racing	**(Italy) No. 7 BMW Italia Ceccato Racing**	(Italy) No. 8 BMW Italia Ceccato Racing	(San Marino) No. 12 AKM Motorsport	**(Italy) No. 122 Pellin Racing**	(Italy) No. 270 Rossocorsa
6	R1	(Italy) Autodromo Internazionale del Mugello	30 September	(Italy) Edoardo Liberati (Italy) Mattia Michelotto	**(Germany) Jens Klingmann** **(Canada) Bruno Spengler**	(Italy) Carlo Tamburini (Italy) Francesco De Luca	(San Marino) Marco Antonelli	**(United States) Matthew Kurzejewski** **(Italy) Alessandro Balzan**	(Italy) Samuele Buttarelli (Italy) Stefano Marazzi
6	R2	(Italy) Autodromo Internazionale del Mugello	1 October	(Italy) No. 88 AF Corse	**(Italy) No. 63 Vincenzo Sospiri Racing**	(Italy) No. 51 AF Corse	(Italy) No. 77 Nova Race	**(Italy) No. 172 Lamborghini Roma DL Racing**	(Italy) No. 290 Best Lap
6	R2	(Italy) Autodromo Internazionale del Mugello	1 October	(Italy) Riccardo Agostini (Brazil) Custodio Toledo	**(Italy) Edoardo Liberati** **(Italy) Mattia Michelotto**	(Finland) Luka Nurmi (Belgium) Jules Castro	(Italy) Andrea Bodellini (Italy) Luca Magnoni	**(Italy) Luca Segù** **(Sweden) Daniel Vebster**	(Italy) Vincenzo Scarpetta
7		(Italy) ACI Vallelunga Circuit	15 October	(Italy) No. 27 Scuderia Baldini 27	**(Italy) No. 54 Imperiale Racing**	(Italy) No. 8 BMW Italia Ceccato Racing	(Italy) No. 20 Iron Lynx	(Italy) No. 125 Enrico Fulgenzi Racing	(Switzerland) No. 275 Centro Porsche Ticino
7		(Italy) ACI Vallelunga Circuit	15 October	(Italy) Giancarlo Fisichella (Italy) Tommaso Mosca	**(Italy) Kevin Gilardoni** **(Mexico) Raúl Guzmán** **(United Kingdom) Stuart Middleton**	(Italy) Carlo Tamburini (Italy) Francesco Guerra (Italy) Salvatore Tavano	(Italy) Matteo Cressoni (Italy) Claudio Schiavoni	**(Italy) Kikko Galbiati** **(Italy) Vicky Piria**	(Switzerland) Nicolas Leutwiler (Germany) Nico Menzel (Switzerland) Ivan Jacoma
8	R1	(Italy) Autodromo Internazionale Enzo e Dino Ferrari	28 October	(Italy) No. 63 Vincenzo Sospiri Racing	**(Italy) No. 19 Vincenzo Sospiri Racing**	(Italy) No. 54 Imperiale Racing	(Italy) No. 16 Imperiale Racing	**(Italy) No. 163 Vincenzo Sospiri Racing**	(Denmark) No. 290 Formula Racing
8	R1	(Italy) Autodromo Internazionale Enzo e Dino Ferrari	28 October	(Italy) Edoardo Liberati (Italy) Mattia Michelotto	**(Guatemala) Mateo Llarena** **(Belgium) Baptiste Moulin**	(United States) Phillippe Denes (Kyrgyzstan) Dmitry Gvazava	(Italy) Massimo Ciglia (Italy) Giuseppe Fascicolo	**(Belgium) Gilles Stadsbader** **(Italy) Piergiacomo Randazzo**	(Italy) Vincenzo Scarpetta
8	R2	(Italy) Autodromo Internazionale Enzo e Dino Ferrari	29 October	(Italy) No. 20 Iron Lynx	**(Italy) No. 63 Vincenzo Sospiri Racing**	(Italy) No. 20 Iron Lynx	(Italy) No. 16 Imperiale Racing	**(Italy) No. 172 Lamborghini Roma DL Racing**	(Denmark) No. 290 Formula Racing
8	R2	(Italy) Autodromo Internazionale Enzo e Dino Ferrari	29 October	(Italy) Matteo Cressoni (Italy) Claudio Schiavoni	**(Italy) Edoardo Liberati** **(Italy) Mattia Michelotto**	(Italy) Matteo Cressoni (Italy) Claudio Schiavoni	(Italy) Massimo Ciglia (Italy) Giuseppe Fascicolo	**(Italy) Luca Segù** **(Sweden) Daniel Vebster**	(Italy) Vincenzo Scarpetta
