= Stefano Gai =

Italian racing driver (born 1985)

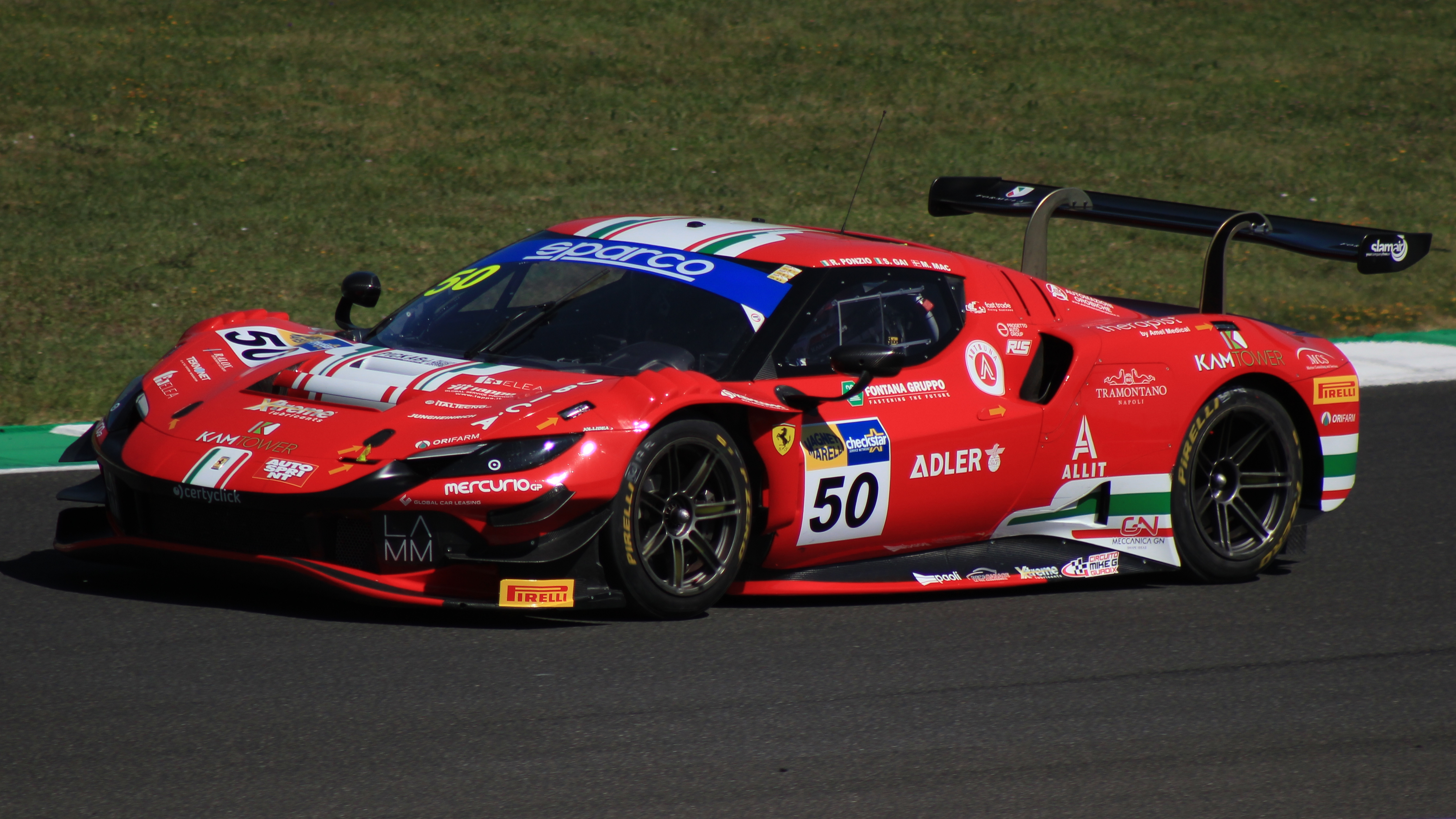
- Gai in 2024
- Nationality: (Italy) Italian
- Born: 11 December 1985 (age 40) Milan, Italy
- Categorisation: FIA Silver

Championship titles
- 2026 2025 2019 2016 2014 2010, 2011 2009: Italian GT Championship Sprint Cup – GT3 Am; Italian GT Championship Endurance Cup – GT Cup Div.1 Pro-Am; Italian GT Championship Endurance Cup – GT3; Italian GT Championship – Super GT3; Blancpain Endurance Series – Pro-Am; Ferrari Challenge Italy – Trofeo Pirelli; Ferrari Challenge Italy – Coppa Shell

Stefano Gai (born 11 December 1985) is an Italian racing driver who last competed in the Italian GT Championship for Spirit of Race. He has amassed titles in Ferrari Challenge, Italian GT and the Blancpain Endurance Series.

== Career ==
Gai began his racing career in 2007, competing in Ferrari Challenge Italy's Coppa Shell class, which he won in 2009 driving a Ferrari F430. Stepping up to Trofeo Pirelli for 2010, Gai won the series title on his debut year, before successfully defending it in 2011 in a Ferrari 458, his third series title in as many seasons.

Switching to Ferrari Challenge Europe for 2012, Gai finished fourth in the Trofeo Pirelli standings for Ferrari Moscow with four podiums to his name. In parallel, Gai raced for Ferrari-aligned AF Corse in the FIA GT3 European Championship alongside Michael Lyons, scoring five podiums in the six-round season en route to runner-up honours in the overall standings. Continuing with AF Corse for 2013, Gai raced with them in the GTC class of the European Le Mans Series, taking four podiums and securing runner-up honours in class along with Lorenzo Casè and Andrea Rizzoli. The following year, Gai joined Ferrari-fielding Scuderia Villorba Corse to compete in the Blancpain Endurance Series, clinching the Pro-Am title alongside Rizzoli, despite not winning a race and scoring three podiums.

After making his full-time debut in Italian GT in 2015 for a variety of teams, Gai joined Black Bull Swiss Racing to enter the following season with Mirko Venturi in the Super GT3 class. Kicking off the season by winning at Monza and Misano, the Ferrari 488 GT3 crew then scored further wins at Imola and Mugello to take the title. Continuing with the team for 2017, Gai won three races with Venturi, one solo and another with Michele Rugolo to secure runner-up honours in the Super GT3 Pro standings. Switching to Ferrari-affiliated Scuderia Baldini 27 for 2018, Gai took four wins alongside Giancarlo Fisichella to end the year runner-up in the GT3 standings. Continuing with the team for 2019, albeit only racing in the four-race Endurance Cup, Gai won the season finale at Mugello together with Antonio Fuoco to secure the overall GT3 title.

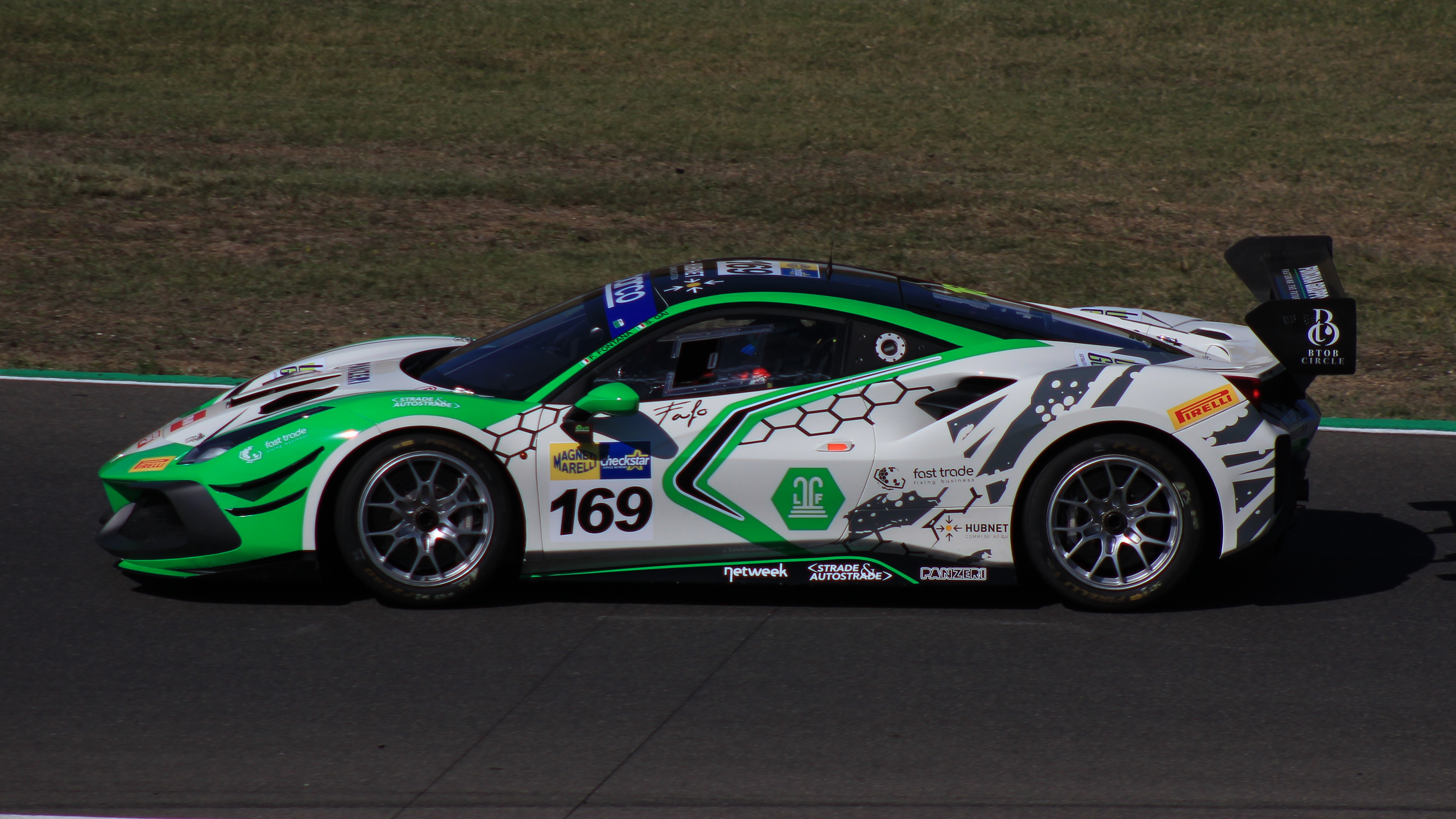
Gai driving a Ferrari 488 Challenge Evo at Mugello in 2023.

Following a one-off appearance for AF Corse in 2020, Gai returned to Baldini and full-time competition in the Endurance Cup the following year, taking three podiums and finishing third in the GT3 standings. After running most of the Sprint Cup calendar in 2022 between Baldini and AF Corse, Gai continued with the latter to race in the Endurance Cup in 2023, taking three podiums to secure a third-place points finish in GT3 Pro-Am. With AF Corse switching to the Ferrari 296 GT3 for 2024, Gai took a lone overall win at Mugello with Mikkel Mac and Riccardo Ponzio en route to a fifth-place overall finish and third in Pro-Am. Gai then raced for AF Corse–run Spirit of Race in the GT Cup Division 1 Pro-Am class in 2025, winning at Misano and taking two other podiums to clinch the class title with Fabrizio Fontana.

In 2026, Gai returned to GT3 machinery, partnering Fontana at Spirit of Race in both the Italian GT Championship Endurance and Sprint Cups in GT3 Am. Between the two campaigns, Gai found more success in the Sprint Cup, where he took class wins at Vallelunga and Monza and clinched the GT3 Am title.

== Racing record ==
=== Racing career summary ===
Season	Series	Team	Races	Wins	Poles	F/Laps	Podiums	Points	Position
2007	Ferrari Challenge Italy – Coppa Shell	Rossocorsa	10	0	0	0	0	95	14th
2008	Ferrari Challenge Italy – Coppa Shell	Rossocorsa	14	0	0	0	0	153	6th
2009	Ferrari Challenge Italy – Coppa Shell	Rossocorsa						260	**1st**
2010	Trofeo Maserati Europe		4	0	0	0	1		
2010	Ferrari Challenge Italy – Trofeo Pirelli	Rossocorsa							**1st**
2010	Italian GT Championship – GT Cup	Rossocorsa	2	0	0	0	0		
2010	6 Hours of Vallelunga	AF Corse	1	0	0	0	0	—N/a	12th
2011	Ferrari Challenge Italy – Trofeo Pirelli								**1st**
2011	Trofeo Maserati Europe		4	1	2	0	3	37	6th
2011	Italian GT Championship – GT2	AF Corse	2	2	?	?	2	40	NC
2012	Ferrari Challenge Europe – Trofeo Pirelli	Ferrari Moscow	12	0	0	0	4	123	4th
2012	FIA GT3 European Championship	AF Corse	12	0	1	0	5	158	**2nd**
2013	European Le Mans Series – GTC	AF Corse	5	0	0	0	4	76	**2nd**
2013	Ferrari Challenge Europe – Trofeo Pirelli	Rossocorsa	4	0	1	0	2	54	10th
2014	Blancpain Endurance Series – Pro-Am	Scuderia Villorba Corse	5	0	0	0	3	96	**1st**
2014	Ferrari Challenge Europe – Trofeo Pirelli	Rossocorsa	2	1	1	1	2	35	7th
2015	Italian GT Championship – GT3	Team Malucelli	4	0	0	0	0	35	14th
2015	Italian GT Championship – GT3	Stefano Gai	2	0	0	0	0	35	14th
2015	Italian GT Championship – GT3	Sport Garage	2	0	0	0	0	35	14th
2015	Italian GT Championship – GT3	Ombra Racing	4	0	0	0	0	35	14th
2016	Italian GT Championship – Super GT3	Black Bull Swiss Racing	14	4	2	3	7	147	**1st**
2017	Italian GT Championship – Super GT3 Pro	Black Bull Swiss Racing	14	5	2	0	7	156	**2nd**
2018	Italian GT Championship – GT3	Scuderia Baldini 27	14	4	1	0	6	154	**2nd**
2019	Italian GT Championship Endurance Cup – GT3	Scuderia Baldini 27	4	1	0	0	3	42	**1st**
2020	Italian GT Championship Endurance Cup – GT3 Pro-Am	AF Corse	1	0	0	0	1	12	8th
2021	Italian GT Championship Endurance Cup – GT3	Scuderia Baldini 27	4	0	0	0	3	42	**3rd**
2022	Italian GT Championship Sprint Cup – GT3	Scuderia Baldini 27	6	0	0	0	2	52	8th
2022	Italian GT Championship Sprint Cup – GT3	AF Corse	2	0	0	0	0	52	8th
2022	Italian GT Championship Sprint Cup – GT3 Pro-Am	AF Corse	2	0	0	0	1	22	NC
2023	Italian GT Championship Endurance Cup – GT3	AF Corse	4	0	0	0	1	35	4th
2023	Italian GT Championship Endurance Cup – GT3 Pro-Am	AF Corse	4	0	0	0	3	45	**3rd**
2023	Italian GT Championship Sprint Cup – GT Cup Pro-Am	Formula Racing	4	0	0	0	1	36	NC
2024	Italian GT Championship Endurance Cup – GT3	AF Corse	4	1	0	0	1	42.5	5th
2024	Italian GT Championship Endurance Cup – GT3 Pro-Am	AF Corse	4	1	0	0	2	64.5	**3rd**
2025	GT Winter Series – Cup 1	AF Corse	3	0	0	0	0	34	14th
2025	Italian GT Championship Endurance Cup – GT Cup Div.1 Pro-Am	Spirit of Race	4	1	0	0	3	97	**1st**
2026	Italian GT Championship Endurance Cup – GT3	Spirit of Race	4	0	0	0	0	0	NC
2026	Italian GT Championship Endurance Cup – GT3 Am	Spirit of Race	4	0	2	0	0	11	19th
2026	Italian GT Championship Sprint Cup – GT3	Spirit of Race	6	0	0	0	0	3	19th
2026	Italian GT Championship Sprint Cup – GT3 Am	Spirit of Race	6	2	1	1	6	97	**1st**

^{†} As Gai was a guest driver, he was ineligible for points.
* Season still in progress.

=== Complete FIA GT3 European Championship results ===
(key) (Races in bold indicate pole position; races in italics indicate fastest lap)

Year	Entrant	Chassis	Engine	1	2	3	4	5	6	7	8	9	10	11	12	Pos.	Points
2012	AF Corse	Ferrari 458 Italia GT3	Ferrari F136F 4.5 L V8	NOG; 1; 2	NOG; 2; 3	**ZOL**; **1**; 3	ZOL; 2; 5	NAV; 1; 2	NAV; 2; 6	ALG; 1; 4	ALG; 2; 4	MSC; 1; 6	MSC; 2; 4	NUR; 1; 2	NUR; 2; 4	2nd	158

=== Complete European Le Mans Series results ===
(key) (Races in bold indicate pole position; results in italics indicate fastest lap)

Year	Entrant	Class	Chassis	Engine	1	2	3	4	5	Rank	Points
2013	AF Corse	GTC	Ferrari 458 Italia GT3	Ferrari F136 4.5 L V8	SIL; 2	IMO; 2	RBR; 2	**HUN**; 3	LEC; 7	2nd	76

=== Complete GT World Challenge Europe results ===
==== GT World Challenge Europe Endurance Cup ====
(key) (Races in bold indicate pole position) (Races in italics indicate fastest lap)

Year	Team	Car	Class	1	2	3	4	5	6	7	Pos.	Points
2014	Scuderia Villorba Corse	Ferrari 458 Italia GT3	Pro-Am	MNZ; 9	SIL; 14	LEC; 8	SPA; 6H; 10	SPA; 12H; 7	SPA; 24H; 15	NÜR; 7	1st	96
