= 2021 Ferrari Challenge Europe =

The 2021 Ferrari Challenge Europe was the 29th season of Ferrari Challenge Europe and its predecessor Ferrari Challenge Italy. The season consists of 7 rounds, starting at the Autodromo Nazionale Monza on 10 April 2021 and ending at the Autodromo Internazionale del Mugello during the Ferrari World Finals on 20 November 2021

Michelle Gatting became the first female to be crowned the overall champion of Ferrari Challenge Europe Trofeo Pirelli.

== Calendar ==
The season consists of 14 races run at seven different circuits in Europe.

Rnd.	Circuit	Dates	Map
1	(Italy) Autodromo Nazionale Monza	10–11 April	2021 Ferrari Challenge Europe is located in Europe
2	(Austria) Red Bull Ring	1–2 May	2021 Ferrari Challenge Europe is located in Europe
3	(Czech Republic) Automotodrom Brno	29–30 May	2021 Ferrari Challenge Europe is located in Europe
4	(Spain) Circuit Ricardo Tormo	19–20 June	2021 Ferrari Challenge Europe is located in Europe
5	(Germany) Nürburgring	28–29 August	2021 Ferrari Challenge Europe is located in Europe
6	(Belgium) Circuit de Spa-Francorchamps	11–12 September	2021 Ferrari Challenge Europe is located in Europe
7	(Italy) Autodromo Internazionale del Mugello	19–20 November	2021 Ferrari Challenge Europe is located in Europe

== Entry list ==
All teams and drivers used the Ferrari 488 Challenge Evo fitted with Pirelli tyres.

=== Trofeo Pirelli ===
Team	No.	Driver	Class	Rounds
(France) SF Côte d'Azur Cannes	2	(France) Ange Barde	Pro-Am	All
(Italy) Rossocorsa	3	(Italy) Niccolò Schirò	Pro	3–7
(Italy) Rossocorsa	27	(Italy) Marco Pulcini	Pro-Am	All
(Italy) Rossocorsa	97	(Italy) Tommaso Rocca	Pro-Am	4–7
(Denmark) Formula Racing	4	(Denmark) Christian Brunsborg	Pro-Am	All
(Denmark) Formula Racing	25	(Italy) Alessandro Cozzi	Pro-Am	All
(Denmark) Formula Racing	39	(China) Hui-Lin Han	Pro-Am	7
(Denmark) Formula Racing	66	(Finland) Luka Nurmi	Pro	All
(Denmark) Formula Racing	88	(France) François Lansard	Pro-Am	All
(Denmark) Formula Racing	98	(Denmark) Frederik Paulsen	Pro	All
(France) Charles Pozzi - Courage	6	(France) Thomas Neubauer	Pro	4–5, 7
(Czech Republic) Scuderia Praha	7	(Slovakia) Matúš Výboh	Pro	1–3
(Switzerland) Octane126	7	(Germany) Luca Ludwig	Pro	5–7
(Switzerland) Kessel Racing	8	(Switzerland) Nicolò Rosi	Pro-Am	All
(Germany) Ulrich Frankfurt	9	(Germany) Oliver Plaßmann	Pro-Am	1–4, 6–7
(Switzerland) (Italy) Scuderia Niki Hasler - Iron Lynx	13	(Germany) Arno Dahlmeyer	Pro-Am	All
(Switzerland) (Italy) Scuderia Niki Hasler - Iron Lynx	83	(Denmark) Michelle Gatting	Pro	All
(Switzerland) (Italy) Scuderia Niki Hasler - Iron Lynx	84	(France) Doriane Pin	Pro	7
(United Kingdom) HR Owen	16	(Netherlands) Han Sikkens	Pro-Am	7
(United Kingdom) HR Owen	76	(Saudi Arabia) Faisal Al-Faisal	Pro-Am	7
(United Kingdom) HR Owen	99	(United Arab Emirates) Omar Jackson	Pro-Am	All
(Monaco) Scuderia Monte-Carlo	21	(France) Hugo Delacour	Pro-Am	All
Francorchamps Motors Luxembourg - D2P	26	(Belgium) John Wartique	Pro	All
Francorchamps Motors Luxembourg - D2P	73	(Poland) Roman Ziemian	Pro-Am	7
Francorchamps Motors Luxembourg - D2P	80	(Luxembourg) Jorge Daniel Pinto	Pro-Am	1–4,6
(Italy) CDP - MP Racing	50	(Italy) David Gostner	Pro-Am	
(Spain) Santogal Madrid - MST Team	63	(Spain) Sergio Paulet	Pro-Am	All
(Netherlands) Kroymans - Race Art	77	(Netherlands) Roger Grouwels	Pro-Am	All
(Germany) Riller und Schnauck	85	(Germany) Hanno Laskowski	Pro-Am	1–2, 5–7

=== Coppa Shell ===
Team	No.	Driver	Class	Rounds
(Belgium) Francorchamps Motors Brussels	100	(Belgium) Peter Stockmans	Am	6
(Italy) Sa.Mo.Car	101	(Italy) Paolo Scudieri	Am	1, 3–5, 7
(Switzerland) (Italy) Scuderia Niki Hasler - Iron Lynx	102	(Italy) Claudio Schiavoni	Pro-Am	1, 7
(United Kingdom) HR Owen	107	(United Kingdom) Jonathan Satchell	Am	7
(United Kingdom) HR Owen	155	(Belgium) Laurent de Meeus	Am	1–2, 6–7
(Austria) Baron Motorsport	109	(Austria) Ernst Kirchmayr	Pro-Am	All
(Austria) Baron Motorsport	127	(Sweden) Thomas Lindroth	Am	All
(Austria) Baron Motorsport	159	(Germany) Matthias Moser	Am	1–3, 5–6
(Austria) Baron Motorsport	196	(Austria) Michael Simoncić	Am	1–2, 7
(Germany) MERTEL Italo Cars Nürnberg	111	(Germany) Martinus Richter	Am	1–6
(Italy) Rossocorsa	118	(United States) James Weiland	Pro-Am	All
(Italy) Rossocorsa	168	(United Kingdom) Germana Tognella	Am	1–4
(Italy) Rossocorsa	172	(Italy) Giuseppe Ramelli	Am	1–4, 6–7
(United Kingdom) JCT600 Brooklands	119	(United Kingdom) Paul Rogers	Am	7
(Belgium) Scuderia FMA	120	(Belgium) Guy Fawe	Pro-Am	1–2, 4–6
(Denmark) Formula Racing	121	(Denmark) Peter Christensen	Am	4–7
(Denmark) Formula Racing	128	(Sweden) Christian Kinch	Pro-Am	All
(Denmark) Formula Racing	132	(Denmark) Henrik Kamstrup	Am	7
(Czech Republic) Scuderia Praha	122	(Slovakia) Miroslav Výboh	Am	1–3
(Czech Republic) Scuderia Praha	163	(Czech Republic) Renè Matera	Am	7
(Sweden) Scuderia Autoropa	126	(Sweden) Joakim Olander	Am	All
(Sweden) Scuderia Autoropa	199	(Sweden) Ingvar Mattsson	Am	4–7
(Germany) Gohm Motorsport	136	(Austria) Alexander Nußbaumer	Am	3, 5, 7
(France) SF Grand Est Mulhouse	139	(France) "Alex Fox"	Pro-Am	1–4
(Switzerland) Kessel Racing	140	(Switzerland) Giuseppe Frascaro	Am	7
(Switzerland) Kessel Racing	177	(Netherlands) Fons Scheltema	Am	All
(Germany) Moll Sportwagen Hannover	150	(Germany) Werner Genter	Am	2–7
(Italy) CDP - MP Racing/Best Lap	161	(Italy) Thomas Gostner	Pro-Am	7
(Italy) CDP - MP Racing/Best Lap	173	(Italy) Corinna Gostner	Pro-Am	7
(Italy) CDP - MP Racing/Best Lap	181	(Italy) Maurizio Pitorri	Am	1, 4, 7
(Germany) Lüg Sportivo	178	(Germany) Axel Sartingen	Pro-Am	All
(Monaco) Scuderia Monte Carlo	182	(Netherlands) Willem van der Vorm	Am	All
(Germany) Saggio München	183	(Germany) Christian Herdt-Wipper	Pro-Am	5, 7
(Germany) Eberlein Automobile	197	(Germany) Josef Schumacher	Am	All

== Results and standings ==
=== Race results ===
Round	Race	Circuit	Pole position	Fastest lap	Trofeo Pirelli Winners	Coppa Shell Winners
1	1	(Italy) Autodromo Nazionale Monza	TP Pro: (Finland) Luka Nurmi; TP Pro-Am: (France) Ange Barde; CS Pro-Am: (Germany) Axel Sartingen; CS Am: (Sweden) Joakim Olander	TP Pro: (Denmark) Michelle Gatting; TP Pro-Am: (France) Ange Barde; CS Pro-Am: (Germany) Axel Sartingen; CS Am: (Italy) Giuseppe Ramelli	Pro: (Denmark) Michelle Gatting; Scuderia Niki - Iron Lynx; Pro-Am: (France) Ange Barde; SF Côte d'Azur Cannes	Pro-Am: (United States) James Weiland; Rossocorsa; Am: (Italy) Giuseppe Ramelli; Rossocorsa - Pellin Racin
1	2	(Italy) Autodromo Nazionale Monza	TP Pro: (Finland) Luka Nurmi; TP Pro-Am: (Spain) Sergio Paulet; CS Pro-Am: (Austria) Ernst Kirchmayr; CS Am: (Sweden) Joakim Olander	TP Pro: (Finland) Luka Nurmi; TP Pro-Am: (France) Hugo Delacour; CS Pro-Am: (Netherlands) Fons Scheltema; CS Am: (Sweden) Joakim Olander	Pro: (Finland) Luka Nurmi; Formula Racing; Pro-Am: (Spain) Sergio Paulet; Santogal Madrid - MST Team	Pro-Am: (France) "ALEX FOX"; SF Grand Est Mulhous; Am: (Italy) Giuseppe Ramelli; Rossocorsa - Pellin Racin

=== Championship standings ===
Points were awarded to the top ten classified finishers as follows:

Race Position	1st	2nd	3rd	4th	5th	6th	7th	8th or lower	Pole	FLap	Entry
Points	15	12	10	8	6	4	2	1	1	1	1

Trofeo Pirelli

Pos.	Driver	(Italy) MNZ		(Austria) RBR		(Czech Republic) BRN		(Spain) VAL		(Germany) NÜR		(Belgium) SPA		(Italy) MUG		Points
Pos.	Driver	R1	R2	R1	R2	R1	R2	R1	R2	R1	R2	R1	R2	R1	R2	Points
Pro Class
1	(Denmark) Michelle Gatting	1	2	1	1	2	3	3	2	3	2	3	6	4	3	171
2	(Italy) Niccolò Schirò					1	1	1	1	1	4	2	1	2	2	148
3	(Finland) Luka Nurmi	Ret	1	2	3	3	5	5	4	7	1	5	5	1	1	140
4	(Belgium) John Wartique	3	3	3	2	4	4	4	Ret	6	6	1	2	Ret	DNS	109
5	(Denmark) Frederik Paulsen	4	4	5	5	5	6	6	5	5	5	6	4	3	4	98
6	(Slovakia) Matús Výboh	2	5	4	4	6	2									53
7	(Germany) Luca Ludwig									4	3	4	3	7	5	47
8	(France) Thomas Neubauer							2	3	2	7			5	DNS	45
9	(France) Doriane Pin													6	6	9
Pro-Am Class

Coppa Shell

Pos.	Driver	(Italy) MNZ		(Austria) RBR		(Czech Republic) BRN		(Spain) VAL		(Germany) NÜR		(Belgium) SPA		(Italy) MUG		Points
Pos.	Driver	R1	R2	R1	R2	R1	R2	R1	R2	R1	R2	R1	R2	R1	R2	Points
Pro-Am Class
Am Class
