= Luka Nurmi =

Finnish racing driver

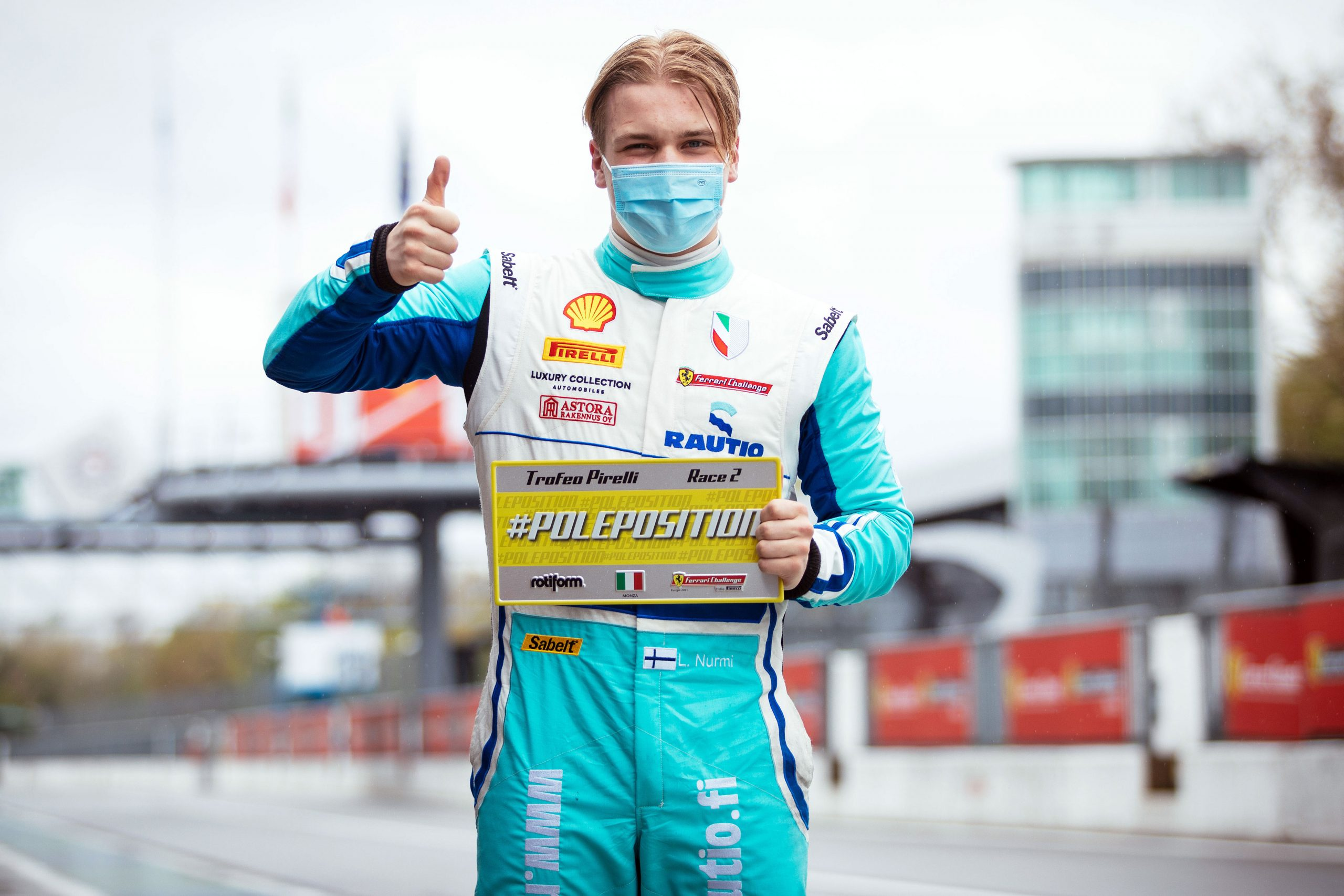
- Nationality: (Finland) Finnish
- Born: Luka Adolf Nurmi; 26 April 2004 (age 22) Tampere, Finland
- Categorisation: FIA Silver

Previous series
- 2019 2019 2020 2020 2021 2021: RX Academy Porsche Sprint Challenge NEZ 2019; Porsche Sprint Challenge NEZ 2020; Legends Finland 2020; Legends Finland 2021 Ferrari Challenge 2021

Championship titles
- 2020 2021 2021 2022: Porsche Sprint Challenge NEZ Legends Finland; Legends Finland Ferrari Challenge 2021

Luka Adolf Nurmi (born 26 April 2004) is a Finnish racing driver. He has won the title of Ferrari Challenge World Championship as well as the Porsche Sprint Challenge NEZ Series and is known to be their youngest competitor. He has won medals in the Karting Finnish Championship series and won the Championship in Finland's most popular circuit racing series, Legends and is also known as the youngest driver in its history.

Transitioning from Kart Racing, Nurmi is currently racing the International GT-series.

== Career ==
=== Karting 2009–2018 ===
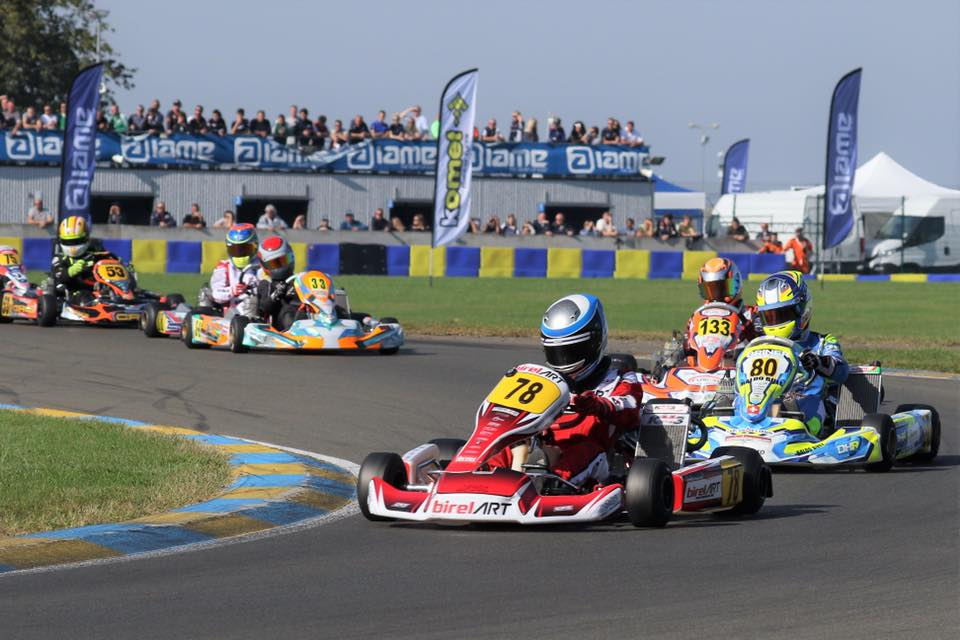
Nurmi started his motorsport career in karting. He competed in various series from 2009 to 2018.

Born in Tampere, Finland, at age of five Nurmi started competing in karting as he became interested in the world of motorsport. He won a silver medal in the Rotax Max Finland series, bronze medal in BNL series and bronze medal in Rotax MAX Challenge World Championships.

In the 2017 season, Nurmi won a silver medal in the OKj-group of The Karting Finnish Championship series along with being awarded the title of Finnish Newcomer driver.

In the 2018 season, Nurmi continued in The Finnish Karting Championship series and won bronze medal in the OK-group.

=== RX Academy 2019 ===
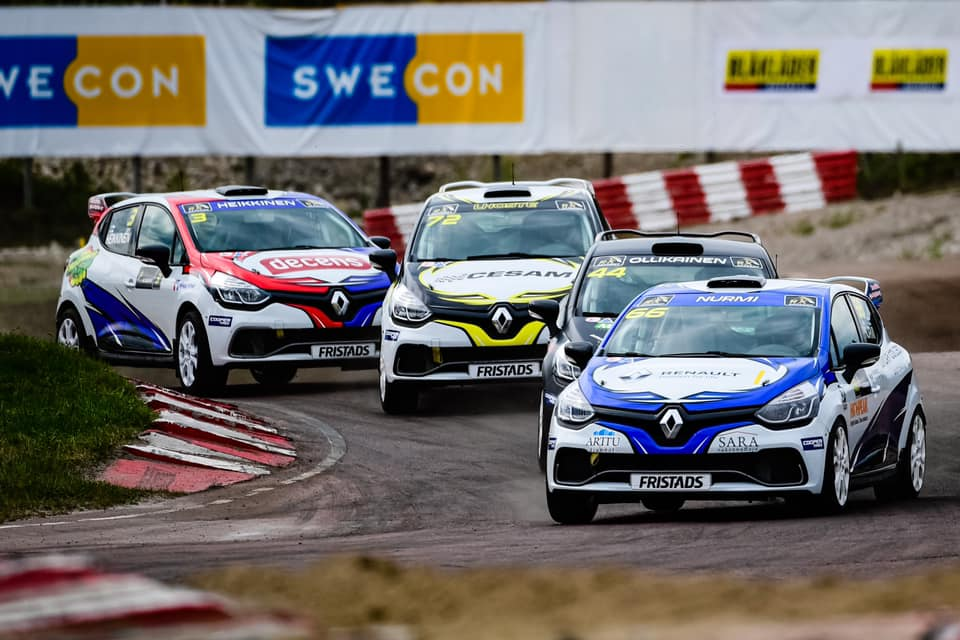
In season 2019 Nurmi collect 5th position in RX Academy series.

The RX Academy, which was run by Jussi and Kalle Pinomäki (SET Promotion), was driven by Renault Clio RS cars in the Nordic and the Baltic countries. In addition to driving, the academy included physics, mental as well as media coaching. For Nurmi the racing season, which ended in fifth place in the series.

=== Porsche Sprint Challenge NEZ 2020–2021 ===
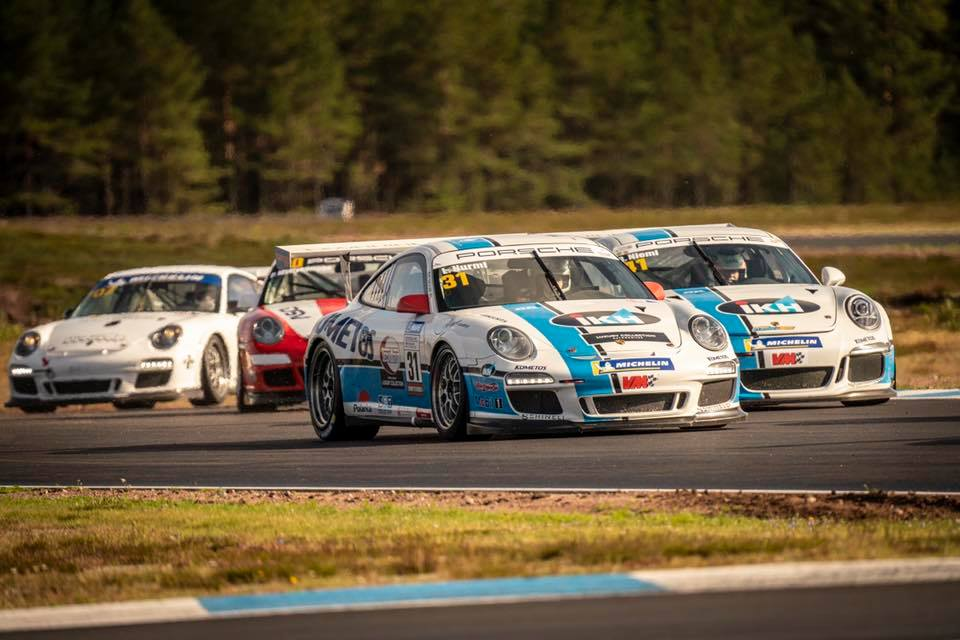
Nurmi won the Porsche Sprint Challenge NEZ series as the youngest driver in its history.

Finnish Relaa Racing team chose Nurmi for its junior driver to Porsche Sprint Challenge NEZ Racing series for seasons 2020 and 2021. Nurmi thanked the team manager Raimo Niemi for the trust he had give as in his first GT year Nurmi won the bronze medal of the series. After fierceful driving in next year he improved two positions and won the Championship title as the youngest driver to win the Porsche Sprint Challenge NEZ racing series in its history.

=== Legends 2020–2021 ===
Nurmi successfully competed in Legends, which has become the most popular circuit racing series in Finland. In season 2020 he won the Semi-PRO Championship series and in 2021 the PRO Championship series. In both classes, he collect the titles as the youngest driver in the series history.

=== Ferrari Challenge Europe 2021 ===
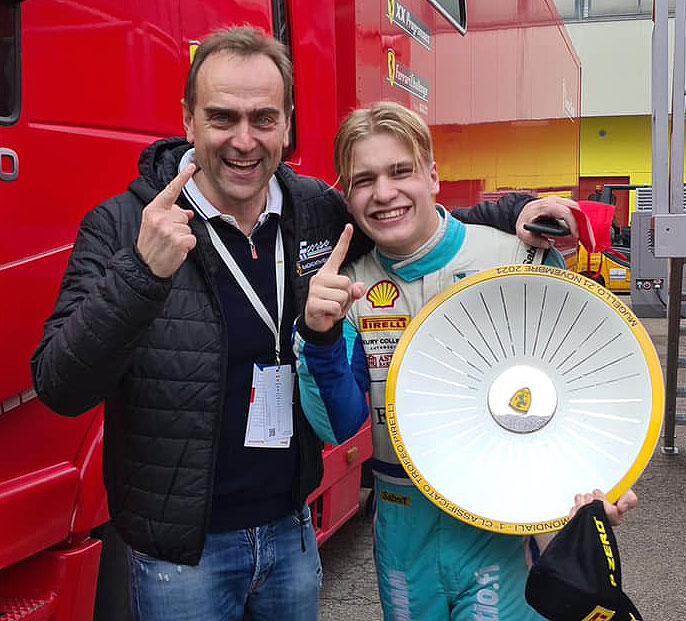
Nurmi won the Ferrari Challenge World Championship series as the youngest driver in its history.

== Career highlights ==
- 2016: Karting Rotax MAX Challenge Finland Silver
- 2016: Karting BNL-series Bronze (Rotax)
- 2016: Rotax MAX Challenge World Finals Bronze
- 2017: Karting Finnish Championship series Silver (OKj)
- 2017: Finnish Rookie of the Year
- 2018: Karting Finnish Championship series Bronze (OK)
- 2019: RalliCross RX-Academy: 5th
- 2019: Porsche Sprint Challenge NEZ Bronze
- 2020: Legends Finland Champion (Semi-Pro)
- 2020: Porsche Sprint Challenge NEZ Champion
- 2021: Legends Finland Champion (Pro)
- 2021: Ferrari Challenge Europe Bronze Medal
- 2021: Ferrari Challenge World Finals Champion

== Racing record ==
=== Career summary ===
Season	Series	Team	Races	Wins	Poles	F/Laps	Podiums	Points	Position
2019	Porsche Sprint Challenge NEZ	Relaa Racing	12	2	4	6	10	?	3rd
2020	Porsche Sprint Challenge NEZ	Relaa Racing	12	6	7	6	11	320	1st
2020	Legends Trophy Finland - Semi-Pro	Iceboys Racing	6	0	1	0	0	500	1st
2020	Lamborghini Super Trofeo Europe	Leipert Motorsport	?	?	?	?	?	?	?
2021	Ferrari Challenge Europe - Trofeo Pirelli (Pro)	Formula Racing	14	4	3	4	8	140	3rd
2021	Ferrari Challenge Finali Mondiali - Trofeo Pirelli (Pro)	Formula Racing	1	1	0	1	1	N/A	1st
2021	NASCAR Whelen Euro Series - EuroNASCAR Pro	Iceboys	2	0	0	0	0	118	25th
2022	Ferrari Challenge Europe - Trofeo Pirelli (Pro)	Formula Racing	14	0	0	0	9	139	3rd
2023	Italian GT Sprint Championship - GT3	AF Corse	8	0	0	0	0	32	8th
2023	Italian GT Sprint Championship - GT3 Pro-Am	AF Corse	8	2	0	0	5	95	2nd
2024	Italian GT Sprint Championship - GT3 Pro	AF Corse	8	0	1	1	3	38	8th

* Season still in progress.
