= 2022 Italian GT Championship =

Italian Motorsports Championship

The 2022 Italian GT Championship was the 31st season of the Italian GT Championship, the grand tourer-style sports car racing series founded by the Italian automobile club (Automobile Club d'Italia). The Championship consisted of four Sprint race events and four Endurance race events. At each Sprint race event there were two races. The season started on 23 April at Monza and ended on 23 October at Autodromo Internazionale del Mugello.

== Calendar ==
Round	Circuit	Date	Type
1	Autodromo Nazionale di Monza	21–24 April	Sprint
2	Autodromo di Pergusa	12–15 May	Endurance
3	Misano World Circuit Marco Simoncelli	2–5 June	Sprint
4	Autodromo Internazionale del Mugello	14–17 July	Endurance
5	Autodromo Internazionale Enzo e Dino Ferrari	1–4 September	Sprint
6	ACI Vallelunga Circuit	15–18 September	Endurance
7	Autodromo Nazionale di Monza	6–9 October	Endurance
8	Autodromo Internazionale del Mugello	20–23 October	Sprint

== Teams and drivers ==
=== GT3 ===
Team	Car	No.	Driver	Class	Rounds
(San Marino) Audi Sport Italia	Audi R8 LMS Evo II	1	(Italy) Marco Butti	Am	1, 3, 5, 8
(San Marino) Audi Sport Italia	Audi R8 LMS Evo II	1	(Italy) Simone Patrinicola	Am	1, 3, 5, 8
(Italy) Easy Race	Ferrari 488 GT3 Evo 2020	3	(Italy) Riccardo Agostini	P	1–3, 5, 8
(Italy) Easy Race	Ferrari 488 GT3 Evo 2020	3	(Switzerland) Daniel Vebster	P	1, 3, 5, 8
(Italy) Easy Race	Ferrari 488 GT3 Evo 2020	3	(Italy) Vito Postiglione	P	2
(Italy) Easy Race	Ferrari 488 GT3 Evo 2020	3	(Italy) Lorenzo Patrese	P	2
(Italy) Imperiale Racing	Lamborghini Huracán GT3 Evo	6	(Italy) Alberto Di Folco	P	1, 3, 5, 8
(Italy) Imperiale Racing	Lamborghini Huracán GT3 Evo	6	(United Kingdom) Stuart Middleton	P	1, 3, 5, 8
(Italy) Imperiale Racing	Lamborghini Huracán GT3 Evo	6	(Netherlands) Daan Pijl	P	2, 4, 6–7
(Italy) Imperiale Racing	Lamborghini Huracán GT3 Evo	6	(Mexico) Raúl Guzmán	P	2, 4, 6–7
(Italy) Imperiale Racing	Lamborghini Huracán GT3 Evo	6	(Guatemala) Mateo Llarena	P	4, 6–7
(Italy) Imperiale Racing	Lamborghini Huracán GT3 Evo	9	(Lithuania) Paul August	Am	1, 3, 5, 8
(Italy) Imperiale Racing	Lamborghini Huracán GT3 Evo	9	(Italy) Riccardo Ponzio	PA	4, 6–7
(Italy) Imperiale Racing	Lamborghini Huracán GT3 Evo	9	(Republic of Ireland) James Roe	PA	4, 6–7
(Italy) Imperiale Racing	Lamborghini Huracán GT3 Evo	9	(Germany) Sebastian Balthasar	PA	4, 6–7
(Switzerland) Kessel Racing	Ferrari 488 GT3 Evo 2020	8	(Italy) Leonardo Maria del Vecchio	Am	7
(Switzerland) Kessel Racing	Ferrari 488 GT3 Evo 2020	8	(Italy) Alessandro Cutera	Am	7
(Switzerland) Kessel Racing	Ferrari 488 GT3 Evo 2020	8	(Italy) Marco Talarico	Am	7
(Italy) Antonelli Motorsport	Mercedes-AMG GT3 Evo	17	(Germany) Florian Scholze	PA	2, 4, 6–7
(Italy) Antonelli Motorsport	Mercedes-AMG GT3 Evo	17	(Italy) Kikko Galbiati	PA	2, 4, 6–7
(Italy) Antonelli Motorsport	Mercedes-AMG GT3 Evo	17	(Italy) Kikko Galbiati	P	1, 3, 5, 8
(Italy) Antonelli Motorsport	Mercedes-AMG GT3 Evo	17	(Italy) Matteo Cressoni	P	1, 5, 8
(Italy) Antonelli Motorsport	Mercedes-AMG GT3 Evo	17	(Netherlands) Paul Meijer	P	3
(Italy) Antonelli Motorsport	Mercedes-AMG GT3 Evo	44	(Italy) Emidio Pesce	P	1
(Italy) Antonelli Motorsport	Mercedes-AMG GT3 Evo	44	(Germany) Jop Rappange	P	1
(Italy) Antonelli Motorsport	Mercedes-AMG GT3 Evo	44	(Italy) Emidio Pesce	PA	2–8
(Italy) Antonelli Motorsport	Mercedes-AMG GT3 Evo	44	(Germany) Jop Rappange	PA	2–8
(Italy) Antonelli Motorsport	Mercedes-AMG GT3 Evo	44	(Italy) Francesca Linossi	PA	4, 6–7
(Italy) Vincenzo Sospiri Racing	Lamborghini Huracán GT3 Evo	19	(Italy) Edoardo Liberati	P	2, 4, 6–7
(Italy) Vincenzo Sospiri Racing	Lamborghini Huracán GT3 Evo	19	(Japan) Yuki Nemoto	P	2, 4, 6–7
(Italy) Vincenzo Sospiri Racing	Lamborghini Huracán GT3 Evo	19	(Italy) Michele Beretta	P	2, 4, 6
(Italy) Vincenzo Sospiri Racing	Lamborghini Huracán GT3 Evo	63	(Poland) Karol Basz	P	2, 4, 6–7
(Italy) Vincenzo Sospiri Racing	Lamborghini Huracán GT3 Evo	63	(Chile) Benjamín Hites	P	2, 4, 6–7
(Italy) Vincenzo Sospiri Racing	Lamborghini Huracán GT3 Evo	63	(Italy) Mattia Michelotto	P	2, 4, 6–7
(Italy) Vincenzo Sospiri Racing	Lamborghini Huracán GT3 Evo	66	(Italy) Andrea Cola	PA	2, 4, 6–7
(Italy) Vincenzo Sospiri Racing	Lamborghini Huracán GT3 Evo	66	(Belgium) Baptiste Moulin	PA	2, 4, 6–7
(Germany) Huber Racing	Porsche 911 GT3 R	20	(Germany) Manuel Lauck	PA	7
(Germany) Huber Racing	Porsche 911 GT3 R	20	(Germany) Jörg Dreisow	PA	7
(Italy) AF Corse	Ferrari 488 GT3 Evo 2020	25	(Italy) Alessandro Cozzi	Am	1, 3, 5, 8
(Italy) AF Corse	Ferrari 488 GT3 Evo 2020	39	(Italy) Angelo Negro	Am	1, 3, 5
(Italy) AF Corse	Ferrari 488 GT3 Evo 2020	39	(China) Huilin Han	Am	1, 3, 5
(Italy) AF Corse	Ferrari 488 GT3 Evo 2020	39	(China) Huilin Han	PA	8
(Italy) AF Corse	Ferrari 488 GT3 Evo 2020	39	(Italy) Stefano Gai	PA	8
(Italy) Scuderia Baldini 27	Ferrari 488 GT3 Evo 2020	27	(Argentina) José Manuel Urcera	PA	1, 3, 5, 8
(Italy) Scuderia Baldini 27	Ferrari 488 GT3 Evo 2020	27	(Italy) Daniele di Amato	PA	1, 3, 5, 8
(Italy) Scuderia Baldini 27	Ferrari 488 GT3 Evo 2020	27	(Brazil) Rubens Barrichello	P	6
(Italy) Scuderia Baldini 27	Ferrari 488 GT3 Evo 2020	27	(Italy) Giancarlo Fisichella	P	6
(Italy) Scuderia Baldini 27	Ferrari 488 GT3 Evo 2020	72	(Italy) Stefano Gai	P	1, 3, 5
(Italy) Scuderia Baldini 27	Ferrari 488 GT3 Evo 2020	72	(France) Nelson Panciatici	P	1, 3, 5
(Italy) BMW Italia Ceccato Motors	BMW M4 GT3	50	(Germany) Timo Glock	P	1, 3, 5, 8
(Italy) BMW Italia Ceccato Motors	BMW M4 GT3	50	(Germany) Jens Klingmann	P	1, 3, 5, 8
(Italy) BMW Italia Ceccato Motors	BMW M4 GT3	50	(Italy) Stefano Comandini	PA	2, 4, 6–7
(Italy) BMW Italia Ceccato Motors	BMW M4 GT3	50	(Italy) Giuseppe Fascicolo	PA	2, 4, 6–7
(Italy) BMW Italia Ceccato Motors	BMW M4 GT3	50	(Sweden) Alfred Nilsson	PA	2, 4, 6–7
(Italy) Nova Race	Honda NSX GT3 Evo22	55	(Italy) Leonardo Moncini	P	All
(Italy) Nova Race	Honda NSX GT3 Evo22	55	(Italy) Jacoppo Guidetti	P	All
(Italy) Nova Race	Honda NSX GT3 Evo22	55	(Spain) Jorge Cabezas	P	2, 4, 6–7
(Italy) Nova Race	Honda NSX GT3 Evo22	77	(Italy) Luca Magnoni	Am	1–7
(Italy) Nova Race	Honda NSX GT3 Evo22	77	(Italy) Alberto Lippi	Am	1, 4
(Italy) Nova Race	Honda NSX GT3 Evo22	77	(Italy) Diego di Fabio	Am	2–4, 6–7
(Italy) Nova Race	Honda NSX GT3 Evo22	77	(Hong Kong) Paul Ip	Am	8
(Italy) Nova Race	Honda NSX GT3 Evo22	77	(Hong Kong) Marchy Lee	Am	8
(Italy) Nova Race	Honda NSX GT3 Evo22	99	(Italy) Francesco Guerra	PA	1, 3, 5, 8
(Italy) Nova Race	Honda NSX GT3 Evo22	99	(Italy) Matteo Greco	PA	1, 3, 5, 8
(Italy) Nova Race	Honda NSX GT3 Evo22	99	(China) Yao Liangbo	Am	6
(Italy) Nova Race	Honda NSX GT3 Evo22	99	(China) Lu Zhiwei	Am	6
(Italy) Nova Race	Honda NSX GT3 Evo22	99	(Hong Kong) Paul Ip	Am	7
(Italy) Nova Race	Honda NSX GT3 Evo22	99	(Hong Kong) Marchy Lee	Am	7
(Germany) Herberth Motorsport	Porsche 911 GT3 R	69	(Germany) Ralf Bohn	PA	7
(Germany) Herberth Motorsport	Porsche 911 GT3 R	69	(Germany) Alfred Renauer	PA	7
(Germany) Herberth Motorsport	Porsche 911 GT3 R	69	(Germany) Robert Renauer	PA	7
(Italy) LP Racing	Lamborghini Huracán GT3 Evo	88	(Venezuela) Jonathan Cecotto	PA	1, 3, 5, 8
(Italy) LP Racing	Lamborghini Huracán GT3 Evo	88	(Italy) Mattia di Giusto	PA	1, 3, 5, 8
Entry Lists:

Icon	Class
P	Pro Cup
PA	Pro-Am Cup
Am	Am Cup

=== GT Cup ===
Team	Car	No.	Driver	Class	Rounds
(Ukraine) Tsunami RT	Porsche 991 GT3 II Cup	301	(Italy) Francesca Linossi	P	1, 3
(Ukraine) Tsunami RT	Porsche 991 GT3 II Cup	301	(Italy) Vittoria Piria	P	1, 3
(Ukraine) Tsunami RT	Porsche 991 GT3 II Cup	301	(Italy) Vittoria Piria	PA	5, 8
(Ukraine) Tsunami RT	Porsche 991 GT3 II Cup	301	(Italy) Giammarco Levorato	PA	5
(Ukraine) Tsunami RT	Porsche 991 GT3 II Cup	301	(Italy) Vito Postiglione	PA	8
(Ukraine) Tsunami RT	Porsche 991 GT3 II Cup	399	(Italy) Giovanni Berton	PA	1, 3
(Ukraine) Tsunami RT	Porsche 991 GT3 II Cup	399	(Italy) Lorenzo Bontempelli	PA	1, 3
(Italy) AB Motorsport	Porsche 991 GT3 II Cup	302	(Italy) Enrico di Leo	Am	1, 3, 5, 8
(Italy) AB Motorsport	Porsche 991 GT3 II Cup	302	(Italy) "Poppy"	Am	1, 3, 5, 8
(Italy) Bonaldi Motorsport	Lamborghini Huracán Super Trofeo Evo2	303	(Colombia) Andrés Méndez	P	1, 3, 5, 8
(Italy) Bonaldi Motorsport	Lamborghini Huracán Super Trofeo Evo2	306	(Italy) Giacomo Barri	PA	8
(Italy) Bonaldi Motorsport	Lamborghini Huracán Super Trofeo Evo2	306	(Italy) Eric Scalvini	PA	8
(Italy) Bonaldi Motorsport	Lamborghini Huracán Super Trofeo Evo2	332	(Serbia) Miloš Pavlović	PA	1
(Italy) Bonaldi Motorsport	Lamborghini Huracán Super Trofeo Evo2	332	(Germany) Michael Fischbaum	PA	1
(Italy) Bonaldi Motorsport	Lamborghini Huracán Super Trofeo Evo2	332	(Croatia) Martin Kodrić	PA	7
(Italy) Bonaldi Motorsport	Lamborghini Huracán Super Trofeo Evo2	332	(Croatia) Sandro Mur	PA	7
(Italy) Bonaldi Motorsport	Lamborghini Huracán Super Trofeo Evo2	351	(Italy) Fabio Vairani	PA	1–2
(Italy) Bonaldi Motorsport	Lamborghini Huracán Super Trofeo Evo2	351	(Croatia) Martin Kodrić	PA	1
(Italy) Bonaldi Motorsport	Lamborghini Huracán Super Trofeo Evo2	351	(Serbia) Miloš Pavlović	PA	2, 4, 6–7
(Italy) Bonaldi Motorsport	Lamborghini Huracán Super Trofeo Evo2	351	(Germany) Michael Fischbaum	PA	2, 4, 6–7
Team Italy	Lamborghini Huracán Super Trofeo Evo	305	(Spain) Fidel Castillo Ruiz	Am	1, 3, 5
Team Italy	Lamborghini Huracán Super Trofeo Evo	305	(Italy) Luca Maria Attianese	Am	1, 3
Team Italy	Lamborghini Huracán Super Trofeo Evo	305	(Italy) Nicholas Risitano	PA	6
Team Italy	Lamborghini Huracán Super Trofeo Evo	305	(Italy) Manuel Menichini	PA	6
Team Italy	Lamborghini Huracán Super Trofeo Evo	306	(Italy) Eric Scalvini	P	1, 3, 5
Team Italy	Lamborghini Huracán Super Trofeo Evo	306	(Italy) Giacomo Barri	P	1, 3, 5
Team Italy	Lamborghini Huracán Super Trofeo Evo	306	(Italy) Leonardo Becagli	Am	2, 4
Team Italy	Lamborghini Huracán Super Trofeo Evo	306	(Spain) Fidel Castillo Ruiz	Am	2, 4
Team Italy	Lamborghini Huracán Super Trofeo Evo	306	(Italy) Francesco La Mazza	Am	2
Team Italy	Lamborghini Huracán Super Trofeo Evo	306	(Italy) Lorenzo Pegoraro	Am	4
(China) Rexal FFF Racing Team	Lamborghini Huracán Super Trofeo Evo2	308	(Italy) Luciano Privitelio	Am	1, 4–8
(China) Rexal FFF Racing Team	Lamborghini Huracán Super Trofeo Evo2	308	(Italy) Donovan Privitelio	Am	4–8
(China) Rexal FFF Racing Team	Lamborghini Huracán Super Trofeo Evo2	310	(Portugal) Rodrigo Testa	Am	5–6, 8
(China) Rexal FFF Racing Team	Lamborghini Huracán Super Trofeo Evo2	310	(Japan) Hiroshi Hamaguchi	Am	6
(Italy) Team Lazarus	Lamborghini Huracán Super Trofeo Evo2	309	(Italy) Stefano Bozzoni	Am	2, 4, 6–7
(Italy) Team Lazarus	Lamborghini Huracán Super Trofeo Evo2	309	(Italy) Fabrizio del Monte	Am	2, 4, 6–7
(Italy) Team Lazarus	Lamborghini Huracán Super Trofeo Evo2	309	(Italy) Marco Santanocita	Am	4, 6–7
(Austria) Team Baron Motorsport	Ferrari 488 Challenge Evo	309	(Austria) Ernst Kirchmayr	PA	5
(Austria) Team Baron Motorsport	Ferrari 488 Challenge Evo	309	(Denmark) Mikkel Mac	PA	5
(Italy) Ebimotors	Porsche 991 GT3 II Cup	311	(Italy) Davide Amaduzzi	PA	1, 3, 5, 8
(Italy) Ebimotors	Porsche 991 GT3 II Cup	311	(United States) Jeffrey Nelson	PA	1, 3, 5, 8
(Italy) Ebimotors	Porsche 991 GT3 II Cup	326	(Italy) Renato Gaiofatto	PA	5
(Italy) Ebimotors	Porsche 991 GT3 II Cup	326	(Italy) Alessandro Giardelli	PA	5
(Italy) Ebimotors	Porsche 991 GT3 II Cup	371	(Italy) Gianluigi Piccioli	PA	1, 3, 5, 8
(Italy) Ebimotors	Porsche 991 GT3 II Cup	371	(Italy) Riccardo Pera	PA	1, 5, 8
(Italy) Ebimotors	Porsche 991 GT3 II Cup	371	(Italy) Vito Postiglione	PA	3
(Italy) Best Lap	Ferrari 488 Challenge Evo	312	(Italy) Giammarco Marzialetti	Am	1, 3, 5, 8
(Italy) Best Lap	Ferrari 488 Challenge Evo	312	(Italy) Giorgio Tibaldo	Am	1, 3, 5
(Italy) Best Lap	Ferrari 488 Challenge Evo	312	(Italy) Eliseo Donno	Am	8
(Italy) Best Lap	Ferrari 488 Challenge Evo	312	(Italy) Eliseo Donno	PA	2, 4
(Italy) Best Lap	Ferrari 488 Challenge Evo	312	(Italy) Nicholas Risitano	PA	2, 4
(Italy) Best Lap	Ferrari 488 Challenge Evo	312	(Italy) Manuel Menechini	PA	2, 4
(Italy) Best Lap	Ferrari 488 Challenge Evo	318	(Italy) Maurizio Pitorri	Am	3, 5
(Italy) Best Lap	Ferrari 488 Challenge Evo	318	(Italy) Gianluigi Simonelli	Am	3, 5
(Italy) Best Lap	Ferrari 488 Challenge Evo	318	(Italy) "Babalus"	PA	8
(Italy) Best Lap	Ferrari 488 Challenge Evo	318	(Italy) Gianluigi Simonelli	PA	8
(Italy) Best Lap	Ferrari 488 Challenge Evo	319	(Italy) Eliseo Donno	PA	5
(Italy) Best Lap	Ferrari 488 Challenge Evo	319	(Italy) Vito Postiglione	PA	5
(Italy) Pellin Racing	Ferrari 488 Challenge Evo	321	(United States) Matthew Krzejewski	Am	5
(Italy) Pellin Racing	Ferrari 488 Challenge Evo	387	(United States) Jeremy Clarke		5
(Italy) Krypton Motorsport	Porsche 991 GT3 II Cup	322	(Italy) Alessandro Mainetti	PA	All
(Italy) Krypton Motorsport	Porsche 991 GT3 II Cup	322	(Italy) Stefano Gattuso	PA	1–4
(Italy) Krypton Motorsport	Porsche 991 GT3 II Cup	322	(Italy) Giacomo Riva	PA	2, 4, 6–7
(Italy) Krypton Motorsport	Porsche 991 GT3 II Cup	322	(Italy) Giovanni Berton	PA	5–8
(Italy) Krypton Motorsport	Porsche 991 GT3 II Cup	372	(Italy) Ivan Costacurta	Am	1, 3, 5
(Italy) Krypton Motorsport	Porsche 991 GT3 II Cup	372	(Italy) Diego Locanto	Am	1–6
(Italy) Krypton Motorsport	Porsche 991 GT3 II Cup	372	(Italy) Alberto Rodio	Am	2, 4, 6
(Italy) Krypton Motorsport	Porsche 991 GT3 II Cup	372	(Italy) Stefano Pezzucchi	Am	2, 4, 6
(Italy) Krypton Motorsport	Porsche 991 GT3 II Cup	389	(Italy) Tazio Pieri	Am	1, 3, 5, 8
(Italy) Krypton Motorsport	Porsche 991 GT3 II Cup	389	(Italy) Daniele Cazzaniga	PA	2, 4, 6–7
(Italy) Krypton Motorsport	Porsche 991 GT3 II Cup	389	(Italy) Davide di Benedetto	PA	2, 4, 6–7
(Italy) Krypton Motorsport	Porsche 991 GT3 II Cup	389	(Italy) Giuseppe Nicolosi	PA	2, 4, 6–7
(Italy) Easy Race	Ferrari 488 Challenge Evo	323	(Italy) Rocco Mazzola	PA	All
(Italy) Easy Race	Ferrari 488 Challenge Evo	323	(Italy) Luigi Coluccio	PA	1–5, 7–8
(Italy) Easy Race	Ferrari 488 Challenge Evo	323	(Italy) Vito Postiglione	PA	4, 6–7
(Denmark) Formula Racing	Ferrari 488 Challenge Evo	327	(Italy) Matteo Cressoni	PA	4
(Denmark) Formula Racing	Ferrari 488 Challenge Evo	327	(Italy) Marco Pulcini	PA	4
(Italy) SR&R	Ferrari 488 Challenge Evo	333	(Italy) Samuele Buttarelli	Am	All
(Italy) SR&R	Ferrari 488 Challenge Evo	333	(Italy) Alessandro Berton	Am	1, 3, 5, 8
(Italy) SR&R	Ferrari 488 Challenge Evo	333	(Italy) Lorenzo Cossu	Am	2, 4, 6–7
(Italy) SR&R	Ferrari 488 Challenge Evo	333	(Italy) Alessio Bacci	Am	2, 4
(Italy) SR&R	Ferrari 488 Challenge Evo	333	(Spain) Fidel Castillo Ruez	Am	6
(Italy) SR&R	Ferrari 488 Challenge Evo	333	(Italy) Manuel Menichini	Am	7
(Italy) SR&R	Ferrari 488 Challenge Evo	369	(Italy) Francesco La Mazza	Am	4, 6–7
(Italy) SR&R	Ferrari 488 Challenge Evo	369	(Italy) Lorenzo Bontempelli	Am	4, 6
(Italy) SR&R	Ferrari 488 Challenge Evo	369	(Italy) Luca Demarchi	Am	4
(Italy) SR&R	Ferrari 488 Challenge Evo	369	(Italy) Jacopo Baratto	Am	6
(Italy) SR&R	Ferrari 488 Challenge Evo	369	(Spain) Fidel Castillo Ruez	Am	7
(Italy) SR&R	Ferrari 488 Challenge Evo	369	(Italy) Alessio Bacci	Am	7
(Italy) SR&R	Ferrari 458 Italia Challenge	334	(Italy) Emilio Gennaro Rocchi	Am	1, 3, 5
(Italy) SR&R	Ferrari 458 Italia Challenge	334	(Italy) Alfredo Salerno	Am	1, 3, 5
(Italy) SR&R	Ferrari 458 Italia Challenge	334	(Italy) "Aramis"	Am	2, 4
(Italy) SR&R	Ferrari 458 Italia Challenge	334	(Italy) Jacopo Baratto	Am	2, 4
(Italy) SR&R	Ferrari 458 Italia Challenge	334	(Italy) Salvatore Pennisi	Am	2, 4
(Italy) RS Racing	Ferrari 488 Challenge Evo	352	(Germany) Axel Sartingen	PA	5
(Italy) RS Racing	Ferrari 488 Challenge Evo	352	(Austria) Alexander Nussbaumer	PA	5
(Italy) Emanuele Romani	Porsche 991 GT3 II Cup	356	(Italy) Emanuele Romani	PA	8
(Italy) Emanuele Romani	Porsche 991 GT3 II Cup	356	(Italy) Gianluca Carboni	PA	8
(San Marino) GDL Racing	Porsche 991 GT3 II Cup	367	(Italy) Roberto Fecchio	Am	8
(Italy) ZRS Motorsport	Porsche 991 GT3 II Cup	390	(Italy) Riccardo De Bellis	Am	8
(Italy) Antonelli Motorsport	Lamborghini Huracán Super Trofeo Evo	391	(Italy) Gianluca Carboni	PA	1, 3
(Italy) Antonelli Motorsport	Lamborghini Huracán Super Trofeo Evo	391	(Italy) Lorenzo Pegoraro	PA	1, 3
(Italy) EF Racing	Porsche 991 GT3 II Cup	396	(Italy) Dario Baruchelli	Am	1, 3, 5
(Italy) EF Racing	Porsche 991 GT3 II Cup	396	(Italy) Pierluigi Alessandri	Am	1, 3, 5
(Italy) EF Racing	Porsche 991 GT3 II Cup	397	(Italy) Emanuele Tabacchi	Am	1, 3, 5, 8
(Italy) EF Racing	Porsche 991 GT3 II Cup	397	(Italy) Gianfranco Bronzini	Am	1, 3, 5
(Italy) EF Racing	Porsche 991 GT3 II Cup	397	(Italy) Dario Baruchelli	Am	8
(Italy) AutOrlando Sport	Porsche 991 GT3 II Cup	398	(Italy) Thomas Pichler	Am	1, 3, 5, 8
(Italy) AutOrlando Sport	Porsche 991 GT3 II Cup	398	(Italy) Giuseppe Ghezzi	Am	1, 5, 8
(Italy) AutOrlando Sport	Porsche 991 GT3 II Cup	398	(Italy) Antonio Mario Macripo	Am	3
Entry Lists:

Icon	Class
P	Pro Cup
PA	Pro-Am Cup
Am	Am Cup

=== GT4 ===
Team	Car	No.	Driver	Class	Rounds
(Italy) Nova Race	Mercedes-AMG GT4	207	(Italy) Alessandro Marchetti	PA	1, 3, 8
(Italy) Nova Race	Mercedes-AMG GT4	207	(Norway) Alexander Schjerpen	PA	1, 3, 5, 8
(Italy) Nova Race	Mercedes-AMG GT4	207	(Italy) Giacomo Parisotto	PA	4
(Italy) Nova Race	Mercedes-AMG GT4	207	(Italy) Fulvio Ferri	PA	4
(Italy) Nova Race	Mercedes-AMG GT4	207	(Italy) Alberto Naska	PA	4
(Italy) Nova Race	Mercedes-AMG GT4	207	(Italy) Diego di Fabio	PA	5
(Italy) Nova Race	Mercedes-AMG GT4	228	(Italy) Filippo Bencivenni	PA	1, 3, 5, 8
(Italy) Nova Race	Mercedes-AMG GT4	228	(Italy) Fulvio Ferri	PA	1, 3, 5, 8
(Italy) AutOrlando Sport	Porsche 718 Cayman GT4 RS Clubsport	274	(Italy) Dario Cerati	PA	1, 3, 5, 8
(Italy) AutOrlando Sport	Porsche 718 Cayman GT4 RS Clubsport	274	(Italy) Maurizio Fondi	PA	1, 3, 8
(Italy) AutOrlando Sport	Porsche 718 Cayman GT4 RS Clubsport	274	(Italy) Paolo Locatelli	PA	5
Entry Lists:

Icon	Class
P	Pro Cup
PA	Pro-Am Cup
Am	Am Cup
