= 2018 Italian GT Championship =

The 2018 Italian GT Championship was the 27th season of the Italian GT Championship, the grand tourer-style sports car racing founded by the Italian automobile club (ACI). The Championship consisted of seven Sprint race events. At each event there were held two races. The Season started on 27 April in Imola and ended on 28 October in Mugello.

== Calendar ==
Round	Circuit	Date
1	(Italy) Autodromo Internazionale Enzo e Dino Ferrari	27-29 April
2	(France) Circuit Paul Ricard	11-13 May
3	(Italy) Misano World Circuit Marco Simoncelli	15-17 June
4	(Italy) Autodromo Internazionale del Mugello	13-15 July
5	(Italy) Autodromo Vallelunga Piero Taruffi	7-9 September
6	(Italy) Autodromo Nazionale di Monza	5-10 October
7	(Italy) Autodromo Internazionale del Mugello	26-28 October

== Teams and Drivers ==
=== GT3 ===
Team	Car	No.	Driver	Rounds
(Italy) Easy Race	Ferrari 488 GT3	3	(Italy) Andrea Fontana	1–6
(Italy) Easy Race	Ferrari 488 GT3	3	(Italy) Daniel Mancinelli	1–6
(San Marino) Audi Sport Italia	Audi R8 LMS	7	(Israel) Bar Baruch	1–7
(San Marino) Audi Sport Italia	Audi R8 LMS	7	(Switzerland) Marcel Fässler	1, 4
(San Marino) Audi Sport Italia	Audi R8 LMS	7	(France) Benoît Tréluyer	2, 7
(San Marino) Audi Sport Italia	Audi R8 LMS	7	(United Kingdom) Jamie Green	3
(San Marino) Audi Sport Italia	Audi R8 LMS	7	(Italy) Mattia Drudi	5–6
(Austria) SVC Sport Management	Lamborghini Huracán GT3	8	(France) Cedric Mezard	2
(Austria) SVC Sport Management	Lamborghini Huracán GT3	8	(France) Steeve Hiesse	2
(Italy) Petri Corse Motorsport	Bentley Continental GT3	8	(Italy) Nicola Larini	4
(Italy) Petri Corse Motorsport	Bentley Continental GT3	8	(Italy) Alessandro Caffi	4
(Italy) Petri Corse Motorsport	Lamborghini Huracán GT3	23	(Italy) Andrea Palma	1–4
(Italy) Petri Corse Motorsport	Lamborghini Huracán GT3	23	(Italy) Giacomo Barri	1–4
(Italy) BMW Padova Team	BMW M6 GT3	15	(Italy) Stefano Comandini	1, 3–7
(Italy) BMW Padova Team	BMW M6 GT3	15	(Italy) Alberto Cerqui	1
(Italy) BMW Padova Team	BMW M6 GT3	15	(Canada) Bruno Spengler	3
(Italy) BMW Padova Team	BMW M6 GT3	15	(Finland) Jesse Krohn	4
(Italy) BMW Padova Team	BMW M6 GT3	15	(Netherlands) Max Koebolt	5–7
(Italy) Imperiale Racing	Lamborghini Huracán GT3	16	(Italy) Vito Postiglione	4–7
(Italy) Imperiale Racing	Lamborghini Huracán GT3	16	(Italy) Giovanni Venturini	4
(Italy) Imperiale Racing	Lamborghini Huracán GT3	16	(France) Frank Perera	5
(Italy) Imperiale Racing	Lamborghini Huracán GT3	16	(Poland) Karol Basz	6–7
(Italy) Imperiale Racing	Lamborghini Huracán GT3	26	(Italy) Mirko Bortolotti	7
(Italy) Imperiale Racing	Lamborghini Huracán GT3	26	(Italy) Raffaele Giammaria	7
(Italy) Imperiale Racing	Lamborghini Huracán GT3	36	(China) Liang Jiatong	4–7
(Italy) Imperiale Racing	Lamborghini Huracán GT3	36	(Italy) Raffaele Giammaria	4–6
(Italy) Imperiale Racing	Lamborghini Huracán GT3	36	(Italy) Marco Mapelli	7
(Italy) Antonelli Motorsport	Lamborghini Huracán GT3	19	(Italy) Lorenzo Veglia	1–7
(Italy) Antonelli Motorsport	Lamborghini Huracán GT3	19	(Denmark) Martin Vedel	1–5
(Italy) Antonelli Motorsport	Lamborghini Huracán GT3	19	(Italy) Loris Spinelli	6–7
(Italy) Antonelli Motorsport	Lamborghini Huracán GT3	63	(Switzerland) Daniel Zampieri	1–7
(Italy) Antonelli Motorsport	Lamborghini Huracán GT3	63	(Italy) Giacomo Altoè	1–7
(Italy) Scuderia Baldini 27	Ferrari 488 GT3	27	(Italy) Stefano Gai	1–7
(Italy) Scuderia Baldini 27	Ferrari 488 GT3	27	(Italy) Giancarlo Fisichella	1–2, 4–7
(Italy) Scuderia Baldini 27	Ferrari 488 GT3	27	(Italy) Michele Rugolo	3
(Italy) Scuderia Baldini 27	Ferrari 488 GT3	72	(Italy) Antonio Fuoco	5
(Italy) Scuderia Baldini 27	Ferrari 488 GT3	72	(Italy) Eddie Cheever III	5
(Italy) Ebimotors	Lamborghini Huracán GT3	44	(Italy) Gianluigi Piccioli	1, 4, 7
(Italy) Ebimotors	Lamborghini Huracán GT3	44	(Italy) Sabino De Castro	1, 4, 7
(Italy) AF Corse	Ferrari 488 GT3	71	(United Kingdom) Chris Froggatt	6
(Italy) AF Corse	Ferrari 488 GT3	71	(United Kingdom) John Sawbridge	6
Entrylists:

=== GT3 Light ===
Team	Car	No.	Driver	Rounds
(Italy) Easy Race	Ferrari 458 Italia GT3	81	(Italy) Marco Magli	1, 3
(Italy) Easy Race	Ferrari 458 Italia GT3	81	(Italy) Matteo Davenia	6
(Italy) Composit Motorsport	Ferrari 458 Italia GT3	82	(Italy) Maurizio Ceresoli	5
(Italy) Composit Motorsport	Ferrari 458 Italia GT3	82	(Japan) Satoshi Tanaka	5
(Italy) AF Corse	Ferrari 458 Italia GT3	91	(United States) Simon Mann	6
(Italy) AF Corse	Ferrari 458 Italia GT3	91	(Italy) Matteo Cressoni	6
(Italy) Nova Race	Audi R8 LMS ultra	98	(Italy) Luca Magnoni	1–3, 6
(Italy) Nova Race	Audi R8 LMS ultra	98	(Italy) Matteo Cressoni	1, 3
(Italy) Nova Race	Audi R8 LMS ultra	98	(Italy) Enrico Garbelli	2
(Italy) Nova Race	Audi R8 LMS ultra	98	(Italy) Alessandro Marchetti	6
Entrylists:

=== Super GT Cup ===
Team	Car	No.	Driver	Rounds
(Italy) Antonelli Motorsport	Lamborghini Huracán Super Trofeo	102	(Italy) Pietro Perolini	1, 3–4, 6–7
(Italy) Antonelli Motorsport	Lamborghini Huracán Super Trofeo	102	(Switzerland) Alain Valente	1, 3–4
(Italy) Antonelli Motorsport	Lamborghini Huracán Super Trofeo	103	(Italy) Marco Cenedese	1, 3–4, 6
(Italy) Antonelli Motorsport	Lamborghini Huracán Super Trofeo	103	(Italy) Alessandro Perullo	1
(Italy) Antonelli Motorsport	Lamborghini Huracán Super Trofeo	103	(Italy) Simone Sartori	3, 7
(Italy) Antonelli Motorsport	Lamborghini Huracán Super Trofeo	103	(Italy) Kikko Galbiati	4, 6
(Italy) Antonelli Motorsport	Lamborghini Huracán Super Trofeo	103	(Italy) Gianni Di Fant	7
(Italy) Antonelli Motorsport	Lamborghini Huracán Super Trofeo	104	(Italy) Pierluigi Alessandri	3
(Italy) Bonaldi Motorsport	Lamborghini Huracán Super Trofeo	132	(China) Xu Xu	6
(Italy) Bonaldi Motorsport	Lamborghini Huracán Super Trofeo	132	(Serbia) Milos Pavlovic	6
Entrylists:

=== GT Cup ===
Team	Car	No.	Driver	Rounds
(Italy) Island Motorsport	Porsche 997 GT3 Cup	163	(Italy) Davide Di Benedetto	1–7
(Italy) Island Motorsport	Porsche 997 GT3 Cup	163	(Italy) Michele Merendino "Apache Jr"	1–3
(Italy) Island Motorsport	Porsche 997 GT3 Cup	163	(Italy) Mimmo Guagliardo	4
(Italy) Island Motorsport	Porsche 997 GT3 Cup	163	(Italy) Vincenzo Sauto	7
(Italy) Island Motorsport	Porsche 991 GT3 Cup	164	(Italy) Michele Merendino	7
(Italy) Island Motorsport	Porsche 991 GT3 Cup	164	(Serbia) Jova Lazarevic	7
(Italy) Ebimotors	Porsche 991 GT3 Cup	169	(Italy) Francesco La Mazza	1, 3–7
(Italy) Ebimotors	Porsche 991 GT3 Cup	169	(Italy) Giuseppe Nicolosi	1, 3–5, 7
(Italy) Ebimotors	Porsche 991 GT3 Cup	169	(Italy) "Linos"	6
(Italy) Pisani Eugenio	Porsche 997 GT3 Cup	176	(Italy) Eugenio Pisani	1–7
(Italy) Pisani Eugenio	Porsche 997 GT3 Cup	176	(Italy) Vincenzo Sauto	1–6
Entrylists:

=== GT4 ===
Team	Car	No.	Driver	Rounds
(Italy) Nova Race	Ginetta G55 GT4	206	(Italy) Luca Magnoni	1–3
(Italy) Nova Race	Ginetta G55 GT4	206	(Italy) Matteo Cressoni	1, 3
(Italy) Nova Race	Ginetta G55 GT4	206	(Italy) Enrico Garbelli	2
(Italy) Nova Race	Ginetta G55 GT4	207	(Italy) Alessandro Marchetti	1–3
(Italy) Nova Race	Ginetta G55 GT4	207	(Finland) Henri Kauppi	1–3
Entrylists:

== Results ==
Overall winner is Bold.

Round		Circuit	Date	GT3	GT3 Light	Super GT Cup	GT Cup	GT4
1	R1	(Italy) Imola	28 April	(Italy) No.27 Scuderia Baldini 27	(Italy) No.81 Easy Race	(Italy) No.102 Antonelli Motorsport	(Italy) No.163 Island Motorsport	(Italy) No.206 Nova Race
1	R1	(Italy) Imola	28 April	(Italy) Stefano Gai (Italy) Giancarlo Fisichella	(Italy) Marco Magli	(Italy) Pietro Perolini (Switzerland) Alain Valente	(Italy) Michele Merendino (Italy) Davide Di Benedetto	(Italy) Luca Magnoni (Italy) Matteo Cressoni
1	R2	(Italy) Imola	29 April	(San Marino) No.7 Audi Sport Italia	(Italy) No.81 Easy Race	(Italy) No.102 Antonelli Motorsport	(Italy) No.163 Island Motorsport	(Italy) No.206 Nova Race
1	R2	(Italy) Imola	29 April	(Israel) Bar Baruch (Switzerland) Marcel Fässler	(Italy) Marco Magli	(Italy) Pietro Perolini (Switzerland) Alain Valente	(Italy) Michele Merendino (Italy) Davide Di Benedetto	(Italy) Luca Magnoni (Italy) Matteo Cressoni
2	R1	(France) Paul Ricard	12 May	(Italy) No.3 Easy Race	(Italy) No.98 Nova Race	No Entries	(Italy) No.176 Pisani Eugenio	(Italy) No.207 Nova Race
2	R1	(France) Paul Ricard	12 May	(Italy) Daniel Mancinelli (Italy) Andrea Fontana	(Italy) Luca Magnoni (Italy) Enrico Garbelli	No Entries	(Italy) Pisani Eugenio (Italy) Vincenzo Sauto	(Italy) Alesandro Marchetti (Finland) Henri Kauppi
2	R2	(France) Paul Ricard	13 May	(Italy) No.23 Petri Corse Motorsport	(Italy) No.98 Nova Race	No Entries	(Italy) No.176 Pisani Eugenio	(Italy) No.206 Nova Race
2	R2	(France) Paul Ricard	13 May	(Italy) Giacomo Barri (Italy) Andrea Palma	(Italy) Luca Magnoni (Italy) Enrico Garbelli	No Entries	(Italy) Eugenio Pisani (Italy) Vincenzo Sauto	(Italy) Luca Magnoni (Italy) Enrico Garbelli
3	R1	(Italy) Misano	16 June	(San Marino) No.7 Audi Sport Italia	(Italy) No.98 Nova Race	(Italy) No.102 Antonelli Motorsport	(Italy) No.163 Island Motorsport	(Italy) No.206 Nova Race
3	R1	(Italy) Misano	16 June	(Israel) Bar Baruch (United Kingdom) Jamie Green	(Italy) Luca Magnoni (Italy) Matteo Cressoni	(Italy) Pietro Perolini (Switzerland) Alain Valente	(Italy) Michele Merendino (Italy) Davide Di Benedetto	(Italy) Luca Magnoni (Italy) Matteo Cressoni
3	R2	(Italy) Misano	17 June	(Italy) No.63 Antonelli Motorsport	(Italy) No.81 Easy Race	(Italy) No.102 Antonelli Motorsport	(Italy) No.163 Island Motorsport	(Italy) No.206 Nova Race
3	R2	(Italy) Misano	17 June	(Switzerland) Daniel Zampieri (Italy) Giacomo Altoè	(Italy) Marco Magli	(Italy) Pietro Perolini (Switzerland) Alain Valente	(Italy) Michele Merendino (Italy) Davide Di Benedetto	(Italy) Luca Magnoni (Italy) Matteo Cressoni
4	R1	(Italy) Mugello	14 July	(Italy) No.15 BMW Padova Team	No Entries	(Italy) No.103 Antonelli Motorsport	(Italy) No.176 Pisani Eugenio	No Entries
4	R1	(Italy) Mugello	14 July	(Italy) Stefano Comandini (Finland) Jesse Krohn	No Entries	(Italy) Marco Cenedese (Italy) Kikko Galbiati	(Italy) Eugenio Pisani (Italy) Vincenzo Sauto	No Entries
4	R2	(Italy) Mugello	15 July	(Italy) No.27 Scuderia Baldini 27	No Entries	(Italy) No.103 Antonelli Motorsport	(Italy) No.176 Pisani Eugenio	No Entries
4	R2	(Italy) Mugello	15 July	(Italy) Stefano Gai (Italy) Giancarlo Fisichella	No Entries	(Italy) Marco Cenedese (Italy) Kikko Galbiati	(Italy) Eugenio Pisani (Italy) Vincenzo Sauto	No Entries
5	R1	(Italy) Vallelunga	8 September	(Italy) No.63 Antonelli Motorsport	(Italy) No.82 Composit Motorsport	No Entries	(Italy) No.163 Island Motorsport	No Entries
5	R1	(Italy) Vallelunga	8 September	(Switzerland) Daniel Zampieri (Italy) Giacomo Altoè	(Italy) Maurizio Ceresoli (Japan) Satoshi Tanaka	No Entries	(Italy) Davide Di Benedetto	No Entries
5	R2	(Italy) Vallelunga	9 September	(Italy) No.27 Scuderia Baldini 27	(Italy) No.82 Composit Motorsport	No Entries	(Italy) No.163 Island Motorsport	No Entries
5	R2	(Italy) Vallelunga	9 September	(Italy) Stefano Gai (Italy) Giancarlo Fisichella	(Italy) Maurizio Ceresoli (Japan) Satoshi Tanaka	No Entries	(Italy) Davide Di Benedetto	No Entries
6	R1	(Italy) Monza	6 October	(San Marino) No.7 Audi Sport Italia	(Italy) No.98 Nova Race	(Italy) No.102 Antonelli Motorsport	(Italy) No.163 Island Motorsport	No Entries
6	R1	(Italy) Monza	6 October	(Israel) Bar Baruch (Italy) Mattia Drudi	(Italy) Luca Magnoni (Italy) Alessandro Marchetti	(Italy) Pietro Perolini	(Italy) Davide Di Benedetto	No Entries
6	R2	(Italy) Monza	7 October	(Italy) No.63 Antonelli Motorsport	(Italy) No.81 Easy Race	(Italy) No.103 Antonelli Motorsport	(Italy) No.163 Island Motorsport	No Entries
6	R2	(Italy) Monza	7 October	(Switzerland) Daniel Zampieri (Italy) Giacomo Altoè	(Italy) Matteo Davenia	(Italy) Marco Cenedese (Italy) Kikko Galbiati	(Italy) Davide Di Benedetto	No Entries
7	R1	(Italy) Mugello	27 October	(Italy) No.27 Scuderia Baldini 27	No Entries	(Italy) No.102 Antonelli Motorsport	(Italy) No.164 Island Motorsport	No Entries
7	R1	(Italy) Mugello	27 October	(Italy) Stefano Gai (Italy) Giancarlo Fisichella	No Entries	(Italy) Pietro Perolini	(Italy) Michele Merendino (Serbia) Jovan Lazarevic	No Entries
7	R2	(Italy) Mugello	28 October	(San Marino) No.7 Audi Sport Italia	No Entries	(Italy) No.102 Antonelli Motorsport	(Italy) No.164 Island Motorsport	No Entries
7	R2	(Italy) Mugello	28 October	(Israel) Bar Baruch (France) Benoît Tréluyer	No Entries	(Italy) Pietro Perolini	(Italy) Michele Merendino (Serbia) Jovan Lazarevic	No Entries
Results:
