= 2024 Italian GT Championship =

Italian Motorsports Championship

The 2024 Italian GT Championship was the 33rd season of the Italian GT Championship, the grand tourer-style sports car racing founded by the Italian Automobile Club (Automobile Club d'Italia). The season started on 4 May at Misano and ended on 27 October at Monza. Similar to the GT World Challenge Europe, the Italian GT Championship was split into two, the Sprint and the Endurance Championships. New for 2024 was the separation of the GT Cup field into two different divisions, Division 1 for Ferrari Challenge and Lamborghini Super Trofeo cars and Division 2 for Porsche Carrera Cup Cars.

The GT3 Sprint Drivers' championship was won by Jens Klingmann for the second year in a row. The GT3 Sprint PRO-AM Division was won by Pedro Carvalho Ebrahim and Federico Malvestiti and the AM Division was won by Glenn McGee and Anthony McIntosh. For the GT Cup Sprint Drivers' championship, the PRO-AM Division 1 was won by Stephane Tribaudini and Ignazio Zanon, the PRO-AM Division 2 was won by Massimo Navatta and Andrea Palma, the AM Division 1 was won by Edoardo Borrelli and Lorenzo Casè, and the AM Division 2 was won by Nicolò Liana and Daniele Polverini.

The GT3 Endurance Drivers' championship was won by Arthur Leclerc, Giancarlo Fisichella, and Tommaso Mosca of Scuderia Baldini, with the latter two winning the championship for two straight years. The announcement of the GT3 Endurance champions was briefly suspended after Vincenzo Sospiri Racing filed a double appeal after the final race held in Monza, which they later withdrew. The GT3 Endurance PRO-AM Division was won by Gilles Stadsbader and the AM Division was won by Leonardo Colavita, Simone Riccitelli, and Christoph Ulrich. For the GT Cup Endurance Drivers' championship, the PRO-AM Division 1 was won by Luca Demarchi, Sabatino Di Mare, and Simone Patrinicola, the PRO-AM Division 2 was won by Giovanni Berton, Ludovico Laurini and Constantino Peroni, the AM Division 1 was won by Douglas Bolger, Alberto Clementi Pisani, and Ferdinando D'Auria which they clinched in the penultimate race, and the AM Division 2 was won by Andrea Buratti and Sandra van der Sloot.

== Calendar ==
Map of circuit locations

Round	Circuit	Date	Series
1	Misano World Circuit Marco Simoncelli, Misano Adriatico, Emilia-Romagna	3–5 May	Sprint
2	Autodromo Internazionale Enzo e Dino Ferrari, Imola, Emilia-Romagna	31 May–2 June	Sprint
3	ACI Vallelunga Circuit, Campagnano di Roma, Rome	14–16 June	Endurance
4	Autodromo Internazionale del Mugello, Mugello, Tuscany	12–14 July	Endurance
5	Autodromo Internazionale del Mugello, Mugello, Tuscany	23–25 August	Sprint
6	Autodromo Internazionale Enzo e Dino Ferrari, Imola, Emilia-Romagna	6–8 September	Endurance
7	Autodromo Nazionale Monza, Monza, Lombardy	4–6 October	Sprint
8	Autodromo Nazionale Monza, Monza, Lombardy	25–27 October	Endurance

== Sprint ==
=== Entry list ===
Team	Car	No.	Drivers	Class	Rounds
GT3
(Italy) Pellin Racing	Ferrari 488 GT3 Evo 2020	3	(United States) Thor Haugen	PA	2
(Italy) Pellin Racing	Ferrari 488 GT3 Evo 2020	3	(Italy) Paolo Ruberti	PA	2
(Italy) Lazarus Corse	Aston Martin Vantage AMR GT3	5	(Finland) William Alatalo	P	All
(Italy) Lazarus Corse	Aston Martin Vantage AMR GT3	5	(Italy) Mattia Di Giusto	P	All
(Italy) BMW Italia Ceccato Racing	BMW M4 GT3	7	(Germany) Jens Klingmann	P	All
(Italy) BMW Italia Ceccato Racing	BMW M4 GT3	7	(Germany) Max Hesse	P	1, 3
(Italy) BMW Italia Ceccato Racing	BMW M4 GT3	7	(United Kingdom) Jake Dennis	P	2
(Italy) BMW Italia Ceccato Racing	BMW M4 GT3	7	(Switzerland) Raffaele Marciello	P	4
(Italy) BMW Italia Ceccato Racing	BMW M4 GT3	8	(Brazil) Pedro Carvalho Ebrahim	PA	All
(Italy) BMW Italia Ceccato Racing	BMW M4 GT3	8	(Italy) Federico Malvestiti	PA	All
(San Marino) Tresor Audi Sport Italia	Audi R8 LMS Evo II	12	(Italy) Pietro Delli Guanti	P	All
(San Marino) Tresor Audi Sport Italia	Audi R8 LMS Evo II	12	(Italy) Rocco Mazzola	P	All
(San Marino) Tresor Audi Sport Italia	Audi R8 LMS Evo II	99	(Italy) Andrea Cola	P	All
(San Marino) Tresor Audi Sport Italia	Audi R8 LMS Evo II	99	(Italy) Leonardo Moncini	P	All
(San Marino) AKM Motorsport	Mercedes-AMG GT3 Evo	16	(Italy) Gustavo Sandrucci	PA	1–2
(San Marino) AKM Motorsport	Mercedes-AMG GT3 Evo	16	(Mexico) Raúl Guzmán	PA	1
(San Marino) AKM Motorsport	Mercedes-AMG GT3 Evo	16	(Germany) Finn Wiebelhaus	PA	2–3
(San Marino) AKM Motorsport	Mercedes-AMG GT3 Evo	16	(Italy) Gianluca Giraudi	PA	3
(San Marino) AKM Motorsport	Mercedes-AMG GT3 Evo	16	(San Marino) Marco Antonelli	PA	4
(San Marino) AKM Motorsport	Mercedes-AMG GT3 Evo	61	(United States) Glenn McGee	Am	All
(San Marino) AKM Motorsport	Mercedes-AMG GT3 Evo	61	(United States) Anthony McIntosh	Am	All
(Italy) EF Racing	Porsche 911 GT3 R (992)	17	(Italy) Enrico Fulgenzi	PA	3–4
(Italy) EF Racing	Porsche 911 GT3 R (992)	17	(Brazil) Marçal Müller	PA	4
(Italy) Vincenzo Sospiri Racing	Lamborghini Huracán GT3 Evo 2	19	(Italy) Riccardo Cazzaniga	P	All
(Italy) Vincenzo Sospiri Racing	Lamborghini Huracán GT3 Evo 2	19	(Italy) Alberto Di Folco	P	1–2
(Italy) Vincenzo Sospiri Racing	Lamborghini Huracán GT3 Evo 2	19	(Italy) Andrea Frassineti	P	3
(Italy) Vincenzo Sospiri Racing	Lamborghini Huracán GT3 Evo 2	63	(Belgium) Baptiste Moulin	PA	All
(Italy) Vincenzo Sospiri Racing	Lamborghini Huracán GT3 Evo 2	63	(Italy) Alessandro Fabi	PA	1–2
(Italy) Vincenzo Sospiri Racing	Lamborghini Huracán GT3 Evo 2	63	(Italy) Ignazio Zanon	PA	3
(Italy) Vincenzo Sospiri Racing	Lamborghini Huracán GT3 Evo 2	63	(Germany) Florian Scholze	PA	4
(Italy) Vincenzo Sospiri Racing	Lamborghini Huracán GT3 Evo 2	66	(Italy) Mattia Michelotto	P	All
(Italy) Vincenzo Sospiri Racing	Lamborghini Huracán GT3 Evo 2	66	(Belgium) Gilles Stadsbader	P	All
(Italy) Easy Race	Ferrari 296 GT3	22	(Italy) Thomas Biagi	P	1
(Italy) Easy Race	Ferrari 296 GT3	22	(Italy) Enzo Trulli	P	1
(Italy) Easy Race	Ferrari 296 GT3	22	(Italy) Lorenzo Bontempelli	PA	2–4
(Italy) Easy Race	Ferrari 296 GT3	22	(Italy) Enzo Trulli	PA	2–4
(Italy) Best Lap	Ferrari 488 GT3 Evo 2020	23	(Italy) Luigi Coluccio	PA	1–2
(Italy) Best Lap	Ferrari 488 GT3 Evo 2020	23	(Italy) Vito Postiglione	PA	1–2
(Italy) Iron Lynx	Lamborghini Huracán GT3 Evo 2	25	(Bulgaria) Stefan Bostandjiev	P	4
(Italy) Iron Lynx	Lamborghini Huracán GT3 Evo 2	25	(Bulgaria) Pavel Lefterov	P	4
(Italy) Nova Race	Honda NSX GT3 Evo22	28	(Italy) Vincenzo Scarpetta	PA	All
(Italy) Nova Race	Honda NSX GT3 Evo22	28	(Italy) Mattia Simonini	PA	All
(Italy) Nova Race	Honda NSX GT3 Evo22	55	(Italy) Filippo Berto	PA	All
(Italy) Nova Race	Honda NSX GT3 Evo22	55	(Italy) Felice Jelmini	PA	All
(Italy) Nova Race	Honda NSX GT3 Evo22	77	(Italy) Massimo Ciglia	Am	All
(Italy) Nova Race	Honda NSX GT3 Evo22	77	(Italy) Luca Magnoni	Am	1–2, 4
(Italy) Nova Race	Honda NSX GT3 Evo22	77	(Italy) Rodolfo Massaro	Am	3
(Italy) Ebimotors	Porsche 911 GT3 R (992)	44	(Italy) Alessandro Baccani	Am	All
(Italy) Ebimotors	Porsche 911 GT3 R (992)	44	(Italy) Paolo Venerosi Pesciolini	Am	All
(Italy) AF Corse	Ferrari 296 GT3	52	(Finland) Luka Nurmi	P	All
(Italy) AF Corse	Ferrari 296 GT3	52	(Switzerland) Jasin Ferati	P	1, 3–4
(Italy) AF Corse	Ferrari 296 GT3	52	(Finland) Konsta Lappalainen	P	2
(Italy) AF Corse	Ferrari 488 GT3 Evo 2020	88	(Italy) Daniele di Amato	P	All
(Italy) AF Corse	Ferrari 488 GT3 Evo 2020	88	Timur Boguslavskiy (Note: Boguslavskiy is Russian, but they compete as neutral competitors as Russian national emblems were banned by the FIA following the Russian invasion of Ukraine.)	P	1–3
(Italy) AF Corse	Ferrari 488 GT3 Evo 2020	88	(Italy) Tommaso Mosca	P	4
(Italy) Imperiale Racing	Lamborghini Huracán GT3 Evo 2	54	(Italy) Giuseppe Fascicolo	PA	All
(Italy) Imperiale Racing	Lamborghini Huracán GT3 Evo 2	54	(Poland) Robin Rogalski	PA	1–3
(Italy) Imperiale Racing	Lamborghini Huracán GT3 Evo 2	54	(Italy) Alessandro Tarabini	PA	4
(Italy) Imperiale Racing	Lamborghini Huracán GT3 Evo 2	85	(United Kingdom) Jack Bartholomew	P	All
(Italy) Imperiale Racing	Lamborghini Huracán GT3 Evo 2	85	(United States) Philippe Denes	P	All
(Italy) Rossocorsa Racing	Ferrari 296 GT3	74	(Italy) Simone Buttarelli	Am	All
(Italy) Rossocorsa Racing	Ferrari 296 GT3	74	(Italy) Stefano Marazzi	Am	All
(Italy) Double TT Racing	Ferrari 488 GT3 Evo 2020	75	(Italy) Leonardo Colavita	PA	All
(Italy) Double TT Racing	Ferrari 488 GT3 Evo 2020	75	(Switzerland) Giorgio Maggi	PA	All
(Japan) JBR	Ferrari 296 GT3	83	(Japan) Kenji Hama	Am	4
(Japan) JBR	Ferrari 296 GT3	83	(Japan) Satoshi Hoshino	Am	4
(Switzerland) Fach Auto Tech	Porsche 911 GT3 R (992)	97	(United States) Dustin Blattner	PA	1
(Switzerland) Fach Auto Tech	Porsche 911 GT3 R (992)	97	(Germany) Dennis Marschall	PA	1
GT Cup (Division 1)
(Italy) Easy Race	Ferrari 488 Challenge Evo	103	(Italy) Diego di Fabio	PA	All
(Italy) Easy Race	Ferrari 488 Challenge Evo	103	(Italy) Emiliano Pierantoni	PA	All
(Italy) Giacomo Race	Lamborghini Huracán Super Trofeo Evo 2	106	(Italy) Giacomo Pollini	PA	All
(Italy) Giacomo Race	Lamborghini Huracán Super Trofeo Evo 2	106	(Italy) Matteo Pollini	PA	All
(Italy) Best Lap	Ferrari 488 Challenge Evo	108	(Italy) Filippo Bencivenni	PA	1
(Italy) Best Lap	Ferrari 488 Challenge Evo	108	(Italy) Gianluca Carboni	PA	1
(Italy) Best Lap	Ferrari 488 Challenge Evo	111	(Italy) Simone Patrinicola	PA	All
(Italy) Best Lap	Ferrari 488 Challenge Evo	111	(Italy) Lorenzo Pegoraro	PA	All
(Italy) Best Lap	Ferrari 488 Challenge Evo	178	(Italy) Mattia Bucci	PA	All
(Italy) Best Lap	Ferrari 488 Challenge Evo	178	(Italy) Filippo Croccolino	PA	All
(Italy) Best Lap	Ferrari 488 Challenge Evo	205	(Italy) Gianluca Carboni	Am	2
(Italy) Best Lap	Ferrari 488 Challenge Evo	205	(Switzerland) Ivan David Mari	Am	2
(Italy) Best Lap	Ferrari 488 Challenge Evo	218	(Switzerland) Giovanni Naldi	Am	All
(Italy) Best Lap	Ferrari 488 Challenge Evo	218	(Italy) Gianlugi Simonelli	Am	All
(Italy) DL Racing	Lamborghini Huracán Super Trofeo Evo 2	109	(Italy) Andrea Fontana	PA	1–2
(Italy) DL Racing	Lamborghini Huracán Super Trofeo Evo 2	109	(Italy) Stefano Gattuso	PA	1
(Italy) DL Racing	Lamborghini Huracán Super Trofeo Evo 2	109	(Italy) Diego Locanto	PA	2
(Italy) DL Racing	Lamborghini Huracán Super Trofeo Evo 2	162	(Egypt) Ibrahim Badawy	PA	All
(Italy) DL Racing	Lamborghini Huracán Super Trofeo Evo 2	172	(Italy) Alessasndro Mainetti	PA	All
(Italy) DL Racing	Lamborghini Huracán Super Trofeo Evo 2	172	(Italy) Federico Scionti	PA	1–2
(Italy) DL Racing	Lamborghini Huracán Super Trofeo Evo 2	172	(Italy) Andrea Fontana	PA	3
(Italy) DL Racing	Lamborghini Huracán Super Trofeo Evo 2	172	(Italy) Luca Segù	PA	4
(Italy) DL Racing	Lamborghini Huracán Super Trofeo Evo 2	272	(Turkey) Vedat Ali Dalokay	Am	All
(Italy) DL Racing	Lamborghini Huracán Super Trofeo Evo 2	272	(Italy) Nicola Tagliapietra	Am	All
(Italy) MM Motorsport	Lamborghini Huracán Super Trofeo Evo 2	121	(Italy) Rosario Messina	PA	All
(Italy) MM Motorsport	Lamborghini Huracán Super Trofeo Evo 2	121	(Italy) Mattia Raffetti	PA	1–2
(Italy) MM Motorsport	Lamborghini Huracán Super Trofeo Evo 2	121	(Argentina) Luciano Martinez	PA	4
(Slovenia) Lema Racing	Lamborghini Huracán Super Trofeo Evo 2	123	(Finland) Elias Niskanen	PA	1–3
(Slovenia) Lema Racing	Lamborghini Huracán Super Trofeo Evo 2	123	(Slovenia) Matej Kosic	PA	2–3
(Slovenia) Lema Racing	Lamborghini Huracán Super Trofeo Evo 2	123	(Slovenia) Andrej Lah	PA	1
(United Kingdom) RS Historics	Lamborghini Huracán Super Trofeo	155	(United Kingdom) Sam Hancock	PA	1–3
(United Kingdom) RS Historics	Lamborghini Huracán Super Trofeo	155	(United Kingdom) Christopher Milner	PA	1–3
(Italy) Vincenzo Sospiri Racing	Lamborghini Huracán Super Trofeo Evo 2	163	(France) Stephane Tribaudini	PA	All
(Italy) Vincenzo Sospiri Racing	Lamborghini Huracán Super Trofeo Evo 2	163	(Italy) Ignazio Zanon	PA	All
(Italy) Double TT Racing	Ferrari 488 Challenge Evo	177	(Belgium) Gilles Renmans	PA	All
(Italy) Double TT Racing	Ferrari 488 Challenge Evo	277	(Italy) Gianmarco Ercoli	Am	2
(Italy) Double TT Racing	Ferrari 488 Challenge Evo	277	(Italy) Mark Adrian Locke	Am	2
(Germany) Mertel Motorsport	Ferrari 488 Challenge Evo	180	(Italy) Tommaso Lovati	PA	All
(Germany) Mertel Motorsport	Ferrari 488 Challenge Evo	180	(Italy) Mauro Trentin	PA	1–2
(Germany) Mertel Motorsport	Ferrari 488 Challenge Evo	180	(Italy) Federico Scionti	PA	3
(Germany) Mertel Motorsport	Ferrari 488 Challenge Evo	180	(United Kingdom) Steven Liquorish	PA	4
(Germany) Mertel Motorsport	Ferrari 488 Challenge Evo	281	(Italy) Michele La Marca	Am	1–2
(Germany) Mertel Motorsport	Ferrari 488 Challenge Evo	281	(Italy) Marco Verzelli	Am	1–2
(Italy) CRM Motorsport	Lamborghini Huracán Super Trofeo Evo 2	185	(Italy) Matteo Desideri	PA	1
(Italy) CRM Motorsport	Lamborghini Huracán Super Trofeo Evo 2	249	(Italy) Ettore Carminati	Am	All
(Italy) CRM Motorsport	Lamborghini Huracán Super Trofeo Evo 2	249	(Italy) Bernardo Pellegrini	Am	All
(Italy) Target Racing	Lamborghini Huracán Super Trofeo Evo 2	196	(Denmark) Largim Ali	PA	2
(Italy) Target Racing	Lamborghini Huracán Super Trofeo Evo 2	196	(Italy) Raffaele Giannoni	PA	2
(Italy) Target Racing	Lamborghini Huracán Super Trofeo Evo 2	239	(China) Huilin Han	Am	2
(Italy) Scuderia Villorba Corse	Lamborghini Huracán Super Trofeo Evo 2	201	(San Marino) Luciano Privitello	Am	2, 4
(Italy) HC Racing Division	Lamborghini Huracán Super Trofeo Evo 2	202	(Italy) Ferdinando D'Auria	Am	All
(Italy) HC Racing Division	Lamborghini Huracán Super Trofeo Evo 2	202	(Italy) Gaetano Oliva	Am	1–2, 4
(Italy) HC Racing Division	Lamborghini Huracán Super Trofeo Evo 2	288	(Italy) Alberto Clementi Pisani	Am	All
(Italy) HC Racing Division	Lamborghini Huracán Super Trofeo Evo 2	288	(Italy) Piero Randazzo	Am	All
(Italy) Invictus Corse	Lamborghini Huracán GT3 Evo 2	207	(Italy) Edoardo Barbolini	Am	4
(Italy) Invictus Corse	Lamborghini Huracán GT3 Evo 2	207	(Italy) Giuseppe Forenzi	Am	4
(Italy) Pinetti Motorsport	Ferrari 488 Challenge Evo	229	(Italy) Giovanni Stefanini	Am	1–2, 4
(Italy) Pinetti Motorsport	Ferrari 488 Challenge Evo	229	(Italy) Simone Vullo	Am	1
(Italy) Pinetti Motorsport	Ferrari 488 Challenge Evo	280	(Italy) Emma Segattini	Am	1–3
(Italy) Pinetti Motorsport	Ferrari 488 Challenge Evo	280	(Italy) Victor Briselli	Am	1–2, 4
(Italy) Pinetti Motorsport	Ferrari 488 Challenge Evo	280	(Italy) Adriano Bernazzani	Am	3
(Italy) Pinetti Motorsport	Ferrari 488 Challenge Evo	280	(Italy) Riccardo Tucci	Am	4
(Italy) AF Corse	Ferrari 488 Challenge Evo	250	(Italy) Edoardo Borrelli	Am	All
(Italy) AF Corse	Ferrari 488 Challenge Evo	250	(Monaco) Lorenzo Casè	Am	All
GT Cup (Division 2)
(Italy) EF Racing	Porsche 992 GT3 Cup	117	(Italy) William Mezzetti	PA	4
(Italy) SP Racing	Porsche 992 GT3 Cup	133	(Italy) Eugenio Pisani	PA	All
(Italy) SP Racing	Porsche 992 GT3 Cup	133	(Italy) Stefano Zerbi	PA	All
(Italy) SP Racing	Porsche 991 GT3 II Cup	145	(Guatemala) Ian Rodríguez	PA	3–4
(Italy) SP Racing	Porsche 991 GT3 II Cup	145	(Netherlands) Laura van den Hengel	PA	3
(Italy) SP Racing	Porsche 991 GT3 II Cup	145	(Argentina) Fran Viel Bugliotti	PA	4
(Italy) SP Racing	Porsche 991 GT3 II Cup	223	(Italy) Fabio Fabiani	Am	All
(Italy) SP Racing	Porsche 991 GT3 II Cup	223	(Italy) Stefano Zanini	Am	All
(Italy) SP Racing	Porsche 991 GT3 II Cup	233	(Italy) Massimo Abbati	Am	1–3
(Italy) SP Racing	Porsche 991 GT3 II Cup	233	(Italy) Alberto Grisi	Am	1–3
(Italy) Raptor Engineering	Porsche 992 GT3 Cup	169	(Italy) Massimo Navatta	PA	All
(Italy) Raptor Engineering	Porsche 992 GT3 Cup	169	(Italy) Andrea Palma	PA	All
(Belgium) Speed Lover	Porsche 992 GT3 Cup	210	(Belgium) Willem Meulders	Am	4
(Belgium) Speed Lover	Porsche 992 GT3 Cup	210	(Belgium) Rik Renmans	Am	4
(Italy) EF Racing	Porsche 992 GT3 Cup	217	(Italy) Corrado Costa	Am	4
(Italy) EF Racing	Porsche 992 GT3 Cup	217	(Netherlands) Sandra van der Sloot	Am	4
(Switzerland) Centri Porsche Ticino	Porsche 992 GT3 Cup	291	(Switzerland) Ivan Martin Jacoma	Am	1, 3–4
(Switzerland) Centri Porsche Ticino	Porsche 992 GT3 Cup	291	(Slovenia) Matej Knez	Am	1
(Switzerland) Centri Porsche Ticino	Porsche 992 GT3 Cup	291	(Italy) Valerio Presezzi	Am	3
(Italy) ZRS Motorsport	Porsche 992 GT3 Cup	224	(Italy) Nicolò Liana	Am	All
(Italy) ZRS Motorsport	Porsche 992 GT3 Cup	224	(Italy) Daniele Polverini	Am	All

Icon	Class
**P**	Pro Cup
**PA**	Pro-Am Cup
**Am**	Am Cup

=== Results and standings ===
Bold indicates the overall winners.

==== GT3 ====
Round		Circuit	Date	Pole position	Pro Winners	Pro-Am Winners	Am Winners
1	R1	(Italy) Misano World Circuit Marco Simoncelli	4 May	(Italy) No. 66 Vincenzo Sospiri Racing	**(Italy) No. 66 Vincenzo Sospiri Racing**	(Switzerland) No. 97 Fach Auto Tech	(San Marino) No. 61 AKM Motorsport
1	R1	(Italy) Misano World Circuit Marco Simoncelli	4 May	(Italy) Mattia Michelotto (Belgium) Gilles Stadsbader	**(Italy) Mattia Michelotto** **(Belgium) Gilles Stadsbader**	(United States) Dustin Blattner (Germany) Dennis Marschall	(United States) Glenn McGee (United States) Anthony McIntosh
1	R2	(Italy) Misano World Circuit Marco Simoncelli	5 May	(Italy) No. 85 Imperiale Racing	**(Italy) No. 7 BMW Italia Ceccato Racing**	(Italy) No. 8 BMW Italia Ceccato Racing	(San Marino) No. 61 AKM Motorsport
1	R2	(Italy) Misano World Circuit Marco Simoncelli	5 May	(United Kingdom) Jack Bartholomew (United States) Philippe Denes	**(Germany) Max Hesse** **(Germany) Jens Klingmann**	(Brazil) Pedro Carvalho Ebrahim (Italy) Federico Malvestiti	(United States) Glenn McGee (United States) Anthony McIntosh
2	R1	(Italy) Autodromo Internazionale Enzo e Dino Ferrari	1 June	(Italy) No. 85 Imperiale Racing	**(Italy) No. 66 Vincenzo Sospiri Racing**	(San Marino) No. 16 AKM Motorsport	(San Marino) No. 61 AKM Motorsport
2	R1	(Italy) Autodromo Internazionale Enzo e Dino Ferrari	1 June	(United Kingdom) Jack Bartholomew (United States) Philippe Denes	**(Italy) Mattia Michelotto** **(Belgium) Gilles Stadsbader**	(Italy) Gustavo Sandrucci (Germany) Finn Wiebelhaus	(United States) Glenn McGee (United States) Anthony McIntosh
2	R2	(Italy) Autodromo Internazionale Enzo e Dino Ferrari	2 June	(Italy) No. 85 Imperiale Racing	**(Italy) No. 85 Imperiale Racing**	(Italy) No. 8 BMW Italia Ceccato Racing	(San Marino) No. 61 AKM Motorsport
2	R2	(Italy) Autodromo Internazionale Enzo e Dino Ferrari	2 June	(United Kingdom) Jack Bartholomew (United States) Philippe Denes	**(United Kingdom) Jack Bartholomew** **(United States) Philippe Denes**	(Brazil) Pedro Carvalho Ebrahim (Italy) Federico Malvestiti	(United States) Glenn McGee (United States) Anthony McIntosh
3	R1	(Italy) Autodromo Internazionale del Mugello	24 August	(Italy) No. 52 AF Corse	**(Italy) No. 7 BMW Italia Ceccato Racing**	(Italy) No. 55 Nova Race	(Italy) No. 77 Nova Race
3	R1	(Italy) Autodromo Internazionale del Mugello	24 August	(Finland) Luka Nurmi (Finland) Konsta Lappalainen	**(Germany) Max Hesse** **(Germany) Jens Klingmann**	(Italy) Filippo Berto (Italy) Felice Jelmini	(Italy) Massimo Ciglia (Italy) Rodolfo Massaro
3	R2	(Italy) Autodromo Internazionale del Mugello	25 August	(Italy) No. 7 BMW Italia Ceccato Racing	**(San Marino) No. 12 Tresor Audi Sport Italia**	(Italy) No. 8 BMW Italia Ceccato Racing	(Italy) No. 77 Nova Race
3	R2	(Italy) Autodromo Internazionale del Mugello	25 August	(Germany) Max Hesse (Germany) Jens Klingmann	**(Italy) Pietro Delli Guanti** **(Italy) Rocco Mazzola**	(Brazil) Pedro Carvalho Ebrahim (Italy) Federico Malvestiti	(Italy) Massimo Ciglia (Italy) Rodolfo Massaro
4	R1	(Italy) Autodromo Nazionale Monza	5 October	(Italy) No. 7 BMW Italia Ceccato Racing	**(Italy) No. 7 BMW Italia Ceccato Racing**	(Italy) No. 8 BMW Italia Ceccato Racing	(San Marino) No. 16 AKM Motorsport
4	R1	(Italy) Autodromo Nazionale Monza	5 October	(Germany) Jens Klingmann (Switzerland) Raffaele Marciello	**(Germany) Jens Klingmann** **(Switzerland) Raffaele Marciello**	(Brazil) Pedro Carvalho Ebrahim (Italy) Federico Malvestiti	(San Marino) Marco Antonelli
4	R2	(Italy) Autodromo Nazionale Monza	6 October	(Italy) No. 7 BMW Italia Ceccato Racing	**(Italy) No. 7 BMW Italia Ceccato Racing**	(Italy) No. 8 BMW Italia Ceccato Racing	(San Marino) No. 61 AKM Motorsport
4	R2	(Italy) Autodromo Nazionale Monza	6 October	(Germany) Jens Klingmann (Switzerland) Raffaele Marciello	**(Germany) Jens Klingmann** **(Switzerland) Raffaele Marciello**	(Brazil) Pedro Carvalho Ebrahim (Italy) Federico Malvestiti	(United States) Glenn McGee (United States) Anthony McIntosh

==== GT Cup ====
Round		Circuit	Date	Pole position	Div. 1 Pro-Am Winners	Div. 1 Am Winners	Div. 2 Pro-Am Winners	Div. 2 Am Winners
1	R1	(Italy) Misano World Circuit Marco Simoncelli	4 May	(Italy) No. 103 Easy Race	(Italy) No. 106 Giacomo Race	(Italy) No. 202 HC Racing Division	(Italy) No. 169 Raptor Engineering	(Italy) No. 224 ZRS Motorsport
1	R1	(Italy) Misano World Circuit Marco Simoncelli	4 May	(Italy) Diego di Fabio (Italy) Emiliano Pierantoni	(Italy) Giacomo Pollini (Italy) Matteo Pollini	(Italy) Ferdinando D'Auria (Italy) Gaetano Oliva	(Italy) Massimo Navatta (Italy) Andrea Palma	(Italy) Daniele Polverini (Italy) Nicolò Liana
1	R2	(Italy) Misano World Circuit Marco Simoncelli	5 May	(Italy) No. 163 Vincenzo Sospiri Racing	(Italy) No. 163 Vincenzo Sospiri Racing	(Italy) No. 288 HC Racing Division	(Italy) No. 169 Raptor Engineering	(Italy) No. 224 ZRS Motorsport
1	R2	(Italy) Misano World Circuit Marco Simoncelli	5 May	(France) Stephane Tribaudini (Italy) Ignazio Zanon	(France) Stephane Tribaudini (Italy) Ignazio Zanon	(Italy) Alberto Clementi Pisani (Italy) Piero Randazzo	(Italy) Massimo Navatta (Italy) Andrea Palma	(Italy) Daniele Polverini (Italy) Nicolò Liana
2	R1	(Italy) Autodromo Internazionale Enzo e Dino Ferrari	1 June	(Italy) No. 111 Best Lap	(Italy) No. 106 Giacomo Race	(Italy) No. 250 AF Corse	(Italy) No. 133 SP Racing	(Italy) No. 224 ZRS Motorsport
2	R1	(Italy) Autodromo Internazionale Enzo e Dino Ferrari	1 June	(Italy) Simone Patrinicola (Italy) Lorenzo Pegoraro	(Italy) Giacomo Pollini (Italy) Matteo Pollini	(Italy) Edoardo Borrelli (Monaco) Lorenzo Casè	(Italy) Eugenio Pisani (Italy) Stefano Zerbi	(Italy) Daniele Polverini (Italy) Nicolò Liana
2	R2	(Italy) Autodromo Internazionale Enzo e Dino Ferrari	2 June	(United Kingdom) No. 155 RS Historics	(Italy) No. 111 Best Lap	(Italy) No. 249 CRM Motorsport	(Italy) No. 169 Raptor Engineering	(Italy) No. 224 ZRS Motorsport
2	R2	(Italy) Autodromo Internazionale Enzo e Dino Ferrari	2 June	(United Kingdom) Sam Hancock (United Kingdom) Christopher Milner	(Italy) Simone Patrinicola (Italy) Lorenzo Pegoraro	(Italy) Ettore Carminati (Italy) Bernardo Pellegrini	(Italy) Massimo Navatta (Italy) Andrea Palma	(Italy) Daniele Polverini (Italy) Nicolò Liana
3	R1	(Italy) Autodromo Internazionale del Mugello	24 August	(Italy) No. 106 Giacomo Race	(Italy) No. 163 Vincenzo Sospiri Racing	(Italy) No. 250 AF Corse	(Italy) No. 169 Raptor Engineering	(Switzerland) No. 291 Centri Porsche Ticino
3	R1	(Italy) Autodromo Internazionale del Mugello	24 August	(Italy) Giacomo Pollini (Italy) Matteo Pollini	(France) Stephane Tribaudini (Italy) Ignazio Zanon	(Italy) Edoardo Borrelli (Monaco) Lorenzo Casè	(Italy) Massimo Navatta (Italy) Andrea Palma	(Switzerland) Ivan Martin Jacoma (Italy) Valerio Presezzi
3	R2	(Italy) Autodromo Internazionale del Mugello	25 August	(Italy) No. 163 Vincenzo Sospiri Racing	(Italy) No. 162 DL Racing	(Italy) No. 288 HC Racing Division	(Italy) No. 169 Raptor Engineering	(Switzerland) No. 291 Centri Porsche Ticino
3	R2	(Italy) Autodromo Internazionale del Mugello	25 August	(France) Stephane Tribaudini (Italy) Ignazio Zanon	(Egypt) Ibrahim Badawy	(Italy) Alberto Clementi Pisani (Italy) Piero Randazzo	(Italy) Massimo Navatta (Italy) Andrea Palma	(Switzerland) Ivan Martin Jacoma (Italy) Valerio Presezzi
4	R1	(Italy) Autodromo Nazionale Monza	5 October	(Italy) No. 103 Easy Race	(Italy) No. 103 Easy Race	(Italy) No. 250 AF Corse	(Italy) No. 133 SP Racing	(Italy) No. 223 SP Racing
4	R1	(Italy) Autodromo Nazionale Monza	5 October	(Italy) Diego di Fabio (Italy) Emiliano Pierantoni	(Italy) Diego di Fabio (Italy) Emiliano Pierantoni	(Italy) Edoardo Borrelli (Monaco) Lorenzo Casè	(Italy) Eugenio Pisani (Italy) Stefano Zerbi	(Italy) Fabio Fabiani (Italy) Stefano Zanini
4	R2	(Italy) Autodromo Nazionale Monza	6 October	(Italy) No. 111 Best Lap	(Italy) No. 111 Best Lap	(Italy) No. 207 Invictus Corse	(Italy) No. 169 Raptor Engineering	(Switzerland) No. 291 Centri Porsche Ticino
4	R2	(Italy) Autodromo Nazionale Monza	6 October	(Italy) Simone Patrinicola (Italy) Lorenzo Pegoraro	(Italy) Simone Patrinicola (Italy) Lorenzo Pegoraro	(Italy) Edoardo Barbolini (Italy) Giuseppe Forenzi	(Italy) Massimo Navatta (Italy) Andrea Palma	(Switzerland) Ivan Martin Jacoma

=== Drivers' championships ===
==== Scoring system ====
Position	**1st**	**2nd**	**3rd**	**4th**	**5th**	**6th**	**7th**	**8th**	**9th**	**10th**	**Pole**	**FL**
Points	20	15	12	10	8	6	4	3	2	1	1	1

==== GT3 ====
===== Sprint Drivers' Championship =====
Pos.	Driver	Team	MIS (Italy)		IMO (Italy)		MUG (Italy)		MNZ (Italy)		Points
Pos.	Driver	Team	R1	R2	R1	R2	R1	R2	R1	R2	Points
1	(Germany) Jens Klingmann	(Italy) BMW Italia Ceccato Racing	19	1	17	2	1	**2**	**1**	**1**	116
2	(Italy) Pietro Delli Guanti	(San Marino) Tresor Audi Sport Italia	4	2	6	4	3	1	Ret	5	81
2	(Italy) Rocco Mazzola	(San Marino) Tresor Audi Sport Italia	4	2	6	4	3	1	Ret	5	81
3	(Italy) Mattia Michelotto	(Italy) Vincenzo Sospiri Racing	**1**	5	1	15	DNS	5	2	8	76
3	(Belgium) Gilles Stadsbader	(Italy) Vincenzo Sospiri Racing	**1**	5	1	15	DNS	5	2	8	76
4	(Italy) Riccardo Cazzaniga	(Italy) Vincenzo Sospiri Racing	3	4	3	14	7	4	17	2	63
5	(United Kingdom) Jack Bartholomew	(Italy) Imperiale Racing	5	**11**	**EX**	**1**	9	7	3	7	55
5	(United States) Philippe Denes	(Italy) Imperiale Racing	5	**11**	**EX**	**1**	9	7	3	7	55
6	(Brazil) Pedro Carvalho Ebrahim	(Italy) BMW Italia Ceccato Racing	10	7	7	5	6	6	5	3	49
6	(Italy) Federico Malvestiti	(Italy) BMW Italia Ceccato Racing	10	7	7	5	6	6	5	3	49
7	(Italy) Daniele Di Amato	(Italy) AF Corse	2	6	11	6	Ret	Ret	6	6	39
8	(Finland) Luka Nurmi	(Italy) AF Corse	13	3	19	3	**16**	3	Ret	11	38
9	(Italy) Andrea Cola	(San Marino) Tresor Audi Sport Italia	7	Ret	2	12	2	11	14	Ret	34
9	(Italy) Leonardo Moncini	(San Marino) Tresor Audi Sport Italia	7	Ret	2	12	2	11	14	Ret	34
10	Timur Boguslavskiy	(Italy) AF Corse	2	6	11	6	Ret	Ret			27
11	(Italy) Filippo Berto	(Italy) Nova Race	Ret	9	8	8	4	8	7	9	27
11	(Italy) Felice Jelmini	(Italy) Nova Race	Ret	9	8	8	4	8	7	9	27
12	(Switzerland) Jasin Ferati	(Italy) AF Corse	13	3			**16**	3	Ret	11	26
13	(Belgium) Baptiste Moulin	(Italy) Vincenzo Sospiri Racing	8	8	18	7	8	9	Ret	22	15
14	(Italy) Enzo Trulli	(Italy) Easy Race	12	22	5	9	DNS		Ret	13	13
15	(Finland) William Alatalo	(Italy) Lazarus Corse	18	12	10	10	5	16	9	10	13
15	(Italy) Mattia Di Giusto	(Italy) Lazarus Corse	18	12	10	10	5	16	9	10	13
16	(Italy) Vincenzo Scarpetta	(Italy) Nova Race	20	16	12	16			8	Ret	3
16	(Italy) Mattia Simonini	(Italy) Nova Race	20	16	12	16			8	Ret	3
17	(Italy) Giuseppe Fascicolo	(Italy) Imperiale Racing	16	17	16	17	13	10	Ret	20	1
18	(Poland) Robin Rogalski	(Italy) Imperiale Racing	16	17	16	17	13	10			1
19	(United States) Glenn McGee	(San Marino) AKM Motorsport	14	15	14	11	15	Ret	18	14	0
19	(United States) Anthony McIntosh	(San Marino) AKM Motorsport	14	15	14	11	15	Ret	18	14	0
20	(Italy) Leonardo Colavita	(Italy) Double TT Racing	17	13	13	19	12	12	11	18	0
20	(Switzerland) Giorgio Maggi	(Italy) Double TT Racing	17	13	13	19	12	12	11	18	0
21	(Italy) Massimo Ciglia	(Italy) Nova Race	15	19	15	18	11	14	12	17	0
22	(Italy) Alessandro Baccani	(Italy) Ebimotors	22	20	20	20	14	15	13	21	0
22	(Italy) Paolo Venerosi Pesciolini	(Italy) Ebimotors	22	20	20	20	14	15	13	21	0
23	(Italy) Luca Magnoni	(Italy) Nova Race	15	19	15	18			12	17	0
24	(Italy) Simone Buttarelli	(Italy) Rossocorsa Racing	21	21	Ret	Ret	DNS		16	15	0
24	(Italy) Stefano Marazzi	(Italy) Rossocorsa Racing	21	21	Ret	Ret	DNS		16	15	0
Not classified (Note: Under Article 26 of the Sprint Regulations, in order to participate in the final rankings of the Championship, each driver must have carried out at least three events.)
—N/a	(Germany) Max Hesse	(Italy) BMW Italia Ceccato Racing	19	1			1	**2**			57
—N/a	(Switzerland) Raffaele Marciello	(Italy) BMW Italia Ceccato Racing							**1**	**1**	44
—N/a	(Italy) Alberto Di Folco	(Italy) Vincenzo Sospiri Racing	3	4	3	14					34
—N/a	(United Kingdom) Jake Dennis	(Italy) BMW Italia Ceccato Racing			17	2					15
—N/a	(Italy) Alex Frassineti	(Italy) Vincenzo Sospiri Racing							17	2	15
—N/a	(Italy) Andrea Frassineti	(Italy) Vincenzo Sospiri Racing					7	4			14
—N/a	(Italy) Lorenzo Bontempelli	(Italy) Easy Race			5	9	DNS		Ret	13	13
—N/a	(Finland) Konsta Lappalainen	(Italy) AF Corse			19	3					12
—N/a	(Italy) Tommaso Mosca	(Italy) AF Corse							6	6	12
—N/a	(Germany) Finn Wiebelhaus	(San Marino) AKM Motorsport			4	21	10	Ret			11
—N/a	(Italy) Gustavo Sandrucci	(San Marino) AKM Motorsport	11	18	4	21					10
—N/a	(Italy) Enrico Fulgenzi	(Italy) EF Racing					Ret	Ret	4	12	10
—N/a	(Brazil) Marçal Müller	(Italy) EF Racing							4	12	10
—N/a	(Bulgaria) Stefan Bostandjiev	(Italy) Iron Lynx							Ret	4	10
—N/a	(Bulgaria) Pavel Lefterov	(Italy) Iron Lynx							Ret	4	10
—N/a	(Italy) Alessandro Fabi	(Italy) Vincenzo Sospiri Racing	8	8	18	7					10
—N/a	(United States) Dustin Blattner	(Switzerland) Fach Auto Tech	6	10							7
—N/a	(Germany) Dennis Marschall	(Switzerland) Fach Auto Tech	6	10							7
—N/a	(Italy) Ignazio Zanon	(Italy) Vincenzo Sospiri Racing					8	9			5
—N/a	(Italy) Luigi Coluccio	(Italy) Best Lap	9	14	9	13					4
—N/a	(Italy) Vito Postiglione	(Italy) Best Lap	9	14	9	13					4
—N/a	(San Marino) Marco Antonelli	(San Marino) AKM Motorsport							10	16	1
—N/a	(Italy) Gianluca Giraudi	(San Marino) AKM Motorsport					10	Ret			1
—N/a	(Italy) Rodolfo Massaro	(Italy) Nova Race					11	14			0
—N/a	(Mexico) Raúl Guzmán	(San Marino) AKM Motorsport	11	18							0
—N/a	(Italy) Thomas Biagi	(Italy) Easy Race	12	22							0
—N/a	(Japan) Kenji Hama	(Japan) JBR							15	19	0
—N/a	(Japan) Satoshi Hoshino	(Japan) JBR							15	19	0
—N/a	(Italy) Alessandro Tarabini	(Italy) Imperiale Racing							Ret	20	0
—N/a	(United States) Thor Haugen	(Italy) Pellin Racing			21	22					0
—N/a	(Italy) Paolo Ruberti	(Italy) Pellin Racing			21	22					0
—N/a	(Germany) Florian Scholze	(Italy) Vincenzo Sospiri Racing							Ret	22	0
Pos.	Driver	Team	R1	R2	R1	R2	R1	R2	R1	R2	Points
Pos.	Driver	Team	MIS (Italy)		IMO (Italy)		MUG (Italy)		MNZ (Italy)		Points

Colour	Result
Gold	Winner
Silver	Second place
Bronze	Third place
Green	Points classification
Blue	Non-points classification
Blue	Non-classified finish (NC)
Purple	Retired, not classified (Ret)
Red	Did not qualify (DNQ)
Red	Did not pre-qualify (DNPQ)
Black	Disqualified (DSQ)
White	Did not start (DNS)
White	Withdrew (WD)
White	Race cancelled (C)
Blank	Did not practice (DNP)
Blank	Did not arrive (DNA)
Blank	Excluded (EX)

**Bold** - Pole position/fastest qualifying time
Italics - Fastest lap

===== Pro-Am Drivers' Championship =====
Pos.	Driver	Team	MIS (Italy)		IMO (Italy)		MUG (Italy)		MNZ (Italy)		Points
Pos.	Driver	Team	R1	R2	R1	R2	R1	R2	R1	R2	Points
1	(Brazil) Pedro Carvalho Ebrahim	(Italy) BMW Italia Ceccato Racing	4	**1**	**3**	**1**	3	1	1	1	129
1	(Italy) Federico Malvestiti	(Italy) BMW Italia Ceccato Racing	4	**1**	**3**	**1**	3	1	1	1	129
2	(Italy) Filippo Berto	(Italy) Nova Race	Ret	3	4	3	**1**	2	**2**	2	102
2	(Italy) Felice Jelmini	(Italy) Nova Race	Ret	3	4	3	**1**	2	**2**	2	102
3	(Belgium) Baptiste Moulin	(Italy) Vincenzo Sospiri Racing	2	2	10	2	4	3	Ret	4	76
4	(Finland) William Alatalo	(Italy) Lazarus Corse	8	5	6	5	2	7	4	**3**	64
4	(Italy) Mattia Di Giusto	(Italy) Lazarus Corse	8	5	6	5	2	7	4	**3**	64
5	(Italy) Leonardo Colavita	(Italy) Double TT Racing	7	6	8	9	6	5	5	5	43
5	(Switzerland) Giorgio Maggi	(Italy) Double TT Racing	7	6	8	9	6	5	5	5	43
6	(Italy) Lorenzo Bontempelli	(Italy) Best Lap			2	4	**DNS**		Ret	4	38
6	(Italy) Enzo Trulli	(Italy) Best Lap			2	4	**DNS**		Ret	4	38
7	(Italy) Vincenzo Scarpetta	(Italy) Nova Race	9	8	7	7	8	6	3	Ret	34
7	(Italy) Mattia Simonini	(Italy) Nova Race	9	8	7	7	8	6	3	Ret	34
8	(Italy) Giuseppe Fascicolo	(Italy) Imperiale Racing	6	9	9	8	7	4			27
8	(Poland) Robin Rogalski	(Italy) Imperiale Racing	6	9	9	8	7	4			27
Not classified
—N/a	(Italy) Alessandro Fabi	(Italy) Vincenzo Sospiri Racing	2	2	10	2					47
—N/a	(United States) Dustin Blattner	(Switzerland) Fach Auto Tech	**1**	4							32
—N/a	(Germany) Dennis Marschall	(Switzerland) Fach Auto Tech	**1**	4							32
—N/a	(Italy) Gustavo Sandrucci	(San Marino) AKM Motorsport	5	10	1	10					30
—N/a	(Italy) Luigi Coluccio	(Italy) Best Lap	3	7	5	6					30
—N/a	(Italy) Vito Postiglione	(Italy) Best Lap	3	7	5	6					30
—N/a	(Germany) Finn Wiebelhaus	(San Marino) AKM Motorsport			1	10	5	Ret			29
—N/a	(Italy) Ignazio Zanon	(Italy) Vincenzo Sospiri Racing					4	3			22
—N/a	(Germany) Florian Scholze	(Italy) Vincenzo Sospiri Racing							Ret	4	10
—N/a	(Mexico) Raúl Guzmán	(San Marino) AKM Motorsport	5	10							9
—N/a	(Italy) Gianluca Giraudi	(San Marino) AKM Motorsport					5	Ret			8
—N/a	(United States) Thor Haugen	(Italy) Pellin Racing			11	11					0
—N/a	(Italy) Paolo Ruberti	(Italy) Pellin Racing			11	11					0
Pos.	Driver	Team	R1	R2	R1	R2	R1	R2	R1	R2	Points
Pos.	Driver	Team	MIS (Italy)		IMO (Italy)		MUG (Italy)		MNZ (Italy)		Points

===== Am Drivers' Championship =====
Pos.	Driver	Team	MIS (Italy)		IMO (Italy)		MUG (Italy)		MNZ (Italy)		Points
Pos.	Driver	Team	R1	R2	R1	R2	R1	R2	R1	R2	Points
1	(United States) Glenn McGee	(San Marino) AKM Motorsport	**1**	1	**1**	1	2	**Ret**	6	1	122
1	(United States) Anthony McIntosh	(San Marino) AKM Motorsport	**1**	1	**1**	1	2	**Ret**	6	1	122
2	(Italy) Massimo Ciglia	(Italy) Nova Race	2	2	2	2	**1**	1	2	4	118
3	(Italy) Alessandro Baccani	(Italy) Ebimotors	4	3	3	3	3	3	3	7	89
3	(Italy) Paolo Venerosi Pesciolini	(Italy) Ebimotors	4	3	3	3	3	3	3	7	89
4	(Italy) Luca Magnoni	(Italy) Nova Race	2	2	2	2			2	4	88
5	(Italy) Simone Buttarelli	(Italy) Rossocorsa Racing	3	**4**	Ret	**Ret**	**DNS**		**5**	2	51
5	(Italy) Stefano Marazzi	(Italy) Rossocorsa Racing	3	**4**	Ret	**Ret**	**DNS**		**5**	2	51
Not classified
—N/a	(Italy) Rodolfo Massaro	(Italy) Nova Race					**1**	1			41
—N/a	(San Marino) Marco Antonelli	(San Marino) AKM Motorsport							1	3	32
—N/a	(Japan) Kenji Hama	(Japan) JBR							4	5	18
—N/a	(Japan) Satoshi Hoshino	(Japan) JBR							4	5	18
—N/a	(Italy) Giuseppe Fascicolo	(Italy) Imperiale Racing							Ret	**6**	7
—N/a	(Italy) Alessandro Tarabini	(Italy) Imperiale Racing							Ret	**6**	7

==== GT Cup ====
===== Pro-Am Drivers' Championship (Division 1) =====
Pos.	Driver	Team	MIS (Italy)		IMO (Italy)		MUG (Italy)		MNZ (Italy)		Points
Pos.	Driver	Team	R1	R2	R1	R2	R1	R2	R1 (Note: The race was planned to run for 24 laps, but ended at lap 7 due to darkness following the accumulated delay during the afternoon. Hence, half points were given to the teams who finished in the top ten positions.)	R2 (Note: The race was planned to run for 24 laps, but ended at lap 21 with the red flag due to a multiple-car incident at the second restart. However, full points were given to the teams who finished in the top ten positions since more than 75% of the total laps were completed.)	Points
1	(France) Stephane Tribaudini	(Italy) Vincenzo Sospiri Racing	9	**1**	4	2	1	**3**	4	9	88
1	(Italy) Ignazio Zanon	(Italy) Vincenzo Sospiri Racing	9	**1**	4	2	1	**3**	4	9	88
2	(Italy) Giacomo Pollini	(Italy) Giacomo Race	1	3	1	9	**5**	2	5	6	88
2	(Italy) Matteo Pollini	(Italy) Giacomo Race	1	3	1	9	**5**	2	5	6	88
3	(Italy) Simone Patrinicola	(Italy) Best Lap	14	Ret	**6**	1	3	6	3	**1**	72
3	(Italy) Lorenzo Pegoraro	(Italy) Best Lap	14	Ret	**6**	1	3	6	3	**1**	72
4	(Egypt) Ibrahim Badawy	(Italy) DL Racing	5	7	7	6	Ret	1	9	3	55
5	(Italy) Rosario Messina	(Italy) MM Motorsport	8	9	3	10	2	4	Ret	4	53
6	(Italy) Diego di Fabio	(Italy) Easy Race	**4**	5	Ret	7	Ret	7	**1**	5	48
6	(Italy) Emiliano Pierantoni	(Italy) Easy Race	**4**	5	Ret	7	Ret	7	**1**	5	48
7	(Italy) Andrea Fontana	(Italy) DL Racing	2	4	5	Ret	Ret	5			41
8	(Italy) Mattia Bucci	(Italy) Best Lap	Ret	8	Ret	3	4	8	2	8	38.5
8	(Italy) Filippo Croccolino	(Italy) Best Lap	Ret	8	Ret	3	4	8	2	8	38.5
9	(Italy) Alessasndro Mainetti	(Italy) DL Racing	3	2	EX	Ret	Ret	5	6	Ret	38
10	(United Kingdom) Sam Hancock	(United Kingdom) RS Historics	10	11	2	**5**	6	9			35
10	(United Kingdom) Christopher Milner	(United Kingdom) RS Historics	10	11	2	**5**	6	9			35
11	(Belgium) Gilles Renmans	(Italy) Double TT Racing	12	6	Ret	4	Ret	11	8	2	32.5
12	(Italy) Tommaso Lovati	(Germany) Mertel Motorsport	7	Ret	Ret	8	Ret	Ret	7	7	13
Not classified
—N/a	(Italy) Federico Scionti	(Italy) DL Racing (Note: Scionti competed with Mertel Motorsport in Mugello.)	3	2	EX	Ret	Ret	Ret			27
—N/a	(Italy) Stefano Gattuso	(Italy) DL Racing	2	4							25
—N/a	(Italy) Mattia Raffetti	(Italy) MM Motorsport	8	9	3	10					18
—N/a	(Argentina) Luciano Martinez	(Italy) MM Motorsport							Ret	4	10
—N/a	(Italy) Diego Locanto	(Italy) DL Racing			5	Ret					8
—N/a	(Italy) Mauro Trentin	(Germany) Mertel Motorsport	7	Ret	Ret	8					7
—N/a	(Italy) Matteo Desideri	(Italy) CRM Motorsport	6	Ret							6
—N/a	(United Kingdom) Steven Liquorish	(Germany) Mertel Motorsport							7	7	6
—N/a	(Italy) Luca Segù	(Italy) DL Racing							6	Ret	3
—N/a	(Italy) Filippo Bencivenni	(Italy) Best Lap	11	10							1
—N/a	(Italy) Gianluca Carboni	(Italy) Best Lap	11	10							1
—N/a	(Slovenia) Matej Kosic	(Slovenia) Lema Racing					Ret	10			1
—N/a	(Finland) Elias Niskanen	(Slovenia) Lema Racing	13	Ret			Ret	10			1
—N/a	(Slovenia) Andrej Lah	(Slovenia) Lema Racing	13	Ret							0
—N/a	(Denmark) Largim Ali	(Italy) Target Racing			Ret	Ret					0
—N/a	(Italy) Raffaele Giannoni	(Italy) Target Racing			Ret	Ret					0
Pos.	Driver	Team	R1	R2	R1	R2	R1	R2	R1	R2	Points
Pos.	Driver	Team	MIS (Italy)		IMO (Italy)		MUG (Italy)		MNZ (Italy)		Points

===== Pro-Am Drivers' Championship (Division 2) =====
Pos.	Driver	Team	MIS (Italy)		IMO (Italy)		MUG (Italy)		MNZ (Italy)		Points
Pos.	Driver	Team	R1	R2	R1	R2	R1	R2	R1	R2	Points
1	(Italy) Massimo Navatta	(Italy) Raptor Engineering	**1**	**1**	**2**	1	1	1	4	1	144
1	(Italy) Andrea Palma	(Italy) Raptor Engineering	**1**	**1**	**2**	1	1	1	4	1	144
2	(Italy) Eugenio Pisani	(Italy) SP Racing	2	2	1	**2**	3	**2**	1	3	121
2	(Italy) Stefano Zerbi	(Italy) SP Racing	2	2	1	**2**	3	**2**	1	3	121
Not classified
—N/a	(Guatemala) Ian Rodríguez	(Italy) SP Racing					**2**	Ret	3	4	32
—N/a	(Italy) William Mezzetti	(Italy) EF Racing							**2**	**2**	22.5
—N/a	(Argentina) Fran Viel Bugliotti	(Italy) SP Racing							3	4	18
—N/a	(Netherlands) Laura van den Hengel	(Italy) SP Racing					**2**	Ret			16

===== Am Drivers' Championship (Division 1) =====
Pos.	Driver	Team	MIS (Italy)		IMO (Italy)		MUG (Italy)		MNZ (Italy)		Points
Pos.	Driver	Team	R1	R2	R1	R2	R1	R2	R1	R2	Points
1	(Italy) Edoardo Borrelli	(Italy) AF Corse	3	2	**1**	**9**	1	6	**1**	**5**	98
1	(Monaco) Lorenzo Casè	(Italy) AF Corse	3	2	**1**	**9**	1	6	**1**	**5**	98
2	(Italy) Ferdinando D'Auria	(Italy) HC Racing Division	**1**	**3**	5	6	**2**	**2**	9	6	90
3	(Italy) Ettore Carminati	(Italy) CRM Motorsport	2	Ret	3	1	4	3	3	3	87
3	(Italy) Bernardo Pellegrini	(Italy) CRM Motorsport	2	Ret	3	1	4	3	3	3	87
4	(Italy) Alberto Clementi Pisani	(Italy) HC Racing Division	Ret	1	6	5	7	1	2	2	80.5
4	(Italy) Piero Randazzo	(Italy) HC Racing Division	Ret	1	6	5	7	1	2	2	80.5
5	(Italy) Gaetano Oliva	(Italy) HC Racing Division	**1**	**3**	5	6			9	6	57
6	(Switzerland) Giovanni Naldi	(Italy) Best Lap	5	5	Ret	4	6	4	4	Ret	47
6	(Italy) Gianlugi Simonelli	(Italy) Best Lap	5	5	Ret	4	6	4	4	Ret	47
7	(Turkey) Vedat Ali Dalokay	(Italy) DL Racing	4	4	10	Ret	3	Ret	6	4	46
7	(Italy) Nicola Tagliapietra	(Italy) DL Racing	4	4	10	Ret	3	Ret	6	4	46
8	(Italy) Emma Segattini	(Italy) Pinetti Motorsport	6	6	9	Ret	5	5			30
9	(Italy) Victor Briselli	(Italy) Pinetti Motorsport	6	6	9	Ret			7	7	20
10	(Italy) Giovanni Stefanin	(Italy) Pinetti Motorsport	7	Ret	11	Ret			10	Ret	4.5
Not classified
—N/a	(China) Huilin Han	(Italy) Target Racing			2	3					27
—N/a	(Italy) Edoardo Barbolini	(Italy) Invictus Corse							5	1	24
—N/a	(Italy) Giuseppe Forenzi	(Italy) Invictus Corse							5	1	24
—N/a	(Italy) Gianluca Carboni	(Italy) Best Lap			7	2					19
—N/a	(Switzerland) Ivan David Mari	(Italy) Best Lap			7	2					19
—N/a	(Italy) Adriano Bernazzani	(Italy) Pinetti Motorsport					5	5			16
—N/a	(Italy) Michele La Marca	(Germany) Mertel Motorsport	8	7	8	8					13
—N/a	(Italy) Marco Verzelli	(Germany) Mertel Motorsport	8	7	8	8					13
—N/a	(Italy) Gianmarco Ercoli	(Italy) Double TT Racing			4	10					12
—N/a	(United Kingdom) Mark Adrian Locke	(Italy) Double TT Racing			4	10					12
—N/a	(San Marino) Luciano Privitello	(Italy) Scuderia Villorba Corse			Ret	7			8	8	8.5
—N/a	(Italy) Riccardo Tucci	(Italy) Pinetti Motorsport							7	7	6
—N/a	(Italy) Simone Vullo	(Italy) Pinetti Motorsport	7	Ret							4
—N/a	(Italy) Matteo Bergonzini	(Italy) Best Lap					Ret				0

===== Am Drivers' Championship (Division 2) =====
Pos.	Driver	Team	MIS (Italy)		IMO (Italy)		MUG (Italy)		MNZ (Italy)		Points
Pos.	Driver	Team	R1	R2	R1	R2	R1	R2	R1	R2	Points
1	(Italy) Nicolò Liana	(Italy) ZRS Motorsport	**1**	1	**1**	1	**Ret**	Ret	2	3	105.5
1	(Italy) Daniele Polverini	(Italy) ZRS Motorsport	**1**	1	**1**	1	**Ret**	Ret	2	3	105.5
2	(Switzerland) Ivan Martin Jacoma	(Switzerland) Centri Porsche Ticino	2	**3**			1	**1**	**Ret**	**1**	96
3	(Italy) Fabio Fabiani	(Italy) SP Racing	3	2	2	2	Ret	Ret	1	4	77
3	(Italy) Stefano Zanini	(Italy) SP Racing	3	2	2	2	Ret	Ret	1	4	77
4	(Monaco) Massimo Abbati	(Italy) SP Racing	4	4	3	**Ret**	2	2			63
4	(Monaco) Alberto Grisi	(Italy) SP Racing	4	4	3	**Ret**	2	2			63
Not classified
—N/a	(Italy) Valerio Presezzi	(Switzerland) Centri Porsche Ticino					1	**1**			43
—N/a	(Slovenia) Matej Knez	(Switzerland) Centri Porsche Ticino	2	**3**							30
—N/a	(Italy) Corrado Costa	(Italy) EF Racing							4	2	20
—N/a	(Netherlands) Sandra van der Sloot	(Italy) EF Racing							4	2	20
—N/a	(Belgium) Willem Meulders	(Belgium) Speed Lover							3	5	14
—N/a	(Belgium) Rik Renmans	(Belgium) Speed Lover							3	5	14

=== Constructors' championships ===
Points are awarded only to the highest finishing competitor from each constructor.

==== Scoring system ====
Position	**1st**	**2nd**	**3rd**	**4th**	**5th**	**6th**	**7th**	**8th**	**9th**	**10th**
Points	20	15	12	10	8	6	4	3	2	1

==== GT3 Sprint Constructors' Championship ====
Pos.	Constructor	Car	MIS (Italy)		IMO (Italy)		MUG (Italy)		MNZ (Italy)		Points
Pos.	Constructor	Car	R1	R2	R1	R2	R1	R2	R1	R2	Points
1	(Italy) BMW Italia Ceccato Racing	BMW M4 GT3	10	1	7	2	1	2	1	1	115
2	(Italy) Vincenzo Sospiri Racing	Lamborghini Huracán GT3 Evo 2	1	4	1	7	7	4	2	2	98
3	(San Marino) Tresor Audi Sport Italia	Audi R8 LMS Evo II	4	2	2	4	2	1	14	5	93
4	(Italy) AF Corse	Ferrari 296 GT3	2	3	11	3	16	3	6	6	63
5	(Italy) Imperiale Racing	Lamborghini Huracán GT3 Evo 2	5	11	16	1	9	7	3	7	50
6	(Italy) Nova Race	Honda NSX GT3 Evo22	15	9	8	8	4	8	7	9	27
7	(Italy) Lazarus Corse	Aston Martin Vantage AMR GT3	18	12	10	10	5	16	9	10	13
8	(San Marino) AKM Motorsport	Mercedes-AMG GT3 Evo	11	15	4	11	10	Ret	10	14	12
9	(Italy) EF Racing	Porsche 911 GT3 R (992)					Ret	Ret	4	12	10
10	(Italy) Iron Lynx	Lamborghini Huracán GT3 Evo 2							Ret	4	10
11	(Italy) Easy Race	Ferrari 296 GT3	12	22	5	9	DNS		Ret	13	10
12	(Switzerland) Fach Auto Tech	Porsche 911 GT3 R (992)	6	10							7
13	(Italy) Best Lap	Ferrari 488 GT3 Evo 2020	9	14	9	13					4
14	(Italy) Double TT Racing	Ferrari 488 GT3 Evo 2020	17	13	13	19	12	12	11	18	0
15	(Italy) Ebimotors	Porsche 911 GT3 R (992)	22	20	20	20	14	15	13	21	0
15	(Italy) Rossocorsa Racing	Ferrari 296 GT3	21	21	Ret	Ret	DNS		16	15	0
16	(Japan) JBR	Ferrari 296 GT3							15	19	0
17	(Italy) Pellin Racing	Ferrari 488 GT3 Evo 2020			21	22					0

==== GT Cup Sprint Constructors' Championship ====
===== Pro-Am (Division 1) =====
Pos.	Constructor	Car	MIS (Italy)		IMO (Italy)		MUG (Italy)		MNZ (Italy)		Points
Pos.	Constructor	Car	R1	R2	R1	R2	R1	R2	R1	R2	Points
1	(Italy) Vincenzo Sospiri Racing	Lamborghini Huracán GT3 Evo 2	9	1	4	2	1	3	4	9	86
2	(Italy) DL Racing	Lamborghini Huracán GT3 Evo 2	2	2	5	6	Ret	1	6	3	79
3	(Italy) Best Lap	Ferrari 488 Challenge Evo	11	8	6	1	3	6	2	1	74.5
4	(Italy) Giacomo Race	Lamborghini Huracán GT3 Evo 2	1	3	1	9	5	2	5	6	55
5	(Italy) MM Motorsport	Lamborghini Huracán GT3 Evo 2	8	9	3	10	2	4	Ret	4	53
6	(Italy) Easy Race	Ferrari 488 Challenge Evo	4	5	Ret	7	Ret	7	1	5	44
7	(Italy) Double TT Racing	Ferrari 488 Challenge Evo	12	6	Ret	4	Ret	11	8	2	32.5
8	(United Kingdom) RS Historics	Lamborghini Huracán GT3 Evo 2	10	11	2	5	6	9			32
9	(Germany) Mertel Motorsport	Ferrari 488 Challenge Evo	7	Ret	Ret	8	Ret	Ret	7	7	13
10	(Italy) CRM Motorsport	Ferrari 488 Challenge Evo	6	Ret							6
11	(Slovenia) Lema Racing	Ferrari 488 Challenge Evo	13	Ret			Ret	10			1
12	(Italy) Target Racing	Lamborghini Huracán Super Trofeo Evo 2			Ret	Ret					0

===== Pro-Am (Division 2) =====
Pos.	Constructor	Car	MIS (Italy)		IMO (Italy)		MUG (Italy)		MNZ (Italy)		Points
Pos.	Constructor	Car	R1	R2	R1	R2	R1	R2	R1	R2	Points
1	(Italy) Raptor Engineering	Porsche 911 GT3 R (992)	1	1	2	1	1	1	4	1	140
2	(Italy) SP Racing	Porsche 911 GT3 R (992)	2	2	1	2	2	2	1	3	117
3	(Italy) EF Racing	Porsche 911 GT3 R (992)							2	2	22.5

===== Am (Division 1) =====
Pos.	Constructor	Car	MIS (Italy)		IMO (Italy)		MUG (Italy)		MNZ (Italy)		Points
Pos.	Constructor	Car	R1	R2	R1	R2	R1	R2	R1	R2	Points
1	(Italy) HC Racing Division	Lamborghini Huracán Super Trofeo Evo 2	1	1	5	5	2	1	2	2	113.5
2	(Italy) AF Corse	Ferrari 488 Challenge Evo	3	2	1	9	1	6	1	5	93
3	(Italy) CRM Motorsport	Ferrari 488 Challenge Evo	2	Ret	3	1	4	3	3	3	87
4	(Italy) Best Lap	Ferrari 488 Challenge Evo	5	5	7	2	6	4	4	Ret	56
5	(Italy) DL Racing	Lamborghini Huracán Super Trofeo Evo 2	4	4	10	Ret	3	Ret	6	4	46
6	(Italy) Target Racing	Lamborghini Huracán Super Trofeo Evo 2			2	3					27
7	(Italy) Target Racing	Lamborghini Huracán Super Trofeo Evo 2							5	1	24
8	(Italy) Pinetti Motorsport	Ferrari 488 Challenge Evo	6	6	9	Ret	5	5	7	7	24
9	(Germany) Mertel Motorsport	Ferrari 488 Challenge Evo	8	7	8	8					13
10	(Italy) Double TT Racing	Ferrari 488 Challenge Evo			4	10					11
11	(Italy) Scuderia Villorba Corse	Lamborghini Huracán Super Trofeo Evo 2			Ret	10			8	8	11

===== Am (Division 2) =====
Pos.	Constructor	Car	MIS (Italy)		IMO (Italy)		MUG (Italy)		MNZ (Italy)		Points
Pos.	Constructor	Car	R1	R2	R1	R2	R1	R2	R1	R2	Points
1	(Italy) SP Racing	Porsche 911 GT3 R (992)	3	2	3	2	2	2	1	4	107
2	(Italy) ZRS Motorsport	Porsche 911 GT3 R (992)	1	1	1	1	Ret	Ret	2	3	99.5
3	(Switzerland) Centri Porsche Ticino	Porsche 911 GT3 R (992)	2	3			1	1	Ret	1	87
4	(Italy) EF Racing	Porsche 911 GT3 R (992)							4	2	20
5	(Belgium) Speed Lover	Porsche 911 GT3 R (992)							3	5	14

== Endurance ==
=== Entry list ===
Team	Car	No.	Drivers	Class	Rounds
GT3
(Italy) Pellin Racing	Ferrari 488 GT3 Evo 2020	3	(United States) Thor Haugen	PA	2
(Italy) Pellin Racing	Ferrari 488 GT3 Evo 2020	3	(Italy) Paolo Ruberti	PA	2
(Italy) Lazarus Corse	Aston Martin Vantage AMR GT3	5	(Finland) William Alatalo	P	1–3
(Italy) Lazarus Corse	Aston Martin Vantage AMR GT3	5	(Spain) Jorge Lorenzo	P	1–3
(Italy) Lazarus Corse	Aston Martin Vantage AMR GT3	5	(India) Mahaveer Raghunathan	P	1–2
(Italy) Lazarus Corse	Aston Martin Vantage AMR GT3	5	(Italy) Mattia di Giusto	P	3
(Italy) BMW Italia Ceccato Racing	BMW M4 GT3	7	(Italy) Stefano Comandini	P	All
(Italy) BMW Italia Ceccato Racing	BMW M4 GT3	7	(United States) Phillippe Denes	P	All
(Italy) BMW Italia Ceccato Racing	BMW M4 GT3	7	(Italy) Francesco Guerra	P	All
(Italy) BMW Italia Ceccato Racing	BMW M4 GT3	8	(Italy) Marco Cassarà	PA	All
(Italy) BMW Italia Ceccato Racing	BMW M4 GT3	8	(Italy) Francesco de Luca	PA	All
(Italy) BMW Italia Ceccato Racing	BMW M4 GT3	8	(Sweden) Alfred Nilsson	PA	All
(Italy) Tresor Attempto Racing	Audi R8 LMS Evo II	11	Andrey Mukovoz (Note: Mukovoz is Russian, but they compete as neutral competitors as Russian national emblems were banned by the FIA following the Russian invasion of Ukraine.)	Am	3
(Italy) Tresor Attempto Racing	Audi R8 LMS Evo II	11	(Italy) Lorenzo Patrese	Am	3
(Italy) Tresor Attempto Racing	Audi R8 LMS Evo II	11	(Germany) Florian Scholze	Am	3
(San Marino) Tresor Audi Sport Italia	Audi R8 LMS Evo II	12	(Germany) Alex Aka	P	All
(San Marino) Tresor Audi Sport Italia	Audi R8 LMS Evo II	12	(Italy) Pietro Delli Guanti	P	All
(San Marino) Tresor Audi Sport Italia	Audi R8 LMS Evo II	12	(Italy) Rocco Mazzola	P	All
(San Marino) Tresor Audi Sport Italia	Audi R8 LMS Evo II	99	(Italy) Andrea Cola	P	All
(San Marino) Tresor Audi Sport Italia	Audi R8 LMS Evo II	99	(Italy) Leonardo Moncini	P	All
(San Marino) Tresor Audi Sport Italia	Audi R8 LMS Evo II	99	(Netherlands) Glenn van Berlo	P	All
(San Marino) AKM Motorsport	Mercedes-AMG GT3 Evo	16	(Italy) Gustavo Sandrucci	PA	All
(San Marino) AKM Motorsport	Mercedes-AMG GT3 Evo	16	(Italy) Filippo Bencivenni	PA	1–3
(San Marino) AKM Motorsport	Mercedes-AMG GT3 Evo	16	(Italy) Lorenzo Ferrari	PA	1–3
(San Marino) AKM Motorsport	Mercedes-AMG GT3 Evo	16	(United States) Cambiz Aliabadi	PA	4
(San Marino) AKM Motorsport	Mercedes-AMG GT3 Evo	16	(Sweden) Oliver Söderström	PA	4
(Italy) EF Racing	Porsche 911 GT3 R (992)	17	(Italy) Enrico Fulgenzi	P	1–2
(Italy) EF Racing	Porsche 911 GT3 R (992)	17	(Italy) Kikko Galbiati	P	1–2
(Italy) EF Racing	Porsche 911 GT3 R (992)	17	(Italy) William Mezzetti	PA	3
(Italy) EF Racing	Porsche 911 GT3 R (992)	17	(Italy) Enrico Fulgenzi	PA	3
(Italy) Vincenzo Sospiri Racing	Lamborghini Huracán GT3 Evo 2	19	(Italy) Riccardo Cazzaniga	P	All
(Italy) Vincenzo Sospiri Racing	Lamborghini Huracán GT3 Evo 2	19	(Italy) Alberto Di Folco	P	All
(Italy) Vincenzo Sospiri Racing	Lamborghini Huracán GT3 Evo 2	19	(Italy) Edoardo Liberati	P	All
(Italy) Vincenzo Sospiri Racing	Lamborghini Huracán GT3 Evo 2	63	(Italy) Jacopo Guidetti	PA	All
(Italy) Vincenzo Sospiri Racing	Lamborghini Huracán GT3 Evo 2	63	(Belgium) Baptiste Moulin	PA	All
(Italy) Vincenzo Sospiri Racing	Lamborghini Huracán GT3 Evo 2	63	(France) Stephane Tribaudini	PA	All
(Italy) Vincenzo Sospiri Racing	Lamborghini Huracán GT3 Evo 2	66	(Belgium) Gilles Stadsbader	PA	All
(Italy) Vincenzo Sospiri Racing	Lamborghini Huracán GT3 Evo 2	66	(Italy) Mattia Michelotto	PA	2–4
(Italy) Vincenzo Sospiri Racing	Lamborghini Huracán GT3 Evo 2	66	(Italy) Ignazio Zanon	PA	3–4
(Italy) Vincenzo Sospiri Racing	Lamborghini Huracán GT3 Evo 2	66	(Italy) Alessandro Fabi	PA	1
(Italy) Vincenzo Sospiri Racing	Lamborghini Huracán GT3 Evo 2	66	(Italy) Stefano Costantini	PA	2
(Italy) Scuderia Baldini	Ferrari 296 GT3	27	(Italy) Giancarlo Fisichella	P	All
(Italy) Scuderia Baldini	Ferrari 296 GT3	27	(Monaco) Arthur Leclerc	P	All
(Italy) Scuderia Baldini	Ferrari 296 GT3	27	(Italy) Tommaso Mosca	P	All
(Italy) Nova Race	Mercedes-AMG GT3 Evo	28	(Italy) Andrea Bodellini	Am	All
(Italy) Nova Race	Mercedes-AMG GT3 Evo	28	(Italy) Fulvio Ferri	Am	All
(Italy) Nova Race	Mercedes-AMG GT3 Evo	28	(Italy) Alessandro Marchetti	Am	All
(Italy) Nova Race	Honda NSX GT3 Evo22	55	(Italy) Felice Jelmini	PA	1–2
(Italy) Nova Race	Honda NSX GT3 Evo22	55	(Italy) Vincenzo Scarpetta	PA	1–2
(Italy) Nova Race	Honda NSX GT3 Evo22	55	(Italy) Marco Butti	PA	1
(Italy) Nova Race	Honda NSX GT3 Evo22	55	(Italy) Filippo Berto	PA	2
(Italy) Nova Race	Honda NSX GT3 Evo22	55	(Italy) Alex Frassineti	P	3–4
(Italy) Nova Race	Honda NSX GT3 Evo22	55	(Italy) Felice Jelmini	P	3–4
(Italy) Nova Race	Honda NSX GT3 Evo22	55	(Italy) Kikko Galbiati	P	4
(Italy) Nova Race	Honda NSX GT3 Evo22	77	(Italy) Massimo Ciglia	Am	All
(Italy) Nova Race	Honda NSX GT3 Evo22	77	(Italy) Luca Magnoni	Am	All
(Italy) Nova Race	Honda NSX GT3 Evo22	77	(Italy) Rodolfo Massaro	Am	All
(Italy) Auto Sport Racing	Lamborghini Huracán GT3 Evo 2	32	(Thailand) Nuttapong Lertlamprasertkul	Am	All
(Italy) Auto Sport Racing	Lamborghini Huracán GT3 Evo 2	32	(Thailand) Aniwat Lommahadthai	Am	All
(Italy) Auto Sport Racing	Lamborghini Huracán GT3 Evo 2	32	(Croatia) Sandro Mur	Am	All
(Italy) Auto Sport Racing	Lamborghini Huracán GT3 Evo 2	33	(Thailand) Sanporn Jao-Javanil	Am	All
(Italy) Auto Sport Racing	Lamborghini Huracán GT3 Evo 2	33	(Serbia) Miloš Pavlović	Am	All
(Italy) Auto Sport Racing	Lamborghini Huracán GT3 Evo 2	33	(Germany) Florian Spengler	Am	All
(Italy) AF Corse	Ferrari 296 GT3	50	(Italy) Stefano Gai	PA	All
(Italy) AF Corse	Ferrari 296 GT3	50	(Denmark) Mikkel Mac	PA	All
(Italy) AF Corse	Ferrari 296 GT3	50	(Italy) Riccardo Ponzio	PA	All
(Italy) AF Corse	Ferrari 488 GT3 Evo 2020	51	(Italy) Alessandro Bracalente	PA	All
(Italy) AF Corse	Ferrari 488 GT3 Evo 2020	51	(Italy) Eliseo Donno	PA	All
(Italy) Imperiale Racing	Lamborghini Huracán GT3 Evo 2	54	(United States) Alexander Robert Bowen	Am	1, 3–4
(Italy) Imperiale Racing	Lamborghini Huracán GT3 Evo 2	54	(Italy) Giuseppe Fascicolo	Am	1, 3–4
(Italy) Imperiale Racing	Lamborghini Huracán GT3 Evo 2	54	(Kyrgyzstan) Dmitry Gvazava	Am	2–4
(Italy) Imperiale Racing	Lamborghini Huracán GT3 Evo 2	54	(United States) Aaron Farhadi	Am	1
(Italy) Imperiale Racing	Lamborghini Huracán GT3 Evo 2	85	(Italy) Alessio Deledda	PA	1–2, 4
(Italy) Imperiale Racing	Lamborghini Huracán GT3 Evo 2	85	(Switzerland) Kevin Gilardoni	PA	1–2, 4
(Italy) Imperiale Racing	Lamborghini Huracán GT3 Evo 2	85	(Poland) Robin Rogalski	PA	1–2
(Italy) Imperiale Racing	Lamborghini Huracán GT3 Evo 2	85	(Belgium) Ugo de Wilde	PA	4
(Italy) Double TT Racing	Ferrari 488 GT3 Evo 2020	75	(Italy) Leonardo Colavita	Am	All
(Italy) Double TT Racing	Ferrari 488 GT3 Evo 2020	75	(Italy) Simone Riccitelli	Am	All
(Italy) Double TT Racing	Ferrari 488 GT3 Evo 2020	75	(Switzerland) Christoph Ulrich	Am	All
GT Cup
(Italy) Easy Race	Ferrari 488 Challenge Evo	103	(Italy) Francesco La Mazza	PA	All
(Italy) Easy Race	Ferrari 488 Challenge Evo	103	(Italy) Emma Segattini	PA	3–4
(Italy) Easy Race	Ferrari 488 Challenge Evo	103	(Italy) Alex Bacci	PA	1–2
(Italy) Easy Race	Ferrari 488 Challenge Evo	103	(Italy) Emiliano Pierantoni	PA	1
(Italy) Easy Race	Ferrari 488 Challenge Evo	103	(Italy) Lorenzo Bontempelli	PA	2
(Italy) Easy Race	Ferrari 488 Challenge Evo	103	(Italy) Jody Lambrughi	PA	3
(Italy) Easy Race	Ferrari 488 Challenge Evo	103	(Italy) Vito Postiglione	PA	4
(Italy) Best Lap	Ferrari 488 Challenge Evo	111	(Italy) Luca Demarchi	PA	All
(Italy) Best Lap	Ferrari 488 Challenge Evo	111	(Italy) Sabatino Di Mare	PA	All
(Italy) Best Lap	Ferrari 488 Challenge Evo	111	(Italy) Simone Patrinicola	PA	All
(Italy) Best Lap	Ferrari 488 Challenge Evo	212	(Italy) Pietro Agoglia	Am	All
(Italy) Best Lap	Ferrari 488 Challenge Evo	212	(Italy) Filippo Croccolino	Am	2–4
(Italy) Best Lap	Ferrari 488 Challenge Evo	212	(Italy) Giammarco Marzialetti	Am	1–3
(Italy) Best Lap	Ferrari 488 Challenge Evo	212	(Italy) Vito Postiglione	Am	1
(Italy) Best Lap	Ferrari 488 Challenge Evo	212	(Italy) Gianluca Carboni	Am	4
(Italy) EF Racing	Porsche 992 GT3 Cup	117	(Italy) William Mezzetti	PA	4
(Italy) EF Racing	Porsche 992 GT3 Cup	117	(Italy) Vittoria Piria	PA	4
(Italy) Ebimotors	Porsche 992 GT3 Cup	122	(Italy) Daniele Cazzaniga	PA	All
(Italy) Ebimotors	Porsche 992 GT3 Cup	122	(Italy) Davide di Benedetto	PA	All
(Italy) Ebimotors	Porsche 992 GT3 Cup	122	(Italy) Giuseppe Nicolosi	PA	All
(Italy) Racevent	Porsche 992 GT3 Cup	127	(Italy) Giovanni Berton	PA	1–3
(Italy) Racevent	Porsche 992 GT3 Cup	127	(Italy) Ludovico Laurini	PA	1–3
(Italy) Racevent	Porsche 992 GT3 Cup	127	(Italy) Constantino Peroni	PA	1–3
(Italy) Racevent	Porsche 992 GT3 Cup	127	(Italy) Paolo Calcagno	PA	4
(Italy) Racevent	Porsche 992 GT3 Cup	127	(Italy) Jenny Sonzogni	PA	4
(Italy) Racevent	Porsche 992 GT3 Cup	127	(Italy) Ronnie Valori	PA	4
(Italy) DL Racing	Lamborghini Huracán Super Trofeo Evo 2	162	(Egypt) Ibrahim Badawy	PA	2
(Italy) DL Racing	Lamborghini Huracán Super Trofeo Evo 2	162	(Italy) Diego di Fabio	PA	2
(Italy) DL Racing	Lamborghini Huracán Super Trofeo Evo 2	162	(Portugal) Rodrigo Testa	PA	2
(Italy) DL Racing	Lamborghini Huracán Super Trofeo Evo 2	172	(Italy) Alessio Caiola	PA	All
(Italy) DL Racing	Lamborghini Huracán Super Trofeo Evo 2	172	(Italy) Luca Segù	PA	All
(Italy) DL Racing	Lamborghini Huracán Super Trofeo Evo 2	172	(Italy) Andrea Fontana	PA	2–4
(Italy) DL Racing	Lamborghini Huracán Super Trofeo Evo 2	272	(Italy) Alessandro Mainetti	Am	All
(Italy) DL Racing	Lamborghini Huracán Super Trofeo Evo 2	272	(Italy) Giacomo Riva	Am	All
(Italy) DL Racing	Lamborghini Huracán Super Trofeo Evo 2	272	(Italy) Stefano Gattuso	Am	1–3
(Italy) DL Racing	Lamborghini Huracán Super Trofeo Evo 2	272	(Portugal) Rodrigo Testa	Am	4
(Italy) Double TT Racing	Ferrari 488 Challenge Evo	177	(Belgium) Gilles Renmans	Am	4
(Italy) Double TT Racing	Ferrari 488 Challenge Evo	177	(Italy) Vincenzo Scarpetta	Am	4
(Italy) Formula Racing	Ferrari 296 GT3	182	(Italy) Michele Rugolo	G	4
(Italy) Formula Racing	Ferrari 296 GT3	182	(Netherlands) Willem van der Vorm	G	4
(Italy) Formula Racing	Ferrari 296 GT3	183	(United States) Rey Acosta	G	4
(Italy) Formula Racing	Ferrari 296 GT3	183	(Italy) Marco Bonanomi	G	4
(Italy) HC Racing Division	Lamborghini Huracán Super Trofeo Evo 2	202	(United Kingdom) Douglas Bolger	Am	All
(Italy) HC Racing Division	Lamborghini Huracán Super Trofeo Evo 2	202	(Italy) Alberto Clementi Pisani	Am	All
(Italy) HC Racing Division	Lamborghini Huracán Super Trofeo Evo 2	202	(Italy) Ferdinando D'Auria	Am	All
(Italy) Invictus Corse	Lamborghini Huracán Super Trofeo Evo 2	207	(Italy) Giovanni Anapoli	Am	All
(Italy) Invictus Corse	Lamborghini Huracán Super Trofeo Evo 2	207	(Italy) Edoardo Barbolini	Am	All
(Italy) Invictus Corse	Lamborghini Huracán Super Trofeo Evo 2	207	(Colombia) Andres Mendez	Am	All
(Italy) EF Racing	Porsche 992 GT3 Cup	217	(Italy) Andrea Buratti	Am	All
(Italy) EF Racing	Porsche 992 GT3 Cup	217	(Netherlands) Sandra van der Sloot	Am	All
(Italy) ZRS Motorsport	Porsche 992 GT3 Cup	224	(Italy) Pierluigi Moscone	Am	4
(Italy) ZRS Motorsport	Porsche 992 GT3 Cup	224	(Italy) Luca Rangoni	Am	4
(Italy) ZRS Motorsport	Porsche 992 GT3 Cup	225	(Italy) Steven Giacon	Am	4
(Italy) ZRS Motorsport	Porsche 992 GT3 Cup	225	(Italy) Luciano Micale	Am	4
(Italy) ZRS Motorsport	Porsche 992 GT3 Cup	225	(Italy) Paolo Prestipino	Am	4
(Slovenia) Lema Racing	Lamborghini Huracán Super Trofeo Evo 2	232	(Italy) Maurizio Fondi	Am	1–3
(Slovenia) Lema Racing	Lamborghini Huracán Super Trofeo Evo 2	232	(Slovenia) Matej Kosic	Am	1–3
(Slovenia) Lema Racing	Lamborghini Huracán Super Trofeo Evo 2	232	(Slovenia) Andrej Lah	Am	1–2
(Italy) Scuderia Ravetto & Ruberti	Ferrari 488 Challenge Evo	251	(Italy) Nicolas Risitano	PA	1–3
(Italy) Scuderia Ravetto & Ruberti	Ferrari 488 Challenge Evo	251	(Republic of Ireland) Lyle Schofield	PA	1–3
(Italy) Scuderia Ravetto & Ruberti	Ferrari 488 Challenge Evo	251	(Italy) Luca Attianese	PA	1–3
(Italy) Scuderia Ravetto & Ruberti	Ferrari 488 Challenge Evo	251	(Italy) Gianmarco Marzialetti	Am	4
(Italy) Scuderia Ravetto & Ruberti	Ferrari 488 Challenge Evo	251	(Italy) Nicolas Risitano	Am	4
(Italy) Scuderia Ravetto & Ruberti	Ferrari 488 Challenge Evo	251	(Republic of Ireland) Lyle Schofield	Am	4
(Italy) Reparto Corse RAM	Ferrari 488 Challenge Evo	255	(Italy) Fabio Daminato	Am	2, 4
(Italy) Reparto Corse RAM	Ferrari 488 Challenge Evo	255	(Italy) Giacomo Parisotto	Am	2, 4
(Italy) Reparto Corse RAM	Ferrari 488 Challenge Evo	255	(Italy) Mattia Simonini	Am	2, 4
(Switzerland) Centri Porsche Ticino	Porsche 992 GT3 Cup	291	(Italy) Max Busnelli	Am	1
(Switzerland) Centri Porsche Ticino	Porsche 992 GT3 Cup	291	(Switzerland) Ivan Martin Jacoma	Am	1
(Switzerland) Centri Porsche Ticino	Porsche 992 GT3 Cup	291	(Italy) Valerio Presezzi	Am	1
(Switzerland) Centri Porsche Ticino	Porsche 992 GT3 Cup	292	(Switzerland) Alex Fontana	Am	All
(Switzerland) Centri Porsche Ticino	Porsche 992 GT3 Cup	292	(Slovenia) Matej Knez	Am	All
(Switzerland) Centri Porsche Ticino	Porsche 992 GT3 Cup	292	(Italy) Patrick Hofmann	Am	3–4
(Switzerland) Centri Porsche Ticino	Porsche 992 GT3 Cup	292	(Italy) Stefano Borghi	Am	1

Icon	Class
**P**	Pro Cup
**PA**	Pro-Am Cup
**Am**	Am Cup
**G**	Guest

=== Results and standings ===
Bold indicates the overall winners.

==== GT3 ====
Round	Circuit	Date	Pole position	Pro winners	Pro-Am winners	Am winners
1	(Italy) ACI Vallelunga Circuit	16 June	(Italy) No. 27 Scuderia Baldini	**(Italy) No. 27 Scuderia Baldini**	(San Marino) No. 16 AKM Motorsport	(Italy) No. 75 Double TT Racing
1	(Italy) ACI Vallelunga Circuit	16 June	(Italy) Giancarlo Fisichella (Monaco) Arthur Leclerc (Italy) Tommaso Mosca	**(Italy) Giancarlo Fisichella** **(Monaco) Arthur Leclerc** **(Italy) Tommaso Mosca**	(Italy) Filippo Bencivenni (Italy) Lorenzo Ferrari (Italy) Gustavo Sandrucci	(Italy) Leonardo Colavita (Italy) Simone Riccitelli (Switzerland) Christoph Ulrich
2	(Italy) Autodromo Internazionale del Mugello	14 July	(Italy) No. 27 Scuderia Baldini	**(Italy) No. 50 AF Corse**	(Italy) No. 50 AF Corse	(Italy) No. 75 Double TT Racing
2	(Italy) Autodromo Internazionale del Mugello	14 July	(Italy) Giancarlo Fisichella (Monaco) Arthur Leclerc (Italy) Tommaso Mosca	**(Italy) Stefano Gai** **(Italy) Riccardo Ponzio** **(Denmark) Mikkel Mac**	(Italy) Stefano Gai (Italy) Riccardo Ponzio (Denmark) Mikkel Mac	(Italy) Leonardo Colavita (Italy) Simone Riccitelli (Switzerland) Christoph Ulrich
3	(Italy) Autodromo Internazionale Enzo e Dino Ferrari	8 September	(Italy) No. 19 Vincenzo Sospiri Racing	**(Italy) No. 55 Nova Race**	(Italy) No. 8 BMW Italia Ceccato Racing	(Italy) No. 28 Nova Race
3	(Italy) Autodromo Internazionale Enzo e Dino Ferrari	8 September	(Italy) Riccardo Cazzaniga (Italy) Alberto Di Folco (Italy) Edoardo Liberati	**(Italy) Alex Frassineti** **(Italy) Felice Jelmini**	(Italy) Marco Cassarà (Italy) Francesco de Luca (Sweden) Alfred Nilsson	(Italy) Andrea Bodellini (Italy) Fulvio Ferri (Italy) Alessandro Marchetti
4	(Italy) Autodromo Nazionale di Monza	27 October	(Italy) No. 27 Scuderia Baldini	**(Italy) No. 27 Scuderia Baldini**	(Italy) No. 66 Vincenzo Sospiri Racing	(Italy) No. 33 Auto Sport Racing
4	(Italy) Autodromo Nazionale di Monza	27 October	(Italy) Giancarlo Fisichella (Monaco) Arthur Leclerc (Italy) Tommaso Mosca	**(Italy) Giancarlo Fisichella** **(Monaco) Arthur Leclerc** **(Italy) Tommaso Mosca**	(Italy) Mattia Michelotto (Belgium) Gilles Stadsbader (Italy) Ignazio Zanon	(Thailand) Sanporn Jao-Javanil (Serbia) Miloš Pavlović (Germany) Florian Spengler

==== GT Cup ====
Round	Circuit	Date	Pole position	Div. 1 Pro-Am Winners	Div. 1 Am Winners	Div. 2 Pro-Am Winners	Div. 2 Am Winners
1	(Italy) ACI Vallelunga Circuit	16 June	(Italy) No. 172 DL Racing	(Italy) No. 172 DL Racing	(Italy) No. 202 HC Racing Division	(Italy) No. 127 Racevent	(Italy) No. 217 EF Racing
1	(Italy) ACI Vallelunga Circuit	16 June	(Italy) Alessio Caiola (Italy) Luca Segù	(Italy) Alessio Caiola (Italy) Luca Segù	(United Kingdom) Douglas Bolger (Italy) Alberto Clementi Pisani (Italy) Ferdinando D'Auria	(Italy) Giovanni Berton (Italy) Ludovico Laurini (Switzerland) Constantino Peroni	(Italy) Andrea Buratti (Netherlands) Sandra van der Sloot
2	(Italy) Autodromo Internazionale del Mugello	14 July	(Italy) No. 162 DL Racing	(Italy) No. 162 DL Racing	(Italy) No. 202 HC Racing Division	(Italy) No. 127 Racevent	(Italy) No. 217 EF Racing
2	(Italy) Autodromo Internazionale del Mugello	14 July	(Egypt) Ibrahim Badawy (Italy) Diego di Fabio (Portugal) Rodrigo Testa	(Egypt) Ibrahim Badawy (Italy) Diego di Fabio (Portugal) Rodrigo Testa	(United Kingdom) Douglas Bolger (Italy) Alberto Clementi Pisani (Italy) Ferdinando D'Auria	(Italy) Giovanni Berton (Italy) Ludovico Laurini (Switzerland) Constantino Peroni	(Italy) Andrea Buratti (Netherlands) Sandra van der Sloot
3	(Italy) Autodromo Internazionale Enzo e Dino Ferrari	8 September	(Italy) No. 111 Best Lap	(Italy) No. 103 Easy Race	(Italy) No. 272 DL Racing	(Italy) No. 127 Racevent	(Switzerland) No. 292 Centri Porsche Ticino
3	(Italy) Autodromo Internazionale Enzo e Dino Ferrari	8 September	(Italy) Luca Demarchi (Italy) Sabatino Di Mare (Portugal) Simone Patrinicola	(Italy) Francesco La Mazza (Italy) Jody Lambrughi (Italy) Emma Segattini	(Italy) Stefano Gattuso (Italy) Alessandro Mainetti (Italy) Giacomo Riva	(Italy) Giovanni Berton (Italy) Ludovico Laurini (Italy) Constantino Peroni	(Switzerland) Alex Fontana (Slovenia) Matej Knez (Italy) Patrick Hofmann
4	(Italy) Autodromo Nazionale di Monza	27 October	(Italy) No. 182 Formula Racing	(Italy) No. 103 Easy Race	(Italy) No. 202 HC Racing Division	(Italy) No. 117 EF Racing	(Switzerland) No. 292 Centri Porsche Ticino
4	(Italy) Autodromo Nazionale di Monza	27 October	(Italy) Michele Rugolo (Netherlands) Willem van der Vorm	(Italy) Luca Demarchi (Italy) Sabatino Di Mare (Portugal) Simone Patrinicola	(United Kingdom) Douglas Bolger (Italy) Alberto Clementi Pisani (Italy) Ferdinando D'Auria	(Italy) William Mezzetti (Italy) Vittoria Piria	(Switzerland) Alex Fontana (Slovenia) Matej Knez (Italy) Patrick Hofmann

=== Drivers' championships ===
==== Scoring system ====
Duration	**1st**	**2nd**	**3rd**	**4th**	**5th**	**6th**	**7th**	**8th**	**9th**	**10th**	**Pole**	**FL**
100 Minutes	12	10	8	7	6	5	4	3	2	1		
3 Hours	20	15	12	10	8	6	4	3	2	1	1	1

==== GT3 ====
===== Endurance Drivers' Championship =====
Pos.	Driver	Team	VAL (Italy)		MUG (Italy)		IMO (Italy)		MNZ (Italy)		Points
Pos.	Driver	Team	100	3H	100	3H	100	3H (Note: The race was planned to run for three hours, but ended at the 104-minute mark due to heavy rain. Hence, half points were given to the teams who finished in the top ten positions.)	100	3H	Points
1	(Italy) Giancarlo Fisichella	(Italy) Scuderia Baldini	1	**1**	11	**7**	4	4	1	**1**	79
1	(Monaco) Arthur Leclerc	(Italy) Scuderia Baldini	1	**1**	11	**7**	4	4	1	**1**	79
1	(Italy) Tommaso Mosca	(Italy) Scuderia Baldini	1	**1**	11	**7**	4	4	1	**1**	79
2	(Italy) Riccardo Cazzaniga	(Italy) Vincenzo Sospiri Racing	4	4	3	2	3	**3**	2	3	62
2	(Italy) Alberto Di Folco	(Italy) Vincenzo Sospiri Racing	4	4	3	2	3	**3**	2	3	62
2	(Italy) Edoardo Liberati	(Italy) Vincenzo Sospiri Racing	4	4	3	2	3	**3**	2	3	62
3	(Italy) Stefano Comandini	(Italy) BMW Italia Ceccato Racing	2	3	22	Ret	2	2	6	4	54.5
3	(United States) Phillippe Denes	(Italy) BMW Italia Ceccato Racing	2	3	22	Ret	2	2	6	4	54.5
3	(Italy) Francesco Guerra	(Italy) BMW Italia Ceccato Racing	2	3	22	Ret	2	2	6	4	54.5
4	(Germany) Alex Aka	(San Marino) Tresor Audi Sport Italia	3	2	6	5	Ret	Ret	4	16	43
4	(Italy) Pietro Delli Guanti	(San Marino) Tresor Audi Sport Italia	3	2	6	5	Ret	Ret	4	16	43
4	(Italy) Rocco Mazzola	(San Marino) Tresor Audi Sport Italia	3	2	6	5	Ret	Ret	4	16	43
5	(Italy) Stefano Gai	(Italy) AF Corse	11	11	1	1	6	6	8	14	42.5
5	(Denmark) Mikkel Mac	(Italy) AF Corse	11	11	1	1	6	6	8	14	42.5
5	(Italy) Riccardo Ponzio	(Italy) AF Corse	11	11	1	1	6	6	8	14	42.5
6	(Belgium) Gilles Stadsbader	(Italy) Vincenzo Sospiri Racing	9	9	9	4	8	8	5	2	40
7	(Italy) Mattia Michelotto	(Italy) Vincenzo Sospiri Racing			9	4	8	8	5	2	38.5
8	(Italy) Andrea Cola	(San Marino) Tresor Audi Sport Italia	8	5	5	3	11	11	16	Ret	31
8	(Italy) Leonardo Moncini	(San Marino) Tresor Audi Sport Italia	8	5	5	3	11	11	16	Ret	31
8	(Netherlands) Glenn van Berlo	(San Marino) Tresor Audi Sport Italia	8	5	5	3	11	11	16	Ret	31
9	(Italy) Felice Jelmini	(Italy) Nova Race	13	13	21	Ret	1	1	10	7	28
10	(Italy) Kikko Galbiati	(Italy) EF Racing (Note: Galbiati competed with Nova Race in Monza.)	7	7	2	20			10	7	23
11	(Italy) Jacopo Guidetti	(Italy) Vincenzo Sospiri Racing	10	10	7	6	Ret	Ret	3	8	22
11	(Belgium) Baptiste Moulin	(Italy) Vincenzo Sospiri Racing	10	10	7	6	Ret	Ret	3	8	22
11	(France) Stephane Tribaudini	(Italy) Vincenzo Sospiri Racing	10	10	7	6	Ret	Ret	3	8	22
12	(Italy) Enrico Fulgenzi	(Italy) EF Racing	7	7	2	20	14	14			18
13	(Italy) Marco Cassarà	(Italy) BMW Italia Ceccato Racing	20	NC	13	10	5	5	9	6	17.5
13	(Italy) Francesco de Luca	(Italy) BMW Italia Ceccato Racing	20	NC	13	10	5	5	9	6	17.5
13	(Sweden) Alfred Nilsson	(Italy) BMW Italia Ceccato Racing	20	NC	13	10	5	5	9	6	17.5
14	(Italy) Alessandro Bracalente	(Italy) AF Corse	6	8	4	8	12	12	15	12	17
14	(Italy) Eliseo Donno	(Italy) AF Corse	6	8	4	8	12	12	15	12	17
15	(Italy) Filippo Bencivenni	(San Marino) AKM Motorsport	5	6	8	19	17	17			14
15	(Italy) Lorenzo Ferrari	(San Marino) AKM Motorsport	5	6	8	19	17	17			14
15	(Italy) Gustavo Sandrucci	(San Marino) AKM Motorsport	5	6	8	19	17	17	Ret	Ret	14
16	(Italy) Alessio Deledda	(Italy) Imperiale Racing	12	12	10	9	13	13	7	5	14
16	(Switzerland) Kevin Gilardoni	(Italy) Imperiale Racing	12	12	10	9	13	13	7	5	14
17	(Italy) Andrea Bodellini	(Italy) Nova Race	16	16	17	15	7	7	11	10	7
17	(Italy) Fulvio Ferri	(Italy) Nova Race	16	16	17	15	7	7	11	10	7
17	(Italy) Alessandro Marchetti	(Italy) Nova Race	16	16	17	15	7	7	11	10	7
18	(Thailand) Sanporn Jao-Javanil	(Italy) Auto Sport Racing	21	Ret	20	17	10	10	13	9	3.5
18	(Serbia) Miloš Pavlović	(Italy) Auto Sport Racing	21	Ret	20	17	10	10	13	9	3.5
18	(Germany) Florian Spengler	(Italy) Auto Sport Racing	21	Ret	20	17	10	10	13	9	3.5
19	(Italy) Massimo Ciglia	(Italy) Nova Race	18	17	16	13	Ret	Ret	12	11	0
19	(Italy) Luca Magnoni	(Italy) Nova Race	18	17	16	13	Ret	Ret	12	11	0
19	(Italy) Rodolfo Massaro	(Italy) Nova Race	18	17	16	13	Ret	Ret	12	11	0
20	(Finland) William Alatalo	(Italy) Lazarus Corse	14	14	12	11	Ret	Ret			0
20	(Spain) Jorge Lorenzo	(Italy) Lazarus Corse	14	14	12	11	Ret	Ret			0
21	(Italy) Leonardo Colavita	(Italy) Double TT Racing	15	15	15	12	16	15	17	15	0
21	(Italy) Simone Riccitelli	(Italy) Double TT Racing	15	15	15	12	16	15	17	15	0
21	(Switzerland) Christoph Ulrich	(Italy) Double TT Racing	15	15	15	12	16	15	17	15	0
22	(Thailand) Nuttapong Lertlamprasertkul	(Italy) Auto Sport Racing	19	19	18	16	15	16	14	13	0
22	(Thailand) Aniwat Lommahadthai	(Italy) Auto Sport Racing	19	19	18	16	15	16	14	13	0
22	(Croatia) Sandro Mur	(Italy) Auto Sport Racing	19	19	18	16	15	16	14	13	0
23	(Kyrgyzstan) Dmitry Gvazava	(Italy) Imperiale Racing			14	14	18	18	Ret	Ret	0
23	(United States) Alexander Robert Bowen	(Italy) Imperiale Racing	17	18	14	14	18	18	Ret	Ret	0
23	(Italy) Giuseppe Fascicolo	(Italy) Imperiale Racing	17	18	14	14	18	18	Ret	Ret	0
Not classified (Note: Under Article 26 of the Endurance Regulations, in order to participate in the final rankings of the Championship, each driver must have carried out at least three events.)
—N/a	(Italy) Alex Frassineti	(Italy) Nova Race					1	1	10	7	29
—N/a	(Italy) Ignazio Zanon	(Italy) Vincenzo Sospiri Racing					8	8	5	2	25.5
—N/a	(Italy) Stefano Costantini	(Italy) Vincenzo Sospiri Racing			9	4					14
—N/a	(Belgium) Ugo de Wilde	(Italy) Imperiale Racing					13	13	7	5	11
—N/a	(Italy) Alessandro Fabi	(Italy) Vincenzo Sospiri Racing	9	9							5
—N/a	(Poland) Robin Rogalski	(Italy) Imperiale Racing	12	12	10	9					3
—N/a	Andrey Mukovoz	(Italy) Tresor Attempto Racing					9	9			2
—N/a	(Italy) Lorenzo Patrese	(Italy) Tresor Attempto Racing					9	9			2
—N/a	(Germany) Florian Scholze	(Italy) Tresor Attempto Racing					9	9			2
—N/a	(India) Mahaveer Raghunathan	(Italy) Lazarus Corse	14	14	12	11					0
—N/a	(Italy) Marco Butti	(Italy) Nova Race	13	13							0
—N/a	(Italy) Vincenzo Scarpetta	(Italy) Nova Race	13	13	21	Ret					0
—N/a	(Italy) William Mezzetti	(Italy) EF Racing					14	14			0
—N/a	(United States) Aaron Farhadi	(Italy) Imperiale Racing	17	18							0
—N/a	(United States) Thor Haugen	(Italy) Pellin Racing			19	18					0
—N/a	(Italy) Paolo Ruberti	(Italy) Pellin Racing			19	18					0
—N/a	(Italy) Filippo Berto	(Italy) Nova Race			21	Ret					0
—N/a	(Italy) Mattia Di Giusto	(Italy) Lazarus Corse					Ret	Ret			0
—N/a	(United States) Cambiz Aliabadi	(San Marino) AKM Motorsport							Ret	Ret	0
—N/a	(Sweden) Oliver Söderström	(San Marino) AKM Motorsport							Ret	Ret	0
Pos.	Driver	Team	100	3H	100	3H	100	3H	100	3H	Points
Pos.	Driver	Team	VAL (Italy)		MUG (Italy)		IMO (Italy)		MNZ (Italy)		Points

Colour	Result
Gold	Winner
Silver	Second place
Bronze	Third place
Green	Points classification
Blue	Non-points classification
Blue	Non-classified finish (NC)
Purple	Retired, not classified (Ret)
Red	Did not qualify (DNQ)
Red	Did not pre-qualify (DNPQ)
Black	Disqualified (DSQ)
White	Did not start (DNS)
White	Withdrew (WD)
White	Race cancelled (C)
Blank	Did not practice (DNP)
Blank	Did not arrive (DNA)
Blank	Excluded (EX)

**Bold** - Pole position/fastest qualifying time
Italics - Fastest lap

===== Pro-Am Drivers' Championship =====
Pos.	Driver	Team	VAL (Italy)		MUG (Italy)		IMO (Italy)		MNZ (Italy)		Points
Pos.	Driver	Team	100	3H	100	3H	100	3H	100	3H	Points
1	(Belgium) Gilles Stadsbader	(Italy) Vincenzo Sospiri Racing	3	2	5	2	3	3	2	1	79
2	(Italy) Mattia Michelotto	(Italy) Vincenzo Sospiri Racing			5	2	3	3	2	1	68
3	(Italy) Stefano Gai	(Italy) AF Corse	5	5	1	1	2	2	3	5	64.5
3	(Denmark) Mikkel Mac	(Italy) AF Corse	5	5	1	1	2	2	3	5	64.5
3	(Italy) Riccardo Ponzio	(Italy) AF Corse	5	5	1	1	2	2	3	5	64.5
4	(Italy) Jacopo Guidetti	(Italy) Vincenzo Sospiri Racing	4	4	3	3	Ret	Ret	1	**3**	62
4	(Belgium) Baptiste Moulin	(Italy) Vincenzo Sospiri Racing	4	4	3	3	Ret	Ret	1	**3**	62
4	(France) Stephane Tribaudini	(Italy) Vincenzo Sospiri Racing	4	4	3	3	Ret	Ret	1	**3**	62
5	(Italy) Alessandro Bracalente	(Italy) AF Corse	2	**3**	2	**4**	4	4	5	4	61
5	(Italy) Eliseo Donno	(Italy) AF Corse	2	**3**	2	**4**	4	4	5	4	61
6	(Italy) Marco Cassarà	(Italy) BMW Italia Ceccato Racing	9	9	8	6	1	1	4	2	52
6	(Italy) Francesco de Luca	(Italy) BMW Italia Ceccato Racing	9	9	8	6	1	1	4	2	52
6	(Sweden) Alfred Nilsson	(Italy) BMW Italia Ceccato Racing	9	9	8	6	1	1	4	2	52
7	(Italy) Filippo Bencivenni	(San Marino) AKM Motorsport	1	1	4	9	6	**6**			50.5
7	(Italy) Lorenzo Ferrari	(San Marino) AKM Motorsport	1	1	4	9	6	**6**			50.5
7	(Italy) Gustavo Sandrucci	(San Marino) AKM Motorsport	1	1	4	9	6	**6**	Ret	Ret	50.5
8	(Finland) William Alatalo	(Italy) Lazarus Corse	8	8	7	7	Ret	Ret			14
8	(Spain) Jorge Lorenzo	(Italy) Lazarus Corse	8	8	7	7	Ret	Ret			14
Not classified
—N/a	(Belgium) Ignazio Zanon	(Italy) Vincenzo Sospiri Racing					3	3	2	1	25
—N/a	(Italy) Alessandro Fabi	(Italy) Vincenzo Sospiri Racing	3	2							23
—N/a	(Italy) Stefano Costantini	(Italy) Vincenzo Sospiri Racing			5	2					22
—N/a	(Italy) Alessio Deledda	(Italy) Imperiale Racing	6	6	6	5					22
—N/a	(Switzerland) Kevin Gilardoni	(Italy) Imperiale Racing	6	6	6	5					22
—N/a	(Poland) Robin Rogalski	(Italy) Imperiale Racing	6	6	6	5					22
—N/a	(India) Mahaveer Raghunathan	(Italy) Lazarus Corse	8	8	7	7					14
—N/a	(Italy) Enrico Fulgenzi	(Italy) EF Racing					5	5			9.5
—N/a	(Italy) William Mezzetti	(Italy) EF Racing					5	5			9.5
—N/a	(Italy) Felice Jelmini	(Italy) Nova Race	7	7	10	Ret					9
—N/a	(Italy) Vincenzo Scarpetta	(Italy) Nova Race	7	7	10	Ret					9
—N/a	(Italy) Marco Butti	(Italy) Nova Race	7	7							8
—N/a	(United States) Thor Haugen	(Italy) Pellin Racing			9	8					5
—N/a	(Italy) Paolo Ruberti	(Italy) Pellin Racing			9	8					5
—N/a	(Italy) Filippo Berto	(Italy) Nova Race			10	Ret					1
—N/a	(Italy) Mattia Di Giusto	(Italy) Lazarus Corse					Ret	Ret			0
—N/a	(United States) Cambiz Aliabadi	(San Marino) AKM Motorsport							Ret	Ret	0
—N/a	(Sweden) Oliver Söderström	(San Marino) AKM Motorsport							Ret	Ret	0
Pos.	Driver	Team	100	3H	100	3H	100	3H	100	3H	Points
Pos.	Driver	Team	VAL (Italy)		MUG (Italy)		IMO (Italy)		MNZ (Italy)		Points

===== Am Drivers' Championship =====
Pos.	Driver	Team	VAL (Italy)		MUG (Italy)		IMO (Italy)		MNZ (Italy)		Points
Pos.	Driver	Team	100	3H	100	3H	100	3H	100	3H	Points
1	(Italy) Leonardo Colavita	(Italy) Double TT Racing	1	**1**	2	**1**	5	4	5	5	78
1	(Italy) Simone Riccitelli	(Italy) Double TT Racing	1	**1**	2	**1**	5	4	5	5	78
1	(Switzerland) Christoph Ulrich	(Italy) Double TT Racing	1	**1**	2	**1**	5	4	5	5	78
2	(Italy) Andrea Bodellini	(Italy) Nova Race	2	2	4	4	1	1	1	2	74
2	(Italy) Fulvio Ferri	(Italy) Nova Race	2	2	4	4	1	1	1	2	74
2	(Italy) Alessandro Marchetti	(Italy) Nova Race	2	2	4	4	1	1	1	2	74
3	(Italy) Massimo Ciglia	(Italy) Nova Race	4	3	3	2	Ret	**Ret**	2	3	65
3	(Italy) Luca Magnoni	(Italy) Nova Race	4	3	3	2	Ret	**Ret**	2	3	65
3	(Italy) Rodolfo Massaro	(Italy) Nova Race	4	3	3	2	Ret	**Ret**	2	3	65
4	(Thailand) Sanporn Jao-Javanil	(Italy) Auto Sport Racing	6	6	6	6	3	3	3	1	55
4	(Serbia) Miloš Pavlović	(Italy) Auto Sport Racing	6	6	6	6	3	3	3	1	55
4	(Germany) Florian Spengler	(Italy) Auto Sport Racing	6	6	6	6	3	3	3	1	55
5	(United States) Alexander Robert Bowen	(Italy) Imperiale Racing	3	4	1	3	6	6	Ret	**Ret**	49.5
5	(Italy) Giuseppe Fascicolo	(Italy) Imperiale Racing	3	4	1	3	6	6	Ret	**Ret**	49.5
6	(Thailand) Nuttapong Lertlamprasertkul	(Italy) Auto Sport Racing	5	5	5	5	4	5	4	4	44
6	(Thailand) Aniwat Lommahadthai	(Italy) Auto Sport Racing	5	5	5	5	4	5	4	4	44
6	(Croatia) Sandro Mur	(Italy) Auto Sport Racing	5	5	5	5	4	5	4	4	44
7	(Kyrgyzstan) Dmitry Gvazava	(Italy) Imperiale Racing			1	3	6	6	Ret	**Ret**	31.5
Not classified
—N/a	(United States) Aaron Farhadi	(Italy) Imperiale Racing	3	4							18
—N/a	Andrey Mukovoz	(Italy) Tresor Attempto Racing					2	2			17.5
—N/a	(Italy) Lorenzo Patrese	(Italy) Tresor Attempto Racing					2	2			17.5
—N/a	(Germany) Florian Scholze	(Italy) Tresor Attempto Racing					2	2			17.5
Pos.	Driver	Team	100	3H	100	3H	100	3H	100	3H	Points
Pos.	Driver	Team	VAL (Italy)		MUG (Italy)		IMO (Italy)		MNZ (Italy)		Points

==== GT Cup ====
===== Pro-Am Drivers' Championship (Division 1) =====
Pos.	Driver	Team	VAL (Italy)		MUG (Italy)		IMO (Italy)		MNZ (Italy)		Points
Pos.	Driver	Team	100	3H	100	3H	100	3H	100	3H	Points
1	(Italy) Luca Demarchi	(Italy) Best Lap	2	2	2	3	2	**2**	1	1	81
1	(Italy) Sabatino Di Mare	(Italy) Best Lap	2	2	2	3	2	**2**	1	1	81
1	(Italy) Simone Patrinicola	(Italy) Best Lap	2	2	2	3	2	**2**	1	1	81
2	(Italy) Alessio Caiola	(Italy) DL Racing	1	**1**	3	2	4	4	3	Ret	73
2	(Italy) Luca Segù	(Italy) DL Racing	1	**1**	3	2	4	4	3	Ret	73
3	(Italy) Francesco La Mazza	(Italy) Easy Race	4	4	4	4	1	1	4	Ret	58
4	(Italy) Luca Attianese	(Italy) Scuderia Ravetto & Ruberti	3	3	4	5	3	3			48
4	(Italy) Nicolas Risitano	(Italy) Scuderia Ravetto & Ruberti	3	3	4	5	3	3			48
4	(Republic of Ireland) Lyle Schofield	(Italy) Scuderia Ravetto & Ruberti	3	3	4	5	3	3			48
5	(Italy) Andrea Fontana	(Italy) DL Racing			3	2	4	4	3	Ret	36
Not classified
—N/a	(Egypt) Ibrahim Badawy	(Italy) DL Racing			1	**1**					34
—N/a	(Italy) Diego di Fabio	(Italy) DL Racing			1	**1**					34
—N/a	(Portugal) Rodrigo Testa	(Italy) DL Racing			1	**1**					34
—N/a	(Italy) Alex Bacci	(Italy) Easy Race	4	4	4	4					33
—N/a	(Italy) Emma Segattini	(Italy) Easy Race					1	1	4	Ret	29
—N/a	(Belgium) Gilles Renmans	(Italy) Double TT Racing							2	**2**	26
—N/a	(Belgium) Vincenzo Scarpetta	(Italy) Double TT Racing							2	**2**	26
—N/a	(Italy) Jody Lambrughi	(Italy) Easy Race					1	1			22
—N/a	(Italy) Emiliano Pierantoni	(Italy) Easy Race	4	4							17
—N/a	(Italy) Lorenzo Bontempelli	(Italy) Easy Race			4	4					16
—N/a	(Italy) Vito Postiglione	(Italy) Easy Race							4	Ret	7
Guest drivers
—N/a	(United States) Rey Acosta	(Italy) Formula Racing							1	1	0
—N/a	(Italy) Marco Bonanomi	(Italy) Formula Racing							1	1	0
—N/a	(Italy) Michele Rugolo	(Italy) Formula Racing							2	Ret	0
—N/a	(Netherlands) Willem van der Vorm	(Italy) Formula Racing							2	Ret	0
Pos.	Driver	Team	100	3H	100	3H	100	3H	100	3H	Points
Pos.	Driver	Team	VAL (Italy)		MUG (Italy)		IMO (Italy)		MNZ (Italy)		Points

===== Pro-Am Drivers' Championship (Division 2) =====
Pos.	Driver	Team	VAL (Italy)		MUG (Italy)		IMO (Italy)		MNZ (Italy)		Points
Pos.	Driver	Team	100	3H	100	3H	100	3H	100	3H	Points
1	(Italy) Giovanni Berton	(Italy) Racevent	1	**1**	1	**1**	1	**1**			91
1	(Italy) Ludovico Laurini	(Italy) Racevent	1	**1**	1	**1**	1	**1**			91
1	(Italy) Constantino Peroni	(Italy) Racevent	1	**1**	1	**1**	1	**1**			91
2	(Italy) Daniele Cazzaniga	(Italy) Ebimotors	2	2	2	2	2	2	2	2	77
2	(Italy) Davide di Benedetto	(Italy) Ebimotors	2	2	2	2	2	2	2	2	77
2	(Italy) Giuseppe Nicolosi	(Italy) Ebimotors	2	2	2	2	2	2	2	2	77
Not classified
—N/a	(Italy) William Mezzetti	(Italy) EF Racing							1	**1**	33
—N/a	(Italy) Vittoria Piria	(Italy) EF Racing							1	**1**	33
—N/a	(Italy) Paolo Calcagno	(Italy) Racevent							3	3	20
—N/a	(Italy) Jenny Sonzogni	(Italy) Racevent							3	3	20
—N/a	(Italy) Ronnie Valori	(Italy) Racevent							3	3	20

===== Am Drivers' Championship (Division 1) =====
Pos.	Driver	Team	VAL (Italy)		MUG (Italy)		IMO (Italy)		MNZ (Italy)		Points
Pos.	Driver	Team	100	3H	100	3H	100	3H	100	3H	Points
1	(United Kingdom) Douglas Bolger	(Italy) HC Racing Division	1	**3**	1	**2**	2	**2**	4	1	87
1	(Italy) Alberto Clementi Pisani	(Italy) HC Racing Division	1	**3**	1	**2**	2	**2**	4	1	87
1	(Italy) Ferdinando D'Auria	(Italy) HC Racing Division	1	**3**	1	**2**	2	**2**	4	1	87
2	(Italy) Pietro Agoglia	(Italy) Best Lap	3	2	2	1	4	4	1	4	76
3	(Italy) Giammarco Marzialetti	(Italy) Best Lap (Note: Marzialetti competed with Scuderia Ravetto & Ruberti in Monza.)	3	2	2	1	4	4	3	3	74
4	(Italy) Stefano Gattuso	(Italy) DL Racing	2	1	4	3	1	1			71
4	(Italy) Alessandro Mainetti	(Italy) DL Racing	2	1	4	3	1	1	Ret	Ret	71
4	(Italy) Giacomo Riva	(Italy) DL Racing	2	1	4	3	1	1	Ret	Ret	71
5	(Italy) Filippo Croccolino	(Italy) Best Lap			2	1	4	4	1	4	64
6	(Italy) Giovanni Anapoli	(Italy) Invictus Corse	5	5	5	5	3	3	2	2	52
6	(Italy) Edoardo Barbolini	(Italy) Invictus Corse	5	5	5	5	3	3	2	2	52
6	(Colombia) Andres Mendez	(Italy) Invictus Corse	5	5	5	5	3	3	2	2	52
7	(Italy) Maurizio Fondi	(Slovenia) Lema Racing	4	4	6	6	5	5			26.5
7	(Slovenia) Matej Kosic	(Slovenia) Lema Racing	4	4	6	6	5	5			26.5
Not classified
—N/a	(Italy) Fabio Daminato	(Italy) Reparto Corse RAM			3	4			5	Ret	25
—N/a	(Italy) Giacomo Parisotto	(Italy) Reparto Corse RAM			3	4			5	Ret	25
—N/a	(Italy) Mattia Simonini	(Italy) Reparto Corse RAM			3	4			5	Ret	25
—N/a	(Italy) Vito Postiglione	(Italy) Best Lap	3	2							24
—N/a	(Italy) Gianluca Carboni	(Italy) Best Lap							1	4	22
—N/a	(Italy) Nicolas Risitano	(Italy) Scuderia Ravetto & Ruberti							3	3	20
—N/a	(Republic of Ireland) Lyle Schofield	(Italy) Scuderia Ravetto & Ruberti							3	3	20
—N/a	(Slovenia) Andrej Lah	(Slovenia) Lema Racing	4	4							7
—N/a	(Portugal) Rodrigo Testa	(Italy) DL Racing							Ret	Ret	0

===== Am Drivers' Championship (Division 2) =====
Pos.	Driver	Team	VAL (Italy)		MUG (Italy)		IMO (Italy)		MNZ (Italy)		Points
Pos.	Driver	Team	100	3H	100	3H	100	3H	100	3H	Points
1	(Italy) Andrea Buratti	(Italy) EF Racing	1	1	1	**1**	2	2	2	3	88
1	(Netherlands) Sandra van der Sloot	(Italy) EF Racing	1	1	1	**1**	2	2	2	3	88
2	(Switzerland) Alex Fontana	(Switzerland) Centri Porsche Ticino	3	3	2	2	1	**1**	1	1	84
2	(Slovenia) Matej Knez	(Switzerland) Centri Porsche Ticino	3	3	2	2	1	**1**	1	1	84
Not classified
—N/a	(Germany) Patrick Hofmann	(Switzerland) Centri Porsche Ticino					1	**1**	1	1	56
—N/a	(Italy) Max Busnelli	(Switzerland) Centri Porsche Ticino	2	**2**							27
—N/a	(Switzerland) Ivan Martin Jacoma	(Switzerland) Centri Porsche Ticino	2	**2**							27
—N/a	(Italy) Valerio Presezzi	(Switzerland) Centri Porsche Ticino	2	**2**							27
—N/a	(Italy) Steven Giacon	(Italy) ZRS Motorsport							3	2	23
—N/a	(Italy) Luciano Micale	(Italy) ZRS Motorsport							3	2	23
—N/a	(Italy) Paolo Prestipino	(Italy) ZRS Motorsport							3	2	23
—N/a	(Italy) Stefano Borghi	(Switzerland) Centri Porsche Ticino	3	3							20
—N/a	(Italy) Pierluigi Moscone	(Italy) ZRS Motorsport							4	**Ret**	8
—N/a	(Italy) Luca Rangoni	(Italy) ZRS Motorsport							4	**Ret**	8

=== Constructors' championships ===
Points are awarded only to the highest finishing competitor from each constructor.

==== Scoring system ====
Position	**1st**	**2nd**	**3rd**	**4th**	**5th**	**6th**	**7th**	**8th**	**9th**	**10th**
Points	20	15	12	10	8	6	4	3	2	1

==== GT3 Endurance Constructors' Championship ====
Pos.	Constructor	Car	VAL (Italy)		MUG (Italy)		IMO (Italy)		MNZ (Italy)		Points
Pos.	Constructor	Car	100	3H	100	3H	100	3H	100	3H	Points
1	(Italy) Scuderia Baldini	Ferrari 296 GT3	1	1	11	7	4	4	1	1	80
2	(Italy) Vincenzo Sospiri Racing	Lamborghini Huracán GT3 Evo 2	4	4	3	2	3	3	2	2	76
3	(Italy) BMW Italia Ceccato Racing	BMW M4 GT3	2	3	13	10	2	2	6	4	55.5
4	(Italy) AF Corse	Ferrari 488 GT3 Evo 2020	6	8	1	1	6	6	8	12	49.5
5	(San Marino) Tresor Audi Sport Italia	Audi R8 LMS Evo II	3	2	5	3	11	11	4	16	48
6	(Italy) Nova Race	Honda NSX Acura GT3 Evo	13	13	16	13	1	1	10	7	27
7	(Italy) EF Racing	Porsche 911 GT3 R (992)	7	7	2	20	14	14			18
8	(Italy) Imperiale Racing	Lamborghini Huracán GT3 Evo 2	12	12	10	9	13	13	7	5	14
9	(San Marino) AKM Motorsport	Mercedes-AMG GT3 Evo	5	6	8	19	17	17	Ret	Ret	14
10	(Italy) Auto Sport Racing	Lamborghini Huracán GT3 Evo 2	19	19	18	16	10	10	13	19	3.5
11	(Italy) Tresor Attempto Racing	Mercedes-AMG GT3 Evo					9	9			3
12	(Italy) Lazarus Corse	Aston Martin Vantage AMR GT3	14	14	12	11	Ret	Ret			0
13	(Italy) Double TT Racing	Ferrari 488 GT3 Evo 2020	15	15	15	12	16	15	17	15	0
14	(Italy) Pellin Racing	Ferrari 488 GT3 Evo 2020			19	18					0

==== GT Cup Endurance Constructors' Championships ====
===== Pro-Am (Division 1) =====
Pos.	Constructor	Car	VAL (Italy)		MUG (Italy)		IMO (Italy)		MNZ (Italy)		Points
Pos.	Constructor	Car	100	3H	100	3H	100	3H	100	3H	Points
1	(Italy) Best Lap	Ferrari 488 Challenge Evo	2	2	2	3	2	2	1	1	96.5
2	(Italy) DL Racing	Lamborghini Huracán Super Trofeo Evo 2	1	1	1	1	4	4	3	Ret	84
3	(Italy) Easy Race	Ferrari 488 Challenge Evo	4	4	4	4	1	1	4	Ret	62
4	(Italy) Scuderia Ravetto & Ruberti	Ferrari 488 Challenge Evo	3	3	4	5	3	3			48
5	(Italy) Double TT Racing	Ferrari 488 Challenge Evo							2	2	25

===== Pro-Am (Division 2) =====
Pos.	Constructor	Car	VAL (Italy)		MUG (Italy)		IMO (Italy)		MNZ (Italy)		Points
Pos.	Constructor	Car	100	3H	100	3H	100	3H	100	3H	Points
1	(Italy) Racevent	Porsche 992 GT3 Cup	1	1	1	1	1	1	3	3	106
2	(Italy) Ebimotors	Porsche 992 GT3 Cup	2	2	2	2	2	2	2	2	92.5
3	(Italy) EF Racing	Porsche 992 GT3 Cup							1	1	32

===== Am (Division 1) =====
Pos.	Constructor	Car	VAL (Italy)		MUG (Italy)		IMO (Italy)		MNZ (Italy)		Points
Pos.	Constructor	Car	100	3H	100	3H	100	3H	100	3H	Points
1	(Italy) HC Racing Division	Lamborghini Huracán Super Trofeo Evo 2	1	3	1	2	2	2	4	1	95.5
2	(Italy) Best Lap	Ferrari 488 Challenge Evo	3	2	2	1	4	4	1	4	87
3	(Italy) DL Racing	Lamborghini Huracán Super Trofeo Evo 2	2	1	4	3	1	1	Ret	Ret	71
4	(Italy) Invictus Corse	Lamborghini Huracán Super Trofeo Evo 2	5	5	5	5	3	3	2	2	58
5	(Slovenia) Lema Racing	Lamborghini Huracán Super Trofeo Evo 2	4	4	6	6	5	5			26.5
6	(Italy) Reparto Corse RAM	Ferrari 488 Challenge Evo			3	4			5	Ret	24
7	(Italy) Scuderia Ravetto & Ruberti	Ferrari 488 Challenge Evo							3	3	20

===== Am (Division 2) =====
Pos.	Constructor	Car	VAL (Italy)		MUG (Italy)		IMO (Italy)		MNZ (Italy)		Points
Pos.	Constructor	Car	100	3H	100	3H	100	3H	100	3H	Points
1	(Switzerland) Centri Porsche Ticino	Porsche 992 GT3 Cup	2	2	2	2	1	1	1	1	104
2	(Italy) EF Racing	Porsche 992 GT3 Cup	1	1	1	1	2	2	2	3	103.5
3	(Italy) ZRS Motorsport	Porsche 992 GT3 Cup							3	2	23
