= Aydar Nuriev =

Russian racing driver (born 1994)

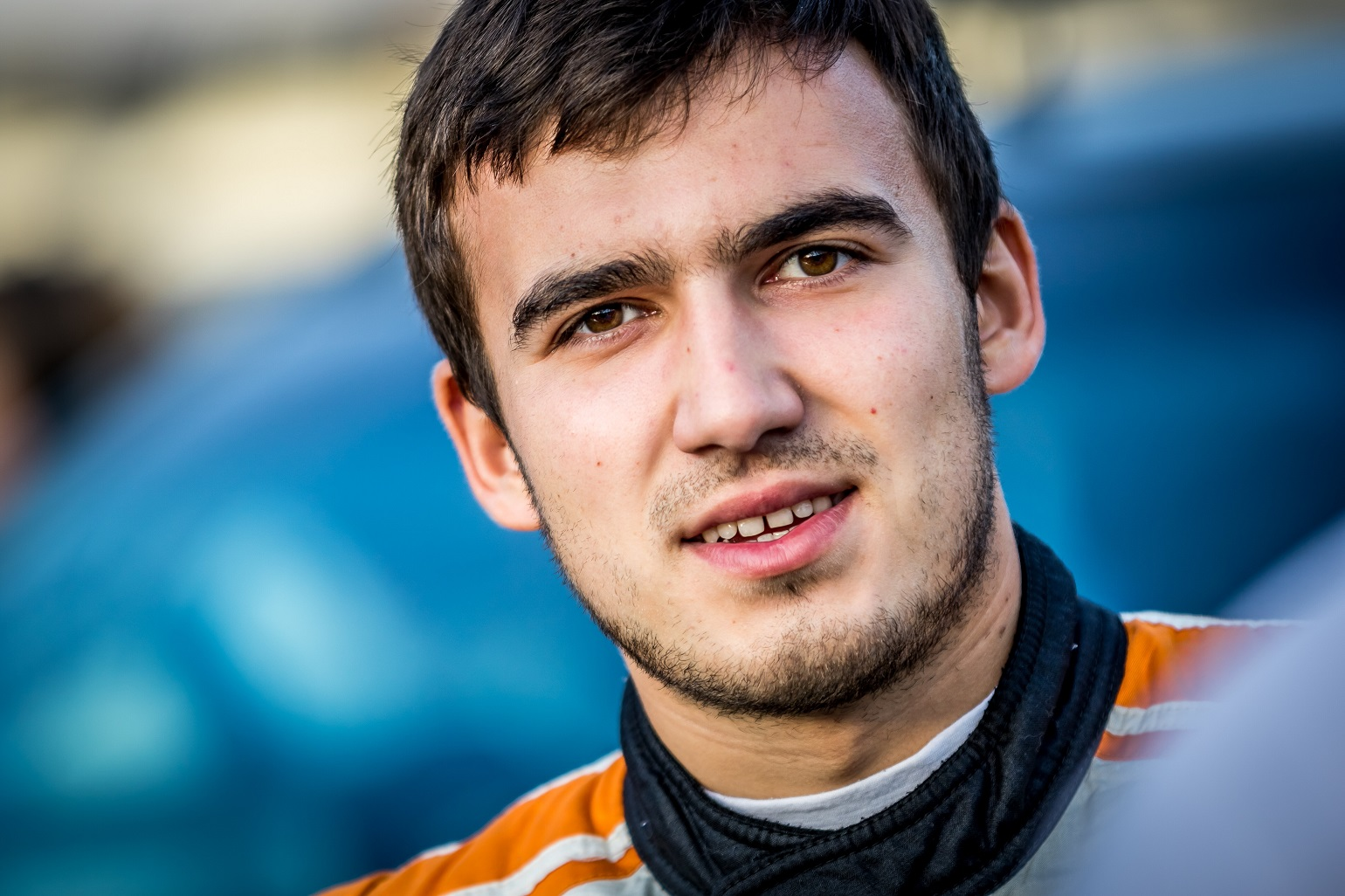
- Nationality: Russian
- Born: Aydar Maratovich Nuriev; 6 December 1994 (age 31) Kazan, Tatarstan, Russian Federation

FIA European Rallycross Championship career
- Debut season: 2018
- Current team: Volland Racing
- Car number: 48
- Starts: 12
- Wins: 5
- Podiums: 8
- Best finish: 1 in 2019

Russian Circuit Racing Series career
- Debut season: 2014
- Current team: RAVON Racing Team
- Car number: 48
- Starts: 55
- Wins: 4
- Podiums: 18
- Best finish: 1st in 2017
- Finished last season: 7th

Aydar Maratovich Nuriev (Russian: Айда́р Мара́тович Нури́ев; born 6 December 1994) is a Russian racing driver of Tatar descent. He was runner up in the 2018 FIA European Rallycross Championship in his debut season and he won the 2019 FIA European Rallycross Championship in only his second year of ERX participation (Super1600 category).

== Racing career ==
Aydar began his career in 2007 in the Tatarstan Karting Championship, also raced in European Autocross Championship, Russian Rallycross Cup and Russian Rallycross Championship, Russian Autocross Cup, Russian Racing Championship, Russian Circuit Racing Series (1st in National class of 2017 season), Russian Winter Ice Racing Cup and Russian Winter Ice Racing Championship, Tatarstan Circuit Racing Championship and Tatarstan Circuit Racing Cup, Tatarstan Winter Ice Racing Cup and Tatarstan Winter Ice Racing Championship, Canyon Cup and Winter Canyon Cup (circuit racing series in Tatarstan).

On 10 March 2019, it was announced that Aydar will drive for Volland Racing for the 2019 FIA European Rallycross Championship season, to race at Audi A1s Super1600. Aydar had a successful start of the season with victory at 2019 Euro RX of Barcelona, and won the championship.

== Racing record ==
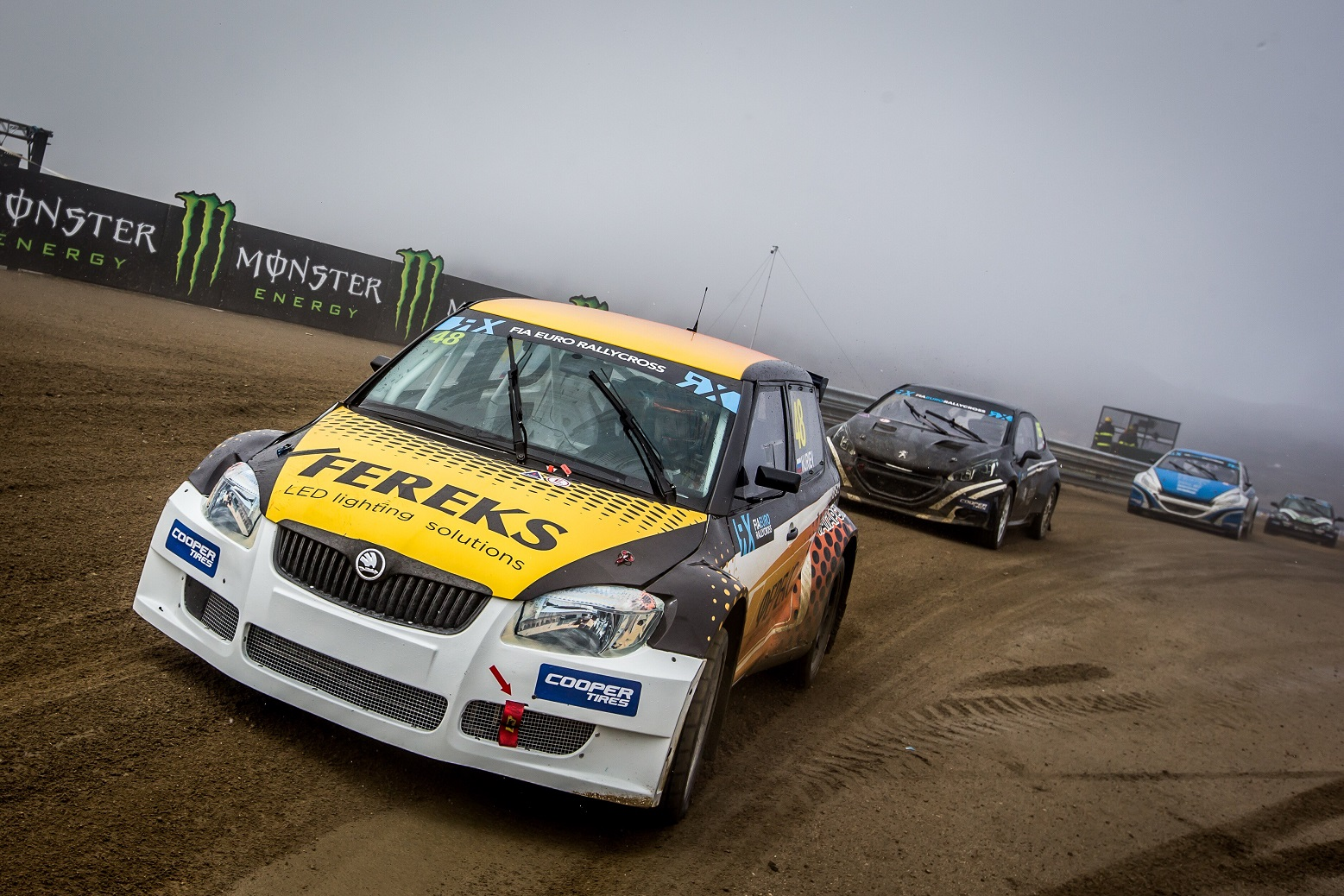
Aydar Nuriev driving a Škoda Fabia in the 2018 Euro RX of Portugal

=== Career summary ===
| Season | Series (Class) | Team (Car) | Races | Wins | Poles | Podiums | Points | Position |
|---|---|---|---|---|---|---|---|---|
| 2007 | Tatarstan Karting Championship | Aydar Nuriev (Go-kart) | N/A | N/A | N/A | N/A | N/A | 1st |
| 2008-11 | Tatarstan Karting Championship | Aydar Nuriev (Go-kart) | N/A | N/A | N/A | N/A | N/A | N/A |
| 2012 | Russian Rallycross Cup (Lada) | Aydar Nuriev (Lada Kalina) | 2 | 0 | N/A | 0 | N/A | 8th |
| 2012 | RRC, Cup of Russia (National) | Aydar Nuriev (Lada Kalina) | 14 | 0 | N/A | 7 | 560 | 4th |
| 2013 | Russian Winter Ice Racing Cup (National) | Aydar Nuriev (Lada Kalina) | 5 | 0 | N/A | 0 | 31,6 | 14th |
| 2013 | Tatarstan Winter Ice Racing Championship (National) | Aydar Nuriev (Lada Kalina) | 3 | 0 | N/A | 0 | N/A | 7th |
| 2013 | Tatarstan Winter Ice Racing Cup (United) | Aydar Nuriev (Lada Kalina) | 2 | 0 | N/A | 0 | N/A | 10th |
| 2013 | Tatarstan Circuit Racing Championship (National) | KAMA-EURO (Lada Kalina) | 8 | 4 | N/A | 7 | N/A | 1st |
| 2013 | RRC, Cup of Russia (National) | Aydar Nuriev (Lada Kalina) | 14 | 2 | 0 | 5 | 466 | 5th |
| 2013 | Russian Rallycross Cup (D2-Lada) | KAMA-EURO (Lada Kalina) | 2 | 0 | N/A | 1 | 121 | 5th |
| 2014 | Tatarstan Karting Championship (KZ2) | Aydar Nuriev (Go-kart) | 2 | 0 | N/A | 0 | 9 | 14th |
| 2014 | Russian Winter Ice Racing Cup (National) | KAMA-EURO (Lada Kalina) | 5 | 0 | N/A | 1 | 86,4 | 5th |
| 2014 | Tatarstan Winter Ice Racing Championship (National) | KAMA-EURO (Lada Kalina) | 3 | 0 | N/A | 0 | N/A | 4th |
| 2014 | Tatarstan Winter Ice Racing Cup (United) | KAMA-EURO (Lada Kalina) | 3 | 1 | N/A | 2 | N/A | 1st |
| 2014 | Russian Autocross Cup (D1) | KAMA-EURO (Ford Focus) | 1 | 1 | N/A | 1 | 60 | 4th |
| 2014 | Russian Rallycross Cup (National, D2-2500) | KAMA-EURO (Lada Kalina) | 3 | 2 | N/A | 2 | 197 | 2nd |
| 2014 | Russian Rallycross Championship (Supercars) | KAMA-EURO (Ford Focus) | 2 | 0 | N/A | 0 | 66 | 9th |
| 2014 | Tatarstan Circuit Racing Championship (National) | Aydar Nuriev (Lada Kalina) | 8 | 4 | N/A | 5 | 546 | 2nd |
| 2014 | Russian Circuit Racing Series, Cup of Russia (National) | Aydar Nuriev (Lada Kalina) | 12 | 0 | N/A | 2 | 543 | 6th |
| 2015 | Russian Winter Ice Racing Cup (National) | Viatti Racing Team (Lada Kalina) | 4 | 0 | N/A | 2 | N/A | 7 |
| 2015 | Tatarstan Winter Ice Racing Championship (National) | Viatti Racing Team (Lada Kalina) | 3 | 0 | N/A | 2 | N/A | 3rd |
| 2015 | Tatarstan Winter Ice Racing Cup (United) | Viatti Racing Team (Lada Kalina) | 3 | 1 | N/A | 3 | N/A | 1st |
| 2015 | Russian Rallycross Cup (National, D2-2500) | Viatti Racing Team (Lada Kalina) | 2 | 1 | N/A | 2 | 44 | 7th |
| 2015 | Russian Rallycross Championship (D1, Superauto) | Viatti Racing Team (Ford Focus) | 1 | 0 | 0 | 0 | 0 | 16th |
| 2015 | Russian Circuit Racing Series, Cup of Russia (National) | TAIFMOTORSPORT (Lada Kalina/Kia Rio) | 14 | 1 | N/A | 5 | 154,5 | 3rd |
| 2016 | Winter Rotax Max Kazan (Rotax Max) | Aydar Nuriev (Go-kart) | 5 | 2 | N/A | 4 | 494 | 2nd |
| 2016 | Russian Winter Ice Racing Championship (National) | Aydar Nuriev (Lada Kalina) | 2 | 1 | N/A | 1 | 178 | 3rd |
| 2016 | Russian Winter Ice Racing Cup (National) | Aydar Nuriev (Lada Kalina) | 4 | 0 | N/A | 0 | 66,6 | 6th |
| 2016 | Tatarstan Winter Ice Racing Championship (National) | Aydar Nuriev (Lada Kalina) | 3 | 0 | N/A | 0 | N/A | 8th |
| 2016 | Tatarstan Winter Ice Racing Cup (United) | Aydar Nuriev (Lada Kalina) | 3 | 1 | N/A | 2 | N/A | 1st |
| 2016 | Russian Circuit Racing Series (Touring Light) | Aydar Nuriev (Lada Kalina) | 2 | 0 | 0 | 0 | 158 | 17th |
| 2016 | Canyon Cup (Lada Granta Sport) | Aydar Nuriev (Lada Granta Sport) | 4 | 3 | N/A | 4 | 70 | 1st |
| 2016 | Tatarstan Circuit Racing Cup (National RF) | NEFIS Racing Division (Lada Kalina) | 2 | 1 | N/A | 1 | 107 | 2nd |
| 2016 | Tatarstan Circuit Racing Cup (National RT) | NEFIS Racing Division (Lada Kalina) | 2 | 2 | N/A | 2 | 61 | 1st |
| 2016 | Tatarstan Circuit Racing Championship (National) | Aydar Nuriev (Lada Kalina) | 8 | 2 | N/A | 5 | 610,4 | 2nd |
| 2016 | Russian Rallycross Championship (National) | Viatti Racing Team (Lada Kalina) | 7 | 1 | N/A | 3 | 133 | 2nd |
| 2016 | Russian Rallycross Cup (Superauto) | Aydar Nuriev (Ford Focus) | 3 | 1 | N/A | 3 | 62 | 2nd |
| 2017 | Winter Rotax Max Kazan (Rotax Max) | Aydar Nuriev (Go-kart) | 1 | 0 | N/A | 0 | 57 | 25th |
| 2017 | Winter Canyon Cup (Lada Granta Sport) | Aydar Nuriev (Lada Granta Sport) | 2 | 0 | N/A | 2 | 67 | 3rd |
| 2017 | Russian Winter Ice Racing Championship (N-1600) | FEREKS Racing Team (Lada Kalina) | 4 | 1 | N/A | 3 | 289,4 | 2nd |
| 2017 | Russian Winter Ice Racing Cup (National) | FEREKS Racing Team (Lada Kalina) | 1 | 0 | N/A | 0 | 8 | 18th |
| 2017 | Tatarstan Winter Ice Racing Championship (A-1600) | FEREKS Racing Team (Lada Kalina) | 2 | 1 | N/A | 1 | N/A | 2nd |
| 2017 | Russian Rallycross Championship (National) | FEREKS Racing Team (Lada Kalina) | 2 | 0 | N/A | 1 | 46 | 10th |
| 2017 | Russian Rallycross Championship (Superauto) | FEREKS Racing Team (Ford Focus) | 2 | 0 | N/A | 1 | 41 | 5th |
| 2017 | Tatarstan Circuit Racing Championship (National) | FEREKS Racing Team (Kia Rio) | 8 | 4 | N/A | 7 | N/A | 1st |
| 2017 | Russian Circuit Racing Series, Cup of Russia (National) | FEREKS Racing Team (Kia Rio) | 14 | 2 | N/A | 8 | 201 | 1st |
| 2017 | FIA European Autocross Championship (TouringAutocross) | (Renault Clio) | 1 | 0 | 1 | 0 | 24 | 12 |
| 2018 | Winter Canyon Cup (Lada Granta Sport) | Aydar Nuriev (Lada Granta Sport) | N/A | N/A | N/A | N/A | 128 | 4th |
| 2018 | Russian Winter Ice Racing Championship (N-1600) | FEREKS Racing Team (Kia Rio) | 3 | 1 | N/A | 2 | 210,2 | 5th |
| 2018 | Tatarstan Winter Ice Racing Championship (A-1600) | FEREKS Racing Team (Kia Rio) | N/A | N/A | N/A | N/A | N/A | 1st |
| 2018 | FIA European Rallycross Championship (S1600) | Volland Racing (Skoda Fabia) | 6 | 2 | 2 | 4 | 138 | 2nd |
| 2018 | Russian Rallycross Championship (National) | FEREKS Racing Team (Lada Kalina) | 2 | 1 | N/A | 2 | 56 | 8th |
| 2018 | Tatarstan Circuit Racing Championship (National) | FEREKS Racing Team (Kia Rio) | 4 | 2 | N/A | 2 | 381,5 | 4th |
| 2018 | Russian Circuit Racing Series, Cup of Russia (National) | BRAGIN Racing Team (Lada Kalina)/AG Team (Kia Rio) | 4 | 0 | 0 | 0 | 31 | 18th |
| 2019 | Russian Winter Ice Racing Championship (N-1600) | FEREKS Racing Team (Kia Rio) | 3 | 0 | N/A | 1 | 210,2 | 5th |
| 2019 | Tatarstan Winter Ice Racing Championship (N-1600) | FEREKS Racing Team (Kia Rio) | 2 | 0 | N/A | 1 | 78 | 4th |
| 2019 | Winter Canyon Cup (Lada Granta Sport) | Aydar Nuriev (Lada Granta Sport) | N/A | N/A | N/A | N/A | 41 | 13th |
| 2019 | FIA European Rallycross Championship (S1600) | Volland Racing (Audi A1) | 6 | 3 | 5 | 4 | 156 | 1st |
| 2019 | Russian Circuit Racing Series, Championat of Russia (Touring-Light) | RAVON Racing Team (Ravon Nexia R3) | 9 | 1 | 0 | 3 | 92 | 7th |
| Season | Series (Class) | Team (Car) | Races | Wins | Poles | Podiums | Points | Position |

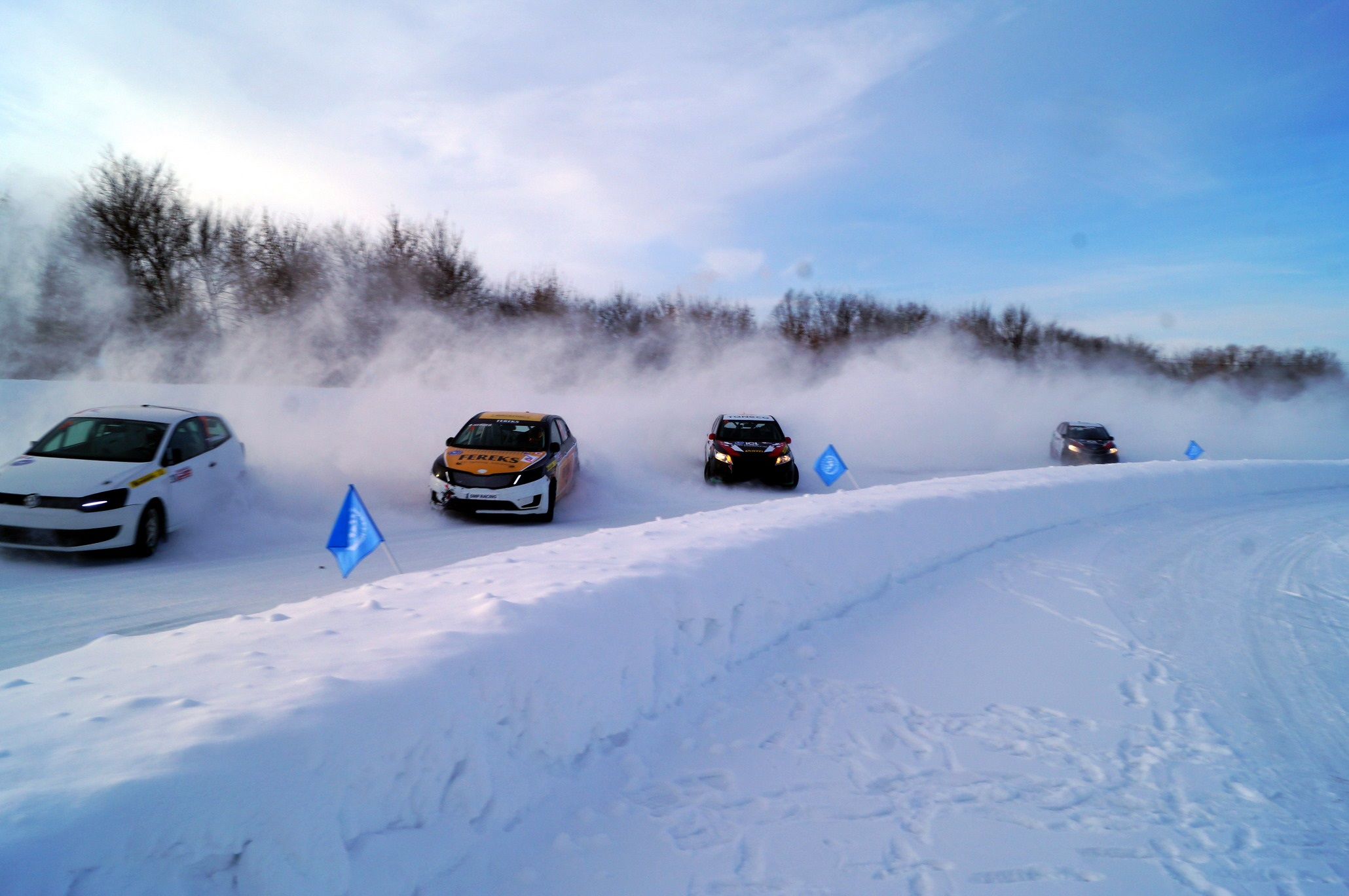
2019 Russian Winter Ice Racing Championship, Aydar Nuriev (2nd) fighting for position

=== Complete Russian Racing Championship results ===
(key) (Races in bold indicate pole position) (Races in italics indicate fastest lap)

==== National ====
| Year | Entrant | Car | 1 | 2 | 3 | 4 | 5 | 6 | 7 | 8 | 9 | 10 | 11 | 12 | 13 | 14 | 15 | 16 | Rank | Points |
|---|---|---|---|---|---|---|---|---|---|---|---|---|---|---|---|---|---|---|---|---|
| 2012 | Aydar Nuriev | Lada Kalina | SMO; 1 | SMO; 2 | KAZ; 1; 4 | KAZ; 2; 8 | NRG; 1; 2 | NRG; 2; 2 | ADM; 1 Ret | ADM; 2; 3 | MRW; 1; 3 | MRW; 2; 3 | SMO; 1; 4 | SMO; 2; 6 | NRG; 1; 2 | NRG; 2; 2 | SMO; 1; 5 | SMO; 2; 2 | 4th | 560 |
| 2013 | Aydar Nuriev | Lada Kalina | NRG; 1; 4 | NRG; 2; 2 | MRW; 1; 1 | MRW; 2 Ret | SMO; 1; 4 | SMO; 2; 4 | KAZ; 1; 3 | KAZ; 2; 1 | KAZ; 1; 4 | KAZ; 2; 5 | SMO; 1 Ret | SMO; 2; 10 | NRG; 1; 3 | NRG; 2; 8 | TOL 1* | | 5th | 466 |

^{*} — Race results have been canceled.

=== Complete Russian Circuit Racing Series results ===
(key) (Races in bold indicate pole position) (Races in italics indicate fastest lap)

==== National ====
| Year | Entrant | Car | 1 | 2 | 3 | 4 | 5 | 6 | 7 | 8 | 9 | 10 | 11 | 12 | 13 | 14 | 15 | 16 | Rank | Points |
|---|---|---|---|---|---|---|---|---|---|---|---|---|---|---|---|---|---|---|---|---|
| 2014 | Aydar Nuriev | Lada Kalina | SMO; 1 | SMO; 2 | MRW; 1; 4 | MRW; 2; 3 | NRG; 1; 6 | NRG; 2 Ret | KAZ; 1; 20 | KAZ; 2; 4 | KAZ; 1; 7 | KAZ; 2; 14 | SMO; 1; 4 | SMO; 2; 2 | SOC; 1 Ret | SOC; 2; 14 | SMO; 1 | SMO; 2 | 6th | 543 |
| 2015 | TAIFMOTORSPORT | Lada Kalina | NRG; 1; 3 | NRG; 2; 5 | SMO; 1; 7 | SMO; 2; 2 | SOC; 1; 5 | SOC; 2 Ret | KAZ; 1; 4 | KAZ; 2; 13 | SMO; 1 Ret | SMO; 2; 4 | | | KAZ; 1; 3 | KAZ; 2; 10 | | | 3rd | 154,5 |
| 2015 | TAIFMOTORSPORT | Kia Rio | | | | | | | | | | | MRW; 1; **1** | MRW; 2; 2 | | | | | 3rd | 154,5 |
| 2017 | FEREKS Racing Team | Kia Rio | GRO; 1; 1 | GRO; 2; 2 | SMO; 1; 3 | SMO; 2; 1 | NRG; 1; 5 | NRG; 2; 2 | KAZ; 1; 7 | KAZ; 2; 3 | SMO; 1; 2 | SMO; 2; 5 | MRW; 1 Ret | MRW; 2; 8 | KAZ; 1; **2** | KAZ; 2; 16 | | | 1st | 201 |
| 2018 | BRAGIN Racing Team | Lada Kalina | GRO; 1 | GRO; 2 | SMO; 1 | SMO; 2 | NRG; 1 Ret | NRG; 2; 7 | KAZ; 1 | KAZ; 2 | MRW; 1 | MRW; 2 | SOC; 1 | SOC; 2 | | | | | 18th | 31 |
| 2018 | AG Team | Kia Rio | | | | | | | | | | | | | GRO; 1; 7 | GRO; 2; 4 | | | 18th | 31 |

==== Touring-Light ====
| Year | Entrant | Car | 1 | 2 | 3 | 4 | 5 | 6 | 7 | 8 | 9 | 10 | 11 | 12 | 13 | 14 | Rank | Points |
|---|---|---|---|---|---|---|---|---|---|---|---|---|---|---|---|---|---|---|
| 2016 | Aydar Nuriev | Kia Rio | SMO; 1 | SMO; 2 | NRG; 1 | NRG; 2 | GRO; 1 | GRO; 2 | SOC; 1 | SOC; 2 | MRW; 1 | MRW; 2 | SMO; 1 | SMO; 2 | KAZ; 1; 7 | KAZ; 2; 4 | 17th | 158 |
| 2019 | RAVON Racing Team | Ravon Nexia R3 | GRO; 1; 2 | GRO; 2; 8 | NRG; 1 Ret | NRG; 2 DNS | SMO; 1; 6 | SMO; 2 Ret | KAZ; 1 DNS | KAZ; 2 DNS | ADM; 1; 2 | ADM; 2; 1 | MRW; 1 | MRW; 2 | SOC; 1 Ret | SOC; 2; 8 | 7th | 92 |

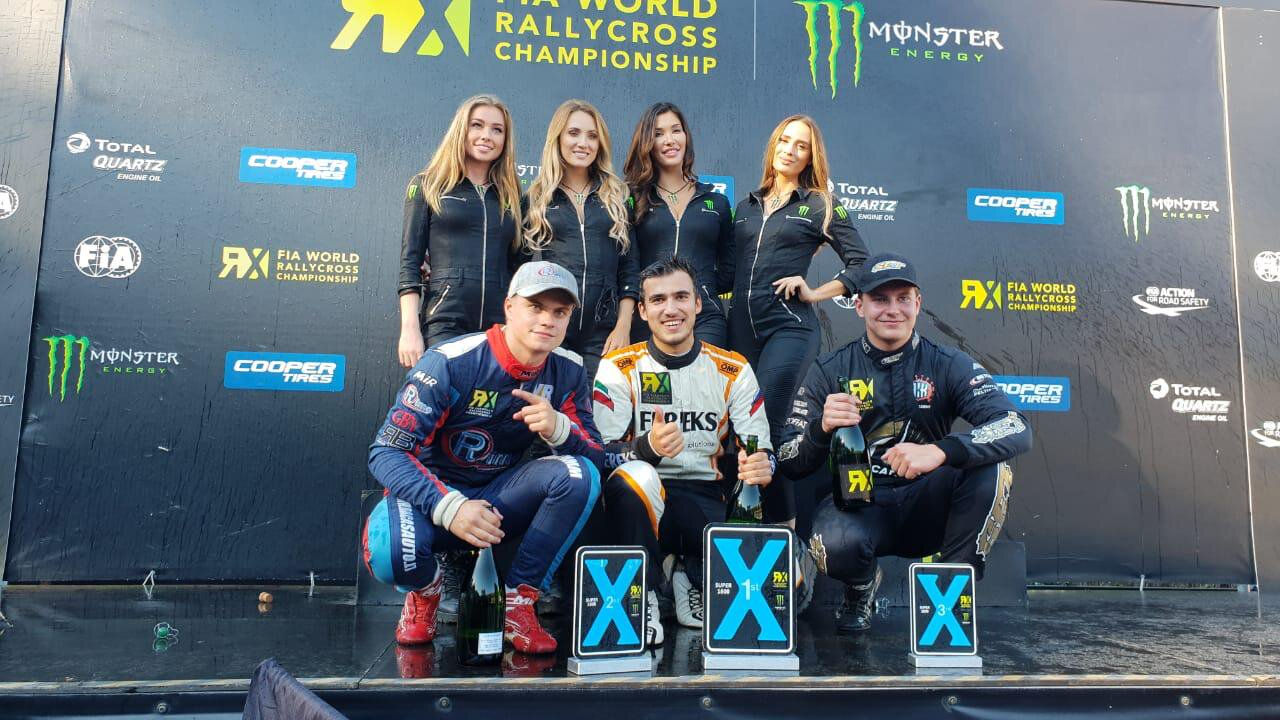
Aydar Nuriev (center) won the 2018 Euro RX of Germany (Super1600)

=== Complete FIA European Rallycross Championship results ===
(key)

==== Super1600 ====
| Year | Entrant | Car | 1 | 2 | 3 | 4 | 5 | 6 | ERX | Points |
|---|---|---|---|---|---|---|---|---|---|---|
| 2018 | Volland Racing | Skoda Fabia | BAR; 8 | POR; 9 | NOR; 2 | FRA; 1 | LAT; 2 | GER; 1 | 2nd | 138 |
| 2019 | Volland Racing | Audi A1s | BAR; 1 | BEL; 1 | SWE; 2 | GER; 4 | FRA; 1 | LAT; 11 | 1st | 156 |
