= Timur Shigabutdinov =

Russian racing driver

- Nationality: Russian
- Born: Timur Albertovich Shigabutdinov; 12 January 1983 (age 43) Kazan, Tatar ASSR, Russian SFSR, Soviet Union

FIA European Rallycross Championship career
- Debut season: 2012
- Current team: Volland Racing
- Car number: 89
- Former teams: STK Namus, SET Promotion
- Starts: 59
- Wins: 1
- Podiums: 7
- Best finish: 3rd in 2016
- Finished last season: 6th

Russian Circuit Racing Series career
- Debut season: 2014
- Current team: TAIF Motorsport
- Car number: 89
- Starts: 36
- Podiums: 1
- Best finish: 14th in 2017
- Finished last season: 18th

Timur Albertovich Shigabutdinov (Russian: Тиму́р Альбе́ртович Шигабутди́нов) (born 12 January 1983) is a Russian racing driver, currently competing in the FIA European Rallycross Championship, Russian Circuit Racing Series and in the Can-Am X Race. In 2016, he finishing third in the standings at the FIA European Rallycross Championship (Super1600 category).

== Racing career ==
Timur began his career in 2002 in the Russian Autocross Championship and Russian Autocross Cup, also raced in Russian Rallycross Cup and Russian Rallycross Championship, FIA European Rallycross Championship, FIA North European Zone Championship, Russian Racing Championship, Russian Circuit Racing Series, Russian Winter Ice Racing Cup and Russian Winter Ice Racing Championship, Tatarstan Circuit Racing Championship, Tatarstan Winter Ice Racing Cup and Tatarstan Winter Ice Racing Championship.

On 10 March 2019, it was announced that Timur will drive for Volland Racing for the 2019 FIA European Rallycross Championship season, to race at Audi A1s Super1600. Also he compete in the Russian Circuit Racing Series and Can-Am X Race with the TAIF Motorsport.

== Racing record ==
=== Complete FIA European Rallycross Championship results ===
(key)

==== Super1600 ====
Year	Entrant	Car	1	2	3	4	5	6	7	8	9	10	ERX	Points
2012	STK Namus	Renault Clio Mk2	GBR; 11	FRA; 12	AUT; 11	HUN (19)	NOR; 7	SWE (20)	BEL; 14	NED; 4	FIN; 13	GER; 10	9th	54
2013	STK Namus	Renault Twingo Mk2	GBR; 4	POR; 10	HUN; 12	FIN; 4	NOR; 7	SWE; 15	FRA; 11	AUT; 10	GER; 2		5th	117
2014	SET Promotion	Renault Twingo Mk2	POR; 5	GBR; 9	NOR; 6	FIN; 7	SWE; 15	BEL; 2	FRA; 8	GER; 20	ITA; 13		6th	107
2015	SET Promotion	Renault Clio Mk2	POR; 7	BEL; 5	GER; 2	SWE; 14	FRA; 3	BAR; 14	ITA; 2				6th	109
2016	SET Promotion	Renault Twingo Mk2	POR; 3	GBR; 6	SWE; 5	FRA; 17	BAR; 5	GER; 9					3rd	87
2017	SET Promotion	Renault Twingo Mk2	POR; 5	BEL; 4	SWE; 4	FRA; 8	LAT; 9	GER; 12					7th	88
2018	SET Promotion	Renault Twingo Mk2	BAR; 16	POR; 13	NOR; 24	FRA; 11	LAT; 23	GER; 4					15th	21*
2019	Volland Racing	Audi A1s	BAR; 4	BEL; 8	SWE; 4	GER; 11	FRA; 10	LAT; 1					6th	90

^{*} -15 championship points / Stewards decision - "Use of 3rd engine - taking in use more than 2 sealed engines in the championship".

=== Complete Russian Racing Championship results ===
(key) (Races in bold indicate pole position) (Races in italics indicate fastest lap)

==== National ====
Year	Entrant	Car	1	2	3	4	5	6	7	8	9	10	11	12	13	14	15	Rank	Points
2013	STK MX Autosport	Lada Kalina	NRG; 1; 10	NRG; 2; 8	MRW; 1	MRW; 2	SMO; 1	SMO; 2	KAZ; 1; 2	KAZ; 2 Ret	KAZ; 1; 7	KAZ; 2; 6	SMO; 1	SMO; 2	NRG; 1	NRG; 2	TOL	11th	174

=== Complete Russian Circuit Racing Series results ===
(key) (Races in bold indicate pole position) (Races in italics indicate fastest lap)

==== National ====
Year	Entrant	Car	1	2	3	4	5	6	7	8	9	10	11	12	13	14	15	16	Rank	Points
2014	STK MX Autosport	Lada Kalina	SMO; 1	SMO; 2	MRW; 1; 10	MRW; 2; 7	NRG; 1 Ret	NRG; 2; 4	KAZ; 1	KAZ; 2	KAZ; 1; 2	KAZ; 2 Ret	SMO; 1	SMO; 2	SOC; 1	SOC; 2	SMO; 1	SMO; 2	16th	243
2015	TAIF Motorsport	Lada Kalina	NRG; 1; 3	NRG; 2; 5	SMO; 1; 7	SMO; 2; 2	SOC; 1; 5	SOC; 2 Ret	KAZ; 1; 6	KAZ; 2 Ret	SMO; 1	SMO; 2	MRW; 1	MRW; 2	KAZ; 1	KAZ; 2			18rd	8

==== Touring ====
Year	Entrant	Car	1	2	3	4	5	6	7	8	9	10	11	12	13	14	Rank	Points
2017	TAIF Motorsport	Audi RS3 LMS TCR	GRO; 1	GRO; 2	SMO; 1; 10	SMO; 2; 9	NRG; 1; 13	NRG; 2; 10	KAZ; 1	KAZ; 2	SMO; 1 Ret	SMO; 2; 7	MRW; 1; 11	MRW; 2; 10	KAZ; 1; 10	KAZ; 2; 6	14th	58
2018	TAIF Motorsport	Audi RS3 LMS TCR	GRO; 1	GRO; 2	SMO; 1 Ret	SMO; 2; 13	NRG; 1; 14	NRG; 2; 11	KAZ; 1; 12	KAZ; 2; 9	MRW; 1 Ret	MRW; 2; 17	SOC; 1	SOC; 2	GRO; 1	GRO; 2	18th	21
2019	TAIF Motorsport	Audi RS3 LMS TCR	GRO; 1; 20	GRO; 2; 15	NRG; 1; 6	NRG; 2 Ret	SMO; 1; 12	SMO; 2; 14	KAZ; 1 Ret	KAZ; 2 Ret	ADM; 1; 15	ADM; 2; 10	MRW; 1	MRW; 2	SOC; 1	SOC; 2	18th	24
