= 2015 Russian Circuit Racing Series =

Motor racing season

Seasons
- ← 2014 2016 →

The 2015 Russian Circuit Racing Series season was the second season of the Russian Circuit Racing Series, organized by SMP Racing. It was the first season with TCR class cars, competing alongside the Super 2000 TC2 and the Super Production cars. It is also included Touring Light, National and Junior's championships, with all of them have their own races during the RCRS weekends. Aleksey Dudukalo won the drivers' championship, driving a SEAT Leon Cup Racer, and Lukoil Racing Team won the teams' championship.

== Teams and drivers ==
All teams and drivers were Russian-registered, excepting Mika Salo, who raced under Finnish Racing license.

=== Touring Absolute (United S2000) ===
Team	Car	No.	Drivers	Rounds
Touring
Lukoil Racing Team	SEAT Leon Cup Racer	2	Aleksey Dudukalo	All
Lukoil Racing Team	SEAT Leon Cup Racer	4	Roman Golikov	All
Lukoil Racing Team	SEAT Leon Cup Racer	7	Rustam Akiniyazov	All
AMG Motorsport	BMW 320i	11	Anton Badoev	All
AMG Motorsport	BMW 320si	27	Vitaly Larionov	All
Ralf-Car Team	Renault Megane RS	22	Andrey Artyushin	6–7
Super Production
Ralf-Car Team	Renault Clio RS	22	Andrey Artyushin	2–3
Shalunov Racing	Lada Granta	33	Sergey Shalunov	4, 6
Neva Motorsport	Honda Civic	37	Pavel Yashin	All
Neva Motorsport	Honda Civic	42	Aleksey Belogolov	2, 5
Yushin Racing	Honda Civic	38	Andrey Yushin	All
Innocenti Lada Sport	Lada Granta	43	Vladislav Nezvankin	All
Innocenti Lada Sport	Lada Granta	47	Lev Tolkachev	All
Innocenti Lada Sport	Lada Granta	48	Vitaly Primak	4
Podmoskovie Motorsport	Honda Civic	44	Vladislav Kubasov	2, 6
ZAO TD Kurganskie Pritsepy	Lada Granta	45	Aleksandr Tupitsyn	All
Zagumennov Racing	Lada Granta	51	Sergey Zagumennov	2–6
Zagumennov Racing	Lada Granta	73	Sergey Zagumennov	7
Subaru Russia	Subaru BRZ	46	Efim Gantmacher	6–7
Subaru Russia	Subaru BRZ	52	Maksim Chernev	All
Subaru Russia	Subaru BRZ	55	Vadim Meshcheryakov	6
Subaru Russia	Subaru BRZ	56	Sergey Pluzhnov	7
Balashihinskaya UC DOSAAF Russia	Honda Civic	54	Denis Kachalkov	7
Syzran Racing Team	Lada Granta	63	Maksim Simonov	All

=== Touring Light ===
Team	Car	No.	Driver	Rounds
SK «Suvar-Motorsport»	Renault Twingo Sport	2	Ildar Rakhmatullin	All
SK «Suvar-Motorsport»	Renault Twingo Sport	11	Ilsur Akhmetvaleev	1,3–4,6–7
SK «Suvar-Motorsport»	Volkswagen Polo R2 Mk5	11	Ilsur Akhmetvaleev	5
B-Tuning	Volkswagen Polo R2 Mk5	3	Andrey Nikolaev	All
B-Tuning	Volkswagen Polo R2 Mk5	10	Sergey Ryabov	3–4
B-Tuning	Volkswagen Polo R2 Mk5	83	Andrey Sevastyanov	All
Lada Sport Rosneft	Lada Kalina NFR	4	Dmitry Bragin	All
Lada Sport Rosneft	Lada Kalina NFR	30	Mikhail Mityaev	All
Zenit Motorsport	Ford Fiesta Mk6	5	Maksim Belotskiy	6–7
Zenit Motorsport	Ford Fiesta Mk5	5	Maksim Belotskiy	4–5
Zenit Motorsport	Ford Fiesta Mk5	21	Pavel Sorochinskiy	1
Zenit Motorsport	Ford Fiesta Mk5	44	Sergey Koronatov	All
PSM-Team80	Kia Rio R2B	7	Aleksandr Salnikov	1–2,4
PSM-Team80	Kia Rio R2B	12	Nikolay Karamyshev	1–2
PSM-Team80	Kia Rio R2B	24	Vasily Krichevskiy	4
Podmoskovye Motorsport	Volkswagen Polo R2 Mk5	17	Vladimir Cherevan	1–5
Podmoskovye Motorsport	SEAT Ibiza Mk4	17	Vladimir Cherevan	6–7
Podmoskovye Motorsport	Ford Fiesta Mk5	43	Andrey Maslennikov	All
Orenburg Racing	Kia Rio R2B	19	Rodion Shushakov	7
Orenburg Racing	Kia Rio R2B	27	Andrey Radoshnov	All

=== National ===
Team	Car	No.	Driver	Rounds
B-Tuning	Volkswagen Polo	1	Mika Salo	7
B-Tuning	Volkswagen Polo	24	Igor Samsonov	All
B-Tuning	Volkswagen Polo	25	Anton Zakharov	3–7
B-Tuning	Volkswagen Polo	42	Maksim Bronin	1
B-Tuning	VAZ-2101	77	Mikhail Zasadych	1–2,5–6
Lada Sport	Lada Kalina	2	Andrey Petukhov	4–7
Lada Sport	Lada Kalina	5	Aleksandr Samokhvalov	4
Lada Sport	Lada Kalina	6	Mikhail Mityaev	4
Lada Sport	Lada Kalina	7	Sergey Pluzhnov	4
Lada Sport	Lada Kalina	8	Pavel Aleshin	5
Lada Sport	Lada Kalina	9	Yury Arshanskiy	5
Lada Sport	Lada Kalina	17	Vitaly Primak	1–4,6–7
Lada Sport	Lada Kalina	21	Pavel Kalmanovich	All
Spets-Avtoplast Motor Sport	Lada Kalina	20	Egor Sanin	1–3,5,7
Spets-Avtoplast Motor Sport	Lada Kalina	3	Roman Agoshkov	1–5
Spets-Avtoplast Motor Sport	Kia Rio	3	Roman Agoshkov	6–7
STK «Taifmotorsport»	Lada Kalina	4	Dmitry Bragin	All
STK «Taifmotorsport»	Lada Kalina	87	Marat Sharapov	1,4
STK «Taifmotorsport»	Lada Kalina	89	Timur Shigabutdinov	4
STK «Taifmotorsport»	Lada Kalina	48	Aydar Nuriev	1–5,7
STK «Taifmotorsport»	Kia Rio	48	Aydar Nuriev	6
SMP Racing Russian Bears	Lada Kalina	10	Mikhail Maleev	1–3
SMP Racing Russian Bears	Lada Kalina	91	Bulat Fatkhullin	1–4,7
PSM-Team80	Kia Rio	11	Rafael Fattakhov	3
Almax Racing	Lada Kalina	19	Vladimir Sheshenin	All
Almax Racing	Lada Kalina	50	Aleksandr Marushko	All
Bauman Motorsport	Lada Kalina II	26	Ivan Lyagusha	1–3,6
Azarenkov A.	Lada Kalina	27	Aleksandr Azarenkov	4,6–7
Goltsova Racing	Lada Kalina	37	Natalya Goltsova	All
Goltsova Racing	Lada Kalina II	46	Efim Gantmakher	All
Parus	Lada Kalina	43	Igor Alekseev	7
Parus	Lada Kalina	56	Vasily Korablev	1–2,4–5,7
Parus	Lada Kalina	59	Anatoly Korablev	7
ZAO TD Kurganskie pritsepy	Lada Kalina	45	Aleksandr Tupitsyn	5
Syzran Racing Team	Lada Kalina	53	Vyacheslav Staroverov	All
Syzran Racing Team	Lada Kalina	63	Maksim Simonov	All
Sergey Drebenets	Lada Kalina	57	Sergey Drebenets	1–2,5–6
SK «Timerkhanн»	Kia Rio	73	Rais Minnikhanov	4
STK «Chingizkhan»	Lada Kalina	76	Irek Minnakhmetov	4
Sharafiev E.	Lada Kalina	82	Eduard Sharafiev	4
Golovanov A.	Lada Kalina	84	Aleksandr Golovanov	All
Gaynullin A.	Lada Kalina	85	Albert Gaynullin	All
RHHCC Racing Team	Volkswagen Polo	95	Aleksandr Garmash	3
RHHCC Racing Team	Lada Kalina	95	Aleksandr Garmash	1–3,5–7
RHHCC Racing Team	Lada Kalina	96	Dmitry Karnaukhov	1–3,5,7
Todua O.	Lada Kalina	97	Oleg Todua	4

=== Junior ===
Team	Car	No.	Driver	Rounds
B-Tuning	Volkswagen Polo	25	Gleb Kuznetsov	All
Shin I.	Lada Kalina	38	Aleksey Shin	1,4–5,7
Strukov S.	Lada Kalina	46	Yuliya Strukova	All
Golovanov G.	Lada Kalina	84	Sergey Golovanov	All
Gusev A.	Lada Kalina	90	Vladimir Gusev	1,4,7

== Calendar and results ==
The 2015 calendar consists in seven rounds, with all events scheduled to be held in Russia. The fifth round was scheduled to be held in Autodrom Moscow, but it was later moved to Smolensk Ring. The seventh round was scheduled to be held in Sochi Autodrom, but it was later moved to Kazan Ring.

Rnd.	Race	Circuit	Date	Touring winner	SP winner	TL winner	National winner	Junior winner
1	1	NRING Circuit, Bogorodsk	16 May	Vitaly Larionov	Vladislav Nezvankin	Dmitry Bragin	Dmitry Bragin	Gleb Kuznetsov
1	2	NRING Circuit, Bogorodsk	17 May	Aleksey Dudukalo	Andrey Yushin	Mikhail Mityaev	Dmitry Bragin	Gleb Kuznetsov
2	3	Smolensk Ring, Smolensk	30 May	Aleksey Dudukalo	Maksim Chernev	Andrey Sevastyanov	Pavel Kalmanovich	Gleb Kuznetsov
2	4	Smolensk Ring, Smolensk	31 May	Aleksey Dudukalo	Lev Tolkachev	Andrey Maslennikov	Egor Sanin	Gleb Kuznetsov
3	5	Sochi Autodrom, Sochi	20 June	Aleksey Dudukalo	Maksim Chernev	Ildar Rakhmatullin	Roman Agoshkov	
3	6	Sochi Autodrom, Sochi	21 June	Roman Golikov	Maksim Chernev	Andrey Radoshnov	Dmitry Bragin	
4	7	Kazan Ring, Kazan	11 July	Rustam Akiniyazov	Maksim Simonov	Dmitry Bragin	Vladimir Sheshenin	Yuliya Strukova
4	8	Kazan Ring, Kazan	12 July	Aleksey Dudukalo	Maksim Chernev	Dmitry Bragin	Albert Gaynullin	Yuliya Strukova
5	9	Smolensk Ring, Smolensk	1 August	Aleksey Dudukalo	Maksim Chernev	Dmitry Bragin	Dmitry Bragin	Gleb Kuznetsov
5	10	Smolensk Ring, Smolensk	2 August	Aleksey Dudukalo	Andrey Yushin	Mikhail Mityaev	Albert Gaynullin	Sergey Golovanov
6	11	Moscow Raceway, Volokolamsk	5 September	Aleksey Dudukalo	Maksim Simonov	Dmitry Bragin	Aydar Nuriev	
6	12	Moscow Raceway, Volokolamsk	6 September	Aleksey Dudukalo	Maksim Chernev	Andrey Maslennikov	Pavel Kalmanovich	
7	13	Kazan Ring, Kazan	19 September	Roman Golikov	Vladislav Nezvankin	Ildar Rakhmatullin	Roman Agoshkov	Gleb Kuznetsov
7	14	Kazan Ring, Kazan	20 September	Rustam Akiniyazov	Maksim Chernev	Mikhail Mityaev	Roman Agoshkov	Gleb Kuznetsov

== Championship standings ==
Scoring system

Position	1st	2nd	3rd	4th	5th	6th	7th	8th	9th	10th	Pole	FL
Points Round 1–6	25	18	15	12	10	8	6	4	2	1	1	1
Points Round 7	37,5	27	22,5	18	15	12	9	6	3	1,5	1,5	1,5

=== Touring and Super Production ===
Pos.	Driver	NIZ		SMO		SOC		KAZ		SMO		MSC		KAZ		Pts.
Touring
1	Aleksey Dudukalo	**3**	1	1	**1**	**1**	**2**	2	1	1	**1**	**1**	**1**	**3**	3	337
2	Roman Golikov	8	2	2	3	4	1	3	4	4	Ret	3	3	1	**2**	225,5
3	Rustam Akiniyazov	7	Ret	**3**	2	3	Ret	**1**	**2**	3	DSQ	4	4	2	1	202,5
4	Vitaly Larionov	1	3	4	4	2	3	Ret	3	**2**	Ret	2	2	Ret	4	188.5
5	Anton Badoev	Ret	Ret	7	5	5	4	4	5	5	3	Ret	5	4	5	128
6	Andrey Artyushin			Ret	14	10	11					7	Ret	13	13	7
Super Production
1	Maksim Chernev	5	5	5	11	**6**	5	10	6	6	NC	**8**	6	9	6	194.5
2	Andrey Yushin	9	4	9	8	Ret	Ret	**11**	8	7	2	12	9	**7**	12	124.5
3	Vladislav Nezvankin	2	Ret	**6**	7	7	9	8	Ret	Ret	4	Ret	14	5	11	115.5
4	Maksim Simonov	**4**	8	Ret	12	8	8	5	7	8	DSQ	5	15	10	14†	114.5
5	Lev Tolkachev	6	Ret	10	6	9	6	7	DSQ	9	Ret	13	13	6	9	105
6	Pavel Yashin	10	6	8	15	Ret	10	Ret	11	9	5	11	7	14†	8	97
7	Efim Gantmacher											10	11	8	7	63
8	Aleksander Tupitsyn	11	7	11	10	Ret	Ret	9	9	11	6	14	12	Ret	Ret	56
9	Sergey Shalunov							6	Ret			6	10			37
10	Sergey Zagumennov			Ret	9	DNS	7	Ret	Ret	DNS	Ret	Ret	8	Ret	Ret	28.5
11	Denis Kachalkov													11	10	24
12	Vadim Mesheryakov											9	16			12
13	Vitaly Primak							DNS	10							10
14	Sergey Pluzhnov													12	DNS	6
15	Aleksey Belogolov			WD	WD					Ret	7					5
16	Vladislav Kubasov			Ret	13							DNS	Ret			2
Pos.	Driver	NIZ		SMO		SOC		KAZ		SMO		MSC		KAZ		Pts.

Colour	Result
Gold	Winner
Silver	Second place
Bronze	Third place
Green	Points classification
Blue	Non-points classification
Blue	Non-classified finish (NC)
Purple	Retired, not classified (Ret)
Red	Did not qualify (DNQ)
Red	Did not pre-qualify (DNPQ)
Black	Disqualified (DSQ)
White	Did not start (DNS)
White	Withdrew (WD)
White	Race cancelled (C)
Blank	Did not practice (DNP)
Blank	Did not arrive (DNA)
Blank	Excluded (EX)

**Bold** – Pole
Italics – Fastest Lap

† – Drivers did not finish the race, but were classified as they completed over 75% of the race distance.

=== Teams' Championship ===
Pos.	Driver	NIZ		SMO		SOC		KAZ		SMO		MSC		KAZ		Pts.
1	Lukoil Racing Team	3	1	1	1	1	1	1	1	1	1	1	1	1	1	594
1	Lukoil Racing Team	7	2	2	2	3	2	2	2	3	Ret	3	3	2	2	594
2	Ralf-Car Team			Ret	14	10	11					7	Ret	13	13	6
S2000 and Super Production teams ineligible for points
	AMG Motorsport	1	3	4	4	2	3	4	3	2	3	2	2	4	4	0
	AMG Motorsport	Ret	Ret	7	5	5	4	Ret	5	5	Ret	Ret	5	Ret	5	0
	Innocenti Lada Sport	2	Ret	6	7	7	6	7	10	10	4	13	13	5	9	0
	Innocenti Lada Sport	6	Ret	10	6	9	9	8	Ret	Ret	Ret	Ret	14	6	11	0
	Yushin Racing	9	4	9	8	Ret	Ret	10	8	7	2	12	9	7	12	0
	Syzran Racing Team	4	8	Ret	12	8	8	5	7	8	DSQ	5	15	10	14†	0
	Subaru Russia	5	5	5	11	6	5	11	6	6	NC	8	6	8	6	0
	Subaru Russia											9	11	9	7	0
	Neva Motorsport	10	6	8	15	DNS	10	Ret	11	9	5	11	7	14†	8	0
	Neva Motorsport			WD	WD					Ret	7					0
	Shalunov Racing							6	Ret			6	10			0
	ZAO TD Kurganskie Pritsepy	11	7	11	10	Ret	12†	9	9	11	6	14	12	Ret	Ret	0
	Zagumennov Racing			DSQ	9	DNS	7	Ret	Ret	DNS	Ret	14	12	Ret	Ret	0
	Balashihinskaya UC DOSAAF Russia													11	10	0
	Podmoskovie Motorsport			Ret	13							DNS	Ret			0
Pos.	Driver	NIZ		SMO		SOC		KAZ		SMO		MSC		KAZ		Pts.

Colour	Result
Gold	Winner
Silver	Second place
Bronze	Third place
Green	Points classification
Blue	Non-points classification
Blue	Non-classified finish (NC)
Purple	Retired, not classified (Ret)
Red	Did not qualify (DNQ)
Red	Did not pre-qualify (DNPQ)
Black	Disqualified (DSQ)
White	Did not start (DNS)
White	Withdrew (WD)
White	Race cancelled (C)
Blank	Did not practice (DNP)
Blank	Did not arrive (DNA)
Blank	Excluded (EX)

**Bold** – Pole
Italics – Fastest Lap

† – Drivers did not finish the race, but were classified as they completed over 75% of the race distance.

=== Touring Light ===
Pos.	Driver	NIZ		SMO		SOC		KAZ		SMO		MSC		KAZ		Pts.
1	Dmitry Bragin	**1**	3	**2**	9	Ret	DSQ	**1**	1	**1**	2	**1**	2	6	10	217
2	Ildar Rakhmatullin	6	2	7	3	**1**	3	4	6	3	8	5	3	**1**	8	198
3	Mikhail Mityaev	5	1	6	6	6	6	2	Ret	10	1	2	DNS	8	1	177,5
4	Andrey Nikolaev	Ret	7	4	2	2	5	6	3	2	3	6	10	3	6	165,5
5	Andrey Maslennikov	2	Ret	3	1	10	2	3	10	6	7	9	1	4	11	154
6	Andrey Sevastyanov	4	10†	1	4	5	Ret	3	2	9	5	8	7	9	4	132
7	Vladimir Cherevan	3	5	9	Ret	3	9	5	7	7	4	4	4	5	7	126
8	Andrey Radoshnov	Ret	6	8	7	4	1	Ret	Ret	Ret	Ret	3	8	2	12	102,5
9	Ilsur Akhmetvaleev	10	Ret			9	8	11	Ret	4	6	10	5	10	3	63,5
10	Maksim Belotskiy							10	9	5	DNS	7	6	Ret	5	42
11	Sergey Koronatov	7	9	Ret	Ret	8	7	12	8	8	9	11	9	DNS	9	33
12	Sergey Ryabov					7	4	9	4							32
13	Nikolay Karamyshev	Ret	4	5	5											32
14	Rodion Shushakov													7	2	28,5
15	Vasily Krichevskiy							7	5							16
16	Aleksandr Salnikov	8	DNS	10	8			Ret	Ret							9
17	Pavel Sorochinskiy	9	8													6
Pos.	Driver	NIZ		SMO		SOC		KAZ		SMO		MSC		KAZ		Pts.

=== National ===
Pos.	Driver	NIZ		SMO		SOC		KAZ		SMO		MSC		KAZ		Pts.
1	Dmitry Bragin	**1**	1	3	Ret	Ret	1	5	16	**1**	3	4	3	11	5	188
2	Vladimir Sheshenin	5	6	2	7	8	8	**1**	14	2	2	Ret	16	4	4	160,5
3	Aydar Nuriev	3	5	7	2	5	Ret	4	13	Ret	4	**1**	2	3	10	154,5
4	Albert Gaynullin	7	3	4	6	16	2	9	1	3	1	5	14	14	6	153
5	Pavel Kalmanovich	Ret	10	**1**	3	4	7	3	2	5	5	12	1	6	11	152,5
6	Roman Agoshkov	2	Ret	11	Ret	1	4	Ret	3	Ret	13	DSQ	Ret	**1**	1	150,5
7	Egor Sanin	4	2	15	1	18	3			Ret	6			5	2	120
8	Vasily Korablev	13	9	10	4			2	6	4	Ret			2	12	80
9	Natalya Goltsova	6	4	5	10	3	6	16	5	6	DSQ	Ret	Ret	8	13	79
10	Efim Gantmakher	11	7	6	12	7	11	11	4	9	8	13	4	13	9	58
11	Igor Samsonov	15	12	8	14	**2**	5	Ret	12	8	Ret	16†	7	5	Ret	45,5
12	Aleksandr Golovanov	21	Ret	17	8	10	12	7	17	7	7	3	DNS	Ret	16	39
13	Andrey Petukhov							Ret	Ret	19	9	2	Ret	7	8	38
14	Maksim Simonov	9	Ret	18	5	11	19	10	8	12	11	14	5	15	Ret	31
15	Vitaly Primak	8	8	Ret	13	12	10	12	9			7	15	22	17	19
16	Anton Zakharov					9	9	Ret	Ret	Ret	18	6	6	Ret	DSQ	18
17	Marat Sharapov	16	11					Ret	Ret					9	7	15
18	Timur Shigabutdinov							6	Ret							8
19	Vyacheslav Staroverov	10	15	13	11	Ret	13	19	10	11	Ret	15	8	17	15	7
20	Rafael Fattakhov					8	Ret									4
21	Sergey Drebenets	18	17	16	16					17	14	9	9			4
22	Aleksandr Marushko	14	16	Ret	Ret	14	17	13	20	20	DSQ	8	12	Ret	22	4
23	Mikhail Maleev	Ret	13	9	9	15	14									4
24	Pavel Aleshin									10	10					2
25	Mikhail Zasadych	12	Ret	12	17					14	12	10	11			1
26	Bulat Fatkhullin	20	Ret	14	DNS	Ret	Ret	18	11					16	18	1
27	Aleksandr Garmash	19	Ret	19	19	17	16			15	16	11	10	19	19	1
28	Igor Alekseev													12	14	0
29	Dmitry Karnaukhov	22	18	20	15	13	15			16	17			20	21	0
30	Yury Arshanskiy									13	15					0
31	Ivan Lyagusha	DNS	Ret	DNS	18	Ret	18					Ret	13			0
32	Irek Minnakhmetov							14	Ret							0
33	Aleksandr Azarenkov							20	15			Ret	Ret	21		0
34	Rais Minnikhanov							15	Ret							0
35	Maksim Bronin	17	14													0
36	Oleg Todua							17	Ret							0
37	Aleksandr Samokhvalov							21	18							0
38	Anatoly Korablev													18	20	0
39	Aleksandr Tupitsyn									18	Ret					0
40	Sergey Pluzhnov							Ret	19							0
41	Eduard Sharafiev							Ret	DNS							0
Guest drivers ineligible for points
	Mika Salo													Ret	3	–
	Mikhail Mityaev							8	7							–
Pos.	Driver	NIZ		SMO		SOC		KAZ		SMO		MSC		KAZ		Pts.

=== Junior ===
Pos.	Driver	NIZ		SMO		SOC	KAZ		SMO		MSC	KAZ		Pts.
1	Gleb Kuznetsov	1	1	**1**	1		3	2	**1**	3		**1**	1	129,75
2	Yuliya Strukova	3	2	3	2		**1**	1	2	2		5	3	96,75
3	Sergey Golovanov	**DNS**	DNS	2	3		4	4	4	1		2	4	72,5
4	Aleksey Shin	4	4				5	3	3	Ret		3	2	56,75
5	Vladimir Gusev	2	3				2	Ret				4	5	39
