= 2019 Russian Circuit Racing Series =

Russian motorsport racing season

The 2019 SMP Russian Circuit Racing Series was the sixth season of the Russian Circuit Racing Series, organized by SMP Racing. It was the fifth season with TCR class cars.

== Teams and drivers ==
Yokohama was the official tyre supplier.

=== Touring / TCR Russian Touring Car Championship ===
All teams and drivers were Russian-registered.

| Team | Car | No. | Drivers | Class | Rounds |
|---|---|---|---|---|---|
| STK TAIF Motorsport (Note: Kalmanovich from the AG team, which is not included in the team classification, is declared to the team classification from the TAIF team.) | Hyundai i30 N TCR | 1 | Dmitry Bragin | | All |
| STK TAIF Motorsport | Audi RS3 LMS TCR | 87 | Marat Sharapov | T | All |
| STK TAIF Motorsport | Audi RS3 LMS TCR | 89 | Timur Shigabutdinov | T | 1−5 |
| Lukoil Racing Team | Audi RS3 LMS TCR | 3 | Aleksey Dudukalo | | All |
| Lukoil Racing Team | CUPRA León TCR | 43 | Andrey Maslennikov | | All |
| Lukoil Racing Team | Hyundai i30 N TCR | 62 | Ivan Lukashevich | | All |
| RUMOS Racing | CUPRA León TCR | 7 | Denis Grigoriev | T | 6−7 |
| RUMOS Racing | CUPRA León TCR | 47 | Lev Tolkachev | T | All |
| RUMOS Racing | SEAT León TCR | 30 | Mikhail Mityaev | | 1−5 |
| LADA Sport Rosneft | LADA Vesta Sport TCR | 30 | Mikhail Mityaev | | 6−7 |
| LADA Sport Rosneft | LADA Vesta Sport TCR | 11 | Kirill Ladygin | | All |
| LADA Sport Rosneft | LADA Vesta Sport TCR | 27 | Mikhail Grachev | | 1−5 |
| NEVA Motorsport | Honda Civic Type R TCR (FK8) | 9 | Oleg Kharuk | T | 1 |
| NEVA Motorsport | CUPRA León TCR | 37 | Pavel Yashin | T | 2−4, 6−7 |
| NEVA Motorsport | CUPRA León TCR | 83 | Anton Nemkin | T | 1 |
| Motor Sharks | Volkswagen Golf GTI TCR | 83 | Anton Nemkin | T | 3 |
| Motor Sharks | Honda Civic Type R TCR (FK8) | 83 | Anton Nemkin | T | 4−5, 7 |
| Rally Academy | CUPRA León TCR | 10 | Anton Badoev | T | All |
| VRC-Team | Audi RS3 LMS TCR | 14 | Klim Gavrilov | | 1 |
| Carville Racing | Audi RS3 LMS TCR | 14 | Klim Gavrilov | | 2−7 |
| Carville Racing | Volkswagen Golf GTI TCR | 91 | Grigoriy Burlutskiy | | All |
| Carville Racing | Audi RS3 LMS TCR | 80 | Andrey Abaluev | T | 1, 3 |
| LTA Rally | Audi RS3 LMS TCR | 80 | Andrey Abaluev | T | 4 |
| AG Team | Audi RS3 LMS TCR | 17 | Pavel Kalmanovich | | All |
| AG Team | CUPRA León TCR | 33 | Artur Muradyan | T | 1, 6 |
| UMMC Motorsport | Volkswagen Golf GTI TCR | 22 | Ilsur Akhmetvaleev | T | 1 |
| CHINGISKHAN | Volkswagen Golf GTI TCR | 28 | Anvar Tutaev | T | 5−7 |
| CHINGISKHAN | Volkswagen Golf GTI TCR | 77 | Albert Gilfanov | T | 1−4 |
| CHINGISKHAN | Audi RS3 LMS TCR | 76 | Irek Minnakhmetov | T | 1−6 |
| AMG Motorsport | LADA Vesta TCR | 50 | Aleksandr Marushko | T | All |
| Akhmat Racing Team | Volkswagen Golf GTI TCR | 63 | Ibragim Akhmadov | T | 1−2, 4−7 |
| Akhmat Racing Team | CUPRA León TCR | 95 | Ivan Chubarov | T | All |

Key
Teams claimed for team points.
| T | Since second round SMP RCRS Trophy. |

=== Super Production & Touring-Light ===
All teams and drivers are Russian-registered.

| Team | Car | No. | Drivers | Rounds |
Super Production
| DOSAAF Balashikha | Honda Civic | 8 | Pavel Gavrilushkin | 5 |
| LADA Sport ROSNEFT | LADA Vesta | 10 | Andrey Petukhov | All |
| LADA Sport ROSNEFT | LADA Vesta | 50 | Vladislav Nezvankin | All |
| Sofit Racing Team | Subaru BRZ | 22 | Dmitriy Lebedev | 1−4, 6-7 |
| Sofit Racing Team | Subaru BRZ | 78 | Vadim Antipov | All |
| Sofit Racing Team | Subaru BRZ | 87 | Pavel Pastushkov | 1−2, 5 |
| GTE RT | Mazda 3 | 37 | Andrey Emelin | 1−2 |
| GTE RT | Mazda 3 | 96 | Vasiliy Vladykin | 3−7 |
| Autoprodukt MatchTV | LADA Granta Cup | 45 | Eugeny Meites | 1 |
| Autoprodukt MatchTV SMP Racing | LADA Granta Cup | 45 | Eugeny Meites | 3−6 |
| Autoprodukt MatchTV SMP Racing | LADA Granta Cup | 77 | Yuri Borisenko | 3−7 |
| SMP Racing | LADA Granta Cup | 77 | Yuri Borisenko | 1−2 |
| Delphi Technologies RHHCC Racing Team; ALAS | Volkswagen Scirocco | 54 | Aleksandr Garmash | All |
| Delphi Technologies RHHCC Racing Team; ALAS | Honda Civic Type-R | 88 | Nikolay Vikhanskiy | All |
Touring-Light
| Suvar Motorsport | LADA Kalina | 4 | Ildar Rakhmatullin | 2 |
| S-Logistic Racing | LADA Kalina | 4 | Ildar Rakhmatullin | 4 |
| S-Logistic Racing | Peugeot 208 | 19 | Rodion Shushakov | 1−4, 6-7 |
| S-Logistic Racing | Peugeot 208 | 29 | Vladimir Udalenkov | 1−2, 7 |
| S-Logistic Racing | Peugeot 208 | 89 | Artem Fridman | 5−6 |
| S-Logistic Racing | LADA Granta FL | 5 | Roman Golikov | 3 |
| Rally Academy | LADA Granta FL | 5 | Roman Golikov | 1−2, 4−5 |
| Rally Academy | Volkswagen Polo | 5 | Roman Golikov | 6-7 |
| Rally Academy | Volkswagen Polo | 13 | Igor Samsonov | 6 |
| Rally Academy | Volkswagen Polo | 17 | Vladimir Cherevan | All |
| Rally Academy | Hyundai Solaris | 7 | Aleksandr Salnikov | 3 |
| Aleksandr Salnikov | Hyundai Solaris | 7 | Aleksandr Salnikov | 1−2 |
| B-Tuning Pro Racing | Hyundai Solaris | 7 | Aleksandr Salnikov | 4−6 |
| B-Tuning Pro Racing | Volkswagen Polo | 21 | Artem Kabakov | 4−7 |
| AKHMAT Racing Team; Bragin Racing Team | Kia Rio X-Line | 12 | Mikhail Simonov | 4 |
| AKHMAT Racing Team | Kia Rio X-Line | 85 | Roman Agoshkov | 1 |
| RAVON Racing Team | Ravon Nexia R3 | 16 | Igor Lvov | 6 |
| RAVON Racing Team | Ravon Nexia R3 | 46 | Efim Gantmakher | All |
| RAVON Racing Team | Ravon Nexia R3 | 48 | Aydar Nuriev | 1−5, 7 |
| Polytech:ONE | KIA ProCeed | 52 | Stanislav Aksenov | 6 |
| Drebenets Sergey | LADA Kalina NFR | 57 | Sergey Drebenets | 5 |

Key
Teams claimed for team points.

=== S1600 ===
All teams and drivers are Russian-registered.

| Team | Car | No. | Drivers | Rounds |
|---|---|---|---|---|
| Sergey Schegolev | Hyundai Solaris | 4 | Sergey Schegolev | All |
| Microbor AG Team | Hyundai Solaris | 5 | Boris Shulmeyster | All |
| Microbor AG Team | Hyundai Solaris | 22 | Eugeny Metsker | All |
| Andrey Vasilyev | Volkswagen Polo Se | 14 | Andrey Vasilyev | 2, 7 |
| Roman Shusharin | KIA Rio | 15 | Roman Shusharin | All |
| Ilya Gorbatskiy | Volkswagen Polo Se | 17 | Ilya Gorbatskiy | 1, 3−7 |
| AG Team | KIA Rio | 18 | Thomas Johnson | All |
| AG Team | KIA Rio | 35 | Pavel Kuzminov | All |
| LADA Sport ROSNEFT | LADA Granta FL | 7 | Mikhail Kuldyaev | 2 |
| LADA Sport ROSNEFT | LADA Granta FL | 10 | Vladimir Melnikov | 4 |
| LADA Sport ROSNEFT | LADA Granta FL | 19 | Vladimir Sheshenin | All |
| LADA Sport ROSNEFT | LADA Granta FL | 23 | Kirill Larin | 5 |
| LADA Sport ROSNEFT | LADA Granta FL | 30 | Mikhail Mityaev | All |
| LADA Sport ROSNEFT | LADA Granta FL | 61 | Maxim Kadakov | 3 |
| LADA Sport ROSNEFT | LADA Granta FL | 86 | Mikhail Gorbachev | 1 |
| LADA Sport ROSNEFT | LADA Granta FL | 99 | Vadim Gagarin | 6 |
| B-Tuning Pro Racing | Volkswagen Polo Se | 21 | Anton Pereborsky | 1−2 |
| Alexey Vdovin | LADA Kalina | 24 | Alexey Vdovin | 1−4, 6 |
| AKHMAT Racing Team (Note: In the second round, Parus team Vasily Korablev was announced for the AKHMAT team together with Nafikov.) | KIA Rio X-Line | 44 | Ruslan Nafikov | All |
| AKHMAT Racing Team | Hyundai Solaris | 85 | Roman Agoshkov | 1 |
| AKHMAT Racing Team | KIA Rio | 56 | Vasiliy Korablev | 3−7 |
| Parus | KIA Rio | 56 | Vasiliy Korablev | 1−2 |
| Parus | KIA Rio | 59 | Anatoly Korablev | 4 |
| Airat Zargirov | Hyundai Solaris | 50 | Airat Zargirov | 2 |
| Dmitry Dudarev | LADA Granta FL | 52 | Dmitry Dudarev | 2, 4 |
| Denis Minkin | LADA Granta | 55 | Denis Minkin | 4, 6-7 |
| GTE Racing Team | LADA Granta FL | 84 | Philipp Tuponosov | All |

Key
Teams claimed for team points.

=== S1600 Junior ===
All teams and drivers are Russian-registered and used the cars Volkswagen Polo Se.

| Team | No. | Drivers | Rounds |
|---|---|---|---|
| Rally Academy | 4 | Aleksandr Builov | 1−2, 4, 6-7 |
| Rally Academy | 55 | Petr Plotnikov | 1−2, 4, 6-7 |
| Rally Academy | 78 | Egor Fokin | 1−2, 4, 6-7 |
| B-Tuning Pro Racing: Anton Zakharov's Racing Academy 1 Anton Zakharov's Racing Academy 2 | 7 | Dmitry Galitsin | 1−2, 4, 6-7 |
| B-Tuning Pro Racing: Anton Zakharov's Racing Academy 1 Anton Zakharov's Racing Academy 2 | 19 | Egor Ganin | 1−2, 4, 6-7 |
| B-Tuning Pro Racing: Anton Zakharov's Racing Academy 1 Anton Zakharov's Racing Academy 2 | 22 | Ilya Doschechkin | 1−2, 4, 6-7 |
| B-Tuning Pro Racing: Anton Zakharov's Racing Academy 1 Anton Zakharov's Racing Academy 2 | 33 | Artem Lyakin | 1−2, 4, 6-7 |
| AG Team | 11 | Nikita Dubinin | 1−2, 4, 6-7 |
| AG Team | 18 | Rustam Fathutdinov | 1−2, 4, 6-7 |
| UMMC Motorsport | 13 | Stepan Anufriev | 6-7 |
| AKHMAT Racing Team | 63 | Jabrail Akhmadov | 1−2, 4, 6-7 |
| AKHMAT Racing Team | 95 | Haron Dahkilgov | 1−2, 6-7 |
| Goltsova Racing | 77 | Virsavia Goltsova | 2, 4, 7 |
| Eduard Velmyakin | 88 | Daniil Velmyakin | 2, 4 |

Key
Teams claimed for team points.

== Calendar and results ==
The 2019 schedule was announced on 21 November 2018, with all events scheduled to be held in Russia.

| Rnd. | | Circuit | Date | Touring winner | SP winner | TL winner | S1600 winner | Junior winner | Supporting |
|---|---|---|---|---|---|---|---|---|---|
| 1 | 1 | Fort Grozny Autodrom, Grozny | 20 April | Kirill Ladygin | Vladislav Nezvankin | Vladimir Cherevan | Boris Shulmeyster | Rustam Fathutdinov | SMP F4 Championship |
| 1 | 2 | Fort Grozny Autodrom, Grozny | 21 April | Dmitry Bragin | Andrey Petukhov | Vladimir Cherevan | Vasiliy Korablev | Rustam Fathutdinov | SMP F4 Championship |
| 2 | 3 | NRING Circuit, Bogorodsk | 18 May | Klim Gavrilov | Vadim Antipov | Vladimir Cherevan | Pavel Kuzminov | Rustam Fathutdinov | SMP F4 Championship |
| 2 | 4 | NRING Circuit, Bogorodsk | 19 May | Aleksey Dudukalo | Andrey Petukhov | Efim Gantmakher | Pavel Kuzminov | Rustam Fathutdinov | SMP F4 Championship |
| 3 | 5 | Smolensk Ring, Smolensk | 22 June | Andrey Maslennikov | Vladislav Nezvankin | Roman Golikov | Vladimir Sheshenin | not held | SMP F4 Championship |
| 3 | 6 | Smolensk Ring, Smolensk | 23 June | Kirill Ladygin | Dmitry Lebedev | Rodion Shushakov | Mikhail Mityaev | not held | SMP F4 Championship |
| 4 | 7 | Kazan Ring, Kazan | 13 July | Klim Gavrilov | Eugeny Meites | Mikhail Simonov | Vladimir Sheshenin | Egor Ganin | SMP F4 Championship |
| 4 | 8 | Kazan Ring, Kazan | 14 July | Mikhail Grachev | Vadim Antipov | Roman Golikov | Mikhail Mityaev | Ilya Doschechkin | SMP F4 Championship |
| 5 | 9 | ADM Raceway, Moscow | 3 August | Klim Gavrilov | Andrey Petukhov | Artem Kabakov | Vasiliy Korablev | not held | SMP F4 Championship |
| 5 | 10 | ADM Raceway, Moscow | 4 August | Kirill Ladygin | Andrey Petukhov | Aydar Nuriev | Pavel Kuzminov | not held | SMP F4 Championship |
| 6 | 11 | Moscow Raceway, Volokolamsk | 17 August | Dmitry Bragin | Andrey Petukhov | Efim Gantmakher | Vasiliy Korablev | Rustam Fathutdinov | SMP F4 Championship |
| 6 | 12 | Moscow Raceway, Volokolamsk | 18 August | Kirill Ladygin | Dmitry Lebedev | Artem Kabakov | Mikhail Mityaev | Petr Plotnikov | SMP F4 Championship |
| 7 | 13 | Sochi Autodrom, Sochi | 7 September | Ivan Lukashevich | Vadim Antipov | Artem Kabakov | Mikhail Mityaev | Nikita Dubinin | |
| 7 | 14 | Sochi Autodrom, Sochi | 8 September | Dmitry Bragin | Vadim Antipov | Rodion Shushakov | Vladimir Sheshenin | Egor Fokin | |

== Championship standings ==
Scoring systems

| Position | 1st | 2nd | 3rd | 4th | 5th | 6th | 7th | 8th | 9th | 10th | 11th | 12th | 13th | 14th | 15th | PP | FL |
|---|---|---|---|---|---|---|---|---|---|---|---|---|---|---|---|---|---|
| Points | 25 | 20 | 16 | 13 | 11 | 10 | 9 | 8 | 7 | 6 | 5 | 4 | 3 | 2 | 1 | **1** | 1 |

=== Touring / TCR Russian Touring Car Championship ===
In the Russian Championship only pilots with a Russian racing license earn points, foreign pilots take part only in conducted at five stages in Nizhny Novgorod, Smolensk, ADM, Moscow and Sochi. The winner of the international classification was Dmitry Bragin, the second Klim Gavrilov and the third Kirill Ladygin.

| Pos. | Driver | GRO | | NRG | | SMO | | KAZ | | ADM | | MSC | | SOC | | Pts. |
|---|---|---|---|---|---|---|---|---|---|---|---|---|---|---|---|---|
| 1 | Dmitry Bragin | 6 | 1 | 5 | 2 | 7 | 2 | 6 | 3 | 2 | 6 | 1 | 4 | 5 | 1 | 227 |
| 2 | Kirill Ladygin | **1** | 4 | 3 | 15 | 9 | 1 | 3 | 17 | 6 | 1 | 5 | 1 | 8 | 8 | 192 |
| 3 | Klim Gavrilov | 4 | 12 | **1** | 17 | 3 | 5 | **1** | 7 | **1** | 4 | 6 | 3 | 4 | 16 | 186 |
| 4 | Ivan Lukashevich | 12 | 8 | 2 | 5 | 8 | 4 | 8 | 2 | 3 | 12 | 3 | 6 | **1** | 5 | 176 |
| 5 | Andrey Maslennikov | 3 | 9 | 4 | 6 | **1** | Ret | 2 | 5 | 4 | 5 | **14** | 11 | 2 | 6 | 166 |
| 6 | Pavel Kalmanovich | 10 | 10 | Ret | 9 | 6 | 3 | 5 | 4 | 5 | 8 | 2 | 5 | 7 | 4 | 141 |
| 7 | Aleksey Dudukalo | 7 | 2 | 9 | 1 | 2 | 6 | Ret | 12 | Ret | 11 | 13 | 9 | 3 | 7 | 137 |
| 8 | Grigoriy Burlutskiy | 5 | Ret | 15† | 4 | 4 | 15 | Ret | 9 | 9 | 3 | 8 | 8 | 6 | 2 | 116 |
| 9 | Mikhail Grachev | 2 | 3 | Ret | 16† | 20 | 13 | 9 | 1 | 7 | 2 | WD | WD | | | 102 |
| 10 | Mikhail Mityaev | 14 | 7 | 7 | 7 | 14 | 17 | 11 | 13 | 8 | DNS | 7 | 2 | 9 | 3 | 99 |
| 11 | Anton Badoev | 9 | 6 | Ret | 8 | 5 | 8 | 7 | 8 | 10 | 16 | Ret | 13 | 10 | 11 | 81 |
| 12 | Ivan Chubarov | 8 | 11 | 11 | Ret | 11 | 16 | 10 | 6 | 12 | 7 | 10 | DSQ | DSQ | Ret | 58 |
| 13 | Lev Tolkachev | 11 | 13 | 8 | 3 | 15 | 19 | 13 | 11 | 13 | Ret | Ret | 12 | 17 | 10 | 54 |
| 14 | Irek Minnakhmetov | 15 | 5 | Ret | 14 | Ret | DNS | 4 | Ret | Ret | 13 | 9 | 7 | | | 47 |
| 15 | Ibragim Akhmadov | 13 | Ret | 10 | Ret | | | Ret | 14 | 14 | 9 | 4 | 18 | 14 | 17 | 35 |
| 16 | Pavel Yashin | | | Ret | 11 | 10 | 9 | 15 | 10 | | | 18 | 14 | 12 | 14 | 33 |
| 17 | Marat Sharapov | 22 | 14 | 12 | 12 | 13 | 10 | 12 | 15 | 17 | Ret | 11 | Ret | 18 | 13 | 31 |
| 18 | Timur Shigabutdinov | 20 | 15 | 6 | Ret | 12 | 14 | Ret | Ret | 15 | 10 | | | | | 24 |
| 19 | Aleksandr Marushko | 24 | 19 | 13 | 10 | 16 | 7 | Ret | 16 | DSQ | 15 | 15 | 16 | 15 | 18 | 21 |
| 20 | Anton Nemkin | 16 | DNS | | | 19 | 12 | 14 | Ret | 16 | 14 | | | 11 | 9 | 20 |
| 21 | Anvar Tutaev | | | | | | | | | 11 | Ret | 17 | 10 | 13 | 12 | 18 |
| 22 | Albert Gilfanov | 18 | 16 | 14 | 13 | 18 | 11 | 16 | Ret | | | | | | | 10 |
| 23 | Artur Muradyan | 23 | 18 | | | | | | | | | 12 | 15 | | | 5 |
| 24 | Denis Grigoriev | | | | | | | | | | | 16 | 17 | 16 | 15 | 1 |
| 25 | Andrey Abaluev | 17 | Ret | | | 17 | 18 | 17 | Ret | | | | | | | 0 |
| 26 | Oleg Haruk | 21 | 17 | | | | | | | | | | | | | 0 |
| 27 | Ilsur Akhmetvaleev | 19 | 20 | | | | | | | | | | | | | 0 |
| Pos. | Driver | GRO | | NRG | | SMO | | KAZ | | ADM | | MSC | | SOC | | Pts. |

| Colour | Result |
|---|---|
| Gold | Winner |
| Silver | Second place |
| Bronze | Third place |
| Green | Points classification |
| Blue | Non-points classification |
| Blue | Non-classified finish (NC) |
| Purple | Retired, not classified (Ret) |
| Red | Did not qualify (DNQ) |
| Red | Did not pre-qualify (DNPQ) |
| Black | Disqualified (DSQ) |
| White | Did not start (DNS) |
| White | Withdrew (WD) |
| White | Race cancelled (C) |
| Blank | Did not practice (DNP) |
| Blank | Did not arrive (DNA) |
| Blank | Excluded (EX) |

**Bold** – Pole
Italics – Fastest Lap

† – Drivers did not finish the race, but were classified as they completed over 75% of the race distance.

==== Touring / TCR Russian Touring Car Championship Team's Standings ====
| Pos. | Team | GRO | | NRG | | SMO | | KAZ | | ADM | | MSC | | SOC | | Pts. |
|---|---|---|---|---|---|---|---|---|---|---|---|---|---|---|---|---|
| 1 | TAIF Motorsport | 6 | 1 | 5 | 2 | 6 | 2 | 5 | 3 | 2 | 6 | 1 | 4 | 5 | 1 | 368 |
| 1 | TAIF Motorsport | 10 | 10 | Ret | 9 | 7 | 3 | 6 | 4 | 5 | 8 | 2 | 5 | 7 | 4 | 368 |
| 2 | Lukoil Racing Team | 7 | 2 | 2 | 1 | 1 | 4 | 2 | 5 | 3 | 5 | 3 | 6 | 1 | 5 | 362 |
| 2 | Lukoil Racing Team | 12 | 8 | 9 | 5 | 8 | Ret | 2 | 8 | 4 | 12 | 14 | 11 | 2 | 6 | 362 |
| 3 | LADA Sport Rosneft | 1 | 3 | 3 | 15 | 9 | 1 | 3 | 1 | 6 | 1 | 5 | 1 | 8 | 3 | 346 |
| 3 | LADA Sport Rosneft | 2 | 4 | Ret | 16† | 20 | 13 | 9 | 17 | 7 | 2 | 7 | 2 | 9 | 8 | 346 |
| 4 | Carville Racing | 5 | Ret | 1 | 4 | 3 | 5 | 1 | 7 | 1 | 3 | 6 | 3 | 4 | 2 | 285 |
| 4 | Carville Racing | 17 | Ret | 15† | 17 | 4 | 15 | Ret | 9 | 9 | 4 | 8 | 8 | 6 | 16 | 285 |
| 5 | RUMOS Racing | 11 | 7 | 7 | 3 | 14 | 17 | 11 | 11 | 8 | Ret | 16 | 12 | 16 | 10 | 102 |
| 5 | RUMOS Racing | 14 | 13 | 8 | 7 | 15 | 19 | 13 | 13 | 13 | DNS | Ret | 17 | 17 | 15 | 102 |
| 6 | AKHMAT Racing Team | 8 | 11 | 10 | Ret | 11 | 16 | 10 | 6 | 12 | 7 | 4 | 18 | 14 | 17 | 93 |
| 6 | AKHMAT Racing Team | 13 | Ret | 11 | Ret | | | Ret | 14 | 14 | 9 | 10 | DSQ | DSQ | Ret | 93 |
| 7 | NEVA Motorsport | 16 | 17 | | | | | | | | | | | | | 0 |
| 7 | NEVA Motorsport | 21 | DNS | | | | | | | | | | | | | 0 |
| Pos. | Team | GRO | | NRG | | SMO | | KAZ | | ADM | | MSC | | SOC | | Pts. |

=== Super Production ===
| Pos. | Driver | GRO | | NRG | | SMO | | KAZ | | ADM | | MSC | | SOC | | Pts. |
|---|---|---|---|---|---|---|---|---|---|---|---|---|---|---|---|---|
| 1 | Andrey Petukhov | 2 | 1 | 2 | 1 | 2 | 3 | 3 | 6 | **1** | 1 | 1 | 3 | 2 | 4 | 280 |
| 2 | Vadim Antipov | 5 | 8 | 1 | 2 | 3 | 4 | 4 | 1 | 4 | 6 | 2 | 5 | 1 | 1 | 240 |
| 3 | Vladislav Nezvankin | **1** | 3 | 7 | 3 | **1** | 2 | 2 | 2 | 5 | Ret | 5 | DSQ | 6 | 5 | 201 |
| 4 | Dmitriy Lebedev | 6 | 4 | **3** | 9 | DSQ | 1 | 5 | 3 | | | **6** | 1 | 5 | 2 | 168 |
| 5 | Yuri Borisenko | 3 | 7 | 8 | 4 | Ret | 7 | 6 | 7 | 7 | 2 | 4 | 2 | **3** | 7 | 162 |
| 6 | Eugeny Meites | 4 | 3 | | | Ret | 6 | **1** | 4 | 2 | Ret | 7 | 6 | 4 | 9 | 139 |
| 7 | Aleksandr Garmash | 7 | 9 | 4 | 7 | 4 | 5 | DNS | 5 | 3 | 5 | 8 | 4 | 8 | 8 | 137 |
| 8 | Nikolay Vikhanskiy | Ret | Ret | 5 | 6 | 5 | 8 | Ret | Ret | Ret | Ret | 3 | Ret | DNS | 3 | 73 |
| 9 | Pavel Pastushkov | DNS | 5 | 6 | 8 | | | | | 6 | 7 | | | | | 48 |
| 10 | Vasiliy Vladykin | | | | | Ret | DNS | Ret | 8 | Ret | 4 | Ret | Ret | 7 | 6 | 40 |
| 11 | Andrey Emelin | DSQ | 6 | Ret | 5 | | | | | | | | | | | 21 |
| 12 | Pavel Gavrilushkin | | | | | | | | | Ret | 3 | | | | | 16 |
| Pos. | Driver | GRO | | NRG | | SMO | | KAZ | | ADM | | MSC | | SOC | | Pts. |

==== Super Production Teams' Standings ====
| Pos. | Team | GRO | | NRG | | SMO | | KAZ | | ADM | | MSC | | SOC | | Pts. |
|---|---|---|---|---|---|---|---|---|---|---|---|---|---|---|---|---|
| 1 | LADA Sport Rosneft | **1** | 1 | 2 | 1 | 1 | 2 | 2 | 2 | **1** | 1 | 1 | 3 | 2 | 4 | 481 |
| 1 | LADA Sport Rosneft | 2 | 3 | 7 | 3 | 2 | 3 | 3 | 6 | 5 | Ret | 5 | DSQ | 6 | 5 | 481 |
| 2 | Sofit Racing Team | 5 | 4 | 1 | 2 | 3 | 1 | 4 | 1 | 4 | 6 | 2 | 1 | 1 | 1 | 427 |
| 2 | Sofit Racing Team | 6 | 8 | **3** | 9 | DSQ | 4 | 5 | 3 | 6 | 7 | **6** | 5 | 5 | 2 | 427 |
| 3 | Autoprodukt MatchTV SMP Racing | | | | | Ret | 5 | **1** | 4 | 2 | 2 | 4 | 2 | **3** | 7 | 226 |
| 3 | Autoprodukt MatchTV SMP Racing | | | | | Ret | 7 | 6 | 7 | 7 | Ret | 7 | 6 | 4 | 9 | 226 |
| 4 | Delphi Technologies RHHCC Racing Team | 7 | 9 | 4 | 6 | 4 | 5 | Ret | 5 | 3 | 5 | 3 | 4 | 8 | 3 | 210 |
| 4 | Delphi Technologies RHHCC Racing Team | Ret | Ret | 5 | 7 | 5 | 8 | DNS | Ret | Ret | Ret | 8 | Ret | DNS | 8 | 210 |
| Pos. | Team | GRO | | NRG | | SMO | | KAZ | | ADM | | MSC | | SOC | | Pts. |

=== Touring Light ===
| Pos. | Driver | GRO | | NRG | | SMO | | KAZ | | ADM | | MSC | | SOC | | Pts. |
|---|---|---|---|---|---|---|---|---|---|---|---|---|---|---|---|---|
| 1 | Vladimir Cherevan | **1** | 1 | 1 | 2 | 4 | 4 | 4 | 2 | 3 | 2 | 6 | 3 | 6 | 5 | 241 |
| 2 | Efim Gantmakher | Ret | 3 | **3** | 1 | 2 | 3 | 6 | 4 | Ret | 3 | 1 | 4 | 2 | 3 | 210 |
| 3 | Roman Golikov | 3 | 2 | 7 | 3 | 1 | 2 | 7 | 1 | Ret | 5 | Ret | 5 | 5 | 6 | 183 |
| 4 | Rodion Shushakov | 4 | 5 | 6 | 6 | 5 | 1 | **4** | 5 | | | 3 | 9 | 4 | 1 | 166 |
| 5 | Aleksandr Salnikov | 6 | 6 | 5 | 5 | 3 | 5 | 5 | 3 | 4 | 4 | 8 | 7 | Ret | 4 | 152 |
| 6 | Artem Kabakov | | | | | | | 2 | Ret | **1** | 6 | 4 | 1 | 1 | 2 | 143 |
| 7 | Aydar Nuriev | 2 | 8 | Ret | DNS | 6 | Ret | | | 2 | 1 | | | Ret | 8 | 92 |
| 8 | Vladimir Udalenkov | 5 | 4 | 2 | Ret | | | | | | | | | 3 | 7 | 69 |
| 9 | Ildar Rakhmatullin | | | 4 | 4 | | | 3 | Ret | | | | | | | 42 |
| 10 | Mikhail Simonov | | | | | | | 1 | 6 | | | | | | | 35 |
| 11 | Igor Samsonov | | | | | | | | | | | **5** | 2 | | | 32 |
| 12 | Artem Fridman | | | | | | | | | 5 | Ret | 7 | 6 | | | 30 |
| 13 | Igor Lvov | | | | | | | | | | | 2 | 8 | | | 28 |
| 14 | Stanislav Aksenov | | | | | | | | | | | 9 | 10 | | | 13 |
| 15 | Roman Agoshkov | DSQ | 7 | | | | | | | | | | | | | 9 |
| Pos. | Driver | GRO | | NRG | | SMO | | KAZ | | ADM | | MSC | | SOC | | Pts. |

==== Touring Light Teams' Standings ====
| Pos. | Team | GRO | | NRG | | SMO | | KAZ | | ADM | | MSC | | SOC | | Pts. |
|---|---|---|---|---|---|---|---|---|---|---|---|---|---|---|---|---|
| 1 | Rally Academy | **1** | 1 | 1 | 2 | 3 | 4 | 4 | 1 | 3 | 2 | **5** | 2 | 5 | 5 | 402 |
| 1 | Rally Academy | 3 | 2 | 7 | 3 | 4 | 5 | 7 | 2 | Ret | 5 | 6 | 3 | 6 | 6 | 402 |
| 2 | RAVON Racing Team | 2 | 3 | **3** | 1 | 2 | 3 | 6 | 4 | 2 | 1 | 1 | 4 | 2 | 3 | 330 |
| 2 | RAVON Racing Team | Ret | 8 | Ret | DNS | 6 | Ret | | | Ret | 3 | 2 | 8 | Ret | 8 | 330 |
| 3 | S-Logistic Racing | 4 | 4 | 2 | 6 | 1 | 1 | 3 | 5 | 5 | Ret | 3 | 6 | 3 | 1 | 326 |
| 3 | S-Logistic Racing | 5 | 5 | 6 | 6 | 5 | 2 | 4 | Ret | | | 7 | 9 | 4 | 7 | 326 |
| 4 | B-Tuning Pro Racing Team | | | | | | | 2 | 3 | **1** | 4 | 4 | 1 | 1 | 2 | 226 |
| 4 | B-Tuning Pro Racing Team | | | | | | | 5 | Ret | 4 | 6 | 8 | 7 | Ret | 4 | 226 |
| Pos. | Team | GRO | | NRG | | SMO | | KAZ | | ADM | | MSC | | SOC | | Pts. |

=== S1600 ===
| Pos. | Driver | GRO | | NRG | | SMO | | KAZ | | ADM | | MSC | | SOC | | Pts. |
|---|---|---|---|---|---|---|---|---|---|---|---|---|---|---|---|---|
| 1 | Mikhail Mityaev | DSQ | DSQ | 2 | Ret | **2** | 1 | 2 | 1 | 4 | 5 | 7 | 1 | 1 | 3 | 212 |
| 2 | Pavel Kuzminov | 4 | 6 | 1 | 1 | 4 | 5 | 3 | 3 | 5 | 1 | 5 | 10 | 9 | Ret | 194 |
| 3 | Boris Shulmeyster | 1 | 5 | 4 | 3 | 6 | 4 | Ret | 4 | 2 | 3 | 2 | 4 | 2 | Ret | 191 |
| 4 | Vladimir Sheshenin | DSQ | DSQ | **17** | 5 | 1 | 2 | **1** | 2 | 8 | 6 | 6 | 2 | **Ret** | 1 | 181 |
| 5 | Vasiliy Korablev | **11** | 1 | 5 | 2 | 5 | 7 | 12 | Ret | **1** | 13 | **1** | 6 | 3 | 4 | 180 |
| 6 | Ruslan Nafikov | 5 | 12 | 3 | Ret | 3 | 3 | Ret | 7 | 3 | 2 | 3 | 3 | 5 | 2 | 172 |
| 7 | Thomas Johnson | 2 | 2 | 14 | 6 | 7 | 6 | 4 | 15 | 6 | 4 | 8 | 8 | 4 | 5 | 148 |
| 8 | Roman Shusharin | 3 | 4 | 8 | Ret | 10 | Ret | Ret | 6 | Ret | 7 | 4 | 5 | 12 | Ret | 90 |
| 9 | Philipp Tuponosov | 6 | 8 | 7 | 14 | 9 | 8 | 6 | 9 | Ret | 11 | 13 | 14 | 6 | 7 | 90 |
| 10 | Sergey Schegolev | Ret | DNS | 10 | 7 | 11 | 9 | 5 | 13 | 10 | 9 | 9 | 9 | 4 | DSQ | 77 |
| 11 | Ilya Gorbatskiy | 10 | 10 | | | 14 | 10 | 8 | 10 | 7 | 12 | 12 | 13 | 10 | 6 | 70 |
| 12 | Eugeny Metsker | 8 | 11 | 9 | 10 | 8 | Ret | 7 | 8 | Ret | 8 | 10 | 11 | Ret | Ret | 70 |
| 13 | Anton Pereborsky | 7 | 7 | 6 | 4 | | | | | | | | | | | 41 |
| 14 | Alexey Vdovin | 9 | 9 | 16 | 13 | 10 | 11 | DNS | Ret | | | 15 | Ret | | | 27 |
| 15 | Denis Minkin | | | | | | | 10 | 14 | | | 11 | 12 | 8 | Ret | 25 |
| 16 | Andrey Vasilyev | | | 15 | 12 | | | DNS | 14 | | | | | 11 | 8 | 22 |
| 17 | Dmitry Dudarev | | | 12 | 11 | | | 9 | 11 | | | | | | | 21 |
| 18 | Roman Agoshkov | 12 | 3 | | | | | | | | | | | | | 20 |
| 19 | Airat Zargirov | | | 11 | 8 | | | | | | | | | | | 13 |
| 20 | Kirill Larin | | | | | | | | | 9 | 10 | | | | | 13 |
| 21 | Vadim Gagarin | | | | | | | | | | | 14 | 7 | | | 11 |
| 22 | Vladimir Melnikov | | | | | | | Ret | 4 | | | | | | | 11 |
| 23 | Mikhail Kuldyaev | | | 13 | 9 | | | | | | | | | | | 10 |
| 24 | Anatoly Korablev | | | | | | | 11 | Ret | | | | | | | 5 |
| 25 | Maxim Kadakov | | | | | 13 | Ret | | | | | | | | | 3 |
| | Mikhail Gorbachev | DNQ | DNQ | | | | | | | | | | | | | 0 |
| Pos. | Driver | GRO | | NRG | | SMO | | KAZ | | ADM | | MSC | | SOC | | Pts. |

=== S1600 Teams' standings ===
| Pos. | Team | GRO | | NRG | | SMO | | KAZ | | ADM | | MSC | | SOC | | Pts. |
|---|---|---|---|---|---|---|---|---|---|---|---|---|---|---|---|---|
| 1 | LADA Sport Rosneft | DSQ | DSQ | 2 | 5 | 1 | 1 | **1** | 1 | 4 | 5 | 6 | 1 | 1 | 1 | 393 |
| 1 | LADA Sport Rosneft | DSQ | DSQ | 13 | 9 | **2** | 2 | 2 | 2 | 8 | 6 | 6 | 2 | **Ret** | 3 | 393 |
| 2 | AG Team | 2 | 2 | 1 | 1 | 4 | 5 | 3 | 3 | 5 | 1 | 5 | 8 | 4 | 5 | 342 |
| 2 | AG Team | 4 | 6 | 14 | 6 | 7 | 6 | 4 | 15 | 6 | 4 | 8 | 10 | 9 | Ret | 342 |
| 3 | AKHMAT Racing Team | 5 | 3 | 3 | Ret | 3 | 3 | 12 | 7 | **1** | 2 | 1 | 3 | 3 | 2 | 342 |
| 3 | AKHMAT Racing Team | 12 | 12 | 5 | Ret | 5 | 7 | Ret | Ret | 3 | 13 | 3 | 6 | 5 | 4 | 342 |
| 4 | Microbor AG Team | 1 | 5 | 4 | 3 | 6 | 4 | 7 | 4 | 2 | 3 | 2 | 4 | 2 | Ret | 261 |
| 4 | Microbor AG Team | 8 | 11 | 9 | 10 | 8 | Ret | Ret | 8 | Ret | 8 | 10 | 11 | Ret | Ret | 261 |
| Pos. | Team | GRO | | NRG | | SMO | | KAZ | | ADM | | MSC | | SOC | | Pts. |
