= Moscow Ring =

Moscow Ring may refer to:

- Autodrom Moscow, a racing track near Moscow, Russia
- MKAD, a beltway encircling Moscow, Russia
