= 2019 FIA European Rallycross Championship =

FIA European Rallycross Championship season

The 2019 FIA European Rallycross Championship was the 44th season of the FIA European Rallycross Championship. The season consists of eight rounds across two categories; Supercar and Super1600. The season commenced on 26 April with the Spanish round at the Circuit de Barcelona-Catalunya, and culminated on 14 September in Latvia at the Biķernieku Kompleksā Sporta Bāze.

== Calendar ==
The 2019 calendar was unveiled on 25 October 2018

| Rnd | Event | Venue | Dates | Category | Final Winner | Team |
|---|---|---|---|---|---|---|
| 1 | (Spain) Euro RX of Barcelona - Catalunya | Circuit de Barcelona-Catalunya, Montmeló | 27–28 April | Super1600 | (Russia) Aydar Nuriev | (Hungary) Volland Racing |
| 2 | (Belgium) Euro RX of Benelux | Circuit de Spa-Francorchamps, Spa-Francorchamps | 11–12 May | Super1600 | (Russia) Aydar Nuriev | (Hungary) Volland Racing |
| 3 | (United Kingdom) Euro RX of Great Britain | Silverstone Circuit, Silverstone | 25–26 May | Supercar | (Sweden) Robin Larsson | (Sweden) JC Raceteknik |
| 4 | Euro RX of Norway | Lånkebanen, Hell | 15–16 June | Supercar | (Sweden) Robin Larsson | (Sweden) JC Raceteknik |
| 5 | Euro RX of Sweden | Höljesbanan, Höljes | 6–7 July | Supercar | (Sweden) Robin Larsson | (Sweden) JC Raceteknik |
| 5 | Euro RX of Sweden | Höljesbanan, Höljes | 6–7 July | Super1600 | (Norway) Marius Bermingrud | (Norway) Marius Bermingrud |
| 6 | Euro RX of Germany | Estering, Buxtehude | 17–18 August | Supercar | (Norway) Thomas Bryntesson | (Norway) TBRX |
| 6 | Euro RX of Germany | Estering, Buxtehude | 17–18 August | Super1600 | (Switzerland) Yuri Belevskiy | (Hungary) Volland Racing |
| 7 | Euro RX of France | Circuit de Lohéac, Lohéac | 31 August–1 September | Supercar | (Sweden) Robin Larsson | (Sweden) JC Raceteknik |
| 7 | Euro RX of France | Circuit de Lohéac, Lohéac | 31 August–1 September | Super1600 | (Russia) Aydar Nuriev | (Hungary) Volland Racing |
| 8 | Euro RX of Latvia | Biķernieku Kompleksā Sporta Bāze, Riga | 14–15 September | Supercar | (France) Jean-Baptiste Dubourg | (France) Jean-Baptiste Dubourg |
| 8 | Euro RX of Latvia | Biķernieku Kompleksā Sporta Bāze, Riga | 14–15 September | Super1600 | (Russia) Timur Shigabutdinov | (Hungary) Volland Racing |

=== Calendar changes ===
- The Euro RX of Portugal was dropped from the calendar.
- The Euro RX of Great Britain returned after a one-year hiatus at the Silverstone Circuit, the event had previously been held at the Lydden Hill Race Circuit.
- The Euro RX of Belgium moved from the Circuit Jules Tacheny Mettet to the Circuit de Spa-Francorchamps and was renamed to the Euro RX of Benelux.
- The Euro RX of Germany became a standalone event and moved from October to August.

== Entry Lists ==
=== Supercar ===
| Constructor | Entrant | Car | No. | Drivers | Rounds |
|---|---|---|---|---|---|
| Audi | (Hungary) Kárai Motorsport Egyesület | Audi A1 | 73 | (Hungary) Tamás Kárai | All |
| Audi | (Hungary) RXC Technics Motorsport KFT | Audi A1 | 86 | (Hungary) Zoltán Vass | 6 |
| Audi | (Sweden) JC Raceteknik | Audi S1 | 4 | (Sweden) Robin Larsson | 1-5 |
| Audi | (Sweden) JC Raceteknik | Audi S1 | 54 | (Sweden) Mats Öhman | 3, 6 |
| Citroën | (Norway) Ole Kristian Temte | Citroën C4 | 30 | (Norway) Ole Kristian Temte | 2-3 |
| Citroën | (Portugal) Mario Barbosa | Citroën DS3 | 75 | (Portugal) Mario Barbosa | 2-5 |
| Citroën | (Norway) Hans-Jøran Østreng | Citroën DS3 | 88 | (Norway) Hans-Jøran Østreng | 2-3 |
| Citroën | (France) David Meslier | Citroën DS3 | 27 | (France) David Meslier | 5 |
| Citroën | (France) Stéphane De Ganay | Citroën DS3 | 47 | (France) Stéphane De Ganay | 5 |
| Citroën | (Latvia) Janis Vegeris | Citroën DS3 | 52 | (Latvia) Janis Vegeris | 6 |
| Ford | (Finland) Mikko Ikonen | Ford Fiesta | 10 | (Finland) Mikko Ikonen | 1-5 |
| Ford | (Lithuania) TLK 'Baltijos Sportas' | Ford Fiesta | 55 | (Lithuania) Paulius Pleskovas | 1, 3-6 |
| Ford | (Norway) Stein Egil Jenssen | Ford Fiesta | 61 | (Norway) Stein Egil Jenssen | 2-4 |
| Ford | (Norway) Stene André Johansen | Ford Fiesta | 76 | (Norway) Stene André Johansen | 3 |
| Ford | (Republic of Ireland) Oliver O'Donovan | Ford Fiesta | 2 | (Republic of Ireland) Oliver O'Donovan | 5 |
| Ford | (United Kingdom) Mark Flaherty | Ford Fiesta | 37 | (United Kingdom) Mark Flaherty | 5 |
| Ford | (Republic of Ireland) Derek Tohill | Ford Fiesta | 111 | (Republic of Ireland) Derek Tohill | 5 |
| Ford | (Hungary) Nyirád Motorsport KFT | Ford Focus | 49 | (Hungary) Janko Wieszt | 5 |
| Hyundai | (France) Patrick Guillerme | Hyundai i20 | 83 | (France) Patrick Guillerme | 5 |
| Peugeot | (France) Andréa Dubourg | Peugeot 208 | 23 | (France) Andréa Dubourg | All |
| Peugeot | (France) Jean-Baptiste Dubourg | Peugeot 208 | 87 | (France) Jean-Baptiste Dubourg | All |
| Peugeot | (Hungary) NYIRÁD MOTORSPORT KFT | Peugeot 208 | 50 | (Hungary) Attila Mózer | All |
| Peugeot | (France) Rodolphe Audran | Peugeot 208 | 56 | (France) Rodolphe Audran | 1, 3-5 |
| Peugeot | (France) Laurent Bouliou | Peugeot 208 | 78 | (France) Laurent Bouliou | 3, 5 |
| Peugeot | (France) Antoine Masse | Peugeot 208 | 11 | (France) Antoine Masse | 5 |
| Peugeot | (France) Pascal Lambec | Peugeot 208 | 28 | (France) Pascal Lambec | 5 |
| Peugeot | (France) Emmanuel Anne | Peugeot 208 | 29 | (France) Emmanuel Anne | 5 |
| Peugeot | (France) Gaëtan Serazin | Peugeot 208 | 62 | (France) Gaëtan Serazin | 5 |
| Renault | (Sweden) Helmia Motorsport | Renault Clio | 48 | (Sweden) Lukas Walfridson | 1–3 |
| Renault | (France) Emmanuel Galivel | Renault Clio | 32 | (France) Emmanuel Galivel | 5 |
| SEAT | (Germany) All-Inkl.com Münnich Motorsport | Seat Ibiza | 38 | (Germany) Mandie August | All |
| SEAT | (Germany) All-Inkl.com Münnich Motorsport | Seat Ibiza | 77 | (Germany) René Münnich | 1-5 |
| Volkswagen | (Sweden) Eklund Motorsport | Volkswagen Beetle | 45 | (Sweden) Pontus Tidemand | 1–4 |
| Volkswagen | (Finland) Mikko Ikonen | Volkswagen Beetle | 93 | (Sweden) Sebastian Eriksson | 6 |
| Volkswagen | (Sweden) Hedström Motorsport | Volkswagen Polo | 8 | (Sweden) Peter Hedström | 1–4, 6 |
| Volkswagen | (Sweden) Hedström Motorsport | Volkswagen Polo | 91 | (Sweden) Christer Dalmans | 4 |
| Volkswagen | (Sweden) Hedström Motorsport | Volkswagen Polo | 188 | (Sweden) Daniel Thorén | 1, 3 |
| Volkswagen | (Sweden) Hedström Motorsport | Volkswagen Polo | 53 | (Norway) Alexander Hvaal | 2 |
| Volkswagen | (Sweden) Hedström Motorsport | Volkswagen Polo | 105 | (Sweden) Linus Westman | 6 |
| Volkswagen | (Sweden) Kristoffersson Motorsport | Volkswagen Polo | 69 | (Norway) Sondre Evjen | All |
| Volkswagen | (Norway) TBRX | Volkswagen Polo | 16 | (Norway) Thomas Bryntesson | All |
| Volkswagen | (Czech Republic) KRTZ motorsport ACCR Czech Team | Volkswagen Polo R | 99 | (Czech Republic) Aleš Fučík | All |

=== Super1600 ===
| Constructor | Entrant | Car | No. | Drivers | Rounds |
|---|---|---|---|---|---|
| Audi | (Hungary) Volland Racing | Audi A1s | 15 | (Hungary) Gergely Márton | All |
| Audi | (Hungary) Volland Racing | Audi A1s | 39 | (Russia) Artur Egorov | All |
| Audi | (Hungary) Volland Racing | Audi A1s | 48 | (Russia) Aydar Nuriev | All |
| Audi | (Hungary) Volland Racing | Audi A1s | 89 | (Russia) Timur Shigabutdinov | All |
| Audi | (Hungary) Volland Racing | Audi A1s | 95 | (Switzerland) Yuri Belevskiy | All |
| Citroën | (France) Jérémy Lambec | Citroën C2 | 128 | (France) Jérémy Lambec | 1-2 |
| Citroën | (France) Maximilien Eveno | Citroën C2 | 75 | (France) Maximilien Eveno | 1–3, 5 |
| Citroën | (Norway) Guro Majormoen | Citroën C2 | 85 | (Norway) Guro Majormoen | 1–4, 6 |
| Dacia | (France) David Moulin | Dacia Sandero | 53 | (France) David Moulin | 5 |
| Ford | (Hungary) Kárai Motorsport Egyesület | Ford Fiesta | 13 | (Hungary) András Ferjáncz | 2-3 |
| Opel | (Norway) Lars Christian Lote Rosland | Opel Corsa | 80 | (Norway) Lars Christian Lote Rosland | 4 |
| Peugeot | (Czech Republic) Jihocesky Autklub V ACR | Peugeot 207 | 96 | (Czech Republic) Marcel Suchý | All |
| Peugeot | (Norway) Espen Isaksætre | Peugeot 208 | 8 | (Norway) Espen Isaksætre | 3 |
| Renault | (France) Jan Anthony | Renault Clio | 35 | (France) Anthony Jan | 4-5 |
| Renault | (Netherlands) Marcel Snoeijers | Renault Mégane | 50 | (Netherlands) Marcel Snoeijers | All |
| Renault | (Russia) AG Team | Renault Twingo | 19 | (Russia) Egor Sanin | All |
| Renault | (United Kingdom) Jack Thorne | Renault Twingo | 133 | (United Kingdom) Jack Thorne | 1-5 |
| Renault | (Estonia) RS Racing Team | Renault Twingo | 20 | (Estonia) Siim Saluri | All |
| Škoda | (Czech Republic) PAJ.R.R.O. | Škoda Citigo | 136 | (Czech Republic) Tomáš Krejcík | All |
| Škoda | (Russia) AG Team | Škoda Fabia | 7 | (Russia) Marat Knyazev | All |
| Škoda | (Czech Republic) Josef Šusta ACCR Czech Team | Škoda Fabia | 16 | (Czech Republic) Josef Šusta | All |
| Škoda | (Estonia) Ligur Racing | Škoda Fabia | 10 | (Estonia) Janno Ligur | All |
| Škoda | (Norway) Marius Bermingrud | Škoda Fabia | 51 | (Norway) Marius Bermingrud | All |
| Škoda | (Norway) Ole Henry Steinsholt | Škoda Fabia | 88 | (Norway) Ole Henry Steinsholt | All |
| Škoda | (Hungary) Speedy Motorsport | Škoda Fabia | 18 | (Hungary) Zsolt SZIJJ Jolly | 1-5 |
| Škoda | (France) Terpereau | Škoda Fabia | 37 | (France) Jimmy Terpereau | 1–3, 5 |
| Škoda | (France) Jérémy Lambec | Škoda Fabia | 128 | (France) Jérémy Lambec | 4-5 |
| Škoda | (France) Yvonnick Jagu | Škoda Fabia | 31 | (France) Yvonnick Jagu | 5 |
| Škoda | (Czech Republic) Diana Czech National Team | Škoda Fabia MK2 | 3 | (Czech Republic) Pavel Vimmer | All |
| Škoda | (Poland) Radoslaw Raczkowski | Škoda Fabia MK3 | 117 | (Poland) Radoslaw Raczkowski | 2-6 |
| Volkswagen | (Poland) Jakub Wyszynski | Volkswagen Polo MK5 | 57 | (Poland) Jakub Wyszynski | 1-3 |

== Results and standings ==
Championship points are scored as follows:

| | Position | | | | | | | | | | | | | | | |
| Round | 1st | 2nd | 3rd | 4th | 5th | 6th | 7th | 8th | 9th | 10th | 11th | 12th | 13th | 14th | 15th | 16th |
|---|---|---|---|---|---|---|---|---|---|---|---|---|---|---|---|---|
| Heats | 16 | 15 | 14 | 13 | 12 | 11 | 10 | 9 | 8 | 7 | 6 | 5 | 4 | 3 | 2 | 1 |
| Semi-Finals | 6 | 5 | 4 | 3 | 2 | 1 | | | | | | | | | | |
| Final | 8 | 5 | 4 | 3 | 2 | 1 | | | | | | | | | | |

- A red background denotes drivers who did not advance from the round

=== Supercar ===
| Pos. | Driver | GBR (United Kingdom) | NOR (Norway) | SWE (Sweden) | GER (Germany) | FRA (France) | LAT (Latvia) | Points |
|---|---|---|---|---|---|---|---|---|
| 1 | (Sweden) Robin Larsson | 1 | 1 | 1 | 2 | 1 | | 146 |
| 2 | (France) Jean-Baptiste Dubourg | 3 | 2 | 3 | 6 | 2 | 1 | 139 |
| 3 | (Norway) Thomas Bryntesson | 2 | 3 | 13 | 1 | 7 | 9 | 130 |
| 4 | (France) Andréa Dubourg | 5 | 5 | 12 | 7 | 6 | 2 | 98 |
| 5 | (Germany) René Münnich | 4 | 9 | 5 | 3 | 5 | | 90 |
| 6 | (Hungary) Tamás Karái | 12 | 8 | 4 | 11 | 3 | 8 | 79 |
| 7 | (Norway) Sondre Evjen | 13 | 6 | 7 | 12 | 8 | 5 | 73 |
| 8 | (Sweden) Pontus Tidemand | 6 | 7 | 2 | 4 | | | 66 |
| 9 | (Finland) Mikko Ikonen | 9 | 4 | 11 | 8 | 11 | | 58 |
| 10 | (Sweden) Peter Hedström | 8 | 11^{a} | 9 | 5 | | 3 | 56 |
| 11 | (Sweden) Lukas Walfridson | 7 | 12 | 10 | | | | 32 |
| 12 | (Germany) Mandie August | 10 | 14 | 17 | 10 | 14 | 13 | 26 |
| 13 | (Sweden) Sebastian Eriksson | | | | | | 4 | 23 |
| 14 | (Lithuania) Paulius Pleskovas | 14 | | 6 | 9 | 20 | 14 | 23 |
| 15 | (France) Antoine Masse | | | | | 4 | | 18 |
| 16 | (Czech Republic) Aleš Fučík | 15 | 13 | 20 | 17 | 16 | 10 | 16 |
| 17 | (Sweden) Linus Westman | | | | | | 6 | 13 |
| 18 | (Sweden) Mats Öhman | | | 18 | | | 7 | 13 |
| 19 | (France) Gaëtan Serazin | | | | | 10 | | 11 |
| 20 | (Norway) Alexander Hvaal | | 10 | | | | | 11 |
| 21 | (France) Rodolphe Audran | 11 | | 22 | 14 | 21 | | 10 |
| 22 | (Norway) Hans-Jøran Østreng | | 19 | 8 | | | | 8 |
| 23 | (France) Laurent Bouliou | | | 21 | | 9 | | 8 |
| 24 | (Hungary) Attila Mózer | 17 | 17 | 16 | 16 | 23 | 11 | 8 |
| 25 | (France) Patrick Guillerme | | | | | 12 | | 8 |
| 26 | (Hungary) Zoltán Vass | | | | | | 12 | 6 |
| 27 | (France) Stéphane De Ganay | | | | | 13 | | 4 |
| 28 | (Sweden) Christer Dalmans | | | | 13 | | | 4 |
| 29 | (Norway) Stein Egil Jenssen | | 15 | 23 | 15 | | | 4 |
| 30 | (Norway) Stene Andre Johansen | | | 14 | | | | 3 |
| 31 | (Portugal) Mario Barbosa | | 18 | 15 | 18 | 17 | | 2 |
| 32 | (Latvia) Janis Vegeris | | | | | | 15 | 2 |
| 33 | (Republic of Ireland) Derek Tohill | | | | | 15 | | 2 |
| 34 | (Norway) Ole Kristian Temte | | 16 | 24 | | | | 1 |
| 35 | (Sweden) Daniel Thorén | 16 | | 19 | | | | 0 |
| 36 | (France) Emmanuel Anne | | | | | 18 | | 0 |
| 37 | (France) David Meslier | | | | | 19 | | 0 |
| 38 | (Hungary) "JANKO" | | | | | 22 | | 0 |
| 39 | (France) Pascal Lambec | | | | | 24 | | 0 |
| 40 | (France) Emmanuel Galivel | | | | | 25 | | 0 |
| 41 | (United Kingdom) Mark Flaherty | | | | | 26 | | 0 |
| 42 | (Republic of Ireland) Oliver O'Donovan | | | | | 27 | | 0 |
| Pos. | Driver | GBR (United Kingdom) | NOR (Norway) | SWE (Sweden) | GER (Germany) | FRA (France) | LAT (Latvia) | Points |

| Colour | Result |
|---|---|
| Gold | Winner |
| Silver | Second place |
| Bronze | Third place |
| Green | Points classification |
| Blue | Non-points classification |
| Blue | Non-classified finish (NC) |
| Purple | Retired, not classified (Ret) |
| Red | Did not qualify (DNQ) |
| Red | Did not pre-qualify (DNPQ) |
| Black | Disqualified (DSQ) |
| White | Did not start (DNS) |
| White | Withdrew (WD) |
| White | Race cancelled (C) |
| Blank | Did not practice (DNP) |
| Blank | Did not arrive (DNA) |
| Blank | Excluded (EX) |

^{a} – Loss of 10 championship points.

=== Super1600 ===
| Pos. | Driver | BAR (Spain) | BEL (Belgium) | SWE (Sweden) | GER (Germany) | FRA (France) | LAT (Latvia) | Points |
|---|---|---|---|---|---|---|---|---|
| 1 | (Russia) Aydar Nuriev | 1 | 1 | 2 | 4 | 1 | 11 | 156 |
| 2 | (Hungary) Gergely Márton | 3 | 4 | 5 | 2 | 5 | 6 | 132 |
| 3 | (Russia) Artur Egorov | 2 | 5 | 7 | 6 | 3 | 2 | 117 |
| 4 | (Switzerland) Yuri Belevskiy | 5 | 15 | 3 | 1 | 2 | 4 | 103 |
| 5 | (Russia) Egor Sanin | 11 | 2 | 6 | 7 | 8 | 5 | 97 |
| 6 | (Russia) Timur Shigabutdinov | 4 | 8 | 4 | 11 | 10 | 1 | 90 |
| 7 | (Norway) Marius Bermingrud | 13 | 12 | 1 | 3 | 7 | 8 | 89 |
| 8 | (Russia) Marat Knyazev | 8 | 10 | 11 | 5 | 11 | 10 | 80 |
| 9 | (Estonia) Janno Ligur | 6 | 7 | 9 | 23 | 12 | 3 | 66 |
| 10 | (Czech Republic) Josef Šusta | 10 | 3 | 17 | 8 | 15 | 7 | 50 |
| 11 | (France) Maximilien Eveno | 7 | 9 | 16 | | 4 | | 43 |
| 12 | (Hungary) Zsolt SZIJJ Jolly | 9 | 11 | 19 | 9 | 13 | | 31 |
| 13 | (Czech Republic) Tomáš Krejcík | 15 | 6 | 14 | 10 | 21 | 13 | 28 |
| 14 | (Estonia) Siim Saluri | 22 | 24 | 12 | 13 | 25 | 9 | 20 |
| 15 | (United Kingdom) Jack Thorne | 16 | 16 | 8 | 15 | 14 | | 19 |
| 16 | (Czech Republic) Pavel Vimmer | 21 | 14 | 18 | 12 | 17 | 12 | 15 |
| 17 | (Norway) Espen Isaksætre | | | 10 | | | | 13 |
| 18 | (Poland) Jakub Wyszynski | 14 | 13 | 15 | | | | 9 |
| 19 | (Norway) Ole Henry Steinsholt | 12 | 17 | 13 | 16 | 16 | 17^{b} | 9 |
| 20 | (France) Yvonnick Jagu | | | | | 9 | | 8 |
| 21 | (Poland) Radoslaw Raczkowski | | 20 | 23 | 14 | 18 | 18 | 3 |
| 22 | (Czech Republic) Marcel Suchý | 17 | 18 | 22 | 22 | 19 | 14 | 3 |
| 23 | (Norway) Guro Majormoen | 20 | 21 | 21 | 20 | | 15 | 2 |
| 24 | (France) Jimmy Terpereau | 23 | 19 | 20 | | 6^{a} | | 1 |
| 25 | (Netherlands) Marcel Snoeijers | 19 | 25 | 24 | 17 | 24 | 16 | 1 |
| 26 | (France) Anthony Jan | | | | 18 | 23 | | 0 |
| 27 | (France) Jérémy Lambec | 18 | 22 | | 19 | 20 | | 0 |
| 28 | (Norway) Lars Christian Lote-Rosland | | | | 21 | | | 0 |
| 29 | (France) David Moulin | | | | | 22 | | 0 |
| 30 | (Hungary) András Ferjáncz | | 23 | 25 | | | | 0 |
| Pos. | Driver | BAR (Spain) | BEL (Belgium) | SWE (Sweden) | GER (Germany) | FRA (France) | LAT (Latvia) | Points |

| Colour | Result |
|---|---|
| Gold | Winner |
| Silver | Second place |
| Bronze | Third place |
| Green | Points classification |
| Blue | Non-points classification |
| Blue | Non-classified finish (NC) |
| Purple | Retired, not classified (Ret) |
| Red | Did not qualify (DNQ) |
| Red | Did not pre-qualify (DNPQ) |
| Black | Disqualified (DSQ) |
| White | Did not start (DNS) |
| White | Withdrew (WD) |
| White | Race cancelled (C) |
| Blank | Did not practice (DNP) |
| Blank | Did not arrive (DNA) |
| Blank | Excluded (EX) |

^{a} Loss of 15 championship points – stewards' decision.
^{b} Loss of 5 championship points – stewards' decision.
