= Dmitry Bragin =

Russian racing driver

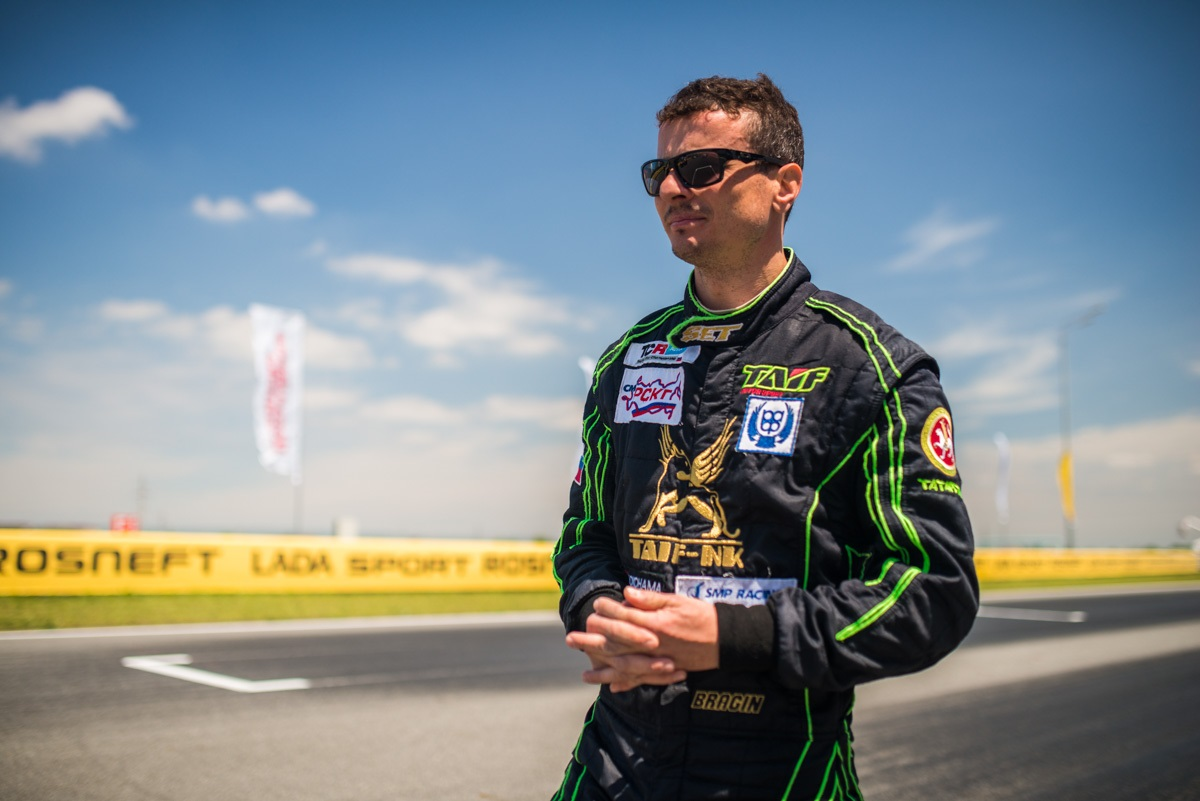
- Nationality: Russian
- Born: Dmitry Aleksandrovich Bragin; 19 May 1982 (age 44) Tolyatti, Russia

Russian Circuit Racing Series career
- Debut season: 2014
- Current team: TAIF Motorsport
- Former teams: Lada Sport
- Best finish: 1st in 2015-2019, and 2022
- Finished last season: 1st

Dmitry Aleksandrovich Bragin (Russian: Дми́трий Алекса́ндрович Бра́гин, born 19 May 1982) is a Russian racing driver currently racing in the Russian Circuit Racing Series. As one of the most decorated racing drivers in his country, he has managed to become a champion in almost all leading motorsport disciplines with 14 championship titles. He is the Russian champion in autocross at (2002), rallycross (2004-2005, 2012), rallying (2008-2009), touring car (2015—2019, 2022), and winter track racing (2017). He also competed in the European Touring Car Cup, winning the single-makes trophy in 2014.
