= Smolensk Ring =

Race track in Russia

- Full Circuit (2010–present)
- Location: Safonovo, Safonovsky District, Smolensk Oblast
- Coordinates: 54°59′19.5″N 33°22′5.4″E
- Broke ground: 2007
- Opened: July 3, 2010; 15 years ago
- Architect: Hermann Tilke
- Major events: Current: Russian Circuit Racing Series (2011–2024, 2026); Former: TCR Europe (2016); FIA European Truck Racing Championship (2010–2013); SMP F4 (2017–2019); Formula Russia (2012–2014)

Full Circuit (2010–present)
- Length: 3.362 km (2.089 mi)
- Turns: 13
- Race lap record: 1:25.408 ( (Russia) Konstantin Tereshchenko, Tatuus FA010, 2012, Formula Abarth)

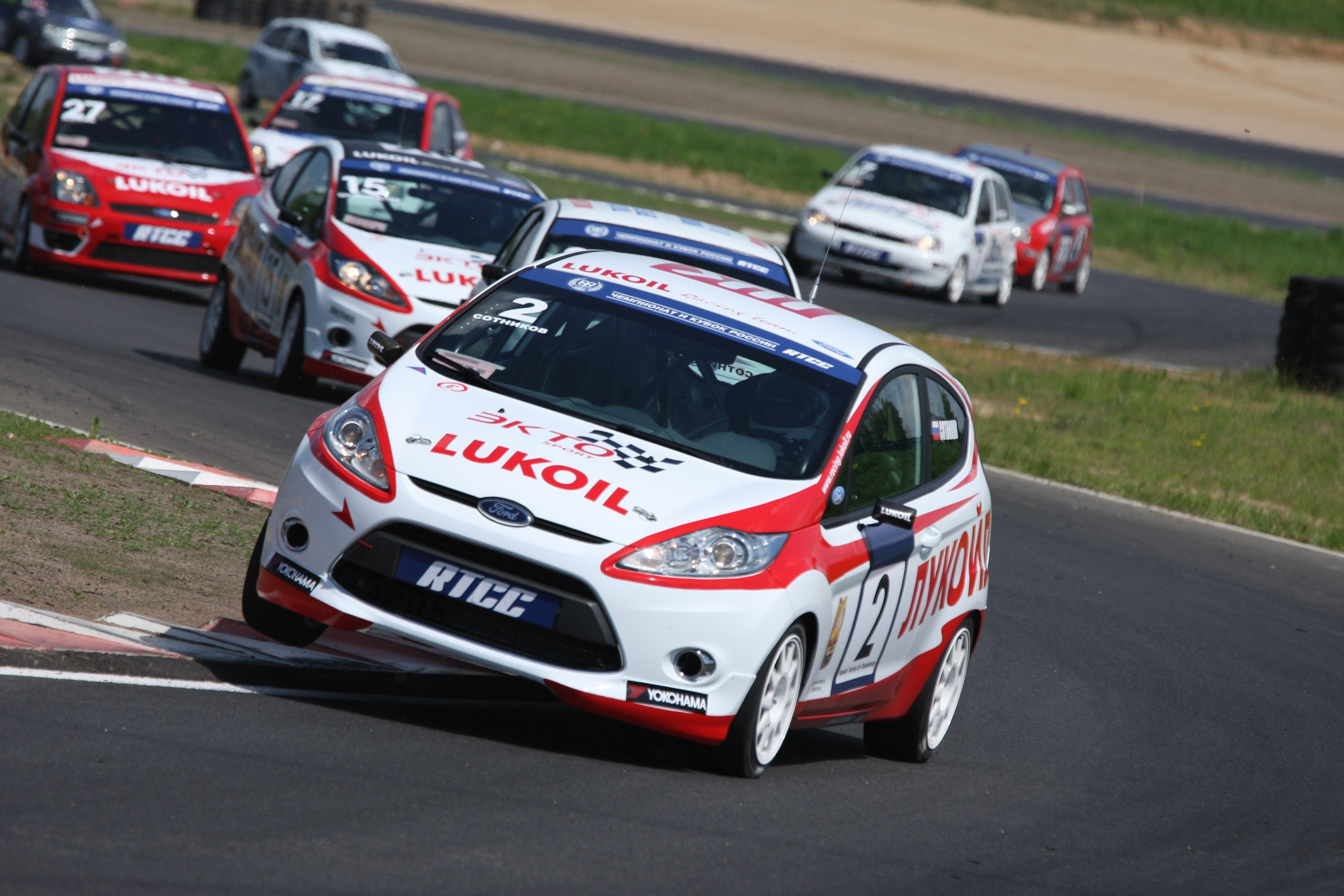
RTCC Ford Fiesta at Smolensk Ring

The Smolensk Ring is a circuit in western Russia near the town of Safonovo in the settlement of Verkhnedneprovsky. It is located 90-kilometre (56 mi) east of its namesake city of Smolensk and about 250-kilometre (160 mi) west of Moscow. The construction of the 3.362 km (2.089 mi) circuit started in 2007, and the inaugural international event was a round of the FIA European Truck Racing Championship in August 2010.

The Smolensk Ring was initially supposed to host rounds of the FIA GT3 European Championship in 2011, however this was later postponed to 2012 because the track didn't complete in time modifications required to garner the necessary FIA track license.

== History ==
The track was designed by Hermann Tilke and his design bureau using the features of the pre-existing landscape of the designated area, resulting in a 3.362 km (2.089 mi), 12–15 m (39–49 ft) wide track containing fast corners, straights and twisty sections.

The race track, with the prerequisite modifications in place, will fulfill the International Automobile Federation (FIA) requirements for a Grade 2 race track, and the first category according to the classification of the Russian Automobile Federation (RAF). With the FIA Grade 2 license, the Smolensk Ring would be able to host motor racing for all classes except Formula One. But it was lastly graded by Grade 4 until 24 May 2020.

Russian Touring Car Championship driver Yuri Semenchev was killed in an accident at the circuit in August 2012.

== Action sports ==
August 2010 — 5 stage FIA European Truck Racing Championship (Truck Battle Russia 2010)
22 May 2011 — 1 stage RTCC (Russian Touring Car Championship)
30–31 July 2011 — 6 stageFIA European Truck Racing Championship (Truck Battle Russia 2011)
9 October 2011 — 7 stage RTCC (Russian Touring Car Championship)

== Lap records ==
As of May 2023, the fastest official race lap records at the Smolensk Ring are listed as:

Category	Time	Driver	Vehicle	Event
Full Circuit (2010–present): 3.362 km (2.089 mi)
Formula Abarth	1:25.408	Konstantin Tereshchenko	Tatuus FA010	2012 Smolensk Formula Russia round
Formula 4	1:27.257	Christian Lundgaard	Tatuus F4-T014	2017 Smolensk SMP F4 round
TCR Touring Car	1:31.618	Dmitry Bragin	CUPRA León Competición TCR	2023 Smolensk RCRS round
GT4	1:32.401	Marat Khairov	BMW M4 GT4	2021 Smolensk RCRS round
Truck racing	1:51.351	Antonio Albacete	MAN TGS	2013 Smolensk ETRC round
