= NRING Circuit =

Race track in Bogorodsk, Russia

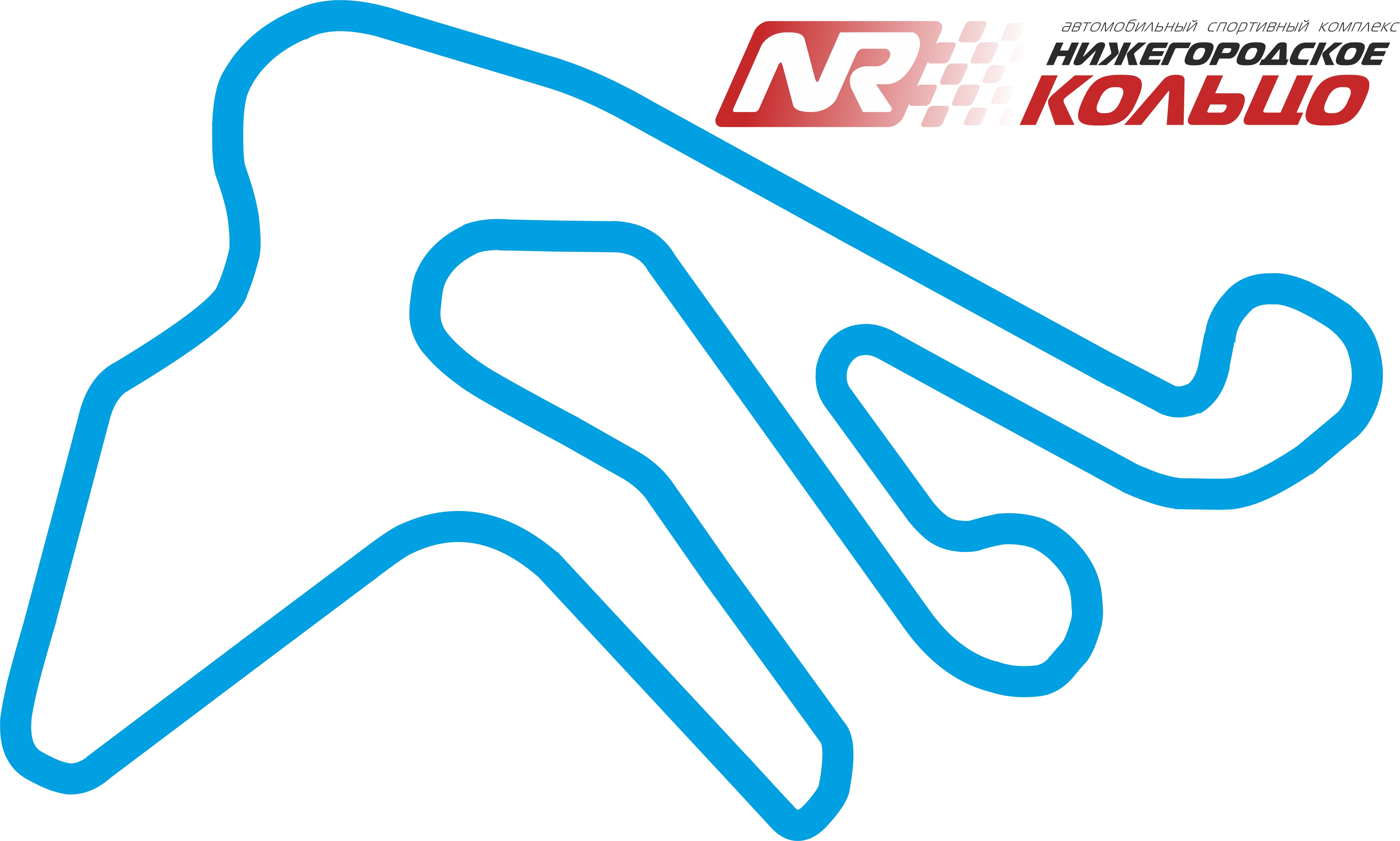
- 'A' Circuit (2010–present)

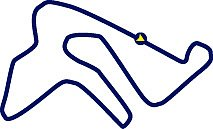
- 'B' Circuit (2010–present)
- Location: (Russia) Bogorodsk
- Coordinates: 56°7′22.88″N 43°35′56.04″E
- Broke ground: 15 December 2008; 17 years ago
- Opened: 3 July 2010; 16 years ago
- Architect: Mikhail Gorbachev & and Andrei Kitov (Moscow Circuit Design Group)
- Major events: Current: Russian Circuit Racing Series (2010–present); SMP F4 Championship (2018–2019, 2025–present); Former: Formula Masters Russia (2014–2015)
- Website: https://nring.ru

'A' Circuit (2010–present)
- Length: 3.222 km (2.002 mi)
- Turns: 15
- Race lap record: 1:37.124 ( (Russia) Vladimir Sheshenin, Lada Vesta TCR, 2017, TCR)

'B' Circuit (2010–present)
- Length: 2.850 km (1.771 mi)
- Turns: 12
- Race lap record: 1:15.489 ( (Russia) Artem Lobanenko, Tatuus F4-T014, 2019, F4)

'C' Circuit (2010–present)
- Length: 2.009 km (1.248 mi)
- Turns: 10

Motorcycle Circuit (2010–present)
- Length: 2.670 km (1.659 mi)
- Turns: 10

The NRING Circuit (Russian: Нижегородское кольцо, romanized: Nizhegorodskoye koltso) is a race track in Bogorodsk, Russia. It is located 35 km (22 mi) southwest of Nizhny Novgorod. The track opened in 2010 as a professional racing venue. It includes four main road courses from 2.009 to 3.222 km (1.248 to 2.002 mi) in length. Furthermore the facility contains a kart track and a training circuit. From 2010, the Russian Circuit Racing Series stages rounds on this track.

== Lap records ==
As of June 2024, the fastest official race lap records at the NRING Circuit are listed as:

Category	Time	Driver	Vehicle	Event
'A' Circuit (2010–present): 3.222 km (2.002 mi)
TCR Touring Car	1:37.124	Vladimir Sheshenin	Lada Vesta TCR	2017 Bogorodsk RCRS round
Super 2000	1:38.757	Artem Kabakov	BMW 320si	2014 Bogorodsk RCRS round
Formula Abarth	1:59.251	Jury Grigorenko	Tatuus FA010	2014 Bogorodsk Formula Masters Russia round
'B' Circuit (2010–present): 2.850 km (1.771 mi)
Formula 4	1:15.489	Artem Lobanenko	Tatuus F4-T014	2019 Bogorodsk SMP F4 round
GT4	1:20.316	Aleksey Nesov	Mercedes-AMG GT4	2024 Bogorodsk RCRS round
TCR Touring Car	1:21.086	Aleksey Dudukalo	Audi RS 3 LMS TCR	2019 Bogorodsk RCRS round
