= Autodrom Moscow =

Racing track near Moscow, Russia

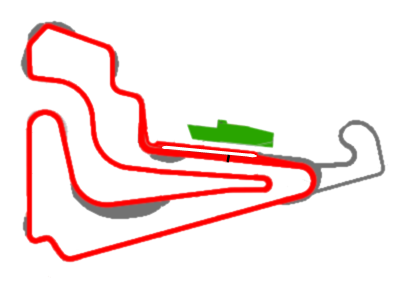
- Full Circuit (2005–present)
- Location: Moscow Region, Russia
- Coordinates: 55°33′47″N 37°59′08″E
- Capacity: 800
- Opened: 2001
- Major events: Former: Russian Circuit Racing Series (2002–2007, 2012, 2019, 2023–2024); SMP F4 (2018–2019); Formula Russia (2012)
- Website: http://www.adm-raceway.ru

Full Circuit (2005–present)
- Length: 3.275 km (2.035 mi)
- Turns: 16
- Race lap record: 1:27.208 ( (Russia) Pavel Bulantsev, Tatuus F4-T014, 2019, F4)

Original Circuit (2001–2004)
- Length: 2.400 km (1.491 mi)
- Turns: 13

The Autodrom Moscow is a race track located near Moscow, 13 km (8.1 mi) from Moscow Circuit Road and 31 km (19 mi) from the city center. The track is constructed in the Miachkovo Airport area which has been in use for motor racing since 2001. After the total reconstruction in 2005, it was the first permanent racing facility in Russia until the Red Ring circuit has been opened in Siberia in 2007. The track design satisfies to FIA Grade III requirements. The raceway equipped with 18 pit boxes, 13×6 m each, race control tower with AMB time keeping system, grandstands for 2000 spectators and a small hotel.

== The circuit ==
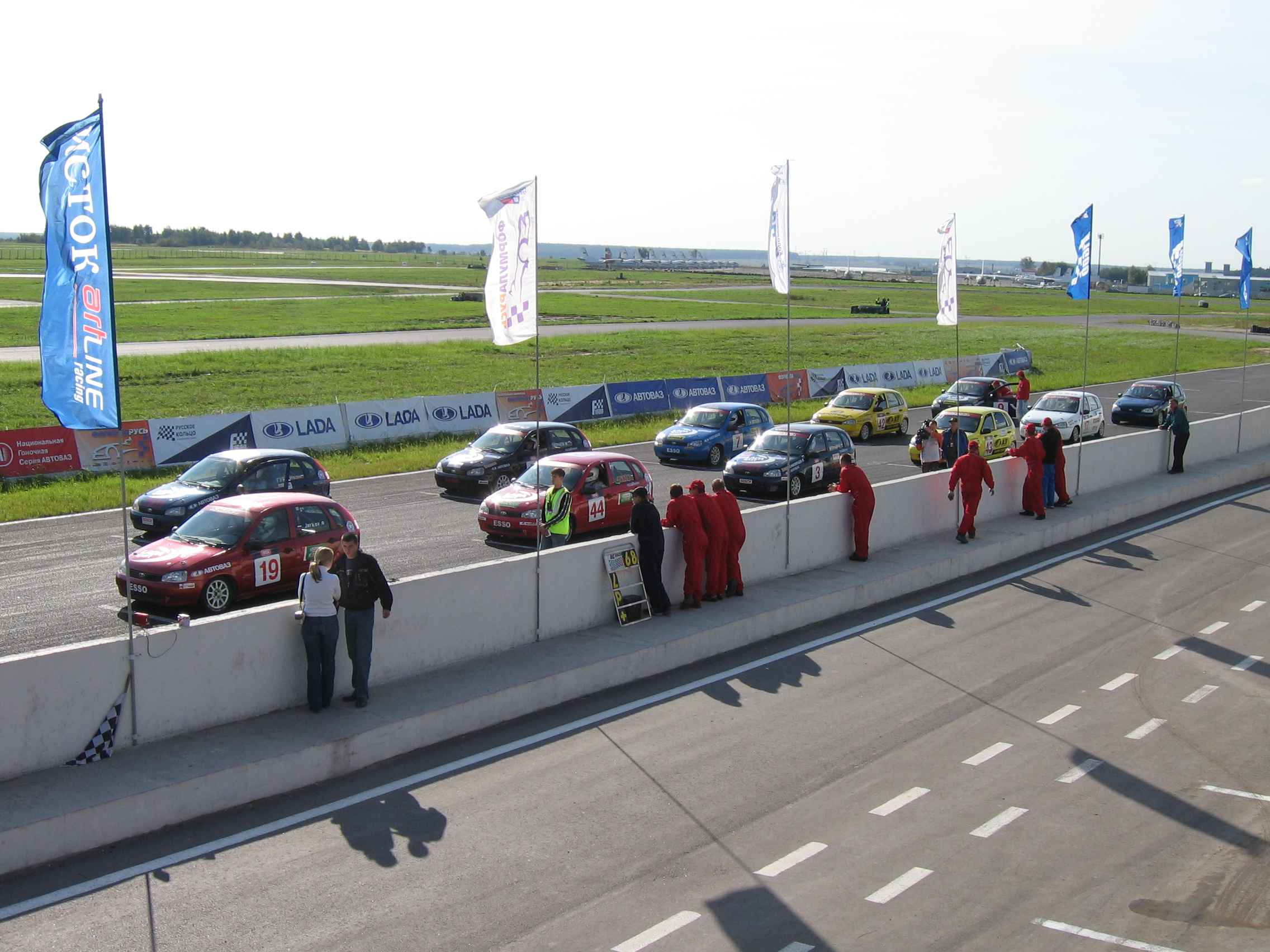
The start of the Russian Circuit Racing Series race in 2006

The Autodrom Moscow has unique feature: is allows racing both clockwise and counterclockwise. Main grandstand have 800 seats. The full length is 3.275 km (2.035 mi).

== Lap records ==
As of August 2019, the fastest official race lap records at the Autodrom Moscow are listed as:

Category	Time	Driver	Vehicle	Event
Full Circuit (2005–present): 3.275 km (2.035 mi)
Formula 4	1:27.208	Pavel Bulantsev	Tatuus F4-T014	2019 Autodrom Moscow SMP F4 round
Formula 3	1:31.792	Oleg Kazakov	Dallara F399	2006 Autodrom Moscow Russian F1600 round
TCR Touring Car	1:33.938	Mikhail Grachev	Lada Vesta Sport TCR	2019 Autodrom Moscow RCRS round
Formula Abarth	1:36.567	David Markosov	Tatuus FA010	2012 Autodrom Moscow Formula Russia round

== See also ==
- Moscow Raceway
