= Kazan Ring =

Race track in Kazan, Russia

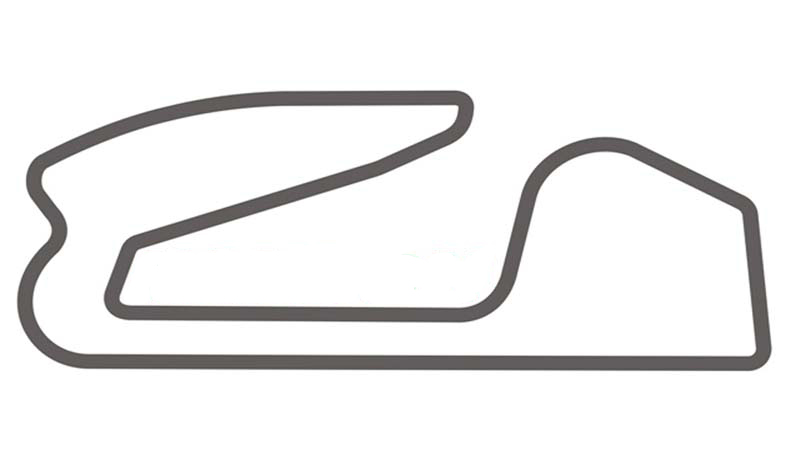
- Full Circuit (2011–present)
- Location: Kazan, Russia
- Coordinates: 55°51′56″N 49°15′57″E
- Broke ground: 2006
- Opened: 2011
- Architect: Hermann Tilke
- Major events: Current: Russian Circuit Racing Series (2011–present); SMP F4 Championship (2019, 2025–present); Former: Formula Masters Russia (2012–2015)

Full Circuit (2011–present)
- Length: 3.476 km (2.160 mi)
- Turns: 11
- Race lap record: 1:20.308 ( (Russia) Jury Grigorenko, Tatuus FA010, 2015, Formula Abarth)

Kazan Ring is a race track, built on the outskirts of Kazan, along its bypass road next with autodrome "High Mountain". The track has a length of 3.476 km (2.160 mi) and a height difference of up to 28 m (92 ft). The track runs counterclockwise. The first competition took place in 2011.

== Lap records ==
The unofficial track record was set in test runs on a Dallara GP2/08, the indicated time is 1:12.870. As of September 2025, the fastest official race lap records at the Kazan Ring are listed as:

| Category | Time | Driver | Vehicle | Event |
Full Circuit (2011–present): 3.476 km (2.160 mi)
| Formula Abarth | 1:20.308 | Jury Grigorenko | Tatuus FA010 | 2015 1st Kazan Formula Masters Russia round |
| Formula 4 | 1:22.119 | Artem Lobanenko | Tatuus F4-T014 | 2019 Kazan SMP F4 round |
| TCR Touring Car | 1:26.456 | Mikhail Simonov | Cupra León VZ TCR | 2025 1st Kazan RCRS round |
| GT4 | 1:26.657 | Stanislav Novikov | Toyota GR Supra GT4 Evo 2 | 2025 2nd Kazan RCRS round |
