= Formula Masters Russia =

Russian single-seater racing series

- Category: Single seaters
- Country: Russia
- Inaugural season: 2012
- Drivers: 14
- Constructors: Tatuus
- Drivers' champion: Ivan Chubarov
- Official website: Formula Masters Russia

Formula Masters Russia (formerly known as Formula Russia) - was a single-seater racing series based in Russia. The series was created in 2011 as an analogue of Formula Abarth.

The intent of the series was to serve as a feeder series for young drivers to set them on the path to racing in Formula One. Each team was provided with engineers and mechanics. All teams used Tatuus FA010 chassis.

== Results ==
Most drivers were Russian-registered. Some foreign drivers competed in the series, including Cypriot driver Vladimiros Tziortzis.

Season	Champion	Second	Third
2012	Konstantin Tereshchenko	Stanislav Safronov	Vladimir Lunkin
2013	Stanislav Burmistrov	Mikhail Loboda	Edward Frolenkov
2014	Mikhail Loboda	Igor Yavorovskiy	Stanislav Burmistrov
2015	Ivan Chubarov	Yuri Grigorenko	Stanislav Safronov

== Competition format ==
The series ran for 8 events per year with 3 races in each.

Format of events

- Friday — free training (4 trainings, 30 minutes each, or 6 trainings, 20 minutes each);
- Saturday — last training (20 minutes), first qualification (15 minutes) и first race (28 minutes + 1 lap);
- Sunday — warming up (10 minutes), second qualification (15 minutes), second race (28 minutes + 1 lap), third race (28 minutes + 1 lap)

The place on the starting grid in first race depends on results of first qualification, the place on the starting grid in second race depends on results of second qualification, the place on the starting grid in third race depends on results of second race, with 6-8 positions inverted.
