= List of motor racing circuits by FIA grade =

Form of autoracing circuit rating

Appendix O to the FIA International Sporting Code defines the inspection and licensing process for auto racing circuits intending to host races sanctioned by the Fédération Internationale de l'Automobile (FIA), motorsport's governing body. The grades issued by the FIA are 1, 2, 3, 4, 6 and FE, depending on the suitability of the circuit for different types and groups of cars, with 1 being the highest grade and the only circuits that can host Formula One races. A circuit holding a particular grade can also host events featuring categories of cars at lower grades. The grades are issued "with the sole purpose of permitting the registration of races on the FIA International Calendar, for the categories of vehicles specified".

Grades 1–4 concern various categories of cars depending on their power to weight ratio, and grade 6 relates to autocross, rallycross and ice racing courses. Grade 5 was previously designated for alternative energy vehicles until September 2022, when this was changed to designate developing circuits with FIA Provisional Circuit Licences.

== Grade One ==
As of November 2026 there are currently 40 Grade One circuits for a total of 61 layouts. Circuits holding Grade One certification may host events involving "Automobiles of Groups D (FIA International Formula) and E (Free Formula) with a weight/power ratio of less than 1 kg/hp." As such, a Grade One certification is required to host events involving Formula One cars. Additional requirements for Grade 1 include advanced medical facilities and staff, barrier safety design, and minimum track lengths and widths.

Circuit	Location	Country	Layout	Length	Expiration date
Albert Park Circuit	Melbourne	Australia	Grand Prix	5.278 km (3.280 mi)	TBR (Note: As of November 2026 Albert Park Circuit does not hold a Grade 1 license, however since it is contracted to appear on the 2027 Formula One World Championship calendar, the Grade 1 license should be renewed.)
Autódromo Hermanos Rodríguez	Mexico City	Mexico	Grand Prix	4.304 km (2.674 mi)	15 December 2028
Autódromo Internacional do Algarve	Portimão	Portugal	Grand Prix	4.684 km (2.911 mi)	31 December 2026 (Note: Autódromo Internacional do Algarve's Grade 1 license will be expired on 31 December 2026, however since it is contracted to appear on the 2027 Formula One World Championship calendar, the Grade 1 license should be renewed.)
Autodromo Internazionale del Mugello	Scarperia e San Piero	Italy	Grand Prix	5.245 km (3.259 mi)	8 May 2028
Autodromo Internazionale Enzo e Dino Ferrari	Imola	Italy	Grand Prix	4.909 km (3.050 mi)	15 March 2027
Autódromo José Carlos Pace	São Paulo	Brazil	Grand Prix	4.309 km (2.677 mi)	30 October 2028
Autodromo Nazionale di Monza	Monza	Italy	Grand Prix	5.793 km (3.600 mi)	29 September 2027
Bahrain International Circuit	Sakhir	Bahrain	Grand Prix	5.412 km (3.363 mi)	18 April 2028
Bahrain International Circuit	Sakhir	Bahrain	Oasis	2.554 km (1.587 mi)	18 April 2028
Bahrain International Circuit	Sakhir	Bahrain	Outer	3.543 km (2.202 mi)	18 April 2028
Bahrain International Circuit	Sakhir	Bahrain	Paddock	3.823 km (2.376 mi)	18 April 2028
Bahrain International Circuit	Sakhir	Bahrain	Endurance	6.299 km (3.914 mi)	18 April 2028
Baku City Circuit	Baku	Azerbaijan	Grand Prix	6.003 km (3.730 mi)	27 April 2029
Chang International Circuit	Buriram	Thailand	Grand Prix	4.554 km (2.830 mi)	7 July 2029
Circuit de Barcelona-Catalunya	Montmeló	Spain	Grand Prix with Chicane	4.675 km (2.905 mi)	18 February 2028
Circuit de Barcelona-Catalunya	Montmeló	Spain	Grand Prix without Chicane	4.657 km (2.894 mi)	18 February 2028
Circuit de Monaco	Monte Carlo	Monaco	Grand Prix	3.340 km (2.075 mi)	20 May 2029
Circuit de Nevers Magny-Cours	Magny-Cours	France	Grand Prix	4.411 km (2.741 mi)	15 May 2028
Circuit de Spa-Francorchamps	Stavelot	Belgium	Grand Prix	7.004 km (4.352 mi)	15 July 2029
Circuit Gilles Villeneuve	Montreal	Canada	Grand Prix	4.361 km (2.710 mi)	16 June 2028
Circuit of the Americas	Austin	United States	Grand Prix	5.513 km (3.426 mi)	31 December 2028
Circuit Paul Ricard	Le Castellet	France	Grand Prix (1C–V2)	5.822 km (3.618 mi)	26 July 2027
Circuit Paul Ricard	Le Castellet	France	2A	4.035 km (2.507 mi)	26 July 2027
Circuit Paul Ricard	Le Castellet	France	2ASC	4.042 km (2.512 mi)	26 July 2027
Circuit Paul Ricard	Le Castellet	France	2ASC Short	3.471 km (2.157 mi)	26 July 2027
Circuit Paul Ricard	Le Castellet	France	3C	3.826 km (2.377 mi)	26 July 2027
Circuit Zandvoort	Zandvoort	Netherlands	Grand Prix	4.259 km (2.646 mi)	31 August 2029
Circuito de Jerez – Ángel Nieto	Jerez de la Frontera	Spain	Grand Prix	4.428 km (2.751 mi)	28 February 2028
Dubai Autodrome	Dubai	United Arab Emirates	Grand Prix	5.390 km (3.349 mi)	9 November 2028
Dubai Autodrome	Dubai	United Arab Emirates	International	4.290 km (2.666 mi)	9 November 2028
Fuji Speedway	Oyama	Japan	Grand Prix	4.563 km (2.835 mi)	11 April 2029
Hockenheimring	Hockenheim	Germany	Grand Prix	4.574 km (2.842 mi)	3 April 2028
Hungaroring	Mogyoród	Hungary	Grand Prix	4.381 km (2.722 mi)	28 July 2028
Igora Drive	Novozhilovo	Russia	Grand Prix	5.183 km (3.221 mi)	9 November 2026
Igora Drive	Novozhilovo	Russia	Short	4.086 km (2.539 mi)	9 November 2026
Indianapolis Motor Speedway	Indianapolis	United States	Grand Prix	4.192 km (2.605 mi)	10 May 2028
Jeddah Corniche Circuit	Jeddah	Saudi Arabia	Grand Prix	6.176 km (3.838 mi)	29 March 2028
Las Vegas Strip Circuit	Las Vegas	United States	Grand Prix	6.120 km (3.803 mi)	16 November 2026 (Note: Las Vegas Strip Circuit's Grade 1 license is set to expire on 16 November 2026, however since it is contracted to appear both on the 2026 Formula One World Championship and 2027 Formula One World Championship calendars, the Grade 1 license should be renewed.)
Lusail International Circuit	Lusail	Qatar	Grand Prix	5.418 km (3.367 mi)	TBR (Note: As of November 2026 Lusail International Circuit does not hold a Grade 1 license, however since it is contracted to appear both on the 2026 Formula One World Championship and 2027 Formula One World Championship calendars, the Grade 1 license should be renewed.)
Madring	Madrid	Spain	Grand Prix	5.474 km (3.401 mi)	10 September 2029
Marina Bay Street Circuit	Singapore	Singapore	Grand Prix	5.077 km (3.155 mi)	1 October 2028
Miami International Autodrome	Miami Gardens	United States	Grand Prix	5.412 km (3.363 mi)	30 April 2029
MotorLand Aragón	Alcañiz	Spain	Grand Prix	5.346 km (3.322 mi)	14 February 2028
MotorLand Aragón	Alcañiz	Spain	FIM	5.080 km (3.157 mi)	14 February 2028
MotorLand Aragón	Alcañiz	Spain	Aerotest FIA	5.202 km (3.232 mi)	14 February 2028
MotorLand Aragón	Alcañiz	Spain	Aerotest FIA+CM	5.255 km (3.265 mi)	14 February 2028
MotorLand Aragón	Alcañiz	Spain	Aerotest FIM	4.935 km (3.066 mi)	14 February 2028
MotorLand Aragón	Alcañiz	Spain	Aerotest FIM+CM	4.988 km (3.099 mi)	14 February 2028
MotorLand Aragón	Alcañiz	Spain	FIA+CM	5.400 km (3.355 mi)	14 February 2028
MotorLand Aragón	Alcañiz	Spain	FIA+CM+Monaco	5.598 km (3.478 mi)	14 February 2028
MotorLand Aragón	Alcañiz	Spain	FIA+Monaco	5.545 km (3.446 mi)	14 February 2028
MotorLand Aragón	Alcañiz	Spain	FIM+CM	5.133 km (3.189 mi)	14 February 2028
MotorLand Aragón	Alcañiz	Spain	FIM+CM+Monaco	5.331 km (3.313 mi)	14 February 2028
Nürburgring	Nürburg	Germany	Grand Prix	5.148 km (3.199 mi)	4 July 2028
Petronas Sepang International Circuit	Sepang	Malaysia	Grand Prix	5.543 km (3.444 mi)	15 March 2029
Red Bull Ring	Spielberg	Austria	Grand Prix	4.326 km (2.688 mi)	2 July 2029
Shanghai International Circuit	Jiading	China	Grand Prix	5.451 km (3.387 mi)	31 December 2026 (Note: Shanghai International Circuit's Grade 1 license expires on 31 December 2026, however since it is contracted to appear on the 2027 Formula One World Championship calendar, at least the Grade 1 license should be renewed.)
Silverstone Circuit	Silverstone	United Kingdom	Grand Prix	5.891 km (3.660 mi)	5 July 2028
Suzuka International Racing Course	Suzuka	Japan	Grand Prix	5.807 km (3.608 mi)	30 March 2029
TOSFED İstanbul Park	Tuzla	Turkey	Grand Prix	5.338 km (3.317 mi)	TBR (Note: As of November 2026 Istanbul Park does not hold a Grade 1 license, however since it is contracted to appear on the 2027 Formula One World Championship calendar, the Grade 1 license should be renewed.)
Yas Marina Circuit	Abu Dhabi	United Arab Emirates	Grand Prix	5.281 km (3.281 mi)	3 December 2027

If a circuit with a Grade 1 layout also has other layouts in other grade/s, will be shaded on other grade lists.

== Grade Two ==
As of November 2026 there are 60 Grade Two circuits for a total of 77 layouts. Circuits holding Grade Two certification may host events involving "Automobiles of Groups D (FIA International Formula) and E (Free formula) with a weight/power ratio of between 1 and 2 kg/hp."

Circuit	Location	Country	Layout	Length	Expiration date
Arlington Street Circuit	Arlington	United States	Grand Prix	4.394 km (2.730 mi)	12 March 2029
Autodrom Most	Most	Czech Republic	Grand Prix	4.212 km (2.617 mi)	8 April 2027
Autodromo di Franciacorta	Castrezzato	Italy	Full	2.519 km (1.565 mi)	1 September 2024 (Note: Autodromo di Franciacorta's Grade 2 license expired on 1 September 2024.)
Autodromo di Vallelunga Piero Taruffi	Campagnano di Roma	Italy	International	4.085 km (2.538 mi)	7 May 2027
Automotodróm Slovakia Ring	Orechová Potôň	Slovakia	Grand Prix Circuit (Variant 4b)	5.935 km (3.688 mi)	10 March 2029
Autopolis	Hita	Japan	Grand Prix	4.674 km (2.904 mi)	27 March 2027
Balaton Park Circuit	Balatonfőkajár	Hungary	Grand Prix	4.115 km (2.557 mi)	25 April 2028
Barber Motorsports Park	Birmingham	United States	Grand Prix	3.830 km (2.380 mi)	26 March 2027
Brands Hatch	West Kingsdown	United Kingdom	Grand Prix	3.916 km (2.433 mi)	22 December 2027
Brands Hatch	West Kingsdown	United Kingdom	Indy	1.944 km (1.208 mi)	22 December 2027
Brno Circuit	Brno	Czech Republic	Grand Prix	5.403 km (3.357 mi)	6 May 2027
Canadian Tire Motorsports Park	Bowmanville	Canada	Grand Prix	3.957 km (2.459 mi)	14 July 2028
Chengdu Tianfu International Circuit	Tianfu New Area	China	Grand Prix	3.265 km (2.029 mi)	29 November 2026
Circuit de Barcelona-Catalunya	Montmeló	Spain	Short+Chicane	2.995 km (1.861 mi)	18 January 2028
Circuit de Barcelona-Catalunya	Montmeló	Spain	Short	2.977 km (1.850 mi)	18 January 2028
Circuit de la Comunitat Valenciana Ricardo Tormo	Valencia	Spain	Grand Prix	4.005 km (2.489 mi)	30 June 2027
Circuit de la Comunitat Valenciana Ricardo Tormo	Valencia	Spain	External	3.036 km (1.886 mi)	30 June 2027
Circuit de la Sarthe	Le Mans	France	Endurance	13.626 km (8.467 mi)	5 June 2029
Circuit de la Sarthe	Le Mans	France	Bugatti	4.185 km (2.600 mi)	10 June 2028
Circuit de Lédenon	Lédenon	France	Full	3.140 km (1.951 mi)	9 November 2025 (Note: Circuit de Lédenon's Grade 2 license expired on 9 November 2025.)
Circuit de Spa-Francorchamps	Stavelot	Belgium	Motorcycle	6.985 km (4.340 mi)	15 July 2026 (Note: Circuit de Spa-Francorchamps's Grade 2 license expired on 15 July 2026.)
Circuit International Automobile Moulay El Hassan	Marrakesh	Morocco	Permanent Circuit	1.701 km (1.057 mi)	1 May 2027
Circuit Paul Armagnac	Nogaro	France	Grand Prix	3.636 km (2.259 mi)	31 October 2027
Circuit Sidi Daoui de Oued Zem	Oued Zem	Morocco	Grand Prix	4.483 km (2.786 mi)	14 July 2026 (Note: Circuit Sidi Daoui de Oued Zem's Grade 2 license expired on 14 July 2026.)
Circuit Zolder	Heusden-Zolder	Belgium	Grand Prix	4.000 km (2.485 mi)	24 April 2027
Circuito de Estoril	Estoril	Portugal	Grand Prix	4.182 km (2.599 mi)	31 December 2026
Circuito de Navarra	Los Arcos	Spain	Grand Prix	4.313 km (2.680 mi)	6 March 2028 (Note: Circuito de Navarra's Grade 2 license was extended to 6 March 2028, and the circuit layout length was still assumed as 3.933 km (2.444 mi) in the list.)
Circuito del Jarama	San Sebastián de los Reyes	Spain	Grand Prix	3.850 km (2.392 mi)	2 March 2027
Circuito di Fiorano	Fiorano Modenese	Italy	Full	2.976 km (1.849 mi)	5 October 2026 (Note: Fiorano Circuit's Grade 2 license expired on 5 October 2026.)
Detroit Street Circuit	Detroit	United States	Grand Prix	2.650 km (1.647 mi)	2 June 2026 (Note: Detroit Street Circuit's Grade 2 license expired on 2 June 2026.)
Dijon-Prenois	Prenois	France	Grand Prix	3.801 km (2.362 mi)	21 April 2029
Donington Park	Castle Donington	United Kingdom	Grand Prix	4.020 km (2.498 mi)	21 December 2027
Donington Park	Castle Donington	United Kingdom	National	3.149 km (1.957 mi)	21 December 2027
Guia Circuit (Note: Guia circuit has a specific Grade 2 license, named as "Grade 2 Restricted".)	Macau	Macau	Grand Prix	6.120 km (3.803 mi)	13 November 2025 (Note: Guia Circuit's Grade 2 Restricted license expired on 13 November 2025.)
Hunan International Circuit	Zhuzhou	China	Grand Prix	3.774 km (2.345 mi)	12 July 2028
Indianapolis Motor Speedway	Indianapolis	United States	Road Course	3.925 km (2.439 mi)	1 May 2028
Inje Speedium	Inje	South Korea	Grand Prix	3.908 km (2.428 mi)	31 December 2026
Jeddah Corniche Circuit	Jeddah	Saudi Arabia	Shortcut	3.452 km (2.145 mi)	24 November 2025 (Note: Jeddah Corniche Circuit's Grade 2 license expired on 24 November 2025.)
Korea International Circuit	Yeongam	South Korea	Grand Prix	5.615 km (3.489 mi)	3 March 2029
Korea International Circuit	Yeongam	South Korea	National 1	3.031 km (1.883 mi)	3 March 2029
Korea International Circuit	Yeongam	South Korea	National 2	2.964 km (1.842 mi)	3 March 2029
Kyalami Circuit	Midrand	South Africa	Grand Prix	4.529 km (2.814 mi)	18 August 2025 (Note: Kyalami's Grade 2 license expired on 18 August 2025.)
Lausitzring	Klettwitz	Germany	Grand Prix	4.345 km (2.700 mi)	12 May 2028
Lausitzring	Klettwitz	Germany	Sprint	3.478 km (2.161 mi)	12 May 2028
Lihpao International Circuit	Taichung	Taiwan	Grand Prix	3.500 km (2.175 mi)	8 May 2026 (Note: Lihpao International Circuit's Grade 2 license expired on 8 May 2026.)
Lime Rock Park	Lakeville	United States	Full	2.448 km (1.521 mi)	6 July 2028
Long Beach Street Circuit	Long Beach	United States	Grand Prix	3.168 km (1.969 mi)	23 September 2027
Mid-Ohio Sports Car Course	Lexington	United States	Grand Prix	3.630 km (2.256 mi)	18 May 2027
Misano World Circuit	Misano Adriatico	Italy	Short	4.048 km (2.515 mi)	12 May 2028
Misano World Circuit	Misano Adriatico	Italy	Long	4.226 km (2.626 mi)	12 May 2028
Mobility Resort Motegi	Motegi	Japan	Grand Prix	4.801 km (2.983 mi)	15 March 2027
Motorsport Arena Oschersleben	Oschersleben	Germany	A Course	3.696 km (2.297 mi)	1 September 2026 (Note: Motorsport Arena Oschersleben's Grade 2 license expired on 1 September 2026.)
Ningbo International Speedpark	Ningbo	China	Full	4.010 km (2.492 mi)	2 August 2028
NOLA Motorsports Park	Avondale	United States	IndyCar A Course	4.330 km (2.691 mi)	17 May 2028
NOLA Motorsports Park	Avondale	United States	A Course (Esses)	4.423 km (2.748 mi)	17 May 2028
Norisring	Nuremberg	Germany	Full	2.162 km (1.343 mi)	11 July 2027
Nürburgring	Nürburg	Germany	Oldtimer	4.579 km (2.845 mi)	4 July 2028
Nürburgring	Nürburg	Germany	Sprint with Arena and F1 Chicane	3.629 km (2.255 mi)	4 July 2028
Okayama International Circuit	Mimasaka	Japan	Grand Prix	3.703 km (2.301 mi)	24 March 2028
Ordos International Circuit	Ordos City	China	Full	3.751 km (2.331 mi)	7 March 2026 (Note: Ordos International Circuit's Grade 2 license expired on 7 March 2026.)
Petronas Sepang International Circuit	Sepang	Malaysia	North	2.807 km (1.744 mi)	15 March 2029
Portland International Raceway	Portland	United States	Full	3.160 km (1.964 mi)	3 June 2027
Red Bull Ring	Spielberg	Austria	Motorcycle	4.348 km (2.702 mi)	2 July 2029
Red Bull Ring	Spielberg	Austria	South National	2.338 km (1.453 mi)	2 July 2029
Road America	Elkhart Lake	United States	Grand Prix	6.514 km (4.048 mi)	5 April 2029
Road Atlanta	Braselton	United States	Long	4.088 km (2.540 mi)	15 April 2027
Sebring International Raceway	Sebring	United States	Full Course	6.019 km (3.740 mi)	31 August 2027
Shougang International Circuit	Qinhuangdao	China	Grand Prix	3.800 km (2.361 mi)	25 June 2027
Silverstone Circuit	Silverstone	United Kingdom	Historic	5.857 km (3.639 mi)	5 July 2028
Silverstone Circuit	Silverstone	United Kingdom	National	2.639 km (1.640 mi)	5 July 2028
Sonoma Raceway	Sonoma	United States	Grand Prix	3.685 km (2.290 mi)	30 March 2028
Sportsland Sugo	Murata	Japan	Grand Prix	3.704 km (2.302 mi)	31 December 2026
St. Petersburg Street Circuit	St. Petersburg	United States	Grand Prix	2.910 km (1.808 mi)	12 March 2027
Surfers Paradise Street Circuit	Gold Coast	Australia	Grand Prix	2.984 km (1.854 mi)	27 October 2029
Suzuka International Racing Course	Suzuka	Japan	East	2.243 km (1.394 mi)	30 March 2028
Sydney Motorsport Park	Eastern Creek	Australia	Brabham Extended	4.500 km (2.796 mi)	25 November 2028
Sydney Motorsport Park	Eastern Creek	Australia	Gardner Grand Prix	3.910 km (2.430 mi)	25 November 2028
Sydney Motorsport Park	Eastern Creek	Australia	Druitt North	2.800 km (1.740 mi)	25 November 2028
The Bend Motorsport Park	Tailem Bend	Australia	GT	7.770 km (4.828 mi)	1 December 2028
The Bend Motorsport Park	Tailem Bend	Australia	International	4.950 km (3.076 mi)	1 December 2028
The Bend Motorsport Park	Tailem Bend	Australia	West	3.410 km (2.119 mi)	1 December 2028
The Thermal Club	Thermal	United States	Twin Palms	4.994 km (3.103 mi)	25 February 2028
Tokachi International Speedway	Sarabetsu	Japan	Grand Prix	5.091 km (3.163 mi)	31 December 2023 (Note: Tokachi International Speedway's Grade 2 license expired 31 December 2023.)
TT Circuit Assen	Assen	Netherlands	Grand Prix	4.555 km (2.830 mi)	8 April 2027
V1 Auto World Tianjin	Tianjin	China	International Professional Driver Circuit	3.720 km (2.312 mi)	20 November 2028
Virginia International Raceway	Alton	United States	Full	5.248 km (3.261 mi)	4 July 2025 (Note: Virginia International Raceway's Grade 2 license expired on 4 July 2025.)
Washington Street Circuit	Washington, D.C.	United States	Grand Prix	2.647 km (1.645 mi)	20 August 2029
WeatherTech Raceway Laguna Seca	Monterey	United States	Grand Prix	3.602 km (2.238 mi)	16 May 2029
Yas Marina Circuit	Abu Dhabi	United Arab Emirates	Corkscrew	4.572 km (2.841 mi)	3 December 2027
Zhejiang International Circuit	Shaoxing	China	Grand Prix	3.200 km (1.988 mi)	30 May 2028
Zhuhai International Circuit	Zhuhai	China	Grand Prix	4.318 km (2.683 mi)	14 November 2028

If a circuit with a Grade 2 layout also has other layouts in other grade/s, will be shaded on other grade lists.

== Grade Three ==
As of November 2026 there are 35 Grade Three circuits for a total of 39 layouts. Circuits holding Grade Three certification may host events involving "Category II Automobiles with a weight/power ratio of between 2 and 3 kg/hp". Since 2020, there is also a specific grade given for Formula E circuits; which is called as "Grade 3E".

Circuit	Location	Country	Layout	Length	Expiration date
A1 Motor Park	Samokov	Bulgaria	Full	3.910 km (2.430 mi)	28 August 2029
Adelaide Street Circuit	Adelaide	Australia	Supercars	3.220 km (2.001 mi)	12 November 2027
Anneau du Rhin (Note: Anneau du Rhin has a specific Grade 3 license for this layout, named as "Grade 3 Restricted", its license expired on 24 September 2026.)	Biltzheim	France	Full	3.620 km (2.249 mi)	24 September 2026
Autodromo di Pergusa	Pergusa	Italy	Grand Prix	4.950 km (3.076 mi)	16 July 2027
Beijing Street Circuit (Note: Beijing Street Circuit has a specific Grade 3 license for this layout, named as "Grade 3 Restricted".)	Beijing	China	Full Street	4.894 km (3.041 mi)	1 October 2029
Autódromo Fernanda Pires da Silva	Estoril	Portugal	Tanque	4.163 km (2.587 mi)	31 January 2026 (Note: Autódromo Fernanda Pires da Silva's Grade 3 license expired on 14 November 2025.)
Autodromo Riccardo Paletti	Varano de' Melegari	Italy	Full	2.350 km (1.460 mi)	9 April 2028
Autódromo Velo Città	Mogi Guaçu	Brazil	Full	3.493 km (2.170 mi)	19 March 2027
Automotodróm Slovakia Ring	Orechová Potôň	Slovakia	Grand Prix Circuit (Variant 4)	5.922 km (3.680 mi)	10 March 2029
Autódromo Internacional Miguel E. Abed	Amozoc	Mexico	International	3.363 km (2.090 mi)	19 August 2027
Bangsaen Street Circuit	Bang Saen Beach	Thailand	Full	3.740 km (2.324 mi)	27 June 2029
Brainerd International Raceway	Brainerd	United States	Competition	3.890 km (2.417 mi)	30 June 2024 (Note: Brainerd International Raceway's Grade 3 license expired 30 June 2024.)
Circuit Chris Amon	Feilding	New Zealand	Grand Prix	3.030 km (1.883 mi)	17 November 2025 (Note: Circuit Chris Amon's Grade 3 license expired 17 November 2025.)
Circuit de Pau-Ville	Pau	France	Grand Prix	2.760 km (1.715 mi)	10 May 2026 (Note: Circuit de Pau-Ville's Grade 3 license expired 10 May 2026.)
Circuit Pau-Arnos	Arnos	France	Full	3.030 km (1.883 mi)	3 August 2024 (Note: Circuit Européen Pau-Arnos's Grade 3 licence expired 3 August 2024.)
Circuito Internacional de Vila Real (Note: Circuito Internacional de Vila Real has a specific Grade 3 license for this layout, named as "Grade 3 Restricted".)	Vila Real	Portugal	Full	4.755 km (2.955 mi)	31 December 2026
Croft Circuit	Dalton-on-Tees	United Kingdom	Full	3.380 km (2.100 mi)	21 June 2025 (Note: Croft Circuit's Grade 3 license expired 21 June 2025.)
Daqing Racing Town	Daqing	China	Full	3.164 km (1.966 mi)	29 August 2027
Dubai Autodrome	Dubai	United Arab Emirates	National	3.560 km (2.212 mi)	9 November 2028
Dubai Autodrome	Dubai	United Arab Emirates	Club	2.460 km (1.529 mi)	9 November 2028
Everland Speedway	Yongin-si	South Korea	Full	4.346 km (2.700 mi)	8 April 2029
Goldenport Park Circuit	Beijing	China	Full	2.391 km (1.486 mi)	7 February 2026 (Note: Goldenport Park Circuit's Grade 3 license expired 7 February 2026.)
Guangdong International Circuit	Sihui	China	Full	2.824 km (1.755 mi)	7 February 2026 (Note: Guangdong International Circuit's Grade 3 license expired 7 February 2026.)
Hampton Downs Motorsport Park	Te Kauwhata	New Zealand	National	2.630 km (1.634 mi)	7 July 2026 (Note: Hampton Downs Motorsport Park's Grade 3 license expired 7 July 2026.)
Hidden Valley Raceway	Darwin	Australia	Full	2.870 km (1.783 mi)	2 December 2028
Highlands Motorsport Park	Cromwell	New Zealand	Full	3.932 km (2.443 mi)	7 July 2026 (Note: Highlands Motorsport Park's Grade 3 license expired 7 July 2026.)
Hockenheimring	Hockenheim	Germany	National	3.736 km (2.321 mi)	3 April 2025 (Note: Hockenheimring's Grade 3 license expired 3 April 2025.)
Homestead–Miami Speedway (Note: Homestead–Miami Speedway has a specific Grade 3 license for its Formula E layout, named as "Grade 3E".)	Homestead	United States	Formula E	3.551 km (2.206 mi)	11 April 2028
Jakarta International e-Prix Circuit (Note: Jakarta International e-Prix Circuit has a specific Grade 3 license, named as "Grade 3E".)	Jakarta	Indonesia	Formula E	2.370 km (1.473 mi)	3 June 2028
Madras International Circuit	Chennai	India	Full	3.717 km (2.310 mi)	21 July 2029
Mandalika International Street Circuit	Central Lombok Regency	Indonesia	Grand Prix	4.313 km (2.680 mi)	29 April 2028
Misano World Circuit (Note: Misano World Circuit has a specific Grade 3 license, named as "Grade 3E".)	Misano Adriatico	Italy	Formula E	3.381 km (2.101 mi)	11 April 2027
MotorLand Aragón	Alcañiz	Spain	National FIA	2.594 km (1.612 mi)	14 February 2028
MotorLand Aragón	Alcañiz	Spain	National FIA+CM	2.640 km (1.640 mi)	14 February 2028
MotorLand Aragón	Alcañiz	Spain	National FIM	2.327 km (1.446 mi)	14 February 2028
MotorLand Aragón	Alcañiz	Spain	National FIM+CM	2.380 km (1.479 mi)	14 February 2028
MotorMall Wanneroo Raceway	Neerabup	Australia	Full	2.410 km (1.498 mi)	9 April 2026 (Note: Wanneroo Raceway's Grade 3 license expired 9 April 2026.)
Mount Panorama Circuit	Bathurst	Australia	Full	6.213 km (3.861 mi)	26 November 2028
New Jersey Motorsports Park	Millville	United States	Thunderbolt	3.621 km (2.250 mi)	10 May 2028
Nürburgring	Nürburg	Germany	Combined	25.378 km (15.769 mi)	27 May 2028
Oulton Park	Little Budworth	United Kingdom	International	4.332 km (2.692 mi)	9 March 2027
Ozarks International Raceway	Gravois Mills	United States	Full	6.389 km (3.970 mi)	1 May 2027
Phillip Island Grand Prix Circuit	Ventnor	Australia	Grand Prix	4.446 km (2.763 mi)	25 September 2026 (Note: Phillip Island Grand Prix Circuit's Grade 3 license expired 25 September 2026.)
Pingtan Ruyi Lake International Circuit	Pingtan Island	China	Full	4.555 km (2.830 mi)	29 August 2027
Queensland Raceway	Willowbank	Australia	Full	3.126 km (1.942 mi)	11 June 2029
Ruapuna Park	Christchurch	New Zealand	Full	3.330 km (2.069 mi)	7 July 2026 (Note: Ruapuna Park's Grade 3 license expired 7 July 2026.)
Sachsenring	Hohenstein-Ernstthal	Germany	Grand Prix	3.645 km (2.265 mi)	8 July 2027
Salzburgring	Plainfeld	Austria	Full	4.241 km (2.635 mi)	7 August 2029
Sandown Raceway	Springvale	Australia	Full	3.104 km (1.929 mi)	16 November 2028
São Paulo Street Circuit (Note: São Paulo Street Circuit has a specific Grade 3 license, named as "Grade 3E", its license expired on 24 March 2026.)	São Paulo	Brazil	Formula E	2.933 km (1.822 mi)	24 March 2026
Shandong Weifang International Circuit	Weifang	China	Full	2.909 km (1.808 mi)	4 July 2027
Snetterton Circuit	Snetterton	United Kingdom	200	3.141 km (1.952 mi)	2 July 2027
Symmons Plains Raceway	Launceston	Australia	Full	2.440 km (1.516 mi)	30 November 2028
Taupo International Motorsport Park	Taupō	New Zealand	Grand Prix	3.321 km (2.064 mi)	7 July 2026 (Note: Taupo International Motorsport Park's Grade 3 license expired 7 July 2026.)
Teretonga Park	Invercargill	New Zealand	Full	2.610 km (1.622 mi)	7 July 2026 (Note: Teretonga Park's Grade 3 license expired 7 July 2026.)
TOSFED İstanbul Park	Tuzla	Turkey	Intermediate	3.925 km (2.439 mi)	16 May 2025 (Note: TOSFED İstanbul Park's Grade 1 license expired 12 November 2023 and Grade 3 license expired 16 May 2025, however since it is contracted to appear on the 2027 F1 Calendar, at least the Grade 1 license should be renewed.)
Townsville Street Circuit	Townsville	Australia	Full	3.220 km (2.001 mi)	9 July 2028
V1 Auto World Tianjin	Tianjin	China	Professional Driver Experience Circuit	2.500 km (1.553 mi)	20 November 2028

== Grade Four ==
As of November 2026 there are 11 Grade Four circuits for a total of 11 layouts. Circuits holding Grade Four certification may host events involving "Category I Automobiles. Category II Automobiles with a weight/power ratio higher than 3 kg/hp."

Circuit	Location	Country	Layout	Length	Expiration date
Autódromo Hermanos Rodríguez	Mexico City	Mexico	Grand Prix Circuit without Foro Sol	4.256 km (2.645 mi)	15 December 2028
Autódromo Internacional Ayrton Senna (Goiânia)	Goiânia	Brazil	Full	3.835 km (2.383 mi)	30 September 2025 (Note: Autódromo Internacional Ayrton Senna (Goiânia)'s Grade 4 license expired 30 September 2025.)
Autódromo Internacional de Brasília	Brasília	Brazil	Full	5.380 km (3.343 mi)	31 December 2026
Autódromo Oscar y Juan Gálvez	Buenos Aires	Argentina	No.6	4.101 km (2.548 mi)	4 October 2027
Autódromo Víctor Borrat Fabini	El Pinar	Uruguay	Perimetral	3.120 km (1.939 mi)	30 January 2025 (Note: Autódromo Víctor Borrat Fabini's Grade 4 license expired 30 January 2025.)
Automotodrom Grobnik	Čavle	Croatia	Grand Prix	4.168 km (2.590 mi)	5 September 2026 (Note: Automotodrom Grobnik's Grade 4 license expired 5 September 2026.)
Goodwood Circuit (Note: Goodwood Circuit has a specific Grade 4 license, named as "Grade 4 Historic".)	Goodwood House	United Kingdom	Full	3.830 km (2.380 mi)	30 August 2025 (Note: Goodwood Circuit's Grade 4 Historic license expired 30 August 2025.)
Guizhou Junchi International Circuit	Guizhou	China	Full	2.008 km (1.248 mi)	7 February 2026 (Note: Guizhou Junchi International Circuit's Grade 4 license expired 7 February 2026.)
Jiangsu Wantrack International Circuit	Nanjing	China	Full	2.014 km (1.251 mi)	7 February 2026 (Note: Jiangsu Wantrack International Circuit's Grade 4 license expired 7 February 2026.)
Jyllands-Ringen	Silkeborg	Denmark	Full	2.300 km (1.429 mi)	30 May 2028
Kari Motor Speedway	Coimbatore	India	Full	2.100 km (1.305 mi)	31 December 2027
Knockhill Racing Circuit	Fife	United Kingdom	Full Clockwise	2.090 km (1.299 mi)	26 June 2028
Mondello Park	Caragh	Ireland	International	3.503 km (2.177 mi)	1 July 2026 (Note: Mondello Park's Grade 4 license expired 1 July 2026.)
Pembrey Circuit	Pembrey	United Kingdom	Full	2.348 km (1.459 mi)	13 December 2026
Porsche Leipzig Circuit	Leipzig	Germany	Large Circuit	3.723 km (2.313 mi)	25 November 2028
Ring Knutstorp	Kågeröd	Sweden	Full	2.079 km (1.292 mi)	20 March 2027
Shanghai Tianma Circuit	Songjiang	China	Full	2.063 km (1.282 mi)	7 February 2026 (Note: Shanghai Tianma Circuit's Grade 4 license expired 7 February 2026.)
Thruxton Circuit	Thruxton	United Kingdom	Full	3.792 km (2.356 mi)	12 February 2029
Tor Poznań (Note: Tor Poznań has a specific Grade 4 license for this layout, named as "Grade 4 Restricted".)	Przeźmierowo	Poland	Full	4.083 km (2.537 mi)	31 March 2027
Xi'an Automobile University Track	Xi'an	China	Full	2.450 km (1.522 mi)	9 July 2025 (Note: Xi'an Automobile University Track's Grade 4 license expired 9 July 2025.)
Xiamen International Circuit	Xiamen	China	Full	1.696 km (1.054 mi)	7 February 2026 (Note: Xiamen International Circuit's Grade 4 license expired 7 February 2026.)

== Grade Six ==
As of November 2026 there are 23 Grade Six circuits for a total of 27 layouts. Grade Six is split into three parts: Grade 6A for all classes of autocross vehicles, Grade 6R for all classes of rallycross vehicles and Grade 6RW for the circuits used in FIA World Rallycross Championship and FIA European Rallycross Championship.

Circuit	Location	Country	Layout	Length	Expiration date
Aspar Circuit	Algemesí	Spain	Autocross (6A)	0.835 km (0.519 mi)	24 October 2027
Autocross Nová Paka	Nová Paka	Czech Republic	Autocross (6A)	0.930 km (0.578 mi)	2 May 2029
Autocross Saint Georges de Montaigu	Saint-Georges-de-Montaigu	France	Autocross (6A)	0.919 km (0.571 mi)	11 July 2028
Autocross Saint Igny de Vers	Saint-Igny-de-Vers	France	Autocross (6A)	0.882 km (0.548 mi)	31 August 2028
Biķernieki Complex Sports Base	Riga	Latvia	Rallycross (6RW)	1.294 km (0.804 mi)	6 May 2029
Circuit Auto Cross Du Boutariq	Veynes	France	Autocross (6A)	0.981 km (0.610 mi)	3 September 2025 (Note: Circuit Auto Cross Du Boutariq's Grade 6A license expired 3 September 2025.)
Circuit D'autocross De Mollerussa	Mollerussa	Spain	Autocross (6A)	0.985 km (0.612 mi)	19 September 2028
Circuit de Barcelona-Catalunya	Montmelo	Spain	Rallycross (6R)	1.137 km (0.706 mi)	27 October 2025 (Note: Circuit de Barcelona Catalunya's Grade 6A license expired 27 October 2025.)
Circuit de Lohéac	Lohéac	France	Rallycross (6R)	1.088 km (0.676 mi)	27 August 2029
Circuit des Ducs	Essay	France	Rallycross (6R)	1.012 km (0.629 mi)	23 February 2026 (Note: Circuit des Ducs's Grade 6R license expired 23 February 2026.)
Circuit Jules Tacheny Mettet	Mettet	Belgium	Rallycross (6R)	1.031 km (0.641 mi)	4 August 2027
Lousada International Circuit	Lousada	Portugal	Rallycross (6RW)	0.910 km (0.565 mi)	29 May 2028
Cross Arena Prerov	Přerov	Czech Republic	Autocross (6A)	1.000 km (0.621 mi)	24 August 2028
Estering	Buxtehude	Germany	Rallycross (6R)	0.952 km (0.592 mi)	15 May 2028
Foz Côa Automóvel Clube	Vila Nova de Foz Côa	Portugal	Autocross (6A)	1.000 km (0.621 mi)	3 October 2028
Hong Kong Central Harbourfront Circuit	Hong Kong	Hong Kong	Rallycross (6R)	0.802 km (0.498 mi)	10 November 2026
Höljesbanan	Höljes	Sweden	Rallycross (6RW)	1.210 km (0.752 mi)	29 June 2029
Igora Drive	Novozhilovo	Russia	Rallycross (6R)	1.216 km (0.756 mi)	31 December 2023 (Note: Igora Drive's Grade 6R license expired 31 December 2023 for its rallycross layout.)
Killarney Motor Racing Complex	Cape Town	South Africa	Rallycross (6R)	1.060 km (0.659 mi)	6 October 2026
Kymi Ring	Kausala	Finland	Rallycross (6RW)	1.150 km (0.715 mi)	20 August 2028
Lånkebanen	Hell	Norway	Rallycross (6R)	1.060 km (0.659 mi)	11 August 2025 (Note: Lånkebanen's Grade 6R license expired 11 August 2025.)
Lydden Hill Race Circuit	Wootton	United Kingdom	Rallycross (6R)	1.353 km (0.841 mi)	17 June 2023 (Note: Lydden Hill Race Circuit's Grade 6R license expired 17 June 2023.)
Maggiora Offroad Arena - Autodromo Pragiarolo	Maggiora	Italy	Rallycross (6R)	1.016 km (0.631 mi)	31 December 2026
Maggiora Offroad Arena - Autodromo Pragiarolo	Maggiora	Italy	Autocross (6A)	0.980 km (0.609 mi)	31 December 2026
Matschenberg Offroad Arena	Bautzen	Germany	Autocross (6A)	0.820 km (0.510 mi)	15 June 2028
Musa Bauska	Bauska	Latvia	Autocross (6A)	0.940 km (0.584 mi)	24 May 2028
Nürburgring	Nürburg	Germany	Rallycross (6R)	1.029 km (0.639 mi)	10 November 2025 (Note: The Nürburgring's Grade 6R license expired 10 November 2025.)
Nyirád Racing Center	Nyirád	Hungary	Rallycross (6RW)	1.290 km (0.802 mi)	15 May 2028
Nyirád Racing Center	Nyirád	Hungary	Autocross (6A)	1.040 km (0.646 mi)	15 May 2028
Pista Automóvel de Montalegre	Montalegre	Portugal	A Rallycross (6R)	0.945 km (0.587 mi)	15 September 2029
Pista Automóvel de Montalegre	Montalegre	Portugal	B Rallycross (6R)	1.146 km (0.712 mi)	15 September 2029
Seelow Autocross Circuit	Seelow	Germany	Autocross (6A)	0.810 km (0.503 mi)	8 May 2029
TOSFED İstanbul Park	Tuzla	Turkey	Rallycross (6R)	1.346 km (0.836 mi)	8 November 2027
Vilkyciai Circuit	Priekulė	Lithuania	Rallycross (6R)	0.872 km (0.542 mi)	16 April 2028
Vilkyciai Circuit	Priekulė	Lithuania	Autocross (6A)	1.063 km (0.661 mi)	16 April 2028

== Grade FE ==
As of November 2026 there are 10 Grade FE circuits for a total of 10 layouts.

Circuit	Location	Country	Layout	Length	Expiration date
Autódromo Hermanos Rodríguez	Mexico City	Mexico	Formula E	2.606 km (1.619 mi)	10 January 2029
Circuit de Monaco	Monte Carlo	Monaco	Formula E	3.340 km (2.075 mi)	7 May 2027
Circuito del Jarama	San Sebastián de los Reyes	Spain	Formula E	3.931 km (2.443 mi)	20 March 2029
ExCeL London Circuit	Royal Docks	United Kingdom	Formula E	2.252 km (1.399 mi)	24 July 2028
Jeddah Corniche Circuit	Jeddah	Saudi Arabia	Formula E	3.001 km (1.865 mi)	14 January 2028
Miami International Autodrome	Miami Gardens	United States	MIA Loop	2.606 km (1.619 mi)	29 January 2029
Sanya Street Circuit	Sanya	China	Formula E	2.520 km (1.566 mi)	18 June 2029
Shanghai International Circuit	Jiading	China	West Long	3.051 km (1.896 mi)	23 May 2027
Tempelhof Airport Street Circuit	Berlin	Germany	Formula E	2.343 km (1.456 mi)	10 May 2027
Tokyo Street Circuit	Tokyo	Japan	Formula E	2.575 km (1.600 mi)	28 March 2027

== See also ==
- List of motor racing tracks
