= Anneau du Rhin =

Racing track in Biltzheim, France

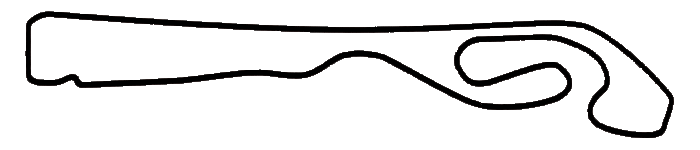
- Circuit de Vitesse (2011–present)
- Location: Biltzheim, Haut-Rhin, Grand Est, France
- Coordinates: 47°56′59″N 7°25′19″E
- FIA Grade: 3R
- Owner: François Rinaldi
- Broke ground: 1996
- Opened: 1996
- Major events: Former: Fun Cup (2015, 2020–2024); WTCR Race of Alsace Grand Est (2022)
- Website: http://www.anneau-du-rhin.com/stages-de-pilotage/

Circuit de Vitesse (2011–present)
- Length: 3.621 km (2.250 mi)
- Turns: 17
- Race lap record: 1:28.334 ( (Spain) Mikel Azcona, Hyundai Elantra N TCR, 2022, TCR)

Original Circuit (1996–present)
- Length: 2.919 km (1.814 mi)
- Turns: 11

The Anneau du Rhin is a 3.621 km (2.250 mi) racing circuit situated near Biltzheim, France, about 35 km (22 mi) north of Mulhouse. It is used for racing and club sport events, track days and presentations.

== History ==
The original 2.919 km (1.814 mi) circuit was planned and built in 1996 by Marc Rinaldi on the site of a former hunting ground and is now managed by his son François Rinaldi. It is located 2 km (1.2 mi) southeast of the village of Biltzheim. In 2004, the route was extended with a western loop. The route was completely resurfaced in August 2011 and widened by one meter. Since 2013, there has been an option for motorcycles with a length of 3.621 km (2.250 mi), which can be extended to up to 4 km (2.5 mi) if necessary.

== Events ==
On 14 April 2022, it was announced that Anneau du Rhin would host a round of the World Touring Car Cup on 6–7 August.

== Layout configurations ==
Anneau du Rhin Layout Configurations
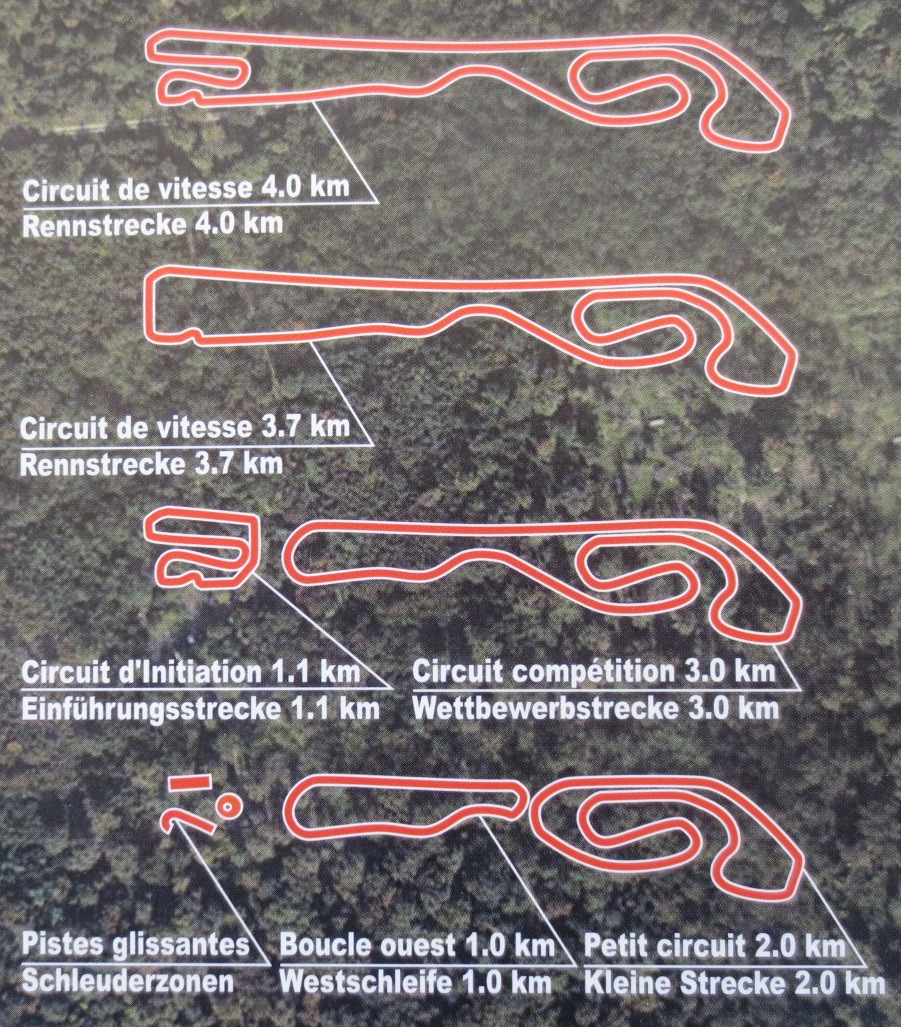
All layout configurations of Anneau du Rhin

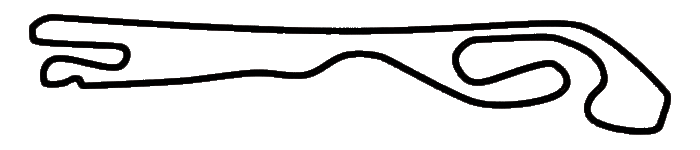
Full layout of Anneau du Rhin

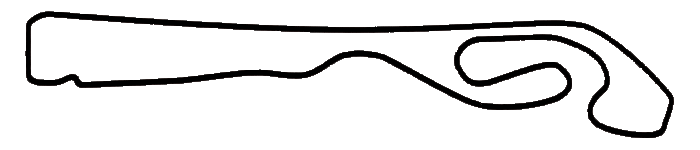
Racing layout of Anneau du Rhin (2011–present)

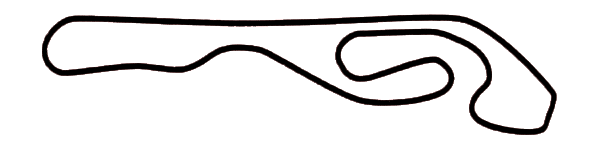
Original layout of Anneau du Rhin (1996–present)

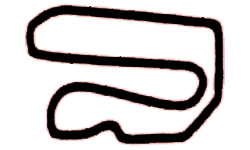
Karting layout of Anneau du Rhin

== Lap records ==
As of August 2022, the fastest official race lap records at the Anneau du Rhin are listed as:

Category	Time	Driver	Vehicle	Event
Circuit de Vitesse (2011–present): 3.621 km (2.250 mi)
TCR Touring Car	1:28.334	Mikel Azcona	Hyundai Elantra N TCR	2022 WTCR Race of Alsace Grand Est
