= 2026 F4 Chinese Championship =

The 2026 F4 Chinese Championship (Eastroc FIA F4 Chinese Championship) was the twelfth season of the F4 Chinese Championship. It started on 17 April at Shanghai International Circuit and concluded on 18 October at Zhuhai International Circuit.

== Teams and drivers ==
Teams	No.	Drivers	Status	Rounds
(China) Yinqiao Geeke Racing	1	(China) Tian Feng	M	3–6
(China) Yinqiao Geeke Racing	6	(China) Li Huiwei	G	2
(China) Yinqiao Geeke Racing	57	(China) Qi Diqin	C	All
(China) Kai Fei Motorsport	2	(Hong Kong) Patrick Tsang	M	1, 6
(China) Kai Fei Motorsport	33	(Hong Kong) Andy Law	M	All
(China) Frankenstein by Pointer Racing (Note: Round 1) (China) Pointer Racing (Note: Round 3)	3	(China) Liu Taiji	C	1, 3
(China) Frankenstein by Pointer Racing (China) Pointer Racing	23	(China) Yuanyang Zeshi	C	1, 3–4
(China) Zhizhen Pointer Racing	7	(China) Wang Zejun	C	3, 6
(China) Black Blade Academy	8	(China) Yang Peng	C	4, 6
(China) Black Blade Academy	12	(Hong Kong) Qian Fanghang		6
(China) SHE Power Racing	9	(China) Shi Wei	C	1
(China) Blackjack Racing RFN	10	(Macau) Vernice Lao		4
(China) Blackjack Racing RFN	18	(China) Chen Zhuyuan		All
(China) Blackjack Racing RFN	22	(China) Huang Chujian	C	1
(China) Blackjack Racing RFN	68	(Russia) Viktor Turkin	M	5–6
(China) Kai Fei ACADEMY	15	(China) Alfred Lao	C	All
(China) Kai Fei ACADEMY	72	(China) Yu Haoxi		6
(China) Venom Motorsport	16	(China) Huang Xiaofeng	C	All
(China) Venom Motorsport	24	(China) Yang Peng	C	1–3
(China) Asia Racing Team RFN	17	(China) Josh Feng		All
(China) Asia Racing Team RFN	27	(Russia) Timur Shagaliev (Note: Shagaliev is Russian, but he competed as a neutral competitor from rounds 1–3 as Russian national emblems were banned by the FIA following the Russian invasion of Ukraine. The ban was lifted on 13 August 2026.)		All
(China) GYT Racing	19	(China) Tu Yate	C	1
(China) Asia Racing Team	21	(France) Héloïse Goldberg		6
(China) Asia Racing Team	36	(China) Yang Kaiwen	C	6
(China) Black Blade GP	23	(China) Cheng Meng	C	2
(China) Black Blade GP	25	(China) Zhang Jun	C	All
(China) Black Blade GP	95	(United States) Ethan Liu		4
(China) Black Blade GP	99	(China) Jiang Wei	M	1, 3, 5–6
(China) Champ Motorsport	26	(Hong Kong) Jason Chow	C	All
(China) Champ Motorsport	96	(Hong Kong) Ken Chow	M	All
(China) CHAMP Academy	28	(Hong Kong) Kimi Chan		All
(China) CHAMP Academy	67	(China) David Zhao		2–4, 6
(China) Black Blade Racing	32	(China) Lucas Yu		All
(China) Black Blade Racing	63	(China) Chen Sicong	C	All
(China) T-1 Racing	37	(China) Liu Shangqing		3–6
(China) Henmax Motorsport	61	(Hong Kong) Hon Yingfu	M	6
(China) Black Blade Junior	66	(China) Sun Anzhe		6
(China) Black Blade Junior	95	(United States) Ethan Liu		6

Icon	Class
M	Masters Class
C	CFGP Class
G	Guest

== Race calendar and results ==
The provisional calendar featuring 6 rounds and 24 races was published on 30 December 2025 with minor tweaks announced on 10 February 2026.

Round		Circuit	Date	Pole position	Fastest lap	Winning driver	Winning team	Masters winner	Supporting
1	R1	Shanghai International Circuit, Shanghai	18 April	(Hong Kong) Kimi Chan	(Hong Kong) Kimi Chan	(Hong Kong) Kimi Chan	(China) CHAMP Academy	(Hong Kong) Andy Law	China GT Championship; Toyota Gazoo Racing China GR86 Cup
1	R2	Shanghai International Circuit, Shanghai	18 April		(Hong Kong) Kimi Chan	(Hong Kong) Kimi Chan	(China) CHAMP Academy	(China) Jiang Wei	China GT Championship; Toyota Gazoo Racing China GR86 Cup
1	R3	Shanghai International Circuit, Shanghai	19 April	(Hong Kong) Kimi Chan	(Hong Kong) Kimi Chan	(Hong Kong) Kimi Chan	(China) CHAMP Academy	(Hong Kong) Andy Law	China GT Championship; Toyota Gazoo Racing China GR86 Cup
1	R4	Shanghai International Circuit, Shanghai	19 April		(Hong Kong) Kimi Chan	Timur Shagaliev	(China) Asia Racing Team RFN	(Hong Kong) Andy Law	China GT Championship; Toyota Gazoo Racing China GR86 Cup
2	R5	V1 Auto World Tianjin, Tianjin	23 May	Timur Shagaliev	(China) Josh Feng	(China) Josh Feng	(China) Asia Racing Team RFN	(Hong Kong) Andy Law	China Circuit Sprint Challenge
2	R6	V1 Auto World Tianjin, Tianjin	23 May		(China) David Zhao	(China) David Zhao	(China) CHAMP Academy	(Hong Kong) Ken Chow	China Circuit Sprint Challenge
2	R7	V1 Auto World Tianjin, Tianjin	24 May	Timur Shagaliev	(China) Josh Feng	(Hong Kong) Kimi Chan	(China) CHAMP Academy	(Hong Kong) Andy Law	China Circuit Sprint Challenge
2	R8	V1 Auto World Tianjin, Tianjin	24 May		(China) Chen Zhuyuan	(China) David Zhao	(China) CHAMP Academy	(Hong Kong) Andy Law	China Circuit Sprint Challenge
3	R9	Ningbo International Circuit, Ningbo	27 June	(Hong Kong) Kimi Chan	Timur Shagaliev	(China) Chen Sicong	(China) Black Blade Racing	(Hong Kong) Andy Law	Lotus Cup China; Lynk&Co City Racing
3	R10	Ningbo International Circuit, Ningbo	27 June		(Hong Kong) Kimi Chan	(China) David Zhao	(China) CHAMP Academy	(China) Jiang Wei	Lotus Cup China; Lynk&Co City Racing
3	R11	Ningbo International Circuit, Ningbo	28 June	(China) Lucas Yu	Timur Shagaliev	Timur Shagaliev	(China) Asia Racing Team RFN	(China) Jiang Wei	Lotus Cup China; Lynk&Co City Racing
3	R12	Ningbo International Circuit, Ningbo	28 June		(China) David Zhao	(Hong Kong) Kimi Chan	(China) CHAMP Academy	(China) Jiang Wei	Lotus Cup China; Lynk&Co City Racing
4	R13	Chengdu Tianfu International Circuit, Chengdu	29 August	(Hong Kong) Kimi Chan	(Russia) Timur Shagaliev	(Russia) Timur Shagaliev	(China) Asia Racing Team RFN	(Hong Kong) Ken Chow	Toyota Gazoo Racing China GR86 Cup
4	R14	Chengdu Tianfu International Circuit, Chengdu	29 August		(China) Josh Feng	(China) Josh Feng	(China) Asia Racing Team RFN	(Hong Kong) Andy Law	Toyota Gazoo Racing China GR86 Cup
4	R15	Chengdu Tianfu International Circuit, Chengdu	30 August	(China) David Zhao	(Russia) Timur Shagaliev	(Russia) Timur Shagaliev	(China) Asia Racing Team RFN	(Hong Kong) Ken Chow	Toyota Gazoo Racing China GR86 Cup
4	R16	Chengdu Tianfu International Circuit, Chengdu	30 August		(Russia) Timur Shagaliev	(China) Lucas Yu	(China) Black Blade Racing	(Hong Kong) Andy Law	Toyota Gazoo Racing China GR86 Cup
5	R17	Hunan International Circuit, Zhuzhou	26 September	(Hong Kong) Kimi Chan	(Hong Kong) Kimi Chan	(China) Lucas Yu	(China) Black Blade Racing	(Russia) Viktor Turkin	Stand-alone event
5	R18	Hunan International Circuit, Zhuzhou	26 September		(Hong Kong) Kimi Chan	(Hong Kong) Kimi Chan	(China) CHAMP Academy	(Russia) Viktor Turkin	Stand-alone event
5	R19	Hunan International Circuit, Zhuzhou	27 September	(Hong Kong) Kimi Chan	(Hong Kong) Kimi Chan	(Hong Kong) Kimi Chan	(China) CHAMP Academy	(Russia) Viktor Turkin	Stand-alone event
5	R20	Hunan International Circuit, Zhuzhou	27 September		(China) Chen Sicong	(China) Chen Sicong	(China) Black Blade Racing	(Hong Kong) Ken Chow	Stand-alone event
6	R21	Zhuhai International Circuit, Zhuhai	17 October	(Russia) Timur Shagaliev	(Russia) Timur Shagaliev	(Russia) Timur Shagaliev	(China) Asia Racing Team RFN	(Russia) Viktor Turkin	Stand-alone event
6	R22	Zhuhai International Circuit, Zhuhai	17 October		(Russia) Timur Shagaliev	(Hong Kong) Kimi Chan	(China) CHAMP Academy	(Russia) Viktor Turkin	Stand-alone event
6	R23	Zhuhai International Circuit, Zhuhai	18 October	(Russia) Timur Shagaliev	(Russia) Timur Shagaliev	(Russia) Timur Shagaliev	(China) Asia Racing Team RFN	(China) Jiang Wei	Stand-alone event
6	R24	Zhuhai International Circuit, Zhuhai	18 October		(Hong Kong) Kimi Chan	(Hong Kong) Kimi Chan	(China) CHAMP Academy	(Russia) Viktor Turkin	Stand-alone event

== Championship standings ==
Points were awarded to the top ten classified finishers as follows:

Position	**1st**	**2nd**	**3rd**	**4th**	**5th**	**6th**	**7th**	**8th**	**9th**	**10th**
Points	25	18	15	12	10	8	6	4	2	1

=== Drivers' Championship ===
Pos	Driver	SIC				V1T				NIC				CTC				HIC				ZIC				Pts
Pos	Driver	R1	R2	R3	R4	R5	R6	R7	R8	R9	R10	R11	R12	R13	R14	R15	R16	R17	R18	R19	R20	R21	R22	R23	R24	Pts
1	(Russia) Timur Shagaliev	Ret	3	3	1	**3**	2	**2**	2	2	Ret	1	6	1	3	1	3	3	2	2	Ret	**1**	2	**1**	Ret	374
2	(Hong Kong) Kimi Chan	**1**	1	**1**	2	5	Ret	1	Ret	**3**	5	5	1	**DSQ**	5	5	17	**2**	1	**1**	4	3	1	4	1	365
3	(China) Lucas Yu	Ret	8	2	3	7	4	Ret	6	5	3	**2**	5	3	6	4	1	1	6	4	2	2	3	3	2	305
4	(China) Chen Sicong	2	2	15	5	6	3	Ret	4	1	4	3	7	5	2	Ret	8	6	3	5	1	5	Ret	5	Ret	249
5	(China) Chen Zhuyuan	11	4	4	4	2	8	3	3	4	8	4	Ret	2	8	3	4	8	4	3	11	6	Ret	8	Ret	210
6	(China) David Zhao					4	1	12	1	6	1	7	2	6	4	**2**	2					9	Ret	DNS	4	189
7	(China) Josh Feng	6	DSQ	8	12	1	Ret	11	5	7	2	6	4	4	1	7	Ret	5	Ret	Ret	6	7	10	7	5	175
8	(China) Yuanyang Zeshi	4	5	5	Ret					10	6	9	3	10	7	8	7									75
9	(China) Alfred Lao													14	Ret	6	5	4	5	Ret	3	8	9	6	DNS	69
10	(China) Zhang Jun	9	13	9	9	8	12	4	8	9	7	10	9	Ret	13	10	10	10	8	6	Ret	10	6	9	8	67
11	(China) Liu Shangqing									18	10	15	12	8	9	11	6	7	7	Ret	5	11	Ret	11	3	52
12	(China) Sun Anzhe																					4	4	2	10	43
13	(China) Liu Taiji	5	7	7	7					8	9	8	Ret													38
14	(Hong Kong) Andy Law	7	Ret	10	6	9	11	5	10	15	Ret	Ret	WD	DSQ	14	Ret	15	15	Ret	Ret	8	15	Ret	18	13	33
15	(China) Shi Wei	3	6	6	11																					31
16	(China) Yang Peng	Ret	11	Ret	14	10	6	10	7	13	Ret	18	Ret	11	10	12	13					16	5	19	Ret	29
17	(China) Qi Diqin	13	Ret	11	8	11	7	6	9	12	16	11	8	DSQ	16	16	14	14	12	Ret	9	Ret	Ret	17	21	28
18	(Hong Kong) Ken Chow	14	Ret	Ret	18	13	9	7	13	19	17	17	15	13	DSQ	15	Ret	Ret	13	11	7	18	17	Ret	17	16
19	(Hong Kong) Jason Chow	Ret	DNS	Ret	15	15	13	8	11	11	14	Ret	11	7	DSQ	9	Ret	9	Ret	Ret	Ret	21	15	Ret	15	14
20	(Russia) Viktor Turkin																	11	9	7	Ret	14	8	22	11	12
21	(Hong Kong) Qian Fanghang																					Ret	DNS	10	6	9
22	(France) Héloïse Goldberg																					13	7	13	9	8
23	(China) Huang Xiaofeng	13	12	14	16	14	10	9	12	16	11	14	Ret	12	15	14	11	12	11	8	Ret	17	12	DNS	16	8
24	(China) Yang Kaiwen																					Ret	Ret	12	7	6
25	(China) Tu Yate	8	9	12	17																					6
26	(China) Jiang Wei	12	10	13	19					17	13	12	13					Ret	10	9	10	20	Ret	14	19	5
27	(Macau) Vernice Lao													9	12	13	9									4
28	(China) Wang Zejun									14	12	13	10									22	11	DNS	WD	1
29	(China) Tian Feng									Ret	15	16	14	15	17	17	16	13	14	10	Ret	23	13	20	18	1
30	(China) Huang Chujian	10	Ret	Ret	13																					1
31	(Hong Kong) Patrick Tsang	Ret	14	Ret	10																	25	16	DNS	WD	1
32	(United States) Ethan Liu													DSQ	11	Ret	12					12	19	15	14	0
33	(China) Yu Haoxi																					19	14	16	12	0
34	(Hong Kong) Hon Yingfu																					24	18	21	20	0
—	(China) Cheng Meng					DNS	WD	WD	WD																	0
Guest drivers ineligible to score points
—	(China) Li Huiwei					12	5	13	Ret																	–
Pos	Driver	SIC				V1T				NIC				CTC				HIC				ZIC				Pts

Colour	Result
Gold	Winner
Silver	Second place
Bronze	Third place
Green	Points classification
Blue	Non-points classification
Blue	Non-classified finish (NC)
Purple	Retired, not classified (Ret)
Red	Did not qualify (DNQ)
Red	Did not pre-qualify (DNPQ)
Black	Disqualified (DSQ)
White	Did not start (DNS)
White	Withdrew (WD)
White	Race cancelled (C)
Blank	Did not practice (DNP)
Blank	Did not arrive (DNA)
Blank	Excluded (EX)

**Bold** – Pole
Italics – Fastest Lap
† — Did not finish, but classified

=== Teams' Championship ===
Pos	Driver	SIC				V1T				NIC				CTC				HIC				ZIC				Pts
Pos	Driver	R1	R2	R3	R4	R5	R6	R7	R8	R9	R10	R11	R12	R13	R14	R15	R16	R17	R18	R19	R20	R21	R22	R23	R24	Pts
–	(China) Champ Motorsport																									–
–	(China) Black Blade Racing																									–
–	(China) Asia Racing Team RFN																									–
–	(China) Blackjack Racing RFN																									–
–	(China) Venom Motorsport																									–
–	(China) Black Blade GP																									–
–	(China) Kai Fei Motorsport																									–
–	(China) Frankenstein by Pointer Racing																									–
–	(China) SHE Power Racing																									–
–	(China) Yinqiao Geeke Racing																									–
–	(China) CHAMP Academy																									–
–	(China) GYT Racing																									–
Pos	Driver	SIC				V1T				NIC				CTC				HIC				ZIC				Pts
