= 2026 SMP F4 Championship =

Formula 4 motor racing season in Europe

The 2026 SMP F4 Championship was the second season of the relaunched SMP F4 Championship and seventh season overall after a five-year break. The season started at the Moscow Raceway on 16 May and finished at the same track on 10 October.

The second season of SMP Formula 4's winter series will take place at Fort Grozny Autodrom and Rustavi International Motorpark from 26 November 2026, 13 March 2027.

== Main series ==
=== Teams and drivers ===
Team	No.	Driver	Rounds
(Russia) ITECO Racing	11	(Russia) Maksim Orlov	1–3, 5–6
(Russia) ITECO Racing	14	(Russia) Tigran Bunatyan	4
(Russia) ITECO Racing	27	(Russia) Timur Shagaliev	1–3, 5–6
(Russia) ITECO Racing	28	(Russia) Gleb Solovov	6
(Russia) ITECO Racing	44	(Russia) Sofia Grinevich	4
(Russia) ITECO Racing	50	(Russia) Ivan Pigaev	All
(Russia) ITECO Racing	97	(Russia) Ivan Ovsienko	1–5
Formula K Russia	17	(Russia) Ilya Dunin	All
Formula K Russia	26	(Russia) Artemiy Troitskiy	6
Formula K Russia	33	(Russia) Andrey Sizov	1–5
Formula K Russia	74	(Russia) Vladimir Verkholantsev	All
Formula K Russia	78	(Russia) Tatiana Alekseeva	All
(Russia) Ilya Muromets	18	(Russia) Maksim Arkhangelskiy	All
(Russia) Ilya Muromets	79	(Russia) Platon Kostin	All
(Russia) Dronov Motorsport	19	(Russia) Egor Stepanov-Kim	All
(Russia) Dronov Motorsport	73	(Russia) Marko Markozov	All
(Russia) NI racing	21	(Russia) Mikhail Yushenkov	All
(Russia) NI racing	77	(Russia) Pavel Abrosimov	All
(Russia) Texol Racing	22	(Russia) Lev Guba	All
(Russia) Texol Racing	45	(Russia) Yaroslav Karpov	All
(Russia) Dronov Motorsport Junior	26	(Russia) Artemiy Troitskiy	5
(Russia) Dronov Motorsport Junior	34	(Russia) Ivan Bauer	All
(Russia) Dronov Motorsport Junior	38	(Russia) Amir Sabirov	1–4, 6

=== Race calendar and results ===
All rounds are held on Russian tracks as part of the Russian Circuit Racing Series weekends.

Round		Circuit	Date	Pole position	Fastest lap	Winning driver	Winning team
1	R1	(Russia) Moscow Raceway, Volokolamsk	16 May	(Russia) Ivan Pigaev	(Russia) Ivan Pigaev	(Russia) Ivan Pigaev	(Russia) ITECO Racing
1	R2	(Russia) Moscow Raceway, Volokolamsk	16 May		(Russia) Vladimir Verkholantsev	(Russia) Timur Shagaliev (Note: Maksim Orlov originally won the race but was given a 10-second time penalty for a false start.)	(Russia) ITECO Racing
1	R3	(Russia) Moscow Raceway, Volokolamsk	17 May	(Russia) Timur Shagaliev	(Russia) Maksim Orlov	(Russia) Maksim Orlov	(Russia) ITECO Racing
1	R4	(Russia) Moscow Raceway, Volokolamsk	17 May		(Russia) Platon Kostin	(Russia) Platon Kostin	(Russia) Ilya Muromets
2	R5	(Russia) Kazan Ring, Kazan	13 June	(Russia) Vladimir Verkholantsev	(Russia) Vladimir Verkholantsev	(Russia) Platon Kostin	(Russia) Ilya Muromets
2	R6	(Russia) Kazan Ring, Kazan	13 June		(Russia) Maksim Orlov	(Russia) Maksim Orlov	(Russia) ITECO Racing
2	R7	(Russia) Kazan Ring, Kazan	14 June	(Russia) Vladimir Verkholantsev	(Russia) Vladimir Verkholantsev	(Russia) Platon Kostin (Note: Vladimir Verkholantsev originally won the race but was given a 3-second time penalty for excessive weaving during defence.)	(Russia) Ilya Muromets
2	R8	(Russia) Kazan Ring, Kazan	14 June		(Russia) Platon Kostin	(Russia) Platon Kostin	(Russia) Ilya Muromets
3	R9	(Russia) Igora Drive, Priozersk	8 August	(Russia) Ivan Pigaev	(Russia) Ivan Pigaev	(Russia) Vladimir Verkholantsev	Formula K Russia
3	R10	(Russia) Igora Drive, Priozersk	8 August		(Russia) Ivan Pigaev	(Russia) Ivan Pigaev	(Russia) ITECO Racing
3	R11	(Russia) Igora Drive, Priozersk	9 August	(Russia) Ivan Pigaev	(Russia) Platon Kostin	(Russia) Ivan Pigaev	(Russia) ITECO Racing
3	R12	(Russia) Igora Drive, Priozersk	9 August		(Russia) Ivan Pigaev	(Russia) Egor Stepanov-Kim	(Russia) Dronov Motorsport
4	R13	(Russia) NRING Circuit, Bogorodsk	29 August	(Russia) Ivan Pigaev	(Russia) Ivan Pigaev	(Russia) Ivan Pigaev	(Russia) ITECO Racing
4	R14	(Russia) NRING Circuit, Bogorodsk	29 August		(Russia) Egor Stepanov-Kim	(Russia) Maksim Arkhangelskiy	(Russia) Ilya Muromets
4	R15	(Russia) NRING Circuit, Bogorodsk	30 August	(Russia) Ivan Pigaev	(Russia) Ivan Pigaev	(Russia) Ivan Pigaev	(Russia) ITECO Racing
4	R16	(Russia) NRING Circuit, Bogorodsk	30 August		(Russia) Platon Kostin	(Russia) Ivan Pigaev	(Russia) ITECO Racing
5	R17	(Russia) Fort Grozny Autodrom, Grozny	11 September	(Russia) Ivan Pigaev	(Russia) Platon Kostin	(Russia) Ivan Pigaev	(Russia) ITECO Racing
5	R18	(Russia) Fort Grozny Autodrom, Grozny	11 September		(Russia) Ivan Pigaev	(Russia) Andrey Sizov	Formula K Russia
5	R19	(Russia) Fort Grozny Autodrom, Grozny	12 September	(Russia) Ivan Pigaev	(Russia) Ivan Pigaev	(Russia) Ivan Pigaev	(Russia) ITECO Racing
5	R20	(Russia) Fort Grozny Autodrom, Grozny	12 September		(Russia) Ivan Bauer	(Russia) Maksim Arkhangelskiy	(Russia) Ilya Muromets
6	R21	(Russia) Moscow Raceway, Volokolamsk	9 October	(Russia) Ivan Pigaev	(Russia) Maksim Orlov	(Russia) Egor Stepanov-Kim	(Russia) Dronov Motorsport
6	R22	(Russia) Moscow Raceway, Volokolamsk	9 October		(Russia) Maksim Orlov	(Russia) Maksim Orlov	(Russia) ITECO Racing
6	R23	(Russia) Moscow Raceway, Volokolamsk	10 October	(Russia) Maksim Orlov	(Russia) Egor Stepanov-Kim	(Russia) Maksim Orlov	(Russia) ITECO Racing
6	R24	(Russia) Moscow Raceway, Volokolamsk	10 October		(Russia) Maksim Orlov	(Russia) Egor Stepanov-Kim	(Russia) Dronov Motorsport

=== Championship standings ===
Qualifying points

Points were awarded to the top six fastest drivers in qualifying.

Position	**1st**	**2nd**	**3rd**	**4th**	**5th**	**6th**
Points	6	5	4	3	2	1

Race points

Points were awarded to the top fifteen classified finishers. Driver has to complete at least 75% of the race distance to be classified. The final classifications is obtained by summing up the scores on the 5 best results obtained during each of points sessions (Q1, Q2, R1, R2, R3 and R4 (10 qualifying and 20 races total). Sessions where driver was disqualified are not eligible for exclusion.

Races	Position, points per race														
Races	1st	2nd	3rd	4th	5th	6th	7th	8th	9th	10th	11th	12th	13th	14th	15th
Races 1 & 3	25	20	16	13	11	10	9	8	7	6	5	4	3	2	1
Races 2 & 4	20	17	15	13	11	10	9	8	7	6	5	4	3	2	1

==== Drivers' Championship ====
Pos	Driver	MRA1				KZR				IGO				NRG				FGA				MRA2				Pts (Note: The final classifications is obtained by summing up the scores on the 5 best results obtained during each of points sessions (Q1, Q2, R1, R2, R3 and R4 (10 qualifying and 20 races total). Numbers without parentheses are championship points; numbers in parentheses are total points scored.)
Pos	Driver	R1	R2	R3	R4	R5	R6	R7	R8	R9	R10	R11	R12	R13	R14	R15	R16	R17	R18	R19	R20	R21	R22	R23	R24	Pts
1	(Russia) Ivan Pigaev	**1**^{1}	4	4^{3}	4	18^{(6)}	Ret	(6)	2	**5**^{1}	1	**1**^{1}	2	**1**^{1}	6	**1**^{1}	1	**1**^{1}	4	**1**^{1}	(14)	**8**^{1}	Ret	4^{5}	3	387
2	(Russia) Platon Kostin	3^{4}	2	6^{(4)}	1	1^{2}	4	1^{2}	1	2^{3}	4	2^{4}	7	(9)^{2}	(7)	2^{4}	2	6	2	17^{4}	4	9^{4}	6	2^{3}	(9)	360
3	(Russia) Vladimir Verkholantsev	2^{2}	3	2	2	**4**^{1}	5	**2**^{1}	3	1^{2}	5	4^{2}	5	2^{3}	(13)	3^{2}	(7)	3^{3}	6	(15)	2	(7)^{(6)}	2	10	4	346
4	(Russia) Maksim Orlov	7	5	1^{2}	3	9	1	10^{5}	Ret	4	2	3^{3}	16					4^{4}	8	2^{3}	3	3^{5}	1	**1**^{1}	2	299
5	(Russia) Egor Stepanov-Kim	(6)	9	5	5	5^{4}	8	9^{4}	14	3^{4}	8	5^{6}	1	3^{4}	16	13^{3}	Ret	2^{2}	5	Ret^{2}	12	1^{3}	3	5^{6}	1	269
6	(Russia) Maksim Arkhangelskiy	4^{5}	8	9^{5}	6	3^{3}	Ret	4	(9)	7^{5}	9	6^{5}	4	7	1	Ret	5	5^{5}	3	3	1	(11)^{2}	8	3^{4}	6	264
7	(Russia) Timur Shagaliev	9	1	**3**^{1}	8	2^{5}	3	14	4	8	3	8	10					Ret^{6}	7	7^{5}	6	4	4	6^{2}	15	219
8	(Russia) Marko Markozov	5^{6}	7	8	11	16	9	8	(15)	11	6	9	11	4^{5}	3	6	3	DNS	DNS	(14)^{6}	9	2	10	8	5	184
9	(Russia) Mikhail Yushenkov	13	Ret	7	9	6	2	5^{6}	16†	6^{6}	11	10	3	Ret	14	(14)	4	9	10	8	5	13	12	9	7	165
10	(Russia) Andrey Sizov	8^{3}	6	13	10	11	11	3^{3}	5	9	7	11	13	5	5	Ret^{5}	15	7	1	5	17					161
11	(Russia) Ivan Bauer	11	Ret	(14)	Ret	17	13	11	11	15	17	7	6	6	8	7	16	8	Ret	4	Ret	5	5	7	10	123
12	(Russia) Ivan Ovsienko	10	10	10^{6}	7	10	7	7	7	10	10	13	8	10	11	4	14	Ret	15†	6	16					121
13	(Russia) Ilya Dunin	16	(15)	17	16	15	10	16	10	16	12	17	12	8	2	5	8	10	9	9	7	10	11	14	13	110
14	(Russia) Amir Sabirov	12	11	11	14	7	6	13	8	13	14	14	15	13	15	8	9					6	7	12	8	104
15	(Russia) Tatiana Alekseeva	15	12	12	(15)	8	Ret	12	6	12	15	(15)	9	Ret^{6}	9	11	11	11	Ret	11	10	14	14	DSQ	12	85
16	(Russia) Pavel Abrosimov	14	16	16	13	14	14†	Ret	12	Ret	13	12	18	11	18	12	12	15	12	10	8	12	9	15	16	64
17	(Russia) Lev Guba	17	14	15	Ret	12	12	15	Ret	14	18	16	14	12	10	9	10	12	13	16	15	15	Ret	Ret	DNS	48
18	(Russia) Yaroslav Karpov	18	13	18	12	13	15†	17	13	17	16	18	17	Ret	12	10	13	13	14	12	13	17	Ret	Ret	Ret	39
19	(Russia) Tigran Bunatyan													15	4	Ret^{6}	6									25
20	(Russia) Artemiy Troitskiy																	14	11	13	11	16	DNS	11	11	25
21	(Russia) Gleb Solovov																					18	13	13	14	8
22	(Russia) Sofia Grinevich													14	17	15	17									3
Pos	Driver	MRA1				KZR				IGO				NRG				FGA				MRA2				Pts

Colour	Result
Gold	Winner
Silver	Second place
Bronze	Third place
Green	Points classification
Blue	Non-points classification
Blue	Non-classified finish (NC)
Purple	Retired, not classified (Ret)
Red	Did not qualify (DNQ)
Red	Did not pre-qualify (DNPQ)
Black	Disqualified (DSQ)
White	Did not start (DNS)
White	Withdrew (WD)
White	Race cancelled (C)
Blank	Did not practice (DNP)
Blank	Did not arrive (DNA)
Blank	Excluded (EX)

**Bold** – Pole
Italics – Fastest Lap
† — Did not finish, but classified

== Winter series ==
=== Teams and drivers ===
Team	No.	Driver	Rounds
(Russia) ITECO Racing	TBA	(Russia) Maksim Arkhangelskiy	TBA
(Russia) ITECO Racing	TBA	(Russia) Sofia Grinevich	TBA
(Russia) ITECO Racing	TBA	(Russia) Diniyar Islamov	TBA
(Russia) ITECO Racing	TBA	(Russia) Aleksandr Kulikov	TBA
(Russia) Ilya Muromets	19	(Russia) Egor Taldykin	TBA
(Russia) Ilya Muromets	27	(Russia) Gerasim Skulanov	TBA
(Russia) Ilya Muromets	TBA	(Russia) TBA	TBA

=== Race calendar and results ===
All rounds will be held as part of the Winter Circuit Series weekends in two double rounds starting at Fort Grozny Autodrom and finishing in Georgia at Rustavi International Motorpark.

Round		Circuit	Date	Pole position	Fastest lap	Winning driver	Winning team
1	R1	(Russia) Fort Grozny Autodrom, Grozny	28 November				
1	R2	(Russia) Fort Grozny Autodrom, Grozny	28 November				
1	R3	(Russia) Fort Grozny Autodrom, Grozny	29 November				
1	R4	(Russia) Fort Grozny Autodrom, Grozny	29 November				
2	R5	(Russia) Fort Grozny Autodrom, Grozny	4 December				
2	R6	(Russia) Fort Grozny Autodrom, Grozny	4 December				
2	R7	(Russia) Fort Grozny Autodrom, Grozny	5 December				
2	R8	(Russia) Fort Grozny Autodrom, Grozny	5 December				
3	R9	(Georgia (country)) Rustavi International Motorpark, Rustavi	6 March				
3	R10	(Georgia (country)) Rustavi International Motorpark, Rustavi	6 March				
3	R11	(Georgia (country)) Rustavi International Motorpark, Rustavi	7 March				
3	R12	(Georgia (country)) Rustavi International Motorpark, Rustavi	7 March				
4	R13	(Georgia (country)) Rustavi International Motorpark, Rustavi	12 March				
4	R14	(Georgia (country)) Rustavi International Motorpark, Rustavi	12 March				
4	R15	(Georgia (country)) Rustavi International Motorpark, Rustavi	13 March				
4	R16	(Georgia (country)) Rustavi International Motorpark, Rustavi	13 March				

=== Championship standings ===
Qualifying points

Points are awarded to the top five fastest drivers in qualifying.

Position	1st	2nd	3rd	4th	5th
Points	10	5	3	2	1

Race points

Points are awarded to the top fifteen classified finishers. Driver has to complete at least 75% of the race distance to be classified. The final classifications is obtained by summing up all scores except one worst race result obtained during each round.

Races	Position, points per race														
Races	1st	2nd	3rd	4th	5th	6th	7th	8th	9th	10th	11th	12th	13th	14th	15th
Races 1 & 3	25	20	16	13	11	10	9	8	7	6	5	4	3	2	1
Races 2 & 4	20	17	15	13	11	10	9	8	7	6	5	4	3	2	1
