= SMP F4 Championship =

Former Single-Seater Racing Championship

- Category: FIA Formula 4
- Country: Russia and Finland
- Region: Northern Europe
- Inaugural season: 2015
- Constructors: Tatuus
- Engine suppliers: Abarth
- Tyre suppliers: Hankook
- Drivers' champion: (Russia) Ivan Pigaev
- Official website: Official website

The SMP F4 Championship (also known as the F4 NEZ Championship by SMP Racing) is a racing series regulated according to FIA Formula 4 regulations. It was based in the FIA's North European Zone and the Netherlands, and was only open to drivers from these countries. The inaugural season was the 2015 SMP F4 Championship.

After the 2019 season SMP Formula 4 Championship lost FIA certification. The series was relocated to Russia as a support series for the Russian Circuit Racing Series. The drivers competes for Cup of Russian Automobile Federation.

There was a plan to revive the championship in 2023 with three stages. It wasn't implemented.

The championship was revived in November 2024 as a single event at the Sirius Autodrom in Sochi. There were 13 participants, 10 of them competed in the race.

== History ==
Gerhard Berger and the FIA Singleseater Commission launched the FIA Formula 4 in March 2013. The goal of the Formula 4 is to make the ladder to Formula One more transparent. Besides sporting and technical regulations, costs are regulated too. A car to compete in this category may not exceed €30,000 in purchase. A single season in Formula 4 may not exceed €100,000 in costs. The SMP F4 was one of the second phase Formula 4 championships to be launched. The first phase championships was the Italian F4 Championship and the Formula 4 Sudamericana which started in 2014. The SMP championship was launched by SMP Racing, the Russian Automobile Federation, Koiranen GP and AKK-Motorsport on 22 July 2014. Italian race car constructor Tatuus was contracted to design and build all the cars.

The championship expanded out of the FIA North European Zone for its second season. Following the failure to establish a separate Formula 4 championship in the Benelux region, it incorporated two rounds in the Netherlands, and awarded a Dutch Formula 4 Trophy for these two rounds plus a standalone Formula 4 Festival. MP Motorsport also operated cars alongside Koiranen GP, which ran all drivers in the inaugural season. The championship split, with Koiranen GP leaving from 2019. Koiranen GP creating Formula Academy Finland in 2018, continues as the promoter Formula Academy Finland. SMP F4 Championship continue operate SMP Racing, the Russian Automobile Federation.

== Car ==
The championship featured Tatuus-designed and built cars. The cars were constructed out of carbon fibre and featured a monocoque chassis. The engine was a 1.4 turbo Abarth. This is the same engine as in the Italian F4 Championship.

== Champions ==
Season	Driver	Team	Poles	Wins	Podiums	Fastest laps	Points	Clinched	Margin
2015	(Finland) Niko Kari	N/A (Note: The championship had not official dividing for the teams.)	4	7	19	9	449	Race 18 of 21	153
2016	(Netherlands) Richard Verschoor	N/A (Note: The championship had not official dividing for the teams but it is understood that his car had got a technical support from MP Motorsport.)	10	11	16	9	339	Race 17 of 20	69
2017	(Denmark) Christian Lundgaard	(Netherlands) MP Motorsport	7	10	14	10	292	Race 18 of 21	74
2018	(Finland) Konsta Lappalainen	(Finland) Kart in Club Driving Academy	4	7	15	4	316	Race 21 of 21	41
2019	(Russia) Pavel Bulantsev	(Russia) SMP Racing (Note: 2019 SMP F4 Championship all cars are run by Russian team SMP Racing and technical support from SMP Racing)	9	5	11	5	254	Race 13 of 13	30
2024 (cup)	(Russia) Yaroslav Shevyrtalov	(Russia) Dronov Motorsport	1	1	1	1	– (Note: 2024 G-Drive SMP F4 Cup included only 1 race, which was held at the Sirius Autodrom.)	Race 1 of 1	–
2025	(Russia) Yaroslav Shevyrtalov	(Russia) LADA Sport	5	2	8	5	323	Race 17 of 18	20
2025-26 (winter)	(Russia) Vladimir Verkholantsev	Formula K Russia	2	2	9	4	182	Race 9 of 10	7
2026	(Russia) Ivan Pigaev	(Russia) ITECO Racing	8	8	11	8	387	Race 23 of 24	27

== Circuits ==
- **Bold** denotes a circuit will be used in the 2027 season.

Number	Circuits	Rounds	Years
1	(Russia) **Moscow Raceway**	12 (Note: Moscow Raceway hosted 2 rounds in 2015–2017 and in 2025-2026.)	2015–2019, 2025–present
2	(Russia) Sirius Autodrom	7* (Note: Sirius Autodrom hosted 3 rounds in 2025-2026 winter series.)	2015–2017, 2024 (cup), 2025-2026 (winter)
3	(Finland) Ahvenisto Race Circuit	4	2015–2018
3	(Russia) **NRING Circuit**	4	2018–2019, 2025–present
5	(Finland) Alastaro Circuit	3	2015, 2018–2019
5	(Estonia) Auto24ring	3 (Note: Auto24ring hosted 2 rounds in 2015.)	2015, 2017
5	(Russia) Smolensk Ring	3	2017–2019
5	(Russia) **Kazan Ring**	3	2019, 2025–present
5	(Russia) Fort Grozny Autodrom	3	2019, 2025–present
10	(Netherlands) Circuit Zandvoort	2 (Note: Circuit Zandvoort hosted 2 rounds in 2016.)	2016
10	(Netherlands) Assen Circuit	2	2017–2018
10	(Russia) Autodrom Moscow	2	2018–2019
10	(Russia) **Igora Drive**	2	2025–present
14	(Sweden) Anderstorp Raceway	1	2016

* 3 in the main season + 4 additional (cup and winter series)
