= Igora Drive =

Motor racing venue, close to St. Petersburg, Russia

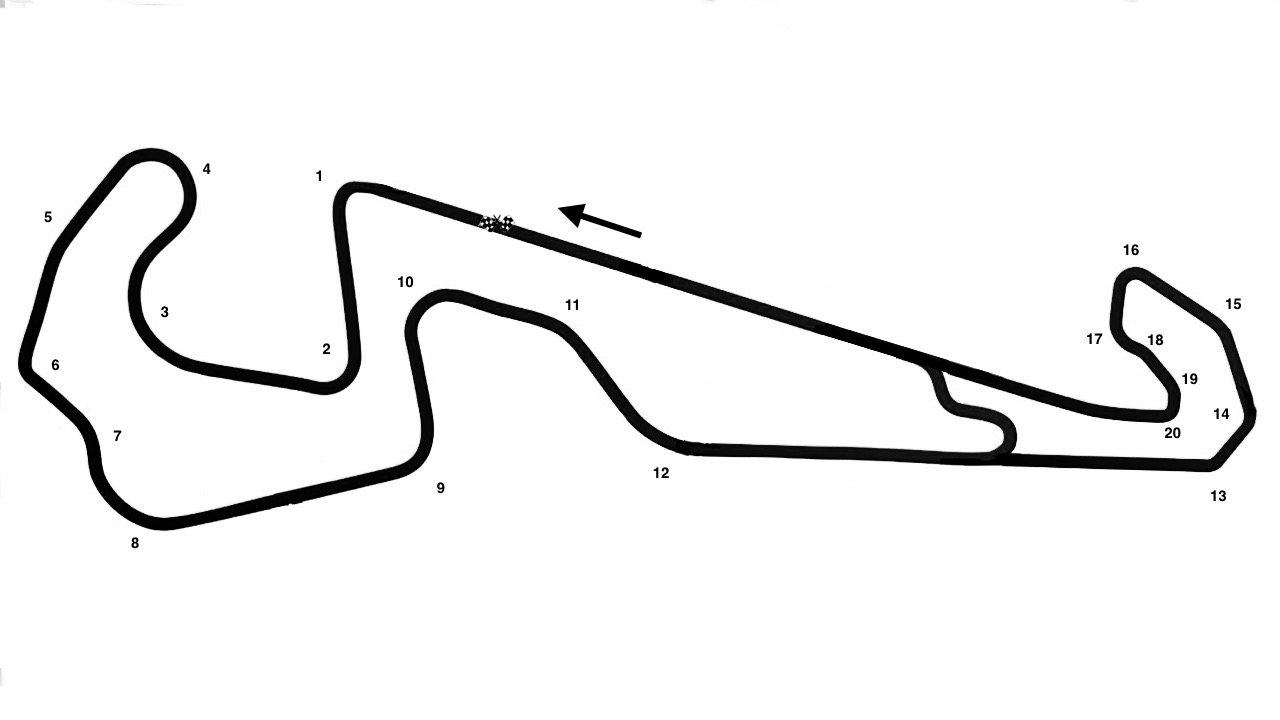
- Grand Prix Circuit (2022–present)

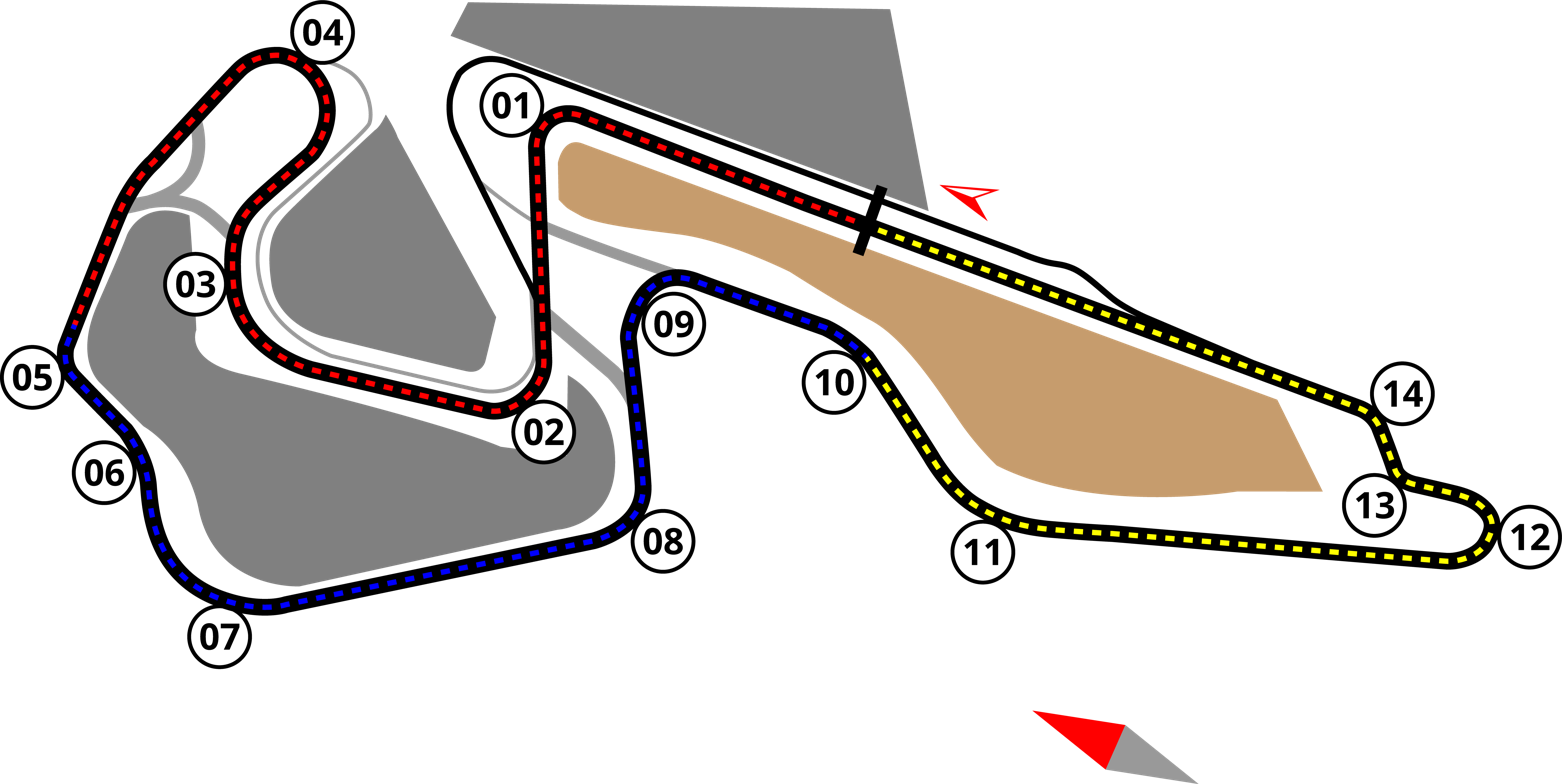
- Original Circuit (2019–present)
- Location: Novozhilovo, Leningrad Oblast, Russia
- Coordinates: 60°30′48″N 30°11′51″E
- Capacity: 50,000
- FIA Grade: 1 (both layouts)
- Broke ground: 2016
- Opened: 3 October 2019; 7 years ago
- Architect: Hermann Tilke
- Major events: Current: Russian Circuit Racing Series (2020–present); SMP F4 Championship (2025–present)
- Website: http://drive-igora.ru/

Grand Prix Circuit (2022–present)
- Length: 5.183 km (3.221 mi)
- Turns: 20
- Race lap record: 1:47.916 ( (Russia) Konstantin Tereshchenko, Ligier JS P325, 2026, LMP3)

Original Circuit (2019–present)
- Length: 4.086 km (2.539 mi)
- Turns: 15
- Race lap record: 1:39.327 ( (Russia) Renat Ibragimov, Porsche 911 (991 I) GT3 Cup, 2020, Carrera Cup)

Igora Drive (Russian: Игора Драйв, romanized: Igora Drayv) is a 5.183 km (3.221 mi) motorsport complex located at the resort of Igora in Novozhilovo, Leningrad Oblast, Russia, approximately 54 km (34 mi) north of Saint Petersburg.

On 26 June 2021, a contract was announced with the intention of moving the Russian Grand Prix from Sochi Autodrom to Igora starting on 2023 onwards. Due to Russia's invasion of Ukraine in 2022, the contract for the Grand Prix was terminated on 3 March.

== Characteristics ==
The complex includes ten professional tracks for oval track racing, drifting, rally-cross and motocross, and karting, as well a center for emergency management. The largest grandstand of the main circuit racing will accommodate five thousand people, and the total capacity of the circuit is fifty thousand people. The circuit itself was 4.086 km (2.539 mi) long and 12–15 metres (39–49 ft) wide. In 2022, the circuit length was increased to 5.183 km (3.221 mi) by featuring 20.5 metres (67 ft) of elevation changes instead of 17 metres (56 ft).

== Competition ==
In 2019, the complex signed an agreement with the Deutsche Tourenwagen Masters series. The contract runs for three years, with the option of a two-year extension. The first race was to be held from 29 to 31 May 2020 with W Series in support, but both races were cancelled as a result of the COVID-19 pandemic in Russia. An agreement was also signed with organisers of the FIA World Rallycross Championship to host the World RX of Russia in 2020. However, it was later removed from the schedule due to contractual issues. Igora Drive hosted the second round of the 2020 Russian Circuit Racing Series on 25 and 26 July.

From 2023, the Formula One Russian Grand Prix was initially set to be held at this track. For the Formula One race, the circuit was extended from 4.086 km (2.539 mi) to 5.183 km (3.221 mi) at the end of lap, resulting in 20 turns overall from the current 15, with both of the straights extended and a significant uphill section. However, in the wake of the 2022 Russian invasion of Ukraine, the Russian Grand Prix contract was terminated and all future races cancelled.

== Events ==
Current

- July: Russian Endurance Challenge
- August: Russian Circuit Racing Series, SMP F4 Championship, SMP RSKG Endurance

== Lap records ==
As of August 2026, the fastest official race lap records at the Igora Drive are listed as:

Category	Time	Driver	Vehicle	Event
Grand Prix Circuit (2022–present): 5.183 km (3.221 mi)
LMP3	1:47.916	Konstantin Tereshchenko	Ligier JS P325	2026 1000 km of Igora Drive
Group CN	1:48.379	Alexander Smolyar	BR Engineering BR03	2026 Igora Drive RSKG Endurance round
GT3	1:50.821	Michael Belov	Lamborghini Huracán GT3 Evo 2	2026 Igora Drive SMP RSKG Endurance round
Formula 4	1:54.129	Ivan Pigaev	Tatuus F4-T421	2026 Igora Drive SMP F4 round
Porsche Carrera Cup	1:56.273	Konstantin Tereshchenko	Porsche 911 (992 I) GT3 Cup	2025 Igora Drive Porsche Sport Challenge Russia round
TCR Touring Car	2:00.492	Artem Severiukhin	Lada Vesta NG Sport TCR	2026 Igora Drive RCRS round
GT4	2:00.520	Mikhail Aleshin	Mercedes-AMG GT4	2026 Igora Drive SMP RSKG Endurance round
Original Circuit (2019–present): 4.086 km (2.539 mi)
Porsche Carrera Cup	1:39.327	Renat Ibragimov	Porsche 911 (991 I) GT3 Cup	2020 Igora Drive Porsche Sport Challenge Russia round
GT4	1:40.105	Anton Nemkin	Mercedes-AMG GT4	2021 Igora Drive RCRS round
TCR Touring Car	1:40.235	Kirill Ladygin	LADA Vesta Sport TCR	2020 Igora Drive RCRS round
Group CN	1:44.157	Aleksandr Abkhazava	Artline Legends EVO	2022 Igora Drive RCRS round
