= 2020 Russian Circuit Racing Series =

Motor racing season

The 2020 SMP Russian Circuit Racing Series was the seventh season of the Russian Circuit Racing Series, organized by SMP Racing. It was the sixth season with TCR class cars. In 2020, the GT4 and CN classes were added to the main Touring, Touring Light, Super Production and S1600 classes.

Kiril Ladygin won the Russian Touring Car Championship, driving a Lada Vesta Sport TCR. Lada Sport Rosneft clinched the teams' title. Vladislav Nezvankin won the Super Production class, driving a Lada Vesta. Vladimir Sheshenin won the Touring Light class, driving a Lada Granta. Petr Plotnikov won the S1600 class, while Egor Fokin won the S1600 Junior; they were both driving a Volkswagen Polo Sedan. Denis Remenyako with Capital Racing Team won the GT4 class, driving a Mercedes-AMG GT4.

== Teams and drivers ==
Yokohama was the official tyre supplier.

=== Touring / TCR Russian Touring Car Championship ===
All teams were Russian-registered.

Team	Car	No.	Drivers	Class	Rounds
TAIF Motorsport	Hyundai i30 N TCR	1	(Russia) Dmitry Bragin		All
TAIF Motorsport	Volkswagen Golf GTI TCR	87	(Russia) Marat Sharapov	T	7
TAIF Motorsport	Audi RS3 LMS TCR	89	(Russia) Timur Shigabutdinov	T	6–7
Lukoil Racing Team	Audi RS3 LMS TCR	7	(Russia) Aleksey Dudukalo		All
Lukoil Racing Team	Hyundai i30 N TCR	16	(Russia) Ivan Lukashevich		All
Lukoil Racing Team	Hyundai i30 N TCR	43	(Russia) Andrey Maslennikov		All
RUMOS Racing	CUPRA León TCR	8	(Belarus) Vladimir Gorlach	T	1–6
RUMOS Racing	Audi RS3 LMS TCR	8	(Belarus) Vladimir Gorlach	T	7
RUMOS Racing	SEAT León TCR; CUPRA León TCR	47	(Russia) Lev Tolkachev	T	All
LADA Sport Rosneft	LADA Vesta Sport TCR	11	(Russia) Kirill Ladygin		All
LADA Sport Rosneft	LADA Vesta Sport TCR	30	(Russia) Mikhail Mityaev		All
VRC-Team	Hyundai i30 N TCR	14	(Russia) Klim Gavrilov		All
Carville Racing	Hyundai i30 N TCR	91	(Russia) Grigoriy Burlutskiy		All
Carville Racing	Volkswagen Golf GTI TCR	27	(Russia) Andrey Radoshnov	T	1
Carville Racing	Audi RS3 LMS TCR	27	(Russia) Andrey Radoshnov	T	2–7
Carville Racing	SEAT León TCR	46	(Russia) Lev Nikitin	T	2
AG Team	CUPRA León TCR	17	(Russia) Pavel Kalmanovich		All
AG Team	Audi RS3 LMS TCR	18	(Russia) Rustam Fatkhutdinov	T	All
Neva Motorsport	CUPRA León TCR	37	(Russia) Pavel Yashin	T	2, 4–5
Neva Motorsport	CUPRA León TCR DSG	38	(Russia) Andrey Yushin	T	4
Racing Team	Audi RS3 LMS TCR	41	(Russia) Ilya Yekushevsky	T	1–6
Akhmat Racing Team	Volkswagen Golf GTI TCR	63	(Russia) Ibraghim Akhmadov	T	1–2, 4
Motor Sharks	Honda Civic Type R TCR (FK8)	83	(Russia) Anton Nemkin	T	1–5

Key
Teams claimed for team points.
T	SMP RCRS Trophy.

=== Super Production ===
All teams and drivers are Russian-registered.

Team	Car	No.	Drivers	Rounds
LADA Sport Rosneft	LADA Vesta	10	Andrey Petukhov	All
LADA Sport Rosneft	LADA Vesta	50	Vladislav Nezvankin	All
LECAR Racing Team	LADA Vesta	45	Eugeny Meites	All
Boyarinova Racing Team	Mazda 3	18	Ekaterina Boyarinova	7
Sofit Racing Team	Subaru BRZ	19	Ilsur Akhmetvaleev	1
Sofit Racing Team	Subaru BRZ	22	Dmitry Lebedev	2–7
Sofit Racing Team	Subaru BRZ	39	Nikolay Serebryakov	7
Sofit Racing Team	Subaru BRZ	59	Aleksandr Batov	6
Sofit Racing Team	Subaru BRZ	78	Vadim Antipov	All
Sofit Racing Team	Subaru BRZ	87	Pavel Pastushkov	2, 4, 6
Sofit Racing Team	Subaru BRZ	97	Alexander Malinin	1
GTE Racing Team	Mazda 3	28	Ilya Obzhigalov	1–2, 4
MEPhI RHHCC Racing Team	Mazda 3	28	Ilya Obzhigalov	3
MEPhI RHHCC Racing Team	Volkswagen Scirocco	54	Aleksandr Garmash	All
MEPhI RHHCC Racing Team	Honda Civic Type-R	88	Nikolay Vikhanskiy	1–2, 4–7

Key
Teams claimed for team points.

=== Touring-Light ===
All teams and drivers are Russian-registered.

Team	Car	No.	Drivers	Rounds
TBRacing	Peugeot 208 R2	3	Roman Golikov	1, 4–7
TBRacing	Peugeot 208 R2	19	Rodion Shushakov	All
TBRacing	Peugeot 208 R2	91	Ilsur Akhmetvaleev	2–4
Suvar Motorsprot	Renault Twingo	91	Ilsur Akhmetvaleev	5–6
Suvar Motorsprot	Lada Granta NFR	4	Ildar Rakhmatullin	1–3
Rally Academy	Volkswagen Polo	5	Irina Sidorkova	1–3, 5–7
Rally Academy	Volkswagen Polo	12	Nikolay Karamyshev	All
Rally Academy	Volkswagen Polo	17	Vladimir Cherevan	All
PSM Team	Hyundai Solaris	7	Aleksandr Salnikov	1–6
Ravon Racing Team	Ravon Nexia R3	8	Mikhail Grachev	6–7
Ravon Racing Team	Ravon Nexia R3	48	Aydar Nuriev	6–7
LADA Sport Rosneft	LADA Granta NFR	11	Vladimir Sheshenin	All
LADA Sport Rosneft	LADA Granta NFR	53	Leonid Panfilov	All
B-Tuning Pro Racing	Volkswagen Polo	16	Tatiana Eliseeva	5–6
B-Tuning Pro Racing	Volkswagen Polo	83	Andrey Sevastianov	All
Bragin Racing Team	Kia Rio X-Line	63	Mikhail Simonov	2–3, 5–6
VRC-Team	Peugeot 208	69	Artemiy Lyakin	1–2
AG Team	Hyundai Solaris	70	Ilya Rodkin	6
Fas Motorsport	Volkswagen Polo	89	Artem Fridman	All

Key
Teams claimed for team points.

=== S1600 ===
All teams and drivers are Russian-registered, with the exception of the Belarusian racer Alexei Savin..

Team	Car	No.	Drivers	Rounds
LADA Sport Rosneft	Lada Granta NFR	1	Vladimir Melnikov	2
LADA Sport Rosneft	Lada Granta NFR	7	Mikhail Kuldiayev	3
LADA Sport Rosneft	Lada Granta NFR	10	Maksim Kadakov	5
LADA Sport Rosneft	Lada Granta NFR	23	Kirill Larin	4
LADA Sport Rosneft	Lada Granta NFR	25	Dmitry Laskov	7
LADA Sport Rosneft	Lada Granta NFR	71	Dmitry Semenov	6
LADA Sport Rosneft	Lada Granta NFR	99	Vadim Gagarin	1
RUMOS Racing	Hyundai Solaris	10	Stanislav Novikov	1–4
RUMOS Racing	Kia Rio X-Line	10	Stanislav Novikov	5–7
RUMOS Racing	Kia Rio X-Line	46	Efim Gantmakher	All
Roman Shusharin	Kia Rio	15	Roman Shusharin	All
Funky Racing Team	Hyundai Solaris	21	Airat Zargirov	3
Funky Racing Team	Hyundai Solaris	80	Igor Lvov	1–2
Funky Racing Team	Kia Rio	81	Boris Pevzner	1–3
Maslennikov Aleksandr	Volkswagen Polo	22	Aleksandr Maslennikov	2
Mikhail Dralin	Lada Granta NFR	30	Mikhail Dralin	All
DM-Racing	Lada Kalina	32	Artem Volkov	6
Dmitry Dudarev	Kia Rio X-Line	33	Dmitry Dudarev	All
Sergei Schegolev	Hyundai Solaris	40	Sergei Schegolev	1–6
Akhmat Racing Team	Kia Rio X-Line	44	Ruslan Nafikov	All
Akhmat Racing Team	Kia Rio	56	Vasiliy Korablev	All
Rally Academy	Volkswagen Polo Sedan	47	Ilya Gorbatskiy	1–2, 6
Rally Academy	Volkswagen Polo Sedan	55	Petr Plotnikov	All
Ivan Tverdokhlebov	Kia Rio	49	Ivan Tverdokhlebov	All
Microbor AG Team	Hyundai Solaris	50	Boris Shulmeister	All
B-Tuning Pro Racing	Volkswagen Polo Sedan	54	Aleksandr Buylov	2–6
Bragin Racing Team	Kia Rio X-Line	62	Mikhail Simonov	7
Savin Vataly	Kia Rio	66	Aleksey Savin	All
Ivan Tolcheev	Lada Kalina NFR Kit	73	Ivan Tolcheev	1
Ershikov Anatoly	Lada Kalina	77	Anatoly Ershikov	3–4, 6
GTE Racing Team	LADA Granta NFR	74	David Pogosyan	6–7
GTE Racing Team	LADA Granta NFR	84	Philipp Tuponosov	All
GTE Racing Team	LADA Granta NFR	96	Vasiliy Vladykin	All
Aleksey Fadeev	Lada Kalina NFR Kit	88	Aleksey Fadeev	2

Key
Teams claimed for team points.

=== S1600 Junior ===
All teams and drivers are Russian-registered.

Team	Car	No.	Drivers	Rounds
Rumos Racing	Volkswagen Polo Sedan	3	Yaroslava Kopytina	2–7
B-Tuning Pro Racing; Anton Zakharov's Racing Academy	Volkswagen Polo Sedan	7	Dmity Galitsyn	2–4
B-Tuning Pro Racing; Anton Zakharov's Racing Academy	Volkswagen Polo Sedan	19	Egor Ganin	2–7
B-Tuning Pro Racing; Anton Zakharov's Racing Academy	Volkswagen Polo Sedan	33	Kirill Zakharov	5–7
AG Team	Ford Fiesta	11	Nikita Dubinin	2–7
AG Team	Volkswagen Polo Sedan	33	Ivan Kazarin	2
AG Team	Volkswagen Polo Sedan	87	Artem Antonov	5–7
AG Team	Volkswagen Polo Sedan	13	Stepan Anufriev	6
UMMC Motorsport	Volkswagen Polo Sedan	13	Stepan Anufriev	2–5, 7
UMMC Motorsport	Volkswagen Polo Sedan	12	Amirkhan Faizrakhmanov	2–4
Rally Academy	Volkswagen Polo Sedan	51	Artemy Pershin	2–7
Rally Academy	Volkswagen Polo Sedan	78	Egor Fokin	2–7
Akhmat Racing Team	Volkswagen Polo Sedan	63	Jabrail Akhmadov	2, 4–7
Goltsova Racing	Volkswagen Polo Sedan	77	Virsavia Goltsova	2–3

Key
Teams claimed for team points.

=== GT4 ===
All teams and drivers are Russian-registered.

Team	Car	No.	Drivers	Rounds
Konstantin Zakharevsky	Porsche Cayman GT4 Clubsport MR	7	Konstantin Zakharevsky	2, 4
Eugeny Kulikov	Porsche Cayman GT4 Clubsport MR	8	Eugeny Kulikov	2, 4
Andrey Goncharov	KTM X-Bow GT4 Evo	11	Andrey Goncharov	4, 6–7
Capital Racing Team	Mercedes-AMG GT4	13	Denis Remenyako	1–4, 7
Aleksandr Maslennikov	KTM X-Bow GT4 Evo	22	Aleksandr Maslennikov	2
VRC-Team	Porsche 718 Cayman GT4 Clubsport	28	Aleksey Bashmakov	2, 4
Andrey Fedotov	Porsche 718 Cayman GT4 Clubsport	37	Andrey Fedotov	1–4, 6
UMMC Motorsport	Mercedes-AMG GT4	44	Sergey Stolyarov	3–4
Motor Sharks	Mercedes-AMG GT4	83	Anton Nemkin	7
Wicked Speed Racing	Mercedes-AMG GT4	88	Aleksandr Vaintrub	1–2

Key
Teams claimed for team points.

=== Sports prototype CN ===
All teams and drivers are Russian-registered.

Team	Car	No.	Drivers	Rounds
Sergey Tikhomirov	Shortcut	5	Sergey Tikhomirov	2, 4
Tatiana Dobrynina	Shortcut	7	Tatiana Dobrynina	1–2, 4–7
Artem Naslednikov	Shortcut	8	Artem Naslednikov	4
Ivan Pugachev	Shortcut	9	Ivan Pugachev	1–3, 6
CSKA	Shortcut	10	Sergey Ievlev	1–2, 4–6
Aleksandr Chernyak	Shortcut	11	Aleksandr Chernyak	2, 4
ArtLine	Legends	12	Shota Abkhazava	1, 3–4, 6
ArtLine	Legends	21	Artem Kabakov	6
ArtLine	Legends	25	Oleg Chebatarev	1
ArtLine	Legends	31	Aleksey Khairov	3–4, 6
Mikhail Loboda	Shortcut	14	Mikhail Loboda	1, 4
Vitaly Zubenko	MitJet 2L	18	Vitaly Zubenko	4, 6–7
Nikolay Gadetsky	Shortcut	20	Nikolay Gadetsky	2
Nikita Khudov	MitJet 2L	24	Nikita Khudov	4
Gleb Mishutin	Shortcut	27	Gleb Mishutin	4
Pavel Kuzminov	Shortcut	35	Pavel Kuzminov	All
Artem Viktorov	Shortcut	37	Artem Viktorov	2–4, 6
Vyacheslav Kozlov	Shortcut	47	Vyacheslav Kozlov	4
Aleksandr Dudarev	Shortcut	55	Aleksandr Dudarev	1–2, 4
Vintic & Shpuntic	Shortcut	67	Stepan Krumilov	4–5, 7
David Pogosyan	Shortcut	74	David Pogosyan	1, 4
Svyatoslav Arsenov	MitJet 2L	77	Svyatoslav Arsenov	2–3, 5–6

== Calendar and results ==
The 2020 schedule was announced on 28 November 2019, with all events scheduled to be held in Russia. After the restrictions caused by the COVID-19 pandemic, on June 22, an updated calendar of SMP RCRS 2020 is presented.

Rnd.		Circuit	Date	Touring winner	SP winner	TL winner	S1600 winner	Junior winner	GT4 winner	CN winner
1	1	Smolensk Ring, Smolensk	11-12 July	Mikhail Mityav	Vladislav Nezvankin	Vladimir Sheshenin	Vasiliy Korablev	not held	Denis Remenyako	Shortcut: Aleksandr Dudarev; Legends: Shota Abkhazava
1	2	Smolensk Ring, Smolensk	11-12 July	Aleksey Dudukalo	Alexander Malinin	Vladimir Sheshenin	Vasiliy Korablev	not held	Aleksandr Vaintrub	Shortcut: Aleksandr Dudarev; Legends: Oleg Chebotarev
2	3	Igora Drive, Priozersk	25-26 July	Kirill Ladygin	Andrey Petukhov	Vladimir Sheshenin	Petr Plotnikov	Artemy Pershin	Denis Remenyako	Shortcut: Pavel Kuzminov; Mitjet: Svyatoslav Arsenov
2	4	Igora Drive, Priozersk	25-26 July	Ivan Lukashevich	Dmitry Lebedev	Nikolay Karamyshev	Petr Plotnikov	Egor Fokin	Denis Remenyako	Shortcut: Pavel Kuzminov; Mitjet: Svyatoslav Arsenov
3	5	Kazan Ring, Kazan	8-9 August	Klim Gavrilov	Vadim Antipov	Vladimir Sheshenin	Vasiliy Korablev	Nikita Dubinin	Denis Remenyako	Shortcut: Artem Viktorov; Legends: Aleksey Khairov; Mitjet: Svyatoslav Arsenov
3	6	Kazan Ring, Kazan	8-9 August	Kirill Ladygin	Vadim Antipov	Vladimir Sheshenin	Efim Gantmakher	Egor Fokin	Denis Remenyako	Shortcut: Pavel Kuzminov; Legends: Shota Abkhazava; Mitjet: Svyatoslav Arsenov
4	7	Moscow Raceway, Volokolamsk	22-23 August	Kirill Ladygin	Andrey Petukhov	Vladimir Sheshenin	Boris Shulmeister	Egor Fokin	Denis Remenyako	Shortcut: Aleksandr Dudarev; Legends: Shota Abkhazava; Mitjet: Vitaly Zubenko
4	8	Moscow Raceway, Volokolamsk	22-23 August	Andrey Maslennikov	Vadim Antipov	Vladimir Cherevan	Petr Plotnikov	Egor Ganin	Sergey Stolyarov	Shortcut: Mikhail Loboda; Legends: Shota Abkhazava; Mitjet: Vitaly Zubenko
5	9	Smolensk Ring, Smolensk	5-6 September	Ivan Lukashevich	Vladislav Nezvankin	Roman Golykov	Vasiliy Korablev	Egor Fokin	no entrants	Shortcut: Sergey Ievlev; Mitjet: no finishers
5	10	Smolensk Ring, Smolensk	5-6 September	Aleksey Dudukalo	Vadim Antipov	Vladimir Sheshenin	Vasiliy Korablev	Nikita Dubinin	no entrants	Shortcut: Stepan Krumilov; Mitjet: no finishers
6	11	NRING Circuit, Bogorodsk	19-20 September	Dmitry Bragin	Evgeniy Meites	Irina Sidorkova	Efim Gantmakher	Egor Fokin	Andrey Fedotov	Shortcut: Pavel Kuzminov; Legends: Artem Kabakov; Mitjet: Svyatoslav Arsenov
6	12	NRING Circuit, Bogorodsk	19-20 September	Kirill Ladygin	Dmitry Lebedev	Roman Golykov	Aleksey Savin	Egor Fokin	Andrey Fedotov	Shortcut: Pavel Kuzminov; Legends: Aleksey Khairov; Mitjet: Svyatoslav Arsenov
7	13	Fort Grozny Autodrom, Grozny	10-11 October	Klim Gavrilov	Vladislav Nezvankin	Leonid Panfilov	Mikhail Simonov	Egor Fokin	Denis Remenyako	Shortcut: Tatiana Dobrynina; Mitjet: Vitaly Zubenko
7	14	Fort Grozny Autodrom, Grozny	10-11 October	Andrey Radoshnov	Vadim Antipov	Vladimir Sheshenin	Efim Gantmakher	Egor Ganin	Denis Remenyako	Shortcut: Tatiana Dobrynina; Mitjet: Vitaly Zubenko

== Championship standings ==
Scoring systems

Position	1st	2nd	3rd	4th	5th	6th	7th	8th	9th	10th	11th	12th	13th	14th	15th	PP	FL
Points	25	20	16	13	11	10	9	8	7	6	5	4	3	2	1	**1**	1

=== Touring / TCR Russian Touring Car Championship ===
Pos.	Driver	SMO1		IGO		KAZ		MSC		SMO2		NRG		GRO		Pts.
1	Kirill Ladygin	2	3	**1**	Ret	9	1	**1**	9	4	2	14	1	7	5	211
2	Klim Gavrilov	DNS	DNS	8	3	1	2	11	1	9	3	5	5	**1**	6	183
3	Dmitry Bragin	4	6	2	14	6	5	2	5	6	8	1	6	4	4	177
4	Aleksey Dudukalo	8	1	3	4	2	13	7	Ret	7	1	**2**	8	10	8	174
5	Mikhail Mityaev	1	2	9	Ret	5	7	3	7	3	7	3	10	2	7	174
6	Ivan Lukashevich	**3**	12†	5	1	**Ret**	11	6	4	**1**	14†	10	9	5	3	155
7	Grigoriy Burlutskiy	6	4	7	Ret	3	3	5	8	2	5	Ret	Ret	9	2	142
8	Andrey Maslennikov	5	5	6	Ret	8	4	4	2	5	11	6	2	12	Ret	136
9	Pavel Kalmanovich	7	8	4	6	7	6	Ret	6	10	4	4	3	3	13	136
10	Andrey Radoshnov	Ret	Ret	13	2	10	12	9	3	8	12	7	DSQ	8	1	110
11	Rustam Fathutdinov	11	10	10	5	4	Ret	8	10	14	6	11	4	6	11	100
12	Lev Tolkachev	12	Ret	11	7	11	10	10	11	13	10	13	Ret	14	12	58
13	Ilya Yekushevskiy	10	7	Ret	12	14	9	12	13	11	Ret	8	11			53
14	Anton Nemkin	9	Ret	14	8	12	8	15	16	12	9					41
15	Vladimir Gorlach	13	9	Ret	11	13	14†	13	15	16	Ret	12	12	15	10	39
16	Timur Shigabutdinov											9	7	11	9	28
17	Pavel Yashin			12	10			14	12	15	13					20
18	Ibragim Akhmadov	14	11	15	9			17	14							17
19	Lev Nikitin			Ret	13											3
20	Marat Sharapov													13	Ret	3
21	Andrey Yushin							16	17							0
Pos.	Driver	SMO1		IGO		KAZ		MSC		SMO2		NRG		GRO		Pts.

Colour	Result
Gold	Winner
Silver	Second place
Bronze	Third place
Green	Points classification
Blue	Non-points classification
Blue	Non-classified finish (NC)
Purple	Retired, not classified (Ret)
Red	Did not qualify (DNQ)
Red	Did not pre-qualify (DNPQ)
Black	Disqualified (DSQ)
White	Did not start (DNS)
White	Withdrew (WD)
White	Race cancelled (C)
Blank	Did not practice (DNP)
Blank	Did not arrive (DNA)
Blank	Excluded (EX)

**Bold** – Pole
Italics – Fastest Lap

† – Drivers did not finish the race, but were classified as they completed over 75% of the race distance.

==== Touring / TCR Russian Touring Car Championship Team's Standings ====
Pos.	Team	SMO1		IGO		KAZ		MSC		SMO2		NRG		GRO		Pts.
1	LADA Sport Rosneft	1	2	1	Ret	5	1	1	7	3	2	3	1	2	5	385
1	LADA Sport Rosneft	2	3	9	Ret	9	7	3	9	4	7	14	10	7	7	385
2	Lukoil Racing Team	3	5	3	4	2	11	4	2	1	11	2	2	5	3	304
2	Lukoil Racing Team	5	12†	6	Ret	Ret	13	6	4	5	14†	6	8	12	Ret	304
3	Carville Racing	6	4	7	2	3	3	5	3	2	5	7	Ret	8	1	252
3	Carville Racing	Ret	Ret	13	Ret	10	12	9	8	8	12	Ret	DSQ	9	2	252
4	AG Team	7	8	4	5	4	6	8	6	10	4	4	3	3	11	236
4	AG Team	11	10	10	6	7	Ret	Ret	10	14	6	11	4	6	13	236
5	TAIF Motorsport	4	6	2	14	6	5	2	5	6	8	1	6	4	4	205
5	TAIF Motorsport											9	7	11	9	205
6	RUMOS Racing	12	9	11	7	11	10	10	11	13	10	12	12	14	10	97
6	RUMOS Racing	13	Ret	Ret	11	13	14	13	15	16	Ret	13	Ret	15	12	97
7	Racing Team			Ret	12	14	9	12	13	11	Ret	8	11			38
Pos.	Team	SMO1		IGO		KAZ		MSC		SMO2		NRG		GRO		Pts.

=== Super Production ===
Pos.	Driver	SMO1		IGO		KAZ		MSC		SMO2		NRG		GRO		Pts.
1	Vladislav Nezvankin	**1**	4	**2**	2	5	3	**6**	3	1	Ret	**2**	3	**1**	6	233
2	Vadim Antipov	7	2	4	4	**1**	1	4	1	5	1	4	8	Ret	1	231
3	Eugeny Meites	5	3	6	5	3	Ret	2	5	6	5	1	2	2	2	201
4	Andrey Petukhov	3	7	1	3	4	5†	1	4	3	4	8	4	3	Ret	198
5	Dmitry Lebedev			5	1	2	2	8	9	4	6	3	1	7	Ret	167
6	Nikolay Vikhanskiy	8	6	3	8			DNS	2	**2**	2	9	6	6	3	147
7	Aleksandr Garmash	6	Ret	7	6	6	4†	5	7	7	3	7	5	5	4	141
8	Pavel Pastushkov			8	7			7	6			6	7			55
9	Aleksandr Malinin	4	1													38
10	Ilsur Akhmetvaleev	2	5													31
11	Ilya Obzhigalov	Ret	Ret	Ret	DNS	Ret	DNS	3	8							24
12	Nikolay Serebryakov													4	Ret	13
13	Aleksandr Batov											5	Ret			11
14	Ekaterina Boyarinova													Ret	5	11
Pos.	Driver	SMO1		IGO		KAZ		MSC		SMO2		NRG		GRO		Pts.

† – Drivers did not finish the race, but were classified as they completed over 75% of the race distance.

==== Super Production Team's Standings ====
Pos.	Team	SMO1		IGO		KAZ		MSC		SMO2		NRG		GRO		Pts.
1	LADA Sport Rosneft	1	4	1	2	4	3	1	3	1	4	2	3	1	6	431
1	LADA Sport Rosneft	3	7	2	3	5	5	6	4	3	Ret	8	4	3	Ret	431
2	Sofit Racing Team	2	2	1	4	1	1	4	1	4	1	3	1	7	1	429
2	Sofit Racing Team	7	5	4	5	2	2	8	9	5	6	4	8	Ret	Ret	429
3	MEPhI RHHCC Racing Team	6	6	3	6	6	4	5	2	2	2	7	5	5	3	288
3	MEPhI RHHCC Racing Team	8	Ret	7	8	Ret	DNS	DNS	7	7	3	9	6	6	4	288
Pos.	Team	SMO1		IGO		KAZ		MSC		SMO2		NRG		GRO		Pts.

=== Touring Light ===
Pos.	Driver	SMO1		IGO		KAZ		MSC		SMO2		NRG		GRO		Pts.
1	Vladimir Sheshenin	1	1	1	2	**1**	1	1	3	2	1	2	11	2	1	306
2	Leonid Panfilov	5	3	**2**	3	6	3	2	2	7	6	7	3	1	5	212
3	Nikolay Karamyshev	7	6	7	1	3	4	Ret	5	5	2	3	2	5	3	187
4	Vladimir Cherevan	3	2	Ret	10	10	9	Ret	1	6	3	6	9	8	10	139
5	Rodion Shushakov	**2**	9	10	5	4	6	**Ret**	4	9	7	4	7	10	DNS	128
6	Andrey Sevastianov	Ret	8	5	9	9	5	3	6	3	5	10	10	9	8	125
7	Roman Golikov	9	7					6	Ret	1	4	8	1	**7**	9	115
8	Artem Fridman	8	4	3	6	7	2	4	Ret	11	10	Ret	Ret	11	7	115
9	Irina Sidorkova	6	Ret	9	12	11	8			12	8	**1**	8	3	4	110
10	Mikhail Simonov			6	4	2	7			**4**	Ret	DNS	4			79
11	Ilsur Akhmetvaleev			8	11	5	Ret	5	7	8	Ret	11	Ret			57
12	Aydar Nuriev											5	5	4	2	55
13	Aleksandr Salnikov	11	Ret	Ret	7	12	10	7	8	Ret	9	DNS	DNS			48
14	Mikhail Grachev											12†	6	6	6	34
15	Ildar Rakhmatullin	4	5	Ret	Ret	8	Ret									32
16	Artemy Lyakin	10	DNS	4	8											27
17	Tatiana Eliseeva									10	11	9	12			22
18	Ilya Rodkin											DSQ	Ret			0
Pos.	Driver	SMO1		IGO		KAZ		MSC		SMO2		NRG		GRO		Pts.

† – Drivers did not finish the race, but were classified as they completed over 75% of the race distance.

==== Touring Light Team's Standings ====
Pos.	Team	SMO1		IGO		KAZ		MSC		SMO2		NRG		GRO		Pts.
1	LADA Sport Rosneft	1	1	1	2	1	1	1	2	2	1	2	3	1	1	518
1	LADA Sport Rosneft	5	3	2	3	6	3	2	3	7	6	7	11	2	5	518
2	Rally Academy	6	6	7	1	3	4	Ret	1	5	2	3	2	5	3	313
2	Rally Academy	7	Ret	Ret	10	10	9	Ret	5	6	3	6	9	8	10	313
3	TBRacing	2	7	8	5	4	6	5	4	1	4	4	1	7	9	277
3	TBRacing	9	9	10	11	5	Ret	Ret	7	9	7	8	7	10	DNS	277
4	B-Tuning Pro Racing Team	Ret	8	5	9	9	5	3	6	3	5	9	10	8	9	147
4	B-Tuning Pro Racing Team									10	11	10	12			147
5	Fas Motorsport	8	4	3	6	7	2	4	Ret	11	10	Ret	Ret	11	7	115
Pos.	Team	SMO1		IGO		KAZ		MSC		SMO2		NRG		GRO		Pts.

=== S1600 ===
Pos.	Driver	SMO1		IGO		KAZ		MSC		SMO2		NRG		GRO		Pts.
1	Petr Plotnikov	16	3	1	1	1	5	2	1	5	7	2	Ret	2	7	221
2	Efim Gantmakher	3	8	6	5	2	1	6	2	Ret	DSQ	**1**	2	4	1	207
3	Boris Shulmeister	4	2	**2**	7	4	7	**1**	4	7	3	8	5	7	2	197
4	Ruslan Nafikov	**15**	1	8	6	5	4	4	Ret	3	4	3	3	5	3	172
5	Aleksey Savin	13	11	3	2	Ret	2	3	7	2	2	6	1	15	15	166
6	Filipp Tuponosov	1	4	9	11	3	6	14	5	4	5	7	10*	9	14	138*
7	Vasiliy Korablev	DSQ	DSQ	DSQ	DSQ	**DSQ**	3	5	10	**1**	1	4	DSQ	3	6	126
8	Vasiliy Vladykin	5	9	5	4	11	12	8	Ret	6	8	10	6	14	9	102
9	Dmitry Dudarev	6	10	7	9	9	15	10	6	11	9	5	13	12	8	92
10	Stanislav Novikov	11	5	16	8	Ret	8	7	8	14	13	9	4	6	11	89
11	Mikhail Dralin	9	12	12	13	8	Ret	12	12	12	14	15	7	10	12	60
12	Roman Shusharin	**DSQ**	**DSQ**	Ret	DNS	6	10	Ret	Ret	8	6	Ret	Ret	13	5	48
13	Aleksandr Builov			13	Ret	7	9	Ret	3	10	12	Ret	DNS			45
14	Igor Lvov	2	7	10	10											41
15	Mikhail Simonov													**1**	4	40
16	Ivan Tverdokhlebov	12	16	Ret	Ret	Ret	16	13	Ret	9	11	13	Ret	8	10	36
17	Sergey Schegolev	6	13	11	14	DSQ	DSQ	Ret	13	13	15	12	Ret			31
18	Vladimir Melnikov			4	3											29
19	Vadim Gagarin	7	6													19
20	Anatoly Ershikov					10	Ret	11	11			16	Ret			16
21	Kirill Larin							9	9							14
22	Boris Pevzner	10	14	15	15	DSQ	13									13
23	Ilya Gorbatskiy	Ret	DNS	17	12							11	12			13
24	David Pogosyan											17	9	11	Ret	12
25	Mikhail Kuldyaev					12	11									9
26	Artem Volkov											18	8			8
27	Maksim Kadakov									15	10					7
28	Dmitry Semenov											14	11			7
29	Dmitry Laskov													Ret	13	3
30	Ivan Tolcheev	14	15													3
31	Aleksandr Fadeev			14	16											2
32	Airat Zargirov					Ret	14									2
-	Aleksandr Maslennikov			WD	WD											-
Pos.	Driver	SMO1		IGO		KAZ		MSC		SMO2		NRG		GRO		Pts.

† – Drivers did not finish the race, but were classified as they completed over 75% of the race distance.

==== S1600 Team's Standings ====
Pos.	Team	SMO1		IGO		KAZ		MSC		SMO2		NRG		GRO		Pts.
1	Akhmat Racing Team	15	1	8	6	5	3	4	10	1	1	3	3	3	3	298
1	Akhmat Racing Team	DSQ	DSQ	DSQ	DSQ	DSQ	4	5	Ret	3	4	4	DSQ	5	6	298
2	Rumos Racing	3	5	6	5	2	1	6	2	14	13	1	2	4	1	296
2	Rumos Racing	11	8	16	8	Ret	8	7	8	Ret	DSQ	9	4	6	11	296
3	GTE Racing Team	1	4	5	4	3	6	8	5	4	5	7	6	9	9	240*
3	GTE Racing Team	5	9	9	11	11	12	14	Ret	6	8	10	10*	14	14	240*
4	Rally Academy	16	3	1	1	1	5	2	1	5	7	2	12	2	7	234
4	Rally Academy	Ret	DNS	17	12							11	Ret			234
5	Funky Racing Team	2	7	10	10	Ret	13									56
5	Funky Racing Team	10	14	15	15	DSQ	14									56
Pos.	Team	SMO1		IGO		KAZ		MSC		SMO2		NRG		GRO		Pts.

=== S1600 Junior ===
Pos.	Driver	SMO1	IGO		KAZ		MSC		SMO2		NRG		GRO		Pts.
1	Egor Fokin	not held	2	1	**2**	1	**1**	1	1	4	1	1	**1**	4	277
2	Egor Ganin	not held	3	2	Ret	2	4	2	3	2	2	2	2	1	214
3	Artemy Pershin	not held	**1**	3	4	Ret	3	3	4	5	4	4	7	2	167
4	Nikita Dubinin	not held	6	4	1	3	5	5	7	1	5	8	9	5	157
5	Jabrail Akhmadov	not held	5	10			2	8†	2	3	3	3	8	3	137
6	Stepan Anufriev	not held	8	9	6	6	8	7	8	7	7	9	6	7	104
7	Yaroslava Kopytina	not held	10	8	7	7	7	6	9†	Ret	Ret	6	5	8	87
8	Dmitry Galitsyn	not held	4	5	5	5	6	4							69
9	Artem Antonov	not held							5	8	**8**	5	3	9	62
10	Kirill Zakharov	not held							6	6	6	7	4	6	62
11	Amirkhan Faizrakhmanov	not held	7	7	3	4	Ret	**DSQ**							47
12	Ivan Kazarin	not held	9	6											17
13	Virsavia Goltsova	not held	11	11	DNQ	DNQ									10
Pos.	Driver	SMO1	IGO		KAZ		MSC		SMO2		NRG		GRO		Pts.

† – Drivers did not finish the race, but were classified as they completed over 75% of the race distance.

==== S1600 Junior Team's Standings ====
Pos.	Team	SMO1	IGO		KAZ		MSC		SMO2		NRG		GRO		Pts.
1	Rally Academy	not held	1	1	2	1	1	1	1	4	1	1	1	2	444
1	Rally Academy	not held	2	3	4	Ret	3	3	4	5	4	4	7	4	444
2	Anton Zakharov's Racing Academy	not held	3	2	5	2	4	2	3	2	2	2	2	1	345
2	Anton Zakharov's Racing Academy	not held	4	5	Ret	5	6	4	6	6	6	7	4	6	345
3	AG Team	not held	6	4	1	3	5	5	5	1	5	5	3	5	236
3	AG Team	not held	9	6					6	8	8	8	9	9	236
4	UMMC Motorsport	not held	7	7	3	4	8	7	8	7			6	7	135
4	UMMC Motorsport	not held	8	9	6	6	Ret	**DSQ**							135
Pos.	Team	SMO1	IGO		KAZ		MSC		SMO2		NRG		GRO		Pts.

=== GT4 ===
Pos.	Driver	SMO1		IGO		KAZ		MSC		SMO2	NRG		GRO		Pts.
1	Denis Remenyako	**1**	2	1	1	**1**	1	**1**	Ret	not held			**1**	1	229
2	Andrey Fedotov	3	3	6	5	3	2	3	3	not held	1	1			171
3	Andrey Goncharov							6	5	not held	**2**	2	3	2	100
4	Aleksandr Vaintrub	2	1	**2**	2					not held					89
5	Sergey Stolyarov					2	3	2	1	not held					82
6	Aleksey Bashmakov			4	4			4	2	not held					59
7	Konstantin Zakharevsky			5	6			5	4	not held					45
8	Aleksandr Maslennikov			3	3					not held					32
9	Anton Nemkin									not held			2	Ret	21
10	Eugeny Kulikov			Ret	DNS			7	6	not held					19
Pos.	Driver	SMO1		IGO		KAZ		MSC		SMO2	NRG		GRO		Pts.

† – Drivers did not finish the race, but were classified as they completed over 75% of the race distance.

==== GT4 Team's Standings ====
Pos.	Team	SMO1	IGO		KAZ		MSC		SMO2	NRG	GRO		Pts.
1	Capital Racing Team		1	1	1	1	1	Ret	not held		1	1	184
Pos.	Team	SMO1	IGO		KAZ		MSC		SMO2	NRG	GRO		Pts.
