= V1 Auto World Tianjin =

Motorsport circuit in Tianjin, China

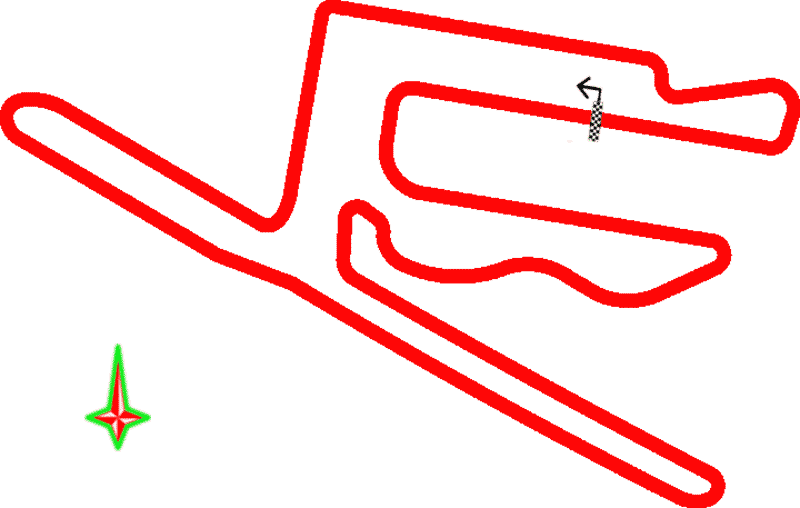
- International Professional Driver Circuit (2021–present)
- Location: Wuqing, Tianjin, China
- Coordinates: 39°22′59″N 116°59′30.3″E
- FIA Grade: 2
- Broke ground: April 2017; 9 years ago
- Opened: 2018
- Architect: Hermann Tilke
- Major events: Current: F4 China (2026); Former: Porsche Carrera Cup Asia (2022); Clio Cup China (2019)

International Professional Driver Circuit (2021–present)
- Surface: Asphalt
- Length: 4.290 km (2.666 mi)
- Turns: 19
- Race lap record: 1:53.792 ( (China) Josh Feng, Mygale M21-F4, 2026, F4)

Professional Driver Experience Circuit (2018–present)
- Surface: Asphalt
- Length: 2.500 km (1.553 mi)
- Turns: 14

'E' Circuit (2018–2019)
- Surface: Asphalt
- Length: 3.720 km (2.312 mi)
- Turns: 15
- Race lap record: 1:33.300 ( (Australia) Josh Burdon, Ligier JS P3, 2018, LMP3)

The V1 Auto World Tianjin is a motorsport circuit located in Wuqing, Tianjin, China. It was designed by Hermann Tilke and opened in 2018.

== History ==
Construction of the V1 Auto World Tianjin began in April 2017 and was completed in 2018. In subsequent years, surrounding streets were incorporated, so that the longest version of the route includes a semi-permanent street circuit with 19 curves and up to 4.290 km (2.666 mi) in length. This is homologated according to FIA Grade 2. That configuration was preceded by the "E-Circuit", which was completed in 2019, was 3.720 km (2.312 mi) long and homologated to FIA Grade 3.

== Lap records ==
As of May 2026, the fastest official race lap records at the V1 Auto World Tianjin are listed as:

Category	Time	Driver	Vehicle	Event
International Professional Driver Circuit (2021–present): 4.290 km (2.666 mi)
Formula 4	1:53.792	Josh Feng	Mygale M21-F4	2026 Tianjin Chinese F4 round
'E' Circuit (2018–2019): 3.720 km (2.312 mi)
LMP3	1:33.300	Josh Burdon	Ligier JS P3	2018 Tianjin China Endurance Series round
