= A1 Motor Park =

Motor racing circuit in Bulgaria

- Location: Samokov, Sofia Province, Bulgaria
- Coordinates: 42°18′54.85″N 23°32′18.16″E
- Capacity: 20,000
- FIA Grade: 3
- Broke ground: 10 March 2025; 20 months ago
- Opened: 21 March 2026; 7 months ago
- Architect: Tsvetan Petrov
- Website: https://a1motorpark.com/

Car Circuit (2026)
- Length: 3.910 km (2.430 mi)
- Turns: 15

Motorcycle Circuit (2026)
- Length: 3.960 km (2.461 mi)
- Turns: 16
- Race lap record: 1:34.312 ( (Czech Republic) Michal Filla, Ducati Panigale V4 R, 2026, SBK)

A1 Motor Park is a 3.910 km (2.430 mi) permanent motor racing circuit in Samokov, Bulgaria, about 55 km (34 mi) south of the national capital Sofia. The race circuit was founded as Lara Racing Circuit.

== History ==
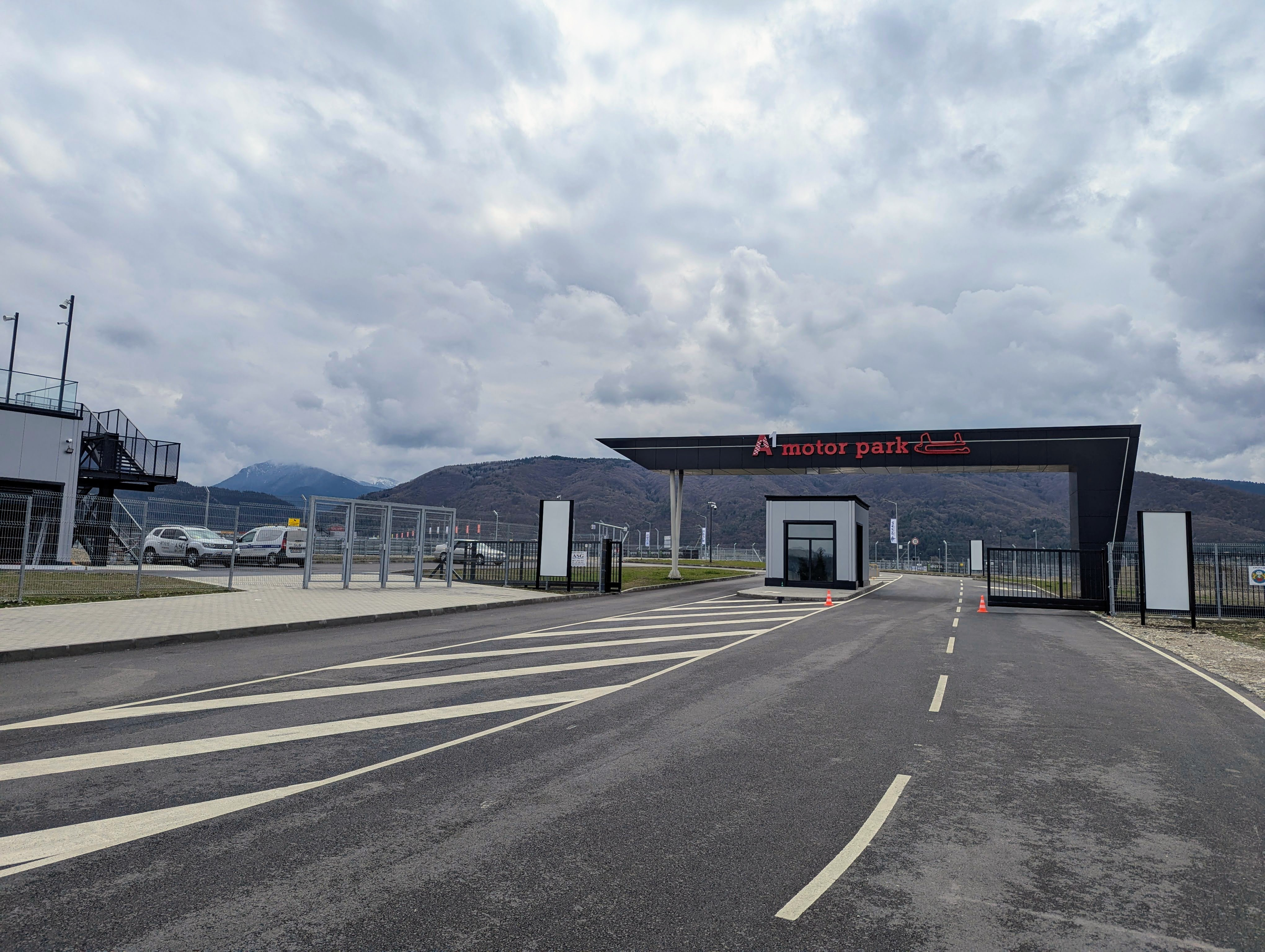
Main entrance of A1 Motor Park

The project construction begun on 10 March 2025, near Samokov, Bulgaria, financed by private investment. The circuit was planned to meet FIA Grade 3 standards and FIM Category BA, suitable for Formula 3 races and all motorcycle races except MotoGP.

On 9 December 2025, it was announced that telecommunications company, A1 Bulgaria, would become title sponsor of the circuit.

The track was officially opened on 21 March 2026, with local Formula 2 driver Nikola Tsolov the first to complete laps in a Dallara GP2/11. On 24 March, the unofficial lap record was set as by Pavel Lefterov in a Porsche 911 GT3 R (992) with a time of 1:30.991. On 20 April 2026, another unofficial lap record was set by Georgi Donchev in a Lamborghini Huracán GT3 Evo 2 with a time of 1:30.579.

== Facilities ==
The park's main feature is a 3.910 km (2.430 mi) race track designed to meet:

- FIA Grade 3 specifications, allowing it to host series such as Formula 3, GT3, and endurance races.
- FIM Grade B certification for international motorcycle events.

The route can be configured into 21 different layouts, ranging from 1.090 to 3.910 km (0.677 to 2.430 mi). According to the FIA, the venue is the first in the Balkans to meet FIA Grade 3 standards.

== Lap records ==
As of September 2026, the fastest official race lap records at the A1 Motor Park are listed as:

Category	Time	Driver	Vehicle	Event
Motorcycle Circuit (2026): 3.960 km (2.461 mi)
Superbike	1:34.312	Michal Filla	Ducati Panigale V4 R	2026 Samokov Alpe Adria Superbike round
Supersport	1:40.017	Andrea Zappa	Krämer SSP 600 NG	2026 Samokov Alpe Adria Supersport round
Sportbike	1:47.867	Lukacs Owen	Kawasaki Ninja ZX-6R 636	2026 Samokov Alpe Adria Sportbike round
Supersport 300	1:49.697	Oğuz Taşhan	Kawasaki Ninja 400	2026 Samokov Alpe Adria Supersport 300 round
