= Novozhilovo, Leningrad Oblast =

Novozhilovo Новожилово
- Village
- Location within Leningrad Oblast Location within Russia
- Coordinates: 60°30′40″N 30°09′35″E
- Country: Russia
- Region: Leningrad Oblast
- District: Priozersky District
- Municipality: Sosnovskoye Rural Settlement
- Time zone: UTC+3:00

Novozhilovo (Russian: Новожилово; Finnish: Suvenmäki) is a rural locality (a village) in Sosnovskoye Rural Settlement of Priozersky District, Leningrad Oblast, of northwest Russia. Population: 28 (2010 census); 31 (2002 census);

It is the location of the motorsport complex Igora Drive, designed by Hermann Tilke.
