= Biltzheim =

Commune in Grand Est, France

- Commune
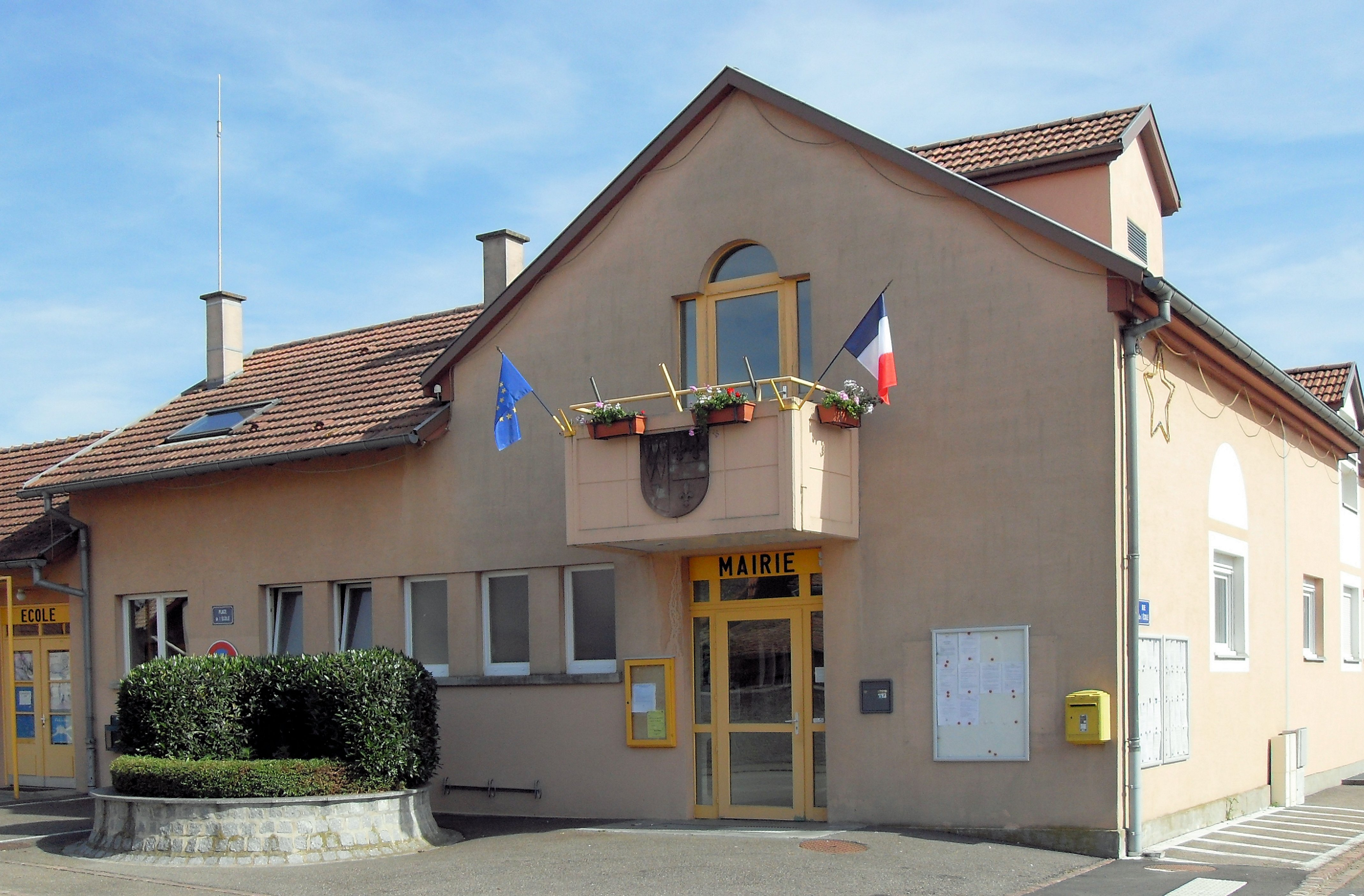
- The town hall in Biltzheim

- Coat of arms
- Location of Biltzheim
- Location within France Location within Grand Est
- Coordinates: 47°57′30″N 7°23′20″E
- Country: France
- Region: Grand Est
- Department: Haut-Rhin
- Arrondissement: Thann-Guebwiller
- Canton: Ensisheim
- Intercommunality: Centre Haut-Rhin

Government
  - Mayor (2020–2026): Gilbert Vonau
- Area^{1}: 7.15 km^{2} (2.76 sq mi)
- Elevation: 202 m (663 ft)
- Highest elevation: 206 m (676 ft)
- Lowest elevation: 199 m (653 ft)
- Population (2023): 510
  - Density: 71/km^{2} (180/sq mi)
- Time zone: UTC+01:00 (CET)
  - Summer (DST): UTC+02:00 (CEST)
- INSEE/Postal code: 68037 /68127
- ^{1} French Land Register data, which excludes lakes, ponds, glaciers > 1 km^{2} (0.386 sq mi or 247 acres) and river estuaries.

Biltzheim (German: Bilzheim, before 2003: Bilzheim) is a commune in the Haut-Rhin department in Grand Est in north-eastern France, about 35 km north of Mulhouse.

== See also ==
- Communes of the Haut-Rhin department
