= 2025 Russian Circuit Racing Series =

Motor racing season

The 2025 SMP Russian Circuit Racing Series was the twelfth season of the Russian Circuit Racing Series, organized by SMP Racing. It was the eleventh season with international TCR class cars. In 2025, the competition was held in six classes: Touring, Touring Light, Super Production, S1600, GT4 and CN. This season, the RCRS also hosted races of the revived SMP Formula 4 series.

2025 SMP Russian Circuit Racing Series

== Teams and drivers ==
Yokohama was the official tyre supplier.

=== Touring / TCR Russian Touring Car Championship ===
Teams claimed for team points

Team	Car	No.	Drivers	Rounds
(Russia) Lukoil Racing Twins Team	Cupra León VZ TCR	1	(Russia) Mikhail Simonov	All
(Russia) Lukoil Racing Twins Team	Cupra León VZ TCR	16	(Russia) Artem Slutsky	All
(Russia) Lukoil Racing Twins Team	Hyundai Elantra N TCR	14	(Russia) Zakhar Slutsky	All
(Russia) SMP Racing	Cupra León VZ TCR	2	(Russia) Aleksandr Smolyar	2–7
(Russia) SMP Racing	Hyundai i30 N TCR	2	(Russia) Aleksandr Smolyar	1
(Russia) SMP Racing	Hyundai i30 N TCR	10	(Russia) Vladimir Atoev	1–2
(Russia) SMP Racing	Cupra León VZ TCR	10	(Russia) Vladimir Atoev	3–7
(Russia) SMP Racing	Hyundai i30 N TCR	7	(Russia) Kirill Smal	7
(Russia) TAIF Motorsport	Cupra León VZ TCR	4	(Russia) Dmitry Bragin	All
(Russia) TAIF Motorsport	Cupra León VZ TCR	5	(Russia) Petr Plotnikov	All
(Russia) Innostage AG Team	Hyundai i30 N TCR	17	(Russia) Pavel Kalmanovich	All
(Russia) Innostage AG Team	Cupra León Competición TCR	18	(Russia) Rustam Fatkhutdinov	All
(Russia) Innostage AG Team	Audi RS 3 LMS TCR (2021)	20	(Russia) Egor Sanin	All
(Russia) LADA Sport Rosneft	LADA Vesta NG TCR	19	(Russia) Vladimir Sheshenin	1–4
(Russia) LADA Sport Rosneft	LADA Vesta NG TCR	23	(Russia) Artem Severiukhin	5–6
(Russia) LADA Sport Rosneft	LADA Vesta NG TCR	23	(Russia) Yaroslav Shevyrtalov	7
(Russia) LADA Sport Rosneft	LADA Vesta NG TCR	55	(Russia) Ivan Chubarov	All
(Russia) Iskra Motorsport	Audi RS 3 LMS TCR (2021)	77	(Russia) Anton Badoev	1

=== Super Production ===
Teams claimed for team points

Team	Car	No.	Drivers	Rounds
(Russia) ITECO Racing Team	LADA Granta Cup	8	(Russia) Aleksey Timichev	6–7
(Russia) ITECO Racing Team	Subaru BRZ	21	(Russia) Maksim Arkhangelsky	1–5
(Russia) ITECO Racing Team	Subaru BRZ	44	(Russia) Samvel Iskoyants	6–7
(Russia) ITECO Racing Team	Subaru BRZ	50	(Russia) Maksim Turiev	All
(Russia) ITECO Racing Team	Subaru BRZ	81	(Russia) Timofey Buyanov	All
(Russia) LADA Sport Rosneft	LADA Vesta NG	29	(Russia) Andrey Petukhov	All
(Russia) LADA Sport Rosneft	LADA Vesta NG	99	(Russia) Leonid Panfilov	All
(Russia) Neva Motorsport Race Hub	Honda Civic Type R FN2	33	(Russia) Roman Golykov	All
(Russia) Neva Motorsport Race Hub	Honda Civic Type R EP3	88	(Russia) Nikolay Vikhansky	1–6
(Russia) Ravikov Dmitry	Mazda 3	51	(Russia) Dmitry Ravikov	5
(Russia) Shield Rock MEPHI Racing Team	Volkswagen Scirocco	80	(Russia) Aleksandr Garmash	All
(Russia) Shield Rock MEPHI Racing Team	Volkswagen Scirocco	777	(Russia) Kirill Glushak	1–3, 5–7

=== Touring Light ===
Teams claimed for team points

Team	Car	No.	Drivers	Rounds
(Russia) Rumos Racing	Kia Rio X 1.5T	4	(Russia) Ivan Stepanov	5
(Russia) Rumos Racing	Kia Rio X 1.5T	28	(Russia) Azat Kalimullin	6
(Russia) PSM Sport	Hyundai Solaris II 1.6T	7	(Russia) Aleksandr Salnikov	1–6
(Russia) PSM Sport	Hyundai Solaris II 1.6T	77	(Russia) Daniil Gryaznov	3–6
(Russia) Kuzma’s Mother Racing Team	Kia Rio X 1.6T	12	(Russia) Nikolay Karamyshev	All
(Russia) Kuzma’s Mother Racing Team	Kia Rio X 1.6T	17	(Russia) Vladimir Cherevan	All
(Russia) Kuzma’s Mother Racing Team	Kia Rio X 1.6T	33	(Russia) Dmitry Dudarev	All
(Russia) Russian Racing Group	Mini JCW F56 1.6T	13	(Russia) Stepan Anufriev	1–2
(Russia) B-Tuning Pro Racing	Audi A1 8X 1.4T	15	(Russia) Ivan Bozhedomov	All
(Russia) B-Tuning Pro Racing	Mini JCW F56 1.6T	16	(Russia) Tatiana Eliseeva	1–4, 6
(Russia) Lukoil Racing	Audi A1 8X 1.4T	21	(Russia) Daniil Kovalev	1–5
(Russia) Lukoil Racing	Audi A1 8X 1.4T	43	(Russia) Andrey Maslennikov	All
(Russia) Innostage AG Team	Audi A1 6B 1.5T	24	(Russia) Kirill Zinoviev	All
(Russia) Innostage AG Team	Audi A1 6B 1.5T	32	(Russia) Aleksandr Chachava	All
(Russia) Bragin Racing Team	Skoda Fabia 1.5T	25	(Russia) Maksim Soldatov	All
(Russia) Bragin Racing Team	Skoda Fabia 1.5T	34	(Russia) Ivan Zhuravlev	1–3, 5–7
(Russia) Bragin Racing Team	Skoda Fabia 1.5T	66	(Belarus) Aleksey Savin	All
(Russia) Powerfuls	Kia Rio X 1.5T	37	(Russia) Denis Karelin	All
(Russia) Powerfuls	Volkswagwn Polo 1.4T	44	(Russia) Samvel Iskoyants	1–6
(Russia) Rally Academy	Volkswagwn Polo 1.4T	49	(Russia) Ivan Tverdokhlebov	1–6
(Russia) Rally Academy	Volkswagwn Polo 1.4T	80	(Russia) Oleg Kravtsov	2, 4–5
(Russia) Kokorev Racing	Kia Rio X 1.6T	99	(Russia) Stanislav Kokorev	5–7

=== S1600 ===
Teams claimed for team points

Team	Car	No.	Drivers	Rounds
(Russia) GTE Racing Team (Russia) GTE Racing Team Plus (Russia) LADA Sport Rosneft (74)	Lada Granta FL	19	(Russia) Vladimir Sheshenin	5–7
(Russia) GTE Racing Team (Russia) GTE Racing Team Plus (Russia) LADA Sport Rosneft (74)	Lada Granta FL	28	(Russia) Azat Kalimullin	1–2, 4–5
(Russia) GTE Racing Team (Russia) GTE Racing Team Plus (Russia) LADA Sport Rosneft (74)	Lada Granta FL	74	(Russia) Kirill Antonov	6
(Russia) GTE Racing Team (Russia) GTE Racing Team Plus (Russia) LADA Sport Rosneft (74)	Lada Granta FL	84	(Russia) Philipp Tuponosov	All
(Russia) GTE Racing Team (Russia) GTE Racing Team Plus (Russia) LADA Sport Rosneft (74)	Lada Granta FL	96	(Russia) Albert Zinatov	1–5
(Russia) GTE Racing Team (Russia) GTE Racing Team Plus (Russia) LADA Sport Rosneft (74)	Lada Granta FL	100	(Russia) Ruslan Safin	All
(Russia) GTE Racing Team (Russia) GTE Racing Team Plus (Russia) LADA Sport Rosneft (74)	Lada Granta FL	115	(Russia) Konstantin Shitov	1–2, 4, 6–7
(Russia) ALGA Motorsport	Hyundai Solaris	23	(Germany) Kai Richard Schick	All
(Russia) Salavat Racing Team	Hyundai Solaris	31	(Russia) Rifat Gallyamov	4
(Russia) Powerfuls	Kia Rio	54	(Russia) Mikhail Pochenkov	All
(Russia) Powerfuls	Kia Rio	79	(Russia) Aleksandr Pochenkov	All
(Russia) Parus	Kia Rio X	56	(Russia) Vasily Korablev	1, 3–4, 6
(Russia) PSM Sport	Hyundai Solaris	77	(Russia) Daniil Gryaznov	1
(Russia) Kuzma’s Mother Racing Team	Kia Rio X	82	(Russia) Vakhtang Dimitradze	1–3, 5–6

=== GT4 ===
Teams claimed for team points

Team	Car	No.	Drivers	Rounds	Co-Driver for Cup Stage
(Russia) Rumos Racing	Toyota GR Supra GT4 Evo 2	8	(Russia) Ilya Sidorov	1–2, CS, 6	(Russia) Stanislav Novikov
(Russia) Rumos Racing	Toyota GR Supra GT4 Evo 2	17	(Russia) Stanislav Novikov	All (4)	
(Russia) Team Garis	Toyota GR Supra GT4 Evo 2	11	(Russia) Dmitry Rodionov	All, CS	(Russia) Sergey Borisov
(Russia) Team Garis	Toyota GR Supra GT4 Evo 2	56	(Russia) Dmitry Anastasiadis	2, 6–7	
(Russia) SMP Racing by Capital RT	Mercedes-AMG GT4	13	(Russia) Denis Remenyako	All, CS	
(Russia) SMP Racing by Capital RT	Mercedes-AMG GT4	51	(Russia) Irina Sidorkova	All, CS	(Russia) Aleksandr Smolyar
(Russia) Yadro Motorsport	Mercedes-AMG GT4	16	(Russia) Sergey Stolyarov	1–2	
(Russia) X Motorsport	Toyota GR Supra GT4 Evo	19	(Russia) Viktor Titarenko	1–2, CS	(Russia) Sergey Titarenko
(Russia) RScar Motorsport	Mercedes-AMG GT4	24	(Russia) Nikita Silaev	1–2, CS, 6	(Russia) Aleksey Nesov
(Russia) BMW Time 4 Race	BMW M4 GT4	55	(Russia) Roman Smolyakov	1–2, CS	
(Russia) BMW Time 4 Race	Toyota GR Supra GT4 Evo	77	(Russia) Andrey Goncharov	1–2, CS, 6	(Russia) Aleksandr Maslennikov
(Russia) Motor Sharks	Mercedes-AMG GT4	62	(Russia) Ivan Lukashevich	All	
(Russia) Motor Sharks	Mercedes-AMG GT4	83	(Russia) Anton Nemkin	All	
(Russia) Quantum Racing	Toyota GR Supra GT4 Evo	95	(Russia) Denis Pomogalov	CS	(Russia) Petr Biryukov

=== Sports prototype CN ===
Teams claimed for team points

Team	Car	No.	Drivers	Rounds
(Russia) Piter Rally	527 Shortcut	1	(Russia) Andrey Gromov	All (6)
(Russia) Piter Rally	527 Shortcut	80	(Russia) Mikhail Kaystryukov	All
(Belarus) SDYUSTSH for motorsports	Legends 600; MitJet 1300	4	(Belarus) Vladimir Gorlach	1–3, 5
(Belarus) SDYUSTSH for motorsports	Legends 600; MitJet 1300	5	(Belarus) Sergey Lapitsky	1, 3
(Belarus) SDYUSTSH for motorsports	Legends 600; MitJet 1300	500	(Belarus) Artem Maksimchuk	3, 5
(Belarus) SDYUSTSH for motorsports	MitJet 1300	44	(Belarus) Egor Blagodarov	3
(Belarus) SDYUSTSH for motorsports	MitJet 1300	47	(Belarus) Danila Chernega	3
(Belarus) SDYUSTSH for motorsports	MitJet 1300	86	(Belarus) Nikita Ivanov	3
(Belarus) SDYUSTSH for motorsports	MitJet 1300	770	(Belarus) Sergey Gurlenya	3
(Belarus) SDYUSTSH for motorsports	MitJet 1300	800	(Belarus) Igor Yakubovich	3
(Russia) Vrulin Nikolay	527 Shortcut	6	(Russia) Nikolay Vrulin	All
(Russia) Dobrynina Tatiana	527 Shortcut	7	(Russia) Tatiana Dobrynina	1–2
(Russia) Viktorov Artem	527 Shortcut	8	(Russia) Artem Viktorov	1–3, 5
(Russia) Dudarev Motorsport	527 Shortcut	9	(Russia) Yriy Sunyaev	All
(Russia) Dudarev Motorsport	527 Shortcut	16	(Russia) Aleksandr Nazarov	All
(Russia) Texol Racing	Legends EVO	10	(Russia) Vladimir Strelchenko	1, 5
(Russia) Texol Racing	Legends EVO	12	(Kazakhstan) Shota Abkhazava	1–3, 5
(Russia) Texol Racing	Legends EVO	24	(Russia) Vyacheslav Kiselev	1–5
(Russia) Texol Racing	Legends EVO	33	(Kazakhstan) Aleksandr Abkhazava	2–5
(Russia) Texol Racing	Legends EVO	61	(Russia) Aleksandr Nesterov	3–5
(Russia) Texol Racing	Legends EVO	62	(Russia) Rais Minnakhmetov	4
(Russia) Texol Racing	Legends EVO	221	(Russia) Artem Kabakov	1–5
(Russia) Texol Racing	Legends EVO	333	(Russia) Georgy Kudryavtsev	5
(Russia) Texol Racing	Legends EVO	777	(Russia) Andrey Kovalsky	2
(Russia) Texol Racing	Legends EVO	98	(Russia) Pavel Petrukhin	4
(Russia) Texol Racing	Legends 600	89	(Russia) Pavel Petrukhin	1–3, 5
(Russia) Texol Racing	Legends 600	17	(Russia) Yury Ryazantsev	1–2, 5
(Russia) Texol Racing	Legends 600	58	(Russia) Efim Lev	2–3, 5
(Russia) Texol Racing	Legends 600	73	(Russia) Sergey Aglish	2
(Russia) Texol Racing	Legends 600	81	(Russia) Daniil Zubenkov	5
(Russia) SVL CSKA Racing	527 Shortcut	11	(Russia) Aleksey Chernov	2, 6
(Russia) SVL CSKA Racing	527 Shortcut	31	(Russia) Aleksey Khairov	2, 6
(Russia) Leontiev Artem	527 Shortcut	13	(Russia) Artem Leontiev	2–6
(Russia) Balchug Racing	527 Shortcut	15	(Russia) Boris Shulmeyster	All
(Russia) Balchug Racing	527 Shortcut	21	(Russia) Kirill Kirakozov	1–2
(Russia) Balchug Racing	527 Shortcut	93	(Russia) Sergey Valuyskikh	All
(Russia) Balchug Racing	527 Shortcut	96	(Russia) Dmitry Eliseev	1–3, 5
(Russia) Kramar Motorsport	527 Shortcut	22	(Russia) Egor Grachev	1–5
(Russia) Kramar Motorsport	527 Shortcut	63	(Russia) Zakhar Makushin	2, 5–6
(Russia) Kramar Motorsport	527 Shortcut	74	(Russia) Igor Shunailov	All
(Russia) Kramar Motorsport	527 Shortcut	77	(Russia) Damir Saitov	All
(Russia) Kramar Motorsport	527 Shortcut	100	(Russia) Anton Mezhenin	1, 3–4
(Russia) Ilyachev Valentin	527 Shortcut	32	(Russia) Valentin Ilyachev	3
(Russia) Team Garis	MitJet 2L	34	(Russia) Maksim Miroshnichenko	1–5
(Russia) Team Garis	MitJet 2L	45	(Russia) Anton Khrapykin	1–4
(Russia) Team Garis	MitJet 2L	49	(Russia) Ivan Tverdokhlebov	1–3, 5
(Russia) Team Garis	MitJet 2L	50	(Russia) Yanis Petrovsky	1–5
(Russia) Team Garis	MitJet 2L	56	(Russia) Dmitry Anastasiadis	4
(Russia) Team Garis	MitJet 2L	99	(Russia) Semen Kharchenko	1–5
(Russia) Team Garis	MitJet 2L	101	(Russia) Dmitry Rodionov	3–5
(Russia) Team Garis	MitJet 2L	111	(Russia) Eugeny Samoilov	1–5
(Russia) Kuzminov Pavel	527 Shortcut	35	(Russia) Pavel Kuzminov	2
(Russia) NV Racing	527 Shortcut	42	(Russia) Anton Rybkin	All
(Russia) NV Racing	527 Shortcut	68	(Russia) Ivan Vershinin	All
(Russia) Quantum Racing	MitJet 2L	57	(Russia) Petr Biryukov	1–5
(Russia) Quantum Racing	MitJet 2L	97	(Russia) Denis Pomogalov	1–5
(Russia) Balashkov Danil	527 Shortcut	66	(Russia) Danil Balashkov	2–6
(Russia) Skorik Maksim	527 Shortcut	67	(Russia) Maksim Skorik	3
(Russia) Boyarinova Ekaterina	527 Shortcut	88	(Russia) Ekaterina Boyarinova	All
(Russia) Shutemov Aleksandr	527 Shortcut	160	(Russia) Aleksandr Shutemov	All

=== BR03 ===
As part of the 5th stage of RCRS at Moscow Raceway, an exhibition race of the future monocup was held on BR03 sports prototypes developed by BR Engineering. The race was attended by 12 cars driven by Sergey Sirotkin, Vitaly Petrov, Mikhail Aleshin, Kirill Ladygin, Vladimir Sheshenin, Irina Sidorkova, Viktor Shaitar, Alexander Smolyar, Mikhail Simonov, Sergey Titarenko, Maxim Turiev and Kirill Kirakozov. Sirotkin, Petrov and Smolyar remained in the top three at the end of the half-hour race.

== Calendar and results ==
Calendar is presented on 8 October 2024 and includes 8 rounds and was adjusted on 27 February 2025 includes 7 rounds Not all classes will be represented in every round.

Rnd.	Circuit	Date	Touring winner	SP winner	TL winner	S1600 winner	GT4 winner	CN winners
1	Moscow Raceway, Volokolamsk	15–18 May	R1: Mikhail Simonov; R2: Pavel Kalmanovich	R1: Maksim Turiev; R2: Maksim Turiev	R1: Maksim Soldatov; R2: Aleksey Savin	R1: Aleksandr Pochenkov; R2: Kay Richard Schick	R1: Irina Sidorkova; R2: Stanislav Novikov; R3: Denis Remenyako	R1: Shortcut: Andrey Gromov; Legends EVO: Shota Abkhazava; Mitjet: Denis Pomogalov; Legends 600: Sergey Lapitsky; R2: Shortcut: Andrey Gromov; Legends EVO: Vyacheslav Kiselev; Mitjet: Semen Kharchenko; Legends 600: Sergey Lapitsky
2	Igora Drive, Priozersk	20–22 June	R1: Ivan Chubarov; R2: Dmitry Bragin	R1: Leonid Panfilov; R2: Nikolay Vikhansky	R1: Denis Karelin; R2: Samvel Iskoyants	R1: Aleksandr Pochenkov; R2: Kai Richard Schick	R1: Denis Remenyako; R2: Ivan Lukashevich; R3: Sergey Stolyarov	R1: Shortcut: Aleksey Khairov; Legends EVO: Aleksandr Abkhazava; Mitjet: Semen Kharchenko; Legends 600: Pavel Petrukhin; R2: Shortcut: Andrey Gromov; Legends EVO: Aleksandr Abkhazava; Mitjet: Semen Kharchenko; Legends 600: Vladimir Gorlach
3	NRING Circuit, Bogorodsk	11–13 July	R1: Aleksandr Smolyar; R2: Petr Plotnikov	R1: Leonid Panfilov; R2: Maksim Arkhangelsky	R1: Maksim Soldatov; R2: Aleksey Savin	R1: Kai Richard Schick; R2: Aleksandr Pochenkov	not held	R1: Shortcut: Andrey Gromov; Legends EVO: Aleksandr Abkhazava; Mitjet: Semen Kharchenko; Legends 600: Pavel Petrukhin; Mitjet 1300: Artem Maksimchuk; R2: Shortcut: Andrey Gromov; Legends EVO: Shota Abkhazava; Mitjet: Denis Pomogalov; Legends 600: Pavel Petrukhin; Mitjet 1300: Vladimir Gorlach
4	Kazan Ring, Kazan	25–27 July	R1: Mikhail Simonov; R2: Rustam Fatkhutdinov	R1: Roman Golykov; R2: Roman Golykov	R1: Ivan Tverdokhlebov; R2: Nikolay Karamyshev	R1: Kai Richard Schick; R2: Vasily Korablev	not held	R1: Shortcut: Igor Shunailov; Legends EVO: Aleksandr Abkhazava; Mitjet: Denis Pomogalov; R2: Shortcut: Andrey Gromov; Legends EVO: Aleksandr Abkhazava; Mitjet: Semen Kharchenko
5	Moscow Raceway, Volokolamsk	21–24 August	R1: Aleksandr Smolyar; R2: Egor Sanin	R1: Maksim Turiev; R2: Leonid Panfilov	R1: Maksim Soldatov; R2: Ivan Zhuravlev	R1: Philipp Tuponosov; R2: Kai Richard Schick	R1: Irina Sidorkova and Aleksandr Smolyar; R2: Irina Sidorkova and Aleksandr Smolyar	R1: Shortcut: Aleksandr Shutemov; Legends EVO: Aleksandr Abkhazava; Mitjet: Denis Pomogalov; Legends 600: Pavel Petrukhin; R2: Shortcut: Igor Shunailov; Legends EVO: Aleksandr Abkhazava; Mitjet: Petr Biriukov; Legends 600: Vladimir Gorlach
6	Kazan Ring, Kazan	12–14 September	R1: Mikhail Simonov; R2: Rustam Fatkhutdinov	R1: Roman Golykov; R2: Maksim Turiev	R1: Denis Karelin; R2: Ivan Tverdokhlebov	R1: Kai Richard Schick; R2: Mikhail Pochenkov	R1: Irina Sidorkova; R2: Denis Remenyako; R3: Stanislav Novikov	R1: Shortcut: Andrey Gromov; Legends: not held Mitjet: not held R2: Shortcut: Andrey Gromov; Legends: not held Mitjet: not held
7	Fort Grozny Autodrom, Grozny	9–12 October	R1: Artem Slutsky; R2: Dmitry Bragin	R1: Maksim Turiev; R2: Samvel Iskoyants	R1: Maksim Soldatov; R2: Maksim Soldatov	R1: Mikhail Pochenkov; R2: Mikhail Pochenkov	R1: Ivan Lukashevich; R2: Ivan Lukashevich; R3: Ivan Lukashevich	not held

== Championship standings ==
Scoring systems

Position	1st	2nd	3rd	4th	5th	6th	7th	8th	9th	10th	11th	12th	13th	14th	15th	PP	FL
Qualification	10	8	6	4	2												
Race 1 Points	30	23	19	16	14	12	10	8	7	6	5	4	3	2	1	**1**	1
Race 2 Points	25	20	16	13	11	10	9	8	7	6	5	4	3	2	1	**1**	1

=== Touring / TCR Russian Touring Car Championship ===
Pos.	Driver	MSC1		IGO		NRG		KAZ1		MSC2		KAZ2		GRO		Pts.
1	Mikhail Simonov	1	8	3	4	4	5	1	4	3	7	1	3	10	12	257
2	Aleksandr Smolyar	6	Ret	**10**	3	**1**	6	4	8	**1**	4	3	2	**4**	13	254
2	Artem Slutsky	5	4	8	2	3	3	3	6	2	5	4	7	1	6	243
4	Zakhar Slutsky	11	5	2	6	8	12	**5**	7	4	8	**2**	6	3	9	205
5	Rustam Fatkhutdinov	3	Ret	7	5	2	9	11	1	12	12	8	1	5	2	184
6	Ivan Chubarov	**Ret**	6	1	8	6	7	6	5	7	11	7	10	2	5	180
7	Vladimir Atoev	8	11	9	7	12	4	2	3	6	6	5	4	6	11	178
8	Egor Sanin	2	3	4	Ret	5	8	12	9	10	1	10	9	7	7	161
9	Petr Plotnikov	7	2	12	9	9	1	9	Ret	5	2	12	5	8	3	156
10	Dmitry Bragin	4	10	6	1	11	10	8	2	8	10	6	Ret	12	1	154
11	Pavel Kalmanovich	9	1	5	11	7	2	7	Ret	9	9	11	11	13	4	131
12	Vladimir Sheshenin	10	7	11	10	10	11	10	10							49
13	Artem Severiukhin									11	3	9	8			36
14	Kirill Smal													9	8	15
15	Anton Badoev	12	9													11
16	Yaroslav Shevyrtalov													11	10	11
Pos.	Driver	MSC1		IGO		NRG		KAZ1		MSC2		KAZ2		GRO		Pts.

Colour	Result
Gold	Winner
Silver	Second place
Bronze	Third place
Green	Points classification
Blue	Non-points classification
Blue	Non-classified finish (NC)
Purple	Retired, not classified (Ret)
Red	Did not qualify (DNQ)
Red	Did not pre-qualify (DNPQ)
Black	Disqualified (DSQ)
White	Did not start (DNS)
White	Withdrew (WD)
White	Race cancelled (C)
Blank	Did not practice (DNP)
Blank	Did not arrive (DNA)
Blank	Excluded (EX)

**Bold** – Pole
Italics – Fastest Lap

† – Drivers did not finish the race, but were classified as they completed over 75% of the race distance.

==== Touring / TCR Russian Touring Car Championship Team's Standings ====
Pos.	Driver	MSC1		IGO		NRG		KAZ1		MSC2		KAZ2		GRO		Pts.
1	Lukoil Racing Twins Team	1	4	2	2	3	3	1	4	2	5	1	3	1	6	543
1	Lukoil Racing Twins Team	5	8	8	6	4	5	5	7	3	7	2	6	3	9	543
2	SMP Racing	6	11	9	3	1	4	2	3	1	4	3	2	4	11	432
2	SMP Racing	8	Ret	10	7	12	6	4	8	6	6	5	4	6	13	432
3	Innostage AG Team	2	1	4	5	2	2	7	1	10	1	10	9	5	2	334
3	Innostage AG Team	9	3	7	Ret	7	9	11	Ret	12	12	11	11	13	4	334
4	TAIF Motorsport	4	2	6	1	9	1	8	2	5	2	6	5	8	1	310
4	TAIF Motorsport	7	10	12	9	11	10	9	Ret	8	10	12	Ret	12	3	310
5	LADA Sport Rosneft	10	6	1	8	6	7	6	5	7	3	7	8	2	5	276
5	LADA Sport Rosneft	Ret	7	11	10	10	11	10	10	11	11	9	10	11	10	276
Pos.	Driver	MSC1		IGO		NRG		KAZ1		MSC2		KAZ2		GRO		Pts.

=== Super Production ===
Pos.	Driver	MSC1		IGO		NRG		KAZ1		MSC2		KAZ2		GRO		Pts.
1	Leonid Panfilov	4	5	1	7	1	4	3	5	2	1	2	3	2	5	306
2	Maksim Turiev	1	1	3	2	7	Ret	DSQ	2	**1**	5	3	1	**1**	8	279
3	Roman Golykov	Ret	2	5	4	**5**	6	**1**	1	DSQ	3	1	2	6†	3	267
4	Andrey Petukhov	3	3	2	3	8	DSQ	2	3	6	**2**	4	4	3	4	244
5	Nikolay Vikhansky	8	7	**6**	1	6	5	Ret	6	3	4	5	Ret			152
6	Timofey Buyanov	6	8	7	6	2	7	Ret	DSQ	5	7	7	Ret	DSQ	9	139
7	Aleksandr Garmash	7	6	8	5	4	3	5	4	7	Ret	Ret	5	DSQ	7	134
8	Kirill Glushak	5	Ret	4	Ret	3	2			DNS	8	8	6	4	2	131
9	Maksim Arkhangelsky	**2**	4	9	Ret	Ret	1	4	Ret	4	6					120
10	Samvel Iskoyants											6	7†	DSQ	1	52
11	Aleksey Timichev											WD	WD	5	6	24
12	Dmitry Ravikov									8	Ret					8
Pos.	Driver	MSC1		IGO		NRG		KAZ1		MSC2		KAZ2		GRO		Pts.

Colour	Result
Gold	Winner
Silver	Second place
Bronze	Third place
Green	Points classification
Blue	Non-points classification
Blue	Non-classified finish (NC)
Purple	Retired, not classified (Ret)
Red	Did not qualify (DNQ)
Red	Did not pre-qualify (DNPQ)
Black	Disqualified (DSQ)
White	Did not start (DNS)
White	Withdrew (WD)
White	Race cancelled (C)
Blank	Did not practice (DNP)
Blank	Did not arrive (DNA)
Blank	Excluded (EX)

**Bold** – Pole
Italics – Fastest Lap

† – Drivers did not finish the race, but were classified as they completed over 75% of the race distance.

==== Super Production Team's Standings ====
Pos.	Driver	MSC1		IGO		NRG		KAZ1		MSC2		KAZ2		GRO		Pts.
1	LADA Sport Rosneft	3	3	1	3	1	4	2	3	2	1	2	3	2	4	550
1	LADA Sport Rosneft	4	5	2	7	8	DSQ	3	5	6	2	4	4	3	5	550
2	ITECO Racing Team	1	1	3	2	2	7	4	2	1	5	3	1	1	1	464
2	ITECO Racing Team	2	4	7	6	7	Ret	DSQ	Ret	4	6	7	Ret	DSQ	8	464
3	NEVA Motorsport Race Hub	8	2	5	1	5	5	1	1	3	3	1	2	6	3	419
3	NEVA Motorsport Race Hub	Ret	7	6	4	6	6	Ret	6	DSQ	4	5	Ret			419
4	Shield Rock MEPHI Racing Team	5	6	4	5	3	2	5	4	7	8	8	5	4	2	265
4	Shield Rock MEPHI Racing Team	7	Ret	8	Ret	4	3			DNS	Ret	Ret	6	DSQ	7	265
Pos.	Driver	MSC1		IGO		NRG		KAZ1		MSC2		KAZ2		GRO		Pts.

=== Touring Light ===
Pos.	Driver	MSC1		IGO		NRG		KAZ1		MSC2		KAZ2		GRO		Pts.
1	Nikolay Karamyshev	**3**	4	**4**	11	**2**	4	6	1	2	6	3	7	3	6	275
2	Maksim Soldatov	1	3	8	7	1	6	5	2	1	13	Ret	6	**1**	1	269
3	Aleksey Savin	6	1	14	5	3	1	12	5	**8**	2	4	4	7	10	197
4	Denis Karelin	4	Ret	1	9	6	Ret	2	3	17	Ret	**1**	Ret	Ret	11	169
5	Andrey Maslennikov	2	5	6	Ret	5	7	4	13	12	9	2	5	6	Ret	159
6	Dmitry Dudarev	7	2	Ret	8	11	10	3	4	7	16	13†	3	4	4	156
7	Kirill Zinoviev	9	Ret	2	6	10	12	7	9	3	5	8	10	11†	2	148
8	Vladimir Cherevan	10	11	3	2	12	9	11	6	10	8	5	Ret	2	7	148
9	Ivan Tverdokhlebov	13	7	7	4	9	3	**1**	Ret	11	4	Ret	1			141
10	Samvel Iskoyants	5	13	Ret	1	4	8	15	Ret	5	18	Ret	2			115
11	Ivan Zhuravlev	12	10	13	3	8	14			6	1	9	8	5	9	112
12	Aleksandr Chachava	8	6	5	10	Ret	Ret	13	14	4	7	11	9	8	5	99
13	Ivan Bozhedomov	15	9	10	14	Ret	5	9	7	9	10	6	13	9	8	92
14	Aleksandr Salnikov	14	Ret	9	16	15	13	8	8	16	12	7	12			47
15	Daniil Gryaznov					13	Ret	Ret	10	13	3	10	11			39
16	Tatiana Eliseeva	Ret	Ret	Ret	15	7	2	Ret	11			WD	WD			36
17	Daniil Kovalev	11	8	11	13	14	11	14	Ret	14	17					32
18	Stanislav Kokorev									Ret	15	12	Ret	10	3	27
19	Oleg Kravtsov			12	12			10	12	18	11					23
20	Stepan Anufriev	DSQ	12	15	17											5
21	Ivan Stepanov									15	14					3
22	Azat Kalimullin											Ret	14†			2
Pos.	Driver	MSC1		IGO		NRG		KAZ1		MSC2		KAZ2		GRO		Pts.

Colour	Result
Gold	Winner
Silver	Second place
Bronze	Third place
Green	Points classification
Blue	Non-points classification
Blue	Non-classified finish (NC)
Purple	Retired, not classified (Ret)
Red	Did not qualify (DNQ)
Red	Did not pre-qualify (DNPQ)
Black	Disqualified (DSQ)
White	Did not start (DNS)
White	Withdrew (WD)
White	Race cancelled (C)
Blank	Did not practice (DNP)
Blank	Did not arrive (DNA)
Blank	Excluded (EX)

**Bold** – Pole
Italics – Fastest Lap

† – Drivers did not finish the race, but were classified as they completed over 75% of the race distance.

==== Touring Light Team's Standings ====
Pos.	Driver	MSC1		IGO		NRG		KAZ1		MSC2		KAZ2		GRO		Pts.
1	Bragin Racing Team	1	1	8	5	1	1	5	2	1	2	4	4	1	1	466
1	Bragin Racing Team	6	3	14	7	3	6	12	5	8	13	Ret	6	7	10	466
2	Kuzma's Mother Racing Team	3	2	4	8	2	4	6	1	2	6	3	3	3	4	418
2	Kuzma's Mother Racing Team	7	4	Ret	11	11	10	11	6	7	16	13	7	4	6	418
3	Powerfull	4	13	1	1	4	8	2	3	5	18	1	2	Ret	11	284
3	Powerfull	5	Ret	Ret	9	6	Ret	15	Ret	17	Ret	Ret	Ret			284
4	Innostage AG Team	8	6	2	6	10	12	7	9	3	5	8	9	8	2	247
4	Innostage AG Team	9	Ret	5	10	Ret	Ret	13	14	4	7	11	10	11	5	247
5	Lukoil Racing Team	2	5	6	13	5	7	4	13	12	9	2	5	6	Ret	191
5	Lukoil Racing Team	11	8	11	Ret	14	11	14	Ret	14	17					191
6	Rally Academy	13	7	7	4	9	3	1	12	11	4	Ret	1			164
6	Rally Academy			12	12			10	Ret	18	11					164
7	B-Tuning Pro Racing Team	15	9	10	14	7	2	9	7	9	10	6	13	9	8	128
7	B-Tuning Pro Racing Team	Ret	Ret	Ret	15	Ret	5	Ret	11			WD	WD			128
Pos.	Driver	MSC1		IGO		NRG		KAZ1		MSC2		KAZ2		GRO		Pts.

=== S1600 ===
Pos.	Driver	MSC1		IGO		NRG		KAZ1		MSC2		KAZ2		GRO		Pts.
1	Kay Richard Schick	6	1	8	1	**1**	2	1	7	3	1	1	2	4	5	318
2	Philipp Tuponosov	9	6	6	2	3	6	3	4	**1**	2	4	8	5	7	261
3	Aleksandr Pochenkov	**1**	2	1	5	7	1	5	2	4	5	6	3	Ret	2	257
4	Mikhail Pochenkov	3	3	3	7	Ret	3	**2**	3	5	6	9	1	1	1	254
5	Ruslan Safin	5	7	**2**	4	5	7	4	Ret	7	7	**2**	7	3	6	206
6	Vasily Korablev	2	5			4	4	8	1			3	5			152
7	Albert Zinatov	10	9	4	9	6	8	6	6	8	3					110
8	Vakhtang Dimitradze	8	8	5	6	2	5			9	8	8	9			108
9	Vladimir Sheshenin									2	4	Ret	Ret	**2**	3	91
10	Konstantin Shitov	11	10	7	3			7	9			7	4	Ret	4	90
11	Azat Kalimullin	4	4	9	8			10	5	6	DSQ					73
12	Kirill Antonov											5	6			26
13	Rifat Gallyamov							9	8							15
14	Daniil Gryaznov	7	Ret													10
Pos.	Driver	MSC1		IGO		NRG		KAZ1		MSC2		KAZ2		GRO		Pts.

Colour	Result
Gold	Winner
Silver	Second place
Bronze	Third place
Green	Points classification
Blue	Non-points classification
Blue	Non-classified finish (NC)
Purple	Retired, not classified (Ret)
Red	Did not qualify (DNQ)
Red	Did not pre-qualify (DNPQ)
Black	Disqualified (DSQ)
White	Did not start (DNS)
White	Withdrew (WD)
White	Race cancelled (C)
Blank	Did not practice (DNP)
Blank	Did not arrive (DNA)
Blank	Excluded (EX)

**Bold** – Pole
Italics – Fastest Lap

† – Drivers did not finish the race, but were classified as they completed over 75% of the race distance.

==== S1600 Team's Standings ====
Pos.	Driver	MSC1		IGO		NRG		KAZ1		MSC2		KAZ2		GRO		Pts.
1	Powerfull	1	2	1	5	7	1	2	2	4	5	6	1	1	1	511
1	Powerfull	3	3	3	7	Ret	3	5	3	5	6	9	3	Ret	2	511
2	GTE Racing Team	4	4	6	2	3	6	3	4	1	2	2	7	2	3	475
2	GTE Racing Team	9	6	9	8	6	8	10	5	2	4	4	8	5	7	475
3	GTE Racing Team Plus	5	7	2	3	5	7	4	9	7	3	5	4	3	4	306
3	GTE Racing Team Plus	11	10	7	4			7	Ret	8	7	7	6	Ret	6	306
Pos.	Driver	MSC1		IGO		NRG		KAZ1		MSC2		KAZ2		GRO		Pts.

=== SMP GT4 Russia ===
Pos.	Driver	MSC1			IGO			MSC2		KAZ			GRO			Pts.
1	Irina Sidorkova	1	2	5	**3**	4	2	**1**	**1**	**1**	4	2	Ret	2	4	263
2	Ivan Lukashevich	6	6	4	2	1	8			3	2	3	1	1	1	262
3	Stanislav Novikov	**2**	1	Ret	8	2	DSQ	Ret	2	4	3	1	**2**	3	3	233
4	Denis Remenyako	5	5	1	1	3	10	2	3	2	1	4	4	5	5	231
5	Dmitry Rodionov	7	4	3	4	10	6	4	4	5	Ret	6	3	4	2	167
6	Sergey Stolyarov	4	3	2	6	11	1									97
7	Andrey Goncharov	9	9	8	13	5	3	5	8	9	5	8				86
8	Ilya Sidorov	3	7	10	7	Ret	DNS	Ret	2	7	7	Ret				71
9	Nikita Silaev	8	11	9	5	9	Ret	3	5	8	6	7				70
10	Dmitry Anastasiadis				12	12†	5			6	Ret	5	Ret	6	6	64
11	Anton Nemkin	10	8	Ret	11	8	4			Ret	Ret	9	DNS	DNS	7	65
12	Viktor Titarenko	Ret	10	6	9	7	7	DNS	DNS							42
13	Roman Smolyakov	Ret	12	7	10	6	9	Ret	6							38
-	Aleksandr Smolyar							**1**	**1**							-
-	Aleksey Nesov							3	5							-
-	Sergey Borisov							4	4							-
-	Aleksandr Maslennikov							5	8							-
-	Petr Biryukov							Ret	7							-
-	Denis Pomogalov							Ret	7							-
-	Sergey Titarenko							DNS	DNS							-
Pos.	Driver	MSC1			IGO			MSC2		KAZ			GRO			Pts.

Colour	Result
Gold	Winner
Silver	Second place
Bronze	Third place
Green	Points classification
Blue	Non-points classification
Blue	Non-classified finish (NC)
Purple	Retired, not classified (Ret)
Red	Did not qualify (DNQ)
Red	Did not pre-qualify (DNPQ)
Black	Disqualified (DSQ)
White	Did not start (DNS)
White	Withdrew (WD)
White	Race cancelled (C)
Blank	Did not practice (DNP)
Blank	Did not arrive (DNA)
Blank	Excluded (EX)

**Bold** – Pole
Italics – Fastest Lap

† – Drivers did not finish the race, but were classified as they completed over 75% of the race distance.

==== SMP GT4 Russia Team's Standings ====
Pos.	Driver	MSC1			IGO			KAZ			GRO			Pts.
1	SMP Racing by Capital RT	1	2	1	1	3	2	1	1	2	4	2	4	494
1	SMP Racing by Capital RT	5	5	5	3	4	10	2	4	4	Ret	5	5	494
2	Motor Sharks	6	6	4	2	1	4	3	2	3	1	1	1	318
2	Motor Sharks	10	8	Ret	11	8	8	Ret	Ret	9	DNS	DNS	7	318
3	Team Garis	7	4	3	4	10	5	5	Ret	5	3	4	2	231
3	Team Garis				12	12	6	6	Ret	6	Ret	6	6	231
4	BMW Time 4 Race	9	9	7	10	5	3	9	5	8				124
4	BMW Time 4 Race	Ret	12	8	13	6	9							124
5	YADRO Motorsport	4	3	2	6	11	1							97
Pos.	Driver	MSC1			IGO			KAZ			GRO			Pts.
