= 2026 Russian Circuit Racing Series =

Motor racing season

The 2026 SMP Russian Circuit Racing Series was the thirteenth season of the Russian Circuit Racing Series, organized by SMP Racing. It was the twelfth season with international TCR class cars. In 2026, the competition was held in seven classes: Touring, Touring Light, Super Production, S1600, GT4, CN and monoclass RB03. This was also the second season that RCRS has hosted SMP Formula 4 races.

2026 SMP Russian Circuit Racing Series

== Teams and drivers ==
Yokohama was the official tyre supplier.

=== Touring / TCR Russian Touring Car Championship ===
Teams claimed for team points

Team	Car	No.	Drivers	Rounds
(Russia) SMP Racing	Cupra León VZ TCR	2	(Russia) Aleksandr Smolyar	All
(Russia) SMP Racing	Cupra León VZ TCR	10	(Russia) Vladimir Atoev	All
(Russia) Lukoil Racing Twins Team	Cupra León VZ TCR	3	(Russia) Artem Slutsky	All
(Russia) Lukoil Racing Twins Team	Cupra León VZ TCR	12	(Russia) Mikhail Simonov	1–4
(Russia) Lukoil Racing Twins Team	Cupra León VZ TCR	23	(Russia) Artem Severiukhin	5–7
(Russia) Lukoil Racing Twins Team	Hyundai Elantra N TCR	14	(Russia) Zakhar Slutsky	All
(Russia) TAIF Motorsport	Cupra León VZ TCR	4	(Russia) Dmitry Bragin	All
(Russia) TAIF Motorsport	Cupra León VZ TCR	25	(Russia) Maksim Soldatov	All
(Russia) LADA Sport Rosneft	LADA Vesta NG Sport TCR	12	(Russia) Mikhail Simonov	5–7
(Russia) LADA Sport Rosneft	LADA Vesta NG Sport TCR	23	(Russia) Artem Severiukhin	1–4
(Russia) LADA Sport Rosneft	LADA Vesta NG Sport TCR	55	(Russia) Ivan Chubarov	All
(Russia) Innostage AG Team	Cupra León VZ TCR	18	(Russia) Rustam Fatkhutdinov	1–2

=== Super Production ===
Teams claimed for team points

Team	Car	No.	Drivers	Rounds
(Russia) ITECO Racing Team	Subaru BRZ	16	(Russia) Azat Kalimullin	All
(Russia) ITECO Racing Team	Subaru BRZ	22	(Russia) Dmitry Lebedev	6
(Russia) ITECO Racing Team	Subaru BRZ	52	(Russia) Maksim Turiev	6
(Russia) ITECO Racing Team	Subaru BRZ	81	(Russia) Timofey Buyanov	All
(Russia) ITECO Racing Team	Subaru BRZ	91	(Russia) Ivan Ekelchik	2, 4
(Russia) ITECO Racing Team	LADA Granta Cup	67	(Russia) Samvel Iskoyants	5–6
(Russia) ITECO Racing Team	LADA Granta Cup	87	(Russia) Radik Basyrov	1–3
(Russia) NEVA Motorsport	Honda Civic Type R EP3	17	(Russia) Vladimir Cherevan	7
(Russia) NEVA Motorsport	Honda Civic Type R EP3	58	(Russia) Aleksey Mankovsky	4
(Russia) NEVA Motorsport	Honda Civic Type R FN2	50	(Russia) Roman Golykov	All
(Russia) Balashkhinsky DOSAAF	SEAT León Supercopa Mk2	44	(Russia) Sergey Gorbatenko	7
(Russia) Shield Rock MEPHI Racing Team	Volkswagen Scirocco	44	(Russia) Sergey Gorbatenko	4
(Russia) Shield Rock MEPHI Racing Team	Volkswagen Scirocco	49	(Russia) Eugeny Sheklachev	2
(Russia) Shield Rock MEPHI Racing Team	Volkswagen Scirocco	80	(Russia) Aleksandr Garmash	1–5, 7
(Russia) Shield Rock MEPHI Racing Team	Volkswagen Scirocco	90	(Russia) Pavel Pastushkov	1
(Russia) Mazda High Power	Mazda MX5	77	(Russia) Kirill Glushak	3, 5, 7

=== Touring Light ===
Teams claimed for team points

Team	Car	No.	Drivers	Rounds
(Russia) PSM Sport	Hyundai Solaris II 1.6T	7	(Russia) Aleksandr Salnikov	1–5, 7
(Russia) PSM Sport	Hyundai Solaris II 1.6T	77	(Russia) Daniil Gryaznov	1–4
(Russia) PSM Sport	Hyundai i20 1.6T	77	(Russia) Daniil Gryaznov	5, 7
(Russia) Innostage AG Team	Kia Rio X 1.5T	8	(Russia) Ruslan Zarifianov	1–5, 7
(Russia) Innostage AG Team	Audi A1 Sportback 6B 1.5T	24	(Russia) Kirill Zinoviev	All
(Russia) Innostage AG Team	Audi A1 Sportback 6B 1.5T	32	(Russia) Aleksandr Chachava	All
(Russia) GTE Racing Team Plus	Kia Rio X 1.5T	10	(Russia) Ruslan Safin	All
(Russia) GTE Racing Team Plus	Kia Rio X 1.5T	51	(Russia) Konstantin Shitov	1–2, 4–7
(Russia) GTE Racing Team Plus	Kia Rio X 1.5T	84	(Russia) Filipp Tuponosov	1, 4
(Russia) GTE Racing Team	Kia Rio X 1.4T	19	(Russia) Vladimir Sheshenin	All
(Russia) GTE Racing Team	Audi A1 8X 1.4T	43	(Russia) Andrey Maslennikov	All
(Russia) Bragin Racing Team	Skoda Fabia 1.5T	11	(Russia) Arseny Malyghin	1, 4–7
(Russia) Bragin Racing Team	Skoda Fabia 1.5T	34	(Russia) Ivan Zhuravlev	All
(Russia) Bragin Racing Team	Skoda Fabia 1.5T	66	(Belarus) Aleksey Savin	All
(Russia) Kuzma’s Mother Racing Team	Kia Rio X 1.6T	12	(Russia) Nikolay Karamyshev	All
(Russia) Kuzma’s Mother Racing Team	Kia Rio X 1.6T	33	(Russia) Dmitry Dudarev	All
(Russia) Kuzma’s Mother Racing Team	Kia Rio X 1.6T	50	(Russia) Roman Golykov	All
(Russia) Kuzma’s Mother Racing Team	Kia Pro Cee'd GT	20	(Russia) Egor Sanin	7
(Russia) Russian Racing Group	Mini JCW F56 1.6T	13	(Russia) Stepan Anufriev	1–5, 7
(Russia) B-Tuning Pro Racing Team	Audi A1 8X 1.4T	15	(Russia) Ivan Bozhedomov	All
(Russia) Kovalev Daniil	Audi A1 8X 1.4T	21	(Russia) Daniil Kovalev	1–5, 7
(Russia) ALGA Motorsport	Kia Rio X 1.5T	23	(Germany) Kai Richard Schick	All
(Russia) SHONX	Mini JCW F56 1.6T	28	(Russia) Rodion Shushakov	2, 4
(Russia) SHONX	Mini JCW F56 1.6T	29	(Russia) Andrey Petukhov	1–4, 7
(Russia) Powerfuls	Kia Rio X 1.5T	37	(Russia) Denis Karelin	1–4, 7
(Russia) Powerfuls	Volkswagwn Polo 1.4T	44	(Russia) Samvel Iskoyants	All
(Russia) Rally Academy	Volkswagwn Polo VI 1.4T	49	(Russia) Ivan Tverdokhlebov	1–3
(Russia) Rally Academy	Volkswagwn Polo VI 1.4T	55	(Russia) Petr Plotnikov	All
(Russia) Rally Academy	Volkswagwn Polo VI 1.4T	65	(Russia) Kirill Dzitiev	All
(Russia) Kokorev Racing Team	Kia Rio X 1.6T	99	(Russia) Stanislav Kokorev	1–4, 6–7

=== S1600 ===
Teams claimed for team points

Team	Car	No.	Drivers	Rounds
(Russia) Bragin Racing Team	Lada Granta	5	(Russia) Maksim Aksenov	7
(Russia) Bragin Racing Team	Lada Granta	14	(Russia) Ivan Chekhov	7
(Russia) Bragin Racing Team	Lada Granta	17	(Russia) Arseny Malyghin	2–3
(Russia) Ratata Racing	Lada Granta	53	(Russia) Stanislav Asafiev	3, 5, 7
(Russia) GS Racing Team	Lada Kalina	27	(Russia) Gerasim Skulanov	1–2, 7
(Russia) Racing Syndicate	Lada Granta	31	(Russia) Vladimir Kruchkov	5
(Russia) Krupnov Dmitry	Lada Granta	36	(Russia) Dmitry Krupnov	2
(Russia) ITECO Racing Team	Lada Kalina	47	(Russia) Anton Tonkov	3
(Russia) ITECO Racing Team	Lada Kalina	81	(Russia) Timofey Buyanov	1
(Russia) ITECO Racing Team	Lada Kalina	85	(Russia) Mikhail Dralin	1–3, 5, 7
(Russia) ITECO Racing Team	Lada Kalina	87	(Russia) Radik Basyrov	1
(Russia) Parus	Lada Granta	56	(Russia) Vasiliy Korablev	2
(Russia) Orlov Nikita	Lada Granta	58	(Russia) Nikita Orlov	1–2, 5, 7
(Russia) Pereshivalov Bogdan	Lada Granta	63	(Russia) Bogdan Pereshivalov	2
(Russia) Rodkin Ilya	Lada Granta	70	(Russia) Ilya Rodkin	1–3, 5, 7
(Russia) GTE Racing Team	Lada Granta	84	(Russia) Philipp Tuponosov	7
(Russia) Volkov Alexey	Lada Kalina	98	(Russia) Aleksey Volkov	3, 5

=== GT4 ===
Team	Car	No.	Drivers	Class	Rounds
(Russia) Motor Sharks	Mercedes-AMG GT4	1	(Russia) Ivan Lukashevich (Russia) Anton Nemkin	PA	All (6); All
(Russia) X Motorsport	Toyota GR Supra GT4 Evo 2	5	(Russia) Sergey Titarenko (Russia) Viktor Titarenko	PA	All; All
(Russia) Sportcar Racing Team	Porsche 718 Cayman GT4 Clubsport	7	(Russia) Kirill Smal	P	1
(Russia) Sportcar Racing Team	Mercedes-AMG GT4	50	(Russia) Ivan Scherbakov (Russia) Vitaly Larionov	PA	All; All
(Russia) RScar Motorsport	Porsche 718 Cayman GT4 Clubsport	8	(Russia) Maksim Vinogradov	Am	7
(Russia) RScar Motorsport	Mercedes-AMG GT4	24	(Russia) Nikita Silaev (Russia) Alexey Nesov (Russia) Zakhar Slutsky	PA	All; 1–2, 4–5, 7; 6
(Russia) RScar Motorsport	Mercedes-AMG GT4	63	(Russia) Vadim Mescheryakov	Am	All
(Russia) TEAMGARIS	Toyota GR Supra GT4 Evo 2	11	(Russia) Dmitry Rodionov (Russia) Sergey Borisov	PA	All; All
(Russia) TEAMGARIS	Toyota GR Supra GT4 Evo 2	34	(Russia) Eduard Islamov (Russia) Stanislav Aksenov	PA	1–2, 4–5; 1–2, 4–5
(Russia) TEAMGARIS	Toyota GR Supra GT4	56	(Russia) Dmitry Anastasiadis	Am	4
(Russia) TEAMGARIS	Toyota GR Supra GT4 Evo	31	(Russia) Aleksandr Vinopal	Am	1
(Russia) ITECO Racing Team x TEAMGARIS	Toyota GR Supra GT4 Evo	52	(Russia) Maksim Turiev (Russia) Sergey Grishanov	PA	1–2, 4–5, 7; 1–2, 4–5, 7
(Russia) Shishkoil by CapitalRT	Mercedes-AMG GT4	12	(Russia) Petr Plotnikov (Russia) Dmitry Shishko	PA; Am	1–2, 4–6; All
(Russia) CapitalRT	Mercedes-AMG GT4	13	(Russia) Mikhail Aleshin (Russia) Denis Remenyako	PA	1–2, 4, 7; 1–2, 4, 7
(Russia) SMP Racing x Putin Team (Note: This name is associated with the Putin Team clothing brand and is not related to politics.)	Mercedes-AMG GT4	51	(Russia) Irina Sidorkova (Russia) Dmitry Gvazava	PA	All; All
(Russia) YADRO Motorsport	Aston Martin Vantage AMR GT4	16	(Russia) Ivan Chubarov (Russia) Viktor Shaytar	P	1, 7; 1, 7
(Russia) YADRO Motorsport	BMW G82 M4 GT4	16	(Russia) Ivan Chubarov (Russia) Viktor Shaytar	P	2, 4; 2, 4
(Russia) YADRO Motorsport	Mercedes-AMG GT4	48	(Russia) Sergey Stolyarov	Am	7
(Russia) YADRO Motorsport	Mercedes-AMG GT4	88	(Russia) Rinat Salikhov	Am	7
(Russia) Twins Racing by YADRO Motorsport	Mercedes-AMG GT4	33	(Russia) Zakhar Slutsky (Russia) Artem Slutsky	P	4; 4
(Russia) Rumos Racing	Toyota GR Supra GT4 Evo 2	18	(Russia) Stanislav Novikov (Russia) Ilya Sidorov	Am	All; All
(Russia) Fire n` Smoke Racing	Toyota GR Supra GT4 Evo 2	20	(Russia) Ivan Ekelchik (Russia) Maksim Shaposhnikov	PA	2, 4; 2, 4
(Russia) Fire n` Smoke Racing	Toyota GR Supra GT4 Evo 2	27	(Russia) Artemiy Melnikov (Russia) Roman Scherbakov	P	1; 1
(Russia) Time4Race	BMW M4 GT4	55	(Russia) Roman Smolyakov	Am	1
(Russia) Time4Race	Toyota GR Supra GT4 Evo	55	(Russia) Roman Smolyakov (Russia) Andrey Goncharov	Am	4, 7; 4, 7
(Russia) Time4Race	Toyota GR Supra GT4 Evo	77	(Russia) Andrey Goncharov	Am	1
(Russia) VRacing Team	Audi R8 LMS GT4	90	(Russia) Kirill Smal (Russia) Aleksandr Vartanyan	P	4; 4

Icon	Class
P	Pro Cup
PA	Pro/Am Cup
Am	Am Cup
	Teams claimed for team points

=== Sports prototype CN ===
Teams claimed for team points

Team	Car	No.	Drivers	Rounds

=== BR03 ===
Team	Car	No.	Drivers	Rounds

== Calendar and results ==
Calendar is presented on 25 November 2025 and includes 11 weekends and up to 7 rounds in different classes. The calendar was slightly changed on 6 April 2026. Not all classes will be represented in every round.

Rnd.	Circuit	Date	Touring winner	SP winner	TL winner	S1600 winner	GT4 winner	CN winners	Mazda Cup winners	S1600 Junior winners
1	Moscow Raceway, Volokolamsk	16–17 May	R1: Maksim Soldatov; R2: Zakhar Slutsky	R1: Timofey Buyanov; R2: Roman Golykov	R1: Andrey Maslennikov; R2: Samvel Iskoyants	R1: Ilya Rodkin; R2: Ilya Rodkin	R1: Vadim Mescheryakov; R2: Vadim Mescheryakov	R1: Shortcut: Andrey Gromov; Legends EVO: Artem Kabakov; Mitjet: Denis Pomogalov; Legends 600: Artem Maksimchuk; R2: Shortcut: Igor Shunailov; Legends EVO: Artem Kabakov; Mitjet: Denis Pomogalov; Legends 600: Artem Maksimchuk	not held	not held
2	Kazan Ring, Kazan	13–14 June	R1: Vladimir Atoev; R2: Maksim Soldatov	R1: Roman Golykov; R2: Roman Golykov	R1: Nikolay Karamyshev; R2: Petr Plotnikov	R1: Vasily Korablev; R2: Ilya Rodkin	R1: Ivan Chubarov and Viktor Shaytar; R2: Dmitry Rodionov and Sergey Borisov	not held	not held	not held
3	NRING Circuit, Bogorodsk	4–5 July	R1: Ivan Chubarov; R2: Maksim Soldatov	R1: Timofey Buyanov; R2: Timofey Buyanov	R1: Petr Plotnikov; R2: Petr Plotnikov	R1: Mikhail Dralin; R2: Arseny Malyghin	not held	R1: Shortcut: Andrey Gromov; Legends EVO: Vyacheslav Kiselev; Mitjet: Petr Biryukov; Legends 600: Danila Chernega; R2: Shortcut: Andrey Gromov; Legends EVO: no finishers Mitjet: Denis Pomogalov; Legends 600: Danila Chernega	R1:Valery Smirnov; R2: Kirill Glushak	R1:Maksim Aksenov; R2: Amir Sabirov
4	Igora Drive, Priozersk	8–9 August	R1: Aleksandr Smolyar; R2: Zakhar Slutsky	R1: Azat Kalimullin; R2: Timofey Buyanov	R1: Kai Richard Schick; R2: Ivan Zhuravlev	no participants	R1: Zakhar Slutsky and Artem Slutsky; R2: Zakhar Slutsky and Artem Slutsky	R1: Shortcut: Georgy Ogulenko; Legends EVO: Vyacheslav Kiselev; Mitjet: Denis Pomogalov; Legends 600: Artem Maksimchuk; R2: Shortcut: Georgy Ogulenko; Legends EVO: Vyacheslav Kiselev; Mitjet: Daan Arrow; Legends 600: Vladimir Gorlach	R: Kirill Glushak	R1: Emir Gallyamov; R2: Maksim Aksenov
5	NRING Circuit, Bogorodsk	29–30 August	R1: Ivan Chubarov; R2: Artem Slutsky	R1: Timofey Buyanov; R2: Kirill Glushak	R1: Petr Plotnikov; R2: Samvel Iskoyants	R1: Ilya Rodkin; R2: Stanislav Asafiev	R1: Irina Sidorkova and Dmitry Gvazava; R2: Vadim Mescheryakov	not held	not held	not held
6	Fort Grozny Autodrom, Grozny	11–13 September	R1: Maksim Soldatov; R2: Mikhail Simonov	R1: Timofey Buyanov; R2: Azat Kalimullin	R1: Nikolay Karamyshev; R2: Andrey Maslennikov	no participants	R1: Ilya Sidorov and Stanislav Novikov; R2: Dmitry Rodionov and Sergey Borisov	not held	not held	not held
7	Moscow Raceway, Volokolamsk	9–11 October	R1: Aleksandr Smolyar; R2: Aleksandr Smolyar	R1: Timofey Buyanov; R2: Sergey Gorbatenko	R1: Daniil Gryaznov; R2: Kai Richard Schick	R1: Maksim Aksenov; R2: Ilya Rodkin	R1: Dmitry Rodionov and Sergey Borisov; R2: Ivan Chubarov and Viktor Shaytar	R1: Shortcut: Legends EVO: Mitjet: Legends 600: R2: Shortcut: Legends EVO: Mitjet: Legends 600: R3: Shortcut: Legends EVO: Mitjet: Legends 600: R4: Shortcut: Legends EVO: Mitjet: Legends 600:	not held	not held

== Championship standings ==
Scoring systems

Position	1st	2nd	3rd	4th	5th	6th	7th	8th	9th	10th	11th	12th	13th	14th	15th	FL
Qualification	6	5	4	3	2	1										
Race 1 Points	30	23	19	16	14	12	10	8	7	6	5	4	3	2	1	1
Race 2 Points	25	20	16	13	11	10	9	8	7	6	5	4	3	2	1	1

=== Touring / TCR Russian Touring Car Championship ===
Pos.	Driver	MSC1		KAZ		NRG1		IGO		NRG2		GRO		MSC2		Pts.
1	Aleksandr Smolyar	**2**	7	**2**	8	7	6	**1**	3	3	4	**5**	4	1	1	281
2	Maksim Soldatov	1	5	4	1	3	1	7	4	4	6	1	2	3	3	277
3	Ivan Chubarov	DNS	8	7	3	**1**	4	3	2	**1**	8	Ret	5	**2**	Ret	221
4	Zakhar Slutsky	5	1	9	4	2	Ret	4	1	6	2	3	3	Ret	6	207
5	Mikhail Simonov	Ret	2	6	6	8	3	2	6	2	9	6	1	4	7	205
6	Artem Slutsky	7	6	3	2	9	2	9	5	7	1	7	6	7	2	194
7	Vladimir Atoev	6	9	1	7	6	7	5	8	5	5	2	Ret	5	8	188
8	Dmitry Bragin	3	4	8	5	4	5	8	7	8	7	4	7	6	5	163
9	Artem Severiukhin	8	10	5	Ret	5	8	6	9	9	3	8	8	8	4	140
10	Rustam Fatkhutdinov	4	3	WD	WD											34
Pos.	Driver	MSC1		KAZ		NRG1		IGO		NRG2		GRO		MSC2		Pts.

Colour	Result
Gold	Winner
Silver	Second place
Bronze	Third place
Green	Points classification
Blue	Non-points classification
Blue	Non-classified finish (NC)
Purple	Retired, not classified (Ret)
Red	Did not qualify (DNQ)
Red	Did not pre-qualify (DNPQ)
Black	Disqualified (DSQ)
White	Did not start (DNS)
White	Withdrew (WD)
White	Race cancelled (C)
Blank	Did not practice (DNP)
Blank	Did not arrive (DNA)
Blank	Excluded (EX)

**Bold** – Pole
Italics – Fastest Lap

† – Drivers did not finish the race, but were classified as they completed over 75% of the race distance.

==== Touring / TCR Russian Touring Car Championship Team's Standings ====
Pos.	Driver	MSC1		KAZ		NRG1		IGO		NRG2		GRO		MSC2	Pts.
1	SMP Racing	2	7	1	7	6	6	1	3	3	4	2	4		387
1	SMP Racing	6	9	2	8	7	7	5	8	5	5	5	Ret		387
2	TAIF Motorsprot	1	4	4	1	3	1	7	4	4	6	1	2		378
2	TAIF Motorsprot	3	5	8	5	4	5	8	7	8	7	4	7		378
3	LADA Sport Rosneft	8	8	5	3	1	4	3	2	1	8	6	1		342
3	LADA Sport Rosneft	DNS	10	7	Ret	5	8	6	9	2	9	Ret	5		342
4	Lukoil Racing Twins Team	7	2	3	2	8	2	4	1	6	1	3	3		339
4	Lukoil Racing Twins Team	Ret	6	6	6	9	3	9	5	7	2	7	6		339
Pos.	Driver	MSC1		KAZ		NRG1		IGO		NRG2		GRO		MSC2	Pts.

=== Super Production ===
Pos.	Driver	MSC1		KAZ		NRG1		IGO		NRG2		GRO		MSC2		Pts.
1	Timofey Buyanov	1	2	2	2	1	1	Ret	1	1	2	1	Ret	1	Ret	311
2	Roman Golykov	**2**	1	**1**	1	**2**	2	4	2	**2**	4	**Ret**	Ret	**Ret**	Ret	259
3	Azat Kalimullin	3	4	3	5	Ret	4	1	4	4	Ret	3	1	3	3	233
4	Aleksandr Garmash	DNS	3	DNS	6	Ret	3	3	3	5	Ret			4	5	136
5	Kirill Glushak					3	5			3	1			6	4	104
6	Ivan Ekelchik			4	3			**2**	4							71
7	Sergey Gorbatenko							Ret	7					2	1	62
8	Samvel Iskoyants									6	3	Ret	2			54
9	Radik Basyrov	5	5	6	Ret	Ret	Ret									43
10	Vladimir Cherevan													5	2	36
11	Dmitry Lebedev											4	3			34
12	Eugeny Sheklachev			5	4											28
13	Pavel Pastushkov	4	6													27
14	Maksim Turiev											2	Ret			26
15	Aleksey Mankovsky							DNS	5							11
Pos.	Driver	MSC1		KAZ		NRG1		IGO		NRG2		GRO		MSC2		Pts.

Colour	Result
Gold	Winner
Silver	Second place
Bronze	Third place
Green	Points classification
Blue	Non-points classification
Blue	Non-classified finish (NC)
Purple	Retired, not classified (Ret)
Red	Did not qualify (DNQ)
Red	Did not pre-qualify (DNPQ)
Black	Disqualified (DSQ)
White	Did not start (DNS)
White	Withdrew (WD)
White	Race cancelled (C)
Blank	Did not practice (DNP)
Blank	Did not arrive (DNA)
Blank	Excluded (EX)

**Bold** – Pole
Italics – Fastest Lap

† – Drivers did not finish the race, but were classified as they completed over 75% of the race distance.

==== Super Production Team's Standings ====
Pos.	Driver	MSC1		KAZ		NRG1		IGO		NRG2		GRO		MSC2	Pts.
1	ITECO Racing Team	1	2	3	5	1	1	1	1	1	2	1	1		478
1	ITECO Racing Team	3	4	6	Ret	Ret	4	Ret	4	4	Ret	3	Ret		478
Pos.	Driver	MSC1		KAZ		NRG1		IGO		NRG2		GRO		MSC2	Pts.

=== Touring Light ===
Pos.	Driver	MSC1		KAZ		NRG1		IGO		NRG2		GRO		MSC2	Pts.
1	Nikolay Karamyshev	**20**	3	**1**	10	5	2	8	7	2	14	1	5		191
2	Andrey Maslennikov	1	7	10	7	2	3	6	4	6	15	4	1		186
3	Petr Plotnikov	21	9	5	1	1	1	13	13	**1**	9	3	13		181
4	Kirill Zinoviev	5	5	13	11	3	6	5	2	9	6	6	4		145
5	Samvel Iskoyans	Ret	1	6	2	13	14	2	Ret	8	1	10	7		138
6	Kai Richard Schick	3	6	8	Ret	7	21	1	5	7	7	Ret	2		136
7	Kirill Dzitiev	6	Ret	4	4	4	22	23	10	10	2	8	6		109
8	Roman Golykov	Ret	4	25†	14	6	Ret	10	9	4	Ret	2	3		105
9	Aleksey Savin	4	21	7	5	10	4	3	19	20	3	15	Ret		95
10	Vladimir Sheshenin	Ret	2	3	Ret	Ret	5	9	6	Ret	5	**Ret**	15		90
11	Dmitry Dudarev	12	12	9	6	17	10	18	12	3	8	13	9		80
12	Arseny Malyghin	19	23					**4**	3	5	4	14	8		78
13	Ivan Zhuravlev	23	13	15	16	Ret	17	7	1	14	11	5	14		61
14	Stanislav Kokorev	Ret	Ret	2	Ret	20	20	14	15			7	11		49
15	Ivan Bozhedomov	10	17	21	3	8	8	16	21	17	16	12	12		46
16	Andrey Petukhov	7	8	24	9	Ret	7	11	Ret						39
17	Aleksandr Chachava	22	16	20	8	11	Ret	15	11	18	13	9	10		38
18	Denis Karelin	2	22	22	Ret	19	11	17	16						32
19	Daniil Gryaznov	9	Ret	17	20†	16	9	12	8	19	20				26
20	Ivan Tverdokhlebov	8	11	12	19	9	18								26
21	Ruslan Safin	11	14	11	Ret	12	13	20	23	12	Ret	Ret	Ret		23
22	Stepan Anufriev	14	15	14	12	14	16	24	20	11	10				22
23	Ruslan Zarifianov	16	20	18	13	15	12	Ret	17	13	12				15
24	Philipp Tuponosov	13	10					Ret	14						11
25	Konstantin Shitov	18	19	Ret	17			22	Ret	15	19	11	DNS		6
26	Daniil Kovalev	15	Ret	19	15	21	15	25	18	Ret	18				3
27	Aleksandr Salnikov	17	18	16	DSQ	18	19	19	Ret	16	17				0
28	Rodion Shushakov			23	18			21	22						0
Pos.	Driver	MSC1		KAZ		NRG1		IGO		NRG2		GRO		MSC2	Pts.

Colour	Result
Gold	Winner
Silver	Second place
Bronze	Third place
Green	Points classification
Blue	Non-points classification
Blue	Non-classified finish (NC)
Purple	Retired, not classified (Ret)
Red	Did not qualify (DNQ)
Red	Did not pre-qualify (DNPQ)
Black	Disqualified (DSQ)
White	Did not start (DNS)
White	Withdrew (WD)
White	Race cancelled (C)
Blank	Did not practice (DNP)
Blank	Did not arrive (DNA)
Blank	Excluded (EX)

**Bold** – Pole
Italics – Fastest Lap

† – Drivers did not finish the race, but were classified as they completed over 75% of the race distance.

==== Touring Light Team's Standings ====
Pos.	Driver	MSC1		KAZ		NRG1		IGO		NRG2		GRO		MSC2	Pts.
1	Kuzma’s Mother Racing Team	20	3	1	6	5	2	8	7	2	8	1	3		319
1	Kuzma’s Mother Racing Team	Ret	4	9	10	17	10	10	9	3	14	2	5		319
2	Rally Academy	8	9	4	1	1	1	13	10	1	2	3	6		291
2	Rally Academy	21	11	5	4	4	22	23	13	10	9	8	13		291
3	GTE Racing Team	1	2	3	7	2	3	6	4	6	5	4	1		276
3	GTE Racing Team	Ret	7	10	Ret	Ret	5	9	6	Ret	15	Ret	15		276
4	Innostage AG Team	5	5	13	8	3	6	5	2	9	6	6	4		183
4	Innostage AG Team	22	16	20	11	11	Ret	15	11	18	13	9	10		183
5	Powerfuls	2	1	6	2	13	11	2	16	8	1	10	7		170
5	Powerfuls	Ret	22	22	Ret	19	14	17	Ret						170
6	Bragin Racing Team	4	13	7	5	10	4	3	1	14	3	5	14		157
6	Bragin Racing Team	23	21	15	16	Ret	17	7	19	20	11	15	Ret		157
7	GTE Racing Team Plus	11	14	11	17	12	13	20	22	12	19	11	Ret		29
7	GTE Racing Team Plus	18	19	Ret	Ret			21	23	15	Ret	Ret	DNS		29
8	PSM Team	9	18	16	20†	16	9	12	8	16	17				26
8	PSM Team	17	Ret	17	DSQ	18	19	19	Ret	19	20				26
Pos.	Driver	MSC1		KAZ		NRG1		IGO		NRG2		GRO		MSC2	Pts.

=== S1600 ===
Pos.	Driver	MSC1		KAZ		NRG1		IGO	NRG2		GRO	MSC2		Pts.
1	Ilya Rodkin	**1**	1	2	1	2	2		1	2		3	1	266
2	Mikhail Dralin	4	3	8	6	**1**	Ret		**4**	3		4	4	158
3	Nikita Orlov	2	2	5	3				5	4		8	3	135
4	Stanislav Asafiev					3	3		3	1		6	5	110
5	Gerasim Skulanov	3	4	3	DSQ							7	Ret	73
6	Arseny Malyghin			4	7	Ret	1							57
7	Vasiliy Korablev			1	2									56
8	Aleksey Volkov					4	Ret		2	5				55
9	Philipp Tuponosov											**2**	2	49
10	Maksim Aksenov											1	6	40
11	Anton Tonkov					5	4							28
12	Bogdan Pereshivalov			6	4									26
13	Dmitry Krupnov			7	5									21
14	Ivan Chekhov											5	Ret	15
15	Vladimir Kruchkov								DNS	6				11
16	Timofey Buyanov	Ret	DNS											2
-	Radik Basyrov	DSQ	Ret											-
Pos.	Driver	MSC1		KAZ		NRG1		IGO	NRG2		GRO	MSC2		Pts.

Colour	Result
Gold	Winner
Silver	Second place
Bronze	Third place
Green	Points classification
Blue	Non-points classification
Blue	Non-classified finish (NC)
Purple	Retired, not classified (Ret)
Red	Did not qualify (DNQ)
Red	Did not pre-qualify (DNPQ)
Black	Disqualified (DSQ)
White	Did not start (DNS)
White	Withdrew (WD)
White	Race cancelled (C)
Blank	Did not practice (DNP)
Blank	Did not arrive (DNA)
Blank	Excluded (EX)

**Bold** – Pole
Italics – Fastest Lap

† – Drivers did not finish the race, but were classified as they completed over 75% of the race distance.

=== SMP GT4 Russia ===
Scoring systems

Position	1st	2nd	3rd	4th	5th	6th	7th	8th	9th	10th	PP	FL
Race 1 and 2 Points	25	18	15	12	10	8	6	4	2	1	**1**	0

Pos.	Driver	MSC1		KAZ		IGO		NRG		GRO		MSC2	Pts.
**Pro-Am** / **Am**
1	Vadim Mescheryakov	1	1	3	9	6	7	3	**1**	4	4		160
2	Maksim Turiev; Sergey Grishanov	2	6	**2**	5	**3**	4	**2**	8	Ret	Ret		138
3	Dmitry Rodionov; Sergey Borisov	Ret	5	Ret	**1**	4	5	6	3	7	**1**		132
4	Dmitry Gvazava; Irina Sidorkova	8	9	4	11	8	6	1	5	2	3		115
5	Ilya Sidorov; Stanislav Novikov	5	**7**	5	4	Ret	**Ret**	7	2	1	2		110
6	Nikita Silaev	6	3	8	3	Ret	14	4	4	8	5		82
7	Victor Titarenko; Sergey Titarenko	**14**	10	6	6	7	11	5	7	**3**	6		75
8	Alexey Nesov	6	3	8	3	Ret	14	4	4				68
9	Anton Nemkin; Ivan Lukashevich	3	NC	Ret	2	12	15	WD	WD	5	8		48
10	Denis Remenyako; Mikhail Aleshin	7	2	7	Ret	5	16						48
11	Eduard Islamov; Stanislav Aksenov	4	8	10	Ret	Ret	8	8	6				42
12	Ivan Scherbakov; Vitaly Larionov	12	12	11	8	11	9	10	9	6	Ret		28
13	Petr Plotnikov; Dmitry Shishko	10	Ret	9	10	13	12	9	10	9	7		23
14	Zakhar Slutsky									8	5		14
15	Roman Smolyakov	Ret	11			9	10						13
16	Andrey Goncharov	13	Ret			9	10						12
17	Dmitry Anastasiadis					10	13						5
18	Aleksandr Vinopal	11	Ret										1
19	Ivan Ekelchik; Maksim Shaposhnikov			DSQ	12	15	Ret						0
**Am**
1	Vadim Mescheryakov	1	1	3	**9**	**6**	7	**3**	**1**	4	4		234
2	Ilya Sidorov; Stanislav Novikov	**5**	**7**	**5**	4	Ret	**Ret**	7	2	**1**	**2**		169
3	Roman Smolyakov	Ret	11			9	10						51
4	Andrey Goncharov	13	Ret			9	10						48
5	Dmitry Anastasiadis					10	13						30
6	Aleksandr Vinopal	11	Ret										15
**Pro**
1	Ivan Chubarov; Viktor Shaytar	**9**	**4**	**1**	**7**	2	2						140
2	Zakhar Slutsky; Artem Slutsky					**1**	**1**						52
3	Roman Scherbakov; Artemiy Melnikov	15	13										36
4	Kirill Smal	DNQ	DNQ			14	3						30
4	Aleksandr Vartanyan					14	3						30
Pos.	Driver	MSC1		KAZ		IGO		NRG		GRO		MSC2	Pts.

Colour	Result
Gold	Winner
Silver	Second place
Bronze	Third place
Green	Points classification
Blue	Non-points classification
Blue	Non-classified finish (NC)
Purple	Retired, not classified (Ret)
Red	Did not qualify (DNQ)
Red	Did not pre-qualify (DNPQ)
Black	Disqualified (DSQ)
White	Did not start (DNS)
White	Withdrew (WD)
White	Race cancelled (C)
Blank	Did not practice (DNP)
Blank	Did not arrive (DNA)
Blank	Excluded (EX)

**Bold** – Pole
Italics – Fastest Lap

† – Drivers did not finish the race, but were classified as they completed over 75% of the race distance.

==== SMP GT4 Russia Team's Standings ====
Pos.	Driver	MSC1		KAZ		IGO		NRG		GRO		MSC2	Pts.
**Pro-Am** / **Am**
1	RScar Motorsport #63	1	1	3	9	6	7	3	**1**	4	4		160
2	ITECO Racing x TEAMGARIS #52	2	6	**2**	5	**3**	4	**2**	8	Ret	Ret		138
3	TEAMGARIS #11	Ret	5	Ret	**1**	4	5	6	3	7	**1**		129
4	SMP Racing x Putin Team #51	8	9	4	11	8	6	1	5	2	3		115
5	RUMOS Racing #18	5	**7**	5	4	Ret	**Ret**	7	2	1	2		110
6	RScar Motorsport #24	6	3	8	3	Ret	14	4	4	8	5		82
7	X-Motorsport #5	**14**	10	6	6	7	11	5	7	**3**	6		75
8	Motor Sharks #1	3	NC	Ret	2	12	15	WD	WD	5	8		48
9	CapitalRT #13	7	2	7	Ret	5	16						48
10	TEAMGARIS #34	4	8	10	Ret	Ret	8	8	6				42
11	Sportcar Racing Team #50	12	12	11	8	11	9	10	9	6	Ret		28
12	Shishkoil by CapitalRT #12	10	Ret	9	10	13	12	9	10	9	7		21
13	Time4Race #55	Ret	11			9	10						13
14	TEAMGARIS #56					10	13						5
15	TEAMGARIS #31	11	Ret										1
16	Fire n' Smoke #20			DSQ	12	15	Ret						0
17	Time4Race #77	13	Ret										0
**Am**
1	RScar Motorsport #63	1	1	3	**9**	**6**	7	**3**	**1**	4	4		234
2	RUMOS Racing #18	**5**	**7**	**5**	4	Ret	**Ret**	7	2	**1**	**2**		169
3	Time4Race #55	Ret	11			9	10						51
4	TEAMGARIS #56					10	13						30
5	TEAMGARIS #31	11	Ret										15
6	Time4Race #77	13	Ret										12
**Pro**
1	YADRO Motorsport #16	**9**	**4**	**1**	**7**	2	2						140
2	Twins Raacing by YADRO Motorsport #33					**1**	**1**						52
3	Fire n' Smoke #27	15	13										36
4	VRacing Team #90					14	3						30
-	Sportcar Racing Team #7	DNQ	DNQ										-
Pos.	Driver	MSC1		KAZ		IGO		NRG		GRO		MSC2	Pts.
