= Artem Severiukhin =

Russian racing driver (born 2006)

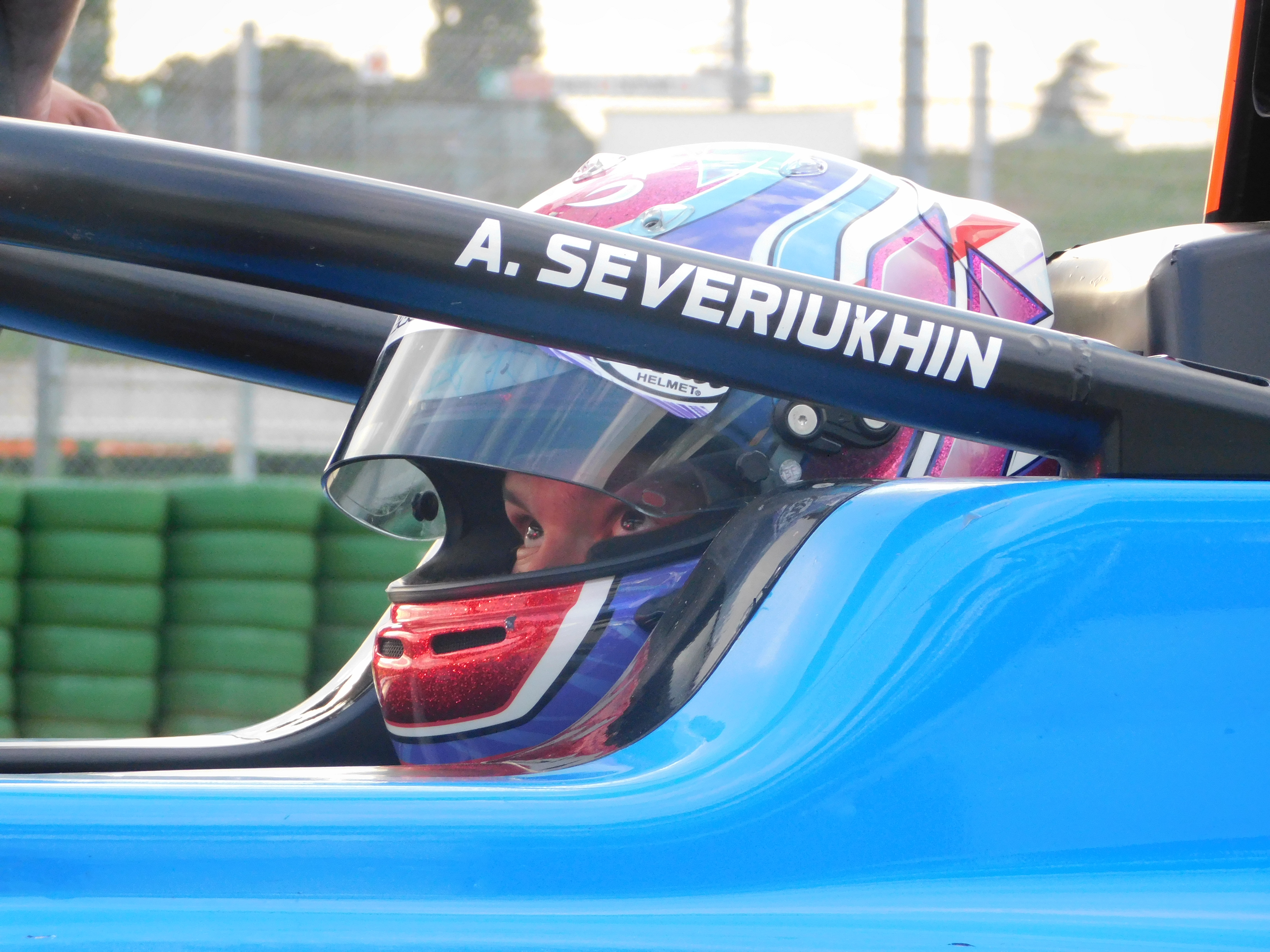
- Severiukhin in 2025
- Nationality: (Russia) Russian
- Born: 24 October 2006 (age 20) Verkhnyaya Pyshma, Russia

Italian F4 Championship career
- Debut season: 2025
- Current team: Jenzer Motorsport
- Car number: 23
- Starts: 23
- Wins: 0
- Podiums: 0
- Poles: 0
- Fastest laps: 0
- Best finish: 13th in 2025

Previous series
- 2026 2025 2025 2025: FR Middle East; SMP F4; F4 Spanish; Formula Winter Series

Artem Andreevich Severiukhin (Russian: Артём Андреевич Северюхин; born 24 October 2006) is a Russian racing driver who last competed in the TCR Russian Touring Car Championship for Lukoil Racing Twins Team.

He is the 2025 SMP F4 runner-up.

== Career ==
=== Karting (2013–2024) ===
Severiukhin began karting in 2013, competing in mini karts until 2018. Moving to junior karts in 2019, Severiukhin won the Russian title, finished second in the WSK Super Master Series and WSK Open Cup, as well as third in the Trofeo Delle Industrie. Continuing in the category for 2020, Severiukhin took his second Russian title and finished fourth in the WSK Champions Cup.

Stepping up to senior karts in 2021, Severiukhin most notably finished second to Kean Nakamura-Berta at the South Garda Winter Cup. Remaining in the category for 2022, Severiukhin won the Karting European Championship round at Portimao, but after performing a Nazi salute on the podium, he was disqualified and had his racing licence revoked. Returning to karting a year later, Severiukhin spent two seasons in KZ2, most notably finishing fourth in the 2024 Karting World Cup for Birel ART Racing.

=== Formula 4 and TCR debut (2025) ===
In 2025, Severiukhin made his single-seater debut, racing for Jenzer Motorsport in the Formula Winter Series and the Italian F4 Championship. In the former, Severiukhin took a best result of fourth at Barcelona, whereas in the latter, he took a best result of sixth at both Vallelunga and Monza to end the season 13th overall. In parallel, Severiukhin contested the majority of the SMP F4 Championship for LADA Sport, winning nine of the 12 races he started to secure runner-up honours in points. During 2025, Severiukhin also made one-off appearances for DXR in the F4 Spanish Championship and for LADA Sport Rosneft in TCR Russia, most notably taking a podium in the latter at Moscow Raceway.

=== Formula Regional debut and rookie TCR Russia campaign (2026) ===
In early 2026, Severiukhin joined G4 Racing to compete in the Formula Regional Middle East Trophy. In the four-round winter series, Severiukhin scored a best result of fifth in race two of the second Yas Marina round to take 17th in points. For the rest of the year, Severiukhin returned to LADA Sport Rosneft for his rookie season in the TCR Russian Touring Car Championship. In the seven-round season, Severiukhin took a lone podium at the second NRING round on his debut with Lukoil Racing Twins Team en route to ninth in points. During 2026, Severiukhin also reunited with Jenzer Motorsport to race in the Vallelunga round of the Italian F4 Championship.

== Karting record ==
=== Karting career summary ===
Season	Series	Team	Position
2017	Trofeo Delle Industrie — 60 Mini	Energy Corse	24th
2018	South Garda Winter Cup — Mini Rok	Energy Corse	29th
2018	WSK Super Master Series — 60 Mini	Energy Corse	101st
2018	WSK Open Cup — 60 Mini	Energy Corse	NC
2018	WSK Final Cup — OK-J	Ward Racing	35th
2019	WSK Super Master Series — OK-J	Ward Racing	2nd
2019	South Garda Winter Cup — OK-J	Ward Racing	5th
2019	Coupe de France — OK-J	Ward Racing	52nd
2019	Karting European Championship — OK-J	Ward Racing	39th
2019	WSK Euro Series — OK-J	Ward Racing	12th
2019	Italian Karting Championship — OK-J	Ward Racing	2nd
2019	Karting World Championship — OK-J	Ward Racing	32nd
2019	WSK Open Cup — OK-J	Ward Racing	2nd
2019	WSK Final Cup — OK-J	Ward Racing	5th
2019	Trofeo Delle Industrie — OK-J	Ward Racing	3rd
2020	WSK Champions Cup — OK-J	Ward Racing	4th
2020	WSK Super Master Series — OK-J	Ward Racing	17th
2020	South Garda Winter Cup — OK-J	Ward Racing	9th
2021	WSK Champions Cup — OK	Ward Racing	5th
2021	WSK Super Master Series — OK	Ward Racing	5th
2021	Champions of the Future — OK	Ward Racing	20th
2021	Karting European Championship — OK	Ward Racing	5th
2021	Italian Karting Championship — OK	Ward Racing	3rd
2021	WSK Euro Series — OK	Ward Racing	12th
2021	WSK Open Cup — OK	Ward Racing	11th
2021	Karting World Championship — OK	Ward Racing	6th
2021	South Garda Winter Cup — OK	Ward Racing	2nd
2021	Trofeo Grifone — OK	Ward Racing	6th
2022	WSK Super Master Series — OK	Ward Racing	7th
2022	Champions of the Future — OK	Ward Racing	9th
2022	Karting European Championship — OK	Ward Racing	72nd
2023	WSK Champions Cup — KZ2	Racing Line	7th
2023	WSK Super Master Series — KZ2	Racing Line	60th
2023	Karting European Championship — KZ2	Motor Club Deportivo Creixell	14th
2023	WSK Open Series — KZ2	Racing Line	49th
2023	Deutsche Kart-Meisterschaft — KZ2		NC
2023	Karting World Cup — KZ2	Motor Club Deportivo Creixell	39th
2023	WSK Final Cup — KZ2	Racing Line	21st
2024	WSK Champions Cup — KZ2	Birel ART Racing	14th
2024	WSK Super Master Series — KZ2	Birel ART Racing	9th
2024	WSK Open Series — KZ2	Birel ART Racing	19th
2024	Karting European Championship — KZ2	Birel ART Racing	8th
2024	Champions of the Future Shifters — KZ2	Birel ART Racing	3rd
2024	Karting World Cup — KZ2	Birel ART Racing	4th

== Racing record ==
=== Racing career summary ===
Season	Series	Team	Races	Wins	Poles	F/Laps	Podiums	Points	Position
2025	Formula Winter Series	Jenzer Motorsport	12	0	0	1	0	42	10th
2025	Italian F4 Championship	Jenzer Motorsport	20	0	0	0	0	38	13th
2025	F4 Spanish Championship	DXR	3	0	0	0	0	0	38th
2025	SMP F4 Championship	LADA Sport	12	9	2	7	10	303	**2nd**
2025	TCR Russian Touring Car Championship	LADA Sport Rosneft	4	0	0	0	1	36	13th
2026	Formula Regional Middle East Trophy	G4 Racing	11	0	0	0	0	14	17th
2026	TCR Russian Touring Car Championship	LADA Sport Rosneft	8	0	0	3	0	140	9th
2026	TCR Russian Touring Car Championship	Lukoil Racing Twins Team	6	0	0	0	1	140	9th
2026	Italian F4 Championship	Jenzer Motorsport	3	0	0	0	0	20	37th

* Season still in progress.

=== Complete Formula Winter Series results ===
(key) (Races in bold indicate pole position) (Races in italics indicate fastest lap)

Year	Team	1	2	3	4	5	6	7	8	9	10	11	12	DC	Points
2025	Jenzer Motorsport	POR; 1; 21	POR; 2; 11	POR; 3; 9	CRT; 1; 23	CRT; 2 Ret	CRT; 3; 10	ARA; 1; 8	ARA; 2; 16	ARA; 3; 9	CAT; 1; 4	CAT; 2; 4	CAT; 3; 6	10th	42

=== Complete F4 Spanish Championship results ===
(key) (Races in bold indicate pole position; races in italics indicate fastest lap)

Year	Team	1	2	3	4	5	6	7	8	9	10	11	12	13	14	15	16	17	18	19	20	21	DC	Points
2025	DXR	ARA; 1; 30	ARA; 2; 33	ARA; 3; 26	NAV; 1	NAV; 2	NAV; 3	POR; 1	POR; 2	POR; 3	LEC; 1	LEC; 2	LEC; 3	JER; 1	JER; 2	JER; 3	CRT; 1	CRT; 2	CRT; 3	CAT; 1	CAT; 2	CAT; 3	38th	0

=== Complete SMP F4 Championship results ===
(key) (Races in bold indicate pole position; races in italics indicate fastest lap)

Year	Team	1	2	3	4	5	6	7	8	9	10	11	12	13	14	15	16	17	18	DC	Points
2025	LADA Sport	MRA1; 1; 14^{3}†	MRA1; 2; 1	MRA1; 3; 9	IGO; 1; 1^{2}	**IGO**; **2**; 1^{1}	IGO; 3; 1	NRG; 1	NRG; 2	NRG; 3	MRA2; 1; 1^{2}	**MRA2**; **2**; 1^{1}	MRA2; 3; 1	KZR; 1; 1^{3}	KZR; 2; 1^{4}	KZR; 3; 2	FGA; 1	FGA; 2	FGA; 3	2nd	303

=== Complete Italian F4 Championship results ===
(key) (Races in bold indicate pole position; races in italics indicate fastest lap)

Year	Team	1	2	3	4	5	6	7	8	9	10	11	12	13	14	15	16	17	18	19	20	21	22	23	24	25	26	27	28	DC	Points
2025	Jenzer Motorsport	MIS1; 1; 9	MIS1; 2; 8	MIS1; 3	MIS1; 4; 13	VLL; 1; 6	VLL; 2; 8	VLL; 3	VLL; 4; 7	MNZ; 1; 27	MNZ; 2; 35†	MNZ; 3; 6	MUG; 1; 17	MUG; 2; 35†	MUG; 3; 11	IMO; 1; 15	IMO; 2 C	IMO; 3; 13	CAT; 1; 8	CAT; 2; 15	CAT; 3 C	MIS2; 1; 29	MIS2; 2; 10	MIS2; 3	MIS2; 4; 17	MIS2; 5; 10				13th	38
2026	Jenzer Motorsport	MIS1; 1	MIS1; 2	MIS1; 3	MIS1; 4	VLL; 1; 18	VLL; 2	VLL; 3; 4	VLL; 4 Ret	MNZ; 1	MNZ; 2	MNZ; 3	MNZ; 4	MUG1; 1	MUG1; 2	MUG1; 3	MUG1; 4	IMO; 1	IMO; 2	IMO; 3	IMO; 4	MIS2; 1	MIS2; 2	MIS2; 3	MIS2; 4	MUG2; 1	MUG2; 2	MUG2; 3	MUG2; 4	37th	20

* Season still in progress.

=== Complete Formula Regional Middle East Trophy results ===
(key) (Races in bold indicate pole position) (Races in italics indicate fastest lap)

Year	Entrant	1	2	3	4	5	6	7	8	9	10	11	12	DC	Points
2026	G4 Racing	YMC1; 1; 13	YMC1; 2; 16	YMC1; 3; 9	YMC2; 1; 5	YMC2; 2; 27	YMC2; 3; 9	DUB; 1; 28	DUB; 2; 22	DUB; 3; 18	LUS; 1; 12	LUS; 2 C	LUS; 3 Ret	17th	14
