= Kirill Kutskov =

Russian racing driver (born 2008)

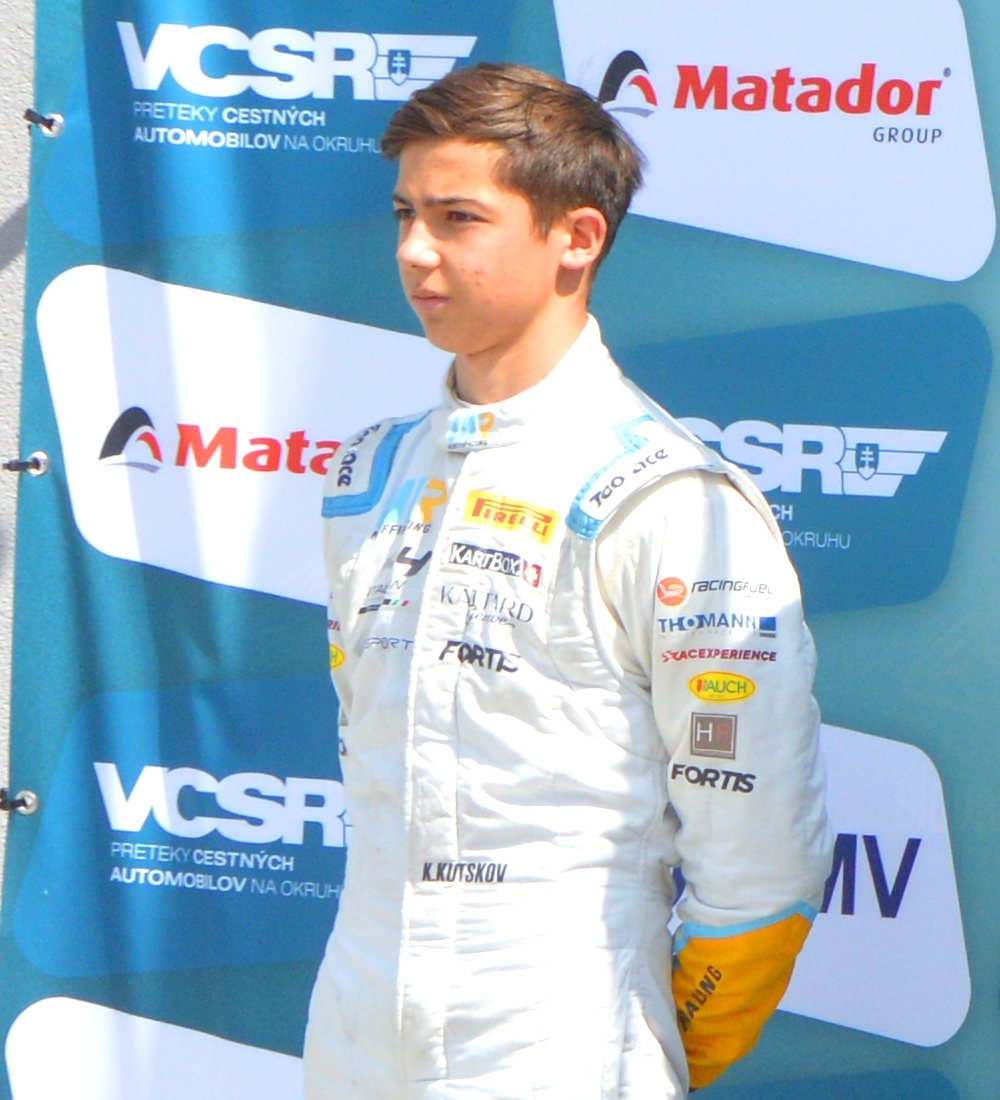
- Kutskov in 2025
- Nationality: (Russia) Russian (Kyrgyzstan) Kyrgyz (Note: Kutskov is Russian but competes under a Kyrgyz licence as Russian national emblems were banned by the FIA following the Russian invasion of Ukraine.)
- Born: Kirill Ilych Kutskov; 28 May 2008 (age 18) Moscow, Russia

GB3 Championship career
- Debut season: 2026
- Car number: 17
- Former teams: Elite Motorsport
- Starts: 5
- Wins: 0
- Podiums: 0
- Poles: 0
- Fastest laps: 0
- Best finish: 24th in 2026

Previous series
- 2025 2025 2024–2025 2024–2026 2024–2025 2024: SMP F4; Formula Winter Series; F4 Spanish; Italian F4; F4 CEZ; F4 Saudi Arabian
- Statistics up to date as of 19 November 2026.

Kirill Ilych Kutskov (Russian: Кирилл Ильич Куцков; born 28 May 2008) is a Russian racing driver who last competed in the GB3 Championship for Elite Motorsport.

Kutskov is the 2024 F4 CEZ runner-up, and finished third in the 2024 F4 Saudi Arabian Championship.

== Career ==
=== Karting (2017–2024) ===
Kutskov began karting in 2017, competing until 2024. In his two-year stint in Mini karts, he most notably won the Trofeo Delle Industrie in 2019 and finished second in the South Garda Winter Cup the same year. Kutskov then progressed up to OK-J for the next two years, finishing runner-up in the Champions of the Future points in 2021 and third in the 2022 WSK Euro Series standings. Stepping up to OK for 2023, Kutskov had what turned out to be his most successful year in karts, winning both the WSK Euro Series and the Karting World Championship for DPK Racing, before stepping up to KZ2 in 2024.

=== Formula 4 (2023–2025) ===
Kutskov made his single-seater debut in late 2023, racing in the Trophy round of the 2024 F4 Saudi Arabian Championship, in which he scored a best result of fourth in race one. Racing in the main season at the start of the following year, Kutskov took his only win of the season in Jeddah and scored seven more podiums to end the season third in points. Joining Maffi Racing for the rest of 2024 to race in the Formula 4 CEZ Championship, Kutskov started the season with a win in Balaton Park and four podiums in the first three rounds to put himself second in points by the halfway mark. Kutskov then won at Most and Brno, before ending the season by winning all three races at the Salzburgring to finish runner-up in points to Oscar Wurz. During 2024, Kutskov also made his Italian F4 debut at Monza for the same team, and made a one-off appearance in the F4 Spanish Championship for GRS Team at Jarama.

Returning to Maffi Racing for 2025, Kutskov raced with them in select rounds of the Formula Winter Series. After scoring a best result of seventh in Barcelona, Kutskov returned to the team to contest his first full season in the Italian F4 Championship. In the seven-round season, Kutskov took a best result of fourth in the season-ending Misano round to end the year 18th in the overall standings. Kutskov also raced with the same team in the last two rounds of the Formula 4 CEZ Championship, scoring two wins at Slovakia Ring and ending the year with a win at Brno. During 2025, Kutskov also competed in the SMP F4 Championship for Prima Racing, in which he scored two wins in the season-opening round in Moscow and took three more podiums to finish ninth in points.

=== GB3 and F4 return (2026) ===
The following year, Kutskov joined Elite Motorsport to compete in the GB3 Championship. After competing in the first two rounds with the team, Kutskov left the series when a planned move to AKCEL GP for the remainder of the season fell through. During 2026, Kutskov made a one-off return to Italian F4 with Alpha 54 Racing at the first Mugello round.

== Karting record ==
=== Karting career summary ===
| Season | Series | Team | Position |
|---|---|---|---|
| 2017 | Trofeo Invernal Ayrton Senna – 60 Mini | | 19th |
| 2017 | WSK Final Cup – 60 Mini | Energy Corse | 11th |
| 2018 | WSK Champions Cup – 60 Mini | Energy Corse | NC |
| 2018 | WSK Super Master Series – 60 Mini | Energy Corse | 6th |
| 2018 | South Garda Winter Cup – Mini Rok | Energy Corse | 17th |
| 2018 | WSK Open Cup – 60 Mini | Energy Corse | 23rd |
| 2018 | WSK Final Cup – 60 Mini | BabyRace Driver Academy | 6th |
| 2018 | ROK Cup International Final – Mini Rok | | 25th |
| 2019 | WSK Champions Cup – 60 Mini | Energy Corse | 13th |
| 2019 | WSK Super Master Series – 60 Mini | Energy Corse | 13th |
| 2019 | South Garda Winter Cup – Mini Rok | Energy Corse | 2nd |
| 2019 | Trofeo Delle Industrie – 60 Mini | Energy Corse | 1st |
| 2019 | WSK Euro Series – 60 Mini | Energy Corse | 13th |
| 2019 | WSK Open Cup – 60 Mini | Energy Corse | 7th |
| 2019 | WSK Final Cup – 60 Mini | Energy Corse | 7th |
| 2019 | Rok Cup Superfinal – Mini Rok | Energy Corse | 7th |
| 2019 | Italian Karting Championship – 60 Mini | | 10th |
| 2020 | WSK Champions Cup – OK-J | Ward Racing | 9th |
| 2020 | WSK Super Master Series – OK-J | Ward Racing | 29th |
| 2020 | Champions of the Future – OK-J | Ward Racing | NC |
| 2020 | Karting World Championship – OK-J | Ward Racing | NC |
| 2021 | WSK Champions Cup – OK-J | KR Motorsport | 17th |
| 2021 | WSK Super Master Series – OK-J | KR Motorsport | 6th |
| 2021 | WSK Euro Series – OK-J | KR Motorsport | 12th |
| 2021 | Karting European Championship – OK-J | KR Motorsport | 9th |
| 2021 | WSK Open Cup – OK-J | KR Motorsport | 23rd |
| 2021 | Champions of the Future – OK-J | KR Motorsport; Forza Racing (Note: Kutskov raced for KR Motorsport in rounds 1–2 and for Forza Racing in round 3.) | 2nd |
| 2021 | Karting World Championship – OK-J | Forza Racing | 32nd |
| 2021 | South Garda Winter Cup – OK-J | Forza Racing | 24th |
| 2021 | WSK Final Cup – OK-J | Forza Racing | 30th |
| 2022 | WSK Super Master Series – OK-J | Birel ART Racing | 6th |
| 2022 | Champions of the Future Winter Series – OK-J | Birel ART Racing | 14th |
| 2022 | Champions of the Future – OK-J | Birel ART Racing | 26th |
| 2022 | Karting European Championship – OK-J | Birel ART Racing | 12th |
| 2022 | WSK Euro Series – OK-J | Birel ART Racing | 3rd |
| 2022 | Karting World Championship – OK-J | Birel ART Racing | 23rd |
| 2022 | WSK Open Cup – OK | Birel ART Racing | 7th |
| 2022 | WSK Final Cup – OK | Birel ART Racing | 27th |
| 2023 | WSK Super Master Series – OK | Birel ART Racing; DPK Racing (Note: Kutskov raced for Birel ART Racing in rounds 1–2 and for DPK Racing in round 4.) | 12th |
| 2023 | Champions of the Future – OK | DPK Racing | 25th |
| 2023 | Karting European Championship – OK | DPK Racing | 17th |
| 2023 | WSK Euro Series – OK | DPK Racing | 1st |
| 2023 | Karting World Championship – OK | DPK Racing | 1st |
| 2023 | WSK Final Cup – OK | DPK Racing | 12th |
| 2024 | WSK Champions Cup – KZ2 | Birel ART Racing | 31st |
| 2024 | WSK Super Master Series – KZ2 | Birel ART Racing | 45th |
| 2024 | Karting European Championship – KZ2 | Birel ART Racing | 17th |
| 2024 | Champions of the Future – KZ2 | Birel ART Racing | 30th |
| 2024 | Karting World Cup – KZ2 | Birel ART Racing | NC |

== Racing record ==
=== Racing career summary ===
| Season | Series | Team | Races | Wins | Poles | F/Laps | Podiums | Points | Position |
|---|---|---|---|---|---|---|---|---|---|
| 2023 | F4 Saudi Arabian Championship – Trophy Event | Altawkilat Meritus.GP | 8 | 0 | 0 | 0 | 0 | —N/a | NC |
| 2024 | F4 Saudi Arabian Championship | Altawkilat Meritus.GP | 17 | 1 | 0 | 0 | 8 | 177.5 | **3rd** |
| 2024 | Formula 4 CEZ Championship | Maffi Racing | 18 | 6 | 2 | 3 | 11 | 276 | **2nd** |
| 2024 | Italian F4 Championship | Maffi Racing | 3 | 0 | 0 | 0 | 0 | 6 | 24th |
| 2024 | F4 Spanish Championship | GRS Team | 3 | 0 | 0 | 0 | 0 | 0 | 39th |
| 2025 | Formula Winter Series | Maffi Racing | 6 | 0 | 0 | 0 | 0 | 10 | 16th |
| 2025 | Italian F4 Championship | Maffi Racing | 20 | 0 | 0 | 1 | 0 | 29 | 18th |
| 2025 | Formula 4 CEZ Championship | Maffi Racing | 6 | 3 | 0 | 1 | 5 | 117 | 6th |
| 2025 | SMP F4 Championship | Prima Racing | 12 | 2 | 0 | 1 | 5 | 163 | 9th |
| 2025 | F4 Spanish Championship | Drivex | 3 | 0 | 0 | 0 | 0 | 0 | NC† |
| 2026 | GB3 Championship | Elite Motorsport | 5 | 0 | 0 | 0 | 0 | 40 | 24th |
| 2026 | Italian F4 Championship | Alpha 54 Racing | 3 | 0 | 0 | 0 | 0 | 0 | 52nd |

^{†} As Kutskov was a guest driver, he was ineligible to score points.
* Season still in progress.

=== Complete F4 Saudi Arabian Championship results ===
(key) (Races in bold indicate pole position; races in italics indicate fastest lap)

| Year | Entrant | 1 | 2 | 3 | 4 | 5 | 6 | 7 | 8 | 9 | 10 | 11 | 12 | 13 | 14 | 15 | 16 | 17 | Pos | Points |
|---|---|---|---|---|---|---|---|---|---|---|---|---|---|---|---|---|---|---|---|---|
| 2024 | Altawkilat Meritus.GP | KMT; 1; 4 | KMT; 2; 7 | KMT; 3; 6 | KMT; 4; 2 | LSL; 1; 7 | LSL; 2 Ret | LSL; 3; 8 | LSL; 4; 4 | JED1; 1; 2 | JED1; 2; 3 | JED1; 3; 6 | JED2; 1; 1 | JED2; 2; 5 | JED2; 3; 2 | JED3; 1; 3 | JED3; 2; 2 | JED3; 3; 3 | 3rd | 177.5 |

=== Complete Formula 4 CEZ Championship results ===
(key) (Races in bold indicate pole position; races in italics indicate fastest lap)

| Year | Entrant | 1 | 2 | 3 | 4 | 5 | 6 | 7 | 8 | 9 | 10 | 11 | 12 | 13 | 14 | 15 | 16 | 17 | 18 | Pos | Points |
|---|---|---|---|---|---|---|---|---|---|---|---|---|---|---|---|---|---|---|---|---|---|
| 2024 | Maffi Racing | BAL; 1; 4 | BAL; 2; 3 | BAL; 3; 1 | RBR; 1 Ret | RBR; 2; 23† | RBR; 3 Ret | SVK; 1; 2 | SVK; 2; 3 | SVK; 3; 4 | MOS; 1; 4 | MOS; 2; 1 | MOS; 3; 2 | **BRN**; **1**; 2 | BRN; 2 Ret | BRN; 3; 1 | **SAL**; **1**; 1 | SAL; 2; 1 | SAL; 3; 1 | 2nd | 276 |
| 2025 | Maffi Racing | RBR1; 1 | RBR1; 2 | RBR1; 3 | RBR2; 1 | RBR2; 2 | RBR2; 3 | SAL; 1 | SAL; 2 | SAL; 3 | MOS; 1 | MOS; 2 | MOS; 3 | SVK; 1; 1 | SVK; 2; 1 | SVK; 3; 4 | BRN; 1; 3 | BRN; 2; 3 | BRN; 3; 1 | 6th | 117 |

=== Complete F4 Spanish Championship results ===
(key) (Races in bold indicate pole position; races in italics indicate fastest lap)

| Year | Entrant | 1 | 2 | 3 | 4 | 5 | 6 | 7 | 8 | 9 | 10 | 11 | 12 | 13 | 14 | 15 | 16 | 17 | 18 | 19 | 20 | 21 | Pos | Points |
|---|---|---|---|---|---|---|---|---|---|---|---|---|---|---|---|---|---|---|---|---|---|---|---|---|
| 2024 | GRS Team | JAR; 1; 20 | JAR; 2; 18 | JAR; 3; 23 | POR; 1 | POR; 2 | POR; 3 | LEC; 1 | LEC; 2 | LEC; 3 | ARA; 1 | ARA; 2 | ARA; 3 | CRT; 1 | CRT; 2 | CRT; 3 | JER; 1 | JER; 2 | JER; 3 | CAT; 1 | CAT; 2 | CAT; 3 | 39th | 0 |
| 2025 | Drivex | ARA; 1 | ARA; 2 | ARA; 3 | NAV; 1 | NAV; 2 | NAV; 3 | POR; 1 | POR; 2 | POR; 3 | LEC; 1 | LEC; 2 | LEC; 3 | JER; 1 | JER; 2 | JER; 3 | CRT; 1 | CRT; 2 | CRT; 3 | CAT; 1; 21 | CAT; 2; 13 | CAT; 3; 32† | NC† | 0 |

^{†} As Kutskov was a guest driver, he was ineligible to score points.

=== Complete Italian F4 Championship results ===
| Year | Entrant | 1 | 2 | 3 | 4 | 5 | 6 | 7 | 8 | 9 | 10 | 11 | 12 | 13 | 14 | 15 | 16 | 17 | 18 | 19 | 20 | 21 | 22 | 23 | 24 | 25 | 26 | 27 | 28 | Pos | Points |
|---|---|---|---|---|---|---|---|---|---|---|---|---|---|---|---|---|---|---|---|---|---|---|---|---|---|---|---|---|---|---|---|
| 2024 | Maffi Racing | MIS; 1 | MIS; 2 | MIS; 3 | IMO; 1 | IMO; 2 | IMO; 3 | VLL; 1 | VLL; 2 | VLL; 3 | MUG; 1 | MUG; 2 | MUG; 3 | LEC; 1 | LEC; 2 | LEC; 3 | CAT; 1 | CAT; 2 | CAT; 3 | MNZ; 1; 19 | MNZ; 2; 7 | MNZ; 3; 13 | | | | | | | | 24th | 6 |
| 2025 | Maffi Racing | MIS1; 1 | MIS1; 2; 18 | MIS1; 3; 19 | MIS1; 4; 23 | VLL; 1; 10 | VLL; 2 | VLL; 3; 6 | VLL; 4; 13 | MNZ; 1; 24 | MNZ; 2; 13 | MNZ; 3; 17 | MUG; 1; 16 | MUG; 2; 18 | MUG; 3; 19 | IMO; 1; 17 | IMO; 2 C | IMO; 3; 25 | CAT; 1; 29 | CAT; 2; 26 | CAT; 3 C | MIS2; 1; 8 | MIS2; 2; 4 | MIS2; 3 | MIS2; 4; 8 | MIS2; 5; 30† | | | | 18th | 29 |
| 2026 | Alpha 54 Racing | MIS1; 1 | MIS1; 2 | MIS1; 3 | MIS1; 4 | VLL; 1 | VLL; 2 | VLL; 3 | VLL; 4 | MNZ; 1 | MNZ; 2 | MNZ; 3 | MNZ; 4 | MUG1; 1 | MUG1; 2; 16 | MUG1; 3; 17 | MUG1; 4; 24 | IMO; 1 | IMO; 2 | IMO; 3 | IMO; 4 | MIS2; 1 | MIS2; 2 | MIS2; 3 | MIS2; 4 | MUG2; 1 | MUG2; 2 | MUG2; 3 | MUG2; 4 | 52nd | 0 |

=== Complete Formula Winter Series results ===
(key) (Races in bold indicate pole position) (Races in italics indicate fastest lap)

| Year | Team | 1 | 2 | 3 | 4 | 5 | 6 | 7 | 8 | 9 | 10 | 11 | 12 | DC | Points |
|---|---|---|---|---|---|---|---|---|---|---|---|---|---|---|---|
| 2025 | Maffi Racing | POR; 1; 8 | POR; 2; 14 | POR; 3; 24 | CRT; 1 | CRT; 2 | CRT; 3 | ARA; 1 | ARA; 2 | ARA; 3 | CAT; 1; 16 | CAT; 2; 20 | CAT; 3; 7 | 16th | 10 |

=== Complete GB3 Championship results ===
(key) (Races in bold indicate pole position; races in italics indicate fastest lap; ^{superscript} indicates points for positions gained)

| Year | Entrant | 1 | 2 | 3 | 4 | 5 | 6 | 7 | 8 | 9 | 10 | 11 | 12 | 13 | 14 | 15 | 16 | 17 | 18 | 19 | 20 | 21 | 22 | 23 | 24 | Pos | Points |
|---|---|---|---|---|---|---|---|---|---|---|---|---|---|---|---|---|---|---|---|---|---|---|---|---|---|---|---|
| 2026 | Elite Motorsport | SIL1; 1; 19 | SIL1; 2; 13 | SIL1; 3; 15^{2} | SPA; 1; 7 | SPA; 2; 9 | SPA; 3 C | HUN; 1 | HUN; 2 | HUN; 3 | RBR; 1 | RBR; 2 | RBR; 3 | SIL2; 1 | SIL2; 2 | SIL2; 3 | DON; 1 | DON; 2 | DON; 3 | BRH; 1 | BRH; 2 | BRH; 3 | CAT; 1 | CAT; 2 | CAT; 3 | 24th | 40 |
