= Kirill Smal =

Russian racing driver (born 2005)

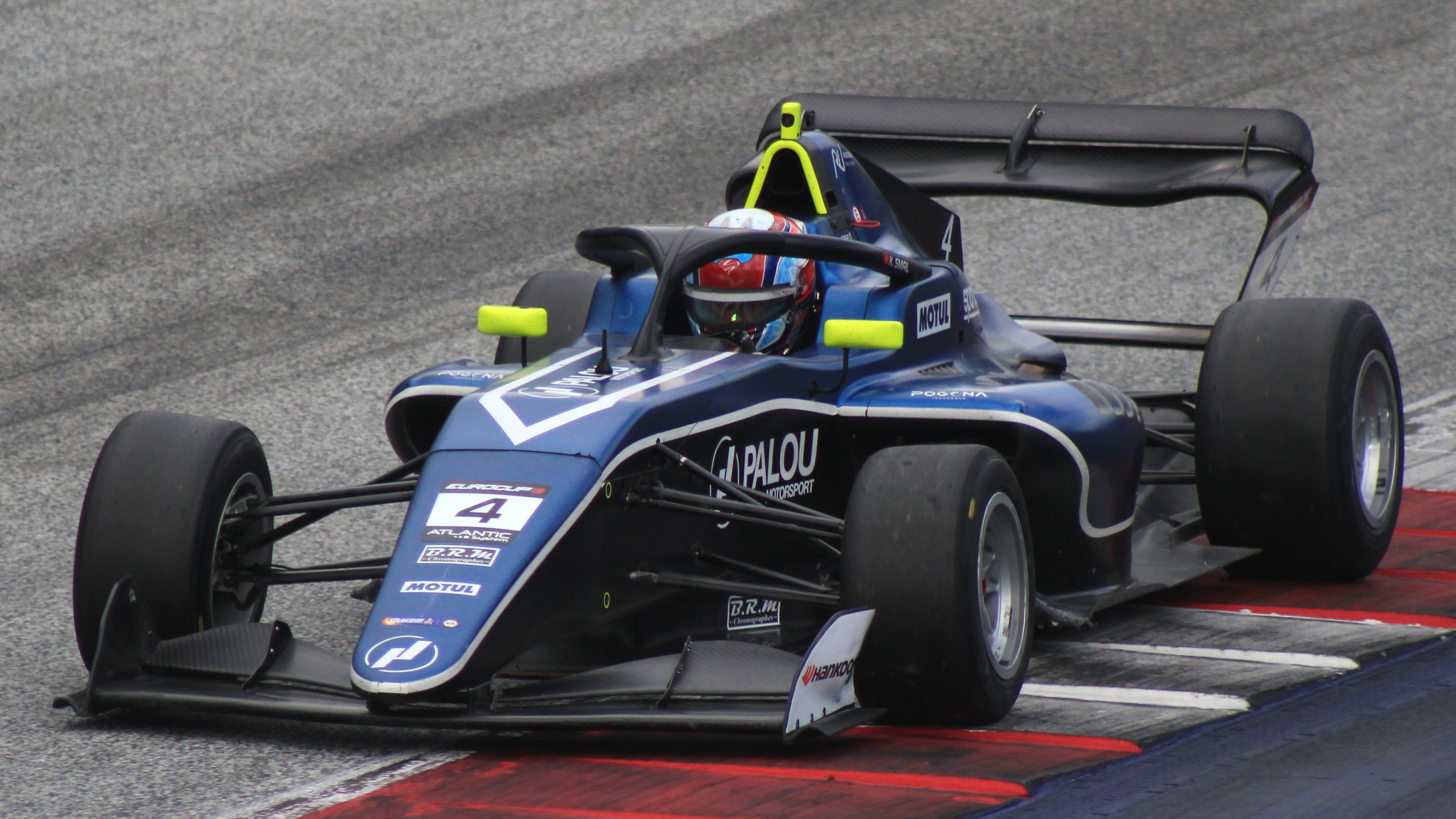
- Smal racing at the Red Bull Ring during the 2024 Eurocup-3 season.
- Nationality: (Russia) Russian
- Born: Kirill Yevgenyevich Smal; 20 May 2005 (age 21) Aramil, Russia

Eurocup-3 career
- Debut season: 2024
- Current team: Palou Motorsport
- Car number: 4
- Starts: 3
- Wins: 0
- Podiums: 1
- Poles: 0
- Fastest laps: 0
- Best finish: TBD in 2024

Previous series
- 2023 2022 2021 2020-2021 2020-2021: Formula Regional European Championship; F4 Spanish Championship; Formula 4 UAE Championship; Italian F4 Championship; ADAC Formula 4

Kirill Yevgenyevich Smal (Russian: Кирилл Евгеньевич Смаль; born 20 May 2005) is a Russian racing driver who last competed in the 2024 Eurocup-3 season for Palou Motorsport.

== Career ==
=== Karting ===
Smal started karting in 2012. He participated in the Russian Karting Championship until 2015. In 2016, he came second in the 60 Mini category of the WSK Final Cup. In 2018, he finished fifth in the OK Junior category of the Karting World Championship with the support of SMP Racing and the following year he came fourth in the OK category.

=== Formula 4 ===
In 2020, Smal made his single-seater debut by competing in the ADAC Formula 4 Championship with R-ace GP. He finished the season ninth in the standings after claiming three podiums and a pole position throughout the season. Together with Race GP, Smal also competed in a single round of the Italian F4 Championship before joining Prema Powerteam to compete in further rounds of the championship. He took his first podium in the final race of the season.

In 2021, Smal joined Xcel Motorsport to compete in the Formula 4 UAE Championship. He finished the season at third after taking four wins. Afterwards, he rejoined Prema Powerteam to contest the full 2021 Italian F4 Championship. He finished the championship in third after taking his only win of the season in the season-opening race at Circuit Paul Ricard. He also contested the opening two rounds of the ADAC Formula 4 Championship where he took a win at Circuit Zandvoort.

In 2022, Smal joined MP Motorsport to compete in the F4 Spanish Championship after initially stating that he wouldn't race outside of Russia that year. Following the ban of Russian emblems, he competed under the flag of Kyrgyzstan. He finished the season fourth in the standings.

In 2023, Smal made an appearance for MP Motorsport in the opening round of the Formula 4 UAE Championship as a replacement for Jerónimo Berrío.

=== Formula Regional ===
At the beginning of 2022, Smal was expected to join KIC Motorsport in the Formula Regional European Championship. He ultimately did not compete in the championship after SMP Racing withdrew its support in international motorsport due to the FIA's ban of Russian emblems following the Russian invasion of Ukraine.

In 2023, Smal joined Mumbai Falcons Racing Limited for a part-time campaign in the Formula Regional Middle East Championship. He scored his first podium in the final round of the season at the Yas Marina Circuit. He then joined Monolite Racing in the Formula Regional European Championship after missing the first round of the season.

=== Sports car racing ===
In 2023, Smal also made his debut in sports car racing. He joined CD Sport to compete in the Le Mans Cup with Fabien Michal being his teammate. The pair secured their first podium in the opening round of the season at Circuit de Barcelona-Catalunya.

=== Eurocup-3 ===
In 2024, Smal made his debut in the Eurocup-3 series driving for Palou Motorsport, the team owned by three-time IndyCar champion Álex Palou. Smal finished on the podium in his debut race at Spa-Francorchamps. In the second round at Red Bull Ring, he finished fourth in race one, but retired from race two with a late puncture. However, despite this strong start, he left the series following the second round.

== Racing record ==
=== Racing career summary ===
Season	Series	Team	Races	Wins	Poles	F/Laps	Podiums	Points	Position
2020	ADAC Formula 4 Championship	R-ace GP	20	0	1	0	3	91	9th
2020	Italian F4 Championship	R-ace GP	2	0	0	0	0	30	15th
2020	Italian F4 Championship	Prema Powerteam	8	0	0	0	1	30	15th
2021	Formula 4 UAE Championship	Xcel Motorsport	20	4	0	2	12	289	**3rd**
2021	Italian F4 Championship	Prema Powerteam	21	1	1	2	5	198	**3rd**
2021	ADAC Formula 4 Championship	Prema Powerteam	6	1	0	1	2	70	10th
2022	F4 Spanish Championship	MP Motorsport	21	0	0	0	8	173	4th
2023	Formula Regional Middle East Championship	Mumbai Falcons Racing Limited	9	0	0	0	1	32	15th
2023	Formula 4 UAE Championship	MP Motorsport	3	0	0	0	0	22	16th
2023	Formula Regional European Championship	Monolite Racing	10	0	0	0	0	0	28th
2023	Le Mans Cup - LMP3	CD Sport	7	0	1	0	4	69	**2nd**
2024	Russian Circuit Racing Series - Touring	Lukoil Racing SMP Team	14	1	0	2	1	134	8th
2024	Eurocup-3	Palou Motorsport	3	0	0	0	1	27	13th
2025	Middle East Trophy - GT3	SMP Racing							
2025	Russian Circuit Racing Series - Touring	SMP Racing	2	0	0	0	0	15	14th
2026	Russian Circuit Racing Series - GT4	Sportcar Racing Team							
2026	Russian Circuit Racing Series - GT4	VRacing Team							

* Season still in progress.

=== Complete ADAC Formula 4 Championship results ===
(key) (Races in bold indicate pole position) (Races in italics indicate fastest lap)

Year	Team	1	2	3	4	5	6	7	8	9	10	11	12	13	14	15	16	17	18	19	20	21	Pos	Points
2020	R-ace GP	LAU1; 1; 11	LAU1; 2; 5	LAU1; 3; 3	NÜR1; 1; 12	NÜR1; 2; 12	NÜR1; 3 DNS	HOC; 1; 12	HOC; 2; 14	HOC; 3; 15	NÜR2; 1; 12†	NÜR2; 2; 10	NÜR2; 3; 7	RBR; 1; 11	RBR; 2; 6	RBR; 3; 6	LAU2; 1; 6	**LAU2**; **2**; 3	LAU2; 3; 3	OSC; 1; 9	OSC; 2; 13†	OSC; 3; 9	9th	91
2021	Prema Powerteam	RBR; 1; 3	RBR; 2; 6	RBR; 3 Ret	ZAN; 1; 5	ZAN; 2; 5	ZAN; 3; 1	NÜR; 1	NÜR; 2	NÜR; 3	HOC1; 1	HOC1; 2	HOC1; 3	SAC; 1	SAC; 2	SAC; 3	HOC2; 1	HOC2; 2	HOC2; 3				10th	70

=== Complete Italian F4 Championship results ===
(key) (Races in bold indicate pole position) (Races in italics indicate fastest lap)

Year	Team	1	2	3	4	5	6	7	8	9	10	11	12	13	14	15	16	17	18	19	20	21	Pos	Points
2020	R-ace GP	MIS; 1	MIS; 2	MIS; 3	IMO1; 1	IMO1; 2	IMO1; 3	RBR; 1; 18	RBR; 2; 25	RBR; 3 DNS													15th	30
2020	Prema Powerteam										MUG; 1; 7	MUG; 2; 13	MUG; 3; 17	MNZ; 1	MNZ; 2	MNZ; 3	IMO2; 1; 8	IMO2; 2 Ret	IMO2; 3; 9	VLL; 1; 11	VLL; 2 C	VLL; 3; 2	15th	30
2021	Prema Powerteam	**LEC**; **1**; 1	LEC; 2; 3	LEC; 3 Ret	MIS; 1; 9	MIS; 2; 4	MIS; 3; 4	VLL; 1; 7	VLL; 2; 6	VLL; 3; 5	IMO; 1 Ret	IMO; 2; 25	IMO; 3; 14	RBR; 1; 4	RBR; 2; 4	RBR; 3; 3	MUG; 1; 6	MUG; 2; 3	MUG; 3; 4	MNZ; 1; 6	MNZ; 2; 5	MNZ; 3; 2	3rd	198

=== Complete Formula 4 UAE Championship results ===
(key) (Races in bold indicate pole position) (Races in italics indicate fastest lap)

Year	Team	1	2	3	4	5	6	7	8	9	10	11	12	13	14	15	16	17	18	19	20	Pos	Points
2021	Xcel Motorsport	DUB1; 1; 4	DUB1; 2; 3	DUB1; 3; 3	DUB1; 4; 1	YMC1; 1; 9	YMC1; 2; 5	YMC1; 3 Ret	YMC1; 4; 2	DUB2; 1; 3	DUB2; 2; 3	DUB2; 3; 1	DUB2; 4; 1	YMC2; 1; 2	YMC2; 2; 5	YMC2; 3; 8	YMC2; 4; 4	DUB3; 1; 3	DUB3; 2; 2	DUB3; 3; 6	DUB3; 4; 1	3rd	289
2023	MP Motorsport	DUB1; 1; 6	DUB1; 2; 4	DUB1; 3; 9	KMT1; 1	KMT1; 2	KMT1; 3	KMT2; 1	KMT2; 2	KMT2; 3	DUB2; 1	DUB2; 2	DUB2; 3	YMC; 1	YMC; 2	YMC; 3						16th	22

=== Complete F4 Spanish Championship results ===
(key) (Races in bold indicate pole position) (Races in italics indicate fastest lap)

Year	Team	1	2	3	4	5	6	7	8	9	10	11	12	13	14	15	16	17	18	19	20	21	Pos	Points
2022	MP Motorsport	ALG; 1; 9	ALG; 2; 7	ALG; 3; 11	JER; 1; 6	JER; 2; 5	JER; 3; 8	CRT; 1; 7	CRT; 2; 5	CRT; 3; 3	SPA; 1; 4	SPA; 2; 3	SPA; 3; 13	ARA; 1; 3	ARA; 2 Ret	ARA; 3; 3	NAV; 1; 2	NAV; 2; 3	NAV; 3; 23†	CAT; 1; 2	CAT; 2; 4	CAT; 3; 2	4th	173

=== Complete Formula Regional Middle East Championship results ===
(key) (Races in bold indicate pole position) (Races in italics indicate fastest lap)

Year	Entrant	1	2	3	4	5	6	7	8	9	10	11	12	13	14	15	DC	Points
2023	Mumbai Falcons Racing Limited	DUB1; 1	DUB1; 2	DUB1; 3	KUW1; 1	KUW1; 2	KUW1; 3	KUW2; 1; 10	KUW2; 2; 20	KUW2; 3; 24	DUB2; 1; 12	DUB2; 2; 15	DUB2; 3; 7	ABU; 1; 8	ABU; 2; 3	ABU; 3; 7	15th	32

=== Complete Formula Regional European Championship results ===
(key) (Races in bold indicate pole position) (Races in italics indicate fastest lap)

Year	Team	1	2	3	4	5	6	7	8	9	10	11	12	13	14	15	16	17	18	19	20	DC	Points
2023	Monolite Racing	IMO; 1	IMO; 2	CAT; 1; 17	CAT; 2; 19	HUN; 1; 26	HUN; 2; 18	SPA; 1 Ret	SPA; 2; 12	MUG; 1 Ret	MUG; 2 Ret	LEC; 1; 19	LEC; 2; 18	RBR; 1	RBR; 2	MNZ; 1	MNZ; 2	ZAN; 1	ZAN; 2	HOC; 1	HOC; 2	28th	0

=== Complete Eurocup-3 results ===
(key) (Races in bold indicate pole position) (Races in italics indicate fastest lap)

Year	Team	1	2	3	4	5	6	7	8	9	10	11	12	13	14	15	16	17	DC	Points
2024	Palou Motorsport	SPA; 1; 3	SPA; 2 C	RBR; 1; 4	RBR; 2 Ret	POR; 1	POR; 2	POR; 3	LEC; 1	LEC; 2	ZAN; 1	ZAN; 2	ARA; 1	ARA; 2	JER; 1	JER; 2	CAT; 1	CAT; 2	13th	27
