= 2025 SMP F4 Championship =

Formula 4 motor racing season in Europe

The 2025 SMP F4 Championship was the first season of the relaunched SMP F4 Championship and sixth season overall after a five-year break. The season started at the Moscow Raceway on 15 May and finished at the Fort Grozny Autodrom on the 12 October.

Originally run from 2015 to 2019, with its 2017 and 2018 seasons recognised as the FIA-certified F4 North European Zone championship, SMP F4 was brought back by ex-Formula 1 drivers Vitaly Petrov and Sergey Sirotkin as a centrally-run one-off event the G-Drive SMP F4 Cup in Sirius on 30 November 2024.

In the main season, Kirill Kutskov initially took the championship lead. But the main battle unfolded between Artem Severiukhin and Yaroslav Shevyrtalov, Shevyrtalov was crowned SMP Formula 4 champion in the final round at Fort Grozny Autodrom.

The inaugural season of SMP Formula 4’s winter series took place at Sirius Autodrom from November 15, 2025 to January 25, 2026.

== Main series ==
=== Drivers ===
Team	No.	Driver	Rounds
(Russia) Texol Racing	11	(Russia) German Foteev	1
(Russia) Texol Racing	12	(Russia) Stepan Antonov	1
(Russia) Texol Racing	17	(Russia) Gerasim Skulanov	2–5
(Russia) Texol Racing	24	(Russia) Roman Sharapov	6
(Russia) Texol Racing	37	(Russia) Vladislav Ryabov	2–6
(Russia) LADA Sport	16	(Russia) Andrey Sizov	3, 6
(Russia) LADA Sport	23	(Russia) Yaroslav Shevyrtalov	All
(Russia) LADA Sport	28	(Russia) Artem Severiukhin	1–2, 4–5
(Russia) TMS Racing	18	(Russia) Mikhail Kaurov	All
(Russia) TMS Racing	54	(Russia) Marat Knyazev	5
(Russia) TMS Racing	99	(Russia) Matvey Sonkin	1–4
G-Drive Racing SMP Racing (1); Formula K Russia (2-6)	99	(Russia) Matvey Sonkin	5
G-Drive Racing SMP Racing (1); Formula K Russia (2-6)	73	(Russia) Marko Markozov	1–4, 6
G-Drive Racing SMP Racing (1); Formula K Russia (2-6)	74	(Russia) Vladimir Verkholantsev	All
(Russia) G-Drive Racing SMP Racing (1-3) (Russia) SMP Racing (4-6)	19	(Russia) Egor Stepanov-Kim	All
(Russia) G-Drive Racing SMP Racing (1-3) (Russia) SMP Racing (4-6)	33	(Russia) Egor Nosov	All
(Russia) NI racing	21	(Russia) Mikhail Yushenkov	All
(Russia) NI racing	97	(Russia) Platon Kostin	All
(Russia) ITECO Racing Team	27	(Russia) Timur Shagaliev	4–6
(Russia) ITECO Racing Team	50	(Russia) Ivan Pigaev	All
(Russia) ITECO Racing Team	86	(Russia) Sergey Peshkov	2–3
(Russia) Prima Racing	31	(Russia) Kirill Kutskov	1–2, 4–5
(Russia) Prima Racing	66	(Russia) Kirill Klestov	3
(Russia) Prima Racing	79	(Russia) Ivan Ovsienko	1
(Russia) Prima Racing	87	(Russia) Anatoly Khavalkin	2–5

=== Race calendar ===
On 8 October 2024 the calendar was announced. All rounds are held on Russian tracks as part of the Russian Circuit Racing Series weekends.

Round		Circuit	Date	Pole position	Fastest lap	Winning driver	Winning team
1	R1	(Russia) Moscow Raceway, Volokolamsk	16 May	(Russia) Yaroslav Shevyrtalov	(Russia) Platon Kostin	(Russia) Kirill Kutskov (Note: Platon Kostin originally won the race but was disqualified for not meeting the minimum fuel limit.)	(Russia) Prima Racing
1	R2	(Russia) Moscow Raceway, Volokolamsk	17 May	(Russia) Platon Kostin	(Russia) Kirill Kutskov	(Russia) Artem Severiukhin	(Russia) LADA Sport
1	R3	(Russia) Moscow Raceway, Volokolamsk	18 May		(Russia) Artem Severiukhin	(Russia) Kirill Kutskov (Note: Artem Severiukhin originally won the race but was given a 30 second time penalty for a false start.)	(Russia) Prima Racing
2	R4	(Russia) Igora Drive, Priozersk	14 June	(Russia) Yaroslav Shevyrtalov	(Russia) Anatoly Khavalkin	(Russia) Artem Severiukhin	(Russia) LADA Sport
2	R5	(Russia) Igora Drive, Priozersk	14 June	(Russia) Artem Severiukhin	(Russia) Artem Severiukhin	(Russia) Artem Severiukhin	(Russia) LADA Sport
2	R6	(Russia) Igora Drive, Priozersk	15 June		(Russia) Yaroslav Shevyrtalov	(Russia) Artem Severiukhin (Note: Kirill Kutskov originally won the race but was given a 1 second time penalty for forcing another driver off the track.)	(Russia) LADA Sport
3	R7	(Russia) NRING Circuit, Bogorodsk	12 July	(Russia) Yaroslav Shevyrtalov	(Russia) Yaroslav Shevyrtalov	(Russia) Yaroslav Shevyrtalov	(Russia) LADA Sport
3	R8	(Russia) NRING Circuit, Bogorodsk	12 July	(Russia) Yaroslav Shevyrtalov	(Russia) Yaroslav Shevyrtalov	(Russia) Ivan Pigaev	(Russia) ITECO Racing Team
3	R9	(Russia) NRING Circuit, Bogorodsk	13 July		(Russia) Vladislav Ryabov	(Russia) Egor Stepanov-Kim	(Russia) G-Drive Racing SMP Racing
4	R10	(Russia) Moscow Raceway, Volokolamsk	16 August	(Russia) Egor Nosov	(Russia) Artem Severiukhin	(Russia) Artem Severiukhin	(Russia) LADA Sport
4	R11	(Russia) Moscow Raceway, Volokolamsk	16 August	(Russia) Artem Severiukhin	(Russia) Artem Severiukhin	(Russia) Artem Severiukhin	(Russia) LADA Sport
4	R12	(Russia) Moscow Raceway, Volokolamsk	17 August		(Russia) Artem Severiukhin	(Russia) Artem Severiukhin	(Russia) LADA Sport
5	R13	(Russia) Kazan Ring, Kazan	12 September	(Russia) Vladimir Verkholantsev	(Russia) Artem Severiukhin	(Russia) Artem Severiukhin	(Russia) LADA Sport
5	R14	(Russia) Kazan Ring, Kazan	13 September	(Russia) Egor Nosov	(Russia) Artem Severiukhin	(Russia) Artem Severiukhin	(Russia) LADA Sport
5	R15	(Russia) Kazan Ring, Kazan	14 September		(Russia) Vladimir Verkholantsev	(Russia) Vladimir Verkholantsev	Formula K Russia
6	R16	(Russia) Fort Grozny Autodrom, Grozny	10 October	(Russia) Egor Nosov	(Russia) Marko Markozov	(Russia) Marko Markozov (Note: Egor Nosov originally won the race but was given a 30 second time penalty for a false start.)	Formula K Russia
6	R17	(Russia) Fort Grozny Autodrom, Grozny	11 October	(Russia) Yaroslav Shevyrtalov	(Russia) Yaroslav Shevyrtalov	(Russia) Yaroslav Shevyrtalov	(Russia) LADA Sport
6	R18	(Russia) Fort Grozny Autodrom, Grozny	12 October		(Russia) Yaroslav Shevyrtalov	(Russia) Ivan Pigaev	(Russia) ITECO Racing Team

=== Championship standings ===
Qualifying points

Points are awarded to the top five fastest drivers in qualifying.

Position	**1st**	**2nd**	**3rd**	**4th**	**5th**
Points	10	5	3	2	1

Race points

Points are awarded to the top fifteen classified finishers. Driver has to complete at least 75% of the race distance to be classified. Bonus point is awarded to the driver who set the fastest lap. The final classifications is obtained by summing up the scores on the 5 best results obtained during each of R1, R2 and R3 (15 races total). Races where driver was disqualified are not eligible for exclusion.

Position	**1st**	**2nd**	**3rd**	**4th**	**5th**	**6th**	**7th**	**8th**	**9th**	**10th**	**11th**	**12th**	**13th**	**14th**	**15th**	**FL**
Points	25	20	16	13	11	10	9	8	7	6	5	4	3	2	1	1

==== Drivers' Championship ====
Pos	Driver	MRA1			IGO			NRG			MRA2			KZR			FGA			Pts (Note: The final classifications is obtained by summing up the scores on the 5 best results obtained during each of R1, R2 and R3 (15 races total). Numbers without parentheses are championship points; numbers in parentheses are total points scored.)
Pos	Driver	R1	R2	R3	R1	R2	R3	R1	R2	R3	R1	R2	R3	R1	R2	R3	R1	R2	R3	Pts
1	(Russia) Yaroslav Shevyrtalov	**5**^{1}	4^{2}	2	**2**^{1}	3^{3}	4	**1**^{1}	**2**^{1}	4	3^{4}	2^{2}	6	(5)	(11)	(10)	4^{5}	**1**^{1}	6	323
2	(Russia) Artem Severiukhin	14^{3}†	1^{3}	9	1^{2}	**1**^{1}	1				1^{2}	**1**^{1}	1	1^{3}	1^{4}	2				303
3	(Russia) Egor Nosov	(11)^{5}	2^{4}	3	7^{5}	6^{5}	3	5	(6)	3	**2**^{1}	5^{5}	4	3^{2}	**2**^{1}	5	**10**^{1}	4^{5}	(8)	250
4	(Russia) Vladimir Verkholantsev	(12)	5	6	4	(8)	(8)	7	3^{2}	6	7^{3}	4^{4}	5	**2**^{1}	5^{5}	1	2^{3}	2^{2}	3	244
5	(Russia) Egor Stepanov-Kim	10	8^{5}	8	12	2^{2}	5	2^{4}	4	1	Ret	(8)	9	8^{5}	7^{2}	(11)	3^{4}	3^{3}	7	199
6	(Russia) Platon Kostin	DSQ^{2}	**Ret**^{1}	4	6	9	6	(8)	7^{3}	5	5^{5}	7	(7)	7	3^{3}	3	6	8	4	174
7	(Russia) Ivan Pigaev	6	7	7	5	7	10	9^{2}	1^{4}	4	(15)	(12)	(15)	10	10	7	7	6	1	171
8	(Russia) Vladislav Ryabov				8^{3}	5^{4}	15	3	5	12	6	3^{3}	3	12	8	6	5	5^{4}	2	168
9	(Russia) Kirill Kutskov	1^{4}	3	1	DSQ^{4}	4	2				4	6	2	6	12	13				163
10	(Russia) Marko Markozov	7	13	11	13	12	14	12^{3}	8	9	9	9	11				1^{2}	7	5	108
11	(Russia) Mikhail Kaurov	4	12	Ret	10	10	9	16†	9	Ret	8	10	10	11	(14)	9	9	11	9	94
12	(Russia) Mikhail Yushenkov	2	11	13	9	14	12	11	16†	10	10	16	13	(13)	9	Ret	11	9	13	83
13	(Russia) Matvey Sonkin	9	10	10	11	13	13	4^{5}	13	Ret	12	14	12	9	4	Ret				77
14	(Russia) Anatoly Khavalkin				DSQ	11	7	6	15^{5}	7	11	11	8	4^{4}	13	12				75
15	(Russia) Gerasim Skulanov				3	15	11	10	14	8	14	13	14	14	6	4				70
16	(Russia) Ivan Ovsienko	3	6	5																37
17	(Russia) Andrey Sizov							14	10	11							13	13	10	25
18	(Russia) Timur Shagaliev										13	15	16	15	Ret	Ret	8	10	12	23
19	(Russia) Stepan Antonov	8	9	12																19
20	(Russia) Roman Sharapov																12	12	11	13
21	(Russia) Sergey Peshkov				14	16	16	13	11	13										13
22	(Russia) Marat Knyazev													16	15	8				9
23	(Russia) Kirill Klestov							15	12	14										7
24	(Russia) German Foteev	13	14	14																7
Pos	Driver	R1	R2	R3	R1	R2	R3	R1	R2	R3	R1	R2	R3	R1	R2	R3	R1	R2	R3	Pts
Pos	Driver	MRA1			IGO			NRG			MRA2			KZR			FGA			Pts

Colour	Result
Gold	Winner
Silver	Second place
Bronze	Third place
Green	Points classification
Blue	Non-points classification
Blue	Non-classified finish (NC)
Purple	Retired, not classified (Ret)
Red	Did not qualify (DNQ)
Red	Did not pre-qualify (DNPQ)
Black	Disqualified (DSQ)
White	Did not start (DNS)
White	Withdrew (WD)
White	Race cancelled (C)
Blank	Did not practice (DNP)
Blank	Did not arrive (DNA)
Blank	Excluded (EX)

**Bold** – Pole
Italics – Fastest Lap
† — Did not finish, but classified

== Winter series ==
=== Drivers ===
Team	No.	Driver	Class	Rounds
(Russia) ITECO Racing Team	11	(Russia) Maksim Orlov		1–2
(Russia) ITECO Racing Team	27	(Russia) Timur Shagaliev		All
(Russia) ITECO Racing Team	79	(Russia) Ivan Ovsienko		3
Formula K Russia	17	(Russia) Ilya Dunin		3
Formula K Russia	19	(Russia) Egor Stepanov-Kim		All
Formula K Russia	29	(Israel) Ariel Elkin		2
Formula K Russia	33	(Russia) Lev Guba	**M**	2
Formula K Russia	62	(Russia) Roman Chamkin	**M**	2
Formula K Russia	73	(Russia) Marko Markozov		All
Formula K Russia	74	(Russia) Vladimir Verkholantsev		All
Formula K Russia	78	(Russia) Tatiana Alekseeva	**M**	3
(Russia) NI racing	21	(Russia) Mikhail Yushenkov		All
(Russia) NI racing	55	(Russia) Pavel Abrosimov		2-3
(Russia) TEAMGARIS	35	(Russia) Sergey Sirotkin	**M** **G**	2
(Russia) TEAMGARIS	77	(Russia) David Pogosyan	**M**	2
(Russia) LADA Sport	97	(Russia) Platon Kostin		1–2

Icon	Class
**M**	Drivers that compete in the Masters Class
**G**	Guest drivers ineligible for Drivers' Championship

=== Race calendar ===
On 16 September 2025 the calendar for the inaugural Winter Series was announced. All rounds are held as part of the Winter Circuit Series weekends at Sirius Autodrom which include events of Formula 4, Midjet and Shortcut race classes.

Round		Circuit	Date	Pole position	Fastest lap	Winning driver	Winning team	F4 Masters winner
1	R1	(Russia) Sirius Autodrom, Sochi	15 November	(Russia) Vladimir Verkholantsev	(Russia) Vladimir Verkholantsev	(Russia) Vladimir Verkholantsev	Formula K Russia	no participants
1	R2	(Russia) Sirius Autodrom, Sochi	16 November		(Russia) Egor Stepanov-Kim	(Russia) Platon Kostin	(Russia) LADA Sport	no participants
2	R3	(Russia) Sirius Autodrom, Sochi	5 December	(Israel) Ariel Elkin	(Russia) Vladimir Verkholantsev	(Russia) Timur Shagaliev (Note: Egor Stepanov-Kim originally won the race but was given a 10 second time penalty for a false start.)	(Russia) ITECO Racing Team	(Russia) David Pogosyan
2	R4	(Russia) Sirius Autodrom, Sochi	5 December		(Russia) Egor Stepanov-Kim	(Russia) Egor Stepanov-Kim	Formula K Russia	(Russia) David Pogosyan
2	R5	(Russia) Sirius Autodrom, Sochi	6 December	(Russia) Vladimir Verkholantsev	(Russia) Vladimir Verkholantsev	(Russia) Egor Stepanov-Kim	Formula K Russia	(Russia) David Pogosyan
2	R6	(Russia) Sirius Autodrom, Sochi	6 December		(Israel) Ariel Elkin	(Israel) Ariel Elkin	Formula K Russia	(Russia) David Pogosyan (Note: Sergey Sirotkin was the highest finisher among F4 Masters participants but was ineligible for points since he competed as a guest driver.)
3	R7	(Russia) Sirius Autodrom, Sochi	24 January	(Russia) Egor Stepanov-Kim	(Russia) Marko Markozov	(Russia) Mikhail Yushenkov (Note: Egor Stepanov-Kim originally won the race but was given a 30 second time penalty for a pre-start procedure infringement.)	(Russia) NI racing	no participants
3	R8	(Russia) Sirius Autodrom, Sochi	24 January		(Russia) Vladimir Verkholantsev	(Russia) Vladimir Verkholantsev	Formula K Russia	no participants
3	R9	(Russia) Sirius Autodrom, Sochi	25 January	(Russia) Timur Shagaliev	(Russia) Timur Shagaliev	(Russia) Timur Shagaliev (Note: Vladimir Verkholantsev originally won the race but was given a 10 second time penalty for a false start.)	(Russia) ITECO Racing Team	no finishers
3	R10	(Russia) Sirius Autodrom, Sochi	25 January		(Russia) Marko Markozov	(Russia) Egor Stepanov-Kim	Formula K Russia	no finishers

=== Championship standings ===
Qualifying points

Points are awarded to the top five fastest drivers in qualifying.

Position	**1st**	**2nd**	**3rd**	**4th**	**5th**
Points	10	5	3	2	1

Race points

Points are awarded to the top fifteen classified finishers. Driver has to complete at least 75% of the race distance to be classified. Bonus point is awarded to the driver who set the fastest lap. All results except two worst ones are counted towards the championship. Races where driver was disqualified are not eligible for exclusion.

==== Race 1 ====
Position	**1st**	**2nd**	**3rd**	**4th**	**5th**	**6th**	**7th**	**8th**	**9th**	**10th**	**11th**	**12th**	**13th**	**14th**	**15th**	**FL**
Points	25	20	16	13	11	10	9	8	7	6	5	4	3	2	1	1

==== Race 2 ====
Position	**1st**	**2nd**	**3rd**	**4th**	**5th**	**6th**	**7th**	**8th**	**9th**	**10th**	**11th**	**12th**	**13th**	**14th**	**15th**	**FL**
Points	20	17	15	13	11	10	9	8	7	6	5	4	3	2	1	1

==== Drivers' Championship ====
Pos	Driver	SOC		SOC				SOC				Pts (Note: All results except two worst ones are counted towards the championship. Numbers without parentheses are championship points; numbers in parentheses are total points scored.)
Pos	Driver	R1	R2	R1	R2	R3	R4	R1	R2	R3	R4	Pts
F4 Championship
1	(Russia) Vladimir Verkholantsev	**1**^{1}	(3)	3	2	**2**^{1}	3	(4)^{3}	1	2^{2}	2	182
2	(Russia) Egor Stepanov-Kim	2^{2}	(4)	(4)^{3}	1	1^{2}	2	**3**^{1}	2	3	1	175
3	(Russia) Timur Shagaliev	4^{5}	2	1^{2}	4	5	Ret	(6)^{2}	3	**1**^{1}	3	156
4	(Russia) Marko Markozov	(5)^{4}	7	2^{4}	3	3^{4}	(8)	5^{4}	4	5^{4}	4	120
5	(Russia) Mikhail Yushenkov	(7)	5	6	(7)	6	6	1	5	4^{5}	5	102
6	(Russia) Platon Kostin	3^{3}	1	5^{5}	5	4^{5}	4					89
7	(Russia) Pavel Abrosimov			8	8	8	7	7	7	8	7	68
8	(Russia) Maksim Orlov	6	6	7	6	7	5					59
9	(Russia) Ivan Ovsienko							2	8	6^{3}	6	51
10	(Russia) Ilya Dunin							8^{5}	6	7	8	36
11	(Israel) Ariel Elkin			**DNS**^{1}	DNS	DNS^{3}	1					34
F4 Master Championship
1	(Russia) David Pogosyan			**1**^{1}	1	**1**^{1}	2					114
2	(Russia) Roman Chamkin			2^{2}	2	DSQ^{2}	4					62
3	(Russia) Lev Guba			DNS	DNS	2^{3}	3					40
—	(Russia) Tatiana Alekseeva									DNS	DSQ	—
Guest drivers ineligible to score points
—	(Russia) Sergey Sirotkin						1					—
Pos	Driver	R1	R2	R1	R2	R3	R4	R1	R2	R3	R4	Pts
Pos	Driver	SOC		SOC				SOC				Pts

Colour	Result
Gold	Winner
Silver	Second place
Bronze	Third place
Green	Points classification
Blue	Non-points classification
Blue	Non-classified finish (NC)
Purple	Retired, not classified (Ret)
Red	Did not qualify (DNQ)
Red	Did not pre-qualify (DNPQ)
Black	Disqualified (DSQ)
White	Did not start (DNS)
White	Withdrew (WD)
White	Race cancelled (C)
Blank	Did not practice (DNP)
Blank	Did not arrive (DNA)
Blank	Excluded (EX)

**Bold** – Pole
Italics – Fastest Lap
† — Did not finish, but classified

Sirotkin finished sixth overall in his only race.
