= 2022 Russian Circuit Racing Series =

Circuit Racing Series

The 2022 SMP Russian Circuit Racing Series was the ninth season of the Russian Circuit Racing Series, organized by SMP Racing. It is the eighth season with TCR class cars. In 2022, the competition was held in eight classes: Touring, Touring Light, Super Production, S1600, GT4, CN, Historic LADA Cup and Time Attack Unlimited.

== Teams and drivers ==
Yokohama is the official tyre supplier.

=== Touring / TCR Russian Touring Car Championship ===
Team	Car	No.	Drivers	Rounds
(Russia) STK TAIF Motorsport	Audi RS3 LMS TCR	4	(Russia) Dmitry Bragin	All (6)
(Russia) STK TAIF Motorsport	Audi RS3 LMS TCR	17	(Russia) Pavel Kalmanovich	All
(Russia) LADA Sport Rosneft	LADA Vesta NG TCR	11	(Russia) Kirill Ladygin	All
(Russia) LADA Sport Rosneft	LADA Vesta NG TCR	12	(Russia) Vladimir Sheshenin	2—6
(Russia) LADA Sport Rosneft	LADA Vesta NG TCR	30	(Russia) Mikhail Mityaev	All
(Russia) Carrville Racing	Hyundai i30 N TCR	25	(Russia) Maksim Soldatov	1—4
(Russia) Carrville Racing	Audi RS3 LMS TCR	13	(Russia) Vasily Gryazin	1—3, 5
(Russia) VRC Team	Audi RS3 LMS TCR	21	(Russia) Roman Sharapov	2—5
(Russia) Lukoil Racing Team	Hyundai i30 N TCR	19	(Russia) Zakhar Slutskiy	All
(Russia) Lukoil Racing Team	Hyundai i30 N TCR	91	(Russia) Artem Slutskiy	All
(Russia) Lukoil Racing Team	Audi RS3 LMS TCR	50	(Russia) Egor Orudzhev	All
(Russia) RUMOS Racing	Hyundai i30 N TCR	47	(Russia) Lev Tolkachev	All
(Russia) A.M.G. Motorsport	LADA Vesta Sport TCR	78	(Russia) Egor Fokin	1—5

Key
Teams claimed for team points.

=== Super Production ===
All teams and drivers are Russian-registered.

Team	Car	No.	Drivers	Rounds
Balashikha DOSAAF	Honda Civic EP3	7	Vladimir Strelchenko	4—5
LADA Sport Rosneft	LADA Vesta NG	8	Ivan Chubarov	All (6)
LADA Sport Rosneft	LADA Vesta NG	53	Leonid Panfilov	All
Sofit Racing Team	Subaru BRZ	18	Ekaterina Boyarinova	All
Sofit Racing Team	Subaru BRZ	44	Samvel Iskoyants	All
Sofit Racing Team	Subaru BRZ	51	Irina Sidorkova	All
Sofit Racing Team	Subaru BRZ	51	Pavel Pastushkov	5
NEVA Motorsport	Honda Civic EP3	33	Roman Golikov	All
MEPhi RHHCC Racing Team	Volkswagen Scirocco	80	Aleksandr Garmash	1, 3–6
MEPhi RHHCC Racing Team	Volkswagen Scirocco	444	Sergey Gorbatenko	2, 4–5
MEPhi RHHCC Racing Team	Honda Civic EP3	88	Hikolay Vikhanskiy	All

Key
Teams claimed for team points.

=== Touring Light ===
All teams and drivers are Russian-registered.

Team	Car	No.	Drivers	Rounds
YUKA Team	Hyundai Solaris	7	Aleksandr Salnikov	1—2, 4–5
YUKA Team	Hyundai Solaris	66	Aleksey Savin	1—2, 4–5
LADA Sport Rosneft	LADA Granta	10	Andrey Petukhov	1
LADA Sport Rosneft	LADA Granta	11	Vladimir Sheshenin	1
Rally Academy	Volkswagen Polo LB	12	Nikolay Karamyshev	All (5)
Rally Academy	Volkswagen Polo HB	17	Vladimir Cherevan	All
SpeedWay Ranch	Peugeot 208 R2	16	Tatiana Eliseeva	1—2
SpeedWay Ranch	Peugeot 208 R2	19	Rodion Shushakov	1, 5
B-Tuning Pro Racing	Volkswagen Polo HB	20	Artemy Melnikov	All
Dudarev Dmitry	Kia Rio X-Line	33	Dmitry Dudarev	All
FAS Motorsport	Volkswagen Polo HB	52	Nikita Galishev	1—2, 4–5
FAS Motorsport	Volkswagen Polo HB	89	Artem Fridman	1—2, 4–5
ICL Tutaev Team	Volkswagen Polo LB	49	Ivan Tverdokhlebov	5
ICL Tutaev Team	Hyundai Solaris	80	Oleg Kravtsov	All
Lukoil Racing Rally Academy	Volkswagen Polo HB	55	Petr Plotnikov	1—2
Lukoil Racing Rally Academy	Volkswagen Polo LB	55	Petr Plotnikov	4—6
Lukoil Racing Rally Academy	Volkswagen Polo LB	93	Andrey Maslennikov	All

Key
Teams claimed for team points.

=== S1600 ===
All teams and drivers are Russian-registered.

Team	Car	No.	Drivers	Rounds
ICL Tutaev Team	Hyundai Solaris	4	Samvel Iscoyants	4
ICL Tutaev Team	Hyundai Solaris	27	Vitaly Larionov	1—2
ICL Tutaev Team	Hyundai Solaris	28	Anvar Tutaev	3, 5
ICL Tutaev Team	Hyundai Solaris	49	Ivan Tverdokhlebov	1—4
ICL Tutaev Team	Kia Rio	54	Mikhail Pochenkov	1—2, 6
ICL Tutaev Team	Kia Rio	79	Aleksandr Pochenkov	3—4, 6
ShonX Motorsport	LADA Granta FL	10	Andrey Petukhov	4—5
AKHMAT Racing Team	Hyundai Solaris	18	Rustam Fatkhutdinov	All (6)
AKHMAT Racing Team	LADA Granta FL	56	Vasiliy Korablev	1—2
AKHMAT Racing Team	Kia Rio X-Line	56	Vasiliy Korablev	3—6
Volkov Artem	LADA Granta FL	21	Artem Volkov	2
Volkov Artem	Kia Rio	21	Artem Volkov	3—5
ALGA Motorsport	Kia Rio	24	Kirill Zinoviev	All
RUMOS Racing	Kia Rio X-Line	25	Daniil Harashun	All
RUMOS Racing	Kia Rio X-Line	32	Aleksandr Chachava	All
RUMOS Racing	Kia Rio X-Line	77	Ivan Ekelchik	4
Alliance Motors	Kia Rio	36	Evgenyi Ushmaev	3
Alliance Motors	LADA Granta FL	44	Ruslan Nafikov	3—4
Dralin Mikhail	LADA Granta FL	58	Mikhail Dralin	1—5
Innostage AG Team	Hyundai Solaris	70	Ilya Rodkin	All
Innostage AG Team	Kia Rio X-Line	78	Artem Antonov	All
Innostage AG Team	Kia Rio X-Line	88	Ilya Sidorov	1—5
Innostage AG Team	Kia Rio X-Line	100	Stanislav Novikov	1—5
Buyanov Alexey	Kia Rio	81	Timofey Buyanov	2
GTE Racing Team	LADA Granta FL	84	Filipp Tuponosov	1—4
GTE Racing Team	LADA Granta FL	96	Vasiliy Vladykin	1—5
GTE Racing Team	LADA Granta FL	97	Anton Nadeshkin	All
Ershikov Anatoliy	Kia Rio	99	Anatoliy Ershikov	4

Key
Teams claimed for team points.

=== GT4 ===
All teams and drivers are Russian-registered.

Team	Car	No.	Drivers	Rounds
Capital Racing Team	Mercedes-AMG GT4	5	Ivan Samarin	6
Capital Racing Team	Mercedes-AMG GT4	15	Boris Shulmeyster	6
MotorSharks Capital Racing Team	Mercedes-AMG GT4	13	Denis Remenyako	2, 4–5
MotorSharks Capital Racing Team	Mercedes-AMG GT4	27	Vitaliy Larionov	6
MotorSharks Capital Racing Team	Mercedes-AMG GT4	83	Anton Nemkin	All (4)
Rally Academy	Porsche 718 Cayman GT4 Clubsport	7	Ilya Gorbatskiy	4—5
YADRO Motorsport	Mercedes-AMG GT4	8	Rinat Salikhov	2, 4–5
YADRO Motorsport	Mercedes-AMG GT4	44	Sergey Stolyarov	2, 4–5
VRC Team	Toyota Supra GT4	10	Alexey Denisov	4—5
Spora GT	Toyota Supra GT4	23	Eugeny Rumyantsev	4
Spora GT	Toyota Supra GT4	41	Aleksandr Vartanyan	5—6
Motorsport Promotion	BMW M4 GT4	26	Marat Khairov	4
ISKRA Motorsport	Porsche 718 Cayman GT4 Clubsport	37	Andrey Solukovtsev	2, 4–5
RSCar Motorsport	Porsche 718 Cayman GT4 Clubsport	46	Svetlana Gorbunova	2, 4–5
RSCar Motorsport	Mercedes-AMG GT4	61	Andrey Kremlev	2, 4–5
RSCar Motorsport	Mercedes-AMG GT4	63	Vadim Mescheryakov	2, 4–5
RSCar Motorsport	KTM X-Bow GT4	77	Andrey Goncharov	2, 5
Anastasiadis Dmitry	Toyota Supra GT4	47	Dmitry Anastasiadis	4—5
Pogosyan David	Toyota Supra GT4	74	David Pogosyan	2, 4–5
Ural Logistics VRT	Mercedes-AMG GT4	87	Danila Ivanov	2, 4–5
BMW Time	BMW M4 GT4	98	Oleg Semenov	2, 4–5

Key
Teams claimed for team points.

=== Sports prototype CN ===
Team	Car	No.	Drivers	Rounds
DOSAAF Motorsport School	Legends 600	5	Sergey Lapitskiy	5
Dobrynina Tatiana	Shortcut 527	7	Tatiana Dobrynina	All (4)
NRG Motorsport	Shortcut 527	8	Nikita Nikitin	5
NRG Motorsport	Shortcut 527	103	Aleksey Krylov	5
CSKA	Shortcut 527	10	Sergey Ievlev	All
CSKA	Shortcut 527	18	Sergey Peregudov	All
CSKA	Shortcut 527	73	Sergey Aglish	All
Chernov Aleksey	Shortcut 527	11	Aleksey Chernov	5
ArtLine Engineering	Legends EVO	12	Shota Abkhazava	1, 4–5
ArtLine Engineering	Legends EVO	22	Vitaliy Larionov	4
ArtLine Engineering	Legends EVO	31	Aleksey Khairov	All
ArtLine Engineering	Legends EVO	33	Georgiy Kudryavtsev	4—5
ArtLine Engineering	Legends EVO	47	Matevos Isaakyan	1
ArtLine Engineering	Legends EVO	78	Aleksandr Abkhazava	5
ArtLine Engineering	Legends EVO	221	Artem Kabakov	All
ArtLine Engineering	Legends 600	14	Pavel Gribov	5
ArtLine Engineering	Legends 600	58	Efim Lev	4—5
ArtLine Engineering	Legends 600	72	Vladimir Strelchenko	5
Balchug Racing Team	Shortcut 527	13	Kirill Dolenko	1, 4
Balchug Racing Team	Shortcut 527	16	Yuri Sunyaev	All
Balchug Racing Team	Shortcut 527	21	Kirill Kirakozov	All
Balchug Racing Team	Shortcut 527	130	Mikhail Loboda	5
ISKRA Motorsport	Shortcut 527	15	Amir Feyzulin	3—4
ISKRA Motorsport	Shortcut 527	25	Kirill Budovskiy	5
Gromov Vladislav	Shortcut 527	19	Andrey Gromov	All
Rumyantsev Evgeniy	Mitjet 2L	23	Evgeniy Rumyantsev	3
Krekoten Evgeniy	Mitjet 2L	27	Evgeniy Krekoten	1, 3–4
Blackthorn	Shortcut 527	30	Aleksandr Vinopal	All
Orekhov Sergey	Shortcut 527	55	Sergey Orekhov	All
Yachnich Nadezhda	Shortcut 527	57	Nadezhda Yachnich	4
Tlekhurai Temir	Shortcut 527	66	Temir Tlekhurai	4—5
Skorik Maksim	Shortcut 527	67	Maksim Skorik	All
B-Tuning Pro Racing Team	Shortcut 527	69	Stepan Krumilov	1, 4–5
Goncharov Andrey	Shortcut 527	71	Andrey Goncharov	4
Dostavalov Mikhail	Shortcut 527	77	Mikhail Dostavalov	All
Viktorov Artem	Shortcut 527	88	Artem Viktorov	All
Eliseev Dmitry	Shortcut 527	96	Dmitry Eliseev	All
ICL Tutaev Team	Shortcut 527	113	Denis Karelin	All

=== SMP LADA Historic Touring Cup ===
Team	Car	No.	Drivers	Class	Rounds
Semenov Gleb	VAZ 2101	9	Gleb Semenov	A5	4
Tashaev Igor	VAZ 2101	12	Igor Tashaev	A5	4
Rally Academy	VAZ 21013	17	Vladimir Cherevan	A5	All (3)
Kramar Motorsport	IZH 412	19	Denis Mysachev	Moskvich 2000	4
Kramar Motorsport	VAZ 2101	67	Sergey Seregin	A1	All
Kramar Motorsport	VAZ 2101	74	Igor Shunailov	A1	All
Kramar Motorsport	VAZ 2101	171	Dmitry Korolev	A5	4
Tarakanov Ivan	VAZ 2107	26	Ivan Tarakanov	A1	All
Legacy Motorsport	IZH 412	28	Mikhail Zasadych	Moskvich 2000	4
Legacy Motorsport	IZH 27151	43	Vladislav Shevel	Moskvich 2000	4
Legacy Motorsport	Moskvich 408IE	77	Vladislav Donets	Moskvich 2000	4
Legacy Motorsport	Moskvich 408IE	80	Dmitry Kozlov	Moskvich 2000	4
Tseplyaev Pavel	VAZ 2101	29	Pavel Tseplyaev	A5	1
Kozlov Andrey	VAZ 2107	33	Andrey Kozlov	A1	All
Artyushin Andrey	VAZ 21013	54	Andrey Artyushin	A5	All
Kutyaev Alexey	VAZ 2105	79	Alexey Kutyaev	A1	4
Tsygankov Andrey	VAZ 21074	81	Andrey Tsygankov	A1	All
Agnivin Vladislav	VAZ 2105	567	Vladislav Agnivin	A5	5

=== SMP Time Attack Unlim ===
Team	Car	No.	Drivers	Rounds
Innostage AG Team	Mitsubishi Lancer Evo9	8	Vladimir Gorlach	All (3)
Dudarev Dmitry	Mitsubishi Lancer Evo9	33	Dmitry Dudarev	2
Brutsky Dmitry	SEAT Leon Cupra	71	Dmitry Brutsky	4
Pismarov Eugeny	Porsche 718 Cayman GT4 Clubsport	444	Eugeny Pismarov	4—5

== Calendar and results ==
The first version of the schedule was announced on January 26, 2022, and included eight events, four of which were to be held in a two-weekend format. On March 23, 2022, a modified schedule is presented that includes four events and all events scheduled to be held in Russia. The final version of the calendar is presented on April 15 and includes five rounds.

Rnd.	Circuit	Date	Touring winner	SP winner	TL winner	S1600 winner	GT4 winner	CN winners	HC winners	TA winners
1	Smolensk Ring, Smolensk	10–12 June	R1: Egor Orudzhev; R2: Kirill Ladygin	R1: Leonid Panfilov; R2: Leonid Panfilov	R1: Andrey Maslennikov; R2: Andrey Maslennikov	R1: Rustam Fatkhutdinov; R2: Rustam Fatkhutdinov	not held	R1: Shortcut: Sergey Ievlev; Legends: Shota Abkhazava; Mitjet: Evgeniy Krekoten; R2: Shortcut: Stepan Krumilov; Legends: Matevos Isaakyan; Mitjet: Evgeniy Krekoten	R1: A5: Andrey Artyushin; A1: Andrey Kozlov; R2: A5: Vladimir Cherevan; A1: Andrey Kozlov	not held
2	NRING Circuit, Bogorodsk	8–10 July	R1: Egor Orudzhev; R2: Zakhar Slutsky	R1: Samvel Iskoyants; R2: Irina Sidorkova	R1: Nikolay Karamyshev; R2: Artem Fridman	R1: Rustam Fatkhutdinov; R2: Artem Antonov	R1: Vadim Mescheryakov; R2: Vadim Mescheryakov; R3: Denis Remenyako	not held	not held	R1: Dmitry Dudarev; R2: Dmitry Dudarev
3	Kazan Ring, Kazan	30–31 July	R1: Kirill Ladygin; R2: Lev Tolkachev	R1: Roman Golykov; R2: Roman Golykov	not held	R1: Rustam Fatkhutdinov; R2: Daniil Kharashun	not held	R1: Shortcut: Sergey Ievlev; Legends: Artem Kabakov; Mitjet: Evgeniy Rumyantsev; R2: Shortcut: Sergey Ievlev; Legends: Artem Kabakov; Mitjet: Evgeniy Rumyantsev	not held	not held
4	Moscow Raceway, Volokolamsk	19–21 August	R1: Pavel Kalmanovich; R2: Artem Slutsky	R1: Roman Golykov; R2: Ivan Chubarov	R1: Nikolay Karamyshev; R2: Artem Fridman	R1: Rustam Fatkhutdinov; R2: Ilya Sidorov	R1: Denis Remenyako; R2: Denis Remenyako; R3: Vadim Mescheryakov	R1: Shortcut: Stepan Krumilov; Legends: Artem Kabakov; Mitjet: Evgeniy Krekoten; R2: Shortcut: Artem Viktorov; Legends: Artem Kabakov; Mitjet: Evgeniy Krekoten	R1: A5: Andrey Artyushin; A1: Andrey Kozlov; M2000: Vladislav Shevel; R2: A5: Vladimir Cherevan; A1: Andrey Kozlov; M2000: Denis Mysachev	R1: Dmitry Brutsky; R2: Dmitry Brutsky
5	Igora Drive, Priozersk	9–11 September	R1: Dmitry Bragin; R2: Kirill Ladygin	R1: Samvel Iskoyants; R2: Ivan Chubarov	R1: Petr Plotnikoov; R2: Nikolay Karamyshev	R1: Artem Antonov; R2: Rustam Fatkhutdinov	R1: Aleksandr Vartanyan; R2: Aleksandr Vartanyan; R3: Anton Nemkin	R1: Shortcut: Sergey Ievlev; Legends: Aleksandr Abkhazava; R2: Shortcut: Mikhail Loboda; Legends: Aleksandr Abkhazava	R1: A5: Vladimir Cherevan; A1: Andrey Kozlov; R2: A5: Vladimir Cherevan; A1: Andrey Kozlov	R1: Vladimir Gorlach; R2: Vladimir Gorlach
6	Fort Grozny; Grozny	6–8 October	R1: Pavel Kalmanovich; R2: Dmitry Bragin	R1: Nikolay Vikhanskiy; R2: Irina Sidorkova	R1: Andrey Maslennikov; R2: Dmitry Dudarev	R1: Artem Antonov; R2: Rustam Fatkhutdinov	R1: Aleksandr Vartanyan; R2: Aleksandr Vartanyan; R3: Aleksandr Vartanyan	not held	not held	not held

== Championship standings ==
Scoring systems

Position	1st	2nd	3rd	4th	5th	6th	7th	8th	9th	10th	11th	12th	13th	14th	15th	PP	FL
Qualifacation	10	8	6	4	2												
Race 1 Points	30	24	19	16	14	12	10	8	7	6	5	4	3	2	1	**1**	1
Race 2 Points	25	20	16	13	11	10	9	8	7	6	5	4	3	2	1	**1**	1

=== Touring / TCR Russian Touring Car Championship ===
Pos.	Driver	SMO		NRG		KAZ		MSC		IGO		GRO		Pts.
1	(Russia) Dmitry Bragin	2	4	3	4	3	13	6	2	1	4	2	1	237
2	(Russia) Egor Orudzhev	1	8	**1**	6	4	8	**2**	10	4	8	**3**	8	226
3	(Russia) Kirill Ladygin	7	1	5	2	**1**	4	7	3	5	1	Ret	7	201
4	(Russia) Artem Slutskiy	3	7	2	7	7	5	8	1	7	3	4	3	195
5	(Russia) Pavel Kalmanovich	5	3	4	Ret	13	3	1	Ret	8	2	1	4	182
6	(Russia) Zakhar Slutskiy	**Ret**	Ret	6	1	5	11	3	6	2	6	5	2	168
7	(Russia) Mikhail Mityaev	4	9	9	3	6	7	5	5	11	12	8†	6	135
8	(Russia) Vladimir Sheshenin			11	5	2	6	12	4	6	5	6	5	129
9	(Russia) Egor Fokin	6	6	10	9	10	12	4	Ret	**3**	9			102
10	(Russia) Lev Tolkachev	7	10	Ret	11	12	1	11	7	9	11	7	9	94
11	(Russia) Maksim Soldatov	8	2	8	8	11	9	10	8					70
12	(Russia) Vasiliy Gryazin	9	5	Ret	10	9	10			10	7			58
13	(Russia) Roman Sharapov			7	12	8	2	9	9	DNS	10			57
Pos.	Driver	SMO		NRG		KAZ		MSC		IGO		GRO		Pts.

Colour	Result
Gold	Winner
Silver	Second place
Bronze	Third place
Green	Points classification
Blue	Non-points classification
Blue	Non-classified finish (NC)
Purple	Retired, not classified (Ret)
Red	Did not qualify (DNQ)
Red	Did not pre-qualify (DNPQ)
Black	Disqualified (DSQ)
White	Did not start (DNS)
White	Withdrew (WD)
White	Race cancelled (C)
Blank	Did not practice (DNP)
Blank	Did not arrive (DNA)
Blank	Excluded (EX)

**Bold** – Pole
Italics – Fastest Lap

† – Drivers did not finish the race, but were classified as they completed over 75% of the race distance.

==== Touring / TCR Russian Touring Car Championship Team's Standings ====
Pos.	Driver	SMO		NRG		KAZ		MSC		IGO		GRO		Pts.
1	(Russia) STK TAIF Motorsport	2	3	3	4	3	3	1	2	1	2	1	1	419
1	(Russia) STK TAIF Motorsport	5	4	4	Ret	13	13	6	Ret	8	4	2	4	419
2	(Russia) Lukoil Racing Team	1	8	1	1	4	8	2	6	2	6	3	2	394
2	(Russia) Lukoil Racing Team	**Ret**	Ret	6	6	5	11	3	10	4	8	8	5	394
3	(Russia) LADA Sport Rosneft	4	1	5	2	1	4	7	3	5	1	6	5	347
3	(Russia) LADA Sport Rosneft	7	9	9	3	2	6	12	4	11	12	Ret	7	347
4	(Russia) Carville Racing	8	2	8	8	9	9	9	8	10	7			142
4	(Russia) Carville Racing	9	5	Ret	10	11	10	9	10	DNS	10			142
Pos.	Driver	SMO		NRG		KAZ		MSC		IGO		GRO		Pts.

=== Super Production ===
Pos.	Driver	SMO		NRG		KAZ		MSC		IGO		GRO		Pts.
1	Ivan Chubarov	3	2	2	Ret	3	4	2	1	5	1	3	5	244
2	Samvel Iskoyants	4	Ret	**1**	Ret	2	2	4	6	1	2	**2**	4	238
3	Roman Golikov	**8**	6	3	4	1	1	**1**	3	3	3	8	DNS	237
4	Nikolay Vikhanskiy	5	4	4	3	**Ret**	5	6	4	**6**	4	1	3	209
5	Leonid Panfilov	1	1	6	2	6	3	10†	Ret	2	6	4	2	208
6	Irina Sidorkova	2	3	Ret	1	4	6	3	2	Ret	Ret	5	1	176
7	Ekaterina Boyarinova	7	DNS	5	5	5	Ret	5	7	DNS	9	7	6	105
8	Aleksandr Garmash	6	5			DNS	DNS	7	8	4	5	6	7	89
9	Sergey Gorbatenko			7	6			9	9	DNS	DNS			34
10	Vladimir Strelchenko							8	5	Ret	8			27
11	Pavel Pastushkov									7	7			19
Pos.	Driver	SMO		NRG		KAZ		MSC		IGO		GRO		Pts.

Colour	Result
Gold	Winner
Silver	Second place
Bronze	Third place
Green	Points classification
Blue	Non-points classification
Blue	Non-classified finish (NC)
Purple	Retired, not classified (Ret)
Red	Did not qualify (DNQ)
Red	Did not pre-qualify (DNPQ)
Black	Disqualified (DSQ)
White	Did not start (DNS)
White	Withdrew (WD)
White	Race cancelled (C)
Blank	Did not practice (DNP)
Blank	Did not arrive (DNA)
Blank	Excluded (EX)

**Bold** – Pole
Italics – Fastest Lap

† – Drivers did not finish the race, but were classified as they completed over 75% of the race distance.

==== Super Production Team's Standings ====
Pos.	Driver	SMO		NRG		KAZ		MSC		IGO		GRO		Pts.
1	LADA Sport Rosneft	1	1	2	2	3	3	2	1	2	1	3	2	452
1	LADA Sport Rosneft	3	2	6	Ret	6	4	10†	Ret	5	6	4	5	452
2	Sofit Racing Team	2	3	1	1	2	2	3	2	1	2	2	1	417
2	Sofit Racing Team	4	Ret	Ret	Ret	4	6	4	6	Ret	Ret	5	4	417
3	MEPhi RHHCC Racing Team	5	4	4	3	1	1	6	4	4	4	1	3	383
3	MEPhi RHHCC Racing Team	6	5	7	6	Ret	5	7	8	6	5	6	7	383
Pos.	Driver	SMO		NRG		KAZ		MSC		IGO		GRO		Pts.

=== Touring Light ===
Pos.	Driver	SMO		NRG		MSC		IGO		GRO		Pts.
1	Nikolay Karamyshev	2	6	**1**	3	**1**	DSQ	3	1	3	2	232
2	Andrey Maslennikov	**1**	1	3	10	3	DSQ	8	2	1	5	198
3	Petr Plotnikov	3	5	4	2	2	DSQ	1	3	5	3	191
4	Dmitriy Dudarev	9	8	6	5	8	4	**2**	4	**2**	1	177
5	Vladimir Cherevan	5	4	5	4	6	2	4	12	4	4	139
6	Artem Fridman	7	7	2	1	5	1	Ret	6			129
7	Aleksey Savin	Ret	Ret	9	6	4	5	10	7			72
8	Oleg Kravtsov	Ret	DNS	Ret	7	Ret	3	7	11	7	7	59
9	Aleksandr Salnikov	8	11†	8	8	7	Ret	6	8			59
10	Artemy Melnikov	Ret	10	11	DNS	9	Ret	5	DNS	6	6	54
11	Vladimir Sheshenin	4	2									38
12	Nikita Galishev	WD	WD	10	9	10	6	Ret	10			35
13	Andrey Petukhov	6	3									28
13	Tatiana Eliseeva	10	9	7	Ret							23
14	Rodion Shushakov	Ret	DNS					9	5			18
15	Ivan Tverdokhlebov							10	9			12
Pos.	Driver	SMO		NRG		MSC		IGO		GRO		Pts.

Colour	Result
Gold	Winner
Silver	Second place
Bronze	Third place
Green	Points classification
Blue	Non-points classification
Blue	Non-classified finish (NC)
Purple	Retired, not classified (Ret)
Red	Did not qualify (DNQ)
Red	Did not pre-qualify (DNPQ)
Black	Disqualified (DSQ)
White	Did not start (DNS)
White	Withdrew (WD)
White	Race cancelled (C)
Blank	Did not practice (DNP)
Blank	Did not arrive (DNA)
Blank	Excluded (EX)

**Bold** – Pole
Italics – Fastest Lap

† – Drivers did not finish the race, but were classified as they completed over 75% of the race distance.

==== Touring Light Team's Standings ====
Pos.	Driver	SMO		NRG		MSC		IGO		GRO		Pts.
1	Lukoil Racing Rally Academy	1	1	3	2	2	DSQ	1	2	1	3	381
1	Lukoil Racing Rally Academy	3	5	4	10	3	DSQ	3	8	5	5	381
2	Rally Academy	2	4	1	3	1	2	3	1	3	2	371
2	Rally Academy	5	6	5	4	6	DSQ	4	12	4	4	371
3	FAS Motorsport	7	7	2	1	5	1	Ret	6			164
3	FAS Motorsport	WD	WD	10	9	10	6	Ret	10			164
4	YUKA Team	8	11†	8	6	4	5	6	7			137
4	YUKA Team	Ret	Ret	9	8	7	Ret	10	8			137
5	LADA Sport Rosneft	4	2									66
5	LADA Sport Rosneft	6	3									66
Pos.	Driver	SMO		NRG		MSC		IGO		GRO		Pts.

=== S1600 ===
Pos.	Driver	SMO		NRG		KAZ		MSC		IGO		GRO		Pts.
1	Rustam Fatkhutdinov	1	1	**1**	7	**1**	3	1	6	14	1	**Ret**	1	278
3	Artem Antonov	3	10	6	1	8	8	**5**	16	1	Ret	1	4	201
3	Daniil Kharashun	2	4	2	Ret	2	1	6	15	7	4	2	Ret	177
4	Ilya Rodkin	5	Ret	7	4	3	7	4	17	**8**	2	3	8	167
5	Vasiliy Vladykin	4	3	9	2	9	5	2	14	3	5			147
6	Stanislav Novikov	16†	5	4	6	4	4	19	2	2	Ret			117
7	Vasiliy Korablev	11	Ret	12	13	6	6	14	5	Ret	9	9†	2	92
8	Kirill Zinoviev	14	11	Ret	12	Ret	9	10	3	6	DNS	4	3	90
9	Ilya Sidorov	9	8	8	8	14	17†	15	1	5	7			85
10	Mikhail Dralin	13	Ret	5	3	7	13	11	4	11	Ret			69
11	Aleksandr Chachava	15	9	10	9	10	15	17	10	12	8	7	7	65
12	Anton Nadeshkin	6	Ret	13	16	Ret	11	21†	8	9	10	6	5	64
13	Philipp Tuponosov	12	7	Ret	10	5	2	12	Ret					57
14	Vitaly Larionov	8	2	DSQ	11									41
15	Ivan Tverdokhlebov	**7**	12	Ret	DNS	11	14	13	12					40
16	Artem Volkov			11	15	15	18	7	Ret	10	3			39
17	Timofey Buyanov			3	5									38
18	Andrey Petukhov							8	7	13	6			30
19	Aleksandr Pochenkov					13	12	20	9			5	DSQ	28
20	Mikhail Pochenkov	10	6	DSQ	DNS							DSQ	6	27
21	Ivan Ekelchik							3	Ret					19
22	Anvar Tutaev					Ret	16†			4	Ret			16
23	Ruslan Nafikov					Ret	10	16	11					11
24	Samvel Iskoyants							9	Ret					7
25	Eugeny Ushmaev					12	Ret							4
26	Anatoliy Ershikov							18	13					3
Pos.	Driver	SMO		NRG		KAZ		MSC		IGO		GRO		Pts.

Colour	Result
Gold	Winner
Silver	Second place
Bronze	Third place
Green	Points classification
Blue	Non-points classification
Blue	Non-classified finish (NC)
Purple	Retired, not classified (Ret)
Red	Did not qualify (DNQ)
Red	Did not pre-qualify (DNPQ)
Black	Disqualified (DSQ)
White	Did not start (DNS)
White	Withdrew (WD)
White	Race cancelled (C)
Blank	Did not practice (DNP)
Blank	Did not arrive (DNA)
Blank	Excluded (EX)

**Bold** – Pole
Italics – Fastest Lap

† – Drivers did not finish the race, but were classified as they completed over 75% of the race distance.

==== S1600 Team's Standings ====
Pos.	Driver	SMO		NRG		KAZ		MSC		IGO		GRO		Pts.
1	Akhmat Racing Team	1	1	1	7	1	3	1	5	14	1	9†	1	372
1	Akhmat Racing Team	11	Ret	12	13	6	6	14	6	Ret	9	Ret	2	372
2	Innostage AG Team	3	10	6	1	3	4	4	16	2	2	1	4	367
2	Innostage AG Team	5	Ret	7	4	4	7	5	17	8	Ret	3	8	367
3	GTE Racing Team	4	3	9	2	5	2	2	14	3	5			209
3	GTE Racing Team	12	7	Ret	10	9	5	12	Ret	11	Ret			209
Pos.	Driver	SMO		NRG		KAZ		MSC		IGO		GRO		Pts.

=== SMP GT4 Russia ===
Pos.	Driver	NRG			MSC			IGO			GRO			Pts.
1	Anton Nemkin	7	3	2	2	3	6	5	5	1	2	2	2	238
2	Vadim Mescheryakov	1	1	8	**DSQ**	2	1	2	2	8				200
3	Aleksandr Vartanyan							**1**	1	2	**1**	1	1	192
4	Denis Remenyako	9	5	1	1	1	2	9	7	7				153
5	Sergey Stolyarov	**4**	2	4	13	6	14	3	4	4				140
6	Rinat Salikhov	2	11†	5	4	4	8	4	3	3				138
7	David Pogosyan	DNS	4	3	7	5	3	6	6	6				106
8	Danila Ivanov	3	10	10	3	9	4	7	12	5				99
9	Oleg Semenov	5	7	6	8	8	Ret	8	Ret	9				65
10	Andrey Solukovtsev	6	6	7	6	10	5	DNS	DNS	DNS				62
11	Vitaly Larionov										3	4	4	57
12	Ivan Samarin										4	4	3	50
13	Svetlana Gorbunova	10	8	9	10	12	13	11	10	13				48
14	Andrey Kremlev	11	9	11	Ret	13	12	15	11	12				34
15	Dmitry Anastasiadis				12	11	10	14	8	10				31
16	Eugeny Rumyantsev				9	7	9							30
17	Boris Shulmeyster										Ret	5	5	29
18	Ilya Gorbatsky				5	Ret	7	12	Ret	DNS				27
19	Aleksey Denisov				DNS	14	11	13	9	11				22
20	Andrey Goncharov	8	DNS	DNS				10	Ret	DNS				14
21	Marat Khairov				11	DNS	DNS							5
Pos.	Driver	NRG			MSC			IGO			GRO			Pts.

Colour	Result
Gold	Winner
Silver	Second place
Bronze	Third place
Green	Points classification
Blue	Non-points classification
Blue	Non-classified finish (NC)
Purple	Retired, not classified (Ret)
Red	Did not qualify (DNQ)
Red	Did not pre-qualify (DNPQ)
Black	Disqualified (DSQ)
White	Did not start (DNS)
White	Withdrew (WD)
White	Race cancelled (C)
Blank	Did not practice (DNP)
Blank	Did not arrive (DNA)
Blank	Excluded (EX)

**Bold** – Pole
Italics – Fastest Lap

† – Drivers did not finish the race, but were classified as they completed over 75% of the race distance.

==== SMP GT4 Russia Team's Standings ====
Pos.	Driver	NRG			MSC			IGO			GRO			Pts.
1	Motor Sharks Capital Racing Team	7	3	1	1	1	2	5	5	1	2	2	2	448
1	Motor Sharks Capital Racing Team	9	5	2	2	3	6	9	7	7	3	4	4	448
3	Yadro Motorsport	2	2	4	4	4	8	3	3	3				278
3	Yadro Motorsport	4	11†	5	13	6	14	4	4	4				278
3	RSCar Motorsport	1	1	8	**DSQ**	2	1	2	2	8				253
3	RSCar Motorsport	10	8	9	10	12	13	11	10	12				253
Pos.	Driver	NRG			MSC			IGO			GRO			Pts.
