= 2021 Russian Circuit Racing Series =

Motor racing season

The 2021 SMP Russian Circuit Racing Series was the eighth season of the Russian Circuit Racing Series, organized by SMP Racing. It was the seventh season with TCR class cars. In 2021, the competition was held in seven classes: Touring, Touring Light, Super Production, S1600, S1600 Junior, GT4 and CN.

== Teams and drivers ==
Yokohama was the official tyre supplier.

=== Touring / TCR Russian Touring Car Championship ===
Team	Car	No.	Drivers	Rounds
(Russia) TAIF Motorsport	Audi RS3 LMS TCR	4	(Russia) Dmitry Bragin	All
(Russia) TAIF Motorsport	Audi RS3 LMS TCR	89	(Russia) Timur Shigabutdinov	2, 5
(Russia) RUMOS Racing	Audi RS3 LMS TCR	5	(Russia) Eugeny Metsker	1—5, 6
(Russia) RUMOS Racing	Hyundai i30 N TCR	47	(Russia) Lev Tolkachev	All
(Russia) LADA Sport Rosneft	LADA Vesta Sport TCR	11	(Russia) Kirill Ladygin	All
(Russia) LADA Sport Rosneft	LADA Vesta Sport TCR	30	(Russia) Mikhail Mityaev	All
(Russia) Carville Racing	Audi RS3 LMS TCR	12	(Russia) Matvey Furazhkin	1—2
(Russia) Carville Racing	Audi RS3 LMS TCR	73	(Kazakhstan) Aleksandr Artemyev	3
(Russia) Carville Racing	Hyundai i30 N TCR	16	(Russia) Artem Slutskiy	6—7
(Russia) Carville Racing	Hyundai i30 N TCR	19	(Russia) Zakhar Slutskiy	All
(Russia) Carville Racing	Hyundai i30 N TCR	91	(Russia) Grigoriy Burlutskiy	All
(Russia) Innostage AG Team	CUPRA León TCR	17	(Russia) Pavel Kalmanovich	All
(Russia) Innostage AG Team	Audi RS3 LMS TCR	48	(Russia) Aidar Nuriev	1—5
(Latvia) LV Racing	Audi RS3 LMS TCR	21	(Latvia) Valter Zviedris	7
(Russia) Lukoil Racing Team	Audi RS3 LMS TCR	50	(Russia) Egor Orudzhev	All
(Russia) Lukoil Racing Team	Hyundai i30 N TCR	62	(Russia) Ivan Lukashevich	All
(Russia) Lukoil Racing Team	Hyundai i30 N TCR	71	(Russia) Andrey Maslennikov	All
(Russia) A.M.G. Motorsport	LADA Vesta Sport TCR	78	(Russia) Egor Fokin	All

Key
Teams claimed for team points.

=== Super Production ===
All teams and drivers are Russian-registered.

Team	Car	No.	Drivers	Rounds
DOSAAF Balashikha	Honda Civic	7	Vladimir Strelchenko	3, 7
LADA Sport Rosneft	LADA Vesta	10	Andrey Petukhov	All
LADA Sport Rosneft	LADA Vesta	37	Vladimir Sheshenin	All
LECAR Racing Team	LADA Vesta	52	Maksim Chernev	All
RHHCC Racing Team; ALAS	Honda Civic Type R	13	Igor Samsonov	1—4
RHHCC Racing Team; ALAS	Honda Civic Type R	88	Nikolay Vikhanskiy	All
RHHCC Racing Team; ALAS	Volkswagen Scirocco	54	Aleksandr Garmash	All
Boyarinova Racing Team	Mazda 3	18	Ekaterina Boyarinova	4—7
Sofit Racing Team	Subaru BRZ	22	Dmitry Lebedev	All
Sofit Racing Team	Subaru BRZ	44	Samvel Iskoyants	2—7
Sofit Racing Team	Subaru BRZ	77	Vadim Antipov	All
Sofit Racing Team	Subaru BRZ	78	Pavel Pastushkov	3—4
NEVA Motorsport	Honda Civic Type R	39	Yuri Arshanskiy	1—5, 7
Sergei Schegolev	LADA Granta Cup	41	Sergei Schegolev	All
GTE Racing Team	Mazda 3	96	Vasiliy Vladykin	1

Key
Teams claimed for team points.

=== Touring Light ===
All teams and drivers are Russian-registered.

Team	Car	No.	Drivers	Rounds
Ilsur Akhmetvaleev	Renault Twingo	4	Ilsur Akhmetvaleev	4—7
Aleksandr Salnikov	Hyundai Solaris	7	Aleksandr Salnikov	1—5, 7
LADA Sport Rosneft	LADA Granta	8	Ivan Chubarov	All
LADA Sport Rosneft	LADA Granta	11	Leonid Panfilov	All
Rally Academy	Volkswagen Polo	17	Vladimir Cherevan	All
Rally Academy	Volkswagen Polo	55	Petr Plotnikov	All
Speedway Ranch	Peugeot 208	27	Andrey Radoshnov	All
Speedway Ranch	Peugeot 208	73	Roman Golikov	All
Ravon Racing Team	Ravon Nexia R3	44	Ruslan Nafikov	1—3
Ravon Racing Team	Ravon Nexia R3	66	Aleksey Savin	1—3
Aleksey Savin	Hyundai Solaris	66	Aleksey Savin	4
B-Tuning Pro Racing	Hyundai Solaris	66	Aleksey Savin	5—7
B-Tuning Pro Racing	Volkswagen Polo	38	Kirill Zakharov	3—5
B-Tuning Pro Racing	Volkswagen Polo	83	Andrey Sevastianov	All
FAS-Motorsport	Volkswagen Polo	89	Artem Fridman	All

Key
Teams claimed for team points.

=== S1600 ===
All teams and drivers are Russian-registered except Thomas Jonsson.

Team	Car	No.	Drivers	Rounds
LADA Sport Rosneft	LADA Granta FL	5	Maksim Kadakov	1
LADA Sport Rosneft	LADA Granta FL	42	Manuchar Chapodze	4
LADA Sport Rosneft	LADA Granta FL	71	Dmitry Semenov	3
LADA Sport Rosneft	LADA Granta FL	99	Vadim Gagarin	2
Rally Academy	Volkswagen Polo Se	9	Ilya Gorbatsky	1, 3–5, 7
Rally Academy	Volkswagen Polo Se	72	Vitaly Larionov	All
Innostage AG Team	Hyundai Solaris	90	Artem Antonov	7
Innostage AG Team	Kia Rio X-Line	10	Stanislav Novikov	All
Innostage AG Team	Kia Rio X-Line	20	Egor Sanin	2—7
Innostage AG Team	Kia Rio	20	Egor Sanin	1
Innostage AG Team	Kia Rio	22	Thomas Jonsson	3, 5, 7
AG Team	Kia Rio	70	Ilya Rodkin	All
AG Team	Hyundai Solaris	30	Nikita Dubinin	All
SHONX Motorsport	LADA Granta FL	13	Ilya Sidorov	3
SHONX Motorsport	LADA Granta FL	69	Ivan Kazarin	3
SHONX Motorsport	LADA Granta FL	78	Dmitry Kazarin	3
Lev Yuditsky	LADA Kalina	14	Lev Yuditsky	2
Roman Shusharin	Kia Rio	15	Roman Shusharin	1—3
Tatiana Eliseeva	Kia Rio	16	Tatiana Eliseeva	2—5
Akhmat Racing Team 1 Akhmat Racing Team 2	Hyundai Solaris	18	Rustam Fatkhutdinov	All
Akhmat Racing Team 1 Akhmat Racing Team 2	Kia Rio	44	Ruslan Nafikov	6
Akhmat Racing Team 1 Akhmat Racing Team 2	Kia Rio	54	Marat Knyazev	2
Akhmat Racing Team 1 Akhmat Racing Team 2	Kia Rio	56	Vasily Korablev	1
Akhmat Racing Team 1 Akhmat Racing Team 2	Kia Rio X-Line	56	Vasily Korablev	2—7
Akhmat Racing Team 1 Akhmat Racing Team 2	Volkswagen Polo Se	63	Jabrail Akhmadov	1—5
Akhmat Racing Team 1 Akhmat Racing Team 2	LADA Granta FL	95	Mikhail Grachev	All
DM Racing	LADA Kalina NFR R1	21	Artem Volkov	2—4
RUMOS Racing	Kia Rio X-Line	32	Aleksandr Chachava	All
RUMOS Racing	Kia Rio X-Line	50	Boris Shulmeister	All
RUMOS Racing	Kia Rio	2	Efim Gantmakher	7
Bragin Racing Team	Kia Rio	2	Efim Gantmakher	6
Bragin Racing Team	Kia Rio	41	Ilya Yekushevsky	1—5
Bragin Racing Team	Kia Rio X-Line	12	Mikhail Simonov	1—6
Aleksandr Vinopal	Kia Rio	25	Aleksandr Vinopal	5
Samvel Iskoyants	Kia Rio	28	Samvel Iskoyants	5
Dmitry Dudarev	Kia Rio X-Line	33	Dmitry Dudarev	All
Viktor Kotov	LADA Kalina	46	Viktor Kotov	2
Yaroslava Kopytina	KIA Rio	46	Yaroslava Kopytina	5
Tutaev Team	Hyundai Solaris	49	Ivan Tverdokhlebov	All
Tutaev Team	Kia Rio	80	Oleg Kravtsov	All
Mikhail Dralin	LADA Granta FL	58	Mikhail Dralin	All
GTE Racing Team	LADA Granta FL	74	David Pogosyan	All
GTE Racing Team	LADA Granta FL	84	Philipp Tuponosov	All
GTE Racing Team	LADA Granta FL	96	Vasily Vladykin	All
Anatoly Ershikov	LADA Kalina	77	Anatoly Ershikov	1, 3—4
Mikhail Dyachenko	LADA Kalina	88	Mikhail Dyachenko	1—4

Key
Teams claimed for team points.

=== S1600 Junior ===
All teams and drivers are Russian-registered.

Team	Car	No.	Drivers	Rounds
RUMOS Racing	Volkswagen Polo Sedan	12	Nikolay Kalinin	All (5)
RUMOS Racing	Volkswagen Polo Sedan	82	Mark Metsker	All
UMMC Motorsport	Volkswagen Polo Sedan	13	Stepan Anufriev	1—4
Aleksey Buyanov	Volkswagen Polo Sedan	18	Timofey Buyanov	All
B-Tuning Pro Racing	Volkswagen Polo Sedan	19	Konstantin Dubensky	4—5
Carville Racing	Volkswagen Polo Sedan	53	Mark Novikov	3
Rally Academy	Volkswagen Polo Sedan	51	Artemy Pershin	1, 3—4
Innostage AG Team	Volkswagen Polo Sedan	78	Artem Antonov	All

Key
Teams claimed for team points.

=== GT4 ===
All teams and drivers are Russian-registered.

Team	Car	No.	Drivers	Rounds
Aleksandr Maslennikov	KTM X-Bow GT4 Evo	11	Aleksandr Maslennikov	1, 3, 7
Capital Racing Team Motor Sharks	Mercedes-AMG GT4	13	Denis Remenyako	All
Capital Racing Team Motor Sharks	Mercedes-AMG GT4	83	Anton Nemkin	All
A.M.G. Motorsport	BMW M4 GT4	26	Marat Khairov	All
RSCar Motorsport	Porsche 718 Cayman GT4 Clubsport	28	Artem Soloviev	2
RSCar Motorsport	Porsche 718 Cayman GT4 Clubsport	46	Svetlana Gorbunova	4—5
RSCar Motorsport	Porsche 718 Cayman GT4 Clubsport	61	Andrei Kremlev	1, 3—4
RSCar Motorsport	Mercedes-AMG GT4	63	Vadim Mescheryakov	All
Iskra Motorsport	Porsche 718 Cayman GT4 Clubsport	37	Andrey Solukovtsev	All
Wicked Speed Racing	Mercedes-AMG GT4	88	Aleksandr Vaintrub	1
Yadro Motorsport	Mercedes-AMG GT4	88	Aleksandr Vaintrub	2—7
Yadro Motorsport	Mercedes-AMG GT4	44	Sergei Stolyarov	All
Yadro Motorsport	KTM X-Bow GT4 Evo	77	Andrey Goncharov	1
Andrey Goncharov	KTM X-Bow GT4 Evo	77	Andrey Goncharov	2—7
Danila Ivanov	Mercedes-AMG GT4	87	Danila Ivanov	7

Key
Teams claimed for team points.

=== Sports prototype CN ===
All teams and drivers are Russian-registered.

Team	Car	No.	Drivers	Rounds
Aleksandr Nazarov	Legends CAR	5	Aleksandr Nazarov	3
NRG Motorsport	Shortcut	6	Mikhail Mikhin	3
NRG Motorsport	Shortcut	40	Sergei Aglish	1, 3
Tatiana Dobrynina	Shortcut	7	Tatiana Dobrynina	All (4)
Artem Viktorov	Shortcut	8	Artem Viktorov	1—3
Ivan Pugachev	Shortcut	9	Ivan Pugachev	All
CSKA	Shortcut	10	Sergey Ievlev	All
Aleksandr Chernyak	Shortcut	11	Aleksandr Chernyak	1—3
ArtLine Technology	Legends EVO	12	Shota Abkhazava	3—4
ArtLine Technology	Legends EVO	31	Aleksey Khairov	All
ArtLine Technology	Legends EVO	73	Daniil Shapka	3—4
ArtLine Technology	Legends 600	73	Daniil Shapka	2
ArtLine Technology	Legends 600	58	Efim Lev	2—4
ArtLine Technology	Legends 600	72	Vladimir Strelchenko	3
ArtLine Technology	Legends 600	77	Pavel Gribov	3
Kirill Kirakozov	Shortcut	13	Kirill Kirakozov	All
Svyatoslav Arsenov	Mitjet 2L	17	Svyatoslav Arsenov	3—4
Yadro Motorsport	MitJet 2L	18	Vitaly Zubenko	1, 4
Yadro Motorsport	MitJet 2L	88	Anton Romanov	1
Anton Romanov	MitJet 2L	88	Anton Romanov	2—4
Nikita Khudov	Mitjet 2L	24	Nikita Khudov	3—4
Vintic&Shpuntic	Shortcut	27	Maksim Vasiliev	1—2
Vintic&Shpuntic	Shortcut	69	Stepan Krumilov	1, 4
Aleksey Bashmakov	Shortcut	28	Aleksey Bashmakov	3
Vyacheslav Paputskiy	Legends CAR	29	Vyacheslav Paputskiy	3
Aleksandr Vinopal	Shortcut	30	Aleksandr Vinopal	2—4
B-Tuning Pro Racing	Shortcut	55	Aleksandr Akimenkov	3—4
Sergei Kuks	Shortcut	67	Sergei Kuks	All
David Pogosyan	Shortcut	74	David Pogosyan	All
Yuri Sunyaev	Shortcut	78	Yuri Sunyaev	All
Dmitry Eliseev	Shortcut	96	Dmitry Eliseev	4

== Calendar and results ==
The 2021 schedule was announced on 13 November 2020, with all events scheduled to be held in Russia.

Rnd.		Circuit	Date	Touring winner	SP winner	TL winner	S1600 winner	Junior winner	GT4 winner	CN winners
1	1	Smolensk Ring, Smolensk	15–16 May	Kirill Ladygin	Maksim Chernev	Andrey Radoshnov	Egor Sanin	Artemy Pershin	Anton Nemkin	Shortcut: Ivan Pugachev Legends EVO: Aleksy Khairov; Mitjet: Vitaly Zubenko
1	2	Smolensk Ring, Smolensk	15–16 May	Egor Fokin	Vladimir Sheshenin	Roman Golikov	Egor Sanin	Artemy Pershin	Denis Remenyako	Shortcut: Ivan Pugachev Legends EVO: Aleksy Khairov Mitjet: Vitaly Zubenko
2	3	NRING Circuit, Bogorodsk	19–20 June	Pavel Kalmanovich	Vladimir Sheshenin	Ivan Chubarov	Vasiliy Vladykin	Timofey Buyanov	Sergey Stolyarov	Shortcut: Sergey Ievlev Legends EVO: Aleksy Khairov Legends: Efim Lev Mitjet: Anton Romanov
2	4	NRING Circuit, Bogorodsk	19–20 June	Dmitry Bragin	Vadim Antipov	Andrey Radoshnov	Mikhail Simonov	Artem Antonov	Denis Remenyako	Shortcut: Tatiana Dobrynina Legends: Efim Lev Mitjet: Anton Romanov
3	5	Igora Drive, Priozersk	24–25 July	Mikhail Mityaev	Nikolay Vikhanskiy	Ivan Chubarov	Rustam Fatkhutdinov	Timofey Buyanov	Sergei Stolyarov	Shortcut: Sergey Ievlev Legends EVO: Shota Abkhazava Legends: Pavel Gribov Mitjet: Nikita Khudov
3	6	Igora Drive, Priozersk	24–25 July	Kirill Ladygin	Vladimir Strelchenko	Petr Plotnikov	Rustam Fatkhutdinov	Timofey Buyanov	Anton Nemkin	Shortcut: David Pogosyan Legends EVO: Shota Abkhazava; Legends: Vladimir Strelchenko Mitjet: Svyatoslav Arsenov
4	7	Moscow Raceway, Volokolamsk	21–22 August	Pavel Kalmanovich	Yuriy Arshanskiy	Andrey Radoshnov	Vasiliy Vladykin	Nikolay Kalinin	Sergey Stolyarov	Shortcut: Sergey Ievlev Legends EVO: Shota Abkhazava Legends: Efim Lev Mitjet: Vitaly Zubenko
4	8	Moscow Raceway, Volokolamsk	21–22 August	Andrey Maslennikov	Dmitry Lebedev	Petr Plotnikov	Rustam Fatkhutdinov	Nikolay Kalinin	Denis Remenyako	Shortcut: David Pogosyan Legends EVO: Shota Abkhazava Legends: Efim Lev Mitjet: Vitaly Zubenko
5	9	Kazan Ring, Kazan	11–12 September	Zakhar Slutsky	Yuri Arshanskiy	Roman Golykov	Egor Sanin	Artem Antonov	Anton Nemkin	not held
5	10	Kazan Ring, Kazan	11–12 September	Kirill Ladygin	Maksim Chernev	Ivan Chubarov	Egor Sanin	Mark Metsker	Vadim Mescheryakov	not held
6	11	Fort Grozny Autodrom, Grozny	8–9 October	Egor Orudzhev	Andrey Petukhov	Petr Plotnikov	Ilya Rodkin	not held	Anton Nemkin	not held
6	12	Fort Grozny Autodrom, Grozny	8–9 October	Dmitry Bragin	Vladimir Sheshenin	Leonid Panfilov	Rustam Fatkhutdinov	not held	Denis Remenyako	not held
7	13	Sochi Autodrom, Sochi	30–31 October	Mikhail Mytyaev	Nikolay Vikhanskiy	Ivan Chubarov	Egor Sanin	not held	Aleksandr Maslennikov	not held
7	14	Sochi Autodrom, Sochi	30–31 October	Pavel Kalmanovich	Vadim Antipov	Ivan Chubarov	Mikhail Grachev	not held	Denis Remenyako	not held

== Championship standings ==
Scoring systems

Position	1st	2nd	3rd	4th	5th	6th	7th	8th	9th	10th	11th	12th	13th	14th	15th	PP	FL
Points	25	20	16	13	11	10	9	8	7	6	5	4	3	2	1	**1**	1

=== Touring / TCR Russian Touring Car Championship ===
Pos.	Driver	SMO		NRG		IGO		MSC		KAZ		GRO		SOC		Pts.
1	(Russia) Kirill Ladygin	1	2	6	2	3	1	3	7	7	1	9	2	4	6	227
2	(Russia) Dmitry Bragin	5	14	5	1	2	2	6	12†	5	3	3	1	13	2	197
3	(Russia) Mikhail Mityaev	**2**	7	Ret	10	1	4	8	8	9	7	4	4	1	3	175
4	(Russia) Pavel Kalmanovich	8	6	**1**	8	5	8	1	5	DSQ	4	6	9	8	1	172
5	(Russia) Egor Orudzhev	7	13	3	15	DNS	13	**2**	6	3	5	1	3	**2**	4	166
6	(Russia) Andrey Maslennikov	3	4	7	4	4	5	7	1	10	9	2	7	6	11	166
7	(Russia) Ivan Lukashevich	6	3	8	6	6	3	4	3	2	8	11	6	7	5	164
8	(Russia) Zakhar Slutskiy	4	10	4	5	7	7	5	2	1	6	**10**	8	5	12	158
9	(Russia) Egor Fokin	13†	1	14	7	9	11	9	4	11	11	5	5	9	9	117
10	(Russia) Grigory Burlutskiy	Ret	5	2	13	9	6	10	11	4	2	7	Ret	14	7	116
11	(Russia) Lev Tolkachev	10	8	10	9	10	9	11	Ret	8	10	8	10	10	7	88
12	(Russia) Aidar Nuriev	9	11	9	3	13	Ret	12	9	**6**	14					62
13	(Russia) Eugeny Metsker	11	12	13	14	11	12	13	10	13	13			12	13	45
14	(Russia) Matvey Furazhkin	12	9	11	12											20
15	(Russia) Timur Shigabutdinov			12	11					12	12					17
16	(Russia) Artem Slutsky											DNS	Ret	3	Ret	16
17	(Latvia) Valter Zviedris													11	10	11
18	(Kazakhstan) Aleksandr Artemiev					12	10									10
Pos.	Driver	SMO		NRG		IGO		MSC		KAZ		GRO		SOC		Pts.

Colour	Result
Gold	Winner
Silver	Second place
Bronze	Third place
Green	Points classification
Blue	Non-points classification
Blue	Non-classified finish (NC)
Purple	Retired, not classified (Ret)
Red	Did not qualify (DNQ)
Red	Did not pre-qualify (DNPQ)
Black	Disqualified (DSQ)
White	Did not start (DNS)
White	Withdrew (WD)
White	Race cancelled (C)
Blank	Did not practice (DNP)
Blank	Did not arrive (DNA)
Blank	Excluded (EX)

**Bold** – Pole
Italics – Fastest Lap

† – Drivers did not finish the race, but were classified as they completed over 75% of the race distance.

==== Touring / TCR Russian Touring Car Championship Team's Standings ====
Pos.	Driver	SMO		NRG		IGO		MSC		KAZ		GRO		SOC		Pts.
1	LADA Sport Rosneft	1	2	6	2	1	1	3	7	7	1	4	2	1	3	401
1	LADA Sport Rosneft	**2**	7	Ret	10	3	4	8	8	9	7	9	4	4	6	401
2	Lukoil Racing Team	3	3	3	4	6	3	4	1	2	8	1	3	**2**	4	341
2	Lukoil Racing Team	6	4	7	15	DNS	13	7	3	10	9	11	6	7	5	341
3	Carville Racing	4	5	2	5	7	6	5	2	1	2	7	8	5	7	276
3	Carville Racing	Ret	10	4	12	9	7	10	11	4	6	**10**	Ret	14	12	276
4	Innostage AG Team	8	6	**1**	3	5	8	1	5	**6**	4	6	9	8	1	235
4	Innostage AG Team	9	11	9	8	13	Ret	12	9	DSQ	14					235
5	TAIF Motorsport	5	14	5	1	2	2	6	12†	5	3	3	1	13	2	215
5	TAIF Motorsport			12	11					12	12					215
6	Rumos Racing	10	8	10	9	10	9	11	10	8	10	8	10	10	7	136
6	Rumos Racing	11	12	13	14	11	12	13	Ret	13	13			12	13	136
Pos.	Driver	SMO		NRG		IGO		MSC		KAZ		GRO		SOC		Pts.

=== Super Production ===
Pos.	Driver	SMO		NRG		IGO		MSC		KAZ		GRO		SOC		Pts.
1	Vadim Antipov	1	6	**3**	1	9	10†	DSQ	3	2	2	7	8	6	1	200
2	Dmitry Lebedev	2	2	4	2	4	3	4	1	4	Ret	4	5	8	6	198
3	Vladimir Sheshenin	9†	1	1	5	2	2	6	5	DSQ	DSQ	Ret	1	**2**	3	193
4	Nikolay Vikhanskiy	4	8	6	9	1	Ret	2	9	**3**	4	5	6	1	10	174
5	Samvel Iskoyants			5	3	5	8	5	4	5	3	3	2	3	2	170
6	Maksim Chernev	3	4	2	7	3	9	Ret	Ret	DSQ	1	2	4	5	5	162
7	Andrey Petukhov	6	3	8†	4	7	5	7	7	DSQ	DSQ	1	3	7	4	148
8	Yuri Arshanskiy	8	5	Ret	8	**10**	Ret	**1**	2	1	Ret			4	Ret	121
9	Aleksandr Garmash	5	7	Ret	10	6	4	Ret	6	8	7	**Ret**	DNS	9	7	93
10	Sergey Schegolev	7	Ret	Ret	Ret	8	7	DNS	DNS	6	5	6	9	11	9	76
11	Igor Samsonov	**Ret**	9	7	6	DNS	DNS	3	Ret							43
12	Ekaterina Boyarinova							DNS	DNS	7	6	Ret	7	10	8	42
13	Pavel Pastushkov					DNS	6	8	8							26
14	Vladimir Strelchenko					Ret	1							Ret	DNS	25
-	Vasiliy Vladykin	Ret	Ret													0
Pos.	Driver	SMO		NRG		IGO		MSC		KAZ		GRO		SOC		Pts.

Colour	Result
Gold	Winner
Silver	Second place
Bronze	Third place
Green	Points classification
Blue	Non-points classification
Blue	Non-classified finish (NC)
Purple	Retired, not classified (Ret)
Red	Did not qualify (DNQ)
Red	Did not pre-qualify (DNPQ)
Black	Disqualified (DSQ)
White	Did not start (DNS)
White	Withdrew (WD)
White	Race cancelled (C)
Blank	Did not practice (DNP)
Blank	Did not arrive (DNA)
Blank	Excluded (EX)

**Bold** – Pole
Italics – Fastest Lap

† – Drivers did not finish the race, but were classified as they completed over 75% of the race distance.

==== Super Production Team's Standings ====
Pos.	Driver	SMO		NRG		IGO		MSC		KAZ		GRO		SOC		Pts.
1	Sofit Racing Team	1	2	**3**	1	4	3	4	1	2	2	3	2	6	1	418
1	Sofit Racing Team	2	6	4	2	9	10†	DSQ	3	4	Ret	4	5	8	6	418
1	LADA Sport Rosneft	6	1	1	4	2	2	6	5	DSQ	DSQ	1	1	**2**	3	339
1	LADA Sport Rosneft	9†	3	8†	5	7	5	7	7	DSQ	DSQ	Ret	3	7	4	339
3	RHHCC Racing Team	4	6	6	6	6	4	2	6	**3**	4	5	6	1	7	255
3	RHHCC Racing Team	5	8	7	9	DNS	DNS	Ret	9	8	7	**Ret**	DNS	9	10	255
Pos.	Driver	SMO		NRG		IGO		MSC		KAZ		GRO		SOC		Pts.

=== Touring Light ===
Pos.	Driver	SMO		NRG		IGO		MSC		KAZ		GRO		SOC		Pts.
1	Ivan Chubarov	9	2	**1**	4	**1**	3	7	7	4	1	2	8	**1**	1	245
2	Petr Plotnikov	2	5	7	2	4	1	2	1	7	7	**1**	2	5	5	234
3	Andrey Radoshnov	**1**	7	3	1	3	6	**1**	4	5	5	4	3	7	4	215
4	Leonid Panfilov	3	3	4	Ret	2	2	6	8	3	8	3	1	4	3	198
5	Roman Golikov	5	1	2	5	5	10	4	5	1	6	8	Ret	3	Ret	169
6	Vladimir Cherevan	4	4	6	3	7	4	3	2	8	4	Ret	6	9	6	159
7	Andrey Sevastianov	Ret	6	5	8	6	5	5	6	**2**	3	5	5	11	7	145
8	Artem Fridman	6	8	9	Ret	10	8	8	3	9	9	7	4	6	2	129
9	Aleksey Savin	Ret	9	11	DNS	DNS	DNS	11	9	6	2	Ret	9	2	9	89
10	Aleksandr Salnikov	8	11	8	6	Ret	7	9	11	10	10			8	Ret	72
11	Ilsur Akhmetvaleev							10	10	11	Ret	6	7	10	8	50
12	Ruslan Nafikov	7	10	10	7	9	9									44
13	Kirill Zakharov					8	Ret	Ret	Ret	WD	WD					8
Pos.	Driver	SMO		NRG		IGO		MSC		KAZ		GRO		SOC		Pts.

Colour	Result
Gold	Winner
Silver	Second place
Bronze	Third place
Green	Points classification
Blue	Non-points classification
Blue	Non-classified finish (NC)
Purple	Retired, not classified (Ret)
Red	Did not qualify (DNQ)
Red	Did not pre-qualify (DNPQ)
Black	Disqualified (DSQ)
White	Did not start (DNS)
White	Withdrew (WD)
White	Race cancelled (C)
Blank	Did not practice (DNP)
Blank	Did not arrive (DNA)
Blank	Excluded (EX)

**Bold** – Pole
Italics – Fastest Lap

† – Drivers did not finish the race, but were classified as they completed over 75% of the race distance.

==== Touring Light Team's Standings ====
Pos.	Driver	SMO		NRG		IGO		MSC		KAZ		GRO		SOC		Pts.
1	LADA Sport Rosneft	3	2	**1**	4	**1**	2	6	7	3	1	2	1	**1**	1	443
1	LADA Sport Rosneft	9	3	4	Ret	2	3	7	8	4	8	3	8	4	3	443
2	Rally Academy	2	4	6	2	4	1	2	1	7	4	**1**	2	5	5	393
2	Rally Academy	4	5	7	3	7	4	3	2	8	7	Ret	6	9	6	393
3	SpeedWay Ranch	**1**	1	2	1	3	6	**1**	4	1	5	4	3	3	4	384
3	SpeedWay Ranch	5	7	3	5	5	10	4	5	5	6	8	Ret	7	Ret	384
4	B-Tuning Pro Racing	Ret	6	5	8	6	5	5	6	**2**	2	5	5	2	7	218
4	B-Tuning Pro Racing					8	Ret	Ret	Ret	6	3	Ret	9	11	9	218
Pos.	Driver	SMO		NRG		IGO		MSC		KAZ		GRO		SOC		Pts.

=== S1600 ===
Pos.	Driver	SMO		NRG		IGO		MSC		KAZ		GRO		SOC		Pts.
1	Egor Sanin	**1**	1	**2**	3	2	3	DNS (Note: One point for qualification.)	5	1	1	3	3	**1**	3	264
2	Rustam Fatkhutdinov	2	2	11	11	1	1	4	1	2	4	2	1	2	Ret	243
3	Vasiliy Vladykin	5	3	1	4	18	13	1	4	20	5	DNS	14	3	7	145
4	Mikhail Grachev	8	9	4	2	5	4	21†	2	9	6	DNS	7	Ret	1	145
5	Boris Shulmeister	9	17	5	7	17	5	6	14	4	3	6	2	7	5	129
6	Nikita Dubinin	6	5	Ret	8	**3**	2	**2** (Note: No additional point. Polesitter Egor Sanin, did not start.)	11	5	Ret	4	19	6	DNS	126
7	Vitaly Larionov	10	10	3	6	Ret	6	3	9	11	7	10	10	4	4	123
8	Stanislav Novikov	4	4	23	9	4	Ret	5	3	17	2	5	5	Ret	Ret	106
9	Ilya Rodkin	DNS	DNS	10	24	16	7	17	10	6	9	**1**	4	8	2	105
10	Mikhail Simonov	3	20	8	1	19	10	Ret	7	3	11	7	15			95
11	Vasiliy Korablev	7	6	9	DSQ	7	24	8	Ret	7	18†	13	6	5	13	79
12	Philipp Tuponosov	11	14	7	17	Ret	23	Ret	6	**18**	8	9	9	9	Ret	56
13	Mikhail Dralin	Ret	8	16	10	6	8	7	Ret	15	17			10	14	50
14	Jabrail Akhmadov	15	7	6	13	Ret	9	11	8	21	12					47
15	Ivan Tverdokhlebov	19	Ret	Ret	15	10	12	9	Ret	10	Ret	11	12	14	8	43
16	Dmitry Dudarev	12	13	Ret	5	9	19	14	12	19	13	Ret	18	16	12	38
17	Ilya Yekushevsky	13	11	12	12	Ret	Ret	19	13	8	10					33
18	Oleg Kravtsov	22	Ret	18	16	Ret	11	12	20	Ret	Ret	16	8	DNS	9	24
19	David Pogosyan	17	15	15	14	Ret	Ret	15	23†	13	15	12	16	11	Ret	18
20	Efim Gantmakher											14	11	12	10	17
21	Mikhail Diachenko	14	Ret	13	21	11	14	13	22							15
22	Ilya Gorbatsky	21	12			DNS	17	10	16	Ret	14			18	Ret	12
23	Ruslan Nafikov											8	13			11
24	Thomas Johnson					8	18			Ret	Ret			13	6	8
25	Aleksandr Chachava	20	19	20	22	13	20	16	19	14	16	15	17	15	15	8
26	Artem Antonov													17	11	5
27	Anatoly Ershikov	18	18			12	16	DSQ	18							4
28	Samvel Iskoyants									12	Ret					4
29	Roman Shusharin	16	16	14	20	Ret	15									3
30	Artem Volkov			19	19	14	21	20	15							3
31	Ivan Kazarin					15	Ret									1
32	Tatiana Eliseeva			17	Ret	Ret	22	22†	17	16	Ret					0
33	Manuchar Chapodze							18	21							0
34	Vadim Gagarin			Ret	18											0
35	Marat Knyazev			21	DSQ											0
36	Lev Yuditsky			22	23											0
37	Maksim Kadakov	23	Ret													0
38	Ilya Sidorov					Ret	Ret									0
39	Yaroslava Kopytina									Ret	Ret					0
40	Dmitry Semenov					Ret	DNS									0
-	Viktor Kotov			DNS	DNS											-
-	Dmitry Kazarin					DNS	DNS									-
Pos.	Driver	SMO		NRG		IGO		MSC		KAZ		GRO		SOC		Pts.

Colour	Result
Gold	Winner
Silver	Second place
Bronze	Third place
Green	Points classification
Blue	Non-points classification
Blue	Non-classified finish (NC)
Purple	Retired, not classified (Ret)
Red	Did not qualify (DNQ)
Red	Did not pre-qualify (DNPQ)
Black	Disqualified (DSQ)
White	Did not start (DNS)
White	Withdrew (WD)
White	Race cancelled (C)
Blank	Did not practice (DNP)
Blank	Did not arrive (DNA)
Blank	Excluded (EX)

**Bold** – Pole
Italics – Fastest Lap

† – Drivers did not finish the race, but were classified as they completed over 75% of the race distance.

==== S1600 Team's Standings ====
Pos.	Driver	SMO		NRG		IGO		MSC		KAZ		GRO		SOC		Pts.
1	Innostage AG Team	**1**	1	**2**	3	2	3	17	5	1	1	**1**	3	8	2	354
1	Innostage AG Team	4	4	23	9	16	7	DNS	10	6	9	3	4	Ret	Ret	354
2	Akhmat Racing Team	2	2	6	11	1	1	4	1	2	4	2	1	5	13	290
2	Akhmat Racing Team	15	7	11	13	Ret	9	11	8	21	12	DNS	7			290
3	AG Team	6	5	10	8	**3**	2	2	3	5	2	4	5	**1**	3	257
3	AG Team	DNS	DNS	Ret	24	4	Ret	5	11	17	Ret	5	19	6	DNS	257
4	Akhmat Racing Team 2	7	6	4	2	5	4	8	2	7	6	8	6	2	1	232
4	Akhmat Racing Team 2	8	9	9	DSQ	7	24	21†	Ret	9	18†	13	13	Ret	Ret	232
5	GTE Racing Team	5	3	1	4	18	13	1	4	**18**	5	9	9	3	7	195
5	GTE Racing Team	17	15	7	17	Ret	23	Ret	6	20	8	DNS	14	9	Ret	195
6	Rumos Racing	9	17	5	7	13	5	6	14	4	3	6	2	7	5	137
6	Rumos Racing	20	19	20	22	17	20	16	19	14	16	15	17	15	15	137
7	Rally Academy	10	10	3	6	Ret	6	3	9	11	7	10	10	4	4	135
7	Rally Academy	21	12			DNS	17	10	16	Ret	14			18	Ret	135
8	Bragin Racing Team	3	11	8	1	19	10	19	7	3	10	7	11			135
8	Bragin Racing Team	13	20	12	12	Ret	Ret	Ret	13	8	11	14	15			135
Pos.	Driver	SMO		NRG		IGO		MSC		KAZ		GRO		SOC		Pts.

=== S1600 Junior ===
Pos.	Driver	SMO		NRG		IGO		MSC		KAZ		GRO	SOC	Pts.
1	Artem Antonov	2	2	2	1	3	5	3	3	1	2	not held		189
2	Timofey Buyanov	3	3	**1**	3	**1**	1	5	5	2	4	not held		178
3	Mark Metsker	3	6	3	2	7	4	**2**	2	**3**	1	not held		170
4	Nikolay Kalinin	Ret	4	4	4	5	2	1	1	5	3	not held		149
5	Artemy Pershin	**1**	1			2	3	4	4			not held		115
6	Stepan Anufriev	4	5	5	5	6	7	6	6			not held		85
7	Konstantin Dubensky							7	7	4	5	not held		42
8	Mark Novikov					4	6					not held		23
Pos.	Driver	SMO		NRG		IGO		MSC		KAZ		GRO	SOC	Pts.

Colour	Result
Gold	Winner
Silver	Second place
Bronze	Third place
Green	Points classification
Blue	Non-points classification
Blue	Non-classified finish (NC)
Purple	Retired, not classified (Ret)
Red	Did not qualify (DNQ)
Red	Did not pre-qualify (DNPQ)
Black	Disqualified (DSQ)
White	Did not start (DNS)
White	Withdrew (WD)
White	Race cancelled (C)
Blank	Did not practice (DNP)
Blank	Did not arrive (DNA)
Blank	Excluded (EX)

**Bold** – Pole
Italics – Fastest Lap

† – Drivers did not finish the race, but were classified as they completed over 75% of the race distance.

==== S1600 Junior Team's Standings ====
Pos.	Driver	SMO		NRG		IGO		MSC		KAZ		GRO	SOC	Pts.
1	Rumos Racing	3	4	3	2	5	2	1	1	**3**	1	not held		319
1	Rumos Racing	Ret	6	4	4	7	4	**2**	2	5	3	not held		319
Pos.	Driver	SMO		NRG		IGO		MSC		KAZ		GRO	SOC	Pts.

=== SMP GT4 Russia ===
Pos.	Driver	SMO		NRG		IGO		MSC		KAZ		GRO		SOC		Pts.
1	Denis Remenyako	**2**	1	4	1	8	8	7	1	2	2	2	1	4	1	259
2	Anton Nemkin	1	3	6	8	5	1	5	3	1	3	**1**	4	2	6	235
1	Sergei Stolyarov	4	Ret	**1**	3	1	2	**1**	2	**4**	Ret	3	Ret	9	5	195
4	Marat Khairov	3	4	3	2	4	5	9	6	7	4	6	2	6	4	184
5	Vadim Mescheryakov	9	2	7	Ret	6	7	2	10	3	1	4	Ret	3	7	162
6	Aleksandr Vaintrub	Ret	Ret	2	4	**2**	Ret	3	5	9	5	5	3	5	3	153
7	Andrey Solukovtsev	5	5	8	6	9	3	4	4	6	6	7	5	7	9	145
8	Andrey Goncharov	6	6	9	7	7	6	Ret	7	5	DSQ	8	6	Ret	10	99
9	Aleksandr Maslennikov	7	Ret			3	4							**1**	2	85
10	Andrey Kremlev	8	7			10	9	8	9							45
11	Svetlana Gorbunova							6	8	8	7					35
12	Artem Soloviev			5	5											22
13	Danila Ivanov													8	8	16
Pos.	Driver	SMO		NRG		IGO		MSC		KAZ		GRO		SOC		Pts.

Colour	Result
Gold	Winner
Silver	Second place
Bronze	Third place
Green	Points classification
Blue	Non-points classification
Blue	Non-classified finish (NC)
Purple	Retired, not classified (Ret)
Red	Did not qualify (DNQ)
Red	Did not pre-qualify (DNPQ)
Black	Disqualified (DSQ)
White	Did not start (DNS)
White	Withdrew (WD)
White	Race cancelled (C)
Blank	Did not practice (DNP)
Blank	Did not arrive (DNA)
Blank	Excluded (EX)

**Bold** – Pole
Italics – Fastest Lap

† – Drivers did not finish the race, but were classified as they completed over 75% of the race distance.

==== SMP GT4 Russia Team's Standings ====
Pos.	Driver	SMO		NRG		IGO		MSC		KAZ		GRO		SOC		Pts.
1	Capital Racing Team MotorSharks	1	1	4	1	5	1	5	1	1	2	**1**	1	2	1	494
1	Capital Racing Team MotorSharks	**2**	3	6	8	8	8	7	3	2	3	2	4	4	6	494
2	YADRO Motorsport	4	6	**1**	3	1	2	**1**	2	4	5	3	3	5	3	368
2	YADRO Motorsport	6	Ret	2	4	**2**	Ret	3	5	9	Ret	5	Ret	9	5	368
3	RSCar Motorsport	8	2	5	5	6	7	2	8	3	1	4	Ret	3	7	249
3	RSCar Motorsport	9	7	7	Ret	10	9	6	10	8	7					249
Pos.	Driver	SMO		NRG		IGO		MSC		KAZ		GRO		SOC		Pts.
