= Egor Orudzhev =

Russian racing driver

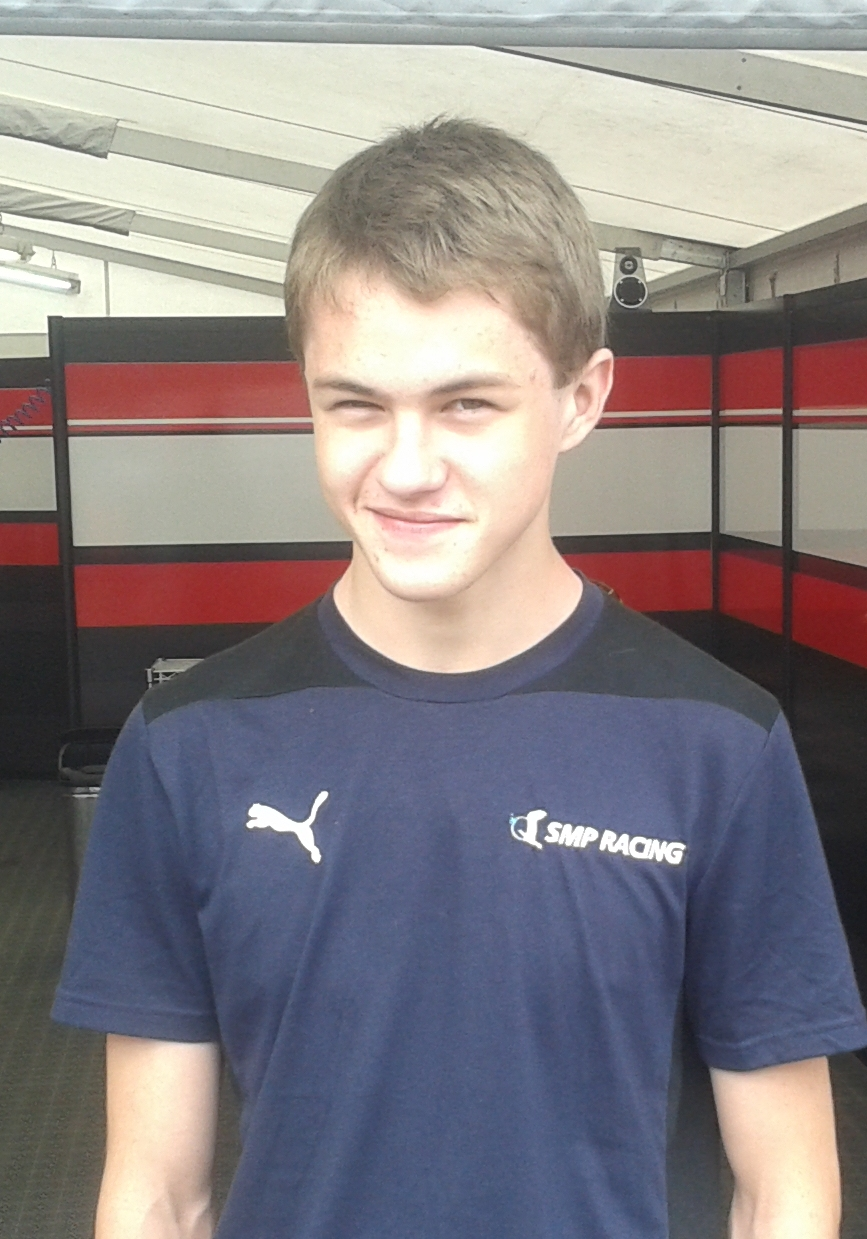
- Orudzhev in 2013.
- Nationality: (Russia) Russian
- Born: Egor Alekseevich Orudzhev; 16 October 1995 (age 31) Saint Petersburg, Russia
- Categorisation: FIA Silver (until 2017); FIA Gold (2018–)

Previous series
- 2021–2022 2018–19 2017–18 2015–17 2014 2012–14 2012–14 2012: Russian Circuit Racing Series; World Endurance Championship; European Le Mans Series; World Series Formula V8 3.5; Toyota Racing Series; Eurocup Formula Renault 2.0; Formula Renault 2.0 Alps; French F4 Championship

Egor Alekseevich Orudzhev (Russian: Его́р Алексе́евич Ору́джев, IPA: [ɪˈɡor ɐˈrudʐɨf], born 16 October 1995) is a Russian racing driver.

== Early career ==
=== Karting ===
Born in Saint Petersburg, Orudzhev entered karting in 2006, when he finished as runner-up in the Russian Karting Championship in the Mini class, before he became champion in the Russian KF3 Championship in 2009. Also in 2009, he moved to the international scene, where he too competed in the KF3 category. He progressed into the KF2 category in 2011, finishing third in the WSK Euro Series.

=== Lower formulae ===
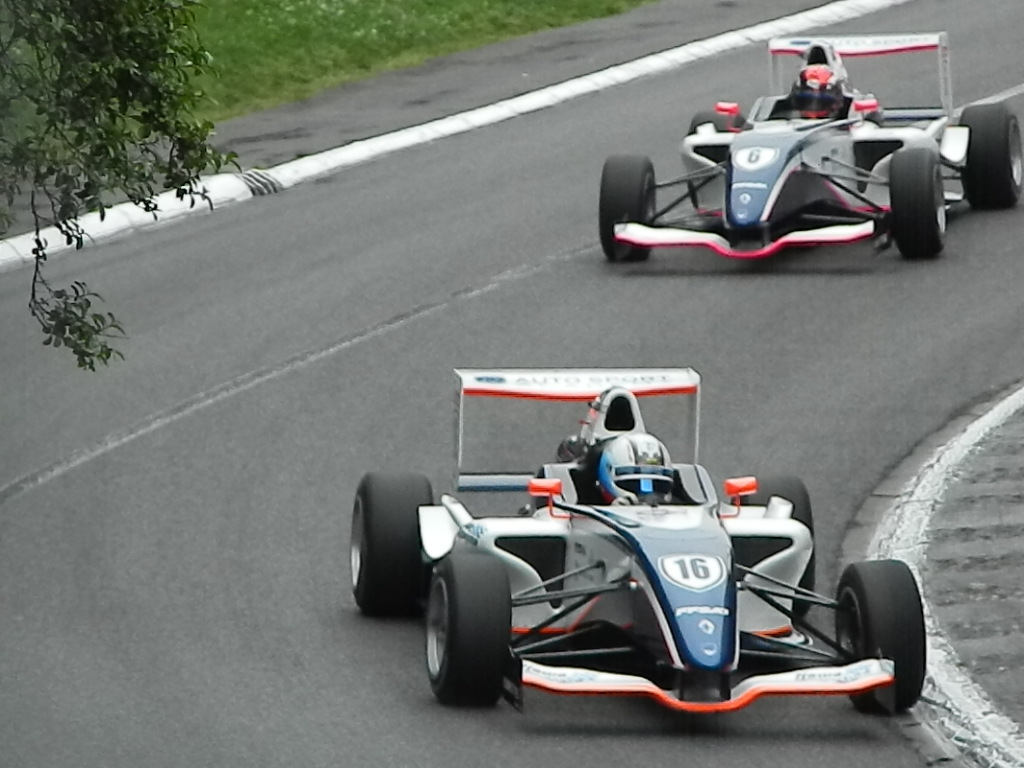
Orudzhev leading Enzo Guibbert at the 2012 Pau Grand Prix F4 race

In 2012, Orudzhev made his debut in single-seaters, taking part in the French F4 Championship. He closed the top ten in the series standings with seven point-scoring finishes, including two podiums — a second and a third at the Bugatti Circuit. He also contested single rounds in both Formula Renault 2.0 Alps and Eurocup Formula Renault 2.0 with AV Formula and Fortec Motorsports respectively.

For 2013, Orudzhev moved to Tech 1 Racing for full-season campaigns in the Eurocup Formula Renault 2.0 and Formula Renault 2.0 Alps. In the Eurocup, he took a podium finish in the opening race of the season at Motorland Aragon, as well as another eight point-scoring finishes. In the Alps championship, he finished fifth with two podiums at Misano and Imola.

Having competed in the Toyota Racing Series during the 2014 winter, where three victories, including his maiden single-seater triumph at Teretonga Park, helped him towards sixth place overall, Orudzhev stayed with Tech 1 for that year's Eurocup season. He ended up eighth in the standings, scoring three podiums. During the same year, the Russian made his Formula Three debut in British Formula 3, racing for Carlin, where he won his inaugural race at Silverstone, starting from the front row.

=== Formula Renault 3.5 ===
Orudzhev followed his three seasons in the Eurocup with a step-up to the Formula Renault 3.5 Series in 2015, racing for Arden Motorsport. His season proved to be a breakthrough, as he not only convincingly beat his teammate — future Formula One driver Nicholas Latifi — but finished fifth in the standings as the second-highest rookie. Victories at the Hungaroring and the Bugatti Circuit in Le Mans were the highlights of his season, with Orudzhev scoring two further podiums. He remained in the championship, which had now been rebranded to the Formula V8 3.5 Series, for 2016, once again driving with Arden. A total of six retirements cost him a chance to fight for the title, as he won five races on his way to third in the standings, though his and teammate Aurélien Panis's efforts would be enough for Arden to be crowned teams' champions at the final round.

In 2017, Orudzhev switched to AV Formula, which would be branded to SMP Racing with AVF due to his sponsorship. Once again, a flurry of retirements separated Orudzhev from fully challenging eventual champion Pietro Fittipaldi, though he was nonetheless able to claim ten podiums, including two wins. Orudzhev left the series with one round to go, which dropped him to sixth in the standings.

== Sportscar career ==
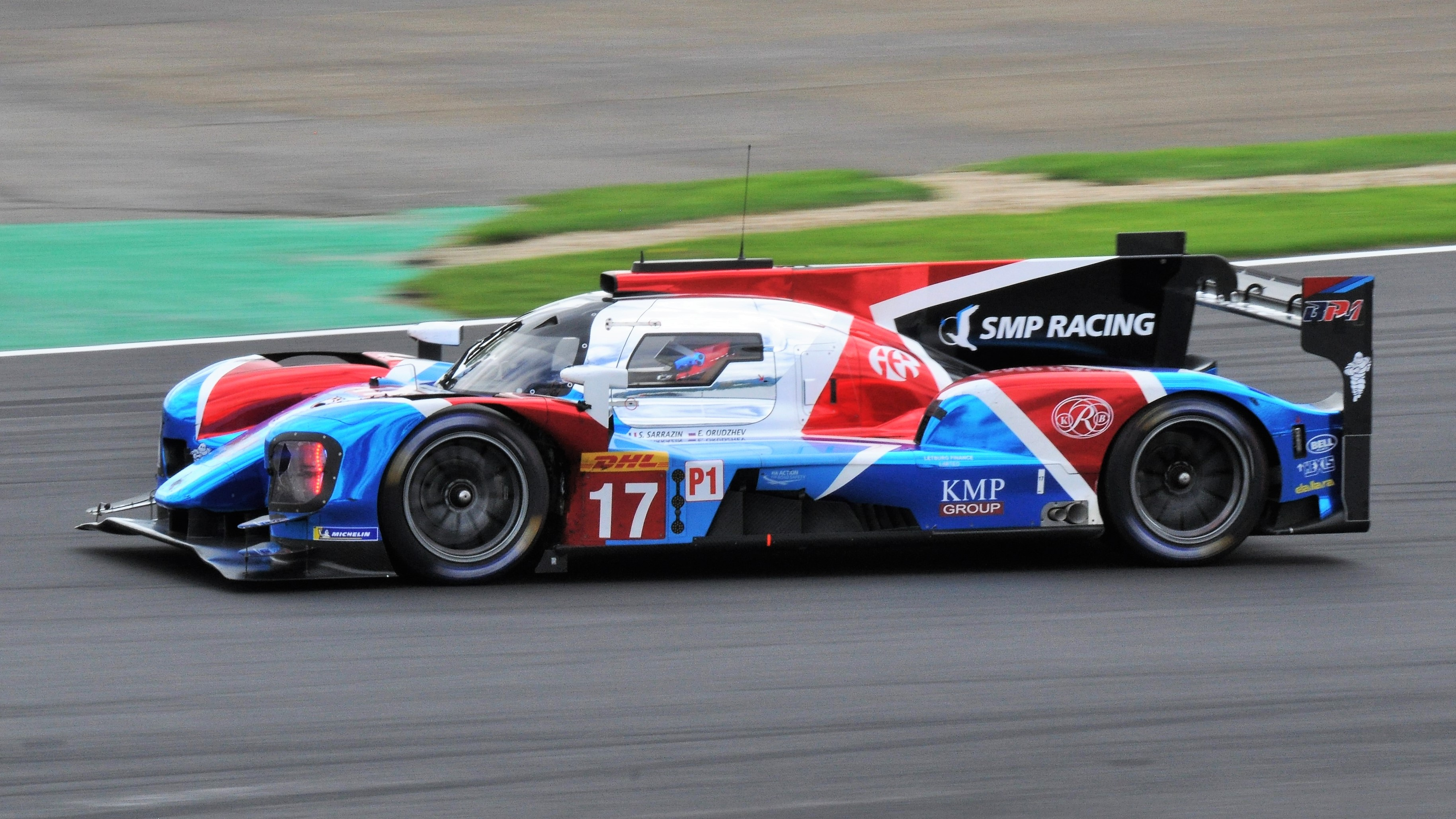
Orudzhev was a backbone of SMP Racing's LMP1 effort (pictured in 2018)

During the summer of 2017, Orudzhev joined SMP Racing in the LMP2 category of the European Le Mans Series, partnering fellow V8 3.5 competitor Matevos Isaakyan for the final four races of the season. At their second race in Le Castellet, the pair performed a dominant drive to take their maiden victory in endurance racing. At the following round in Belgium, Orudzhev led the effort, driving for three out of four hours and helping the team to another podium in third. They finished third again at the season finale, thereby claiming fourth place in the teams' standings.

The following season, Orudzhev and the team raced in three rounds of the ELMS in preparation for SMP's campaign in the top class of the 2018–19 FIA World Endurance Championship. Orudzhev drove the team's No. 17 entry, piloting a BR Engineering BR1 alongside Stéphane Sarrazin and Isaakyan. Two crashes from Isaakyan in the first two races set the outfit back, although they would inherit their first podium at Silverstone when both Toyotas were disqualified. The car continued to not finish races for the rest of the season, with the only other points result being fourth at Spa.

At the start of the WEC's 2019–20 season, Orudzhev moved to Team LNT in order to pilot their Ginetta G60-LT-P1 No. 5. At the season opener in Silverstone, the team benefited from troubles which befell fellow privateers Rebellion, finishing third overall, four laps down to the leading Toyotas. After two further rounds, Orudzhev left the team.

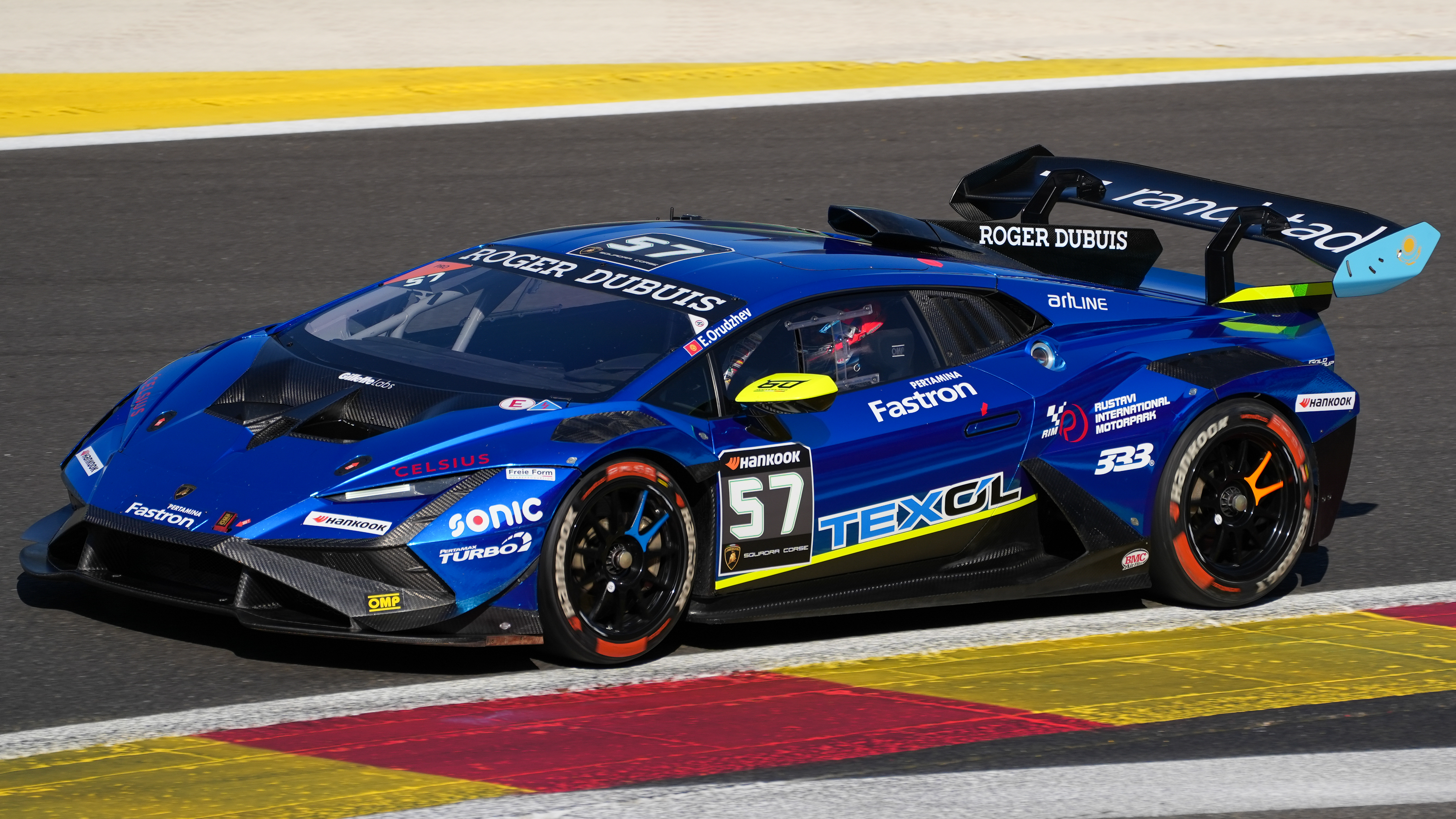
Orudzhev in his Lamborghini Super Trofeo car at Spa-Francorchamps in 2024

After not racing in 2020, Orudzhev spent the next two years racing for the Lukoil Racing Team in the touring class of the Russian Circuit Racing Series, winning a race in 2021 and finishing second in the championship in 2022, narrowly losing out to Dmitry Bragin. In 2023, he entered the Lamborghini Super Trofeo Europe in a Pro-Am lineup together with Shota Abkhazava, driving for ART-Line. The pair scored two class podiums.

== Racing record ==
=== Career summary ===
Season	Series	Team	Races	Wins	Poles	F/Laps	Podiums	Points	Position
2012	French F4 Championship	Auto Sport Academy	12	0	0	2	2	75	10th
2012	Eurocup Formula Renault 2.0	Fortec Motorsports	2	0	0	0	0	N/A	NC†
2012	Formula Renault 2.0 Alps	AV Formula	2	0	0	0	0	0	45th
2013	Eurocup Formula Renault 2.0	Tech 1 Racing	14	0	0	0	1	78	7th
2013	Formula Renault 2.0 Alps	Tech 1 Racing	14	0	1	0	2	75	5th
2013	Pau Formula Renault 2.0 Trophy	Tech 1 Racing	1	0	0	0	1	N/A	**2nd**
2014	Eurocup Formula Renault 2.0	Tech 1 Racing	14	0	0	3	3	83	8th
2014	Formula Renault 2.0 Alps	Tech 1 Racing	6	0	0	0	2	N/A	NC†
2014	Toyota Racing Series	M2 Competition	15	3	1	1	8	595	6th
2014	British Formula 3 International Series	Carlin	3	1	0	1	1	26	12th
2015	Formula Renault 3.5 Series	Arden Motorsport	17	2	0	0	4	133	5th
2016	Formula V8 3.5 Series	Arden Motorsport	18	5	1	3	8	193	**3rd**
2017	World Series Formula V8 3.5	SMP Racing with AVF	16	2	1	2	10	198	6th
2017	European Le Mans Series - LMP2	SMP Racing	4	1	0	0	3	63	6th
2018	European Le Mans Series - LMP2	SMP Racing	3	0	0	0	0	6	22nd
2018	24 Hours of Le Mans	SMP Racing	1	0	0	0	0	N/A	DNF
2018–19	FIA World Endurance Championship	SMP Racing	8	0	0	0	1	27	14th
2019	24 Hours of Le Mans	SMP Racing	1	0	0	0	0	N/A	DNF
2019–20	FIA World Endurance Championship	Team LNT	3	0	0	0	1	27.5	15th
2021	Russian Circuit Racing Series - Touring	Lukoil Racing Team	13	1	2	1	6	166	5th
2022	Russian Circuit Racing Series - Touring	Lukoil Racing Team	12	2	3	2	4	226	**2nd**
2023	Lamborghini Super Trofeo Europe - Pro-Am	ART-Line	12	0	0	0	2	?	?*
2024	Lamborghini Super Trofeo Europe - Pro	ART-Line	12	4	2	?	5	93	**3rd**
2024	Lamborghini Super Trofeo World Final - Pro	ART-Line	2	1	0	1	1	23	**1st**
2025	GT2 European Series	ART-Line							
2025	Lamborghini Super Trofeo Europe - Pro-Am	ART-Line	10	0	2	2	4	74	5th
2026	Lamborghini Super Trofeo Europe - Pro-Am	ART-Line	2	1	0	1	1	23	8th

† As Orudzhev was a guest driver, he was ineligible to score points.
^{*} Season still in progress.

=== Complete French F4 Championship results ===
(key) (Races in bold indicate pole position; races in italics indicate fastest lap)

Year	1	2	3	4	5	6	7	8	9	10	11	12	13	14	DC	Points
2012	LÉD; 1; 14	LÉD; 2; 9	PAU; 1; 7	PAU; 2 Ret	VDV; 1; 5	VDV; 2 Ret	MAG; 1; 5	MAG; 2; 14	NAV; 1; 4	NAV; 2; 11	LMS; 1; 3	LMS; 2; 2	LEC; 1	LEC; 2	10th	75

=== Complete Eurocup Formula Renault 2.0 results ===
(key) (Races in bold indicate pole position) (Races in italics indicate fastest lap)

Year	Entrant	1	2	3	4	5	6	7	8	9	10	11	12	13	14	Pos	Points
2012	Fortec Motorsports	ALC; 1	ALC; 2	SPA; 1	SPA; 2	NÜR; 1	NÜR; 2	MSC; 1	MSC; 2	HUN; 1	HUN; 2	LEC; 1	LEC; 2	CAT; 1 Ret	CAT; 2 Ret	NC†	0
2013	Tech 1 Racing	ALC; 1; 7	ALC; 2; 2	SPA; 1; 29	SPA; 2 Ret	MSC; 1; 22	MSC; 2; 7	RBR; 1 Ret	RBR; 2; 26	HUN; 1; 4	HUN; 2; 8	LEC; 1; 7	LEC; 2; 9	CAT; 1; 4	CAT; 2; 5	7th	78
2014	Tech 1 Racing	ALC; 1; 2	ALC; 2; 25	SPA; 1; 6	SPA; 2; 9	MSC; 1; 6	MSC; 2; 9	NÜR; 1 Ret	NÜR; 2; 9	HUN; 1; 11	HUN; 2 Ret	LEC; 1; 2	LEC; 2; 3	JER; 1; 11	JER; 2 Ret	8th	83

† As Orudzhev was a guest driver, he was ineligible to score points

=== Complete Formula Renault 2.0 Alps Series results ===
(key) (Races in bold indicate pole position; races in italics indicate fastest lap)

Year	Team	1	2	3	4	5	6	7	8	9	10	11	12	13	14	Pos	Points
2012	AV Formula	MNZ; 1	MNZ; 2	PAU; 1	PAU; 2	IMO; 1	IMO; 2	SPA; 1	SPA; 2	RBR; 1	RBR; 2	MUG; 1 Ret	MUG; 2; 26	CAT; 1	CAT; 2	45th	0
2013	Tech 1 Racing	VLL; 1; 14	VLL; 2; 26	IMO1; 1; 9	IMO1; 2; 11	SPA; 1 Ret	SPA; 2 Ret	MNZ; 1; 4	**MNZ**; **2**; 16	MIS; 1; 4	MIS; 2; 2	MUG; 1; 7	MUG; 2 Ret	IMO2; 1; 6	IMO2; 2; 3	5th	75
2014	Tech 1 Racing	IMO; 1; 16	IMO; 2 Ret	PAU; 1	PAU; 2	RBR; 1	RBR; 2	SPA; 1	SPA; 2	MNZ; 1	MNZ; 2	MUG; 1; 10	MUG; 2; 6	JER; 1; 3	JER; 2; 2	NC†	0

† As Orudzhev was a guest driver, he was ineligible for points

=== Complete World Series Formula V8 3.5 results ===
(key) (Races in bold indicate pole position) (Races in italics indicate fastest lap)

Year	Team	1	2	3	4	5	6	7	8	9	10	11	12	13	14	15	16	17	18	Pos.	Points
2015	Arden Motorsport	ALC; 1 Ret	ALC; 2; 18	MON; 1; 4	SPA; 1; 10	SPA; 2; 9	HUN; 1; 1	HUN; 2; 11	RBR; 1; 11	RBR; 2 Ret	SIL; 1; 7	SIL; 2; 6	NÜR; 1; 9	NÜR; 2; 5	BUG; 1; 2	BUG; 2; 1	JER; 1; 2	JER; 2; 7		5th	133
2016	Arden Motorsport	**ALC**; **1** Ret	ALC; 2; 14†	HUN; 1 Ret	HUN; 2; 9	SPA; 1; 1	SPA; 2 Ret	LEC; 1; 1	LEC; 2; 3	SIL; 1 Ret	SIL; 2; 3	RBR; 1 Ret	RBR; 2; 5	MNZ; 1; 7	MNZ; 2; 1	JER; 1; 2	JER; 2; 1	CAT; 1; 1	CAT; 2; 7	3rd	193
2017	SMP Racing with AVF	SIL; 1; 2	SIL; 2; 2	SPA; 1; 3	SPA; 2; 7	MNZ; 1; 5	MNZ; 2 Ret	**JER**; **1** Ret	JER; 2; 2	ALC; 1; 1	ALC; 2; 3	NÜR; 1; 3	NÜR; 2; 3	MEX; 1 Ret	MEX; 2 Ret	COA; 1; 2	COA; 2; 1	BHR; 1	BHR; 2	6th	198

=== Complete European Le Mans Series results ===
Year	Entrant	Class	Chassis	Engine	1	2	3	4	5	6	Rank	Points
2017	SMP Racing	LMP2	Dallara P217	Gibson GK428 4.2 L V8	SIL	MNZ	RBR; 6	LEC; 1	SPA; 3	ALG; 3	6th	63
2018	SMP Racing	LMP2	Dallara P217	Gibson GK428 4.2 L V8	LEC; Ret	MNZ; Ret	RBR; 7	SIL	SPA	ALG	22nd	6

=== Complete FIA World Endurance Championship results ===
Year	Entrant	Class	Chassis	Engine	1	2	3	4	5	6	7	8	Rank	Points
2018–19	SMP Racing	LMP1	BR Engineering BR1	AER P60B 2.4 L Turbo V6	SPA; Ret	LMS; Ret	SIL; 3	FUJ; Ret	SHA; Ret	SEB; NC	SPA; 4	LMS; Ret	14th	27
2019–20	Team LNT	LMP1	Ginetta G60-LT-P1	AER P60C 2.4 L Turbo V6	SIL; 3	FUJ; 11	SHA; 4	BHR	COA	SPA	LMS	BHR	15th	27.5

=== 24 Hours of Le Mans results ===
Year	Team	Co-Drivers	Car	Class	Laps	Pos.	Class Pos.
2018	(Russia) SMP Racing	(France) Stéphane Sarrazin (Russia) Matevos Isaakyan	BR Engineering BR1-AER	LMP1	123	DNF	DNF
2019	(Russia) SMP Racing	(France) Stéphane Sarrazin (Russia) Sergey Sirotkin	BR Engineering BR1-AER	LMP1	163	DNF	DNF
