= Autodrom Saint Petersburg =

Motorsport facility in Saint Petersburg, Russia

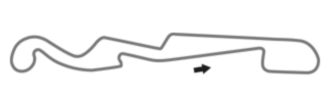
- Configuration A (2010–present)
- Location: Shushary, Saint Petersburg
- Coordinates: 59°47′2.4″N 30°27′25.2″E
- Opened: 4 November 2010; 14 years ago
- Major events: Former: Russian Touring Car Championship (2011)

Configuration A (2010–present)
- Length: 3.073 km (1.909 mi)
- Turns: 11
- Race lap record: 1:31.597 ( (Russia) Aleksandr Frolov, SEAT León, 2011, Super 2000)

Configuration B (2010–present)
- Length: 1.820 km (1.131 mi)
- Turns: 7

Configuration C (2010–present)
- Length: 1.260 km (0.783 mi)
- Turns: 7

Autodrom Saint Petersburg (Russian: Автодром Санкт-Петербург) is a permanent motorsport facility in Saint Petersburg, Russia.

== History ==
The motorsport complex was opened in the autumn of 2010 in the south of Saint Petersburg, in the Shushary settlement. The route has a total length of 3.073 km (1.909 mi) with a width of 12 to 16 m (13 to 17 yd) and can be used in three variants:

- Configuration A 3.073 km (1.909 mi) with 7 right and 4 left turns
- Configuration B 1.820 km (1.131 mi) with 5 right and 2 left turns
- Configuration C 1.260 km (0.783 mi) with 4 right and 3 left turns

In configuration B and C, competitions can be held at the same time. The track complies with the safety standards of FIA Category 2 and is driven counter-clockwise. The tracks are used for national automobile and motorcycle races, including drag race events. In 2011 a run for the Russian Touring Car Championship (RTCC) took place on the track.

There is also a sports driving school on the site that trains racing drivers and offers driver safety training.

No races were held in 2022.
