= Vladimir Sheshenin =

Russian racing driver (born 1989)

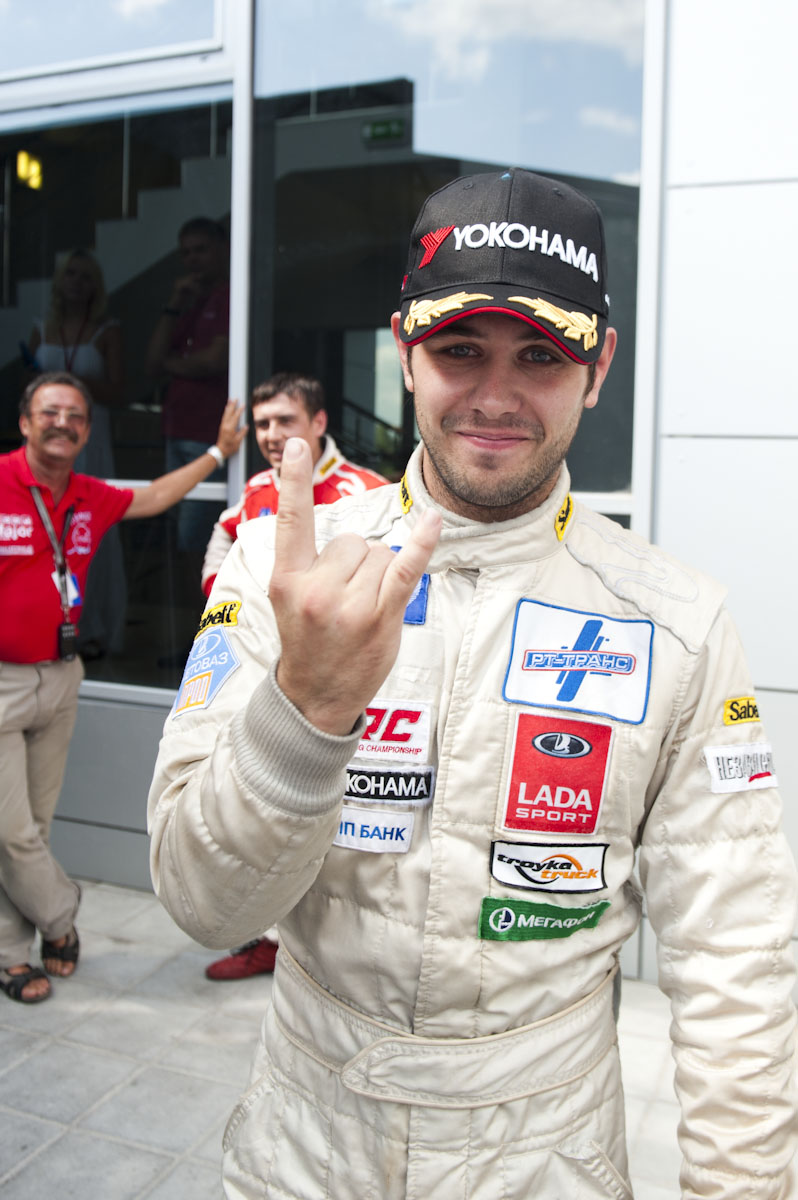
- Nationality: (Russia) Russian
- Born: Vladimir Sergeyevich Sheshenin; 10 March 1989 (age 37) Yekaterinburg, Russian SFSR, Soviet Union

TCR International Series career
- Debut season: 2016
- Current team: Liqui Moly Team Engstler
- Car number: 19
- Starts: 2

Previous series
- 2013-16 2012 2012 2011 2010 2006 2001-05, 07-08: Russian Circuit Racing Series; Russian National Championship; LADA Granta Cup; LADA Kalina Cup; Russian Touring Light Championship; LADA Revolution Cup; Karting

Championship titles
- 2014, 2016 2012: RCRS - National Class; Russian National Championship

Vladimir Sergeyevich Sheshenin (born 10 March 1989) is a Russian racing driver currently competing in the Russian Circuit Racing Series. Having previously competed in the TCR International Series, LADA Granta Cup & LADA Revolution Cup amongst others.

== Racing career ==
Sheshenin began his career in 2001 in Karting, he raced there for many seasons up until 2008. In 2006, he switched to the LADA Revolution Cup, he raced there for a single season and finished fourth in the championship standings at the end of the season. Having returned to karting in 2007, he stayed there until 2008. He switched to the Russian Touring Light Championship for 2010, finishing fourth in the championship standings. In 2011, he switched to the LADA Kalina Cup, finishing third in the standings. In 2012, he raced in both the LADA Granta Cup and Russian National Championship, he won the Russian National Championship and finished third in the LADA Granta Cup that year. For 2013, he switched to the Russian Circuit Racing Series, he finished third in the standings that year. In 2014, he won the championship taking four wins. He then finished second in championship standings in 2015. In 2016, he took his third championship title in Russian National Championship.

In July 2016, it was announced that Sheshenin would race in the TCR International Series, driving a Volkswagen Golf GTI TCR for Liqui Moly Team Engstler.

== Racing record ==
=== Complete TCR International Series results ===
(key) (Races in bold indicate pole position) (Races in italics indicate fastest lap)

| Year | Team | Car | 1 | 2 | 3 | 4 | 5 | 6 | 7 | 8 | 9 | 10 | 11 | 12 | 13 | 14 | 15 | 16 | 17 | 18 | 19 | 20 | 21 | 22 | DC | Points |
|---|---|---|---|---|---|---|---|---|---|---|---|---|---|---|---|---|---|---|---|---|---|---|---|---|---|---|
| 2016 | Liqui Moly Team Engstler | Volkswagen Golf GTI TCR | BHR; 1 | BHR; 2 | POR; 1 | POR; 2 | BEL; 1 | BEL; 2 | ITA; 1 | ITA; 2 | AUT; 1 | AUT; 2 | GER; 1 | GER; 2 | RUS; 1 Ret | RUS; 2; 10 | THA; 1 | THA; 2 | SIN; 1 | SIN; 2 | MYS; 1 | MYS; 2 | MAC; 1 | MAC; 2 | 38th | 1 |
