= Sirius Autodrom =

Racing circuit in Russia

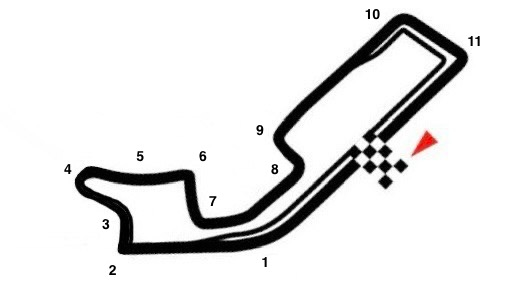
- Permanent Circuit (2014–present)

- Grand Prix Circuit (2014–2023)
- Location: Sirius, Krasnodar Krai, Russia
- Coordinates: 43°24′37″N 39°58′5.78″E
- Capacity: 55,000
- Owner: Rosgonki
- Broke ground: July 2011; 15 years ago
- Opened: 21 September 2014; 11 years ago
- Architect: Hermann Tilke
- Former names: Sochi Autodrom (September 2014–March 2024)
- Major events: Current: SMP F4 Winter Series (2025–present); Former: Formula One; Russian Grand Prix (2014–2021); WTCR Race of Russia (2021); Russian Circuit Racing Series (2014–2016, 2018–2019, 2021, 2023); Ferrari Challenge Europe (2016); TCR International Series (2015–2016); SMP F4 Championship (2015–2017)
- Website: https://siriusautodrom.ru

Permanent Circuit (2014–present)
- Length: 2.313 km (1.437 mi)
- Turns: 11
- Race lap record: 1:01.805 ( (Russia) Vladimir Verkholantsev, Tatuus F4-T421, 2025, F4)

Grand Prix Circuit (2014–2023)
- Length: 5.848 km (3.634 mi)
- Turns: 18
- Race lap record: 1:35.761 ( (United Kingdom) Lewis Hamilton, Mercedes W10, 2019, F1)

The Sirius Autodrom (Russian: Сириус Автодром, romanized: Sirius Avtodrom), known before 2024 as Sochi Autodrom (Russian: Сочи Автодром, romanized: Sochi Avtodrom) and originally as the Sochi International Street Circuit and the Sochi Olympic Park Circuit, is a 2.313 km (1.437 mi) permanent race track in the settlement of Sirius next to the Black Sea resort city of Sochi in Krasnodar Krai, Russia.

The circuit ran around a former Olympic complex, the Sochi Olympic Park site, scene of the 2014 Winter Olympic Games. The TCR International Series raced at Sochi in 2015 and 2016.

The inaugural World Championship Russian Grand Prix took place in 2014, with the circuit hosting the Grand Prix up to 2021. The contract was terminated before the 2022 edition due to the Russian invasion of Ukraine.

== Development ==
Earlier the International Olympic Committee was given the power to delay the race until 2015 if preparations for the race interfered with the Winter Olympics, though the Games started without interruption. In October 2011, the Russian government set aside US$195.4 million for the construction of the circuit.

The construction of the Sochi Olympic Park Circuit marked the end of a thirty-year campaign for a Russian Grand Prix, with plans for a "Grand Prix of the Soviet Union" originating as early as 1983 before being abandoned for "bureaucratic reasons" and several failed attempts in the intervening years. The circuit received its final approval from the FIA in August 2014.

== The circuit ==
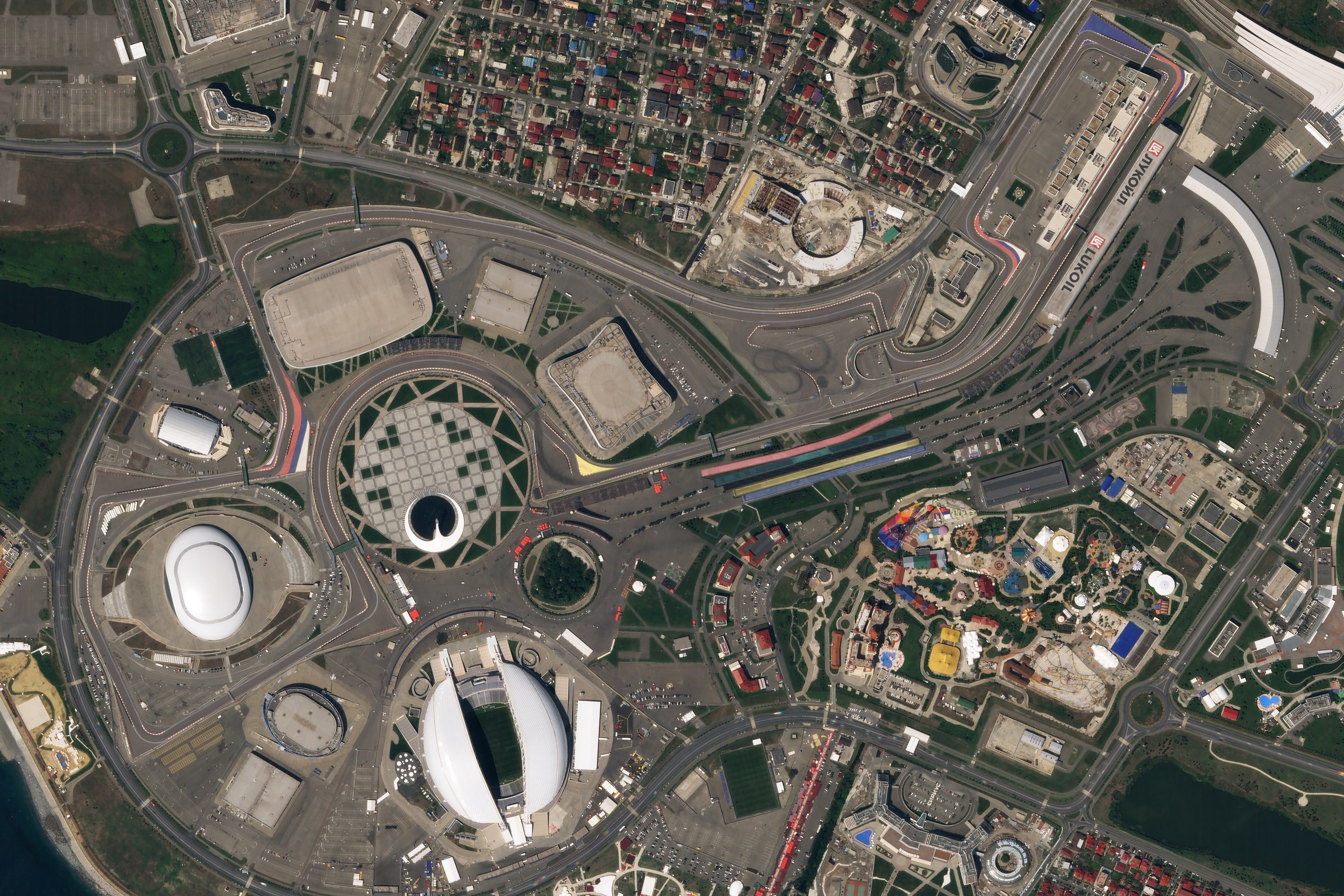
The circuit and the Olympic Park, as it appeared in 2018

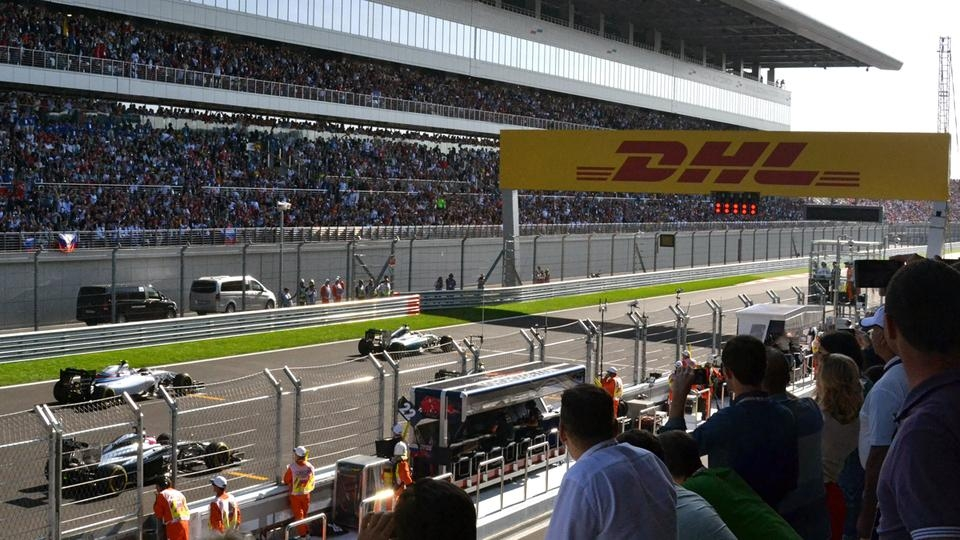
The start of the 2014 Russian Grand Prix

The 5.848 km (3.634 mi) circuit was the fifth-longest circuit on the 2021 Formula One calendar, behind Spa-Francorchamps in Belgium, Jeddah Corniche Circuit in Saudi Arabia, Baku City Circuit in Azerbaijan and Silverstone in the UK. The circuit is built around the Sochi Olympic Park, that is the coastal cluster of Olympic venues built for the 2014 Winter Olympics that have hosted competitions in ice hockey, speed skating, curling, figure skating, short track etc., and Fisht Olympic Stadium where opening and closing ceremonies were held. The surface was not laid until after the closing ceremony of the Olympics.

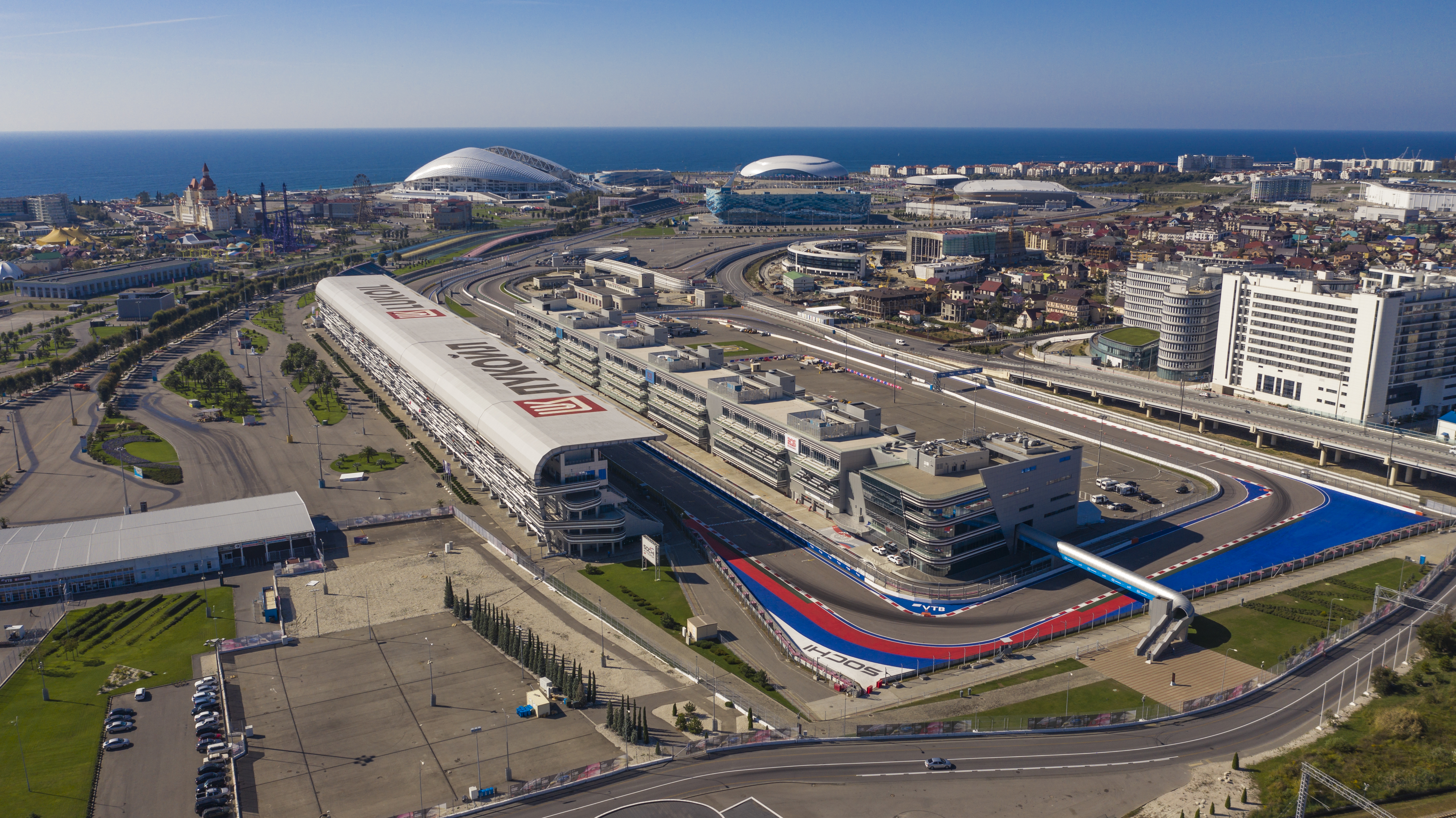
Aerial view of the Sochi Autodrome from the final corner

The circuit, designed by German architect Hermann Tilke, has the start grid on the northern edge of the Olympic Park next to the railway station, heading southwest towards the Black Sea coast. Then it runs along the outer edge of the central Sochi Medals Plaza, that is the podium for Olympic medal ceremonies. The long Turn 3 has been compared to Turn 8 in Istanbul Park. Then, the track circles the plaza counterclockwise and makes three turns around the Bolshoy Ice Dome. Then follow series of tight corners before turning north where the track skirts the edge of the Olympic Park, above the main Olympic Village and the Adler Arena Skating Center. Then it passes the skating and curling centres, before funneling up behind the pit paddock toward the train station, and completing a circuit with two ninety-degree right turns. The circuit held the Russian Grand Prix from 2014 to 2021.

The circuit was initially planned to be included in the 2022 Formula One calendar, but the Russian Grand Prix was suspended on 24 February 2022, then it was cancelled on 1 March 2022, due to the Russian invasion of Ukraine.

With international championships leaving Russia it was decided to dismantle the 5.848 km (3.634 mi) big circuit, leaving only the 2.313 km (1.437 mi) short layout where turn 1 is connected to turn 13. The last race at the old layout, which was the Russian Endurance Cup, took place 4 November 2023; the grand prix circuit was closed 6 November and the shorter layout was started to be primarily used from 15 December.

On 1 April 2024, the Sochi Autodrom was renamed to Sirius Autodrom, after the Sirius urban-type settlement which was built near the Olympic Park back in 2020.

== Events ==
Current

- January: SMP F4 Winter Series
- December: SMP F4 Winter Series

Former

- Ferrari Challenge Europe (2016)
- FIA Formula 2 Championship
  - Sochi Formula 2 round (2018–2021)
- FIA Formula 3 Championship (2019, 2021)
- Formula One
  - Russian Grand Prix (2014–2021)
- G-Drive SMP F4 Cup (2024)
- GP2 Series (2014–2015)
- GP3 Series (2014–2015, 2018)
- Russian Circuit Racing Series (2014–2016, 2018–2019, 2021, 2023)
- SMP F4 Championship (2015–2017)
- TCR International Series (2015–2016)
- World Touring Car Cup
  - FIA WTCR Race of Russia (2021)

== Lap records ==
As of December 2025, the fastest official race lap records at the Sirius Autodrom are listed as:

Class/Category	Time	Driver	Vehicle	Event
Permanent Circuit (2014–present): 2.313 km (1.437 mi)
Formula 4	1:01.805	(Russia) Vladimir Verkholantsev	Tatuus F4-T421	2025 2nd Sochi SMP F4 Winter Series round
Grand Prix Circuit (2014–2023): 5.848 km (3.634 mi)
Formula One	1:35.761	(United Kingdom) Lewis Hamilton	Mercedes AMG F1 W10 EQ Power+	2019 Russian Grand Prix
GP2	1:46.407	(Belgium) Stoffel Vandoorne	Dallara GP2/11	2014 Sochi GP2 round
FIA F2	1:50.501	(United Kingdom) George Russell	Dallara F2 2018	2018 Sochi Formula 2 round
GP3	1:52.459	(France) Esteban Ocon	Dallara GP3/13	2015 Sochi GP3 round
FIA F3	1:55.513	(United Kingdom) Jake Hughes	Dallara F3 2019	2019 Sochi Formula 3 round
Formula 4	2:10.435	(Netherlands) Jarno Opmeer (Note: Jarno Opmeer took the same lap time in both races of this round.)	Tatuus F4-T014	2016 Sochi SMP F4 round
Ferrari Challenge	2:13.849	(Germany) Björn Grossmann	Ferrari 458 Challenge Evo	2016 Ferrari Challenge Europe Sochi round
GT4	2:19.468	(Russia) Aleksandr Maslennikov	KTM X-Bow GT4 Evo	2021 Sochi RCRS round
TCR Touring Car	2:20.107	(Russia) Dmitry Bragin	Audi RS 3 LMS TCR	2021 Sochi RCRS round
Super 2000	2:23.719	(Russia) Vitaly Larionov	BMW 320si	2015 Sochi RCRS round

== See also ==
- 2014 Winter Olympics
