= Russian Circuit Racing Series =

Touring car racing series

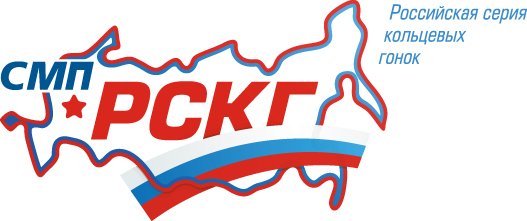
- Category: Touring cars
- Country: Russia
- Inaugural season: 2004
- Constructors: BMW, LADA, SEAT, Renault, Ford, Kia, Volkswagen, Honda, Subaru, Peugeot
- Tyre suppliers: Yokohama
- Drivers' champion: (Russia) Dmitry Bragin
- Teams' champion: (Russia) TAIF Motorsport
- Official website: raf-rcrs.ru

The Russian Circuit Racing Series (RCRS) is a national Russian racing series created in 2004. It started with four classes: touring, super-production, touring-light, and national class; and national-junior was added in 2015. Sergey Krylov was the championship's promoter its beginning, until Oleg Petrikov became promoter of the series in 2014.

== Circuits ==
Map	Circuit	City	Season
	ADM Raceway	Moscow	2004–2007, 2012, 2019, 2023—2024
	Autodrom Saint Petersburg	St Petersburg	2011
	Dmitrovsky Autopolygon	Dmitrov	2009
	Fort Grozny Autodrom	Grozny	2016–2026
	Igora Drive	Novozhilovo	2020–2026
	Kazan Ring	Kazan	2011–2026
	Kursk Ring	Kursk	2008–2011
	Lipetsk Ring	Lipetsk	2009–2010
	Luzhniki Olympic Complex	Moscow	2008, 2011
	Moscow Raceway	Volokolamsk	2012–2026
	Neva Ring	Saint Petersburg	2004–2006
	NRING Circuit	Bogorodsk	2010–2026
	Orlovsky Ring	Oryol	2008
	Red Ring	Krasnoyarsk	2009–2010
	Smolensk Ring	Safonovo	2011–2026
	Sochi Autodrom	Sirius	2014—2016, 2018–2019, 2021, 2023
	Tolyatti Ring	Tolyatti	2013
	Vorobyovy Gory	Moscow	2005–2006

== Classes ==
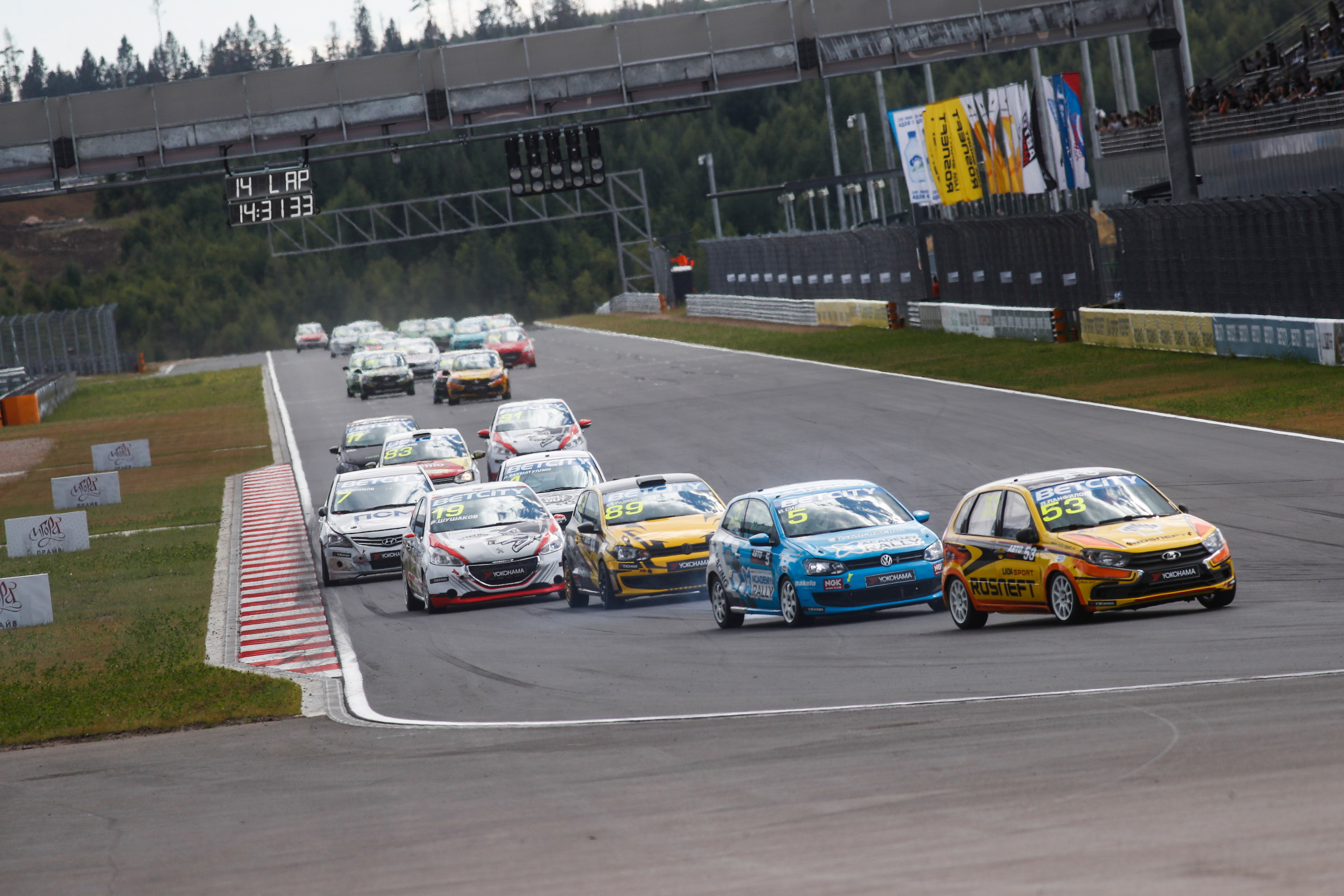
RCRS, Touring-Light and S1600, 2020

- Touring: The international category where cars with two-litre engines and some physical alterations compete. Typical representatives include: BMW 320, Audi A4, Subaru BRZ, Honda Civic and Accord, Chevrolet Lacetti and Cruze, SEAT León.
- TCR Russian Series: In 2015 it was announced that cars under the new TCR regulations (as used in the TCR International Series) will be eligible to compete alongside the Touring class, but also have their standalone classification. Typical representatives include: SEAT León Cup Racer, Audi RS3 LMS TCR, LADA Vesta TCR and Renault Megane RS

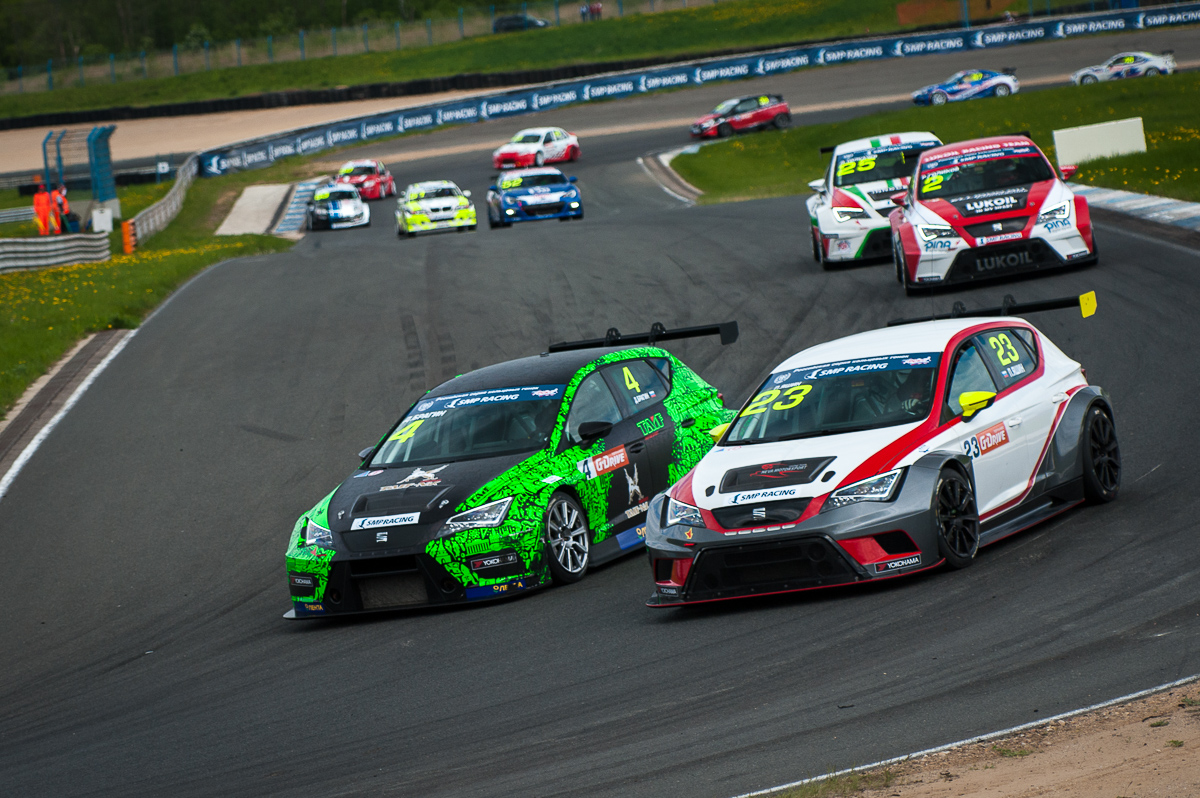
RCRS, Touring and Super-Production, 2016

- Touring-Light: Cars with 1600cc engines compete in this class. Typical representatives include: Ford Fiesta, VW Polo, Lada Kalina, Kia Rio, Renault Twingo Sport, Peugeot 208 GTI.
- Super-Production: This is an international category where cars with the two litre engine compete. Typical representatives: Honda Civic, Subaru BRZ, Lada Granta.
- National class: 1600сс engine category for cars assembled in the territory of the Russian Federation. Typical representatives: Lada Kalina, Lada 112, Lada Riva, Renault Logan/Sandero, VW Polo, Kia Rio.
- National-Junior class: Category for drivers from 12 to 16 years old. Typical representatives: Lada Kalina, Lada Samara, VW Polo.

== Champions ==
Season	Touring		Touring-Light		Super-Production		S1600		S1600 Junior		SMP GT4 Russia		CN Sportprototype	
Season	Drivers' Champion	Teams' Champion	Drivers' Champion	Teams' Champion	Drivers' Champion	Teams' Champion	Drivers' Champion	Teams' Champion	Drivers' Champion	Teams' Champion	Drivers' Champion	Teams' Champion	Drivers' Champion	Teams' Champion
Russian Circuit Racing Series
2025	Mikhail Simonov	Lukoil Racing Twins Team	Nikolay Karamyshev	Bragin Racing Team	Leonid Panfilov	LADA Sport Rosneft	Kay Richard Schick	Powerfull	Not held		Irina Sidorkova	SMP Racing by Capital RT	Andrey Gromov	Piter Rally
2024	Mikhail Simonov	Lukoil Racing SMP Racing	Andrey Maslennikov	Rally Academy	Kirill Ladygin	LADA Sport Rosneft	Vasily Korablev	GTE Racing Team	Not held		Aleksey Nesov	X Motorsport Team Garis	Andrey Gromov	None
2023	Dmitry Bragin	Lukoil Racing	Mikhail Simonov	Bragin Racing Team	Mikhail Mityaev	LADA Sport Rosneft	Artem Antonov	None	Not held		Rinat Salikhov	Yadro Motorsport	Aleksandr Dudarev	None
2022	Dmitry Bragin	TAIF Motorsport	Nikolay Karamyshev	Lukoil Racing Rally Academy	Ivan Chubarov	LADA Sport Rosneft	Rustam Fatkhutdinov	AKHMAT Racing Team	Not held		Anton Nemkin	CapitalRT MotorSharks	DNA	None
2021	Kirill Ladygin	LADA Sport Rosneft	Ivan Chubarov	LADA Sport Rosneft	Vadim Antipov	Sofit-Racing Team	Petr Plotnikov	Innostage - AG Team	Artem Antonov	RUMOS RACING	Denis Remenyako	CapitalRT MotorSharks	Sergey Ievlev	None
2020	Kirill Ladygin	LADA Sport Rosneft	Vladimir Sheshenin	LADA Sport Rosneft	Vladislav Nezvankin	LADA Sport Rosneft	Petr Plotnikov	AKHMAT Racing Team	Egor Fokin	Rally Academy	Denis Remenyako	Capital Racing Team	Pavel Kuzminov	None
2019	Dmitry Bragin	TAIF Motorsport	Vladimir Cherevan	Rally Academy	Andrey Petukhov	LADA Sport Rosneft	Mikhail Mityaev	LADA Sport Rosneft	Petr Plotnikov	Rally Academy	Not held			
2018	Dmitry Bragin	Lukoil Racing Team	Grigory Burlutskiy	Carville Racing	Mikhail Mityaev	LADA Sport Rosneft	Pavel Kalmanovich	AG Team	Irina Sidorkova	Rally Academy	Not held			
2017	Dmitry Bragin	LADA Sport Rosneft	Denis Bulatov	Podmoskovie Motorsport	Mikhail Mityaev	LADA Sport Rosneft	Aydar Nuriev	Rally Academy	Maxim Kornilkov	Rally Academy	Not held			
2016	Dmitry Bragin	Lukoil Racing	Dmitry Bragin	LADA Sport Rosneft	Maksim Chernev	URT Subaru Team Lukoil	Vladimir Sheshenin	B-Tuning Pro Racing Team	Anton Gavrichenkov	None	Not held			
2015	Aleksey Dudukalo	Lukoil Racing	Dmitry Bragin	LADA Sport Rosneft	Maksim Chernev	Innocenti Lada Sport	Dmitry Bragin	STK Taifmotorsport	Gleb Kuznetsov	None	Not held			
2014	Mikhail Grachev	AMG Motorsport	Boris Shulmeyster	Sports Racing Technologies	Andrei Maslennikov	Ralf-Car Team	Vladimir Sheshenin	Lukoil Racing Team Lada	Not held					
Russian Racing Championship
2013	Mikhail Grachev	AMG Motorsport	Pavel Kalmanovich	Lukoil Racing Team Lada	Vladimir Strelchenko	Ralf-Car Team	Egor Sanin	KGOO STK MX-Autosport	Not held					
2012	Aleksandr Frolov	TNK Racing Team	Mikhail Grachev	PSM Team80	Vasiliy Krichevskiy	Khimki Motorsport	Vladimir Sheshenin	AvtoVAZ PROO	Not held					
Russian Touring Car Championship
2011	Aleksandr Frolov	Orenburg Racing	Aleksandr Sotnikov	Lukoil Racing	Viktor Kozankov	Honda Cheryomushki	Vadim Meshcherjakov	Autoclod-afso	Not held					
2010	Mikhail Ukhov	TNK Racing	Mikhail Kozlovskiy	Lukoil Racing	Viktor Kozankov	Honda Cheryomushki	Vasiliy Mezentsev	Krasnoe koltso	Not held					
2009	Vladimir Strelchenko	Khimki Motorsport	Aleksey Dudukalo	Lukoil Racing	Mikhail Zasadych	Prology Racing Team	Aleksey Filimonov	None	Not held					
2008	Aleksey Basov	RED WINGS	Aleksey Dudukalo	Lukoil Racing	Pavel Fedorov	Prology Racing Team	Aleksandr Zheltov	TAXI-2 Technical Consulting	Not held					
2007	Aleksandr Lvov	Golden Motors	Aleksandr Sotnikov	Dinamo Autosport	Aleksey Basov	STK Rally Podmoskovie	Nikita Vasilyev	Jackpot	Not held					
2006	Vladimir Labazov	AVTODOM Racing	Anton Markin	Dinamo Autosport	Vladimir Cherevan	Korus Autosport	Igor Fillipov	Kaluga Motorsport	Not held					
2005	Vladimir Nechaev	AVTODOM Racing	Aleksandr Sotnikov	Dinamo Autosport	Ilya Burenko	Forza Sport	Artem Kazyavin	SKP	Not held					
2004	Grigoriy Komarov	MTS AC Racing	Vladimir Labazov	Dinamo Autosport	Not held		Roman Kozyavin	SPK Tolyatti	Not held					
