= Vladimir Strelchenko =

Russian politician (born 1964)

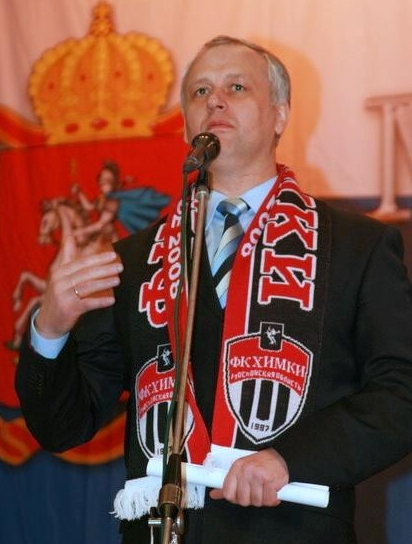
Strelchenko in 2008

Vladimir Vladimirovich Strelchenko (Russian: Владимир Владимирович Стрельченко; born 25 April 1964 in Novosibirsk) was mayor of Khimki (Russian town in Moscow Oblast, in the vicinity of Moscow) since 2005 to 2012. He had made his career in the Soviet and Russian army, participating in the Soviet–Afghan War in the late 1980s and retiring in 1999 as Colonel. Subsequently, he worked as an official in the Moscow and Moscow Oblast governments. From 2005 to 2010, he was a president of FC Khimki.

== Motorsport career ==
Since 2005, Strelchenko is competing in RTCC, he is Champion of Russia in Touring class (2009) and Cup of Russia winner in Super Production (2013).

Sporting positions
Preceded by Aleksey Basov	Russian Circuit Racing Series; Champion; 2008	Succeeded by Mikhail Ukhov
Preceded by Vasiliy Krichevskiy	Russian Circuit Racing Series; Super Production Champion; 2013	Succeeded by Andrei Maslennikov
