= Anton Nemkin =

Russian politician (born 1983)

Anton Nemkin MP
- Антон Немкин
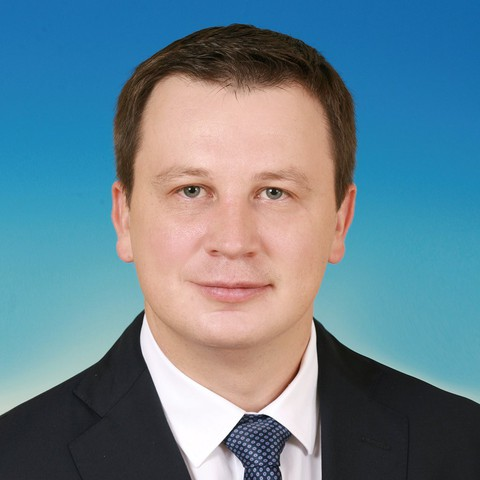

Member of the State Duma (Party List Seat)
- Incumbent
- Assumed office 12 October 2021

Personal details
- Born: Anton Igorevich Nemkin; 22 August 1983 (age 43) Maykop, Adyghe Autonomous Oblast, RSFSR, USSR
- Party: United Russia
- Education: FSB Academy

Anton Igorevich Nemkin (Russian: Антон Игоревич Немкин; born 22 August 1983) is a Russian politician. He is a deputy of the 8th State Duma.

Until 2014, Nemkin served at the Federal Security Service. From 2017 to 2021, he was registered as an individual entrepreneur. In 2018, Nemkin founded a fund titled "Sochi Digital Valley" with an estimated volume of private investment of 250 million rubles. Since September 2021, he has served as the deputy of the 8th State Duma.

== Racing ==
In 2017–2018, he was a pilot of the Russian auto racing series Mitjet 2L and piloted a racing car Honda Civic. In 2017, he created the "Motor Sharks" racing team. In 2019, he became a part of the Russian Circuit Racing Series.

Nemkin was appointed vice president of the Russian Automobile Federation on 28 May 2025.

== Sanctions ==
He is one of the members of the State Duma the United States Treasury sanctioned on 24 March 2022 in response to the 2022 Russian invasion of Ukraine.

He was sanctioned by Canada under the Special Economic Measures Act (S.C. 1992, c. 17) in relation to the Russian invasion of Ukraine for Grave Breach of International Peace and Security, and by the UK government in 2022 in relation to Russo-Ukrainian War.
