= Hyundai i30 =

Small family car

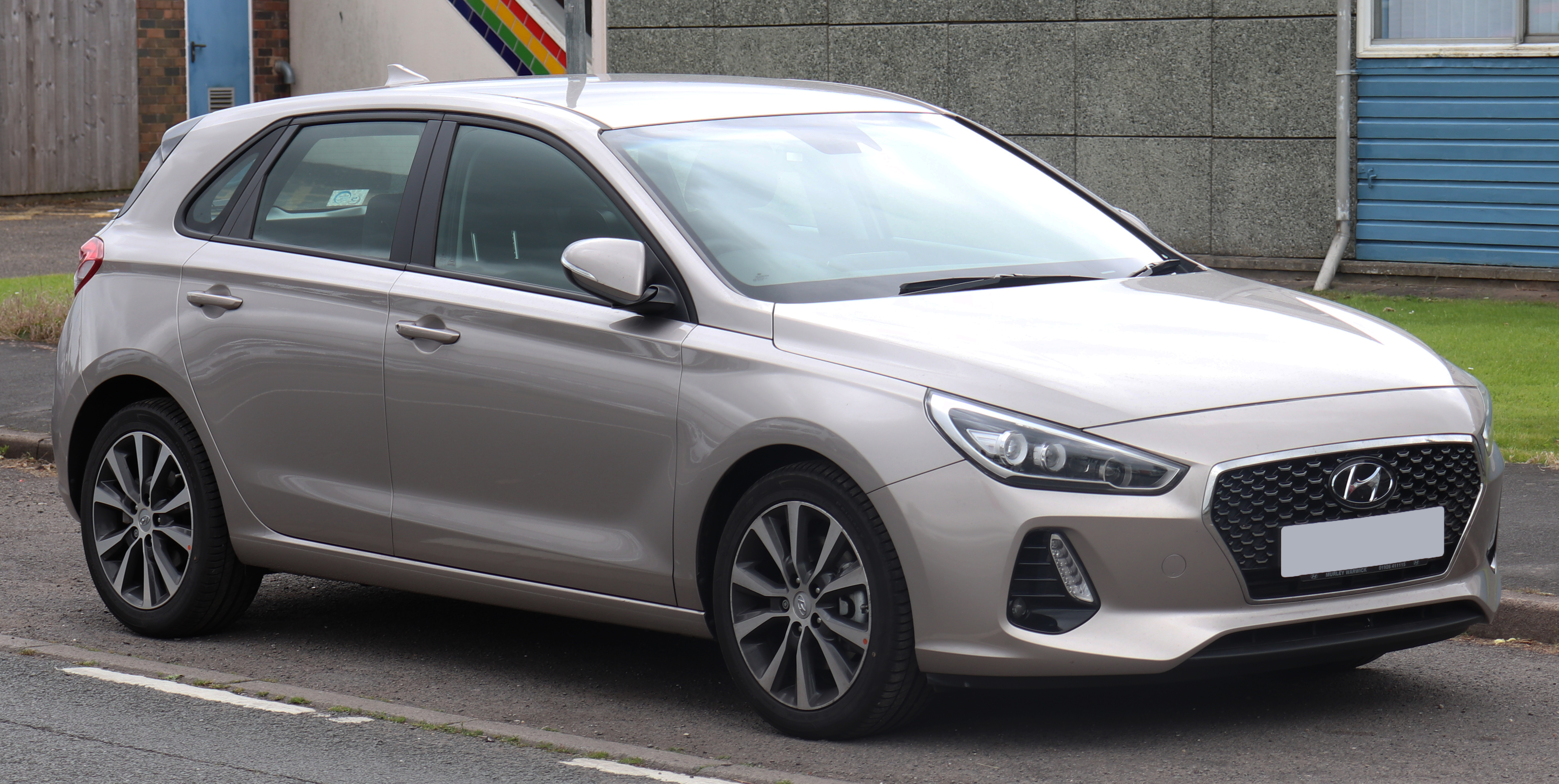

Overview
- Manufacturer: Hyundai
- Also called: Hyundai Elantra Touring (North America, 2008–2012); Hyundai Elantra GT (North America, 2012–2020)
- Production: 2007–present
- Model years: 2009–2020 (North America)

Body and chassis
- Class: Compact car/small family car (C)
- Body style: 3-door hatchback (2012–2017); 5-door hatchback 5-door estate 5-door liftback (2017–present)
- Layout: Front-engine, front-wheel-drive
- Related: Hyundai Elantra; Kia Ceed; Kia Forte

The Hyundai i30 is a small family car manufactured by the South Korean manufacturer Hyundai Motor Company since 2007. The i30 shares its platform with the Kia Ceed, available as a three-door hatchback (2012–2017), five-door hatchback, five-door estate and five-door liftback (2017–present), with a choice of three petrol engines and two diesel engines, either with manual or automatic transmission.

The i30 was marketed alongside the fifth-generation Hyundai Elantra in the United States and Canada until the end of 2020. While initially the i30 wagon was sold as the Elantra Touring, in 2012 it was replaced by the i30 hatchback, carrying Elantra GT badging. The second-generation i30 was introduced in September 2011 at the Frankfurt Motor Show.

== First generation (FD; 2007) ==
First generation
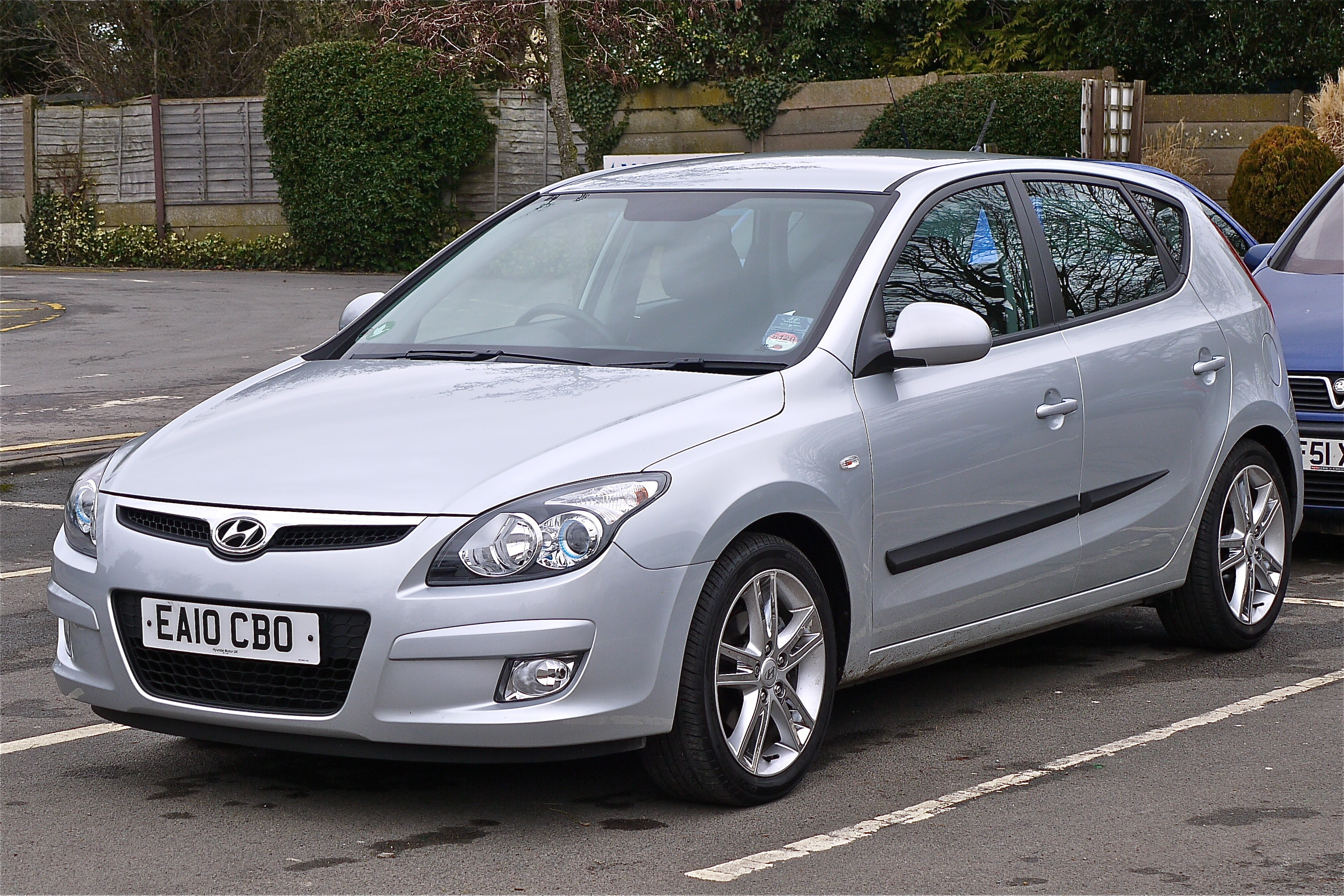
- Pre-facelift

Overview
- Model code: FD
- Also called: Hyundai Elantra Touring (North America, wagon)
- Production: 2007–2012
- Model years: 2009–2012 (North America)
- Assembly: South Korea: Ulsan; Czech Republic: Nošovice; China: Beijing (Beijing Hyundai); Egypt: Cairo (Ghabbour Group)
- Designer: Thomas Bürkle

Body and chassis
- Body style: 5-door hatchback 5-door estate (i30cw)
- Platform: Hyundai-Kia J4 platform
- Related: Hyundai Elantra (HD); Kia Cee'd (ED)

Powertrain
- Engine: Petrol: 1.4 L Gamma CVVT DOHC 16v I4; 1.6 L Gamma CVVT DOHC 16v I4; 2.0 L Beta II CVVT DOHC 16v I4; Diesel: 1.6 L U CRDi-VGT DOHC 16v I4 (turbo); 2.0 L D CRDi-VGT SOHC 16v I4
- Transmission: 5-speed manual 6-speed manual 4-speed automatic

Dimensions
- Wheelbase: 2,650 mm (104.3 in) (hatchback); 2,700 mm (106.3 in) (wagon)
- Length: 4,245 mm (167.1 in) (hatchback); 4,475 mm (176.2 in) (wagon)
- Width: 1,775 mm (69.9 in)
- Height: 1,480 mm (58.3 in) (hatchback); 1,565 mm (61.6 in) (wagon)

The first generation Hyundai i30 was announced during 2006 Paris Motor Show by the Hyundai Arnejs concept.

A handful of pre-series cars were completed in late 2006, with series production commencing in 2007. It was introduced at the Geneva Motor Show in March 2007, and released during mid-2007 for Europe and Australia.

It was conceived in Rüsselsheim, Germany, at Hyundai's Design and Technical Centre.

The i30 named as safest imported mid size car in Argentina.

The first generation i30 was officially launched in Malaysia in July 2009 where two engines were available: 1.6L (manual and auto) and 2.0L (auto only).

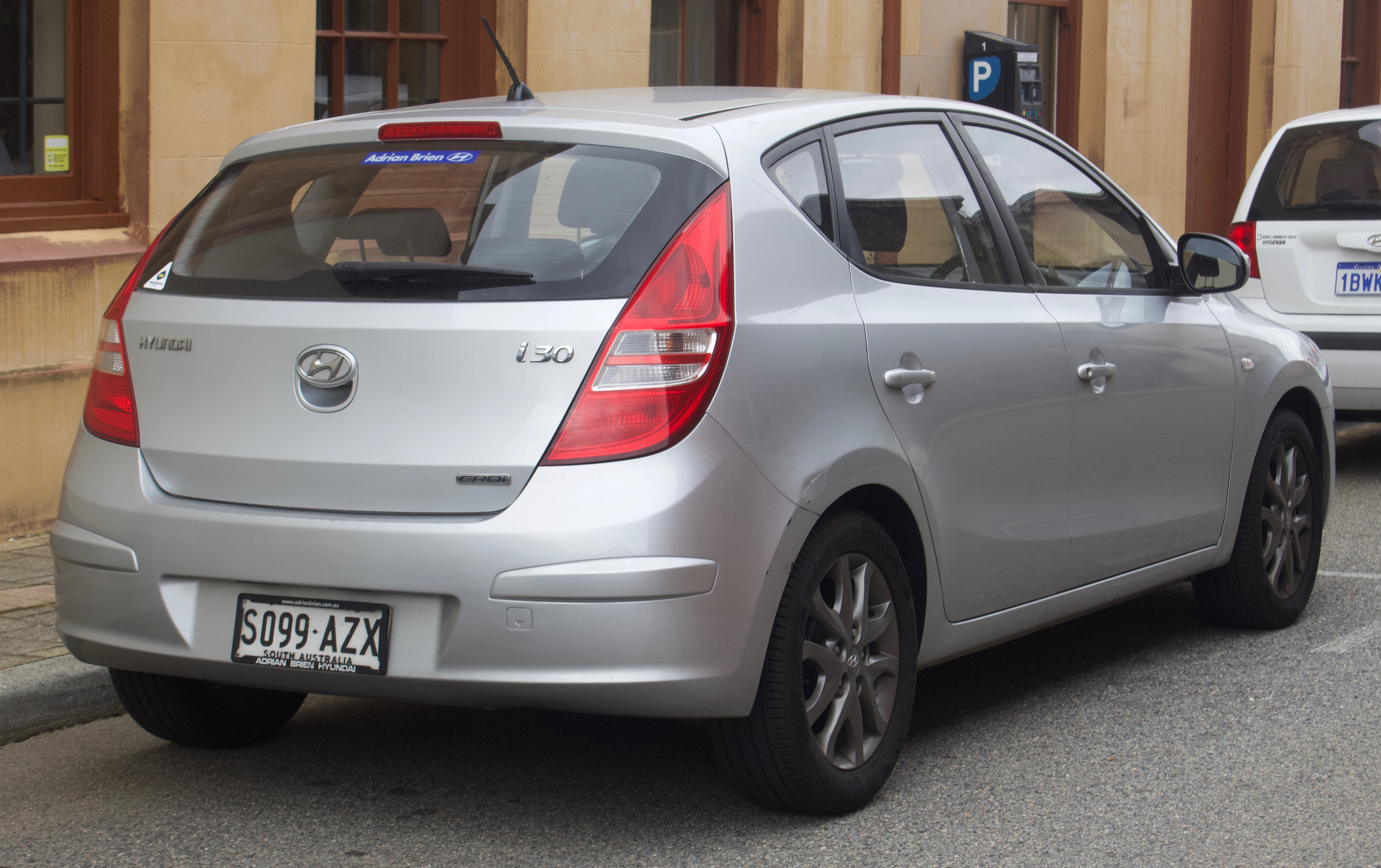
Hatchback (pre-facelift)

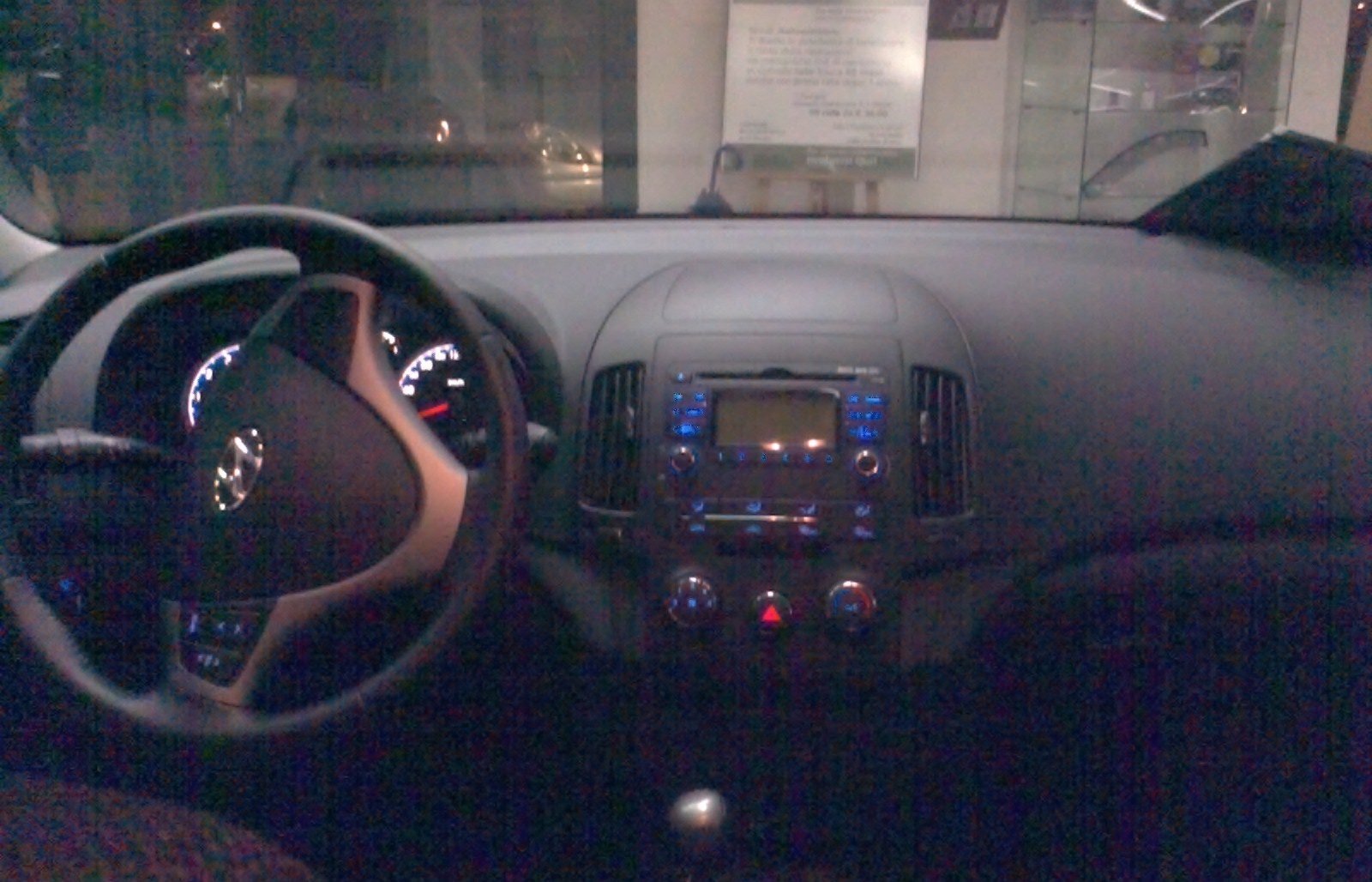
Interior

=== i30cw ===
The i30cw (a.k.a. i30 estate) was released in South Korea at the Seoul Motor Show in 2007, and is marketed worldwide under slightly different names.

This model also entered the North American market for the 2009 model year, as the Elantra Touring. It is a larger, roomier version of the i30 hatchback. The i30 cw's maximum cargo volume is 65 cubic feet (1,800 L).

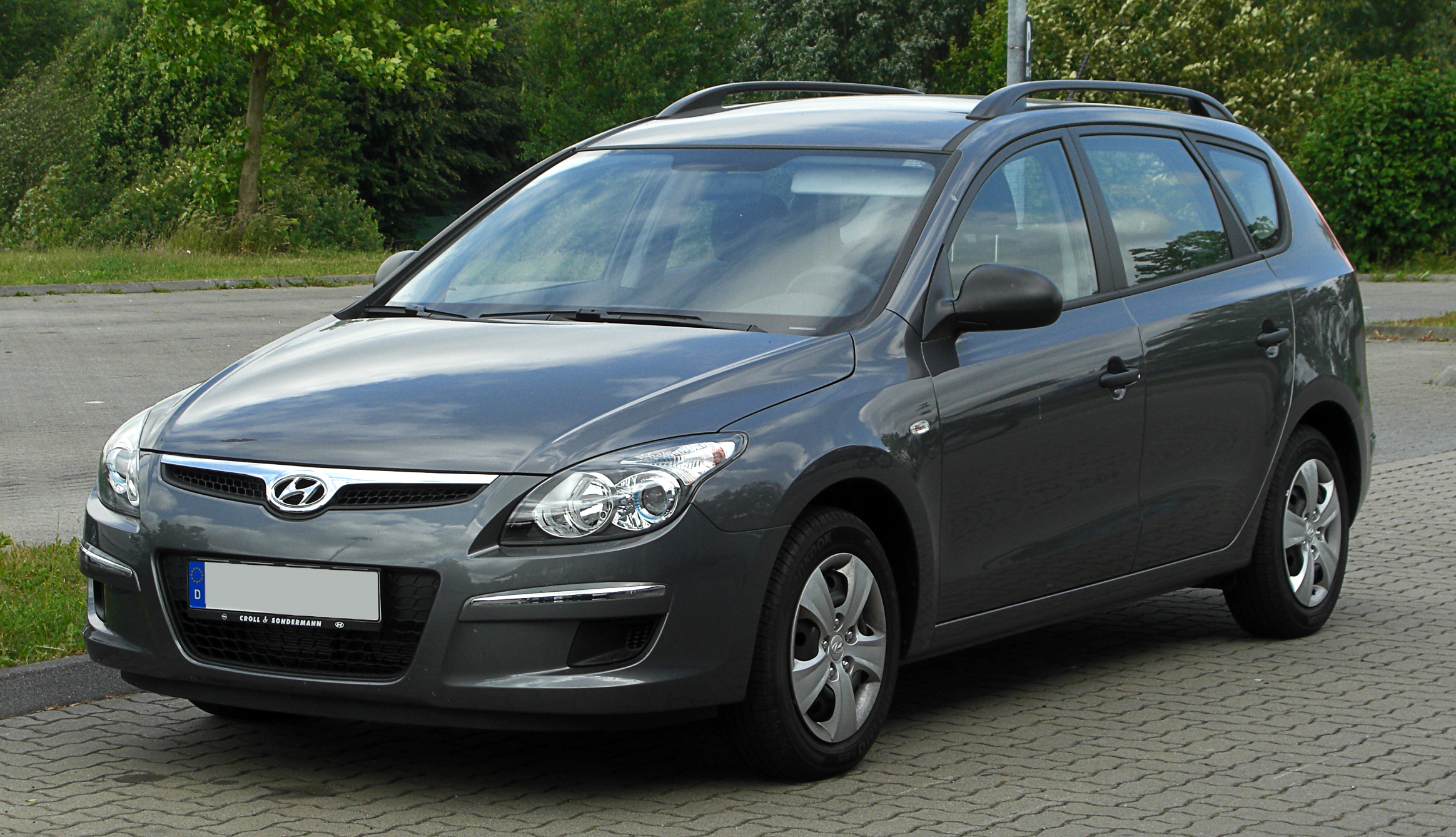
i30cw (pre-facelift)

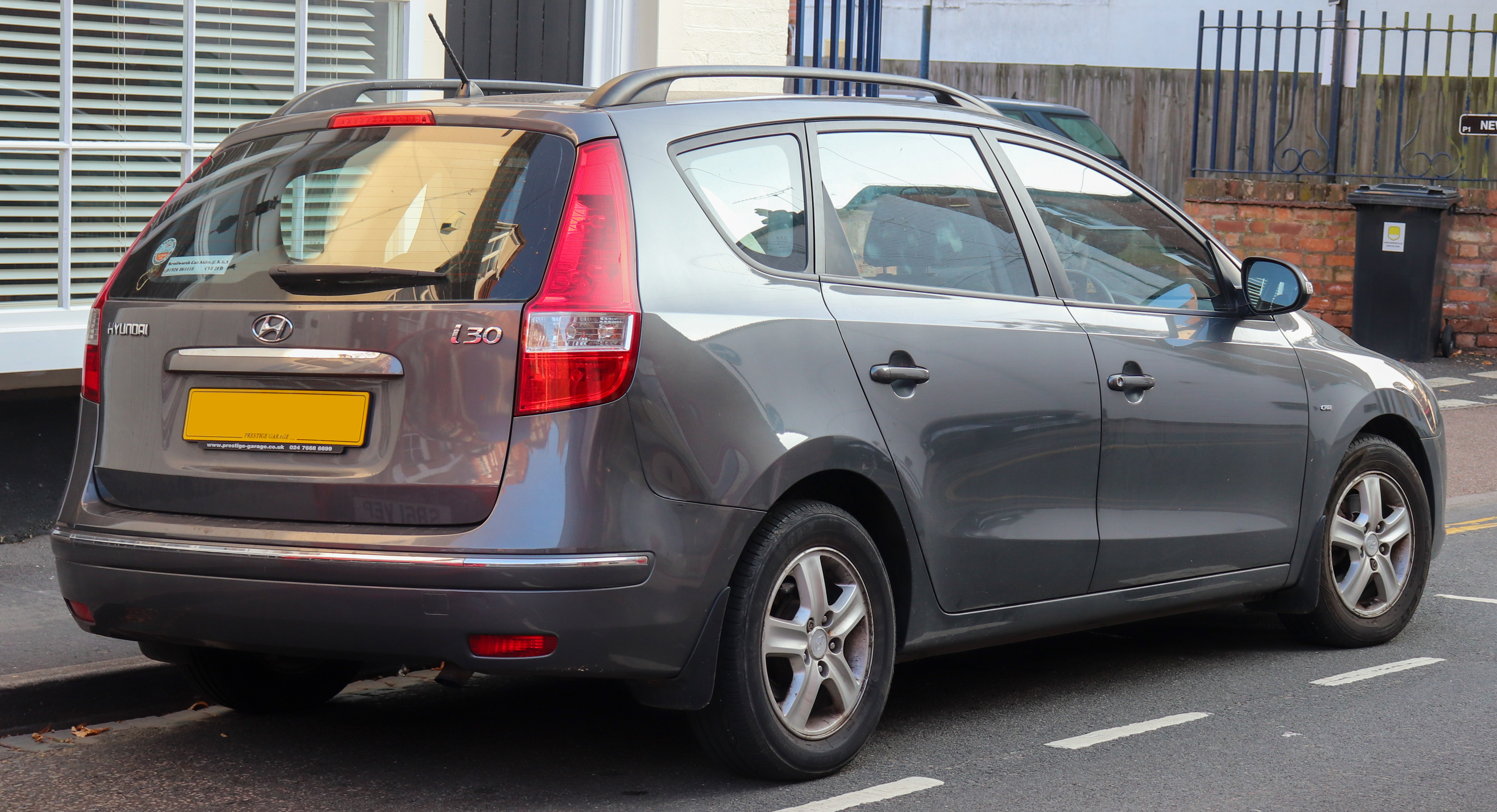
i30cw (pre-facelift)

For the 2012 model year, the Elantra Touring wagon came with a 2.0-litre inline-four producing 138 hp (103 kW) and 136 lb⋅ft (184 N⋅m). The American EPA rates consumption at 23 MPG in the city and 30 MPG on the highway (10 L/100 km and 7.8 L/100 km respectively). The Elantra Touring comes equipped with either a five-speed manual transmission without hill assist feature or a four-speed torque-converter non-manumatic automatic transmission. In Australia, at least, these have beam type rear suspension and not the independent link type found in the sedan.

The Hyundai Elantra Touring was originally available in either Base or Limited trim, each offering a similar level of equipment to its Hyundai Elantra sedan counterpart. Later the model names were changed to GLS and SE, with the SE being the more equipped model.

=== Facelift ===
Facelift was presentet at 2010. Lepizig Motor Show.

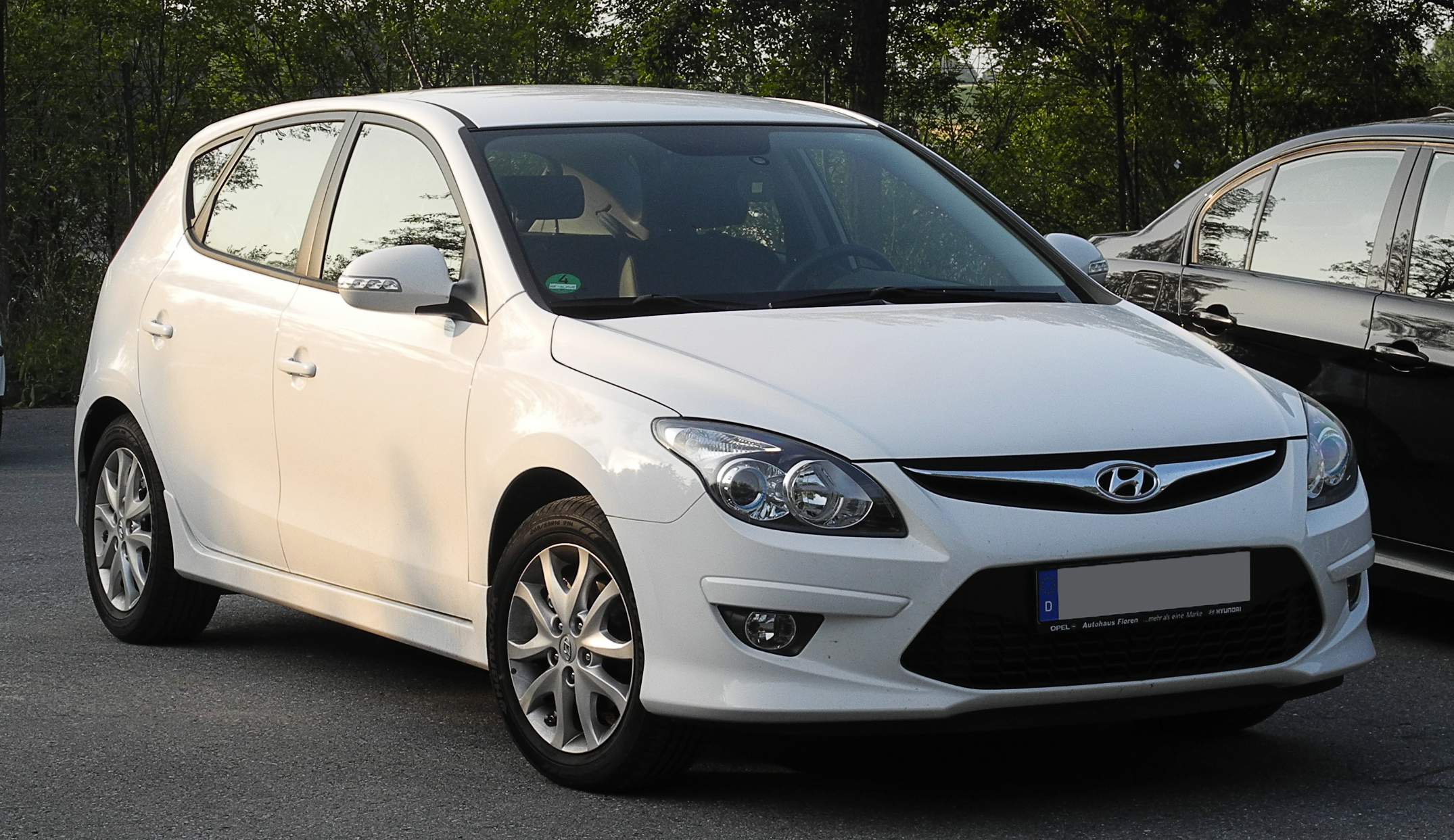
Hatchback (facelift)

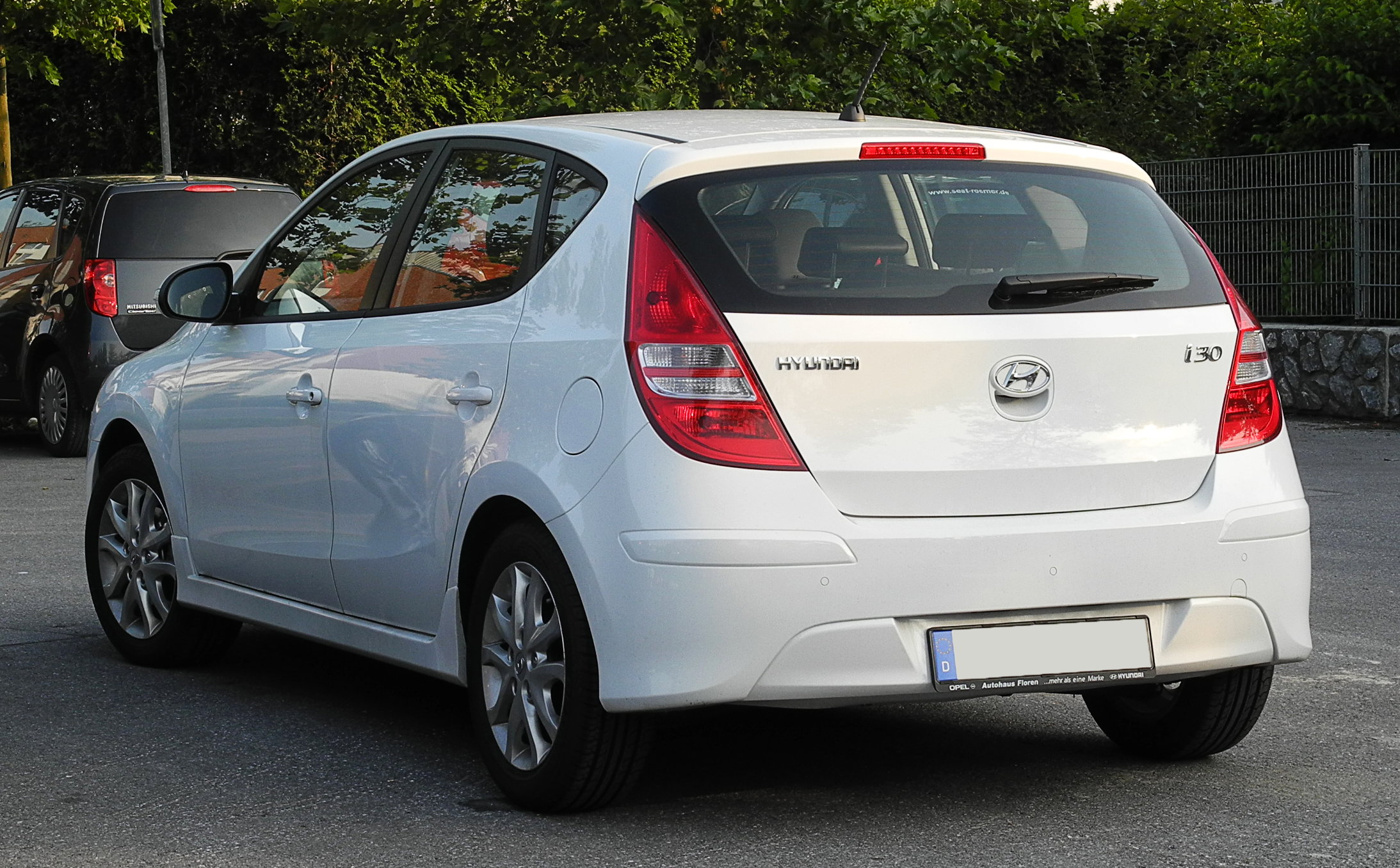
Hatchback (facelift)

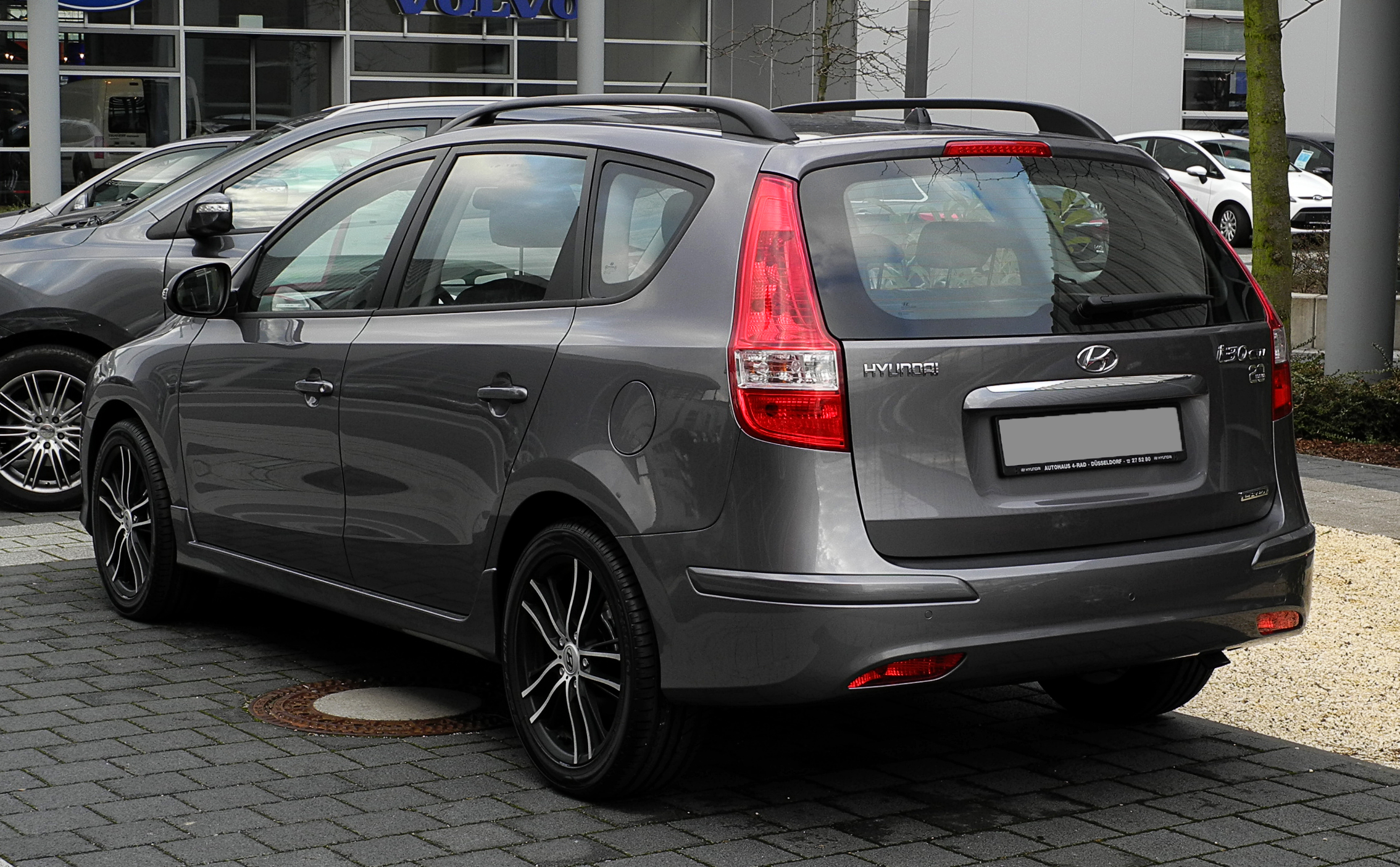
i30cw (facelift)

=== i30 blue ===
The i30 blue is a variation with Start&Stop technology (called Idle Stop and Go). United Kingdom versions came with 1.4L, 1.6L petrol or a 1.6L diesel engine, in both five-door hatchback or estate body styles. CO_{2} emission rating for the 1.6L petrol models were reduced to 142g/km (from 152g/km).

The car was unveiled at the 2009 Geneva Motor Show, and was produced in Nosovice, Czech Republic. It went on sale in the United Kingdom in January 2008. and had ISG as an option, costing £200.

=== Reception ===
In Australia, the Hyundai i30 won the 'Best Mid size Car Under $28,000'. At the time of its release in the end of 2007, the 1.6L CRDi i30 was the cheapest diesel car in Australia, coming in at just $21,490AUD for the basic (SX) model. The model above (SLX) adds Climate Control, trip computer, leather gear knob and steering wheel (with audio controls), cruise control (from 2008), body colour door handles, rear armrest with cup holders, six speakers (up from four), adjustable lumbar support for the driver, fog lights and 16" alloy wheels. Australian i30 models feature a unique suspension tune for Australian road conditions.

2007

Car of the Year for 2007 by CarsGuide with the 1.6L CRDi model winning the Green Car of the Year award.

Hyundai's i30 Diesel Picked as Australia's Car of the Year.

2008

'Best Mid-size Car Under $28,000' by Australia's Best Cars to the Hyundai i30 SX petrol and i30 CRDi Turbo Diesel

The Hyundai i30 was chosen as 2008 Car of the Year in Spain.

2009

Best Family Hatch in New Zealand

The Hyundai i30 was judged the Supreme Winner in the 2009 AA Motoring Excellence Awards in New Zealand.

2010

Most Satisfying Car In Britain.

The i30 won the Driver Power Top 100 survey to be named by owners as the most satisfying car to own. Auto Express magazine surveyed the reliability and satisfaction survey, completed by over 23,000 drivers.

The Hyundai Elantra Touring Named Top 10 Family Cars by Kelley Blue Book (KBB) in the United States.

2012

Best Family Car. The i30 won the Best Family Car of the Year on 14 October 2012, at the Glasgow Thistle.

Euro NCAP test results* Hyundai i30 (2007)
Test	Score	Rating
Adult occupant:	33	4 /5 stars
Child occupant:	34	3 /5 stars
Pedestrian:	14	2 /4 stars

=== Engines ===
Model	Engine	Power	Torque	0–100 km/h (0–62 mph) (Note: Figures displayed for manual and automatic transmission versions.)		Top speed
Petrol engines
1.4	1.4 L (1,396 cc) 16V I4	109 PS (80 kW; 108 hp) at 6200 rpm	137.2 N⋅m (101.2 lbf⋅ft) at 5000 rpm	M:	12.6 s	187 km/h (116 mph)
1.6	1.6 L (1,591 cc) 16V I4	126 PS (93 kW; 124 hp) at 6300 rpm	154.0 N⋅m (113.6 lbf⋅ft) at 4200 rpm	M:	11.1 s	192 km/h (119 mph)
1.6	1.6 L (1,591 cc) 16V I4	126 PS (93 kW; 124 hp) at 6300 rpm	154.0 N⋅m (113.6 lbf⋅ft) at 4200 rpm	A:	12.1 s	183 km/h (114 mph)
2.0	2.0 L (1,975 cc) 16V I4	143 PS (105 kW; 141 hp) at 6000 rpm	186 N⋅m (137 lbf⋅ft) at 4600 rpm	M:	10.6 s	205 km/h (127 mph)
2.0	2.0 L (1,975 cc) 16V I4	143 PS (105 kW; 141 hp) at 6000 rpm	186 N⋅m (137 lbf⋅ft) at 4600 rpm	A:	10.6 s	195 km/h (121 mph)
Diesel engines
1.6 CRDi	1.6 L (1,582 cc) 16V turbo I4	90 PS (66 kW; 89 hp) at 4000 rpm	235.0 N⋅m (173.3 lbf⋅ft) at 1750–2500 rpm	M:	14.9 s	172 km/h (107 mph)
1.6 CRDi	1.6 L (1,582 cc) 16V turbo I4	116 PS (85 kW; 114 hp) at 4000 rpm	255.0 N⋅m (188.1 lbf⋅ft) at 1900–2750 rpm	M:	11.6 s	188 km/h (117 mph)
1.6 CRDi	1.6 L (1,582 cc) 16V turbo I4	116 PS (85 kW; 114 hp) at 4000 rpm	255.0 N⋅m (188.1 lbf⋅ft) at 1900–2750 rpm	A:	12.8 s	180 km/h (112 mph)
1.6 CRDi U2	1.6 L (1,582 cc) 16V turbo I4	128 PS (94 kW; 126 hp) at 4000 rpm	260.0 N⋅m (191.8 lbf⋅ft) at 1900–2750 rpm	M:	Unknown	Unknown
1.6 CRDi U2	1.6 L (1,582 cc) 16V turbo I4	128 PS (94 kW; 126 hp) at 4000 rpm	260.0 N⋅m (191.8 lbf⋅ft) at 1900–2750 rpm	A:	Unknown	Unknown
2.0 CRDi	2.0 L (1,991 cc) 16V turbo I4	140 PS (103 kW; 138 hp) at 3800 rpm	304.0 N⋅m (224.2 lbf⋅ft) at 1900–2500 rpm	M:	10.3 s	205 km/h (127 mph)

=== Transmissions ===
Choices include a five-speed manual, six-speed manual (1.6 CRDi U2 and 2.0 CRDi), or four-speed automatic transmission. Automatic transmissions are available with 1.6 petrol, 2.0 petrol, 1.6 CRDi (116PS) models.

=== Safety ===
The i30 scored a 4.2 on the Euro NCAP crash tests for the 2008 model, and is an improvement on the 3.9 scored during the 2007 model.

The i30cw/Elantra Touring scored high on the United States National Highway Traffic Safety Administration crash tests:

- Frontal Crash:
- Side Crash:
- Roll Over:

The i30 awarded the full five star safety rating by the Australasian New Car Assessment Program.

ANCAP test results* Hyundai i30 variant(s) as tested (2007)
Test	Score
Overall	4 /5 stars
Frontal offset	11.97/16
Side impact	15.57/16
Pole	2/2
Seat belt reminders	2/3
Whiplash protection	Not Assessed
Pedestrian protection	Marginal
Electronic stability control	Optional

ANCAP test results* Hyundai i30 variants with dual frontal airbags (2008)
Test	Score
Overall	4 /5 stars
Frontal offset	12.97/16
Side impact	12.13/16
Pole	Not Assessed
Seat belt reminders	2/3
Whiplash protection	Not Assessed
Pedestrian protection	Marginal
Electronic stability control	Optional

ANCAP test results* Hyundai i30 variants fitted with ESC and side curtain airbags (2008)
Test	Score
Overall	5 /5 stars
Frontal offset	12.97/16
Side impact	12.13/16
Pole	Not Assessed
Seat belt reminders	2/3
Whiplash protection	Not Assessed
Pedestrian protection	Marginal
Electronic stability control	Optional

ANCAP test results* Hyundai i30 i30cw variants with side curtain airbags (2009)
Test	Score
Overall	5 /5 stars
Frontal offset	12.97/16
Side impact	12.13/16
Pole	Not Assessed
Seat belt reminders	2/3
Whiplash protection	Not Assessed
Pedestrian protection	Marginal
Electronic stability control	Standard

== Second generation (GD; 2011) ==
Second generation
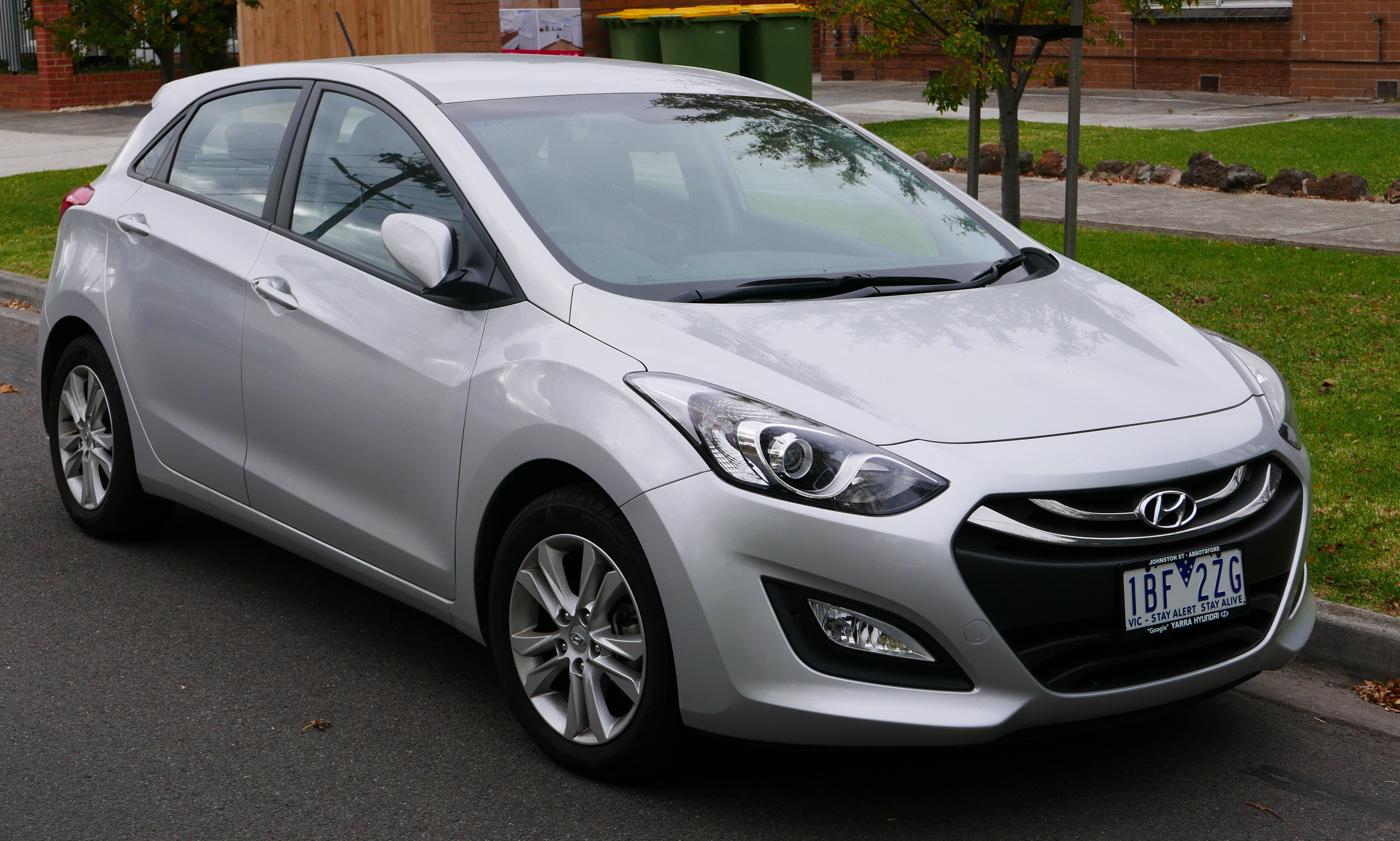

Overview
- Model code: GD
- Also called: Hyundai Elantra GT (North America)
- Production: 2011–2017; 2012–2018 (South Africa)
- Model years: 2013–2017 (North America); 2013–2018 (South Africa)
- Assembly: South Korea: Ulsan; Czech Republic: Nošovice
- Designer: Thomas Bürkle

Body and chassis
- Body style: 3-door hatchback (i30 Coupe); 5-door hatchback; 5-door estate (i30 Wagon)
- Platform: Hyundai-Kia J5 platform
- Related: Hyundai Elantra (MD/UD); Kia Cee'd (CD); Kia Forte (YD)

Powertrain
- Engine: Petrol: 1.4 L Gamma MPi D-CVVT DOHC 16v I4; 1.6 L Gamma MPi D-CVVT DOHC 16v I4; 1.6 L Gamma MPi FLEX DOHC D-CVVT 16v I4; 1.6 L Gamma GDi DOHC D-CVVT 16v I4; 1.6 L Gamma T-GDi DOHC D-CVVT 16v I4; 1.8 L Nu MPi D-CVVT DOHC 16v I4; 2.0 L Nu GDi D-CVVT DOHC 16v I4; Diesel: 1.4 L U CRDi-VGT DOHC 16v I4; 1.6 L U CRDi-VGT DOHC 16v I4
- Transmission: 6-speed manual; 6-speed Shiftronic automatic; 7-speed DCT automatic

Dimensions
- Wheelbase: 2,650 mm (104.3 in)
- Length: 4,300 mm (169.3 in) (hatchback); 4,485 mm (176.6 in) (wagon)
- Width: 1,780 mm (70.1 in)
- Height: 1,470 mm (57.9 in)
- Curb weight: 1,210–1,495 kg (2,668–3,296 lb)

Hyundai unveiled its next generation i30 at the 2011 Frankfurt International Motor Show. The new i30 was designed and engineered at the Hyundai Motor Europe Technical Centre in Rüsselsheim, Germany, and offers a choice of four engines with a total of six power options and CO_{2} emissions below 100 g/km due to an upgraded 1.6-litre diesel unit. The next generation i30 went on sale in Europe early in 2012, as a five-door hatchback. It is produced in Europe at the company's manufacturing facility in Nošovice, Czech Republic.

It was launched in South Korea since October 20, 2011, and it is the second model under Hyundai's Premium Youth Lab brand. The new Korean spec i30 is offered with a 1.6-litre Gamma GDi engine and a 1.6L VGT diesel engine.

The second generation i30 became available in the United States in the summer of 2012 for the 2013 model year, as the Hyundai Elantra GT, replacing the Elantra Touring nameplate. It made a premiere at the 2012 Chicago Auto Show, along with the new Hyundai Elantra Coupe, featuring the same 1.8-litre Nu MPI engine as the original Elantra MD sedan. In 2014, the 1.8L is replaced by the 2,0L Nu GDI engine, due to critics' opinions that the 1.8-litre wasn't sporty enough for the GT moniker. Available in a single trim level, the Elantra GT offered several different option packages which added additional features. A glass panoramic roof is available as an option.

In Malaysia, the second generation i30 was previewed during the 2013 Kuala Lumpur International Motor Show and officially launched in March 2014. For Malaysia, the i30 used a 1.8L engine and a torsion beam setup for the rear suspension.

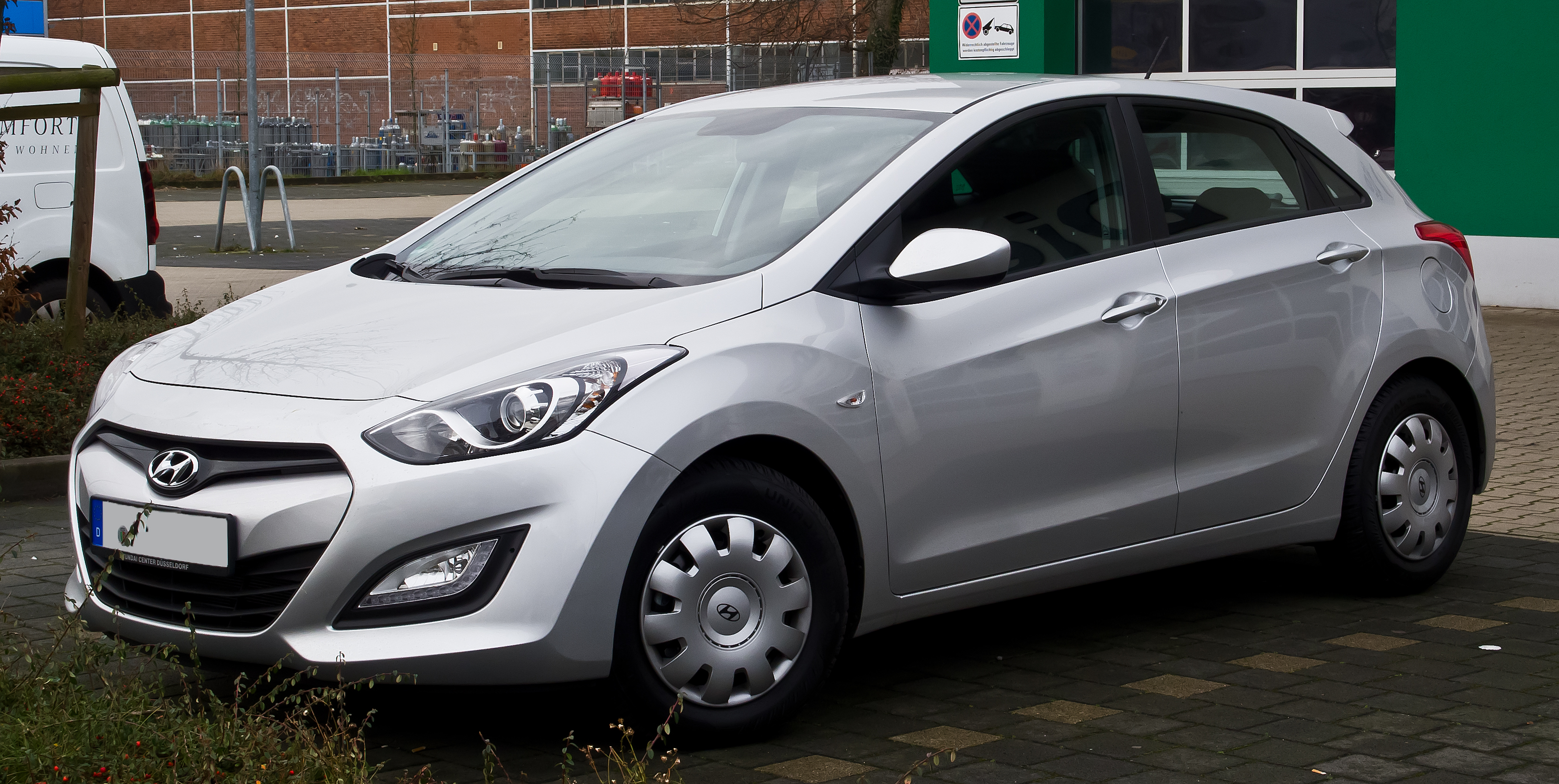
Pre-facelift (with different grille)

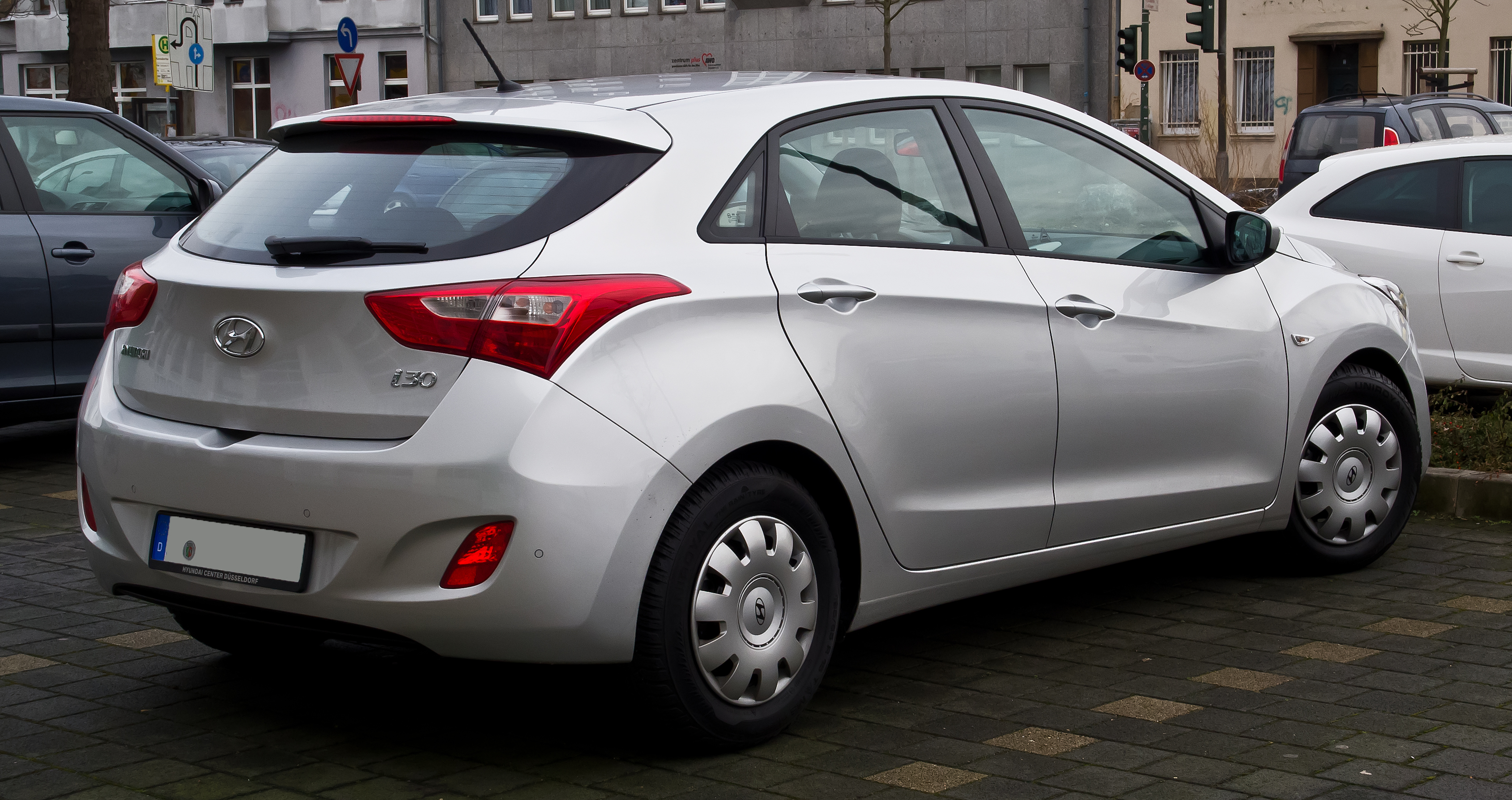
Pre-facelift (rear)

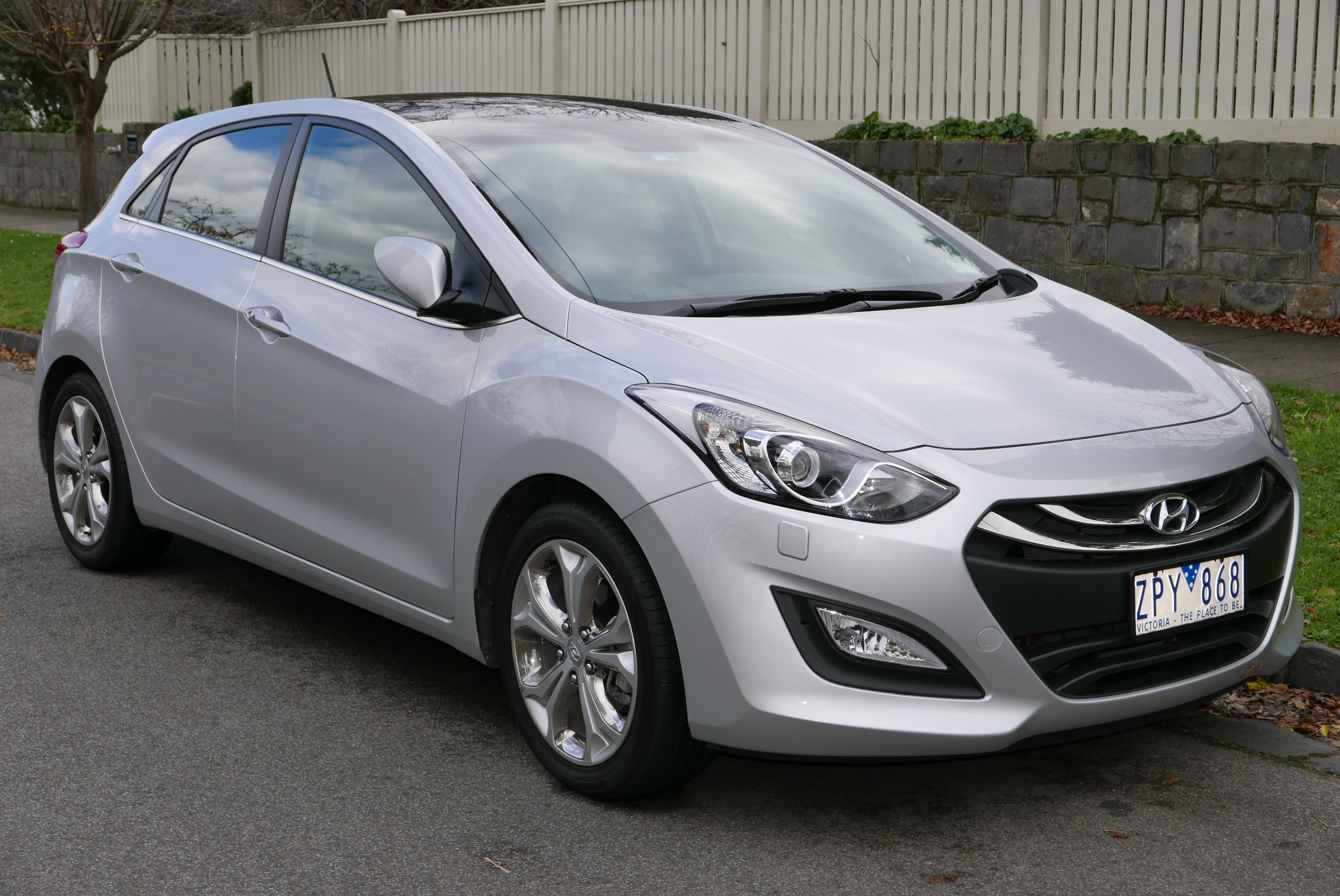
Hyundai i30 Premium five-door (front; pre-facelift)

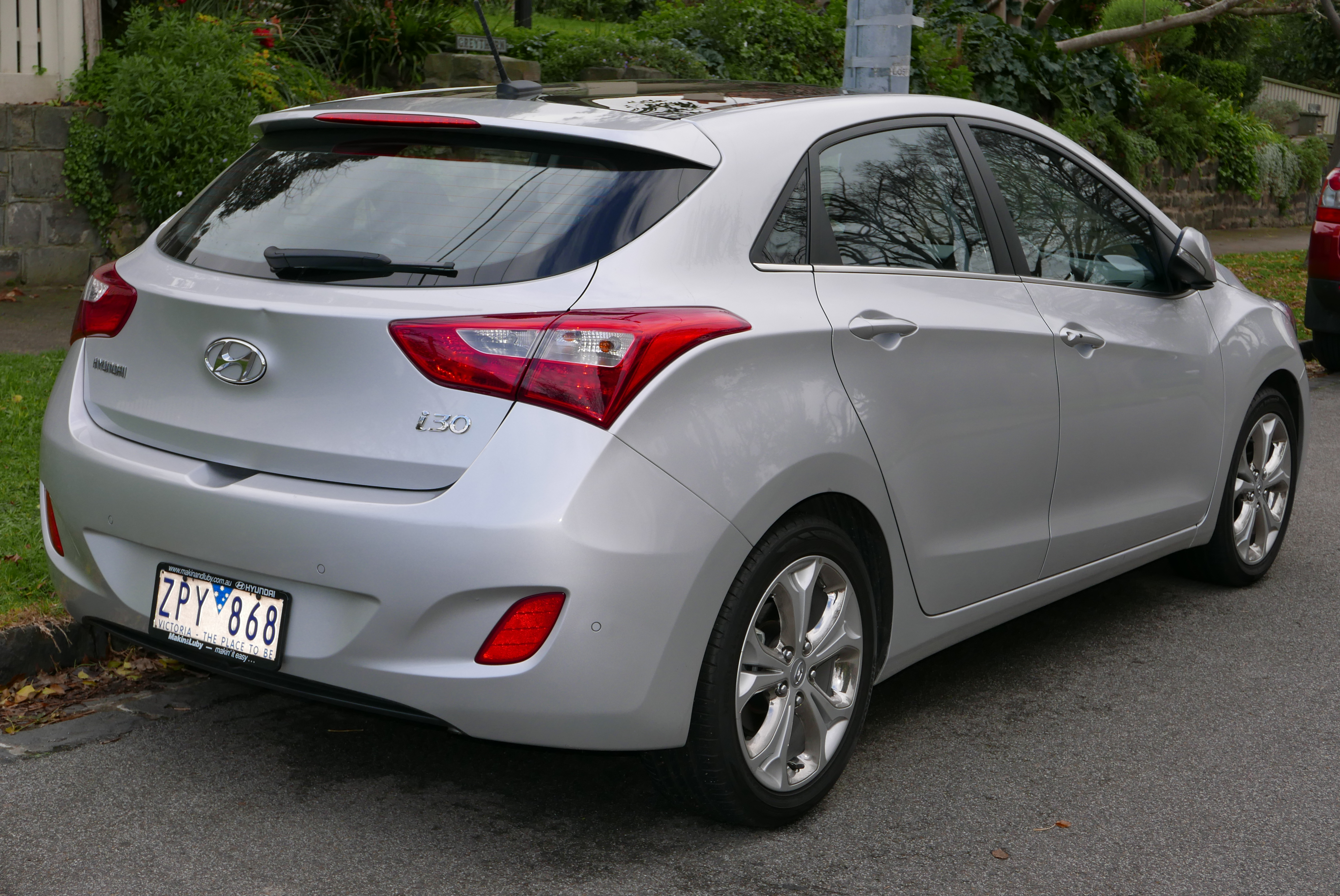
Hyundai i30 Premium five-door (rear; pre-facelift)

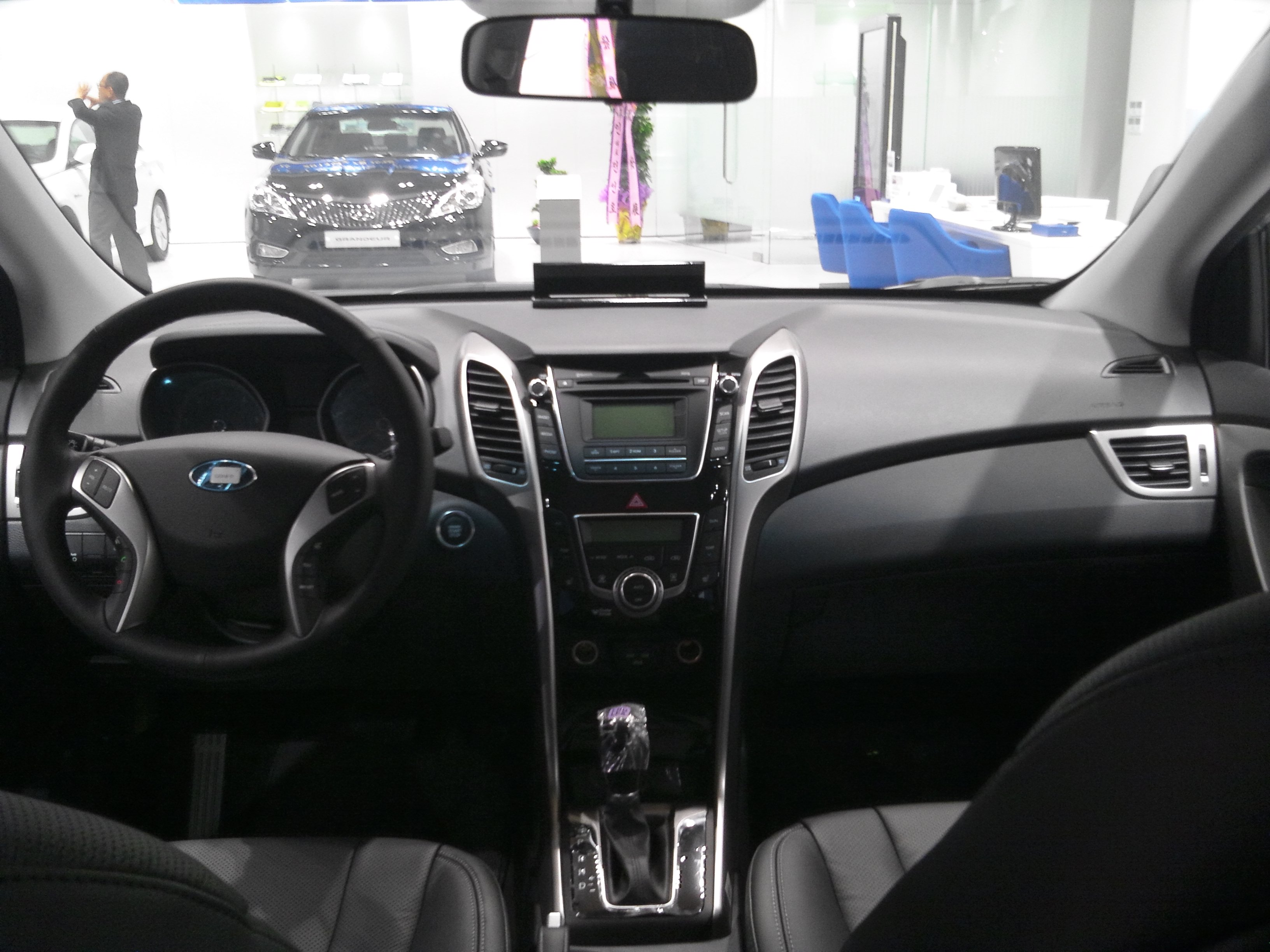
Interior

=== i30 Estate ===
An estate, or wagon, version of the second-generation i30 was premiered at the 2012 Geneva Motor Show. This model is also known as the i30 Tourer in some markets.

The wagon shares the same wheelbase as the hatchback and adds 185 mm in length. The increased length yields an extra 150 litres of boot capacity, taking the total to 528 litres. With the rear seats folded, the total cargo capacity is 1,642 litres, an increase of 326 litres over the hatch.

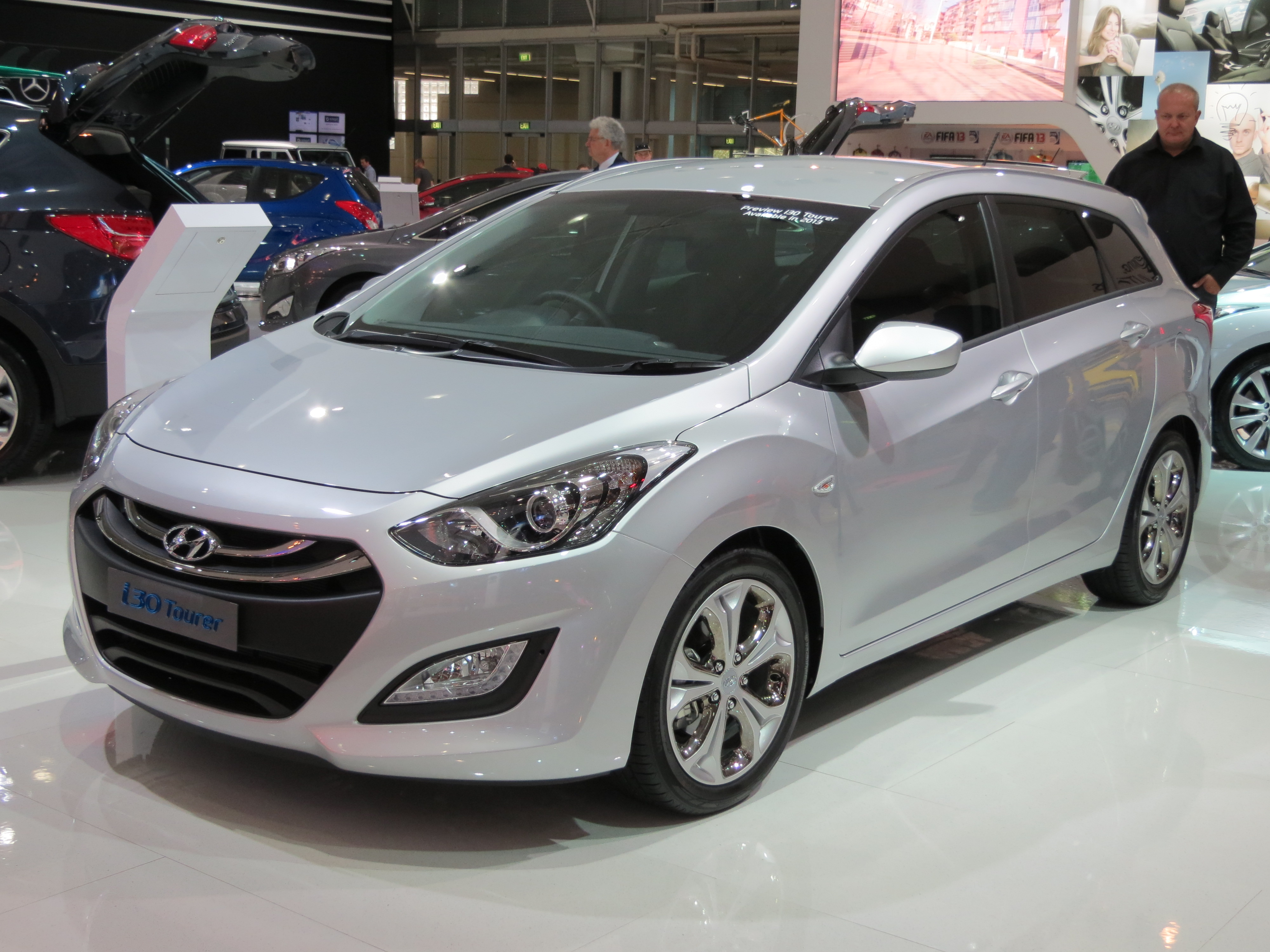
Hyundai i30 Tourer (front)

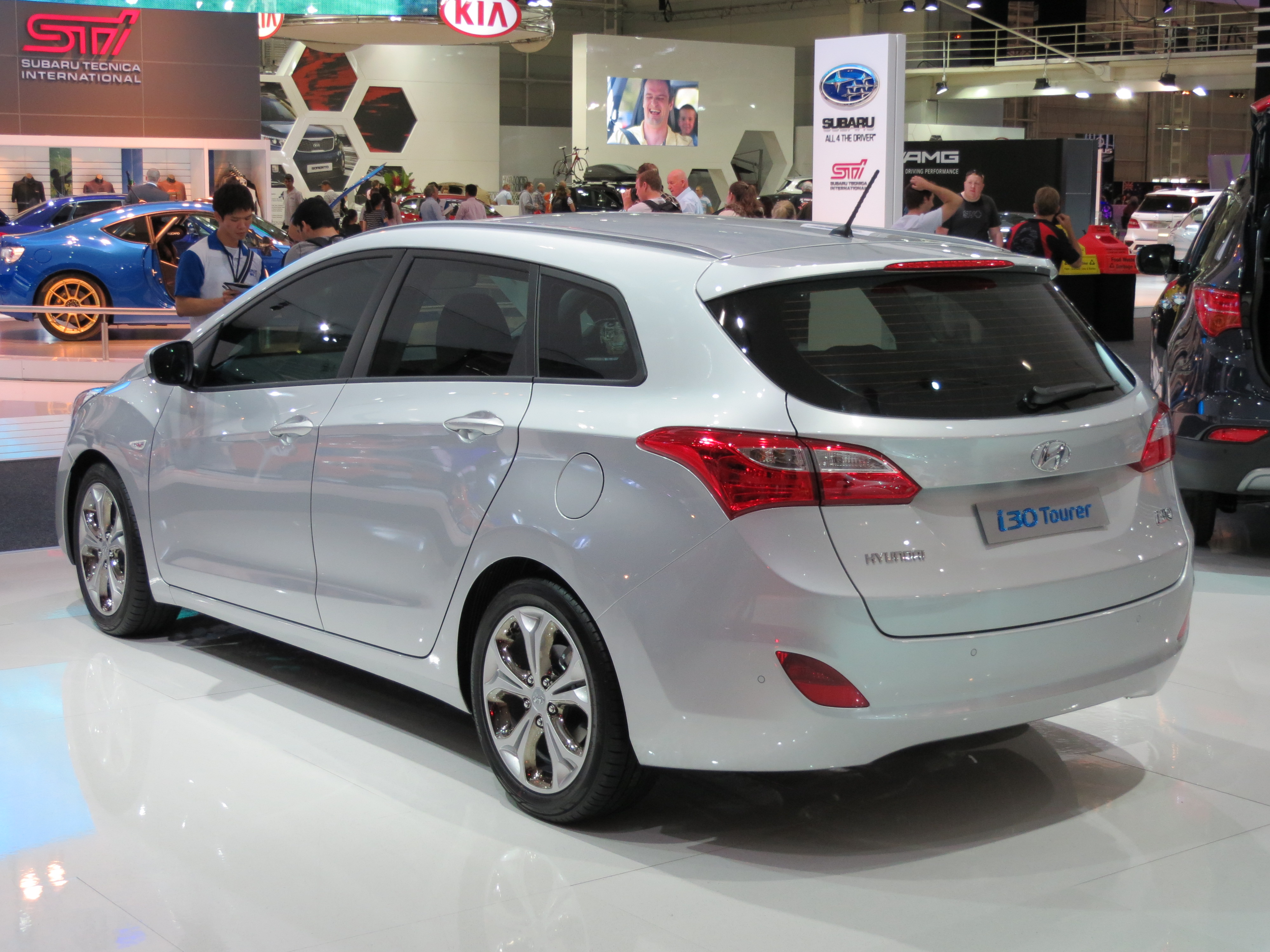
Hyundai i30 Tourer (rear)

=== i30 Coupe ===
Introduced in the beginning of 2013, the i30 Coupe features a three-door bodystyle and sportier styling features.

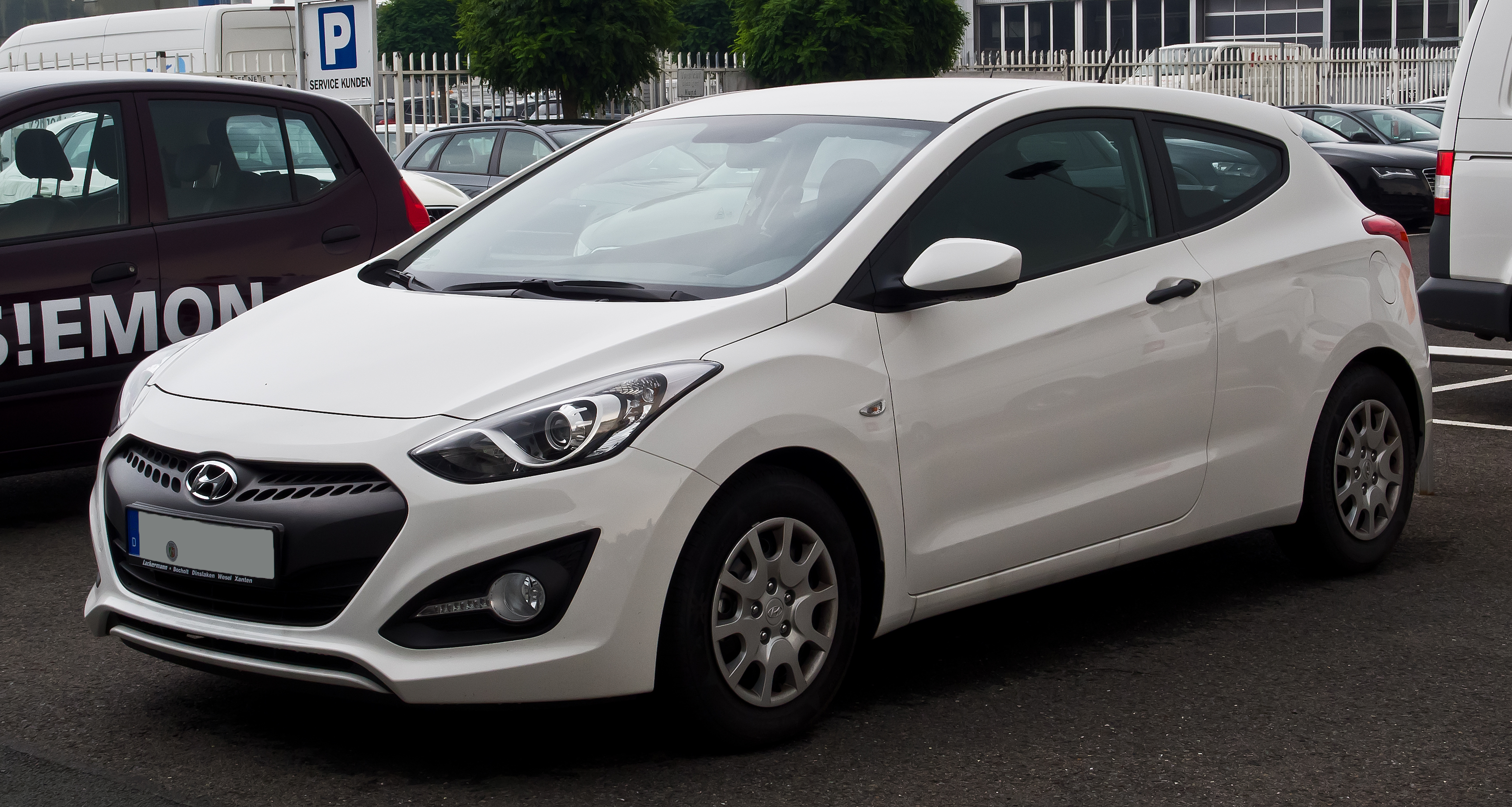
i30 Coupe (front)

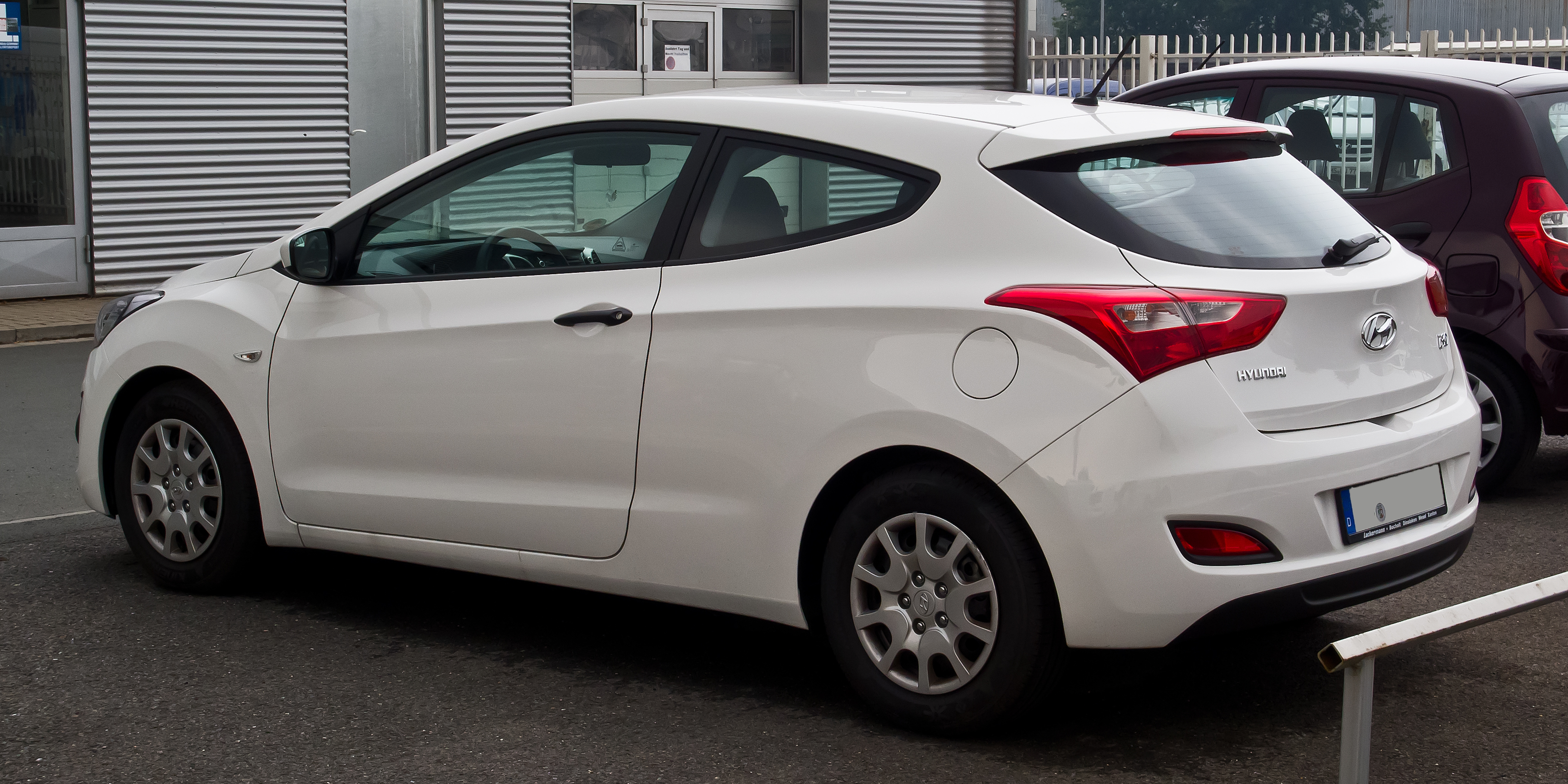
i30 Coupe (rear)

=== Facelift ===
The facelift model was unveiled on 10 December 2014 for the 2015 model year.

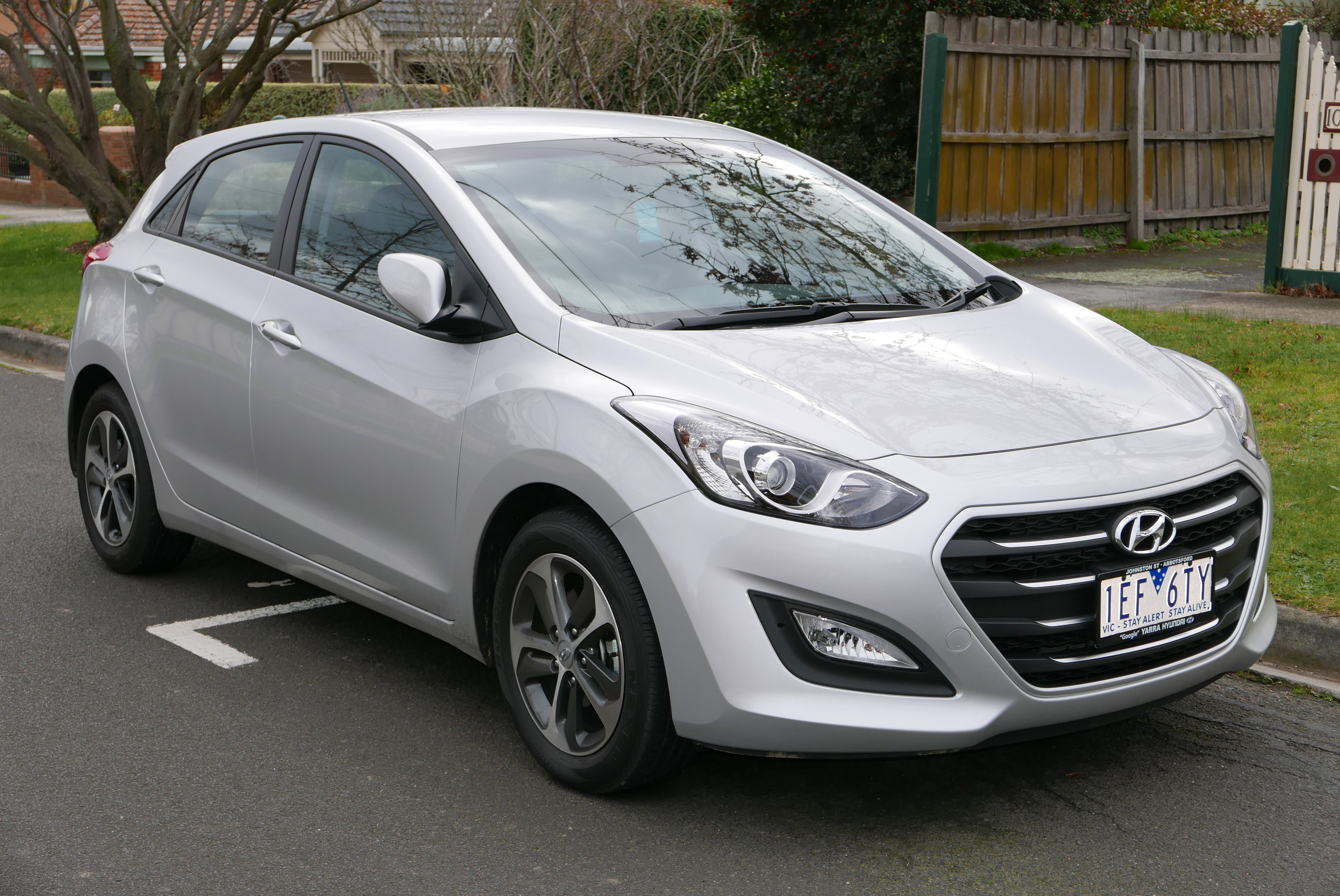
Hyundai i30 five-door (front; facelift)

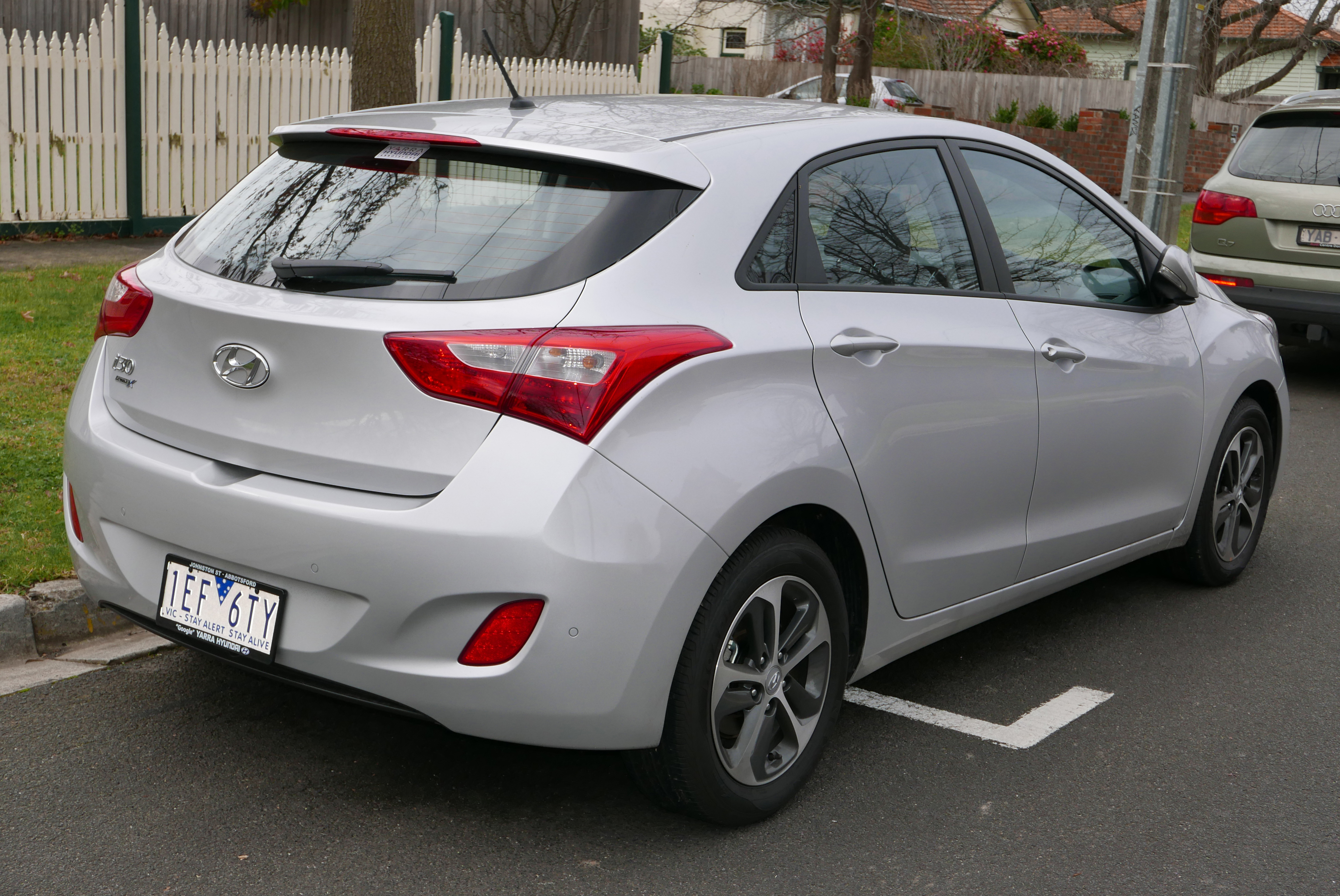
Hyundai i30 five-door (rear; facelift)

==== i30 Turbo ====
As part of the facelift of the i30 range in 2015, Hyundai introduced the i30 Turbo; a hot hatch version of the i30 with increased power over other variants with a 1.6 T-GDI engine, improved handling and more aggressive styling.

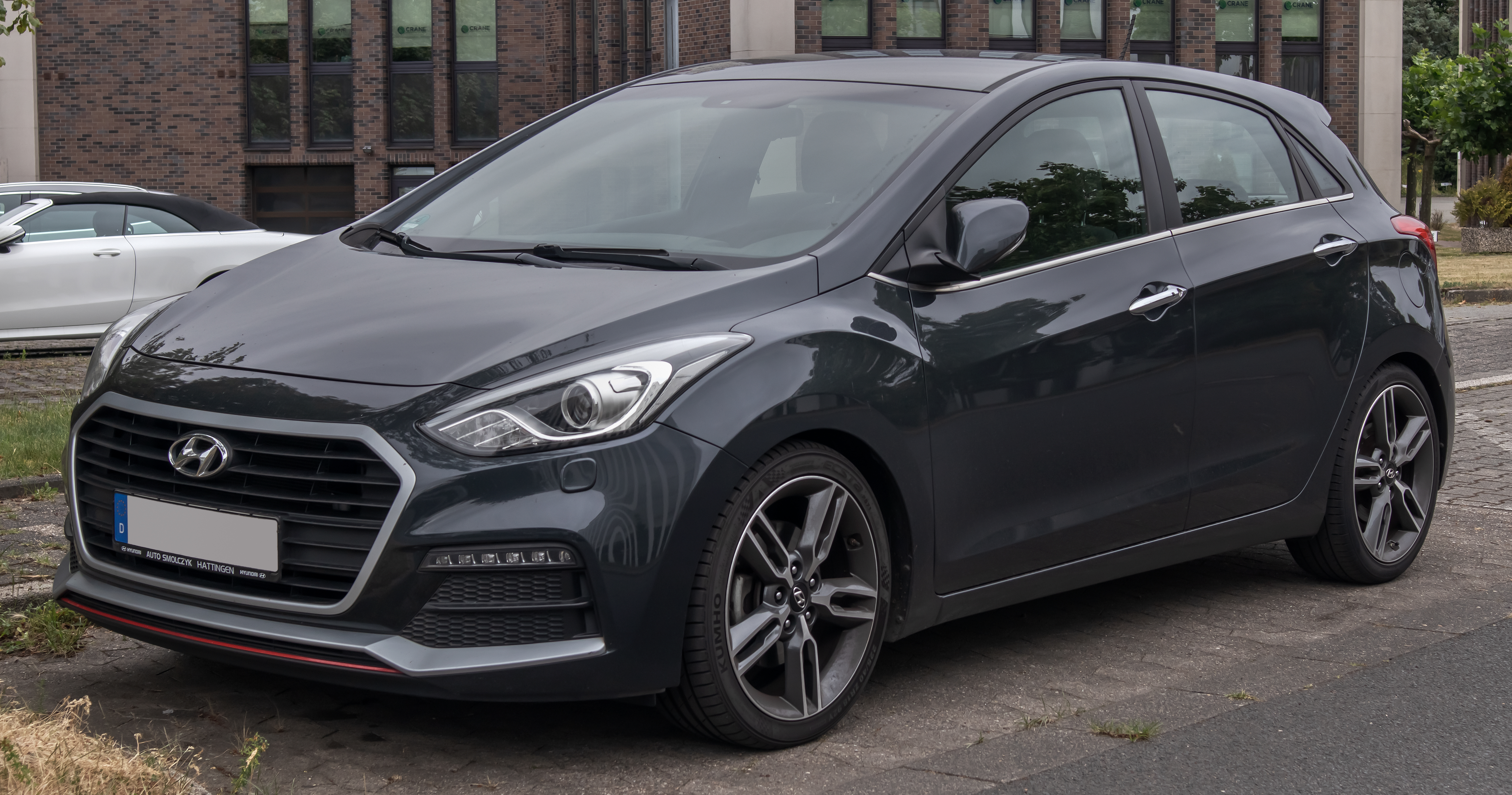
Hyundai i30 Turbo

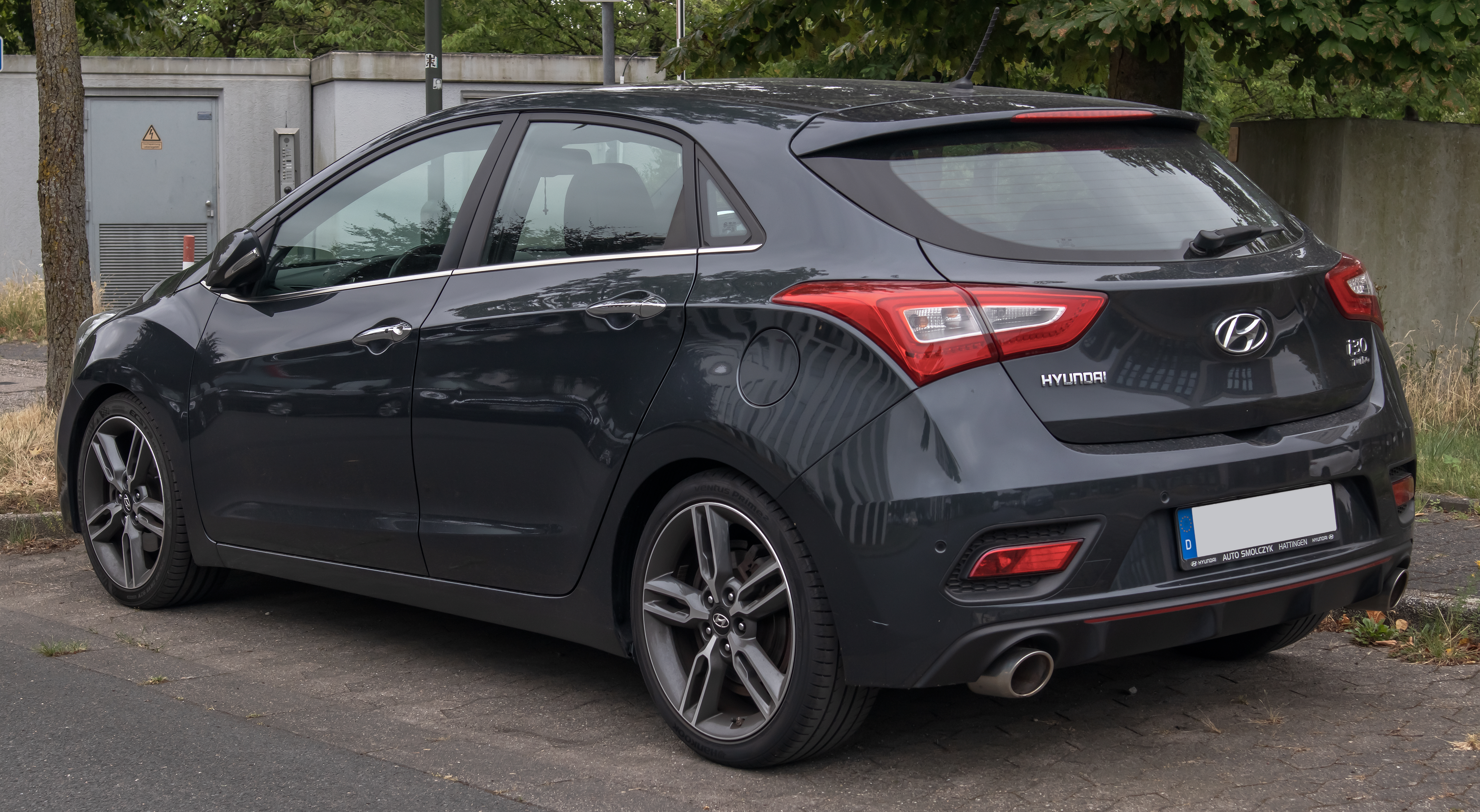
Hyundai i30 Turbo

=== Engines ===
Model	Built	Engine	Power	Torque	0–100 km/h (0–62 mph) (Note: Figures displayed for manual and automatic transmission versions.)		Top speed	Fuel cons. (per 100 km)
Petrol engines
1.4 CVVT	10/2011–9/2016	1.4 L (1,396 cc) 16V I4	99 PS (73 kW; 98 hp) at 5500 rpm	137 N⋅m (101 lbf⋅ft) at 4200 rpm	M:	13.2 s	182 km/h (113 mph)	6.0 L (NEDC)
1.6 MPI	2012-2015	1.6 L (1,591 cc) 16V I4	122 PS (88 kW; 120 hp) at 6300 rpm	156 N.m (115 lbf.ft.) at 4850 rpm	M:	10.9 s	192 km/h (119 mph)	6.4 L (NEDC)
1.6 GDI	10/2011–9/2016	1.6 L (1,591 cc) 16V I4 with direct injection	135 PS (99 kW; 133 hp) at 6300 rpm	164 N⋅m (121 lbf⋅ft) at 4850 rpm	M:	9.9 s	195 km/h (121 mph)	5.7 L (NEDC)
1.6 GDI	10/2011–9/2016	1.6 L (1,591 cc) 16V I4 with direct injection	135 PS (99 kW; 133 hp) at 6300 rpm	164 N⋅m (121 lbf⋅ft) at 4850 rpm	A:	11.0 s	192 km/h (119 mph)	6.7 L (NEDC)
1.8 CVVT	10/2011–9/2016	1.8 L (1,797 cc) 16V I4	149 PS (110 kW; 147 hp) at 6500 rpm	178 N⋅m (131 lbf⋅ft) at 4700 rpm	M:	9.7 s	Unknown	6.5 L (ADR):
1.8 CVVT	10/2011–9/2016	1.8 L (1,797 cc) 16V I4	149 PS (110 kW; 147 hp) at 6500 rpm	178 N⋅m (131 lbf⋅ft) at 4700 rpm	A:	Unknown	Unknown	6.9 L (ADR)
2.0 GDI	2013–9/2016	2.0 L (1,999 cc) 16V I4 with direct injection	175 PS (129 kW; 173 hp) at 6500 rpm	209 N⋅m (154 lbf⋅ft) at 4700 rpm	M:	7.7 s	Unknown	7.2 L (ADR)
2.0 GDI	2013–9/2016	2.0 L (1,999 cc) 16V I4 with direct injection	175 PS (129 kW; 173 hp) at 6500 rpm	209 N⋅m (154 lbf⋅ft) at 4700 rpm	A:	8.6 s	Unknown	7.5 L (ADR)
Diesel engines
1.4 CRDi	10/2011–9/2016	1.4 L (1,396 cc) 16V turbo I4 with direct injection	90 PS (66 kW; 89 hp) at 4000 rpm	220 N⋅m (162 lbf⋅ft) at 1500–2750 rpm	M:	13.5 s	170 km/h (106 mph)	4.1 L (NEDC)
1.6 CRDi	10/2011–9/2016	1.6 L (1,582 cc) 16V turbo I4 with direct injection	110 PS (81 kW; 108 hp) at 4000 rpm	280 N⋅m (207 lbf⋅ft) at 1500–3000 rpm	M:	11.5 s	185 km/h (115 mph)	4.0 L (NEDC)
1.6 CRDi	10/2011–9/2016	1.6 L (1,582 cc) 16V turbo I4 with direct injection	110 PS (81 kW; 108 hp) at 4000 rpm	280 N⋅m (207 lbf⋅ft) at 1500–3000 rpm	A	12.3 s	180 km/h (112 mph)	5.5 L (NEDC)
1.6 CRDi	10/2011–9/2016	1.6 L (1,582 cc) 16V turbo I4 with direct injection	128 PS (94 kW; 126 hp) at 4000 rpm	280 N⋅m (207 lbf⋅ft) at 1500–3000 rpm	M:	10.9 s	197 km/h (122 mph)	4.1 L (NEDC)
1.6 CRDi	10/2011–9/2016	1.6 L (1,582 cc) 16V turbo I4 with direct injection	128 PS (94 kW; 126 hp) at 4000 rpm	280 N⋅m (207 lbf⋅ft) at 1500–3000 rpm	A:	11.7 s	186 km/h (116 mph)	5.5 L (NEDC)
blue 1.6 CRDi	10/2011–9/2016	1.6 L (1,582 cc) 16V turbo I4 with direct injection	128 PS (94 kW; 126 hp) at 4000 rpm	280 N⋅m (207 lbf⋅ft) at 1500–3000 rpm	M:	10.9 s	188 km/h (117 mph)	3.7 L (NEDC)

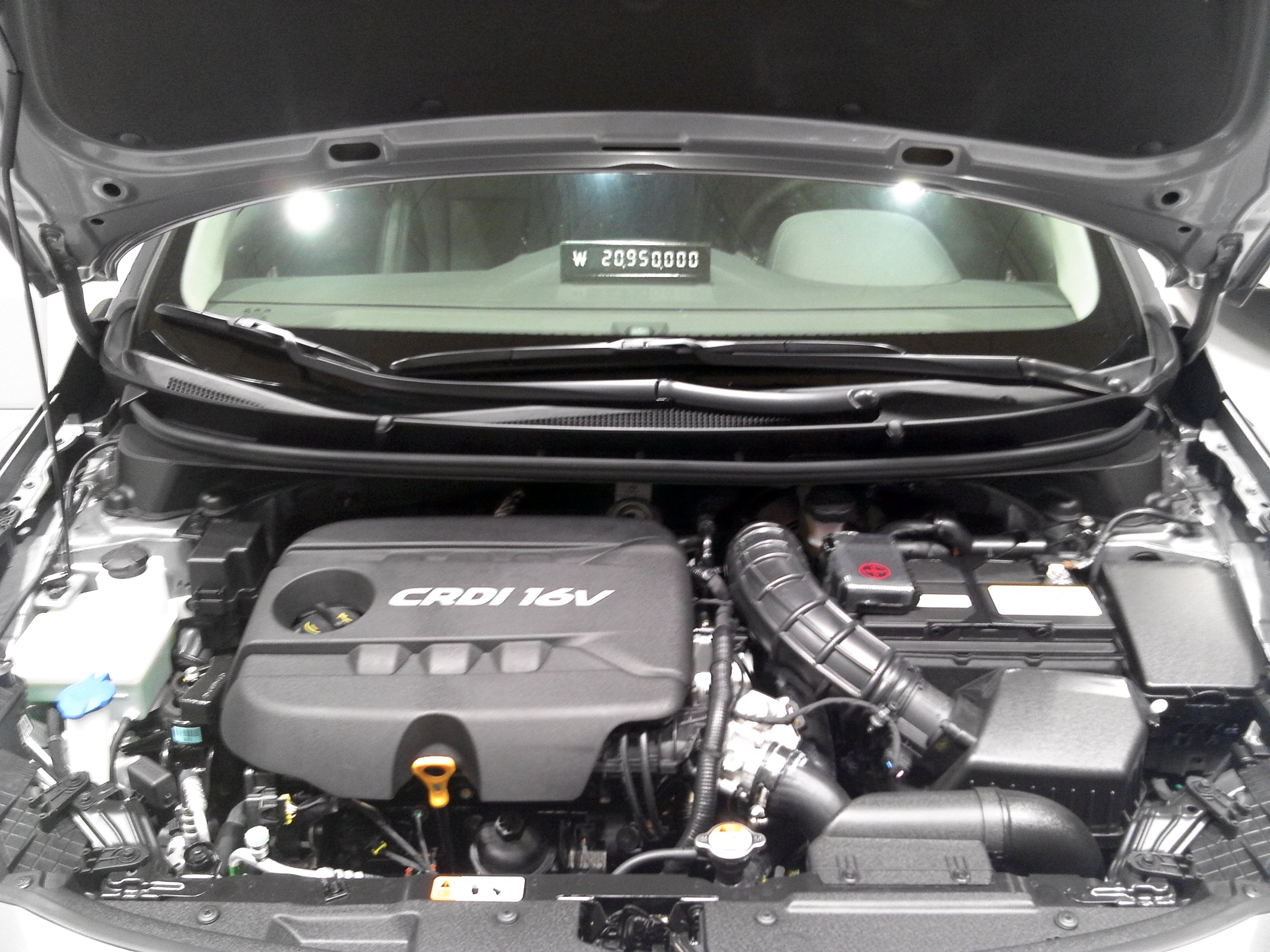
Diesel CRDi engine

=== 2015 facelift engines ===
5-door hatchback
Model	Engine	Comp.	Power	Torque	0–100 km/h (0–62 mph) (Note: Figures displayed for manual and automatic transmission versions.)		Top speed	Fuel cons. (per 100 km)
Petrol engines
1.4 MPI	1.4 L (1,368 cc) 16V I4	10.5:1	100 PS (74 kW; 99 hp) at 6000 rpm	134 N⋅m (99 lbf⋅ft) at 3500 rpm	M:	12.7 s	183 km/h (114 mph)	5.6 L (NEDC)
1.6 GDI	1.6 L (1,591 cc) 16V I4 with direct injection	11.0:1	135 PS (99 kW; 133 hp) at 6300 rpm	164 N⋅m (121 lbf⋅ft) at 4850 rpm	M:	9.9 s	195 km/h (121 mph)	5.3 L (NEDC)
1.6 GDI	1.6 L (1,591 cc) 16V I4 with direct injection	11.0:1	135 PS (99 kW; 133 hp) at 6300 rpm	164 N⋅m (121 lbf⋅ft) at 4850 rpm	A:	10.7 s	195 km/h (121 mph)	5.7 L (NEDC)
1.6 T-GDI	1.6 L (1,591 cc) 16V turbo I4 with direct injection	9.5:1	186 PS (137 kW; 183 hp) at 5500 rpm	265 N⋅m (195 lbf⋅ft) at 1500-4500 rpm	M:	8.0 s	219 km/h (136 mph)	7.3 L (NEDC)
Diesel engines
1.4 CRDi	1.4 L (1,396 cc) 16V turbo I4 with direct injection	17.0:1	90 PS (66 kW; 89 hp) at 4000 rpm	220 N⋅m (162 lbf⋅ft) at 1500-2500 rpm	M:	13.5 s	173 km/h (107 mph)	4.2 L (NEDC)
1.6 CRDi	1.6 L (1,582 cc) 16V turbo I4 and direct injection	17.3:1	136 PS (100 kW; 134 hp) at 4000 rpm	280 N⋅m (207 lbf⋅ft) at 1500–3000 rpm 300 N⋅m (221 lbf⋅ft) at 1750–2500 rpm (Note: 7-speed DCT automatic)	M:	10.2 s	197 km/h (122 mph)	3.8 L (NEDC)
1.6 CRDi	1.6 L (1,582 cc) 16V turbo I4 and direct injection	17.3:1	136 PS (100 kW; 134 hp) at 4000 rpm	280 N⋅m (207 lbf⋅ft) at 1500–3000 rpm 300 N⋅m (221 lbf⋅ft) at 1750–2500 rpm	D:	10.6 s	200 km/h (124 mph)	4.2 L (NEDC)

Estate
Model	Engine	Comp.	Power	Torque	0–100 km/h (0–62 mph)		Top speed	Fuel cons. (per 100 km)
Petrol engines
1.4 MPI	1.4 L (1,368 cc) 16V I4	10.5:1	100 PS (74 kW; 99 hp) at 6000 rpm	134 N⋅m (99 lbf⋅ft) at 3500 rpm	M:	13.0 s	181 km/h (112 mph)	5.6 L (NEDC)
1.6 GDI	1.6 L (1,591 cc) 16V I4 with direct injection	11.0:1	135 PS (99 kW; 133 hp) at 6300 rpm	164 N⋅m (121 lbf⋅ft) at 4850 rpm	M:	10.2 s	192 km/h (119 mph)	5.9 L (NEDC)
1.6 GDI	1.6 L (1,591 cc) 16V I4 with direct injection	11.0:1	135 PS (99 kW; 133 hp) at 6300 rpm	164 N⋅m (121 lbf⋅ft) at 4850 rpm	A:	11.0 s	193 km/h (120 mph)	5.7 L (NEDC)
Diesel engines
1.4 CRDi	1.4 L (1,396 cc) 16V turbo I4 with direct injection	17.0:1	90 PS (66 kW; 89 hp) at 4000 rpm	220 N⋅m (162 lbf⋅ft) at 1500-2500 rpm	M:	13.9 s	172 km/h (107 mph)	4.2 L (NEDC)
1.6 CRDi	1.6 L (1,582 cc) 16V turbo I4 and direct injection	17.3:1	136 PS (100 kW; 134 hp) at 4000 rpm	280 N⋅m (207 lbf⋅ft) at 1500–3000 rpm 300 N⋅m (221 lbf⋅ft) at 1750–2500 rpm	M:	10.5 s	194 km/h (121 mph)	3.9 L (NEDC)
1.6 CRDi	1.6 L (1,582 cc) 16V turbo I4 and direct injection	17.3:1	136 PS (100 kW; 134 hp) at 4000 rpm	280 N⋅m (207 lbf⋅ft) at 1500–3000 rpm 300 N⋅m (221 lbf⋅ft) at 1750–2500 rpm	D:	10.9 s	197 km/h (122 mph)	4.2 L (NEDC)

=== Safety ===
ANCAP test results* Hyundai i30 all variants (2012)
Test	Score
Overall	5 /5 stars
Frontal offset	15.35/16
Side impact	15.33/16
Pole	2/2
Seat belt reminders	3/3
Whiplash protection	Good
Pedestrian protection	Adequate
Electronic stability control	Standard

ANCAP test results* Hyundai i30 all variants (2014)
Test	Score
Overall	5 /5 stars
Frontal offset	15.35/16
Side impact	15.33/16
Pole	2/2
Seat belt reminders	3/3
Whiplash protection	Good
Pedestrian protection	Adequate
Electronic stability control	Standard

== Third generation (PD; 2016) ==
Third generation
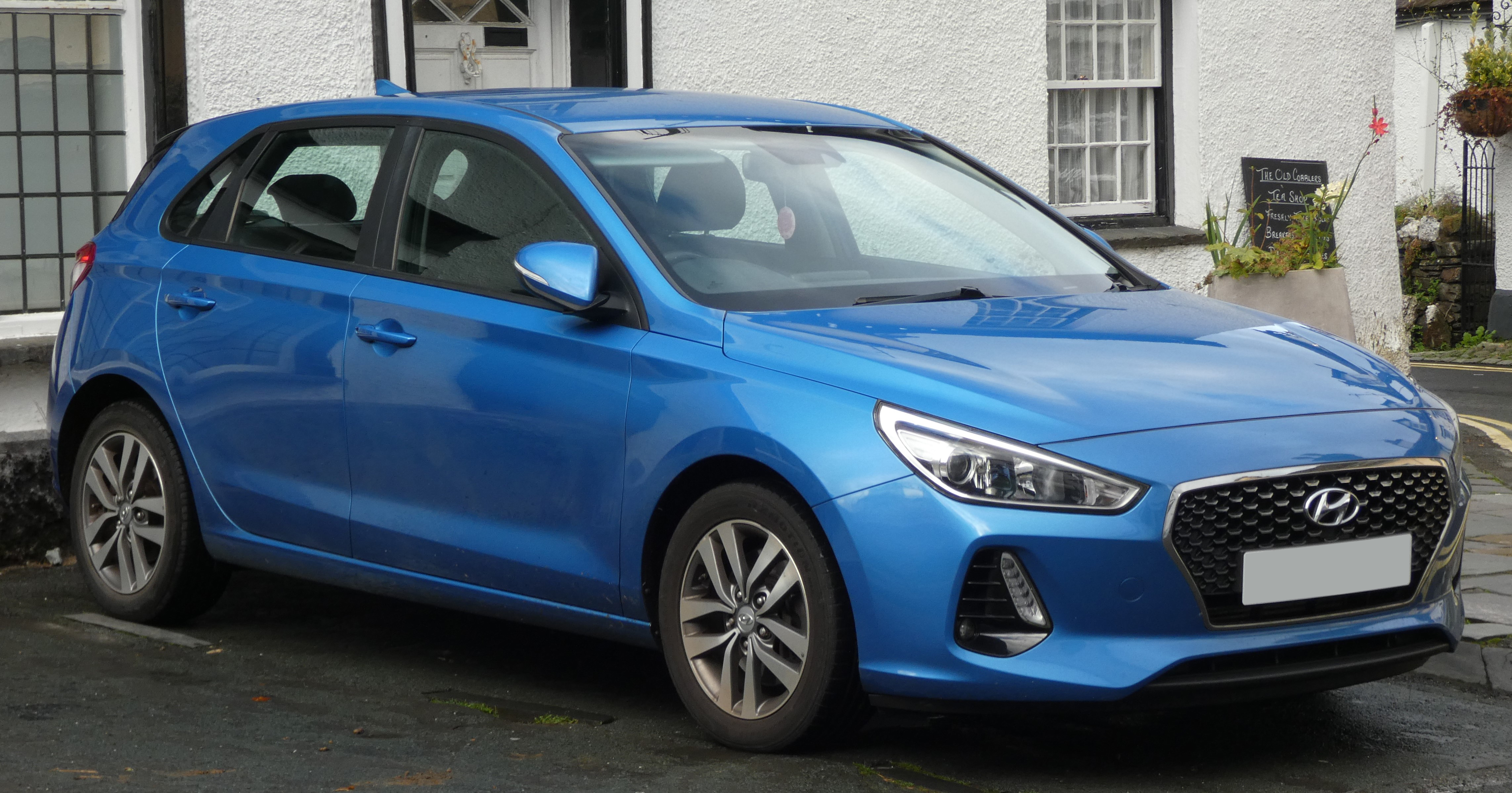

Overview
- Model code: PD
- Also called: Hyundai Elantra GT (North America)
- Production: December 2016–present
- Model years: 2018–2020 (North America)
- Assembly: South Korea: Ulsan (2016–2023); Czech Republic: Nošovice; Algeria: Tiaret
- Designer: Peter Schreyer

Body and chassis
- Body style: 5-door hatchback 5-door estate (i30 Wagon); 5-door liftback (i30 Fastback)
- Platform: Hyundai-Kia K2 platform
- Related: Hyundai Elantra (AD); Kia Ceed (CD)

Powertrain
- Engine: Petrol: 1.0 L Kappa II T-GDi I3; 1.0 L Smartstream G1.0 T-GDI I3; 1.4 L Kappa II MPi I4; 1.4 L Kappa II T-GDi I4; 1.5 L Smartstream G1.5 DPi I4; 1.6 L Gamma MPi I4; 1.6 L Gamma T-GDi I4; 2.0 L Nu GDi I4; 2.0 L Theta II T-GDi I4; Petrol Mild hybrid: 1.0 L Smartstream G1.0 T-GDI I3; 1.5 L Smartstream G1.5 T-GDI I4; Diesel: 1.6 L U II CRDi I4; 1.6 L Smartstream D1.6 CRDi I4
- Electric motor: 48v Starter Generator (MHSG)
- Transmission: 6-Speed manual 6-Speed automatic 7/8-Speed DCT
- Hybrid drivetrain: Mild hybrid (i30 MHEV)

Dimensions
- Wheelbase: 2,650 mm (104.3 in)
- Length: 4,340 mm (170.9 in) (hatchback); 4,585 mm (180.5 in) (wagon); 4,455 mm (175.4 in) (liftback)
- Width: 1,795 mm (70.7 in)
- Height: 1,450–1,455 mm (57.1–57.3 in) (hatchback); 1,475 mm (58.1 in) (wagon); 1,425 mm (56.1 in) (liftback)
- Curb weight: 1,197–1,520 kg (2,639–3,351 lb)

Hyundai unveiled the third generation i30 at the 2016 Paris Motor Show. The car introduced a new design language for the brand called "Cascading grille". It is launched for North American market in 2017 as 2018 model as Elantra GT. For the 2019 model year, for European markets only, Hyundai standardized the i30 Fastback front design, for all i30 versions. (Excluding the i30 N-line and i30N models)

The Hyundai i30 Fastback replaced Elantra in EU markets where it was being sold until Autumn 2017, where it was being presented at the Frankfurt Motor Show.

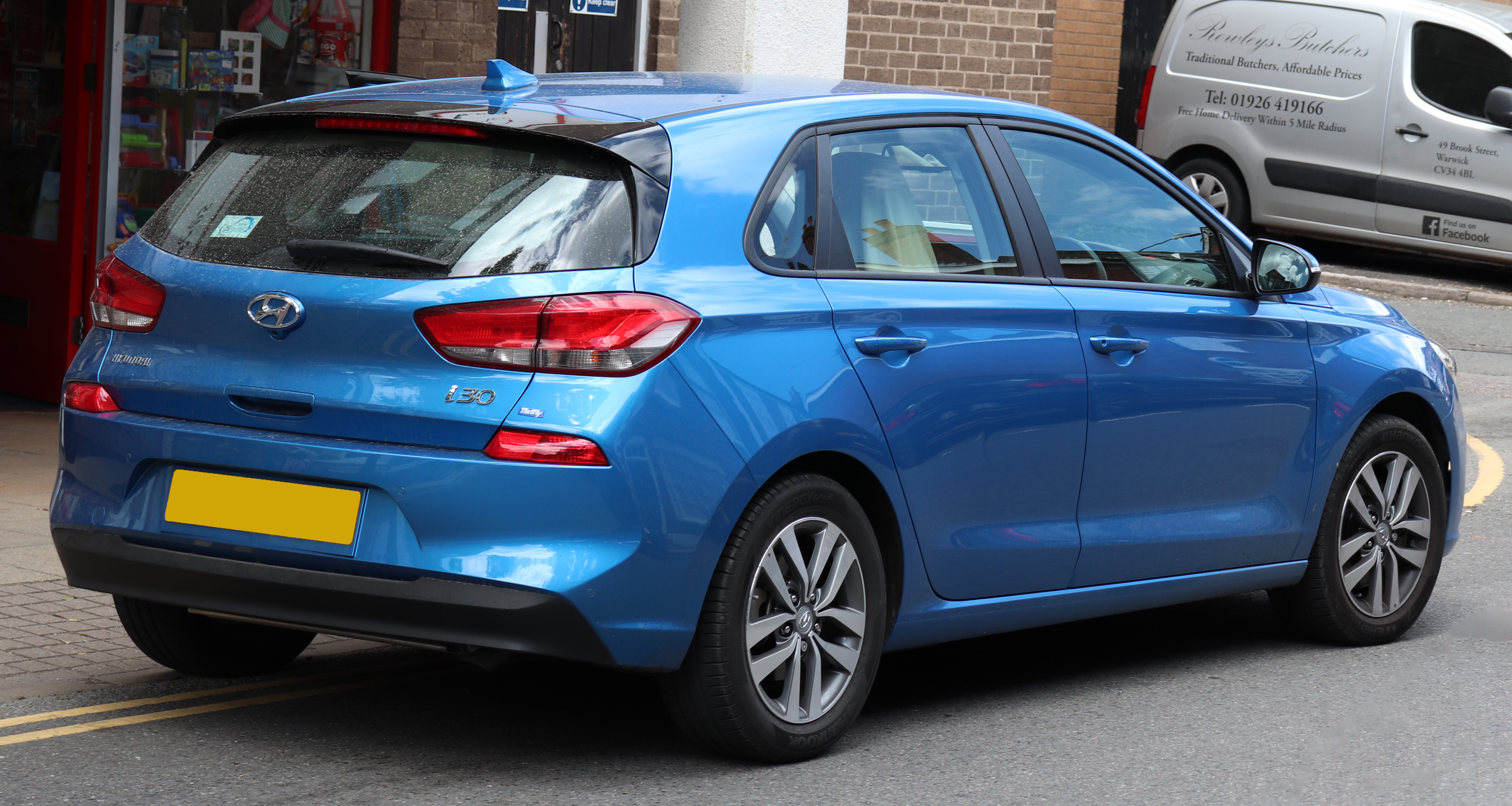
Rear view

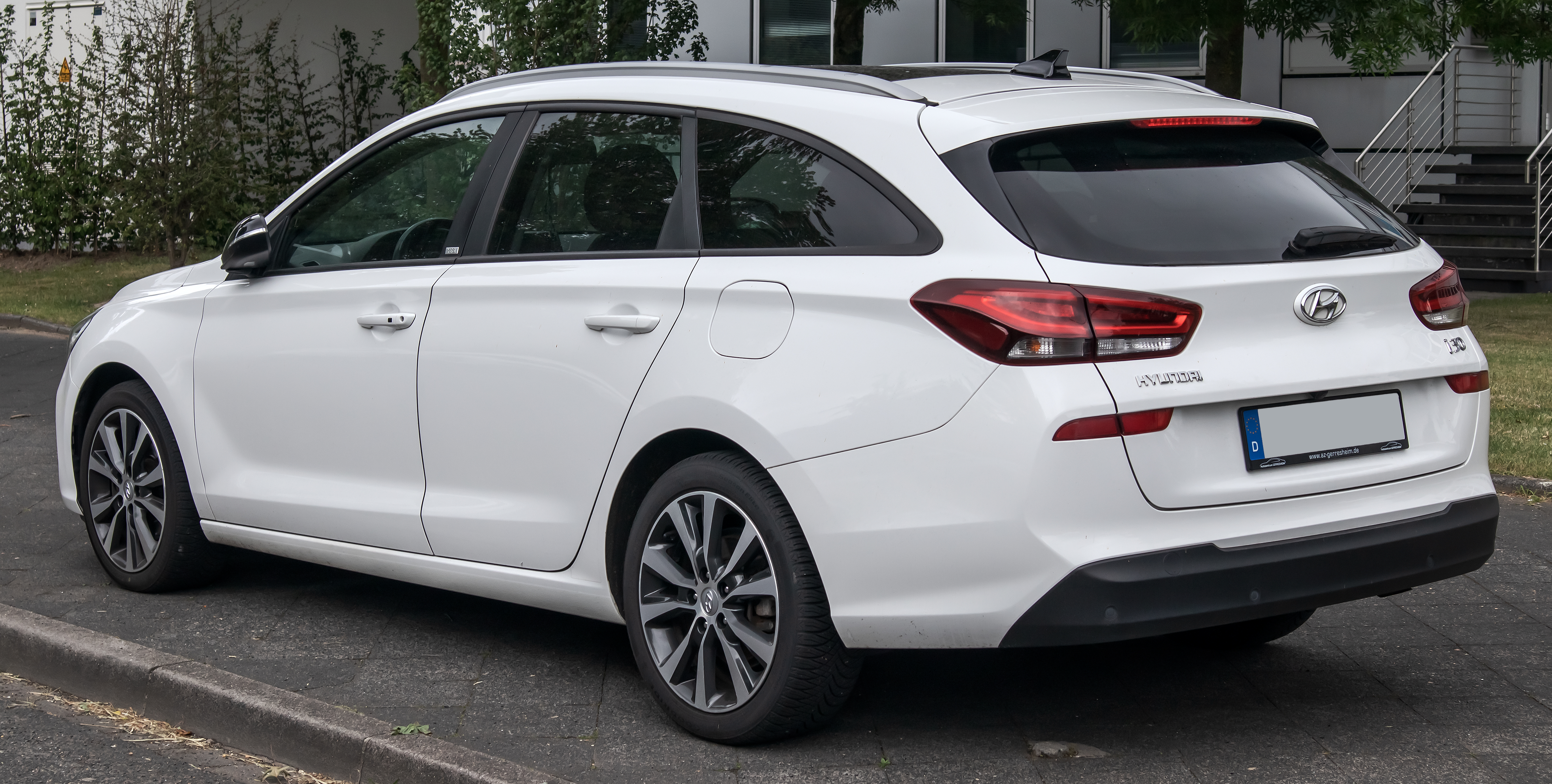
Touring

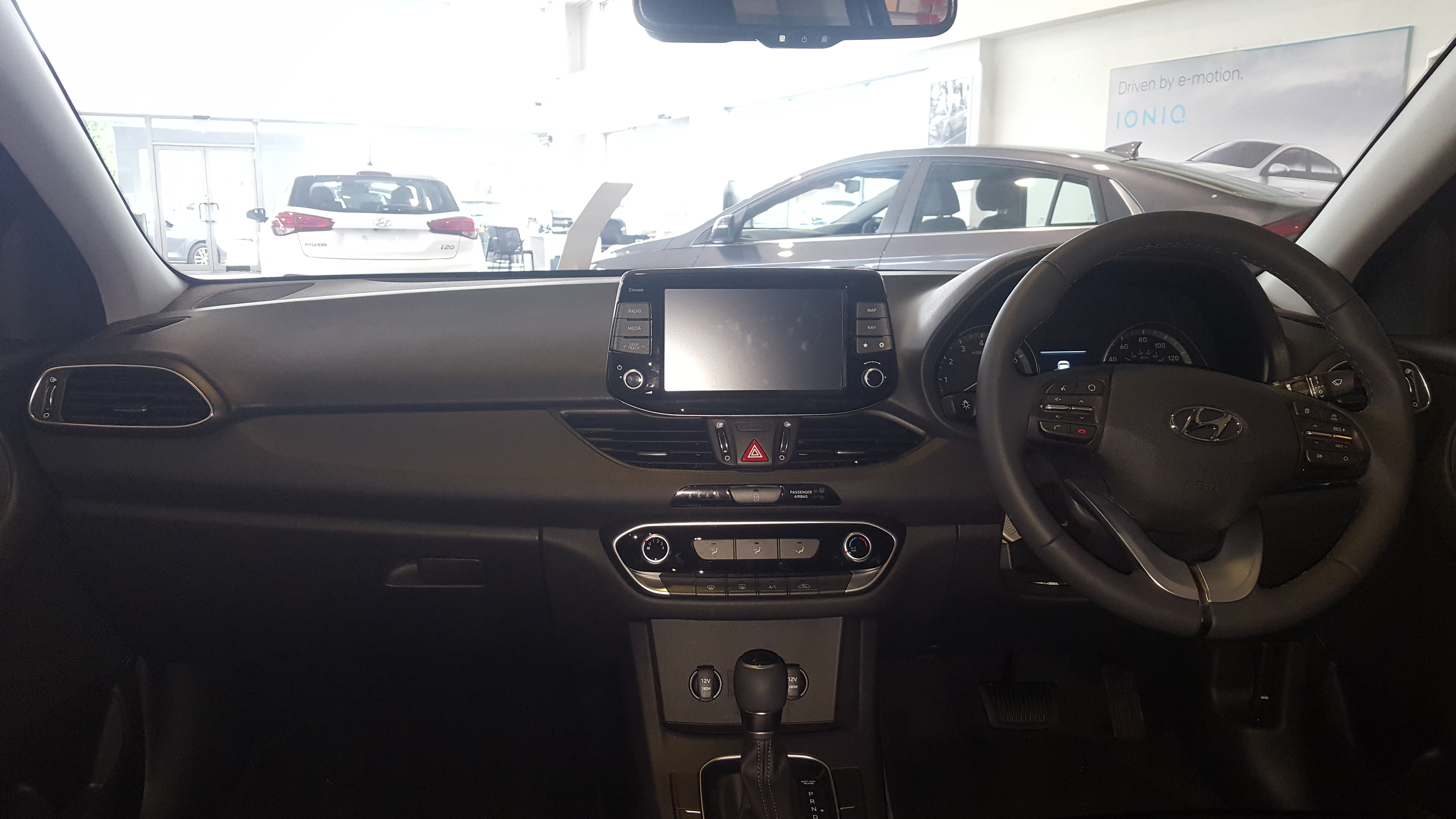
Interior

=== Fastback ===
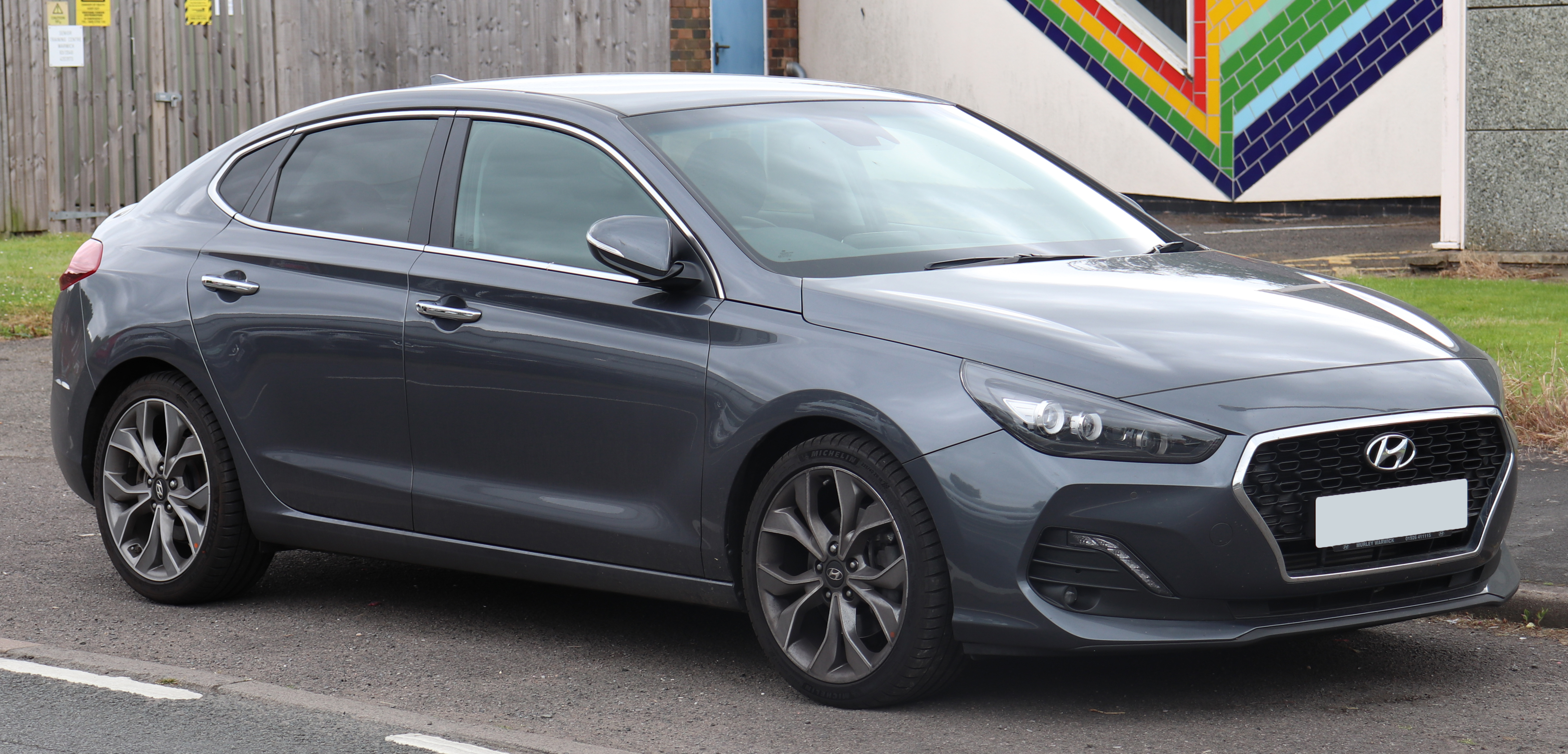
Liftback (marketed as a "fastback")

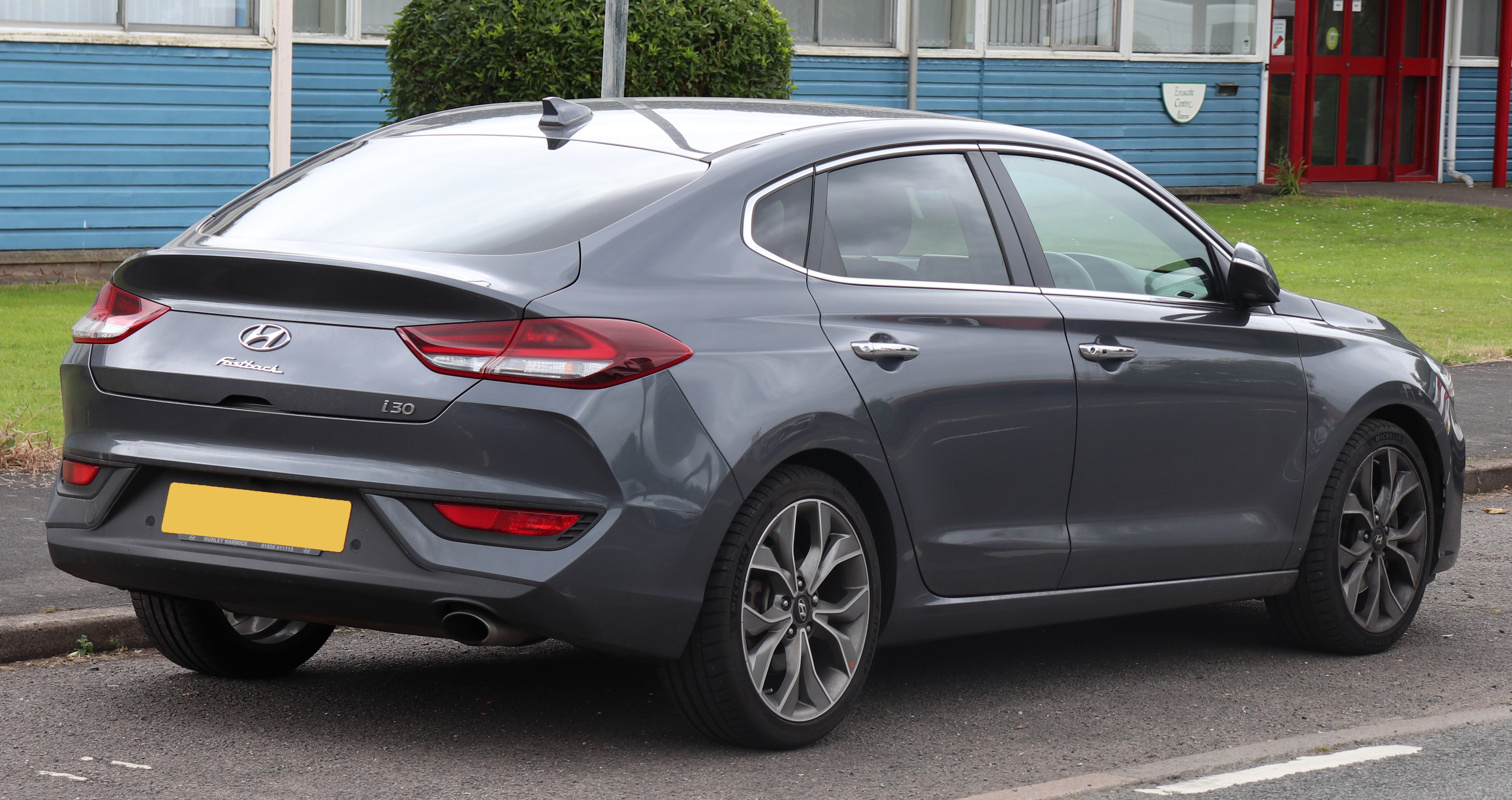
Liftback (marketed as a "fastback")

=== N-Line ===
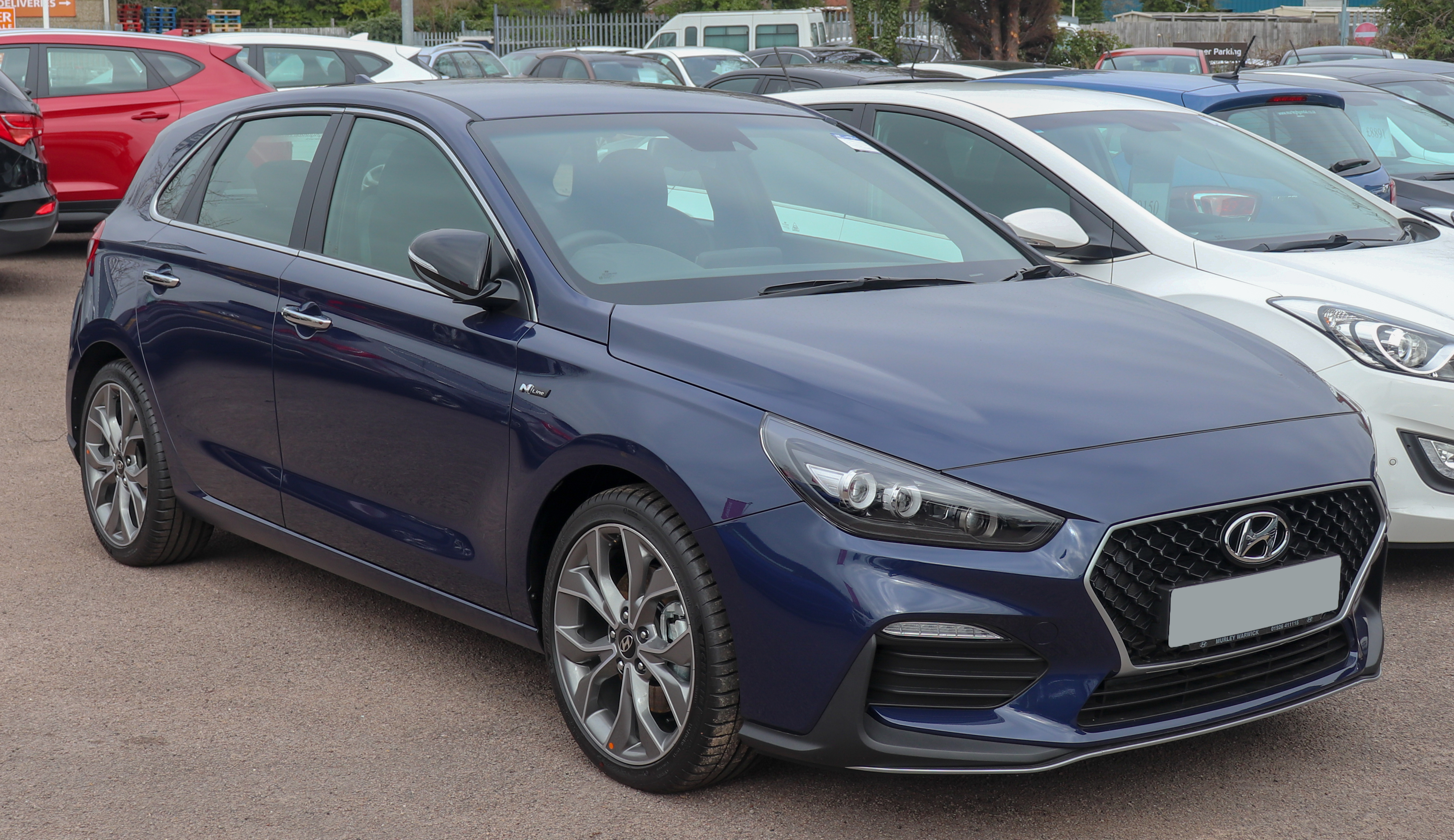
N-Line

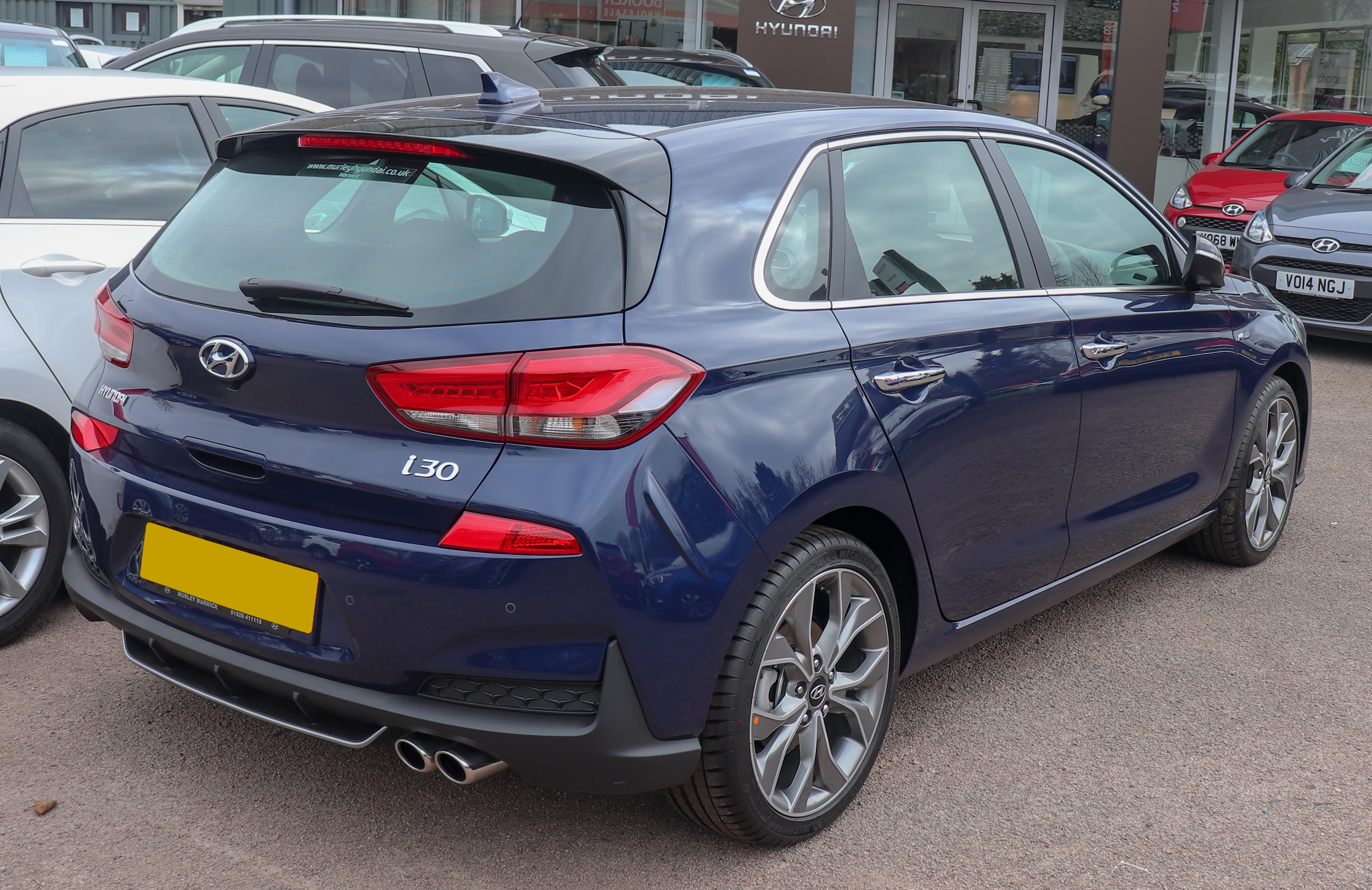
N-Line

=== Elantra GT ===
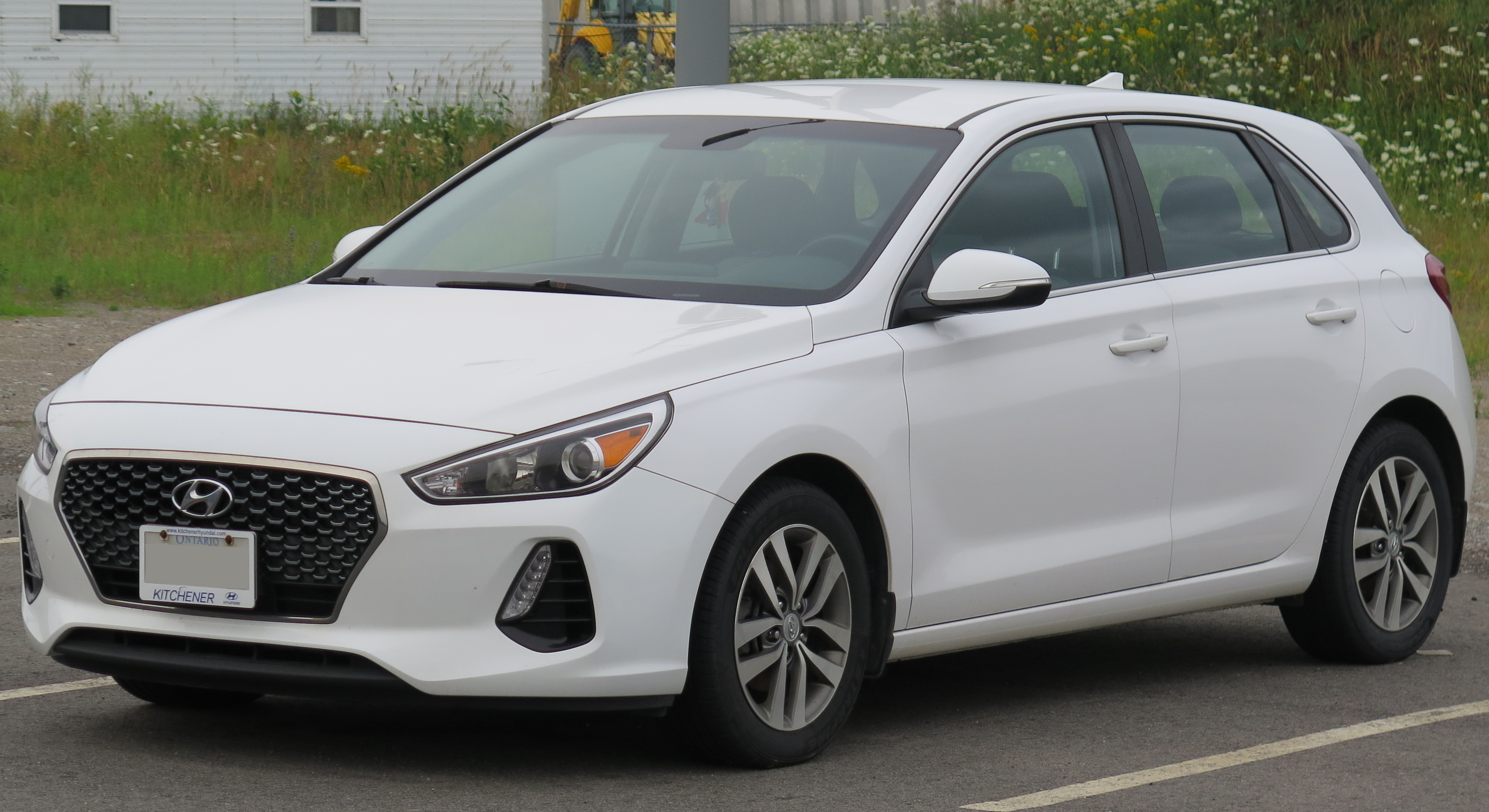

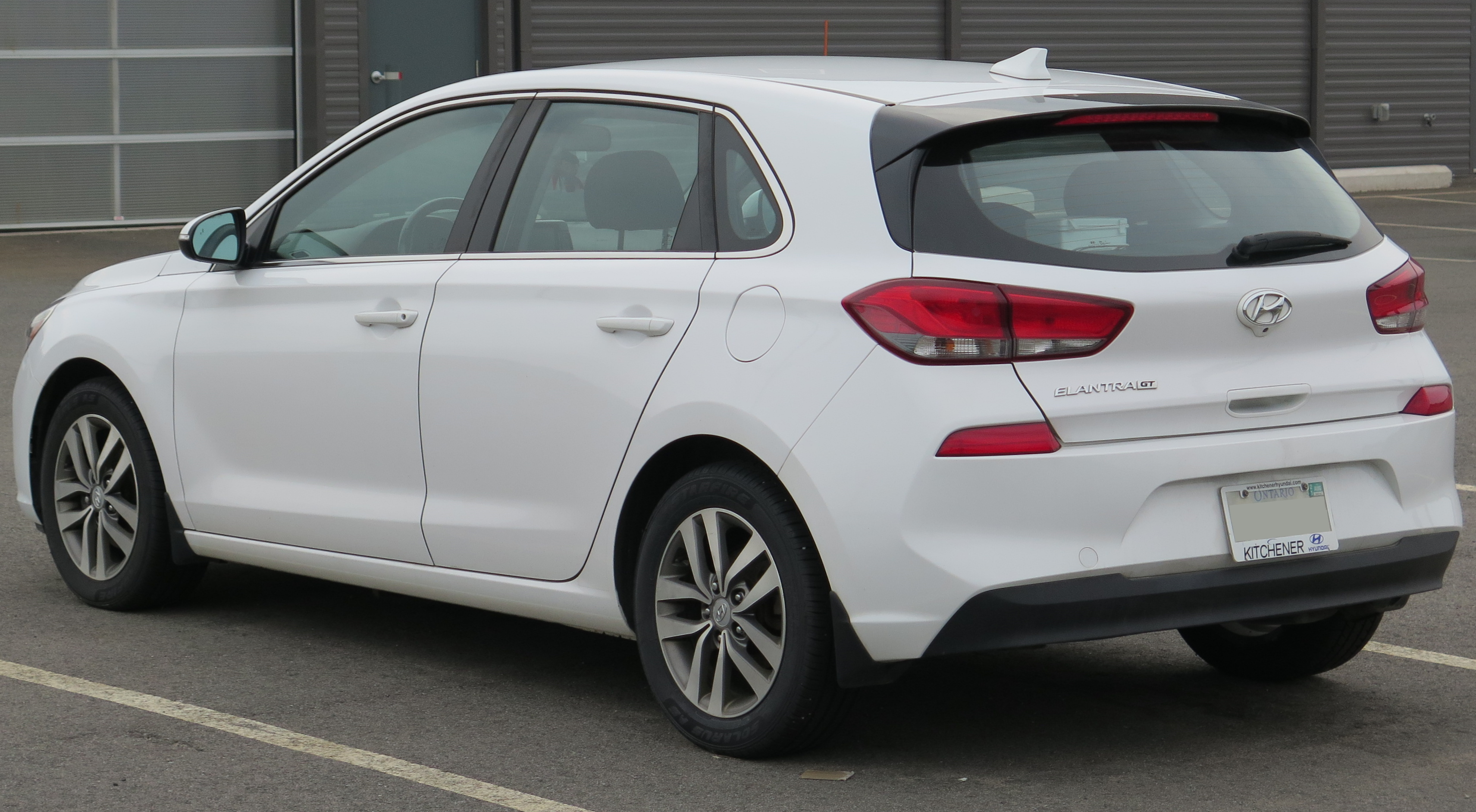
2018 Elantra GT (Canada)

In some markets, the third-generation Hyundai i30 Hatchback is sold as the Hyundai Elantra GT. In the U.S., the Elantra GT is available in two distinct models: Elantra GT and Elantra GT Sport.

The base Elantra GT is powered by a naturally-aspirated 2.0L inline four-cylinder (I4) engine that produces 161 hp (120 kW) at 6,200 rpm, and 150 lb⋅ft (203 N⋅m) of torque at 4,700 rpm. This engine is shared with the standard Hyundai Elantra Sedan. The performance-oriented Elantra GT Sport, in addition to replacing the standard rear torsion-beam suspension with an independent suspension, is powered by a turbocharged 1.6L I4 engine that produces 201 hp (150 kW) at 6,000 rpm, and 195 lb⋅ft (264 N⋅m) of torque at 1,500-4,500 rpm. This engine is the same engine as equipped in the Kia Forte Hatchback SX Turbo and the Kia Soul Exclaim (!) Turbo. Transmission choices for the Elantra GT are a standard six-speed manual transmission, or an optional six-speed automatic transmission. Transmission choices for the Elantra GT Sport include a standard six-speed manual transmission, or an optional seven-speed Dual Clutch automatic (DCT) transmission. "Drive Mode Select" is standard on cars equipped with either the automatic transmission, or the Dual Clutch (DCT) automatic transmission.

According to the Car and Driver, the GT Sport fell "short of delivering the buttoned-down refinement found in the class leaders when attacking twisting tarmac" and its body leans more than they would like in turns, "the electrically assisted steering lacks the precision and feel of the Honda Civic Sport hatchback and the GTI".

For 2019, the Elantra GT Sport was replaced with the Elantra GT N-Line. The N-Line trim improves upon the Sport model with additional body welds, substantially stiffer springs, firmer engine and transmission mounts, a larger rear anti-roll bar, and revised damper tuning to reduce body lean and improve handling. The Elantra GT N-Line is similar to that of the i30 N-Line.

The Elantra GT was discontinued in the US and Canada after the 2020 model year. Hyundai directed buyers to its Venue and Kona crossovers instead, as well as the updated Elantra sedan and Veloster.

=== i30 N ===
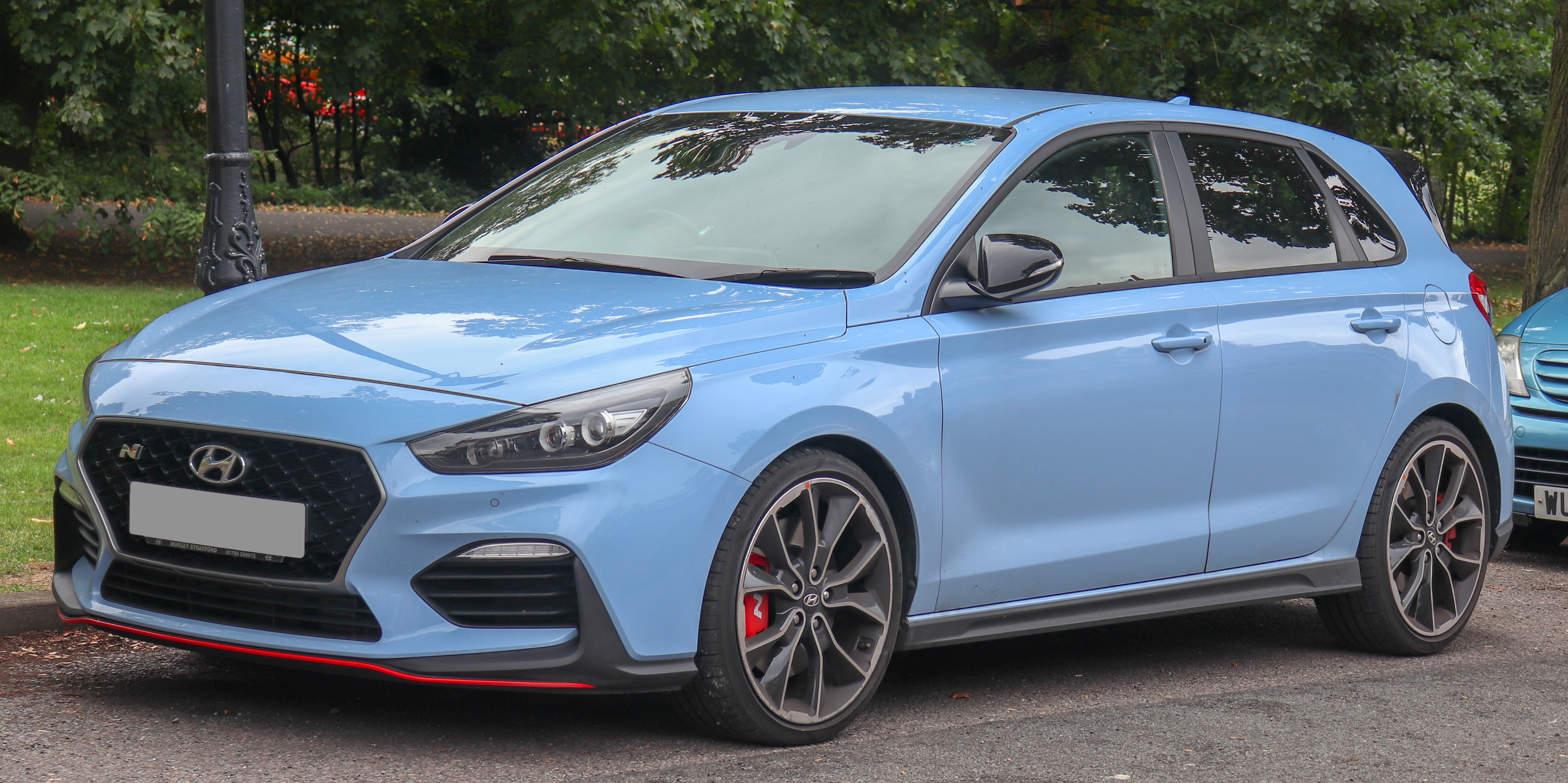
i30 N (pre-facelift)

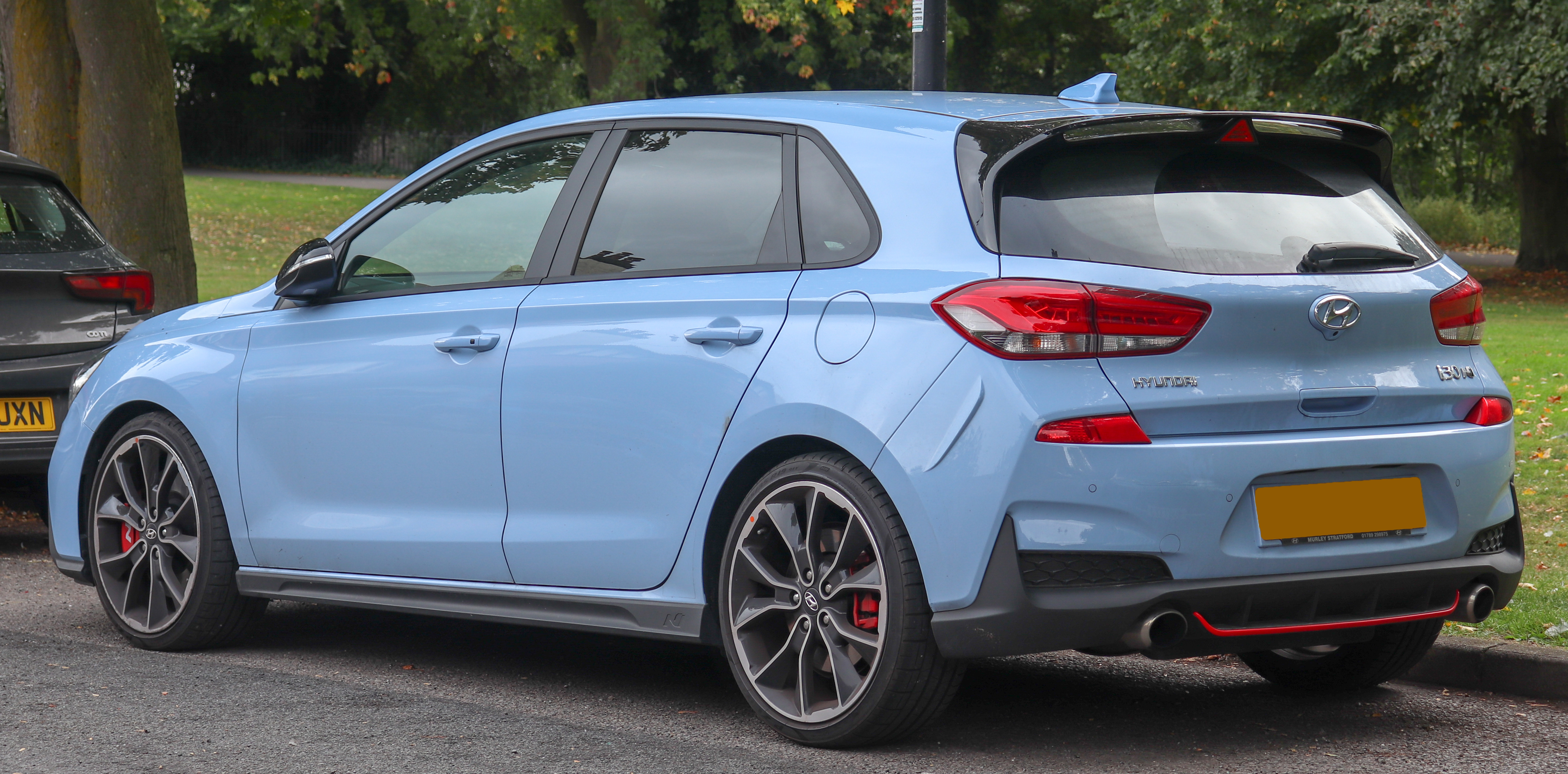
i30 N (pre-facelift)

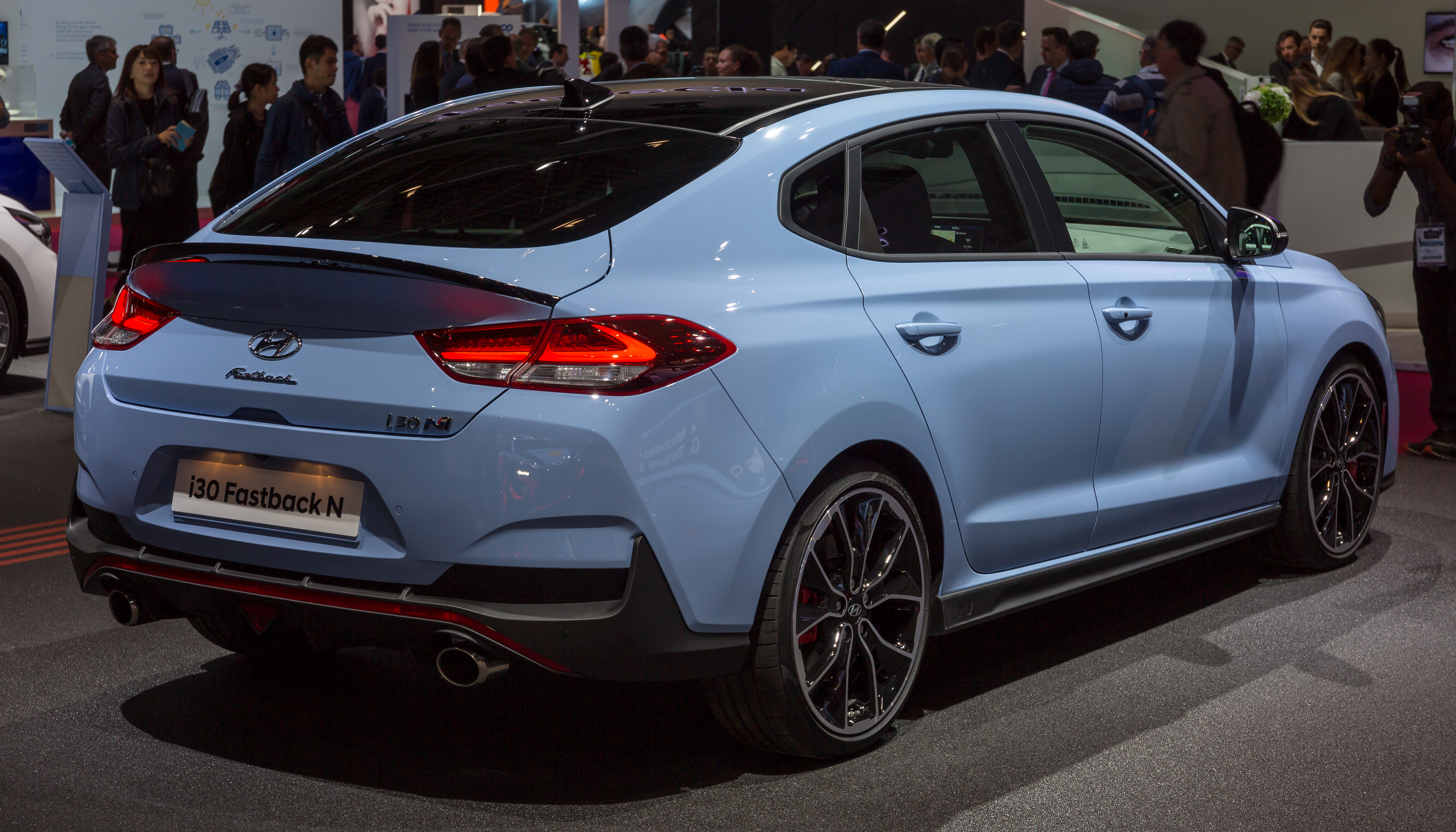
i30 Fastback N (pre-facelift)

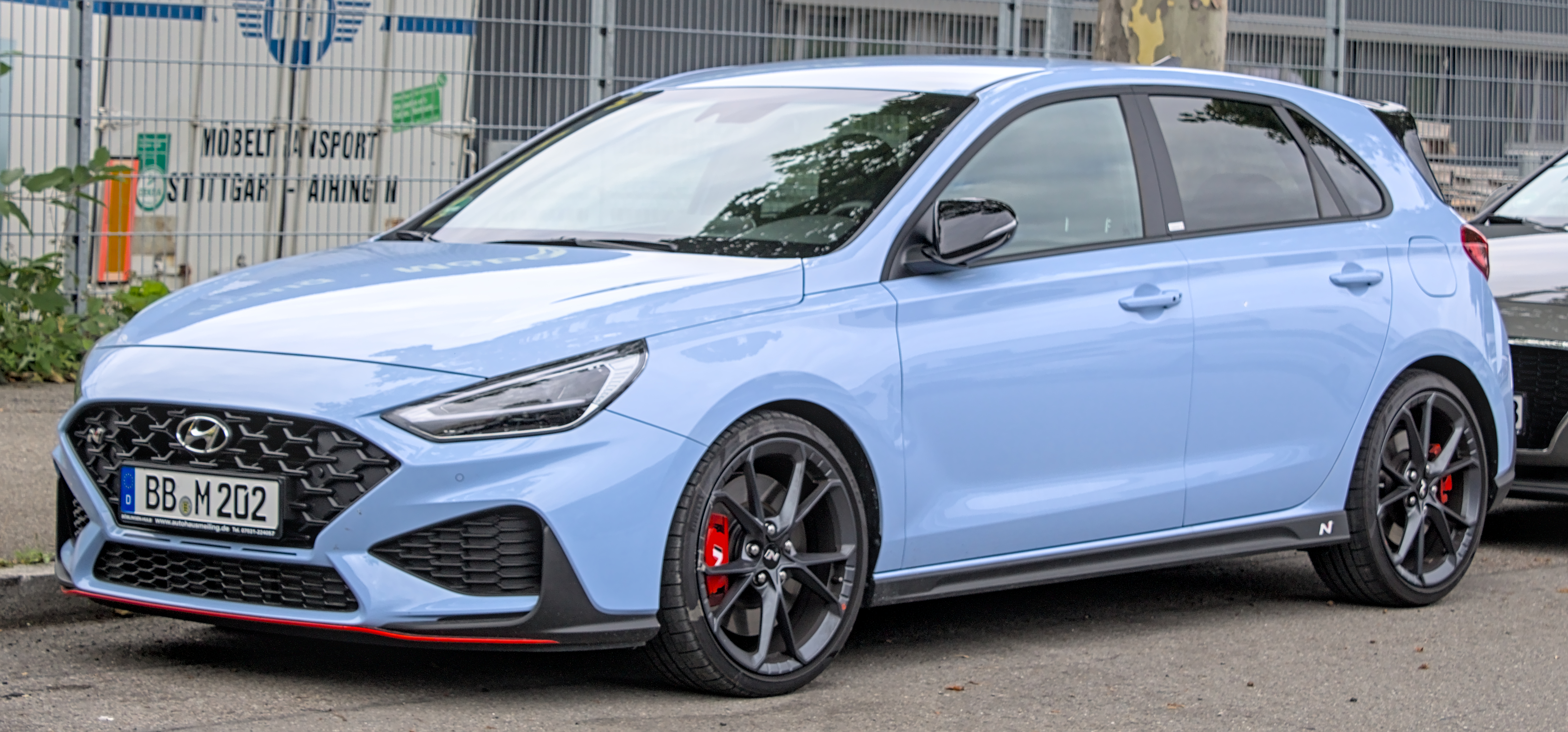
i30 N (facelift)

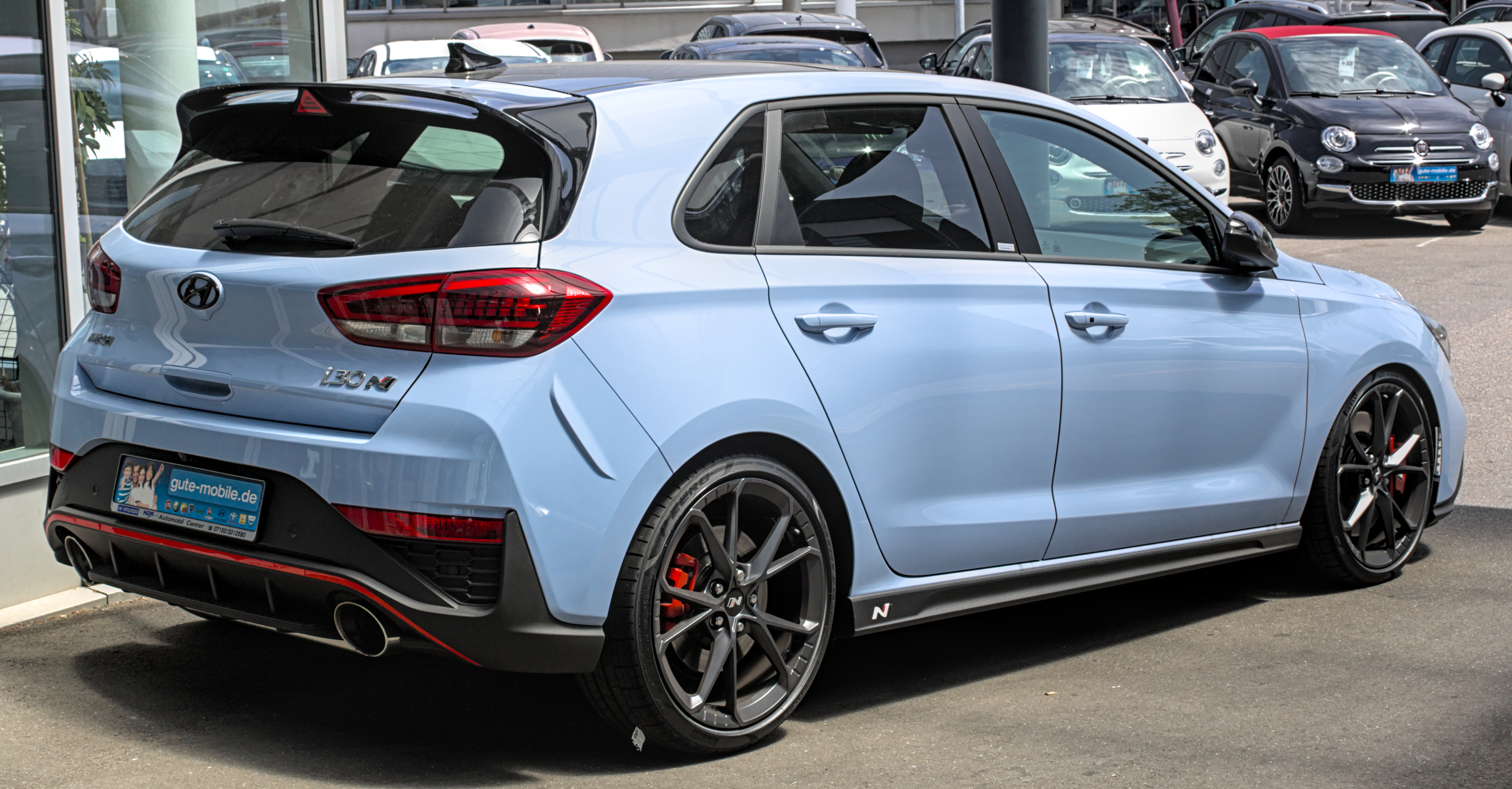
i30 N (facelift)

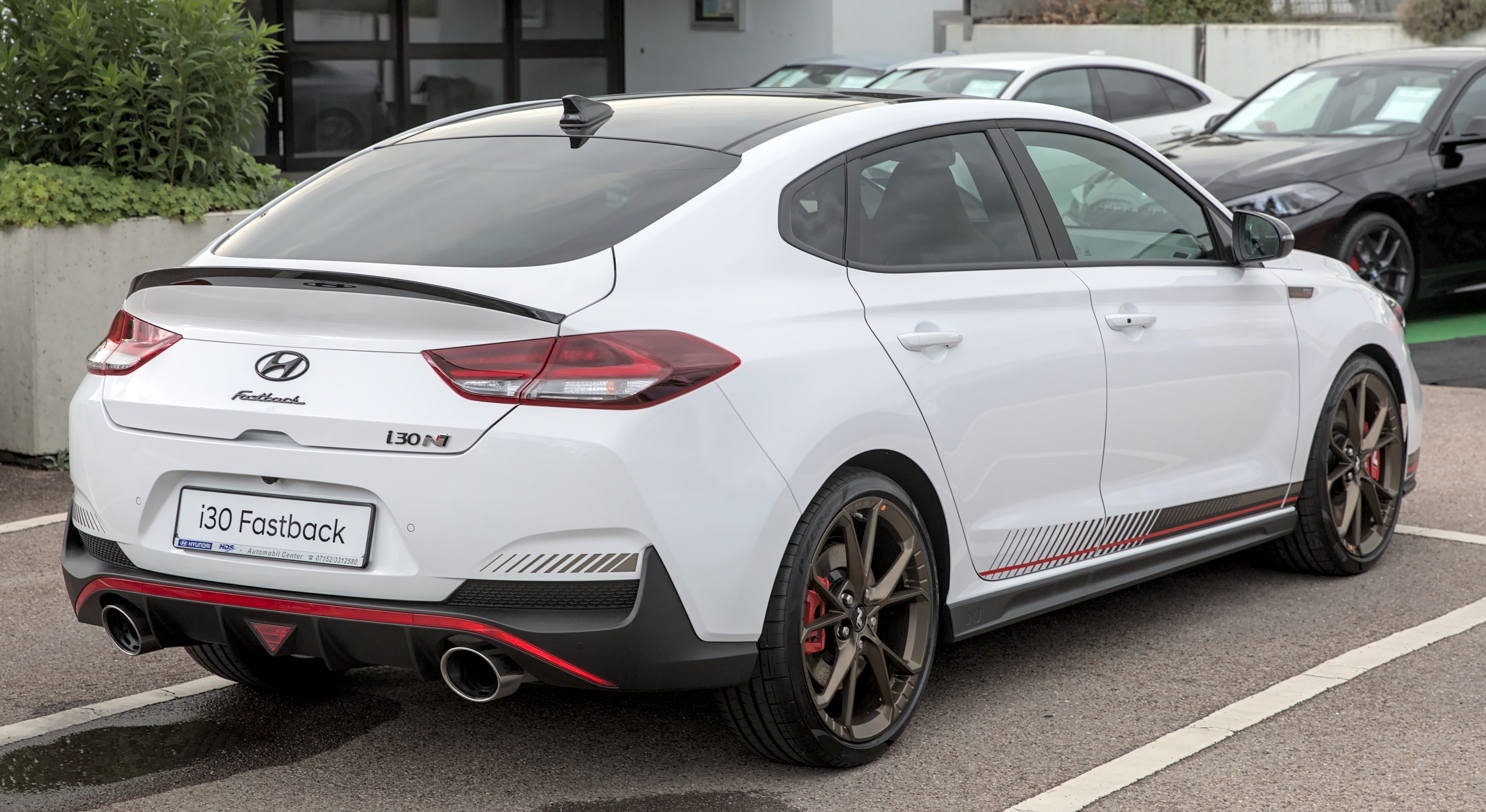
i30 Fastback N (facelift)

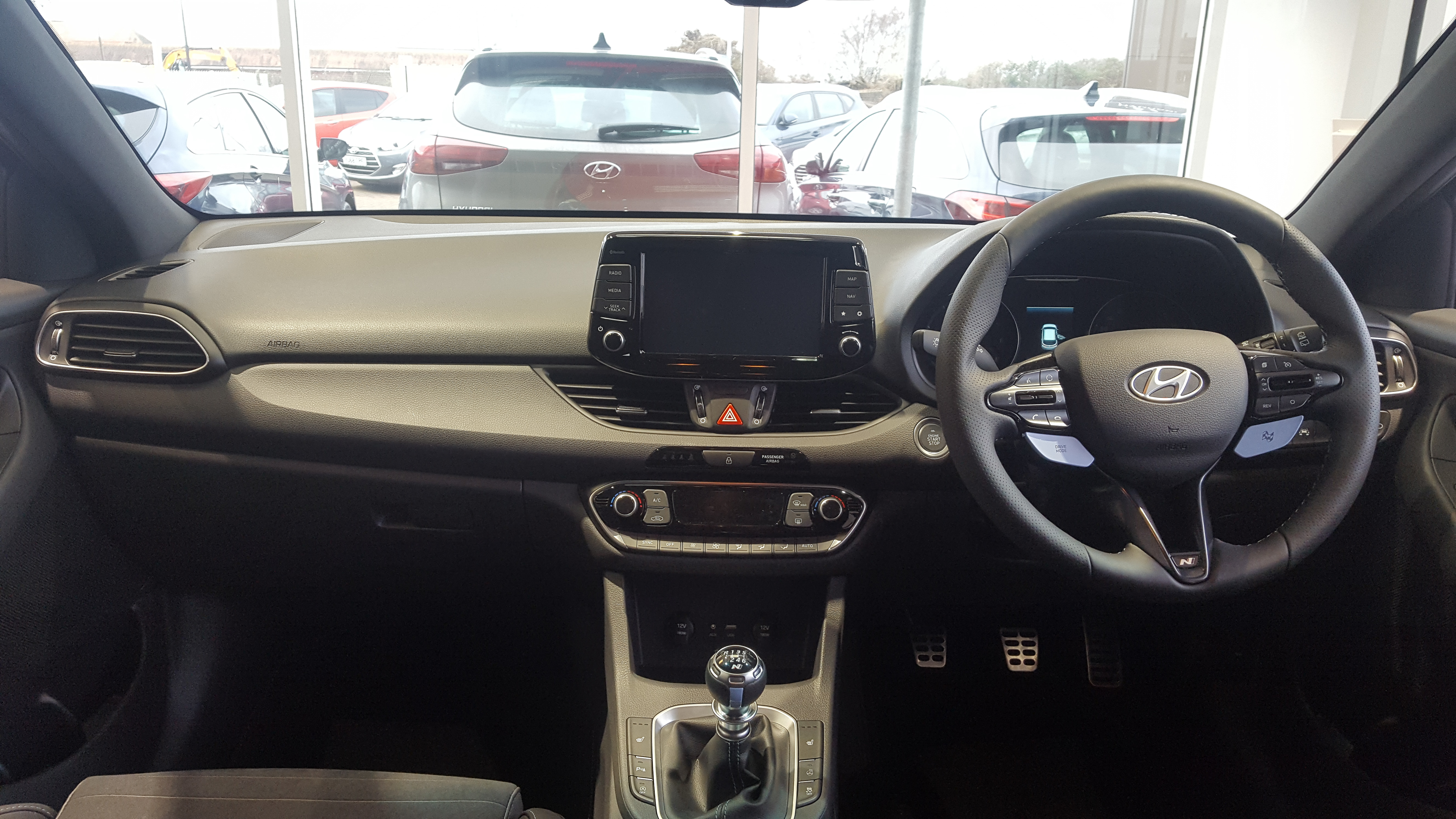
Interior (i30 N; pre-facelift, RHD)

=== First facelift (2020) ===
The updated Hyundai i30 range including the N Line Wagon was revealed in February 2020. Features include slimmer LED headlamps, 18-inch alloy wheels, 7-inch digital instrument cluster, 10.25-inch touchscreen infotainment system, and Hyundai SmartSense advanced safety package.

The 1.0-litre T-GDi and 1.5-litre T-GDi engines are coupled with a 48-volt mild hybrid technology.

In the United Kingdom three trim levels were available; the base SE Connect, the mid-line N Line trim adding a sporty look, and the top of the range Premium. The N Line is only available with the 1.5-litre T-GDi unit which produces 159PS through either a 6-speed manual gearbox or a 7-speed DCT gearbox, whilst the SE Connect and Premium are only available with the 1.0-litre T-GDi engine.

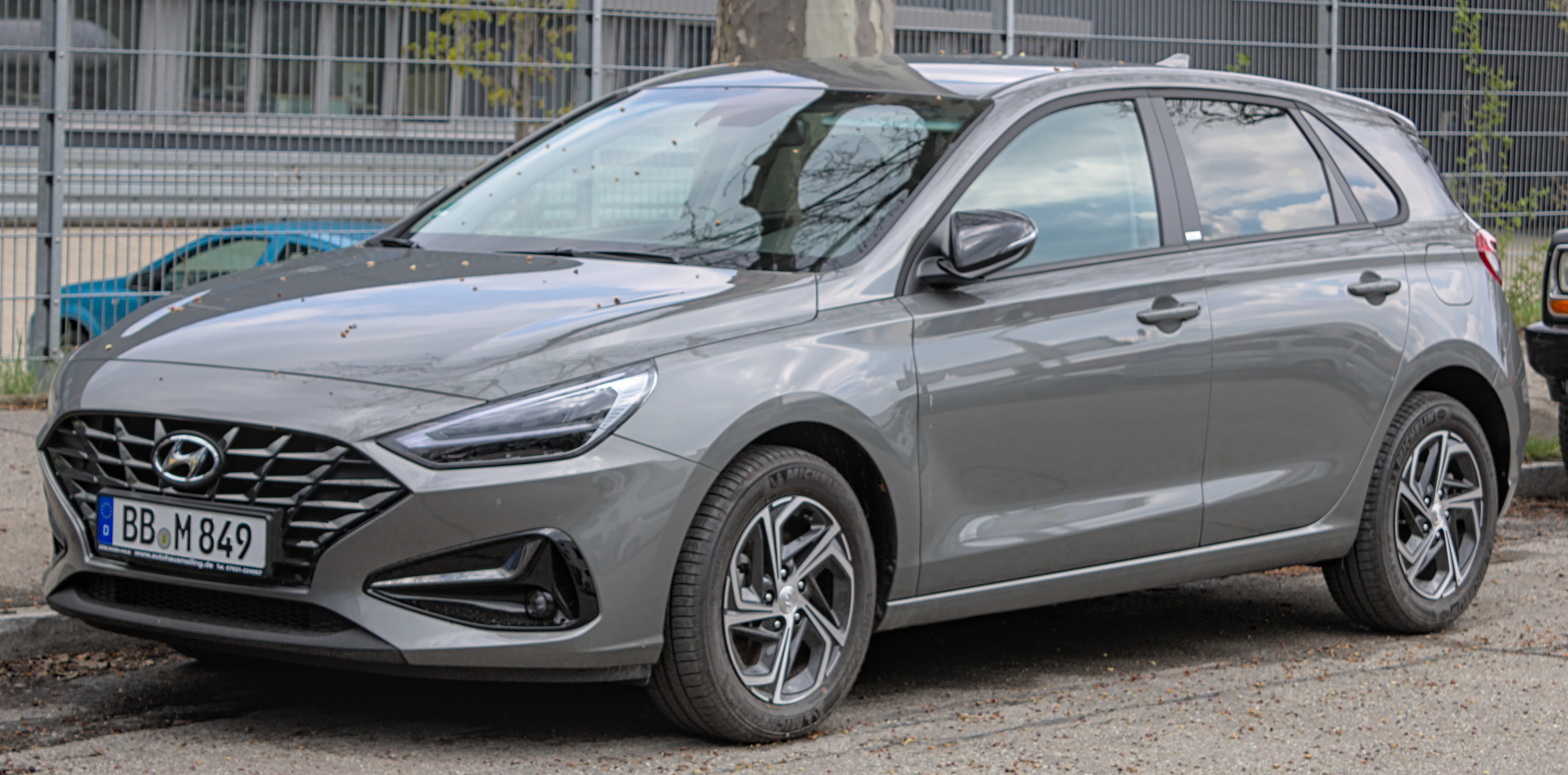
First facelift i30

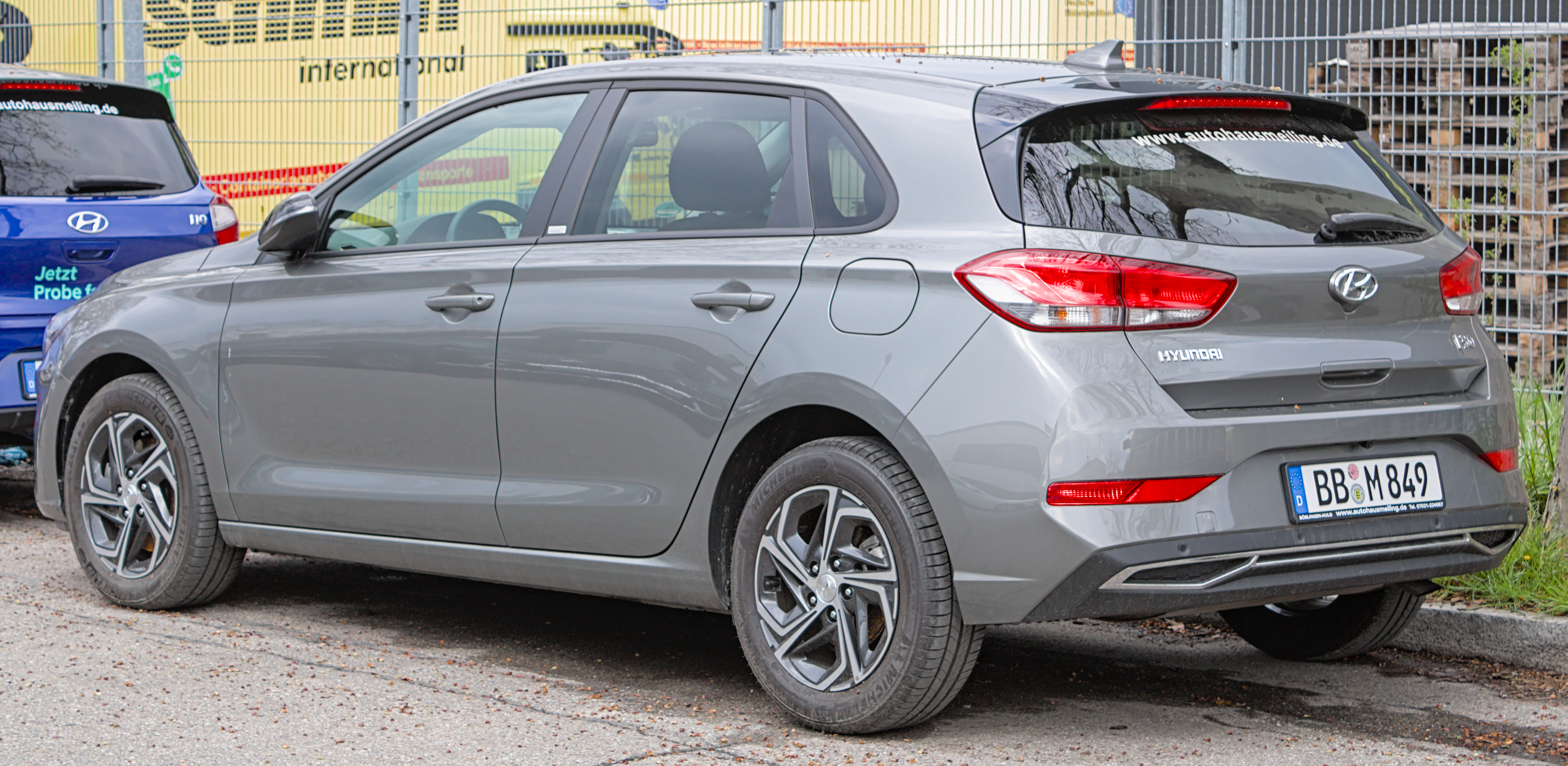
First facelift i30

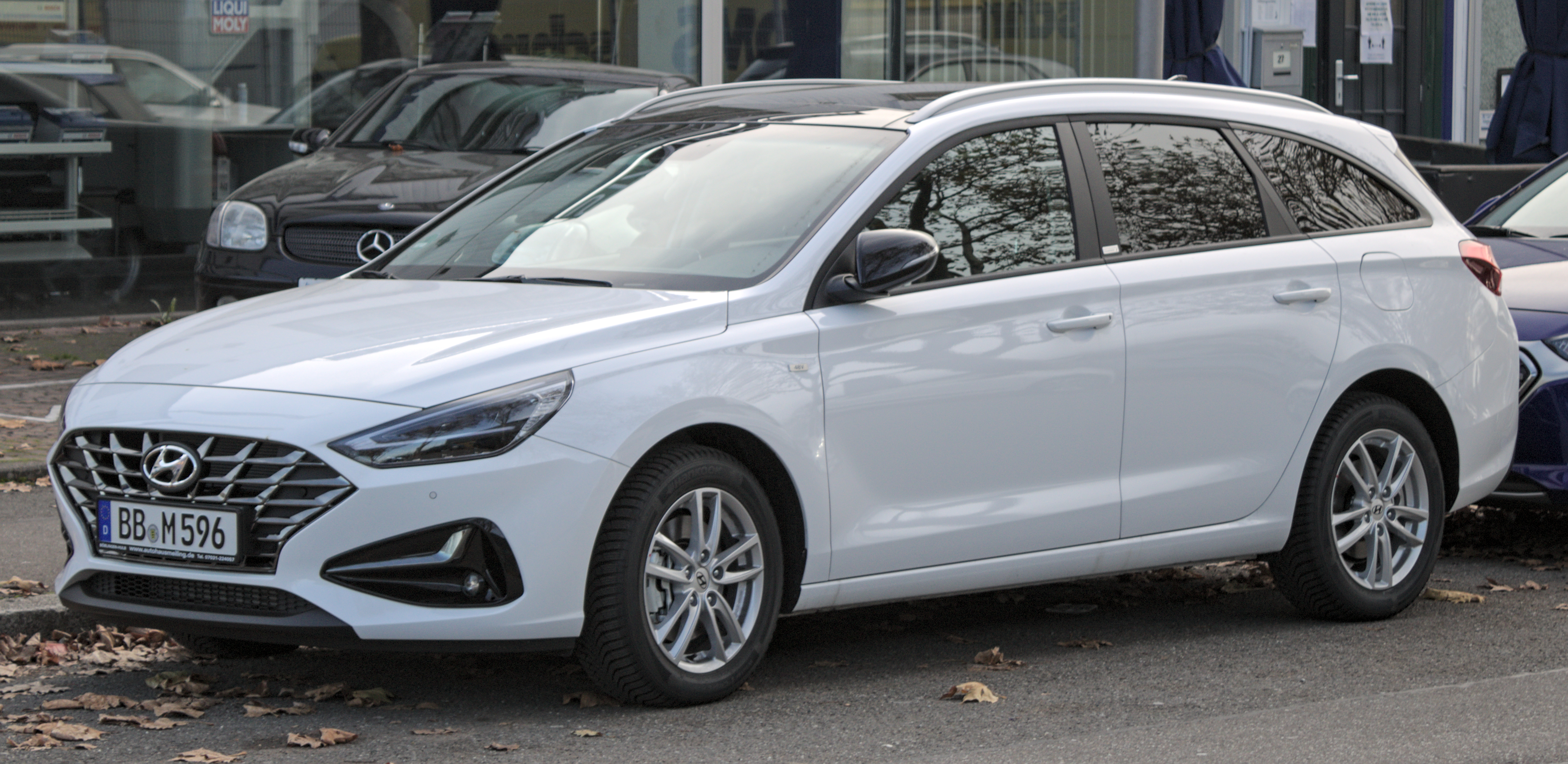
First facelift i30 Touring

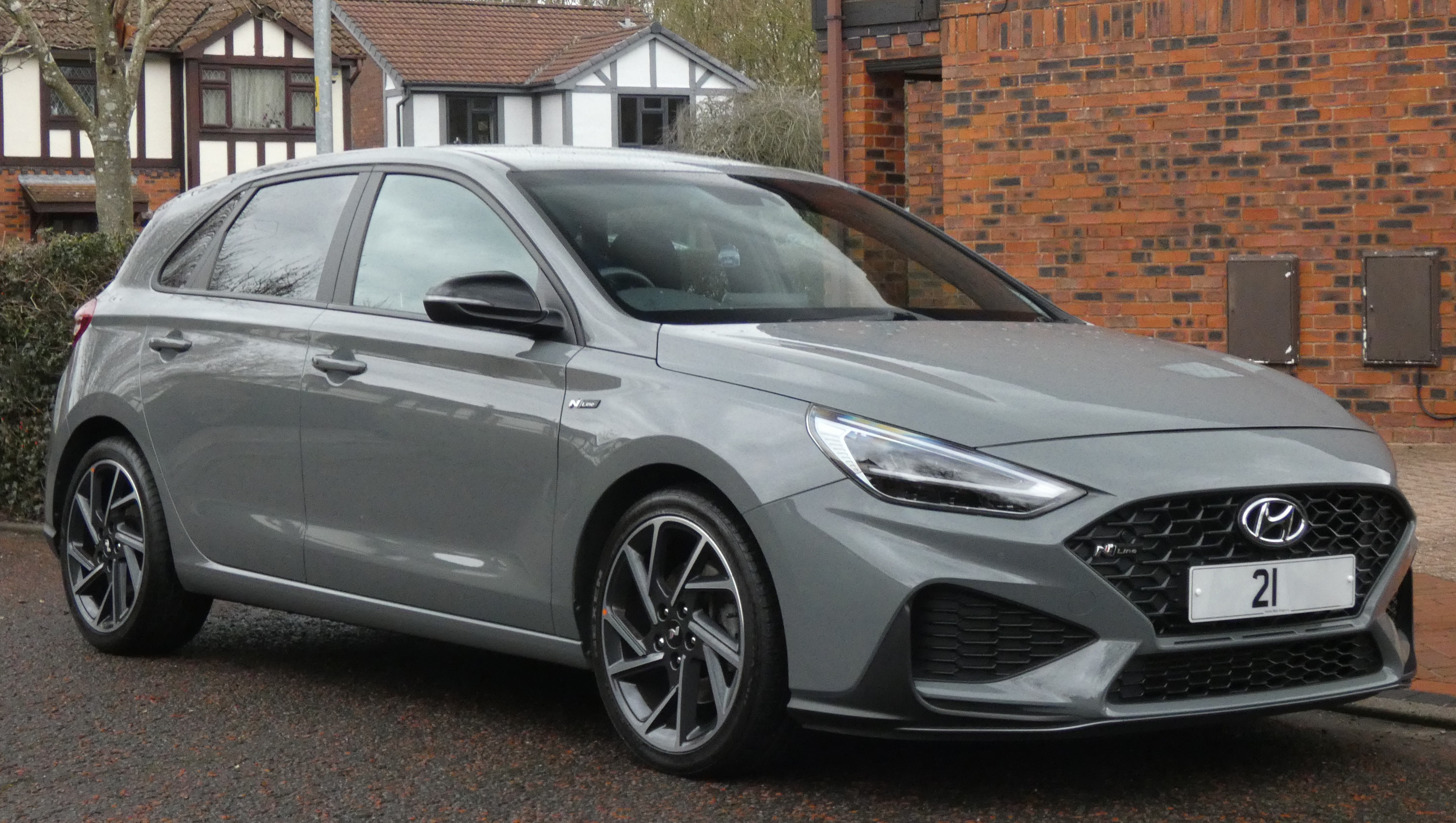
First facelift i30 N Line

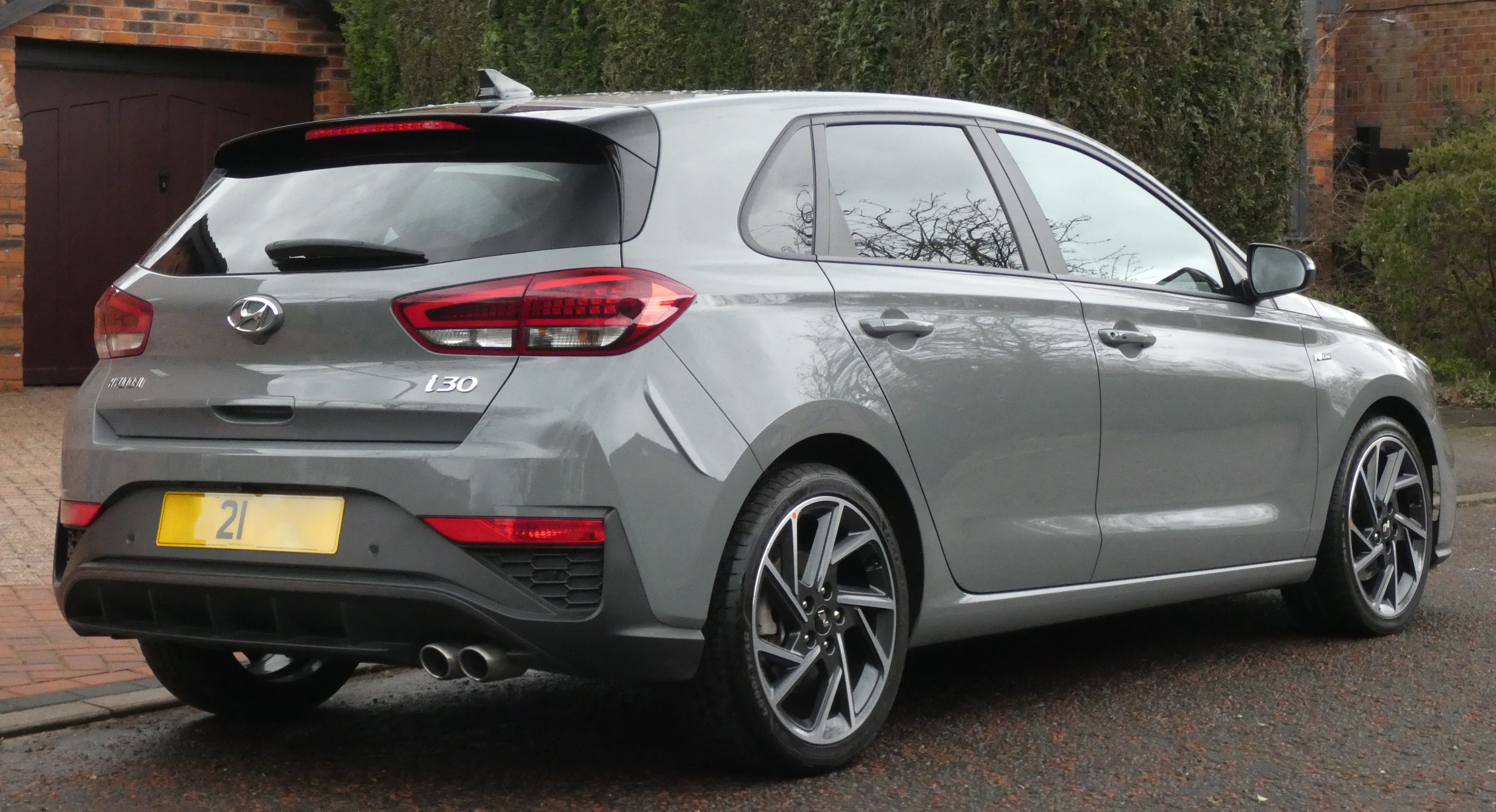
First facelift i30 N Line

=== Second facelift (2024) ===
In April 2024, the i30 receives a minor update with a redesigned grille and rear bumper. After the facelift, the Active and Elite trim levels were discontinued in Australia, favoring the N-Line and N models.

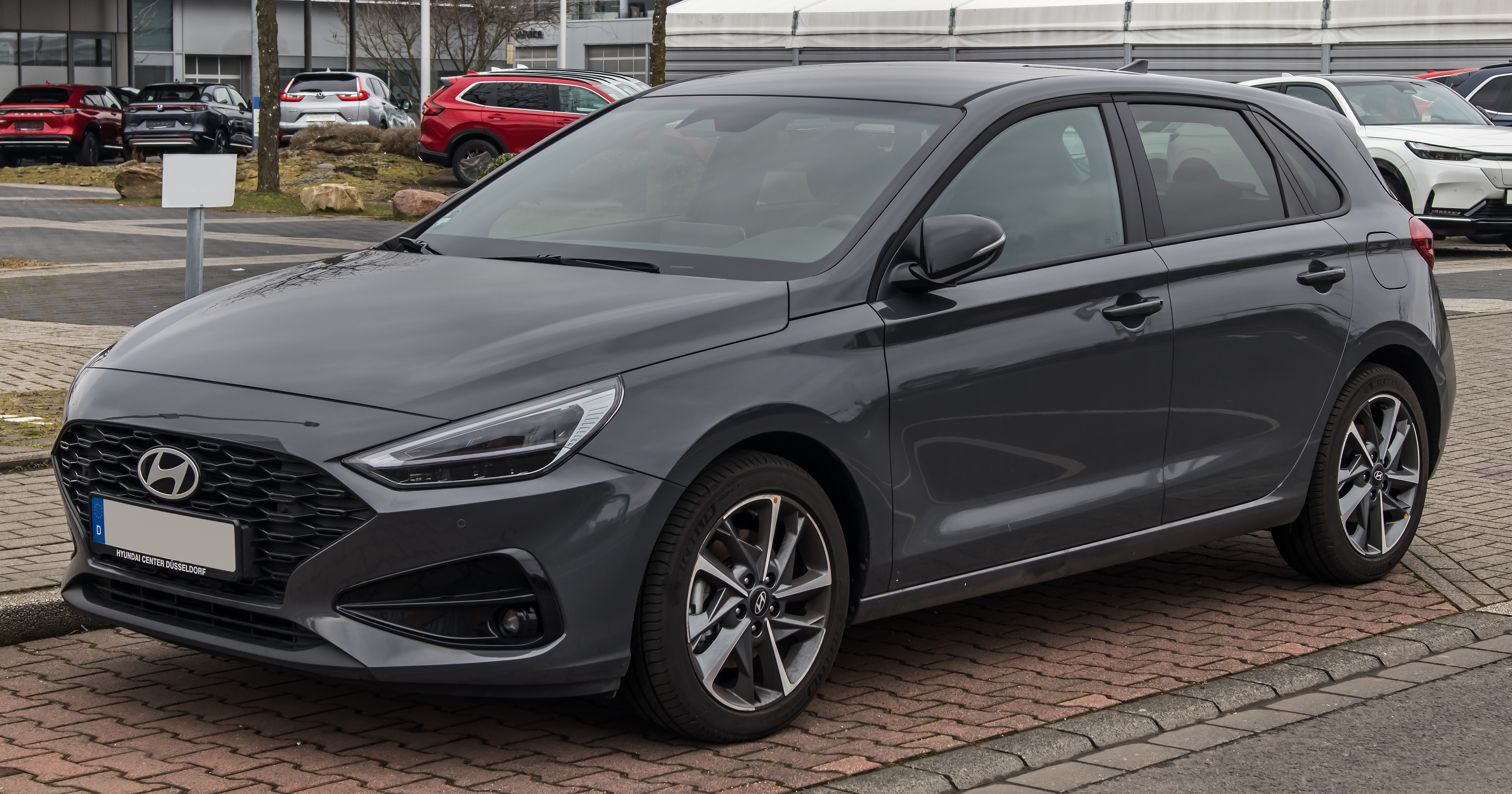
Second facelift i30 (front)

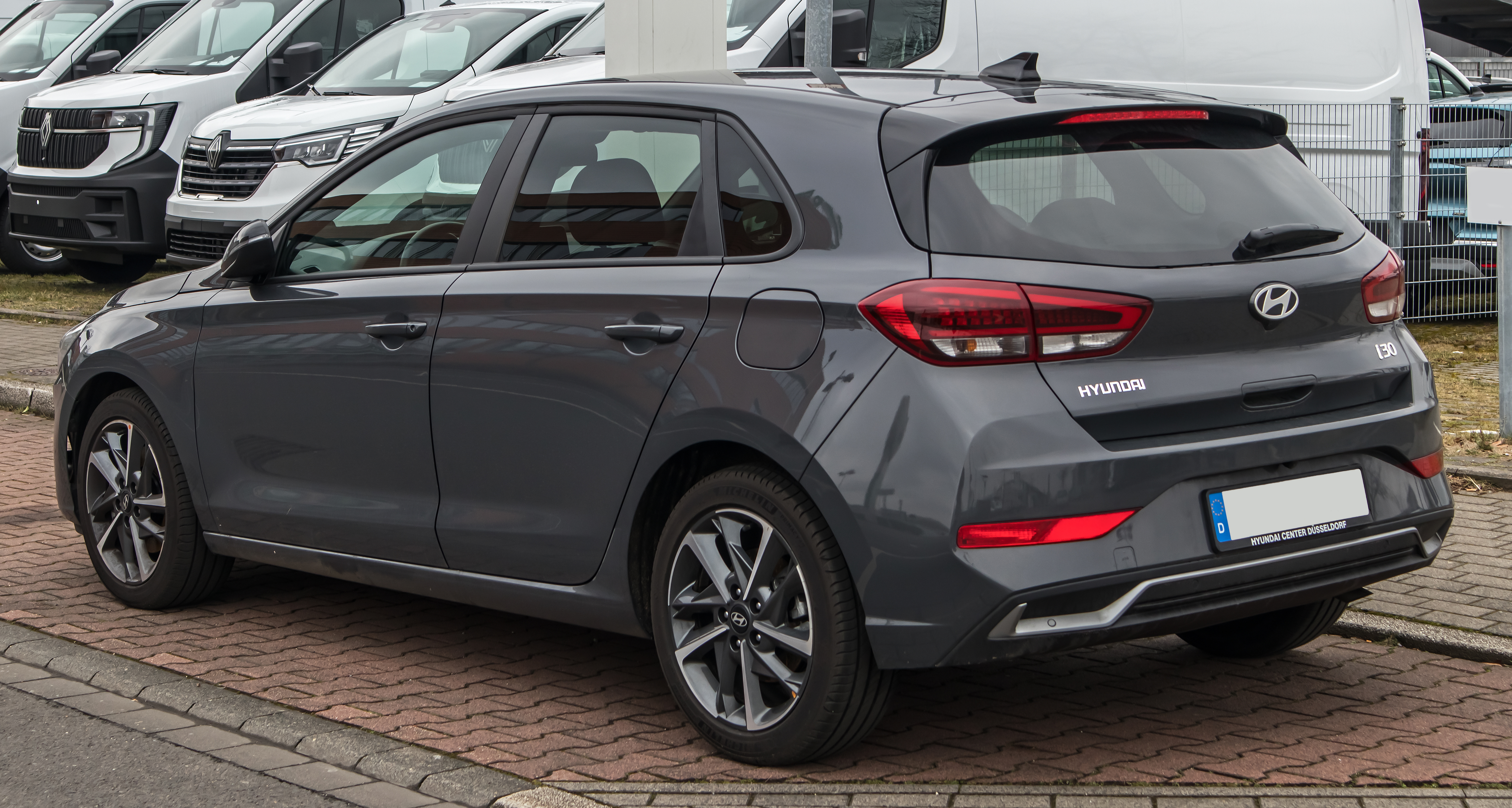
Second facelift i30 (rear)

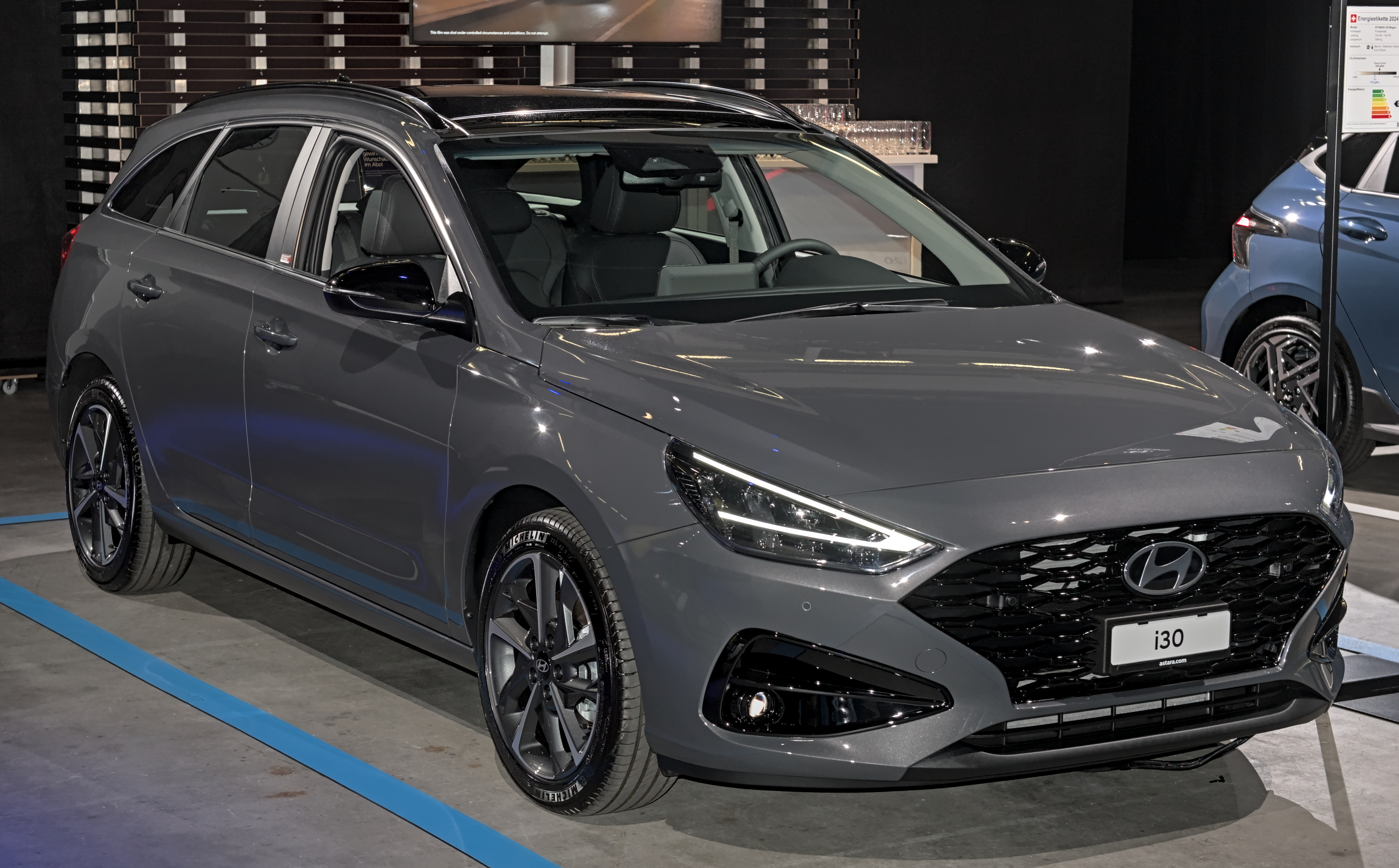
Second facelift i30 Touring (front)

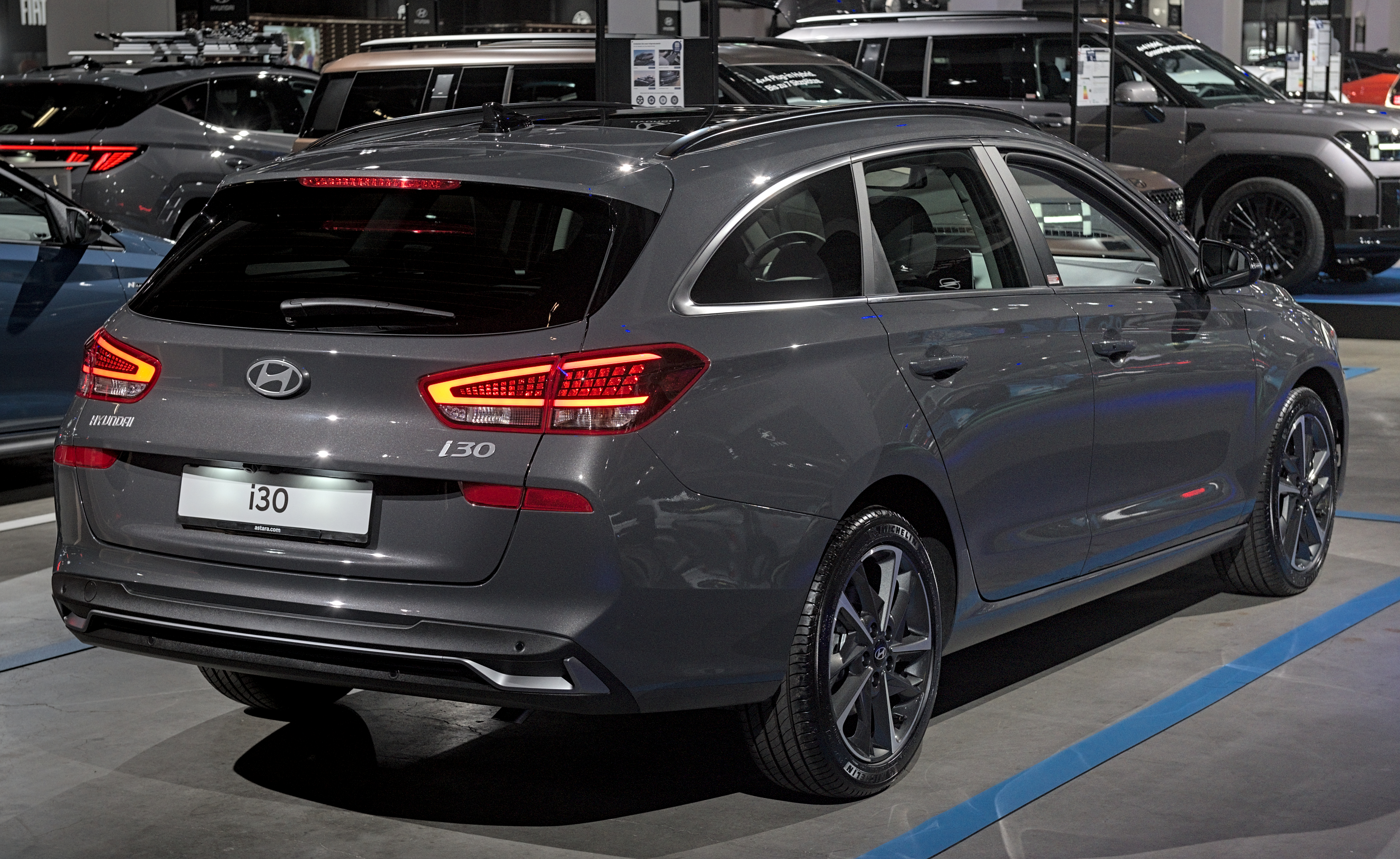
Second facelift i30 Touring (rear)

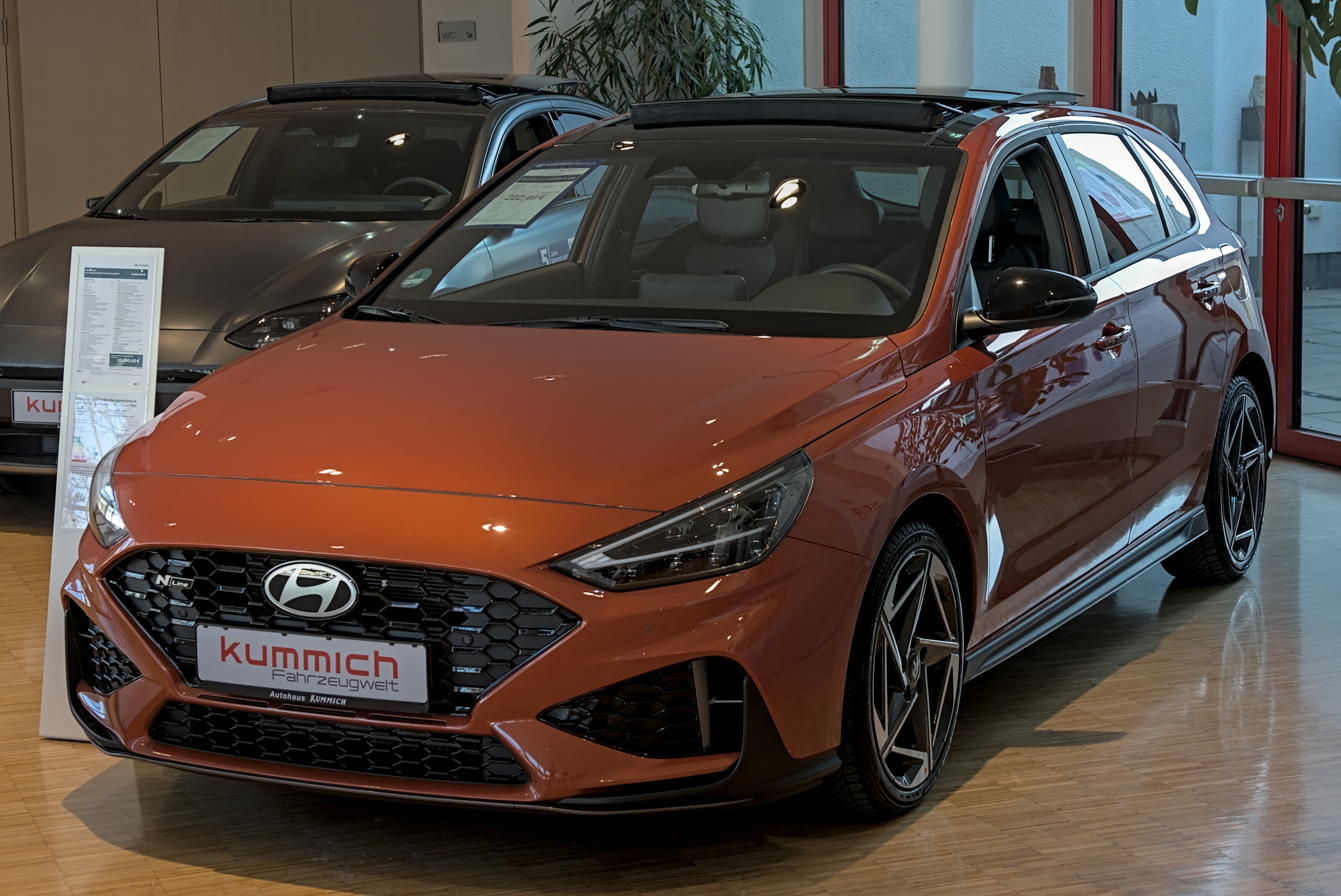
Second facelift i30 N-Line

=== Engines ===
Model	Engine	Power	Torque	0–100 km/h (0–62 mph)		Top Speed
Petrol engines
1.4 Kappa II MPi	1.4 L (1,368 cc) I4	100 PS (74 kW; 99 hp) @ 6000 rpm	134 N⋅m (99 lbf⋅ft) @ 4000 rpm	M:	12.7 s	183 km/h (114 mph)
1.5 Smartstream DPi	1.5 L (1,498 cc) I4	110 PS (81 kW; 108 hp) @ 6000 rpm	144 N⋅m (106 lbf⋅ft) @ 3500 rpm	M:	12.3 s	187 km/h (116 mph)
1.0 Kappa II T-GDi	1.0 L (998 cc) I3	120 PS (88 kW; 118 hp) @ 6000 rpm	171 N⋅m (126 lbf⋅ft) @ 1500–4500 rpm	M:	11.1 s	190 km/h (118 mph)
Smartstream G1.0 T-GDi	1.0 L (998 cc) I3	120 PS (88 kW; 118 hp) @ 6000 rpm	171 N⋅m (126 lbf⋅ft) @ 1500–4500 rpm	M:	11.2 s	196 km/h (122 mph)
Smartstream G1.0 T-GDi	1.0 L (998 cc) I3	120 PS (88 kW; 118 hp) @ 6000 rpm	171 N⋅m (126 lbf⋅ft) @ 1500–4500 rpm	D:	11.2 s	196 km/h (122 mph)
1.6 Gamma II MPi	1.6 L (1,591 cc) I4	128 PS (94 kW; 126 hp) @ 6300 rpm	155 N⋅m (114 lbf⋅ft) @ 4850 rpm	M:	10.5 s	195 km/h (121 mph)
1.6 Gamma II MPi	1.6 L (1,591 cc) I4	128 PS (94 kW; 126 hp) @ 6300 rpm	155 N⋅m (114 lbf⋅ft) @ 4850 rpm	A:	11.5 s	192 km/h (119 mph)
1.4 Kappa II T-GDi	1.4 L (1,353 cc) I4	140 PS (103 kW; 138 hp) @ 6000 rpm	242 N⋅m (178 lbf⋅ft) @ 1500–3200 rpm	M:	8.9 s	210 km/h (130 mph)
1.4 Kappa II T-GDi	1.4 L (1,353 cc) I4	140 PS (103 kW; 138 hp) @ 6000 rpm	242 N⋅m (178 lbf⋅ft) @ 1500–3200 rpm	D:	9.2 s	205 km/h (127 mph)
Smartstream G1.5 T-GDi	1.5 L (1,482 cc) I4	160 PS (118 kW; 158 hp) @ 6000 rpm	253 N⋅m (187 lbf⋅ft) @ 1500–3500 rpm	M:	8.4 s	210 km/h (130 mph)
Smartstream G1.5 T-GDi	1.5 L (1,482 cc) I4	160 PS (118 kW; 158 hp) @ 6000 rpm	253 N⋅m (187 lbf⋅ft) @ 1500–3500 rpm	D:	8.6 s	210 km/h (130 mph)
2.0 Nu GDi	2.0 L (1,999 cc) I4	164 PS (121 kW; 162 hp) @ 6200 rpm	203 N⋅m (150 lbf⋅ft) @ 4700 rpm	M:	8.9 s	210 km/h (130 mph)
2.0 Nu GDi	2.0 L (1,999 cc) I4	164 PS (121 kW; 162 hp) @ 6200 rpm	203 N⋅m (150 lbf⋅ft) @ 4700 rpm	A:	9.2 s	208 km/h (129 mph)
1.6 Gamma II T-GDi	1.6 L (1,591 cc) I4	204 PS (150 kW; 201 hp) @ 6000 rpm	265 N⋅m (195 lbf⋅ft) @ 1500–4500 rpm	M:	7.5 s	221 km/h (137 mph)
1.6 Gamma II T-GDi	1.6 L (1,591 cc) I4	204 PS (150 kW; 201 hp) @ 6000 rpm	265 N⋅m (195 lbf⋅ft) @ 1500–4500 rpm	D:	7.2 s	220 km/h (137 mph)
2.0 Theta II T-GDi	2.0 L (1,999 cc) I4	250 PS (184 kW; 247 hp) @ 6000 rpm 275 PS (202 kW; 271 hp) @ 6000 rpm	353 N⋅m (260 lbf⋅ft) @ 1500–4000 rpm 353 N⋅m (260 lbf⋅ft) @ 1500–4700 rpm	M:	6.4 s 6.1 s	250 km/h (155 mph)
2.0 Theta II T-GDi	2.0 L (1,999 cc) I4	280 PS (206 kW; 276 hp) @ 5500–6000 rpm	392 N⋅m (289 lbf⋅ft) @ 2100–4700 rpm	M:	5.9 s	250 km/h (155 mph)
2.0 Theta II T-GDi	2.0 L (1,999 cc) I4	280 PS (206 kW; 276 hp) @ 5500–6000 rpm	392 N⋅m (289 lbf⋅ft) @ 2100–4700 rpm	D:	5.4 s	250 km/h (155 mph)
Diesel engines
1.6 U CRDi	1.6 L (1,582 cc) I4	95 PS (70 kW; 94 hp) @ 4000 rpm	280 N⋅m (207 lbf⋅ft) @ 1500–2000 rpm	M:	11.6 s	181 km/h (112 mph)
Smartstream D1.6 CRDi	1.6 L (1,598 cc) I4	136 PS (100 kW; 134 hp) at 4000 rpm	280 N⋅m (210 lbf⋅ft) at 1500–2750 rpm	M:	10.9 s	200 km/h (124 mph)
Smartstream D1.6 CRDi	1.6 L (1,598 cc) I4	136 PS (100 kW; 134 hp) at 4000 rpm	300 N⋅m (220 lbf⋅ft) at 1500–2500 rpm	D:	10.9 s	200 km/h (124 mph)
1.6 U II CRDi	1.6 L (1,582 cc) I4	115 PS (85 kW; 113 hp) at 4000 rpm	300 N⋅m (220 lbf⋅ft) at 1750–2500 rpm	M:	10.2 s	192 km/h (119 mph)
1.6 U II CRDi	1.6 L (1,582 cc) I4	115 PS (85 kW; 113 hp) at 4000 rpm	300 N⋅m (220 lbf⋅ft) at 1750–2500 rpm	D:	9.6 s	192 km/h (119 mph)
Smartstream D1.6 CRDi	1.6 L (1,598 cc) I4	136 PS (100 kW; 134 hp) at 4000 rpm	280 N⋅m (210 lbf⋅ft) at 1500–3000 rpm	M:	10.2 s	200 km/h (124 mph)
Smartstream D1.6 CRDi	1.6 L (1,598 cc) I4	136 PS (100 kW; 134 hp) at 4000 rpm	300 N⋅m (220 lbf⋅ft) at 2000–2250 rpm	D:	9.9 s	200 km/h (124 mph)

=== Safety ===
ANCAP test results* Hyundai i30 all hatch variants (excluding i30N) (2017)
Test	Score
Overall	5 /5 stars
Frontal offset	14.01/16
Side impact	16/16
Pole	2/2
Seat belt reminders	3/3
Whiplash protection	Good
Pedestrian protection	Adequate
Electronic stability control	Standard

ANCAP test results* Hyundai i30 all wagon variants (2017)
Test	Score
Overall	5 /5 stars
Frontal offset	14.01/16
Side impact	16/16
Pole	2/2
Seat belt reminders	3/3
Whiplash protection	Good
Pedestrian protection	Adequate
Electronic stability control	Standard

== i30 Sedan ==
The Hyundai Elantra (CN7) is sold as the i30 sedan in Australia, leveraging the use of the widely known "i30" nameplate there.

== Motorsport ==
A TCR racing version of the i30 N has been raced by various customer teams since 2017. Gabriele Tarquini and M Racing-YMR won the 2018 World Touring Car Cup titles with the car. Tarquini's teammate Norbert Michelisz won a further drivers' cup in 2019.

A version of the i30 was developed for Next Generation Touring Car regulations for competition in the British Touring Car Championship, with its debut coming in 2020. This version of the car was titled the "i30 Fastback N Performance." The BTCC version of the car saw success, with Tom Ingram driving the car to the drivers' championship in 2022 and 2025.

== Sales ==
Year	Europe	Australia	China
2006	3		
2007	22,746		
2008	57,096		
2009	93,025	21,414	12,494
2010	114,849	29,772	19,858
2011	101,421	28,869	9,792
2012	96,706	28,348	1,645
2013	97,865	30,582	3
2014	81,686	31,505	
2015	89,957	32,306	
2016	77,011	37,772	
2017	75,802	28,780	
2018	79,497	28,188	
2019	75,739	28,378	
2020	50,483	20,734	
2021	50,763	25,575	
2022	45,396	21,166	
2023	39,889	20,626	
2024	39,734	12,682	

== See also ==
- List of Hyundai vehicles
