= APM =

APM, apm, or Apm may refer to:

== Technology ==
=== Computer technology ===
- Active policy management, a discipline within enterprise software
- Advanced Power Management, a legacy technology in personal computers
- Apple Partition Map, computer disk partition scheme
- Application performance management, a discipline within systems management

=== Other ===
- Accurate Pistonic Motion, a line of stereo speakers using square drivers manufactured by Sony
- ArduPilotMega (APM), an open source unmanned aerial vehicle (UAV) platform
- Attached Pressurized Module, the former name of the Columbus module of the International Space Station
- Automated people mover, a driverless train often used in large airports

== Social sciences and management ==
- Agile project management, a style of project management for agile software development projects
- Application portfolio management
- Advanced Progressive Matrices, a subset of Raven's Progressive Matrices which is an intelligence test

== Police and military ==
- Australian Police Medal, awarded for distinguished service by a member of an Australian police force
- Assistant Provost Marshal, a military role and title
- Anti-personnel mine, a type of explosive used against people
- Army of the Republic of Macedonia
- A retired US Navy hull classification symbol: Mechanized artillery transport (APM)

== Organizations and companies ==
=== United States ===
- American Peace Mobilization, a communist front group active before the Nazi invasion of the Soviet Union during World War II
- American Poetry Museum, Washington D.C., USA
- American Public Media, the production and distribution arm of Minnesota Public Radio (MPR)
- Applied Micro Circuits Corporation, a fabless semiconductor company in the Silicon Valley
- Associated Production Music, a large production music company

=== China ===
==== Mainland ====
- Beijing apm, a shopping center and office tower in Beijing, China

==== Hong Kong and Macau ====
- Apm (Hong Kong), a shopping centre and office tower in Kwun Tong, New Kowloon, Hong Kong

=== United Kingdom ===
- Association for Project Management in the United Kingdom
- K Sports F.C., a football club in England previously known as APM

=== Other ===
- APM Monaco, a fashion jewelry company
- APM Terminals, container terminal operator based in the Netherlands
- Allied Peoples Movement, a Nigerian political party
- Australian Paper Mills, former business in Melbourne
- Association Professionnelle des Magistrats (APM), France

== Other ==
- Actions per minute, a term used in real-time strategy games
- Aspartame, an artificial, non-saccharide sweetener
