= National Strategy for Inner Areas =

Italian territorial policy

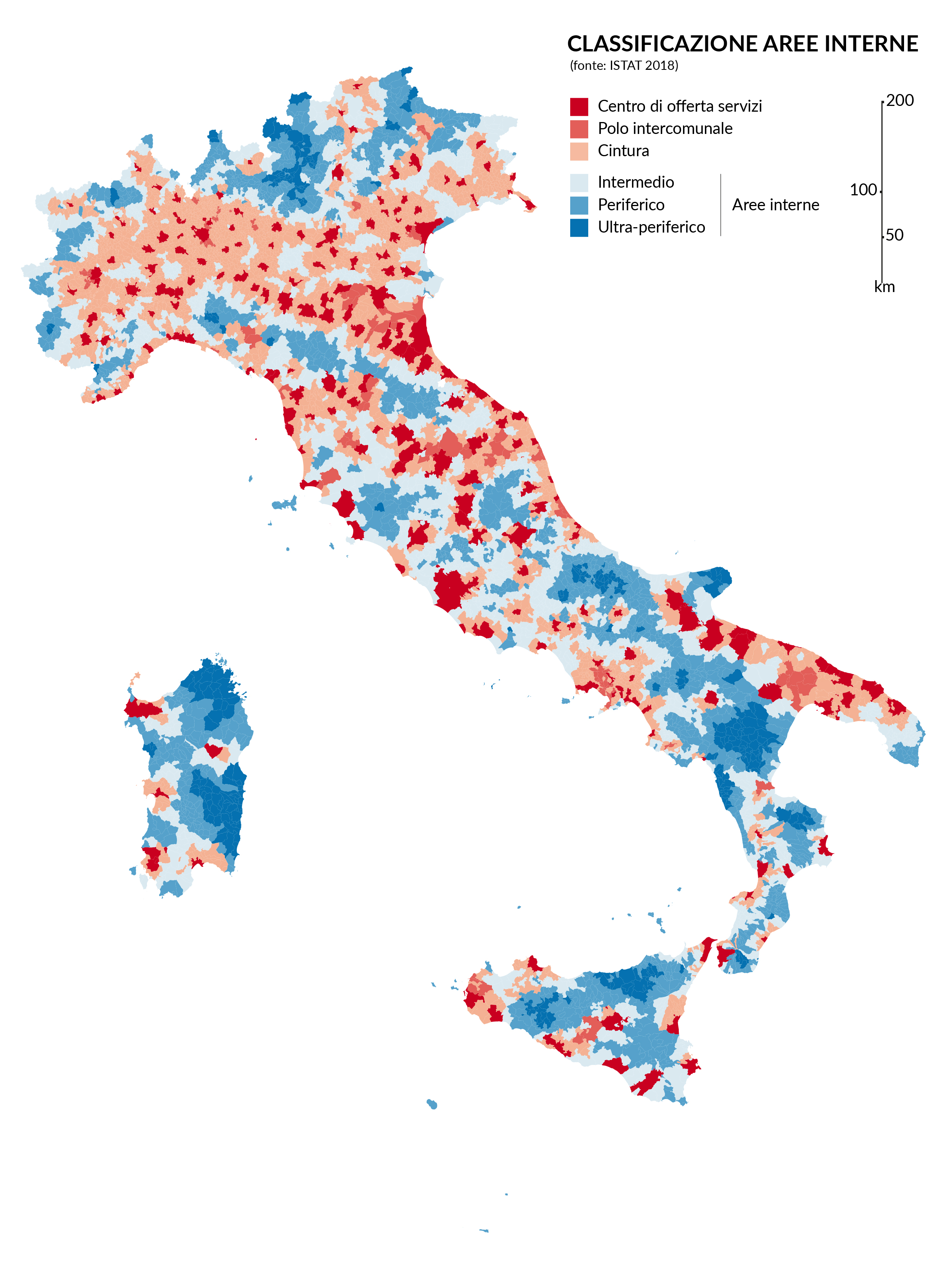
Map of Italian inner areas - source: ISTAT

The National Strategy for Inner Areas (SNAI; Italian: Strategia nazionale per le aree interne) is an Italian policy developed in 2013 and promoted by the Agency for Territorial Cohesion (Dipartimento per la coesione territoriale) and then by the Minister for Territorial Cohesion Fabrizio Barca that aims at enhancing the territorial reactivation of remote municipalities. The document proposes a classification of municipalities according to the spatial inequalities, the different level of accessibility to basic public services. The document then suggests a series of actions and active policies to counteract, or at least mitigate, the demographic decline and the territorial marginalization process. Most of the inner areas are concentrated in the Alpine and Apennine areas and present a significant depopulation and a lack of basic services for residents (health, education, mobility). At the same time, these areas have a high availability of important environmental resources (water resources, agricultural systems, forests, natural and human landscapes) and cultural resources (archaeological heritage, historical settlements, abbeys, small museums, craft centers).

Since World War II, inner areas commonly feature a gradually marginalization and fragilization process of their local capitals mainly due to the migration towards the economic centers of the country. This process has in fact caused the progressive loss of human and know-how capitals which compromised the territorial and relations systems, and the local economic, cultural and social development.

== Definition ==
SNAI defines inner areas according to the accessibility level to basic public services and infrastructures (i.e. public health facilities, secondary education and the proximity to public transport and roads). From these parameters, the document then proposes a classification for all the Italian municipalities.

SNAI classifies municipalities according to the presence of essential public services and infrastructure. These territories, defined as service provider centers, must be place of:

- at least one hospital with an emergency department;
- secondary schools, and;
- one railway station.

From this category, municipalities are further classified in intermunicipal poles and poles if province capitals thanks to the presence of provincial management services.

Other municipalities are then classified according to the travel time residents must make to reach the nearest service provider center:

- Belt areas, travel time under 20 minutes;
- Intermediate areas, between 20 and 40 minutes;
- Peripheral areas, between 40 and 75 minutes;
- Ultra-peripheral areas, with a travel time above 75 minutes.

The document finally defines as inner areas all the municipalities which travel time is above 20 minutes: intermediate, peripheral and ultra-peripheral areas. According to this classification inner areas cover 60% of the national territory, 52% of all municipalities, and 22% of the Italian population.

Features of the municipalities according to SNAI classification
Classification	Municipalities	%	Average elevation	Population 2011	%	Demographic trend 1971-2011 (%)	Area (kmq)	%
Poles	219	2.7	145	21,223,562	35.7	−6.8	29,519	9.8
Intermunicipal poles	104	1.3	166	2,466,455	4.1	22.7	6,251	2.1
Belt areas	3,508	43.4	215	22,203,219	37.4	35.8	81,815	27.1
Intermediate areas	2,377	29.4	395	8,952,266	15.1	11.6	89,448	29.6
Peripheral areas	1,526	18.9	607	3,671,372	6.2	−8.1	73,256	24.3
Ultra-peripheral areas	358	4.4	627	916,870	1.5	−5.3	21,784	7.2

== Strategies and actions ==
To invert, or at least to mitigate the marginalization and depopulation processes, SNAI suggests two set of actions. The first aims at the adjustment and strengthening of the essential public services, the development preconditions which allows the socio-economic development of territories. The second set suggests instead the promotion of local development projects that can induce the reactivation and regeneration of the latent territorial capitals.

=== First set of actions ===
In order to ensure the development preconditions, the policy proposes improving the accessibility to basic services for inner area citizens. The document proposes the strengthening of the health care (first aid, emergencies, delivery points, transfusions point), schools (especially secondary education) and public transport and mobility. SNAI therefore proposes the strengthening of physical and digital infrastructures of areas:

- Public Health Services. The document suggests the reorganization of the territorial health infrastructure with local assistance, telehealth, the establishment of mobile health services and home care. It also proposes the installation of medical equipment (e.g. AEDs and first aid centers) and the training of professionals or voluntareers within the local communities to manage medical emergencies.
- School. SNAI proposes the strengthening of scholastic institutions not only in terms of technology and equipment but also in terms of the educational offer through innovative governance models.
- Mobility. The strategy considers two types of action: strengthening and rethinking the service localization, and improving public transport and road conditions to reduce travel time. These actions suggest the infrastructural enhancement, the recovery of disused routes, and new mobility models.

=== Second set of actions ===
Considering the features of each inner area, the document suggests guidelines for place-based development projects which can reactivate the local social and economic capitals. The strategy proposes to focus on the local potentialities and vocations in order to trigger sustainable development processes with visible, measurable and medium-term results. Specifically, SNAI proposes five points on which projects should be based:

- Landscape and local community protection by at securing territories from the hydro-geological and seismic risk, and the development of care, prevention and governance practices (e.g. common management of services).
- Cultural and natural resources enhancement, and sustainable tourism practices. The document suggests to invest in the local cultural landscape which is considered as a public asset to enhance also with endogenous human, skills, and economic capitals.
- Agri-food systems and local development. Promoting the local agricultural specialties should foster employment, create new economic activities including innovative businesses, and increase the level of biodiversity.
- Energy saving and local supply chains of renewable energies. SNAI proposes the experimentation of innovative energy projects (smart grid, decentralized energy storages) and new governance model for energy that can make inner areas the places of experimentation and innovation.
- Local know-how and craftsmanship. The document suggests, similarly for the agri-food systems, to enhance the value of local production through technological and social innovation of local skills capital.

== 72 experimental areas ==
The 2014-2020 partnership agreement (in Italian Accordo di partenariato) suggested the individuation of experimental areas where experimenting the strategy with public, European and public-private partnership funds. From this agreement the technical committee for inner areas identified the first 72 experimental areas according to the features of each municipalities and to socio-demographic indicators (the demographic situation, the social and economic conditions, the accessibility level and the governance forms). SNAI also suggested the combined action of all the public administration levels, from the national to the municipal administrations.

Finally, the 72 areas include 1,060 municipalities (13,4%), 2 million citizens (3,3%) and 17% of the national area

Abruzzo

- Basso Sangro – Trigno
- Valfino Vestina
- Valle Roveto
- Subequana
- Alto Aterno – Gran Sasso – Laga

Basilicata

- Alto Bradano
- Montagna Materana
- Marmo Platano
- Mercure-Alto Sinni-Val Sarmento

Calabria

- Grecanica
- Versante Ionico Serre
- Sila e pre Sila
- Area Reventino Savuto

Campania

- Alta Irpinia
- Cilento Interno
- Tammaro – Titerno
- Vallo Di Diano

Emilia-Romagna

- Appennino emiliano
- Basso Ferrarese
- Appennino Piacentino-Parmense
- Alta Valmarecchia

Friuli-Venezia Giulia

- Alta Carnia
- Dolomiti Friulane
- Val Canale – Valli di Fella

Lazio

- Alta Tuscia
- Monti Reatini
- Monti Simbruini
- Valle di Comino

Liguria

- Valle Arroscia
- Beigua e Unione Sol
- Val Di Vara
- Antola-Tigullio

Lombardy

- Valchiavenna
- Appennino lombardo-Oltre Po pavese
- Alta Valtellina
- Alto lago di Como e Valli del Lario

Marche

- Appennino Basso Pesarese e Anconetano
- Ascoli Piceno
- Alto Maceratese

Molise

- Alto Medio Sannio
- Fortore
- Mainarde
- Matese

Piedmont

- Val Bormida
- Val d’Ossola
- Valli di Lanzo
- Valli Maira e Grana

Puglia

- Monti Dauni
- Alta Murgia
- Sud Salento
- Gargano

Sardinia

- Alta Marmilla
- Gennargentu-Mandrolisai

Sicily

- Val Simeto
- Calatino
- Madonie
- Nebrodi
- Terre Sicane

Tuscany

- Garfagnana
- Valdarno e Valdisieve, Mugello e Val di Bisenzio
- Casentino-Valtiberina

Provincia autonoma di Trento

- Tesino
- Val di Sole

Umbria

- Sud-Ovest Orvietano
- Nord-Est Umbria
- Valnerina

Valle d'Aosta

- Bassa Valle
- Grand Paradis

Veneto

- Agordina
- Spettabile Reggenza
- Contratto Di Foce Delta del Po
- Comelico

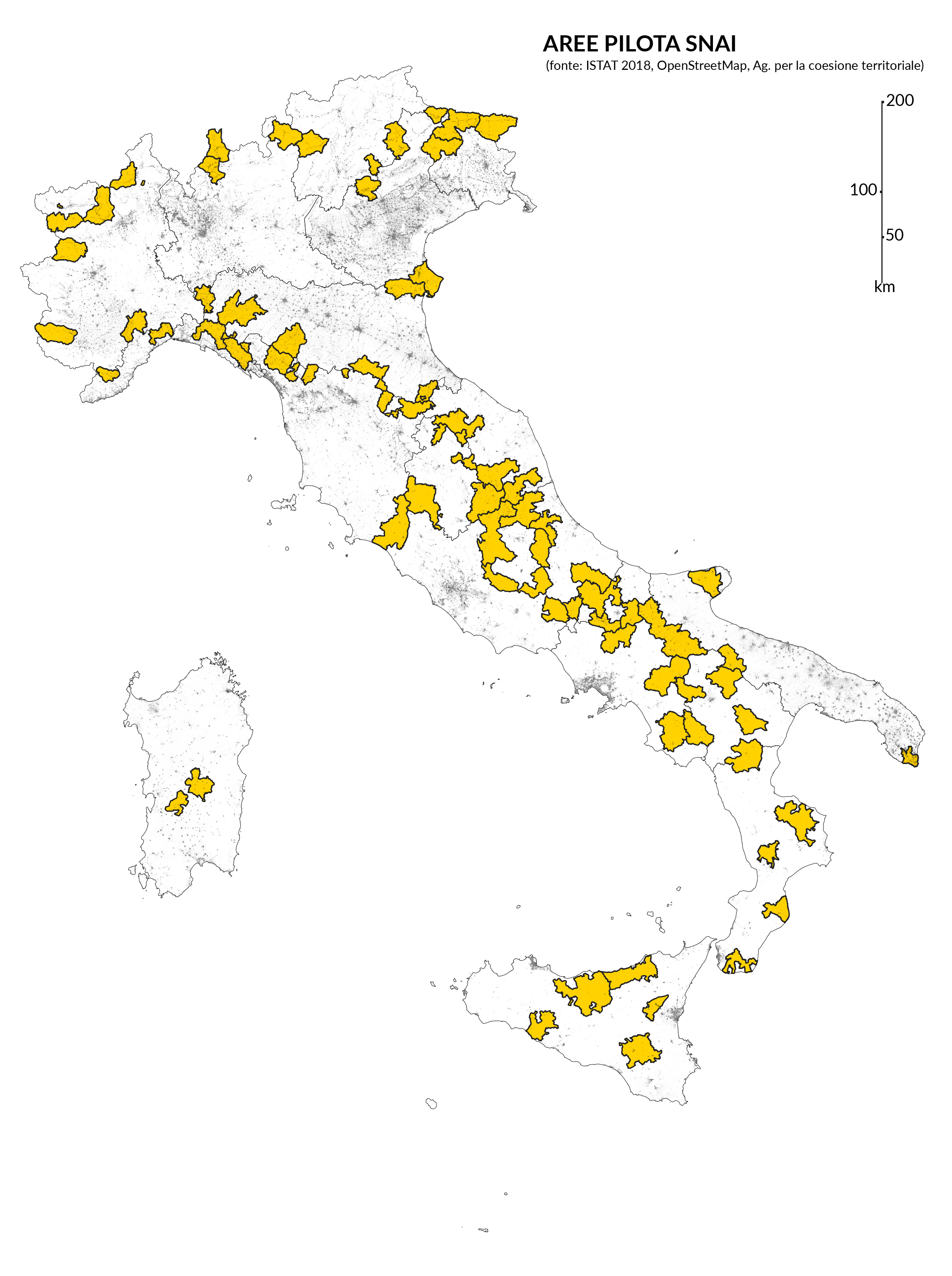
Map of the experimental areas - source: ISTAT, OpenStreetMap, Agenzia per la coesione territoriale.

== SNAI in action ==
In order to apply for the funds, pilot areas were asked to present an interventions and management program where resources should be shared and managed with other municipalities. This associative requirement, managed in agreement with the Department of the Civil Service, was considered by SNAI a preferential requirement as it is considered as a necessary factor to avoid the resources dispersion of and to promote the formation of common governance processes.

The amount of applications and interventions in 71 experimental areas (out of the 72 foreen by the end of 2020) cover different fields: mobility, health, school, public administration efficiency and accountability, natural resources, cultural heritage and sustainable tourism, agriculture, renewable energies, entrepreneurship, digital and physical infrastructures, jobs and training, territorial management. In 2020 the total value of the approved strategies was 1,142 million euro, 261 million from national funds, 693 million from European funds (European Regional Development Fund, European Social Fund+, European Agricultural Fund for Rural Development, and FEAMP), and 189 million from other public and private investments. SNAI expects a 1 to 4 investment leverage according to the Stability and Growth Pact

=== Future integrations ===
During 2020 SNAI additionally allocated 300 million € from national funds in order to help the ongoing best practices and to identify 2 new experimental areas per region by the end of the year. Finally, the Italian government allocated 2,1 billion € to SNAI projects from the Next Generation EU funds for the period 2021–2027.
