= 2020 International GT Open =

The 2020 International GT Open is the fifteenth season of the International GT Open, the grand tourer-style sports car racing series founded in 2006 by the Spanish GT Sport Organización. It began on 8 August at the Hungaroring and ended at the Circuit de Barcelona-Catalunya on 1 November after six rounds.

== Entry list ==
Team	Car	No.	Drivers	Class	Rounds
(Slovakia) ARC Bratislava-SK	Lamborghini Huracán GT3 Evo	4	(Slovakia) Miro Konôpka	Am	1
(Slovakia) ARC Bratislava-SK	Lamborghini Huracán GT3 Evo	4	(Slovakia) Zdeno Mikulasko	Am	1
(Belgium) Boutsen Ginion	Lamborghini Huracán GT3 Evo	4	(France) Claude-Yves Gosselin (Note: Drivers who started their first race of the season at the final round are ineligible for points and invisible as far as awarding points to other drivers".)	Am	6
(Belgium) Boutsen Ginion	Lamborghini Huracán GT3 Evo	4	(France) Marc Rostan	Am	6
(Poland) Olimp Racing	Mercedes-AMG GT3 Evo	5	(Poland) Stanislaw Jedlinski	PA	1
(Poland) Olimp Racing	Mercedes-AMG GT3 Evo	77	(Poland) Marcin Jedlinski	PA	1
(Poland) Olimp Racing	Mercedes-AMG GT3 Evo	77	(Poland) Mateusz Lisowski	PA	1
(United Kingdom) Optimum Motorsport	McLaren 720S GT3	7	(United States) Brendan Iribe	PA	All
(United Kingdom) Optimum Motorsport	McLaren 720S GT3	7	(United Kingdom) Ollie Millroy	PA	All
(United Kingdom) Optimum Motorsport	McLaren 720S GT3	72	(United Kingdom) Nick Moss	PA	All
(United Kingdom) Optimum Motorsport	McLaren 720S GT3	72	(United Kingdom) James Pickford	PA	1
(United Kingdom) Optimum Motorsport	McLaren 720S GT3	72	(United Kingdom) Joe Osborne	PA	2–6
(Germany) GetSpeed Performance	Mercedes-AMG GT3 Evo	11	(Germany) Fabian Schiller	PA	1
(Germany) GetSpeed Performance	Mercedes-AMG GT3 Evo	11	(Germany) "Max"	PA	1
(Germany) GetSpeed Performance	Mercedes-AMG GT3; Mercedes-AMG GT3 Evo	44	(Germany) Jens Liebhauser	Am	1–5
(Germany) GetSpeed Performance	Mercedes-AMG GT3; Mercedes-AMG GT3 Evo	44	(Germany) Florian Scholze	Am	1–5
(San Marino) AKM Motorsport	Mercedes-AMG GT3 Evo	13	(Russia) Alexander Moiseev	Am	1–5
(San Marino) AKM Motorsport	Mercedes-AMG GT3 Evo	13	(Russia) Alexey Nesov	Am	1–5
(San Marino) AKM Motorsport	Mercedes-AMG GT3 Evo	99	(Italy) Lorenzo Ferrari	PA	2
(San Marino) AKM Motorsport	Mercedes-AMG GT3 Evo	99	(Italy) Marco Antonelli	PA	2
(Spain) Teo Martín Motorsport	McLaren 720S GT3	16	(Brazil) Marcelo Hahn	PA	All
(Spain) Teo Martín Motorsport	McLaren 720S GT3	16	(Brazil) Allam Khodair	PA	1, 4, 6
(Spain) Teo Martín Motorsport	McLaren 720S GT3	16	(Brazil) Christian Hahn	PA	2
(Spain) Teo Martín Motorsport	McLaren 720S GT3	16	(Spain) Fran Rueda	PA	3, 5
(Spain) Teo Martín Motorsport	McLaren 720S GT3	57	(Brazil) Christian Hahn	P	4
(Spain) Teo Martín Motorsport	McLaren 720S GT3	57	(Israel) Bar Baruch	P	4
(Spain) Teo Martín Motorsport	McLaren 720S GT3	59	(Portugal) Henrique Chaves	P	All
(Spain) Teo Martín Motorsport	McLaren 720S GT3	59	(Portugal) Miguel Ramos	P	All
(Italy) AF Corse/APM Monaco	Ferrari 488 GT3 Evo 2020	17	(Monaco) Vincent Abril	P	All
(Italy) AF Corse/APM Monaco	Ferrari 488 GT3 Evo 2020	17	(Monaco) Louis Prette	P	All
(Italy) AF Corse/APM Monaco	Ferrari 488 GT3	48	(Italy) Angelo Negro	Am	1
(Italy) AF Corse/APM Monaco	Ferrari 488 GT3	48	(Monaco) Philippe Prette	Am	1
(Italy) AF Corse/APM Monaco	Ferrari 488 GT3	48	(Italy) Angelo Negro	PA	2–6
(Italy) AF Corse/APM Monaco	Ferrari 488 GT3	48	(Monaco) Stéphane Ortelli	PA	2–6
(Germany) SPS Automotive Performance	Mercedes-AMG GT3 Evo	20	(Germany) Valentin Pierburg	Am	2
(Germany) SPS Automotive Performance	Mercedes-AMG GT3 Evo	20	(Germany) Christian Hook	Am	2
(Germany) SPS Automotive Performance	Mercedes-AMG GT3 Evo	20	(Germany) Valentin Pierburg	PA	5
(Germany) SPS Automotive Performance	Mercedes-AMG GT3 Evo	20	(Australia) Nick Foster	PA	5
(Germany) SPS Automotive Performance	Mercedes-AMG GT3 Evo	40	(Germany) Christian Hook	Am	3
(Germany) SPS Automotive Performance	Mercedes-AMG GT3 Evo	40	(Germany) Manuel Lauck	Am	3
(Switzerland) PZ Oberer Zürichsee by TFT	Porsche 911 GT3 R	22	(Switzerland) Niki Leutwiler	Am	1–3, 5
(Germany) Reiter Engineering (Note: As the KTM X-BOW GTX Concept is not a homologated GT3 car, the Reiter Engineering #24 is a guest entry and not eligible to score points.)	KTM X-Bow GTX Concept	24	(Switzerland) Patric Niederhauser	P	3
(Germany) Reiter Engineering	KTM X-Bow GTX Concept	24	(Slovakia) Štefan Rosina	P	3
(Italy) RS Racing	Ferrari 488 GT3	25	(Italy) Daniele Di Amato	PA	4
(Italy) RS Racing	Ferrari 488 GT3	25	(Italy) Alessandro Vezzoni	PA	4
(Italy) Lazarus Racing (Note: Cars No. 26 and 28 entered as Lazarus Racing at round 1 and entered as Team Lazarus for the rest of the season.) (Italy) Team Lazarus	Bentley Continental GT3	26	(Italy) Fabrizio Crestani	P	1–2, 4–6
(Italy) Lazarus Racing (Italy) Team Lazarus	Bentley Continental GT3	26	(Switzerland) Yannick Mettler	P	1–2, 4–6
(Italy) Lazarus Racing (Italy) Team Lazarus	Bentley Continental GT3	28	(Monaco) Stefano Coletti	P	1–2, 4–5
(Italy) Lazarus Racing (Italy) Team Lazarus	Bentley Continental GT3	28	(Romania) Petru Umbrărescu	P	1–2
(Italy) Lazarus Racing (Italy) Team Lazarus	Bentley Continental GT3	28	(Argentina) Nicolás Varrone	P	4–5
(Austria) Lechner Racing	Mercedes-AMG GT3	27	(Germany) Thomas Jäger	PA	3
(Austria) Lechner Racing	Mercedes-AMG GT3	27	(Austria) Mario Plachutta	PA	3
(Denmark) RENO Racing	Honda NSX GT3 Evo	33	(Denmark) Jens Reno Møller	PA	6
(Denmark) RENO Racing	Honda NSX GT3 Evo	33	(Republic of Ireland) Reece Barr	PA	6
(United Kingdom) TF Sport (Note: Car No. 34 entered as TF Sport under a British flag and car No. 97 entered as Oman Racing Team by TF Sport under an Omani flag.); Oman Racing Team by TF Sport	Aston Martin Vantage AMR GT3	34	(Republic of Ireland) Charlie Eastwood	P	All
(United Kingdom) TF Sport; Oman Racing Team by TF Sport	Aston Martin Vantage AMR GT3	34	(Turkey) Salih Yoluc	P	All
(United Kingdom) TF Sport; Oman Racing Team by TF Sport	Aston Martin Vantage AMR GT3	97	(Oman) Ahmad Al Harthy	PA	5
(United Kingdom) TF Sport; Oman Racing Team by TF Sport	Aston Martin Vantage AMR GT3	97	(United Kingdom) Tom Canning	PA	5
(Germany) HTP-Winward Motorsport	Mercedes-AMG GT3 Evo	47	(Germany) Nico Bastian	PA	1
(Germany) HTP-Winward Motorsport	Mercedes-AMG GT3 Evo	47	(Germany) Markus Sattler	PA	1
(France) AKKA ASP	Mercedes-AMG GT3 Evo	61	(Italy) Mario Ricci	Am	6
(France) AKKA ASP	Mercedes-AMG GT3 Evo	61	(France) Jérôme Policand	Am	6
(United Kingdom) RAM Racing	Mercedes-AMG GT3 Evo	69	(United Kingdom) Sam De Haan	PA	3
(United Kingdom) RAM Racing	Mercedes-AMG GT3 Evo	69	(United Kingdom) Callum MacLeod	PA	3
(Poland) JP Motorsport	Mercedes-AMG GT3	88	(Austria) Christian Klien	PA	All
(Poland) JP Motorsport	Mercedes-AMG GT3	88	(Poland) Patryk Krupiński	PA	All
GT Cup Open Europe entries ineligible to score points
Team	Car	No.	Drivers	Class	Rounds
(Spain) Baporo Motorsport	Audi R8 LMS GT4 Evo	10	(Spain) Daniel Díaz-Varela	Cup	4–6
(Spain) Baporo Motorsport	Audi R8 LMS GT4 Evo	10	(Andorra) Manuel Cerqueda	Cup	4–6
(Spain) NM Racing Team	Mercedes-AMG GT4	15	(Spain) Rafael Villanueva	Cup	5–6
(Spain) NM Racing Team	Mercedes-AMG GT4	15	(Spain) Alberto de Martín	Cup	5–6
(Spain) NM Racing Team	Transam Euro (Ford Mustang)	126	(Spain) Albert Estragués	Cup	6
(Germany) PROsport Racing	Aston Martin Vantage AMR GT4	19	(Belgium) Rodrigue Gillion (Note: For Race 1 at Spa, Rodrigue Gillion raced solo. For Race 2 he shared the car with Nico Verdonck.)	Cup	5
(Germany) PROsport Racing	Aston Martin Vantage AMR GT4	19	(Belgium) Nico Verdonck	Cup	5
(Italy) Ombra Racing	Porsche 991 GT3 Cup	51	(Italy) Aldo Festante	Cup	4–6
(Portugal) Sports and you	Mercedes-AMG GT4	60	(Portugal) Antonio Coimbra	Cup	4–5
(Portugal) Sports and you	Mercedes-AMG GT4	60	(Portugal) Luis SIlva	Cup	4–5

Icon	Class
P	Pro Cup
PA	Pro-Am Cup
Am	Am Cup

== Race calendar and results ==
- A seven-round provisional calendar was revealed on 22 October 2019. The schedule will feature six circuits from the 2019 calendar, with Silverstone dropped in favor of the Hungaroring. The schedule also switches the order of some rounds with the Spa round now occurring before the Hockenheimring and the season finale occurring at Catalunya rather than Monza. On 19 March 2020, it was announced that the season opening round at Le Castellet would be moved to 20-23 August in response to the coronavirus outbreak. On 6 April, 2020, it was announced that the Spa round would be postponed to a later date as well. The Barcelona round was also moved in response to avoid having races on consecutive weekends. A provisional calendar was released on 19 May 2020 and involved dropping to a six round season instead of the planned seven due to the cancellation of the Hockenheim round because of track conflicts. The only change made afterwards to this calendar was to move the Hungaroring round to a new date.

Round		Circuit	Date	Pole position	Pro Winner	Pro-Am Winner	Am Winner
1	R1	(Hungary) Hungaroring	8 August	(Poland) No. 88 JP Motorsport	(Spain) No. 59 Teo Martín Motorsport	(Poland) No. 88 JP Motorsport	(Germany) No. 44 GetSpeed Performance
1	R1	(Hungary) Hungaroring	8 August	(Austria) Christian Klien (Poland) Patryk Krupiński	(Portugal) Henrique Chaves (Portugal) Miguel Ramos	(Austria) Christian Klien (Poland) Patryk Krupiński	(Germany) Jens Liebhauser (Germany) Florian Scholze
1	R2	(Hungary) Hungaroring	9 August	(Spain) No. 16 Teo Martín Motorsport	(Italy) No. 17 AF Corse/APM Monaco	(Germany) No. 11 GetSpeed Performance	(Germany) No. 44 GetSpeed Performance
1	R2	(Hungary) Hungaroring	9 August	(Brazil) Allam Khodair (Brazil) Marcelo Hahn	(Monaco) Vincent Abril (Monaco) Louis Prette	(Germany) Fabian Schiller (Germany) "Max"	(Germany) Jens Liebhauser (Germany) Florian Scholze
2	R1	(France) Circuit Paul Ricard, Le Castellet	22 August	(United Kingdom) No. 34 TF Sport	(United Kingdom) No. 34 TF Sport	(United Kingdom) No. 72 Optimum Motorsport	(Germany) No. 44 GetSpeed Performance
2	R1	(France) Circuit Paul Ricard, Le Castellet	22 August	(Republic of Ireland) Charlie Eastwood (Turkey) Salih Yoluc	(Republic of Ireland) Charlie Eastwood (Turkey) Salih Yoluc	(United Kingdom) Nick Moss (United Kingdom) Joe Osborne	(Germany) Jens Liebhauser (Germany) Florian Scholze
2	R2	(France) Circuit Paul Ricard, Le Castellet	23 August	(Italy) No. 17 AF Corse/APM Monaco	(Italy) No. 17 AF Corse/APM Monaco	(Poland) No. 88 JP Motorsport	(Germany) No. 20 SPS Automotive Performance
2	R2	(France) Circuit Paul Ricard, Le Castellet	23 August	(Monaco) Vincent Abril (Monaco) Louis Prette	(Monaco) Vincent Abril (Monaco) Louis Prette	(Austria) Christian Klien (Poland) Patryk Krupiński	(Germany) Valentin Pierburg (Germany) Christian Hook
3	R1	(Austria) Red Bull Ring	12 September	(Spain) No. 16 Teo Martín Motorsport	(Spain) No. 59 Teo Martín Motorsport (Note: The #24 Reiter Engineering entry took the checkered flag first, but was disqualified for a technical infringement)	(Spain) No. 16 Teo Martín Motorsport	(Germany) No. 44 GetSpeed Performance
3	R1	(Austria) Red Bull Ring	12 September	(Spain) Fran Rueda (Brazil) Marcelo Hahn	(Portugal) Henrique Chaves (Portugal) Miguel Ramos	(Spain) Fran Rueda (Brazil) Marcelo Hahn	(Germany) Jens Liebhauser (Germany) Florian Scholze
3	R2	(Austria) Red Bull Ring	13 September	(United Kingdom) No. 34 TF Sport	(United Kingdom) No. 34 TF Sport	(Poland) No. 88 JP Motorsport	(San Marino) No. 13 AKM Motorsport
3	R2	(Austria) Red Bull Ring	13 September	(Republic of Ireland) Charlie Eastwood (Turkey) Salih Yoluc	(Republic of Ireland) Charlie Eastwood (Turkey) Salih Yoluc	(Austria) Christian Klien (Poland) Patryk Krupiński	(Russia) Alexander Moiseev (Russia) Alexey Nesov
4	R1	(Italy) Autodromo Nazionale Monza	26 September	(Italy) No. 26 Team Lazarus	(Italy) No. 26 Team Lazarus	(United Kingdom) No. 72 Optimum Motorsport	(San Marino) No. 13 AKM Motorsport
4	R1	(Italy) Autodromo Nazionale Monza	26 September	(Italy) Fabrizio Crestani (Switzerland) Yannick Mettler	(Italy) Fabrizio Crestani (Switzerland) Yannick Mettler	(United Kingdom) Nick Moss (United Kingdom) Joe Osborne	(Russia) Alexander Moiseev (Russia) Alexey Nesov
4	R2	(Italy) Autodromo Nazionale Monza	27 September	(Spain) No. 59 Teo Martín Motorsport	(Italy) No. 17 AF Corse/APM Monaco	(Spain) No. 16 Teo Martín Motorsport	(Germany) No. 44 GetSpeed Performance
4	R2	(Italy) Autodromo Nazionale Monza	27 September	(Portugal) Henrique Chaves (Portugal) Miguel Ramos	(Monaco) Vincent Abril (Monaco) Louis Prette	(Brazil) Allam Khodair (Brazil) Marcelo Hahn	(Germany) Jens Liebhauser (Germany) Florian Scholze
5	R1	(Belgium) Circuit de Spa-Francorchamps	17 October	(Italy) No. 26 Team Lazarus	(Italy) No. 17 AF Corse/APM Monaco	No. 97 Oman Racing Team by TF Sport	(Germany) No. 44 GetSpeed Performance
5	R1	(Belgium) Circuit de Spa-Francorchamps	17 October	(Italy) Fabrizio Crestani (Switzerland) Yannick Mettler	(Monaco) Vincent Abril (Monaco) Louis Prette	(Oman) Ahmad Al Harthy (United Kingdom) Tom Canning	(Germany) Jens Liebhauser (Germany) Florian Scholze
5	R2	(Belgium) Circuit de Spa-Francorchamps	18 October	(Italy) No. 17 AF Corse/APM Monaco	(Spain) No. 59 Teo Martín Motorsport	(United Kingdom) No. 72 Optimum Motorsport	(Germany) No. 44 GetSpeed Performance
5	R2	(Belgium) Circuit de Spa-Francorchamps	18 October	(Monaco) Vincent Abril (Monaco) Louis Prette	(Portugal) Henrique Chaves (Portugal) Miguel Ramos	(United Kingdom) Nick Moss (United Kingdom) Joe Osborne	(Germany) Jens Liebhauser (Germany) Florian Scholze
6	R1	(Spain) Circuit de Barcelona-Catalunya	31 October	(United Kingdom) No. 34 TF Sport	(Italy) No. 17 AF Corse/APM Monaco	(United Kingdom) No. 72 Optimum Motorsport	(France) No. 61 AKKA ASP
6	R1	(Spain) Circuit de Barcelona-Catalunya	31 October	(Republic of Ireland) Charlie Eastwood (Turkey) Salih Yoluc	(Monaco) Vincent Abril (Monaco) Louis Prette	(United Kingdom) Nick Moss (United Kingdom) Joe Osborne	(Italy) Mario Ricci (France) Jérôme Policand
6	R2	(Spain) Circuit de Barcelona-Catalunya	1 November	(Italy) No. 17 AF Corse/APM Monaco	(United Kingdom) No. 34 TF Sport	(Poland) No. 88 JP Motorsport	(France) No. 61 AKKA ASP
6	R2	(Spain) Circuit de Barcelona-Catalunya	1 November	(Monaco) Vincent Abril (Monaco) Louis Prette	(Republic of Ireland) Charlie Eastwood (Turkey) Salih Yoluc	(Austria) Christian Klien (Poland) Patryk Krupiński	(Italy) Mario Ricci (France) Jérôme Policand

== Championship standings ==
=== Points systems ===
Points are awarded to the top 10 (Pro) or top 6 (Am, Pro-Am, Teams) classified finishers. If less than 6 participants start the race or if less than 75% of the original race distance is completed, half points are awarded. At the end of the season, the lowest race score is dropped; however, the dropped race cannot be the result of a disqualification or race ban.

==== Overall ====
Position	1st	2nd	3rd	4th	5th	6th	7th	8th	9th	10th
Points	15	12	10	8	6	5	4	3	2	1

==== Pro-Am, Am, and Teams ====
Position	1st	2nd	3rd	4th	5th	6th
Points	10	8	6	4	3	2

=== Drivers' championships ===
==== Overall ====
Pos.	Driver	Team	HUN (Hungary)		LEC (France)		RBR (Austria)		MNZ (Italy)		SPA (Belgium)		CAT (Spain)		Points
1	(Portugal) Henrique Chaves (Portugal) Miguel Ramos	(Spain) Teo Martín Motorsport	2	4	3	2	1	4	4	2	4	1	6	10	114
2	(Republic of Ireland) Charlie Eastwood (Turkey) Salih Yoluc	(United Kingdom) TF Sport	6	3	1	3	9	1	2	10	5	2	3	1	112
3	(Monaco) Vincent Abril (Monaco) Louis Prette	(Italy) AF Corse/APM Monaco	Ret	1	4	1	4	2	7	1	1	4	4	12	110
4	(Italy) Fabrizio Crestani (Switzerland) Yannick Mettler	(Italy) Lazarus Racing	4	7											80
4	(Italy) Fabrizio Crestani (Switzerland) Yannick Mettler	(Italy) Team Lazarus			Ret	4			1	5	2	3	7	2	80
5	(Brazil) Marcelo Hahn	(Spain) Teo Martín Motorsport	3	5	7	11	2	6	5	3	10	9	2	7	73
6	(United Kingdom) Nick Moss	(United Kingdom) Optimum Motorsport	Ret	10	2	6	5	7	3	7	9	5	1	6	71
7	(United Kingdom) Joe Osborne	(United Kingdom) Optimum Motorsport			2	6	5	7	3	7	9	5	1	6	70
8	(Austria) Christian Klien (Poland) Patryk Krupiński	(Poland) JP Motorsport	1	9	6	5	12	3	10	4	8	7	9	3	68
9	(Brazil) Allam Khodair	(Spain) Teo Martín Motorsport	3	5					5	3			2	7	49
10	(United States) Brendan Iribe (United Kingdom) Ollie Millroy	(United Kingdom) Optimum Motorsport	5	11	5	7	6	14	8	6	6	8	10	4	48
11	(Spain) Fran Rueda	(Spain) Teo Martín Motorsport					2	6			10	9			20
12	(Germany) Jens Liebhauser (Germany) Florian Scholze	(Germany) GetSpeed Performance	8	8	8	Ret	7	10	12	8	12	11			18
13	(Monaco) Stéphane Ortelli	(Italy) AF Corse/APM Monaco			11	9	13	5	11	12	11	Ret	11	8	14
13	(Italy) Angelo Negro	(Italy) AF Corse/APM Monaco	13	15	11	9	13	5	11	12	11	Ret	11	8	14
14	(Russia) Alexander Moiseev (Russia) Alexey Nesov	(San Marino) AKM Motorsport	11	14	9	10	8	8	9	9	WD	WD			13
15	(Germany) Fabian Schiller (Germany) "Max"	(Germany) GetSpeed Performance	10	2											13
16	(Germany) Valentin Pierburg	(Germany) SPS Automotive Performance			12	8					7	6			12
17	(Oman) Ahmad Al Harthy (United Kingdom) Tom Canning	Oman Racing Team by TF Sport									3	10			11
18	(United Kingdom) Sam De Haan (United Kingdom) Callum MacLeod	(United Kingdom) RAM Racing					3	13							10
19	(Australia) Nick Foster	(Germany) SPS Automotive Performance									7	6			9
20	(Germany) Nico Bastian (Germany) Markus Sattler	(Germany) HTP-Winward Motorsport	7	6											9
21	(Brazil) Christian Hahn	(Spain) Teo Martín Motorsport			7	11			6	11					9
22	(Israel) Bar Baruch	(Spain) Teo Martín Motorsport							6	11					5
23	(Germany) Christian Hook	(Germany) SPS Automotive Performance			12	8	10	11							5
24	(Switzerland) Niki Leutwiler	(Switzerland) PZ Oberer Zürichsee by TFT	9	12	10	12	14	12			DNS	DNS			5
25	(Germany) Manuel Lauck	(Germany) SPS Automotive Performance					10	11							2
26	(United Kingdom) James Pickford	(United Kingdom) Optimum Motorsport	Ret	10											1
	(Slovakia) Miro Konôpka (Slovakia) Zdeno Mikulasko	(Slovakia) ARC Bratislava-SK	12	13											0
	(Monaco) Philippe Prette	(Italy) AF Corse/APM Monaco	13	15											0
	(Italy) Daniele Di Amato (Italy) Alessandro Vezzoni	(Italy) RS Racing							13	Ret					0
	(Poland) Stanislaw Jedlinski (Poland) Mateusz Lisowski	(Poland) Olimp Racing	14	DNS											0
	(Monaco) Stefano Coletti	(Italy) Lazarus Racing	Ret	DNS											0
	(Monaco) Stefano Coletti	(Italy) Team Lazarus			Ret	Ret			Ret	DNS	WD	WD			0
	(Romania) Petru Umbrărescu	(Italy) Lazarus Racing	Ret	DNS											0
	(Romania) Petru Umbrărescu	(Italy) Team Lazarus			Ret	Ret									0
	(Argentina) Nicolás Varrone	(Italy) Team Lazarus							Ret	DNS	WD	WD			0
	(Poland) Marcin Jedlinski	(Poland) Olimp Racing	WD	WD											0
	(Germany) Thomas Jäger (Austria) Mario Plachutta	(Austria) Lechner Racing					DNS	DNS							0
Drivers ineligible to score points
	(Denmark) Jens Reno Møller (Republic of Ireland) Reece Barr	(Denmark) RENO Racing											5	5	
	(Italy) Mario Ricci (France) Jérôme Policand	(France) AKKA ASP											8	9	
	(Switzerland) Patric Niederhauser (Slovakia) Štefan Rosina	(Germany) Reiter Engineering					DSQ	9							
	(France) Marc Rostan (France) Claude-Yves Gosselin	(Belgium) Boutsen Ginion											14	11	
	(Italy) Aldo Festante	(Italy) Ombra Racing							14	13	13	12	12	13	
	(Andorra) Manuel Cerqueda (Spain) Daniel Díaz-Varela	(Spain) Baporo Motorsport							15	14	14	13	13	14	
	(Portugal) Luis Silva (Portugal) Antonio Coimbra	(Portugal) Sports and you							16	15	15	16			
	(Spain) Rafael Villanueva (Spain) Alberto de Martín	(Spain) NM Racing Team									Ret	15	15	15	
	(Belgium) Rodrigue Gillion	(Germany) PROsport Racing									16	DSQ			
	(Spain) Albert Estragués	(Spain) NM Racing Team											Ret	Ret	
	(Belgium) Nico Verdonck	(Germany) PROsport Racing										DSQ			
Pos.	Driver	Team	HUN (Hungary)		LEC (France)		RBR (Austria)		MNZ (Italy)		SPA (Belgium)		CAT (Spain)		Points

==== Pro-Am ====
Pos.	Driver	Team	HUN (Hungary)		LEC (France)		RBR (Austria)		MNZ (Italy)		SPA (Belgium)		CAT (Spain)		Points
1	(Brazil) Marcelo Hahn	(Spain) Teo Martín Motorsport	2	2	4	5	1	3	2	1	6	5	2	5	63
2	(Austria) Christian Klien (Poland) Patryk Krupiński	(Poland) JP Motorsport	1	4	3	1	5	1	4	2	4	3	4	1	62
3	(United Kingdom) Nick Moss	(United Kingdom) Optimum Motorsport	Ret	5	1	2	3	4	1	4	5	1	1	4	57
4	(United Kingdom) Joe Osborne	(United Kingdom) Optimum Motorsport			1	2	3	4	1	4	5	1	1	4	54
5	(United States) Brendan Iribe (United Kingdom) Ollie Millroy	(United Kingdom) Optimum Motorsport	3	6	2	3	4	6	3	3	3	4	5	2	49
4	(Brazil) Allam Khodair	(Spain) Teo Martín Motorsport	2	2					2	1			2	5	40
7	(Spain) Fran Rueda	(Spain) Teo Martín Motorsport					1	3			6	5			21
8	(Monaco) Stéphane Ortelli (Italy) Angelo Negro	(Italy) AF Corse/APM Monaco			5	4	6	2	5	5	7	Ret	6	6	21
9	(Germany) Valentin Pierburg (Australia) Nick Foster	(Germany) SPS Automotive Performance									2	2			14
10	(Germany) Fabian Schiller (Germany) "Max"	(Germany) GetSpeed Performance	5	1											13
11	(Oman) Ahmad Al Harthy (United Kingdom) Tom Canning	Oman Racing Team by TF Sport									1	6			12
12	(United Kingdom) Sam De Haan (United Kingdom) Callum MacLeod	(United Kingdom) RAM Racing					2	5							11
13	(Germany) Nico Bastian (Germany) Markus Sattler	(Germany) HTP-Winward Motorsport	4	3											10
14	(Brazil) Christian Hahn	(Spain) Teo Martín Motorsport			4	5									3
15	(United Kingdom) James Pickford	(United Kingdom) Optimum Motorsport	Ret	5											3
16	(Italy) Daniele Di Amato (Italy) Alessandro Vezzoni	(Italy) RS Racing							6	Ret					2
17	(Poland) Stanislaw Jedlinski (Poland) Mateusz Lisowski	(Poland) Olimp Racing	6	DNS											2
	(Poland) Marcin Jedlinski	(Poland) Olimp Racing	WD	WD											0
	(Germany) Thomas Jäger (Austria) Mario Plachutta	(Austria) Lechner Racing					DNS	DNS							0
Drivers ineligible to score points
	(Denmark) Jens Reno Møller (Republic of Ireland) Reece Barr	(Denmark) RENO Racing											3	3	
Pos.	Driver	Team	HUN (Hungary)		LEC (France)		RBR (Austria)		MNZ (Italy)		SPA (Belgium)		CAT (Spain)		Points

==== Am ====
Pos.	Driver	Team	HUN (Hungary)		LEC (France)		RBR (Austria)		MNZ (Italy)		SPA (Belgium)		CAT (Spain)		Points
1	(Germany) Jens Liebhauser (Germany) Florian Scholze	(Germany) GetSpeed Performance	1	1	1	Ret	1	3	2	1	1	1			67
2	(Russia) Alexander Moiseev (Russia) Alexey Nesov	(San Marino) AKM Motorsport	3	4	2	2	2	1	1	2	WD	WD			53
3	(Switzerland) Niki Leutwiler	(Switzerland) PZ Oberer Zürichsee by TFT	2	2	3	3	4	2			DNS	DNS			36
4	(Germany) Christian Hook	(Germany) SPS Automotive Performance			4	1	3	4							26
5	(Germany) Valentin Pierburg	(Germany) SPS Automotive Performance			4	1									14
6	(Germany) Manuel Lauck	(Germany) SPS Automotive Performance					3	4							12
7	(Slovakia) Miro Konôpka (Slovakia) Zdeno Mikulasko	(Slovakia) ARC Bratislava-SK	4	3											10
8	(Monaco) Philippe Prette (Italy) Angelo Negro	(Italy) AF Corse/APM Monaco	5	5											6
Drivers ineligible to score points
	(Italy) Mario Ricci (France) Jérôme Policand	(France) AKKA ASP											1	1	
	(France) Marc Rostan (France) Claude-Yves Gosselin	(Belgium) Boutsen Ginion											2	1	
Pos.	Driver	Team	HUN (Hungary)		LEC (France)		RBR (Austria)		MNZ (Italy)		SPA (Belgium)		CAT (Spain)		Points

=== Teams' championship ===
Only the highest two finishing cars from a team count towards the Teams' Championship

Pos.	Team	Manufacturer	Points
1	(Spain) Teo Martín Motorsport	McLaren	105
2	(United Kingdom) TF Sport	Aston Martin	69
3	(Italy) AF Corse/APM Monaco	Ferrari	67
4	(United Kingdom) Optimum Motorsport	McLaren	51
5	(Italy) Team Lazarus	Bentley	41
6	(Poland) JP Motorsport	Mercedes-AMG	31
7	(Germany) GetSpeed Performance	Mercedes-AMG	8
8	Oman Racing Team by TF Sport	Aston Martin	6
9	(United Kingdom) RAM Racing	Mercedes-AMG	6
10	(Italy) Lazarus Racing	Bentley	4
11	(Germany) SPS Automotive Performance	Mercedes-AMG	2
12	(Germany) HTP-Winward Motorsport	Mercedes-AMG	2
	(San Marino) AKM Motorsport	Mercedes-AMG	0
	(Slovakia) ARC Bratislava-SK	Lamborghini	0
	(Poland) Olimp Racing	Mercedes-AMG	0
	(Switzerland) PZ Oberer Zürichsee by TFT	Porsche	0
	(Italy) RS Racing	Ferrari	0
