= Platania =

Platania Greek: Plataniá
- Comune
- Comune di Platania
- Location within Italy Location within Calabria
- Coordinates: 39°00′20″N 16°19′15″E
- Country: Italy
- Region: Calabria
- Province: Catanzaro
- Frazioni: N/A

Government
  - Mayor: Davide Esposito

Area
  - Total: 24 km^{2} (9.3 sq mi)
- Elevation: 750 m (2,460 ft)

Population (December 31, 2013)
  - Total: 2,232
  - Density: 93/km^{2} (240/sq mi)
- Demonym: Platanesi
- Time zone: UTC+1 (CET)
  - Summer (DST): UTC+2 (CEST)
- Postal code: 88040
- Dialing code: 0968
- Patron saint: St. Michael
- Website: Official website

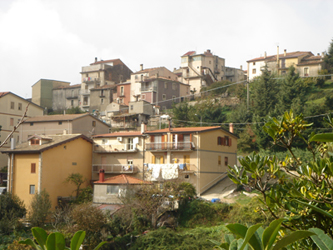
Platania

Platania is a comune and town in the province of Catanzaro in the western part of the Calabria region of Italy. It is located approximately 50 kilometres away from the city of Catanzaro

== Bounding communes ==
- Conflenti
- Decollatura
- Lamezia Terme
- Serrastretta

== Population history ==
Year	Population	Density
1861	2,965	-
1871	3,096	-
1881	3,149	-
1901	3,846	-
1911	3,451	-
1921	3,924	-
1931	4,086	-
1936	4,091	-
1951	4,814	-
1961	4,161	-
1971	3,267	-
1981	3,094	129/km^{2}
1991	3,016	126/km^{2}
2001	2,423	101/km^{2}
2004	2,420	101/km^{2}
2014	2,232	93/km^{2}

The population grew until the 1950s except for between the censuses of 1901 and 1911, the comune was to be rocked by emigration as the population fell over half since the 1950s census. There was significant emigration to the US during the latter half of the 20th century, resulting in a declining population
