= Antonio Porchia =

Argentine poet

Antonio Porchia

Antonio Porchia (Italian pronunciation: [ˈpɔrkja]; November 13, 1885 – November 9, 1968) was an Argentine poet.

Porchia was born in Conflenti, Italy, but, after the death of his father in 1900, moved to Argentina.

Porchia wrote a Spanish book entitled Voces ("Voices"), a book of aphorisms. It has since been translated into Italian and into English (by W.S. Merwin, Copper Canyon Press, 2003), French, and German.

Porchia was a cult author for a number of renowned figures of contemporary literature and thought such as André Breton, Jorge Luis Borges, Don Paterson, Roberto Juarroz and Henry Miller, amongst others. Some critics have paralleled his work to Japanese haiku and found many similarities with a number of Zen schools of thought.

== Works ==
- Voces (1943), English translation by W. S. Merwin: Voices, Copper Canyon Press, 2003, ISBN 1-55659-189-6
