= 2019 SMP F4 Championship =

Motor racing competition

The 2019 SMP F4 Championship was the first season of the SMP F4 Championship, following the closure of the preceding F4 North European Zone Championship at the end of 2018. The 7 round-provisional calendar gets all circuits in Russia. The series is situated with Russian Circuit Racing Series. But addition to the calendar was made after the scheduled 7th round in Sochi was cancelled. 7th round rescheduled return in Finland and Formula Academy Finland races at Alastaro, where the grid was joined by the final round of Formula 4 SMP.

== Drivers ==
All cars are run by Russian team SMP Racing. All drivers use the Tatuus-Abarth F4-T014 chassis.

No.	Driver	Round
2	(Russia) Ivan Matveev	3
5	(Russia) Irina Sidorkova	1−2, 4−7
11	(Russia) Aleksandr Vilaev	All
16	(Russia) Nikita Aleksandrov	All
17	(Russia) Pavel Bulantsev	All
20	(Russia) Ivan Nosov	1−2, 4−7
21	(Russia) Artem Lobanenko	1−2, 4−7
33	(Russia) Aleksey Nesov	All
41	(Russia) Aleksandr Vartanyan	3
Foreign drivers not eligible to score points
10	(Finland) Max Salo	All
12	(Finland) Jimi Hannus	2, 7
56	(Finland) Markus Laitala	2, 7
58	(Finland) Elias Seppänen	7
28	(Finland) Virtala Nestori	7

== Calendar ==
1 to 6 rounds scheduled to support 2019 Russian Circuit Racing Series. An addition to the calendar was made after the scheduled 7th round in Sochi was cancelled. 7th round rescheduled return in Finland.

Rnd.		Circuit	Date	Pole position	Fastest lap	Winning driver
1	1	(Russia) Fort Grozny Autodrom, Grozny	21 April	(Russia) Pavel Bulantsev	(Russia) Pavel Bulantsev	(Russia) Pavel Bulantsev
2	2	(Russia) NRING Circuit, Bogorodsk	18 May	(Russia) Artem Lobanenko	(Russia) Artem Lobanenko	(Russia) Artem Lobanenko
2	3	(Russia) NRING Circuit, Bogorodsk	19 May	(Russia) Artem Lobanenko	(Russia) Artem Lobanenko	(Russia) Aleksey Nesov
3	4	(Russia) Smolensk Ring, Smolensk	22 June	(Russia) Pavel Bulantsev	(Russia) Aleksandr Vartanyan	(Russia) Pavel Bulantsev
3	5	(Russia) Smolensk Ring, Smolensk	23 June	(Russia) Pavel Bulantsev	(Russia) Aleksandr Vartanyan	(Russia) Aleksandr Vartanyan
4	6	(Russia) Kazan Ring, Kazan	13 July	(Russia) Artem Lobanenko	(Russia) Artem Lobanenko	(Russia) Artem Lobanenko
4	7	(Russia) Kazan Ring, Kazan	14 July	(Russia) Artem Lobanenko	(Russia) Artem Lobanenko	(Russia) Artem Lobanenko
5	8	(Russia) ADM Raceway, Moscow	3 August	(Russia) Pavel Bulantsev	(Russia) Pavel Bulantsev	(Russia) Pavel Bulantsev
5	9	(Russia) ADM Raceway, Moscow	4 August	(Russia) Pavel Bulantsev	(Russia) Pavel Bulantsev	(Russia) Pavel Bulantsev
6	10	(Russia) Moscow Raceway, Volokolamsk	17 August	(Russia) Pavel Bulantsev	(Russia) Pavel Bulantsev	(Russia) Pavel Bulantsev
6	11	(Russia) Moscow Raceway, Volokolamsk	18 August	(Russia) Pavel Bulantsev	(Russia) Artem Lobanenko	(Russia) Artem Lobanenko
7	12	(Finland) Alastaro Circuit, Loimaa	21 September	(Finland) Markus Laitala	(Finland) Markus Laitala	(Finland) Markus Laitala
7	13	(Finland) Alastaro Circuit, Loimaa	22 September	(Finland) Markus Laitala	(Russia) Nikita Aleksandrov	(Finland) Markus Laitala

== Championship standings ==
Points system

Points are awarded as follows:

Position	1st	2nd	3rd	4th	5th	6th	7th	8th	9th	10th	11th	12th	13th	14th	15th	PP	FL
Points	25	20	16	13	11	10	9	8	7	6	5	4	3	2	1	1	1

=== Drivers standings ===
Pos	Driver	FGA (Russia)	NRG (Russia)		SMO (Russia)		KZR (Russia)		ADM (Russia)		MSC (Russia)		ALA (Finland)		Pts
1	(Russia) Pavel Bulantsev	1	2	Ret	1	2	Ret	2	1	1	1	2	3	3	254
2	(Russia) Artem Lobanenko	7	1	3			1	1	2	5	7	1	2	2	224
3	(Russia) Aleksey Nesov	3	3	1	6	3	2	Ret	3	2	2	3	5	4	204
4	(Russia) Nikita Aleksandrov	5	9	2	4	4	4	5	5	Ret	3	4	6	8	151
5	(Russia) Aleksandr Vilaev	4	8	5	3	6	5	3	6	4	4	5	Ret	6	147
6	(Russia) Irina Sidorkova	Ret	6	6			3	Ret	4	3	Ret	6	9	7	96
7	(Russia) Ivan Nosov	2	4	7			Ret	4	DNS	Ret	5	Ret	4	5	94
8	(Russia) Aleksandr Vartanyan				2	1									47
9	(Russia) Ivan Matveev				5	5									22
Foreign drivers not eligible to score points
–	(Finland) Markus Laitala		7	4									1	1	-
–	(Finland) Jimi Hannus		5	Ret									Ret	10	-
–	(Finland) Max Salo	6	10	8	7	7	6	6	7	6	6	7	8	11	-
–	(Finland) Elias Seppänen												7	9	-
–	(Finland) Nestori Virtala												11	12	-
Pos	Driver	FGA	NRG		SMO		KZR		ADM		MSC		ALA		Pts
