= Alexey Nesov =

Russian racing driver (born 2003)

- Nationality: (Russia) Russian
- Born: 22 September 2003 (age 23) Moscow, Russia
- Categorisation: FIA Silver

Championship titles
- 2024: SMP GT4 Russia

Alexey Nesov (Russian: Алексей Несов; born 22 September 2003) is a Russian racing driver who last competed in GT World Challenge Europe for Tresor Attempto Racing.

== Career ==
Nesov began racing single-seaters in 2019, competing in the SMP Racing centrally-run SMP F4 Championship, taking a lone win at NRING and eight other podiums to finish third in points. Switching to sportscars for the following year, Nesov joined Mercedes-fielding AKM Motorsport to compete in the Am class of International GT Open. Competing in the first four rounds of the season, he took class wins at the Red Bull Ring and Monza, as well as five other podiums to end the year runner-up in the standings.

After not racing for the following two seasons, Nesov joined Madpanda Motorsport to race in the GT World Challenge Europe Endurance Cup. Sharing a Mercedes-AMG GT3 Evo with Magnus Gustavsen and team owner Ezequiel Pérez Companc in the Silver Cup, Nesov scored a lone class podium at Monza, which helped him end the year fifth in points. At the end of the year, Nesov raced in the 2023–24 Asian Le Mans Series for Audi-affiliated Attempto Racing in the GT class, scoring a best result of 14th in race one at Sepang. Later in 2024, Nesov returned to the team to race in the 24 Hours of Spa, which he won in Bronze Cup alongside Max Hofer, Dylan Pereira and Andrey Mukovoz. However, Nesov's main campaign for 2024 was in SMP GT4 Russia, in which he raced for SMP Racing Motor Sharks, winning all but two of the 15 races he contested en route to the title with a race to spare.

At the start of 2025, Nesov joined Porsche customer team Pure Rxcing to race in the Dubai 24 Hour, in which he finished second overall alongside Harry King, Alex Malykhin and Thomas Preining. For the rest of the year, Nesov returned to Tresor Attempto Racing to race in the Bronze Cup of the GT World Challenge Europe Endurance Cup, as well as a one-off appearance in the GT World Challenge Europe Sprint Cup. In Nesov's second full-time season in the series, he took a lone class podium at Barcelona en route to a 20th-place points finish. During 2025, Nesov also competed in selected rounds of International GT Open for Porsche-affiliated Dinamic GT and Car Collection Motorsport, scoring a Pro-Am class podium with the latter in race two at the Red Bull Ring.

In January of the following year, Nesov joined McLaren-affiliated United Autosports to race in the UAE rounds of the 2025–26 Asian Le Mans Series in the GT class, scoring both fastest laps at Abu Dhabi and a best result of sixth in race two. Also during the winter, Nesov returned to Pure Rxcing to compete in the Dubai 24 Hour, finishing sixth overall alongside Malykhin, Michelle Gatting and Max Hofer. For the rest of the year, Nesov remained with the Lithuanian team for a dual campaign in both the GT World Challenge Europe Endurance and Sprint Cups. Between the two campaigns, Nesov found more success in the former, where he took a Silver class win at Le Castellet, before leaving the team mid-season and rejoining Attempto for the Algarve finale in the Bronze class.

== Karting record ==
=== Karting career summary ===
Season	Series	Team	Position
2014	Sodi World Series Finals — Junior Cup		8th
2017	Trofeo Delle Industrie — OK	Team Komarov	8th
2017	WSK Final Cup — OK	Team Komarov	23rd
2018	WSK Super Master Series — OK	Team Komarov	78th
2018	Karting European Championship — OK	Team Komarov; Ward Racing (Note: Nesov raced for Team Komarov in rounds 1, 3 and for Ward Racing in round 4.)	75th
2018	Karting World Championship — OK	Ward Racing	NC

== Racing record ==
=== Racing career summary ===
Season	Series	Team	Races	Wins	Poles	F/Laps	Podiums	Points	Position
2019	SMP F4 Championship	SMP Racing	13	1	0	0	9	204	**3rd**
2020	International GT Open	AKM Motorsport	8	0	0	0	0	13	14th
2020	International GT Open – Am	AKM Motorsport	8	2	2	5	7	53	**2nd**
2023	GT World Challenge Europe Endurance Cup	Madpanda Motorsport	5	0	0	0	0	0	NC
2023	GT World Challenge Europe Endurance Cup – Silver	Madpanda Motorsport	5	0	0	0	1	54	5th
2023–24	Asian Le Mans Series – GT	Attempto Racing	5	0	0	0	0	0	34th
2024	SMP GT4 Russia	SMP Racing Motor Sharks	15	13	2	8	15	464	**1st**
2024	GT World Challenge Europe Endurance Cup	Tresor Attempto Racing	1	0	0	0	0	8	23rd
2024	GT World Challenge Europe Endurance Cup – Bronze	Tresor Attempto Racing	1	1	0	0	1	38	9th
2025	Middle East Trophy – GT3	Pure Rxcing	1	0	0	0	1	34	NC
2025	GT World Challenge Europe Endurance Cup	Tresor Attempto Racing	5	0	0	0	0	0	NC
2025	GT World Challenge Europe Endurance Cup – Bronze	Tresor Attempto Racing	5	0	1	1	1	21	20th
2025	International GT Open	Dinamic GT	2	0	0	0	0	2	41st
2025	International GT Open	Car Collection Motorsport	2	0	0	0	0	2	41st
2025	International GT Open – Pro-Am	Car Collection Motorsport	2	0	0	0	1	9	20th
2025	GT World Challenge Europe Sprint Cup	Tresor Attempto Racing	2	0	0	0	0	0	NC
2025	GT World Challenge Europe Sprint Cup – Silver	Tresor Attempto Racing	2	0	0	0	0	6	13th
2025	SMP GT4 Russia	RScar Motorsport	2	0	0	0	1	0	NC†
2025–26	Asian Le Mans Series – GT	United Autosports	4	0	0	2	0	14	18th
2025–26	24H Series Middle East – GT3	Pure Rxcing	1	0	0	0	0	28	NC
2026	GT World Challenge Europe Endurance Cup	Pure Rxcing	3	0	0	0	0	0	NC
2026	GT World Challenge Europe Endurance Cup	Tresor Attempto Racing	1	0	0	0	0	0	NC
2026	GT World Challenge Europe Endurance Cup – Silver	Pure Rxcing	3	1	0	0	1	37	10th
2026	GT World Challenge Europe Endurance Cup – Bronze	Tresor Attempto Racing	1	0	0	0	0	6	34th
2026	Intercontinental GT Challenge	Pure Rxcing	1	0	0	0	0	0	NC
2026	GT World Challenge Europe Sprint Cup	Pure Rxcing	2	0	0	0	0	0	NC
2026	GT World Challenge Europe Sprint Cup – Silver	Pure Rxcing	2	0	0	1	0	10.5	12th
2026	ADAC GT Masters	Pure Rxcing	1	0	0	0	0	0	NC†
2026	SMP GT4 Russia	RScar Motorsport							

^{†} As Nesov was a guest driver, he was ineligible to score points.

=== Complete SMP F4 Championship results ===
(key) (Races in bold indicate pole position) (Races in italics indicate fastest lap)

Year	Team	1	2	3	4	5	6	7	8	9	10	11	12	13	DC	Points
2019	SMP Racing	FGA; 3	NRG; 1; 3	NRG; 2; 1	SMO; 1; 6	SMO; 2; 3	KZR; 1; 2	KZR; 2 Ret	ADM; 1; 3	ADM; 2; 2	MSC; 1; 2	MSC; 2; 3	ALA; 1; 5	ALA; 2; 4	3rd	204

=== Complete International GT Open results ===
Year	Team	Car	Class	1	2	3	4	5	6	7	8	9	10	11	12	13	14	Pos.	Points
2020	AKM Motorsport	Mercedes-AMG GT3 Evo	Am	HUN; 1; 3	HUN; 2; 4	LEC; 1; 2	LEC; 2; 2	RBR; 1; 2	**RBR**; **2**; 1	MNZ; 1; 1	**MNZ**; **2**; 2	SPA; 1 WD	SPA; 2 WD	CAT; 1	CAT; 2			2nd	53
2025	Dinamic GT	Porsche 911 GT3 R (992)	Pro	ALG; 1; 23	ALG; 2; 11	SPA	HOC; 1	HOC; 2	HUN; 1	HUN; 2	LEC; 1	LEC; 2						41st	2
2025	Car Collection Motorsport	Porsche 911 GT3 R (992)	Pro-Am										RBR; 1; 6	RBR; 2; 3	CAT; 1	CAT; 2	MNZ	20th	9

=== Complete GT World Challenge results ===
==== GT World Challenge Europe Endurance Cup ====
Year	Team	Car	Class	1	2	3	4	5	6	7	Pos.	Points
2023	Madpanda Motorsport	Mercedes-AMG GT3 Evo	Silver	MNZ; 25	LEC; 22	SPA; 6H; 39	SPA; 12H; 54	SPA; 24H; 39	NÜR; 48†	CAT; 46†	5th	54
2024	Tresor Attempto Racing	Audi R8 LMS Evo II	Bronze	LEC	SPA; 6H; 29	SPA; 12H; 3	SPA; 24H; 10	NÜR	MNZ	JED	9th	38
2025	Tresor Attempto Racing	Audi R8 LMS Evo II	Bronze	LEC; 50	MNZ; Ret	SPA; 6H; 51	SPA; 12H; 63†	SPA; 24H; Ret	NÜR; 40	BAR; 15	20th	21
2026	Pure Rxcing	Porsche 911 GT3 R (992.2)	Silver	LEC; 17	MNZ; 37†	SPA; 6H; 31	SPA; 12H; 58†	SPA; 24H; Ret	NÜR		10th	37
2026	Tresor Attempto Racing	Audi R8 LMS Evo II	Bronze							ALG; 36	34th	6

==== GT World Challenge Europe Sprint Cup ====
(key) (Races in bold indicate pole position) (Races in italics indicate fastest lap)

Year	Team	Car	Class	1	2	3	4	5	6	7	8	9	10	Pos.	Points
2025	Tresor Attempto Racing	Audi R8 LMS Evo II	Silver	BRH; 1	BRH; 2	ZAN; 1	ZAN; 2	MIS; 1	MIS; 2	MAG; 1	MAG; 2	VAL; 1 Ret	VAL; 2; 12	13th	6
2026	Pure Rxcing	Porsche 911 GT3 R (992.2)	Silver	BRH; 1; 19	BRH; 2; 21	MIS; 1	MIS; 2	MAG; 1	MAG; 2	ZAN; 1	ZAN; 2	CAT; 1	CAT; 2	12th	10.5

=== Complete Asian Le Mans Series results ===
(key) (Races in bold indicate pole position) (Races in italics indicate fastest lap)

Year	Team	Class	Car	Engine	1	2	3	4	5	6	Pos.	Points
2023–24	Attempto Racing	GT	Audi R8 LMS Evo II	Audi DAR 5.2 L V10	SEP; 1; 14	SEP; 2; 15	DUB; Ret	YMC; 1 Ret	YMC; 2; 16		36th	0
2025–26	United Autosports	GT	McLaren 720S GT3 Evo	McLaren M840T 4.0 L Turbo V8	SEP; 1	SEP; 2	DUB; 1; 16	DUB; 2; 7	ABU; 1; 15	ABU; 2; 6	18th	14
