= Michele Pane =

Michele Pane (Adami of Decollatura, March 11, 1876 – Chicago, April 18, 1953) was an Italian American symbolist poet and journalist who wrote in northern Calabrese.

== Life ==
He was born at (Adami of Decollatura (Calabria, Italy) to a family of middle-class landowners. After the high school studies in Nicastro and Monteleone, two centers rich with humanistic culture, he studied Jurisprudence at the University of Naples, but he interrupted his studies and he did not obtain a degree. His first poem, The Red Man (1898) caused him several disputes and even a trial. In 1899 he emigrated to the United States. In the US he was involved in various activities (wine merchant, Italian teacher, notary, bank clerk, journalist, etc.) He contributed also as a journalist with various literary writings. In 1924 he moved from Brooklyn to Omaha, Nebraska, and then to Chicago, and he remained there for about thirty years. He died in Chicago on April 18, 1953.

== Works ==
- L'uominu russu (The Red Man, Foggia, 1898)
- Trilogia (Trilogy, Nicastro, 1901)
- Viole e ortiche (Violets and Nettles, New York City, 1906)
- Accuordi (Chords, Naples, 1911
- Sorrisi (Smiles, New York City, 1914)
- Lu calavrise ngrisatu (The Americanized Calabrese, New York City, 1916)
- Peccati (Sins, New York City, 1916)
- Musa silvestre (Sylvan Muse, Catanzaro, 1930)
- Garibaldina (New York City, 1949)
