= Reventino =

Mountain in Italy

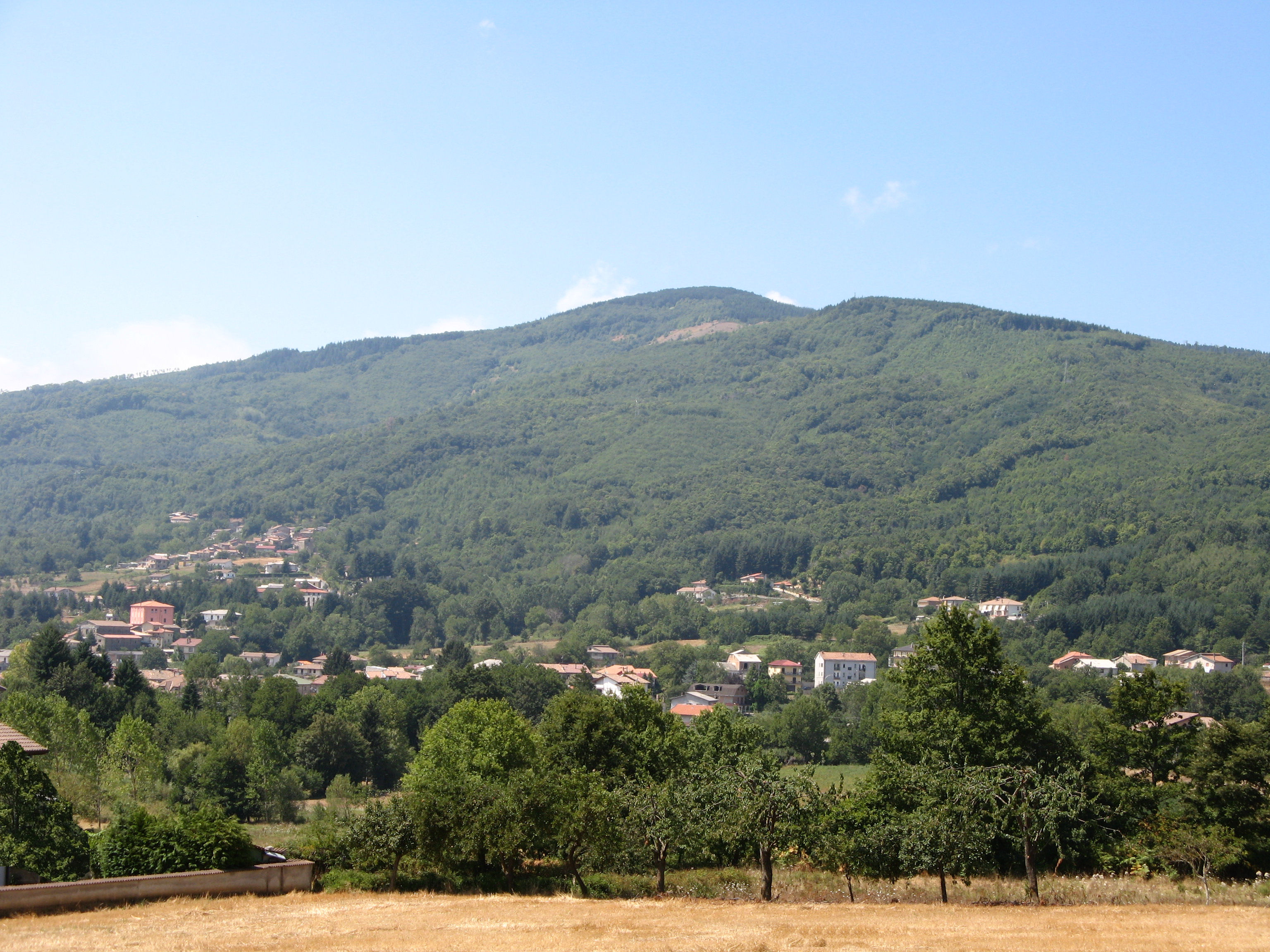
- The Reventino with the town of Decollatura.

Highest point
- Elevation: 1,417 m (4,649 ft)
- Coordinates: 39°04′04″N 16°18′18″E

Geography
- Location within Italy
- Location: Calabria, southern Italy
- Parent range: Calabrian Apennines

Reventino is a massif in the southern Apennines, in Calabria, southern Italy. It has a maximum elevation of 1,417 metres (4,649 ft). It marks the narrowest point of the Italian Peninsula, being at the top of the Isthmus of Catanzaro that separates the Ionian and Tyrrhenian Seas.

The massif is bordered by the Savuto river valley from the north, the Sant'Eufemia Plain southwards, and the Tyrrhenian Sea and the Sila Piccola sub-range. The maximum elevation is included in the territory of Platania

== Sources ==
- Bevilacqua, Francesco (2008). Il Parco del Reventino: guida storico-naturalistica ed escursionistica al gruppo dei monti Mancuso, Reventino, Tiriolo e Gimigliano, Soveria Mannelli. Rubbettino. ISBN 978-88-498-2052-2.
