= 2024 Russian Circuit Racing Series =

Circuit Racing Series

The 2024 SMP Russian Circuit Racing Series is the eleventh season of the Russian Circuit Racing Series, organized by SMP Racing. It's the tenth season with international TCR class cars. In 2023, the competition's held in seventh classes: Touring, Touring Light, Super Production, S1600, GT4, CN and Historic Touring Cup.

== Teams and drivers ==
Yokohama is the official tyre supplier.

=== Touring / TCR Russian Touring Car Championship ===
Team	Car	No.	Drivers	Rounds
(Russia) Lukoil Racing SMP Team	Hyundai i30 N TCR	2	(Russia) Aleksandr Smolyar	All
(Russia) Lukoil Racing SMP Team	Hyundai i30 N TCR	7	(Russia) Kirill Smal	All
(Russia) Lukoil Racing SMP Team	Hyundai Elantra N TCR	10	(Russia) Vladimir Atoev	All
(Russia) TAIF Motorsport	Cupra León VZ TCR	4	(Russia) Dmitry Bragin	All
(Russia) TAIF Motorsport	Cupra León Competición TCR	12	(Russia) Mikhail Simonov	All
(Russia) LADA Sport Rosneft	LADA Vesta NG TCR	8	(Russia) Ivan Chubarov	All
(Russia) LADA Sport Rosneft	LADA Vesta NG TCR	50	(Russia) Maksim Turiev	All
(Russia) Innostage AG Team	Audi RS 3 LMS TCR (2021)	17	(Russia) Pavel Kalmanovich	All
(Russia) Innostage AG Team	Hyundai i30 N TCR	20	(Russia) Egor Sanin	All
(Russia) ALGA Motorsport	Audi RS 3 LMS TCR (2021)	18	(Russia) Rustam Fatkhutdinov	1–2
(Russia) Twins Racing	Audi RS 3 LMS TCR (2021)	78	(Russia) Artem Slutsky	6–8
(Russia) Twins Racing	Hyundai i30 N TCR	78	(Russia) Artem Slutsky	1–4
(Russia) Twins Racing	Hyundai i30 N TCR	98	(Russia) Zakhar Slutsky	All

Key
Teams claimed for team points.

=== Super Production ===
All teams and drivers are Russian-registered.

Team	Car	No.	Drivers	Rounds
(Russia) LADA Sport Rosneft	LADA Vesta NG	11	(Russia) Kirill Ladygin	All
(Russia) LADA Sport Rosneft	LADA Vesta NG	99	(Russia) Leonid Panfilov	All
(Russia) LECAR Racing	LADA Vesta NG	19	(Russia) Vladimir Sheshenin	All
(Russia) LECAR Racing	LADA Vesta NG	29	(Russia) Andrey Petukhov	All
(Russia) Kosarev Artem	Mazda 3	15	(Russia) Artem Kosarev	1–3
(Russia) Sheklachev Eugeny	Mazda 3	49	(Russia) Eugeny Sheklachev	7
(Russia) Sofit Racing Team	Subaru BRZ	21	(Russia) Maksim Arkhangelsky	All
(Russia) Sofit Racing Team	Subaru BRZ	22	(Russia) Artemiy Melnikov	All
(Russia) Sofit Racing Team	Subaru BRZ	97	(Russia) Ivan Ovsienko	All
(Russia) Neva Motorsport	Honda Civic Type R FN2	33	(Russia) Roman Golykov	All
(Russia) Shield Rock	Volkswagen Scirocco	80	(Russia) Aleksandr Garmash	1, 3–4, 6–8
(Russia) RHHCC Lubsar Racing Team	Honda Civic Type R EP3	88	(Russia) Nikolay Vikhansky	1, 3–4, 6–7

Key
Teams claimed for team points.

=== Touring Light ===
All teams and drivers are Russian-registered.

Team	Car	No.	Drivers	Rounds
(Russia) Bragin Racing Team	Skoda Fabia 1.5T	1	(Russia) Mikhail Simonov	5
(Russia) Bragin Racing Team	Skoda Fabia 1.5T	5	(Russia) Maksim Soldatov	All
(Russia) Bragin Racing Team	Skoda Fabia 1.5T	89	(Russia) Artem Fridman	1, 3–7
(Russia) Salnikov Aleksandr	Hyundai Solaris II 1.6T	7	(Russia) Aleksandr Salnikov	7
(Belarus) Savin Aleksey	Hyundai Solaris II 1.6T	66	(Belarus) Aleksey Savin	5–7
(Belarus) Savin Aleksey	Hyundai Solaris	66	(Belarus) Aleksey Savin	1, 3
(Russia) Innostage AG Team	Kia Rio X 1.6T	10	(Russia) Stanislav Novikov	All
(Russia) Innostage AG Team	Kia Rio X 1.5T	78	(Russia) Artem Antonov	1, 3–4
(Russia) Innostage AG Team	Kia Rio X 1.5T	88	(Russia) Ilya Sidorov	All
(Russia) Innostage AG Team	Audi A1 6B 1.4T; Audi A1 6B 1.5T	32	(Russia) Aleksandr Chachava	3–8
(Russia) Rumos Racing	Kia Rio X 1.4T	32	(Russia) Aleksandr Chachava	1
(Russia) Rumos Racing	Kia Rio X 1.5T	22	(Russia) Viktor Sidorkin	8
(Russia) Rumos Racing	Kia Rio X 1.5T	25	(Russia) Daniil Kharashun	All
(Russia) Rumos Racing	Kia Rio X 1.5T	27	(Russia) Roman Scherbakov	3–4, 6–8
(Russia) Rumos Racing	Kia Rio X 1.5T	70	(Russia) Ilya Rodkin	All
(Russia) Rally Academy	Audi A1 8X 1.4T	12	(Russia) Nikolay Karamyshev	All
(Russia) Rally Academy	Audi A1 8X 1.4T	55	(Russia) Petr Plotnikov	All
(Russia) RS Motorsport	Mini JCW F56 1.6T	13	(Russia) Stepan Anufriev	5–7
(Russia) B-Tuning Pro Racing	Volkswagen Polo R2B	16	(Russia) Tatiana Eliseeva	1, 3–4
(Russia) B-Tuning Pro Racing	Mini JCW F56 1.6T	16	(Russia) Tatiana Eliseeva	7–8
(Russia) Kuzma’s Mother RT	Kia Rio X 1.6T	17	(Russia) Vladimir Cherevan	All
(Russia) Kuzma’s Mother RT	Kia Rio X 1.6T	33	(Russia) Dmitry Dudarev	All
(Russia) Lukoil Racing	Audi A1 8X 1.4T	21	(Russia) Daniil Kovalev	1, 3–7
(Russia) Lukoil Racing	Audi A1 8X 1.4T	43	(Russia) Andrey Maslennikov	All
(Russia) ALGA Motorsport	Hyundai Solaris 1.6T	24	(Russia) Kirill Zinoviev	1, 5–8
(Russia) ALGA Motorsport	Volkswagwn Polo 1.4T	24	(Russia) Kirill Zinoviev	3–4
(Russia) Kalimullin Azat	Kia Rio X 1.4T	28	(Russia) Azat Kalimullin	1, 3, 6
(Russia) Powerfuls	Kia Rio X 1.5T	37	(Russia) Denis Karelin	5–7
(Russia) Powerfuls	Volkswagwn Polo 1.4T	37	(Russia) Denis Karelin	1, 3–4
(Russia) Powerfuls	Volkswagwn Polo 1.4T	49	(Russia) Ivan Tverdokhlebov	1, 3–7
(Russia) STK Timerkhan	Volkswagwn Polo 1.4T	62	(Russia) Rais Minnikhanov	5

Key
Teams claimed for team points.

=== S1600 ===
All teams and drivers are Russian-registered.

Team	Car	No.	Drivers	Rounds
(Russia) ALGA Motorsport	Kia Rio	11	(Russia) Dmitry Shishko	1
(Russia) ALGA Motorsport	Hyundai Solaris	23	(Germany) Kai Richard Schick	All
(Russia) ALGA Motorsport	Hyundai Solaris	44	(Russia) Artem Volkov	7
(Russia) ALGA Motorsport	Hyundai Solaris	210	(Russia) Vladimir Lobachev	4–8
(Russia) ALGA Motorsport	LADA Vesta	210	(Russia) Vladimir Lobachev	1, 3
(Russia) ALGA Motorsport	LADA Vesta	67	(Russia) Pavel Sokerkin	5–6
(Russia) RS Motorsport	Hyundai Solaris	13	(Russia) Stepan Anufriev	3–4
(Russia) Bragin Racing Team	LADA Granta	14	(Russia) Nikolay Kalinin	All
(Russia) Grekov Oleg	LADA Kalina	15	(Russia) Yaroslav Grekov	3, 5
(Russia) Rumos Racing	Kia Rio X	22	(Russia) Viktor Sidorkin	4–7
(Russia) Rumos Racing	Kia Rio X	27	(Russia) Roman Scherbakov	1
(Russia) Pochenkov	Kia Rio	54	(Russia) Mikhail Pochenkov	All
(Russia) Pochenkov	Kia Rio	79	(Russia) Aleksandr Pochenkov	All
(Russia) Parus	Kia Rio X	56	(Russia) Vasily Korablev	All
(Russia) GTE Racing Team	Kia Rio X	58	(Russia) Mikhail Dralin	1, 3–4
(Russia) GTE Racing Team	Lada Granta FL	84	(Russia) Philipp Tuponosov	All
(Russia) GTE Racing Team	Lada Granta FL	100	(Russia) Ruslan Safin	5–8
(Russia) Safin Ruslan	Lada Granta FL	100	(Russia) Ruslan Safin	4
(Russia) STK Timerkhan	Kia Rio	62	(Russia) Rais Minnikhanov	4
(Russia) Zinatov Albert	Lada Granta FL	96	(Russia) Albert Zinatov	5
(Russia) GTE Racing Team Prus	Lada Granta FL	96	(Russia) Albert Zinatov	6–8
(Russia) GTE Racing Team Prus	Lada Granta FL	115	(Russia) Konstantin Shitov	6–8

Key
Teams claimed for team points.

=== GT4 ===
All teams and drivers are Russian-registered.

Team	Car	No.	Drivers	Rounds
(Russia) X Motorsport Team Garis	Toyota GR Supra GT4; Toyota GR Supra GT4 Evo	5	(Russia) Sergey Titarenko	All
(Russia) X Motorsport Team Garis	Toyota GR Supra GT4; Toyota GR Supra GT4 Evo	11	(Russia) Dmitry Rodionov	All
(Russia) Rally Academy	Toyota GR Supra GT4 Evo	7	(Russia) Ilya Gorbatsky	6
(Russia) Capital Racing Team	Mercedes-AMG GT4	13	(Russia) Denis Remenyako	All
(Russia) Yadro Motorsport	Toyota GR Supra GT4	16	(Russia) Sergey Stolyarov	8
(Russia) Yadro Motorsport	Mercedes-AMG GT4	16	(Russia) Sergey Stolyarov	1, 3–4, 6–7
(Russia) Yadro Motorsport	Mercedes-AMG GT4	88	(Russia) Rinat Salikhov	3–4, 6–7
(Russia) RScar Motorsport	Mercedes-AMG GT4	24	(Russia) Nikita Silaev	3–4, 6–7
(Russia) RScar Motorsport	Mercedes-AMG GT4	63	(Russia) Vadim Mescheryakov	3–4
(Russia) SMP Racing Motor Sharks	Mercedes-AMG GT4	33	(Russia) Aleksey Nesov	1, 3–4, 6–7
(Russia) Iskra Motorsport	Toyota GR Supra GT4; Toyota GR Supra GT4 Evo	37	(Russia) Andrey Solukovtsev	All
(Russia) Rumos Racing	Toyota GR Supra GT4 Evo	46	(Russia) Svetlana Gorbunova	All
(Russia) Rumos Racing	Toyota GR Supra GT4 Evo	47	(Russia) Lev Tolkachev	All
(Russia) SMP Racing	Mercedes-AMG GT4	51	(Russia) Irina Sidorkova	All
(Russia) Team Garis	Toyota GR Supra GT4	56	(Russia) Dmitry Anastasiadis	1, 3–4, 6–7
(Russia) Team Garis	Toyota GR Supra GT4	65	(Russia) Dionis Anastasiadis	1
(Russia) Team Garis	Toyota GR Supra GT4 Evo	74	(Russia) David Pogosyan	6–7
(Russia) Goncharov Andrey	Toyota GR Supra GT4; Toyota GR Supra GT4 Evo	77	(Russia) Andrey Goncharov	3–4, 6–7

Key
Teams claimed for team points.

=== Sports prototype CN ===
Team	Car	No.	Drivers	Rounds
(Belarus) SDYUSTSH for motorsports	Legends 600	4	(Belarus) Vladimir Gorlach	2, 7
(Belarus) SDYUSTSH for motorsports	Legends 600	5	(Belarus) Sergey Lapitsky	2–3, 5
(Russia) Vrulin Nikolay	527 Shortcut	6	(Russia) Nikolay Vrulin	All
(Russia) Dobrynina Tatiana	527 Shortcut	7	(Russia) Tatiana Dobrynina	2–3, 6–7
(Russia) Viktorov Artem	527 Shortcut	8	(Russia) Artem Viktorov	2, 4–5
(Russia) AIMOL Racing CSKA	527 Shortcut	10	(Russia) Sergey Ievlev	All
(Russia) AIMOL Racing CSKA	527 Shortcut	31	(Russia) Aleksey Khairov	All
(Russia) AIMOL Racing	527 Shortcut	11	(Russia) Aleksey Chernov	All
(Russia) AIMOL Racing	527 Shortcut	18	(Russia) Sergey Peregudov	All
(Russia) Russian Ring	Legends EVO	12	(Kazakhstan) Shota Abkhazava	2, 6–7
(Russia) Russian Ring	Legends EVO	73	(Russia) Sergey Aglish	2
(Russia) Russian Ring	Legends EVO	75	(Kazakhstan) Alexander Abkhazava	6–7
(Russia) Russian Ring	Legends EVO	221	(Russia) Artem Kabakov	2
(Russia) Russian Ring	Legends 600	17	(Russia) Yuriy Ryazantsev	2–3, 5, 7
(Russia) Russian Ring	Legends 600	23	(Russia) Matvey Smirnov	3, 5
(Russia) Russian Ring	Legends 600	46	(Russia) Roman Averyanov	2, 5
(Russia) Russian Ring	Legends 600	58	(Russia) Efim Lev	2–3, 7
(Russia) Russian Ring	Legends 600	82	(Russia) Daniil Zubenkov	2, 7
(Russia) Leontiev Artem	527 Shortcut	13	(Russia) Artem Leontiev	All
(Russia) Team Garis	MitJet 2L	14	(Russia) Petr Biryukov	7
(Russia) Team Garis	MitJet 2L	37	(Russia) Konstantin Zakharevsky	3–4
(Russia) Team Garis	MitJet 2L	45	(Russia) Anton Khrapykin	3–4, 6–7
(Russia) Team Garis	MitJet 2L	49	(Russia) Ivan Tverdokhlebov	7
(Russia) Team Garis	MitJet 2L	111	(Russia) Evgeny Samoilov	5–7
(Russia) Balchug Racing	527 Shortcut	15	(Russia) Boris Shulmeyster	All
(Russia) Balchug Racing	527 Shortcut	21	(Russia) Kirill Kirakozov	All
(Russia) Balchug Racing	527 Shortcut	33	(Russia) Stanislav Sidoruk	All
(Russia) Balchug Racing	527 Shortcut	43	(Russia) Aleksey Didukh	All
(Russia) Balchug Racing	527 Shortcut	93	(Russia) Sergey Valuyskikh	2–4, 6–7
(Russia) Balchug Racing	527 Shortcut	96	(Russia) Dmitry Eliseev	2–4, 6–7
(Russia) Magidovich Eugeny	527 Shortcut	16	(Russia) Eugeny Magidovich	4–7
(Russia) Gromov Andrey	527 Shortcut	19	(Russia) Andrey Gromov	All
(Russia) Kramar Motorsport	527 Shortcut	22	(Russia) Egor Grachev	3–7
(Russia) Kramar Motorsport	527 Shortcut	74	(Russia) Igor Shunailov	All
(Russia) Frolov Nikita	MitJet 2L	24	(Russia) Nikita Frolov	3, 6
(Russia) SMP Racing	MitJet 2L	27	(Russia) Mariya Tyrina	All
(Russia) SMP Racing	MitJet 2L	54	(Russia) Ilya Sidelnikov	3–7
(Russia) SMP Racing	MitJet 2L	222	(Russia) Konstantin Sugrobov	All
(Russia) Vinopal Aleksandr	527 Shortcut	30	(Russia) Aleksandr Vinopal	2–3, 6–7
(Russia) Dudarev Motorsport	527 Shortcut	55	(Russia) Aleksandr Dudarev	All
(Russia) Dudarev Motorsport	527 Shortcut	78	(Russia) Yuriy Sunyaev	2–5, 6–7
(Russia) Maleev Mikhail	527 Shortcut	63	(Russia) Mikhail Maleev	2–4, 6–7
(Russia) Skorik Maksim	527 Shortcut	67	(Russia) Maksim Skorik	6
(Russia) Krumilov Stepan	527 Shortcut	69	(Russia) Stepan Krumilov	2, 5
(Russia) Parshutin Pavel	527 Shortcut	71	(Russia) Pavel Parshutin	All
(Russia) Saitov Damir	527 Shortcut	77	(Russia) Damir Saitov	2–4, 6–7
(Russia) Boyarinova Ekaterina	527 Shortcut	88	(Russia) Ekaterina Boyarinova	All
(Russia) Kharchenko Semyon	MitJet 2L	99	(Russia) Semyon Kharchenko	6–7
(Russia) Shutemov Aleksandr	527 Shortcut	160	(Russia) Aleksandr Shutemov	All
(Russia) Gerasimov Ivan	527 Shortcut	888	(Russia) Ivan Gerasimov	2, 7

=== SMP Historic Touring Cup ===
Team	Car	No.	Drivers	Class	Rounds
(Russia) Khamidullin Almaz	VAZ 21074	10	(Russia) Almaz Khamidullin	HC1600	5–7
(Russia) Sokolkin Oleg	VAZ 2101	16	(Russia) Oleg Sokolkin	HC1600	7
(Russia) Kuzma's Mother Racing Team	VAZ 21013	17	(Russia) Vladimir Cherevan	HC2000	All
(Russia) Mysachev Denis	Moskvich 412	19	(Russia) Denis Mysachev	HC2000	7
(Russia) Moscow Virtuosi	VAZ 2105	26	(Russia) Ivan Tarakanov	HC1600	All
(Russia) Moscow Virtuosi	VAZ 2107	33	(Russia) Andrey Kozlov	HC1600	All
(Russia) Shevel Vladislav	Moskvich 408	43	(Russia) Vladislav Shevel	HC2000	7
(Russia) Khusainov Timur	VAZ 2106	69	(Russia) Timur Khusainov	HC1600	All
(Russia) Donets Vladislav	Moskvich 408IE	77	(Russia) Vladislav Donets	HC2000	All
(Russia) Semenov Gleb	VAZ 2101	80	(Russia) Gleb Semenov	HC2000	2, 5–7
(Russia) Kurushin Maksim	VAZ 21013	83	(Russia) Maksim Kurushin	HC1600	7
(Russia) Bulatov Kirill	VAZ 2102	123	(Russia) Kirill Bulatov	HC1600	5–7
(Russia) Pavluk Sergey	Moskvich 412	500	(Russia) Sergey Pavluk	HC2000	5, 7
(Russia) Milanov Maksim	VAZ 2101	545	(Russia) Maksim Milanov	HC1600	2
(Russia) Smolyakov Roman	VAZ 2101	555	(Russia) Roman Smolyakov	HC1600	2–3, 6–7

== Calendar and results ==
Calendar is presented on October 19 and includes 8 rounds and was adjusted on December 21.

Rnd.	Circuit	Date	Touring winner	SP winner	TL winner	S1600 winner	GT4 winner	CN winners	HTC winners
1	Fort Grozny Autodrom, Grozny	12–14 April	R1: Mikhail Simonov; R2: Dmitry Bragin	R1: Vladimir Sheshenin; R2: Vladimir Sheshenin	R1: Vladimir Cherevan; R2: Daniil Kharashun	R1: Roman Scherbakov; R2: Nikolay Kalinin	R1: Sergey Titarenko; R2: Aleksey Nesov; R3: Aleksey Nesov	not held	not held
2	Smolensk Ring, Smolensk	3–5 May	R1: Vladimir Atoev; R2: Kirill Smal	R1: Kirill Ladygin; R2: Kirill Ladygin	not held	not held	not held	R1: Shortcut: Aleksandr Dudarev; Legends: Shota Abkhazava; Mitjet: Konstantin Sugrobov; R2: Shortcut: Andrey Gromov; Legends: Shota Abkhazava; Mitjet: Konstantin Sugrobov	R1: HC2000: Vladimir Cherevan; HC1600: Andrey Kozlov; R2: HC2000: Vladimir Cherevan; HC1600: Andrey Kozlov
3	NRING Circuit, Bogorodsk	31 May–2 June	R1: Egor Sanin; R2: Zakhar Slutsky	R1: Leonid Panfilov; R2: Vladimir Sheshenin	R1: Andrey Maslennikov; R2: Nikolay Karamyshev	R1: Nikolay Kalinin; R2: Aleksandr Pochenkov	R1: Aleksey Nesov; R2: Aleksey Nesov; R3: Aleksey Nesov	R1: Shortcut: Andrey Gromov; Legends: Sergey Lapitsky; Mitjet: Konstantin Sugrobov; R2: Shortcut: Andrey Gromov; Legends: Sergey Lapitsky; Mitjet: Konstantin Sugrobov	R1: HC2000: Vladimir Cherevan; HC1600: Andrey Kozlov; R2: HC2000: Vladimir Cherevan; HC1600: Andrey Kozlov
4	Kazan Ring, Kazan	20–22 June	R1: Vladimir Atoev; R2: Zakhar Slutsky	R1: Roman Golykov; R2: Nikolay Vikhansky	R1: Vladimir Cherevan; R2: Ilya Rodkin	R1: Vladimir Lobachev; R2: Vasily Korablev	R1: Aleksey Nesov; R2: Aleksey Nesov; R3: Aleksey Nesov	R1: Shortcut: Igor Shunailov; Mitjet: Konstantin Sugrobov; R2: Shortcut: Andrey Gromov; Mitjet: Konstantin Sugrobov	not held
5	ADM Raceway, Moscow	19—21 July	not held	not held	R1: Andrey Maslennikov; R2: Roman Scherbakov	R1: Vladimir Lobachev; R2: Aleksandr Pochenkov	not held	R1: Shortcut: Aleksey Khairov; Legends: Sergey Lapitsky; Mitjet: Konstantin Sugrobov; R2: Shortcut: Aleksandr Dudarev; Legends: Sergey Lapitsky; Mitjet: Konstantin Sugrobov	R1: HC2000: Vladimir Cherevan; HC1600: Andrey Kozlov; R2: HC2000: Vladimir Cherevan; HC1600: Andrey Kozlov
6	Igora Drive, Priozersk	22–24 August	R1: Vladimir Atoev; R2: Aleksandr Smolyar	R1: Leonid Panfilov; R2: Vladimir Sheshenin	R1: Petr Plotnikov; R2: Stanislav Novikov	R1: Nikolay Kalinin; R2: Pavel Sokerkin	R1: Aleksey Nesov; R2: Aleksey Nesov; R3: Sergey Stolyarov	R1: Shortcut: Andrey Gromov; Legends: Alexander Abkhazava; Mitjet: Konstantin Sugrobov; R2: Shortcut: Aleksey Khairov; Legends: Shota Abkhazava; Mitjet: Konstantin Sugrobov	R1: HC2000: Vladimir Cherevan; HC1600: Andrey Kozlov; R2: HC2000: Vladimir Cherevan; HC1600: Andrey Kozlov
7	Moscow Raceway, Volokolamsk	13–15 September	R1: Mikhail Simonov; R2: Pavel Kalmanovich	R1: Kirill Ladygin; R2: Ivan Ovsienko	R1: Stanislav Novikov; R2: Kirill Zinoviev	R1: Aleksandr Pochenkov; R2: Philipp Tuponosov	R1: Aleksey Nesov; R2: Aleksey Nesov; R3: Aleksey Nesov	R1: Shortcut: Sergey Ievlev; Legends: Alexander Abkhazava; Mitjet: Konstantin Sugrobov; R2: Shortcut: Aleksandr Dudarev; Legends: Alexander Abkhazava; Mitjet: Konstantin Sugrobov	R1: HC2000: Vladimir Cherevan; HC1600: O;eg Sokolkin; R2: HC2000: Gleb Semenov; HC1600: Andrey Kozlov
8	Fort Grozny Autodrom, Grozny	3–5 October	R1: Vladimir Atoev; R2: Pavel Kalmanovich	R1: Kirill Ladygin; R2: Andrey Petukhov	R1: Ilya Rodkin; R2: Vladimir Cherevan	R1: Kai Richard Schick; R2: Vladimir Lobachev	R1: Sergey Titarenko; R2: Sergey Titarenko; R3: Sergey Titarenko	not held	not held

== Championship standings ==
Scoring systems

Position	1st	2nd	3rd	4th	5th	6th	7th	8th	9th	10th	11th	12th	13th	14th	15th	PP	FL
Qualification	10	8	6	4	2												
Race 1 Points	30	23	19	16	14	12	10	8	7	6	5	4	3	2	1	**1**	1
Race 2 Points	25	20	16	13	11	10	9	8	7	6	5	4	3	2	1	**1**	1

=== Touring / TCR Russian Touring Car Championship ===
Pos.	Driver	GRO		SMO		NRG		KAZ		IGO		MSC		GRO		Pts.
1	Mikhail Simonov	1	5	3	10	2	4	2	3	9	3	**1**	8	3	10	273
2	Vladimir Atoev	3	3	1	8	3	10	**1**	7	1	Ret	4	10	**1**	9	269
3	Aleksandr Smolyar	2	4	2	Ret	7	2	3	2	7	1	5	3	2	8	248
4	Ivan Chubarov	**5**	8	**7**	5	6	9	4	6	**4**	Ret	2	9	5	4	213
5	Egor Sanin	12	6	11	4	**1**	5	6	5	3	2	3	5	Ret	3	203
6	Pavel Kalmanovich	8	2	5	9	4	6	11†	4	Ret	Ret	9	1	10†	1	172
7	Artem Slutsky	10	10	4	2	9	8	10	9	2	6	11	6	7	2	154
8	Kirill Smal	11	7	9	1	11	11	5	10†	Ret	Ret	6	4	4	5	134
9	Zakhar Slutsky	9	11	12	Ret	10	1	9	1	6	5	10	11	9	7	129
10	Maksim Turiev	7	9	10	7	8	7	8	DNS	5	Ret	8	7	8	6	114
11	Rustam Fatkhutdinov	6	Ret	6	6											38
-	Dmitry Bragin	4	1	8	3	5	3	7	8	8	4	7	2	6	11	0 (Note: Dmitry bragin deprived of all points for unsportsmanlike conduct at the final stage in Grozny.)
Pos.	Driver	GRO		SMO		NRG		KAZ		IGO		MSC		GRO		Pts.

Legend
Gold	Winner
Silver	Second place
Bronze	Third place
Green	Points classification
Blue	Non-points classification
Blue	Non-classified finish (NC)
Purple	Retired, not classified (Ret)
Red	Did not qualify (DNQ)
Red	Did not pre-qualify (DNPQ)
Black	Disqualified (DSQ)
White	Did not start (DNS)
White	Withdrew (WD)
White	Race cancelled (C)
Blank	Did not practice (DNP)
Blank	Did not arrive (DNA)
Blank	Excluded (EX)

**Bold** – Pole
Italics – Fastest Lap

† – Drivers did not finish the race, but were classified as they completed over 75% of the race distance.

==== Touring / TCR Russian Touring Car Championship Team's Standings ====
Pos.	Driver	GRO		SMO		NRG		KAZ		IGO		MSC		GRO		Pts.
1	Lukoil Racing SMP Team	2	3	1	8	3	2	1	2	1	1	4	3	1	8	517
1	Lukoil Racing SMP Team	3	4	2	Ret	7	10	3	7	7	Ret	5	10	2	9	517
2	Innostage AG Team	8	2	5	4	1	5	6	4	3	2	3	1	10†	1	378
2	Innostage AG Team	12	6	11	9	4	6	11†	5	Ret	Ret	9	5	Ret	3	378
3	LADA Sport Rosneft	5	8	7	5	6	7	4	6	4	Ret	2	7	5	4	327
3	LADA Sport Rosneft	7	9	10	7	8	9	8	DNS	5	Ret	8	9	8	6	327
4	Twins Racing	9	10	4	2	9	1	9	1	2	5	10	6	7	2	283
4	Twins Racing	10	11	12	Ret	10	8	10	9	6	6	11	11	9	7	283
5	TAIF Motorsport	1	1	3	3	2	3	2	3	8	3	1	2	3	10	273
5	TAIF Motorsport	4	5	8	10	5	4	7	8	9	4	7	8	6	11	273
Pos.	Driver	GRO		SMO		NRG		KAZ		IGO		MSC		GRO		Pts.

=== Super Production ===
Pos.	Driver	GRO		SMO		NRG		KAZ		IGO		MSC		GRO		Pts.
1	Kirill Ladygin	5	Ret	1	1	**6**	2	2	2	2	Ret	**1**	10	**1**	4	287
2	Vladimir Sheshenin	**1**	1	4	3	3	1	8	5	3	1	9	4	3	8	276
3	Leonid Panfilov	2	3	5	2	1	4	4	Ret	1	3	5	7	4	2	261
4	Roman Golykov	3	2	**2**	5	Ret	Ret	**1**	7	9	2	3	9	2	5	238
5	Andrey Petukhov	4	8	3	4	2	Ret	5	8	4	4	11	5	Ret	1	187
6	Maksim Arkhangelsky	7	Ret	7	6	4	Ret	Ret	DNS	**6**	8	2	2	5	3	165
7	Ivan Ovsienko	6	4	6	9	Ret	3	Ret	3	8	6	10	1	6	Ret	145
8	Nikolay Vikhansky	8	6			5	5	3	1	7	7	4	3			134
9	Artemy Melnikov	8	5	Ret	7	Ret	6	6	4	5	9†	6	6	7	7	126
10	Aleksandr Garmash	9	Ret			Ret	Ret	7	6	10	5	7	11	Ret	6	69
11	Artem Kosarev	10	7	8	8	DNS	DNS									31
12	Eugeny Sheklachev											8	8			16
Pos.	Driver	GRO		SMO		NRG		KAZ		IGO		MSC		GRO		Pts.

Legend
Gold	Winner
Silver	Second place
Bronze	Third place
Green	Points classification
Blue	Non-points classification
Blue	Non-classified finish (NC)
Purple	Retired, not classified (Ret)
Red	Did not qualify (DNQ)
Red	Did not pre-qualify (DNPQ)
Black	Disqualified (DSQ)
White	Did not start (DNS)
White	Withdrew (WD)
White	Race cancelled (C)
Blank	Did not practice (DNP)
Blank	Did not arrive (DNA)
Blank	Excluded (EX)

**Bold** – Pole
Italics – Fastest Lap

† – Drivers did not finish the race, but were classified as they completed over 75% of the race distance.

==== Super Production Team's Standings ====
Pos.	Driver	GRO		SMO		NRG		KAZ		IGO		MSC		GRO		Pts.
1	LADA Sport Rosneft	2	3	1	1	1	2	2	2	1	3	1	7	1	2	564
1	LADA Sport Rosneft	5	Ret	5	2	4	6	4	Ret	2	Ret	5	10	4	4	564
2	LECAR	1	1	3	3	2	1	5	5	3	1	9	4	3	1	471
2	LECAR	4	8	4	4	3	Ret	8	8	4	4	11	5	Ret	8	471
3	Sofit Racing Team	6	4	6	6	4	3	Ret	3	6	6	2	1	5	3	316
3	Sofit Racing Team	7	Ret	7	9	Ret	Ret	Ret	DNS	8	8	10	2	7	7	316
Pos.	Driver	GRO		SMO		NRG		KAZ		IGO		MSC		GRO		Pts.

=== Touring Light ===
Pos.	Driver	GRO		NRG		KAZ		ADM		IGO		MSC		GRO		Pts.
1	Petr Plotnikov	3	2	5	7	3	4	12	8	1	5	16	11	1	6	235
2	Andrey Maslennikov	5	3	**1**	17	Ret	3	**1**	6	6	2	3	2	9	7	225
3	Vladimir Cherevan	**1**	6	7	9	**1**	14	5	7	12	13	2	5	5	1	221
4	Nikolay Karamyshev	2	17†	6	1	2	9	3	2	4	6	4	7	6	4	219
5	Maksim Soldatov	4	9	4	3	8	2	9	17	**3**	3	10	9	**4**	2	218
6	Stanislav Novikov	10	Ret	Ret	Ret	5	6	6	3	7	1	**1**	6	13	5	183
7	Daniil Kharashun	Ret	1	3	12	4	Ret	4	15	2	7	6	Ret	3	11	171
8	Ilya Rodkin	8	4	8	13	6	1	13	9	8	17	7	18†	2	12	129
9	Roman Scherbakov			17	Ret	11	7	7	1	13	8	11	8	8	8	93
10	Dmitry Dudarev	18	Ret	9	8	15	10	8	4	14	10	Ret	4	Ret	3	88
11	Ivan Tverdokhlebov	7	8	11	4	7	5	11	Ret	9	Ret	5	13			88
12	Artem Antonov	6	10	2	2	9	DNS									74
13	Denis Karelin	12	11	12	11	12	12	10	12	5	Ret	8	Ret			60
14	Artem Fridman	11	5	10	Ret	10	8	Ret	10	11	12	Ret	10			57
15	Kirill Zinoviev	13	14	18	5	Ret	11	16	16	Ret	9	Ret	1	Ret	Ret	54
16	Ilya Sidorov	9	12	15	DSQ	Ret	DNS	Ret	11	16	14	Ret	3	7	13	43
17	Aleksandr Chachava	16†	18†	14	10	14	13	15	13	18	11	13	15	12	10	37
18	Mikhail Simonov							2	5							35
19	Aleksey Savin	17	7	16	Ret			DSQ	Ret	10	4	9	Ret			35
20	Tatiana Eliseeva	14	13	Ret	6	DNS	DNS					Ret	16	11	14	22
21	Daniil Kovalev	15	15	13	14	13	Ret	14	14	Ret	15	14	14			15
22	Viktor Sidorkin													10	9	13
23	Stepan Anufriev							Ret	Ret	15	16	12	12			9
24	Azat Kalimullin	Ret	16†	DNS	15					17	DSQ					1
25	Aleksandr Salnikov											15	17			1
26	Rais Minnikhanov							17	18							0
Pos.	Driver	GRO		NRG		KAZ		ADM		IGO		MSC		GRO		Pts.

Legend
Gold	Winner
Silver	Second place
Bronze	Third place
Green	Points classification
Blue	Non-points classification
Blue	Non-classified finish (NC)
Purple	Retired, not classified (Ret)
Red	Did not qualify (DNQ)
Red	Did not pre-qualify (DNPQ)
Black	Disqualified (DSQ)
White	Did not start (DNS)
White	Withdrew (WD)
White	Race cancelled (C)
Blank	Did not practice (DNP)
Blank	Did not arrive (DNA)
Blank	Excluded (EX)

**Bold** – Pole
Italics – Fastest Lap

† – Drivers did not finish the race, but were classified as they completed over 75% of the race distance.

==== Touring Light Team's Standings ====
Pos.	Driver	GRO		NRG		KAZ		ADM		IGO		MSC		GRO		Pts.
1	Rally Academy	2	2	5	1	2	4	3	2	1	5	4	7	1	4	446
1	Rally Academy	3	17†	7	6	3	9	12	8	4	6	16	11	6	6	446
2	Kuzma's Mother Racing Team	1	6	7	8	1	10	5	4	12	10	2	4	5	1	307
2	Kuzma's Mother Racing Team	18	Ret	9	9	15	14	8	7	14	13	Ret	5	Ret	3	307
3	Rumos Racing	8	1	3	12	4	1	4	9	2	7	6	18†	2	11	301
3	Rumos Racing	Ret	4	8	13	6	Ret	13	15	8	17	7	Ret	3	12	301
4	Innostage AG Team	6	10	2	2	5	6	6	3	7	1	1	6	7	5	277
4	Innostage AG Team	10	Ret	Ret	Ret	9	DNS	Ret	11	16	14	13	15	13	13	277
5	Bragin Racing Team	4	5	4	3	8	2	9	10	3	3	10	9	4	2	269
5	Bragin Racing Team	11	9	10	Ret	10	8	Ret	17	11	12	Ret	10			269
6	Lukoil Racing Team	5	3	1	14	13	3	1	6	6	2	3	2	9	7	243
6	Lukoil Racing Team	15	15	13	17	Ret	Ret	14	14	Ret	15	14	14			243
7	Powerfuls	7	8	11	4	7	5	10	12	5	Ret	5	13			148
7	Powerfuls	12	11	12	11	12	12	11	Ret	9	Ret	8	Ret			148
Pos.	Driver	GRO		NRG		KAZ		ADM		IGO		MSC		GRO		Pts.

=== S1600 ===
Pos.	Driver	GRO		NRG		KAZ		ADM		IGO		MSC		GRO		Pts.
1	Vasiliy Karablev	9	2	**2**	4	2	1	3	2	2	12	5	Ret	2	2	283
2	Nikolay Kalinin	4	1	1	3	8	8	**12**	Ret	1	11	2	7	**5**	6	244
3	Aleksandr Pochenkov	5	3	3	1	Ret	DNS	11	1	6	3	**1**	4	4	4	228
4	Vladimir Lobachev	**Ret**	DNS	6	6	1	2	1	Ret	**3**	10	6	2	6	1	219
5	Kai Richard Schick	6	5	4	8	Ret	4	2	6	4	2	10	3	1	9†	206
6	Mikhail Pochenkov	2	Ret	10	2	4	Ret	5	3	5	4	4	6	3	5	194
7	Philipp Tuponosov	3	4	8	DNS	**3**	DNS	4	Ret	9	8	3	1	7	3	188
8	Ruslan Safin					7	7	8	4	Ret	5	11	9	10†	7	78
9	Viktor Sidorkin					6	6	7	5	7	7	9	Ret			69
10	Konstantin Shitov									8	6	8	5	8	8	53
11	Mikhail Dralin	7	6	5	5	DNS	DNS									51
12	Stepan Anufriev			7	7	5	3									49
13	Pavel Sokerkin							6	Ret	Ret	1					41
14	Albert Zinatov							9	7	10	9	12	Ret	9	Ret	40
15	Roman Scherbakov	1	Ret													38
16	Yaroslav Grekov			9	9			10	Ret							20
17	Artem Volkov											7	8			18
18	Dmitry Shishko	8	7													17
19	Rais Minnikhanov					Ret	5									11
Pos.	Driver	GRO		NRG		KAZ		ADM		IGO		MSC		GRO		Pts.

Legend
Gold	Winner
Silver	Second place
Bronze	Third place
Green	Points classification
Blue	Non-points classification
Blue	Non-classified finish (NC)
Purple	Retired, not classified (Ret)
Red	Did not qualify (DNQ)
Red	Did not pre-qualify (DNPQ)
Black	Disqualified (DSQ)
White	Did not start (DNS)
White	Withdrew (WD)
White	Race cancelled (C)
Blank	Did not practice (DNP)
Blank	Did not arrive (DNA)
Blank	Excluded (EX)

**Bold** – Pole
Italics – Fastest Lap

† – Drivers did not finish the race, but were classified as they completed over 75% of the race distance.

==== S1600 Team's Standings ====
Pos.	Driver	GRO		NRG		KAZ		ADM		IGO		MSC		GRO		Pts.
1	GTE Racing Team	3	4	5	5	3	DNS	4	4	9	5	3	1	7	3	298
1	GTE Racing Team	7	6	8	DNS	DNS	DNS	8	Ret	Ret	8	11	9	10†	7	298
2	GTE Racing Team Plus									8	6	8	5	8	8	77
2	GTE Racing Team Plus									10	9	12	Ret	9	Ret	77
Pos.	Driver	GRO		NRG		KAZ		ADM		IGO		MSC		GRO		Pts.

=== SMP GT4 Russia ===
Pos.	Driver	GRO			NRG			KAZ			IGO			MSC			GRO			Pts.
1	Aleksey Nesov	2	1	1	**1**	1	1	1	1	1	**1**	1	2	1	1	1				464
2	Sergey Titarenko	**1**	DSQ	2	2	6	2	**2**	2	2	6	2	4	**2**	2	3	**1**	1	1	420
3	Sergey Stolyarov	4	2	4	3	2	5	3	3	Ret	Ret	6	1	6	4	13	6	8	DNS	247
4	Irina Sidorkova	5	3	3	4	4	Ret	7	4	Ret	11	4	Ret	5	3	7	3	6	4	233
5	Andrey Solukovtsev	9	DSQ	5	5	5	6	4	5	12	3	8	3	Ret	6	8	2	2	Ret	219
6	Denis Remenyako	3	Ret	10†	Ret	Ret	4	6	7	5	13	5	6	7	5	4	4	4	5	184
7	Rinat Salikhov				6	3	Ret	5	6	3	7	3	12†	4	7	2				166
8	Lev Tolkachev	DNS	6	9†	7	8	DNS	8	9	6	9	11	7	Ret	8	6	5	3	2	158
9	Dmitry Rodionov	7	5	7	11	9	7	11	14	8	12	15	11	9	10	10	Ret	5	3	128
10	Svetlana Gorbunova	8	7	Ret	10	10	9	12	13	10	2	14	Ret	8	11	12	DNS	7	6	112
11	Dmitry Anastasiadis	6	4	8	DSQ	13	10	Ret	10	4	8	9	5	10	13	9				106
12	Nikita Silaev				9	12	8	10	11	11	4	12	9	11	12	11				76
13	David Pogosyan										5	7	Ret	3	9	5				71
14	Andrey Goncharov				8	11	3	13	8	9	10	13	8	Ret	DNS	DNS				64
15	Vadim Mescheryakov				12	7	11	9	12	7										39
16	Dionis Anastasiadis	10	8	6																24
17	Ilya Gorbatskiy										DSQ	10	10							12
Pos.	Driver	GRO			NRG			KAZ			IGO			MSC			GRO			Pts.

Legend
Gold	Winner
Silver	Second place
Bronze	Third place
Green	Points classification
Blue	Non-points classification
Blue	Non-classified finish (NC)
Purple	Retired, not classified (Ret)
Red	Did not qualify (DNQ)
Red	Did not pre-qualify (DNPQ)
Black	Disqualified (DSQ)
White	Did not start (DNS)
White	Withdrew (WD)
White	Race cancelled (C)
Blank	Did not practice (DNP)
Blank	Did not arrive (DNA)
Blank	Excluded (EX)

**Bold** – Pole
Italics – Fastest Lap

† – Drivers did not finish the race, but were classified as they completed over 75% of the race distance.

==== SMP GT4 Russia Team's Standings ====
Pos.	Driver	GRO			NRG			KAZ			IGO			MSC			GRO			Pts.
1	X Motorsport Team Garis	1	5	2	2	6	2	2	2	2	6	2	4	2	2	3	1	1	1	560
1	X Motorsport Team Garis	7	DSQ	7	11	9	7	11	14	8	12	15	11	9	10	10	Ret	5	3	560
2	SMP Racing Motor Sharks	2	1	1	1	1	1	1	1	1	1	1	2	1	1	1				464
3	YADRO Motorsport	4	2	4	3	2	5	3	3	3	7	3	1	4	4	2	6	8	DNS	422
3	YADRO Motorsport				6	3	Ret	5	6	Ret	Ret	6	12†	6	7	13				422
4	RUMOS Racing	8	6	9†	7	8	9	8	9	6	2	11	7	8	8	6	5	3	2	266
4	RUMOS Racing	DNS	7	Ret	10	10	DNS	12	13	10	9	14	Ret	Ret	11	12	DNS	7	6	266
5	Capital Racing Team	3	Ret	10†	Ret	Ret	4	6	7	5	13	5	6	7	5	4	4	4	5	182
Pos.	Driver	GRO			NRG			KAZ			IGO			MSC			GRO			Pts.
