= Conflenti =

- Comune
- Comune di Conflenti
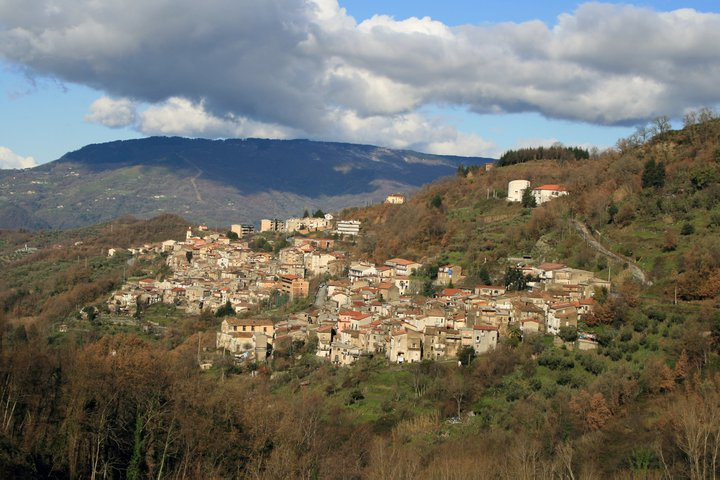

- Location within Italy Location within Calabria
- Coordinates: 39°04′N 16°17′E
- Country: Italy
- Region: Calabria
- Province: Catanzaro (CZ)
- Frazioni: San Mazzeo, Costa, Stranges, Calusci, Abritti, Coscaro, Sciosci, Galli, Cerzulla, Vallone Cupo, Annetta, Muraglie

Government
  - Mayor: Serafino Pietro Paola

Area
  - Total: 29.34 km^{2} (11.33 sq mi)
- Elevation: 550 m (1,800 ft)

Population (30 June 2017)
  - Total: 1,408
  - Density: 47.99/km^{2} (124.3/sq mi)
- Demonym: Conflentesi
- Time zone: UTC+1 (CET)
  - Summer (DST): UTC+2 (CEST)
- Postal code: 88040
- Dialing code: 0968
- Website: Official website

Conflenti (Calabrian: Cujjìanti) is a comune and town in the province of Catanzaro in the Calabria region of southern Italy.

It is located at the foot of the Reventino mountain.

== People ==
- Antonio Porchia
