= American Poetry Museum =

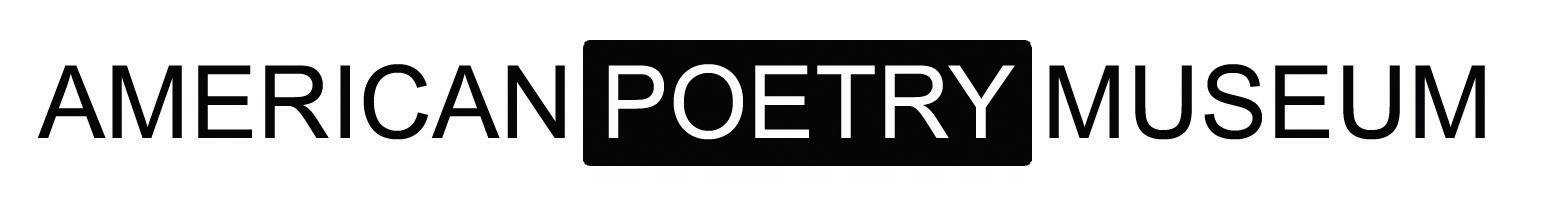

- Location within Washington, D.C.
- Established: 2004
- Location: 716 Monroe St NE Washington, D.C.
- Coordinates: 38.93328°N 76.995°W
- Public transit access: Brookland–CUA
- Website: americanpoetrymuseum.org

The American Poetry Museum (APM) is a museum dedicated to American poetry, located in Brookland, Washington, D.C., United States.

The museum was founded in 2004.

As well as a traditional museum role, APM also provides a community meeting place.
