= APM Monaco =

Monaco jewellery company

- Type: Privately held company
- Industry: Jewelry
- Founded: 1982; 44 years ago
- Founder: Ariane Prette, Philippe Prette
- Number of locations: 500+ (2025)
- Key people: Philippe Prette, chief executive; Kika Prette, creative director; Louis Prette, general manager
- Website: www.apm.mc

APM Monaco is a fashion jewelry company. It was started in Monaco in 1982 by Ariane Prette and her son Philippe Prette.

APM Monaco is a fashion jewelry company founded in Monaco in 1982 by Ariane Prette and her son Philippe Prette. Originally focused on manufacturing fine jewelry for luxury brands, the company transitioned into a fashion jewelry brand in 2012 under the leadership of Philippe, now CEO, and his wife Kika Prette, Creative Director.

In 1992, production was relocated to China. The company is headquartered in Hong Kong and Monaco. In 2019, TPG Capital acquired a 30% stake in the business.

APM Monaco opened its first branded boutiques in Cannes and Rome in 2013. By 2015, it had expanded to over 30 stores globally; by 2017, 130 stores, with 75 located in Asia and Australia. As of 2025, APM Monaco operates over 500 boutiques in more than 26 countries and employs approximately 2,300 people.
