= Decollatura =

- Comune
- Comune di Decollatura
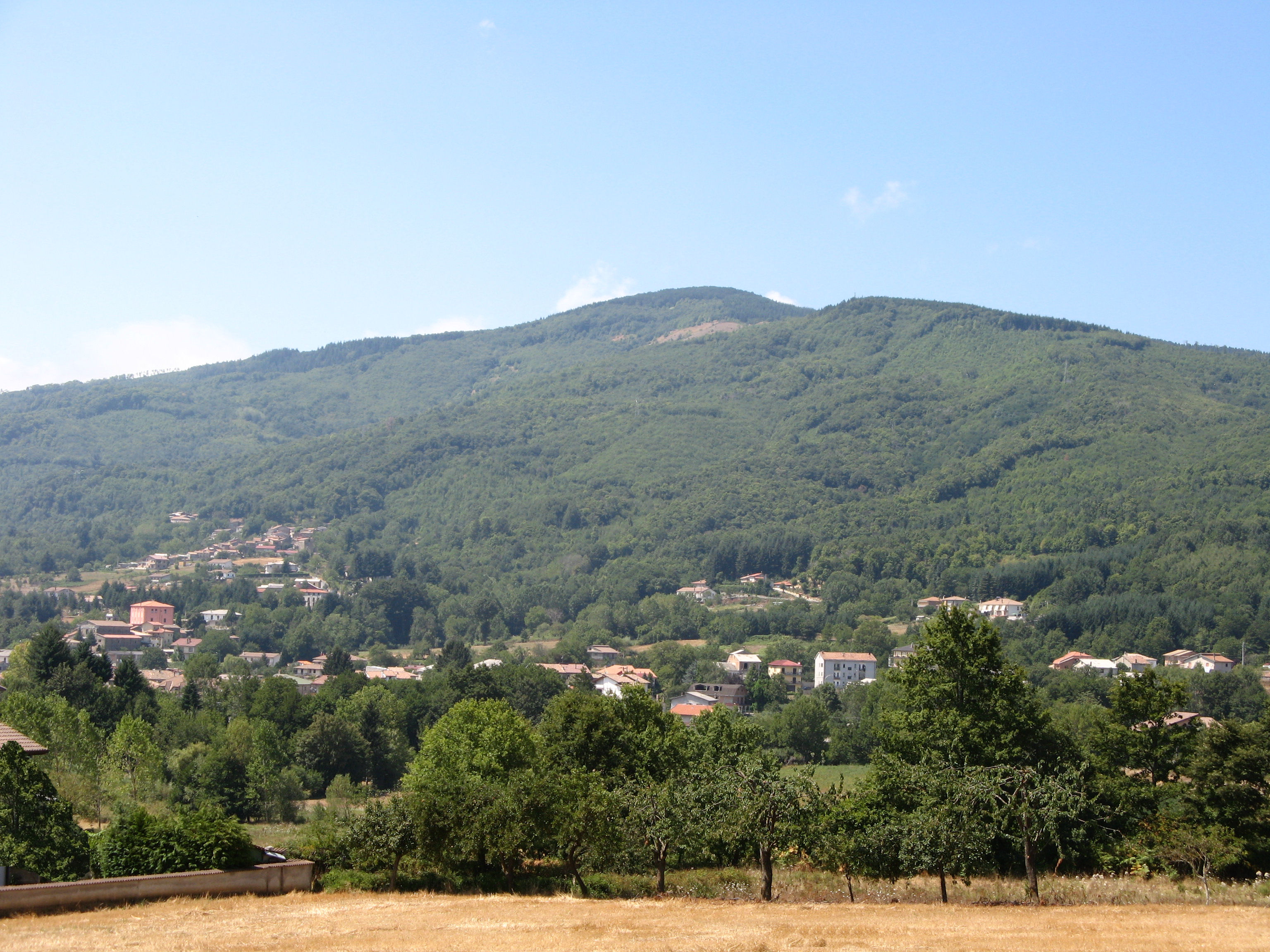

- Location within Italy Location within Calabria
- Coordinates: 39°3′N 16°21′E
- Country: Italy
- Region: Calabria
- Province: Catanzaro (CZ)
- Frazioni: San Bernardo, Adami, Casenove, Cerrisi

Government
  - Mayor: Angela Brigante

Area
  - Total: 50.83 km^{2} (19.63 sq mi)
- Elevation: 744 m (2,441 ft)

Population (31 December 2013)
  - Total: 3,188
  - Density: 62.72/km^{2} (162.4/sq mi)
- Demonym: Decollaturesi
- Time zone: UTC+1 (CET)
  - Summer (DST): UTC+2 (CEST)
- Postal code: 88041
- Dialing code: 0968
- Website: Official website

Decollatura is a comune in the province of Catanzaro in the Calabria region of southern Italy. It was the birthplace of the Italian poet Michele Pane (1876–1953).

== Twin cities ==
- Danbury, United States

== Sources ==
- Imperio Assisi et al., Decollatura e Motta S. Lucia: due comunità del Reventino, Decollatura: Grafica Reventino, 1980.
- Pietro Bonacci: Decollatura, vicende sociali e religiose dal Seicento all'Ottocento, Decollatura: Grafica Reventino, 1982.
- Mario Gallo: Decollatura nella Storia, Decollatura: Grafica Reventino, 1982.
