= 2019 Gulf 12 Hours =

9th Gulf 12 Hours endurance race

The layout of Yas Marina Circuit

The 2019 Gulf 12 Hours was the ninth edition of the Gulf 12 Hours held at Yas Marina Circuit on 14 December 2019. It was organized by Driving Force Events Ltd. and contested with GT3-spec, GT4-spec, Lamborghini Super Trofeo, Porsche Cup and LMP3 cars.

The race was won by Christopher Mies, Rinat Salikhov and Dries Vanthoor in the #66 Attempto Racing Audi R8 LMS.

== Race Results ==
=== Part 1 ===
Class winners denoted in bold.

Pos.	Class	No.	Team	Drivers	Car	Laps	Time/Gap
1	**GT3 Pro**	**66**	**(Germany) Attempto Racing**	**(Germany) Christopher Mies** **(Russia) Rinat Salikhov** **(Belgium) Dries Vanthoor**	**Audi R8 LMS**	**158**	**5:59:54.141**
2	GT3 Pro	55	(Germany) Attempto Racing	(Russia) Murod Sultanov (Australia) Nick Foster (Italy) Mattia Drudi	Audi R8 LMS	158	+2:11.987
3	GT3 Pro	19	(United Arab Emirates) GPX Racing	(United Kingdom) Stuart Hall (Germany) Benji Goethe (South Africa) Jordan Grogor	Porsche 911 GT3 R	157	+1 Lap
4	GT3 Pro	83	(Italy) Iron Lynx	(Italy) Manuela Gostner (Switzerland) Rahel Frey (Denmark) Michelle Gatting	Ferrari 488 GT3	157	+1 Lap
5	GT3 Pro	48	(Germany) HTP Motorsport	(Saudi Arabia) Abdulaziz Al Faisal (Austria) Dominik Baumann (Germany) Maximilian Götz	Mercedes-AMG GT3	156	+2 Laps
6	**GT3 Pro-Am**	**46**	**(Switzerland) Monster VR46 Kessel**	**(Italy) Valentino Rossi** **(Italy) Alessio Salucci** **(Italy) Luca Marini**	**Ferrari 488 GT3**	**156**	**+2 Laps**
7	GT3 Pro-Am	7	(Italy) Dinamic Motorsport	(Italy) Roberto Pampanini (Switzerland) Ivan Jacoma (Switzerland) Mauro Calamia	Porsche 911 GT3 R	156	+2 Laps
8	GT3 Pro-Am	77	(United Kingdom) Barwell Motorsport	(Switzerland) Adrian Amstutz (United Kingdom) Jordan Witt (Portugal) Miguel Ramos (Finland) Patrick Kujala	Lamborghini Huracán GT3 Evo	155	+3 Laps
9	GT3 Pro-Am	5	(Germany) Spirit Race Team Uwe Alzen Automotive	(Germany) Uwe Alzen (Germany) Dietmar Haggenmueller (Austria) Martin Konrad	Audi R8 LMS Evo	155	+3 Laps
10	GT3 Pro-Am	8	(Italy) LP Racing	(China) Alex Liang Jiatong (Kuwait) Bashar Mardini (Italy) Luca Pirri (Italy) Stefano Costantini	Lamborghini Huracán GT3 Evo	155	+3 Laps
11	**GT3 Gent**	**10**	**(Germany) SPS Automotive Performance**	**(Germany) Valentin Pierburg** **(Germany) Christian Hook** **(Germany) Manuel Lauck**	**Mercedes-AMG GT3**	**155**	**+3 Laps**
12 DNF	GT3 Gent	84	(France) AKKA ASP	(France) Benjamin Ricci (Italy) Mauro Ricci (France) Jérôme Policand	Mercedes-AMG GT3	154	+4 Laps
13	**GT Cup 1**	**12**	**(Georgia (country)) Art Line Team Georgia**	**(Kazakhstan) Shota Abkhazava** **(United Kingdom) Stephen Liquorish** **(United Kingdom) Jack Butel** **(Russia) Sergey Afanasyev**	**Lamborghini Huracán Super Trofeo**	**154**	**+4 Laps**
14	GT3 Gent	65	(Switzerland) Kessel Racing	(Luxembourg) Alexis De Bernardi (Italy) Loris Capirossi (Italy) Niki Cadei	Ferrari 488 GT3	153	+5 Laps
15	GT Cup 1	88	(United Arab Emirates) Dragon Racing	(United Kingdom) Glynn Geddie (United Kingdom) Jim Geddie (United Arab Emirates) Karim Al Azhari	Lamborghini Huracán Super Trofeo Evo	152	+6 Laps
16	GT3 Gent	11	(Italy) AF Corse	(Lebanon) Tani Hanna (Switzerland) Christoph Ulrich (Greece) Kriton Lentoudis (Portugal) Rui Aguas	Ferrari 488 GT3	152	+6 Laps
17	GT3 Gent	33	(Switzerland) Kessel Racing	(United Kingdom) John Hartshorne (Italy) Marco Zanuttini (South Africa) David Perel (Turkey) Murat Cuhadaroglu	Ferrari 488 GT3	151	+7 Laps
18	**LMP3**	**4**	**(Slovakia) ARC Bratislava**	**(Slovakia) Miro Konôpka** **(Australia) Neale Muston** **(South Africa) Simon Murray**	**Ginetta-Juno P3-15**	**147**	**+11 Laps**
19	GT Cup 1	81	(San Marino) GDL Racing	(Italy) Gabriele Murroni (Italy) Mario Cordoni (Italy) Angelo Negro	Lamborghini Huracán Super Trofeo	147	+11 Laps
20	GT3 Pro-Am	20	(United Arab Emirates) GPX Racing	(Netherlands) Nico Pronk (Slovakia) Stanislav Minsky (France) Fredric Fatien (Austria) Klaus Bachler	Porsche 911 GT3 R	146	+12 Laps
21	LMP3	2	(United Kingdom) United Autosports	(United States) Jim Mcguire (United Kingdom) Richard Meins (United Kingdom) Shaun Lynn	Ligier JS P3	145	+13 Laps
22	**GT Cup 2**	**14**	**(Germany) MRS GT Racing**	**(Belgium) Glenn van Parijs** **(United Kingdom) JM Littmann** **(United Kingdom) Graeme Mundy**	**Porsche 911 GT3 Cup**	**144**	**+14 Laps**
23	**GT4**	**22**	**(United Kingdom) Balfe Motorsport**	**(United Kingdom) Ollie Millroy** **(United Kingdom) James Pickford** **(United States) Brendan Iribe** **(United Kingdom) Nick Moss**	**McLaren 570S GT4**	**140**	**+18 Laps**
24	GT4	21	(United Kingdom) Balfe Motorsport	(Sweden) Mia Flewitt (United Kingdom) Joshua Cook (United Kingdom) Euan Aiers-hankey (Saudi Arabia) Issam Charrouf	McLaren 570S GT4	140	+18 Laps
25	GT4	90	(Italy) SVC Sport Management	(Italy) Amedeo Pampanini (Italy) Michele Camarlinghi (Switzerland) Stefano Monaco (Switzerland) Linus Diener	Mercedes-AMG GT4	140	+18 Laps
26	GT4	44	(United Kingdom) DAE (David Appleby Engineering)	(United Kingdom) James Holder (United Kingdom) Matthew George (United Kingdom) Steve Tandy	Aston Martin Vantage GT4	140	+18 Laps
27	GT Cup 2	87	(San Marino) GDL Racing	(United States) Jim Michaelian (United Arab Emirates) Mohammed Hussain (North Macedonia) Risto Vukov	Porsche 911 GT3 Cup	140	+18 Laps
28	GT4	84	(United Kingdom) Optimum Motorsport	(Australia) David Whitmore (United States) Michael Dinan (United Kingdom) David Holloway (United Kingdom) Graham Johnson	Aston Martin Vantage AMR GT4	139	+19 Laps
29	GT4	18	(France) 3Y Technology	(United Arab Emirates) Ahmad Almoosa (United Arab Emirates) Saif Alameri (United Arab Emirates) Sheikh Hasher Al Maktoum (United Arab Emirates) Saeed Al Mehairi	BMW M4 GT4	138	+20 Laps
30	GT3 Gent	9	(France) 3Y Technology	(France) Philippe Bourgois (Taiwan) Oscar Lee (France) Gilles Vannelet	BMW M6 GT3	136	+22 Laps

=== Part 2 ===
Class winners denoted in bold.

Pos.	Class	No.	Team	Drivers	Car	Laps	Time/Gap
1	**GT3 Pro**	**66**	**(Germany) Attempto Racing**	**(Germany) Christopher Mies** **(Russia) Rinat Salikhov** **(Belgium) Dries Vanthoor**	**Audi R8 LMS**	**316**	**6:02:07.348**
2	GT3 Pro	55	(Germany) Attempto Racing	(Russia) Murod Sultanov (Australia) Nick Foster (Italy) Mattia Drudi	Audi R8 LMS	316	+1:33.331
3	**GT3 Pro-Am**	**46**	**(Switzerland) Monster VR46 Kessel**	**(Italy) Valentino Rossi** **(Italy) Alessio Salucci** **(Italy) Luca Marini**	**Ferrari 488 GT3**	**312**	**+4 Laps**
4	GT3 Pro-Am	5	(Germany) Spirit Race Team Uwe Alzen Automotive	(Germany) Uwe Alzen (Germany) Dietmar Haggenmueller (Austria) Martin Konrad	Audi R8 LMS Evo	311	+5 Laps
5	**GT3 Gent**	**10**	**(Germany) SPS Automotive Performance**	**(Germany) Valentin Pierburg** **(Germany) Christian Hook** **(Germany) Manuel Lauck**	**Mercedes-AMG GT3**	**311**	**+5 Laps**
6	GT3 Pro	19	(United Arab Emirates) GPX Racing	(United Kingdom) Stuart Hall (Germany) Benji Goethe (South Africa) Jordan Grogor	Porsche 911 GT3 R	311	+5 Laps
7	GT3 Gent	65	(Switzerland) Kessel Racing	(Luxembourg) Alexis De Bernardi (Italy) Loris Capirossi (Italy) Nicola Cadei	Ferrari 488 GT3	308	+8 Laps
8	**GT Cup 1**	**12**	**(Georgia (country)) Art Line Team Georgia**	**(Kazakhstan) Shota Abkhazava** **(United Kingdom) Stephen Liquorish** **(United Kingdom) Jack Butel** **(Russia) Sergey Afanasyev**	**Lamborghini Huracán Super Trofeo**	**308**	**+8 Laps**
9	GT Cup 1	88	(United Arab Emirates) Dragon Racing	(United Kingdom) Glynn Geddie (United Kingdom) Jim Geddie (United Arab Emirates) Karim Al Azhari	Lamborghini Huracán Super Trofeo Evo	307	+9 Laps
10	GT3 Gent	11	(Italy) AF Corse	(Lebanon) Tani Hanna (Switzerland) Christophe Ulrich (Greece) Kriton Lentoudis (Portugal) Rui Aguas	Ferrari 488 GT3	305	+11 Laps
11	GT3 Gent	33	(Switzerland) Kessel Racing	(United Kingdom) John Hartshorne (Italy) Marco Zanuttini (South Africa) David Perel (Turkey) Murat Cuhadaroglu	Ferrari 488 GT3	303	+13 Laps
12	GT3 Pro	48	(Germany) HTP Motorsport	(Saudi Arabia) Abdulaziz Al Faisal (Austria) Dominik Baumann (Germany) Maximilian Götz	Mercedes-AMG GT3	301	+15 Laps
13	GT3 Pro-Am	8	(Italy) LP Racing	(China) Alex Liang Jiatong (Kuwait) Bashar Mardini (Italy) Luca Pirri (Italy) Stefano Costantini	Lamborghini Huracán GT3 Evo	300	+16 Laps
14	**LMP3**	**4**	**(Slovakia) ARC Bratislava**	**(Slovakia) Miro Konôpka** **(Australia) Neale Muston** **(South Africa) Simon Murray**	**Ginetta-Juno P3-15**	**298**	**+18 Laps**
15	LMP3	2	(United Kingdom) United Autosports	(United States) Jim Mcguire (United Kingdom) Richard Meins (United Kingdom) Shaun Lynn	Ligier JS P3	297	+19 Laps
16	GT3 Pro-Am	20	(United Arab Emirates) GPX Racing	(Netherlands) Nico Pronk (Slovakia) Stanislav Minsky (France) Fredric Fatien (Austria) Klaus Bachler	Porsche 911 GT3 R	296	+20 Laps
17	GT3 Gent	9	(France) 3Y Technology	(France) Philippe Bourgois (Taiwan) Oscar Lee (France) Gilles Vannelet	BMW M6 GT3	287	+29 Laps
18	**GT4**	**22**	**(United Kingdom) Balfe Motorsport**	**(United Kingdom) Ollie Millroy** **(United Kingdom) James Pickford** **(United States) Brendan Iribe** **(United Kingdom) Nick Moss**	**McLaren 570S GT4**	**282**	**+34 Laps**
19	GT4	21	(United Kingdom) Balfe Motorsport	(Sweden) Mia Flewitt (United Kingdom) Joshua Cook (United Kingdom) Euan Aiers-hankey (Saudi Arabia) Issam Charrouf	McLaren 570S GT4	282	+34 Laps
20	GT4	90	(Italy) SVC Sport Management	(Italy) Amedeo Pampanini (Italy) Michele Camarlinghi (Switzerland) Stefano Monaco (Switzerland) Linus Diener	Mercedes-AMG GT4	281	+35 Laps
21	GT Cup 1	81	(San Marino) GDL Racing	(Italy) Gabriele Murroni (Italy) Mario Cordoni (Italy) Angelo Negro	Lamborghini Huracán Super Trofeo	281	+35 Laps
22	GT4	18	(France) 3Y Technology	(United Arab Emirates) Ahmad Almoosa (United Arab Emirates) Saif Alameri (United Arab Emirates) Sheikh Hasher Al Maktoum (United Arab Emirates) Saeed Al Mehairi	BMW M4 GT4	278	+38 Laps
23	GT4	15	(United Kingdom) Optimum Motorsport	(Australia) David Whitmore (United States) Michael Dinan (United Kingdom) David Holloway (United Kingdom) Graham Johnson	Aston Martin Vantage AMR GT4	275	+41 Laps
24	**GT Cup 2**	**14**	**(Germany) MRS GT Racing**	**(Belgium) Glenn van Parijs** **(United Kingdom) JM Littmann** **(United Kingdom) Graeme Mundy**	**Porsche 911 GT3 Cup**	**292**	**+24 Laps**
25 DNF	GT3 Pro-Am	7	(Italy) Dinamic Motorsport	(Italy) Roberto Pampanini (Switzerland) Ivan Jacoma (Switzerland) Mauro Calamia	Porsche 911 GT3 R	265	+51 Laps
26 DNF	GT3 Gent	84	(France) AKKA ASP	(France) Benjamin Ricci (Italy) Mauro Ricci (France) Jérôme Policand	Mercedes-AMG GT3	256	+60 Laps
27	GT Cup 2	87	(San Marino) GDL Racing	(United States) Jim Michaelian (United Arab Emirates) Mohammed Hussain (North Macedonia) Risto Vukov	Porsche 911 GT3 Cup	255	+61 Laps
28 DNF	GT3 Pro-Am	77	(United Kingdom) Barwell Motorsport	(Switzerland) Adrian Amstutz (United Kingdom) Jordan Witt (Portugal) Miguel Ramos (Finland) Patrick Kujala	Lamborghini Huracán GT3 Evo	186	+130 Laps
29 DNF	GT3 Pro	83	(Italy) Iron Lynx	(Italy) Manuela Gostner (Switzerland) Rahel Frey (Denmark) Michelle Gatting	Ferrari 488 GT3	174	+142 Laps
30 DNF	GT4	44	(United Kingdom) DAE (David Appleby Engineering)	(United Kingdom) James Holder (United Kingdom) Matthew George (United Kingdom) Steve Tandy	Aston Martin Vantage GT4	149	+167 Laps
