= Rinat Salikhov =

Russian racing driver (born 1985)

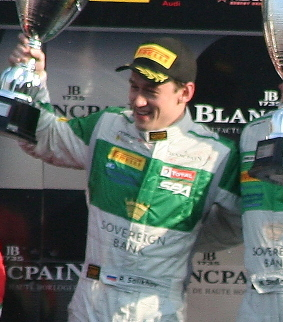
- Salikhov in 2015
- Nationality: (Russia) Russian
- Born: 15 December 1985 (age 40) Moscow, Russian SFSR, Soviet Union
- Categorisation: FIA Silver (2014–2015); FIA Bronze (2016–)

Championship titles
- 2023: SMP GT4 Russia

Rinat Salikhov (Russian: Ринат Салихов; born 15 December 1985) is a Russian racing driver who last competed for Winward Racing in GT World Challenge Europe.

Between 2014 and 2019, Salikhov competed in the Blancpain Endurance Series for Ferrari and Rinaldi Racing, achieving an overall podium finish at Monza and a class victory at the 24 Hours of Spa. In 2019, he won the Gulf 12 Hours overall for Attempto Racing. Salikhov returned to GT World Challenge Europe in 2025, driving a Mercedes-AMG for Winward Racing.

== Career ==
Salikhov made his racing debut in 2013, competing part-time for Rinaldi Racing in the V de V Michelin Endurance Series. The following year, Salikhov made his full-time racing debut, competing for Sportec Motorsport in Porsche Carrera Cup Italy, taking four points finishes and ending the year 14th overall. In parallel, Salikhov also competed in the first four rounds of the Blancpain Endurance Series for GT Corse by Rinaldi, sharing a Ferrari 458 Italia GT3 alongside Marco Seefried and Vadim Kogay.

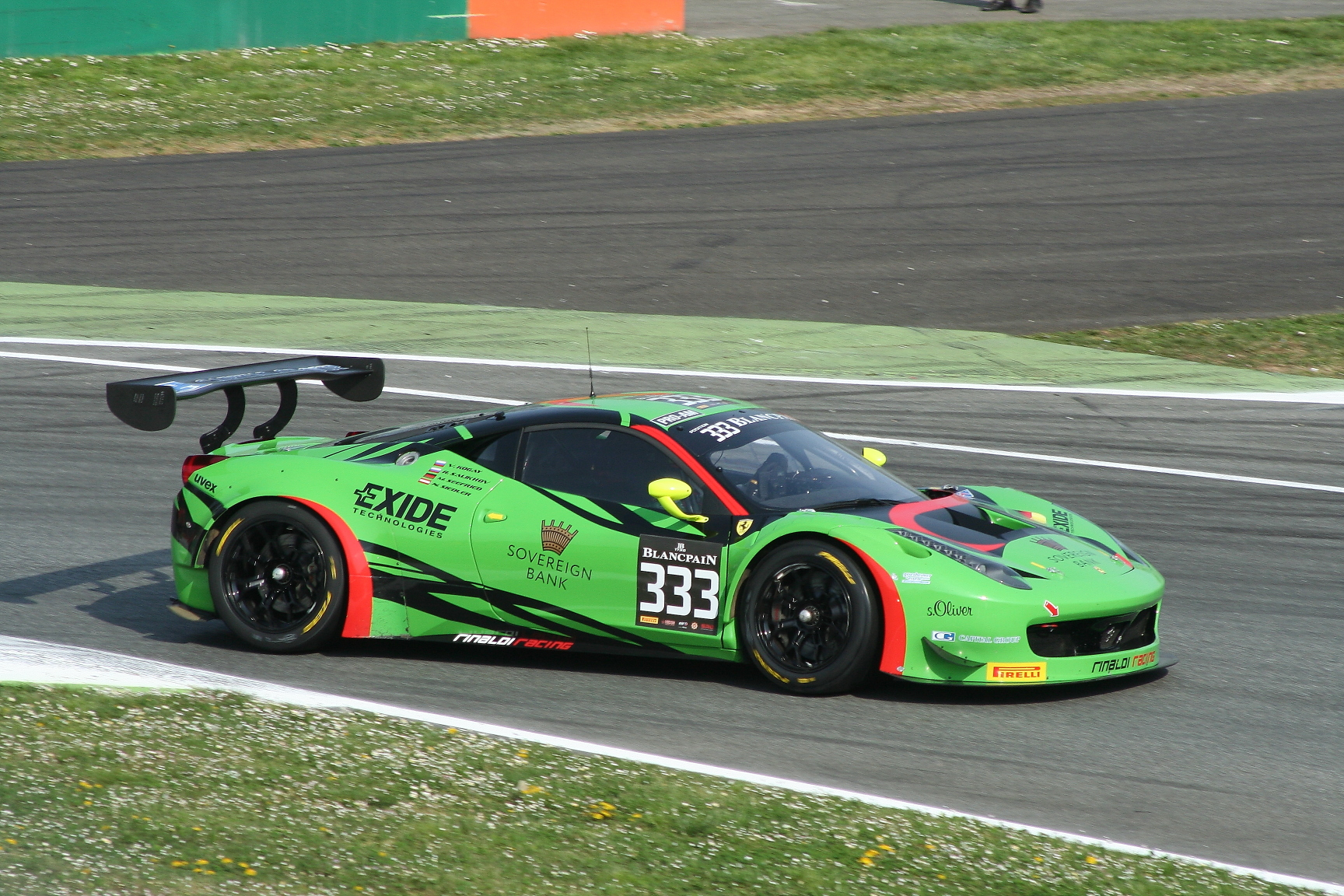
Salikhov secured an overall podium in his Pro-Am car at Monza during the 2015 Blancpain Endurance Series.

Continuing with Rinaldi for 2015, Salikhov and Norbert Siedler finished a historic second overall at Monza—also a Pro-Am win—in a season in which he went back and forth between the Pro and Pro-Am classes, ultimately finishing 12th in the latter's standings. After being downgraded to FIA Bronze ahead of 2016, Salikhov continued in the Blancpain GT Series Endurance Cup, dabbling between the Pro and Am classes, and scoring two podiums in the latter class at Spa and the Nürburgring. During 2016, Salikhov also made his Blancpain GT Series Sprint Cup debut with the team at Barcelona, winning the main race in Pro-Am. Remaining in the Blancpain GT Series Endurance Cup the following year, Salikhov made his full-season debut in Pro-Am, scoring a lone podium at Barcelona to finish 10th in points. During 2017, Salikhov also made one-off appearances with the team in International GT Open and the Blancpain GT Series Sprint Cup, as well as finishing second overall at the Gulf 12 Hours.

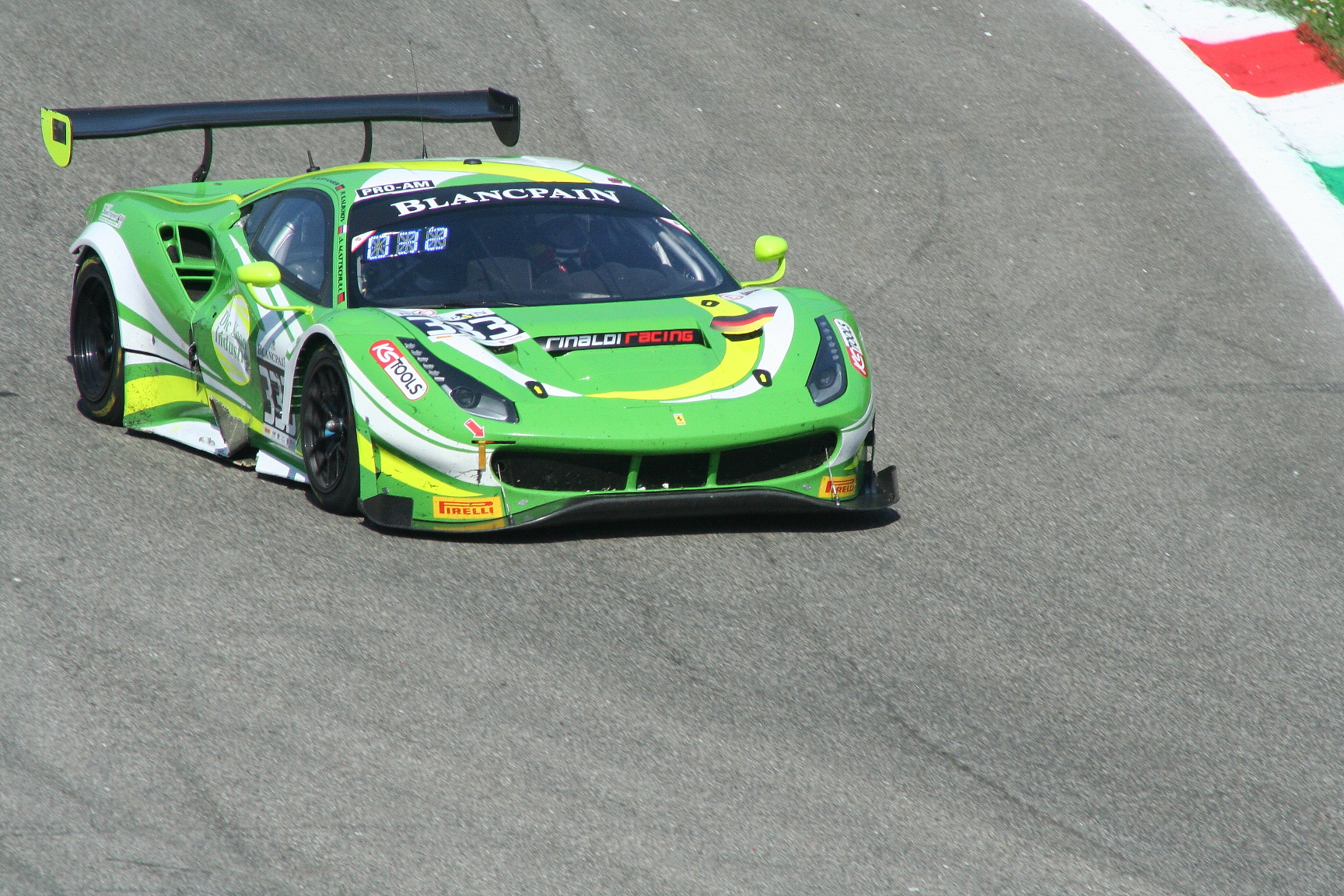
Salikhov's Rinaldi Racing Ferrari 488 GT3 at Monza in 2018.

Joining Alexander Mattschull for their second full-time season in Pro-Am the following year, Salikhov took class wins at Monza and the 24 Hours of Spa to secure a third-place points finish in class. During 2018, Salikhov also raced with Rinaldi for the majority of the International GT Open season, as well as making another one-off appearance in the Blancpain GT Series Sprint Cup at the Nürburgring, winning the main race in Pro-Am. At the end of the year, Salikhov also represented Russia in the FIA GT Nations Cup alongside Denis Bulatov, finishing fourth in the only edition of the race. In 2019, Salikhov continued with Rinaldi for a dual programme in both the Blancpain GT Series Endurance Cup and Blancpain GT World Challenge Europe. Racing in the Silver Cup in the former, Salikhov scored a lone podium at Barcelona to take seventh in points, whereas in the latter, he and David Perel clinched three Pro-Am wins and two other podiums to secure runner-up honours in the class standings. During 2019, Salikhov also represented Russia at the FIA Motorsport Games GT Cup discipline, and won the Gulf 12 Hours overall for Attempto Racing together with Audi factory drivers Christopher Mies and Dries Vanthoor.

In 2020, Salikhov was set to return to Rinaldi for another dual campaign in the GT World Challenge Europe Endurance and Sprint Cups, but the campaign was called off when an unspecified driver picked up an injury before the season and Rinaldi withdrew its No. 888 Ferrari. Returning to racing in 2022, Salikhov raced in SMP GT4 Russia for Yadro Motorsport, finishing sixth in the standings on his debut year before clinching the series title the following year with three wins to his name. At the beginning of 2024, Salikhov joined Porsche-fielding Proton Huber Competition to compete at the Dubai 24 Hour, a race in which he finished second overall alongside Sergei Borisov, Sven Müller and Viktor Shaytar. Salikhov then returned to SMP GT4 Russia for most of the year, before reuniting with Rinaldi Racing to race in the Gulf 12 Hours. At the end of the year, Salikhov joined Mercedes outfit Winward Racing to compete in the 2024–25 Asian Le Mans Series alongside Gabriele Piana. In his first season in the series, Salikhov won race two at Sepang and scored maximum points at Dubai to secure a third-place points finish.

At the beginning of 2025, Salikhov also raced with Winward in the Middle East Trophy, securing two GT3 Pro-Am podiums en route to runner-up honours in points. For the rest of the year, Salikhov stuck with the German-American team for a full return to the GT World Challenge Europe Endurance and Sprint Cups as a Bronze Cup entry. In the Endurance Cup, Salikhov scored a pair of second-place finishes at Monza and at the 24 Hours of Spa en route to a fourth-place points finish on his return to the series. In the Sprint Cup, Salikhov scored a Bronze Cup win at Magny-Cours and three other podiums to also end the season fourth in the standings. At the end of the year, Salikhov continued with the team to race at the Gulf 12 Hours, in which he finished fifth overall with Marvin Dienst and Piana.

The following year, Salikhov returned to Winward for the UAE leg of the 24H Series Middle East, as well as making a one-off appearance for BMW-affiliated Team WRT at the Abu Dhabi finale of the 2025–26 Asian Le Mans Series, finishing second in race one. For the rest of 2026, Salikhov continued with Winward for another dual campaign in the GT World Challenge Europe Endurance and Sprint Cups. At Monza, Salikhov was on course for a repeat of 2015, the No. 87 Mercedes running second overall when Dienst was taken out in a late crash. For the rest of the Endurance Cup season, Salikhov took three Bronze class podiums to secure fourth in the end-of-year standings. In the Sprint Cup, Salikhov took class wins at Misano and Magny-Cours to secure runner-up honours. At the end of the year, Salikhov continued with Winward to race in the GT3 class of the 2026–27 Asian Le Mans Series.

== Racing record ==
=== Racing career summary ===
Season	Series	Team	Races	Wins	Poles	F/Laps	Podiums	Points	Position
2013	V de V Michelin Endurance Series – GT	Rinaldi Racing							
2013	6 Hours of Vallelunga – GT Cup	Sportec Motorsport	1	1	0	0	1	—N/a	**1st**
2014	Dubai 24 Hour – 997	MRS GT-Racing	1	0	0	0	0	—N/a	DNF
2014	Porsche Carrera Cup Italy	Sportec Motorsport	14	0	0	0	0	10	14th
2014	Blancpain Endurance Series – Pro-Am	GT Corse by Rinaldi	4	0	0	0	0	0	NC
2015	Blancpain Endurance Series – Pro-Am	Rinaldi Racing	2	1	0	0	1	31	12th
2015	Blancpain Endurance Series – Pro	Rinaldi Racing	3	0	0	0	0	6	24th
2015	24H Series – SP2	Sportec Motorsport	1	0	0	0	0	0	NC
2016	Blancpain GT Series Endurance Cup	Rinaldi Racing	5	0	0	0	0	0	NC
2016	Blancpain GT Series Endurance Cup – Am	Rinaldi Racing	2	0	0	0	1	39	11th
2016	Intercontinental GT Challenge – Am	Rinaldi Racing	1	0	0	0	0	0	NC
2016	Blancpain GT Series Sprint Cup – Pro-Am	Rinaldi Racing	2	1	0	0	2	31	5th
2017	Blancpain GT Series Endurance Cup – Pro-Am	Rinaldi Racing	5	0	0	0	1	42	10th
2017	Intercontinental GT Challenge	Rinaldi Racing	1	0	0	0	0	0	NC
2017	Blancpain GT Series Sprint Cup – Pro-Am	Rinaldi Racing	2	0	0	0	1	16	8th
2017	International GT Open – Am	Rinaldi Racing	2	1	0	0	2	0	NC†
2017	Gulf 12 Hours – GT3 Pro	Rinaldi Racing	1	0	0	0	1	—N/a	**2nd**
2018	Blancpain GT Series Endurance Cup – Pro-Am	Rinaldi Racing	5	2	1	0	2	85	**3rd**
2018	International GT Open – Pro-Am	Rinaldi Racing	8	0	0	0	2	22	9th
2018	International GT Open – Am	Rinaldi Racing	2	1	1	1	2	10	11th
2018	Blancpain GT Series Sprint Cup – Pro-Am	Rinaldi Racing	2	1	0	0	1	16.5	5th
2018	FIA GT Nations Cup	Team Russia	1	0	0	0	0	—N/a	4th
2019	Blancpain GT Series Endurance Cup – Silver	Rinaldi Racing	5	0	0	0	1	46	7th
2019	Blancpain GT World Challenge Europe – Pro-Am	Rinaldi Racing	10	3	3	0	5	102.5	**2nd**
2019	Italian GT Championship Endurance Cup – GT3 Pro	Rinaldi Racing	1	1	0	0	1	20	9th
2019	FIA Motorsport Games GT Cup	Team Russia	1	0	0	0	0	—N/a	7th
2019	Gulf 12 Hours – GT3 Pro	Attempto Racing	1	1	0	0	1	—N/a	**1st**
2022	SMP GT4 Russia	Yadro Motorsport	9	0	0	0	3	138	6th
2023	SMP GT4 Russia	Yadro Motorsport	12	3	0	2	5	249	**1st**
2023–24	Middle East Trophy – GT3 Pro-Am	Proton Huber Competition	1	0	0	0	1	36	NC
2024	SMP GT4 Russia	Yadro Motorsport	12	0	0	0	4	166	7th
2024	Gulf 12 Hours – Pro-Am	Rinaldi Racing	1	0	0	0	0	—N/a	5th
2024–25	Asian Le Mans Series – GT	Winward Racing	6	1	1	0	2	65	**3rd**
2025	Middle East Trophy – GT3	Winward Racing	2	0	0	0	2	56	**2nd**
2025	GT World Challenge Europe Endurance Cup – Bronze	Winward Racing	5	0	0	0	2	61	4th
2025	GT World Challenge Europe Sprint Cup – Bronze	Winward Racing	8	1	0	0	4	63	4th
2025	Intercontinental GT Challenge	Winward Racing	1	0	0	0	0	0	NC
2025	Gulf 12 Hours – GT3 Pro	Winward Racing	1	0	0	0	0	—N/a	5th
2025–26	24H Series Middle East – GT3	Winward Racing	2	0	0	0	0	0	NC
2025–26	Asian Le Mans Series – GT	Team WRT	2	0	0	0	1	0	NC†
2026	GT World Challenge Europe Endurance Cup – Bronze	Winward Racing	5	0	0	0	3	76	4th
2026	Intercontinental GT Challenge	Winward Racing	1	0	0	0	0	0	NC
2026	GT World Challenge Europe Sprint Cup – Bronze	Winward Racing	8	2	0	2	6	83	**2nd**
2026	SMP GT4 Russia – Am	Yadro Motorsport							
2026–27	Asian Le Mans Series – GT3	Winward Racing						*	*

=== Complete GT World Challenge Europe results ===
==== GT World Challenge Europe Endurance Cup ====
Year	Team	Car	Class	1	2	3	4	5	6	7	Pos.	Points
2014	GT Corse by Rinaldi	Ferrari 458 Italia GT3	Pro-Am	MNZ; 29†	SIL; 29	LEC; 36†	SPA; 6H; 44	SPA; 12H; 52	SPA; 24H; Ret	NÜR	NC	0
2015	Rinaldi Racing	Ferrari 458 Italia GT3	Pro-Am	MNZ; 2			SPA; 6H; 37	SPA; 12H; 27	SPA; 24H; 24		12th	31
2015	Rinaldi Racing	Ferrari 458 Italia GT3	Pro		SIL; 7	LEC; Ret				NÜR; 14	24th	6
2016	Rinaldi Racing	Ferrari 458 Italia GT3	Pro	MNZ; 17	SIL; Ret	LEC; 42					NC	0
2016	Rinaldi Racing	Ferrari 488 GT3	Am				SPA; 6H; 54	SPA; 12H; 45	SPA; 24H; 36	NÜR; 36	11th	39
2017	Rinaldi Racing	Ferrari 488 GT3	Pro-Am	MNZ; 16	SIL; DSQ	LEC; 19	SPA; 6H; 54	SPA; 12H; 56	SPA; 24H; Ret	CAT; 20	10th	42
2018	Rinaldi Racing	Ferrari 488 GT3	Pro-Am	MNZ; 18	SIL; 41	LEC; Ret	SPA; 6H; 18	SPA; 12H; 21	SPA; 24H; 15	CAT; 27	3rd	85
2019	Rinaldi Racing	Ferrari 488 GT3	Silver	MNZ; 25	SIL; 13	LEC; 16	SPA; 6H; 57	SPA; 12H; 61	SPA; 24H; Ret	CAT; 8	7th	46
2025	Winward Racing	Mercedes-AMG GT3 Evo	Bronze	LEC; 33	MNZ; 14	SPA; 6H; 38	SPA; 12H; 26	SPA; 24H; 17	NÜR; 41	CAT; Ret	4th	61
2026	Winward Racing	Mercedes-AMG GT3 Evo	Bronze	LEC; 22	**MNZ**; 35†	SPA; 6H; 40	SPA; 12H; 31	SPA; 24H; 21	NÜR; 25	ALG; 18	4th	76

==== GT World Challenge Europe Sprint Cup ====
(key) (Races in bold indicate pole position) (Races in italics indicate fastest lap)

Year	Team	Car	Class	1	2	3	4	5	6	7	8	9	10	Pos.	Points
2016	Rinaldi Racing	Ferrari 488 GT3	Pro-Am	MIS; QR	MIS; CR	BRH; QR	BRH; CR	NÜR; QR	NÜR; CR	HUN; QR	HUN; CR	CAT; QR; 23	CAT; CR; 22	5th	31
2017	Rinaldi Racing	Ferrari 488 GT3	Pro-Am	MIS; QR	MIS; CR	BRH; QR	BRH; CR	ZOL; QR	ZOL; CR	HUN; QR	HUN; CR	NÜR; QR; 24	NÜR; CR; 28	8th	16
2018	Rinaldi Racing	Ferrari 488 GT3	Pro-Am	ZOL; QR	ZOL; CR	BRH; QR	BRH; CR	MIS; QR	MIS; CR	HUN; QR	HUN; CR	NÜR; QR; Ret	NÜR; CR; 10	5th	16.5
2019	Rinaldi Racing	Ferrari 488 GT3	Pro-Am	BRH; 1; 13	BRH; 2; 16	MIS; 1; 12	MIS; 2; 22	ZAN; 1; 25	ZAN; 2; 15	**NÜR**; **1**; 20	**NÜR**; **2**; 24	**HUN**; **1**; 25	HUN; 2 Ret	2nd	102.5
2025	Winward Racing	Mercedes-AMG GT3 Evo	Bronze	ZAN; 1 Ret	ZAN; 2; 30	MIS; 1; 27	MIS; 2; 31	MAG; 1; 27	MAG; 2; 23	VAL; 1; 16	VAL; 2; 34			4th	63
2026	Winward Racing	Mercedes-AMG GT3 Evo	Bronze	MIS; 1; 23	MIS; 2; 24	MAG; 1; 17	MAG; 2; 36	ZAN; 1; 24	ZAN; 2; 34	CAT; 1; 17	CAT; 2; 23			2nd	83

=== Complete Asian Le Mans Series results ===
(key) (Races in bold indicate pole position) (Races in italics indicate fastest lap)

Year	Team	Class	Car	Engine	1	2	3	4	5	6	Pos.	Points
2024–25	Winward Racing	GT	Mercedes-AMG GT3 Evo	Mercedes-AMG M159 6.2 L V8	SEP; 1; 5	SEP; 2; 1	DUB; 1 Ret	DUB; 2; 2	**ABU**; **1** Ret	ABU; 2; 10	3rd	65
2025–26	Team WRT	GT	BMW M4 GT3 Evo	BMW S58B30T0 3.0 L Turbo I6	SEP; 1	SEP; 2	DUB; 1	DUB; 2	ABU; 1; 2	ABU; 2; 7	NC†	0†
2026–27	Winward Racing	GT	Mercedes-AMG GT3 Evo	Mercedes-AMG M159 6.2 L V8	LEC; 1; 8	LEC; 2; 4	JER; 1	JER; 2	ALG; 1	ALG; 2	5th*	16*
