= 2023 Russian Circuit Racing Series =

Circuit Racing Series

The 2023 SMP Russian Circuit Racing Series was the tenth season of the Russian Circuit Racing Series, organized by SMP Racing. It was the ninth season with TCR class cars. In 2023, the competition's held in eight classes: Touring, Touring Light, Super Production, S1600, GT4, CN, Historic Touring Cup and Time Attack Unlimited.

== Teams and drivers ==
Yokohama is the official tyre supplier.

=== Touring / TCR Russian Touring Car Championship ===
Team	Car	No.	Drivers	Rounds
(Russia) Lukoil Racing Team	Hyundai i30 N TCR	2	(Russia) Aleksandr Smolyar	2–5, 7–8
(Russia) Lukoil Racing Team	Hyundai i30 N TCR	10	(Russia) Vladimir Atoev	1
(Russia) Lukoil Racing Team	Hyundai Elantra N TCR	10	(Russia) Vladimir Atoev	2–5, 7–8
(Russia) Lukoil Racing Team	Hyundai Elantra N TCR	7	(Russia) Alexey Dudukalo	1
(Russia) Lukoil Racing Team	Audi RS 3 LMS TCR	71	(Russia) Andrey Maslennikov	All (7)
(Russia) TAIF Motorsport / AG Team	Cupra León Competición TCR	4	(Russia) Dmitry Bragin	All
(Russia) TAIF Motorsport / AG Team	Audi RS 3 LMS TCR (2021)	17	(Russia) Pavel Kalmanovich	All
(Russia) LADA Sport Rosneft	LADA Vesta NG TCR	8	(Russia) Ivan Chubarov	All
(Russia) LADA Sport Rosneft	LADA Vesta NG TCR	11	(Russia) Kirill Ladygin	All
(Russia) LADA Sport Rosneft	LADA Vesta NG TCR	12	(Russia) Vladimir Sheshenin	All
(Russia) Alga Motorsport	Audi RS 3 LMS TCR	18	(Russia) Rustam Fatkhutdinov	All
(Russia) Rumos Racing	Hyundai i30 N TCR	47	(Russia) Lev Tolkachev	All

Key
Teams claimed for team points.

=== Super Production ===
All teams and drivers are Russian-registered.

Team	Car	No.	Drivers	Rounds
Sofit Racing Team	Subaru BRZ	1	Samvel Iskoyants	1–2
Sofit Racing Team	Subaru BRZ	78	Vadim Antipov	1–2
Pastushkov Pavel	Subaru BRZ	87	Pavel Pastushkov	5, 7
Delrus Lubsar Neva Motorsport	Honda Civic FN2	3	Roman Golikov	All (7)
Delrus Lubsar Neva Motorsport	Honda Civic EP3	13	Igor Samsonov	7
Delrus Lubsar Neva Motorsport	Honda Civic EP3	55	Petr Plotnikov	4
Delrus Lubsar Neva Motorsport	Honda Civic EP3	88	Nikolai Vikhansky	All
Mazda High Power	Mazda 3	9	Ilya Obzhigalov	7
Mazda High Power	Mazda 3	29	Mikhail Mileshin	1
Mazda High Power	Mazda 3	96	Anton Nadeshkin	1–3
LADA Sport Rosneft	LADA Vesta NG	30	Mikhail Mytyaev	All
LADA Sport Rosneft	LADA Vesta NG	53	Leonid Panfilov	All
LECAR Racing Team	LADA Vesta NG	50	Maksim Turiev	All
Garmash Aleksandr	Volkswagen Scirocco	80	Aleksandr Garmash	1, 7–8

Key
Teams claimed for team points.

=== Touring Light ===
All teams and drivers are Russian-registered.

Team	Car	No.	Drivers	Rounds
Innostage AG Team	Audi A1 1.5T	51	Egor Sanin	3-8
Innostage AG Team	Audi A1 1.5T	5	Stanislav Novikov	3-8
Innostage AG Team	Kia Rio X-Line	100	Stanislav Novikov	1
Innostage AG Team	Kia Rio X-Line	88	Ilya Sidorov	All (7)
PSM Team 80	Hyundai Solaris II	7	Aleksandr Salnikov	1, 3-7
PSM Team 80	Hyundai Solaris	66	Aleksey Savin	1, 3-7
Bragin Racing Team	Skoda Fabia	10	Andrey Petukhov	3-8
Bragin Racing Team	Skoda Fabia	11	Mikhail Simonov	3-8
Bragin Racing Team	Volkswagen Polo LB	11	Mikhail Simonov	1
SpeedWay Ranch	Peugeot 208 R2	19	Dmitry Shishko	1, 4
B-Tuning Pro Racing	Volkswagen Polo HB	20	Artemy Melnikov	1, 4-7
Rumos Racing	Kia Rio X-Line 1.4T	32	Aleksandr Chachava	1, 3-7
Kuzma's Mother Racing Team	Kia Rio X-Line 1.6T	33	Dmitry Dudarev	All
Kuzma's Mother Racing Team	Kia Rio X-Line 1.6	17	Vladimir Cherevan	7
Rally Academy	Audi A1 1.4T	17	Vladimir Cherevan	1, 3-6
Rally Academy	Audi A1 1.4T	12	Nikolay Karamyshev	All
Rally Academy	Audi A1 1.4T	21	Daniil Kovalev	3-4, 7
Rally Academy	Volkswagen Polo LB 1.4T	49	Ivan Tverdokhlebov	All
Tutaev Team	Volkswagen Polo LB 1.4T	37	Denis Karelin	1, 3-5, 7–8
Tutaev Team	Volkswagen Polo LB 1.4T	44	Samvel Iskoyants	3, 7
Tutaev Team	Volkswagen Polo LB 1.4T	80	Oleg Kravtsov	1, 3-5
FAS Motorsport	Audi A1 1.4T	55	Nikita Galishev	All
FAS Motorsport	Audi A1 1.4T	89	Artem Fridman	All

Key
Teams claimed for team points.

=== S1600 ===
All teams and drivers are Russian-registered.

Team	Car	No.	Drivers	Rounds
Rumos Racing	Kia Rio X-Line	3	Daniil Kharashun	All (7)
Rumos Racing	Kia Rio X-Line	70	Ilya Rodkin	4
Rumos Racing	Kia Rio X-Line	27	Roman Scherbakov	7–8
Alga Motorsport	Kia Rio X-Line	27	Roman Scherbakov	3-6
Alga Motorsport	LADA Vesta	9	Rustam Fatkhutdinov	3
Alga Motorsport	Hyundai Solaris	95	Rustam Fatkhutdinov	8
Alga Motorsport	Kia Rio	15	Artem Volkov	1, 3-6
Alga Motorsport	Hyundai Solaris	16	Tatiana Eliseeva	All
Alga Motorsport	Hyundai Solaris	24	Kirill Zinoviev	All
Alga Motorsport	Hyundai Solaris	111	Nikita Dubinin	3-4
Alga Motorsport	Hyundai Solaris	210	Vladimir Lobachev	All
Buyanov Timofey	Kia Rio	18	Timofey Buyanov	All
Kalimullin Azat	LADA Granta FL	28	Azat Kalimullin	3-4, 6-8
Kobenko Aleksandr	LADA Granta FL	45	Aleksandr Kobenko	7
Tutaev Team	Kia Rio	54	Mikhail Pochenkov	3, 8
Tutaev Team	Kia Rio	79	Alersandr Pochenkov	1, 3
STK MAK Titan	Kia Rio	79	Alersandr Pochenkov	5, 7
Parus Motorsport	Kia Rio	56	Vasiliy Korablev	All
Dralin Mikhail	LADA Granta	58	Mikhail Dralin	All
Innostage AG Team	Kia Rio X-Line	78	Artem Antonov	All
Nesterov Aleksandr	Kia Rio	68	Aleksandr Nesterov	7

Key
Teams claimed for team points.

=== GT4 ===
All teams and drivers are Russian-registered.

Team	Car	No.	Drivers	Rounds
Capital Racing Team Motor Sharks	Mercedes-AMG GT4	1	Anton Nemkin	All (4)
Capital Racing Team Motor Sharks	Mercedes-AMG GT4	13	Denis Remenyako	All
Iskra Motorsport	Toyota Supra GT4	5	Sergey Titarenko	All
Iskra Motorsport	Toyota Supra GT4	37	Andrey Solukovtsev	All
Iskra Motorsport	Toyota Supra GT4	97	Dmitry Kharlanchev	3-4
Rally Academy	Porsche 718 Cayman GT4 Clubsport	7	Ilya Gorbatsky	4, 7
Spora GT	Toyota Supra GT4	41	Ilya Gorbatsky	1
Spora GT	Toyota Supra GT4	51	Dmitriy Gvazava	1
Spora GT	Toyota Supra GT4	59	Vladimir Charchiyan	3-4, 7
Denisov Aleksey	Toyota Supra GT4	8	Aleksey Denisov	7
di Marco Andrea	Toyota Supra GT4	9	Andrea di Marco	7
Yadro Motorsport	Mercedes-AMG GT4	10	Maksim Kizilov	1, 3-4
Yadro Motorsport	Mercedes-AMG GT4	44	Sergey Stolyarov	All
Yadro Motorsport	Mercedes-AMG GT4	88	Rinat Salikhov	All
Motorsport Promotion	BMW M4 GT4	26	Marat Khairov	1
Carville Racing	Mercedes-AMG GT4	27	Andrey Radoshnov	1, 3
Ural Logistics VRC	Mercedes-AMG GT4	87	Danila Ivanov	All
Rumos Racing	Toyota Supra GT4 EVO	46	Svetlana Gorbunova	4, 7
Anastasiadis Dmitry	Toyota Supra GT4	47	Dmitry Anastasiadis	All
RSCar Motorsport	Mercedes-AMG GT4	63	Vadim Mescheryakov	3-4, 7
Pogosyan David	Toyota Supra GT4	74	David Pogosyan	7
Goncharov Andrey	Toyota Supra GT4	77	Andrey Goncharov	1, 3
Goncharov Andrey	KTM X-Bow GT4	77	Andrey Goncharov	4, 7
BMW Time	BMW M4 GT4	98	Oleg Semenov	All

Key
Teams claimed for team points.

=== Sports prototype CN ===
Team	Car	No.	Drivers	Rounds
SDYUSTSH for motorsports	Legends 600	4	Vladimir Gorlach	4, 7
SDYUSTSH for motorsports	Legends 600	5	Sergey Lapitsky	All (5)
Dobrynina Tatiana	527 Shortcut	7	Tatiana Dobrynina	2, 4, 7
Viktorov Artem	527 Shortcut	8	Artem Viktorov	All
Zubenko Vitaly	Mitjet 2L	9	Vitaly Zubenko	7
CSKA	527 Shortcut	31	Aleksey Khairov	7
CSKA	527 Shortcut	10	Sergey Ievlev	2, 5—7
Magnum Rcacing	527 Shortcut	10	Sergey Ievlev	4
Magnum Rcacing	527 Shortcut	11	Aleksey Chernov	All
Magnum Rcacing	527 Shortcut	18	Sergey Peregudov	All
Magnum Rcacing	527 Shortcut	31	Aleksey Khairov	2, 4—6
Dudarev Motorsport	527 Shortcut	55	Aleksandr Dudarev	All
Dudarev Motorsport	527 Shortcut	78	Yriy Sunyaev	All
Dudarev Motorsport	527 Shortcut	12	Sergey Aglish	4—6
Aglish Sergey	527 Shortcut	12	Sergey Aglish	7
Balchug Racing	527 Shortcut	12	Sergey Aglish	2
Balchug Racing	527 Shortcut	16	Stanislav Sidoruk	All
Balchug Racing	527 Shortcut	21	Kirill Kirakozov	All
Balchug Racing	527 Shortcut	96	Dmitry Eliseev	All
Leontiev Artem	527 Shortcut	13	Artem Leontiev	5—7
Zakharevsky Konstantin	Mitjet 2L	17	Konstantin Zakharevsky	7
Gromov Vladislav	527 Shortcut	19	Andrey Gromov	All
SMP Racing Gazprom for kids	Mitjet 2L	22	Konstantin Sugrobov	All
Frolov Nikita	Mitjet 2L	24	Nikita Frolov	4, 7
Nipples Racing	527 Shortcut	26	Sergey Grishanov	7
Krekoten Eugeny	Mitjet 2L	27	Eugeny Krekoten	7
Vinopal Aleksandr	527 Shortcut	30	Aleksandr Vinopal	All
Karamyshev Dmitry	527 Shortcut	33	Dmitry Karamyshev	7
Karamyshev Dmitry	Legends 600	99	Dmitry Karamyshev	5
Russian ring	Legends 600	58	Efim Lev	4, 7
Akimenkov Artemy	527 Shortcut	61	Artemy Akimenkov	7
Savin Aleksey	Legends 600	66	Aleksey Savin	2, 4—5
Skorik Maksim	527 Shortcut	67	Maksim Skorik	All
Krumilov Stepan	527 Shortcut	69	Stepan Krumilov	2, 7
Kramar Motorsport	527 Shortcut	74	Igor Shunailov	2, 5—7
Nazarov Aleksandr	Legends 600	85	Aleksandr Nazarov	5—7
Boyarinova Ekaterina	527 Shortcut	88	Ekaterina Boyarinova	All
Kharchenko Semen	Mitjet 2L	99	Semen Kharchenko	4, 6—7
NRG Motorsport	527 Shortcut	117	Ekaterina Kapista	5, 7
Shutemov Aleksandr	527 Shortcut	160	Aleksandr Shutemov	4—7
Dostovalov Mikhail	527 Shortcut	777	Mikhail Dostovalov	2, 4—5, 7
Gerasimov Ivan	527 Shortcut	888	Ivan Gerasimov	2, 4—6

=== SMP Historic Touring Cup ===
Team	Car	No.	Drivers	Class	Rounds
Semenov Gleb	VAZ 2101	9	Gleb Semenov	2000+	2, 6-7
Khamidullin Almaz	VAZ 2107	10	Almaz Khamidullin	Zhiguli1600	7
Kirillov Denis	VAZ 2105	13	Denis Kirillov	Zhiguli1600	2, 4, 7
Rally Academy	VAZ 2101	17	Vladimir Cherevan	2000+	All (4)
Chu Vo Iga	VAZ 2105	26	Ivan Tarakanov	Zhiguli1600	All
Chu Vo Iga	VAZ 2105	33	Andrey Kozlov	Zhiguli1600	4-6
Chu Vo Iga	VAZ 2107	33	Andrey Kozlov	Zhiguli1600	2
Legacy Motorsport	Moskvich 412	28	Pavel Bondarenko	2000+	4-7
Legacy Motorsport	IZH 2715	43	Vladislav Shevel	2000+	2, 5-7
Legacy Motorsport	Moskvich 408IE	77	Vladislav Donets	2000+	All
Legacy Motorsport	Moskvich 408IE	800	Dmitry Kozlov	2000+	All
Tseplyaev Pavel	VAZ 2101	29	Pavel Tseplyaev	2000+	7
Puhlyakov Anton	VAZ 2107	44	Anastasia Puhlyakova	Zhiguli1600	2
Artyushin Andrey	VAZ 2101	54	Andrey Artyushin	2000+	2, 4
Kramar Motorsport	VAZ 2101	74	Igor Shunailov	Zhiguli1600	2, 4-6
Kutyaev Aleksey	VAZ 2105	79	Aleksey Kutyaev	Zhiguli1600	7
Tsygankov Andrey	VAZ 2107	81	Andrey Tsygankov	Zhiguli1600	2
Kurushin Maksim	VAZ 2101	83	Miksim Kurushin	Zhiguli1600	4-7
FAS Motorsport	VAZ 2101	89	Artem Fridman	Zhiguli1600	2
Smolyakov Roman	VAZ 2107	555	Roman Smolyakov	Zhiguli1600	7

=== SMP Time Attack Unlim ===
Team	Car	No.	Drivers	Rounds
Kalashnikov Vyacheslav	Chevrolet Corvette	6	Vyacheslav Kalashnikov	4
Innostage AG Team; SDUSTSH for Motorsport	Mitsubishi Lancer EVO9	8	Vladimir Gorlach	All (2)
VRC Team	Mercedes-AMG GT4	8	Aleksey Denisov	7
Speed Way Ranch	Audi RS 3 LMS TCR	19	Dmitry Shishko	7
Delrus Lubsar Neva Motorsport	Honda Civic	88	Nikolay Vikhanskiy	4
Gorbatenko Sergey	CUPRA León TCR	444	Sergey Gorbatenko	7

== Calendar and results ==
Calendar is presented on April 15 and includes 8 rounds.

Rnd.	Circuit	Date	Touring winner	SP winner	TL winner	S1600 winner	GT4 winner	CN winners	HTC winners	TAU winners
1	Sochi Autodrom, Sochi	21–23 April	R1: Kirill Ladygin; R2: Pavel Kalmanovich	R1: Mikhail Mityaev; R2: Nikolay Vikhansky	R1: Mikhail Simonov; R2: Nikolay Karamyshev	R1: Artem Antonov; R2: Vasiliy Korablev	R1: Danila Ivanov; R2: Rinat Salikhov; R3: Rinat Salikhov	not held	not held	not held
2	Smolensk Ring, Smolensk	19–21 May	R1: Dmitry Bragin; R2: Dmitry Bragin	R1: Leonid Panfilov; R2: Mikhail Mityaev	not held	not held	not held	R1: Shortcut: Aleksandr Dudarev; Legends: Sergey Lapitsky; Mitjet: No finishers R2: Shortcut: Aleksandr Dudarev; Legends: Sergey Lapitsky; Mitjet: Konstantin Sugrobov	R1: 2000+: Vladimir Cherevan; Zh1600: Andrey Kozlov; R2: 2000+: Vladimir Cherevan; Zh1600: Igor Shunailov	not held
3	Kazan Ring, Kazan	16–18 June	R1: Vladimir Atoev; R2: Dmitry Bragin	R1: Mikhail Mityaev; R2: Mikhail Mityaev	R1: Egor Sanin; R2: Egor Sanin	R1: Daniil Kharashun; R2: Kirill Zinoviev	R1: Danila Ivanov; R2: Rinat Salikhov; R3: Sergey Titarenko	not held	not held	not held
4	Igora Drive, Priozersk	7–9 July	R1: Aleksandr Smolyar; R2: Dmitry Bragin	R1: Leonid Panfilov; R2: Maksim Turiev	R1: Ilya Sidorov; R2: Nikolay Karamyshev	R1: Ilya Rodkin; R2: Daniil Kharashun	R1: Denis Remenyako; R2: Rinat Salikhov; R3: Danila Ivanov	R1: Shortcut: Aleksandr Dudarev; Legends: Aleksey Savin; Mitjet: Konstantin Sugrobov; R2: Shortcut: Kirill Kirakozov; Legends: Sergey Lapitsky; Mitjet: Semen Kharchenko	R1: 2000+: Vladimir Cherevan; Zh1600: Andrey Kozlov; R2: 2000+: Vladimir Cherevan; Zh1600: Andrey Kozlov	R1: Vyacheslav Kalashnikov; R2: Vladimir Gorlach
5	NRING Circuit, Bogorodsk	28–30 July	R1: Pavel Kalmanovich; R2: Ivan Chubarov	R1: Mikhail Mityaev; R2: Roman Golykov	R1: Mikhail Simonov; R2: Egor Sanin	R1: Artem Antonov; R2: Kirill Zinoviev	not held	R1: Shortcut: Andrey Gromov; Legends: Aleksandr Nazarov; Mitjet: Konstantin Sugrobov; R2: Shortcut: Aleksandr Dudarev; Legends: Sergey Lapitsky; Mitjet: No finishers	R1: 2000+: Vladimir Cherevan; Zh1600: Igor Shunailov; R2: 2000+: Dmitry Kozlov; Zh1600: Andrey Kozlov	not held
6	ADM Raceway, Moscow	18–20 August	not held	not held	R1: Mikhail Simonov; R2: Egor Sanin	R1: Daniil Kharashun; R2: Artem Antonov	not held	R1: Shortcut: Aleksandr Dudarev; Legends: Aleksandr Nazarov; Mitjet: Konstantin Sugrobov; R2: Shortcut: Andrey Gromov; Legends: Sergey Lapitsky; Mitjet: Konstantin Sugrobov	R1: 2000+: Vladimir Cherevan; Zh1600: Igor Shunailov; R2: 2000+: Vladimir Cherevan; Zh1600: Maksim Kurushin	not held
7	Moscow Raceway, Volokolamsk	8–10 September	R1: Aleksandr Smolyar; R2: Kirill Ladygin	R1: Roman Golykov; R2: Mikhail Mityaev	R1: Dmitry Dudarev; R2: Andrey Petukhov	R1: Kirill Zinoviev; R2: Timofey Buyanov	R1: Sergey Titarenko; R2: Sergey Titarenko; R3: Vadim Mescheryakov	R1: Shortcut: Aleksandr Dudarev; Legends: Sergey Lapitsky; Mitjet: Konstantin Sugrobov; R2: Shortcut: Andrey Gromov; Legends: Sergey Lapitsky; Mitjet: Konstantin Sugrobov	R1: 2000+: Vladimir Cherevan; Zh1600: Ivan Tarakanov; R2: 2000+: Dmitry Kozlov; Zh1600: Maksim Kurushin	R1: Sergey Gorbatenko; R2: Aleksey Denisov
8	Fort Grozny Autodrom, Grozny	6–8 October	R1: Ivan Chubarov; R2: Vladimir Sheshenin	R1: Roman Golykov; R2: Mikhail Mityaev	R1: Mikhail Simonov; R2: Andrey Petukhov	R1: Kirill Zinoviev; R2: Timofey Buyanov	not held	not held	not held	not held

== Championship standings ==
Scoring systems

Position	1st	2nd	3rd	4th	5th	6th	7th	8th	9th	10th	11th	12th	13th	14th	15th	PP	FL
Qualifacation	10	8	6	4	2												
Race 1 Points	30	23	19	16	14	12	10	8	7	6	5	4	3	2	1	**1**	1
Race 2 Points	25	20	16	13	11	10	9	8	7	6	5	4	3	2	1	**1**	1

=== Touring / TCR Russian Touring Car Championship ===
Pos.	Driver	SOC		SMO		KAZ		IGO		NRG		MSC		GRO		Pts.
1	(Russia) Dmitry Bragin	4	3	**1**	1	Ret	1	2	1	2	4	4	5	7	4	311
2	(Russia) Ivan Chubarov	2	4	8	6	3	5	**4**	7	6	1	2	4	**1**	5	269
3	(Russia) Aleksandr Smolyar			2	5	2	9	1	2	3	5	**1**	2	4	3	266
4	(Russia) Vladimir Atoev	**3**	2	7	8	1	3	5	5	5	2	3	7	6	9	240
5	(Russia) Pavel Kalmanovich	5	1	4	7	**6**	6	Ret	3	**1**	6	6	3	5	2	232
6	(Russia) Kirill Ladygin	1	Ret	6	2	4	10	3	6	8	10†	7	1	2	Ret	211
7	(Russia) Andrey Maslennikov	7	9	3	4	7	2	6	8	9	3	5	9	9	7	169
8	(Russia) Rustam Fatkhutdinov	8	5	5	3	9†	7	7	DSQ	4	7	10	8	3	6	161
9	(Russia) Vladimir Sheshenin	10	7	9	9	5	4	Ret	4	7	8	8	6	Ret	1	130
10	(Russia) Lev Tolkachev	9	8	10	10	8	8	8	9	10	9	9	10	8	8	100
11	(Russia) Aleksey Dudukalo	6	6													22
Pos.	Driver	SOC		SMO		KAZ		IGO		NRG		MSC		GRO		Pts.

Legend
Gold	Winner
Silver	Second place
Bronze	Third place
Green	Points classification
Blue	Non-points classification
Blue	Non-classified finish (NC)
Purple	Retired, not classified (Ret)
Red	Did not qualify (DNQ)
Red	Did not pre-qualify (DNPQ)
Black	Disqualified (DSQ)
White	Did not start (DNS)
White	Withdrew (WD)
White	Race cancelled (C)
Blank	Did not practice (DNP)
Blank	Did not arrive (DNA)
Blank	Excluded (EX)

**Bold** – Pole
Italics – Fastest Lap

† – Drivers did not finish the race, but were classified as they completed over 75% of the race distance.

==== Touring / TCR Russian Touring Car Championship Team's Standings ====
Pos.	Driver	SOC		SMO		KAZ		IGO		NRG		MSC		GRO		Pts.
1	(Russia) Lukoil Racing Team	3	2	2	4	1	3	1	2	3	2	1	2	4	3	546
1	(Russia) Lukoil Racing Team	6	6	3	5	2	9	5	5	5	5	3	7	6	9	546
2	(Russia) STK TAIF Motorsport	4	1	1	1	6	1	2	1	1	4	4	3	5	2	503
2	(Russia) STK TAIF Motorsport	5	3	4	7	Ret	6	Ret	3	2	6	6	5	7	4	503
3	(Russia) LADA Sport Rosneft	1	4	6	2	3	5	3	6	6	1	2	1	1	5	490
3	(Russia) LADA Sport Rosneft	2	Ret	8	6	4	10	4	7	8	10†	7	4	2	Ret	490
Pos.	Driver	SOC		SMO		KAZ		IGO		NRG		MSC		GRO		Pts.

=== Super Production ===
Pos.	Driver	SOC		SMO		KAZ		IGO		NRG		MSC		GRO		Pts.
1	Mikhail Mityaev	1	3	6	1	**1**	1	2	6	**1**	2	5	1	Ret	1	322
2	Roman Golykov	5	7	**3**	3	2	Ret	3	2	5	1	1	3	**1**	5	297
3	Leonid Panfilov	4	4	1	4	4	4	1	3	6	WD	**2**	5	2	3	267
4	Nikolay Vikhansky	2	1	2	5	3	3	6	5	3	5	4	2	3	4	265
5	Maksim Turiev	3	6	5	2	Ret	2	5	1	2	3	3	4	Ret	2	258
6	Samvel Iskoyants	**9**	5	4	7											56
7	Vadim Antipov	6	2	7	6											52
8	Pavel Pastushkov									4	4	7	6			47
9	Anton Nadeshkin	8	8	Ret	Ret	5	5									41
10	Petr Plotnikov							**4**	4							39
11	Aleksandr Garmash	7	Ret									6	7			37
12	Ilya Obzhigalov											6	8			18
13	Igor Samsonov											NC	NC			0
	Mikhail Mileshin	DNS	DNS													-
Pos.	Driver	SOC		SMO		KAZ		IGO		NRG		MSC		GRO		Pts.

Legend
Gold	Winner
Silver	Second place
Bronze	Third place
Green	Points classification
Blue	Non-points classification
Blue	Non-classified finish (NC)
Purple	Retired, not classified (Ret)
Red	Did not qualify (DNQ)
Red	Did not pre-qualify (DNPQ)
Black	Disqualified (DSQ)
White	Did not start (DNS)
White	Withdrew (WD)
White	Race cancelled (C)
Blank	Did not practice (DNP)
Blank	Did not arrive (DNA)
Blank	Excluded (EX)

**Bold** – Pole
Italics – Fastest Lap

† – Drivers did not finish the race, but were classified as they completed over 75% of the race distance.

==== Super Production Team's Standings ====
Pos.	Driver	SOC		SMO		KAZ		IGO		NRG		MSC		GRO		Pts.
1	LADA Sport Rosneft	1	3	1	1	1	1	1	3	1	2	2	1	2	1	589
1	LADA Sport Rosneft	4	4	6	4	4	4	2	6	6	WD	5	5	Ret	3	589
2	Lubsar Delrus Neva Motorsport	2	1	2	3	2	3	3	2	3	1	1	2	1	4	564
2	Lubsar Delrus Neva Motorsport	5	7	3	5	3	Ret	6	5	5	5	4	3	3	5	564
3	Sofit Racing Team	6	2	4	6											108
3	Sofit Racing Team	9	5	7	7											108
Pos.	Driver	SOC		SMO		KAZ		IGO		NRG		MSC		GRO		Pts.

=== Touring Light ===
Pos.	Driver	SOC		KAZ		IGO		NRG		ADM		MSC		GRO		Pts.
1	Mikhail Simonov	1	3	8	2	DSQ	4	1	DSQ	1	4	3	2	**1**	9	279
2	Egor Sanin			**1**	1	DSQ	5	Ret	1	4	1	2	3	4	2	237
3	Nikolay Karamyshev	2	1	4	9	DSQ	1	3	6	3	3	6	Ret	3	10	217
4	Andrey Petukhov			2	4	**DSQ**	2	7	2	**2**	9	4	1	8	1	216
5	Dmitry Dudarev	10	4	Ret	10	Ret	15	**2**	4	12	5	**1**	6	2	8	201
6	Stanislav Novikov	9	9	7	3	DSQ	3	5	5	14†	2	8	4	Ret	3	146
7	Artem Fridman	**6**	2	Ret	Ret	DSQ	6	4	Ret	5	8	5	10	5	6	142
8	Ilya Sidorov	8	5	15	8	1	7	Ret	9	6	7	7	Ret	7	5	135
9	Ivan Tverdokhlebov	4	7	16	6	DSQ	8	6	7	10	13	10	7	10	4	109
10	Oleg Kravtsov	14	6	3	7	7	9	9	8							80
11	Vladimir Cherevan	5	8	6	15	DSQ	10	8	11	9	10	12	13			74
12	Nikita Galishev	11	11	14	13	DSQ	11	10	12	Ret	11	11	8	6	7	69
13	Artemiy Melnikov	Ret	DNS			2	12	Ret	10	7	6	13	9			64
14	Denis Karelin	7	10	9	14	3	17	13	Ret			14	11	9	Ret	63
15	Aleksey Savin	3	DSQ	11	Ret	DSQ	Ret	Ret	3	8	15†	Ret	Ret			51
16	Aleksandr Chachava	Ret	12	10	12	4	16	11	13	13	14	17	Ret			43
17	Samvel Iskoyants			5	5							9	5			43
18	Aleksandr Salnikov	12	13	12	DSQ	Ret	13	12	14	11	12	15	14			32
19	Daniil Kovalev			13	11	6	DNS					16	12			24
20	Dmitry Shishko	13	Ret			5	14									19
Pos.	Driver	SOC		KAZ		IGO		NRG		ADM		MSC		GRO		Pts.

Legend
Gold	Winner
Silver	Second place
Bronze	Third place
Green	Points classification
Blue	Non-points classification
Blue	Non-classified finish (NC)
Purple	Retired, not classified (Ret)
Red	Did not qualify (DNQ)
Red	Did not pre-qualify (DNPQ)
Black	Disqualified (DSQ)
White	Did not start (DNS)
White	Withdrew (WD)
White	Race cancelled (C)
Blank	Did not practice (DNP)
Blank	Did not arrive (DNA)
Blank	Excluded (EX)

**Bold** – Pole
Italics – Fastest Lap

† – Drivers did not finish the race, but were classified as they completed over 75% of the race distance.

==== Touring Light Team's Standings ====
Pos.	Driver	SOC		KAZ		IGO		NRG		ADM		MSC		GRO		Pts.
1	Bragin Racing Team	1	3	2	2	DSQ	2	1	2	1	4	3	1	1	1	495
1	Bragin Racing Team			4	8	DSQ	4	7	DSQ	2	9	4	2	8	9	495
2	Innostage AG Team	8	5	1	1	DSQ	3	5	1	4	1	2	3	4	2	388
2	Innostage AG Team	9	9	15	8	DSQ	5	Ret	5	14†	2	7	Ret	Ret	3	388
3	Rally Academy	2	1	4	9	DSQ	1	3	6	3	3	6	7	3	4	318
3	Rally Academy	5	8	6	15	DSQ	10	8	11	9	10	10	Ret	10	10	318
4	FAS Motorsport	6	2	14	13	DSQ	6	4	12	5	8	5	8	5	6	222
4	FAS Motorsport	11	11	Ret	Ret	DSQ	11	10	Ret	Ret	11	11	10	6	7	222
5	Kuzma's Mother Racing Team	10	4	Ret	10	Ret	15	2	4	12	5	1	6	2	8	208
5	Kuzma's Mother Racing Team											12	13			208
Pos.	Driver	SOC		KAZ		IGO		NRG		ADM		MSC		GRO		Pts.

=== S1600 ===
Pos.	Driver	SOC		KAZ		IGO		NRG		ADM		MSC		GRO		Pts.
1	Artem Antonov	**1**	2	5	2	3	9	1	2	4	1	4	Ret	3	5	279
2	Daniil Kharashun	9	7	1	Ret	2	1	3	8	1	4	9	7	5	4	246
3	Kirill Zinoviev	3	10	3	1	5	5	9†	1	5	8	**1**	Ret	**1**	12	245
4	Vasiliy Korablev	4	1	2	3	4	8	2	7	2	3	5	3	4	11	239
5	Timofey Buyanov	8	9	4	8	8	2	6	4	3	6	2	1	7	1	216
6	Vladimir Lobachev	7	3	**Ret**	6	**10**	11	7	3	**6**	DSQ	7	4	2	2	202
7	Mikhail Dralin	2	6	6	5	7	3	**Ret**	6	9	5	8	DSQ	8	8	158
8	Aleksandr Pochenkov	5	8	7	7			4	5			6	2			100
9	Roman Scherbakov			8	10	11	10	10†	Ret	7	Ret	3	4	11	6	89
10	Tatiana Eliseeva	6	5	10	Ret	Ret	Ret	8	Ret	11	2	Ret	6	9	10	87
11	Artem Volkov	Ret	4	12	4	6	6	5	Ret	8	Ret					74
12	Azat Kalimullin			DNS	11	9	12			10	7	11	5	10	9	60
13	Ilya Rodkin					1	4									46
14	Rustam Fatkhutdinov			Ret	DNS									6	3	28
15	Mikhail Pochenkov			9	9									Ret	7	23
16	Nikita Dubinin			11	DSQ	Ret	7									14
17	Aleksandr Kobenko											10	Ret			6
-	Aleksandr Nesterov											DNS	DNS			-
Pos.	Driver	SOC		KAZ		IGO		NRG		ADM		MSC		GRO		Pts.

Legend
Gold	Winner
Silver	Second place
Bronze	Third place
Green	Points classification
Blue	Non-points classification
Blue	Non-classified finish (NC)
Purple	Retired, not classified (Ret)
Red	Did not qualify (DNQ)
Red	Did not pre-qualify (DNPQ)
Black	Disqualified (DSQ)
White	Did not start (DNS)
White	Withdrew (WD)
White	Race cancelled (C)
Blank	Did not practice (DNP)
Blank	Did not arrive (DNA)
Blank	Excluded (EX)

**Bold** – Pole
Italics – Fastest Lap

† – Drivers did not finish the race, but were classified as they completed over 75% of the race distance.

=== SMP GT4 Russia ===
Pos.	Driver	SOC			KAZ			IGO			MSC			Pts.
1	Rinat Salikhov	2	2	1	4	1	4	5	1	4	7	5	5	249
2	Sergey Titarenko	7	Ret	13	6	Ret	1	4	3	3	1	1	3	188
3	Danila Ivanov	**1**	Ret	4	**1**	6	12	3	Ret	1	11	7	8	187
4	Denis Remenyako	6	1	2	3	7	3	1	DSQ	12	3	4	4	175
5	Vadim Mescheryakov				2	Ret	12	10	2	11	**4**	2	1	148
6	Andrey Solukovtsev	Ret	Ret	9	5	3	9	7	6	5	5	9	7	125
7	Sergey Stolyarov	4	7	12	8	Ret	5	8	5	2	Ret	6	12	121
8	Anton Nemkin	10	EX	EX	7	2	2	**2**	4	14✝	12	Ret	11	119
9	Oleg Semenov	11	5	Ret	9	4	7	11	Ret	6	6	8	6	96
10	David Pogosyan										2	3	2	62
11	Andrey Radoshnov	9	4	6	10	8	6							60
12	Andrey Goncharov	5	3	11	Ret	DNS	DNS	15	Ret	9	9	Ret	DNS	59
13	Vladimir Charchiyan				11	5	11	6	7	8	Ret	13	14	59
14	Dmitry Anastasiadis	13	8	7	Ret	DNS	8	14	9	Ret	Ret	10	9	50
15	Maksim Kizilov	12	14	5	Ret	DNS	DNS	9	11	7				41
16	Ilya Gorbatskiy	14	6	10				12	Ret	DNS	Ret	11	10	35
17	Dmitry Gvazava	3	9	8										34
18	Marat Khairov	8	10	3										30
19	Dmitry Kharlanchev				12	9	10	16	8	13				26
20	Svetlana Gorbunova							13	10	10	10	12	Ret	25
21	Andrea di Marco										8	15	15	10
22	Aleksey Denisov										13	14	13	8
Pos.	Driver	SOC			KAZ			IGO			MSC			Pts.

Legend
Gold	Winner
Silver	Second place
Bronze	Third place
Green	Points classification
Blue	Non-points classification
Blue	Non-classified finish (NC)
Purple	Retired, not classified (Ret)
Red	Did not qualify (DNQ)
Red	Did not pre-qualify (DNPQ)
Black	Disqualified (DSQ)
White	Did not start (DNS)
White	Withdrew (WD)
White	Race cancelled (C)
Blank	Did not practice (DNP)
Blank	Did not arrive (DNA)
Blank	Excluded (EX)

**Bold** – Pole
Italics – Fastest Lap

† – Drivers did not finish the race, but were classified as they completed over 75% of the race distance.

==== SMP GT4 Russia Team's Standings ====
Pos.	Driver	SOC			KAZ			IGO			MSC			Pts.
1	Yadro Motorsport	2	1	1	4	1	4	5	1	2	7	5	5	390
1	Yadro Motorsport	4	7	12	8	Ret	5	8	5	4	Ret	6	12	390
2	Iskra Motorsport	7	Ret	9	5	3	1	4	3	3	1	1	3	316
2	Iskra Motorsport	Ret	Ret	13	6	Ret	9	7	6	5	5	9	7	316
3	Capital Racing Team Motor Sharks	6	4	2	3	2	2	1	4	12	3	4	4	294
3	Capital Racing Team Motor Sharks	10	EX	EX	7	7	3	2	DSQ	14†	12	Ret	11	294
4	Spora GT	3	6	8	11	5	11	6	7	8	Ret	13	14	113
4	Spora GT	14	9	10										113
Pos.	Driver	SOC			KAZ			IGO			MSC			Pts.
