= 2017 Gulf 12 Hours =

7th Gulf 12 Hours endurance race

Race details
Date	14–16 December 2017
Official name	Gulf 12 Hours
Location	Yas Island, Abu Dhabi, UAE
Course	Permanent circuit 5.412 km (3.363 mi)
Distance	Race; 12 hours
- Qualifying

Pole
Driver	(Italy) Davide Rigon	Kessel Racing
Time	2:09.450
- Race After 6 Hours

Fastest lap
Driver	(Australia) Josh Burdon	Graff
Time	2:08.161 (on lap 71)

Podium
First	(Poland) Michał Broniszewski (Spain) Miguel Molina (Italy) Davide Rigon	Kessel Racing
Second	(Russia) Rinat Salikhov (Germany) Marco Seefried (Austria) Norbert Siedler	Rinaldi Racing
Third	(Oman) Ahmad Al Harthy (United Kingdom) Tom Jackson (United Kingdom) Euan McKay	Oman Racing Team
- Race After 12 Hours

Fastest lap
Driver	(Australia) Josh Burdon	Graff
Time	2:06.422 (on lap 89)

Podium
First	(Poland) Michał Broniszewski (Spain) Miguel Molina (Italy) Davide Rigon	Kessel Racing
Second	(Russia) Rinat Salikhov (Germany) Marco Seefried (Austria) Norbert Siedler	Rinaldi Racing
Third	(France) François Hériau (France) Jean-Baptiste Lahaye (France) Matthieu Lahaye	Ultimate

The 2017 Gulf 12 Hours was the seventh edition of the Gulf 12 Hours held at Yas Marina Circuit on 14–16 December 2017. The race was contested with LMP3 prototypes, GT3-spec cars, GTX cars and GT4-spec cars.

== Entry list ==
The official entry list consisted of 26 cars, including 7 in LMP3 prototype, 10 in GT3 and 8 in GTX.

LMP3
Team	Car	Engine	No.	Drivers	Class
(France) Graff	Ligier JS P3	Nissan VK50VE 5.0 L V8	1	(Australia) John Corbet	PA
(France) Graff	Ligier JS P3	Nissan VK50VE 5.0 L V8	1	(Australia) Neale Muston	PA
(France) Graff	Ligier JS P3	Nissan VK50VE 5.0 L V8	1	(Australia) James Winslow	PA
(France) Graff	Ligier JS P3	Nissan VK50VE 5.0 L V8	6	(Australia) Josh Burdon	PA
(France) Graff	Ligier JS P3	Nissan VK50VE 5.0 L V8	6	(Australia) Ricky Capo	PA
(France) Graff	Ligier JS P3	Nissan VK50VE 5.0 L V8	6	(France) Franck Gauvin	PA
(France) Graff	Ligier JS P3	Nissan VK50VE 5.0 L V8	6	(China) Chao Yin Wei	PA
(France) Graff	Ligier JS P3	Nissan VK50VE 5.0 L V8	9	(Australia) Scott Andrews	PA
(France) Graff	Ligier JS P3	Nissan VK50VE 5.0 L V8	9	(France) Adrien Chila	PA
(France) Graff	Ligier JS P3	Nissan VK50VE 5.0 L V8	9	(France) Alexandre Cougnaud	PA
(France) Graff	Ligier JS P3	Nissan VK50VE 5.0 L V8	9	(France) Eric Trouillet	PA
(France) Ultimate	Ligier JS P3	Nissan VK50VE 5.0 L V8	17	(France) François Hériau	PA
(France) Ultimate	Ligier JS P3	Nissan VK50VE 5.0 L V8	17	(France) Jean-Baptiste Lahaye	PA
(France) Ultimate	Ligier JS P3	Nissan VK50VE 5.0 L V8	17	(France) Matthieu Lahaye	PA
(United Kingdom) United Autosports	Ligier JS P3	Nissan VK50VE 5.0 L V8	21	(United Kingdom) Bonamy Grimes	PA
(United Kingdom) United Autosports	Ligier JS P3	Nissan VK50VE 5.0 L V8	21	(United Kingdom) Johnny Mowlem	PA
(United Kingdom) United Autosports	Ligier JS P3	Nissan VK50VE 5.0 L V8	21	(United Kingdom) Tony Wells	PA
(United Kingdom) United Autosports	Ligier JS P3	Nissan VK50VE 5.0 L V8	22	(United Kingdom) Shaun Lynn	G
(United Kingdom) United Autosports	Ligier JS P3	Nissan VK50VE 5.0 L V8	22	(United States) James McGuire	G
(United Kingdom) United Autosports	Ligier JS P3	Nissan VK50VE 5.0 L V8	22	(United Kingdom) Richard Meins	G
(United Kingdom) United Autosports	Ligier JS P3	Nissan VK50VE 5.0 L V8	23	(United Kingdom) Mike Benham	PA
(United Kingdom) United Autosports	Ligier JS P3	Nissan VK50VE 5.0 L V8	23	(United States) Patrick Byrne	PA
(United Kingdom) United Autosports	Ligier JS P3	Nissan VK50VE 5.0 L V8	23	(United States) Guy Cosmo	PA
(United Kingdom) United Autosports	Ligier JS P3	Nissan VK50VE 5.0 L V8	23	(Turkey) Salih Yoluç	PA
GT3
Team	Car	Engine	No.	Drivers	Class
(Switzerland) Kessel Racing	Ferrari 488 GT3	Ferrari 3.9 L Twin-Turbo V8	11	(Poland) Michał Broniszewski	P
(Switzerland) Kessel Racing	Ferrari 488 GT3	Ferrari 3.9 L Twin-Turbo V8	11	(Spain) Miguel Molina	P
(Switzerland) Kessel Racing	Ferrari 488 GT3	Ferrari 3.9 L Twin-Turbo V8	11	(Italy) Davide Rigon	P
(Switzerland) Kessel Racing	Ferrari 488 GT3	Ferrari 3.9 L Twin-Turbo V8	77	(Italy) Sergio Pianezzola	PA
(Switzerland) Kessel Racing	Ferrari 488 GT3	Ferrari 3.9 L Twin-Turbo V8	77	(Italy) Andrea Piccini	PA
(Switzerland) Kessel Racing	Ferrari 488 GT3	Ferrari 3.9 L Twin-Turbo V8	77	(Italy) Claudio Schiavoni	PA
(Thailand) Kessel Racing TP12 HubAuto	Ferrari 488 GT3	Ferrari 3.9 L Twin-Turbo V8	39	(Thailand) Piti Bhirombhakdi	PA
(Thailand) Kessel Racing TP12 HubAuto	Ferrari 488 GT3	Ferrari 3.9 L Twin-Turbo V8	39	(Taiwan) Morris Chen	PA
(Thailand) Kessel Racing TP12 HubAuto	Ferrari 488 GT3	Ferrari 3.9 L Twin-Turbo V8	39	(Australia) Nick Foster	PA
(Thailand) Kessel Racing TP12 HubAuto	Ferrari 488 GT3	Ferrari 3.9 L Twin-Turbo V8	39	(Italy) Giorgio Roda	PA
(Germany) SPS Automotive Performance	Mercedes-AMG GT3	Mercedes-AMG M159 6.2 L V8	20	(Switzerland) Iradj Alexander	PA
(Germany) SPS Automotive Performance	Mercedes-AMG GT3	Mercedes-AMG M159 6.2 L V8	20	(France) Antonin Borga	PA
(Germany) SPS Automotive Performance	Mercedes-AMG GT3	Mercedes-AMG M159 6.2 L V8	20	(France) Alexandre Coigny	PA
(United Arab Emirates) GP Extreme	Renault R.S. 01 F GT3	Nissan VR38DETT 3.8 L V6	27	(Ivory Coast) Frederic Fatien	PA
(United Arab Emirates) GP Extreme	Renault R.S. 01 F GT3	Nissan VR38DETT 3.8 L V6	27	(Germany) Roald Goethe	PA
(United Arab Emirates) GP Extreme	Renault R.S. 01 F GT3	Nissan VR38DETT 3.8 L V6	27	(United Kingdom) Stuart Hall	PA
(United Arab Emirates) GP Extreme	Renault R.S. 01 F GT3	Nissan VR38DETT 3.8 L V6	28	(South Africa) Jordan Grogor	P
(United Arab Emirates) GP Extreme	Renault R.S. 01 F GT3	Nissan VR38DETT 3.8 L V6	28	(Belgium) Jurgen Smet	P
(United Arab Emirates) GP Extreme	Renault R.S. 01 F GT3	Nissan VR38DETT 3.8 L V6	28	(France) Jean-Pierre Valentini	P
(Germany) Rinaldi Racing	Ferrari 488 GT3	Ferrari 3.9 L Twin-Turbo V8	33	(Russia) Rinat Salikhov	P
(Germany) Rinaldi Racing	Ferrari 488 GT3	Ferrari 3.9 L Twin-Turbo V8	33	(Germany) Marco Seefried	P
(Germany) Rinaldi Racing	Ferrari 488 GT3	Ferrari 3.9 L Twin-Turbo V8	33	(Austria) Norbert Siedler	P
(France) AKKA ASP Team	Mercedes-AMG GT3	Mercedes-AMG M159 6.2 L V8	87	(France) Jean-Luc Beaubelique	PA
(France) AKKA ASP Team	Mercedes-AMG GT3	Mercedes-AMG M159 6.2 L V8	87	(France) Jérôme Policand	PA
(France) AKKA ASP Team	Mercedes-AMG GT3	Mercedes-AMG M159 6.2 L V8	87	(France) Benjamin Ricci	PA
(France) AKKA ASP Team	Mercedes-AMG GT3	Mercedes-AMG M159 6.2 L V8	87	(France) Mauro Ricci	PA
(United Arab Emirates) Dragon Racing	Ferrari 458 Italia GT3	Ferrari 4.5 L V8	88	(United Kingdom) Greg Caton	G
(United Arab Emirates) Dragon Racing	Ferrari 458 Italia GT3	Ferrari 4.5 L V8	88	(United Kingdom) Ollie Hancock	G
(United Arab Emirates) Dragon Racing	Ferrari 458 Italia GT3	Ferrari 4.5 L V8	88	(United Kingdom) John Hartshorne	G
(United Arab Emirates) Dragon Racing	Ferrari 458 Italia GT3	Ferrari 4.5 L V8	88	(South Africa) David Perel	G
Oman Racing Team	Aston Martin V12 Vantage GT3	Aston Martin 6.0 L V12	97	(Oman) Ahmad Al Harthy	PA
Oman Racing Team	Aston Martin V12 Vantage GT3	Aston Martin 6.0 L V12	97	(United Kingdom) Tom Jackson	PA
Oman Racing Team	Aston Martin V12 Vantage GT3	Aston Martin 6.0 L V12	97	(United Kingdom) Euan McKay	PA
(Germany) Attempto Racing	Lamborghini Huracán GT3	Lamborghini 5.2 L V10	99	(Turkey) Ali Capan	P
(Germany) Attempto Racing	Lamborghini Huracán GT3	Lamborghini 5.2 L V10	99	(Austria) Clemens Schmid	P
(Germany) Attempto Racing	Lamborghini Huracán GT3	Lamborghini 5.2 L V10	99	(Spain) Isaac Tutumlu	P
GTX
Team	Car	Engine	No.	Drivers	Class
(Germany) MRS GT-Racing	Porsche 991 GT3 Cup	Porsche 4.0 L Flat-6	14	(Argentina) Norberto Fontana	GTX
(Germany) MRS GT-Racing	Porsche 991 GT3 Cup	Porsche 4.0 L Flat-6	14	(Argentina) Esteban Gini	GTX
(Germany) MRS GT-Racing	Porsche 991 GT3 Cup	Porsche 4.0 L Flat-6	14	(Argentina) Lucas Colombo Russell	GTX
(Germany) MRS GT-Racing	Porsche 991 GT3 Cup	Porsche 4.0 L Flat-6	15	(Germany) Georg Braun	GTX
(Germany) MRS GT-Racing	Porsche 991 GT3 Cup	Porsche 4.0 L Flat-6	15	(Belgium) Glenn van Parijs	GTX
(Germany) MRS GT-Racing	Porsche 991 GT3 Cup	Porsche 4.0 L Flat-6	15	(Australia) Max Twigg	GTX
(Germany) MRS GT-Racing	Porsche 991 GT3 Cup	Porsche 4.0 L Flat-6	15	(Germany) Siegfried Venema	GTX
(United Kingdom) Generation AMR Super Racing	Aston Martin V8 Vantage GT4	Aston Martin 4.7 L V8	44	(United Kingdom) Matthew George	GTX
(United Kingdom) Generation AMR Super Racing	Aston Martin V8 Vantage GT4	Aston Martin 4.7 L V8	44	(United Kingdom) James Holder	GTX
(United Kingdom) Generation AMR Super Racing	Aston Martin V8 Vantage GT4	Aston Martin 4.7 L V8	44	(United Kingdom) Steve Tandy	GTX
(Italy) Target Racing	Lamborghini Huracán Super Trofeo	Lamborghini 5.2 L V10	46	(United Arab Emirates) Karim Al Azhari	GTX
(Italy) Target Racing	Lamborghini Huracán Super Trofeo	Lamborghini 5.2 L V10	46	(Netherlands) Jan Lammers	GTX
(Italy) Target Racing	Lamborghini Huracán Super Trofeo	Lamborghini 5.2 L V10	46	(Thailand) Sarun Sereethoranakul	GTX
(United Kingdom) Slidesports	Porsche 991 GT3 Cup	Porsche 4.0 L Flat-6	56	(United Kingdom) Nigel Armstrong	GTX
(United Kingdom) Slidesports	Porsche 991 GT3 Cup	Porsche 4.0 L Flat-6	56	(United Kingdom) David Fairbrother	GTX
(United Kingdom) Slidesports	Porsche 991 GT3 Cup	Porsche 4.0 L Flat-6	56	(United Kingdom) Graeme Mundy	GTX
(San Marino) GDL Racing	Lamborghini Huracán Super Trofeo	Lamborghini 5.2 L V10	70	(Italy) Mario Cordoni	GTX
(San Marino) GDL Racing	Lamborghini Huracán Super Trofeo	Lamborghini 5.2 L V10	70	(United Kingdom) Stephen Liquorish	GTX
(San Marino) GDL Racing	Lamborghini Huracán Super Trofeo	Lamborghini 5.2 L V10	70	(South Korea) Rick Yoon	GTX
(San Marino) GDL Racing	Lamborghini Huracán Super Trofeo	Lamborghini 5.2 L V10	71	(New Zealand) Andrew Higgins	GTX
(San Marino) GDL Racing	Lamborghini Huracán Super Trofeo	Lamborghini 5.2 L V10	71	(United States) Jim Michaelian	GTX
(San Marino) GDL Racing	Lamborghini Huracán Super Trofeo	Lamborghini 5.2 L V10	71	(Italy) Roberto Rayneri	GTX
(Italy) Villorba Corse	Maserati GranTurismo MC GT4	Maserati 4.7 L V8	93	(Spain) Jon Aizpurua	GTX
(Italy) Villorba Corse	Maserati GranTurismo MC GT4	Maserati 4.7 L V8	93	(Italy) Manuela Gostner	GTX
(Italy) Villorba Corse	Maserati GranTurismo MC GT4	Maserati 4.7 L V8	93	(Sweden) Christian Kinch	GTX
(Italy) Villorba Corse	Maserati GranTurismo MC GT4	Maserati 4.7 L V8	93	(Sweden) Tommy Lindroth	GTX

Icon	Class
P	Pro
PA	Pro-Am
G	Gentleman
GTX	GTX 1
GTX	GTX 2
GTX	GTX 3

== Results ==
=== Results after 6 hours ===
Class winners denoted in bold.

Pos	Class	No.	Team / Entrant	Drivers	Chassis	Laps	Time/Retired
Pos	Class	No.	Team / Entrant	Drivers	Engine	Laps	Time/Retired
1	**GT Pro**	**11**	**(Switzerland) Kessel Racing**	**(Poland) Michał Broniszewski (Spain) Miguel Molina (Italy) Davide Rigon**	**Ferrari 488 GT3**	**145**	**6:00:31.302**
1	**GT Pro**	**11**	**(Switzerland) Kessel Racing**	**(Poland) Michał Broniszewski (Spain) Miguel Molina (Italy) Davide Rigon**	**Ferrari 3.9 L Twin-Turbo V8**	**145**	**6:00:31.302**
2	GT Pro	33	(Germany) Rinaldi Racing	(Russia) Rinat Salikhov (Germany) Marco Seefried (Austria) Norbert Siedler	Ferrari 488 GT3	145	+15.029
2	GT Pro	33	(Germany) Rinaldi Racing	(Russia) Rinat Salikhov (Germany) Marco Seefried (Austria) Norbert Siedler	Ferrari 3.9 L Twin-Turbo V8	145	+15.029
3	**GT Pro-Am**	**97**	**Oman Racing Team**	**(Oman) Ahmad Al Harthy (United Kingdom) Tom Jackson (United Kingdom) Euan McKay**	**Aston Martin V12 Vantage GT3**	**145**	**+23.478**
3	**GT Pro-Am**	**97**	**Oman Racing Team**	**(Oman) Ahmad Al Harthy (United Kingdom) Tom Jackson (United Kingdom) Euan McKay**	**Aston Martin 6.0 L V12**	**145**	**+23.478**
4	**LMP3 Pro-Am**	**17**	**(France) Ultimate**	**(France) François Hériau (France) Jean-Baptiste Lahaye (France) Matthieu Lahaye**	**Ligier JS P3**	**145**	**+37.674**
4	**LMP3 Pro-Am**	**17**	**(France) Ultimate**	**(France) François Hériau (France) Jean-Baptiste Lahaye (France) Matthieu Lahaye**	**Nissan VK50VE 5.0 L V8**	**145**	**+37.674**
5	LMP3 Pro-Am	22	(United Kingdom) United Autosports	(United Kingdom) Bonamy Grimes (United Kingdom) Johnny Mowlem (United Kingdom) Tony Wells	Ligier JS P3	145	+43.628
5	LMP3 Pro-Am	22	(United Kingdom) United Autosports	(United Kingdom) Bonamy Grimes (United Kingdom) Johnny Mowlem (United Kingdom) Tony Wells	Nissan VK50VE 5.0 L V8	145	+43.628
6	GT Pro-Am	77	(Switzerland) Kessel Racing	(Italy) Sergio Pianezzola (Italy) Andrea Piccini (Italy) Claudio Schiavoni	Ferrari 488 GT3	144	+1 lap
6	GT Pro-Am	77	(Switzerland) Kessel Racing	(Italy) Sergio Pianezzola (Italy) Andrea Piccini (Italy) Claudio Schiavoni	Ferrari 3.9 L Twin-Turbo V8	144	+1 lap
7	LMP3 Pro-Am	24	(United Kingdom) United Autosports	(United Kingdom) Mike Benham (United States) Patrick Byrne (United States) Guy Cosmo (Turkey) Salih Yoluç	Ligier JS P3	144	+1 lap
7	LMP3 Pro-Am	24	(United Kingdom) United Autosports	(United Kingdom) Mike Benham (United States) Patrick Byrne (United States) Guy Cosmo (Turkey) Salih Yoluç	Nissan VK50VE 5.0 L V8	144	+1 lap
8	GT Pro-Am	39	(Thailand) Kessel Racing TP12 HubAuto	(Thailand) Piti Bhirombhakdi (Taiwan) Morris Chen (Australia) Nick Foster (Italy) Giorgio Roda	Ferrari 488 GT3	143	+2 laps
8	GT Pro-Am	39	(Thailand) Kessel Racing TP12 HubAuto	(Thailand) Piti Bhirombhakdi (Taiwan) Morris Chen (Australia) Nick Foster (Italy) Giorgio Roda	Ferrari 3.9 L Twin-Turbo V8	143	+2 laps
9	GT Pro-Am	20	(Germany) SPS Automotive Performance	(Switzerland) Iradj Alexander (France) Antonin Borga (France) Alexandre Coigny	Mercedes-AMG GT3	143	+2 laps
9	GT Pro-Am	20	(Germany) SPS Automotive Performance	(Switzerland) Iradj Alexander (France) Antonin Borga (France) Alexandre Coigny	Mercedes-AMG M159 6.2 L V8	143	+2 laps
10	LMP3 Pro-Am	6	(France) Graff	(Australia) Josh Burdon (Australia) Ricky Capo (France) Franck Gauvin (China) Chao Yin Wei	Ligier JS P3	143	+2 laps
10	LMP3 Pro-Am	6	(France) Graff	(Australia) Josh Burdon (Australia) Ricky Capo (France) Franck Gauvin (China) Chao Yin Wei	Nissan VK50VE 5.0 L V8	143	+2 laps
11	GT Pro	99	(Germany) Attempto Racing	(Turkey) Ali Capan (Austria) Clemens Schmid (Spain) Isaac Tutumlu	Lamborghini Huracán GT3	143	+2 laps
11	GT Pro	99	(Germany) Attempto Racing	(Turkey) Ali Capan (Austria) Clemens Schmid (Spain) Isaac Tutumlu	Lamborghini 5.2 L V10	143	+2 laps
12	**GTX 1**	**46**	**(Italy) Target Racing**	**(United Arab Emirates) Karim Al Azhari (Netherlands) Jan Lammers (Thailand) Sarun Sereethoranakul**	**Lamborghini Huracán Super Trofeo**	**142**	**+3 laps**
12	**GTX 1**	**46**	**(Italy) Target Racing**	**(United Arab Emirates) Karim Al Azhari (Netherlands) Jan Lammers (Thailand) Sarun Sereethoranakul**	**Lamborghini 5.2 L V10**	**142**	**+3 laps**
13	**LMP3 Gentleman**	**23**	**(United Kingdom) United Autosports**	**(United Kingdom) Shaun Lynn (United States) James McGuire (United Kingdom) Richard Meins**	**Ligier JS P3**	**142**	**+3 laps**
13	**LMP3 Gentleman**	**23**	**(United Kingdom) United Autosports**	**(United Kingdom) Shaun Lynn (United States) James McGuire (United Kingdom) Richard Meins**	**Nissan VK50VE 5.0 L V8**	**142**	**+3 laps**
14	GT Pro-Am	27	(United Arab Emirates) GP Extreme	(Ivory Coast) Frederic Fatien (Germany) Roald Goethe (United Kingdom) Stuart Hall	Renault R.S. 01 F GT3	142	+3 laps
14	GT Pro-Am	27	(United Arab Emirates) GP Extreme	(Ivory Coast) Frederic Fatien (Germany) Roald Goethe (United Kingdom) Stuart Hall	Nissan VR38DETT 3.8 L V6	142	+3 laps
15	**GT Gentleman**	**88**	**(United Arab Emirates) Dragon Racing**	**(United Kingdom) Greg Caton (United Kingdom) Ollie Hancock (United Kingdom) John Hartshorne (South Africa) David Perel**	**Ferrari 458 Italia GT3**	**142**	**+3 laps**
15	**GT Gentleman**	**88**	**(United Arab Emirates) Dragon Racing**	**(United Kingdom) Greg Caton (United Kingdom) Ollie Hancock (United Kingdom) John Hartshorne (South Africa) David Perel**	**Ferrari 4.5 L V8**	**142**	**+3 laps**
16	GT Pro	28	(United Arab Emirates) GP Extreme	(South Africa) Jordan Grogor (Belgium) Jurgen Smet (France) Jean-Pierre Valentini	Renault R.S. 01 F GT3	142	+3 laps
16	GT Pro	28	(United Arab Emirates) GP Extreme	(South Africa) Jordan Grogor (Belgium) Jurgen Smet (France) Jean-Pierre Valentini	Nissan VR38DETT 3.8 L V6	142	+3 laps
17	**GTX 2**	**14**	**(Germany) MRS GT-Racing**	**(Argentina) Norberto Fontana (Argentina) Esteban Gini (Argentina) Lucas Colombo Russell**	**Porsche 991 GT3 Cup**	**142**	**+5 laps**
17	**GTX 2**	**14**	**(Germany) MRS GT-Racing**	**(Argentina) Norberto Fontana (Argentina) Esteban Gini (Argentina) Lucas Colombo Russell**	**Porsche 4.0 L Flat-6**	**142**	**+5 laps**
18	GTX 2	15	(Germany) MRS GT-Racing	(Germany) Georg Braun (Belgium) Glenn van Parijs (Australia) Max Twigg (Germany) Siegfried Venema	Porsche 991 GT3 Cup	141	+6 laps
18	GTX 2	15	(Germany) MRS GT-Racing	(Germany) Georg Braun (Belgium) Glenn van Parijs (Australia) Max Twigg (Germany) Siegfried Venema	Porsche 4.0 L Flat-6	141	+6 laps
19	LMP3 Pro-Am	9	(France) Graff	(Australia) Scott Andrews (France) Adrien Chila (France) Alexandre Cougnaud (France) Eric Trouillet	Ligier JS P3	141	+6 laps
19	LMP3 Pro-Am	9	(France) Graff	(Australia) Scott Andrews (France) Adrien Chila (France) Alexandre Cougnaud (France) Eric Trouillet	Nissan VK50VE 5.0 L V8	141	+6 laps
20	GTX 1	71	(San Marino) GDL Racing	(New Zealand) Andrew Higgins (United States) Jim Michaelian (Italy) Roberto Rayneri	Lamborghini Huracán Super Trofeo	134	+11 laps
20	GTX 1	71	(San Marino) GDL Racing	(New Zealand) Andrew Higgins (United States) Jim Michaelian (Italy) Roberto Rayneri	Lamborghini 5.2 L V10	134	+11 laps
21	GTX 2	56	(United Kingdom) Slidesports	(United Kingdom) Nigel Armstrong (United Kingdom) David Fairbrother (United Kingdom) Graeme Mundy	Porsche 991 GT3 Cup	133	+12 laps
21	GTX 2	56	(United Kingdom) Slidesports	(United Kingdom) Nigel Armstrong (United Kingdom) David Fairbrother (United Kingdom) Graeme Mundy	Porsche 4.0 L Flat-6	133	+12 laps
22	**GTX 3**	**44**	**(United Kingdom) Generation AMR Super Racing**	**(United Kingdom) Matthew George (United Kingdom) James Holder (United Kingdom) Steve Tandy**	**Aston Martin V8 Vantage GT4**	**132**	**+13 laps**
22	**GTX 3**	**44**	**(United Kingdom) Generation AMR Super Racing**	**(United Kingdom) Matthew George (United Kingdom) James Holder (United Kingdom) Steve Tandy**	**Aston Martin 4.7 L V8**	**132**	**+13 laps**
23	GTX 3	93	(Italy) Villorba Corse	(Spain) Jon Aizpurua (Italy) Manuela Gostner (Sweden) Christian Kinch (Sweden) Tommy Lindroth	Maserati GranTurismo MC GT4	129	+16 laps
23	GTX 3	93	(Italy) Villorba Corse	(Spain) Jon Aizpurua (Italy) Manuela Gostner (Sweden) Christian Kinch (Sweden) Tommy Lindroth	Maserati 4.7 L V8	129	+16 laps
24	GTX 1	70	(San Marino) GDL Racing	(Italy) Mario Cordoni (United Kingdom) Stephen Liquorish (South Korea) Rick Yoon	Lamborghini Huracán Super Trofeo	128	+17 laps
24	GTX 1	70	(San Marino) GDL Racing	(Italy) Mario Cordoni (United Kingdom) Stephen Liquorish (South Korea) Rick Yoon	Lamborghini 5.2 L V10	128	+17 laps
25	GT Pro-Am	87	(France) AKKA ASP Team	(France) Jean-Luc Beaubelique (France) Jérôme Policand (France) Benjamin Ricci (France) Mauro Ricci	Mercedes-AMG GT3	122	+23 laps
25	GT Pro-Am	87	(France) AKKA ASP Team	(France) Jean-Luc Beaubelique (France) Jérôme Policand (France) Benjamin Ricci (France) Mauro Ricci	Mercedes-AMG M159 6.2 L V8	122	+23 laps
26	LMP3 Pro-Am	1	(France) Graff	(Australia) John Corbet (Australia) Neale Muston (Australia) James Winslow	Ligier JS P3	103	Did not finish
26	LMP3 Pro-Am	1	(France) Graff	(Australia) John Corbet (Australia) Neale Muston (Australia) James Winslow	Nissan VK50VE 5.0 L V8	103	Did not finish

=== Final results ===
Class winners denoted in bold.

Pos	Class	No.	Team / Entrant	Drivers	Chassis	Laps	Time/Retired
Pos	Class	No.	Team / Entrant	Drivers	Engine	Laps	Time/Retired
1	**GT Pro**	**11**	**(Switzerland) Kessel Racing**	**(Poland) Michał Broniszewski (Spain) Miguel Molina (Italy) Davide Rigon**	**Ferrari 488 GT3**	**302**	**6:00:39.272**
1	**GT Pro**	**11**	**(Switzerland) Kessel Racing**	**(Poland) Michał Broniszewski (Spain) Miguel Molina (Italy) Davide Rigon**	**Ferrari 3.9 L Twin-Turbo V8**	**302**	**6:00:39.272**
2	GT Pro	33	(Germany) Rinaldi Racing	(Russia) Rinat Salikhov (Germany) Marco Seefried (Austria) Norbert Siedler	Ferrari 488 GT3	302	+55.737
2	GT Pro	33	(Germany) Rinaldi Racing	(Russia) Rinat Salikhov (Germany) Marco Seefried (Austria) Norbert Siedler	Ferrari 3.9 L Twin-Turbo V8	302	+55.737
3	**LMP3 Pro-Am**	**17**	**(France) Ultimate**	**(France) François Hériau (France) Jean-Baptiste Lahaye (France) Matthieu Lahaye**	**Ligier JS P3**	**302**	**+1:37.812**
3	**LMP3 Pro-Am**	**17**	**(France) Ultimate**	**(France) François Hériau (France) Jean-Baptiste Lahaye (France) Matthieu Lahaye**	**Nissan VK50VE 5.0 L V8**	**302**	**+1:37.812**
4	LMP3 Pro-Am	22	(United Kingdom) United Autosports	(United Kingdom) Bonamy Grimes (United Kingdom) Johnny Mowlem (United Kingdom) Tony Wells	Ligier JS P3	301	+1 lap
4	LMP3 Pro-Am	22	(United Kingdom) United Autosports	(United Kingdom) Bonamy Grimes (United Kingdom) Johnny Mowlem (United Kingdom) Tony Wells	Nissan VK50VE 5.0 L V8	301	+1 lap
5	LMP3 Pro-Am	24	(United Kingdom) United Autosports	(United Kingdom) Mike Benham (United States) Patrick Byrne (United States) Guy Cosmo (Turkey) Salih Yoluç	Ligier JS P3	301	+1 lap
5	LMP3 Pro-Am	24	(United Kingdom) United Autosports	(United Kingdom) Mike Benham (United States) Patrick Byrne (United States) Guy Cosmo (Turkey) Salih Yoluç	Nissan VK50VE 5.0 L V8	301	+1 lap
6	LMP3 Pro-Am	6	(France) Graff	(Australia) Josh Burdon (Australia) Ricky Capo (France) Franck Gauvin (China) Chao Yin Wei	Ligier JS P3	300	+2 laps
6	LMP3 Pro-Am	6	(France) Graff	(Australia) Josh Burdon (Australia) Ricky Capo (France) Franck Gauvin (China) Chao Yin Wei	Nissan VK50VE 5.0 L V8	300	+2 laps
7	**GT Pro-Am**	**77**	**(Switzerland) Kessel Racing**	**(Italy) Sergio Pianezzola (Italy) Andrea Piccini (Italy) Claudio Schiavoni**	**Ferrari 488 GT3**	**299**	**+3 laps**
7	**GT Pro-Am**	**77**	**(Switzerland) Kessel Racing**	**(Italy) Sergio Pianezzola (Italy) Andrea Piccini (Italy) Claudio Schiavoni**	**Ferrari 3.9 L Twin-Turbo V8**	**299**	**+3 laps**
8	GT Pro-Am	97	Oman Racing Team	(Oman) Ahmad Al Harthy (United Kingdom) Tom Jackson (United Kingdom) Euan McKay	Aston Martin V12 Vantage GT3	299	+3 laps
8	GT Pro-Am	97	Oman Racing Team	(Oman) Ahmad Al Harthy (United Kingdom) Tom Jackson (United Kingdom) Euan McKay	Aston Martin 6.0 L V12	299	+3 laps
9	GT Pro-Am	39	(Thailand) Kessel Racing TP12 HubAuto	(Thailand) Piti Bhirombhakdi (Taiwan) Morris Chen (Australia) Nick Foster (Italy) Giorgio Roda	Ferrari 488 GT3	298	+4 laps
9	GT Pro-Am	39	(Thailand) Kessel Racing TP12 HubAuto	(Thailand) Piti Bhirombhakdi (Taiwan) Morris Chen (Australia) Nick Foster (Italy) Giorgio Roda	Ferrari 3.9 L Twin-Turbo V8	298	+4 laps
10	GT Pro	99	(Germany) Attempto Racing	(Turkey) Ali Capan (Austria) Clemens Schmid (Spain) Isaac Tutumlu	Lamborghini Huracán GT3	297	+5 laps
10	GT Pro	99	(Germany) Attempto Racing	(Turkey) Ali Capan (Austria) Clemens Schmid (Spain) Isaac Tutumlu	Lamborghini 5.2 L V10	297	+5 laps
11	GT Pro-Am	20	(Germany) SPS Automotive Performance	(Switzerland) Iradj Alexander (France) Antonin Borga (France) Alexandre Coigny	Mercedes-AMG GT3	297	+5 laps
11	GT Pro-Am	20	(Germany) SPS Automotive Performance	(Switzerland) Iradj Alexander (France) Antonin Borga (France) Alexandre Coigny	Mercedes-AMG M159 6.2 L V8	297	+5 laps
12	LMP3 Pro-Am	9	(France) Graff	(Australia) Scott Andrews (France) Adrien Chila (France) Alexandre Cougnaud (France) Eric Trouillet	Ligier JS P3	296	+6 laps
12	LMP3 Pro-Am	9	(France) Graff	(Australia) Scott Andrews (France) Adrien Chila (France) Alexandre Cougnaud (France) Eric Trouillet	Nissan VK50VE 5.0 L V8	296	+6 laps
13	GT Pro	28	(United Arab Emirates) GP Extreme	(South Africa) Jordan Grogor (Belgium) Jurgen Smet (France) Jean-Pierre Valentini	Renault R.S. 01 F GT3	296	+6 laps
13	GT Pro	28	(United Arab Emirates) GP Extreme	(South Africa) Jordan Grogor (Belgium) Jurgen Smet (France) Jean-Pierre Valentini	Nissan VR38DETT 3.8 L V6	296	+6 laps
14	**GTX 1**	**46**	**(Italy) Target Racing**	**(United Arab Emirates) Karim Al Azhari (Netherlands) Jan Lammers (Thailand) Sarun Sereethoranakul**	**Lamborghini Huracán Super Trofeo**	**295**	**+7 laps**
14	**GTX 1**	**46**	**(Italy) Target Racing**	**(United Arab Emirates) Karim Al Azhari (Netherlands) Jan Lammers (Thailand) Sarun Sereethoranakul**	**Lamborghini 5.2 L V10**	**295**	**+7 laps**
15	**LMP3 Gentleman**	**23**	**(United Kingdom) United Autosports**	**(United Kingdom) Shaun Lynn (United States) James McGuire (United Kingdom) Richard Meins**	**Ligier JS P3**	**295**	**+7 laps**
15	**LMP3 Gentleman**	**23**	**(United Kingdom) United Autosports**	**(United Kingdom) Shaun Lynn (United States) James McGuire (United Kingdom) Richard Meins**	**Nissan VK50VE 5.0 L V8**	**295**	**+7 laps**
16	GT Pro-Am	27	(United Arab Emirates) GP Extreme	(Ivory Coast) Frederic Fatien (Germany) Roald Goethe (United Kingdom) Stuart Hall	Renault R.S. 01 F GT3	294	+8 laps
16	GT Pro-Am	27	(United Arab Emirates) GP Extreme	(Ivory Coast) Frederic Fatien (Germany) Roald Goethe (United Kingdom) Stuart Hall	Nissan VR38DETT 3.8 L V6	294	+8 laps
17	**GT Gentleman**	**88**	**(United Arab Emirates) Dragon Racing**	**(United Kingdom) Greg Caton (United Kingdom) Ollie Hancock (United Kingdom) John Hartshorne (South Africa) David Perel**	**Ferrari 458 Italia GT3**	**292**	**+10 laps**
17	**GT Gentleman**	**88**	**(United Arab Emirates) Dragon Racing**	**(United Kingdom) Greg Caton (United Kingdom) Ollie Hancock (United Kingdom) John Hartshorne (South Africa) David Perel**	**Ferrari 4.5 L V8**	**292**	**+10 laps**
18	**GTX 2**	**14**	**(Germany) MRS GT-Racing**	**(Argentina) Norberto Fontana (Argentina) Esteban Gini (Argentina) Lucas Colombo Russell**	**Porsche 991 GT3 Cup**	**290**	**+12 laps**
18	**GTX 2**	**14**	**(Germany) MRS GT-Racing**	**(Argentina) Norberto Fontana (Argentina) Esteban Gini (Argentina) Lucas Colombo Russell**	**Porsche 4.0 L Flat-6**	**290**	**+12 laps**
19	GTX 2	15	(Germany) MRS GT-Racing	(Germany) Georg Braun (Belgium) Glenn van Parijs (Australia) Max Twigg (Germany) Siegfried Venema	Porsche 991 GT3 Cup	287	+13 laps
19	GTX 2	15	(Germany) MRS GT-Racing	(Germany) Georg Braun (Belgium) Glenn van Parijs (Australia) Max Twigg (Germany) Siegfried Venema	Porsche 4.0 L Flat-6	287	+13 laps
20	GTX 1	70	(San Marino) GDL Racing	(Italy) Mario Cordoni (United Kingdom) Stephen Liquorish (South Korea) Rick Yoon	Lamborghini Huracán Super Trofeo	278	+22 laps
20	GTX 1	70	(San Marino) GDL Racing	(Italy) Mario Cordoni (United Kingdom) Stephen Liquorish (South Korea) Rick Yoon	Lamborghini 5.2 L V10	278	+22 laps
21	GTX 1	71	(San Marino) GDL Racing	(New Zealand) Andrew Higgins (United States) Jim Michaelian (Italy) Roberto Rayneri	Lamborghini Huracán Super Trofeo	277	+23 laps
21	GTX 1	71	(San Marino) GDL Racing	(New Zealand) Andrew Higgins (United States) Jim Michaelian (Italy) Roberto Rayneri	Lamborghini 5.2 L V10	277	+23 laps
22	**GTX 3**	**44**	**(United Kingdom) Generation AMR Super Racing**	**(United Kingdom) Matthew George (United Kingdom) James Holder (United Kingdom) Steve Tandy**	**Aston Martin V8 Vantage GT4**	**271**	**+29 laps**
22	**GTX 3**	**44**	**(United Kingdom) Generation AMR Super Racing**	**(United Kingdom) Matthew George (United Kingdom) James Holder (United Kingdom) Steve Tandy**	**Aston Martin 4.7 L V8**	**271**	**+29 laps**
23	GT Pro-Am	87	(France) AKKA ASP Team	(France) Jean-Luc Beaubelique (France) Jérôme Policand (France) Benjamin Ricci (France) Mauro Ricci	Mercedes-AMG GT3	270	+30 laps
23	GT Pro-Am	87	(France) AKKA ASP Team	(France) Jean-Luc Beaubelique (France) Jérôme Policand (France) Benjamin Ricci (France) Mauro Ricci	Mercedes-AMG M159 6.2 L V8	270	+30 laps
24	GTX 3	93	(Italy) Villorba Corse	(Spain) Jon Aizpurua (Italy) Manuela Gostner (Sweden) Christian Kinch (Sweden) Tommy Lindroth	Maserati GranTurismo MC GT4	260	+40 laps
24	GTX 3	93	(Italy) Villorba Corse	(Spain) Jon Aizpurua (Italy) Manuela Gostner (Sweden) Christian Kinch (Sweden) Tommy Lindroth	Maserati 4.7 L V8	260	+40 laps
25	GTX 2	56	(United Kingdom) Slidesports	(United Kingdom) Nigel Armstrong (United Kingdom) David Fairbrother (United Kingdom) Graeme Mundy	Porsche 991 GT3 Cup	160	Did not finish
25	GTX 2	56	(United Kingdom) Slidesports	(United Kingdom) Nigel Armstrong (United Kingdom) David Fairbrother (United Kingdom) Graeme Mundy	Porsche 4.0 L Flat-6	160	Did not finish
26	LMP3 Pro-Am	1	(France) Graff	(Australia) John Corbet (Australia) Neale Muston (Australia) James Winslow	Ligier JS P3	103	Did not finish
26	LMP3 Pro-Am	1	(France) Graff	(Australia) John Corbet (Australia) Neale Muston (Australia) James Winslow	Nissan VK50VE 5.0 L V8	103	Did not finish
