= 2016 Russian Circuit Racing Series =

Motor racing season

The 2016 Russian Circuit Racing Series was the third season of the Russian Circuit Racing Series, organized by SMP Racing. It was the second season with TCR class cars, competing alongside the Super 2000 TC2 and the Super Production cars.

== Teams and drivers ==
All teams and drivers were Russian-registered. Yokohama was the official tyre supplier.

=== Touring Absolute (United S2000) ===
- Are highlighted riders participating in TCR Russia.

Team	Car	No.	Drivers	Rounds
Touring (TCR Russian Touring Car Championship)
Lukoil Racing Team	SEAT León Cup Racer	1	Aleksey Dudukalo	All
Lukoil Racing Team	SEAT León Cup Racer	2	Roman Golikov	All
Lukoil Racing Team	SEAT León Cup Racer	12	Nikolay Karamyshev	All
STK TAIF Motorsport	SEAT León TCR	4	Dmitry Bragin	All
STK TAIF Motorsport	SEAT León TCR	87	Marat Sharapov	All
B-Tuning PRO Racing Team	SEAT Leon Supercopa Mk2	7	Oleg Kharuk	4-7
B-Tuning PRO Racing Team	SEAT Leon Supercopa Mk2	14	Klim Gavrilov	3
Timerkhan	SEAT Leon Supercopa Mk2	16	Rais Minnikhanov	7
Ralf-Car Team	Renault Megane RS	22	Andrey Artyushin	5-6
Neva Motorsport	SEAT León Cup Racer	23	Pavel Yashin	All
Innocenti-AMG Motorsport	SEAT León Cup Racer	25	Lev Tolkachev	All
STK Chingiskhan	SEAT León TCR	76	Irek Minnakhmetov	1-2, 4-7
Super Production
Neva Motorsport	Honda Civic Type R	31	Sergey Golubev	7
Shalunov Sergey	Lada Granta Cup	33	Sergey Shalunov	2
Mikhail Loboda	Mazda 3	37	Mikhail Loboda	1-2
Mikhail Loboda	Lada Granta Cup	37	Mikhail Loboda	3-5
Andrey Yushin	Honda Civic Type R	38	Andrey Yushin	1-6
Kurganskie Pritsepy	Lada Granta Cup	45	Aleksandr Tupitsyn	All
URT Racing; URT Subaru team Lukoil	Subaru BRZ URT	46	Efim Gantmakher	All
URT Racing; URT Subaru team Lukoil	Subaru BRZ URT	52	Maksim Chernev	All
URT Racing; URT Subaru team Lukoil	Subaru BRZ URT	62	Aleksey Titov	7
URT Racing; URT Subaru team Lukoil	Subaru BRZ URT	72	Vitaly Larionov	All
Innocenti-AMG Motorsport	Subaru BRZ URT	47	Denis Grigoryev	All
Lada Sport; Demfi Lada Sport	Lada Granta Cup	50	Vladislav Nezvankin	All
Lada Sport; Demfi Lada Sport	Lada Granta Cup	63	Maksim Simonov	All
Anton Badoev	BMW 320i E46	51	Anton Badoev	All
ALAS; DELPHI RHHCC Racing Team	Honda Civic Type R	54	Aleksandr Garmash	All
ALAS; DELPHI RHHCC Racing Team	Honda Civic Type R	55	Vladimir Strelchenko	1-5, 7
ALAS; DELPHI RHHCC Racing Team	Honda Civic Type R	96	Artem Kabakov	6-7

=== Touring Light ===
Team	Car	No.	Driver	Rounds
Lada Sport Rosneft	Lada Kalina NFR	1	Dmitry Bragin	All
Lada Sport Rosneft	Lada Kalina NFR	3	Mikhail Mityaev	All
SK «Suvar-Motorsport»	Renault Twingo Sport	2	Ilsur Akhmetvaleev	All
SK «Suvar-Motorsport»	Renault Twingo Sport	4	Ildar Rakhmatullin	1-6
SK «Suvar-Motorsport»	Renault Twingo Sport	8	Timur Boguslavskiy	7
B-Tuning Pro Racing Team	Volkswagen Polo R2 Mk5	8	Timur Boguslavskiy	4-5
B-Tuning Pro Racing Team	Volkswagen Polo R2 Mk5	14	Klim Gavrilov	5-6
B-Tuning Pro Racing Team	Volkswagen Polo R2 Mk5	22	Denis Bulatov	All
B-Tuning Pro Racing Team	Volkswagen Polo R2 Mk5	30	Andrey Nikolaev	1-2
B-Tuning Pro Racing Team	Volkswagen Polo R2 Mk5	83	Andrey Sevastianov	3-4, 6-7
PSM-Team80	Ford Fiesta Mk6	10	Rodion Shushakov	1, 3
PSM-Team80	SEAT Ibiza Mk4	10	Rodion Shushakov	2, 4
PSM-Team80	Kia Rio R2B	10	Rodion Shushakov	5
PSM-Team80	Kia Rio R2B	13	Igor Samsonov	1-6
Podmoskovye Motorsport	Volkswagen Polo R2 Mk5	17	Vladimir Cherevan	1-6
Podmoskovye Motorsport	Peugeot 207	17	Vladimir Cherevan	7
Podmoskovye Motorsport	Kia Rio R2B	43	Andrey Maslennikov	1-3
Podmoskovye Motorsport	Ford Fiesta Mk5	43	Andrey Maslennikov	4-7
Carville Racing	Peugeot 208 GTI	19	Grigory Burlutskiy	All
Carville Racing	Peugeot 208 GTI	27	Andrey Radoshnov	6-7
Andrey Radoshnov	Kia Rio R2B	27	Andrey Radoshnov	1-2, 4
Andrey Radoshnov	Volkswagen Polo R2 Mk5	27	Andrey Radoshnov	3, 5
Aydar Nuriev	Kia Rio R2B	48	Aydar Nuriev	7
LTA Rally	Kia Rio R2B	89	Aleksandr Malinin	6-7

=== National ===
Team	Car	No.	Driver	Rounds
Vladimir Gunyko	Lada Kalina	2	Vladimir Gunyko	2
Zenith Motorsport	Ford Fiesta Mk6	4	Sergey Koronatov	7
Zenith Motorsport	Ford Fiesta Mk6	52	Anna Aleksandrova	1-2
Lada Sport	Lada Kalina II	11	Vladimir Melnikov	5
Lada Sport	Lada Kalina II	17	Vitaly Primak	All
Lada Sport	Lada Kalina	10	Andrey Petukhov	All
Lada Sport	Lada Kalina	34	Vsevolod Gagen	All
Lada Sport	Lada Kalina	39	Vasiliy Krichevskiy	6
LTA Rally	Lada Kalina	39	Vasiliy Krichevskiy	5
Carville Racing	Lada Kalina	39	Vasiliy Krichevskiy	2
Carville Racing	Lada Kalina	39	Pavel Krichevskiy	1
Vladimir Sheshenin LBIT Sestritsa	Lada Kalina	19	Vladimir Sheshenin	All
Sergey Schegolev	Lada Kalina	24	Sergey Schegolev	2, 7
B-Tuning Pro Racing Team	Volkswagen Polo	25	Gleb Kuznetsov	All
B-Tuning Pro Racing Team	Volkswagen Polo	33	Anton Zakharov	7
B-Tuning Pro Racing Team	Volkswagen Polo	88	Ivan Demuh	6
Bauman MSTU	Lada Kalina II	26	Ivan Lyagusha	2
Oleg Todua	Lada Kalina	27	Oleg Todua	2, 5
Goltsova Racing	Lada Kalina	37	Natalya Goltsova	1-2, 4, 6-7
Goltsova Racing	Lada Kalina II	46	Efim Gantmakher	All
Igor Shin	Lada Kalina	38	Aleksey Shin	1-4, 7
Podmoskovie Motorsport	Ford Fiesta Mk6	43	Andrey Maslennikov	6
Podmoskovie Motorsport	Lada Kalina	96	Dmitry Karnaukhov	6
Ruslan Nafikov	Kia Rio	44	Ruslan Nafikov	3, 5, 7
Aleksandr Marushko	Lada Kalina	50	Aleksandr Marushko	All
Akademiya Rally	Volkswagen Polo	55	Ivan Kostyukov	All
Parus	Lada Kalina	56	Vasily Korablev	1, 5-7
AKHMAT Racing Team	Lada Kalina	56	Vasily Korablev	2
AKHMAT Racing Team	Volkswagen Polo	32	Islam Barzankaev	3-5, 7
AKHMAT Racing Team	Volkswagen Polo	95	Vitaly Dudin	3-6
AKHMAT Racing Team	Kia Rio	85	Roman Agoshkov	2-7
Spets-Avtoplast Motor Sport	Kia Rio	85	Roman Agoshkov	1
IZhAvtoSport, Ltd.	Lada Kalina	49	Ildar Fattakhov	7
Sergey Drebenets	Lada Kalina	57	Sergey Drebenets	1-2, 6
Vyacheslav Staroverov	Lada Kalina	63	Vyacheslav Staroverov	2-5
Vyacheslav Staroverov	Kia Rio	63	Vyacheslav Staroverov	7
Timerkhan	Kia Rio	73	Rais Minnikhanov	7
ALAS	Lada Kalina	77	Pavel Gavrilushkin	All
Sergey Golovanov	Lada Kalina	80	Sergey Golovanov	1-2, 4-7
Aleksandr Golovanov	Lada Kalina	84	Aleksandr Golovanov	1-2, 4-7
Aleksandr Malinin	Lada Kalina	97	Aleksandr Malinin	1-5
Yuliya Strukova	Kia Rio	99	Yuliya Strukova	All

=== Junior ===
Team	Car	No.	Driver	Rounds
Dmitry Gavrichenkov	Lada Kalina II	17	Anton Gavrichenkov	All
Sergey Kornilkov	Lada Kalina	25	Maxim Kornilkov	7
Viktoria Belotsvetova	Lada Samara	36	Kirill Havronin	2, 7
Andrey Gusev	Lada Kalina	90	Vladislav Gusev	All

== Calendar and results ==
The 2016 schedule was announced on 11 November 2015, with all events scheduled to be held in Russia. Updated on 10 March. 21 July announced that due to the reconstruction of ADM Raceway stage 6 moved to Smolenskring.

Rnd.		Circuit	Date	Touring winner	SP winner	TL winner	National winner	Junior winner	Supporting
1	1	Smolensk Ring, Smolensk	14 May	Dmitry Bragin	Maksim Chernev	Dmitry Bragin	Roman Agoshkov	Anton Gavrichenkov	TCR Trophy Europe
1	2	Smolensk Ring, Smolensk	15 May	Aleksey Dudukalo	Maksim Chernev	Mikhail Mityaev	Vitaly Primak	Vladislav Gusev	TCR Trophy Europe
2	3	NRING Circuit, Bogorodsk	28 May	Dmitry Bragin	Maksim Simonov	Andrey Maslennikov	Gleb Kuznetsov	Kirill Havronin	
2	4	NRING Circuit, Bogorodsk	29 May	Aleksey Dudukalo	Maksim Simonov	Dmitry Bragin	Vladimir Sheshenin	Vladislav Gusev	
3	5	Fort Grozny, Grozny	18 June	Dmitry Bragin	Vladimir Strelchenko	Ildar Rakhmatullin	Vsevolod Gagen	Not conducted	
3	6	Fort Grozny, Grozny	19 June	Dmitry Bragin	Maksim Chernev	Denis Bulatov	Ivan Kostukov	Not conducted	
4	7	Sochi Autodrom, Sochi	2 July	Dmitry Bragin	Anton Badoev	Mikhail Mityaev	Roman Agoshkov	Not conducted	TCR International Series Sochi Round
4	8	Sochi Autodrom, Sochi	3 July	Nikolay Karamyshev	Vladislav Nezvankin	Ildar Rakhmatullin	Vitaly Dudin	Not conducted	TCR International Series Sochi Round
5	9	Moscow Raceway, Volokolamsk	23 July	Dmitry Bragin	Maksim Chernev	Denis Bulatov	Vladimir Sheshenin	Not conducted	Deutsche Tourenwagen Masters; SMP F4 Championship
5	10	Moscow Raceway, Volokolamsk	24 July	Aleksey Dudukalo	Mikhail Loboda	Andrey Maslennikov	Roman Agoshkov	Not conducted	Deutsche Tourenwagen Masters; SMP F4 Championship
6	11	Smolensk Ring, Smolensk	27 August	Nikolay Karamyshev	Maksim Chernev	Dmitry Bragin	Vladimir Sheshenin	Anton Gavrichenkov	
6	12	Smolensk Ring, Smolensk	28 August	Dmitry Bragin	Maksim Chernev	Mikhail Mityaev	Ivan Kostukov	Anton Gavrichenkov	
7	13	Kazan Ring, Kazan	17 September	Dmitry Bragin	Maksim Simonov	Dmitry Bragin	Vladimir Sheshenin	Maxim Kornilkov	
7	14	Kazan Ring, Kazan	18 September	Nikolay Karamyshev	Vladislav Nezvankin	Dmitry Bragin	Gleb Kuznetsov	Vladislav Gusev	

== Championship standings ==
Pos.	Driver	SMO		NRI		GRO		SOC		MSC		SMO		KAZ		Pts.
Touring
1	Dmitry Bragin	**1**	3	**1**	7	**1**	1	**1**	3	**1**	5	**3**	1	1	9	1180
2	Aleksey Dudukalo	2	1	2	1	2	3	3	15	2	1	5	2	3	2	1160
3	Nikolay Karamyshev	3	2	Ret	2	6	2	2	1	4	3	1	11†	**2**	1	1136
4	Roman Golikov	4	6	3	6	3	7	4	2	3	Ret	2	3	4	3	1078
5	Pavel Yashin	5	7	7	3	7	6	4	5	5	2	8	12	7	Ret	996
6	Lev Tolkachev	6	**5**	4	4	5	4	7	Ret	7	Ret	7	4	6	7	992
7	Marat Sharapov	10	Ret	13	5	4	5	16	6	6	4	6	5	16	10	938
8	Irek Minnakhmetov	7	4	Ret	16			6	5	8	Ret	4	9	5	4	800
9	Oleg Haruk							DNS	DNS	DNS	13	15	13	Ret	17	252
10	Andrey Artyshin									DNS	15	18	15			180
11	Rais Minnikhanov													17	8	134
12	Klim Gavrilov					DSQ	Ret									0
Super Production
1	Maksim Chernev	**8**	8	16	9	Ret	8	12	9	**8**	18	**9**	6	13	19	1110
2	Anton Badoev	9	10	6	10	10	Ret	8	11	11	7	13	10	10	12	1110
3	Maksim Simonov	11	12	**5**	8	9	11	15	16	17	10	19	DNS	8	14	1052
4	Vitaly Larionov	Ret	15	8	12	Ret	9	14	10	20	8	11	7	**11**	15	1030
5	Efim Gantmakher	DNS	Ret	9	14	11	12	13	8	14	17	10	8	12	20	1008
6	Aleksandr Tupitsyn	13	13	Ret	17	13	13	20	17	16	9	14	DNS	19	6	950
7	Denis Grigoryev	15	14	14	Ret	15	14	18	18	18	12	17	14	Ret	16	914
8	Andrey Yushin	12	11	15	15	12	15	11	12	12	14	12	DNS			906
9	Vladimir Strelchenko	16	DNS	10	13	8	10	19	14	15	11			14	18	890
10	Vladislav Nezvankin	Ret	9	12	11	**Ret**	16	10	7	13	16	**Ret**	DNS	18	5	868
11	Aleksandr Garmash	14	Ret	Ret	18	14	17	17	19	19	Ret	16	DNS	Ret	Ret	592
12	Mikhail Loboda	17	Ret	Ret	Ret	Ret	Ret	**9**	13	10	6					446
13	Artem Kabakov											DSQ	DNS	9	11	192
14	Sergey Golubev													15	13	160
15	Sergey Shalunov			11	DSQ											70
-	Aleksey Titov													NQ	NQ	-
Touring-Light
1	Dmitry Bragin	**1**	3	5	1	3	3	7	9	2	7	**1**	5	**1**	1	1126
2	Mikhail Mityaev	6	1	7	Ret	2	4	**1**	3	4	4	10	1	4	4	1090
3	Denis Bulatov	2	5	4	3	7	1	11	5	**1**	2	7	4	8	DSQ	1062
4	Grigory Burlutskiy	5	11	3	6	10	2	9	6	3	5	2	2	7	6	1034
5	Vladimir Cherevan	11	4	2	8	6	5	4	4	Ret	12	5	9	10	5	984
6	Ilsur Akhmetvaleev	8	7	9	9	8	7	6	7	8	9	9	3	3	8	954
7	Andrey Radoshnov	3	8	Ret	2	5	6	Ret	8	Ret	10	4	7	11	3	904
8	Igor Samsonov	9	9	6	5	11	8	10	11	9	6	12	11			892
9	Ildar Rakhmatullin	4	2	8	Ret	**1**	Ret	3	1	6	8	6	DSQ			790
10	Andrey Maslennikov	10	Ret	**1**	7	Ret	Ret	Ret	2	10	1	3	6	6	Ret	780
11	Timur Boguslavskiy							8	10	5	11			2	2	494
12	Andrey Sevastyanov					4	10	2	12			8	Ret	Ret	Ret	402
13	Rodion Shushakov	Ret	10	Ret	НС	9	9	5	Ret	11	Ret					374
14	Klim Gavrilov									7	3	11	8			318
15	Aleksandr Malinin											13	10	9	9	286
16	Andrey Nikolaev	7	6	Ret	4											246
17	Aydar Nuriev													6	7	158
National
1	Vladimir Sheshenin	2	4	5	1	12	6	8	8	1	Ret	**1**	2	1	11	1070
2	Roman Agoshkov	**1**	2	2	13	6	Ret	**1**	2	5	1	18	7	Ret	13	1028
3	Ivan Kostyukov	Ret	7	3	Ret	**4**	1	2	5	4	4	16	1	8	Ret	958
4	Vitaly Primak	8	1	9	6	11	12	7	3	6	20	8	5	7	Ret	958
5	Vsevolod Gagen	7	11	7	18	1	15	5	6	12	Ret	3	6	Ret	4	938
6	Gleb Kuznetsov	Ret	8	**1**	Ret	5	3	3	4	**2**	16	Ret	14	13	1	844
7	Andrey Petukhov	3	5	4	2	Ret	4	11	Ret	3	18	4	11	3	Ret	916
8	Efim Gantmakher	5	3	6	12	DNS	7	10	10	9	6	11	9	14	Ret	908
9	Aleksandr Golovanov	16	Ret	19	7			4	7	11	5	5	4	2	Ret	782
10	Sergey Golovanov	12	12	10	3			Ret	4	20	12	17	12	20	7	744
11	Yuliya Strukova	14	17	13	Ret	Ret	11	18	17	18	10	7	Ret	11	6	728
12	Aleksandr Marushko	6	Ret	Ret	8	7	9	12	13	Ret	11	Ret	10	9	15	720
13	Pavel Gavrilushkin	DNS	10	11	9	8	8	14	Ret	17	13	9	Ret	12	Ret	698
14	Vitaly Dudin					3	2	7	1	8	3	15	8			672
15	Vyacheslav Staroverov			12	16	2	10	9	9	14	8			6	Ret	664
16	Aleksey Shin	10	9	14	Ret	9	13	17	15					19	9	598
17	Vasily Korablev	15	6	Ret	6					13	7	13	17	Ret	2	590
18	Natalia Goltsova	4	16	8	11			15	16			10	Ret	10	DSQ	560
19	Aleksandr Malinin	9	13	15	4	Ret	Ret	13	11	15	17					546
20	Islam Barzankaev					10	14	16	14	19	15			18	12	500
21	Ruslan Nafikov					DSQ	17			7	2			4	14	412
22	Sergey Drebenets	11	14	16	15							12	15			386
23	Vasiliy Krichevskiy			Ret	10					16	14	Ret	13			262
24	Andrey Maslennikov											2	3			188
25	Sergey Schegolev			17	14									16	Ret	182
26	Anton Zakharov													5	5	168
27	Vladimir Melnikov									10	9					146
28	Rais Minnikhanov													21	3	142
29	Sergey Koronatov													17	8	134
30	Ildar Fattakhov													15	10	134
31	Anna Aleksandrova	13	15	DNS	DNS											128
32	Dmitry Karnaukhov											14	16			124
33	Vladimir Gunyko			18	17											114
34	Oleg Todua			20	Ret					Ret	19					106
35	Ivan Demuh											6	Ret			80
36	Ivan Lyagusha			DNS	19											54
-	Pavel Krichevskiy	NQ	NQ													-
National-Junior
1	Anton Gavrichenkov	**1**	2	3	1							**1**	1	4	3	782
2	Vladislav Gusev	2	1	2	1							2	2	3	1	776
3	Kirill Havronin			1	3									**2**	4	386
4	Maxim Kornilkov													1	2	196
Pos.	Driver	SMO		NRI		GRO		SOC		MSC		SMO		KAZ		Pts.

Colour	Result
Gold	Winner
Silver	Second place
Bronze	Third place
Green	Points classification
Blue	Non-points classification
Blue	Non-classified finish (NC)
Purple	Retired, not classified (Ret)
Red	Did not qualify (DNQ)
Red	Did not pre-qualify (DNPQ)
Black	Disqualified (DSQ)
White	Did not start (DNS)
White	Withdrew (WD)
White	Race cancelled (C)
Blank	Did not practice (DNP)
Blank	Did not arrive (DNA)
Blank	Excluded (EX)

**Bold** – Pole
Italics – Fastest Lap

† – Drivers did not finish the race, but were classified as they completed over 75% of the race distance.
The number of points after the deduction of the two worst results.
