= Klim Gavrilov =

Russian racing driver

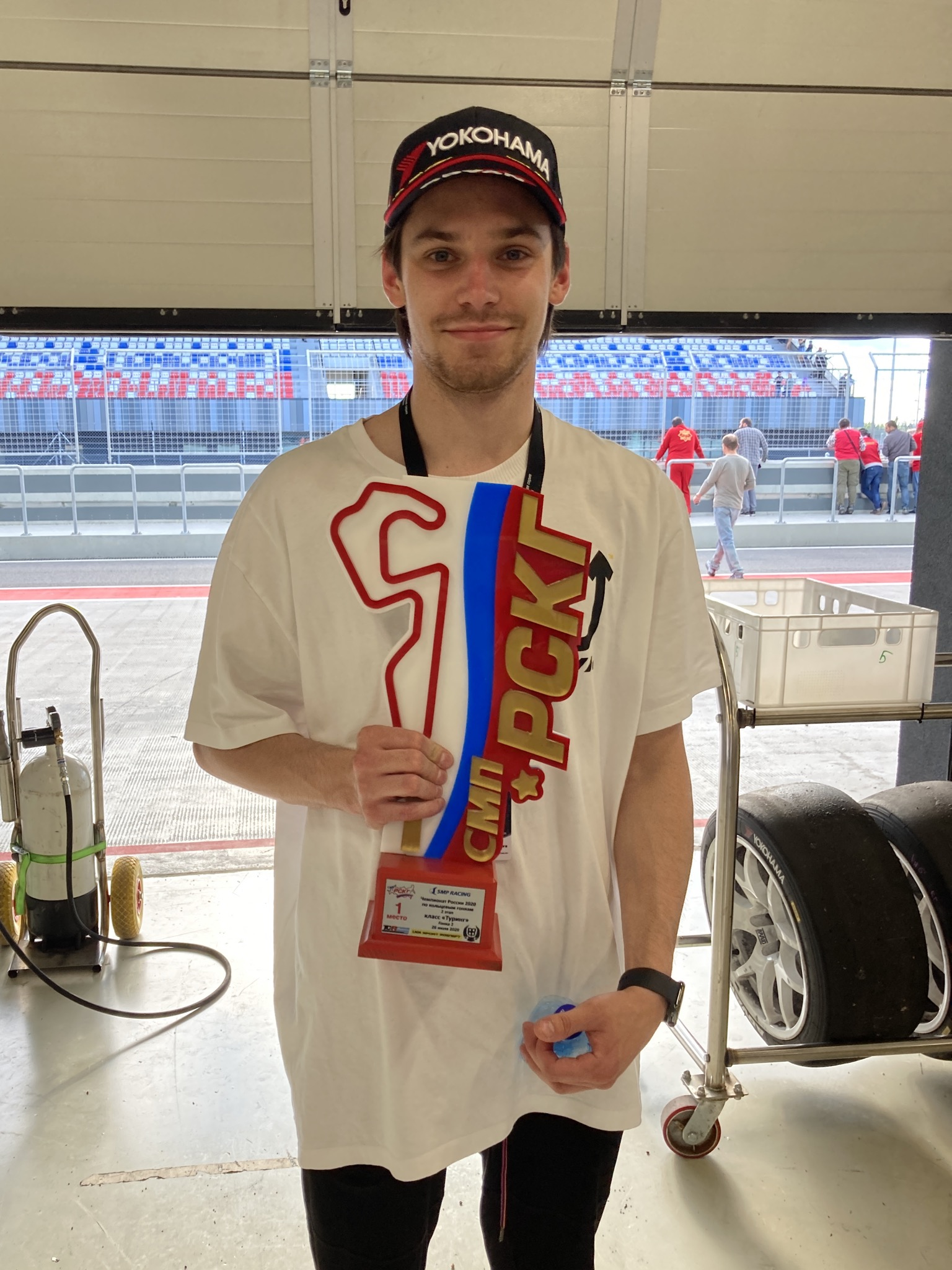
- Gavrilov after winning a race in the 2020 Russian Circuit Racing Series
- Nationality: Russian
- Born: 27 March 2000 (age 26) Saint Petersburg, Russia

Russian Circuit Racing Series career
- Debut season: 2016
- Current team: Carville Racing
- Car number: 14
- Starts: 45
- Wins: 8
- Podiums: 13
- Best finish: 3rd in 2019
- Finished last season: 3rd
Medal record
Touring Car Racing
Representing Russia
FIA Motorsport Games
Gold medal – first place	2019 Rome	Touring Car Cup

Klim Gavrilov (born 27 March 2000) is a Russian racing driver currently racing in the TCR Europe Touring Car Series. He won the 2019 FIA Motorsport Games Touring Car Cup representing Team Russia.

== Racing record ==
=== Career summary ===
Season	Series	Team	Races	Wins	Poles	F/Laps	Podiums	Points	Position
2016	Russian Circuit Racing Series - Touring	B-Tuning PRO Racing Team	2	0	0	0	0	0	12th
2016	Russian Circuit Racing Series - Touring Light	B-Tuning PRO Racing Team	4	0	0	1	1	318	14th
2017	Russian Circuit Racing Series - Touring	Lukoil Racing +	14	1	1	0	3	133	7th
2018	TCR Europe Touring Car Series	LTA Rally Team	2	0	0	0	0	0	47th
2018	TCR Ibérico Touring Car Series	LTA Rally Team	2	0	0	0	0	0	34th
2018	Russian Circuit Racing Series - Touring	Lukoil Racing Team	6	1	0	0	2	169	5th
2018	Russian Circuit Racing Series - Touring	LTA Rally	8	2	2	1	2	169	5th
2019	TCR Italy Touring Car Championship	LTA Rally	2	1	0	0	1	21	12th
2019	TCR Italy Touring Car Championship	VRC Team	2	0	1	0	0	21	12th
2019	TCR Europe Touring Car Series	VRC Team	4	0	0	0	0	8	35th
2019	Russian Circuit Racing Series - Touring	VRC Team	2	0	0	0	0	186	**3rd**
2019	Russian Circuit Racing Series - Touring	Carville Racing	12	3	3	3	5	186	**3rd**
2019	FIA Motorsport Games Touring Car Cup	Team Russia	2	1	0	2	2	47	**1st**
2020	Russian Circuit Racing Series - Touring	VRC Team	12	3	1	2	6	183	**2nd**
2021	TCR Europe Touring Car Series	VRC Team	12	0	0	1	0	164	15th
2021	TCR Europe Touring Car Series	Volcano Motorsport	2	1	0	0	1	164	15th
2022	TCR Europe Touring Car Series	Volcano Motorsport	13	0	0	0	3	256	5th
2022	TCR Spain - CEST	Volcano Motorsport	3	1	1	1	2	84	6th

=== Complete Russian Circuit Racing Series results ===
(key) (Races in bold indicate pole position) (Races in italics indicate fastest lap)

Year	Team	Car	Class	1	2	3	4	5	6	7	8	9	10	11	12	13	14	DC	Points
2016	B-Tuning PRO Racing Team	SEAT Leon Supercopa Mk2	Touring	SMO; 1	SMO; 2	NRI; 1	NRI; 2	GRO; 1 DSQ	GRO; 2 Ret	SOC; 1	SOC; 2							12th	0
2016	B-Tuning PRO Racing Team	Volkswagen Polo R2 Mk5	Touring Light									MSC; 1; 7	MSC; 2; 3	SMO; 1; 11	SMO; 2; 8	KAZ; 1	KAZ; 2	14th	318
2017	Lukoil Racing +	SEAT León TCR	Touring/TCR	GRO; 1; 6	GRO; 2 Ret	**SMO**; **1**; 11	SMO; 2; 5	NRI; 1; 6	NRI; 2; 3	KAZ; 1; 6	KAZ; 2; 3	SMO; 1; 8	SMO; 2; 1	MSC; 1; 8	MSC; 2 Ret	KAZ; 1; 4	KAZ; 2 DSQ	7th	133
2018	Lukoil Racing Team	Audi RS3 LMS TCR SEQ	Touring/TCR	GRO; 1; 1	GRO; 2; 8	SMO; 1; 4	SMO; 2; 14	NRI; 1; 4	NRI; 2; 3									5th	169
2018	LTA Rally	Volkswagen Golf GTI TCR SEQ	Touring/TCR							KAZ; 1; 14	KAZ; 2 Ret	**MSC**; **1**; 1	MSC; 2; 4	**SOC**; **1**; 1	SOC; 2; 6	GRO; 1; 10	GRO; 2; 8	5th	169
2019	VRC Team	Audi RS3 LMS TCR SEQ	Touring/TCR	GRO; 1; 4	GRO; 1; 12													3rd	186
2019	Carville Racing	Audi RS3 LMS TCR SEQ	Touring/TCR			**NRI**; **1**; 1	NRI; 2; 17	SMO; 1; 3	SMO; 2; 5	**KAZ**; **1**; 1	KAZ; 2; 7	**ADM**; **1**; 1	ADM; 2; 4	MSC; 1; 6	MSC; 2; 3	SOC; 1; 4	SOC; 2; 16	3rd	186

=== Complete TCR Europe Touring Car Series results ===
(key) (Races in bold indicate pole position) (Races in italics indicate fastest lap)

Year	Team	Car	1	2	3	4	5	6	7	8	9	10	11	12	13	14	DC	Points
2018	VRC Team	Volkswagen Golf GTI TCR	LEC; 1	LEC; 2	ZAN; 1	ZAN; 2	SPA; 1	SPA; 2	HUN; 1	HUN; 2	ASS; 1	ASS; 2	MNZ; 1	MNZ; 2	CAT; 1; 23	CAT; 2 Ret	47th	0
2019	VRC Team	Audi RS3 LMS TCR	HUN; 1	HUN; 2	HOC; 1	HOC; 2	SPA; 1; 20	SPA; 2; 15	RBR; 1	RBR; 2	OSC; 1	OSC; 2	CAT; 1	CAT; 2	MNZ; 1; 13	MNZ; 2; 29	35th	8
2021	VRC Team	Audi RS3 LMS TCR	SVK; 1 Ret	SVK; 2; 4	LEC; 1; 13	LEC; 2; 15	ZAN; 1; 9	ZAN; 2 Ret	SPA; 1; 11	SPA; 2; 12	NÜR; 1; 6	NÜR; 2; 6	MNZ; 1; 15	MNZ; 2; 16			15th	164
2021	Volcano Motorsport	CUPRA León Competición TCR													CAT; 1; 11	CAT; 2; 1	15th	164
2022	Volcano Motorsport	CUPRA León Competición TCR	ALG; 1; 7	ALG; 2; 6	LEC; 1; 5	LEC; 2; 2	SPA; 1; 6	SPA; 2; 8	NOR; 1; 12	NOR; 2; 2	NÜR; 1 Ret	NÜR; 2 C	MNZ; 1; 9	MNZ; 2; 2	CAT; 1; 12	CAT; 2; 16	5th	256

=== Complete TCR Italy Touring Car Championship results ===
(key) (Races in bold indicate pole position) (Races in italics indicate fastest lap)

Year	Team	Car	1	2	3	4	5	6	7	8	9	10	11	12	13	14	DC	Points
2019	LTA Rally	Audi RS3 LMS TCR	MNZ; 1; 1	MNZ; 2 Ret	MIS; 1	MIS; 2	IMO; 1	IMO; 2									12th	21
2019	VRC-Team	Audi RS3 LMS TCR							RBR; 1; 13	RBR; 2; 14†	OSC; 1	OSC; 2	CAT; 1	CAT; 2	MNZ; 1; 13	MNZ; 2; 29	12th	21

† – Drivers did not finish the race, but were classified as they completed over 75% of the race distance.

Sporting positions
Preceded by Inaugural	FIA Motorsport Games; Touring Car Cup Winner; 2019	Succeeded by Incumbent
