= 2018 Russian Circuit Racing Series =

Motor racing season

The 2018 SMP Russian Circuit Racing Series was the fifth season of the Russian Circuit Racing Series, organized by SMP Racing. It was the fourth season with TCR class cars.

== Teams and drivers ==
Yokohama is the official tyre supplier.

=== Touring / TCR Russian Touring Car Championship ===
All teams are Russian-registered. All drivers, excepting Belarusian driver Vladislav Gorlach, raced under Russian racing license.

Team	Car	No.	Drivers	Class	Rounds
STK TAIF Motorsport	Audi RS3 LMS TCR SEQ	1	Dmitry Bragin		All
STK TAIF Motorsport	Audi RS3 LMS TCR SEQ	87	Marat Sharapov	T	1–3
STK TAIF Motorsport	Audi RS3 LMS TCR SEQ	89	Timur Shigabutdinov	T	2–5
STK Chingiskhan	Audi RS3 LMS TCR SEQ	76	Irek Minnakhmetov	T	1–6
Lukoil Racing Team	SEAT Léon TCR DSG	43	Andrey Maslennikov		4–7
Lukoil Racing Team	SEAT Léon TCR DSG	77	Ivan Lukashevich		1–3
Lukoil Racing Team	Audi RS3 LMS TCR SEQ	77	Ivan Lukashevich		4–7
Lukoil Racing Team	Audi RS3 LMS TCR SEQ	3	Aleksey Dudukalo		All
Lukoil Racing Team	Audi RS3 LMS TCR SEQ	14	Klim Gavrilov		1–3
LTA Rally	Volkswagen Golf GTI TCR SEQ	14	Klim Gavrilov		4–7
LTA Rally	SEAT León TCR DSG	80	Andrey Abaluev	T	5–7
UMMC Motorsport	Volkswagen Golf GTI TCR DSG	5	Roman Golikov	T	All
RUMOS AMG Motorsport	SEAT León TCR DSG	7	Mikhail Stepanov	T	All
RUMOS AMG Motorsport	SEAT / CUPRA León TCR SEQ	47	Lev Tolkachev	T	All
Green Racing Team	SEAT / CUPRA León TCR DSG	8	Vladimir Gorlach	T	2–3, 5
NEVA Motorsport	SEAT León TCR DSG	9	Oleg Kharuk	T	1–3
NEVA Motorsport	Honda Civic Type R TCR FK8	9	Oleg Kharuk	T	4–7
NEVA Motorsport	SEAT / CUPRA León TCR DSG / SEQ	17	Pavel Yashin	T	All
NEVA Motorsport	CUPRA León TCR DSG	46	Efim Gantmakher	T	5–6
Rally Academy	SEAT / CUPRA León TCR DSG / SEQ	10	Anton Badoev	T	All
LADA Sport Rosneft	LADA Vesta TCR	11	Kirill Ladygin (Note: At the first and third stage for the team LADA Sport Rosneft, along with Grachev was declared Shechenin, in the second stage Ladygin.)		All
LADA Sport Rosneft	LADA Vesta TCR	19	Vladimir Sheshenin		All
LADA Sport Rosneft	LADA Vesta TCR	27	Mikhail Grachev		All
AG Team	SEAT León TCR DSG	18	Thomas Johnson	T	7
AKHMAT Racing Team	Volkswagen Golf GTI TCR	88	Vitaliy Dudin		1, 5–7
AKHMAT Racing Team	SEAT / CUPRA León TCR	95	Magomed Daghiev	T	1, 4–7
Carville Racing	SEAT León TCR DSG	91	Grigoriy Burlutskiy		2–6

Key
Teams claimed for team points.
T	SMP RCRS Trophy

=== Super Production & Touring-Light ===
All teams and drivers are Russian-registered. All drivers raced under Russian racing license.

Team	Car	No.	Drivers	Rounds
Super Production
Balashikha training center of DOSAAF	Honda Civic Type-R Mk7	10	Vladimir Strelchenko	7
Balashikha training center of DOSAAF	Honda Civic Type-R Mk7	55	Vladislav Kubasov	5
Mikhail Putyatin	LADA Granta Cup	11	Mikhail Putyatin	4
LADA Sport Rosneft	LADA Vesta 1.6T	30	Mikhail Mityaev	All
LADA Sport Rosneft	LADA Vesta 1.6T	50	Vladislav Nezvankin	All
LADA Sport Rosneft	LADA Granta Cup	45	Evgeniy Meites	2
Autoproduct Match TV GTE Racing Team	LADA Granta Cup	45	Evgeniy Meites	3–7
Autoproduct Match TV GTE Racing Team	LADA Granta Cup	84	Philipp Tuponosov	3–7
GTE Racing Team	Mazda 3	84	Philipp Tuponosov	1
Andrey Emelin	Mazda 3	37	Andrey Emelin	7
NEFIS Racing Division	LADA Granta Cup	44	Ilsur Akhmetvaleev	All
NEFIS Racing Division	LADA Granta Cup	58	Aleksandr Marushko	1–4
Delphi Technologies RHHCC R.T. ALAS	Volkswagen Scirocco	54	Aleksandr Garmash	1–2, 4–7
Delphi Technologies RHHCC R.T. ALAS	Honda Civic Type-R Mk7	54	Aleksandr Garmash	3
Delphi Technologies RHHCC R.T. ALAS	Honda Civic Type-R Mk7	88	Nikolay Vikhanskiy	All
Neva Motorsport	Honda Civic Type-R Mk8	77	Dmitry Dobrovolskiy	5
Touring-Light
SUVAR Motorsport	Renault Twingo Sport	4	Ildar Rakhmatullin	1–6
SUVAR Motorsport	Renault Twingo Sport	8	Timur Boguslasvskiy	6
SUVAR Motorsport	Renault Twingo Sport	97	Aleksandr Malinin	2–5
LTA Rally	Opel Adam	97	Aleksandr Malinin	1
LTA Rally	Hyundai Solaris RB	19	Rodion Shushakov	1, 3–5
LTA Rally	Ford Fiesta Mk6	19	Rodion Shushakov	7
SMP Racing	Opel Adam	7	Nikita Volegov	2
Rally Academy	Volkswagen Polo R2 Mk5	13	Igor Samsonov	All
Podmoskovie Motorsport	Volkswagen Polo R2 Mk5	17	Vladimir Cherevan	All
Podmoskovie Motorsport	Ford Fiesta Mk5	43	Andrey Maslennikov	All
B-Tuning PRO Racing	Volkswagen Polo R2 Mk5	22	Anton Zakharov	5
Carville Racing	Peugeot 208 GTi	27	Andrey Radoshnov	All
Carville Racing	Peugeot 208 GTi	91	Grigoriy Burlutskiy	All

Key
Teams claimed for team points.

=== National ===
All teams are Russian-registered. All drivers raced under Russian racing license.

Team	Car	No.	Drivers	Rounds
Bragin Racing Team; AAC Syzran Sport	LADA Kalina	20	Egor Sanin	1–4
Bragin Racing Team; AAC Syzran Sport	Kia Rio	20	Egor Sanin	5–7
Bragin Racing Team; AAC Syzran Sport	Hyundai Solaris	12	Mikhail Simonov	5–6
Bragin Racing Team; AAC Syzran Sport	LADA Kalina	12	Mikhail Simonov	1–2, 4, 7
Bragin Racing Team; AAC Syzran Sport	LADA Kalina	1	Aydar Nuriev	3
AG Team	Kia Rio	1	Aydar Nuriev	7
AG Team	Kia Rio	7	Tatiana Dobrynina	1–2
AG Team	Kia Rio	18	Thomas Johnson	1–6
AG Team	Kia Rio	34	Vsevolod Gagen	4
AG Team	Kia Rio	71	Arkady Illeritskiy	5
AG Team	Hyundai Solaris	17	Pavel Kalmanovich	All
AG Team	Hyundai Solaris	28	Anvar Tutaev	All
Sergey Schegolev	LADA Kalina NFR R1	4	Sergey Schegolev	2–5
Rally Academy	Volkswagen Polo	5	Gleb Kuznetsov	All
Rally Academy	Volkswagen Polo	55	Denis Mavlanov	1–6
Rally Academy	Volkswagen Polo	22	Aleksandr Maslennikov	7
NEVA KART	Volkswagen Polo	22	Aleksandr Maslennikov	1-4
B-Tuning Pro Racing Team	Volkswagen Polo	22	Aleksandr Maslennikov	5-6
B-Tuning Pro Racing Team	Volkswagen Polo	21	Egor Kiryakov	1–6
Redmond Drive	Hyundai Solaris	8	Igor Lvov	All
Redmond Drive	Kia Rio	46	Julia Strukova	5–7
Zener Racing Team	Kia Rio	46	Julia Strukova	1–3
Zener Racing Team	Hyundai Solaris	88	Vasiliy Krichevskiy	1–6
LADA Sport Rosneft UMMC	LADA Kalina NFR R1	10	Andrey Petukhov	All
AKHMAT Racing	Volkswagen Polo	11	Vladislav Seredenko	1
AKHMAT Racing	Volkswagen Polo	63	Ibraghim Akhmadov	1, 4–7
AKHMAT Racing	Volkswagen Polo	64	Khalid Alviev	1
AKHMAT Racing	Volkswagen Polo	73	Ivan Kostukov	7
AKHMAT Racing	Kia Rio X-Line	44	Ruslan Nafikov	All
AKHMAT Racing	Kia Rio X-Line	95	Roman Agoshkov	All
Andrey Vasilyev	Volkswagen Polo	14	Andrey Vasilyev	All
Roman Shusharin	Kia Rio	15	Roman Shusharin	All
Rafael Fattakhov	LADA Kalina	16	Rafael Fattakhov	3
Aleksandr Salnikov	Hyundai Solaris	27	Aleksandr Salnikov	1–6
Dmitryi Dudarev	LADA Kalina	33	Dmitryi Dudarev	3
Oleg Kulakov	LADA Kalina	45	Oleg Kulakov	3
Parus	Kia Rio	56	Vasiliy Korablev	All
Sergey Drebenets	Lada Kalina	57	Sergey Drebenets	2–3, 5
LTA Rally	Hyundai Solaris	70	Yuriy Gavrilov	1–3
UMMC	LADA Kalina NFR R1	77	Efim Gantmakher	1–3

Key
Teams claimed for team points.

=== National Junior ===
All teams and drivers are Russian-registered. All drivers raced under Russian racing license.

Team	Car	No.	Drivers	Rounds
AR Junior: Rally Academy 1 Rally Academy 2	Volkswagen Polo	5	Irina Sidorkova	All
AR Junior: Rally Academy 1 Rally Academy 2	Volkswagen Polo	7	Anastasia Grishina	All
AR Junior: Rally Academy 1 Rally Academy 2	Volkswagen Polo	35	Pavel Kuzminov	All
AR Junior: Rally Academy 1 Rally Academy 2	Volkswagen Polo	55	Petr Plotnikov	All
B-Tuning Pro Racing: Anton Zakharov's Racing Academy 1 Anton Zakharov's Racing Academy 2	Volkswagen Polo	9	Aleksey Sakharov	All
B-Tuning Pro Racing: Anton Zakharov's Racing Academy 1 Anton Zakharov's Racing Academy 2	Volkswagen Polo	11	Nikita Dubinin	7
B-Tuning Pro Racing: Anton Zakharov's Racing Academy 1 Anton Zakharov's Racing Academy 2	Volkswagen Polo	21	Pavel Parshutin	All
B-Tuning Pro Racing: Anton Zakharov's Racing Academy 1 Anton Zakharov's Racing Academy 2	Volkswagen Polo	22	Ilya Doschechkin	All
B-Tuning Pro Racing: Anton Zakharov's Racing Academy 1 Anton Zakharov's Racing Academy 2	Volkswagen Polo	33	Artem Lyakin	All
Zorro Gepard	Volkswagen Polo	10	Egor Fokin	All
Salavat Fathutdinov	Volkswagen Polo	18	Rustam Fathutdinov	All
Goltsova Racing	LADA Kalina	27	Sergey Malov	All
Goltsova Racing	LADA Kalina	77	Virsavia Goltsova	2, 4
Goltsova Racing	LADA Kalina	88	Daniil Velmyakin	1–2
Eduard Velmyakin	LADA Kalina	88	Daniil Velmyakin	4
LTA Rally	LADA Kalina	56	Dmitriy Prikhnenko	1–2
Akhmat Racing	Volkswagen Polo	63	Dzhabrail Akhmadov	7

Key
Driver claimed for team points.

== Calendar and results ==
The 2018 schedule was announced on 12 October 2017, with all events scheduled to be held in Russia.

Rnd.		Circuit	Date	Touring winner	SP winner	TL winner	National winner	Junior winner	Supporting
1	1	Fort Grozny Autodrom, Grozny	14 April	Klim Gavrilov	Vladislav Nezvankin	Grigoriy Burlutskiy	Egor Sanin	Irina Sidorkova	
1	2	Fort Grozny Autodrom, Grozny	15 April	Roman Golikov	Vladislav Nezvankin	Igor Samsonov	Andrey Petukhov	Pavel Kuzminov	
2	3	Smolensk Ring, Smolensk	5 May	Dmitry Bragin	Mikhail Mityaev	Andrey Maslennikov	Gleb Kuznetsov	Irina Sidorkova	SMP F4 Championship
2	4	Smolensk Ring, Smolensk	6 May	Kirill Ladygin	Vladislav Nezvankin	Andrey Radoshnov	Andrey Petukhov	Irina Sidorkova	SMP F4 Championship
3	5	NRING Circuit, Bogorodsk	2 June	Dmitry Bragin	Mikhail Mityaev	Igor Samsonov	Pavel Kalmanovich	Not conducted	SMP F4 Championship
3	6	NRING Circuit, Bogorodsk	3 June	Ivan Lukashevich	Mikhail Mityaev	Ildar Rakhmatullin	Gleb Kuznetsov	Not conducted	SMP F4 Championship
4	7	Kazan Ring, Kazan	21 July	Aleksey Dudukalo	Vladislav Nezvankin	Igor Samsonov	Ruslan Nafikov	Pavel Kuzminov	
4	8	Kazan Ring, Kazan	22 July	Kirill Ladygin	Vladislav Nezvankin	Andrey Maslennikov	Igor Lvov	Rustam Fathutdinov	
5	9	Moscow Raceway, Volokolamsk	11 August	Klim Gavrilov	Mikhail Mityaev	Igor Samsonov	Gleb Kuznetsov	Petr Plotnikov	SMP F4 Championship
5	10	Moscow Raceway, Volokolamsk	12 August	Aleksey Dudukalo	Mikhail Mityaev	Ildar Rakhmatullin	Pavel Kalmanovich	Sergey Malov	SMP F4 Championship
6	11	Sochi Autodrom, Sochi	1 September	Klim Gavrilov	Mikhail Mityaev	Grigoriy Burlutskiy	Gleb Kuznetsov	Not conducted	
6	12	Sochi Autodrom, Sochi	2 September	Dmitry Bragin	Mikhail Mityaev	Timur Boguslavskiy	Egor Sanin	Not conducted	
7	13	Fort Grozny Autodrom, Grozny	5 October	Kirill Ladygin	Vladislav Nezvankin	Andrey Radoshnov	Andrey Petukhov	Rustam Fathutdinov	AKHMAT Race 2018
7	14	Fort Grozny Autodrom, Grozny	6 October	Aleksey Dudukalo	Evgenii Meites	Andrey Maslennikov	Gleb Kuznetsov	Petr Plotnikov	AKHMAT Race 2018

== Championship standings ==
Scoring systems

Position	1st	2nd	3rd	4th	5th	6th	7th	8th	9th	10th	11th	12th	13th	14th	15th	PP	FL
Points	25	20	16	13	11	10	9	8	7	6	5	4	3	2	1	**1**	1

=== Touring / TCR Russian Touring Car Championship ===
In the Russian Championship only pilots with a Russian racing license earn points, foreign pilots take part only in TCR Russia.

Pos.	Driver	GRO		SMO		NRG		KAZ		MSC		SOC		GRO		Pts.
1	Dmitry Bragin	**12**	5	1	6	**1**	7	2	2	3	3	7	1	6	2	223
2	Aleksey Dudukalo	5	2	5	3	DNS	Ret	**1**	15	7	1	3	2	7	1	190
3	Kirill Ladygin	6	7	7	1	3	6	5	1	18†	16	6	9	1	4	174
4	Ivan Lukashevich	4	15	**2**	5	8	1	13	6	6	2	2	7	5	5	174
5	Klim Gavrilov	1	8	4	14	4	3	14	Ret	**1**	4	**1**	6	10	8	169
6	Anton Badoev	16†	6	8	2	10	10	6	3	4	Ret	4	4	3	6	141
7	Mikhail Grachev	2	10	12	7	11	5	8	10	11	7	9	8	**2**	3	138
8	Vladimir Sheshenin	3	4	9	8	2	4	4	8	Ret	12	5	5	4	Ret	138
9	Roman Golikov	8	1	3	10	6	13	9	5	5	6	Ret	10	8	14	123
10	Lev Tolkachev	9	3	6	4	9	2	10	16	8	20	17†	15	9	10	101
11	Andrey Maslennikov							7	4	2	5	8	3	13	9	88
12	Irek Minnakhmetov	14	13	13	9	5	8	3	Ret	9	8	Ret	Ret			65
13	Pavel Yashin	10	11	17†	17	12	15	DSQ	12	17†	13	10	11	12	7	48
14	Grigoriy Burlutskiy			11	11	7	9	15	7	Ret	14	11	18			44
15	Mikhail Stepanov	13	DNS	10	12	16	12	11	14	10	11	13	Ret	15	11	44
16	Magomed Daghiev	17†	9					Ret	11	15	9	12	12	16	15	29
17	Vitaly Dudin	7	DSQ							Ret	10	DSQ	17	11	12	24
18	Timur Shigabutdinov			Ret	13	14	11	12	9	Ret	17					21
19	Oleg Haruk	11	14	16	18	15	16	16	13	16	18	15	14	18	Ret	14
20	Marat Sharapov	15	12	14	15	13	Ret									11
21	Efim Gantmakher									12	15	14	13			10
22	Andrey Abaluev									14	19	16	16	14	13	7
23	Vladimir Gorlach			15	16	Ret	14			13	Ret					6
24	Thomas Johnson													17	16	0
Pos.	Driver	GRO		SMO		NRG		KAZ		MSC		SOC		GRO		Pts.

Colour	Result
Gold	Winner
Silver	Second place
Bronze	Third place
Green	Points classification
Blue	Non-points classification
Blue	Non-classified finish (NC)
Purple	Retired, not classified (Ret)
Red	Did not qualify (DNQ)
Red	Did not pre-qualify (DNPQ)
Black	Disqualified (DSQ)
White	Did not start (DNS)
White	Withdrew (WD)
White	Race cancelled (C)
Blank	Did not practice (DNP)
Blank	Did not arrive (DNA)
Blank	Excluded (EX)

**Bold** – Pole
Italics – Fastest Lap

† – Drivers did not finish the race, but were classified as they completed over 75% of the race distance.

==== Touring / TCR Russian Touring Car Championship Team's Standing ====
Pos.	Team	GRO		SMO		NRG		KAZ		SMO		MSK		KAZ		Pts.
1	Lukoil Racing Team	4	2	**2**	3	8	1	**1**	4	6	1	2	2	5	5	349
1	Lukoil Racing Team	5	15	5	5	DNS	Ret	7	15	7	2	3	7	13	9	349
2	LADA Sport Rosneft	2	4	7	1	2	4	5	1	11	18†	6	8	**2**	3	303
2	LADA Sport Rosneft	3	10	12	7	11	5	8	10	7	16	9	9	4	Ret	303
3	TAIF Motorsport	**12**	5	1	6	**1**	7	2	2	3	Ret	7	1	6	2	245
3	TAIF Motorsport	15	12	14	15	13	Ret	12	9	3	17	Ret	Ret			245
4	RUMOS AMG Motorsport	9	3	6	4	9	2	10	14	8	11	13	15	9	10	145
4	RUMOS AMG Motorsport	13	DNS	10	12	16	12	11	16	10	20	17†	Ret	15	11	145
5	Carville Racing							14	7	**1**	4	**1**	6	10	8	115
5	Carville Racing							15	Ret	Ret	14	11	18	14	13	115
6	Neva Motorsport	10	11	16	17	12	15	16	12	16	13	13	14	12	7	65
6	Neva Motorsport	11	14	17†	18	15	16	DSQ	13	17†	18	15	Ret	18	Ret	65
7	AKHMAT Racing Team	7	9							15	9	12	12	11	12	49
7	AKHMAT Racing Team	17†	DSQ							Ret	10	DSQ	17	16	15	49
Pos.	Team	GRO		SMO		NRG		KAZ		SMO		MSC		KAZ		Pts.

=== Super Production ===
Pos.	Driver	GRO		SMO		NRG		KAZ		MSC		SOC		GRO		Pts.
1	Mikhail Mityaev	**2**	2	**1**	2	**1**	1	**2**	2	**1**	1	**1**	1	**Ret**	2	310
2	Vladislav Nezvankin	1	1	2	1	3	Ret	1	1	6	DNS	2	2	1	3	256
3	Ilsur Akhmetvaleev	DSQ	4	Ret	4	2	2	3	Ret	2	DSQ	3	4	2	6	163
4	Nikolay Vikhanskiy	4	5	4	3	Ret	4	4	5	5	Ret	4	7	3	4	152
5	Eugeny Meites			3	6	6	5	Ret	6	8	3	5	3	5	1	144
6	Aleksandr Garmash	5	6	Ret	DNS	DSQ	3	5	4	7	DNS	6	5	6	5	112
7	Aleksandr Marushko	3	3	Ret	5	4	7	6	Ret							75
8	Philipp Tuponosov	DNQ	DNQ			5	6	Ret	Ret	Ret	DSQ	7	6	4	Ret	53
9	Dmitry Dobrovolskiy									3	2					36
10	Vladislav Kubasov									4	4					26
11	Mikhail Putyatin							7	3							25
12	Andrey Emelin													DSQ	7	9
13	Vladimir Strelchenko													Ret	Ret	0
Pos.	Driver	GRO		SMO		NRG		KAZ		MSC		SOC		GRO		Pts.

==== Super Production Team's Standing ====
Pos.	Team	GRO		SMO		NRG		KAZ		MSC		SOC		GRO		Pts.
1	LADA Sport Rosneft	1	1	1	1	1	1	1	1	1	1	1	1	1	2	566
1	LADA Sport Rosneft	2	2	2	2	3	Ret	2	2	6	DNS	2	2	Ret	3	566
2	NEFIS Racing Division	3	3	Ret	4	2	2	3	Ret	2	2	3	4	2	6	283
2	NEFIS Racing Division	DSQ	4	Ret	5	4	7	6	Ret	3	DSQ			DSQ	7	283
3	Delphi Technologies RHHCC RT	4	5	4	3	Ret	4	4	4	5	Ret	4	5	3	4	243
3	Delphi Technologies RHHCC RT	5	6	Ret	DNS	DSQ	3	5	5	7	DNS	6	7			243
4	Autoproduct Match TV GTE RT					5	5	Ret	6	8	3	5	3	4	1	171
4	Autoproduct Match TV GTE RT					6	6	Ret	Ret	Ret	DSQ	7	6	5	Ret	171
Pos.	Team	GRO		SMO		NRG		KAZ		MSC		SOC		GRO		Pts.

=== Touring-Light ===
Pos.	Driver	GRO		SMO		NRG		KAZ		MSC		SOC		GRO		Pts.
1	Grigory Burlutskiy	**1**	3	6	5	3	2	Ret	2	7	5	1	3	2	3	218
2	Andrey Maslennikov	DSQ	4	1	3	2	4	Ret	1	3	2	4	4	3	1	217
3	Igor Samsonov	6	1	4	7†	1	7	**1**	5	1	7	3	6	5	4	214
4	Andrey Radoshnov	3	2	3	1	Ret	3	Ret	DNS	**2**	8	2	5	**1**	5	191
5	Vladimir Cherevan	4	DNS	2	4	4	6	4	7	5	3	5	2	4	2	184
6	Ildar Rakhmatullin	2	6	**Ret**	Ret	**Ret**	1	2	4	6	1	Ret	DNS			128
7	Aleksandr Malinin	5	5	5	2	5	5	Ret	3	8	6					109
8	Rodion Shushakov	Ret	DNS			Ret	DNS	3	6	Ret	9			6	6	54
9	Timur Boguslavskiy											**Ret**	1			27
10	Anton Zakharov									4	4					26
11	Nikita Volegov			7	6											19
Pos.	Driver	GRO		SMO		NRG		KAZ		MSC		SOC		GRO		Pts.

==== Touring Light Team's Standing ====
Pos.	Team	GRO		SMO		NRG		KAZ		SMO		MSK		KAZ		Pts.
1	Carville Racing	**1**	2	3	1	3	2	Ret	2	**2**	5	1	3	**1**	3	409
1	Carville Racing	3	3	6	5	Ret	3	Ret	DNS	7	8	2	5	2	5	409
2	Podmoskovie Motorsport	4	4	1	3	2	4	4	1	3	2	4	2	3	1	401
2	Podmoskovie Motorsport	DSQ	DNS	2	4	4	6	Ret	7	5	3	5	4	4	2	401
3	Suvar Motorsport	2	6	5	2	5	1	2	3	6	1	**Ret**	1			243
3	Suvar Motorsport			**Ret**	Ret	**Ret**	5	Ret	4	8	6	Ret	DNS			243
Pos.	Team	GRO		SMO		NRG		KAZ		SMO		MSC		KAZ		Pts.

=== National ===
Pos.	Driver	GRO		SMO		NRG		KAZ		MRW		SOC		GRO		Pts.
1	Pavel Kalmanovich	**2**	7	2	19	**1**	8	3	4	3	1	4	3	6	3	210
2	Gleb Kuznetsov	3	11	1	8	3	1	10	5	1	Ret	**1**	11	9	1	204
3	Andrey Petukhov	7	1	8	1	DSQ	17	7	6	**2**	5	8	8	1	8	170
4	Egor Sanin	1	3	14	9	7	4	9	13	7	Ret	9	1	4	2	156
5	Igor Lvov	5	2	5	14	2	6	4	1	6	2	10	DSQ	15†	14	152
6	Roman Agoshkov	11	6	4	2	Ret	9	5	3	DNS	5	3	6	2	10	144
7	Vasiliy Korablev	9	Ret	3	3	5	5	**2**	7	11	9	12	4	16	9	127
8	Anvar Tutaev	8	Ret	**11**	6	4	3	8	Ret	4	3	15	Ret	5	12	106
9	Denis Mavlanov	12	12	Ret	Ret	9	2	17	17†	DNS	4	2	2			91
10	Ruslan Nafikov	6	4	12	Ret	10	DSQ	1	Ret	8	7	16	9	14	13	88
11	Aleksandr Maslennikov	14	15	13	10	8	Ret	16	8	10	8	5	5	8	6	83
12	Roman Shusharin	18	9	6	4	Ret	11	Ret	10	18	14	11	Ret	12	11	57
13	Mikhail Simonov	4	Ret	23	5			15	16	13	15	Ret	Ret	**3**	7	55
14	Vasiliy Krichevskiy	13	8	9	7	6	Ret	11	14	DSQ	DSQ	7	Ret			53
15	Julia Strukova	15	10	22	13	Ret	DNS			14	10	Ret	7	10	5	44
16	Egor Kiryakov	17	13	15	11	11	20	12	9	5	17	14	13			41
17	Thomas Johnson	16	Ret	10	12	20	16	DNS	11	9	19†	6	Ret			32
18	Aydar Nuriev					Ret	7							7	4	31
19	Vsevolod Gagen							6	2							30
20	Vladislav Seredenko	10	5													17
21	Aleksandr Salnikov	19	17	16	18	18	21	13	12	19	13	13	12			17
22	Andrey Vasiliev	23	19	20	20	14	13	Ret	18†	20	Ret	17	10	13	16	14
23	Efim Gantmakher	Ret	20	7	Ret	19	12									13
24	Oleg Kulakov					13	10									9
25	Ibraghim Akhmadov	21	18					14	DNS	15	12	18	Ret	17	15	9
26	Sergey Drebenets			17	17	15	15			16	11					7
27	Ivan Kostukov													11	Ret	5
28	Arkadiy Illeritskiy									12	16					4
29	Rafael Fattakhov					12	Ret									4
30	Sergey Schegolev			19	21	16	14	18†	15	17	18†					3
30	Yuriy Gavrilov	22	14	18	15	21	18									3
31	Tatiana Dobrynina	20	16	21	16											0
32	Dmitriy Dudarev					17	19									0
33	Khalid Alviev	24	20													0
Pos.	Driver	GRO		SMO		NRG		KAZ		MRW		SOC		GRO		Pts.

==== National Team's Standing ====
Pos.	Team	GRO		SMO		NRG		KAZ		MRW		SOC		GRO		Pts.
1	AG Team	**2**	7	2	6	**1**	3	3	4	3	1	4	3	5	3	316
1	AG Team	8	Ret	11	19	4	8	8	Ret	4	3	15	Ret	6	12	316
2	Rally Academy	3	11	**1**	8	3	1	10	5	1	4	**1**	2	8	1	313
2	Rally Academy	12	12	Ret	Ret	9	2	17	17†	DNS	Ret	2	11	9	6	313
3	AKHMAT Racing Team	6	4	4	2	10	9	1	3	8	6	3	6	2	10	232
3	AKHMAT Racing Team	11	6	12	Ret	Ret	DSQ	5	Ret	DNS	7	16	9	11	Ret	232
4	BRAGIN Racing Team	1	3	14	5	7	4	9	13	7	15	9	1	**3**	2	220
4	BRAGIN Racing Team	4	Ret	23	9	Ret	7	15	16	13	Ret	Ret	Ret	4	7	220
5	Redmond Drive	5	2	5	14	2	6	4	1	6	2	10	7	10	5	193
5	Redmond Drive	19	17	16	18	18	21	13	12	14	10	Ret	DSQ	15†	14	193
6	LADA Sport Rosneft UMMC	7	1	7	1	19	12	7	6	**2**	5	8	8	1	8	183
6	LADA Sport Rosneft UMMC	Ret	20	8	Ret	DSQ	17			17	18†					183
7	B-Tuning Pro Racing Team	14	13	13	10	8	20	12	8	5	8	5	5			106
7	B-Tuning Pro Racing Team	17	15	15	11	11	Ret	16	9	10	17	14	13			106
8	ZENER Energy Team	13	8	9	7	6	Ret	11	10	18	14	7	Ret	12	11	85
8	ZENER Energy Team	15	10	22	13	Ret	DNS	Ret	14	DSQ	DSQ	11	Ret			85
Pos.	Team	GRO		SMO		NRG		KAZ		MRW		SOC		GRO		Pts.

=== National-Junior ===
Pos.	Driver	GRO		SMO		KAZ		MSC		GRO		Pts.
1	Irina Sidorkova	**1**	2	1	1	3	12†	9	8	2	9	163
2	Pavel Kuzminov	8	1	7	7	**1**	3	8	3	3	2	155
3	Petr Plotnikov	6	5	**5**	10	2	6	**1**	6	6	1	140
4	Rustam Fathutdinov	2	12	2	11	5	1	6	11†	**1**	4	139
5	Artem Lyakin	5	3	6	6	4	4	2	4	4	3	136
6	Ilya Doschechkin	4	6	3	3	6	2	4	2	9	8	134
7	Aleksey Sakharov	3	4	4	2	8	5	3	5	8	5	127
8	Sergey Malov	7	8	8	5	7	DSQ	5	1	7	Ret	93
9	Pavel Parshutin	10	10	11	4	12	9	7	7	5	7	79
10	Egor Fokin	9	7	9	9	10	7	10	9	10	6	74
11	Anastasia Grishina	Ret	9	10	8	9	8	11	10	11	11	57
12	Danil Velmyakin	12	11	14	14	11	11					23
13	Dmitriy Prikhnenko	11	12	12	12							17
14	Virsavia Goltsova			13	13	DSQ	10					12
15	Dzhabrail Akhmadov									12	10	10
16	Nikita Dubinin									13	12	7
Pos.	Driver	GRO		SMO		KAZ		MSC		GRO		Pts.

† – Drivers did not finish the race, but were classified as they completed over 75% of the race distance.

==== National-Junior Team's Standing ====
Pos.	Team	GRO		SMO		KAZ		MSC		GRO		Pts.
1	Rally Academy 1	**1**	1	1	1	2	6	'**1'**	6	2	1	315
1	Rally Academy 1	8	2	**5**	10	3	12†	9	8	6	9	315
2	Anton Zakharov's Racing Academy 1	3	4	3	2	6	2	2	4	4	3	276
2	Anton Zakharov's Racing Academy 1	4	6	4	3	8	5	3	5	8	5	276
3	Zorro Gepard	2	7	2	9	5	1	5	1	**1**	4	213
3	Zorro Gepard	9	12	9	11	10	7	10	9	10	6	213
4	Rally Academy 2	6	5	7	7	**1**	3	8	3	3	2	200
4	Rally Academy 2	Ret	9	10	8	9	8	11	10	11	11	200
5	Anton Zakharov's Racing Academy 2	5	3	6	4	4	4	4	2	5	7	200
5	Anton Zakharov's Racing Academy 2	10	10	11	6	12	9	7	7	9	8	200
6	Goltsova Racing	7	8	8	5	7	10			7	Ret	78
6	Goltsova Racing	12	11	13	13	DSQ	DSQ					78
Pos.	Team	GRO		SMO		KAZ		MSC		GRO		Pts.

† – Drivers did not finish the race, but were classified as they completed over 75% of the race distance.
