= Timur Boguslavskiy =

Russian racing driver

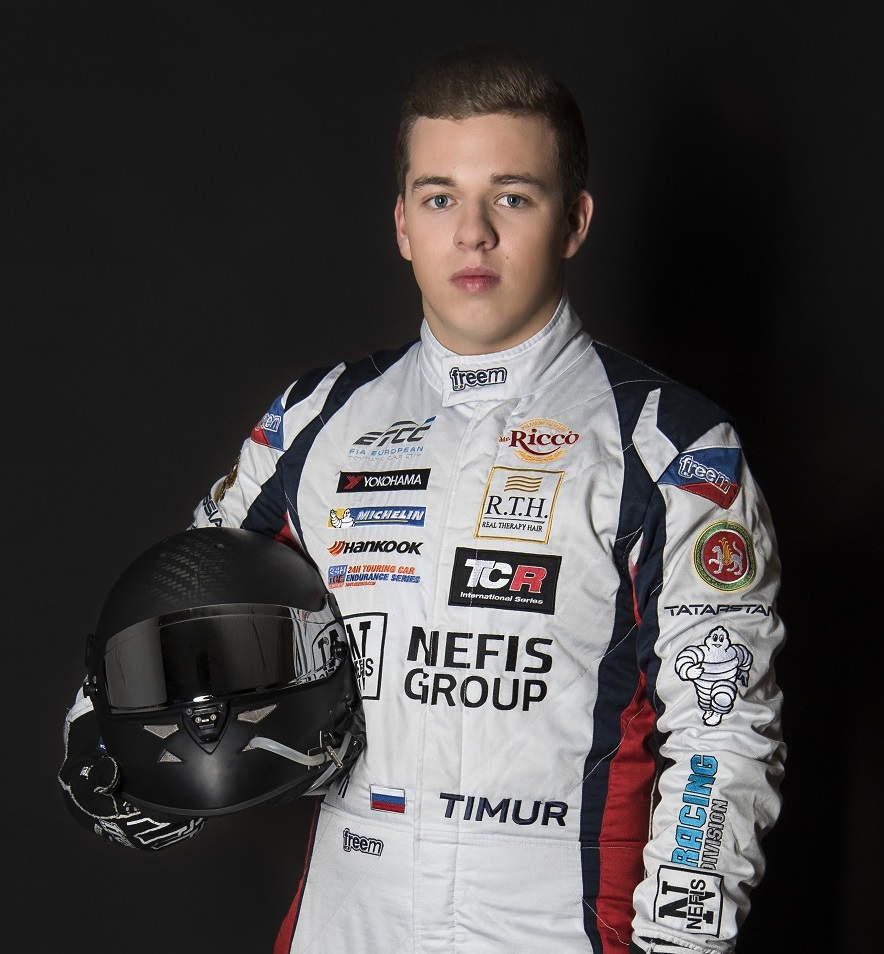
- Boguslavskiy in 2018
- Nationality: Russian
- Born: Timur Irekovich Boguslavskiy; 30 April 2000 (age 26) Kazan, Tatarstan, Russia
- Relatives: Irek Boguslavsky (father)

GT World Challenge Europe Sprint Cup career
- Debut season: 2020
- Current team: AKKodis ASP Team
- Categorisation: FIA Silver
- Car number: 88
- Starts: 44 (44 entries)
- Wins: 13
- Podiums: 29
- Best finish: 1st in 2023
- Finished last season: 1st (2023)

Timur Irekovich Boguslavskiy (Russian: Тиму́р И́рекович Богусла́вский) (born 30 April 2000) is a professional racing driver from Russia, currently competing in GT World Challenge Europe with AKKA ASP. Driving a Mercedes-AMG GT3, Boguslavskiy won the overall series championship in 2020 and 2023.

== Early career ==
Boguslavskiy began his career in 2015 in the Winter Rotax Max Kazan. He also raced in Russian Automobile Federation Rallycross Cup, Russian Rallycross Championship, Canyon Cup and Winter Canyon Cup (circuit racing series in Tatarstan), Tatarstan Circuit Racing Championship and Tatarstan Circuit Racing Cup, Russian Circuit Racing Series prior to his move to Europe. There, he would compete in the Seat Ibiza Cup Italia, Radical Middle East Cup, Renault Clio Cup Italia, European Le Mans Series, and Lamborghini Super Trofeo Europe.

== GT World Challenge career ==
=== 2019 ===
In 2019, Boguslavskiy would turn his attention towards the Blancpain GT Series Endurance Cup, driving a Mercedes-AMG GT3 for the AKKA ASP Team in the Silver Cup category. Partnering Nico Bastian and Felipe Fraga, the Russian would experience a dominant campaign in-class, taking three victories along with two further podiums on his way towards the title, which the team clinched during the penultimate round at the 24 Hours of Spa.

=== 2020 ===
The following year saw Boguslavskiy continue to race in the now renamed GT World Challenge Europe Endurance Cup, entering the Pro class with Fraga and Raffaele Marciello at AKKA ASP, whilst expanding his duties towards the GT World Challenge Europe Sprint Cup, racing alongside Marciello. During a season heavily disrupted by the COVID-19 pandemic, Boguslavskiy and his team would end up fifth in the Endurance Cup, having taken a pair of podiums at the start of the year before seeing their title hopes dissipate owing to a brake issue at the 24 Hours of Spa. In the Sprint Cup, six podiums, including two wins, enabled Boguslavskiy to fight for the championship, though he would eventually finish in second place, four points behind Dries Vanthoor and Charles Weerts.

=== 2021-2022 ===
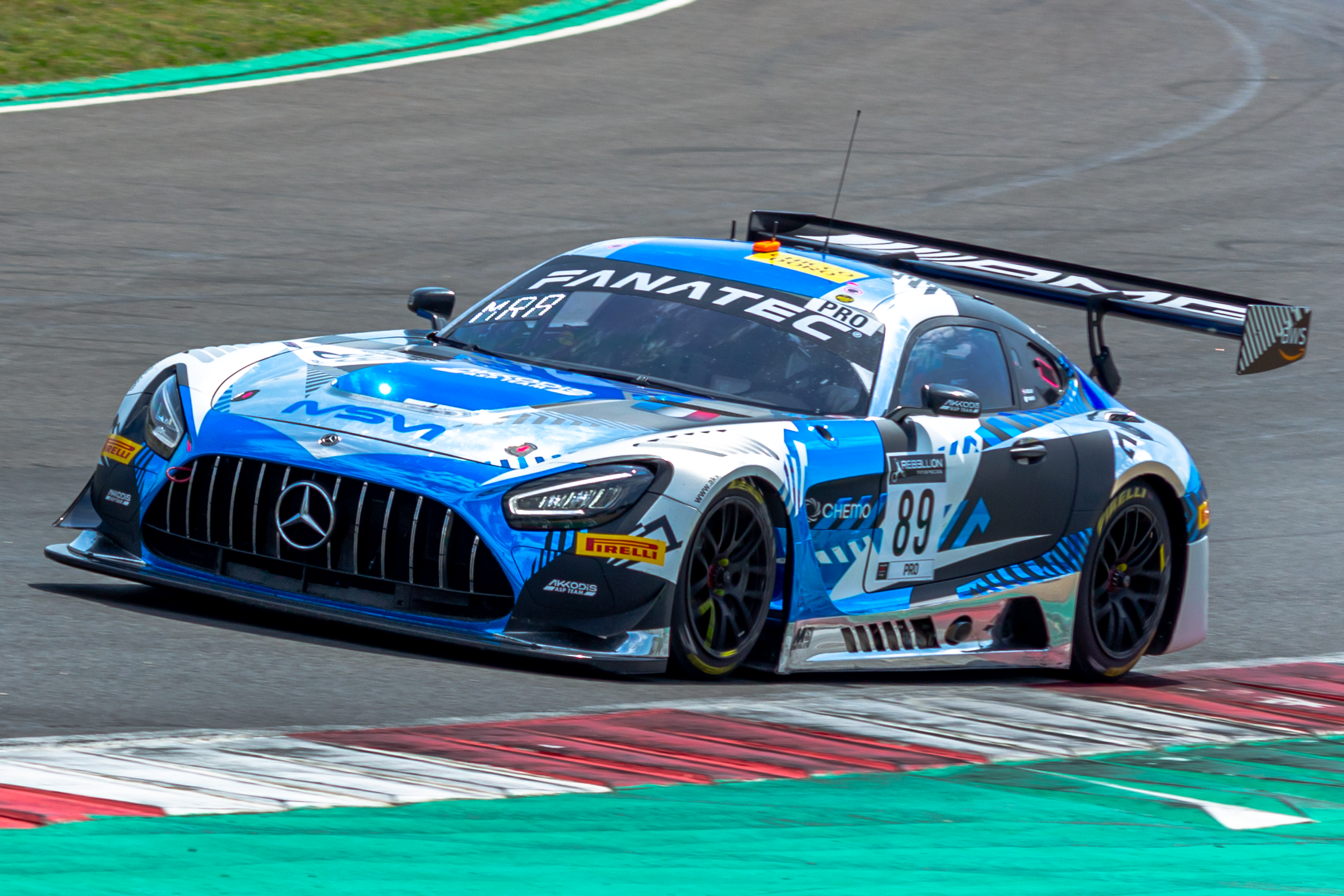
Boguslavkiy won the second race of the 2022 GT World Challenge Europe at the Magny-Cours round.

Boguslavskiy began to focus on the Sprint Cup from 2021 onwards, teaming up with Marciello. The duo failed to win a race that year, though four podiums eventually resulted in a third place finish in the standings. During the 2022 Sprint Cup season, Boguslavskiy and Marciello managed to win three races despite the dominance shown by Team WRT duo Dries Vanthoor and Charles Weerts, taking another runner-up placing overall.

=== 2023 ===
For 2023, Boguslavskiy returned to the Endurance Cup on a full-time basis, partnering previous year's champions Marciello and Jules Gounon. A chaotic season opener at Monza saw a premature end to AKKodis's race, as Boguslavskiy picked up race-ending damage during a misjudged defensive manoeuvre on Christopher Mies. Boguslavskiy made up for his error with a solid stint during the Le Castellet event, returning his car in fourth position before Marciello charged through to take victory. Another clean race, this time at the 24 Hours of Spa, yielded second place, before the Mercedes trio took a victory in Germany, having started from pole position. The team would clinch the title during the final round at Barcelona by finishing fifth, with Boguslavskiy keeping himself in third, ahead of Ferrari's Davide Rigon, during his entire stint. Following the campaign's conclusion, team manager Jérôme Policand stated that the 2023 title win meant more than the previous year's, given that Silver-ranked Boguslavskiy's presence in place of Mercedes-AMG factory driver Daniel Juncadella forced the team to operate on a higher level.

The duo of Boguslavskiy and Marciello began their Sprint Cup season well, winning two of the opening four races as a result of two poles and dominating opening stints from the Swiss driver, with Boguslavskiy keeping the lead during the final stages of race 1 at Brands Hatch and Misano respectively. Despite a retirement in the first race at the Hockenheimring, the duo would win race two, as the Russian managed gear-shifting issues to keep rival Lucas Légeret seven seconds behind him by the checkered flag. Marciello took another pole in Valencia and drove to an early lead, before Boguslavskiy took over and narrowly won ahead of Albert Costa, having lost half a dozen seconds to the Spaniard in the closing laps. This however would not be enough to take the title, with a collision caused by Audi's Lorenzo Patrese ending the team's final race at Zandvoort, therefore crowning the Tresor Orange1 outfit as champions.

== WEC career ==
=== 2024 ===
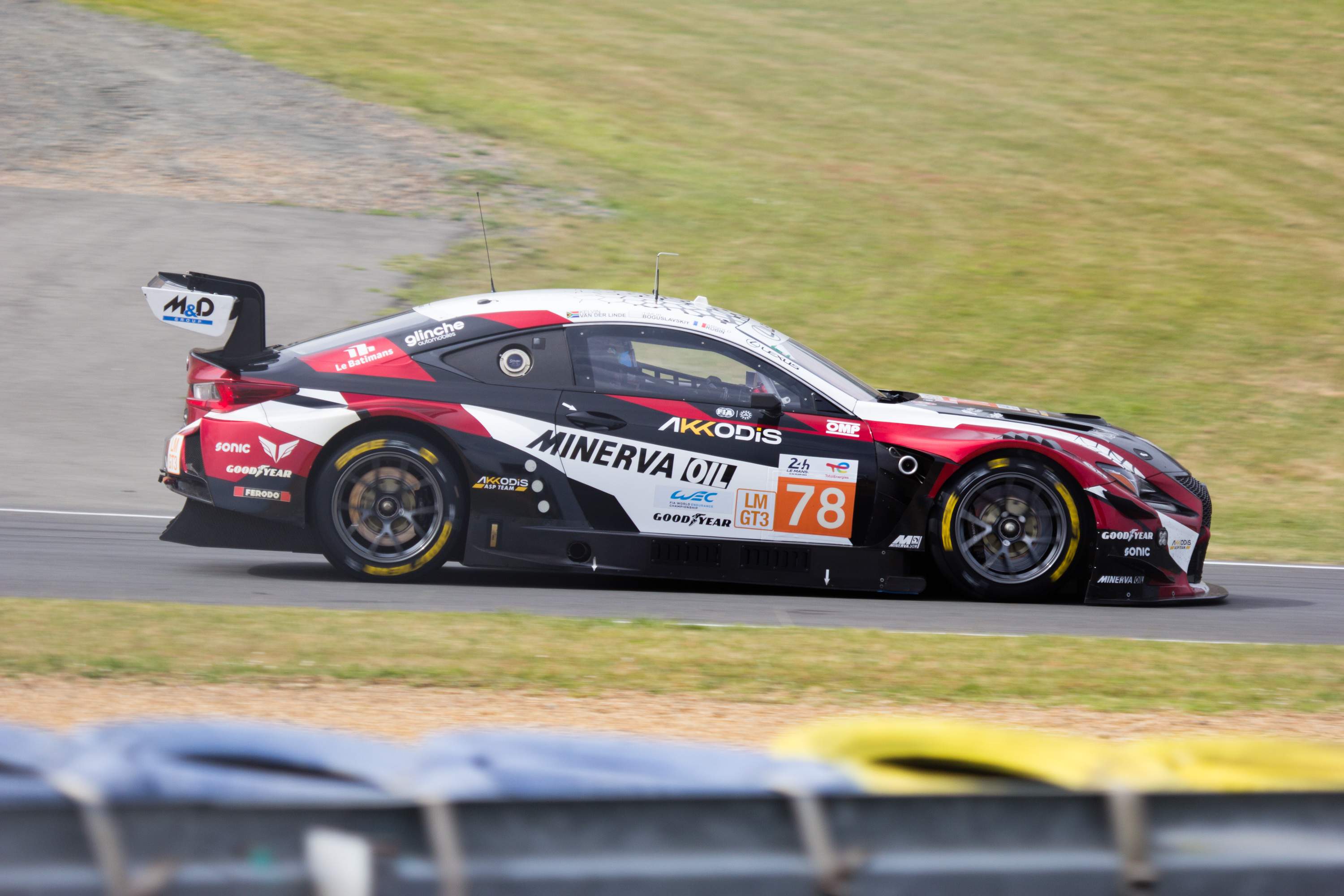
Boguslavskiy's No. 78 Lexus RC F GT3 at the 2024 24 Hours of Le Mans.

With the LMGT3 class replacing the LMGTE category in the FIA World Endurance Championship, Boguslavskiy would move to the WEC for the 2024 season, driving a Lexus RC F GT3 for Akkodis ASP alongside Kelvin van der Linde and bronze driver Arnold Robin. However, the start of the year proved to be a struggle, as a retirement in Qatar was followed by a 14th place in Imola. Boguslavskiy then missed the Spa event due to fever, before returning to finish seventh in class at Le Mans. A few weeks later, Boguslavskiy left the team permanently, citing his focus on "new challenges" as his reason.

=== 2025 ===
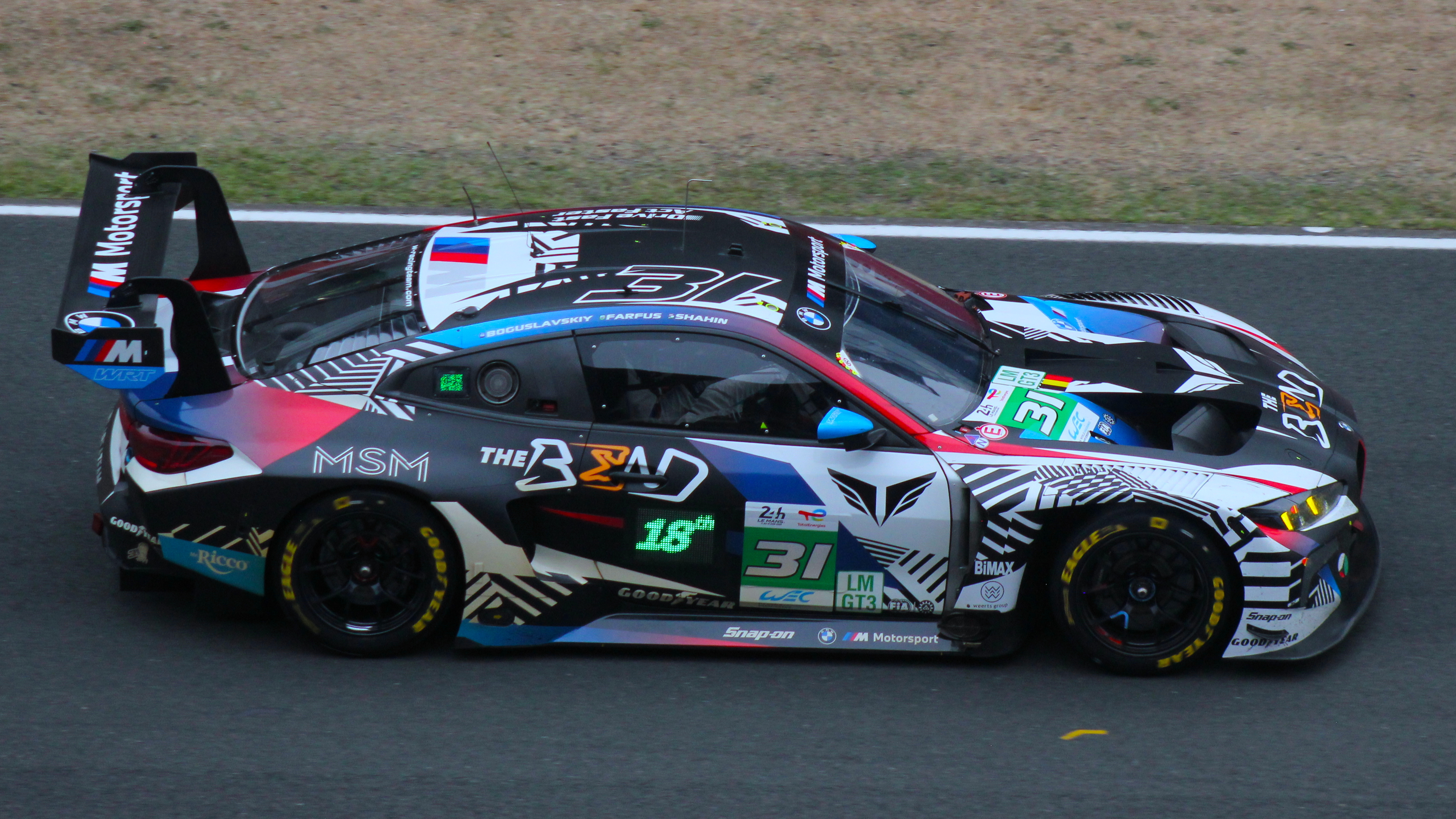
Boguslavskiy's No. 31 car at the 2025 24 Hours of Le Mans

In 2025, Boguslavskiy returned to the WEC, joining Team WRT, alongside Yasser Shahin and Augusto Farfus. He was replaced by Pedro Ebrahim for the São Paulo round. Boguslavskiy and his teammates scored two podiums, those being third places at Qatar and Fuji.

=== 2026 ===
For the 2026 WEC season, Boguslavskiy switched to Porsche-fielding Manthey DK Engineering, where he partnered James Cottingham and Ayhancan Güven.

== Racing record ==
=== Racing career summary ===
Season	Series	Team	Races	Wins	Poles	F/Laps	Podiums	Points	Position
2016	Russian Rallycross Russian Automobile Federation Cup - D2N	NEFIS Motorsport	1	0	-	-	0	15	11th
2016	Canyon Cup - Lada Granta Sport Light	NEFIS Motorsport	4	2	-	-	4	74	**1st**
2016	Canyon Cup Junior - Lada Granta Junior	NEFIS Motorsport	4	4	-	-	4	74	**1st**
2016	Russian Rallycross Championship - National	NEFIS Motorsport	1	0	-	-	0	3	26th
2016	Tatarstan Circuit Racing Championship - National	NEFIS Motorsport	6	2	1	?	3	428	5th
2016	Tatarstan Circuit Racing Cup - National	NEFIS Motorsport	2	1	1	?	1	109	**1st**
2016	Russian Circuit Racing Series - Touring Light	B-Tuning Pro Racing Team	4	0	0	0	0	494	11th
2016	Russian Circuit Racing Series - Touring Light	Suvar Motorsport	2	0	0	0	2	494	11th
2016	Seat Ibiza Cup Italia	Suvar Motorsport	2	0	0	?	0	8	22nd
2017	Winter Canyon Cup - Lada Granta	NEFIS Motorsport	1	1	-	-	1	60	4th
2017	Radical Middle East Cup	AUH Motorsports	2	0	0	?	1	14	20th
2017	Renault Clio Cup Italia	Lema Racing	2	1	0	1	1	0	NC†
2017	Tatarstan Circuit Racing Championship - National	NEFIS Racing Division	6	0	1	?	2	231.2	5th
2017	Canyon Cup - Lada Granta Sport Light	NEFIS Racing Division	2	0	1	?	0	43	17th
2017	Russian Circuit Racing Series - Touring Light	NEFIS Racing Division	14	1	1	2	4	153	5th
2017	European Le Mans Series - LMP3	By Speed Factory	1	0	0	0	0	0.5	29th
2018	Winter Canyon Cup - Lada Granta	NEFIS Racing Division	3	2	-	-	2	168	**2nd**
2018	Tatarstan Winter Ice Racing Championship - А-1600	NEFIS Racing Division	1	0	0	?	0	8	N/A
2018	Radical Middle East Cup	B-Tuning	2	2	1	1	2	40	12th
2018	European Le Mans Series - LMP3	NEFIS by Speed Factory	6	0	0	0	0	29	9th
2018	Le Mans Cup - LMP3	NEFIS by Speed Factory	2	0	0	0	0	3.5	29th
2018	Lamborghini Super Trofeo Europe - Pro-Am	NEFIS by Target Racing	2	0	0	0	0	0	NC†
2018	Lamborghini Super Trofeo Europe -Pro	NEFIS by Target Racing	10	0	0	0	2	0	NC†
2018	Lamborghini Super Trofeo World Final - Pro	Target Racing	2	0	0	0	0	11	7th
2019	Lamborghini Super Trofeo Middle East - Pro	Target Racing	6	6	1	3	6	?	**1st**
2019	24H GT Series - A6	Target Racing	1	0	0	0	0	0	NC†
2019	Blancpain GT Series Endurance Cup	AKKA ASP Team	5	0	0	0	0	23	11th
2019	Blancpain GT World Challenge Europe	AKKA ASP Team	9	0	1	0	6	14	13th
2020	GT World Challenge Europe Endurance Cup	AKKA ASP Team	4	0	0	0	2	52	5th
2020	GT World Challenge Europe Sprint Cup	AKKA ASP Team	10	2	0	0	6	85	**2nd**
2020	Intercontinental GT Challenge	Mercedes-AMG Team AKKA ASP	1	0	1	0	0	0	NC
2021	GT World Challenge Europe Endurance Cup	AKKA ASP Team	1	0	0	0	0	1	32nd
2021	GT World Challenge Europe Sprint Cup	AKKA ASP Team	10	0	0	0	4	61.5	**3rd**
2021	Intercontinental GT Challenge	Mercedes-AMG Team AKKA ASP	3	1	0	0	2	47	**3rd**
2022	GT World Challenge Europe Sprint Cup	AKKodis ASP Team	10	3	0	0	8	111.5	**2nd**
2023	GT World Challenge Europe Endurance Cup	AKKodis ASP Team	5	2	1	0	3	104	**1st**
2023	GT World Challenge Europe Sprint Cup	AKKodis ASP Team	10	4	2	1	4	90.5	**2nd**
2023	Intercontinental GT Challenge	AKKodis ASP Team	1	0	0	0	1	18	19th
2024	FIA World Endurance Championship - LMGT3	Akkodis ASP Team	3	0	0	0	0	16	24th
2024	Italian GT Sprint Championship - GT3 Pro	AF Corse	6	0	0	0	1	27	10th
2025	Middle East Trophy - GT3	The Bend Team WRT	1	1	0	0	1	0	NC†
2025	FIA World Endurance Championship - LMGT3	The Bend Team WRT	7	0	0	0	2	49	10th
2026	FIA World Endurance Championship - LMGT3	Manthey DK Engineering	3	0	0	0	0	30*	14th*

^{*} Season still in progress.

=== Complete Russian Circuit Racing Series results ===
(key) (Races in bold indicate pole position) (Races in italics indicate fastest lap)

Year	Class	Entrant	Car	1	2	3	4	5	6	7	8	9	10	11	12	13	14	Rank	Points
2016	Touring Light	B-tuning	Volkswagen Polo	SMO; 1	SMO; 2	NRG; 1	NRG; 2	GRO; 1	GRO; 2	SOC; 1; 8	SOC; 2; 10	MRW; 1; 5	MRW; 2; 11	SMO; 1	SMO; 2			11th	494
2016	Touring Light	Suvar Motorsport	Renault Twingo Sport													KAZ; 1; 2	KAZ; 2; 2	11th	494
2017	Touring Light	NEFIS Racing Division	Peugeot 208	GRO; 1; 2	GRO; 2; 6	SMO; 1; 1	SMO; 2; 9	NRG; 1; 4	NRG; 2; 3	KAZ; 1; 7	KAZ; 2; 6	SMO; 1; 2	SMO; 2; 11	MRW; 1; 11	MRW; 2; 11	**KAZ**; **1**; **Ret**	KAZ; 2; 9	5th	153

=== Complete European Le Mans Series results ===
Year	Entrant	Class	Chassis	Engine	1	2	3	4	5	6	Rank	Points
2017	By Speed Factory	LMP3	Ligier JS P3	Nissan VK50VE 5.0 L V8	SIL	MNZ	RBR	LEC	SPA	ALG; 12	29th	0.5
2018	NEFIS by Speed Factory	LMP3	Ligier JS P3	Nissan VK50VE 5.0 L V8	LEC; 16	MNZ; 6	RBR; 6	SIL; Ret	SPA; 10	ALG; 4	9th	27.5

=== Complete Lamborghini Super Trofeo Europe results ===
Year	Entrant	Class	Car	1	2	3	4	5	6	7	8	9	10	11	12	Rank	Points
2018	NEFIS by Target Racing	Pro-Am	Lamborghini Huracan Super Trofeo EVO	MNZ; 1 Ret	MNZ; 2; 7											10th*	4*
2018	NEFIS by Target Racing	Pro	Lamborghini Huracan Super Trofeo EVO			SIL; 1; 7	SIL; 2; 5	MIS; 1	MIS; 2	SPA; 1	SPA; 2	NÜR; 1	NÜR; 2	VLL; 1	VLL; 2	11th*	10*

=== Complete GT World Challenge Europe results ===
==== GT World Challenge Europe Endurance Cup ====
(key) (Races in bold indicate pole position) (Races in italics indicate fastest lap)

Year	Team	Car	Class	1	2	3	4	5	6	7	Pos.	Points
2019	Mercedes-AMG Team AKKA ASP	Mercedes-AMG GT3	Silver	**MNZ**; 4	SIL; 10	LEC; 11	SPA; 6H; 14	SPA; 12H; 14	SPA; 24H; 17	**CAT**; 5	1st	142
2020	AKKA ASP Team	Mercedes-AMG GT3 Evo	Pro	IMO; 3	NÜR; 2	SPA; 6H; 1	SPA; 12H; 37	**SPA**; **24H**; Ret	LEC; 18		5th	52
2021	AKKA ASP Team	Mercedes-AMG GT3 Evo	Pro	MNZ	LEC	SPA; 6H; 26	SPA; 12H; 14	SPA; 24H; 10	NÜR	CAT	32nd	1
2023	AKKodis ASP Team	Mercedes-AMG GT3 Evo	Pro	MNZ; Ret	LEC; 1	SPA; 6H; 3	SPA; 12H; 2	**SPA**; **24H**; 2	**NÜR**; 1	CAT; 5	1st	104

^{*}Season still in progress.

==== GT World Challenge Europe Sprint Cup ====
(key) (Races in bold indicate pole position) (Races in italics indicate fastest lap)

Year	Team	Car	Class	1	2	3	4	5	6	7	8	9	10	Pos.	Points
2019	AKKA ASP Team	Mercedes-AMG GT3	Silver	BRH; 1; 15	**BRH**; **2**; 18	MIS; 1; 5	**MIS**; **2**; 26	**ZAN**; **1**; 26	ZAN; 2 DNS	NÜR; 1; 10	NÜR; 2; 10	HUN; 1; 13	**HUN**; **2**; 5	4th	87
2020	AKKA ASP Team	Mercedes-AMG GT3 Evo	Pro	MIS; 1; 8	**MIS**; **2**; 1	MIS; 3; 6	MAG; 1; 7	MAG; 2; 2	ZAN; 1; 11	ZAN; 2; 3	CAT; 1; 3	CAT; 2; 3	**CAT**; **3**; 1	2nd	85
2021	AKKA ASP Team	Mercedes-AMG GT3 Evo	Pro	MAG; 1; 5	MAG; 2; 3	ZAN; 1; 2	**ZAN**; **2**; 25	MIS; 1; 5	MIS; 2; 2	BRH; 1; 17	**BRH**; **2**; 6	VAL; 1; 3	VAL; 2; 18	3rd	61.5
2022	AKKodis ASP Team	Mercedes-AMG GT3 Evo	Pro	BRH; 1; 3	**BRH**; **2**; 1	MAG; 1; 2	**MAG**; **2**; 1	ZAN; 1; 23	**ZAN**; **2**; 1	MIS; 1; 2	MIS; 2; 2	VAL; 1; 7	**VAL**; **2**; 3	2nd	111.5
2023	AKKodis ASP Team	Mercedes-AMG GT3 Evo	Pro	**BRH**; **1**; 1	BRH; 2; 6	**MIS**; **1**; 1	MIS; 2; 4	HOC; 1 Ret	HOC; 2; 1	VAL; 1; 1	VAL; 2; 7	ZAN; 1; 4	ZAN; 2 Ret	2nd	90.5

^{*} Season still in progress.

=== Complete FIA World Endurance Championship results ===
(key) (Races in bold indicate pole position) (Races in italics indicate fastest lap)

Year	Entrant	Class	Car	Engine	1	2	3	4	5	6	7	8	Rank	Points
2024	Akkodis ASP Team	LMGT3	Lexus RC F GT3	Lexus 2UR-GSE 5.0 L V8	QAT; Ret	IMO; 14	SPA	LMS; 6	SÃO	COA	FUJ	BHR	24th	16
2025	The Bend Team WRT	LMGT3	BMW M4 GT3 Evo	BMW P58 3.0 L I6 t	QAT; 3	IMO; 12	SPA; Ret	LMS; Ret	SÃO	COA; 9	FUJ; 3	BHR; 7	10th	49
2026	Manthey DK Engineering	LMGT3	Porsche 911 GT3 R (992.2)	Porsche M97/80 4.2 L Flat-6	IMO; 4	SPA; 7	LMS; Ret	SÃO; 4	COA	FUJ	CAT	MNZ	14th*	30*

^{*} Season still in progress.

=== Complete 24 Hours of Le Mans results ===
Year	Team	Co-Drivers	Car	Class	Laps	Pos.	Class Pos.
2024	(France) Akkodis ASP Team	(France) Arnold Robin (South Africa) Kelvin van der Linde	Lexus RC F GT3	LMGT3	279	34th	7th
2025	(Belgium) The Bend Team WRT	(Brazil) Augusto Farfus (Australia) Yasser Shahin	BMW M4 GT3 Evo	LMGT3	168	DNF	DNF
2026	(Germany) Manthey DK Engineering	(United Kingdom) James Cottingham (Turkey) Ayhancan Güven	Porsche 911 GT3 R (992.2)	LMGT3	254	DNF	DNF

Sporting positions
Preceded by Alex Fontana; Mikaël Grenier; Adrian Zaugg	Blancpain GT Series Endurance Cup; Silver Cup Champion; 2019; With: Nico Bastian & Felipe Fraga	Succeeded by Alex MacDowall; Patrick Kujala; Frederik Schandorff (GT World Challenge Europe Endurance Cup)
Preceded by Andrea Caldarelli; Marco Mapelli (Blancpain GT Series)	GT World Challenge Europe; Champion; 2020	Succeeded by Dries Vanthoor; Charles Weerts
Preceded by Raffaele Marciello; Jules Gounon; Daniel Juncadella	GT World Challenge Europe Endurance Cup; Champion; 2023; With: Raffaele Marciello & Jules Gounon	Succeeded by Incumbent
Preceded by Raffaele Marciello	GT World Challenge Europe; Champion; 2023; With: Raffaele Marciello	Succeeded by Incumbent
