= 2019 FIA Motorsport Games Touring Car Cup =

Motorsport event

Race details
Date	1–3 November
Official name	FIA Motorsport Games
Location	Campagnano di Roma, Italy
Course	Permanent circuit 4.085 km (2.538 mi)
Distance	Qualifying; Two 30 minutes Race 1; 25 minutes +1 lap Race 2; 30 minutes +1 lap
- Race 1

Pole
Driver	(Germany) Luca Engstler	Team Germany
Time	1:56.941

Fastest lap
Driver	(Russia) Klim Gavrilov	Team Russia
Time	1:41.609

Podium
First	(Russia) Klim Gavrilov	Team Russia
Second	(Slovakia) Maťo Homola	Team Slovakia
Third	(Belgium) Gilles Magnus	Team Belgium
- Race 2

Pole
Driver	(Belgium) Gilles Magnus	Team Belgium
Time	1:40.235

Fastest lap
Driver	(Russia) Klim Gavrilov	Team Russia
Time	1:43.113

Podium
First	(Belgium) Gilles Magnus	Team Belgium
Second	(Russia) Klim Gavrilov	Team Russia
Third	(Netherlands) Tom Coronel	Team Netherlands

Medalists
1st place, gold medalist(s)	(Russia) Klim Gavrilov	Team Russia
2nd place, silver medalist(s)	(Belgium) Gilles Magnus	Team Belgium
3rd place, bronze medalist(s)	(Slovakia) Maťo Homola	Team Slovakia

The FIA Motorsport Games Touring Car Cup was the first FIA Motorsport Games Touring Car Cup, held at ACI Vallelunga Circuit, Italy on 1 November to 3 November 2019. The race was contested with TCR Touring Car spec cars. The event was part of the 2019 FIA Motorsport Games.

== Entry list ==
Team	Entrant	Car	No.	Drivers
Team Lithuania	Lithuania National Motorsport Team	Volkswagen Golf GTI TCR	5	Julius Adomavičius
(United Kingdom) Team UK	Cobra Sport AmD AutoAid/RCIB Insurance	MG 6 X-Power TCR	6	Rory Butcher
Team Germany	Hyundai Team Engstler	Hyundai i30 N TCR	8	Luca Engstler
Team Norway	Insight Racing	Alfa Romeo Giulietta Veloce TCR	10	Kristian Sætheren
Team Spain	Racing Team Spain	Peugeot 308 TCR	11	Gonzalo de Andrés
Team Russia	Team Russia	Audi RS 3 LMS TCR	14	Klim Gavrilov
Team Hungary	NK Race and Image KFT	Alfa Romeo Giulietta TCR	15	Norbert Kiss
Team Belgium	RACB National Team	Audi RS 3 LMS TCR	16	Gilles Magnus
Team China	MG Xpower Racing Team	MG 6 X-Power TCR	18	Zhen Dong Zhang
(United States) Team USA	Target	Hyundai i30 N TCR	21	Mason Filippi
Team Latvia	Latvian National Motorsport Team	Audi RS 3 LMS TCR	25	Valters Zviedris
Team Sweden	Target	Hyundai i30 N TCR	26	Jessica Bäckman
Team France	John Filippi	CUPRA León TCR	27	John Filippi
Team Netherlands	Boutsen Ginion Racing	Honda Civic Type R TCR (FK8)	33	Tom Coronel
Team Kuwait	Comtoyou Racing Team	Audi RS 3 LMS TCR	35	Salem Al Nusif
Team New Zealand	Comtoyou Racing Team	Audi RS 3 LMS TCR	55	Faine Kahia
Team Czech Republic	K2 Engine ACCR Czech Team	Hyundai i30 N TCR	59	Dušan Kouřil Jr.
Team Italy	Pit Lane Competizioni di Remelli Roberto	Audi RS 3 LMS TCR	69	Enrico Bettera
Team Slovakia	BRC Racing Team	Hyundai i30 N TCR	70	Maťo Homola
Team Hong Kong	Honda Racing	Honda Civic Type R TCR (FK8)	88	Jim Ka To

== Results ==
=== Qualifying 1 ===
Pos	No.	Driver	Team	Time	Gap	Grid
1	8	Luca Engstler	Team Germany	1:56.941	—	1
2	14	Klim Gavrilov	Team Russia	1:57.172	+0.231	2
3	70	Mat'o Homola	Team Slovakia	1:57.437	+0.496	3
4	88	Jim Ka To	Team Hong Kong	1:57.621	+0.680	4
5	6	Rory Butcher	(United Kingdom) Team UK	1:57.644	+0.703	5
6	33	Tom Coronel	Team Netherlands	1:57.718	+0.777	6
7	27	John Filippi	Team France	1:57.804	+0.863	7
8	16	Gilles Magnus	Team Belgium	1:57.977	+1.036	8
9	59	Dušan Kouřil Jr.	Team Czech Republic	1:58.173	+1.232	9
10	25	Valters Zviedris	Team Latvia	1:58.550	+1.609	10
11	15	Norbert Kiss	Team Hungary	1:58.753	+1.812	11
12	69	Enrico Bettera	Team Italy	1:58.855	+1.914	12
13	55	Faine Kahia	Team New Zealand	1:59.058	+2.117	13
14	26	Jessica Bäckman	Team Sweden	1:59.235	+2.294	14
15	21	Mason Filippi	(United States) Team USA	1:59.594	+2.653	15
16	11	Gonzalo de Andrés	Team Spain	2:00.386	+3.445	16
17	5	Julius Adomavičius	Team Lithuania	2:01.101	+4.160	17
18	18	Zhendong Zhang	Team China	2:01.127	+4.186	18
19	10	Kristian Sætheren	Team Norway	2:01.743	+4.802	19
20	35	Salem Al Nusif	Team Kuwait	2:02.881	+5.940	20

=== Qualifying 2 ===
Pos	No.	Driver	Team	Time	Gap	Grid
1	16	Gilles Magnus	Team Belgium	1:40.235	—	1
2	14	Klim Gavrilov	Team Russia	1:40.730	+0.495	2
3	33	Tom Coronel	Team Netherlands	1:41.011	+0.776	3
4	70	Mat'o Homola	Team Slovakia	1:41.213	+0.978	4
5	55	Faine Kahia	Team New Zealand	1:41.526	+1.291	5
6	26	Jessica Bäckman	Team Sweden	1:41.604	+1.369	6
7	27	John Filippi	Team France	1:41.643	+1.408	7
8	88	Jim Ka To	Team Hong Kong	1:41.701	+1.466	8
9	69	Enrico Bettera	Team Italy	1:42.407	+2.172	9
10	6	Rory Butcher	(United Kingdom) Team UK	1:42.422	+2.187	10
11	21	Mason Filippi	(United States) Team USA	1:42.467	+2.232	11
12	35	Salem Al Nusif	Team Kuwait	1:42.467	+2.232	12
13	59	Dušan Kouřil Jr.	Team Czech Republic	1:42.658	+2.423	13
14	15	Norbert Kiss	Team Hungary	1:42.864	+2.629	14
15	10	Kristian Sætheren	Team Norway	1:43.069	+2.834	15
16	18	Zhendong Zhang	Team China	1:43.349	+3.114	16
17	5	Julius Adomavičius	Team Lithuania	1:43.388	+3.153	17
18	25	Valters Zviedris	Team Latvia	1:43.688	+3.453	18
DSQ	11	Gonzalo de Andrés	Team Spain	no time	no time	19
DNS	8	Luca Engstler	Team Germany	no time	no time	20

=== Race 1 ===
Pos	No.	Driver	Team	Laps	Time/Retired	Grid	Points
1	14	Klim Gavrilov	Team Russia	15	27:30.808	2	25
2	70	Mat'o Homola	Team Slovakia	15	+5.864	3	18
3	16	Gilles Magnus	Team Belgium	15	+12.785	8	15
4	27	John Filippi	Team France	15	+18.065	7	12
5	59	Dušan Kouřil Jr.	Team Czech Republic	15	+18.637	9	10
6	55	Faine Kahia	Team New Zealand	15	+19.925	13	8
7	26	Jessica Bäckman	Team Sweden	15	+20.225	14	6
8	33	Tom Coronel	Team Netherlands	15	+20.676	6	4
9	69	Enrico Bettera	Team Italy	15	+25.562	12	2
10	88	Jim Ka To	Team Hong Kong	15	+26.568	4	1
11	21	Mason Filippi	(United States) Team USA	15	+29.947	15	
12	5	Julius Adomavičius	Team Lithuania	15	+30.364	17	
13	15	Norbert Kiss	Team Hungary	15	+32.777	11	
14	18	Zhendong Zhang	Team China	15	+36.350	18	
15	25	Valters Zviedris	Team Latvia	15	+37.001	10	
16	6	Rory Butcher	(United Kingdom) Team UK	12	+3 laps	5	
Ret	8	Luca Engstler	Team Germany	6	Retired	1	
Ret	10	Kristian Sætheren	Team Norway	0	Retired	19	
Ret	35	Salem Al Nusif	Team Kuwait	0	Retired	20	
DNS	11	Gonzalo de Andrés	Team Spain	0	Did not start	16	

=== Race 2 ===
Pos	No.	Driver	Team	Laps	Time/Retired	Grid	Points
1	16	Gilles Magnus	Team Belgium	15	31:06.800	1	30
2	14	Klim Gavrilov	Team Russia	15	+2.081	2	22
3	33	Tom Coronel	Team Netherlands	15	+2.181	3	16
4	6	Rory Butcher	(United Kingdom) Team UK	15	+2.317	10	13
5	70	Mat'o Homola	Team Slovakia	15	+2.566	4	11
6	27	John Filippi	Team France	15	+2.972	7	10
7	26	Jessica Bäckman	Team Sweden	15	+4.160	6	9
8	5	Julius Adomavičius	Team Lithuania	15	+6.286	17	8
9	88	Jim Ka To	Team Hong Kong	15	+7.387	8	7
10	25	Valters Zviedris	Team Latvia	15	+8.773	18	6
11	15	Norbert Kiss	Team Hungary	15	+8.869	14	5
12	10	Kristian Sætheren	Team Norway	15	+9.075	15	4
13	11	Gonzalo de Andrés	Team Spain	15	+10.137	19	3
14	35	Salem Al Nusif	Team Kuwait	15	+11.170	12	2
15	59	Dušan Kouřil Jr.	Team Czech Republic	14	+1 lap	13	1
16	18	Zhendong Zhang	Team China	11	+4 laps	16	
Ret	55	Faine Kahia	Team New Zealand	4	Retired	5	
Ret	69	Enrico Bettera	Team Italy	0	Retired	9	
Ret	8	Luca Engstler	Team Germany	0	Retired	20	
DNS	21	Mason Filippi	(United States) Team USA	0	Did not start	11	

== Cup standings after the races ==
Pos.	Driver	Team	Points
1st place, gold medalist(s)	Klim Gavrilov	Team Russia	47
2nd place, silver medalist(s)	Gilles Magnus	Team Belgium	45
3rd place, bronze medalist(s)	Mat'o Homola	Team Slovakia	29
4	John Filippi	Team France	22
5	Tom Coronel	Team Netherlands	20
6	Jessica Bäckman	Team Sweden	15
7	Rory Butcher	(United Kingdom) Team UK	13
8	Dušan Kouřil Jr.	Team Czech Republic	11
9	Faine Kahia	Team New Zealand	8
10	Julius Adomavičius	Team Lithuania	8
11	Jim Ka To	Team Hong Kong	8
12	Valters Zviedris	Team Latvia	6
13	Norbert Kiss	Team Hungary	5
14	Kristian Sætheren	Team Norway	4
15	Gonzalo de Andrés	Team Spain	3
16	Enrico Bettera	Team Italy	2
17	Salem Al Nusif	Team Kuwait	2
18	Mason Filippi	(United States) Team USA	0
19	Zhendong Zhang	Team China	0
20	Luca Engstler	Team Germany	0
