= Fort Grozny Autodrom =

Motorsport complex in Grozny, Russia

- Location: Grozny, Chechnya, Russia
- Coordinates: 43°18′18″N 45°39′36″E
- Capacity: 1600
- Opened: 24 August 2015; 10 years ago
- Architect: Moscow Circuit Design Group
- Major events: Current: Russian Circuit Racing Series (2016–present); SMP F4 Championship (2019, 2025–present); Former: Formula Masters Russia (2015)

Full 'A' Circuit (2015–present)
- Length: 3.086 km (1.918 mi)
- Turns: 10
- Race lap record: 1:13.431 ( (Russia) Alexander Smolyar, BR Engineering BR03, 2025, CN)

Alternative 'B' Circuit (2015–present)
- Length: 3.072 km (1.909 mi)
- Turns: 11
- Race lap record: 1:23.567 ( (Russia) Kirill Ladygin, Lada Vesta TCR, 2018, TCR)

Fort Grozny (Russian: Крепость Грозная) is a motorsport complex and the largest in the North Caucasus, located in Grozny, Chechnya, Russia.

== Description ==
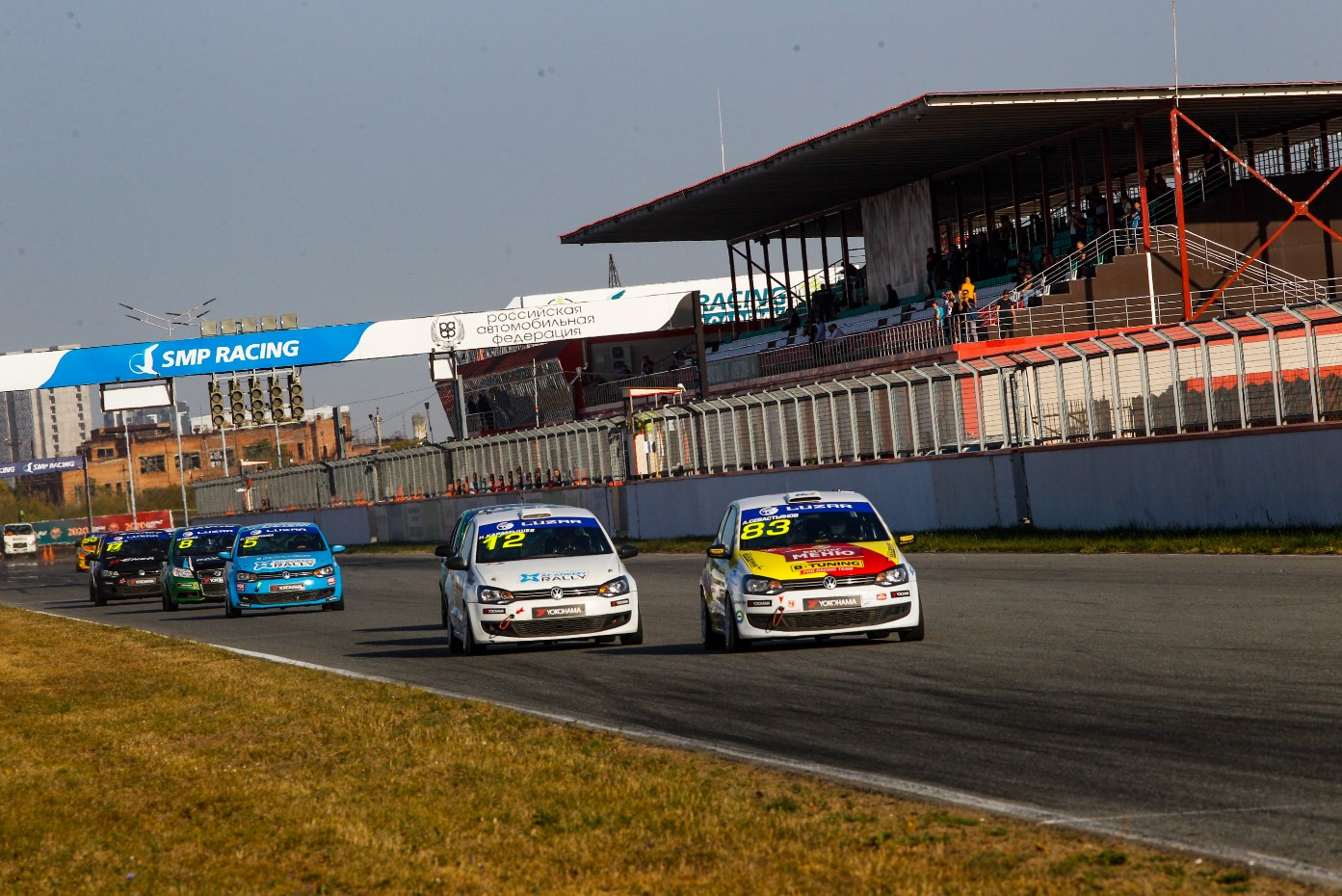
Russian Circuit Racing Series race at Fort Grozny in 2020.

The route was laid in the Zavodskoy district of Grozny, on the site of a former oil refinery. The area of the autodrome is 60 ha (150 acres). On this area, there are tracks for karting (1.314 km (0.816 mi)), circuit races (3.086 km (1.918 mi)), autocross (1.250 km (0.777 mi)), jeep trial, pair races, drift and drag racing (1.000 km (0.621 mi)). There is a "Safari" lane for motorcycles and off-road vehicles with obstacles up to 4 meters high and 30-degree inclines. The autodrome is able to host international competitions. The autodrome is designed for 1600 spectators.

== Competition ==
On average, up to 70 events of various levels were held at the autodrome per year as of 2015. Among the all-Russian competitions, Formula Masters Russia in the 2015 season and stages of the Russian Circuit Racing Series since 2016 have been held at the circuit.

== Lap records ==
As of October 2025, the fastest official race lap records at the Fort Grozny Autodrom are listed as:

Category	Time	Driver	Vehicle	Event
Full 'A' Circuit (2015–present): 3.086 km (1.918 mi)
Group CN	1:13.431	Alexander Smolyar	BR Engineering BR03	2025 Akhmat Race
Formula Abarth	1:14.516	Denis Kornejev	Tatuus FA010	2015 Fort Grozny Formula Masters Russia round
Formula 4	1:15.575	Pavel Bulantsev	Tatuus F4-T014	2019 Fort Grozny SMP F4 round
GT3	1:16.148	Konstantin Tereshchenko	Mercedes-AMG GT3	2023 Akhmat Race
GT4	1:20.768	Sergey Titarenko	Toyota GR Supra GT4 Evo	2024 1st Fort Grozny RCRS round
TCR Touring Car	1:20.982	Mikhail Simonov	Cupra León Competición TCR	2024 1st Fort Grozny RCRS round
Alternative 'B' Circuit (2015–present): 3.072 km (1.909 mi)
TCR Touring Car	1:23.567	Kirill Ladygin	Lada Vesta TCR	2018 1st Fort Grozny RCRS round
