= Alessandro Giardelli =

Italian racing driver (born 2002)

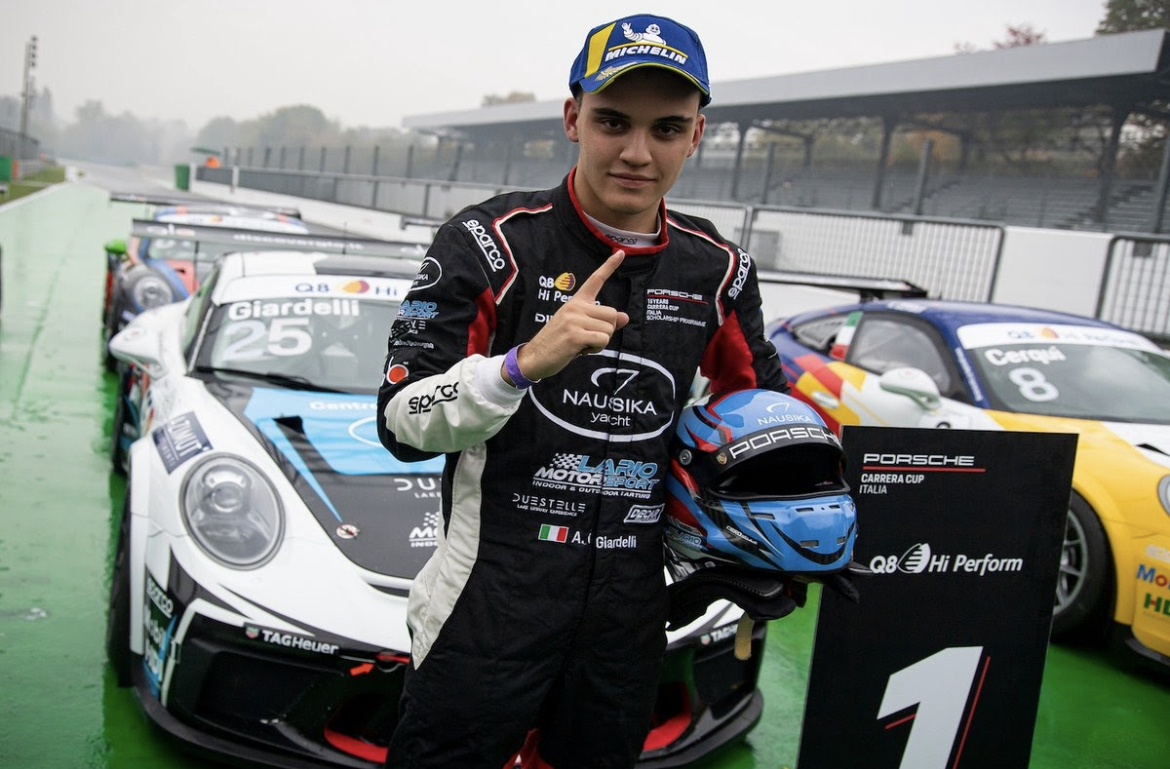
- Giardelli in 2021 after the victory in Monza Circuit
- Nationality: Italy
- Born: 5 October 2002 (age 24) Seriate, Italy

Porsche Carrera Cup Italy career
- Debut season: 2021
- Categorisation: FIA Silver
- Car number: 25
- Best finish: 2nd in 2021

Previous series
- 2020: TCR Italy Touring Car Championship

Alessandro Giardelli (born 5 October 2002) is an Italian professional racing driver. He finished second in the 2021 Porsche Carrera Cup Italy season and participated in the Porsche Junior Shootout for national Carrera Cup drivers. In 2015, Giardelli won the KFJunior class of the Italian Karting Championship.

== Career ==
=== Karting ===
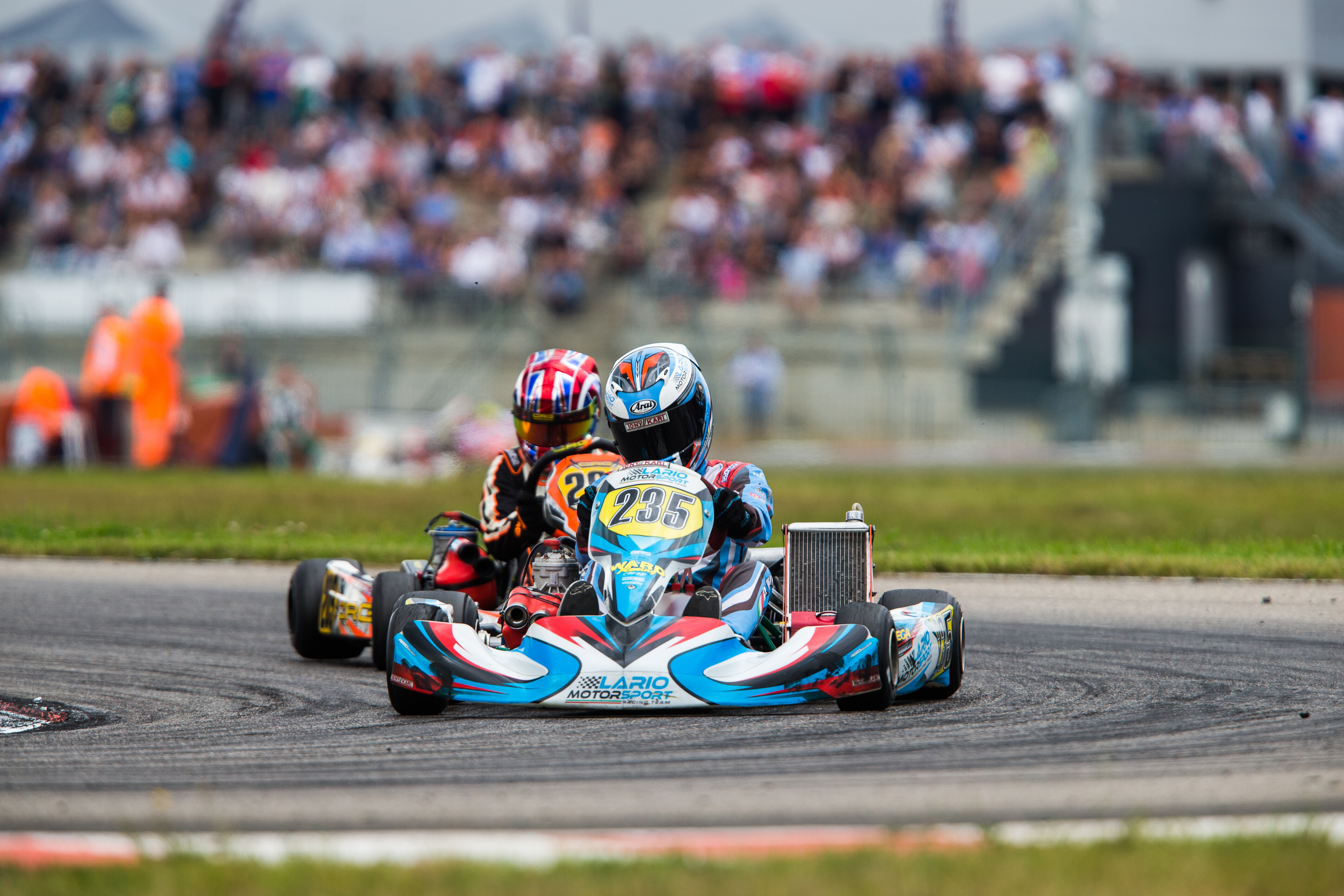
Giardelli leading the Group during 2016 Karting European Championship.

Giardelli began his career in 2012. His accomplishments include first place in the Italian Karting Championship, third place at the WSK Night Edition, eighth place and fifth place in the WSK Champions Cup, fourth place in the WSK Final Cup, first place in the Rok Cup Italy, fifth place in the Rok Cup International final, fifth place in the Andrea Margutti Trophy, second place in the industry trophy, first place in the 500 miles of Granja Viana, third place in the race of Karting European Championship, and first place in a race of Karting World Cup. He competed for the CRG (kart manufacturer) official team, and Tony Kart and also racing for the official team Lariomotorsport.

=== Touring car racing ===
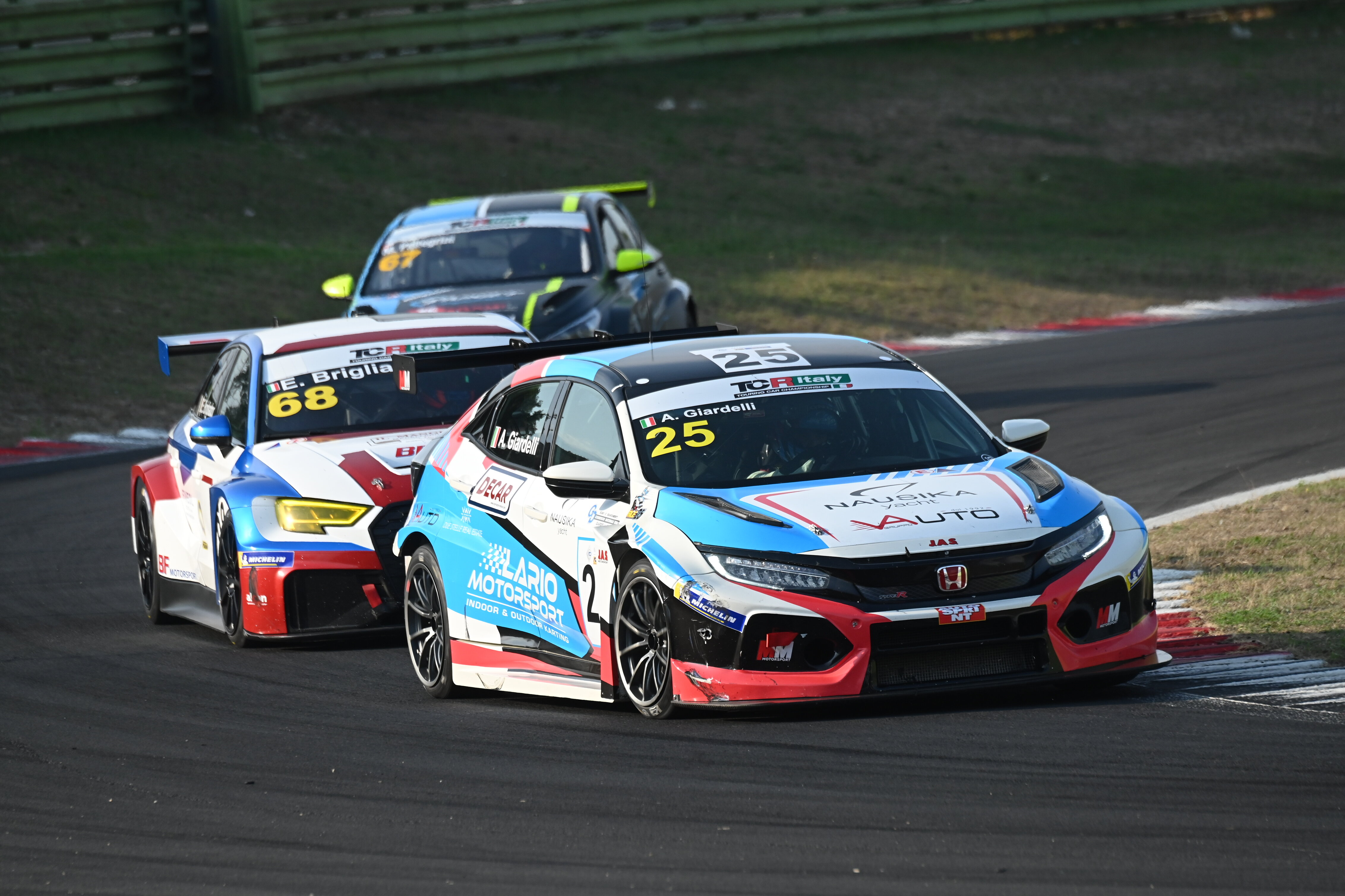
Giardelli driving a Honda Civic during a 2020 TCR Italy Touring Car Championship race at Vallelunga.

Giardelli moved to cars in 2020, racing in the TCR Italy Touring Car Championship. He initially signed with Élite Motorsport, but began the season with B.D. Racing. In the first round at Mugello, Giardelli finished ninth overall (third in the DSG class) in Race 1 and fifth overall (first in DSG) in Race 2.

After two DNFs in the second round at Misano, Giardelli moved to MM Motorsport. At Imola, he finished 11th in Race 1 and retired from Race 2 after a crash. In the fourth round at Vallelunga, he started second and maintained his position to finish as runner-up. In Race 2, Giardelli started seventh on the inverted grid and finished second overall.

In Race 1 at Monza, Giardelli finished eighth after a collision with another driver, who was later penalized. In Race 2, Giardelli suffered a punctured tire following another collision, forcing him to pit for repairs and ultimately finishing 12th. He did not participate in the final race of the championship at Autodromo Enzo e Dino Ferrari.

=== GT racing ===
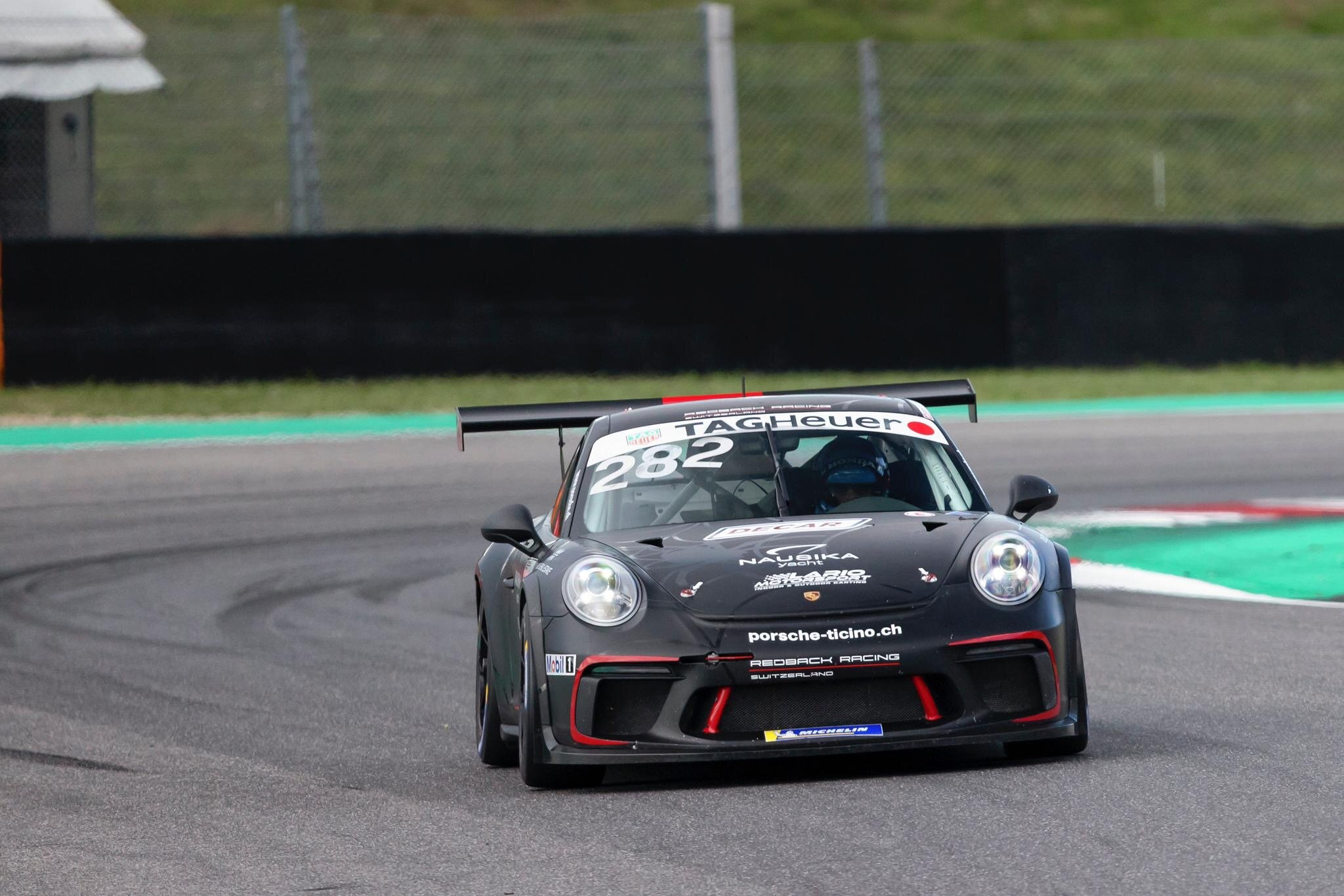
Giardelli in his debut race in Porsche Carrera Cup Suisse 2020 driving the Porsche 911 GT3 Cup on the Mugello Circuit.

In September 2020, Giardelli drove in the Porsche Sports Cup Suisse at the Mugello Circuit, winning the Open GT - Class 40 race.

In 2021, Giardelli signed with Dinamic Motorsport, driving primarily in the Porsche Carrera Cup Italia. In May, he made his debut with the team in the Italian GT Championship during the first race of the championship at Monza, finishing second and fourth in the two GT Cup class races.

In Carrera Cup Italia, Giardelli finished third in the second race of the first round at Misano, the top finisher among drivers in the Porsche Scholarship Program. At Mugello, he finished third and second, and held third place in the championship.

In July, Giardelli replaced injured teammate Simone Iaquinta in the Porsche Supercup round at the Hungaroring, finishing tenth on his debut.

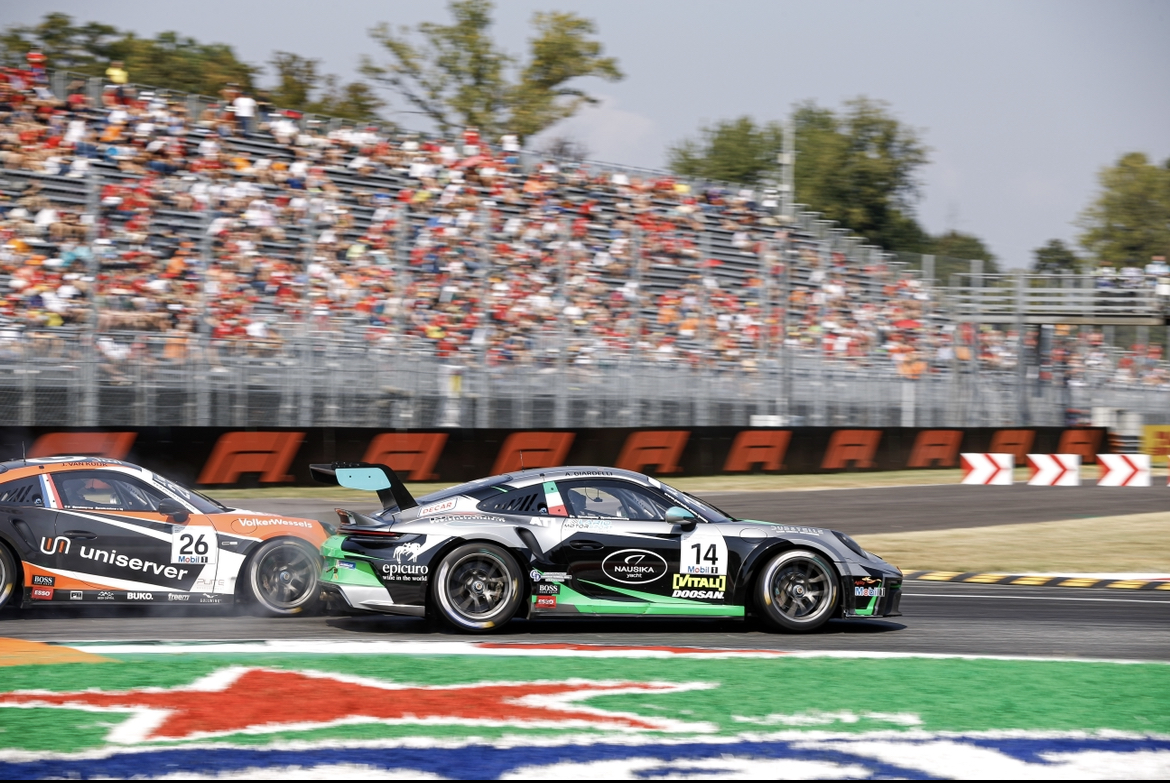
Giardelli during a race of the 2021 Italian Grand Prix in the Porsche Supercup at the Monza.

After a pair of third place finishes in Imola, Giardelli entered the Vallelunga round as the championship leader. He secured the second-fastest time in free practice, and finished sixth in Race 1 and second in Race 2 to maintain his championship lead. A pair of eighth place finishes at Franciacorta left Giardelli second in the championship entering the final round at Monza. For race 1, he won pole position and the race, held under rainy conditions. Starting sixth on the inverted grid for Race 2, Girardelli finished 11th after contact. Despite this, Giardelli concluded the championship in second place overall and as the top driver in the Porsche Scholarship Program during his debut season.

In November 2021, Giardelli participated in the Porsche International Shootout at Motorland Aragón as the Carrera Cup Italia representative.

For 2022, Giardelli was initially announced for Dinamic Motorsport's GT World Challenge Europe Silver Cup campaign. However, he instead returned to Porsche Carrera Cup Italia with the Ebimotors team. Giardelli completed seven of the 12 races and placed 18th in the championship before left the team.

== Personal life ==
Giardelli's brother, Luca Giardelli, is also a racing driver. In 2013, the Giardelli family opened a track named Lariomotorsport and established a karting team under the same name.. Besides his racing career, Giardelli is involved in family business activities.

== Racing record ==
=== Career summary ===
Season	Series	Team	Races	Wins	Poles	F/Laps	Podiums	Points	Position
2020	TCR Italy Touring Car Championship	B.D. Racing	4	0	0	0	0	72	8th
2020	TCR Italy Touring Car Championship	MM Motorsport	6	0	0	0	2	72	8th
2020	Coppa Italia turismo	B.D. Racing	2	0	0	0	2	0	NC†
2020	Porsche GT3 Cup Challenge Suisse	Centro Porsche Ticino	1	1	1	1	1	0	NC†
2021	Porsche Carrera Cup Italia	Dinamic Motorsport	12	1	1	1	7	206	2nd
2021	Italian GT Sprint Championship - GT Cup	Dinamic Motorsport	2	0	1	0	1	0	NC†
2021	Porsche Supercup	Dinamic Motorsport	3	0	0	0	0	0	NC†
2022	Porsche Carrera Cup Italia	Ebimotors	6	0	0	0	0	23	18th
2022	Italian GT Championship - GT Cup	Ebimotors							

^{†} As Giardelli was a guest driver, he was ineligible for points.
^{*} Season still in progress.

== Motorsports career results ==
=== Complete TCR Italy Touring Car Championship DSG ===
(key) (Races in bold indicate pole position) (Races in italics indicate fastest lap)

Year	Entrant	Car	1	2	3	4	5	6	7	8	9	10	11	12	Pos	Points
2020	B.D. Racing	CUPRA León TCR DSG	MUG; 1; 3	MUG; 2; 1	MIS; 1; 10	MIS; 2; 12	IMO	IMO	VAL	VAL	MNZ	MNZ	IMO	IMO	9th	52

=== Complete TCR Italy Touring Car Championship ===
(key) (Races in bold indicate pole position) (Races in italics indicate fastest lap)

Year	Entrant	Car	1	2	3	4	5	6	7	8	9	10	11	12	Pos	Points
2020	MM Motorsport	Honda Civic Type R TCR	MUG	MUG	MIS	MIS	IMO; 1; 11	IMO; 2 Ret	VAL; 1; 2	VAL; 2; 2	MNZ; 1; 8	MNZ; 2; 12	IMO	IMO	8th	72

=== Complete Porsche Carrera Cup Italy ===
(key) (Races in bold indicate pole position) (Races in italics indicate fastest lap)

Year	Entrant	Car	1	2	3	4	5	6	7	8	9	10	11	12	Pos	Points
2021	Dinamic Motorsport	Porsche 911 GT3 Cup	MIS; 1; 5	MIS; 2; 3	MUG; 1; 3	MUG; 2; 2	IMO; 1; 3	IMO; 2; 3	VAL; 1; 6	VAL; 2; 2	FRA; 1; 8	FRA; 2; 8	MNZ; 1; 1	MNZ; 2; 11	2nd	206
2022	Ebimotors	Porsche 911 GT3 Cup	IMO; 1; 11	IMO; 2; 11	MIS; 1	MIS; 2	MUG; 1	MUG; 2	VAL; 1	VAL; 2	MNZ; 1	MNZ; 2	MUG; 1	MUG; 2	11th*	10*

^{*} Season still in progress.

=== Complete Porsche Supercup results ===
(key) (Races in bold indicate pole position) (Races in italics indicate fastest lap)

Year	Team	1	2	3	4	5	6	7	8	Pos.	Points
2021	Dinamic Motorsport	MON	RBR	RBR	HUN; 10	SPA	ZND	MNZ; 22	MNZ; 20	NC†	0

* Season still in progress.
