= 2021 Porsche Carrera Cup Italia =

Motor racing competition

The 2021 Porsche Carrera Cup Italia season was the fifteenth Porsche Carrera Cup Italy season. It began on 5 June at Misano World Circuit Marco Simoncelli and ended on 31 October in Autodromo Nazionale di Monza, after six events with two races at each event.

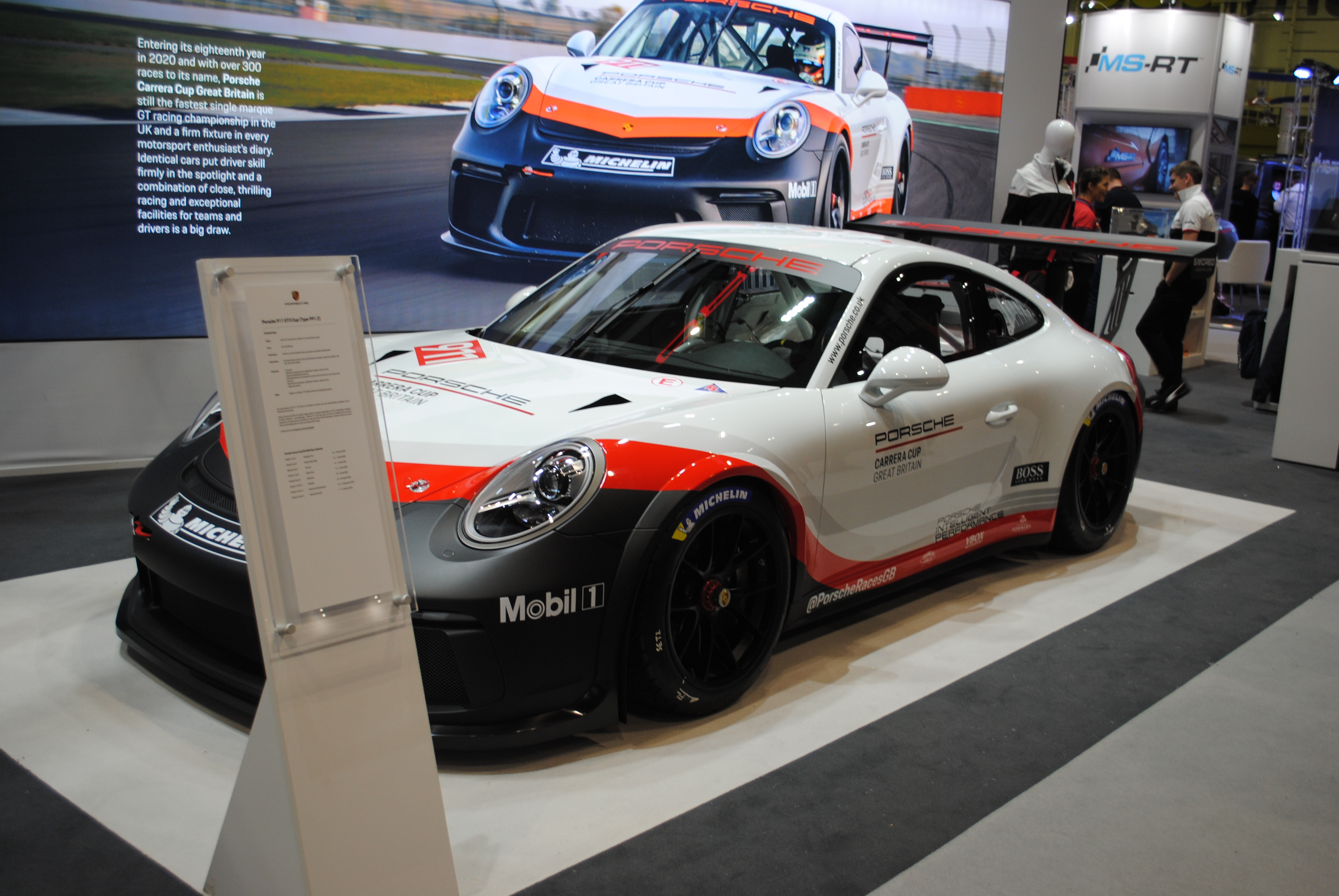
The car used in the championship, the Porsche 991 GT3 Cup.

== Teams and drivers ==
Team	No.	Drivers	Class	Rounds
(Italy) Bonaldi Motorsport	3	(Italy) Marzio Moretti		All
(Italy) Ghinzani Arco Motorsport	4	(Italy) Leonardo Moncini		All
(Italy) Ghinzani Arco Motorsport	8	(Italy) Alberto Cerqui		All
(Italy) Ghinzani Arco Motorsport	18	(Italy) Daniele Cazzaniga		All
(Italy) Ghinzani Arco Motorsport	27	(Italy) Federico Malvestiti		All
(Italy) Ombra Racing	11	(Italy) Leonardo Caglioni		All
(Italy) Ombra Racing	12	(Lithuania) Dziugas Tovilavicius		All
(Italy) Ombra Racing	15	(Italy) Aldo Festante		All
(Italy) Ombra Racing	39	(Italy) Stefano Gattuso		All
(Italy) Enrico Fulgenzi Racing	17	(Italy) Enrico Fulgenzi		3–12
(Italy) Enrico Fulgenzi Racing	90	(Canada) Ray Calvin	M	3–4
(Italy) Enrico Fulgenzi Racing	91	(Luxembourg) Gabriel Rindone	M	3–4, 7–8
(Italy) Enrico Fulgenzi Racing	92	(Japan) Akatsu Shintaro	M	5
(Italy) Dinamic Motorsport	25	(Italy) Alessandro Giardelli		All
(Italy) Dinamic Motorsport	28	(Italy) Giorgio Amati		All
(Italy) Dinamic Motorsport	38	(Italy) Simone Iaquinta		1–2, 5–10
(Italy) Dinamic Motorsport	38	(Italy) Lodovico Laurini		6
(Italy) AB Racing	30	(Italy) Benedetto Strignano		All
(Italy) AB Racing	50	(Italy) Francesco Maria Fenici	M	All
(Italy) AB Racing	88	(Italy) Piergiacomo Randazzo	M	1–4, 6
(Ukraine) Tsunami R.T.	32	(Italy) Gianmarco Quaresmini		All
(Ukraine) Tsunami R.T.	33	(Italy) Giammarco Levorato		All
(Ukraine) Tsunami R.T.	67	(Italy) Alex de Giacomi	M	1–2, 4–6
(Ukraine) Tsunami R.T.	77	(Italy) Paolo Biolghini	S	2
(Ukraine) Tsunami R.T.	77	(Italy) Carlo Scarpellini	S	2
(Ukraine) Tsunami R.T.	79	(Italy) Johannes Zelger	M	6
(San Marino) GDL Racing	40	(North Macedonia) Risto Vukov		All
(Italy) Ebimotors	51	(Italy) Paolo Gnemmi	M	6
(Italy) Ebimotors	54	(Italy) Luigi Peroni	M	All
(Italy) Ebimotors	66	(Italy) Paolo Venerosi Pesciolini	M	All
(Italy) Ebimotors	70	(Italy) Gianluca Giorgi	M	All
(Italy) Ebimotors	71	(Italy) Gianluici Piccioli	M	All
(Italy) Ebimotors	80	(Italy) Pietro Negra	S	6
(San Marino) Team Malucelli	59	(Italy) Marco Parisini	S	All
(San Marino) Team Malucelli	60	(San Marino) Marco Galassi	M	All
(San Marino) Team Malucelli	69	(Italy) Massimiliano Montagnese	S	All
(San Marino) Team Malucelli	99	(Italy) Massimiliano Donzelli	M	All
(Italy) Krypton Motorsport	72	(Italy) Diego Locanto	M	All
(Italy) ZRS Motorsport	78	(Italy) Davide Scannicchio	S	1–5
(Italy) Raptor Engineering	81	(Italy) Marco Cassara	M	All
(Germany) Profildoors by Huber Racing	82	(Italy) Andreas Corradina	M	1–3, 5
(Italy) The Driving Experience	85	(Italy) Matteo Rovida	M	3
(Italy) The Driving Experience	85	(Italy) Alessandro Poli	M	5

Icon	Class
M	Michelin Cup
S	Silver Cup

== Race calendar and results ==
Each round includes two races one on Saturday and one in Sunday. The grid of the first race is defined by a qualifying session; for the second race, the starting grid is determined by the results of the first race with the first six positions reversed. The calendar was announced on 15 December 2020. On January 21 2021 it was announced that the Mugello race will be brought forward by a week.

Round	Circuit	Date	Pole position	Fastest lap	Winning driver	Winning team
1	(Italy) Misano World Circuit Marco Simoncelli, Misano Adriatico	5 June	(Italy) Alberto Cerqui	(Italy) Alberto Cerqui	(Italy) Alberto Cerqui	(Italy) Ghinzani Arco Motorsport
2	(Italy) Misano World Circuit Marco Simoncelli, Misano Adriatico	6 June	(Italy) Giammarco Levorato	(Italy) Marzio Moretti	(Italy) Simone Iaquinta	(Italy) Dinamic Motorsport
3	(Italy) Autodromo Internazionale del Mugello, Scarperia	3 July	(Italy) Gianmarco Quaresmini	(Italy) Alessandro Giardelli	(Italy) Alberto Cerqui	(Italy) Ghinzani Arco Motorsport
4	(Italy) Autodromo Internazionale del Mugello, Scarperia	4 July	(Italy) Marzio Moretti	(Italy) Aldo Festante	(Italy) Marzio Moretti	(Italy) Bonaldi Motorsport
5	(Italy) Autodromo Enzo e Dino Ferrari, Imola	24 July	(Italy) Alessandro Giardelli	(Italy) Aldo Festante	(Italy) Giorgio Amati	(Italy) Dinamic Motorsport
6	(Italy) Autodromo Enzo e Dino Ferrari, Imola	25 July	(Italy) Giammarco Levorato	(Italy) Benedetto Strignano	(Italy) Leonardo Caglioni	(Italy) Ombra Racing
7	(Italy) ACI Vallelunga Circuit, Campagnano	18 September	(Italy) Leonardo Caglioni	(Italy) Simone Iaquinta	(Italy) Leonardo Caglioni	(Italy) Ombra Racing
8	(Italy) ACI Vallelunga Circuit, Campagnano	19 September	(Italy) Alessandro Giardelli	(Italy) Aldo Festante	(Italy) Enrico Fulgenzi	(Italy) Enrico Fulgenzi Racing
9	(Italy) Autodromo di Franciacorta, Franciacorta	2 October	(Italy) Enrico Fulgenzi	(Italy) Stefano Gattuso	(Italy) Enrico Fulgenzi	(Italy) Enrico Fulgenzi Racing
10	(Italy) Autodromo di Franciacorta, Franciacorta	3 October	(Italy) Giorgio Amati	(Italy) Aldo Festante	(Italy) Giorgo Amati	(Italy) Dinamic Motorsport
11	(Italy) Autodromo Nazionale Monza, Monza	30 October	(Italy) Alessandro Giardelli	(Italy) Alessandro Giardelli	(Italy) Alessandro Giardelli	(Italy) Dinamic Motorsport
12	(Italy) Autodromo Nazionale Monza, Monza	31 October	(Italy) Marzio Moretti	(Italy) Lodovico Laurini	(Italy) Alberto Cerqui	(Italy) Ghinzani Arco Motorsport

== Championship standings ==
=== Scoring system ===
Points were awarded to the top fifteen classified finishers in all races. The pole-sitter in Race 1 also received three points, and one point was given to the driver who set the fastest lap in both races. No extra points were awarded to the pole-sitter in Race 2, as the grid for Race 2 was set by reversing the top six finishers of Race 1.

Race 1 points

Points were awarded to the top 15 classified finishers, three points were given for qualifying on Pole Position, and one point was awarded to the driver who set the fastest lap in the race.

Position	**1st**	**2nd**	**3rd**	**4th**	**5th**	**6th**	**7th**	**8th**	**9th**	**10th**	**11th**	**12th**	**13th**	**14th**	**15th**	**PP**	**FL**
Points	30	24	21	18	15	12	10	8	7	6	5	4	3	2	1	3	1

Race 2 points

Points were awarded to the top 15 classified finishers, and one point was awarded to the driver who set the fastest lap in the race.

Position	**1st**	**2nd**	**3rd**	**4th**	**5th**	**6th**	**7th**	**8th**	**9th**	**10th**	**11th**	**12th**	**13th**	**14th**	**15th**	**FL**
Points	26	21	18	16	14	12	10	8	7	6	5	4	3	2	1	1

=== Drivers' Championship ===
Pos.	Driver	MIS1 (Italy)	MIS2 (Italy)	MUG1 (Italy)	MUG2 (Italy)	IMO1 (Italy)	IMO2 (Italy)	VAL1 (Italy)	VAL2 (Italy)	FRA1 (Italy)	FRA2 (Italy)	MNZ1 (Italy)	MNZ2 (Italy)	Points
1	(Italy) Alberto Cerqui	**1**	4	1	4	18	8	3	3	4	6	3	1	220
2	(Italy) Alessandro Giardelli	5	3	3	2	**3**	3	6	**2**	8	8	**1**	11	201
3	(Italy) Gianmarco Quaresmini	3	2	**2**	3	7	4	2	5	NC	NC	2	NC	175
4	(Italy) Marzio Moretti	4	29	6	**1**	4	2	7	7	2	NC	6	**2**	173
5	(Italy) Enrico Fulgenzi	DNS	DNS	14	12	2	6	4	1	**1**	2	8	4	162
6	(Italy) Leonardo Caglioni	7	6	9	8	5	1	**1**	4	5	NC	11	6	159
7	(Italy) Giorgio Amati	13	9	8	6	1	7	NC	12	6	**1**	4	5	144
8	(Italy) Simone Iaquinta	2	1	DNS	DNS	8	NC	Ret	NC	3	3	DNS	DNS	98
9	(Italy) Benedetto Strignano	16	14	10	7	11	5	8	9	11	NC	10	3	82
10	(Italy) Stefano Gattuso	10	23	5	5	10	11	16	8	10	5	12	NC	79
11	(North Macedonia) Risto Vukov	9	7	13	13	9	13	12	10	9	4	7	28	76
12	(Italy) Daniele Cazzaniga	8	8	7	10	NC	15	5	13	13	13	5	NC	72
13	(Italy) Aldo Festante	Ret	10	4	11	14	10	11	6	15	12	13	12	70
14	(Italy) Giammarco Levorato	9	**15**	Ret	15	17	**15**	9	6	15	15	15	15	65
15	(Italy) Leonardo Moncini	12	13	Ret	14	21	19	13	14	15	15	15	15	44
16	(Italy) Federico Malvestiti	10	22	14	15	11	23	15	15	15	15	15	15	35
17	(Lithuania) Dziugas Tovilavicius	16	10	12	13	25	27	Ret	21	15	15	15	15	26
18	(Italy) Marco Cassara	Ret	Ret	DNS	15	13	13	15	23	15	15	15	15	21
19	(Italy) Alex De Giacomi	13	15	Ret	19	15	15	15	15	15	15	15	15	18
20	(Italy) Francesco Maria Fenici	15	24	15	19	22	23	19	15	15	15	15	15	12
21	(Italy) Lodovico Laurini	Ret	17	17	18	24	25	18	22	Ret	Ret	Ret	Ret	9
22	(Italy) Andreas Corradina	Ret	14	19	20	29	Ret	25	27	Ret	Ret	Ret	Ret	3
23	(Italy) Gianluca Giorgio	Ret	20	18	24	Ret	Ret	Ret	28	Ret	Ret	Ret	Ret	3
24	(Italy) Alessandro Pioli	Ret	23	20	22	26	26	24	24	Ret	Ret	Ret	Ret	3
25	(Italy) Piergiacomo Randazzo	19	18	22	25	26	29	29	25	Ret	Ret	Ret	Ret	1
26	(Italy) Gianluigi Picciolo	18	21	21	27	Ret	28	27	30	Ret	Ret	Ret	Ret	1

Colour	Result
Gold	Winner
Silver	Second place
Bronze	Third place
Green	Points classification
Blue	Non-points classification
Blue	Non-classified finish (NC)
Purple	Retired, not classified (Ret)
Red	Did not qualify (DNQ)
Red	Did not pre-qualify (DNPQ)
Black	Disqualified (DSQ)
White	Did not start (DNS)
White	Withdrew (WD)
White	Race cancelled (C)
Blank	Did not practice (DNP)
Blank	Did not arrive (DNA)
Blank	Excluded (EX)

**Bold** – Pole
Italics – Fastest Lap

Notes

† – Driver did not finish the race, but were classified as they completed over 75% of the race distance.
