= Marzio Moretti =

Italian racing driver (born 2002)

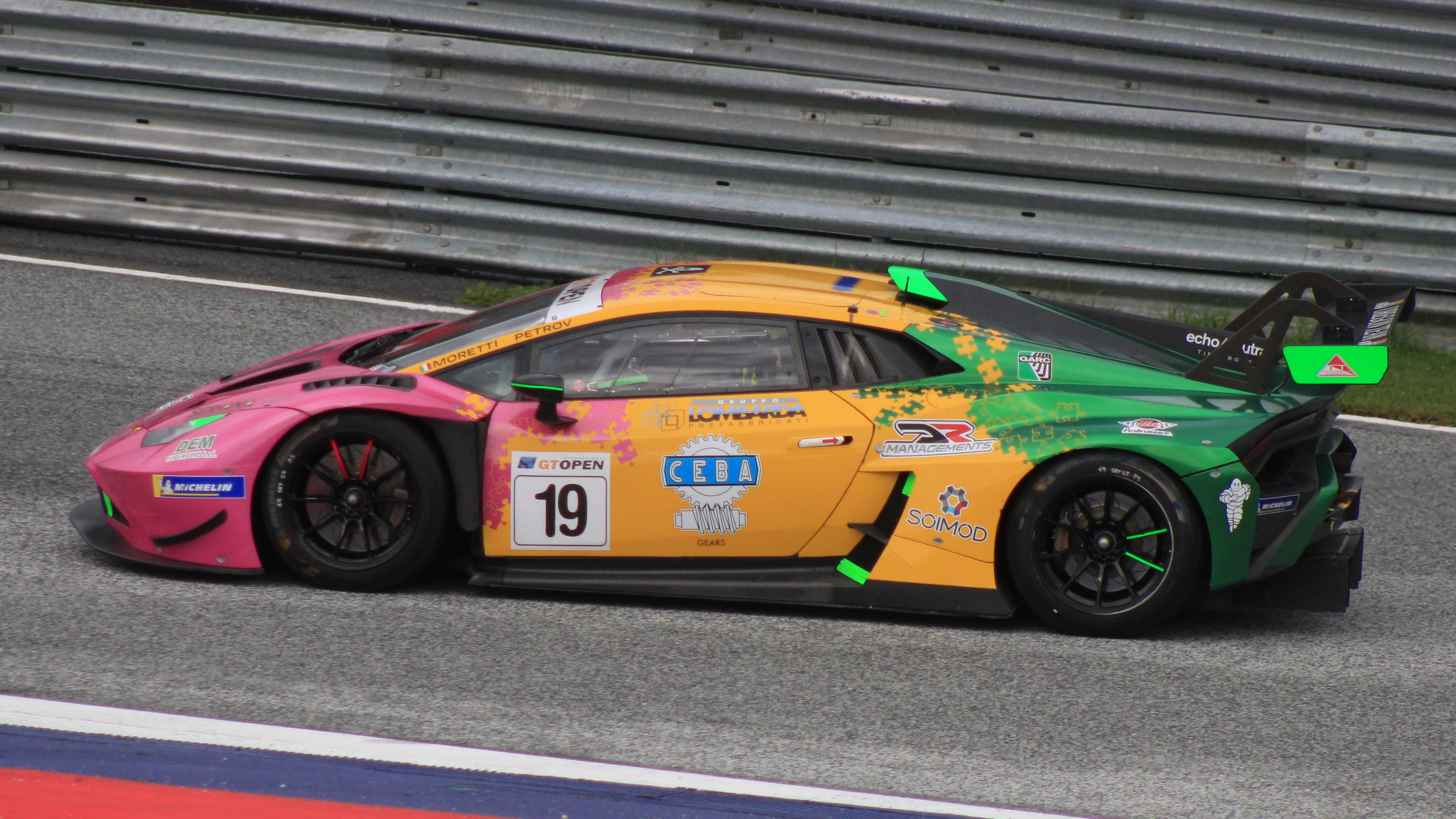
- Moretti in 2024
- Nationality: (Italy) Italian
- Born: 15 January 2002 (age 24) Mantua, Italy
- Categorisation: FIA Silver

Championship titles
- 2019: Ultimate Cup Series Prototype Challenge – P4

Marzio Moretti (born 15 January 2002) is an Italian racing driver who last competed in Lamborghini Super Trofeo Europe for Auto Sport Racing Service.

== Early career ==
=== Junior formulae and prototype debut ===
Moretti started karting in 2012, and during his five-year tenure in karts he most notably won the 2016 Italian Karting Championship in OK-Junior, and also took part in a scouting camp conducted by the Ferrari Driver Academy the following year.

Following a one-off appearance in the 2017–18 Formula 4 UAE Championship for Silberpfeil Energy Dubai where he scored a best result of eighth, Moretti joined BVM Racing to compete in the 2018 Italian F4 Championship. He scored a best result of eighth in the season finale at Mugello and finished 22nd in the standings.

In early 2019, Moretti joined Eurointernational to compete in the LMP3 class of the Le Mans Cup alongside JT Littman. In his only race in the series, Moretti wasn't able to drive as two laps before the driver change, Littman retired following contact with another LMP3 car.

=== Porsche Carrera Cup ===
In 2020, Moretti joined Bonaldi Motorsport to compete in Porsche Carrera Cup Italia. He scored his first pole position at Mugello in a wet-dry qualifying session.

Moretti returned to Carrera Cup Italia and Bonaldi Motorsport for the 2021 season. Moretti scored his only win in the series at the fourth race of the season at Mugello. Following a fourth-place finish in the standings at season's end, Moretti participated in the Porsche Junior Shootout at Motorland Aragon at the end of the year.

=== Lamborghini Super Trofeo ===
In 2022, Moretti switched to the Lamborghini Super Trofeo series, Target Racing alongside Milan Teekens. Moretti scored his first win in the championship at Spa and ended the season third in points.

As a Lamborghini junior, Moretti returned to Lamborghini Super Trofeo Europe for 2023, joining Team Oregon for his sophomore season in the series alongside Sebastian Balthasar. He scored wins at Paul Ricard and Valencia, to finish third in the standings.

In 2026, Moretti returned to Lamborghini Super Trofeo Europe, joining Auto Sport Racing Service to race in Pro-Am alongside Paolo Biglieri. On his return to the series, Moretti took overall poles at the Nürburgring and Monza, as well as class wins in the former and at Barcelona en route to runner-up honours in class.

== GT3 career ==
In early 2024, it was announced that Moretti would stay with Team Oregon, moving to International GT Open alongside Artem Petrov. Moretti scored a best result of sixth in the second Red Bull Ring race and ended the season 22nd in the standings on fifteen points.

During pre-season testing at Paul Ricard for GT World Challenge Europe Endurance Cup, it was announced that Moretti would join Maximilian Paul and John Paul Southern at Paul Motorsport for his maiden campaign in the series. In his rookie year in the series, Moretti scored a best class result of fifth at Monza as he ended the year seventh in the Gold Cup standings.

== Karting record ==
=== Karting career summary ===
| Season | Series | Team | Position |
|---|---|---|---|
| 2012 | Italian Karting Championship – 60 Mini | | 56th |
| 2012 | 41° Trofeo delle Industrie – 60 Mini | | 22nd |
| 2013 | WSK Super Master Series – 60 Mini | Babyrace Driver Academy | 35th |
| 2013 | Italian Karting Championship – 60 Mini | Babyrace Driver Academy | 24th |
| 2013 | WSK Final Cup – 60 Mini | Babyrace Driver Academy | 33rd |
| 2013 | Trofeo di Primavera – 60 Mini | | 12th |
| 2013 | Andrea Margutti Trophy – 60 Mini | | 15th |
| 2013 | 42° Trofeo delle Industrie – 60 Mini | | 9th |
| 2013 | Rok Cup International Final – Mini Rok | | 25th |
| 2014 | WSK Super Master Series – 60 Mini | Babyrace Driver Academy | 58th |
| 2014 | Andrea Margutti Trophy – 60 Mini | Babyrace Driver Academy | 12th |
| 2014 | WSK Final Cup – 60 Mini | Babyrace Driver Academy | 11th |
| 2014 | Rok Cup International Final – Mini Rok | Babyrace Driver Academy | 17th |
| 2014 | Italian Karting Championship – 60 Mini | | 12th |
| 2014 | 43° Trofeo delle Industrie – 60 Mini | | 3rd |
| 2015 | WSK Champions Cup – 60 Mini | Babyrace Driver Academy | 5th |
| 2015 | South Garda Winter Cup – Mini Rok | Babyrace Driver Academy | 7th |
| 2015 | WSK Gold Cup – 60 Mini | Babyrace Driver Academy | 29th |
| 2015 | WSK Super Master Series – 60 Mini | Lario Motorsport Srl | 4th |
| 2015 | Andrea Margutti Trophy – 60 Mini | Lario Motorsport Srl | 3rd |
| 2015 | Karting World Championship – KF Junior | Lario Motorsport Srl | NC |
| 2015 | WSK Final Cup – KF Junior | Lario Motorsport Srl | 18th |
| 2015 | Italian Karting Championship – KF Junior | | 12th |
| 2015 | 44° Trofeo delle Industrie – KF Junior | | 14th |
| 2016 | WSK Champions Cup – OKJ | Lario Motorsport | NC |
| 2016 | South Garda Winter Cup – OKJ | Forza Racing | 13th |
| 2016 | WSK Super Master Series – OKJ | Forza Racing | 39th |
| 2016 | Karting European Championship – OKJ | Forza Racing; Babyrace Driver Academy (Note: Moretti competed for Forza Racing in Rounds 1-2, and Babyrace Driver Academy in rounds 3-4.) | 31st |
| 2016 | WSK Final Cup – OKJ | Babyrace Driver Academy | 25th |
| 2016 | Karting World Championship – OKJ | Babyrace Driver Academy | NC |
| 2016 | Italian Karting Championship – Junior | | 1st |
| 2016 | 45° Trofeo delle Industrie – Junior | | 21st |
| 2017 | WSK Champions Cup – OK | Babyrace Driver Academy | NC |
| 2017 | WSK Super Master Series – OK | Babyrace Driver Academy | 28th |
| 2017 | South Garda Winter Cup – OK | Babyrace Driver Academy | 13th |
| 2017 | Andrea Margutti Trophy – OK | Babyrace Driver Academy | 4th |
| 2017 | Karting European Championship – OK | Babyrace Driver Academy | 42nd |

== Racing record ==
=== Racing career summary ===
| Season | Series | Team | Races | Wins | Poles | F/Laps | Podiums | Points | Position |
|---|---|---|---|---|---|---|---|---|---|
| 2017–18 | Formula 4 UAE Championship | Silberpfeil Energy Dubai | 3 | 0 | 0 | 0 | 0 | 8 | 17th |
| 2018 | Italian F4 Championship | BVM Racing | 18 | 0 | 0 | 0 | 0 | 8 | 22nd |
| 2019 | Le Mans Cup – LMP3 | Eurointernational | 1 | 0 | 0 | 0 | 0 | 0 | NC |
| 2019 | Italian F4 Championship | BVM Racing | 3 | 0 | 0 | 0 | 0 | 0 | 28th |
| 2019 | Ultimate Cup Series Prototype Challenge – P4 | HP Racing Team | 3 | 3 | 0 | 0 | 3 | 100 | **1st** |
| 2020 | Porsche Carrera Cup Italia | Bonaldi Motorsport | 10 | 0 | 2 | 1 | 0 | 45 | 7th |
| 2021 | Porsche Carrera Cup Italia | Bonaldi Motorsport | 12 | 1 | 0 | 1 | 4 | 173 | 4th |
| 2022 | Lamborghini Super Trofeo Europe – Pro | Target Racing srl | 11 | 1 | 1 | 0 | 7 | 103 | **3rd** |
| 2023 | Lamborghini Super Trofeo Europe – Pro | Oregon Team | 12 | 2 | 1 | 1 | 6 | 74 | **3rd** |
| 2023 | Lamborghini Super Trofeo World Finals – Pro | Oregon Team | 2 | 0 | 0 | 0 | 0 | 9 | 7th |
| 2023 | GT Cup Open Europe – Am | Oregon Team | 2 | 0 | 1 | 2 | 2 | 0 | NC |
| 2023 | Italian GT Endurance Championship – GT Cup Am | Bonaldi Motorsport | 1 | 1 | 0 | 0 | 1 | 0 | NC |
| 2024 | International GT Open | Oregon Team | 14 | 0 | 0 | 0 | 0 | 15 | 22nd |
| 2025 | GT World Challenge Europe Endurance Cup | Paul Motorsport | 5 | 0 | 0 | 0 | 0 | 0 | NC |
| 2025 | GT World Challenge Europe Endurance Cup – Gold | Paul Motorsport | 5 | 0 | 0 | 0 | 0 | 36 | 7th |
| 2026 | Lamborghini Super Trofeo Europe – Pro-Am | Auto Sport Racing Service | 11 | 2 | 2 | 3 | 8 | 110 | **2nd** |
| 2026 | Lamborghini Super Trofeo World Finals – Pro-Am | Auto Sport Racing Service | 2 | 0 | 0 | 0 | 1 | 10 | 6th |

=== Complete Formula 4 UAE Championship results ===
(key) (Races in bold indicate pole position) (Races in italics indicate fastest lap)

| Year | Team | 1 | 2 | 3 | 4 | 5 | 6 | 7 | 8 | 9 | 10 | 11 | 12 | 13 | 14 | 15 | 16 | 17 | 18 | 19 | 20 | 21 | 22 | 23 | 24 | Pos | Points |
|---|---|---|---|---|---|---|---|---|---|---|---|---|---|---|---|---|---|---|---|---|---|---|---|---|---|---|---|
| 2017–18 | Silberpfeil Energy Dubai | YMC1; 1 | YMC1; 2 | YMC1; 3 | YMC1; 4 | YMC1; 1 | YMC1; 2 | YMC1; 3 | YMC1; 4 | DUB1; 1; 8 | DUB1; 2 Ret | DUB1; 3; 8 | DUB1; 4 C | YMC3; 1 | YMC3; 2 | YMC3; 3 | YMC3; 4 | YMC4; 1 | YMC4; 2 | YMC4; 3 | YMC4; 4 | DUB2; 1 | DUB2; 2 | DUB2; 3 | DUB2; 4 | 17th | 8 |

=== Complete Italian F4 Championship results ===
(key) (Races in bold indicate pole position) (Races in italics indicate fastest lap)

| Year | Team | 1 | 2 | 3 | 4 | 5 | 6 | 7 | 8 | 9 | 10 | 11 | 12 | 13 | 14 | 15 | 16 | 17 | 18 | 19 | 20 | 21 | 22 | Pos | Points |
|---|---|---|---|---|---|---|---|---|---|---|---|---|---|---|---|---|---|---|---|---|---|---|---|---|---|
| 2018 | BVM Racing | ADR; 1; 14 | ADR; 2; 15 | ADR; 3; 14 | LEC; 1; 12 | LEC; 2; 18 | LEC; 3; 20 | MNZ; 1; 20 | MNZ; 2; 9 | MNZ; 3; 12 | MIS; 1; 16 | MIS; 2; 16 | MIS; 3; 13 | IMO; 1; 23 | IMO; 2; 17 | IMO; 3; 11 | VLL; 1 | VLL; 2 | VLL; 3 | MUG; 1; 9 | MUG; 2; 11 | MUG; 3; 8 | | 22nd | 8 |
| 2019 | BVM Racing | VLL; 1 | VLL; 2 | VLL; 3 | MIS; 1 | MIS; 2 | MIS; 3 | HUN; 1 | HUN; 2 | HUN; 3 | RBR; 1 | RBR; 2 | RBR; 3 | IMO; 1 | IMO; 2 | IMO; 3 | IMO; 4 | MUG; 1; 15 | MUG; 2; 12 | MUG; 3; 14 | MNZ; 1 | MNZ; 2 | MNZ; 3 | 28th | 0 |

=== Complete Le Mans Cup results ===
(key) (Races in bold indicate pole position; results in italics indicate fastest lap)

| Year | Entrant | Class | Chassis | 1 | 2 | 3 | 4 | 5 | 6 | 7 | Rank | Points |
|---|---|---|---|---|---|---|---|---|---|---|---|---|
| 2019 | Eurointernational | LMP3 | Ligier JS P3 | LEC; Ret | MNZ; WD | LMS; 1 | LMS; 2 | CAT | SPA | ALG | NC | 0 |

=== Complete Porsche Carrera Cup Italy Results ===
(key) (Races in bold indicate pole position) (Races in italics indicate fastest lap)

| Year | Entrant | 1 | 2 | 3 | 4 | 5 | 6 | 7 | 8 | 9 | 10 | 11 | 12 | Pos | Points |
|---|---|---|---|---|---|---|---|---|---|---|---|---|---|---|---|
| 2020 | Bonaldi Motorsport | MUG1; 1 | MUG1; 2 | MIS; 1; 6 | MIS; 2; 5 | IMO1; 1; 5 | IMO1; 2; 4 | VLL; 1; 10 | VLL; 2; 7 | **MUG2**; **1**; 9 | **MUG2**; **2**; 5 | MNZ; 1; 9 | MNZ; 2 Ret | 7th | 45 |
| 2021 | Bonaldi Motorsport | MIS1; 1; 4 | MIS1; 2; 29 | MUG; 1; 6 | **MUG**; **2**; 1 | IMO; 1; 4 | IMO; 2; 2 | VLL; 1; 7 | VLL; 2; 7 | FRA; 1; 2 | FRA; 2 Ret | MNZ; 1; 6 | **MNZ**; **2**; 2 | 4th | 173 |

=== Complete International GT Open results ===
(key) (Races in bold indicate pole position; races in italics indicate points for the fastest lap of top ten finishers)

| Year | Team | Car | 1 | 2 | 3 | 4 | 5 | 6 | 7 | 8 | 9 | 10 | 11 | 12 | 13 | 14 | DC | Points |
|---|---|---|---|---|---|---|---|---|---|---|---|---|---|---|---|---|---|---|
| 2024 | Oregon Team | Lamborghini Huracán GT3 Evo 2 | ALG; 1 Ret | ALG; 2; 8 | HOC; 1; 12 | HOC; 2; 13 | SPA; 9 | HUN; 1 Ret | HUN; 2; 17 | LEC; 1; 11 | LEC; 2; 15 | RBR; 1; 8 | RBR; 2; 6 | CAT; 1; 12 | CAT; 2; 27 | MNZ; 11 | 22nd | 15 |

=== Complete GT World Challenge Europe results ===
==== GT World Challenge Europe Endurance Cup ====
(Races in bold indicate pole position) (Races in italics indicate fastest lap)

| Year | Team | Car | Class | 1 | 2 | 3 | 4 | 5 | 6 | 7 | Pos. | Points |
|---|---|---|---|---|---|---|---|---|---|---|---|---|
| 2025 | Paul Motorsport | Lamborghini Huracán GT3 Evo 2 | Gold | LEC; 49 | MNZ; 31 | SPA; 6H; 45 | SPA; 12H; 32 | SPA; 24H; 42 | NÜR; 43 | BAR; 37 | 7th | 36 |
