= 2020 TCR Italy Touring Car Championship =

Motor race competition

The 2020 TCR Italy Touring Car Championship was the sixth season of the ITCC to run under TCR regulations and the 34th season since the national touring car series was revived in 1987 as the Campionato Italiano Turismo. Salvatore Tavano won the drivers' championship, his third consecutive and fourth overall.

== Teams and drivers ==
Team	Car	No.	Drivers	Rounds	Ref.
South Italy Racing Team	Opel Astra TCR	2	(Italy) Andrea Argenti	1–2, 4, 6	
(Italy) Scuderia del Girasole Cupra Racing	CUPRA Leon Competición TCR	3	(Italy) Simone Pellegrinelli	All	
(Italy) Scuderia del Girasole Cupra Racing	CUPRA Leon Competición TCR	4	(Italy) Salvatore Tavano	All	
(Italy) Scuderia del Girasole Cupra Racing	CUPRA Leon Competición TCR	28	(Italy) Federico Paolino	5–6	
(Italy) Scuderia del Girasole Cupra Racing	CUPRA Leon Competición TCR	96	(Spain) Mikel Azcona	6	
(Italy) Scuderia del Girasole Cupra Racing	CUPRA León TCR DSG	6	(Italy) Raffaele Gurrieri	1–4	
(Italy) Scuderia del Girasole Cupra Racing	CUPRA León TCR DSG	19	(Italy) Eric Scalvini	2–4	
(Italy) Scuderia del Girasole Cupra Racing	CUPRA León TCR DSG	21	(Italy) Nicola Guida	All	
(Italy) Élite Motorsport	CUPRA Leon Competición TCR	8	(Italy) Nicola Baldan	6	
(Italy) Élite Motorsport	Volkswagen Golf GTI TCR	24	(Italy) Gennaro Manolio	2	
(Italy) Élite Motorsport	Volkswagen Golf GTI TCR	26	(Italy) Francesco Savoia	1	
(Italy) Élite Motorsport	CUPRA León TCR DSG	44	(Italy) Michele Imberti	All	
(Italy) Poloni Msport	Audi RS 3 LMS TCR	9	(Italy) Matteo Poloni	All	
(Italy) PMA Motorsport	Hyundai i30 N TCR	11	(Italy) Felice Jelmini	All	
(Italy) PMA Motorsport	CUPRA León TCR	94	(Italy) Riccardo Ruberti	1–2	
(North Macedonia) LPR Stefanovski Racing Team	Hyundai i30 N TCR	14	(North Macedonia) Igor Stefanovski	3–6	
(Italy) BF Motorsport	Audi RS 3 LMS TCR	16	(Italy) Ronnie Valori	5	
(Italy) BF Motorsport	Audi RS 3 LMS TCR	68	(Italy) Eric Brigliadori	All	
(Italy) BF Motorsport	Audi RS 3 LMS TCR	69	(Italy) Francesca Raffaele	1–4	
(Italy) Xeo Group	Opel Astra TCR	18	(Italy) Nello Nataloni	2	
(Italy) Xeo Group	Audi RS 3 LMS TCR	26	(Italy) Francesco Savoia	2–4	
(Italy) Antonello Racing	CUPRA León TCR	23	(Italy) Fabio Antonello	1–3	
(Italy) MM Motorsport	Honda Civic Type R TCR (FK8)	24	(Italy) Jonathan Giacon	5–6	
(Italy) MM Motorsport	Honda Civic Type R TCR (FK8)	25	(Italy) Alessandro Giardelli	3–5	
(Italy) MM Motorsport	Honda Civic Type R TCR (FK8)	63	(Argentina) Franco Girolami	1–2	
(Italy) MM Motorsport	Honda Civic Type R TCR (FK8)	64	(Italy) Massimiliano Mugelli	1–4	
(Italy) MM Motorsport	Honda Civic Type R TCR (FK8)	65	(Italy) Jacopo Guidetti	3–6	
(Italy) MM Motorsport	Honda Civic Type R TCR (FK8)	95	(Russia) Ibragim Akhmadov	6	
(Italy) MM Motorsport	Honda Civic Type R TCR (FK2)	72	(Italy) Alessio Caiola	4	
(Italy) B.D. Racing	CUPRA León TCR DSG	25	(Italy) Alessandro Giardelli	1-2	
(Italy) B.D. Racing	Honda Civic Type R TCR (FK2)	28	(Italy) Federico Paolino	1–4	
(Italy) B.D. Racing	Honda Civic Type R TCR (FK2)	76	(Italy) Massimiliano Danetti	5	
(Italy) Massimiliano Pezzuto	Volkswagen Golf GTI TCR	29	(Italy) Massimiliano Pezzuto	4	
(Italy) Proteam Motorsport	Volkswagen Golf GTI TCR	43	(Italy) Riccardo Romagnoli	All	
(Italy) CRM Motorsport	Hyundai i30 N TCR	47	(Italy) Ettore Carminati	1–5	
(Italy) Target Competition	Hyundai i30 N TCR	67	(Italy) Marco Pellegrini	All	
(Italy) Target Competition	Hyundai i30 N TCR	69	(Italy) Francesca Raffaele	5–6	
(Italy) CRC - Cappellari Reparto Corse	Volkswagen Golf GTI TCR DSG	76	(Italy) Daniele Cappellari	2, 4	
(Italy) Trico WRT	Hyundai i30 N TCR	81	(Italy) Damiano Reduzzi	1, 3, 5–6	
(Spain) Volcano Motorsport	CUPRA León TCR	85	(Russia) Evgeni Leonov	6	
(Italy) RC Motorsport	Volkswagen Golf GTI TCR DSG	92	(Italy) Carlotta Fedeli	1–4	
(Italy) Aggressive Italia	Hyundai i30 N TCR	93	(Italy) Mauro Guastamacchia	1–5	

== Calendar and results ==
The calendar was announced in December but due to the COVID-19 pandemic has been postponed to a date yet to be decided.

Rnd.		Circuit	Date	Pole position	Fastest lap	Winning driver	Winning team	DSG Winner	Supporting
1	1	Mugello Circuit, Scarperia	18-19 July	(Italy) Eric Brigliadori	(Italy) Felice Jelmini	(Italy) Salvatore Tavano	(Italy) Scuderia del Girasole Cupra Racing	(Italy) Michele Imberti	Ferrari Challenge Europe; Italian GT Championship
1	2	Mugello Circuit, Scarperia	18-19 July		(Italy) Felice Jelmini	(Italy) Damiano Reduzzi	(Italy) Trico WRT	(Italy) Alessandro Giardelli	Ferrari Challenge Europe; Italian GT Championship
2	3	Misano World Circuit Marco Simoncelli, Misano Adriatico	1-2 August	(Italy) Felice Jelmini	(Italy) Felice Jelmini	(Italy) Felice Jelmini	(Italy) PMA Motorsport	(Italy) Eric Scalvini	Italian F4 Championship
2	4	Misano World Circuit Marco Simoncelli, Misano Adriatico	1-2 August		(Italy) Felice Jelmini	(Italy) Eric Brigliadori	(Italy) BF Motorsport	(Italy) Michele Imberti	Italian F4 Championship
3	5	Autodromo Enzo e Dino Ferrari, Imola	29-30 August	(Italy) Felice Jelmini	(Italy) Felice Jelmini	(Italy) Felice Jelmini	(Italy) PMA Motorsport	(Italy) Eric Scalvini	Italian F4 Championship
3	6	Autodromo Enzo e Dino Ferrari, Imola	29-30 August		(Italy) Damiano Reduzzi	(Italy) Damiano Reduzzi	(Italy) Trico WRT	(Italy) Michele Imberti	Italian F4 Championship
4	7	ACI Vallelunga Circuit, Campagnano di Roma	19-20 September	(Italy) Eric Brigliadori	(Italy) Eric Brigliadori	(Italy) Eric Brigliadori	(Italy) BF Motorsport	(Italy) Michele Imberti	Italian GT Championship; Porsche Carrera Cup Italia
4	8	ACI Vallelunga Circuit, Campagnano di Roma	19-20 September		(Italy) Eric Brigliadori	(North Macedonia) Igor Stefanovski	(North Macedonia) LPR Stefanovski Racing Team	(Italy) Michele Imberti	Italian GT Championship; Porsche Carrera Cup Italia
5	9	Autodromo Nazionale Monza, Monza	7-8 November	(Italy) Eric Brigliadori	(Italy) Eric Brigliadori	(Italy) Jonathan Giacon	(Italy) MM Motorsport	(Italy) Riccardo Romagnoli	
5	10	Autodromo Nazionale Monza, Monza	7-8 November		(Italy) Eric Brigliadori	(Italy) Jonathan Giacon	(Italy) MM Motorsport	(Italy) Matteo Poloni	
6	11	Autodromo Enzo e Dino Ferrari, Imola	21-22 November	(Italy) Jacopo Guidetti	(Spain) Mikel Azcona	(Spain) Mikel Azcona	(Italy) Scuderia del Girasole Cupra Racing	(Italy) Matteo Poloni	
6	12	Autodromo Enzo e Dino Ferrari, Imola	21-22 November		(Spain) Mikel Azcona	(Spain) Mikel Azcona	(Italy) Scuderia del Girasole Cupra Racing	(Italy) Matteo Poloni	

=== Drivers' Championship ===
Scoring systems

Position	1st	2nd	3rd	4th	5th	6th	7th	8th	9th	10th	11th	12th	13th	14th	PP	FL
Points	25	20	18	15	12	10	8	7	6	5	4	3	2	1	**1**	1

Pos.	Driver	MUG (Italy)		MIS (Italy)		IMO1 (Italy)		VAL (Italy)		MNZ (Italy)		IMO2 (Italy)		Pts.
1	(Italy) Salvatore Tavano	1	20	3	4	5	2	3	Ret	3	3	7	5	164
2	(Italy) Eric Brigliadori	**18**	7	2	1	2	13	**1**	10	**6**	2	Ret	2	160
3	(Italy) Felice Jelmini	3	16	**1**	3	**1**	7	4	Ret	2	Ret	3	Ret	154
4	(Italy) Marco Pellegrini	2	3	4	2	20	8	6	4	7	Ret	11	18†	117
5	(Italy) Jacopo Guidetti					4	4	5	3	**DSQ**	DNS	**4**	3	94
6	(Italy) Damiano Reduzzi	Ret	1			2	1			9	Ret	Ret	8	84
7	(Italy) Michele Imberti	4	Ret	7	7	7	5	9	6	Ret	9	13	14	76
8	(Italy) Alessandro Giardelli	9	5	21	22	11	Ret	2	2	8	12			72
10	(Italy) Mauro Guastamacchia	8	6	12	10	8	9	11	8	5	6			71
11	(Italy) Jonathan Giacon									1	1	2	Ret	70
9	(Italy) Ettore Carminati	7	4	5	5	18	6	Ret	5	Ret	DNS			69
12	(North Macedonia) Igor Stefanovski					Ret	3	7	1	14	Ret	6	10	67
13	(Italy) Francesca Raffaele	5	Ret	11	11	22	16	13	Ret	12	4	9	7	54
14	(Spain) Mikel Azcona											1	1	52
15	(Italy) Matteo Poloni	6	9	Ret	14	12	11	16	13	15	7	12	13	39
16	(Italy) Eric Scalvini			6	9	6	10	24	DNS					31
17	(Argentina) Franco Girolami	19	2	22	6									30
18	(Italy) Simone Pellegrinelli	21	Ret	8	Ret	9	14	23	9	Ret	Ret	10	11	29
19	(Italy) Ronnie Valori									4	5			27
20	(Italy) Francesco Savoia	Ret	12	9	8	10	Ret	20	DNS					21
21	(Italy) Andrea Argenti	12	8	Ret	13			10	Ret			Ret	12	20
22	(Russia) Ibragim Akhmadov											5	9	18
24	(Russia) Eugeny Leonov											8	6	17
23	(Italy) Riccardo Romagnoli	13	13	14	18	13	18	19	12	13	11	14	16	17
26	(Italy) Nicola Baldan											15	4	15
25	(Italy) Federico Paolino	16	17	13	15	15	20	22	14	10	8	Ret	15	15
27	(Italy) Massimiliano Mugelli	20	11	23	Ret	14	12	8	Ret					15
28	(Italy) Alessio Caiola							12	7					11
31	(Italy) Nicola Guida	15	18	19	23	21	17	15	16	11	10	16	17	9
29	(Italy) Carlotta Fedeli	11	10	15	16	17	21	18	Ret					9
30	(Italy) Daniele Cappellari			10	12			21	17†					8
32	(Italy) Raffaele Gurrieri	10	15	17	19	16	19	17	15					5
33	(Italy) Massimiliano Pezzuto							14	11					5
34	(Italy) Fabio Antonello	14	14	16	17	19	15							2
35	(Italy) Riccardo Ruberti	17	19	Ret	20									0
36	(Italy) Nello Nataloni			18	24									0
37	(Italy) Gennaro Manolio			20	21									0
-	(Italy) Massimiliano Danetti									DNS	DNS			-
Pos.	Driver	MUG (Italy)		MIS (Italy)		IMO1 (Italy)		VAL (Italy)		MNZ (Italy)		IMO2 (Italy)		Pts.

Colour	Result
Gold	Winner
Silver	Second place
Bronze	Third place
Green	Points classification
Blue	Non-points classification
Blue	Non-classified finish (NC)
Purple	Retired, not classified (Ret)
Red	Did not qualify (DNQ)
Red	Did not pre-qualify (DNPQ)
Black	Disqualified (DSQ)
White	Did not start (DNS)
White	Withdrew (WD)
White	Race cancelled (C)
Blank	Did not practice (DNP)
Blank	Did not arrive (DNA)
Blank	Excluded (EX)

**Bold** – Pole
Italics – Fastest Lap
