= Giammarco Levorato =

Italian racing driver (born 2003)

- Nationality: (Italy) Italian
- Born: 24 July 2003 (age 23) Padova, Italy

FIA World Endurance Championship - LMGT3 career
- Debut season: 2024
- Current team: Proton Competition
- Categorisation: FIA Silver
- Starts: 17 (17 starts)
- Wins: 0
- Podiums: 1
- Poles: 1
- Fastest laps: 0
- Best finish: 16th in 2025

Giammarco Levorato (born 24 July 2003) is an Italian racing driver who is currently competing in the 2026 FIA World Endurance Championship for Proton Competition.

== Early career ==
=== Porsche competition ===
After a short spell in karting, Levorato made his racing debut in the 2021 Porsche Carrera Cup Italia for Tsunami R.T., getting a pole position in his debut round at the Misano World Circuit and another pole two rounds later at Imola Circuit. He got his highest result of the season in the next round at Vallelunga Circuit, a sixth place in the second race and finished the championship in 14th with 65 points.

Levorato continued with Tsunami R.T. for the 2022 season and got his maiden podium in car racing at the second race of the opening round at Imola Circuit. His first car racing win came in the fourth round of the series, winning the second race at Vallelunga Circuit, he also got a second place in the final race of the season at Mugello Circuit. Levorato finished the championship in seventh with one win, one fastest lap, three podiums and 141 points.

Alongside his Porsche Carrera Cup Italia campaign, Levorato also made a cameo as a guest driver in the fourth round of the 2022 Porsche Carrera Cup France at Circuit Zandvoort, where he came fourth and sixth. He also made his Porsche Supercup debut in the final round of the season at Monza Circuit, where he retired from the race.

Levorato made a one-off cameo in the third round of the 2023 Porsche Carrera Cup Italia at Mugello Circuit for The Driving Experiences, where he came thirteenth in the first race and tenth in the second race. He finished 24th in the championship with nine points.

== Endurance career ==
=== 2023 ===
Levorato stepped up to the 2023 European Le Mans Series in the LMGTE category with Proton Competition, marking his debut in endurance racing. He joined Julien Andlauer and team owner Christian Ried for the year.

After an early retirement in their first round at the 4 Hours of Barcelona, they would bounce back a round later at the 4 Hours of Le Castellet, getting their pole position and later converting it to a win, which was the highlight of their season. They achieved a fourth and an eighth at Aragón and Spa-Francorchamps. The final round of the season – also a double header – was successful, grabbing a win at Algarve and another podium to add to their tally at Portimão, with this they came runner-up to the title, ending with two wins, one pole position, three podiums and 85 points.

==== 2024 ====
For his 2024 campaign, Levorato contested the 2024 IMSA SportsCar Championship in the GTD class for Proton Competition, as his campaign would not be successful, retiring from five out of ten races – including the first two rounds at the 24 Hours of Daytona and 12 Hours of Sebring. His highest position achieved was a fifth place at Long Beach after the mishaps at Daytona and Sebring. He also achieved a pole position at the 2024 Michelin GT Challenge at VIR and finished the championship in fifteenth with 2072 points. With Proton Competition, he was given the opportunity to race in the final round of the 2024 World Endurance Championship in the LMGT3 class at Bahrain, where he would also retire from the race, but was the classified in the championships standings at 36th.

==== 2025 ====
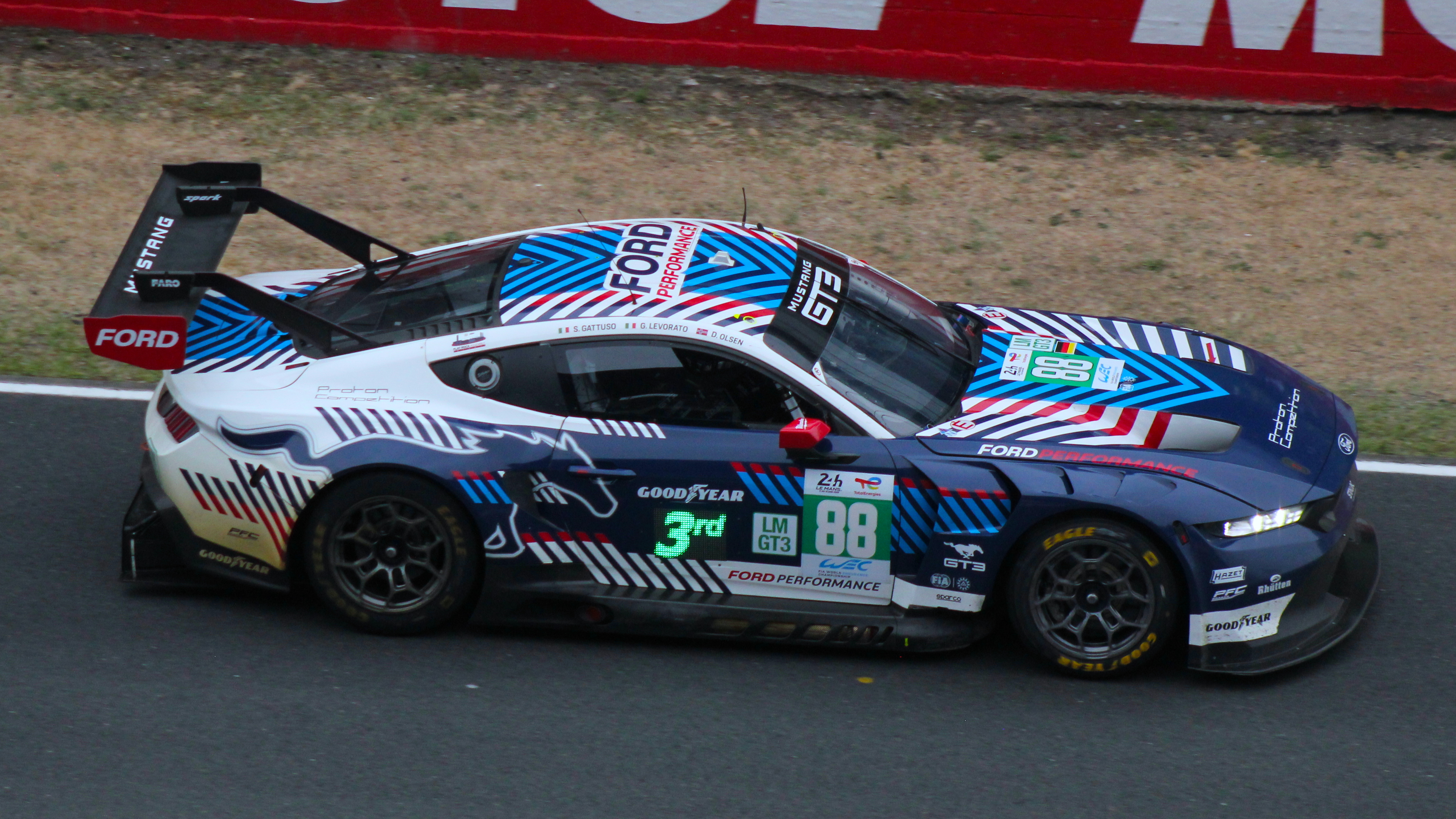
Levorato's No. 88 car at the 2025 24 Hours of Le Mans

Levorato contested the 2025 FIA World Endurance Championship in the LMGT3 class with Proton Competition, partnering Stefano Gattuso and Dennis Olsen. The trio achieved a tenth place on their debut in Qatar and came sixteenth at Levorato's home round at Imola, after a penalty and two additional pit stops to repair damage with the car. They got their maiden podium at Spa-Francorchamps finishing in second place, but retired from the next two rounds at the 24 Hours of Le Mans and São Paulo.

The trio got their first pole position a round later at the Lone Star Le Mans, but came eighth by the races end. They retired from the penultimate round at the 6 Hours of Fuji after collision damage, and came tenth in the final round at the 8 Hours of Bahrain. Levorato finished the championship in sixteenth with twenty-seven points.

==== 2026 ====
He continued with Proton for the 2026 season, partnering Stefano Gattuso and Logan Sargeant. The trio came eighth in the opening round at the 6 Hours of Imola, two rounds later they got their best result of the season with a fifth place at the 6 Hours of São Paulo. They scored their final points finish a round later at the Lone Star Le Mans as they came in ninth.

== Karting record ==
=== Karting career summary ===
Season	Series	Team	Position
2019	48° Trofeo delle Industrie – X30 Senior	Team Driver Racing Kart	18th
2019	IAME International Final – X30 Senior		
2019	IAME Euro Series – X30 Senior	Zagar Corse	
2019	Andrea Margutti Trophy – X30 Senior	CKR	32nd

== Racing record ==
=== Racing career summary ===
Season	Series	Team	Races	Wins	Poles	F/Laps	Podiums	Points	Position
2021	Porsche Carrera Cup Italy	Tsunami R.T.	12	0	2	0	0	65	14th
2021	Italian GT Sprint Championship – GT Cup	Tsunami R.T.	2	1	0	0	2	0	NC
2022	Porsche Carrera Cup Italy	Tsunami R.T.	12	1	0	1	3	141	7th
2022	Porsche Supercup	Tsunami R.T.	1	0	0	0	0	0	NC†
2022	Porsche Carrera Cup France	Tsunami R.T.	2	0	0	0	0	0	NC
2022	Italian GT Sprint Championship – GT Cup	Tsunami R.T.	2					0	NC
2023	Porsche Carrera Cup Italy	The Driving Experiences	2	0	0	0	0	9	24th
2023	European Le Mans Series – LMGTE	Proton Competition	6	2	0	0	3	85	**2nd**
2024	IMSA SportsCar Championship – GTD	Proton Competition	10	0	1	0	0	2072	15th
2024	FIA World Endurance Championship – LMGT3	Proton Competition	1	0	0	0	0	0	36th
2025	FIA World Endurance Championship – LMGT3	Proton Competition	8	0	1	0	1	27	16th
2025	24 Hours of Le Mans – LMGT3	Proton Competition	1	0	0	0	0	N/A	NC
2026	FIA World Endurance Championship – LMGT3	Proton Competition	8	0	0	0	0	16	20th
2026	24 Hours of Le Mans – LMGT3	Proton Competition	1	0	0	0	0	N/A	17th

^{†} As Levorato was a guest driver, he was ineligible to score points.

=== Complete Porsche Carrera Cup Italy ===
(key) (Races in bold indicate pole position) (Races in italics indicate fastest lap)

Year	Entrant	1	2	3	4	5	6	7	8	9	10	11	12	Pos	Points
2021	Tsunami R.T.	MIS; 1; 9	**MIS**; **2**; 15	MUG; 1 Ret	MUG; 2; 15	IMO; 1; 17	**IMO**; **2**; 15	VAL; 1; 9	VAL; 2; 6	FRA; 1; 15	FRA; 2; 15	MNZ; 1; 15	MNZ; 2; 15	14th	65
2022	Tsunami R.T.	IMO; 1; 4	IMO; 2; 3	MIS; 1; 13	MIS; 2; 6	MUG1; 1; 8	MUG1; 2 Ret	VLL; 1; 5	VLL; 2; 1	MNZ; 1; 16	MNZ; 2; 10	MUG2; 1; 7	MUG2; 2; 2	7th	141
2023	The Driving Experiences	MIS1; 1	MIS1; 2	VLL; 1	VLL; 2	MUG; 1; 13	MUG; 2; 10	MNZ; 1	MNZ; 2	MIS2; 1	MIS2; 2	IMO; 1	IMO; 2	24th	9

=== Complete Porsche Supercup results ===
(key) (Races in bold indicate pole position) (Races in italics indicate fastest lap)

Year	Team	1	2	3	4	5	6	7	8	Pos.	Points
2022	Tsunami R.T.	IMO	MON	SIL	RBR	LEC	SPA	ZND	MNZ; Ret	NC†	0

^{†} As Levorato was a guest driver, he was ineligible to score points.

=== Complete European Le Mans Series results ===
(key) (Races in bold indicate pole position; results in italics indicate fastest lap)

Year	Entrant	Class	Chassis	Engine	1	2	3	4	5	6	Rank	Points
2023	Proton Competition	LMGTE	Porsche 911 RSR-19	Porsche 4.2 L Flat-6	CAT; Ret	**LEC**; 1	ARA; 4	SPA; 8	PRT; 1	ALG; 2	2nd	85

=== Complete IMSA SportsCar Championship results ===
(key) (Races in bold indicate pole position)

Year	Team	Class	Make	Engine	1	2	3	4	5	6	7	8	9	10	Rank	Points
2024	Proton Competition	GTD	Ford Mustang GT3	Ford Coyote 5.4 L V8	DAY; 20	SEB; 16	LBH; 5	LGA; 7	WGL; 17	MOS; 12	ELK; 8	**VIR**; 7	IMS; 17	PET; 17	15th	2072

=== Complete FIA World Endurance Championship results ===
(key) (Races in bold indicate pole position; races in italics indicate fastest lap)

Year	Entrant	Class	Chassis	Engine	1	2	3	4	5	6	7	8	Rank	Points
2024	Proton Competition	LMGT3	Ford Mustang GT3	Ford Coyote 5.4 L V8	QAT	IMO	SPA	LMS	SÃO	COA	FUJ	BHR; Ret	36th	0
2025	Proton Competition	LMGT3	Ford Mustang GT3	Ford Coyote 5.4 L V8	QAT; 10	IMO; 16	SPA; 2	LMS; Ret	SÃO; Ret	**COA**; 8	FUJ; Ret	BHR; 10	16th	27
2026	Proton Competition	LMGT3	Ford Mustang GT3 Evo	Ford Coyote 5.4 L V8	IMO; 8	SPA; 12	LMS; 11	SÃO; 5	COA; 9	FUJ; Ret	CAT; DSQ	MNZ; Ret	20th	16

^{*} Season still in progress.

=== Complete 24 Hours of Le Mans results ===
Year	Team	Co-drivers	Car	Class	Laps	Pos.	Class pos.
2025	(Germany) Proton Competition	(Italy) Stefano Gattuso (Norway) Dennis Olsen	Ford Mustang GT3	LMGT3	46	DNF	DNF
2026	(Germany) Proton Competition	(Italy) Stefano Gattuso (United States) Logan Sargeant	Ford Mustang GT3 Evo	LMGT3	323	49th	17th
