= 2016 TCR Series seasons =

2016 TCR Series

Seasons
- ← 2015 2017 →

This article describes all the 2016 seasons of TCR Series around the world.

== Calendar ==
This table indicates the race number of each TCR Series according to weekend dates.

TCR Series	April					May				June				July					August				September				October					November
TCR Series	2–3	9–10	16–17	23–24	30-1	7–8	14–15	21–22	28–29	4–5	11–12	18–19	25–26	2–3	9–10	16–17	23–24	30–31	6–7	13–14	20–21	27–28	3–4	10–11	17–18	24–25	1–2	8–9	15–16	22-23	29–30	5–6	12–13	19–20	26–27
International	1–2			3-4		5-6		7-8		9–10		11–12		13–14								15–16			17–18		19–20							21–22
Spanish	1–2							3–4					5–6													7–8			9–10
Germany			1–2		3–4							5–6					7–8		9-10		11–12						13–14
Italian						1–2					3–4			5–6		7–8							9-10			10–12					13–14
Russian							1–2		3–4			5–6		7–8			9–10					11–12			13–14
Asia							1–2				3–4										5–6						7–8							9–10
Europe							1–2				3–4					5–9			10–11		12–16						17–18
Portuguese							1–4						5–6		7–10																	11–12			13–16
Benelux								1–5								6–10					11–15					16–20				21–25	26–30
Thailand								1–2							3–4							5–6		7–8
