= Castrezzato =

Castrezzato Castrezàt
- Comune
- Comune di Castrezzato
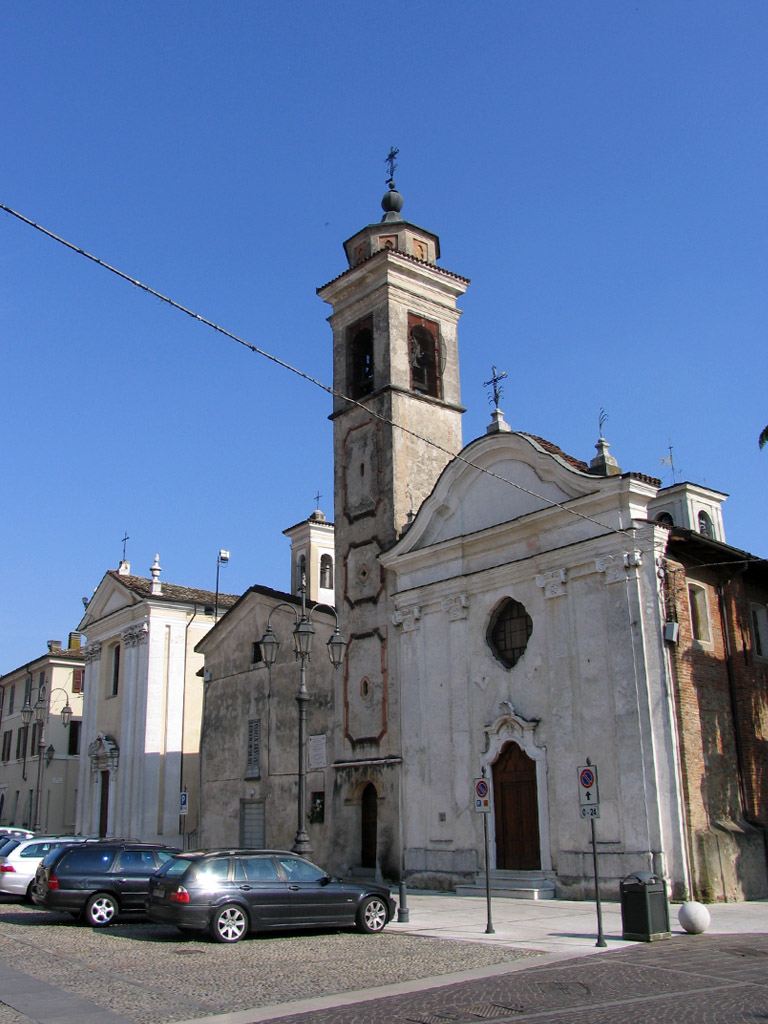

- Location within Italy Location within Lombardy
- Coordinates: 45°31′N 9°59′E
- Country: Italy
- Region: Lombardy
- Province: Province of Brescia (BS)
- Frazioni: Campagna, Bargnana, Monticelle

Government
  - Mayor: Giovanni Aldi

Area
  - Total: 13.63 km^{2} (5.26 sq mi)
- Elevation: 125 m (410 ft)

Population (31 May 2021)
  - Total: 7,434
  - Density: 545.4/km^{2} (1,413/sq mi)
- Demonym: Castrezzatesi
- Time zone: UTC+1 (CET)
  - Summer (DST): UTC+2 (CEST)
- Postal code: 25030
- Dialing code: 030
- Website: Official website

Castrezzato (Brescian: Castrezàt) is a comune in the province of Brescia, in Lombardy, northern Italy. It is located in the plain between the rivers Oglio and Mella, The Autodromo di Franciacorta is nearby.
