= Ford Mustang GT3 =

Ford racing car

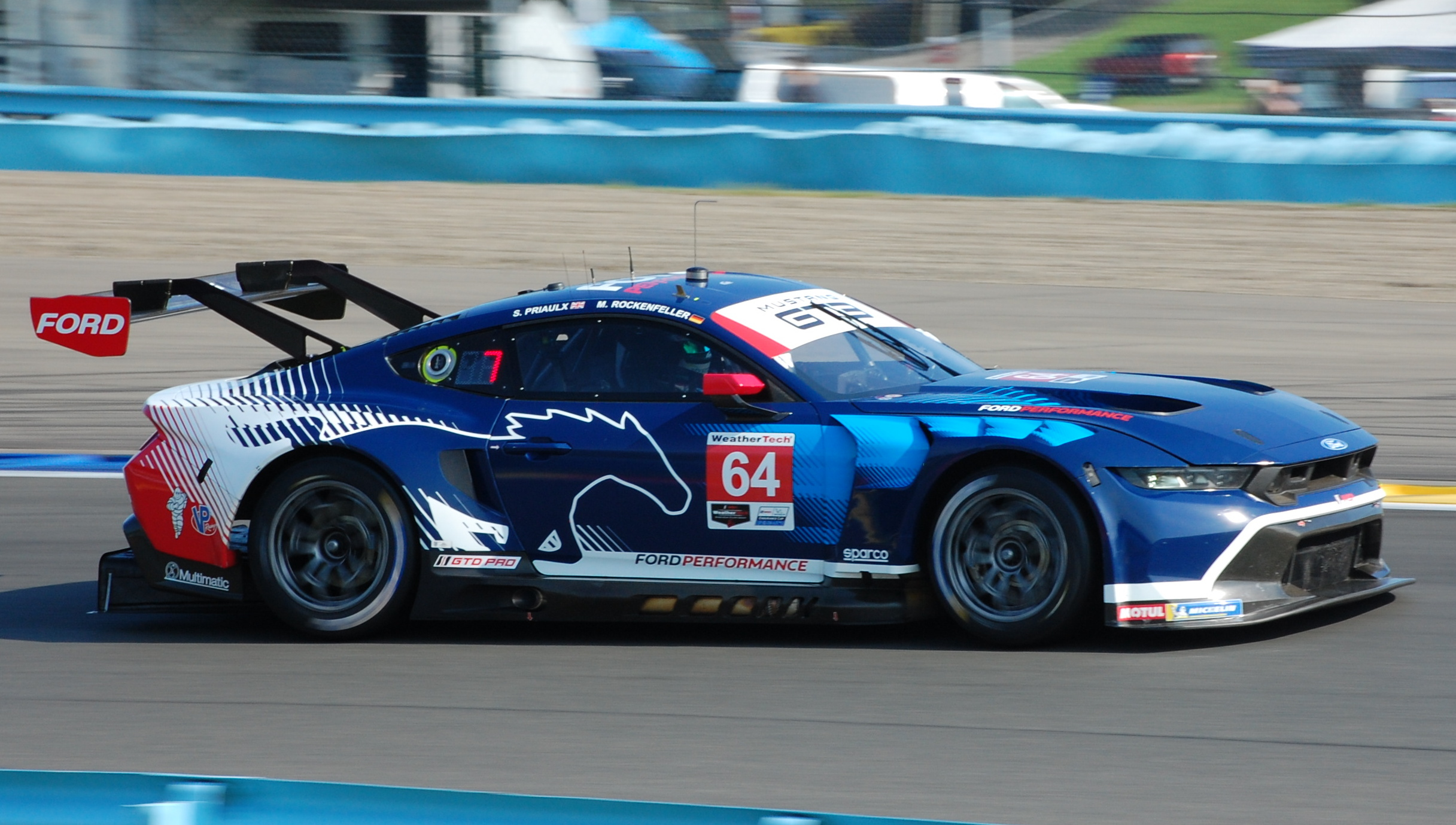
- The No. 64 Mustang GT3 of Multimatic Motorsports during the 2025 Sahlen's Six Hours of The Glen
- Category: Group GT3
- Constructor: (United States) Ford (Multimatic)
- Designers: Anthony Colard (Design Manager, Ford Performance)

Technical specifications
- Engine: Ford Coyote 5.4 L (330 cu in) V8 naturally aspirated, Front-engine
- Transmission: Xtrac racing transaxle with ESA shift 6-speed sequential manual
- Power: 550 hp (410 kW)
- Weight: 2,842 lb (1,289 kg)
- Fuel: TotalEnergies (WEC) & (GTWC); VP Racing Fuels (IMSA)
- Lubricants: Motul; Ravenol
- Tires: Michelin (IMSA); Goodyear (WEC); Pirelli (GTWC)

Competition history
- Notable entrants: (United States) Gradient Racing (Germany) Haupt Racing Team (Canada) Multimatic Motorsports (Germany) Proton Competition
- Notable drivers: (Germany) Mike Rockenfeller (United States) Joey Hand (Germany) Christopher Mies (United Kingdom) Harry Tincknell
- Debut: 2024 24 Hours of Daytona
- First win: 2025 24 Hours of Daytona
- Last win: 2025 IMSA Battle on the Bricks
- Last event: 2026 24 Hours of Daytona

The Ford Mustang GT3 is a grand tourer racing car built by Ford Racing and Multimatic Motorsports for use in Group GT3 competition. Developed in 2022, the car is based on the seventh-generation Ford Mustang Dark Horse and was formally unveiled as part of the 100th anniversary of the 24 Hours of Le Mans on June 9, 2023, making its competitive debut six months later at the 2024 24 Hours of Daytona. It currently competes in a number of major racing series worldwide, including the Deutsche Tourenwagen Masters, FIA World Endurance Championship, GT World Challenge, and IMSA SportsCar Championship.

== Development ==
In 2022, it was announced that Ford Performance and Multimatic Motorsports would be developing a Group GT3-specification Ford Mustang.

The car is powered by a race-tuned 5.4-liter naturally aspirated Ford Coyote V8 developed in partnership with long-time World Rally Championship factory partner M-Sport. It is equipped with a Bosch MS 6.4 engine control unit, a four-plate AP Racing clutch with a MEGA-line e-clutch actuator, and a 6-speed Xtrac sequential manual. For better weight distribution, the transmission was positioned closer to the rear axle.

The chassis features an FIA-homologated fully-integrated compliant racing roll cage as well as other safety devices. It has Multimatic five-way adjustable DSSV dampers, double wishbone suspension on both axles and Alcon brake discs. It also features quickly replaceable parts to make rapid repairs, although this created issues in the car's first year, when in some cases, the boot lid and diffuser would come loose or detach from the car completely, causing lengthy repairs or retirements from races. Ford was later granted permission by the Fédération Internationale de l'Automobile to implement reliability updates to the car to alleviate the issue.

=== Ford Mustang GT3 Evo ===
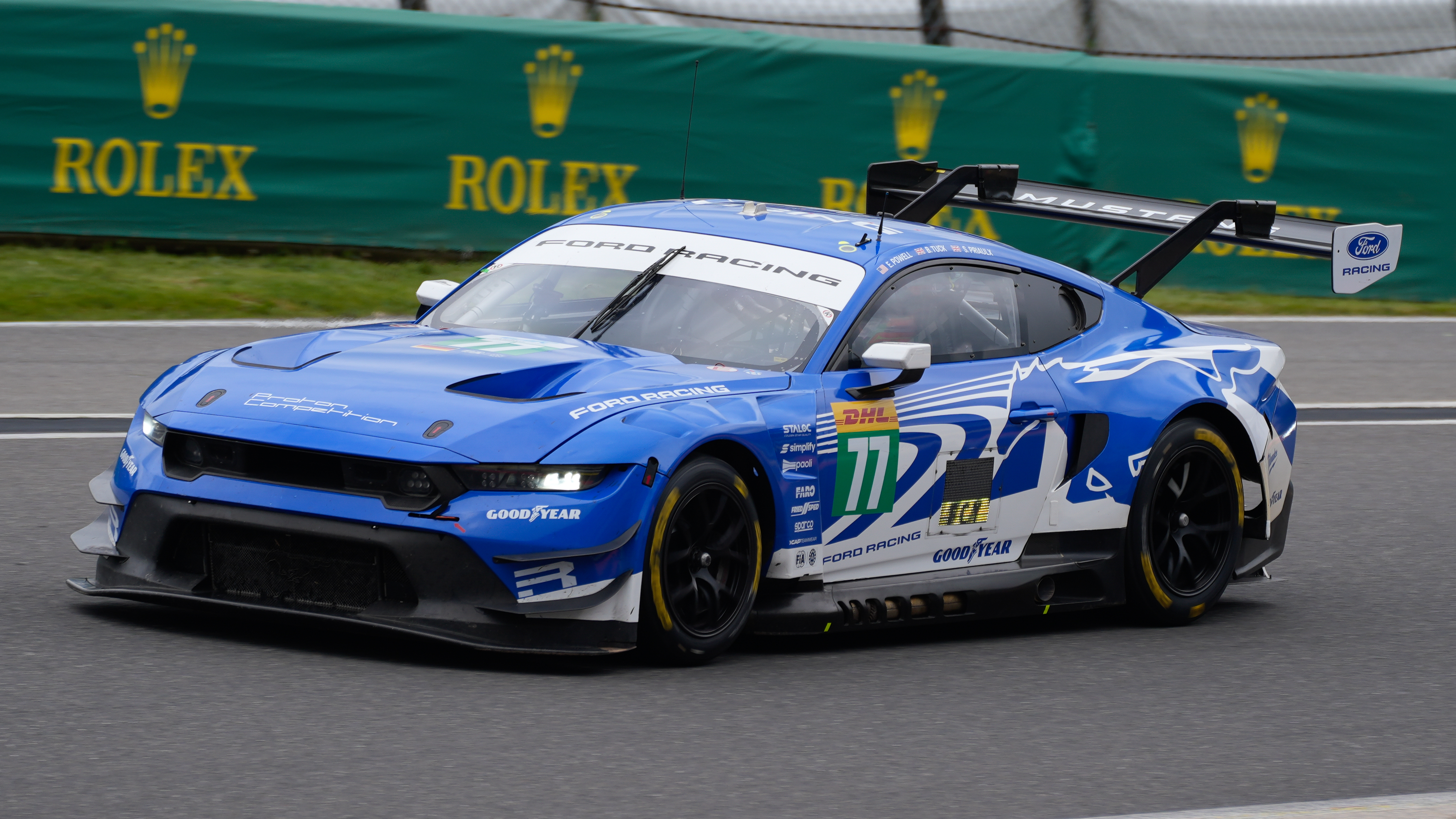
Proton Competition's No. 77 Ford Mustang GT3 Evo at the 2026 6 Hours of Spa-Francorchamps.

On November 13, 2025, Ford began testing an 'Evo' kit on the Mustang GT3 at an IMSA-sanctioned test in Daytona International Speedway. Ford detailed the 'Evo' package in a press article on December 17, 2025 highlighting a series of upgrades addressing weaknesses in aerodynamics, vehicle dynamics, braking efficiency, and sensitivity to setup adjustments. This included new dive planes, a revised front splitter and rear diffuser, an updated brakes package from Brembo, and improved suspension.

The Mustang GT3 Evo made its debut at the 2026 24 Hours of Daytona, with the original Mustang GT3 making its final start one month later at the 2026 Bathurst 12 Hour.

== Teams ==
Upon its debut, Proton Competition and Multimatic Motorsports were announced as the first teams to run the Mustang GT3, with two-car entries in the FIA World Endurance Championship and the IMSA SportsCar Championship, respectively. Four other teams have since fielded Mustangs in other racing series: Dollahite Racing, Gradient Racing, Haupt Racing Team, and Riley Motorsports.

Team	Series
(United States) Dollahite Racing	GT World Challenge America
(United States) Gradient Racing	IMSA SportsCar Championship (GTD)
(Germany) Haupt Racing Team	ADAC GT Masters; Deutsche Tourenwagen Masters GT Winter Series; GT World Challenge Europe Intercontinental GT Challenge; Nürburgring Langstrecken-Serie (SP9)
(Germany) Proton Competition	FIA World Endurance Championship; GT World Challenge Europe; IMSA SportsCar Championship (GTD)
(Canada) Multimatic Motorsports	IMSA SportsCar Championship (GTD Pro)
(United States) Riley Motorsports	IMSA SportsCar Championship (GTD)

== Competition history ==
Early in its first year of competition, the Ford Mustang GT3 experienced issues with its boot lid and diffuser as either part would come loose or detach from the car completely during races. The Fédération Internationale de l'Automobile later granted Ford an "erratum fix" to resolve the issue, which Ford believed to have been caused when cars would follow closely, disrupting airflow. The Mustang later achieved its first pole position and podium in any series at the 2024 Michelin GT Challenge at VIR courtesy of Proton Competition's #55 car in the GTD class and Multimatic Motorsports' #64 car in the GTD Pro class, respectively. Proton Competition also secured a podium at the 2024 24 Hours of Le Mans with their #88 car, Ford's first at Le Mans since 2018.

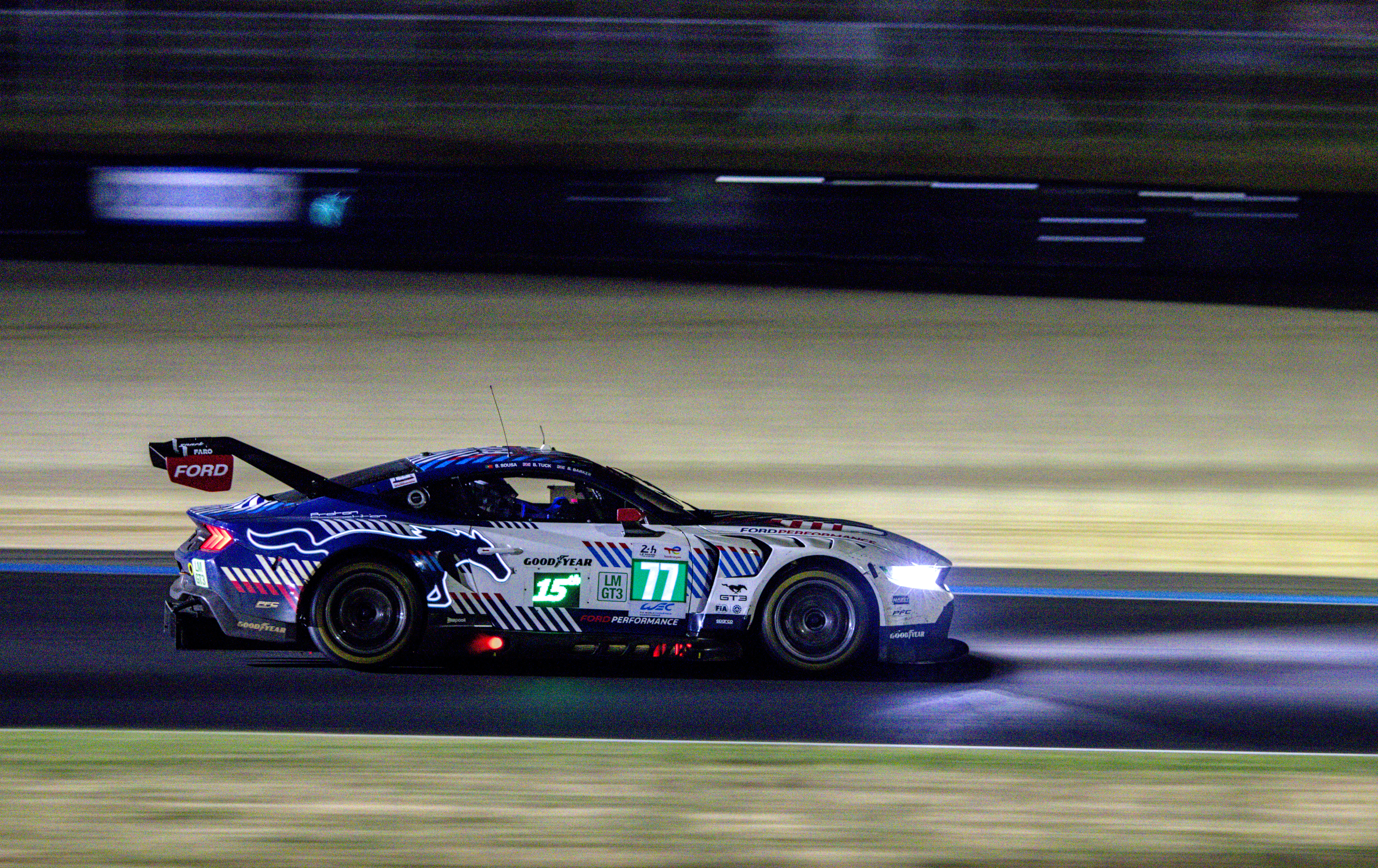
Proton Competition's No. 77 Ford Mustang GT3 during the night stages of the 2025 24 Hours of Le Mans.

Ford's program expanded in 2025 with Dollahite Racing, Gradient Racing, and Haupt Racing Team fielding Mustangs in ADAC GT Masters, Deutsche Tourenwagen Masters, GT World Challenge, and Nürburgring Langstrecken-Serie. The Mustang would earn its first victory at the 2025 24 Hours of Daytona following a close battle with BMW and Chevrolet in the final hours. It also secured a notable class win at the 2025 24 Hours of Nürburgring, with Haupt Racing Team finishing 1st in SP 9 Pro-Am and 4th overall.

An updated 'Evo' version of the Mustang GT3 was introduced for competition in 2026, making its debut in that year's 24 Hours of Daytona. The original Mustang GT3 completed its final race a month later in the 2026 Bathurst 12 Hour, where the sole factory entry was forced to retire three laps into the race after a high-speed collision with a kangaroo. The new 'Evo' package won at the 2026 Monterey SportsCar Championship in Laguna Seca.

== Racing results ==
=== Complete IMSA SportsCar Championship results ===
(key) Races in bold indicates pole position. Races in italics indicates fastest lap.

Complete IMSA SportsCar Championship results
Year	Entrant	Class	Drivers	No.	Rounds											Team		Manufacturer	
Year	Entrant	Class	Drivers	No.	1	2	3	4	5	6	7	8	9	10	11	Pos.	Pts.	Pos.	Pts.
2024					DAY	SEB	LBH	LGA	DET	WGL	MOS	ELK	VIR	IMS	ATL				
2024	(Canada) Ford Multimatic Motorsports	GTD Pro	(Germany) Mike Rockenfeller (United Kingdom) Harry Tincknell (Germany) Christopher Mies 1–2, 11	64	6	7	(Note: No GTD Pro Class.)	9	11	5	4	10	2	2	8	6th	2783	5th	2969
2024	(Canada) Ford Multimatic Motorsports	GTD Pro	(United States) Joey Hand (Germany) Dirk Müller (Belgium) Frédéric Vervisch 1–2, 11	65	9	8	(Note: No GTD Pro Class.)	8	6	10	7	8	4	12	6	10th	2555	5th	2969
2024	(Germany) Proton Competition	GTD	(Italy) Giammarco Levorato (United States) Corey Lewis (United States) Ryan Hardwick 1–2, 6, 11 (Norway) Dennis Olsen 1 (United Kingdom) Ben Barker 10	55	20	16	5	7	(Note: No GTD Class.)	17	12	8	**7**	17	17	15th	2072	10th	2538
2025					DAY	SEB	LBH	LGA	DET	WGL	MOS	ELK	VIR	IMS	ATL				
2025	(Canada) Ford Multimatic Motorsports	GTD Pro	(United Kingdom) Sebastian Priaulx (Germany) Mike Rockenfeller (United States) Austin Cindric 1 (United Kingdom) Ben Barker 2, 11	64	3	5		9	**1**	6	10	2	4	1	4	3rd	3077	3rd	3283
2025	(Canada) Ford Multimatic Motorsports	GTD Pro	(Germany) Christopher Mies (Belgium) Frédéric Vervisch (Norway) Dennis Olsen 1–2, 11	65	1	6		8	10	10	7	5	7	10	5	8th	2714	3rd	3283
2025	(United States) Gradient Racing	GTD	(United Kingdom) Till Bechtolsheimer END (United States) Joey Hand END (Colombia) Tatiana Calderón 1–2, 6 (United Kingdom) Harry Tincknell 1 (United States) Jenson Altzman SPR (United States) Robert Megennis SPR (United States) Mason Filippi 10–11	66	17	13	10	14		6	12	12	5	10	17	13th	2111	9th	2565
2026					DAY	SEB	LBH	LGA	DET	WGL	MOS	ELK	VIR	IMS	ATL				
2026	(United States) Ford Racing	GTD Pro	(United Kingdom) Ben Barker (Norway) Dennis Olsen (Germany) Mike Rockenfeller	64	14	6										12th	459	4th	580
2026	(United States) Ford Racing	GTD Pro	(Germany) Christopher Mies (United Kingdom) Sebastian Priaulx (Belgium) Frédéric Vervisch	65	7	8										7th	517	4th	580
2026	(United States) Myers Riley Motorsports	GTD	(United States) Jenson Altzman (Brazil) Felipe Fraga (United States) Sheena Monk (France) Romain Grosjean 1	16	19	16										17th	346	9th	504
2026	(United States) Gradient Racing	GTD	(United Kingdom) Till Bechtolsheimer (United States) Joey Hand (United States) Jake Walker (United States) Corey Lewis 1	66	18	8										14th	374	9th	504

* Season still in progress.

Complete IMSA North American Endurance Cup results
Year	Entrant	Class	Drivers	No.	Rounds					Team		Manufacturer	
Year	Entrant	Class	Drivers	No.	1	2	3	4	5	Pos.	Pts.	Pos.	Pts.
2024					DAY	SEB	WGL	IMS	ATL				
2024	(Canada) Ford Multimatic Motorsports	GTD Pro	(Germany) Mike Rockenfeller (United Kingdom) Harry Tincknell (Germany) Christopher Mies 1–2, 5	64	6^{2}	7	5^{1}	2^{3}	8	7th	36	4th	37
2024	(Canada) Ford Multimatic Motorsports	GTD Pro	(United States) Joey Hand (Germany) Dirk Müller (Belgium) Frédéric Vervisch 1–2, 5	65	9	8	10	12	6^{3}	11th	29	4th	37
2024	(Germany) Proton Competition	GTD	(Italy) Giammarco Levorato (United States) Corey Lewis (United States) Ryan Hardwick 1–3, 5 (Norway) Dennis Olsen 1 (United Kingdom) Ben Barker 4	55	20	16	17	17^{3}	17	13th	29	8th	29
2025					DAY	SEB	WGL	IMS	ATL				
2025	(Canada) Ford Multimatic Motorsports	GTD Pro	(United Kingdom) Sebastian Priaulx (Germany) Mike Rockenfeller (United States) Austin Cindric 1 (United Kingdom) Ben Barker 2, 11	64	3	5	6	1	4	8th	32	2nd	40
2025	(Canada) Ford Multimatic Motorsports	GTD Pro	(Germany) Christopher Mies (Belgium) Frédéric Vervisch (Norway) Dennis Olsen 1–2, 11	65	1^{3}	6	10^{2}	10	5	4th	35	2nd	40
2025	(United States) Gradient Racing	GTD	(United Kingdom) Till Bechtolsheimer (United States) Joey Hand (Colombia) Tatiana Calderón 1–3 (United Kingdom) Harry Tincknell 1 (United States) Mason Filippi 4–5	66	17	13	6	10	17	18th	28	9th	28
2026					DAY	SEB	WGL	ELK	ATL				
2026	(United States) Ford Racing	GTD Pro	(United Kingdom) Ben Barker (Norway) Dennis Olsen (Germany) Mike Rockenfeller	64	14^{3}	6				7th*	15*	6th*	16*
2026	(United States) Ford Racing	GTD Pro	(Germany) Christopher Mies (United Kingdom) Sebastian Priaulx (Belgium) Frédéric Vervisch	65	7	8				11th*	14*	6th*	16*
2026	(United States) Myers Riley Motorsports	GTD	(United States) Jenson Altzman (Brazil) Felipe Fraga (United States) Sheena Monk (France) Romain Grosjean 1	16	19	16^{3}				10th*	15*	7th*	15*
2026	(United States) Gradient Racing	GTD	(United Kingdom) Till Bechtolsheimer (United States) Joey Hand (United States) Jake Walker (United States) Corey Lewis 1	66	18	8				13th*	14*	7th*	15*

=== Complete FIA World Endurance Championship results ===
(key) Races in bold indicates pole position. Races in italics indicates fastest lap.

Complete FIA World Endurance Championship results
Year	Entrant	Class	Drivers	No.	Rounds								Pos.	Pts.
Year	Entrant	Class	Drivers	No.	1	2	3	4	5	6	7	8	Pos.	Pts.
2024					QAT	IMO	SPA	LMN	SAP	COA	FUJ	BHR		
2024	(Germany) Proton Competition	LMGT3	(United Kingdom) John Hartshorne (Germany) Christopher Mies (United Kingdom) Ben Tuck	44				4					–	
2024	(Germany) Proton Competition	LMGT3	(United Kingdom) Ben Barker (United States) Ryan Hardwick (Canada) Zacharie Robichon	77	11	9	9	17	7	6	15	Ret	17th	18
2024	(Germany) Proton Competition	LMGT3	(Norway) Dennis Olsen (Denmark) Mikkel O. Pedersen 1–7 (Italy) Giorgio Roda 1–4, 8 (Germany) Christian Ried 5, 7 (United States) Ben Keating 6 (Italy) Giammarco Levorato 8	88	9	Ret	8	3	13	NC	16	Ret	13th	37
2025					QAT	IMO	SPA	LMN	SAO	COA	FUJ	BHR		
2025	(Germany) Proton Competition	LMGT3	(United Kingdom) Ben Barker (Portugal) Bernardo Sousa (United Kingdom) Ben Tuck	77	Ret	10	4	7	Ret	6	12	8	11th	25
2025	(Germany) Proton Competition	LMGT3	(Italy) Stefano Gattuso (Italy) Giammarco Levorato (Norway) Dennis Olsen	88	10	16	2	Ret	Ret	8	NC	10	14th	20
2026					IMO	SPA	LMN	SAO	COA	FUJ	QAT	BHR		
2026	(Germany) Proton Competition	LMGT3	(United States) Eric Powell (United Kingdom) Sebastian Priaulx (United Kingdom) Ben Tuck	77										
2026	(Germany) Proton Competition	LMGT3	(Italy) Stefano Gattuso (Italy) Giammarco Levorato (United States) Logan Sargeant	88										

* Season still in progress.

=== Complete Intercontinental GT Challenge results ===
Year	Entrant	Class	Drivers	No.	Rounds					Pos.	Pts.
Year	Entrant	Class	Drivers	No.	1	2	3	4	5	Pos.	Pts.
2026					BAT	NUR	SPA	SUZ	IND		
2026	(United States) Dollahite Racing	Pro	(United States) Cameron Lawrence TBC (United Kingdom) Alex Sedgwick TBC	6						NC	0
2026	(Germany) HRT Ford Racing	Pro	(Australia) Broc Feeney 1 (Germany) Christopher Mies 1 (Norway) Dennis Olsen 1 (France) Thomas Drouet TBC (India) Arjun Maini TBC (Switzerland) Fabio Scherer TBC	64	Ret					NC	0
2026	(Germany) HRT Ford Racing	Silver	(Philippines) Eduardo Coseteng TBC (Netherlands) Maxime Oosten TBC (Germany) Finn Wiebelhaus TBC	65						NC	0

=== Complete GT World Challenge Europe results ===
(key) Races in bold indicates pole position. Races in italics indicates fastest lap.

Complete GT World Challenge Europe results
Year	Entrant	Class	Drivers	No.	Rounds																	Overall		Endurance		Sprint	
Year	Entrant	Class	Drivers	No.	Rounds																	Pos.	Pts	Pos.	Pts	Pos.	Pts
2024					LEC	BRH		MIS		SPA			HOC		NÜR	MAG		MNZ	CAT		JED						
2024					LEC	S1	S2	S1	S2	6H	12H	24H	S1	S2	NÜR	S1	S2	MNZ	S1	S2	JED						
2024	(Germany) Proton Competition	Pro Cup	(Germany) Christopher Mies (Belgium) Frédéric Vervisch (Norway) Dennis Olsen 1, 4, 6, 8 (United Kingdom) Ben Barker 10	64	10					40	13	19			24			20			Ret	24th	1	19th	1	–	
2025					LEC	BRH		ZAN		MNZ	SPA			MIS		MAG		NÜR	VAL		BAR						
2025					LEC	S1	S2	S1	S2	MNZ	6H	12H	24H	S1	S2	S1	S2	NÜR	S1	S2	BAR						
2025	(Germany) HRT Ford Performance	Pro Cup	(France) Thomas Drouet END (India) Arjun Maini END (United Kingdom) Jann Mardenborough END (France) Romain Andriolo 2–3, 6–7 (Germany) Jusuf Owega 2–3, 6–7	64	11	28	25	Ret	21	19	29	11	Ret	22	22	Ret	WD	6			51	18th	10	15th	10	NC	0
2025	(Germany) HRT Ford Performance	Silver Cup	(France) Romain Andriolo END (Germany) David Schumacher END (Germany) Finn Wiebelhaus END (Germany) Salman Owega 5	65	9					5	6	6	7†					4			13	12th	38	9th	38	–	
2026					LEC	BRH		MNZ	SPA			MIS		MAG		NÜR	ZAN		BAR		POR						
2026					LEC	S1	S2	MNZ	6H	12H	24H	S1	S2	S1	S2	NÜR	S1	S2	S1	S2	POR						
2026	(Germany) HRT Ford Racing	Pro Cup	(France) Thomas Drouet (India) Arjun Maini (Switzerland) Fabio Scherer	64																							
2026	(Germany) HRT Ford Racing	Silver Cup	(Philippines) Eduardo Coseteng (Netherlands) Maxime Oosten (Germany) Finn Wiebelhaus	65																							

* Season still in progress.

=== Nürburgring Langstrecken-Serie ===
(key) Races in bold indicates pole position. Races in italics indicates fastest lap.

Complete Nürburgring Langstrecken-Serie results
Year	Entrant	Class	Drivers	No.	Rounds										Speed-Trophae		Class	
Year	Entrant	Class	Drivers	No.	1	2	3	4	5	6	7	8	9	10	Pos.	Pts.	Pos.	Pts.
2025					NLS1	NLS2	NLS3	24H-Q		NLS6	NLS7	NLS8	NLS9	NLS10				
2025	(Germany) HRT Ford Performance 1–3 (Germany) Haupt Racing Team 6–10	SP9 Pro	(Germany) Frank Stippler (Norway) Dennis Olsen 1–2 (India) Arjun Maini 1, 3 (Germany) Nico Bastian 1 (Germany) Hubert Haupt 2–3 (Germany) Jusuf Owega 2–3	2	DNS	7	WD								–		–	
2025	(Germany) HRT Ford Performance 1–3 (Germany) Haupt Racing Team 6–10	SP9 Pro	(Germany) Dennis Fetzer 1–3 (Germany) Dirk Müller 1, 3 (Germany) Jusuf Owega 1 (Germany) David Schumacher 1–2 (Germany) Salman Owega 2 (Germany) Vincent Kolb 3, 6–10 (Germany) Patrick Assenheimer 2–3, 6 (Germany) Frank Stippler 6–10	6	10		9			3	Ret	1	3	3	3rd	145	3rd	133
2025	(Germany) HRT Ford Performance 1–3 (Germany) Haupt Racing Team 6–10	SP9 Pro-Am	(Germany) Dennis Fetzer 1–3 (Germany) Dirk Müller 1, 3 (Germany) Jusuf Owega 1 (Germany) David Schumacher 1–2 (Germany) Salman Owega 2 (Germany) Vincent Kolb 3, 6–10 (Germany) Patrick Assenheimer 2–3, 6 (Germany) Frank Stippler 6–10	6		2									3rd	145	3rd	28
2025	(Germany) HRT Ford Performance 1–3 (Germany) Haupt Racing Team 6–10	SP9 Pro	(Germany) Dennis Fetzer (Switzerland) Fabio Scherer (United Kingdom) Jann Mardenborough 9 (Germany) Patrick Assenheimer 10	9									2		–		–	
2025	(Germany) HRT Ford Performance 1–3 (Germany) Haupt Racing Team 6–10	SP9 Pro-Am	(Germany) Dennis Fetzer (Switzerland) Fabio Scherer (United Kingdom) Jann Mardenborough 9 (Germany) Patrick Assenheimer 10	9										1	–		–	
2026					NLS1	NLS2	NLS3	24H-Q		NLS6	NLS7	NLS8	NLS9	NLS10				
2026	(Germany) HRT Ford Racing	SP9 Pro	(Germany) Vincent Kolb 1 (Germany) Christopher Mies 1 (Norway) Dennis Olsen 1 (Belgium) Frédéric Vervisch 1 (Norway) Emil Gjerdrum 2 (India) Arjun Maini 2 (Switzerland) Fabio Scherer 2	64	C	11									–		–	
2026	(Germany) HRT Ford Racing	SP9 Pro-Am	(Germany) Hubert Haupt 2 (Germany) David Schumacher 2 (Germany) Frank Stippler 2 (Germany) Vincent Kolb 3 (Germany) Christopher Mies 3 (Norway) Dennis Olsen 3 (Belgium) Frédéric Vervisch 3	65		Ret									NC	–	NC	–

* Season still in progress.

** Not eligible for championship points.

=== GT World Challenge America ===
(key) Races in bold indicates pole position. Races in italics indicates fastest lap.

Complete GT World Challenge America results
Year	Entrant	Class	Drivers	No.	Rounds													Team		Manufacturer	
Year	Entrant	Class	Drivers	No.	1		2		3		4		5		6		7	Pos.	Pts.	Pos.	Pts.
2025					SON		COT		SEB		VIR		ELK		BAR		IND				
2025	(United States) Dollahite Racing	Pro-Am Cup	(United States) Scott Dollahite (United States) Anthony Lazzaro 1–2 (Italy) Stefano Gattuso 3, 7 (United States) Eric Powell 4–7	6	13	13												14th	0	8th	66
2025	(United States) Dollahite Racing	Am Cup	(United States) Scott Dollahite (United States) Anthony Lazzaro 1–2 (Italy) Stefano Gattuso 3, 7 (United States) Eric Powell 4–7	6			2†	1**^{P}**	1**^{PF}**	1**^{PF}**	2†**^{P}**	1	2†**^{P}**	WD	1**^{P}**	1**^{P}**	2	2nd	163	8th	66
2026*					SON		COT		SEB		ATL		ELK		BAR		IND				
2026*	(United States) Dollahite Racing	Pro Cup	(United States) Cameron Lawrence (United Kingdom) Alex Sedgwick	6	3													3rd*	15*	4th*	12*

† – Drivers did not finish the race but were classified, as they had started the race.

* Season still in progress.

=== ADAC GT Masters ===
(key) Races in bold indicates pole position. Races in italics indicates fastest lap.

Complete ADAC GT Masters results
Year	Entrant	Class	Drivers	No.	Rounds												Pos.	Pts.
Year	Entrant	Class	Drivers	No.	1		2		3		4		5		6		Pos.	Pts.
2025					LAU		ZAN		NÜR		SAL		RBR		HOC			
2025	(Germany) Haupt Racing Team	Silver	(Germany) Salman Owega (Germany) Finn Wiebelhaus	1	2^{2}	4^{2}	5	Ret	1^{2}	**1**^{1}	7^{2}	3^{2}	**2^{1}**	1	8	1	1st	351
2025	(Germany) Haupt Racing Team	Silver	(Venezuela) Jonathan Cecotto (Germany) Dennis Fetzer	2	Ret	5	7	7	Ret	8	**8^{1}**	7	9^{3}	4	6	7	1st	351
2025	(Germany) Haupt Racing Team	Silver	(Germany) Niklas Kalus (Germany) Max Reis 1–2, 4–6 (Germany) David Schumacher 3	3	3	**Ret**^{1}	6	4	**3**^{1}	2^{2}	11	8	3	5	5	8	1st	351
2026					RBR		ZAN		LAU		NÜR		SAL		HOC			
2026	(Germany) Haupt Racing Team	Silver	(Norway) Emil Gjerdrum (Germany) Max Reis	1														
2026	(Germany) Haupt Racing Team	Silver	(Austria) Kiano Blum (Germany) Niklas Kalus	2														
2026	(Germany) Haupt Racing Team	Silver	(Italy) Max Cuccarese (Switzerland) Alain Valente	74														

* Season still in progress.

=== Deutsche Tourenwagen Masters ===
(key) Races in bold indicates pole position. Races in italics indicates fastest lap.

Complete Deutsche Tourenwagen Masters results
Year	Entrant	Drivers	No.	Rounds																Team		Manufacturer	
Year	Entrant	Drivers	No.	1		2		3		4		5		6		7		8		Pos.	Pts.	Pos.	Pts.
2025				OSC		LAU		ZAN		NOR		NÜR		SAC		RBR		HOC					
2025	(Germany) HRT Ford Performance	(India) Arjun Maini	36	15	16	12	17	Ret	10	8	5^{3}	Ret	6	20	Ret	11	5	14	13	9th	84	6th	119
2025	(Germany) HRT Ford Performance	(Switzerland) Fabio Scherer	64	19	18	Ret	Ret	11	DNS	DNS	Ret	18	19	8	11	14	Ret	17	18	9th	84	6th	119
2026				RBR		ZAN		LAU		NOR		OSC		NÜR		SAC		HOC					
2026	(Germany) HRT Ford Racing	(India) Arjun Maini	36																				
2026	(Germany) HRT Ford Racing	(Germany) Finn Wiebelhaus	64																				

* Season still in progress.
