= 2015 TCR Series seasons =

Touring car championship

2015 TCR Series

Seasons
- ← none 2016 →

This article describes all the 2015 seasons of TCR Series across the world.

== Calendar ==
This table indicates the race number of each TCR Series according to weekend dates.

TCR Series	March	April				May					June				July				August					September				October				November
TCR Series	28–29	4–5	11–12	18–19	25–26	2–3	9–10	16–17	23–24	30–31	6–7	13–14	20–21	27–28	4–5	11–12	18–19	25–26	1–2	8–9	15–16	22–23	29–30	5–6	12–13	19–20	26–27	3–4	10–11	17–18	24–25	31–1	7–8	14–15	21–22
International	1–2		3–4			5–6	7–8		9–10	11–12			13–14			15–16										17–18					19–20				21–22
Russian								1–2		3–4			5–6			7–8			9–10					11–12		13–14
Italian										1–2		3–4		5–6				7–8							9		10–12			13–14
Asia																								1–3		4–5					6–7				8–9
Portuguese																								1–2					3–4

== TCR Russian Touring Car Championship ==
The 2015 TCR Russian Touring Car Championship season was the first season of the TCR Russian Touring Car Championship, which formed part of the Russian Circuit Racing Series, organised by SMP Racing Series. The series ran alongside the Super 2000 TC2 and the Super Production cars. Aleksey Dudukalo won the drivers' championship, driving a SEAT León Cup Racer, winning 9 of the season's 14 races, and reached the podium in them all. Lukoil Racing Team won the teams' championship.

The 2015 calendar consisted of seven rounds, with all events held in Russia. The fifth round was scheduled to be held at Autodrom Moscow, but it was later moved to the Smolensk Ring. The seventh round was scheduled to be held at Sochi Autodrom, but it was later moved to the Kazan Ring.

=== Drivers' championship ===
All races were held in Russia, with all teams and drivers Russian-registered. The Lukoil Racing Team used the SEAT León Cup Racer car, while the Ralf-Car Team used a Renault Clio RS at races 3–6 and a Renault Mégane RS at races 11–14. Yokohama was the official tyre supplier.

Scoring system

Position	1st	2nd	3rd	4th	5th	6th	7th	8th	9th	10th	Pole	FL
Points Round 1–6	25	18	15	12	10	8	6	4	2	1	1	1
Points Round 7	37.5	27	22.5	18	15	12	9	6	3	1.5	1.5	1.5

(key)

Pos.	No.	Driver	Team	NRING 16–17 May		Smolensk 30–31 May		Sochi 20–21 June		Kazan 11–12 July		Smolensk 1–2 August		Moscow 5–6 September		Kazan 19–20 September		Pts.
Pos.	No.	Driver	Team	1	2	3	4	5	6	7	8	9	10	11	12	13	14	Pts.
1	2	Aleksey Dudukalo	Lukoil Racing Team	3	1	1	1	1	2	2	1	1	1	1	1	3	3	337
2	4	Roman Golikov	Lukoil Racing Team	8	2	2	3	4	1	3	4	4	Ret	3	3	1	2	225.5
3	7	Rustam Akiniyazov	Lukoil Racing Team	7	Ret	3	2	3	Ret	1	2	3	DSQ	4	4	2	1	202.5
4	22	Andrey Artyushin (Note: Artyushin competed in races 3–6 at Smolensk and Sochi in a different category of the Russian Touring Car Championship.)	Ralf-Car Team			Ret	14	10	11					7	Ret	13	13	6

=== Teams' Championship ===
Pos.	Team	NRING 16–17 May		Smolensk 30–31 May		Sochi 20–21 June		Kazan 11–12 July		Smolensk 1–2 August		Moscow 5–6 September		Kazan 19–20 September		Pts.
Pos.	Team	1	2	3	4	5	6	7	8	9	10	11	12	13	14	Pts.
1	Lukoil Racing Team	3	1	1	1	1	1	1	1	1	1	1	1	1	1	594
1	Lukoil Racing Team	7	2	2	2	3	2	2	2	3	Ret	3	3	2	2	594
2	Ralf-Car Team			Ret	14	10	11					7	Ret	13	13	6

== TCR Italian Series ==
The 2015 TCR Italian Series season was the first season of the TCR Italian Series. It was part of the Campionato Italiano Turismo Endurance, as the third division of the series. Valentina Albanese won the championship, winning 12 out of a possible 14 races, driving a SEAT León Cup Racer. Jordi Gené was the only driver to defeat her in the final race of the season at Mugello, while there was no winner in a race at Enna, as Albanese – the only starter – failed to finish.

The provisional 2015 schedule was announced on 27 January 2015, with all events scheduled to be held in Italy. On 9 February, the Monza round was postponed to 31 May due to organisational problems. For the same reasons, on 22 April the Magione round was also postponed to 14 June.

=== Drivers' championship ===
All races were held in Italy. All teams and drivers were Italian-registered, except for Spanish driver Jordi Gené. All teams used the SEAT León Cup Racer car, with Yokohama tyres.

Scoring system

Position	1st	2nd	3rd	4th	5th	6th	7th	8th	9th	10th
Points	20	15	12	8	7	5	4	3	2	1

(key)

Pos.	No.	Driver	Team	Monza 30–31 May		Magione 14 June		Imola 27–28 June		Pergusa 26 July		Vallelunga 13 September		Misano 26–27 September			Mugello 17–18 October		Pts.
Pos.	No.	Driver	Team	1	2	3	4	5	6	7	8	9	-	10	11	12	13	14	Pts.
1	101	Valentina Albanese	SEAT Motorsport Italia	1	1	1	1	1	1	Ret	1	1	C	1	1	1	1	2	255
2	103	Jordi Gené	SEAT Motorsport Italia											2	2		2	1	65
3	102	Carlotta Fedeli	SEAT Motorsport Italia			2	2												30
4	123	Simone Sartori	Dinamic Motorsport														3	3	24

== TCR Portuguese Series ==
The 2015 TCR Portuguese Series season was the first season of the TCR Portuguese Series. It was part of the Campeonato Nacional de Velocidade, organised by FullEventos, as one of the six categories of the touring class. Francisco Mora was the only competitor in the class, driving a SEAT León Cup Racer, and therefore won the championship unopposed.

The 2015 schedule was announced on 17 March 2015 and consisted of six rounds. Subsequently, the Jarama round scheduled for 31 May was cancelled, so the official schedule consisted of five rounds, all to be held in Portugal. However, the first three rounds – held at Braga, Portimão and Vila Real – did not see any TCR entries.

=== Drivers' championship ===
All races were held in Portugal. Portuguese driver Francisco Mora used a SEAT León Cup Racer car with Michelin tyres.

Scoring system

Position	1st	2nd	3rd	4th	5th	6th	7th	8th	9th	10th	Pole	FL
Points	25	20	17	14	12	10	8	6	4	2	1	1

(key)

Pos.	No.	Driver	Team	Portimão 6 September		Estoril 11 October		Pts.
Pos.	No.	Driver	Team	1	2	3	4	Pts.
1	66	Francisco Mora	Veloso Motorsport	1	1			108
1	60	Francisco Mora	Veloso Motorsport			1	1	108
