= Stefano Gattuso =

Italian racing driver

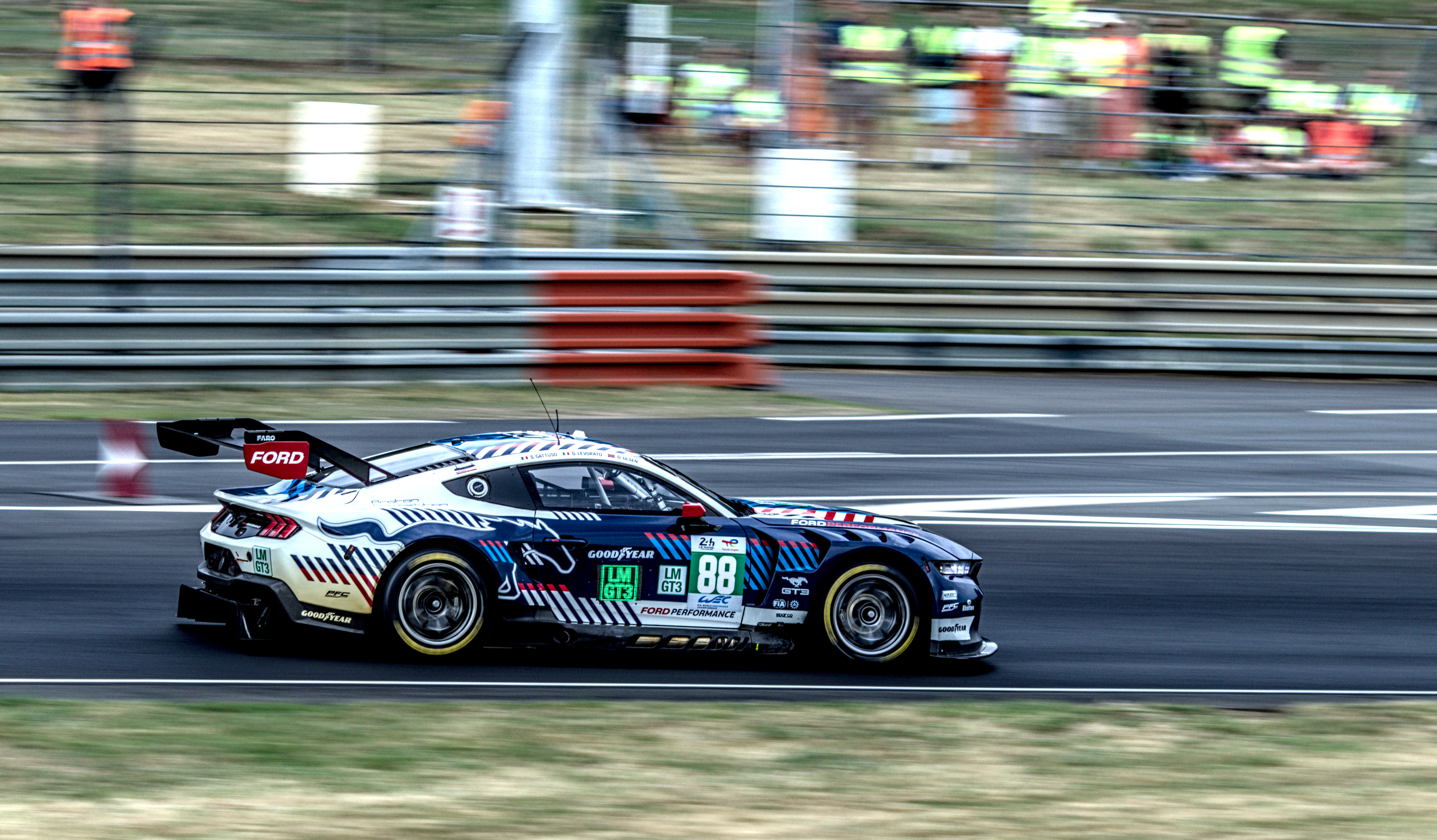
- Gattuso in 2025
- Nationality: (Italy) Italian
- Born: 3 May 1984 (age 42) Sarnico, Italy

FIA GT3 European Championship career
- Current team: Kessel Racing
- Categorisation: FIA Gold (until 2013); FIA Silver (2014–2022); FIA Bronze (2023–)

Championship titles
- 2015: Italian GT3 Championship

Stefano Gattuso (Italian pronunciation: [ˈsteːfano ɡatˈtuːzo]; born 3 May 1984) is an Italian racing driver.

Born in Sarnico near Bergamo, Gattuso started off in single-seaters, culminating in an Italian Formula 3000 Light Class title and a GP2 Series test in 2005. He later embarked on a sports car racing career largely spent in the International GT Open. A long-term Ferrari stalwart, Gattuso notably won for Kessel Racing in the 2009 FIA GT3 European Championship. He was also part of the team's 2012 Blancpain Endurance Series trio that took two overall pole positions, together with Davide Rigon and Daniel Zampieri.

After becoming Italian GT champion in 2015, Gattuso switched to Lamborghini.

In 2022, Gattuso was diagnosed with a rare soft-tissue sarcoma. Upon recovery, he made a racing comeback as an FIA Bronze-rated driver in the FIA World Endurance Championship with Ford Racing.

== Racing record ==
=== Racing career summary ===
Year	Number of races	Wins	Podiums	Pole positions	Fastest race laps
2002	6	0	0	0	0
2003	9	0	1	0	0
2004	14	1	2	1	1
2005	8	6	8	6	7
2006	13	0	2	0	0
2007	11	0	0	0	?
2008	12	0	1	?	?
2009	13	1	5	0	1
2010	14	3	7	2	2
2011	16	7	12	2	3
2012	12	0	3	2	0
2013	12	0	0	0	1

=== Complete FIA GT3 European Championship results ===
Year	Team	Car	1	2	3	4	5	6	7	8	9	10	11	12	Pos.	Points
2009	Kessel Racing	Ferrari 430 GT3 Scuderia	SIL1; DNS	SIL2; Ret	ADR1; Ret	ADR2; 3	OSC1; 11	OSC2; 15	ALG1; 17	ALG2; 3	LEC1; 11	LEC2; 6	ZOL1; 2	ZOL2; 1	5th	33

=== Complete Blancpain GT Series Endurance Cup results ===
Year	Team	Car	Class	1	2	3	4	5	6	Pos.	Points
2012	Kessel Racing	Ferrari 458 Italia GT3	Pro	**MNZ**; 4	SIL; 11	**LEC**; 3	SPA; Ret	NÜR; 33	NAV; 6	10th	45
2013	Kessel Racing	Ferrari 458 Italia GT3	Pro-Am	MNZ; 37	SIL	LEC				NC	0
2013	DKR Engineering	BMW Z4 GT3	Pro-Am				SPA; Ret	NÜR		NC	0
2017	Ombra Racing	Lamborghini Huracán GT3	Pro	MNZ; 22	SIL; 15	LEC; Ret	SPA; 16	CAT; 23		NC	0
2018	Daiko Lazarus Racing	Lamborghini Huracán GT3	Silver	MNZ; 31	SIL; 34	LEC; Ret	SPA; Ret	CAT		14th	27
2019	Ombra Racing	Lamborghini Huracán GT3 Evo	Silver	MNZ; Ret	SIL; 26	LEC; 18	SPA; 37	CAT		18th	20

=== Complete FIA World Endurance Championship results ===
(key) (Races in bold indicate pole position; races in italics indicate fastest lap)

Year	Entrant	Class	Chassis	Engine	1	2	3	4	5	6	7	8	Rank	Points
2025	Proton Competition	LMGT3	Ford Mustang GT3	Ford Coyote 5.4 L V8	QAT; 10	IMO; 16	SPA; 2	LMS; Ret	SÃO; Ret	**COA**; 8	FUJ; Ret	BHR; 10	16th	27
2026	Proton Competition	LMGT3	Ford Mustang GT3 Evo	Ford Coyote 5.4 L V8	IMO; 8	SPA; 12	LMS; 11	SÃO; 5	COA	FUJ	CAT	MNZ	19th*	14*

=== Complete 24 Hours of Le Mans results ===
Year	Team	Co-drivers	Car	Class	Laps	Pos.	Class pos.
2025	(Germany) Proton Competition	(Italy) Giammarco Levorato (Norway) Dennis Olsen	Ford Mustang GT3	LMGT3	46	DNF	DNF
2026	(Germany) Proton Competition	(Italy) Giammarco Levorato (United States) Logan Sargeant	Ford Mustang GT3 Evo	LMGT3	323	49th	17th
