= Carlotta Fedeli =

Italian racing driver

- Nationality: (Italy) Italian
- Born: 3 February 1992 (age 34) Rome, Italy

TCR International Series career
- Debut season: 2016
- Current team: B.D. Racing
- Car number: 41
- Starts: 2

Previous series
- 2016 2015 2013-15 2012-13 2011 2007-10: SEAT León Cup Italy; TCR Italian Series; SEAT Ibiza Cup Italy; MINI Challenge Italy; Italian Production Championship; Karting

Carlotta Fedeli (born 3 February 1992) is an Italian racing driver currently competing in the TCR International Series & SEAT León Cup Italy. Having previously competed in the TCR Italian Series, SEAT Ibiza Cup Italy & MINI Challenge Italy amongst others.

== Racing career ==
Fedeli began her career in 2007 in Karting, she raced there for many seasons up until 2010. In 2011, she switched to the Italian Production Championship, she raced there up until 2012. She switched to the Italian MINI Challenge for 2012, finishing 12th in the championship standings that year. She continued in the series for 2013, however, only making four starts before switching to the Italian SEAT Ibiza Cup. For 2014 & 2015, she stayed in the championship, finishing fifth in the championship standings in 2015. She made a one-off appearance in the 2015 TCR Italian Series, taking two second-place finishes.

In May 2016, it was announced that Fedeli would race in the TCR International Series, driving a SEAT León Cup Racer for B.D. Racing.

In 2019, Fedeli attempted to qualify for the W Series, but failed to progress beyond the evaluation day.

== Racing record ==
=== Complete TCR International Series results ===
(key) (Races in bold indicate pole position) (Races in italics indicate fastest lap)

Year	Team	Car	1	2	3	4	5	6	7	8	9	10	11	12	13	14	15	16	17	18	19	20	21	22	DC	Points
2016	B.D. Racing	SEAT León TCR	BHR; 1	BHR; 2	POR; 1	POR; 2	BEL; 1	BEL; 2	ITA; 1; 9	ITA; 2; 11	AUT; 1	AUT; 2	GER; 1	GER; 2	RUS; 1	RUS; 2	THA; 1	THA; 2	SIN; 1	SIN; 2	MYS; 1	MYS; 2	MAC; 1	MAC; 2	32nd	2
