= Autodromo di Franciacorta =

Racing track in Lombardy, Italy

Porsche Experience Center Franciacorta
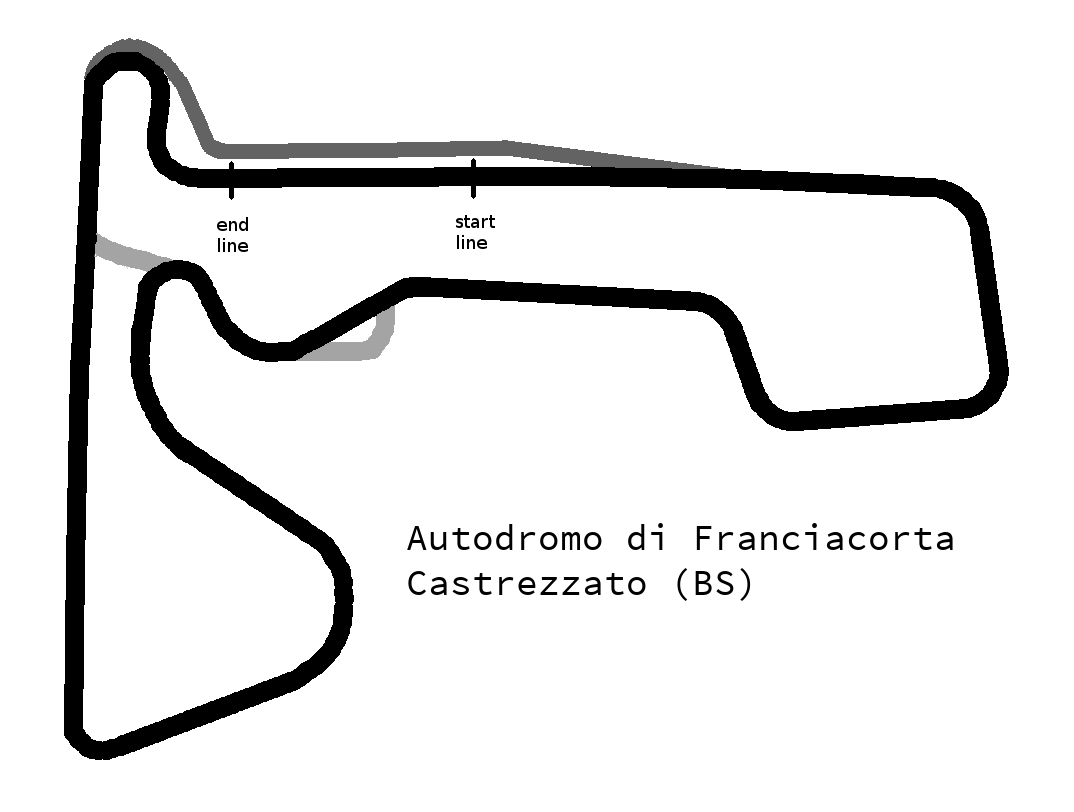
- Full Circuit (2008–present)
- Location: Castrezzato, Lombardy, Italy
- Coordinates: 45°30′42″N 10°0′19″E
- Capacity: 155,000
- FIA Grade: 2 (Note: Autodromo di Franciacorta's Grade 2 licence expired on 1 September 2024.)
- Owner: Porsche (November 2019–present)
- Broke ground: 2005
- Opened: 2006
- Former names: Autodromo di Franciacorta (2008–2021)
- Major events: Former: FIA World Rallycross Championship; World RX of Italy (2014–2015); Porsche Sprint Challenge Suisse (2022); NASCAR Whelen Euro Series (2017–2019); F2 Italian Formula Trophy (2014–2015); European Touring Car Cup (2010); Motocross of Nations (2009); Porsche Carrera Cup Italia (2011, 2021); Superstars Series (2013); Italian Sport Prototypes Championship (2013); Italian F3 (2011); Italian Superturismo Championship (2011)
- Website: http://autodromodifranciacorta.it/

Full Circuit (2008–present)
- Length: 2.519 km (1.565 mi)
- Turns: 13
- Race lap record: 1:05.969 ( (France) Brandon Maïsano, Dallara F308, 2011, F3)

Porsche Experience Center Franciacorta is a 2.519 km (1.565 mi) race track located in the homonymous area of Franciacorta from which it takes its name, in Castrezzato in the province of Brescia. The racetrack has received homologation from the FIA for motor racing competitions and from the FMI for motorcycling ones. The circuit was inaugurated in 2006.

The track hosted the NASCAR Whelen Euro Series from 2017 through 2019. In November 2019, the circuit was bought by Porsche and the circuit's name was changed as Porsche Experience Center Franciacorta in September 2021.

== Lap records ==
As of October 2021, the fastest official race lap records at the Autodromo di Franciacorta are listed as:

| Category | Time | Driver | Vehicle | Event |
Full Circuit (2008–present): 2.519 km (1.565 mi)
| Formula Three | 1:05.969 | Brandon Maïsano | Dallara F308 | 2011 Franciacorta Italian F3 round |
| Group CN | 1:07.745 | Davide Uboldi | Osella PA21 Evo | 2013 Franciacorta CISP round |
| Formula Abarth | 1:08.866 | Alessandro Perullo | Tatuus FA010 | 2014 Franciacorta F2 Italian Formula Trophy round |
| Porsche Carrera Cup | 1:09.310 | Aldo Festante | Porsche 911 (991 II) GT3 Cup | 2021 Franciacorta Porsche Carrera Cup Italia round |
| Stock car racing | 1:12.922 | Alon Day | Chevrolet SS NASCAR | 2018 Franciacorta NASCAR Whelen Euro Series round |
| Super 2000 | 1:26.838 | Michel Nykjær | SEAT León TDI | 2010 Franciacorta ETC round |
| Super 1600 | 1:32.985 | Carsten Seifert | Ford Fiesta ST | 2010 Franciacorta ETC round |
