= 2021 TCR Italy Touring Car Championship =

Motor race competition

The 2021 TCR Italy Touring Car Championship was the seventh season of the ITCC to run under TCR regulations and the 35th season since the national touring car series was revived in 1987 as the Campionato Italiano Turismo.

== Teams and drivers ==
Team	Car	No.	Drivers	Class	Rounds	Ref.
(Italy) Next Motorsport	Hyundai i30 N TCR	3	(Italy) Adriano Visdomini		5	
(Italy) Scuderia del Girasole Cupra Racing	Cupra León Competición TCR	4	(Italy) Salvatore Tavano		All	
(Italy) Scuderia del Girasole Cupra Racing	Cupra León Competición TCR	10	(Italy) Federico Paolino		All	
(Italy) Scuderia del Girasole Cupra Racing	Cupra León Competición TCR	21	(Italy) Nicola Guida		All	
(Italy) Scuderia del Girasole Cupra Racing	Cupra León TCR	6	(Italy) Raffaele Gurrieri		All	
(Italy) Scuderia del Girasole Cupra Racing	Cupra León TCR	90	(Italy) Denis Babuin	DSG	All	
(Italy) BF Motorsport	Audi RS 3 LMS TCR	7	(Italy) Sandro Pelatti		2	
(Italy) BF Motorsport	Audi RS 3 LMS TCR	93	(Italy) Omar Fiorucci	DSG	1–2	
(Italy) BF Motorsport	Audi RS 3 LMS TCR	96	(Italy) Alberto Rodio	DSG	5	
(Italy) BF Motorsport	Audi RS 3 LMS TCR	68	(Italy) Eric Brigliadori		1–4, 6	
(Italy) BF Motorsport	Hyundai i30 N TCR	68	(Italy) Eric Brigliadori		5	
(Italy) Target Competition	Hyundai i30 N TCR	8	(Italy) Nicola Baldan		All	
(Italy) Target Competition	Hyundai i30 N TCR	13	(Finland) Antti Buri		All	
(Italy) Target Competition	Hyundai i30 N TCR	23	(Italy) Fabio Antonello		5–6	
(Italy) Target Competition	Hyundai i30 N TCR	56	(Italy) Cesare Brusa		4	
(Italy) Race Lab	Audi RS 3 LMS TCR	9	(Italy) Matteo Poloni		1–2, 5–6	
(Italy) Trico WRT	Hyundai i30 N TCR	11	(Italy) Damiano Reduzzi		1–2	
(Spain) RC2 Junior Team	Cupra León Competición TCR	12	(Spain) Felipe Fernández		5	
(Spain) RC2 Junior Team	Cupra León Competición TCR	15	(Venezuela) Sergio Lopez Bolotin		5	
(North Macedonia) LPR Stefanovski Racing Team	Hyundai i30 N TCR	14	(North Macedonia) Igor Stefanovski		1–5	
(Spain) Volcano Motorsport	Cupra León Competición TCR	16	(Russia) Evgeni Leonov		1–4	
(Spain) Volcano Motorsport	Cupra León Competición TCR	69	(Spain) Mikel Azcona		4	
(Slovakia) Brutal Fish Racing Team	Honda Civic Type R TCR (FK8)	17	(Slovakia) Martin Ryba		4	
(Italy) MM Motorsport	Honda Civic Type R TCR (FK8)	28	(Italy) Marco Iannotta		5–6	
(Italy) MM Motorsport	Honda Civic Type R TCR (FK8)	62	(United Kingdom) Jack Young		2	
(Italy) MM Motorsport	Honda Civic Type R TCR (FK8)	63	(Russia) Ibragim Akhmadov		4	
(Italy) MM Motorsport	Honda Civic Type R TCR (FK8)	72	(Argentina) Franco Girolami		2	
(Italy) TecniEngines	Audi RS 3 LMS TCR	22	(Italy) Piero Necchi		2, 6	
(Italy) Tecnodom Sport	Honda Civic Type R TCR (FK8)	24	(Italy) Jonathan Giacon		1–3	
(Estonia) ALM Honda Racing	Honda Civic Type R TCR (FK8)	25	(Estonia) Mattias Vahtel		All	
(Estonia) ALM Honda Racing	Honda Civic Type R TCR (FK8)	27	(Estonia) Ruben Volt		All	
(Italy) Aggressive Italia	Hyundai i30 N TCR	31	(Italy) Kevin Ceccon		All	
(Austria) AIR Racing Osttirol	Audi RS 3 LMS TCR	32	(Austria) Sandro Soubek		5	
(Austria) AIR Racing Osttirol	Audi RS 3 LMS TCR	43	(Austria) Sandro Soubek		6	
(Italy) Proteam Motorsport	Cupra León TCR	33	(Italy) Riccardo Romagnoli		All	
(Italy) Élite Motorsport	Cupra León Competición TCR	44	(Italy) Michele Imberti		2–6	
(Italy) Élite Motorsport	Cupra León Competición TCR	61	(Italy) Michele Imberti		1	
(Italy) Élite Motorsport	Volkswagen Golf GTI TCR	82	(Italy) Marco Butti	DSG	All	
(Italy) Élite Motorsport	Volkswagen Golf GTI TCR	92	(Italy) 'Linos'	DSG	4	
(Italy) CRM Motorsport	Hyundai i30 N TCR	47	(Italy) Ettore Carminati		1–2, 4–5	
(Czech Republic) ACCR Czech Talent Team / K2 Engine	Hyundai i30 N TCR	59	(Czech Republic) Dušan Kouřil Jr.		1–2, 4–5	
(Italy) CRC - Cappellari Reparto Corse	Volkswagen Golf GTI TCR	76	(Italy) Daniele Cappellari		3	
(Italy) DMP Motors / Scuderia Vesuvio	Cupra León TCR	84	(Italy) Sabatino di Mare	DSG	All	
(Italy) 6ix Engineers	Cupra León TCR	85	(Italy) Giorgio Fantilli	DSG	1–5	
(Italy) Faro Racing	SEAT León TCR	86	(Italy) Alessandro Berton	DSG	1	
(Italy) Faro Racing	SEAT León TCR	86	(Italy) Andrea Tronconi	DSG	1	
(Italy) Faro Racing	Volkswagen Golf GTI TCR	91	(Italy) Giuseppe de Virgilio	DSG	1	
(Italy) Faro Racing	Volkswagen Golf GTI TCR	97	(Italy) Alberto Tapparo	DSG	4	

Icon	Class
DSG	DSG Challenge

== Calendar and results ==
Rnd.		Circuit	Date	Pole position	Fastest lap	Winning driver	Winning team	DSG Winner	Supporting
1	1	Autodromo Nazionale Monza, Monza	30 April-2 May	(Italy) Eric Brigliadori	(Italy) Nicola Baldan	(Italy) Salvatore Tavano	(Italy) Scuderia del Girasole	(Italy) Sabatino di Mare	Italian GT Championship
1	2	Autodromo Nazionale Monza, Monza	30 April-2 May		(Italy) Eric Brigliadori	(Italy) Salvatore Tavano	(Italy) Scuderia del Girasole	(Italy) Denis Babuin	Italian GT Championship
2	3	Misano World Circuit Marco Simoncelli, Misano Adriatico	4-6 June	(Argentina) Franco Girolami	(United Kingdom) Jack Young	(Argentina) Franco Girolami	(Italy) MM Motorsport	(Italy) Denis Babuin	Italian GT Championship
2	4	Misano World Circuit Marco Simoncelli, Misano Adriatico	4-6 June		(Finland) Antti Buri	(Finland) Antti Buri	(Italy) Target Competition	(Italy) Denis Babuin	Italian GT Championship
3	5	ACI Vallelunga Circuit, Campagnano di Roma	25-27 June	(Italy) Eric Brigliadori	(Italy) Eric Brigliadori	(Italy) Eric Brigliadori	(Italy) BF Motorsport	(Italy) Denis Babuin	Italian F4 Championship
3	6	ACI Vallelunga Circuit, Campagnano di Roma	25-27 June		(Estonia) Mattias Vahtel	(Italy) Kevin Ceccon	(Italy) Aggressive Italia	(Italy) Denis Babuin	Italian F4 Championship
4	7	Autodromo Enzo e Dino Ferrari, Imola	23-25 July	(Spain) Mikel Azcona	(Spain) Mikel Azcona	(Italy) Kevin Ceccon	(Italy) Aggressive Italia	(Italy) Denis Babuin	Italian F4 Championship
4	8	Autodromo Enzo e Dino Ferrari, Imola	23-25 July		(Spain) Mikel Azcona	(Spain) Mikel Azcona	(Spain) Volcano Motorsport	(Italy) Denis Babuin	Italian F4 Championship
5	9	Autodromo Enzo e Dino Ferrari, Imola	3-5 September	(Italy) Salvatore Tavano	(Czech Republic) Dušan Kouřil Jr.	(Italy) Salvatore Tavano	(Italy) Scuderia del Girasole	(Italy) Sabatino di Mare	Michelin Pilot Challenge
5	10	Autodromo Enzo e Dino Ferrari, Imola	3-5 September		(Italy) Kevin Ceccon	(Italy) Kevin Ceccon	(Italy) Aggressive Italia	(Italy) Denis Babuin	Michelin Pilot Challenge
6	11	Mugello Circuit, Scarperia	8-10 October	(Finland) Antti Buri	(Italy) Marco Iannotta	(Finland) Antti Buri	(Italy) Target Competition	(Italy) Sabatino di Mare	Italian GT Championship
6	12	Mugello Circuit, Scarperia	8-10 October		(Finland) Antti Buri	(Italy) Kevin Ceccon	(Italy) Aggressive Italia	(Italy) Marco Butti	Italian GT Championship

== Championship standings ==
=== Drivers' Championship ===
Scoring systems

Position	**1st**	**2nd**	**3rd**	**4th**	**5th**	**6th**	**7th**	**8th**	**9th**	**10th**	**11th**	**12th**	**13th**	**14th**	**15th**
Qualifying	10	9	8	7	6	5	4	3	2	1	—N/a				
Race	40	35	30	27	24	21	18	15	13	11	9	7	5	3	1

Pos.	Driver	MNZ (Italy)		MIS (Italy)		VAL (Italy)		IMO1 (Italy)		IMO2 (Italy)		MUG (Italy)		Pts.
1	(Finland) Antti Buri	5^{5}	9	2^{3}	1	3^{4}	2	5^{8}	2	5	Ret	1	2	358
2	(Italy) Kevin Ceccon	3^{7}	3	4^{9}	4	4^{6}	1	1^{2}	Ret	Ret	1	4	1	357
3	(Italy) Salvatore Tavano	1^{3}	1	7	16	2^{3}	3	6^{9}	10	1	4	3	4	343
4	(Italy) Nicola Baldan	6^{10}	6	3^{2}	2	5^{2}	5	4	5	2	2	5	Ret	316
5	(Italy) Eric Brigliadori	**2**^{1}	2	5	5	**1**^{1}	4	8^{5}	20†	9	5	7	Ret	289
6	(Estonia) Ruben Volt	14	13	6^{10}	6	9^{7}	13	7^{6}	3	6	Ret	Ret	6	181
7	(Italy) Michele Imberti	12	5	11	Ret	13^{5}	6	10^{10}	16	3	22	6	3	176
8	(North Macedonia) Igor Stefanovski	4^{4}	23†	Ret^{6}	8	6^{10}	17†	2^{4}	Ret	8	6			155
9	(Estonia) Mattias Vahtel	11^{8}	4	10	20†	17†^{8}	12	Ret	6	7	3	DNS	DNS	134
10	(Italy) Riccardo Romagnoli	24†	12	9	7	8	7	Ret	7	14	13	Ret	10	108
11	(Italy) Federico Paolino	17	10	15	15	Ret	8	12	19	12	8	11	11	73
12	(Italy) Denis Babuin	19	14	17	10	10	9	11	11	EX	12	15	15	65
13	(Italy) Raffaele Gurrieri	13	11	Ret	11	Ret	15	Ret	13	16	17	8	14	46
14	(Italy) Sabatino di Mare	18	15	18	12	12	Ret	17	15	13	21	9	9	45
15	(Italy) Marco Butti	20	16	Ret	14	16	10	13	Ret	15	15	13	8	41
16	(Italy) Nicola Guida	21	22†	16	13	11	11	15	14	Ret	14	14	13	38
17	(Italy) Giorgio Fantilli	Ret	21	20	18	15	14	18	17	18	19			4
Drivers not eligible for points
	(Russia) Evgeni Leonov	9^{9}	Ret	13	Ret	7^{9}	Ret	3^{3}	4					(105)
	(Italy) Matteo Poloni	7^{2}	8	21	Ret					Ret	23	11	5	(87)
	(Czech Republic) Dušan Kouřil Jr.	15	18	8^{8}	Ret			19	12	4	20			(59)
	(Italy) Jonathan Giacon	8^{6}	7	14	9	DNS	DNS							(54)
	(Austria) Sandro Soubek									Ret	Ret	2	7	(54)
	(Italy) Ettore Carminati	10	20	12	Ret			9	21†	11	10			(51)
	(Argentina) Franco Girolami			**1**^{1}	Ret									(50)
	(Spain) Mikel Azcona							**Ret**^{1}	1					(50)
	(Italy) Marco Iannotta									10	7	16	12	(41)
	(United Kingdom) Jack Young			Ret^{4}	3									(37)
	(Italy) Antonello Fabio									Ret	9	10	Ret	(22)
	(Slovakia) Martin Ryba							14	8					(18)
	(Russia) Ibraghim Akhmadov							Ret	9					(13)
	(Spain) Felipe Fernández									19	11			(9)
	(Italy) Damiano Reduzzi	16	Ret	Ret^{7}	19†									(4)
	(Italy) Daniele Cappellari					14	16							(3)
	(Italy) 'Linos'							16	Ret					(0)
	(Italy) Omar Fiorucci	22	19	19	17									(0)
	(Italy) Giuseppe de Virgilio	23	17											(0)
	(Italy) Alberto Tapparo							19	18					(0)
	(Italy) Cesare Brusa							21	Ret					(0)
	(Italy) Alberto Rodio									17	18			(0)
	(Venezuela) Sergio Lopez Bolotin									20	Ret			(0)
	(Italy) Adriano Visdomini									Ret	16			(0)
	(Italy) Piero Necchi			Ret	DNS							Ret	DNS	(0)
	(Italy) Alessandro Berton (Italy) Andrea Tronconi	DNS	DNS											-
	(Italy) Sandro Pelatti			DNS	DNS									-
Pos.	Driver	MNZ (Italy)		MIS (Italy)		VAL (Italy)		IMO1 (Italy)		IMO2 (Italy)		MUG (Italy)		Pts.

Colour	Result
Gold	Winner
Silver	Second place
Bronze	Third place
Green	Points classification
Blue	Non-points classification
Blue	Non-classified finish (NC)
Purple	Retired, not classified (Ret)
Red	Did not qualify (DNQ)
Red	Did not pre-qualify (DNPQ)
Black	Disqualified (DSQ)
White	Did not start (DNS)
White	Withdrew (WD)
White	Race cancelled (C)
Blank	Did not practice (DNP)
Blank	Did not arrive (DNA)
Blank	Excluded (EX)

**Bold** – Pole
Italics – Fastest Lap

=== Teams' Championship ===
Pos.	Driver	MNZ (Italy)		MIS (Italy)		VAL (Italy)		IMO1 (Italy)		IMO2 (Italy)		MUG (Italy)		Pts.
1	(Italy) Target Competition	5	6	2	1	3	2	4	2	2	2	1	2	503
2	(Italy) Scuderia del Girasole Cupra Racing	1	1	7	11	2	3	6	10	1	4	3	4	467
3	(Italy) Aggressive Italia	3	3	4	4	4	1	1	Ret	Ret	1	4	1	464
4	(Italy) BF Motorsport	2	2	5	5	1	4	8	20	9	5	7	Ret	371
5	(Estonia) ALM Honda Racing	11	4	6	6	9	12	7	3	6	3	Ret	6	361
6	(North Macedonia) LPR Stefanovski Racing Team	4	23†	Ret	8	6	17†	2	Ret	8	6			212
7	(Italy) Élite Motorsport	12	5	11	14	13	6	10	16	3	15	6	3	190
8	(Spain) Volcano Motorsport	9	Ret	13	Ret	7	Ret	3	1					181
9	(Italy) Proteam Motorsport	24†	12	9	7	8	7	Ret	7	14	13	Ret	10	174
10	(Italy) MM Motorsport			1	3			14	8	10	7	16	12	170
11	(Austria) AIR Racing Osttirol									Ret	Ret	2	7	53
12	(Italy) CRM Motorsport	10	20	12	Ret			9	21†	11	10			51
13	(Czech Republic) ACCR Czech Talent Team; K2 Engine	15	18	8	Ret			20	12	4	20			50
14	(Italy) Tecnodom Sport	8	7	14	9	DNS	DNS							49
15	(Italy) Race Lab	7	8	21	Ret					Ret	23	11	5	33
16	(Slovakia) Brutal Fish Racing Team							14	8					18
17	(Italy) DMP Motors; Scuderia Vesuvio	18	15	18	12	12	Ret	17	15	13	21	9	9	14
18	(Spain) RC2 Junior Team									19	11			9
19	(Italy) 6ix Engineers	Ret	21	20	18	15	14	18	17	18	19			4
20	(Italy) CRC - Cappellari Reparto Corse					14	16							3
21	(Italy) Trico WRT	16	Ret	Ret	19†									0
22	(Italy) Next Motorsport									Ret	16			0
23	(Italy) Faro Racing	23	17					19	18					0
24	(Italy) TecniEngines			Ret	DNS							Ret	DNS	0
Pos.	Driver	MNZ (Italy)		MIS (Italy)		VAL (Italy)		IMO1 (Italy)		IMO2 (Italy)		MUG (Italy)		Pts.

Colour	Result
Gold	Winner
Silver	Second place
Bronze	Third place
Green	Points classification
Blue	Non-points classification
Blue	Non-classified finish (NC)
Purple	Retired, not classified (Ret)
Red	Did not qualify (DNQ)
Red	Did not pre-qualify (DNPQ)
Black	Disqualified (DSQ)
White	Did not start (DNS)
White	Withdrew (WD)
White	Race cancelled (C)
Blank	Did not practice (DNP)
Blank	Did not arrive (DNA)
Blank	Excluded (EX)

**Bold** – Pole
Italics – Fastest Lap
