= 2016 Italian Touring Car Championship =

Motor race competition

Seasons
- ← 2015 2017 →

The 2016 Italian Touring Car Championship is the second season of the ITCC to run under TCR regulations and the 30th season since a national touring car series was revived in 1987 as the Campionato Italiano Turismo. Starting from this year, the championship takes place of Campionato Italiano Turismo Endurance and it will be divided into TCR and TCS class. The latter will include cars between 1.400 and 2.000cc, nearer to the production series.

== Teams and drivers ==
Hankook is the official tyre supplier.

| Team | Car | No. | Drivers | Rounds |
|---|---|---|---|---|
TCR Class
| (Italy) BF Motorsport | SEAT León Cup Racer | 2 | (Italy) Vincenzo Montalbano | 1-2 |
| (Italy) BF Motorsport | SEAT León Cup Racer | 2 | (Italy) Eugenio Pisani | 1 |
| (Italy) BF Motorsport | SEAT León Cup Racer | 2 | (Italy) Imerio Brigliadori | 2 |
| (Italy) BF Motorsport | SEAT León Cup Racer | 7 | (Italy) Romy Dall'Antonia | 1-4, 6-7 |
| (Italy) BF Motorsport | SEAT León Cup Racer | 7 | (Italy) Samuele Piccin | 1-4, 6-7 |
| (Italy) BF Motorsport | SEAT León Cup Racer | 8 | (Italy) Fabio Fabiani | 1-3 |
| (Italy) BF Motorsport | SEAT León Cup Racer | 8 | (Italy) Emiliano Giorgi | 1 |
| (Italy) BF Motorsport | SEAT León Cup Racer | 8 | (Italy) Daniele Verrocchio | 2 |
| (Italy) BF Motorsport | SEAT León Cup Racer | 8 | (Italy) Marika Diana | 3 |
| (Italy) 2T Course & Reglage | Citroën C3 Max TCR | 3 | (Italy) Marco Della Monica | 1 |
| (Italy) 2T Course & Reglage | Citroën C3 Max TCR | 3 | (Italy) Andrea Stassano | 1 |
| (Italy) 2T Course & Reglage | Citroën C3 Max TCR | 3 | (Italy) Giovanni Lopes | 2 |
| (Italy) 2T Course & Reglage | Citroën C3 Max TCR | 3 | (Italy) Dario Pennica | 2 |
| (Italy) 2T Course & Reglage | Citroën C3 Max TCR | 3 | (Italy) Gianluca Mauriello | 4 |
| (Italy) 2T Course & Reglage | Citroën C3 Max TCR | 3 | (Italy) Massimo Arduini | 4 |
| (Italy) 2T Course & Reglage | Citroën C3 Max TCR | 3 | (Italy) Giovanni Mancini | 5 |
| (Italy) 2T Course & Reglage | Citroën C3 Max TCR | 3 | (Italy) Lorenzo Baroni | 5 |
| (Italy) BRC Racing Team | SEAT León Cup Racer | 4 | (Italy) Marco Costamagna | 1-2, 4, 6 |
| (Italy) BRC Racing Team | SEAT León Cup Racer | 11 | (Italy) Gianluigi Ghione | 3, 5 |
| (Italy) BRC Racing Team | SEAT León Cup Racer | 11 | (Italy) Mariano Costamagna | 4, 7 |
| (Italy) BRC Racing Team | SEAT León Cup Racer | 10 | (Italy) Mariano Costamagna | 5 |
| (Italy) BRC Racing Team | SEAT León Cup Racer | 36 | (Italy) Alberto Biraghi | 3 |
| (Italy) BRC Racing Team | SEAT León Cup Racer | 47 | (Italy) Alberto Viberti | 1-6 |
| (Italy) AGS Motorsport | Honda Civic TCR | 5 | (Italy) Roberto Colciago | 1-6 |
| (Italy) MM Motorsport | Honda Civic TCR | 6 | (Italy) Emanuele Alborghetti | 4 |
| (Italy) MM Motorsport | Honda Civic TCR | 6 | (Finland) Aku Pellinen | 7 |
| (Italy) MM Motorsport | SEAT León Cup Racer | 21 | (Italy) Luigi Bamonte | 2, 4, 6-7 |
| (Italy) Tecnodom Sport | SEAT León TCR | 9 | (Italy) Jonathan Giacon | 1 |
| (Italy) NOS Racing | SEAT León Cup Racer | 14 | (Italy) Massimiliano Chini | 1 |
| (Italy) NOS Racing | SEAT León Cup Racer | 14 | (Italy) Nello Nataloni | 1 |
| (Italy) Top Run | Subaru Impreza STi TCR | 16 | (Italy) Luigi Ferrara | 7 |
| (Czech Republic) Krenek Motorsport | SEAT León Cup Racer | 19 | (Czech Republic) Petr Fulin | 6 |
| (Italy) Pit Lane Competizioni | SEAT León Cup Racer | 41 | (Italy) Enrico Bettera | 3-4, 7 |
| (Italy) Esse Motorsport | SEAT León Cup Racer | 40 | (Italy) Massimiliano Gagliano | 3 |
| (Italy) CRC – Team Bassano | SEAT León Cup Racer | 76 | (Italy) Daniele Cappellari | All |
| (United Kingdom) VFR Racing | Honda Civic TCR | 80 | (United Kingdom) Finlay Crocker | 4, 6 |
TCS Class
| (Italy) SEAT Motorsport Italia | SEAT León Cupra ST | 101 | (United Kingdom) Giampiero Wyhinny | 3-4, 6-7 |
| (Italy) SEAT Motorsport Italia | SEAT León Cupra ST | 101 | (Italy) Orfei Emiliano Perucca | 5 |
| (Italy) SEAT Motorsport Italia | SEAT León Cupra ST | 107 | (Italy) Sandro Pelatti | 4-7 |
| (Italy) SEAT Motorsport Italia | SEAT León Cupra ST | 108 | (Italy) Alberto Bassi | All |
| (Italy) JAS Motorsport | Honda Civic Type-R | 105 | (Italy) Roberto Colciago | 7 |
| (Italy) JAS Motorsport | Honda Civic Type-R | 115 | (Sweden) Hugo Nerman | 1 |
| (Italy) WP Racing | SEAT Ibiza | 205 | (Italy) Davide Pigozzi | 4-7 |
| (Italy) WP Racing | SEAT Ibiza | 205 | (Italy) Marco Baroncini | 6 |
| (Italy) Leone Matteo | Alfa Romeo Giulietta 1.8 | 206 | (Italy) Matteo Leone | 5 |
| (Italy) Leone Matteo | Alfa Romeo Giulietta 1.8 | 206 | (Italy) Riccardo Missiroli | 5 |
| (Italy) 2T Course & Reglage | Peugeot 308 Mi16 | 308 | (Italy) Massimo Arduini | 1-2 |
| (Italy) 2T Course & Reglage | Peugeot 308 Mi16 | 308 | (Italy) Renato Gaiofatto | 1-2 |
| (Italy) 2T Course & Reglage | Citroën C3 Max | 603 | (Italy) Alberto Sabbatini | 6 |
| (Italy) 2T Course & Reglage | Citroën C3 Max | 603 | (Italy) Francesco Neri | 6 |
| (Italy) 2T Course & Reglage | Citroën C3 Max | 603 | (Italy) Paolo Pirovano | 7 |
| (Italy) 2T Course & Reglage | Citroën C3 Max | 603 | (Italy) Alessandro Baccani | 7 |
| (Italy) Tecnodom Sport | Alfa Romeo MiTo QV | 403 | (Italy) Kevin Giacon | 1-4 |
| (Italy) Tecnodom Sport | Alfa Romeo MiTo QV | 404 | (Italy) Silvano Bolzoni | 1-4 |
| (Italy) Tecnodom Sport | Abarth 595 OT | 408 | (Italy) Tobia Zarpellon | 4 |
| (Italy) V-Action Zatti Sport | Abarth 595 OT | 405 | (Finland) Juuso-Matti Pajuranta | 1 |
| (Italy) V-Action Zatti Sport | Abarth 595 OT | 406 | (Portugal) Manuel Fernandes | 1 |
TCT Class
| (Italy) Bacci Andrea | Alfa Romeo Giulietta QV | 602 | (Italy) Andrea Bacci | 5-7 |
| (Italy) Mosca Andrea | Alfa Romeo Giulietta QV | 603 | (Italy) Andrea Mosca | 5 |
| (Italy) Mosca Andrea | Alfa Romeo Giulietta QV | 604 | (Italy) Andrea Mosca | 6-7 |
| (Italy) Scuderia Giudici | Alfa Romeo Giulietta QV | 605 | (Italy) Gianni Giudici | 7 |

== Calendar and results ==
The 2016 schedule was announced on 23 November 2015, with all events scheduled to be held in Italy. On 23 January, the Vallelunga round was postponed from 17 April to 4 September. On 16 March, the first round in Monza was moved forward to 30 October, while Adria was anticipated to 8 May.

| Rnd. | | Circuit | Date | Pole position | Fastest lap | Winning driver | Winning team | Supporting |
|---|---|---|---|---|---|---|---|---|
| 1 | 1 | Adria International Raceway, Adria | 7 May | (Italy) Roberto Colciago | (Italy) Roberto Colciago | (Italy) Roberto Colciago | (Italy) AGS Motorsport | Italian Formula 4 Championship; Auto GP Formula Open |
| 1 | 2 | Adria International Raceway, Adria | 8 May | (Italy) Roberto Colciago | (Italy) Roberto Colciago | (Italy) Roberto Colciago | (Italy) AGS Motorsport | Italian Formula 4 Championship; Auto GP Formula Open |
| 2 | 3 | Misano World Circuit Marco Simoncelli, Misano Adriatico | 12 June | (Italy) Imerio Brigliadori | (Italy) Roberto Colciago | (Italy) Roberto Colciago | (Italy) AGS Motorsport | TCR Trophy Europe; Italian GT Championship; Porsche Carrera Cup Italia |
| 2 | 4 | Misano World Circuit Marco Simoncelli, Misano Adriatico | 12 June | (Italy) Alberto Viberti | (Italy) Roberto Colciago | (Italy) Alberto Viberti | (Italy) BRC Racing Team | TCR Trophy Europe; Italian GT Championship; Porsche Carrera Cup Italia |
| 3 | 5 | Autodromo dell'Umbria, Magione | 3 July | (Italy) Roberto Colciago | (Italy) Roberto Colciago | (Italy) Roberto Colciago | (Italy) AGS Motorspor | |
| 3 | 6 | Autodromo dell'Umbria, Magione | 3 July | (Italy) Roberto Colciago | (Italy) Roberto Colciago | (Italy) Roberto Colciago | (Italy) AGS Motorsport | |
| 4 | 7 | Mugello Circuit, Scarperia | 17 July | (Italy) Alberto Viberti | (Italy) Roberto Colciago | (Italy) Roberto Colciago | (Italy) AGS Motorsport | Italian GT Championship; Italian Formula 4 Championship; Porsche Carrera Cup Italia |
| 4 | 8 | Mugello Circuit, Scarperia | 17 July | (Italy) Alberto Viberti | (Italy) Roberto Colciago | (Italy) Alberto Viberti | (Italy) BRC Racing Team | Italian GT Championship; Italian Formula 4 Championship; Porsche Carrera Cup Italia |
| 5 | 9 | ACI Vallelunga Circuit, Campagnano di Roma | 4 September | (Italy) Roberto Colciago | (Italy) Roberto Colciago | (Italy) Roberto Colciago | (Italy) AGS Motorsport | Porsche Carrera Cup Italia |
| 5 | 10 | ACI Vallelunga Circuit, Campagnano di Roma | 4 September | (Italy) Roberto Colciago | (Italy) Roberto Colciago | (Italy) Roberto Colciago | (Italy) AGS Motorsport | Porsche Carrera Cup Italia |
| 6 | 11 | Autodromo Enzo e Dino Ferrari, Imola | 25 September | (Italy) Alberto Viberti | (Italy) Alberto Viberti | (Italy) Alberto Viberti | (Italy) BRC Racing Team | Italian GT Championship; Italian Formula 4 Championship; Porsche Carrera Cup Italia |
| 6 | 12 | Autodromo Enzo e Dino Ferrari, Imola | 25 September | (Italy) Alberto Viberti | (Italy) Alberto Viberti | (Italy) Alberto Viberti | (Italy) BRC Racing Team | Italian GT Championship; Italian Formula 4 Championship; Porsche Carrera Cup Italia |
| 7 | 13 | Autodromo Nazionale Monza, Monza | 30 October | (Finland) Aku Pellinen | (Italy) Enrico Bettera | (Finland) Aku Pellinen | (Italy) MM Motorsport | Italian Formula 4 Championship |
| 7 | 14 | Autodromo Nazionale Monza, Monza | 30 October | (Italy) Enrico Bettera | (Italy) Enrico Bettera | (Italy) Enrico Bettera | (Italy) Pit Lane Competizioni | Italian Formula 4 Championship |

== Championship standings ==
=== Drivers' Championship ===
| Pos. | Driver | ADR^{1} | | MIS | | MAG | | MUG | | VLL | | IMO | | MON | | Pts. |
| Pos. | Driver | RD1 | RD2 | RD1 | RD2 | RD1 | RD2 | RD1 | RD2 | RD1 | RD2 | RD1 | RD2 | RD1 | RD2 | Pts. |
TCR class
| 1 | (Italy) Roberto Colciago | **1** | **1** | 1 | 2 | **1** | **1** | 1 | 8 | **1** | **1** | 3 | 2 | | | 221 |
| 2 | (Italy) Alberto Viberti | 2 | 2 | Ret | **1** | 5 | 2 | **2** | **1** | 2 | 2 | **1** | **1** | | | 184 |
| 3 | (Italy) Romy Dall'Antonia (Italy) Samuele Piccin | 5 | 4 | 3 | 3 | 3 | 8 | 5 | 2 | | | 4 | 5 | 5 | 2 | 113 |
| 4 | (Italy) Daniele Cappellari | 6 | 5 | Ret | 4 | 7 | 6 | 6 | 4 | 3 | 3 | 6 | 6 | 4 | 3 | 92 (96) |
| 5 | (Italy) Enrico Bettera | | | | | 6 | 3 | 3 | Ret | | | | | 2 | **1** | 67 |
| 6 | (Italy) Marco Costamagna | 8 | 3 | 5 | 6 | | | 7 | 5 | | | 5 | 8 | | | 48 |
| 7 | (Italy) Vincenzo Montalbano | 4 | 6 | **2** | 5 | | | | | | | | | | | 36 |
| 8 | (Italy) Luigi Bamonte | | | 6 | 7 | | | 9 | 6 | | | 8 | 7 | 6 | 4 | 36 |
| 9 | (United Kingdom) Finlay Crocker | | | | | | | 4 | 3 | | | 7 | 5 | | | 32 |
| 10 | (Czech Republic) Peter Fulin | | | | | | | | | | | 2 | 3 | | | 27 |
| 11 | (Italy) Mariano Costamagna | | | | | | | Ret | DNS | 5 | 5 | | | 7 | 5 | 25 |
| 12 | (Italy) Imerio Brigliadori | | | **2** | 5 | | | | | | | | | | | 23 |
| 13 | (Finland) Aku Pellinen | | | | | | | | | | | | | **1** | Ret | 21 |
| 14 | (Italy) Fabio Fabiani | 7 | 7 | 4 | Ret | 9 | 9 | | | | | | | | | 20 |
| 14 | (Italy) Massimiliano Gagliano | | | | | 2 | 7 | | | | | | | | | 19 |
| 15 | (Italy) Gianluigi Ghione | | | | | 8 | 4 | | | Ret | 4 | | | | | 19 |
| 16 | (Italy) Alberto Biraghi | | | | | 4 | 5 | | | | | | | | | 15 |
| 17 | (Italy) Eugenio Pissani | 4 | 6 | | | | | | | | | | | | | 13 |
| 18 | (Italy) Jonathan Giacon | 3 | Ret | | | | | | | | | | | | | 12 |
| 19 | (Italy) Luigi Ferrara | | | | | | | | | | | | | 3 | Ret | 12 |
| 20 | (Italy) Daniele Verrocchio | | | 4 | DNS | | | | | | | | | | | 8 |
| 21 | (Italy) Giovanni Mancini (Italy) Lorenzo Baroni | | | | | | | | | 4 | Ret | | | | | 8 |
| 22 | (Italy) Emiliano Giorgi | 7 | 7 | | | | | | | | | | | | | 8 |
| 23 | (Italy) Giovanni Lopes (Italy) Dario Pennica | | | 7 | 8 | | | | | | | | | | | 7 |
| 24 | (Italy) Gianluca Mauriello (Italy) Massimo Arduini | | | | | | | 8 | 7 | | | | | | | 7 |
| 25 | (Italy) Massimiliano Chini (Italy) Nello Nataloni | 9 | 8 | | | | | | | | | | | | | 5 |
| 26 | (Italy) Marika Diana | | | | | 9 | 9 | | | | | | | | | 4 |
| 27 | (Italy) Marco Della Monica (Italy) Andrea Stassano | 10† | DNS | | | | | | | | | | | | | 1 |
| 28 | (Italy) Emanuele Alborghetti | | | | | | | Ret | Ret | | | | | | | 0 |
TCS class
| 1 | (Sweden) Hugo Nerman | **10** | **9** | | | | | | | | | | | | | 20 |
| 2 | (Italy) Massimo Arduini (Italy) Renato Gaiofatto | 11 | 10 | | | | | | | | | | | | | 20 |
| 3 | (Italy) Kevin Giacon | 13 | 11 | | | | | | | | | | | | | 20 |
| 4 | (Finland) Juuso-Matti Pajuranta | 14 | 12 | | | | | | | | | | | | | 20 |
| 5 | (Italy) Alberto Bassi | 12 | 15† | | | | | | | | | | | | | 20 |
| 6 | (Italy) Silvano Bolzoni | 16 | 13 | | | | | | | | | | | | | 20 |
| 7 | (Portugal) Manuel Fernandes | 15 | 14 | | | | | | | | | | | | | 20 |
| Pos. | Driver | ADR^{1} | | MIS | | MAG | | MUG | | VLL | | IMO | | MON | | Pts. |

| Colour | Result |
|---|---|
| Gold | Winner |
| Silver | Second place |
| Bronze | Third place |
| Green | Points classification |
| Blue | Non-points classification |
| Blue | Non-classified finish (NC) |
| Purple | Retired, not classified (Ret) |
| Red | Did not qualify (DNQ) |
| Red | Did not pre-qualify (DNPQ) |
| Black | Disqualified (DSQ) |
| White | Did not start (DNS) |
| White | Withdrew (WD) |
| White | Race cancelled (C) |
| Blank | Did not practice (DNP) |
| Blank | Did not arrive (DNA) |
| Blank | Excluded (EX) |

**Bold** – Pole
Italics – Fastest Lap

† – Drivers did not finish the race, but were classified as they completed over 50% of the race distance.

- **^1** - the Adria round assigned 5 points in every qualifying and race session to all the participants of the TCS class, regardless of the final result.
