= 2019 TCR Italy Touring Car Championship =

Motor race competition

The 2019 TCR Italy Touring Car Championship was the fifth season of the ITCC to run under TCR regulations and the 33rd season since the national touring car series was revived in 1987 as the Campionato Italiano Turismo. The series began at the Autodromo Nazionale Monza in April and concluded at the same track in October.

== Teams and drivers ==
| Team | Car | No. | Drivers | Class | Rounds |
|---|---|---|---|---|---|
| South Italy Racing Team | Opel Astra TCR | 2 | (Italy) Andrea Argenti | | 1−2, 6 |
| (Italy) PRS Motorsport | Alfa Romeo Giulietta TCR | 3 | (Italy) Massimiliano Mugelli | | All |
| (Italy) Scuderia del Girasole Cupra Racing | CUPRA León TCR | 4 | (Italy) Salvatore Tavano | | All |
| (Italy) Scuderia del Girasole Cupra Racing | CUPRA León TCR | 19 | (Italy) Eric Scalvini | DSG; U25 | All |
| (Italy) Scuderia del Girasole Cupra Racing | CUPRA León TCR | 34 | (Italy) Matteo Greco | U25 | All |
| (Switzerland) Race Republic | Honda Civic Type R TCR (FK2) | 5 | (Italy) Luca Segù | | 5 |
| (Switzerland) Race Republic | Honda Civic Type R TCR (FK2) | 5 | (Switzerland) Stefano Comini | | 5 |
| (Switzerland) Race Republic | Honda Civic Type R TCR (FK2) | 7 | (Russia) Denis Grigoriev | | 4 |
| (Switzerland) Race Republic | CUPRA León TCR | 47 | (Russia) Lev Tolkachev | | 7 |
| (Italy) Scuderia del Girasole | Audi RS 3 LMS TCR | 7 | (Italy) Sandro Pelatti | DSG | 7 |
| (Italy) Scuderia del Girasole | Audi RS 3 LMS TCR | 21 | (Italy) Nicola Guida | DSG | 7 |
| (Estonia) MM Motorsport | Honda Civic Type R TCR (FK2) | 8 | (Russia) Lev Tolkachev | | 1 |
| (Estonia) MM Motorsport | Honda Civic Type R TCR (FK2) | 9 | (Italy) Davide Nardilli | U25 | 1−4 |
| (Estonia) MM Motorsport | Honda Civic Type R TCR (FK8) | 10 | (Italy) Kevin Giacon | | 4 |
| (Serbia) Lein Racing | CUPRA León TCR | 11 | (Serbia) Nikola Miljković | | 7 |
| (Russia) LTA Rally | Audi RS 3 LMS TCR | 14 | (Russia) Klim Gavrilov | U25 | 1 |
| (Russia) VRC-Team | Audi RS 3 LMS TCR | 14 | (Russia) Klim Gavrilov | U25 | 4 |
| (North Macedonia) LPR Stefanovski Racing Team | CUPRA León TCR | 14 | (North Macedonia) Igor Stefanovski | | 2−3, 5 |
| (Italy) N Motors | Opel Astra TCR | 18 | (Italy) Nello Nataloni | | 1 |
| (Austria) Wimmer Werk Motorsport | CUPRA León TCR | 24 | (Austria) Felix Wimmer | | 1−5 |
| (Austria) Wimmer Werk Motorsport | CUPRA León TCR | 55 | (Austria) Peter Gross | DSG; AM | 1−6 |
| (Austria) Wimmer Werk Motorsport | CUPRA León TCR | 56 | (Austria) Günter Benninger | DSG; AM | 1−6 |
| (Austria) Wimmer Werk Motorsport | CUPRA León TCR | 99 | (Austria) Christian Voithofer | DSG | 1−6 |
| (Italy) B.D. Racing | CUPRA León TCR | 28 | (Italy) Simone Vullo Jody | DSG | 7 |
| (Italy) Pit Lane Competizioni | Volkswagen Golf GTI TCR | 39 | (Italy) Claudio Formenti | DSG | 6−7 |
| (Italy) Pit Lane Competizioni | Audi RS 3 LMS TCR | 69 | (Italy) Enrico Bettera | | All |
| (Italy) Pit Lane Competizioni | CUPRA León TCR | 77 | (Italy) Raffaele Lissignoli | | 5 |
| (Italy) Proteam Motorsport | Volkswagen Golf GTI TCR | 64 | (Italy) Massimiliano Milli | DSG | 2−4 |
| (Italy) Proteam Motorsport | Volkswagen Golf GTI TCR | 64 | (Italy) Massimiliano Chini | DSG | 2−3 |
| (Italy) Proteam Motorsport | Volkswagen Golf GTI TCR | 64 | (Italy) Giovanni Altoe | DSG | 4 |
| (Italy) Target Competition | Hyundai i30 N TCR | 67 | (Italy) Marco Pellegrini | | All |
| (Italy) BF Motorsports | Audi RS 3 LMS TCR | 71 | (Italy) Jacopo Guidetti | U25 | All |
| (Italy) BF Motorsports | CUPRA León TCR | 72 | (Italy) Matteo Bergonzini | DSG | 1−5 |
| (Italy) Trico WRT | Hyundai i30 N TCR | 81 | (Italy) Damiano Reduzzi | | 3−4, 7 |
| (Italy) PMA Motorsport | Hyundai i30 N TCR | 95 | (Italy) Felice Jelmini | | 7 |

| Icon | Class |
|---|---|
| DSG | DSG Challenge |
| AM | Amateur |
| U25 | Under 25 |

== Calendar and results ==
The 2019 calendar was announced on 4 December 2018, with all rounds held in Italy.

| Rnd. | | Circuit | Date | Pole position | Fastest lap | Winning driver | Winning team | DSG Winner | Supporting |
|---|---|---|---|---|---|---|---|---|---|
| 1 | 1 | Autodromo Nazionale Monza, Monza | 6 April | (Italy) Enrico Bettera | (Italy) Jacopo Guidetti | (Russia) Klim Gavrilov | (Russia) LTA Rally | (Italy) Matteo Bergonzini | Italian GT Championship; TCR DSG Endurance |
| 1 | 2 | Autodromo Nazionale Monza, Monza | 7 April | | (Italy) Enrico Bettera | (Italy) Enrico Bettera | (Italy) Pit Lane Competizioni | (Italy) Matteo Bergonzini | Italian GT Championship; TCR DSG Endurance |
| 2 | 3 | Misano World Circuit Marco Simoncelli, Misano Adriatico | 18 May | (Italy) Enrico Bettera | (North Macedonia) Igor Stefanovski | (Italy) Marco Pellegrini | (Italy) Target Competition | (Italy) Eric Scalvini | |
| 2 | 4 | Misano World Circuit Marco Simoncelli, Misano Adriatico | 19 May | | (Italy) Eric Scalvini | (Italy) Matteo Greco | (Italy) Scuderia del Girasole Cupra Racing | (Italy) Eric Scalvini | |
| 3 | 5 | Autodromo Enzo e Dino Ferrari, Imola | 21–23 June | (Italy) Matteo Greco | (Italy) Enrico Bettera | (Italy) Salvatore Tavano | (Italy) Scuderia del Girasole Cupra Racing | (Italy) Eric Scalvini | |
| 3 | 6 | Autodromo Enzo e Dino Ferrari, Imola | 21–23 June | | (Italy) Marco Pellegrini | (Italy) Salvatore Tavano | (Italy) Scuderia del Girasole Cupra Racing | (Italy) Matteo Bergonzini | |
| 4 | 7 | Mugello Circuit, Scarperia | 19–21 July | (Russia) Klim Gavrilov | (Italy) Enrico Bettera | (Italy) Marco Pellegrini | (Italy) Target Competition | (Italy) Eric Scalvini | |
| 4 | 8 | Mugello Circuit, Scarperia | 19–21 July | | (Italy) Marco Pellegrini | (Austria) Felix Wimmer | (Austria) Wimmer Werk Motorsport | (Italy) Eric Scalvini | |
| 5 | 9 | Autodromo Enzo e Dino Ferrari, Imola | 31 August– 1 September | (Italy) Enrico Bettera | (Italy) Matteo Greco | (Italy) Enrico Bettera | (Italy) Pit Lane Competizioni | (Italy) Eric Scalvini | |
| 5 | 10 | Autodromo Enzo e Dino Ferrari, Imola | 31 August– 1 September | | (Italy) Jacopo Guidetti | (Italy) Salvatore Tavano | (Italy) Scuderia del Girasole Cupra Racing | (Italy) Eric Scalvini | |
| 6 | 11 | ACI Vallelunga Circuit, Campagnano di Roma | 13–15 September | (Italy) Marco Pellegrini | (Italy) Enrico Bettera | (Italy) Massimiliano Mugelli | (Italy) PRS Motorsport | (Italy) Eric Scalvini | |
| 6 | 12 | ACI Vallelunga Circuit, Campagnano di Roma | 13–15 September | | (Italy) Marco Pellegrini | (Italy) Salvatore Tavano | (Italy) Scuderia del Girasole Cupra Racing | (Italy) Eric Scalvini | |
| 7 | 13 | Autodromo Nazionale Monza, Monza | 4–6 October | (Italy) Marco Pellegrini | (Italy) Marco Pellegrini | (Italy) Marco Pellegrini | (Italy) Target Competition | (Italy) Nicola Guida | |
| 7 | 24 | Autodromo Nazionale Monza, Monza | 4–6 October | | (Italy) Jacopo Guidetti | (Italy) Matteo Greco | (Italy) Scuderia del Girasole Cupra Racing | (Italy) Eric Scalvini | |

=== Drivers' Championship ===
| Pos. | Driver | MNZ (Italy) | | MIS (Italy) | | IMO (Italy) | | MUG (Italy) | | IMO (Italy) | | VAL (Italy) | | MNZ (Italy) | | Pts. |
|---|---|---|---|---|---|---|---|---|---|---|---|---|---|---|---|---|
| 1 | (Italy) Salvatore Tavano | 2 | 2 | 13† | NC | 1 | 1 | 2 | 3 | 2 | 1 | 5 | 1 | 10 | 14 | 160 |
| 2 | (Italy) Matteo Greco | 3 | Ret | 9 | 1 | **2** | 3 | 3 | 4 | 5 | 10 | 2 | 5 | 4 | 1 | 141 |
| 3 | (Italy) Enrico Bettera | **Ret** | 1 | **2** | 6 | 14† | 2 | **7** | 16† | **1** | 6 | 4 | 3 | 2 | 4 | 135 |
| 4 | (Italy) Marco Pellegrini | 9 | 4 | 1 | 5 | 3 | 5 | 1 | 2 | 11† | 8 | **11†** | Ret | **1** | 8 | 127 |
| 5 | (Italy) Eric Scalvini | DNS | DNS | 3 | 2 | 4 | 14 | 6 | 5 | 6 | 5 | 6 | 2 | 7 | 3 | 96 |
| 6 | (Italy) Jacopo Guidetti | 4 | 3 | Ret | Ret | 5 | 9 | 4 | 12 | Ret | 3 | 3 | 4 | 3 | 2 | 86 |
| 7 | (Austria) Felix Wimmer | 5 | 11 | 6 | 4 | 9 | 15† | 5 | 1 | 4 | Ret | | | | | 57 |
| 8 | (Italy) Massimiliano Mugelli | 13† | 10 | 14† | 3 | Ret | 6 | 9 | Ret | Ret | 4 | 1 | Ret | Ret | DNS | 49 |
| 9 | (Italy) Matteo Bergonzini | 7 | 5 | 5 | 10 | 6 | 7 | Ret | 8 | 7 | 9 | | | | | 38 |
| 10 | (North Macedonia) Igor Stefanovski | | | 4 | Ret | 10 | 12 | | | 3 | 2 | | | | | 36 |
| 11 | (Italy) Davide Nardilli | 6 | 7 | 8 | 8 | 7 | 4 | Ret | Ret | | | | | | | 28 |
| 12 | (Russia) Klim Gavrilov | 1 | Ret | | | | | 13 | 14† | | | | | | | 21 |
| 13 | (Austria) Peter Gross | DNS | DNS | 7 | 9 | Ret | 8 | 14† | 10 | 10 | 13† | 8 | 6 | | | 18 |
| 14 | (Italy) Andrea Argenti | 8 | 6 | Ret | 7 | | | | | | | 7 | NP | | | 16 |
| 15 | (Italy) Damiano Reduzzi | | | | | 8 | 11 | Ret | 7 | | | | | Ret | 5 | 14 |
| 16 | (Austria) Günter Benninger | 10 | 8 | 11 | 11 | 12 | Ret | 15† | 11 | 8 | 11 | 10 | 8 | | | 11 |
| 17 | (Serbia) Nikola Miljković | | | | | | | | | | | | | 6 | 7 | 9 |
| 18 | (Russia) Denis Grigoriev | | | | | | | 8 | 6 | | | | | | | 8 |
| 19 | (Italy) Claudio Formenti | | | | | | | | | | | 9 | 7 | 9 | 11 | 8 |
| 20 | (Italy) Nicola Guida | | | | | | | | | | | | | 5 | 13 | 7 |
| 21 | (Italy) Felice Jelmini | | | | | | | | | | | | | Ret | 6 | 5 |
| 22 | (Italy) Jody Vullo | | | | | | | | | | | | | 8 | 9 | 5 |
| 23 | (Italy) Raffaele Lissignoli | | | | | | | | | Ret | 7 | | | | | 4 |
| 24 | (Italy) Massimiliano Milli | | | 10 | 13† | 11 | 10 | 11 | 9 | | | | | | | 4 |
| 25 | (Austria) Christian Voithöfer | 12 | 9 | 12 | 12 | 13 | 13 | 12 | 13 | 9 | 12 | 12† | Ret | | | 2 |
| 26 | (Italy) Giovanni Altoè | | | | | | | 9 | 11 | | | | | | | 2 |
| 27 | (Italy) Massimiliano Chini | | | 10 | 13† | 11 | 10 | | | | | | | | | 2 |
| 28 | (Russia) Lev Tolkačev | 11 | 12 | | | | | | | | | | | 11 | 10 | 1 |
| 29 | (Italy) Kevin Giacon | | | | | | | 10 | 15† | | | | | | | 1 |
| 30 | (Italy) Sandro Pelatti | | | | | | | | | | | | | Ret | 12 | 0 |
| | (Switzerland) Stefano Comini | | | | | | | | | Ret | DNS | | | | | 0 |
| | (Italy) Luca Segù | | | | | | | | | Ret | DNS | | | | | 0 |
| | (Italy) Nello Nataloni | DNS | DNS | DNS | DNS | | | | | | | | | | | 0 |
| Pos. | Driver | MNZ (Italy) | | MIS (Italy) | | IMO (Italy) | | MUG (Italy) | | IMO (Italy) | | VAL (Italy) | | MNZ (Italy) | | Pts. |

| Colour | Result |
|---|---|
| Gold | Winner |
| Silver | Second place |
| Bronze | Third place |
| Green | Points classification |
| Blue | Non-points classification |
| Blue | Non-classified finish (NC) |
| Purple | Retired, not classified (Ret) |
| Red | Did not qualify (DNQ) |
| Red | Did not pre-qualify (DNPQ) |
| Black | Disqualified (DSQ) |
| White | Did not start (DNS) |
| White | Withdrew (WD) |
| White | Race cancelled (C) |
| Blank | Did not practice (DNP) |
| Blank | Did not arrive (DNA) |
| Blank | Excluded (EX) |

**Bold** – Pole
Italics – Fastest Lap
