= 2018 TCR Italy Touring Car Championship =

Motor race competition

The 2018 TCR Italy Touring Car Championship was the fourth season of the ITCC to run under TCR regulations and the 32nd season since the national touring car series was revived in 1987 as the Campionato Italiano Turismo. The series began at the Autodromo Enzo e Dino Ferrari in April and concluded at the Autodromo Nazionale Monza in October.

== Teams and drivers ==
Team	Car	No.	Drivers	Class	Rounds
South Italy Racing Team	Opel Astra TCR	2	(Italy) Andrea Argenti		1, 3–7
South Italy Racing Team	Opel Astra TCR	18	(Italy) Nello Nataloni		4–6
(Estonia) MM Motorsport	Honda Civic Type R TCR (FK8)	3	(Italy) Massimiliano Mugelli		1–6
(Estonia) MM Motorsport	Honda Civic Type R TCR (FK8)	24	(Italy) Lorenzo Nicoli		7
(Estonia) MM Motorsport	Honda Civic Type R TCR (FK2)	24	(Italy) Lorenzo Nicoli		1–4
(Estonia) MM Motorsport	Honda Civic Type R TCR (FK2)	46	(Italy) Davide Nardilli		1, 3
(Estonia) MM Motorsport	Honda Civic Type R TCR (FK2)	77	(Russia) Denis Grigoriev		4
(Estonia) MM Motorsport	Honda Civic Type R TCR (FK2)	93	(Italy) Mauro Guastamacchia		5, 7
(Italy) SEAT Motorsport Italia	CUPRA León TCR	4	(Italy) Salvatore Tavano		All
(Italy) SEAT Motorsport Italia	CUPRA León TCR	4	(Italy) Matteo Greco	U25	1–3
(Italy) SEAT Motorsport Italia	CUPRA León TCR	34	(Italy) Matteo Greco		4–7
(Italy) SEAT Motorsport Italia	CUPRA León TCR	7	(Italy) Massimiliano Gagliano	DSG	All
(Italy) Nannini Racing	Honda Civic Type R TCR (FK2)	5	(Italy) Walter Margelli		1, 3–4
(Hungary) M1RA	Hyundai i30 N TCR	8	(Italy) Nicola Baldan		6
(Italy) Pit Lane Competizioni	Hyundai i30 N TCR	8	(Italy) Nicola Baldan		1–5
(Italy) Pit Lane Competizioni	Audi RS 3 LMS TCR	9	(Italy) Ermanno Dionisio	DSG; AM	1–3, 7
(Italy) Pit Lane Competizioni	Audi RS 3 LMS TCR	63	(Italy) Giovanni Altoè	DSG; U25	1–4, 6
(Italy) Pit Lane Competizioni	Audi RS 3 LMS TCR	69	(Italy) Enrico Bettera		All
(Italy) Pit Lane Competizioni	CUPRA León TCR	99	(Italy) Andrea Larini		All
(Italy) BRC Racing Team	Hyundai i30 N TCR	10	(Italy) Federico Paolino		All
(Italy) BRC Racing Team	Hyundai i30 N TCR	19	(Italy) Eric Scalvini	U25	All
(Italy) Target Competition	Honda Civic Type R TCR (FK2)	11	(Austria) Jürgen Schmarl		1–5, 7
(Italy) Target Competition	Honda Civic Type R TCR (FK2)	27	(Portugal) José Rodrigues		1–5
(Italy) Target Competition	Honda Civic Type R TCR (FK2)	27	(Portugal) César Machado		4–6
(Italy) Target Competition	Honda Civic Type R TCR (FK2)	67	(Italy) Marco Pellegrini		1–5, 7
(Italy) Target Competition	Hyundai i30 N TCR	67	(Italy) Marco Pellegrini		6
(Germany) Toksport WRT	SEAT León TCR	12	(Turkey) Çelik Çağlayan		2
(Italy) B.D. Racing	CUPRA León TCR	14	(Switzerland) Franco Nespoli	DSG	3
(Italy) B.D. Racing	SEAT León TCR	14	(Switzerland) Franco Nespoli	DSG	3
(Italy) B.D. Racing	SEAT León TCR	64	(Italy) Gabriele Volpato	DSG; U25	1
(Italy) B.D. Racing	SEAT León TCR	64	(Italy) Cosimo Papi	DSG; U25	1, 3
(Italy) B.D. Racing	CUPRA León TCR	64	(Italy) Cosimo Papi		4
(Italy) B.D. Racing	CUPRA León TCR	64	(Italy) Massimiliano Danetti		4
(Switzerland) Race Republic	CUPRA León TCR	15	(Switzerland) Jörg Schori		7
(Italy) BF Motorsport	SEAT León TCR	16	(Italy) Giuseppe Montalbano	DSG	3
(Italy) BF Motorsport	SEAT León TCR	22	(Italy) Daniele Verrocchio		5
(Italy) BF Motorsport	SEAT León TCR	22	(Italy) Romy Dall'Antonia		5
(Italy) BF Motorsport	SEAT León TCR	23	(Italy) Alessandro Thellung	DSG; U25	1–4
(Italy) BF Motorsport	CUPRA León TCR	23	(Italy) Alessandro Thellung	DSG; U25	6–7
(Italy) BF Motorsport	CUPRA León TCR	61	(Italy) Daniele Verrocchio		6
(Italy) BF Motorsport	CUPRA León TCR	61	(Italy) Andrea Mosca		6
(Italy) BF Motorsport	SEAT León TCR	72	(Italy) Matteo Bergonzini	DSG; AM	1, 3
(Italy) Sport & Comunicazione	Peugeot 308 Racing Cup	25	(Switzerland) Raimondo Ricci	AM	1, 3
(Italy) Sport & Comunicazione	Peugeot 308 Racing Cup	25	(Italy) Adriano Bernazzani		1, 3
(Italy) Otto Motorsport	Alfa Romeo Giulietta TCR	25	(Italy) Adriano Bernazzani		5, 7
(Italy) Otto Motorsport	Alfa Romeo Giulietta TCR	53	(Italy) Edoardo Cappello		3–5, 7
(Italy) GretaRacing Motorsport	CUPRA León TCR	26	(Italy) Piergiorgio Capra		6
(Italy) GretaRacing Motorsport	CUPRA León TCR	26	(Italy) Francesco Savoia	DSG; AM	6–7
(Italy) GretaRacing Motorsport	SEAT León TCR	26	(Italy) Francesco Savoia	DSG; AM	1, 3–5
(Italy) GretaRacing Motorsport	SEAT León TCR	26	(Italy) Vito Tagliente		3
(Italy) GretaRacing Motorsport	SEAT León TCR	26	(Italy) Daniele Verrocchio		4
(Italy) Team Mulsanne	Alfa Romeo Giulietta TCR	31	(Italy) Kevin Ceccon		6
(North Macedonia) LPR Stefanovski Racing Team	CUPRA León TCR	32	(North Macedonia) Igor Stefanovski		7
(Switzerland) 42 Racing SA (Italy) V-Action Racing	Alfa Romeo Giulietta TCR	42	(Italy) Luigi Ferrara		All
(Bulgaria) Kraf Racing	Audi RS 3 LMS TCR	44	(Bulgaria) Plamen Kralev		1, 3
(Italy) Top Run Motorsport	Subaru WRX STI TCR	50	(Italy) Luca Rangoni		5
(Austria) Wimmer Werk Motorsport	CUPRA León TCR	54	(Austria) Felix Wimmer	DSG	3, 5
(Austria) Wimmer Werk Motorsport	CUPRA León TCR	55	(Austria) Peter Gross	DSG; AM	1–4, 6
(Austria) Wimmer Werk Motorsport	CUPRA León TCR	56	(Austria) Günter Benninger	DSG; AM	1–6
(Italy) CRC - Cappellari Reparto Corse	Volkswagen Golf GTI TCR	76	(Italy) Daniele Cappellari	DSG	3, 5

Icon	Class
DSG	DSG Challenge
AM	Amateur
U25	Under 25

== Calendar and results ==
The 2018 calendar was announced on 26 October 2017, with a single round scheduled to be held in France as the only round held outside Italy.

Rnd.		Circuit	Date	Pole position	Fastest lap	Winning driver	Winning team	Supporting
1	1	(Italy) Autodromo Enzo e Dino Ferrari, Imola	29 April	(Italy) Eric Scalvini	(Italy) Luigi Ferrara	(Italy) Luigi Ferrara	(Switzerland) 42 Racing SA (Italy) V-Action Racing	Italian GT Championship; Italian Formula 4 Championship
1	2	(Italy) Autodromo Enzo e Dino Ferrari, Imola	29 April		(Italy) Nicola Baldan	(Italy) Luigi Ferrara	(Switzerland) 42 Racing SA (Italy) V-Action Racing	Italian GT Championship; Italian Formula 4 Championship
2	3	(France) Circuit Paul Ricard, Le Castellet	13 May	(Italy) Nicola Baldan	(Italy) Nicola Baldan	(Italy) Nicola Baldan	(Italy) Pit Lane Competizioni	Italian GT Championship; Italian Formula 4 Championship
2	4	(France) Circuit Paul Ricard, Le Castellet	14 May		(Italy) Ermanno Dionisio	(Italy) Andrea Larini	(Italy) Pit Lane Competizioni	Italian GT Championship; Italian Formula 4 Championship
3	5	(Italy) Misano World Circuit Marco Simoncelli, Misano Adriatico	16 June	(Italy) Luigi Ferrara	(Italy) Salvatore Tavano	(Italy) Luigi Ferrara	(Switzerland) 42 Racing SA (Italy) V-Action Racing	
3	6	(Italy) Misano World Circuit Marco Simoncelli, Misano Adriatico	17 June		(Italy) Nicola Baldan	(Austria) Jurgen Schmarl	(Italy) Target Competition	
4	7	(Italy) Mugello Circuit, Scarperia	15 July	(Italy) Salvatore Tavano	(Italy) Luigi Ferrara	(Italy) Salvatore Tavano	(Italy) SEAT Motorsport Italia	Italian GT Championship; Italian Formula 4 Championship
4	8	(Italy) Mugello Circuit, Scarperia	15 July		(Italy) Matteo Greco	(Italy) Edoardo Cappello	(Italy) Otto Motorsport	Italian GT Championship; Italian Formula 4 Championship
5	9	(Italy) Autodromo Enzo e Dino Ferrari, Imola	29 July	(Italy) Enrico Bettera	(Italy) Enrico Bettera	(Italy) Enrico Bettera	(Italy) Pit Lane Competizioni	Italian GT Championship; Italian Formula 4 Championship
5	10	(Italy) Autodromo Enzo e Dino Ferrari, Imola	29 July		(Italy) Enrico Bettera	(Italy) Salvatore Tavano	(Italy) SEAT Motorsport Italia	Italian GT Championship; Italian Formula 4 Championship
6	11	(Italy) ACI Vallelunga Circuit, Campagnano di Roma	16 September	(Portugal) César Machado	(Portugal) César Machado	(Portugal) César Machado	(Italy) Target Competition	Italian Formula 4 Championship
6	12	(Italy) ACI Vallelunga Circuit, Campagnano di Roma	16 September		(Italy) Salvatore Tavano	(Italy) Salvatore Tavano	(Italy) SEAT Motorsport Italia	Italian Formula 4 Championship
7	13	(Italy) Autodromo Nazionale Monza, Monza	7 October	(North Macedonia) Igor Stefanovski	(Italy) Eric Scalvini	(Italy) Luigi Ferrara	(Switzerland) 42 Racing SA (Italy) V-Action Racing	Italian GT Championship; Italian Formula 4 Championship
7	14	(Italy) Autodromo Nazionale Monza, Monza	7 October		(Italy) Salvatore Tavano	(Italy) Luigi Ferrara	(Switzerland) 42 Racing SA (Italy) V-Action Racing	Italian GT Championship; Italian Formula 4 Championship

=== TCR Italy Drivers' Standings ===
Pos.	Driver	(Italy) IMO		(France) LCA†		(Italy) MIS		(Italy) MUG		(Italy) IMO		(Italy) VAL		(Italy) MNZ		Pts.
Pos.	Driver	RD1	RD2	RD1	RD2	RD1	RD2	RD1	RD2	RD1	RD2	RD1	RD2	RD1	RD2	Pts.
1	(Italy) Salvatore Tavano	2		3		2		**1**	3	3	1	7	1	5	12	150.5
2	(Italy) Luigi Ferrara	1	1	Ret	16	**1**	2	22†	13	16	15	2	2	1	1	148
3	(Italy) Matteo Greco		4		6		19	5	4	6	3	12	5	8	3	108.5
4	(Italy) Enrico Bettera	3	2	Ret	19	10	DNS	14	6	**1**	6	5	16†	3	Ret	80
5	(Italy) Nicola Baldan	15	5	**1**	8	Ret	9	2	2	DNS	DNS	6	15†			69.5
6	(Italy) Eric Scalvini	**20**	23†	2	7	4	10	3	9	EX	EX	3	12	2	15	69
7	(Italy) Andrea Larini	5	3	8	1	8	15	Ret	15	7	4	13	6	4	6	65
8	(Austria) Jürgen Schmarl	7	14	5	4	6	1	10	10	5	7	DNS	DNS	9	Ret	55
9	(Italy) Massimiliano Mugelli	10	8	Ret	18	5	3	21†	16	2	17	8	Ret			41
10	(Italy) Edoardo Cappello					14	5	7	1	Ret	18			15	5	38
11	(Italy) Lorenzo Nicoli	6	18	Ret	17	9	4	11	11					6	2	35
12	(Italy) Federico Paolino	16	11	7	2	Ret	12	8	7	Ret	9	9	3	17	Ret	34.5
13	(Italy) Marco Pellegrini	Ret	10	4	5	7	Ret	4	5	Ret	Ret	Ret	14	11	Ret	31.5
14	(Portugal) José Rodrigues	4	6	6	3	15	DNS	6	Ret	Ret	13					29
15	(Italy) Massimiliano Gagliano	11	22	10	10	23	DNS	Ret	12	9	5	14	7	10	4	23.5
16	(Italy) Luca Rangoni									4	2					23
17	(Italy) Giovanni Altoè	8	7	9	9	20	7	12	14			10	4			23
18	(Portugal) Cesar Machado							6	Ret	Ret	13	**1**	17†			22
19	(Bulgaria) Plamen Kralev	19	9			3	Ret									14
20	(Italy) Francesco Savoia	9	12			17	21	16	19	8	8	17	10	16	11	9
21	(Italy) Kevin Ceccon											4	Ret			8
22	(Italy) Andrea Argenti	21	24†			28†	DNS	9	8	17	Ret	16	Ret	Ret	9	7
23	(North Macedonia) Igor Stefanovski													**7**	10	6
24	(Italy) Giuseppe Montalbano					11	6									5
25	(Italy) Alessandro Thellung	Ret	Ret	Ret	15	13	DNS	15	Ret			11	13	13	7	4
26	(Italy) Mauro Guastamacchia									12	10			12	8	4
27	(Austria) Peter Gross	Ret	17	12	12	21	17	20†	21			Ret	8			3
28	(Italy) Matteo Bergonzini	13	15			12	8									3
29	(Italy) Daniele Verrocchio							16	19	10	11	15	9			3
30	(Italy) Andrea Mosca											15	9			3
31	(Italy) Romy Dall'Antonia									10	11					1
32	(Italy) Pierpaolo Capra											17	10			1
33	(Italy) Ermanno Dionisio	12	13	11	11	16	DNS							14	13	0
34	(Italy) Daniele Cappelari					25	14			11	12					0
35	(Austria) Günter Benninger	15	21	13	13	27	20	19†	22	15	14	19†	11			0
36	(Italy) Cosimo Papi	18	20			18	11	13	20							0
37	(Austria) Felix Wimmer							Ret	18	13	16					0
38	(Italy) Walter Margelli	Ret	DNS			24	13	17	18							0
39	(Italy) Massimiliano Danetti							13	20							0
40	(Italy) Adriano Bernazzani	14	19			19	DNS			14	Ret			Ret	14	0
41	(Turkey) Çağlayan Çelik			14	14											0
42	(Switzerland) Raimondo Ricci		19			19										0
43	(Switzerland) Franco Nespoli					22	16									0
44	(Italy) Davide Nardilli	Ret	16			26	DNS									0
45	(Russia) Denis Grigorev							18	17							0
46	(Italy) Vito Tagliente					17	21									0
47	(Italy) Gabriele Volpato	18	20													0
48	(Italy) Nello Nataloni							DNS	DNS	DNS		18	Ret			0
	(Switzerland) Jörg Schori													Ret	Ret	0

Colour	Result
Gold	Winner
Silver	Second place
Bronze	Third place
Green	Points classification
Blue	Non-points classification
Blue	Non-classified finish (NC)
Purple	Retired, not classified (Ret)
Red	Did not qualify (DNQ)
Red	Did not pre-qualify (DNPQ)
Black	Disqualified (DSQ)
White	Did not start (DNS)
White	Withdrew (WD)
White	Race cancelled (C)
Blank	Did not practice (DNP)
Blank	Did not arrive (DNA)
Blank	Excluded (EX)

**Bold** – Pole
Italics – Fastest Lap

† – Drivers did not finish the race, but were classified as they completed over 75% of the race distance.
