= Nicola Baldan =

Italian racing driver (born 1982)

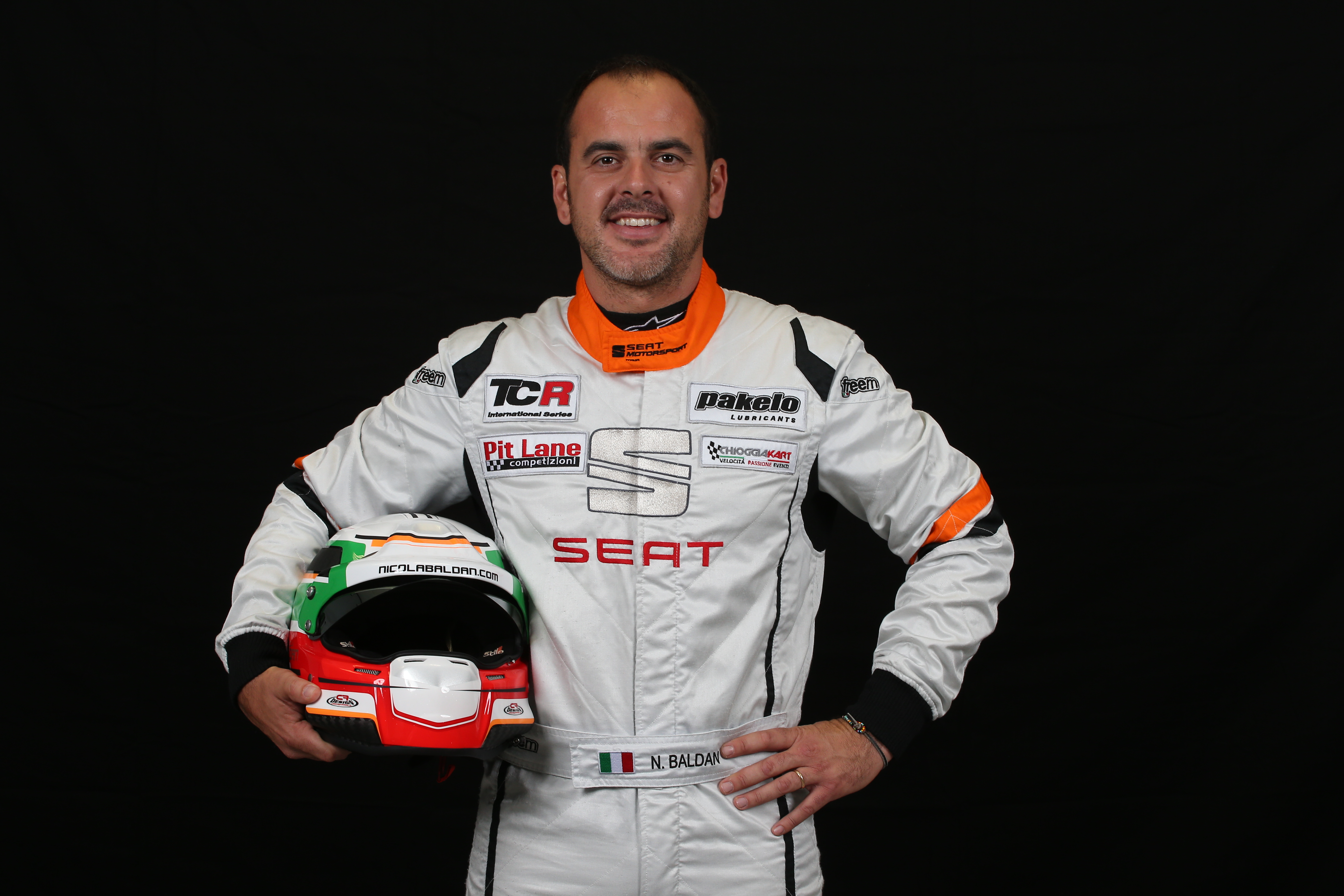
- Baldan in 2017
- Nationality: (Italy) Italian
- Born: 30 May 1982 (age 44) Piove di Sacco, Italy
- Categorisation: FIA Silver

Championship titles
- 2017 2016 2013 2010: TCR Italy Touring Car Championship; SEAT León Cup Italy; MINI Challenge Italy; Trofeo Abarth Italia

Nicola Baldan (born 30 May 1982) is an Italian racing driver who last competed in the TCR Europe Touring Car Series for PMA Motorsport.

== Career ==
Baldan began car racing in 2002, competing in the Citroen Saxo Cup. After winning the Under-25 title in 2003, Baldan then transitioned to Renault Clio Cup Italia, winning the junior title in 2006 and 2007 before finishing third overall in 2008. The following year, Baldan transitioned to the Abarth 500 trophy, competing in the series until 2012, most notably winning the Italian and European titles in 2010. Baldan then won the 2013 MINI Challenge Italy title, before joining Roma Racing Team for his only season in the Euro V8 Series, taking a lone win at Mugello and five more podiums to secure third in points.

Following that, Baldan spent two years in SEAT León Cup Italy, in which he most notably secured the overall title in 2016 driving for Pit Lane Competizioni. Returning to Pit Lane Competizioni for 2017, Baldan transitioned over to TCR Italy for his second season with the team. Starting off the season with wins at Misano, Monza and Mugello, before scoring a win in each of the three remaining rounds to secure the TCR Italy title. For his title defense the following year, Baldan remained with Pit Lane Competizioni, Baldan took a lone win at Le Castellet and two other podiums before leaving the team with two rounds to go, and ending the year with M1RA. During 2018, Baldan also raced for both teams in select rounds of TCR Europe.

The following year, Baldan moved to GT3 competition by racing in the Italian GT Sprint Championship for Antonelli Motorsport. In his only full-time season in the series, Baldan scored a lone podium in the season-ending race at Monza. Baldan then switched to Dinamic Motorsport to compete in Porsche Carrera Cup Italy in 2020, scoring a lone podium at Mugello as he ended the year eighth in points. During 2020, Baldan also joined Élite Motorsport to make one-off appearances in TCR Europe, TCR Italy and TCR Ibérico. Returning to TCR competition full-time in 2021, Baldan joined Target Competition to compete in TCR Italy, as well as select rounds of the World Touring Car Cup. In his first full season since 2017, Baldan scored podiums in both races at the Misano and Imola rounds en route to a fourth-place points finish.

Switching to TCR Europe full-time for 2022, Baldan joined Hyundai N Team Target, scoring podiums at Algarve and Nürburgring to end the year seventh in points. During 2022, Baldan also returned to TCR Italy, competing in the last two rounds for Élite Motorsport and scoring a lone podium in race one at Vallelunga. In 2023, Baldan joined Aggressive Team Italia for one-off appearances in TCR Europe and the TCR World Tour, before coming back to the former's last three rounds for Comtoyou Racing and scoring four podiums en route to seventh in points.

Returning to TCR Europe and Comtoyou Racing for 2024, Baldan took his maiden series win in race one at Zolder from pole as he ended the year eighth in points. In parallel, Baldan also raced in TCR Italy, taking wins at Pergusa and Imola en route to a third-place points finish. The following year, Baldan remained with Aikoa Racing for a dual campaign in both TCR Europe and TCR Italy. Scoring a best result of fourth twice and finishing 10th in the former's standings, Baldan found more success in the latter, taking wins at Misano and Monza and seven more podiums to secure runner-up honors in points.

Baldan switched to PMA Motorsport to continue competing in TCR Europe the following year. In his first season with the team, Baldan took a lone win at Le Castellet and took two other podiums to finish seventh overall.

== Racing record ==
=== Racing career summary ===
Season	Series	Team	Races	Wins	Poles	F/Laps	Podiums	Points	Position
2002	Citroen Saxo Cup								
2003	Citroen Saxo Cup								
2004	Renault Clio Cup Italia	Scuderia La Torre						22	16th
2005	Renault Clio Cup Italia	Scuderia La Torre						14	16th
2006	Renault Clio Cup Italia	Team Alghisi						110	5th
2007	Renault Clio Cup Italia	Team Alghisi	9	0	0	0	0	62	7th
2008	Renault Clio Cup Italia	Go Race	9	0	0	1	3	122	**3rd**
2009	Alpe Adria Clio Cup	Go Race	2	0	0	0	0	0	NC
2010	Trofeo Abarth Italia	Uboldi Corse	12	7	8	3	10	211	**1st**
2010	Trofeo Castrol SEAT Leon Supercopa	Drive Techonology	10	0	0	0	1	37	10th
2011	Italian GT Championship - GT4	Composit Moto	2	0	0	0	0	13	29th
2011	Ferrari Challenge Italy								
2012	Trofeo Abarth Italia							170	**2nd**
2012	Trofeo Abarth 500 Europe							65	5th
2012	Ginetta G50 Cup Italy		2	0	0	0	0	12	43rd
2013	MINI Challenge Italy	MINI Milano by Dinamic Promodrive	12	7	3	1	10	199	**1st**
2013	Campionato Italiano Superstars	Team BMW Dinamic	2	0	0	0	0	22	12th
2014	EuroV8 Series	Roma Racing Team	10	1	0	1	6	147	**3rd**
2016	SEAT León Eurocup	Pit Lane Competizioni	6	0	0	0	0	27	11th
2017	TCR Italy Touring Car Championship	Pit Lane Competizioni	14	7	8	5	11	210	**1st**
2018	TCR Italy Touring Car Championship	Pit Lane Competizioni	8	1	1	1	3	69.5	5th
2018	TCR Italy Touring Car Championship	M1RA	2	0	0	0	0	69.5	5th
2018	TCR Europe Touring Car Series	Pit Lane Competizioni	2	0	0	0	0	1	28th
2018	TCR Europe Touring Car Series	M1RA	2	0	0	0	0	1	28th
2018	TCR Swiss Trophy		2	0	0	1	0	10	28th
2019	Italian GT Sprint Championship – GT3	Antonelli Motorsport	8	0	0	0	1	30	9th
2019	TCR DSG Endurance	Pit Lane Competizioni	2	0	0	0	0	0	NC
2020	Porsche Carrera Cup Italy	Dinamic Motorsport	12	0	0	0	1	42	8th
2020	TCR Europe Touring Car Series	Élite Motorsport	2	0	0	0	0	28	23rd
2020	TCR Italy Touring Car Championship	Élite Motorsport	2	0	0	0	0	15	26th
2020	TCR Ibérico Touring Car Series	Élite Motorsport	2	0	0	0	1	28	8th
2021	TCR Italy Touring Car Championship	Target Competition	12	0	0	1	4	316	4th
2021	World Touring Car Cup	Target srl	4	0	0	0	0	0	23rd
2022	TCR Europe Touring Car Series	Hyundai N Team Target	13	0	0	0	2	245	7th
2022	TCR Italy Touring Car Championship	Élite Motorsport	4	0	0	0	1	98	NC
2023	TCR Europe Touring Car Series	Aggressive Team Italia	2	0	0	0	0	235	7th
2023	TCR Europe Touring Car Series	Comtoyou Racing	6	0	0	0	4	235	7th
2023	TCR World Tour	Aggressive Team Italia	2	0	0	0	0	1	57th
2023	24H TCE Series - TCR	Aikoa Racing	1	1	1	1	1	40	NC
2024	TCR Europe Touring Car Series	Gruppo Baldan by Comtoyou Racing	10	1	1	1	1	201	8th
2024	TCR Italy Touring Car Championship	Aikoa Racing	12	2	0	0	7	344	**3rd**
2025	TCR Europe Touring Car Series	Aikoa Racing	12	0	0	0	0	133	10th
2025	TCR Italy Touring Car Championship	Aikoa Racing	12	2	1	1	9	396	**2nd**
2026	TCR Europe Touring Car Series	PMA Motorsport	12	1	0	0	3	158	7th
2026	TCR Europe Cup	PMA Motorsport	1	0	0	0	0	12	12th

=== Complete EuroV8 Series results ===
(key) (Races in bold indicate pole position) (Races in italics indicate fastest lap)

Year	Team	Car	1	2	3	4	5	6	7	8	9	10	DC	Points
2014	Roma Racing Team	Mercedes C63 AMG Coupé	MNZ; 1; 2	MNZ; 2; 16†	**VAL**; **1**; 2	VAL; 2; 8†	MUG; 1; 1	MUG; 2; 2	BRN; 1; 3	BRN; 2; 2	SAC; 7	HOC; Ret	3rd	147

=== Complete TCR Italy Touring Car Championship results ===
(key) (Races in bold indicate pole position) (Races in italics indicate fastest lap)

Year	Team	Car	1	2	3	4	5	6	7	8	9	10	11	12	13	14	DC	Points
2017	Pit Lane Competizioni	SEAT León TCR	ADR; 1; 3	ADR; 2; 3	**MIS**; **1**; 1	**MIS**; **2** Ret	MNZ1; 1; 1	**MNZ1**; **2**; 1	**MUG**; **1**; 5	**MUG**; **2**; 1	**IMO**; **1**; 11	**IMO**; **2**; 1	**VAL**; **1**; 3	**VAL**; **2**; 1	MNZ2; 1; 2	**MNZ2**; **2**; 1	1st	210
2018	Pit Lane Competizioni	Hyundai i30 N TCR	IMO1; 1; 15	IMO1; 2; 5	**LEC**; **1**; 1	LEC; 2; 8	MIS; 1 Ret	MIS; 2; 9	MUG; 1; 2	MUG; 2; 2	IMO2; 1 DNS	IMO2; 2 DNS					5th	69.5
2018	M1RA	Hyundai i30 N TCR											VAL; 1; 6	VAL; 2; 15†	MNZ; 1	MNZ; 2	5th	69.5
2020	Élite Motorsport	CUPRA León Competición TCR	MUG; 1	MUG; 2	MIS; 1	MIS; 2	IMO1; 1	IMO1; 2	VAL; 1	VAL; 2	MNZ; 1	MNZ; 2	IMO2; 1; 15	IMO2; 2; 4			26th	15
2021	Target Competition	Hyundai i30 N TCR	MNZ; 1; 6^{10}	MNZ; 2; 6	MIS; 1; 3^{2}	MIS; 2; 2	VAL; 1; 5^{2}	VAL; 2; 5	IMO1; 1; 4	IMO1; 2; 5	IMO2; 1; 2	IMO2; 2; 2	MUG; 1; 5	MUG; 2 Ret			4th	316
2022	Élite Motorsport	Audi RS 3 LMS TCR (2021)	MNZ; 1	MNZ; 2	IMO1; 1	IMO1; 2	MIS; 1	MIS; 2	MUG; 1	MUG; 2	IMO2; 1; 7	IMO2; 2; 26†	VAL; 1; 2^{3}	VAL; 2; 4			NC	98
2024	Aikoa Racing	Audi RS 3 LMS TCR (2021)	MIS; 1; 20†^{4}	MIS; 2; 2	PER; 1; 1^{7}	PER; 2 Ret	MUG; 1; 2^{7}	MUG; 2; 2	IMO; 1; 7^{7}	IMO; 2; 1	VAL; 1; 2^{4}	VAL; 2; 3	MNZ; 1; 8^{6}	MNZ; 2; 21			3rd	344
2025	Aikoa Racing	Audi RS 3 LMS TCR (2021)	MIS1; 1; 4^{8}	MIS1; 2; 1	VAL; 1; 2^{2}	VAL; 2; 2	**MNZ**; **1**; 7^{1}	MNZ; 2; 1	IMO; 1; 7^{7}	IMO; 2; 2	MUG; 1; 3^{5}	MUG; 2; 3	MIS2; 1; 3^{9}	MIS2; 2; 3			2nd	396

=== Complete TCR Europe Touring Car Series results ===
(key) (Races in bold indicate pole position) (Races in italics indicate fastest lap)

Year	Team	Car	1	2	3	4	5	6	7	8	9	10	11	12	13	14	DC	Points
2018	Pit Lane Competizioni	Hyundai i30 N TCR	LEC; 1; 10	LEC; 2; 18†	ZAN; 1	ZAN; 2	SPA; 1	SPA; 2	HUN; 1	HUN; 2	ASS; 1	ASS; 2					28th	1
2018	M1RA	Hyundai i30 N TCR											MNZ; 1; 11	MNZ; 2; 17	CAT; 1	CAT; 2	28th	1
2020	Élite Motorsport	CUPRA León Competición TCR	LEC; 1	LEC; 2	ZOL; 1	ZOL; 2	MNZ; 1	MNZ; 2	CAT; 1	CAT; 2	SPA; 1; 9	SPA; 2; 8	JAR; 1	JAR; 2			23rd	28
2022	Target Competition	Hyundai Elantra N TCR	ALG; 1; 3	ALG; 2; 15	LEC; 1; 9	LEC; 2; 10	SPA; 1; 4	SPA; 2; 12	NOR; 1; 13	NOR; 2; 11	NÜR; 1; 2	NÜR; 2 C	MNZ; 1; 4	MNZ; 2; 4	CAT; 1; 7	CAT; 2; 8	7th	245
2023	Aggressive Team Italia	Hyundai Elantra N TCR	ALG; 1; 16	ALG; 2; 15	PAU; 1	PAU; 2	SPA; 1	SPA; 2	HUN; 1	HUN; 2							11th	104
2023	Comtoyou Racing	Audi RS 3 LMS TCR (2021)									LEC; 1; 2^{4}	LEC; 2; 2	MNZ; 1; 2^{3}	MNZ; 2; 2	CAT; 1; 4^{6}	CAT; 2; 5	11th	104
2024	Gruppo Baldan by Comtoyou Racing	Audi RS 3 LMS TCR (2021)	VAL; 1; 4^{2}	VAL; 2; 5	**ZOL**; **1**; 1^{1}	ZOL; 2; 7	SAL; 1; 12	SAL; 2; 6	SPA; 1; 6	SPA; 2; 4	BRN; 1	BRN; 2	CRT; 1; 15^{7}	CRT; 2 Ret			8th	201
2025	Aikoa Racing	Audi RS 3 LMS TCR (2021)	ALG; 1; 6	ALG; 2; 9	SPA; 1; 7	SPA; 2; 7	HOC; 1; 4^{2}	HOC; 2; 12	MIS; 1; 13	MIS; 2 Ret	RBR; 1; 4^{4}	RBR; 2; 6	CAT; 1; 19	CAT; 2; 13			10th	133
2026	PMA Motorsport	Audi RS 3 LMS TCR (2021)	MUG; 1; 6^{6}	MUG; 2; 5	SPA; 1; 8	SPA; 2; 7	LEC; 1; 1	LEC; 2; 3	HUN; 1; 11	HUN; 2 Ret	MNZ; 1 Ret^{5}	MNZ; 2; 2	CAT; 1; 10	CAT; 2 Ret			7th	158

^{†} Baldan did not finish the race, but was classified as he completed over 90% of the race distance.

=== Complete Porsche Carrera Cup Italy Results ===
(key) (Races in bold indicate pole position) (Races in italics indicate fastest lap)

Year	Entrant	1	2	3	4	5	6	7	8	9	10	11	12	Pos	Points
2020	Dinamic Motorsport	MUG1; 1; 10	MUG1; 2; 8	MIS; 1; 21	MIS; 2; 4	IMO1; 1; 7	IMO1; 2; 7	VLL; 1; 11	VLL; 2; 10	MUG2; 1; 2	MUG2; 2; 4	MNZ; 1; 25	MNZ; 2 DSQ	8th	42

=== Complete World Touring Car Cup results ===
(key) (Races in bold indicate pole position) (Races in italics indicate fastest lap)

Year	Team	Car	1	2	3	4	5	6	7	8	9	10	11	12	13	14	15	16	DC	Points
2021	Target srl	Hyundai Elantra N TCR	GER; 1	GER; 2	POR; 1	POR; 2	ESP; 1	ESP; 2	HUN; 1; 18	HUN; 2; 20	CZE; 1	CZE; 2	FRA; 1	FRA; 2	ITA; 1; 19	ITA; 2; 18	RUS; 1	RUS; 2	23rd	0

=== Complete TCR World Tour results ===
(key) (Races in bold indicate pole position) (Races in italics indicate fastest lap)

Year	Team	Car	1	2	3	4	5	6	7	8	9	10	11	12	13	14	15	16	17	18	19	20	DC	Points
2023	Aggressive Team Italia	Hyundai Elantra N TCR	ALG; 1; 16	ALG; 2; 15	SPA; 1	SPA; 2	VAL; 1	VAL; 2	HUN; 1	HUN; 2	ELP; 1	ELP; 2	VIL; 1	VIL; 2	SYD; 1	SYD; 2	SYD; 3	BAT; 1	BAT; 2	BAT; 3	MAC; 1	MAC; 2	57th	1
