= Arduini =

Arduini may refer to:

== People ==
- Federico Monti Arduini (born 1 December 1940), best known as Il Guardiano del Faro, Italian composer, producer and musician
- Massimo Arduini (born 1960), Italian auto racing driver
- Stefano Arduini (born 1956), Italian scholar of linguistics, rhetoric, semiotics and translation

== Other ==
- Neviano degli Arduini, comune (municipality) in the province of Parma in the Italian region Emilia-Romagna
