= 2017 TCR Trophy Europe =

European motorsport championship

Layout of the Adria International Raceway

The 2017 TCR Trophy Europe was the second holding of the TCR Trophy Europe, and the only one held as one-off event on 28–29 October in Adria International Raceway in Italy for drivers from the national and regional European TCR series.

== Teams and drivers ==
Team	Car	No.	Drivers	Class
(Finland) LMS Racing	SEAT León TCR	4	(Finland) Olli Parhankangas	
(Finland) LMS Racing	Audi RS3 LMS TCR	10	(Finland) Antti Buri	
(Italy) Tecnodom Sport	Opel Astra TCR	5	(Italy) Kevin Giacon	
(Belgium) DG Sport Compétition	Peugeot 308 Racing Cup	8	(France) Aurélien Comte	
(Germany) Liqui Moly Team Engstler	Volkswagen Golf GTI TCR	7	(Germany) Luca Engstler	
(Germany) Liqui Moly Team Engstler	Volkswagen Golf GTI TCR	39	(Switzerland) Florian Thoma	
(Portugal) Team Novadriver	Volkswagen Golf GTI TCR	11	(Portugal) Francisco Abreu	
(Russia) Innocenti-AMG Motorsport	SEAT León TCR	15	(Russia) Lev Tolkachev	DSG
(Russia) Innocenti-AMG Motorsport	SEAT León TCR	77	(Russia) Denis Grigoriev	DSG
(Italy) Target Competition	Honda Civic Type R TCR	21	(Italy) Giacomo Altoè	
(Italy) Target Competition	Honda Civic Type R TCR	99	(United Kingdom) Josh Files	
(Italy) V-Action Racing	Alfa Romeo Giulietta TCR	32	(Italy) Luigi Ferrara	
(Bulgaria) Kraf Racing	Audi RS3 LMS TCR	44	(Bulgaria) Plamen Kralev	
(Italy) CRC - Cappellari Reparto Corse	SEAT León TCR	76	(Italy) Daniele Cappellari	DSG
(Belgium) Team WRT	Volkswagen Golf GTI TCR	88	(Belgium) Maxime Potty	
Wildcards
Wildcards	Volkswagen Golf GTI TCR	52	(Italy) Giovanni Altoè	DSG
Wildcards	Volkswagen Golf GTI TCR	53	(Italy) Sandro Pelatti	DSG
Wildcards	Audi RS3 LMS TCR	54	(Italy) Ermanno Dionisio	DSG
Wildcards	Audi RS3 LMS TCR	55	(Italy) Giovanni Berton	DSG
Guest entries ineligible for points
(Italy) BRC Racing Team	Hyundai i30 N TCR	30	(Italy) Gabriele Tarquini	

Icon	Class
DSG	DSG Trophy

== Final standings ==
Pos	Driver	R1	R2	Pts
1	(France) Aurélien Comte	4	2	45
2	(Italy) Giacomo Altoè	3^{3}	3	45
3	(United Kingdom) Josh Files	1^{2}	7	43
4	(Belgium) Maxime Potty	6^{6}	4	31
5	(Switzerland) Florian Thoma	7	5	25
6	(Italy) Luigi Ferrara	9^{5}	6	20
7	(Finland) Antti Buri	5	Ret	17
8	(Germany) Luca Engstler	18^{4}	9	12
9	(Portugal) Francisco Abreu	16	8	11
10	(Italy) Giovanni Altoé	8	10	8
11	(Bulgaria) Plamen Kralev	12	17	5
12	(Russia) Lev Tolkachev	13	13	5
13	(Finland) Olli Kangas	14	15	5
14	(Russia) Denis Grigoriev	15	14	5
15	(Italy) Daniele Cappellari	17	16	5
16	(Italy) Kevin Giacon	DNS	DNS	5
17	(Italy) Sandro Pelatti	10	11	3
18	(Italy) Ermano Dionisio	11	12	1
	(Italy) Giovanni Berton	WD	WD	0
Entries ineligible for points
	(Italy) Gabriele Tarquini	**2^{1}**	1	

Colour	Result
Gold	Winner
Silver	Second place
Bronze	Third place
Green	Points classification
Blue	Non-points classification
Blue	Non-classified finish (NC)
Purple	Retired, not classified (Ret)
Red	Did not qualify (DNQ)
Red	Did not pre-qualify (DNPQ)
Black	Disqualified (DSQ)
White	Did not start (DNS)
White	Withdrew (WD)
White	Race cancelled (C)
Blank	Did not practice (DNP)
Blank	Did not arrive (DNA)
Blank	Excluded (EX)

**Bold** – Pole

Italics – Fastest Lap

=== Notes ===
- 14 drivers (Aurélien Comte, Giacomo Altoé, Josh Files, Maxime Potty, Florian Thoma, Antti Buri, Luca Engstler, Francisco Abreu, Plamen Kralev, Lev Tolkachev, Oli Kangas, Denis Grigoriev, Danielle Cappellari and Kevin Giacon) received 5 pre-qualifying points for competing in at least 5 rounds in either their national championships or in the European TCR International Series rounds. Luigi Ferrara was awarded 4 points.
- As the Hyundai i30 N TCR was with temporary homologation, Gabriele Tarquini was ineligible to score points and was considered transparent in the final standings

== Teams' Trophy ==
Pos	Team	R1	R2	Pts
1	(Italy) Target Competition	1	3	69
1	(Italy) Target Competition	3	7	69
2	(Belgium) DG Sport Compétition	4	2	40
3	(Belgium) Team WRT	6	4	27
4	(Germany) Liqui Moly Team Engstler	7	5	24
4	(Germany) Liqui Moly Team Engstler	18	9	24
5	(Italy) V-Action Racing	9	6	16
6	(Finland) LMS Racing	5	15	14
6	(Finland) LMS Racing	14	Ret	14
7	(Portugal) Team Novadriver	16	8	6
8	(Russia) Innocenti-AMG Motorsport	13	13	4
8	(Russia) Innocenti-AMG Motorsport	15	14	4
9	(Bulgaria) Kraf Racing	12	17	2
	(Italy) Tecnodom Sport	DNS	DNS	
	(Italy) CRC - Cappellari Reparto Corse	WD	WD	
Entries ineligible for points
	(Italy) BRC Racing Team	2	1	

Colour	Result
Gold	Winner
Silver	Second place
Bronze	Third place
Green	Points classification
Blue	Non-points classification
Blue	Non-classified finish (NC)
Purple	Retired, not classified (Ret)
Red	Did not qualify (DNQ)
Red	Did not pre-qualify (DNPQ)
Black	Disqualified (DSQ)
White	Did not start (DNS)
White	Withdrew (WD)
White	Race cancelled (C)
Blank	Did not practice (DNP)
Blank	Did not arrive (DNA)
Blank	Excluded (EX)
