= Plamen Kralev =

Bulgarian racing driver and businessman (born 1973)

- Nationality: (Bulgaria) Bulgarian
- Born: Plamen Simeonov Kralev; 22 February 1973 (age 53) Sofia, Bulgaria

Previous series
- 2007–08 2008 2008-09 2009 2009–10 2010–12 2014, 17 2017-18: Ferrari Challenge; FIA GT3 European Championship; ADAC GT Masters; International GT Open; 24 Hours of Le Mans; Le Mans Series; GP2 Asia Series; FIA Formula Two Championship; FIA ETCC; Italian Touring Car Championship

Plamen Simeonov Kralev (Bulgarian: Пламен Симеонов Кралев, born 22 February 1973 in Sofia) is a Bulgarian racing driver and businessman. He is the first Bulgarian driver to participate in FIA Formula Two Championship, and the only Bulgarian driver to compete in 24 Hours of Le Mans, Le Mans series, ADAC GT Masters, International GT Open, FIA European Touring Car Cup, Italian Touring Car Championship and Ferrari Challenge. Kralev also has participated in the FIA GT3 European Championship, and in the GP2 Asia Series. Kralev wraps up his active racing career in 2018 in the Italian Touring Car Championship with a podium finish at Misano.

== Biography ==
In 1999, Kralev graduated from the University of Architecture, Civil Engineering and Geodesy.

== Racing career ==
2003

Kralev debuted his racing career in 2003 in the Bulgarian Road Championship and became champion of class X3 in the same year. Simultaneously he also won the National Off-Road Championship in Bulgaria.

2007

Kralev began his international career in 2007 in the European Ferrari Challenge series, driving for Team Rosokorso. In his first season, Kralev recorded two wins: Hockenheimring and Mugello. At the end of the season, he was ranked 11th place with 112 points.

2008

In 2008, Kralev moved to Kessel Racing. He participated both in the Ferrari Challenge as well as in the FIA GT3 European Championship. Kralev was initially partnered with Dimitar Iliev and was later teamed with Niki Cadei. Kralev and Kessel Racing also participated in the German ADAC GT Masters series with their GT3 car. During 2008 Kralev recorded two wins in the Ferrari Challenge and was ranked fifth at the end of the season. Kralev ran as high as third on the Ferrari Challenge World Cup event near the end of the season but fell back due to tire problems. Kralev also participated in the final round of the International GT Open in Barcelona with Matteo Cressoni. The two earned tenth and fourth-place finishes in the two races. The success he achieved during these two years led him to pursue a professional racing career. On 8 September 2008, Kralev signed a cooperation agreement with the Bulgaria State Tourism Agency to serve as the country's ambassador to the world of motorsport. Kralev's GT3 Ferrari bears the Bulgarian rose as a tourism promotion.

2009

In 2009, Kralev became the first Bulgarian to participate in the 24 Hours of Le Mans endurance race driving the Endurance Asia Team Porsche, but due to a gear box failure, had to stop at the 18th hour with 186 laps completed. Kralev remains the only Bulgarian driver to have participated in the 24 Hours of Le Mans series to date. Later that year, he joined the GP2 Asia Series in the 2009–10 season with the Trident Racing team. Despite the lack of any experience in Formula racing, Kralev managed to meet the eligibility criteria and finished a full season.

2010-12

Next, Kralev moved to the FIA Formula Two Championship for the 2010 season, and continued in the series in 2011 and 2012. He remains the first Bulgarian driver to have ever competed in the Formula Two Championship.

At the end of the 2012 season, the Formula Two Championship had been disbanded and Kralev ended this stage of his racing career with it.

2014

Kralev partially competed in the European Touring Car Cup for Engstler Motorsport with BMW 320si, for three events and was ranked tenth place with 14 points.

2017

Kralev started racing in the FIA European Touring Car Cup (ETCC) and the TCR Italy Touring Car Championship (ITCC) for this 2017 seasons for Kraf Racing with AUDI RS3 LMS. Kraf Racing is a new Bulgarian team, and despite the lack of experience still manage to get six podiums – two in ETCC and four in TCR.

2018

Kralev continued racing only in the TCR Italy Touring Car Championship (ITCC) for the 2018 season because the FIA European Touring Car Cup (ETCC) had folded at the end of the 2017 season. Kralev missed the second racing weekend (Paul Ricard) of this season because his car was damaged from the first race in Imola and wasn't ready in time. He returned for the third racing weekend at Misano where there were a record number of 31 cars racing and yet Kralev still managed to get in third place on the first race but due to a collision he became ninth in the second race.

== Racing Record ==
=== Career Summary ===
Season	Series	Team	Races	Wins	Poles	F/Laps	Podiums	Points	Position
2007	Ferrari Challenge	Team Rossocorsa	15	2	2	?	2	112	11th
2008	FIA GT3 European Championship	Kessel Racing	7	0	0	0	0	0	NC
2008	ADAC GT Masters	Kessel Racing	2	0	0	1	1	10	22nd
2008	Ferrari Challenge Italy	Kessel Racing	8	3	4	?	5	175	5th
2008	International GT Open – GTA	Racing Team EdilCris	2	0	0	0	0	4	26th
2009	International GT Open	Vittoria Competizioni	6	0	0	0	0	7	43rd
2009	International GT Open – Super GT	Vittoria Competizioni	6	0	0	0	0	0	NC
2009	24 Hours of Le Mans – GT2	Endurance Asia Team	1	0	0	0	0	N/A	11th
2009	Le Mans Series – GT2	JMB Racing	1	0	0	0	0	0	NC
2009–10	GP2 Asia Series	Trident Racing	8	0	0	0	0	0	33rd
2010	FIA Formula Two Championship	MotorSport Vision	18	0	0	0	0	1	20th
2011	FIA Formula Two Championship	MotorSport Vision	16	0	0	0	0	1	23rd
2012	FIA Formula Two Championship	MotorSport Vision	16	0	0	0	0	4	17th
2014	European Touring Car Cup	Engstler Motorsport	6	0	0	0	0	14	10th
2017	European Touring Car Cup	Kraf Racing	9	0	0	1	2	25	7th
2017	TCR Italy Touring Car Championship	Kraf Racing	10	0	0	0	4	63	5th
2017	TCR Trophy Europe	Kraf Racing	2	0	0	0	0	5	11th
2017	World Touring Car Championship	Kraf Racing	2	0	0	0	0	0	NC†
2018	TCR Italy Touring Car Championship	Kraf Racing	4	0	0	0	1	14	19th

=== 24 Hours of Le Mans results ===
Year	Team	Co-Drivers	Car	Class	Laps	Pos.	Class Pos.
2009	(China) Endurance Asia Team (France) Perspective Racing	(Hong Kong) Darryl O'Young (France) Philippe Hesnault	Porsche 997 GT3-RSR	GT2	186	NC	NC

=== Complete GP2 Series results ===
==== Complete GP2 Asia Series results ====
(key) (Races in bold indicate pole position) (Races in italics indicate fastest lap)

Year	Entrant	1	2	3	4	5	6	7	8	DC	Points
2009–10	Trident Racing	ABU1; FEA; Ret	ABU1; SPR; Ret	ABU2; FEA; 16	ABU2; SPR; 20	BHR1; FEA; 22	BHR1; SPR; 16	BHR2; FEA; Ret	BHR2; SPR; 18	33rd	0

=== Complete FIA Formula Two Championship results ===
(key) (Races in bold indicate pole position) (Races in italics indicate fastest lap)

Year	1	2	3	4	5	6	7	8	9	10	11	12	13	14	15	16	17	18	Pos	Points
2010	SIL; 1; 15	SIL; 2; 17	MAR; 1; 12	MAR; 2; 12	MNZ; 1; 10	MNZ; 2; 11	ZOL; 1 Ret	ZOL; 2; 14	ALG; 1 Ret	ALG; 2 Ret	BRH; 1 Ret	BRH; 2; 15	BRN; 1; 15	BRN; 2; 17	OSC; 1; 15	OSC; 2; 14	VAL; 1; 17	VAL; 2; 17	20th	1
2011	SIL; 1 Ret	SIL; 2; 17	MAG; 1 Ret	MAG; 2; 18	SPA; 1 Ret	SPA; 2; 18	NÜR; 1; 17	NÜR; 2; 17	BRH; 1; 12	BRH; 2; 13	SPL; 1; 10	SPL; 2; 15	MNZ; 1; 12	MNZ; 2; 13	CAT; 1; 16	CAT; 2; 17			23rd	1
2012	SIL; 1; 15	SIL; 2; 15	ALG; 1; 15	ALG; 2; 13	NÜR; 1; 11	NÜR; 2 DNS	SPA; 1; 13	SPA; 2; 17	BRH; 1; 11	BRH; 2 Ret	LEC; 1; 12	LEC; 2; 9	HUN; 1; 9	HUN; 2; 13	MNZ; 1; 13	MNZ; 2; 13			17th	4
