= 2017 TCR Italy Touring Car Championship =

Motor race competition

The 2017 TCR Italy Touring Car Championship is the third season of the ITCC to run under TCR regulations and the 31st season since a national touring car series was revived in 1987 as the Campionato Italiano Turismo.

== Teams and drivers ==
Hankook was the official tyre supplier.

Team	Car	No.	Driver	Rounds
TCR Class
(Italy) SEAT Motorsport Italia	SEAT León TCR	2	(Spain) Jordi Gené	7
(Italy) Pit Lane Competizioni	Audi RS 3 LMS TCR	3	(Italy) Max Mugelli	All
(Italy) Pit Lane Competizioni	Audi RS 3 LMS TCR	71	(Italy) Enrico Bettera	2–3
(Italy) Pit Lane Competizioni	Audi RS 3 LMS TCR	92	(Italy) Carlotta Fedeli	6
(Italy) Pit Lane Competizioni	SEAT León TCR	8	(Italy) Nicola Baldan	All
(Italy) Pit Lane Competizioni	Volkswagen Golf GTI TCR	21	(Italy) Massimo Gagliano	3–7
(Italy) BF Motorsport	SEAT León Racer	4	(Italy) Vincenzo Montalbano	All
(Italy) BF Motorsport	SEAT León Racer	4	(Italy) Giuseppe Montalbano	All
(Italy) BF Motorsport	SEAT León TCR	23	(Italy) Alessandro Thellung	All
(Italy) BF Motorsport	SEAT León TCR	23	(Italy) Nicolò Zin	1
(Italy) BF Motorsport	SEAT León TCR	23	(Italy) Matteo Bergonzini	2–3
(Italy) BF Motorsport	SEAT León TCR	23	(Italy) Daniel Verrocchio	4–5
(Italy) BF Motorsport	SEAT León TCR	23	(Italy) Fabrizio Giovanardi	6
(Estonia) MM Motorsport	Honda Civic Type R TCR	9	(Italy) Eric Scalvini	All
(Estonia) MM Motorsport	Honda Civic Type R TCR	12	(Italy) Gian Maria Gabbiani	3–4
(Estonia) MM Motorsport	Honda Civic Type R TCR	12	(Italy) Andrea Mosca	3–4
(Estonia) MM Motorsport	Honda Civic Type R TCR	14	(Italy) Jonathan Giacon	5
(Estonia) MM Motorsport	Honda Civic Type R TCR	46	(Italy) Felice Tedeschi	4
(Estonia) MM Motorsport	Honda Civic Type R TCR	46	(Italy) Davide Nardilli	6–7
(Estonia) MM Motorsport	Honda Civic Type R TCR	47	(Italy) Samuel Piccin	1–2
(Estonia) MM Motorsport	Honda Civic Type R TCR	47	(Italy) Davide Nardilli	1
(Estonia) MM Motorsport	Honda Civic Type R TCR	47	(Italy) Gian Maria Gabbiani	2
(Estonia) MM Motorsport	Honda Civic Type R TCR	47	(Italy) Alberto Viberti	6
(Estonia) MM Motorsport	Honda Civic Type R TCR	93	(Italy) Luigi Bamonte	2–3
(Italy) Target Competition	Audi RS 3 LMS TCR	10	(Italy) Giacomo Altoè	7
(Italy) V-Action Racing	Alfa Romeo Giulietta TCR	10	(Italy) Giacomo Altoè	5
(Italy) V-Action Racing	Alfa Romeo Giulietta TCR	11	(Sweden) Joakim Darbom	5
(Italy) V-Action Racing	Alfa Romeo Giulietta TCR	19	(Italy) Tommaso Mosca	7
(Italy) V-Action Racing	Alfa Romeo Giulietta TCR	54	(Italy) Luigi Ferrara	7
(Italy) Tecnodom Sport	SEAT León TCR	14	(Italy) Domiziano Giacon	1
(Italy) Tecnodom Sport	SEAT León TCR	14	(Italy) Silvano Bolzoni	1
(Italy) Tecnodom Sport	SEAT León TCR	24	(Italy) Nicolò Zin	2
(Italy) Tecnodom Sport	Opel Astra TCR	15	(Italy) Jonathan Giacon	1, 3
(Italy) Tecnodom Sport	Opel Astra TCR	15	(Italy) Kevin Giacon	All
(Italy) Nos Racing–Ermete	SEAT León Racer	18	(Italy) Massimiliano Chini	1–4
(Italy) Nos Racing–Ermete	SEAT León Racer	18	(Italy) Nello Nataloni	1–3
(Italy) Nos Racing–Ermete	SEAT León Racer	18	(Italy) Cosimo Barberini	4–5, 7
(Italy) Nos Racing–Ermete	SEAT León Racer	18	(Italy) Alex Campani	5
(Italy) MC Corse	Volkswagen Golf GTI TCR	21	(Italy) Massimo Gagliano	1–2
South Italy Racing Team	SEAT León TCR	22	(Italy) Andrea Argenti	1–2
(Bulgaria) Kraf Racing	Audi RS 3 LMS TCR	44	(Bulgaria) Plamen Kralev	1–5
(Austria) Simon Reicher Motorsport Activities	Audi RS 3 LMS TCR	54	(Austria) Simon Reicher	3
(Italy) CRC - Cappellari Reparto Corse	SEAT León Racer	76	(Italy) Daniele Cappellari	1–4
(United Kingdom) VFL Racing	Honda Civic Type R TCR	88	(United Kingdom) Finlay Crocker	4–5
(Italy) Top Run Motorsport	Subaru WRX STi TCR	99	(Switzerland) Stefano Comini	5, 7
TCT Class
(Italy) Arduini Corse	Peugeot 308 Racing Cup	102	(Italy) Francesco Neri	1
(Italy) Arduini Corse	Peugeot 308 Racing Cup	102	(Italy) Giovanni Lopes	1
(Italy) Arduini Corse	Peugeot 308 Racing Cup	102	(Italy) Andrea Brambilla	2
(Italy) Arduini Corse	Peugeot 308 Racing Cup	102	(Italy) Dario Pennica	2
(Italy) Arduini Corse	Peugeot 308 Racing Cup	102	(Italy) Gianluca Mauriello	4
(Italy) Arduini Corse	Peugeot 308 Racing Cup	102	(Italy) Andrea Farina	4
(Italy) Arduini Corse	Peugeot 308 Racing Cup	102	(Italy) Alessandro Vai	5
(Italy) Arduini Corse	Peugeot 308 Racing Cup	102	(Italy) Marco Pascalli	5
(Italy) Arduini Corse	Peugeot 308 Racing Cup	102	(Italy) Lorenzo Baroni	6
(Italy) Arduini Corse	Peugeot 308 Racing Cup	102	(Italy) Giovanni Mancini	6–7
(Italy) Arduini Corse	Peugeot 308 Racing Cup	102	(Italy) Monica Della	7
(Italy) Arduini Corse	Peugeot 308 Racing Cup	103	(Italy) Stefano Accorsi	1
(Italy) Arduini Corse	Peugeot 308 Racing Cup	103	(Italy) Massimo Arduini	1–2, 4–5
(Italy) Arduini Corse	Peugeot 308 Racing Cup	103	(Italy) Alberto Sabbatini	4
(Italy) Arduini Corse	Peugeot 308 Racing Cup	103	(Italy) Andrea Stassano	5
(Italy) Arduini Corse	Peugeot 308 Racing Cup	103	(Italy) Alberto Perucca	7
(Italy) Arduini Corse	Peugeot 308 Racing Cup	103	(Italy) Paolo Piravano	7
(Italy) Sport&Comunicazione	Peugeot 308 Racing Cup	104	(Italy) Adriano Bernazzani	1–3
(Italy) Sport&Comunicazione	Peugeot 308 Racing Cup	104	(Italy) Raimondo Ricci	1–5, 7
(Italy) Autostar Motorsport	Peugeot 308 Racing Cup	104	(Italy) Raimondo Ricci	1–5, 7
(Italy) Autostar Motorsport	Peugeot 308 Racing Cup	104	(Italy) Pasquale Notarnicola	5, 7
(Italy) Etruria	Alfa Romeo Giulietta QV	108	(Italy) Andrea Bacci	2–3
(Italy) Etruria	Alfa Romeo Giulietta QV	109	(Italy) Andrea Mosca	2
(Brazil) Prisma Motorsport	Alfa Romeo Giulietta QV	111	(Brazil) Felipe Guimarães	5–6
(Brazil) Prisma Motorsport	Alfa Romeo Giulietta QV	112	(Italy) Riccardo Moretti	5
(France) Belt Racing	Peugeot 308 Racing Cup	155	(Spain) Alberto Moncayo	6
(France) Belt Racing	Peugeot 308 Racing Cup	156	(Italy) Patrick Reiterer	5

== Calendar and results ==
The previous schedule for 2017 was announced on November 24, 2016, but on February 16, 2017 a new calendar was announced with changes of dates and with all the events scheduled to be held in Italy.

Rnd.		Circuit	Date	Pole position	Fastest lap	Winning driver	Winning team	Supporting
1	1	Adria International Raceway, Adria	7 May	(Italy) Jonathan Giacon	(Italy) Eric Scalvini	(Italy) Eric Scalvini	(Estonia) MM Motorsport	Italian Formula 4 Championship
1	2	Adria International Raceway, Adria	7 May	(Italy) Jonathan Giacon	(Italy) Jonathan Giacon	(Italy) Eric Scalvini	(Estonia) MM Motorsport	Italian Formula 4 Championship
2	3	Misano World Circuit Marco Simoncelli, Misano Adriatico	4 June	(Italy) Nicola Baldan	(Italy) Nicola Baldan	(Italy) Nicola Baldan	(Italy) Pit Lane Competizioni	Italian GT Championship; Porsche Carrera Cup Italia
2	4	Misano World Circuit Marco Simoncelli, Misano Adriatico	4 June	(Italy) Eric Scalvini	(Italy) Nicola Baldan	(Italy) Eric Scalvini	(Estonia) MM Motorsport	Italian GT Championship; Porsche Carrera Cup Italia
3	5	Autodromo Nazionale Monza, Monza	18 June	(Italy) Kevin Giacon	(Italy) Eric Scalvini	(Italy) Nicola Baldan	(Italy) Pit Lane Competizioni	Italian GT Championship
3	6	Autodromo Nazionale Monza, Monza	18 June	(Italy) Nicola Baldan	(Italy) Nicola Baldan	(Italy) Nicola Baldan	(Italy) Pit Lane Competizioni	Italian GT Championship
4	7	Mugello Circuit, Scarperia	16 July	(Italy) Nicola Baldan	(Italy) Nicola Baldan	(Italy) Kevin Giacon	(Italy) Tecnodom Sport	Italian GT Championship Italian Formula 4 Championship; Porsche Carrera Cup Italia
4	8	Mugello Circuit, Scarperia	16 July	(Italy) Nicola Baldan	(Italy) Nicola Baldan	(Italy) Nicola Baldan	(Italy) Pit Lane Competizioni	Italian GT Championship Italian Formula 4 Championship; Porsche Carrera Cup Italia
5	9	Autodromo Enzo e Dino Ferrari, Imola	10 September	(Italy) Nicola Baldan	(Italy) Nicola Baldan	(Italy) Jonathan Giacon	(Italy) Tecnodom Sport	Italian GT Championship Italian Formula 4 Championship; Porsche Carrera Cup Italia
5	10	Autodromo Enzo e Dino Ferrari, Imola	10 September	(Italy) Nicola Baldan	(Switzerland) Stefano Comini	(Italy) Nicola Baldan	(Italy) Pit Lane Competizioni	Italian GT Championship Italian Formula 4 Championship; Porsche Carrera Cup Italia
6	11	ACI Vallelunga Circuit, Campagnano di Roma	24 September	(Italy) Nicola Baldan	(Italy) Davide Nardilli	(Italy) Kevin Giacon	(Italy) Tecnodom Sport	Italian GT Championship
6	12	ACI Vallelunga Circuit, Campagnano di Roma	24 September	(Italy) Nicola Baldan	(Italy) Max Mugelli	(Italy) Nicola Baldan	(Italy) Pit Lane Competizioni	Italian GT Championship
7	13	Autodromo Nazionale Monza, Monza	22 October	(Italy) Giacomo Altoè	(Italy) Giacomo Altoè	(Italy) Giacomo Altoè	(Italy) Target Competition	Italian Formula 4 Championship; Porsche Carrera Cup Italia
7	14	Autodromo Nazionale Monza, Monza	22 October	(Italy) Nicola Baldan	(Italy) Giacomo Altoè	(Italy) Nicola Baldan	(Italy) Pit Lane Competizioni	Italian Formula 4 Championship; Porsche Carrera Cup Italia

== Drivers' championship ==
Scoring systems

Position	**1st**	**2nd**	**3rd**	**4th**	**5th**	**6th**	**7th**	**8th**	**9th**	**10th**
Points	20	15	12	8	7	5	4	3	2	1

One point for pole position and one point for fastests lap.

=== TCR Standing ===
Pos.	Driver	ADR		MIS		MNZ		MUG		IMO		VAL		MNZ		Pts.
Pos.	Driver	RD1	RD2	RD1	RD2	RD1	RD2	RD1	RD2	RD1	RD2	RD1	RD2	RD1	RD2	Pts.
1	(Italy) Nicola Baldan	3	3	**1**	**Ret**	1	**1**	**5**	**1**	**11**	**1**	**3**	**1**	2	**1**	210
2	(Italy) Eric Scalvini	1	1	3	1	5	2	2	8	2	2	7	Ret	5	8	158
3	(Italy) Kevin Giacon			Ret	DNS	**15**†	14	1	2	3	3	1	2	6	7	107
4	(Italy) Max Mugelli	4	15	5	2	6	13	4	3	6	11	4	3	7	3	97
5	(Bulgaria) Plamen Kralev	NC	Ret	2	3	2	5	3	9	14	13					63
6	(Italy) Massimiliano Gagliano	13	5	9	7	3	3	6	7	8	Ret	6	7	9	DNS	61
7	(Italy) Jonatan Giacon	**2**	**2**			**15**†	14			1	6					58
8	(Italy) Giacomo Altoè									Ret	5			**1**	2	45
9	(Italy) Vincenzo Montalbano (Italy) Giuseppe Montalbano	11	6	Ret	8	10	10	15	4	7	10	5	5	12	10	43
10	(Italy) Davide Nardilli	6	8									2	8	8	4	38
11	(Italy) Alessandro Thellung	Ret	9	7	4	9	6	9	Ret	10	Ret	8	4	11	Ret	36
12	(Italy) Andrea Argenti	5	4	4	Ret	7	7									31
13	(Switzerland) Stefano Comini									Ret	4			3	11	24
14	(Italy) Matteo Bergonzini			7	4	9	6									19
15	(Italy) Daniele Cappellari	7	7	10	Ret	8	8	11	10							17
16	(Austria) Simon Reicher					4	4									16
17	(Italy) Cosimo Barberini							13	5	9	8			10	Ret	13
18	(United Kingdom) Finlay Crocker							16†	14	4	7					12
19	(Italy) Enrico Bettera			6	5	Ret	Ret									12
20	(Italy) Fabrizio Giovanardi											8	4			11
21	(Italy) Samuel Piccin	6	8	8	Ret											11
22	(Spain) Jordi Gené													4	12	10
23	(Italy) Massimiliano Chini	DSQ	10	12	12	13	11	13	5							10
24	(Sweden) Joakim Darbom									5	9					9
25	(Italy) Felice Tedeschi							7	6							9
26	(Italy) Nicolò Zin	Ret	9	11	6											7
27	(Italy) Gian Maria Gabbiani			8	Ret	12	9	10	12							7
28	(Italy) Alberto Viberti											EX	6			5
29	(Italy) Alex Campani									9	8					5
30	(Italy) Andrea Mosca					12	9	10	12							4
31	(Italy) Daniel Verrocchio							9	Ret	10	Ret					4
32	(Italy) Domiziano Giacon (Italy) Silvano Bolzoni	8	13													3
33	(Italy) Nello Nataloni	DSQ	10	12	12											3
34	(Italy) Luigi Bamonte			15	14	14	12									1
35	(Italy) Tommaso Mosca													16	DNS	0
36	(Italy) Luigi Ferrara													17	DNS	0
37	(Italy) Carlotta Fedeli											EX	Ret			0
Pos.	Driver	ADR		MIS		MNZ		MUG		IMO		VAL		MNZ		Pts.

Colour	Result
Gold	Winner
Silver	Second place
Bronze	Third place
Green	Points classification
Blue	Non-points classification
Blue	Non-classified finish (NC)
Purple	Retired, not classified (Ret)
Red	Did not qualify (DNQ)
Red	Did not pre-qualify (DNPQ)
Black	Disqualified (DSQ)
White	Did not start (DNS)
White	Withdrew (WD)
White	Race cancelled (C)
Blank	Did not practice (DNP)
Blank	Did not arrive (DNA)
Blank	Excluded (EX)

**Bold** – Pole
Italics – Fastest Lap

† – Drivers did not finish the race, but were classified as they completed over 75% of the race distance.

=== TCT Trophy ===
Pos.	Driver	ADR		MIS		MNZ		MUG		IMO		VAL		MNZ		Pts.
Pos.	Driver	RD1	RD2	RD1	RD2	RD1	RD2	RD1	RD2	RD1	RD2	RD1	RD2	RD1	RD2	Pts.
1	(Italy) Raimondo Ricci	10	11	14	9	11	13	8	11	12	12			13	6	217
2	(Italy) Adriano Bernazzani	10	11	14	9	11	13									110
3	(Italy) Massimo Arduini	12	12	13	10			12	DNS	16	DNS					82
4	(Brazil) Felipe Guimarães									11	14	10	10			62
5	(Italy) Lorenzo Baroni											9	9			40
6	(Italy) Francesco Neri (Italy) Giovanni Lopes	9	14													32
7	(Italy) Stefano Accorsi	12	12													27
8	(Italy) Patrick Reiterer									13	13					27
9	(Italy) Andrea Farina (Italy) Gianluca Mauriello							14	13							27
10	(Italy) Dario Pennica (Italy) Andrea Brambilla			16	11											24
11	(Italy) Monica Della													14	13	23
12	(Spain) Alberto Moncayo													Ret	5	20
13	(Italy) Pasquale Notarnicola									14	Ret			Ret	9	20
14	(Italy) Alberto Sabbatini							12	DNS							15
15	(Italy) Andrea Stassano									15	16					14
16	(Italy) Riccardo Moretti											11	Ret			12
17	(Italy) Alberto Perucca (Italy) Paolo Piravano													15	Ret	12
18	(Italy) Alessandro Vai (Italy) Marco Pascalli									Ret	15					8
19	(Italy) Andrea Mosca			DNS	Ret					Ret	17					5
20	(Italy) Andrea Bacci			DNS	Ret	Ret	DNS									0
Pos.	Driver	ADR		MIS		MNZ		MUG		IMO		VAL		MNZ		Pts.

† – Drivers did not finish the race, but were classified as they completed over 75% of the race distance.

=== TCR Constructors Standing ===
Pos.	Driver	ADR		MIS		MNZ		MUG		IMO		VAL		MNZ		Pts.
Pos.	Driver	RD1	RD2	RD1	RD2	RD1	RD2	RD1	RD2	RD1	RD2	RD1	RD2	RD1	RD2	Pts.
1	(Spain) SEAT León	3	3	1	4	1	1	5	1	7	1	3	1	2	1	199
2	(Japan) Honda Civic Type R TCR	1	1	3	1	5	2	2	6	1	2	2	6	5	4	174
3	(Germany) Audi RS 3 LMS TCR	4	15	2	2	2	4	3	3	6	11	4	3	1	2	145
4	(Germany) Opel Astra TCR	2	2	Ret	DNS	15†	14	1	2	3	3	1	2	6	7	136
5	(Germany) Volkswagen Golf GTI TCR	13	5	9	7	3	3	6	7	8	Ret	6	7	9	DNS	61
6	(Japan) Subaru WRX STi TCR									Ret	4			3	11	23
7	(Italy) Alfa Romeo Giulietta TCR									5	5			16	DNS	14
Pos.	Driver	ADR		MIS		MNZ		MUG		IMO		VAL		MNZ		Pts.

† – Drivers did not finish the race, but were classified as they completed over 75% of the race distance.
