= Valentina Albanese =

Italian racing driver

- Nationality: Italian
- Born: 27 March 1974 (age 52) Rome, Italy

Championship titles
- 2009, 2015 2015: Italian Tourism Endurance Championship; TCR Italy Touring Car Championship

Valentina Albanese (born 27 March 1974) is an Italian racing driver, the winner of the 2015 Italian Tourism Endurance Championship and the 2015 TCR Italy Touring Car Championship.

Albanese began her career in motorsport in 1996. From 2008, she began racing at a professional level by participating in the Fun Cup Italia. Autosprint magazine awarded her in 2010 and 2015 with the gold helmet as the best female driver. Since 2016, she has been the sporting director of Porsche in Italy.
