= Pit Lane Competizioni =

(Italy) Pit Lane Competizioni
- Founded: 2009
- Team principal(s): Roberto Remelli
- Current series: TCR International Series; Italian Touring Car Championship; Touring Car Endurance Series; Italian SEAT León Cup
- Noted drivers: TCR; 36. (Italy) Enrico Bettera; ITCC; 3. (Italy) Max Mugelli; 8. (Italy) Nicola Baldan; 71. (Italy) Enrico Bettera; TCE; 122. (United States) Zach Arnold (Italy) Roberto Ferri (France) John Filippi (Italy) Alberto Vescovi (Italy) Enrico Bettera; SEAT León Cup; 23. (Italy) Enrico Bettera (Italy) Francesco Guerra; 55. (Italy) Lorenzo Pegoraro (Italy) Ivan Tramontozzi; 92. (Italy) Carlotta Fedeli
- Teams' Championships: 2016 SEAT León Cup Italia
- Drivers' Championships: 2016 SEAT León Cup Italia (Baldan)
- Website: http://www.pitlanecompetizioni.com

Pit Lane Competizioni is an Italian auto racing team based in Piubega, Italy. The team has raced in the TCR International Series, since 2017. The team also races in the Italian Touring Car Championship, Touring Car Endurance Series and SEAT León Cup Italia.

== Italian Touring Car Championship ==
Having first entered the championship in 2016, running a single SEAT León Cup Racer for Enrico Bettera. The team finished fifth in the drivers championship, with Bettera only taking part in partial season. They returned in 2017 running a SEAT León TCR for 2016 SEAT León Cup Italia champion Nicola Baldan and two Audi RS 3 LMS TCR for Enrico Bettera and Max Mugelli. However Bettera first joined the team for the second round of the championship. With Baldan taking the first victory of the season at the second round held at Misano.

== TCR International Series ==
=== Audi RS 3 LMS TCR (2017–) ===
After having raced in the Italian Touring Car Championship, the team entered the 2017 TCR International Series with Enrico Bettera driving an Audi RS 3 LMS TCR. Bettera qualified 21st and finished 16th in Race 1 before finishing 12th in Race 2.
