= Enrico Bettera =

Italian racing driver

- Nationality: Italian
- Born: 13 July 1971 (age 55) Iseo, Italy

TCR International Series career
- Debut season: 2017
- Current team: Pit Lane Competizioni
- Car number: 36
- Starts: 2

Previous series
- 2016-17 2016-17 2015 2014-16 2013-15 2011-13 2010 2009 2009: Italian Touring Car Championship; Touring Car Endurance Series; Euro Series by Nova Race; Renault Clio Cup Italia; Coppa Italia; Eurocup Mégane Trophy; Ferrari Challenge Italy; Gloria Scouting Cup; Italian SEAT León Supercópa

Championship titles
- 2013-15: Coppa Italia

Enrico Bettera (born 13 July 1971) is an Italian racing driver currently competing in the TCR International Series and Italian Touring Car Championship. Having previously competed in the Eurocup Mégane Trophy, Touring Car Endurance Series and Renault Clio Cup Italia amongst others.

== Racing career ==
Bettera began his career in 2009 in the Italian SEAT León Supercópa. In 2010, he switched to the Italian Ferrari Challenge. For 2011, he switched to the Eurocup Mégane Trophy, he finished his first season in the championship sixth in the AM Trophy. He continued in the series for 2012 and 2013, finishing fourth in the AM Trophy in 2013. In 2013, he also raced in the Coppa Italia series and won the Division 1 title that year, he continued in the series for two more seasons and won the Division 1 title both years. In 2014, he made the switch to the Italian Renault Clio Cup, racing there for several seasons in the championship. Before making the switch to the Italian Touring Car Championship in 2016, he finished his partial season fifth in the standings after four podiums and one victory. He continued in the series again in 2017, this time for a full season.

In June 2017, it was announced that Beterra would race in the TCR International Series, driving an Audi RS 3 LMS TCR for Pit Lane Competizioni.

== Racing record ==
=== Complete TCR International Series results ===
(key) (Races in bold indicate pole position) (Races in italics indicate fastest lap)

Year	Team	Car	1	2	3	4	5	6	7	8	9	10	11	12	13	14	15	16	17	18	19	20	DC	Points
2017	Pit Lane Competizioni	Audi RS 3 LMS TCR	GEO; 1	GEO; 2	BHR; 1	BHR; 2	BEL; 1	BEL; 2	ITA; 1	ITA; 2	AUT; 1; 16	AUT; 2; 12	HUN; 1	HUN; 2	GER; 1	GER; 2	THA; 1	THA; 2	CHN; 1	CHN; 2	ABU; 1	ABU; 2	NC*	0*

^{†} Driver did not finish the race, but was classified as he completed over 90% of the race distance.
^{*} Season still in progress.
