= Daniele Cappellari =

Italian racing driver (born 1976)

- Nationality: Italian
- Born: 9 August 1976 (age 50) Cittadella, Italy

TCR International Series career
- Debut season: 2017
- Current team: CRC - Cappellari Reparto Corse
- Car number: 76
- Starts: 2

Previous series
- 2016-17 2014-15 2007-12 2000, 03-05: Italian Touring Car Championship; Coppa Italia; Italian Historical Car Championship; Formula Crono

Championship titles
- 2014 2007-09, 11-12 2000, 03-05: Coppa Italia; Italian Historical Car Championship Formula Crono

Daniele Cappellari (born 9 August 1976) is an Italian racing driver currently competing in the TCR International Series and Italian Touring Car Championship. Having previously competed in several historic racing championships.

== Racing career ==
Cappellari began his career in 2000 in the Italian Formula Crono series, where he won the championship four times. In 2007, he switched to the Italian Historical Car Championship, he went on to win the title five times, from 2007-12. For 2014, he switched to the Coppa Italia series, he won the Division 1 title that year. Before switching to Division 2, finishing second in championships standings. In 2016, he made the switch to the Italian Touring Car Championship, he finished the season fourth in the standings after three podiums and only one single retirement. He continued in the series again in 2017.

In May 2017, it was announced that Cappellari would race in the TCR International Series, driving a SEAT León TCR for his own team CRC - Cappellari Reparto Corse.

== Racing record ==
=== Complete TCR International Series results ===
(key) (Races in bold indicate pole position) (Races in italics indicate fastest lap)

Year	Team	Car	1	2	3	4	5	6	7	8	9	10	11	12	13	14	15	16	17	18	19	20	DC	Points
2017	CRC - Cappellari Reparto Corse	SEAT León TCR	GEO; 1	GEO; 2	BHR; 1	BHR; 2	BEL; 1	BEL; 2	ITA; 1; 15	ITA; 2; 15	AUT; 1	AUT; 2	HUN; 1	HUN; 2	GER; 1	GER; 2	THA; 1	THA; 2	CHN; 1	CHN; 2	ABU; 1	ABU; 2	NC*	0*

^{†} Driver did not finish the race, but was classified as he completed over 90% of the race distance.
^{*} Season still in progress.
