= Élite Motorsport =

(Italy) Élite Motorsport
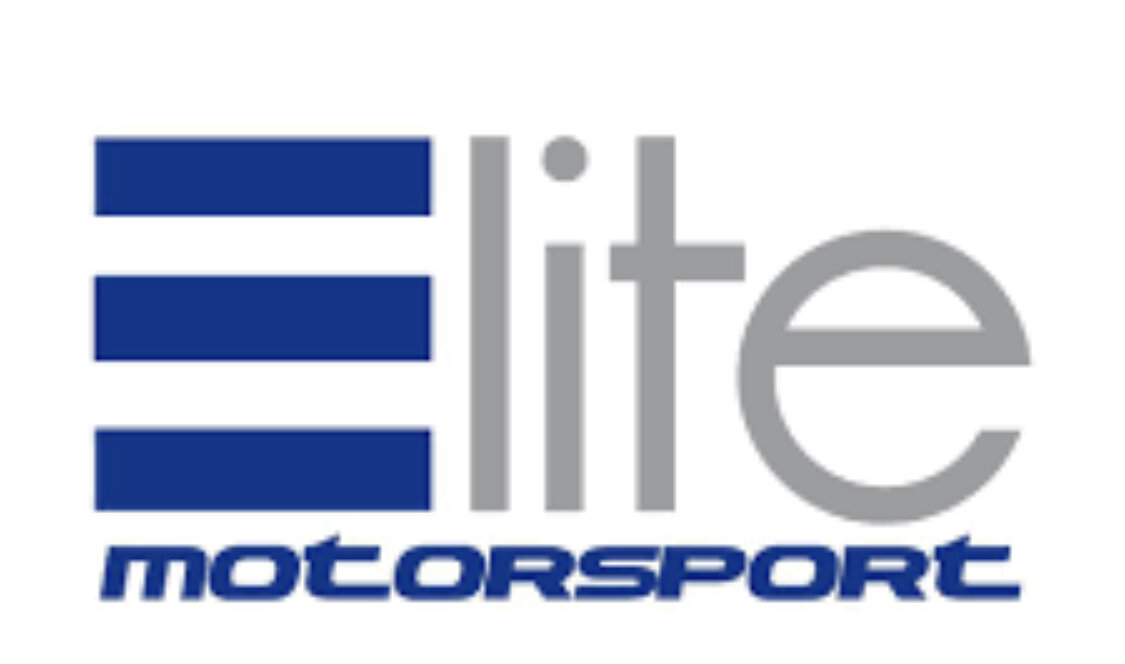
- Team principal(s): Nicola Novaglio
- Current series: TCR Europe Touring Car Series; TCR Italy Touring Car Championship; ADAC TCR Germany Touring Car Championship
- Former series: Touring Car Endurance Series
- Current drivers: (Portugal) Luís Cidade (Italy) Marco Butti (Switzerland) Miklas Born (Italy) Rodolfo Massaro (Italy) Mauro Trentin
- Website: https://www.elitemotorsport.it

Élite Motorsport is an Italian auto racing team based in Brescia, Italy. The team has raced in the Italian Touring Car Championship and also in Touring Car Endurance Series and Rally Race.

== History ==
The team has participated in various championships of touring car and also in Rally races. In 2019 he participated in the main national touring car championships including the TCR Italy Touring Car Championship and TCR DSG Endurance. In 2020 the team announced its participation in the TCR Italy Touring Car Championship and TCR DSG Endurance Europe.
