= Massimo Arduini =

Italian racing driver (born 1960)

Massimo Arduini (born 4 February 1960) is an Italian racing driver. He competed in the Italian Touring Car Championship, and was champion in 2007 with a Honda Civic. In the same year, he took part in ETCC., and in 2008, won the ITCC in a Honda Accord for Team Mercurio GPS. In 2010, he won the Italian championship super production with AMG C class. In 2015, he won the Italian championship 1.6 turbo. In 2016, he took part to motorshow in Bologna and arrived second overall with Citroen C3 MAX, losing the first place for 0.03". In 2017 Arduini is competing in the TCT series as the official Peugeot Italy pilot with 308 RC, coaching the Italian actor Stefano Accorsi.

Sporting positions
Preceded by Cesare Cremonesi	Italian Touring Car Champion; 2008	Succeeded by incumbent
