= Italian Superturismo Championship =

Italian motorcycle race

- Category: Touring cars
- Country: Italy
- Inaugural season: 1987
- Drivers' champion: (Canada) Nicolas Taylor
- Teams' champion: (Estonia) ALM Motorsport

The TCR Italy Touring Car Championship (formerly known as Campionato Italiano Superturismo) is Italy's national motorsport series for touring cars. It was established in 1987 and its drivers' title has been held by such notable drivers as Le Mans winners Emanuele Pirro and Rinaldo Capello, and two-time Champ Car champion Alex Zanardi.

== History ==
Established in 1987 under Group A rules the series saw champions like Johnny Cecotto, Roberto Ravaglia and Nicola Larini winning the title before switching to Supertouring regulations in 1993. The first season of D2 Class saw the battel between Roberto Ravaglia with BMW 318i, Fabrizio Giovanardi with Peugeot 405 and Gabriele Tarquini with Alfa Romeo 155. The title was won by Ravaglia who was able to score points in every race although Giovanardi and Tarquini won many races in the second part of the season and tried to recover the initially gap.

The following year saw the debut of the Audi with the model Audi 80 Quattro who won in 1993 French Supertouring Championship with Frank Biela. The Audi 80 Quattro was immediately competitive and thanks to 6 wins and 5 seconds place Emanuele Pirro won the 1994 Italian Superturismo Championship against the Alfa driver Antonio Tamburini.

In 1995 Audi replaced the old Audi 80 Quattro with the new A4 Quattro. The new model was dominant winning 14 races on 20. Once again the title went to Emanuele Pirro.

The 1996 saw the triple battle between Rinaldo Capello with A4 Quattro and the 2 ex F1 drivers Emanuele Naspetti and Johnny Cecotto both with BMW 320i. After a promising first half of the season with 6 victories in 10 races, Rinaldo Capello had to defend from the 2 BMW Drivers who won 9 races on 10 in the second half of the season. The final Round in Vallelunga elected Rinaldo Capello as Italian Champion although the big effort of BMW who raced with 6 cars.

In 1997 Audi was burdened with 30kg extra by FIA who also banned the 4WD from the 1998. The consequence was a low competitivity of the two Audi drivers. After 3 years the Italian Title was won again by BMW who took the revenge from 1996 with Emanuele Naspetti who achieved 10 races, 7 second places and 1 this place in a total of 20 races.

In 1998 the Italian Supertouring had to face many problems. Due to a controversial decision the historical Promoter Salerno Corse was replaced by the Sponsor Service. The new promoter decided to make one sprint race of 50km and one endurance race of 100km. Alfa Romeo and Nordauto Engineering (the team that became N.Technology) had run the Alfa Romeo 155 during the 1993–1997 years but wouldn't win the series until they introduced their Alfa Romeo 156 model in 1998. Fabrizio Giovanardi won in that car both in 1998 and 1999.

In 1999 Audi officially withdrew to focus on Le Mans Project, letting just Alfa and BMW to fight for the title.

Due to lack of cars the serie was definitively abandoned at the end of 1999 to allow the creaction of Euro STC in 2000.

== Revival ==
The cancellation of the FIA Super Production championship in 2002 would mean the resumption of the Superturismo championship, albeit now under Super Production rules and named the Superproduzione. The SP cars were in many ways less advanced than the Super 2000 relatives in the ETCC. Salvatore Tavano won the 2003 Superproduzione season in an Alfa Romeo 147. The championship became an all-147 series in 2004 won by Adriano De Micheli. The season saw a very low number of entries with between four and six participants each weekend.

The ETCC became the World Touring Car Championship (WTCC) in 2005. At the same time the Superturismo was truly revived with Super 2000 rules. Alessandro Zanardi would win the first season in a BMW 320i. In 2006 SEAT joined the championship as a full works team with two Leóns driven by Roberto Colciago and Davide Roda. Colciago won the title ahead of returning 1997 champion Emanuele Naspetti in a BMW 320i.

In 2007 the championship changed its promoter to Peroni Promotion and was renamed ITCC (Italian Touring Car Competition). However, grids were small as several teams moved to the WTCC and the Superstars Series, and the series was merged with the Peroni-run Driver's Trophy midway through 2008.

For the 2016 season, the championship adopted TCR regulations for the main class.

== Champions ==
| Series Name | Season | Champion | Team Champion |
|---|---|---|---|
| Italian Superturismo Championship | 1987 | (Italy) Michele Di Gioia (BMW M3) | none |
| Italian Superturismo Championship | 1988 | (Italy) Gianfranco Brancatelli (Alfa Romeo 75 Turbo) | none |
| Italian Superturismo Championship | 1989 | (Venezuela) Johnny Cecotto (BMW M3) | none |
| Italian Superturismo Championship | 1990 | (Italy) Roberto Ravaglia (BMW M3) | none |
| Italian Superturismo Championship | 1991 | (Italy) Roberto Ravaglia (BMW M3) | none |
| Italian Superturismo Championship | 1992 | (Italy) Nicola Larini (Alfa Romeo 155 GTA) | (Italy) Alfa Corse |
| Italian Superturismo Championship | 1993 | (Italy) Roberto Ravaglia (BMW 318i) | (Italy) CiBiEmme Engineering |
| Italian Superturismo Championship | 1994 | (Italy) Emanuele Pirro (Audi 80 Quattro) | (Italy) Audi Sport Italia |
| Italian Superturismo Championship | 1995 | (Italy) Emanuele Pirro (Audi A4 Quattro) | (Italy) Audi Sport Italia |
| Italian Superturismo Championship | 1996 | (Italy) Rinaldo Capello (Audi A4 Quattro) | (Italy) CiBiEmme Engineering |
| Italian Superturismo Championship | 1997 | (Italy) Emanuele Naspetti (BMW 320i) | (Italy) CiBiEmme Engineering |
| Italian Superturismo Championship | 1998 | (Italy) Fabrizio Giovanardi (Alfa Romeo 156) | (Italy) Nordauto Engineering |
| Italian Superturismo Championship | 1999 | (Italy) Fabrizio Giovanardi (Alfa Romeo 156) | (Italy) Nordauto Engineering |
| Italian Super Production Championship | 2001 | (Italy) Fabio Francia (Alfa Romeo 147) | none |
| Italian Super Production Championship | 2002 | (Italy) Massimo Pigoli (BMW 320i) | none |
| Italian Super Production Championship | 2003 | (Italy) Salvatore Tavano (Alfa Romeo 147) | none |
| Italian Super Production Championship | 2004 | (Italy) Adriano de Micheli (Alfa Romeo 147) | none |
| Italian Superturismo Championship | 2005 | (Italy) Alessandro Zanardi (BMW 320i) | (Italy) ROAL Motorsport |
| Italian Superturismo Championship | 2006 | (Italy) Roberto Colciago (SEAT León) | (Italy) SEAT Sport Italia |
| Italian Touring Car Competition | 2007 | (Italy) Cesare Cremonesi (BMW 320i) | (Italy) Arsenio Corse |
| Italian Touring Car Competition | 2008 | (Italy) Massimo Arduini (Honda Accord) | (Italy) Team Mercury GPS |
| Campionato Italiano Turismo Endurance | 2008 | (Italy) Luca Cappellari (BMW M3 E92) | none |
| Campionato Italiano Turismo Endurance | 2009 | (Italy) Roberto Colciago (SEAT León Supercopa) | none |
| Campionato Italiano Turismo Endurance | 2010 | (San Marino) Paolo Meloni (BMW M3 E92) | none |
| Campionato Italiano Turismo Endurance | 2011 | (Italy) Piero Necchi (BMW M3 E92) | none |
| Campionato Italiano Turismo Endurance | 2012 | (Italy) Andrea Bacci (BMW M3 E92) | none |
| Campionato Italiano Turismo Endurance | 2013 | (Italy) Giancarlo Busnelli (SEAT León Cupra) | none |
| Campionato Italiano Turismo Endurance | 2014 | (San Marino) Paolo Meloni (Italy) Massimiliano Tresoldi (BMW M3 E92) | none |
| Campionato Italiano Turismo Endurance | 2015 | (Italy) Valentina Albanese (SEAT León Cup Racer) | none |
| Italian Touring Car Championship | 2016 | (Italy) Roberto Colciago (Honda Civic TCR) | none |
| TCR Italian Touring Car Championship | 2017 | (Italy) Nicola Baldan (SEAT León TCR) | none |
| TCR Italian Touring Car Championship | 2018 | (Italy) Salvatore Tavano (Cupra León TCR) | none |
| TCR Italian Touring Car Championship | 2019 | (Italy) Salvatore Tavano (Cupra León TCR) | none |
| TCR Italian Touring Car Championship | 2020 | (Italy) Salvatore Tavano (Cupra León Competicion TCR) | none |
| TCR Italian Touring Car Championship | 2021 | (Finland) Antti Buri (Hyundai i30 N TCR) | none |
| TCR Italian Touring Car Championship | 2022 | (Netherlands) Niels Langeveld (Hyundai Elantra N TCR) | none |
| TCR Italian Touring Car Championship | 2023 | (Argentina) Franco Girolami (Audi RS 3 LMS TCR) | none |
| TCR Italian Touring Car Championship | 2024 | (Canada) Nicolas Taylor (Audi RS 3 LMS TCR) | none |

== Superturismo era ==
=== Race winners ===
| | Driver | Total |
|---|---|---|
| 1 | (Italy) Fabrizio Giovanardi | 29 |
| 2 | (Italy) Emanuele Naspetti | 26 |
| 3 | (Italy) Emanuele Pirro | 17 |
| 4 | (Italy) Rinaldo Capello | 14 |
| 5 | (Venezuela) Johnny Cecotto | 7 |
| 5 | (Italy) Antonio Tamburini | 7 |
| 5 | (Italy) Gabriele Tarquini | 7 |
| 6 | (Italy) Fabrizio De Simone | 6 |
| 6 | (Italy) Nicola Larini | 6 |
| 6 | (Italy) Roberto Ravaglia | 6 |
| 7 | (Italy) Roberto Colciago | 5 |
| 8 | (Italy) Gianni Morbidelli | 4 |
| 9 | (Italy) Stefano Modena | 3 |
| 10 | (Germany) Frank Biela | 2 |
| 11 | (United Kingdom) Gary Ayles | 1 |

| | Manufactures | Total |
|---|---|---|
| 1 | (Italy) Alfa Romeo Giulietta | 102 |
| 2 | (Japan) Honda Civic | 99 |
| 3 | (Germany) BMW 1 Series | 80 |
| 4 | (Germany) Audi A3 | 61 |
| 5 | (France) Peugeot 308 | 45 |
| 6 | (Germany) Volkswagen Golf | 38 |
| 7 | (Germany) Mercedes A Klasse | 30 |
| 8 | (Germany) Opel Astra | 21 |
| 9 | (Spain) Seat Leon | 18 |
| 10 | (France) Renault Megane | 11 |
| 11 | (United States) Chrysler 200C | 7 |
| 12 | (Italy) Fiat Tipo | 2 |

=== Driver statistics ===
| | Driver | Pole Position | Victory | 2nd Place | 3rd Place | Total Podium | Total Race |
|---|---|---|---|---|---|---|---|
| 1 | (Italy) Fabrizio Giovanardi | 24 | 29 | 29 | 17 | 75 | 140 |
| 2 | (Italy) Emanuele Naspetti | 5 | 26 | 25 | 11 | 62 | 120 |
| 3 | (Italy) Emanuele Pirro | 3 | 17 | 12 | 1 | 30 | 46 |
| 4 | (Italy) Rinaldo Capello | 5 | 14 | 16 | 20 | 50 | 120 |
| 5 | (Venezuela) Johnny Cecotto | 5 | 7 | 11 | 7 | 25 | 60 |
| 6 | (Italy) Gabriele Tarquini | 5 | 7 | 5 | 6 | 18 | 30 |
| 7 | (Italy) Antonio Tamburini | 5 | 7 | 1 | 8 | 16 | 62 |
| 8 | (Italy) Nicola Larini | 1 | 6 | 9 | 11 | 26 | 40 |
| 9 | (Italy) Roberto Ravaglia | 3 | 6 | 7 | 8 | 21 | 42 |
| 10 | (Italy) Fabrizio De Simone | 2 | 6 | 6 | 13 | 25 | 60 |
| 11 | (Italy) Roberto Colciago | 2 | 5 | 7 | 3 | 15 | 86 |
| 12 | (Italy) Gianni Morbidelli | 3 | 4 | 0 | 4 | 8 | 44 |
| 13 | (Italy) Stefano Modena | 3 | 3 | 2 | 1 | 6 | 38 |
| 14 | (Germany) Frank Biela | 2 | 2 | 0 | 1 | 3 | 12 |
| 15 | (United Kingdom) Gary Ayles | 0 | 1 | 1 | 5 | 7 | 40 |
| 16 | (France) Yvan Muller | 1 | 0 | 5 | 4 | 9 | 20 |
| 17 | (Italy) Giorgio Francia | 0 | 0 | 2 | 0 | 2 | 6 |
| 18 | (Germany) Alexander Burgstaller | 0 | 0 | 1 | 1 | 2 | 40 |
| 19 | (United Kingdom) Steve Soper | 0 | 0 | 1 | 0 | 1 | 2 |
| 20 | (Austria) Karl Wendlinger | 0 | 0 | 0 | 7 | 7 | 20 |
| 21 | (Italy) Fabian Peroni | 0 | 0 | 0 | 6 | 6 | 42 |
| 22 | (Italy) Tamara Vidali | 1 | 0 | 0 | 2 | 2 | 42 |
| 23 | (Italy) Amato Ferrari | 0 | 0 | 0 | 1 | 1 | 40 |
| 23 | (Italy) Alessandro Nannini | 0 | 0 | 0 | 1 | 1 | 4 |
| 23 | (Italy) Massimo Pigoli | 0 | 0 | 0 | 1 | 1 | 140 |
| 23 | (Italy) Sandro Sardelli | 0 | 0 | 0 | 1 | 1 | 40 |

=== Manufactures statistics ===
| | Manufacture | Pole Position | Victory | 2nd Place | 3rd Place | Total Podium |
|---|---|---|---|---|---|---|
| 1 | (Italy) Alfa Romeo | 36 | 49 | 40 | 45 | 134 |
| 2 | (Germany) BMW | 17 | 47 | 54 | 45 | 146 |
| 3 | (Germany) Audi | 13 | 37 | 34 | 36 | 107 |
| 4 | (France) Peugeot | 4 | 6 | 9 | 12 | 27 |
| 5 | (Germany) Opel | 0 | 1 | 1 | 0 | 2 |
| 6 | (Japan) Honda | 0 | 0 | 2 | 2 | 4 |

- Statistics from 1993 to 1999 with D2 Cars

== See also ==
- Superstars Series
