= Hell (disambiguation) =

Hell, in many religions, is a place of suffering during the afterlife, where wicked or unrighteous souls are punished.

Hell may also refer to:

== Religion and mythology ==
- Hell in Christianity
- Christian views on Hades
- Hel (location), Germanic underworld from which the word "hell" derives
- Gehenna or Gehinnom, in Jewish tradition.
- Jahannam, Gehenna in Islam
- Tartarus
- Underworld, the world of the dead in various religious traditions, located below the world of the living
- Any place or situation of great suffering

== Arts and entertainment ==
=== Film and television ===
- Jigoku (1960 film) (地獄, Hell), also titled The Sinners of Hell a Japanese horror film directed by Nobuo Nakagawa
- Hell (1964 film) or Henri-Georges Clouzot's Inferno (L'enfer), an unfinished French film by Henri-Georges Clouzot
- Hell (1994 film) (L'enfer), a French film directed by Claude Chabrol, adapted from Clouzot's 1964 film
- Hell (2005 film) (L'enfer), a French film directed by Danis Tanović
- Hell (2010 film) (El Infierno), a Mexican crime comedy
- Hell (2011 film), a German science fiction film directed by Tim Fehlbaum
- Hell, the directly translated title of Hellbound (TV Series), a South Korean dark fantasy show from 2021
- "Hell" (Father Ted), a 1996 TV episode
- "Hell" (Squid Game), a 2021 TV episode
- Dr. Hell, a character in the anime series Mazinger Z

=== Literature ===
- Hell (DC Comics), a fictional location in the DC Comics universe
- Hell (Barbusse novel) (L'Enfer), a 1908 novel by Henri Barbusse
- Hell (Davis novel), 1998 novel by Kathryn Davis
- Hell or Hell: A Verse Drama and Photoplay, a 1924 play by Upton Sinclair
- Hell, also known as Inferno, the first volume of the Divine Comedy
- Hell, a locale in the Tomorrow series novels by John Marsden

=== Music ===
==== Artists ====
- Hell (British band), an English heavy metal band
- Hell (American band), a doom metal band from Salem, Oregon
  - Hell I, 2009
  - Hell II, 2010
  - Hell III, 2012
  - Hell, 2015 EP
  - Hell (Hell album), 2017
- DJ Hell, a German house/techno DJ

==== Albums ====
- Hell (James Brown album), 1974
- Hell (Venom album), 2008
- Hell (Die Ärzte album), 2020
- Hell: The Sequel, an EP by Bad Meets Evil

==== Songs ====
- "Hell", a song by Blind Melon from Nico
- "Hell" (Disturbed song), a song by Disturbed, a B-side from the single "Stricken"
- "Hell", a song by Foo Fighters from In Your Honor
- "Hell", a song by King Gizzard & the Lizard Wizard from Infest the Rats' Nest
- "Hell", a song by Pet Shop Boys.
- "Hell", a song by Squirrel Nut Zippers from Hot
- "Hell", a song by Tegan and Sara from Sainthood
- "The Hell Song", a song by Sum 41
- "Hell", a song by Waxahatchee from Saint Cloud
- "Hell" a song by Clown Core

=== Other uses in arts and entertainment ===
- Hell (Bosch), a painting by Hieronymous Bosch
- Hell: A Cyberpunk Thriller, a 1990s video game
- Hell and Fucking Hell (Chapman), art installations by Jake and Dinos Chapman

== Places ==
- Hell, California, a demolished ghost town in the U.S.
- Hell, Michigan, a community in the U.S.
- Hell, Grand Cayman, the Cayman Islands
- Hell, Norway, a village in Stjørdal
- Hell Cave, a cave in Slovenia
- Hell Creek, near Jordan, Montana, U.S.

== Other uses ==
- Hell (crater), a lunar crater named after Maximilian Hell
- Hell (surname)
- Hell.com, a website for web designers and artists
- Hell Pizza, a New Zealand-based pizza chain
- Helles, sometimes called Hell, a light style of beer
- The transmission mode of the Hellschreiber teleprinter
- Hell Energy Drink, a Hungarian energy drink
- Helvetinjärvi ("Hell's Lake"), a national park in Ruovesi, Pirkanmaa, Finland

== See also ==
- L'Enfer (disambiguation) (lit. 'Hell' in French)
- Halle (disambiguation)
- Heaven and Hell (disambiguation)
- Hel (disambiguation)
- Hell on Earth (disambiguation)
- Hellas (disambiguation)
- Helle (disambiguation)
- Jigoku (disambiguation) (lit. 'Hell' in Japanese)
