= 2018 TCR Series seasons =

This article describes some of the 2018 seasons of TCR Series across the world.

== VLN TCR Class ==
The 2018 Veranstaltergemeinschaft Langstreckenpokal Nürburgring TCR Class was the second season for the TCR Class in the championship.

=== Teams and drivers ===
Team	Car	No.	Drivers	Rounds
(Germany) Bonk Motorsport	Peugeot 308 Racing Cup TCR	308	(Germany) Jürgen Nett	1
(Germany) Bonk Motorsport	Peugeot 308 Racing Cup TCR	308	(Germany) Joachim Nett	1
(Germany) Bonk Motorsport	Peugeot 308 Racing Cup TCR	308	(United Kingdom) Bradley Philpot	1
(Germany) Bonk Motorsport	Audi RS3 LMS TCR	810	(Germany) Hermann Bock	1–3
(Germany) Bonk Motorsport	Audi RS3 LMS TCR	810	(Germany) Michael Bonk	1
(Germany) Bonk Motorsport	Audi RS3 LMS TCR	810	(Germany) Max Partl	2
(Norway) Møller Bil Motorsport	Audi RS3 LMS TCR	801	(Norway) Håkon Schjærin	2–3, 5–7–9
(Norway) Møller Bil Motorsport	Audi RS3 LMS TCR	801	(Norway) Atle Gulbrandsen	2–3, 5–7–9
(Norway) Møller Bil Motorsport	Audi RS3 LMS TCR	801	(Norway) Kenneth Østvold	2–3, 5–7–9
(Norway) Møller Bil Motorsport	Audi RS3 LMS TCR	801	(Norway) Anders Lindstad	5
(Finland) LMS Racing	CUPRA León TCR	802	(Finland) Antti Buri	2
(Finland) LMS Racing	CUPRA León TCR	802	(Finland) Kari-Pekka Laaksonen	2
(Germany) Mathilda Racing	Volkswagen Golf GTI TCR	804	(Germany) Moritz Oestreich	5
(Germany) Mathilda Racing	Volkswagen Golf GTI TCR	804	(Germany) Andreas Gülden	5
(Germany) Mathilda Racing	Volkswagen Golf GTI TCR	804	(Germany) Michael Paatz	8
(Germany) Mathilda Racing	Volkswagen Golf GTI TCR	804	(Germany) Christian Schmitz	9
(Germany) Mathilda Racing	Volkswagen Golf GTI TCR	804	(Switzerland) Frederic Yerly	9
(Germany) Mathilda Racing	Volkswagen Golf GTI TCR	804	(Germany) Matthias Wasel	9
(Germany) Mathilda Racing	CUPRA León TCR	806	(Germany) Andreas Gülden	2-7-8-9
(Germany) Mathilda Racing	CUPRA León TCR	806	(Germany) Moritz Oestreich	3–6
(Germany) Mathilda Racing	CUPRA León TCR	806	(Germany) Heiko Hammel	6-8-9
(Germany) S.Pace-Racing	Opel Astra TCR	808	(Germany) Heiko Hammel	5
(Germany) S.Pace-Racing	Opel Astra TCR	808	(Germany) Matthias Wasel	1–4
(Germany) S.Pace-Racing	Opel Astra TCR	808	(Germany) Ben Bünnagel	1–4
(Germany) S.Pace-Racing	Opel Astra TCR	808	(Germany) Markus Diederich	1–3
(South Korea) Hyundai Motorsport N (Italy) Target Competition	Hyundai i30 N TCR	813	(Germany) Manuel Lauck	9
(South Korea) Hyundai Motorsport N (Italy) Target Competition	Hyundai i30 N TCR	813	(Germany) Marc Basseng	9
(South Korea) Hyundai Motorsport N (Italy) Target Competition	Hyundai i30 N TCR	830	(South Korea) Kang Byung Hui	1
(South Korea) Hyundai Motorsport N (Italy) Target Competition	Hyundai i30 N TCR	830	(South Korea) Kim Jae Kyun	1
(South Korea) Hyundai Motorsport N (Italy) Target Competition	Hyundai i30 N TCR	830	(Germany) Moritz Oestreich	1
(South Korea) Hyundai Motorsport N (Italy) Target Competition	Hyundai i30 N TCR	830	(Germany) Guide Naumann	1
(South Korea) Hyundai Motorsport N (Italy) Target Competition	Hyundai i30 N TCR	831	(Italy) Gabriele Tarquini	1
(South Korea) Hyundai Motorsport N (Italy) Target Competition	Hyundai i30 N TCR	831	(Italy) Nicola Larini	1
(South Korea) Hyundai Motorsport N (Italy) Target Competition	Hyundai i30 N TCR	831	(Germany) Manuel Lauck	1
(Switzerland) Garage Rothenberger GmbH	CUPRA León TCR	818	(Switzerland) Sandro Rothenberger	1–2, 4, 6–7
(Switzerland) Garage Rothenberger GmbH	CUPRA León TCR	818	(Switzerland) Edy Kamm	4
(Germany) FEV Racing	CUPRA León TCR	820	(Germany) Benedikt Gentgen	1–9
(Germany) FEV Racing	CUPRA León TCR	820	(Germany) Arndt Hallmanns	1–2
(Germany) FEV Racing	CUPRA León TCR	820	(Germany) "Rennsemmel"	3
(Germany) FEV Racing	CUPRA León TCR	820	(Germany) Marcell Willert	4
(Germany) FEV Racing	CUPRA León TCR	820	(Germany) Martin Pischinger	5-6, 8–9
(Germany) FEV Racing	CUPRA León TCR	820	(Germany) Lukas Thiele	6-7, 9
(Germany) FEV Racing	CUPRA León TCR	820	(Germany) Bernd Hömberg	7
(Germany) Lubner Motorsport	LADA Vesta TCR	821	(Germany) Jens Wulf	3–4
(Germany) Lubner Motorsport	LADA Vesta TCR	821	(Germany) Lukas Thiele	3-4, 8
(Germany) Lubner Motorsport	LADA Vesta TCR	821	(Russia) Andrei Sidorenko	3, 8
(Germany) Lubner Motorsport	Opel Astra TCR	822	(Switzerland) Rudolf Rhyn	1–6
(Germany) Lubner Motorsport	Opel Astra TCR	822	(Austria) Thomas Jäger	1–8
(Germany) Lubner Motorsport	Opel Astra TCR	822	(Germany) Thorsten Wolter	1–8
(Germany) Lubner Motorsport	Opel Astra TCR	822	(Germany) Michael Brüggenkamp	5
(Germany) Lubner Motorsport	Opel Astra TCR	822	(Finland) Hannu Luostarinen	7
(Germany) Lubner Motorsport	Opel Astra TCR	822	(Switzerland) Jasmin Preisig	8
(Germany) Lubner Motorsport	Opel Astra TCR	823	(Germany) Jens Wulf	1–2, 5
(Germany) Lubner Motorsport	Opel Astra TCR	823	(Germany) Lukas Thiele	1–2, 5
(Germany) Lubner Motorsport	Opel Astra TCR	823	(Russia) Andrei Sidorenko	1
(Germany) Lubner Motorsport	Opel Astra TCR	823	(Finland) Ilkka Kariste	2
(Germany) Lubner Motorsport	Honda Civic Type R TCR (FK2)	825	(Switzerland) Roland Schmid	3–4, 6
(Germany) Lubner Motorsport	Honda Civic Type R TCR (FK2)	825	(Switzerland) Roger Vögeli	3–4, 6
(Germany) Lubner Motorsport	Honda Civic Type R TCR (FK2)	825	(Switzerland) Frederic Yerly	3–4, 6
(Germany) Rennworks Racing	CUPRA León TCR	824	(Germany) Armin Eckl	2–3, 5
(Germany) Rennworks Racing	CUPRA León TCR	824	(Germany) Frank Eickholt	2–3
(Germany) Rennworks Racing	CUPRA León TCR	824	(Germany) Peter Terting	2
(Germany) Rennworks Racing	CUPRA León TCR	824	(Germany) Dennis Eckl	3, 5
(Germany) Rennworks Racing	CUPRA León TCR	824	(Germany) Ulrich Andree	5
(Germany) Milltek Sport	CUPRA León TCR	835	(Germany) Moritz Gusenbauer	4–6
(Germany) Milltek Sport	CUPRA León TCR	835	(Germany) Werner Gusenbauer	4–6

=== Calendar and results ===
Rnd.	Circuit	Date	Pole position	Fastest lap	Winning drivers	Winning team
1	Nürburgring Nordschleife	24 March	(Germany) Benedikt Gentgen (Germany) Arndt Hallmanns	(Switzerland) Rudolf Rhyn (Austria) Thomas Jäger (Germany) Thorsten Wolter	(Germany) Benedikt Gentgen (Germany) Arndt Hallmanns	(Germany) FEV Racing
2	Nürburgring Nordschleife	7 April	(Norway) Håkon Schjærin (Norway) Atle Gulbrandsen (Norway) Kenneth Østvold	(Germany) Andreas Gülden	(Germany) Andreas Gülden	(Germany) Mathilda Racing
3	Nürburgring Nordschleife	23 June	(Germany) Andreas Gülden (Germany) Moritz Oestreich	(Germany) Andreas Gülden (Germany) Moritz Oestreich	(Germany) Andreas Gülden (Germany) Moritz Oestreich	(Germany) Mathilda Racing
4	Nürburgring Nordschleife	7 July	(Switzerland) Rudolf Rhyn (Austria) Thomas Jäger (Germany) Thorsten Wolter	(Germany) Benedikt Gentgen (Germany) Marcell Willert	(Germany) Andreas Gülden (Germany) Moritz Oestreich	(Germany) Mathilda Racing
5	Nürburgring Nordschleife	18 August	(Norway) Håkon Schjærin (Norway) Atle Gulbrandsen (Norway) Kenneth Østvold (Norway) Anders Lindstad	(Norway) Håkon Schjærin (Norway) Atle Gulbrandsen (Norway) Kenneth Østvold (Norway) Anders Lindstad	(Norway) Håkon Schjærin (Norway) Atle Gulbrandsen (Norway) Kenneth Østvold (Norway) Anders Lindstad	(Norway) Møller Bil Motorsport
6	Nürburgring Nordschleife	1 September	(Norway) Håkon Schjærin (Norway) Atle Gulbrandsen (Norway) Kenneth Østvold	(Norway) Håkon Schjærin (Norway) Atle Gulbrandsen (Norway) Kenneth Østvold	(Norway) Håkon Schjærin (Norway) Atle Gulbrandsen (Norway) Kenneth Østvold	(Norway) Møller Bil Motorsport
7	Nürburgring Nordschleife	22 September	(Norway) Håkon Schjærin (Norway) Atle Gulbrandsen (Norway) Kenneth Østvold	(Norway) Håkon Schjærin (Norway) Atle Gulbrandsen (Norway) Kenneth Østvold	(Norway) Håkon Schjærin (Norway) Atle Gulbrandsen (Norway) Kenneth Østvold	(Norway) Møller Bil Motorsport
8	Nürburgring Nordschleife	6 October	(Germany) Benedikt Gentgen (Germany) Martin Pischinger	(Germany) Andreas Gülden (Germany) Heiko Hammel	(Germany) Andreas Gülden (Germany) Heiko Hammel	(Germany) Mathilda Racing
9	Nürburgring Nordschleife	20 October	(Germany) Andreas Gülden (Germany) Heiko Hammel	(Norway) Håkon Schjærin (Norway) Atle Gulbrandsen (Norway) Kenneth Østvold	(Germany) Andreas Gülden (Germany) Heiko Hammel	(Germany) Mathilda Racing

== TCR Baltic Trophy ==
The 2018 TCR Baltic Trophy was the second season of the TCR Baltic Trophy. TCR Baltic Trophy was contested within the Baltic Touring Car Championship events.

=== Teams and drivers ===
Team	Car	No.	Drivers	Rounds
(Lithuania) GSR Motorsport	Volkswagen Golf GTI TCR	5	(Lithuania) Ernesta Globytė	1, 3, 4
(Lithuania) Energizer Racing	Volkswagen Golf GTI TCR	95	(Lithuania) Rokas Kvedaras	1

=== Calendar and results ===
The 2018 schedule was announced on 15 March 2018. The calendar includes three rounds in Latvia and two in Estonia all supporting the Baltic Touring Car Championship.

Rnd.		Circuit	Date	Pole position	Fastest lap	Winning driver	Winning team
1	1	(Latvia) Biķernieku Kompleksā Sporta Bāze, Riga	12–13 April	(Lithuania) Ernesta Globytė	(Lithuania) Ernesta Globytė	(Lithuania) Ernesta Globytė	(Lithuania) GSR Motorsport
1	2	(Latvia) Biķernieku Kompleksā Sporta Bāze, Riga	12–13 April		(Lithuania) Ernesta Globytė	(Lithuania) Ernesta Globytė	(Lithuania) GSR Motorsport
2	1	(Latvia) Biķernieku Kompleksā Sporta Bāze, Riga	9–10 June	No drivers entered			
2	2	(Latvia) Biķernieku Kompleksā Sporta Bāze, Riga	9–10 June	No drivers entered			
3	1	(Estonia) Auto24ring, Pärnu	30 June–1 July	(Lithuania) Ernesta Globytė	(Lithuania) Ernesta Globytė	(Lithuania) Ernesta Globytė	(Lithuania) GSR Motorsport
3	2	(Estonia) Auto24ring, Pärnu	30 June–1 July		(Lithuania) Ernesta Globytė	(Lithuania) Ernesta Globytė	(Lithuania) GSR Motorsport
4	1	(Latvia) Biķernieku Kompleksā Sporta Bāze, Riga	18–19 August	(Lithuania) Ernesta Globytė	(Lithuania) Ernesta Globytė	(Lithuania) Ernesta Globytė	(Lithuania) GSR Motorsport
4	2	(Latvia) Biķernieku Kompleksā Sporta Bāze, Riga	18–19 August		(Lithuania) Ernesta Globytė	(Lithuania) Ernesta Globytė	(Lithuania) GSR Motorsport
5	1	(Estonia) Auto24ring, Pärnu	22–23 September	(Lithuania) Ernesta Globytė	(Lithuania) Ernesta Globytė	(Lithuania) Ernesta Globytė	(Lithuania) GSR Motorsport
5	2	(Estonia) Auto24ring, Pärnu	22–23 September		(Lithuania) Ernesta Globytė	(Lithuania) Ernesta Globytė	(Lithuania) GSR Motorsport

=== Championship standings ===
Pos.	Driver	(Latvia) BIĶ		(Latvia) BIĶ	(Estonia) PÄR		(Latvia) BIĶ		(Estonia) PÄR		Pts.
1	(Lithuania) Ernesta Globytė	**1**	**1**		**1**	**1**	**1**	**1**	**1**	**1**	200
–	(Lithuania) Rokas Kvedaras	DNS	DNS								-
Pos.	Driver	(Latvia) BIĶ		(Latvia) BIĶ	(Estonia) PÄR		(Latvia) BIĶ		(Estonia) PÄR		Pts.

Colour	Result
Gold	Winner
Silver	Second place
Bronze	Third place
Green	Points classification
Blue	Non-points classification
Blue	Non-classified finish (NC)
Purple	Retired, not classified (Ret)
Red	Did not qualify (DNQ)
Red	Did not pre-qualify (DNPQ)
Black	Disqualified (DSQ)
White	Did not start (DNS)
White	Withdrew (WD)
White	Race cancelled (C)
Blank	Did not practice (DNP)
Blank	Did not arrive (DNA)
Blank	Excluded (EX)

**Bold** – Pole
Italics – Fastest Lap

== TCR Swiss Trophy ==
TCR Swiss Trophy was an event, organized by Auto Sport Switzerland and was the inaugural season. The calendar consisted of 5 events from TCR Europe, TCR BeNeLux, ADAC TCR Germany and TCR Italy.

=== Calendar and results ===
Rnd.		Circuit	Date	Pole position	Fastest lap	Winning driver	Winning team	Supporting
1	1	(Italy) Autodromo Enzo e Dino Ferrari, Imola	29 April	(Italy) Eric Scalvini	(Italy) Luigi Ferrara	(Italy) Luigi Ferrara	(Switzerland) 42 Racing SA	TCR Italy Touring Car Championship; Italian GT Championship; Italian Formula 4 Championship
1	2	(Italy) Autodromo Enzo e Dino Ferrari, Imola	29 April		(Italy) Nicola Baldan	(Italy) Luigi Ferrara	(Switzerland) 42 Racing SA	TCR Italy Touring Car Championship; Italian GT Championship; Italian Formula 4 Championship
2	3	(Netherlands) Circuit Park Zandvoort, Zandvoort	21 May	(Netherlands) Jaap van Lagen	(Spain) Mikel Azcona	(Spain) Mikel Azcona	(Spain) PCR Sport	World Touring Car Cup; TCR Europe Series; TCR Benelux Touring Car Championship
2	4	(Netherlands) Circuit Park Zandvoort, Zandvoort	21 May		(Netherlands) Jaap van Lagen	(United Kingdom) Josh Files	(Hong Kong) Hell Energy Racing with KCMG	World Touring Car Cup; TCR Europe Series; TCR Benelux Touring Car Championship
3	5	(Austria) Red Bull Ring, Spielberg	10 June	(Netherlands) Niels Langeveld	(Netherlands) Niels Langeveld	(Netherlands) Niels Langeveld	(Germany) RacingOne	ADAC TCR Germany Touring Car Championship; ADAC GT Masters; ADAC Formula 4 Championship
3	6	(Austria) Red Bull Ring, Spielberg	10 June		(Finland) Antti Buri	(Austria) Harald Proczyk	(Austria) HP Racing International	ADAC TCR Germany Touring Car Championship; ADAC GT Masters; ADAC Formula 4 Championship
4	7	TT Circuit Assen, Assen, Netherlands	19 August	(United Kingdom) Josh Files	(Hungary) Dániel Nagy	(Hungary) Dániel Nagy	(Hungary) M1RA	TCR Europe Series; TCR Benelux Touring Car Championship
4	8	TT Circuit Assen, Assen, Netherlands	19 August		(Hungary) Attila Tassi	(Hungary) Attila Tassi	(Hong Kong) Hell Energy Racing with KCMG	TCR Europe Series; TCR Benelux Touring Car Championship
5	9	Autodromo Nazionale Monza, Monza, Italy	23 September	(France) Jean-Karl Vernay	(France) Jean-Karl Vernay	(France) Jean-Karl Vernay	(Luxembourg) Leopard Lukoil Team WRT	TCR Europe Series; International GT Open; Euroformula Open
5	10	Autodromo Nazionale Monza, Monza, Italy	23 September		(France) Jean-Karl Vernay	(France) Jean-Karl Vernay	(Luxembourg) Leopard Lukoil Team WRT	TCR Europe Series; International GT Open; Euroformula Open

=== Championship standings ===
Pos.	Driver	(Italy) IMO		(Netherlands) ZAN		(Austria) RBR		(Netherlands) ASS		(Italy) MNZ		Pts.
1	(Hungary) Attila Tassi			2	3			5	1	5	3	93
2	(Spain) Mikel Azcona			1	6			9	2	2	5	81
3	(France) Jean-Karl Vernay							2	7	**1**	1	74
4	(United Kingdom) Josh Files			**5**	1			**10**	Ret	3	2	71
5	(Italy) Luigi Ferrara	1	1									50
6	(Switzerland) Kris Richard			14	5			3	6	12	7	39
7	(Finland) Antti Buri					2	2					36
8	(Belgium) Maxime Potty			Ret	10			7	8	4	4	35
8	(Austria) Harald Proczyk					5	1					35
9	(Italy) Enrico Bettera	3	2									33
9	(Serbia) Dušan Borković			5	18			6	3	DSQ	DSQ	33
9	(Netherlands) Jaap van Lagen			**3**	2							33
13	(Switzerland) Stefano Comini							4	4	6	Ret	32
14	(Hungary) Dániel Nagy			7	11			1	Ret	Ret	12	31
15	(Germany) Benjamin Leuchter					3	3					30
16	(Netherlands) Niels Langeveld					**1**	8					29
17	(Italy) Andrea Larini	5	3									25
18	(Norway) Stian Paulsen			6	Ret			8	5	9	Ret	24
19	(Portugal) José Rodrigues	4	6									20
20	(Germany) Luca Engstler					7	4					18
20	(Italy) Salvatore Tavano	2								Ret	13	18
22	(Netherlands) Danny Kroes			8	4			12	Ret	Ret	20	16
22	(Germany) Luke Wankmüller					6	6					16
24	(Italy) Matteo Greco		4									12
24	(Germany) Mike Halder					4	Ret					12
24	(Germany) Peter Terting							21†	12	8	6	12
24	(Switzerland) Florian Thoma					9	5					12
28	(Italy) Giovanni Altoè	8	7					18	16	18	18	10
28	(Italy) Nicola Baldan	15	5							11	17	10
28	(Italy) Fabrizio Giovanardi									7	8	10
28	(Germany) Max Hesse					8	7					10
32	(Denmark) Jens Reno Møller			10	7			13	9	17	Ret	9
33	(Italy) Lorenzo Nicoli	6	18									8
34	(Portugal) Francisco Mora			9	8							6
34	(Austria) Jürgen Schmarl	7	14									6
36	(Italy) Massimiliano Mugelli	10	8									5
37	(Republic of Ireland) Reece Barr			Ret	DNS			11	10	16	9	3
38	(Portugal) Francisco Abreu			11	9			15	DSQ	13	21	2
38	(Germany) Sandro Kaibach					13	9					2
38	(Bulgaria) Plamen Kralev	19	9									2
38	(Italy) Francesco Savoia	9	12									2
38	(United Kingdom) Oliver Taylor									10	10	2
43	(Austria) Lukas Niedertscheider					Ret	10					1
43	(Italy) Marco Pellegrini	Ret	10									1
43	(Austria) Simon Reicher					10	11					1
–	(Italy) Federico Paolino	16	11									-
–	(Germany) Kai Jordan					11	18					-
–	(Austria) Massimiliano Gagliano	11	22									-
–	(France) Julien Briché			Ret	Ret			14	11			-
–	(Argentina) José Manuel Sapag									Ret	11	-
–	(Italy) Ermanno Dionisio	12	13									-
–	(Hungary) Márk Jedlóczky			12	13							-
–	(Luxembourg) Loris Cencetti			13	12			Ret	13			-
–	(Germany) Dominik Fugel					17	12					-
–	(Germany) Dino Calcum					12	Ret					-
–	(Italy) Matteo Bergonzini	13	15									-
–	(Germany) Michelle Halder					15	13					-
–	(Switzerland) Oliver Holdener					14	14					-
–	(Italy) Adriano Bernazzani	14										-
–	(Germany) Cedric Piro			17	14							-
–	(North Macedonia) Viktor Davidovski			15	15			17	14	19	16	-
–	(North Macedonia) Igor Stefanovski			Ret	16			16	Ret	14	15	-
–	(Slovakia) Martin Ryba			16	19					15	14	-
–	(Austria) Günter Benninger	15	21									-
–	(Germany) Loris Prattes					Ret	15					-
–	(Thailand) Munkong Sathienthirakul							20†	15			-
–	(Finland) Niko Kankkunen					16	20					-
–	(Italy) Davide Nardilli	Ret	16									-
–	(Germany) Justin Häußermann					Ret	16					-
–	(Switzerland) Jasmin Preisig					23	17					-
–	(Austria) Peter Gross	Ret	17									-
–	(France) Marie Baus-Coppens			Ret	17			19	17			-
–	(Italy) Cosimo Papi	18										-
–	(France) Théo Coicaud					18	Ret					-
–	(Germany) Marcel Fugel					19	19					-
–	(Switzerland) Raimondo Ricci		19									-
–	(Italy) Daniele Cappellari									21	19	-
–	(Germany) Jan Seyffert					20	21					-
–	(Italy) Eric Scalvini	**20**	23†									-
–	(Italy) Gabriele Volpato		20									-
–	(Italy) Roberto Russo									20	Ret	-
–	(Austria) "Tessitore"					21	23					-
–	(Italy) Andrea Argenti	21	24†									-
–	(United States) J.C. Reynolds					22	Ret					-
–	(Germany) Daniel Davidovac					Ret	22					-
–	(Germany) Sebastian Steibel					Ret	23					-
–	(Italy) Alessandro Thellung	Ret	Ret									-
–	(Finland) Jussi Kuusiniemi					Ret	Ret					-
–	(Belgium) Benjamin Lessennes									Ret	Ret	-
–	(Italy) Cosimo Barberini									Ret	Ret	-
–	(Italy) Walter Margelli	Ret	DNS									-
–	(Switzerland) Milenko Vuković					DNS	DNS					-
Pos.	Driver	(Italy) IMO		(Netherlands) ZAN		(Austria) RBR		(Netherlands) ASS		(Italy) MNZ		Pts.

Colour	Result
Gold	Winner
Silver	Second place
Bronze	Third place
Green	Points classification
Blue	Non-points classification
Blue	Non-classified finish (NC)
Purple	Retired, not classified (Ret)
Red	Did not qualify (DNQ)
Red	Did not pre-qualify (DNPQ)
Black	Disqualified (DSQ)
White	Did not start (DNS)
White	Withdrew (WD)
White	Race cancelled (C)
Blank	Did not practice (DNP)
Blank	Did not arrive (DNA)
Blank	Excluded (EX)

**Bold** – Pole
Italics – Fastest Lap

† – Drivers did not finish the race, but were classified as they completed over 75% of the race distance.

== TCR Ibérico Touring Car Series ==
The 2018 TCR Ibérico Touring Car Series season was the second season of the TCR Ibérico Touring Car Series. The championship started at Circuito Internacional de Vila Real in Portugal on 23 June and ended at Circuit de Barcelona-Catalunya in Spain on 21 October.

=== Calendar and results ===
Rnd.		Circuit	Date	Pole position	Fastest lap	Winning driver	Winning team	Supporting
1	1	Circuito Internacional de Vila Real, Vila Real, Portugal	23 June	(Portugal) Pedro Salvador	(Portugal) Pedro Salvador	(Portugal) Pedro Salvador	(Portugal) Speedy Motorsport	World Touring Car Cup; Campeonato Nacional de Velocidade Turismos
1	2	Circuito Internacional de Vila Real, Vila Real, Portugal	24 June		(Portugal) Pedro Salvador	(Portugal) Pedro Salvador	(Portugal) Speedy Motorsport	World Touring Car Cup; Campeonato Nacional de Velocidade Turismos
2	3	Circuit de Barcelona-Catalunya, Montmeló, Spain	20 October	(Hungary) Attila Tassi	(France) Jean-Karl Vernay	(Hungary) Attila Tassi	(Hong Kong) Hell Energy Racing with KCMG	TCR Europe Series; TCR Benelux Touring Car Championship
2	4	Circuit de Barcelona-Catalunya, Montmeló, Spain	21 October		(United Kingdom) Ashley Sutton	(Germany) Mike Halder	(Hong Kong) Hell Energy Racing with KCMG	TCR Europe Series; TCR Benelux Touring Car Championship

=== Championship standings ===
Pos.	Driver	(Portugal) VIL		(Spain) BAR		Pts.
Pos.	Driver	RD1	RD2	RD1	RD2	Pts.
1	(Portugal) Pedro Salvador	**1**	**1**			27
2	(Hungary) Attila Tassi			**1**	Ret	26
3	(Germany) Mike Halder			Ret	1	25
4	(Portugal) Rafael Lobato	2				20
5	(Portugal) Francisco Carvalho	4	2			20
6	(Hungary) Dániel Nagy			7	2	20
7	(Serbia) Dušan Borković			2	Ret	20
8	(United Kingdom) Ashley Sutton			4	3	18
9	(Portugal) Armando Parente	3				17
9	(Portugal) Francisco Abreu		3	Ret	12	17
11	(Hungary) Norbert Michelisz			3	4	17
12	(Portugal) Manuel Gião	5	4			14
13	(Portugal) Gustavo Moura		5			12
14	(Spain) Mikel Azcona			5	8	12
15	(Germany) Peter Terting			10	5	12
16	(France) Jean-Karl Vernay			6	7	11
17	(United Kingdom) Josh Files			24	6	10
18	(France) Julien Briché			8	22	6
19	(Republic of Ireland) Reece Barr			9	10	4
20	(Norway) Stian Paulsen			11	9	4
21	(Switzerland) Stefano Comini			Ret	11	0
22	(Sweden) Andreas Bäckman			12	13	0
23	(United Kingdom) Oliver Taylor			13	17	0
24	(Sweden) Jessica Bäckman			15	14	0
25	(Belgium) Maxime Potty			14	16	0
26	(North Macedonia) Viktor Davidovski			16	15	0
27	(Slovakia) Martin Ryba			17	19	0
28	(Spain) Enrique Hernando			19	18	0
29	(Thailand) Munkong Sathienthirakul			18	Ret	0
30	(France) Marie Baus-Coppens			21	20	0
31	(Czech Republic) Petr Fulín			20	23	0
32	(Serbia) Nikola Miljković			DNS	21	0
33	(France) Jean-Laurent Navarro			22	Ret	0
34	(Russia) Klim Gavrilov			23	Ret	0
35	(Denmark) Jens Reno Møller			25	Ret	–
–	(France) Nathanaël Berthon			Ret	Ret	–
–	(Netherlands) Danny Kroes			Ret	Ret	–
–	(Switzerland) Kris Richard			DSQ	EX	–
Pos.	Driver	(Portugal) VIL		(Spain) BAR		Pts.

Colour	Result
Gold	Winner
Silver	Second place
Bronze	Third place
Green	Points classification
Blue	Non-points classification
Blue	Non-classified finish (NC)
Purple	Retired, not classified (Ret)
Red	Did not qualify (DNQ)
Red	Did not pre-qualify (DNPQ)
Black	Disqualified (DSQ)
White	Did not start (DNS)
White	Withdrew (WD)
White	Race cancelled (C)
Blank	Did not practice (DNP)
Blank	Did not arrive (DNA)
Blank	Excluded (EX)

**Bold** – Pole
Italics – Fastest Lap

† – Drivers did not finish the race, but were classified as they completed over 75% of the race distance.
