= L'Enfer =

L'Enfer or Enfer is French for Hell.

It may refer to:

== Film ==
- Henri-Georges Clouzot's Inferno or Hell (L'Enfer), an unfinished French film by Henri-Georges Clouzot
- Hell (1994 film) (L'Enfer), a French film directed by Claude Chabrol, adapted from Clouzot's 1964 film
- Hell (2005 film) (L'Enfer), a French film directed by Danis Tanović

== Music ==
- Enfer (De La Bibliothèque Nationale), a 2014 album by the Italian heavy metal band Mastercastle
- "L'enfer" (song), a 2022 song by the Belgian singer-songwriter Stromae

== Print media ==
- Hell (Barbusse novel) (L'Enfer), a 1908 novel by Henri Barbusse
- L'Enfer (comic book), a 2025 comic book by Nicolas Badout, adapted from Clouzot's 1964 film

== Other uses ==
- Cabaret de L'Enfer, a cabaret in Paris, active in 1892-1950
- Collection de l'Enfer, a restricted department of the Bibliothèque nationale de France

== See also ==
- Hell (disambiguation)
- Inferno
- Les Enfers
