= Halle =

Halle may refer to:

== Places ==
=== Germany ===
- Halle (Saale), or Halle an der Saale, Saxony-Anhalt
  - Halle (electoral district)
  - Halle (region), a governmental district 1952–2004
  - Bezirk Halle, a district 1952–1990
  - Halle-Neustadt, a former city
  - Halle concentration camp, a subcamp of Buchenwald concentration camp
- Halle (Westfalen), North Rhine-Westphalia
- Halle, Bentheim, Lower Saxony
- Halle, Holzminden, Lower Saxony
- Halle (Heve), a river of North Rhine-Westphalia
- Halle Gate, one of the Leipzig City Gates, Germany

=== Elsewhere ===
- Halle, Belgium
- Halle, Netherlands
- Halle Gate, a former medieval city gate in Brussels, Belgium
- Halle Range, a mountain range in Greenland

== Music ==
- The Hallé, an orchestra based in Manchester, England
- Halle (album), by Casiopea, 1985

== Other uses ==
- Halle (name), a given name and a surname, including a list of people with the name
- Halle, one of the fireboats of Duluth, Minnesota, U.S.
- Halle Brothers Co., or Halle's, a defunct department store chain
  - Halle Building, in Cleveland, Ohio, U.S.

== See also ==
- Hall (disambiguation)
- Halla (disambiguation)
- Halley (disambiguation)
- Hallie (disambiguation)
- Hel (disambiguation)
- Hell (disambiguation)
- Helle (disambiguation)
- Battle of Halle, at Halle, Saxony-Anhalt, in 1806
- Hallesches Tor, a former city gate and U-Bahn station in Berlin, Germany
- Martin Luther University Halle-Wittenberg, Germany
- Halle Open, a men's tennis tournament
- Halle Trophy Race, an air race for women aviators
