= La Prisonnière (film) =

1968 film by Henri-Georges Clouzot

- Theatrical release poster
- Directed by: Henri-Georges Clouzot
- Written by: Henri-Georges Clouzot; Monique Lange (Note: Collaboration); Marcel Moussy
- Produced by: Robert Dorfmann
- Starring: Laurent Terzieff; Élisabeth Wiener; Bernard Fresson; Dany Carrel; Michel Piccoli; Darío Moreno
- Cinematography: Andréas Winding
- Edited by: Noëlle Balenci
- Music by: Gilbert Amy; Anton Webern; Gustav Mahler; Iannis Xenakis
- Production companies: Fono Roma; Les Films Corona
- Distributed by: Valoria Films (France); Euro International Films (Italy)
- Release dates: 20 November 1968 (France); 20 September 1969 (Italy)
- Running time: 101 minutes
- Countries: France; Italy
- Language: French

La Prisonnière (also known as Woman in Chains) is a 1968 drama film written and directed by Henri-Georges Clouzot. It follows an attractive young woman living with an avant-garde artist who falls disastrously for the voyeuristic owner of the gallery that shows her husband's work. Clouzot's only film completed in colour, it was the last of his career.

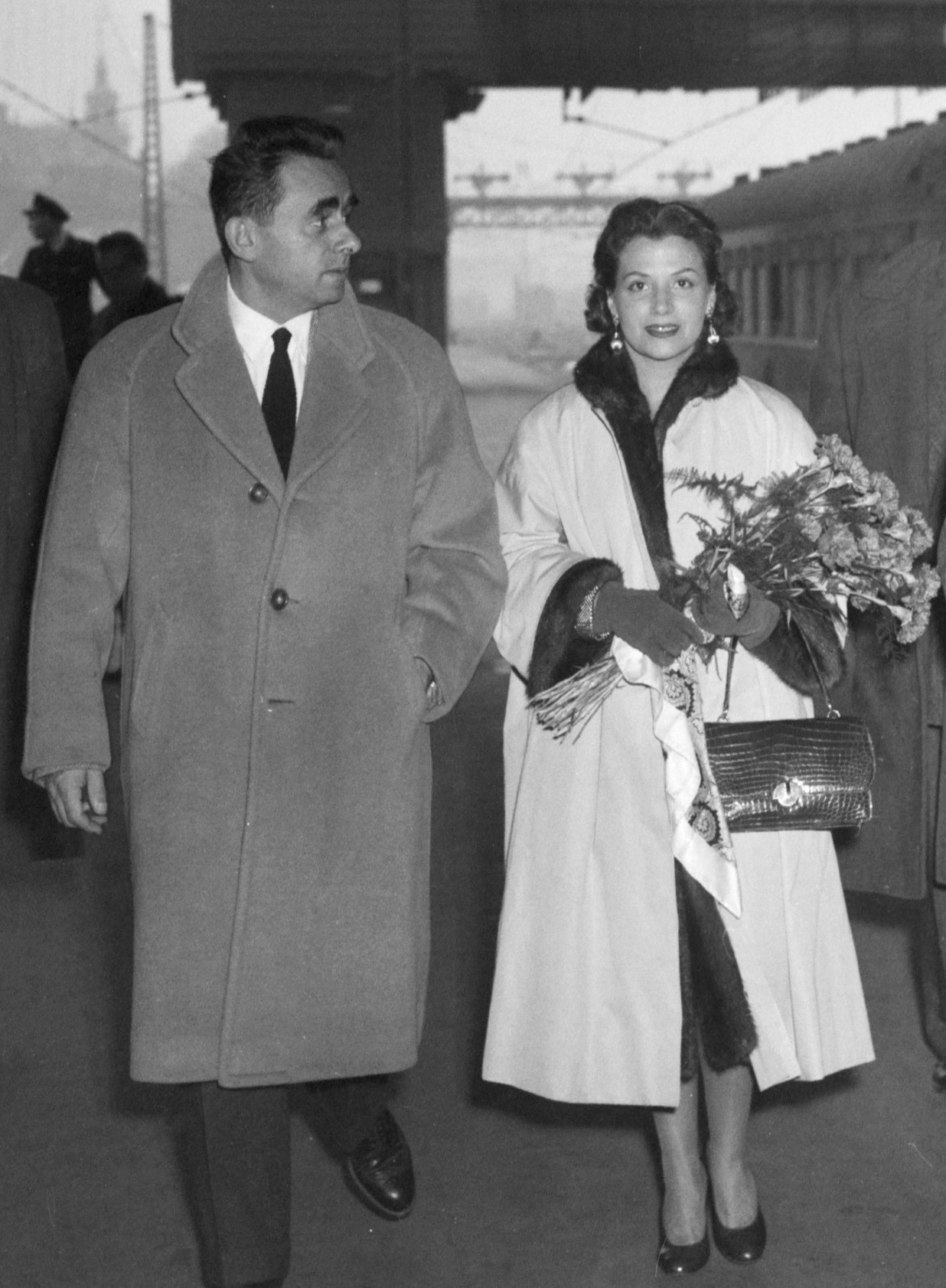
Clouzot and his wife Vera

== Plot ==
Stanislas, a wealthy unmarried owner of an art gallery in Paris, is friend and patron to Gilbert, a creator of progressive artworks, who lives in a little suburban flat with José, a television editor. At the opening night of an exhibition, Gilbert goes off with an attractive young woman who is an influential critic.

Left alone, José goes back with Stanislas to his luxurious flat, where he shows her a photograph he had taken of a naked woman in bondage. Though she is shocked and leaves, the allure of Stanislas and of his pornographic image works in her mind until one day she asks him if she can sit in on a photo session. Finding herself increasingly excited by the rising erotic tension of the shoot and by the sexiness of the pretty young model, José angers Stanislas by leaving in confusion. The two make it up, however, and José starts posing for him, but she wants more than this artificial connection.

Gilbert, unhappy with her unexplained absences, goes on a business trip to Germany, and José and Stanislas travel together to an inn in Brittany. After a night together, Stanislas has second thoughts and abandons her there. Deeply hurt at this behaviour, José tells all to Gilbert on his return. He rushes off to Stanislas' flat, intending to kill him, but the two reach a sort of reconciliation. Following in her own car, José shoots a level crossing and is hit by a train. Coming out of her coma in hospital, she thinks that Gilbert, waiting by the bedside, is Stanislas come to reclaim her.

== Cast ==
- Laurent Terzieff as Stanislas, an art gallery owner
- Élisabeth Wiener as José, Gilbert's partner
- Bernard Fresson as Gilbert, an avant-garde artist
- Dany Carrel as Maguy, Stanislas' model
- Claude Piéplu as José's father
- Noëlle Adam as José's mother
- Darío Moreno as Sala, Stanislas' butler and driver
- Michel Piccoli as a guest at the gallery
- Charles Vanel as a guest at the gallery
- Joanna Shimkus as a guest at the gallery
- Jackie Sardou as the cashier

== Themes ==
The film is close in theme to some other pictures of the time. Both Michelangelo Antonioni's Blowup (1966) and Michael Powell's Peeping Tom (1960) explored the dark links between men who make erotic images of women, films about such men and their models, and the viewers of such films, while Luis Buñuel's Belle de Jour (1967) acted out the sadomasochistic fantasies of a beautiful middle-class woman. Contemporary also are its visual elements of pop and psychedelic art, including a striking dream sequence reminiscent of Stanley Kubrick's 2001: A Space Odyssey (1968); similar use of these elements can be found in Clouzot's aborted earlier film L'Enfer.

== Reception ==
Review sites surveyed on 17 February 2016 give ratings of 67% at SensCritique and 72% at AlloCiné.
