= Helle =

Helle may refer to:

== People ==
- Helle (name)
- Alternate spelling of George de La Hèle, Renaissance composer

== Places ==
=== Belgium ===
- Helle (stream), a stream that rises in the Eifel mountains

=== Denmark ===
- Helle Municipality, a former municipality in the Southern Region

=== Germany ===
- Helle, a part of the town of Balve in Märkischer Kreis, North Rhine-Westphalia
- Helle (Orke), a river of North Rhine-Westphalia
- Helle (Spüligbach), a river of Lower Saxony

=== Netherlands ===
- Helle, Beekdaelen, a hamlet in the province of Limburg
- Helle, Gulpen-Wittem, a hamlet in the province of Limburg

=== Norway ===
- Helle, Agder, a village in Flekkefjord Municipality, near Konsmo
- Helle, Møre og Romsdal, a village in Ålesund Municipality, Møre og Romsdal county
- Helle, Sunnfjord, a village in Sunnfjord Municipality, Vestland county
- Helle, Telemark, a village in Kragerø municipality, Telemark county
- Helle, Vaksdal, a village in Vaksdal Municipality, Vestland county

== Other ==
- Helle (mythology), a figure in Greek mythology after whom the Hellespont is named
- Hellé, a 1779 opera by Floquet
- Hellé (film), a 1972 film directed by Roger Vadim
- Helle (fly), a genus of small-headed flies endemic to New Zealand
- Helle, a knife company in Askvoll, Vestland county, Norway

== See also ==
- Hall (disambiguation)
- Halle (disambiguation)
- Hel (disambiguation)
- Hell (disambiguation)
