= Hall (disambiguation) =

Hall is an architectural term which evolved from referring to a relatively large space enclosed by a roof and walls to multiple types of architectural spaces. Hall can also mean:

== Architectural spaces and related, broader meanings ==
- Hall (concept), for the development of the meaning of the word
- Hall, a name for a large house
- Great hall
- Hall and parlor house
- Hallway
- Mead hall
- Hall, short for Residence Hall

== People and fictional characters ==
- Hall (surname), including a list of people and fictional characters
- Hall (given name), a list of people

== Places ==
=== Australia ===
- Hall (district), Australian Capital District
  - Hall, Australian Capital District, a town in the district

=== Austria ===
- Hall bei Admont, a municipality in Styria
- Hall in Tirol, a city in the state of Tyrol

=== England ===
- Hall, Bishop's Tawton, Devon, an historic estate
- Hall, Lanteglos-by-Fowey, Cornwall, an historic estate

=== United States ===
- Las Lomas, California, formerly Hall
- Hall, Indiana, an unincorporated community
- Hall, Montana, an unincorporated community
- Hall, New York, a hamlet and census-designated place
- Hall, Texas, an unincorporated community
- Hall, Washington, an unincorporated community
- Hall, West Virginia, an unincorporated community
- Hall County (disambiguation)
- Hall Island (Alaska)
- Fort Hall, a fur trading post in Oregon Country, now part of Idaho

=== Elsewhere on Earth ===
- Hall Island (Arctic), in the Franz Josef Land archipelago
- Hall Land, Greenland, Denmark
- Schwäbisch Hall, formerly known as Hall, a town in Baden-Württemberg, Germany
- Hall, County Westmeath, Ireland, a townland in Kilcleagh civil parish
- Hall (Gelderland), a village in the Netherlands
- Hall, East Renfrewshire, Scotland, a hamlet
- Hall, Gotland, Sweden, a socken and district on the island of Gotland

=== Extraterrestrial ===
- Hall (lunar crater), on the Moon
- Hall, a crater on Phobos (moon)

== Locomotives ==
- GWR 4900 Class, known as "Hall Class", a type of steam locomotive
- GWR 6959 Class, known as "Modified Hall Class", based on the Hall Class

== Schools ==
- Hall High School (Arkansas), in Little Rock
- Hall High School (Connecticut), in West Hartford
- The Hall School, Hampstead, London, a boy's preparatory school

== Other uses ==
- Hall Prison, a high-security prison near Södertälje, Sweden
- The Hall, Thornton-le-Dale, historic building in England
- Hall.com, a Hall, Inc. online enterprise communications platform
- USS Hall, various United States Navy ships
- M1819 Hall rifle, a single-shot breech-loading rifle adopted by the United States Army in 1819
- Hall (film), a 2020 Canadian horror film
- HALL, ICAO code for Lalibela Airport, Lalibela, Amhara Region, Ethiopia

== See also ==
- Hall effect, the production of a voltage difference (the Hall voltage) across an electrical conductor
- Hall theorem, also known as Hall's Marriage Theorem, a mathematical theorem
- Halle (disambiguation)
- Halls (disambiguation)
