= Hell on Earth =

Hell on Earth may refer to:

== Film and television ==
- Hell on Earth (film), a 1931 German war film directed by Victor Trivas
- Hell on Earth, a 2007 television film featuring Kyla Pratt
- Hell on Earth, a 2008 film directed by Ted A. Bohus
- Hell on Earth, a documentary presented by Mark Kermode about the film The Devils
- Hellraiser III: Hell on Earth, a 1992 horror film
- "Hell on Earth" (Smash), an episode of Smash
- "Hell on Earth 2006", an episode of South Park

== Games ==
- Doom II: Hell on Earth, the sequel to Doom
- Deadlands: Hell on Earth, an alternate-history role-playing game
- "Hell on Earth", a level of Doom Eternal

== Literature ==
- Hell on Earth (book series), a dark paranormal novel series by Jackie Kessler
- Hell on Earth, a 1985 DC Graphic Novel by Robert Bloch et al.
- B.P.R.D. Hell on Earth, a story cycle in Mike Mignola's B.P.R.D. comics series

== Music ==
- Hell on Earth (band), an American industrial-metal band
- Hell on Earth Tour, a 2009 metal music tour that included Earth Crisis

=== Albums ===
- Hell on Earth (Mobb Deep album) or the title song (see below), 1996
- Hell on Earth: A Tribute to the Misfits, 2000
- Hell on Earth, by Toxic Holocaust, 2005
- Hell on Earth, an EP by Fit for an Autopsy, 2009
- Hell on Earth, a series of DVDs by Manowar, 2000–2005

=== Songs ===
- "Front Lines (Hell on Earth)", by Mobb Deep, 1996
- "Hell on Earth", by Iron Maiden from Senjutsu, 2021

== Places ==
- Andkhoy (city), Afghanistan, described by Persians as "a Hell upon Earth"

== See also ==
- Hell (disambiguation)
