= Edith Hall (disambiguation) =

Edith Hall may refer to:

== People ==
- Edith Hall (born 1959), British classics scholar and Professor at King's College London
- Edith Hall Dohan (1877–1943), American archaeologist

== Other uses ==
- St Edith Hall, Kemsing, Kent, UK

== See also ==
- Edith
- Hall (disambiguation)
