= Helledie =

Helledie is a surname. Notable people with the surname include:

- Jesper Helledie (born 1954), Danish badminton player
- Steffen Holme Helledie (born 1989), Danish politician

== See also ==
- Helle
- Die
