= 2018 TCR Europe Touring Car Series =

European motorsport championship

The 2018 TCR Europe Touring Car Series was the third holding of TCR Europe, and first held as a standalone series. The series began at the Circuit Paul Ricard in May and ended at the Circuit de Barcelona-Catalunya in October.

As part of a deal with the series' promoters, at five of the seven events, the 2018 TCR BeNeLux Touring Car Championship series was held which was its third edition.

TCR Europe Series also saw the introduction of the DSG Challenge for cars equipped with Direct-shift gearbox.

== Calendar ==
Rnd.		Circuit/Location	Date	Supporting
1	1	Circuit Paul Ricard, Le Castellet, France	5 May	International GT Open; Euroformula Open
1	2	Circuit Paul Ricard, Le Castellet, France	6 May	International GT Open; Euroformula Open
2	3	Circuit Zandvoort, Zandvoort, Netherlands	20 May	World Touring Car Cup; TCR Swiss Trophy
2	4	Circuit Zandvoort, Zandvoort, Netherlands	21 May	World Touring Car Cup; TCR Swiss Trophy
3	5	Circuit de Spa-Francorchamps, Stavelot, Belgium	9 June	International GT Open; Euroformula Open
3	6	Circuit de Spa-Francorchamps, Stavelot, Belgium	10 June	International GT Open; Euroformula Open
4	7	Hungaroring, Budapest, Hungary	7 July	International GT Open; Euroformula Open
4	8	Hungaroring, Budapest, Hungary	8 July	International GT Open; Euroformula Open
5	9	TT Circuit Assen, Assen, Netherlands	18 August	TCR Swiss Trophy
5	10	TT Circuit Assen, Assen, Netherlands	19 August	TCR Swiss Trophy
6	11	Autodromo Nazionale Monza, Monza, Italy	22 September	International GT Open; Euroformula Open; TCR Swiss Trophy
6	12	Autodromo Nazionale Monza, Monza, Italy	23 September	International GT Open; Euroformula Open; TCR Swiss Trophy
7	13	Circuit de Barcelona-Catalunya, Montmeló, Spain	20 October	International GT Open; Euroformula Open
7	14	Circuit de Barcelona-Catalunya, Montmeló, Spain	21 October	International GT Open; Euroformula Open

Race also part of the 2018 TCR BeNeLux season

== Teams and drivers ==
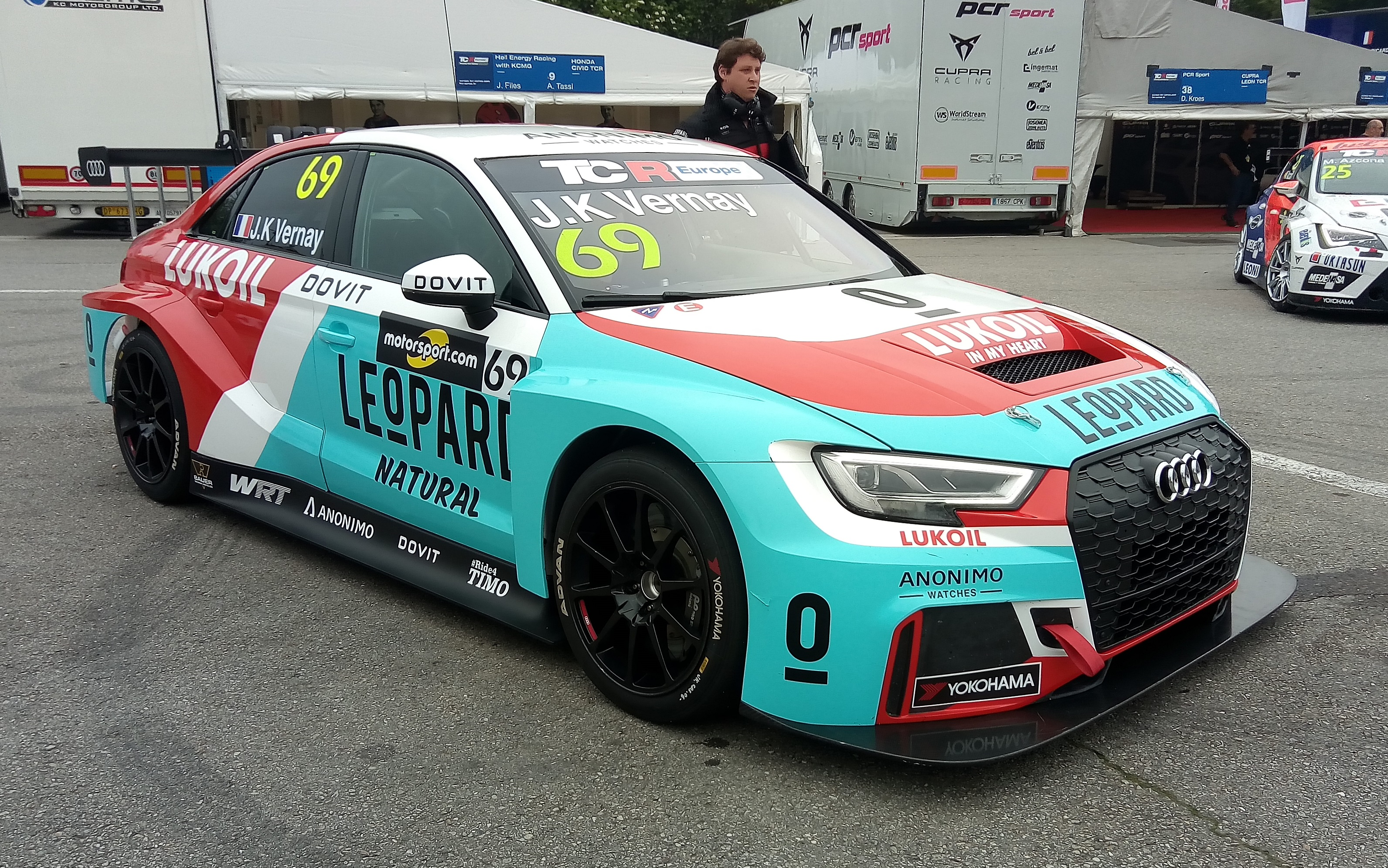
The Leopard Lukoil Team WRT Audi RS3 LMS TCR, driven by Jean-Karl Vernay.

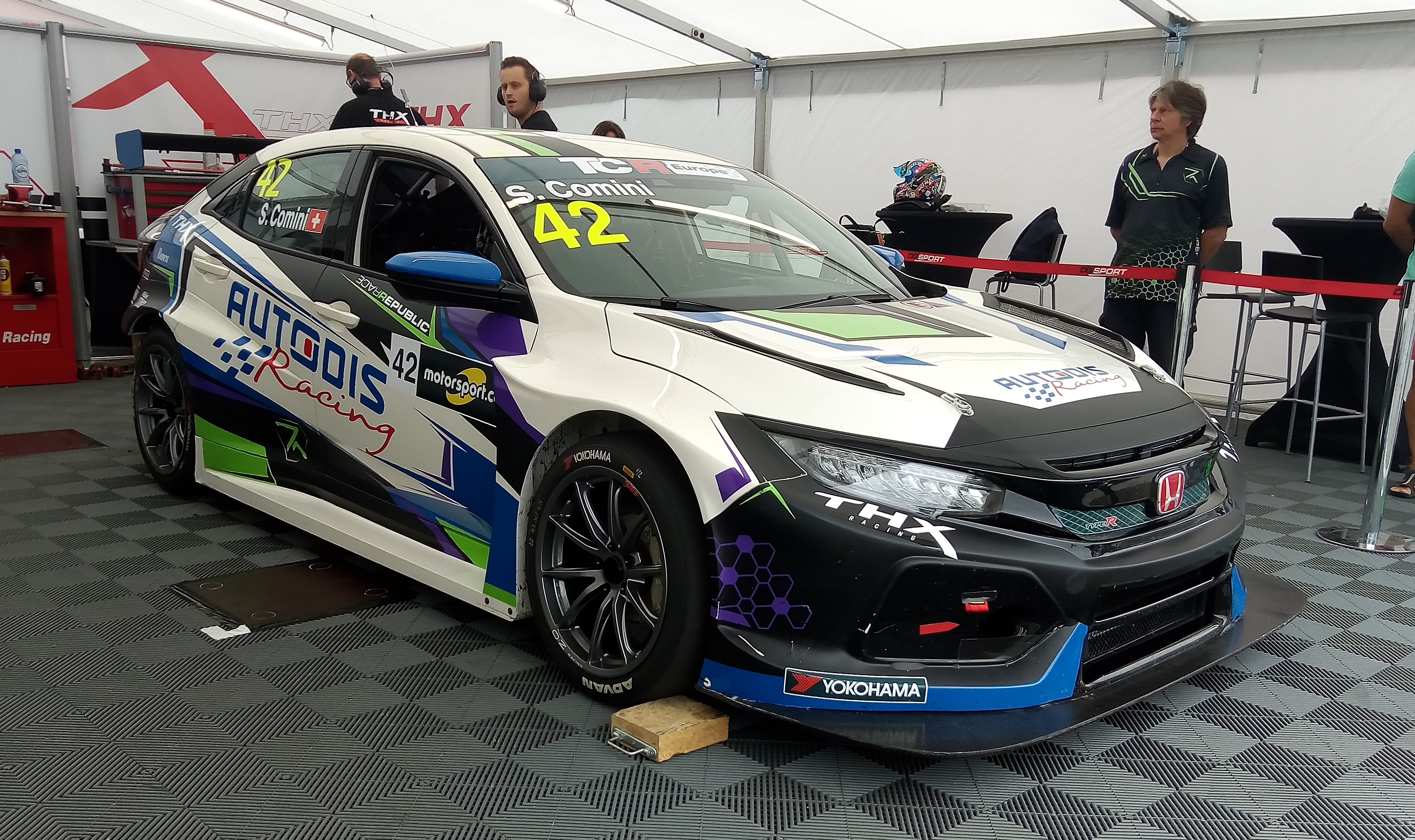
The Autodis Racing by THX Honda Civic Type R TCR (FK8), driven by Stefano Comini.

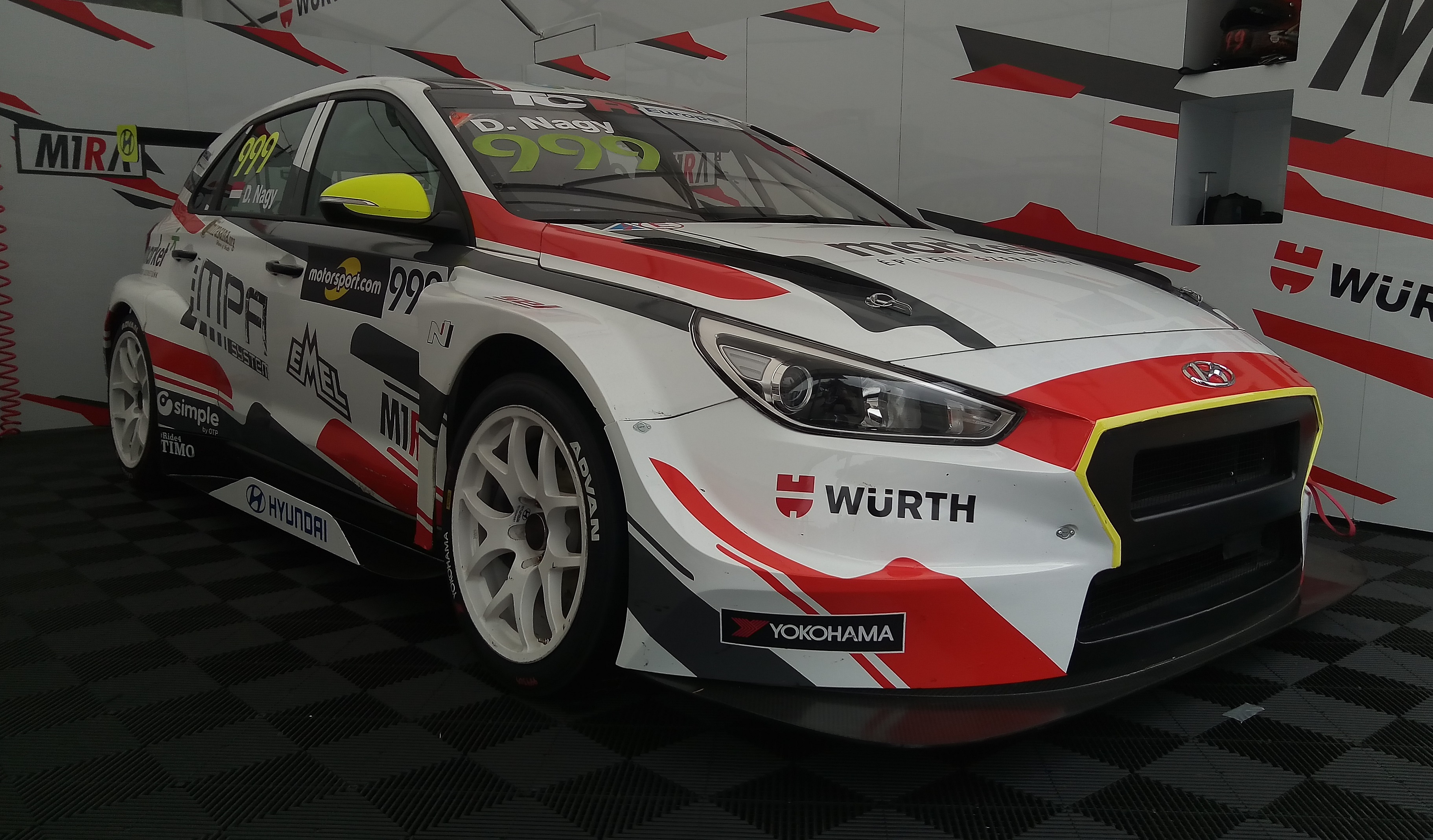
The M1RA Hyundai i30 N TCR, driven by Dániel Nagy.

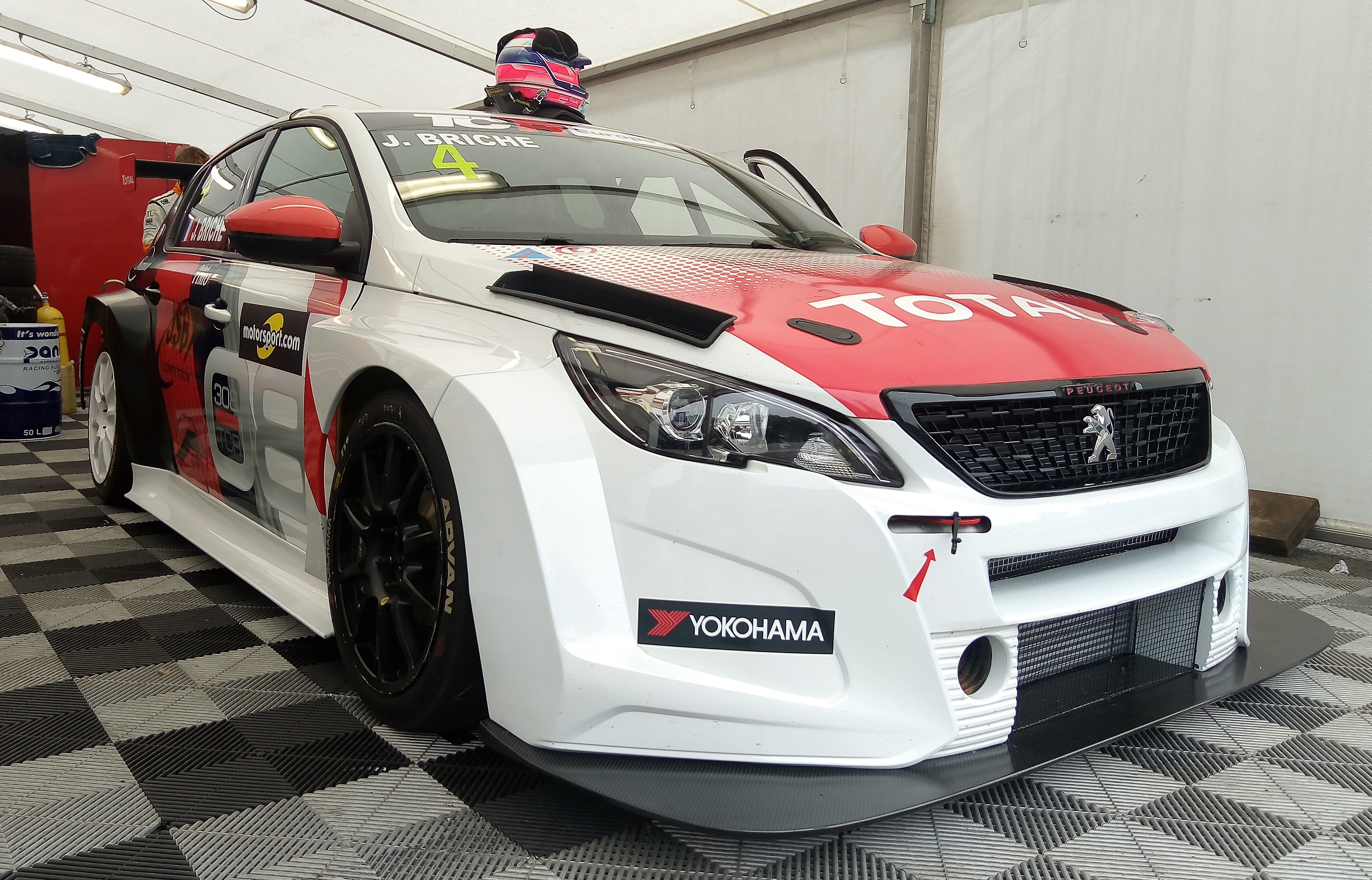
The JSB Compétition Peugeot 308 TCR, driven by Julien Briché.

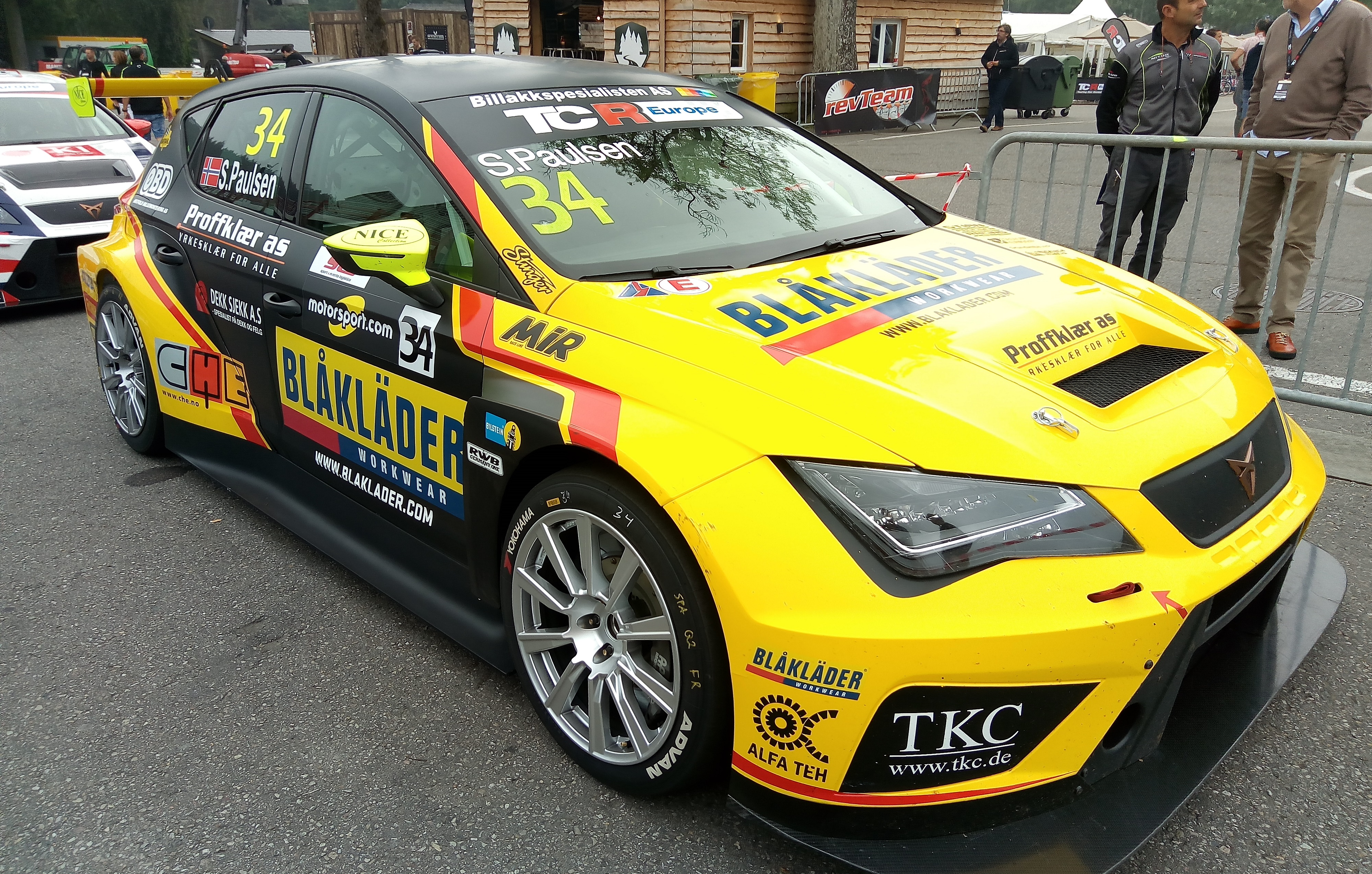
The Stian Paulsen Racing Cupra León TCR, driven by Stian Paulsen.

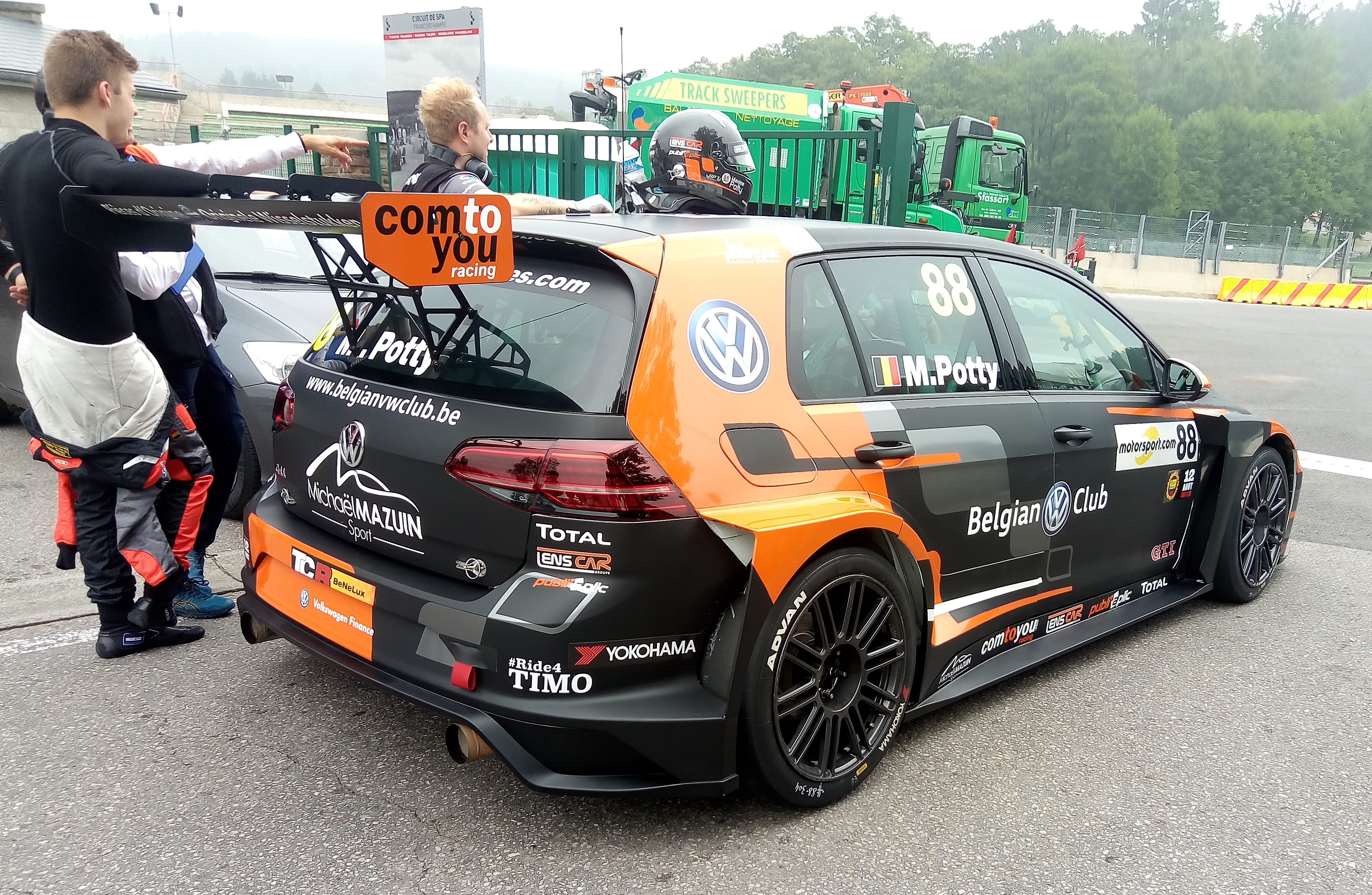
The Comtoyou Racing, 2017 spec Volkswagen Golf GTI TCR, driven by Maxime Potty.

Yokohama is the official tire supplier.

Team	Car	No.	Drivers	Class	Rounds
(Italy) Race Republic - NOS Racing	Subaru WRX STI TCR	3	(Italy) Cosimo Barberini		6
(Switzerland) Race Republic	Subaru WRX STI TCR	42	(Switzerland) Stefano Comini		1
(Italy) Race Republic - Top Run	Subaru WRX STI TCR	77	(Italy) Roberto Russo		6
(France) JSB Compétition	Peugeot 308 TCR	4	(France) Julien Briché	BNL	2–5, 7
(France) JSB Compétition	CUPRA León TCR	21	(France) Marie Baus-Coppens	BNL; DSG	2–5, 7
(Russia) LTA Rally Team	Volkswagen Golf GTI TCR	5	(Russia) Klim Gavrilov		7
(North Macedonia) LPR Stefanovski Racing Team	Hyundai i30 N TCR	7	(North Macedonia) Igor Stefanovski		1–2, 4–6
(Italy) Target Competition	Hyundai i30 N TCR	8	(Republic of Ireland) Reece Barr		All
(Italy) Target Competition	Hyundai i30 N TCR	15	(Germany) Peter Terting		7
(Italy) Target Competition	Hyundai i30 N TCR	62	(Serbia) Dušan Borković		All
(Italy) Target Competition	Hyundai i30 N TCR	94	(Switzerland) Kris Richard		All
(Hong Kong) Hell Energy Racing with KCMG	Honda Civic Type R TCR (FK8)	9	(Hungary) Attila Tassi		All
(Hong Kong) Hell Energy Racing with KCMG	Honda Civic Type R TCR (FK8)	99	(United Kingdom) Josh Files		All
(Hong Kong) Hell Energy Racing with KCMG	Honda Civic Type R TCR (FK8)	909	(Germany) Mike Halder		7
(North Macedonia) PSS Racing Team	Honda Civic Type R TCR (FK8)	10	(North Macedonia) Viktor Davidovski		All
(Denmark) Reno Racing	Honda Civic Type R TCR (FK8)	11	(Denmark) Jens Reno Møller		All
(Luxembourg) Autodis Racing by Piro Sports	Honda Civic Type R TCR (FK8)	13	(Germany) Cedric Piro	BNL	1–3
(Luxembourg) Autodis Racing by Piro Sports	Hyundai i30 N TCR	13	(Germany) Cedric Piro	BNL	4
(Luxembourg) Autodis Racing by Piro Sports	Hyundai i30 N TCR	15	(Germany) Peter Terting	BNL	5–6
(Luxembourg) Autodis Racing by Piro Sports	Hyundai i30 N TCR	14	(Luxembourg) Loris Cencetti	BNL	1–3
(Belgium) Autodis Racing by THX	Honda Civic Type R TCR (FK8)	14	(Luxembourg) Loris Cencetti	BNL	4–5
(Belgium) Autodis Racing by THX	Honda Civic Type R TCR (FK8)	42	(Switzerland) Stefano Comini	BNL	3–7
(Belgium) Autodis Racing by THX	Honda Civic Type R TCR (FK8)	630	(Belgium) Benjamin Lessennes	BNL	6
(Italy) Pit Lane Competizioni	Hyundai i30 N TCR	16	(Italy) Nicola Baldan		1
(Italy) Pit Lane Competizioni	Audi RS 3 LMS TCR	63	(Italy) Giovanni Altoè	DSG	1, 3, 5–6
(Italy) Pit Lane Competizioni	Audi RS 3 LMS TCR	71	(Italy) Enrico Bettera		1
(Italy) Pit Lane Competizioni	CUPRA León TCR	66	(Italy) Andrea Larini		1
(Hungary) M1RA	Hyundai i30 N TCR	16	(Italy) Nicola Baldan		6
(Hungary) M1RA	Hyundai i30 N TCR	26	(Portugal) Francisco Mora		1–4
(Hungary) M1RA	Hyundai i30 N TCR	555	(Hungary) Norbert Michelisz		7
(Hungary) M1RA	Hyundai i30 N TCR	999	(Hungary) Dániel Nagy		All
(Slovakia) Brutal Fish Racing Team	Volkswagen Golf GTI TCR	17	(Slovakia) Martin Ryba		2–4, 6–7
(Italy) Team Mulsanne	Alfa Romeo Giulietta TCR	18	(Italy) Fabrizio Giovanardi		6
(Sweden) WestCoast Racing	Volkswagen Golf GTI TCR	19	(Sweden) Andreas Bäckman		7
(Sweden) WestCoast Racing	Volkswagen Golf GTI TCR	116	(United Kingdom) Ashley Sutton		7
(Sweden) WestCoast Racing	Volkswagen Golf GTI TCR	126	(Sweden) Jessica Bäckman		7
(Hungary) JLG Motorsport with Zengő	CUPRA León TCR	20	(Hungary) Márk Jedlóczky		1–2, 4
(Hungary) Zengő Motorsport	CUPRA León TCR	55	(Hungary) Ferenc Ficza	DSG	4
(Czech Republic) Fullín Race Academy	CUPRA León TCR	22	(Czech Republic) Petr Fulín		7
(Portugal) Sports&You	Peugeot 308 TCR	23	(Portugal) Francisco Abreu		All
(Portugal) Sports&You	Peugeot 308 TCR	27	(Spain) Enrique Hernando		7
(Portugal) Speedy Motorsport	Audi RS 3 LMS TCR	24	(Portugal) Gustavo Moura		1
(Spain) PCR Sport	CUPRA León TCR	25	(Spain) Mikel Azcona		All
(Spain) PCR Sport	CUPRA León TCR	38	(Netherlands) Danny Kroes	BNL	All
(France) MN Développement	Volkswagen Golf GTI TCR	28	(France) Jean-Laurent Navarro		7
(United Kingdom) Pyro Motorsport	Honda Civic Type R TCR (FK8)	32	(United Kingdom) Oliver Taylor		6–7
(Norway) Stian Paulsen Racing	CUPRA León TCR	34	(Norway) Stian Paulsen		All
(Spain) Monlau Competición	CUPRA León TCR	35	(Thailand) Munkong Sathienthirakul		3, 5, 7
(Italy) Scuderia del Girasole	CUPRA León TCR	44	(Italy) Salvatore Tavano		6
(Luxembourg) Leopard Lukoil Team WRT	Audi RS 3 LMS TCR	46	(Netherlands) Jaap van Lagen	BNL	2
(Luxembourg) Leopard Lukoil Team WRT	Audi RS 3 LMS TCR	69	(France) Jean-Karl Vernay	BNL	1, 3–7
(Italy) CRC - Cappellari Reparto Corse	Volkswagen Golf GTI TCR	76	(Italy) Daniele Cappellari		6
(Spain) Baporo Motorsport	CUPRA León TCR	79	(Argentina) José Manuel Sapag		6
(Belgium) Comtoyou Racing	Volkswagen Golf GTI TCR	88	(Belgium) Maxime Potty	BNL	All
(Belgium) Comtoyou Racing	Audi RS 3 LMS TCR	223	(France) Nathanaël Berthon	BNL	7
(Serbia) LEIN Racing	CUPRA León TCR	111	(Serbia) Nikola Miljković		7

Icon	Class
BNL	TCR BeNeLux Series
DSG	DSG Challenge

== Results and standings ==
Rnd.		Circuit/Location	Date	Pole position	Fastest lap	Winning driver	Winning team	TCR BeNeLux winner	DSG Challenge winner
1	1	(France) Circuit Paul Ricard	5 May	(Serbia) Dušan Borković	(Switzerland) Kris Richard	(Serbia) Dušan Borković	(Italy) Target Competition	Not Held	(Italy) Giovanni Altoè
1	2	(France) Circuit Paul Ricard	6 May		(Hungary) Attila Tassi	(Serbia) Dušan Borković	(Italy) Target Competition	Not Held	(Italy) Giovanni Altoè
2	3	(Netherlands) Circuit Zandvoort	20 May	(Netherlands) Jaap van Lagen	(Spain) Mikel Azcona	(Spain) Mikel Azcona	(Spain) PCR Sport	(Netherlands) Jaap van Lagen	No entries finished
2	4	(Netherlands) Circuit Zandvoort	21 May		(Netherlands) Jaap van Lagen	(United Kingdom) Josh Files	(Hong Kong) Hell Energy Racing with KCMG	(Netherlands) Jaap van Lagen	(France) Marie Baus-Coppens
3	5	(Belgium) Circuit de Spa-Francorchamps	9 June	(France) Jean-Karl Vernay	(France) Jean-Karl Vernay	(France) Jean-Karl Vernay	(Luxembourg) Leopard Lukoil Team WRT	(France) Jean-Karl Vernay	(Italy) Giovanni Altoè
3	6	(Belgium) Circuit de Spa-Francorchamps	10 June		(France) Julien Briché	(France) Julien Briché	(France) JSB Compétition	(France) Julien Briché	(Italy) Giovanni Altoè
4	7	(Hungary) Hungaroring	7 July	(Spain) Mikel Azcona	(France) Julien Briché	(Serbia) Dušan Borković	(Italy) Target Competition	(France) Jean-Karl Vernay	(France) Marie Baus-Coppens
4	8	(Hungary) Hungaroring	8 July		(Portugal) Francisco Abreu	(Portugal) Francisco Mora	(Hungary) M1RA	(Switzerland) Stefano Comini	(Hungary) Ferenc Ficza
5	9	(Netherlands) TT Circuit Assen	18 August	(United Kingdom) Josh Files (Note: Josh Files qualified fastest but was handed a 3 place grid penalty for an infraction from the previous round. Files was credited with pole position and awarded the 5 championship points for it despite starting the race in 4th position. Jean-Karl Vernay, who was the next fastest qualifier, thus started from the first grid slot.)	(Hungary) Dániel Nagy	(Hungary) Dániel Nagy	(Hungary) M1RA	(France) Jean-Karl Vernay	(Italy) Giovanni Altoè
5	10	(Netherlands) TT Circuit Assen	19 August		(Hungary) Attila Tassi	(Hungary) Attila Tassi	(Hong Kong) Hell Energy Racing with KCMG	(Switzerland) Stefano Comini	(Italy) Giovanni Altoè
6	11	(Italy) Autodromo Nazionale Monza	22 September	(France) Jean-Karl Vernay	(France) Jean-Karl Vernay	(France) Jean-Karl Vernay	(Luxembourg) Leopard Lukoil Team WRT	Not Held	(Italy) Giovanni Altoè
6	12	(Italy) Autodromo Nazionale Monza	23 September		(France) Jean-Karl Vernay	(France) Jean-Karl Vernay	(Luxembourg) Leopard Lukoil Team WRT	Not Held	(Italy) Giovanni Altoè
7	13	(Spain) Circuit de Barcelona-Catalunya	20 October	(Hungary) Attila Tassi	(France) Jean-Karl Vernay	(Hungary) Attila Tassi	(Hong Kong) Hell Energy Racing with KCMG	(France) Jean-Karl Vernay	(France) Marie Baus-Coppens
7	14	(Spain) Circuit de Barcelona-Catalunya	21 October		(United Kingdom) Ashley Sutton	(Germany) Mike Halder	(Hong Kong) Hell Energy Racing with KCMG	(France) Jean-Karl Vernay	(France) Marie Baus-Coppens

=== TCR Europe standings ===
==== Drivers' standings ====
Pos.	Driver	LEC (France)		ZAN (Netherlands)		SPA (Belgium)		HUN (Hungary)		ASS (Netherlands)		MNZ (Italy)		BAR (Spain)		Pts.
1	(Spain) Mikel Azcona	3^{2}	5	1^{2}	6	3^{4}	4	**4**^{1}	14	9	2	2^{2}	5	5^{3}	8	181
2	(France) Jean-Karl Vernay	6	2			**1**^{1}	Ret	7	20	2^{2}	7	**1**^{1}	1	6	7	159
3	(Serbia) Dušan Borković	**1**^{1}	1	5^{5}	18	4	7	1^{4}	Ret	6	3	DSQ	DSQ	2^{4}	Ret	154
4	(Hungary) Attila Tassi	Ret	6	2^{3}	3	17	Ret	Ret^{2}	4	5	1	5^{3}	3	**1**^{1}	Ret	153
5	(Hungary) Dániel Nagy	2^{3}	3	7	11	8	6	3	2	1^{4}	Ret	Ret	12	7	2	138
6	(United Kingdom) Josh Files	4^{5}	15	4	1	Ret	19†	Ret^{3}	3	**10**^{1}	Ret	3^{4}	2	24^{2}	6	121
7	(Switzerland) Kris Richard	12	14	14^{4}	5	6	2	5	7	3^{5}	6	12	7	DSQ	EX	84
8	(Belgium) Maxime Potty	11	12	Ret	10	2^{2}	3	18	12	7^{3}	8	4^{5}	4	14	16	76
9	(Norway) Stian Paulsen	8^{4}	Ret	6	Ret	13^{5}	5	2	10	8	5	9	Ret	11	9	62
10	(Portugal) Francisco Mora	21†	4	9	8	DNS	10	Ret	1							44
11	(France) Julien Briché			Ret	Ret	5^{3}	1	16	15	14	11			8	22	42
12	(Switzerland) Stefano Comini	20	10			Ret	Ret	8	8	4	4	6	Ret	Ret	11	41
13	(Netherlands) Jaap van Lagen			**3**^{1}	2											38
14	(Netherlands) Danny Kroes	Ret	8	8	4	7	9	9	19	12	Ret	Ret	20	Ret	Ret	30
15	(Republic of Ireland) Reece Barr	5	17†	Ret	DNS	Ret	8	17^{5}	6	11	10	16	9	9	10	29
16	(Hungary) Norbert Michelisz													3^{5}	4	28
17	(United Kingdom) Ashley Sutton													4	3	27
18	(Germany) Mike Halder													Ret	1	25
19	(Denmark) Jens Reno Møller	9	7	10	7	18	13	6	16	13	9	17	Ret	25	Ret	25
20	(Germany) Peter Terting									21†	12	8	6	10	5	23
21	(Portugal) Francisco Abreu	13	16	11	9	9	11	Ret	5	15	DSQ	13	21	Ret	12	14
22	(Italy) Fabrizio Giovanardi											7	8			10
23	(North Macedonia) Igor Stefanovski	7	Ret	Ret	16			13	Ret	16	Ret	14	15			6
24	(Luxembourg) Loris Cencetti	Ret	9	13	12	14	18	11	11	Ret	13					2
25	(Hungary) Ferenc Ficza							Ret	9							2
26	(United Kingdom) Oliver Taylor											10	10	13	17	2
27	(Hungary) Márk Jedlóczky	15	11	12	13			10	21							1
28	(Italy) Nicola Baldan	10	18†									11	17			1
29	(Germany) Cedric Piro	14	Ret	17	14	10	12	12	Ret							1
30	(Italy) Giovanni Altoè	18	13			11	14			18	16	18	18			0
31	(Argentina) José Manuel Sapag											Ret	11			0
32	(Sweden) Andreas Bäckman													12	13	0
33	(Thailand) Munkong Sathienthirakul					12	15			20†	15			18	Ret	0
34	(Slovakia) Martin Ryba			16	19	15	17	Ret	13			15	14	17	19	0
35	(Italy) Salvatore Tavano											Ret	13			0
36	(North Macedonia) Viktor Davidovski	16	Ret	15	15	DNS	DNS	14	18	17	14	19	16	16	15	0
37	(Sweden) Jessica Bäckman													15	14	0
38	(France) Marie Baus-Coppens			Ret	17	16	16	15	17	19	17			21	20	0
39	(Italy) Enrico Bettera	17	Ret													0
40	(Spain) Enrique Hernando													19	18	0
41	(Italy) Daniele Cappellari											21	19			0
42	(Italy) Andrea Larini	19	Ret													0
43	(Czech Republic) Petr Fulin													20	23	0
44	(Italy) Roberto Russo											20	Ret			0
45	(Serbia) Nikola Miljković													DNS	21	0
46	(France) Jean-Laurent Navarro													22	Ret	0
47	(Russia) Klim Gavrilov													23	Ret	0
	(Portugal) Gustavo Moura	Ret	Ret													0
	(Belgium) Benjamin Lessennes											Ret	Ret			0
	(Italy) Cosimo Barberini											Ret	Ret			0
	(France) Nathanaël Berthon													Ret	Ret	0
Pos.	Driver	LEC (France)		ZAN (Netherlands)		SPA (Belgium)		HUN (Hungary)		ASS (Netherlands)		MNZ (Italy)		BAR (Spain)		Pts.

Colour	Result
Gold	Winner
Silver	Second place
Bronze	Third place
Green	Points classification
Blue	Non-points classification
Blue	Non-classified finish (NC)
Purple	Retired, not classified (Ret)
Red	Did not qualify (DNQ)
Red	Did not pre-qualify (DNPQ)
Black	Disqualified (DSQ)
White	Did not start (DNS)
White	Withdrew (WD)
White	Race cancelled (C)
Blank	Did not practice (DNP)
Blank	Did not arrive (DNA)
Blank	Excluded (EX)

**Bold** – Pole
Italics – Fastest Lap

† – Drivers did not finish the race, but were classified as they completed over 75% of the race distance.

==== Teams' standings ====
Pos.	Team	LEC (France)		ZAN (Netherlands)		SPA (Belgium)		HUN (Hungary)		ASS (Netherlands)		MNZ (Italy)		BAR (Spain)		Pts.
1	(Hong Kong) Hell Energy Racing with KCMG	4^{5}	6	2^{3}	1	17	19†	Ret^{2}	3	5	1	3^{4}	2	1^{1}	1	299
1	(Hong Kong) Hell Energy Racing with KCMG	Ret	15	4	3	Ret	Ret	Ret^{3}	4	**10**^{1}	Ret	5^{3}	3	24^{2}	6	299
2	(Italy) Target Competition	1^{1}	1	5^{5}	5	4	2	1^{4}	6	3^{5}	3	12	7	2^{4}	5	272
2	(Italy) Target Competition	5	14	14^{4}	18	6	7	5^{5}	7	6	6	16	9	9	10	272
3	(Spain) PCR Sport	3^{2}	5	1^{2}	4	3^{4}	4	**4**^{1}	14	9	2	2^{2}	5	5^{3}	8	213
3	(Spain) PCR Sport	Ret	8	8	6	7	9	9	19	12	Ret	Ret	20	Ret	Ret	213
4	(Hungary) M1RA	2^{3}	3	7	8	8	6	3	1	1^{4}	Ret	11	12	3^{5}	2	211
4	(Hungary) M1RA	21†	4	9	11	DNS	10	Ret	2			Ret	17	7	4	211
5	(Luxembourg) Leopard Lukoil Team WRT	6	2	3^{1}	2	**1**^{1}	Ret	7	20	2^{2}	7	**1**^{1}	1	**6**	7	197
6	(Belgium) Comtoyou Racing	11	12	Ret	10	2^{2}	3	18	12	7^{3}	8	4^{5}	4	14	16	76
6	(Belgium) Comtoyou Racing													Ret	Ret	76
7	(Norway) Stian Paulsen Racing	8^{4}	Ret	6	Ret	13^{5}	5	2	10	8	5	9	Ret	11	9	63
8	(France) JSB Compétition			Ret	17	5^{3}	**1**	15	15	14	11			8	20	43
8	(France) JSB Compétition			Ret	Ret	16	16	16	17	19	17			21	22	43
9	(Belgium) Autodis Racing by THX					Ret	Ret	8	8	4	4	6	Ret	Ret	11	40
9	(Belgium) Autodis Racing by THX							11	11	Ret	13	Ret	Ret			40
10	(Sweden) WestCoast Racing													4	3	27
10	(Sweden) WestCoast Racing													12	13	27
11	(Denmark) Reno Racing	9	7	10	7	18	13	6	16	13	9	17	Ret	25	Ret	25
12	(Portugal) Sports&You	13	16	11	9	9	11	Ret	5	15	DSQ	13	21	19	12	15
12	(Portugal) Sports&You													Ret	18	15
13	(Luxembourg) Autodis Racing by Piro Sports	14	9	13	12	10	12	12	Ret	20†	12	8	6			15
13	(Luxembourg) Autodis Racing by Piro Sports	Ret	Ret	17	14	14	18									15
14	(Italy) Team Mulsanne											7	8			10
15	(North Macedonia) LPR Stefanovski Racing Team	7	Ret	Ret	16			13	Ret	16	Ret	14	15			6
16	(Hungary) Zengő Motorsport							Ret	9							2
17	(United Kingdom) Pyro Motorsport											10	10	13	17	2
18	(Hungary) JLG Motorsport with Zengő	15	11	12	13			10	21							1
19	(Italy) Pit Lane Competizioni	10	13			11	14			18	16	18	18			1
19	(Italy) Pit Lane Competizioni	17	18†													1
20	(Switzerland) Race Republic	20	10													1
21	(Spain) Baporo Motorsport											Ret	11			0
22	(Spain) Monlau Competición					12	15			20†	15			18	Ret	0
23	(Slovakia) Brutal Fish Racing Team			16	19	15	17	Ret	13			15	14	17	19	0
24	(Italy) Scuderia del Girasole											Ret	13			0
25	(North Macedonia) PSS Racing Team	16	Ret	15	15	DNS	DNS	14	18	17	14	19	16	16	15	0
26	(Italy) CRC - Cappellari Reparto Corse											21	19			0
27	(Czech Republic) Fullín Race Academy													20	23	0
28	(Italy) Race Republic - Top Run											20	Ret			0
29	(Serbia) LEIN Racing													DNS	21	0
30	(France) MN Développement													22	Ret	0
31	(Russia) LTA Racing Team													23	Ret	0
	(Portugal) Speedy Motorsport	Ret	Ret													-
	(Italy) Race Republic - NOS Racing											Ret	Ret			-
Pos.	Driver	LEC (France)		ZAN (Netherlands)		SPA (Belgium)		HUN (Hungary)		ASS (Netherlands)		MNZ (Italy)		BAR (Spain)		Pts.

Colour	Result
Gold	Winner
Silver	Second place
Bronze	Third place
Green	Points classification
Blue	Non-points classification
Blue	Non-classified finish (NC)
Purple	Retired, not classified (Ret)
Red	Did not qualify (DNQ)
Red	Did not pre-qualify (DNPQ)
Black	Disqualified (DSQ)
White	Did not start (DNS)
White	Withdrew (WD)
White	Race cancelled (C)
Blank	Did not practice (DNP)
Blank	Did not arrive (DNA)
Blank	Excluded (EX)

**Bold** – Pole
Italics – Fastest Lap

† – Drivers did not finish the race, but were classified as they completed over 75% of the race distance.

==== DSG Challenge ====
Pos.	Driver	LEC (France)		ZAN (Netherlands)		SPA (Belgium)		HUN (Hungary)		ASS (Netherlands)		MNZ (Italy)		BAR (Spain)		Pts.
1	(Italy) Giovanni Altoè	18	13			11	14			18	16	18	18			200
2	(France) Marie Baus-Coppens			Ret	17	16	16	15	17	19	17			21	20	190
3	(Hungary) Ferenc Ficza							Ret	9							25

==== TCR BeNeLux Drivers' standings ====
Pos.	Driver	ZAN (Netherlands)		SPA (Belgium)		HUN (Hungary)		ASS (Netherlands)		BAR (Spain)		Pts.
1	(France) Jean-Karl Vernay			1^{1}	Ret	7	20	2^{1}	7	6	7^{2}	163
2	(Belgium) Maxime Potty	Ret^{4}	10	2^{2}	2	18^{4}	12	7^{2}	8	14	16^{3}	146
3	(France) Julien Briché	Ret^{3}	Ret	5^{3}	1	16^{1}	15	14^{3}	11	8	22(?)^{1}	117
4	(Netherlands) Danny Kroes	8^{2}	4	7^{5}	9	9^{3}	19	12^{5}	Ret	Ret^{5}	Ret	108
5	(Switzerland) Stefano Comini			Ret^{4}	Ret	8	8	4^{4}	4	Ret	11	108
6	(Luxembourg) Loris Cencetti	13	12	14	18	11^{2}	11	Ret	13			85
7	(France) Marie Baus-Coppens	Ret	17	16	16	15	17	19	17	21	20	70
8	(Germany) Cedric Piro	17^{5}	14	10	12	12^{5}	Ret					56
9	(Netherlands) Jaap van Lagen	3^{1}	2									55
10	(Germany) Peter Terting							21†	12			16
11	(France) Nathanaël Berthon									Ret^{4}	Ret	2
Pos.	Driver	ZAN (Netherlands)		SPA (Belgium)		HUN (Hungary)		ASS (Netherlands)		BAR (Spain)		Pts.

Colour	Result
Gold	Winner
Silver	Second place
Bronze	Third place
Green	Points classification
Blue	Non-points classification
Blue	Non-classified finish (NC)
Purple	Retired, not classified (Ret)
Red	Did not qualify (DNQ)
Red	Did not pre-qualify (DNPQ)
Black	Disqualified (DSQ)
White	Did not start (DNS)
White	Withdrew (WD)
White	Race cancelled (C)
Blank	Did not practice (DNP)
Blank	Did not arrive (DNA)
Blank	Excluded (EX)

**Bold** – Pole
Italics – Fastest Lap

† – Drivers did not finish the race, but were classified as they completed over 75% of the race distance.
