= L'Enfer (comic book) =

2025 comic book by Nicolas Badout

- Page count: 176 pages
- Publisher: Éditions Sarbacane

Creative team
- Writer: Nicolas Badout, after Henri-Georges Clouzot
- Artist: Nicolas Badout

Original publication
- Date of publication: 5 March 2025
- Language: French
- ISBN: 9791040804451

L'Enfer (lit. 'Hell') is a 2025 French comic book by Nicolas Badout. Set in 1962, it is about Marcel whose jealousy makes him increasingly paranoid and makes him hallucinate about his wife Odette being unfaithful. It is in black and white and based on Henri-Georges Clouzot's troubled and abandoned film Inferno.

Éditions Sarbacane published the comic book on 5 March 2025. Philippe LeBas of ActuaBD wrote that comics, as a visual medium without the economic restraints of filmmaking, suits the story well, and that the subject remains relevant.

== See also ==
- Hell (1994 film)
- Jealousy in art
