= Hell (Hell album) =

Studio album by Hell
- Released: August 11, 2017
- Recorded: 2014–2017
- Studio: The Burial Grounds
- Genre: Doom metal; sludge metal
- Length: 49:52
- Label: LowerYourHead; Sentient Ruin Laboratories (SRUIN053)
- Producer: M.S.W.

Hell chronology
| Hell III (2012) | Hell (2017) | Submersus (2025) |

Hell is the fourth studio album by Salem, Oregon, doom metal project Hell. It was released on August 11, 2017, as a limited cassette by the label Sentient Ruin Laboratories and as a digital download by Hell's own label, LowerYourHead. Hell received critical acclaim from the few publications that covered it. On April 22, 2018, Hell performed Hell in its entirety at Roadburn Festival.

The songs "SubOdin" and "Inscriptus" first appeared on Hell's 2015 EP, also called Hell.

== Background and composition ==
After Hell's trilogy of self-titled albums concluded in 2012 with Hell III, frontman M.S.W. considered discontinuing the project. About the change of heart, he said, "I was going to change the name of the project, thinking that a better name would suit the new sound more, but now I’m thinking I’ll keep the name and see how that goes."

"SubOdin"
"SubOdin" highlights the album's heavily downtuned guitars and highly distorted vocals.

Hell is a doom metal album and, as such, is driven by slow, downtuned guitar riffs. The reviewer Shakeel Cox-Henry noted that the vocal styles on the album are "very much alien" to traditional doom metal, describing them as abrasive, tortured and atonal. Operatic singing is incorporated on the introductory track, "Seelenos", by Karli Mcnutt. Cox-Henry wrote that, in addition to the unusual vocals, the songs are structured unconventionally, lacking predictable progression and varying often in tempo.

Another uncommon feature of Hell is its use of samples. The album's opening track, "Seelenos", contains quotes from the works of Emily Dickinson. The next track, "Helmzmen", has the Mayday call of a doomed ship that sank in the Gulf of Alaska. The song "Wandering Soul" contains a sample that the US military used in a psychological weapon project against the Viet Cong during the Vietnam War.

== Critical reception ==
Professional ratings
Review scores
| Source | Rating |
|---|---|
| Metal Injection | Very favorable |
| Midlands Metalheads | 4.5/5 stars |

Hell received highly positive reviews. Writing for Metal Injection, Cody Davis said, "[Hell's] entirety results in what can only be described as one of the most enthralling albums to come out in 2017 and a strong album of the year candidate." Shakeel Cox-Henry of Midlands Metalheads wrote, "This album is strong, consistent, and most importantly, uses its resources to create an atmosphere of dereliction and suffering that only Hell could create." Invisible Oranges said, "For an album so pummeling, there is a hint of sincerity hidden beneath its dense brawn." Hell appeared as number 14 on Stereogum's 2017 year-end best metal albums list; Ian Chainey in that publication called the album's execution "top-notch" and repeatedly praised its riffs.

=== Accolade ===
| Year | Publication | Country | Accolade | Rank |
|---|---|---|---|---|
| 2017 | Stereogum | United States | "The Best Metal Albums of 2017" | 14 |

== Track listing ==
All songs written by M.S.W.

CD and vinyl version
| No. | Title | Length |
|---|---|---|
| 1. | "Seelenos" | 4:20 |
| 2. | "Helmzmen" | 9:35 |
| 3. | "SubOdin" | 7:30 |
| 4. | "Machitikos" | 5:38 |
| 5. | "Wandering Soul" | 5:09 |
| 6. | "Inscriptus" | 5:01 |
| 7. | "Victus" | 12:36 |
| Total length: | | 49:52 |

Digital and cassette version
| No. | Title | Length |
|---|---|---|
| 1. | "Helmzmen" | 9:35 |
| 2. | "SubOdin" | 7:30 |
| 3. | "Machitikos" | 5:38 |
| 4. | "Wandering Soul" | 5:09 |
| 5. | "Inscriptus" | 5:01 |
| 6. | "Victus" | 12:36 |
| 7. | "Seelenos" | 4:20 |
| Total length: | | 49:52 |

== Personnel ==
Hell

- M.S.W. – guitar, bass guitar, drums, vocals, programming

Additional musicians

- A.L.N. (Liam Neighbors) – guest vocals
- T.A.S. – guest vocals
- Gina Eygenhuysen – violin on "Victus"
- Karli Mcnutt – operatic vocals on "Seelenos"

Technical personnel

- Blial Cabal – artwork
- Edgar McCray – mastering
