= Andréas Winding =

French cinematographer (1928–1977)

- Born: February 2, 1928; Cagnes-sur-Mer, Alpes-Maritimes, France
- Died: August 18, 1977 (aged 49); Paris, France
- Occupation: Cinematographer
- Children: Romain Winding

Andréas Winding (February 2, 1928 – August 18, 1977) was a French cinematographer known for films such as Henri-Georges Clouzot's Inferno, Friends, A Slightly Pregnant Man, Don Juan, or If Don Juan Were a Woman, Playtime, The Deadly Trap, Rider on the Rain and La Prisonnière.

== Selected filmography ==
- Graduation Year (1964)
- Playtime (1967)
- The 25th Hour (1967)
- Woman In Chains (1968)
- Friends (1971)
- The Beguines (1972)
- 7 Morts Sur Ordonnance (1975)
- Parisian Life (1977)
