= Igor Stefanovski =

Macedonian professional rally driver (born 1982)

Igor Stefanovski Idže
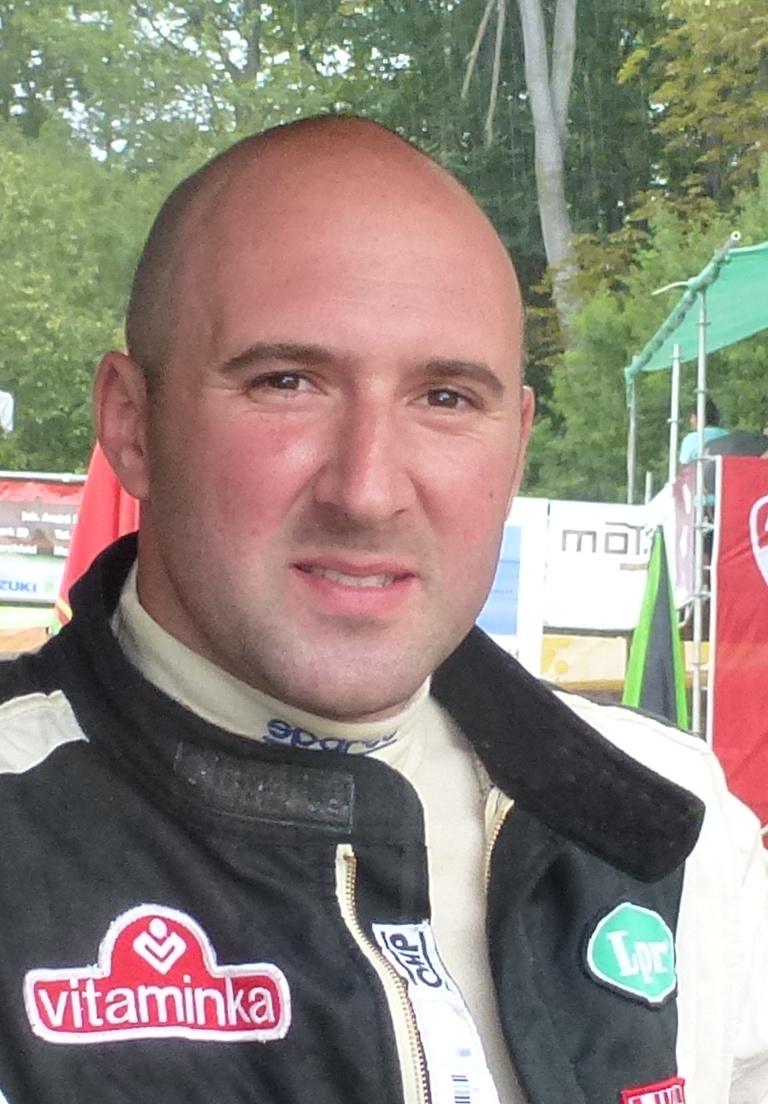
- Igor Stefanovski 2014
- Nationality: (North Macedonia) Macedonian
- Born: December 27, 1982 (age 43) Skopje, SR Macedonia, Yugoslavia

European Touring Car Cup career
- Debut season: 2016
- Current team: AKK Stefanovski
- Car number: 14
- Starts: 4
- Wins: 1
- Poles: 0
- Fastest laps: 0

Previous series
- 2014−2015: European Hill Climb Championship

Championship titles
- 2014 2015 2023: (gold) Champion; (gold) Champion; (gold) Champion

Igor "Idže" Stefanovski (Macedonian: Игор "Иџе" Стефановски; born 27 December 1982) is a Macedonian professional rally driver. He is currently competing in the European Touring Car Cup (ETCC). Stefanovski is a former European Hill Climb Championship participant, where he has won the championship three times, in 2014, 2015 and 2023. In his debut season in ETCC, he was a part of Slovenian LEMA Racing team, driving a SEAT León Cup Racer. Stefanovski was voted best athlete of Macedonia in 2014.

== Racing record ==
=== Complete TCR Europe Series results ===
(key) (Races in bold indicate pole position) (Races in italics indicate fastest lap)

Year	Team	Car	1	2	3	4	5	6	7	8	9	10	11	12	13	14	DC	Points
2018	LPR Stefanovski Racing Team	Hyundai i30 N TCR	LEC; 1; 7	LEC; 2 Ret	ZAN; 1 Ret	ZAN; 2; 16	SPA; 1	SPA; 2	HUN; 1; 13	HUN; 2 Ret	ASS; 1; 16	ASS; 2 Ret	MNZ; 1; 14	MNZ; 2; 15	CAT; 1	CAT; 2	23rd	6
