= Danny Kroes =

Dutch racing driver

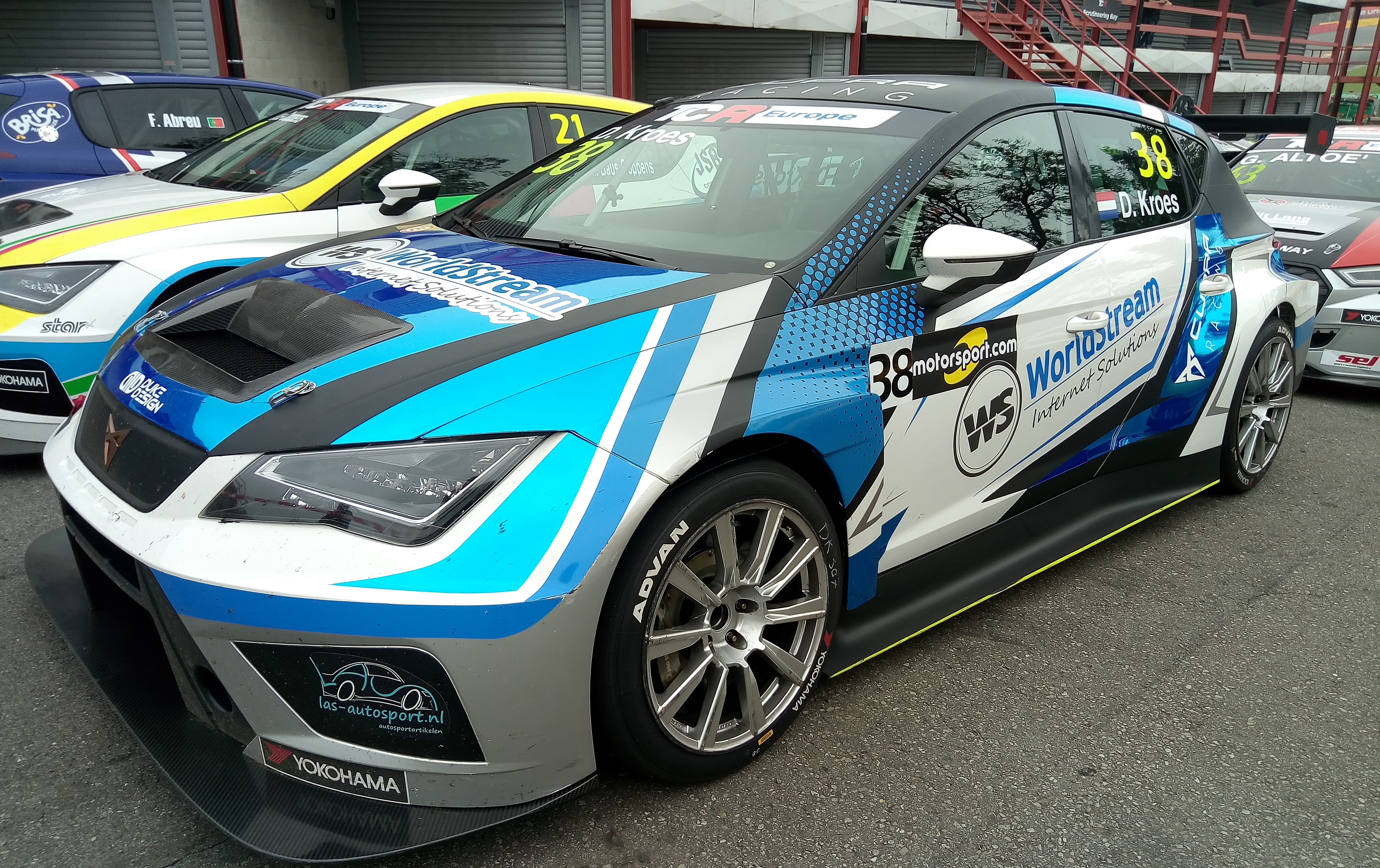
- Nationality: (Netherlands) Dutch
- Born: 5 November 1999 (age 27) Vijfhuizen, Netherlands

Lamborghini Super Trofeo Champion 2019 career
- Debut season: 2019
- Current team: Bonaldi Motorsport
- Categorisation: FIA Silver
- Car number: 3
- Former teams: Ferry Monster, PCR
- Starts: 16
- Wins: 5
- Poles: 5
- Fastest laps: 5
- Finished last season: European Champion and 3rd in World Championship

Previous series
- 2017 2017 2016 2016 2011-15: Supercar Challenge; TCR International Series; F4 Spanish Championship; SMP F4 Championship; Karting

Championship titles
- 2019: Lamborghini Super Trofeo Europe - Pro

Danny Kroes (born 5 November 1999) is a Dutch racing driver currently competing in the TCR International Series and TCR Benelux Touring Car Championship. Having previously competed in the SMP F4 Championship and F4 Spanish Championship amongst others.

== Racing career ==
Kroes began his career in 2011 in karting, where he competed until 2015. In 2016, he switched to the SMP F4 Championship, he finished the season twelfth in the championship standings that year. He also raced in the F4 Spanish Championship finishing eleventh in the standings. For 2017, he switched to the Champions, driving a SEAT León TCR for Ferry Monster Autosport partnering Pepe Oriola.

In June 2017, it was announced that Kroes would race in the TCR International Series, driving an SEAT León TCR for his TCR Benelux team Ferry Monster Autosport.

In 2018, Kroes competed in the TCR Europe series with Cupra TCR. He achieved a podium finish in only his second race at Zandvoort but suffered from bad luck and mechanical failures throughout the season.

In 2019, Kroes switched to Lamborghini and partnered with Russian driver Sergei Afanasiev. They won the Lamborghini Super Trofeo Pro class championship with their team, Bonaldi Motorsport. Kroes also took pole position, fastest race lap and a class win in the 24 Hours of Zolder, also in a Lamborghini Huracán Super Trofeo Run by Leipert Motorsport. At the world finals in Jerez, Kroes and Afanasiev took a third place, also with Bonaldi Motorsport.

== Racing record ==
=== Career summary ===
Season	Series	Team	Races	Wins	Poles	F/Laps	Podiums	Points	Position
2016	F4 Spanish Championship	MP Motorsport	9	0	0	0	0	0	NC†
2016	SMP F4 Championship	MP Motorsport	8	0	0	0	0	32	12th
2017	TCR International Series	Ferry Monster Autosport	2	0	0	0	0	2	33rd
2017	TCR BeNeLux Touring Car Championship	Ferry Monster Autosport	3	0	0	0	0	50	23rd
2017	Supercar Challenge - Supersport 1	Ferry Monster Autosport	4	0	1	3	1	57	11th
2017	Touring Car Endurance Series - TCR	Bas Koeten Racing							
2018	TCR Europe Touring Car Series	PCR Sport	14	0	0	0	0	30	14th
2018	TCR Middle East Series	Pit Lane Competizioni	2	0	0	0	0	6	12th
2019	Lamborghini Super Trofeo Europe - Pro	Bonaldi Motorsport	12	3	2	3	10	139	**1st**
2019	Lamborghini Super Trofeo World Final - Pro	Bonaldi Motorsport	2	0	0	0	1	10	6th
2020	Italian GT Championship - Endurance	Vincenzo Sospiri Racing	4	0	0	0	2	33	6th
2020	Italian GT Championship - Sprint	Vincenzo Sospiri Racing	8	0	0	0	4	70	5th
2022	GT World Challenge Europe Sprint Cup	GSM Novamarine	6	0	0	0	0	0	NC

† As he was a guest driver, Kroes was ineligible to score points.

=== Complete SMP F4 Championship results ===
(key) (Races in bold indicate pole position) (Races in italics indicate fastest lap)

Year	Team	1	2	3	4	5	6	7	8	9	10	11	12	13	14	15	16	17	18	19	20	DC	Points
2016	MP Motorsport	SOC; 1; 6	SOC; 2; 8	ZAN1; 1; 6	ZAN1; 2; 4	ZAN1; 3 Ret	ZAN2; 1; 9	ZAN2; 2; 11	ZAN2; 3; 11	MSC1; 1	MSC1; 2	MSC1; 3	MSC2; 1	MSC2; 2	MSC2; 3	AND; 1	AND; 2	AND; 3	AHV; 1	AHV; 2	AHV; 3	12th	32

=== Complete F4 Spanish Championship results ===
(key) (Races in bold indicate pole position) (Races in italics indicate fastest lap)

Year	Team	1	2	3	4	5	6	7	8	9	10	11	12	13	14	15	16	17	18	19	20	DC	Points
2016	MP Motorsport	NAV; 1	NAV; 2	NAV; 3	ALC; 1; 5	ALC; 2; 4	ALC; 3; 6	ALG; 1	ALG; 2	ALG; 3	VAL; 1 Ret	VAL; 2; 6	VAL; 3; 5	CAT; 1	CAT; 2	JAR; 1	JAR; 2	JAR; 3	JER; 1 Ret	JER; 2; 6	JER; 3; 8	NC	-

=== Complete TCR International Series results ===
(key) (Races in bold indicate pole position) (Races in italics indicate fastest lap)

Year	Team	Car	1	2	3	4	5	6	7	8	9	10	11	12	13	14	15	16	17	18	19	20	DC	Points
2017	Ferry Monster Autosport	SEAT León TCR	RIM; 1	RIM; 2	BHR; 1	BHR; 2	SPA; 1	SPA; 2	MNZ; 1	MNZ; 2	SAL; 1	SAL; 2	HUN; 1	HUN; 2	OSC; 1; 9	OSC; 2 Ret	CHA; 1	CHA; 2	ZHE; 1	ZHE; 2	DUB; 1	DUB; 2	33rd	2

=== Complete TCR Europe Series results ===
(key) (Races in bold indicate pole position) (Races in italics indicate fastest lap)

Year	Team	Car	1	2	3	4	5	6	7	8	9	10	11	12	13	14	DC	Points
2018	PCR Sport	CUPRA León TCR	LEC; 1 Ret	LEC; 2; 8	ZAN; 1; 8	ZAN; 2; 4	SPA; 1; 7	SPA; 2; 9	HUN; 1; 9	HUN; 2; 19	ASS; 1; 12	ASS; 2 Ret	MNZ; 1 Ret	MNZ; 2; 20	CAT; 1 Ret	CAT; 2 Ret	14th	30
