= Hell III =

Studio album by Hell
- Released: October 11, 2012
- Recorded: 2009–2012
- Studio: Mammoth Sound (Mastering)
- Genres: Doom metal; sludge metal; drone doom
- Length: 37:08
- Labels: LowerYourHead; Eternal Warfare (322-34); Pesanta (Pesanta Urfolk 023)
- Producer: M.S.W.

Hell chronology
| Hell II (2010) | Hell III (2012) | Hell (2017) |

Limited Pesanta vinyl cover
- Released in 2012

Hell III is the third studio album by multi-instrumentalist M.S.W.'s Salem-based doom metal solo project Hell. Originally released on October 11, 2012, the album was available on cassette through Eternal Warfare, on vinyl through Pesanta, and digitally through M.S.W.'s own label, LowerYourHead.

Hell III was performed in its entirety on the project's 2016 tour.

== Background and composition ==
Hell, a one-man project, concluded a trilogy of albums with Hell III. While the series began as pure doom metal, Hell II and, to a greater degree, Hell III incorporate black metal and funeral doom aspects into the music. Included with the moments of weight, aggression, extremely distorted guitar, and rasped vocals are periods of somber melancholy. The album comprises two songs, "Mourn" and "Decedere", both of which near twenty minutes in length.

=== "Mourn" ===
Hell III's first half, "Mourn", begins with a slow, clean guitar segment that lasts for five minutes. Ben Hudgins of Heathen Harvest wrote about this passage, "there’s a lengthy ambient guitar introduction that sulks on the borders of the apocalyptic domain of black metal before plunging over the edge into the tar-choked realms of sludge." Following that, the song quickly transitions into the downtuned guitar and driving percussion signature to doom metal. Unlike many singers in similar bands, M.S.W.'s vocals are delivered as high-pitched rasps. At the halfway point of "Mourn", the song slows and descends into a heavy passage that gradually decays and fades.

=== "Decedere" ===
"Decedere"
This clip from "Decedere" showcases the album's blend of styles.

The album's second half, "Decedere", took four years to complete. It follows a similar structure as "Mourn", beginning with "solemn and ambient guitar melodies" and later launching into protracted periods of heightened aggression before returning to quiet softness at the conclusion. Operatic vocals provided by Leah Estep appear alongside M.S.W.'s screams and rasps.

About performing "Decedere" live, M.S.W. said:

"That song is particularly special to me and not something I ever planned on playing live. Once you overplay a song in any band, it begins to become “just a song” and loses its importance in ways. This has happened with a few songs Hell now has played live hundreds of times in the past tours. That being said, I feel that we execute it perfectly as a live act and I’m glad that we are now able to perform it properly."

== Critical reception ==
Hell III was met with positive reception. In a review of Trilogy, a box set concluding with Hell III, Cody Davis of Metal Injection wrote, "It is a demented and diabolical listening experience worth turning out all of the lights and succumbing to the trepidation for an hour or so." Benjamin Bland of Echoes and Dust called Hell III "quite the journey," saying in his review, "The emotional power of this album is fairly devastating if you’re in a bleak frame of mind and the willingness of M.S.W. to draw in influences from inside and outside the drone and metal spheres to enhance his atmospheric vision is perhaps what makes this a rare essential listen." Writing for Heathen Harvest, Ben Hudgins said that Hell III cements the trilogy as unpredictable and full of surprises.

== Track listing ==
All songs written by M.S.W..

| No. | Title | Length |
|---|---|---|
| 1. | "Mourn" | 18:08 |
| 2. | "Decedere" | 19:00 |
| Total length: | | 37:08 |

== Personnel ==
Credits adapted from liner notes.

Hell

- M.S.W. – guitar, bass, drums, vocals, programming

Additional musicians

- Holly Williams – flute
- Marit Schmidt – viola
- Leah Estep – operatic vocals

Technical personnel

- Absorb – logo
- Dan Randall – mastering
