= Hell (American band) =

American doom metal solo project

- Hell performing at Roadburn 2016

Background information
- Origin: Salem, Oregon, U.S.
- Genres: Doom metal, blackened doom
- Years active: 2008–present
- Labels: LowerYourHead; Woodsmoke; Eternal Warfare; Vulture Print; GreySun Records
- Members: M.S.W.

Hell is an American doom metal solo project formed in 2008 by M.S.W., a multi-instrumentalist from Salem, Oregon. Hell began as a creative outlet for M.S.W., but it eventually gained momentum and grew to include a touring band. According to M.S.W., the project disregards typical religious themes and instead focuses on the concept of a "personal Hell".

== History ==
In 2008, M.S.W. created Hell as a solo endeavor. Regarding the project developing into something greater, he said:

Initially I just used Hell as an emotional outlet, but when people started to ask when Hell would perform a live show, I started thinking about a possible lineup. I never thought Hell would be where it is today. I envisioned the project remaining a solo endeavor, which it has, but never thought it would ever get as far as full U.S. tours with a full perfect line up of session musicians or anything like that. Right now, we're about to take off to Europe which is unreal to think about.

In 2009, the project's first album, Hell I, was released through Woodsmoke as a cassette limited to 100 copies. The debut's follow up, Hell II, was released a year later in 2010, and incorporated new subgenres of extreme metal for the project, like black metal. The conclusion of the initial trilogy, Hell III, was released in 2012 and adopted operatic and symphonic elements. After gathering an underground following, Hell performed at Roadburn 2016 and 2018 In 2017, Hell released its self-titled album to critical acclaim.

Many of Hell's studio albums borrow their cover art style from the work of Gustave Doré, albeit tinted red.

== Band members ==
Hell

- M.S.W. – songwriting, vocals, guitars, bass, drums

Additional touring members

- Liam Neighbors (A.L.N.) – drums
- Nate Meyers – bass
- Sheene Coffin – guitar

Past touring members

- Gina Hendrika Eygenhuysen – violin
- Kyle Wattson – drums
- Adam T. – drums
- Paul Reidel – guitar
- Kento Woolery – guitar

== Discography ==
Studio albums

- Hell I (2009)
- Hell II (2010)
- Hell III (2012)
- Hell (2017)
- Submersus (2025)

Extended plays

- Hell (2015)

Splits

- Ancestortooth/Hell – with Ancestortooth (2009)
- Resurrection Bay – with Thou (2012)
- Amarok/Hell – with Amarok (2013)
- Live Split – with Hail (2013)
- Hell/Mizmor – with Mizmor (2014)
- Hell/Primitive Man – with Primitive Man (2019)

Compilations

- Tour Through Hell 2013 (2013)
- Trilogy (2013)
- MMXVI (2014)
- Splits (2018)

Live albums

- Sheol (2014)
- Live at Roadburn 2018 (2019)
