= Hell (surname) =

Hell is a surname. Notable people with the surname include:

- Anne Chrétien Louis de Hell (1783–1864), French admiral, politician and governor
- Carl Magnus von Hell (1849–1926), German chemist
- Coleman Hell (born 1989), Canadian singer, producer and songwriter
- Maximilian Hell (1720–1792), Hungarian astronomer
- Pavol Hell, Czech-born Canadian mathematician and computer scientist
- Richard Hell (Richard Meyers; born 1949), American singer, songwriter and writer
- Rudolf Hell (1901–2002), German inventor
- Stefan Hell (born 1962), Romanian-German physicist
- Thom Hell (born 1976), Norwegian singer and songwriter

== Fictional characters ==
- Max Hell, protagonist of the 1996 film Max Hell Frog Warrior
- Sam Hell, protagonist of the 1988 film Hell Comes to Frogtown
