= Halle (Heve) =

River in Germany

Location
- Country: Germany
- States: North Rhine-Westphalia

Physical characteristics
- Mouth
  - location: Heve
  - coordinates: 51.4526°N 8.2407°E

Basin features
- Progression: Heve→ Möhne→ Ruhr→ Rhine→ North Sea

Halle is a small river of North Rhine-Westphalia, Germany. It is 6.2 km long and flows into the Heve near Hirschberg.

== See also ==
- List of rivers of North Rhine-Westphalia
