= Jigoku =

Jigoku may refer to:

== Films ==
- Jigoku, a 1960 Japanese horror film directed by Nobuo Nakagawa
- Jigoku, a 1979 Japanese horror film directed by Tatsumi Kumashiro
- Jigoku: Japanese Hell, a 1999 Japanese horror film directed by Teruo Ishii
- Hell Girl (Jigoku Shōjo), a 2005 Japanese anime
- Gate of Hell (film) (Jigokumon), a 1953 Japanese film

== Other ==
- Hell's Paradise: Jigokuraku, a 2018 Japanese manga
- Diyu, the hell of Chinese belief
- Naraka, the hell of Buddhist belief
- The hot springs of Beppu, Ōita, Japan
- Hell Courtesan (Jigoku Dayu), Japanese folklore character
