= Hell on Earth (band) =

US heavy metal musical group

Hell on Earth is a heavy metal and industrial rock band from Tampa, Florida.

In 1996, the group's debut album, Biomechanical Ejaculations Of The Damned was released. It was followed by tours which showcased their live music and visually stimulating performance art. They made regular guest appearances on regional and national radio shows.

In 2002, their sophomore album titled All Things Disturbingly Sassy was released. The band toured extensively and further developed their legendary concerts.

In September 2003 lead singer Billy Tourtelot said the band accepted a terminally-ill fan's request to die onstage during the band's concert scheduled for October 4, 2003 at The State Theatre in St. Petersburg, Florida. The intent was to bring attention to physician-assisted suicide on behalf of those who were suffering from terminal illness with the goal that laws could be changed to allow those individuals to have end-of-life choices. However, the concert was canceled by one of the owner of the venue. Consequently, Florida Governor Jeb Bush and Florida Attorney General Charlie Crist spun the band's message and announced that the band would be prosecuted for assisting with suicide. In 2004, the Florida Senate, in response to the band's actions, passed a bill barring the "exploitation of self-murder" for "commercial or entertainment purposes," subsequently signed into law by Governor Bush.

In 2011, their third album, Demon Alien Angels was released.

In 2022, the band's music video, For The Good Of The Hole was released. It is also the first single from their forthcoming album.

== Line-up ==
- Billy Tourtelot - Vocals, guitar, keyboards
- Seismal - Bass

== Past line-up ==
- Jonathan Lee (Acheron, The Autumn Offering) - Drums
- Erin Fuller - Drums
- M3 - Mike Walkowski - Guitar
- Joe Gilardi - Guitar
- Johnny Teabags - Guitar
- Mike McCracken - Drums
- Spence - Bass
- Paul Lydic - Bass
- Salva - Keyboards
