= Hall County =

Hall County is the name of several counties in the United States:

- Hall County, Georgia
- Hall County, Nebraska
- Hall County, Texas
