= USS Hall =

USS Hall may refer to more than one United States Navy ship:

- USS Hall (DD-583), a destroyer in commission from 1943 to 1946
- USS Charlton Hall (ID-1359), a cargo ship in commission from 1918 to 1919
- USS Craster Hall (ID-1486), a cargo ship in commission from 1918 to 1919
- USS Earle B. Hall (DE-597), a destroyer escort converted during construction into the high-speed transport USS Earle B. Hall (APD-107)
- USS Earle B. Hall (APD-107), a high-speed transport in commission from 1945 to 1946, 1950 to 1957, and 1961 to ca. 1965
- USS Howick Hall (ID-1303), a cargo ship in commission from 1918 to 1919
