= Hall (given name) =

Hall is a masculine given name which may refer to:

- Hall Caine (1853–1931), British novelist, dramatist, short story writer, poet and critic
- Hall Hibbard (1903–1996), American engineer, co-designer of the Lockheed P-38 Lightning World War II fighter
- Hall Overton (1920–1972), American composer
- Hall Roosevelt (1891–1941), American engineer, banker, soldier and municipal official, brother of First Lady Eleanor Roosevelt and nephew of President Theodore Roosevelt
