= FV Northern Belle =

American fishing vessel

Coordinates: 59°10′N 146°47′W

History
- Name: Northern Belle
- Owner: Northern Belle, Inc.
- Builder: Blue Streak Industries
- Yard number: SV35 (hull number)
- Completed: 1979
- Out of service: April 20, 2010
- Homeport: Seattle, Washington
- Identification: MMSI number: 367017580; Call sign: WCV9983; USCG Doc. No.: 615387
- Fate: Sunk in the Gulf of Alaska, April 20, 2010
- Notes: Formerly Cortez

General characteristics
- Type: Commercial fishing vessel
- Tonnage: 95 gt
- Length: 75.1 ft (22.9 m)
- Beam: 24.1 ft (7.3 m)
- Depth: 8.6 ft (2.6 m)

FV Northern Belle was a fishing vessel that sank in the Gulf of Alaska on April 20, 2010. Three of her four crew were rescued alive; her captain, Robert Royer, died before rescue teams arrived.

Upon discovery that the EPIRB (Emergency position-indicating radiobeacon) was not operational, Captain Robert Royer returned to the bridge to send a distress call, believed to have saved the other crew members. Royer suffered a major head injury trying to jump overboard, and was found with no vital signs when the US Coastguard arrived.
