= Hel =

Hel or HEL may refer to:

== Places ==
- Hel Peninsula, on the Polish Baltic coast
  - Hel, Poland, a town on the Hel Peninsula
  - Hel Fortified Area, a fortress and naval base on the Hel peninsula
- Helsinki Airport (IATA code HEL)
- Hensall railway station, England (National Rail station code HEL)
- Human Engineering Laboratory, an Army research institute that specialized in ergonomics

== In science and technology ==
- Hardware Emulation Layer, in integrated circuitry
- High energy laser, a weapon
- High energy light

== In mythology and religion ==
- Hel (location), a location in Norse mythology
- Hel (mythological being), ruler of Hel, the location in Norse mythology
- Hel, a battle-axe used by Magnus the Good of Norway

== In arts and entertainment ==
- Hel (band), a Swedish band
- Hel, a character in the 1927 film Metropolis
- Club Hel, a location in the Matrix series
- Hel, a character in the mobile video game Fire Emblem Heroes

== Other uses ==
- History of the English language (education)
- Home equity loan

== See also ==
- Hell (disambiguation)
