= Henri-Georges Clouzot's Inferno =

Inferno
- Directed by: Henri-Georges Clouzot
- Written by: Henri-Georges Clouzot; Jean Ferry; José-André Lacour
- Starring: Serge Reggiani; Romy Schneider
- Cinematography: Andréas Winding
- Release date: 1964
- Country: France
- Language: French

Henri-Georges Clouzot's Inferno (French title: L'Enfer d'Henri-Georges Clouzot) is a film directed, written and produced by Henri-Georges Clouzot, cinematography by Andréas Winding and Armand Thirard, which remained unfinished in 1964. It was presented in 2009 as a full-length semi-documentary by Serge Bromberg.

== History ==
The film depicts the extreme jealousy of a hotelier, Marcel (Serge Reggiani, then 42 years old), towards his wife, Odette (Romy Schneider, then 26 years old). It was shot partly in black-and-white, partly in colour. Clouzot selected the title as an allusion to Dante's Inferno, and the names Odette and Marcel refer to characters in Marcel Proust's novel À la recherche du temps perdu.

Despite an unlimited budget from Columbia Pictures—Clouzot worked with three crews and 150 technicians—the shooting was beset by severe problems: everyone suffered from the record heat during July in the Cantal region; the main actor Serge Reggiani claimed to be ill (Jean-Louis Trintignant was asked to replace him); the artificial lake below the Garabit viaduct, an important part of the location, was about to be emptied by the local authorities; then Clouzot suffered a heart attack and was hospitalised in Saint-Flour. After three weeks, the film was abandoned.

== Cast ==
- Romy Schneider, Odette
- Serge Reggiani, Marcel
- Dany Carrel, Marylou
- Jean-Claude Bercq, Martineau
- Catherine Allégret, Yvette
- Blanchette Brunoy, Clotilde
- Mario David, Julien

== Other versions ==
In 1994, Claude Chabrol used the screenplay by Clouzot to make his film L'Enfer.

L'Enfer d'Henri-Georges Clouzot
- Directed by: Serge Bromberg
- Release date: 2009
- Country: France
- Language: French

In 2009, Serge Bromberg and Ruxandra Medrea released a 94-minute documentary with material selected from 15 hours (185 reels) of found scenes under the name L'Enfer d'Henri-Georges Clouzot. Bromberg was caught for two hours in a stalled elevator with a woman who turned out to be Clouzot's second wife, Inès de Gonzalez. Upon learning the identity of the woman and of the existence of the footage, Bromberg convinced her to release it to make his film. The documentary includes interviews with nine cast and crew members, notably Catherine Allégret, the production assistant from 1964, Costa Gavras, and the assistant cinematographer William Lubtchansky. Bromberg used the actors Bérénice Bejo and Jacques Gamblin to shoot some scenes where dialogue had to be delivered; the found material, which included some 30 hours of soundtrack, didn't contain suitable material.

The film was shown out-of-competition at the 2009 Cannes Film Festival, at the 2009 Toronto International Film Festival, and film festivals in New York, Vancouver, London and Rotterdam; it was nationally released in France on 11 November 2009. In 2010 it received the César Award for Best Documentary.

L'Enfer by Nicolas Badout is a comic-book adaptation of the film, published by Éditions Sarbacane in 2025.

== Visual effects ==
The film features several innovative and practical lighting techniques. Most notably in the psychedelic climax of the film, rotating lighting rigs were placed in-front of the camera and actors. The final effect created the illusion of the actors' faces transitioning between emotions, and personalities. They would also slowly change their emotions intensifying the effect when synced to each rotation.
