= Hell Energy Drink =

Energy drink brand

- Type: Energy drink
- Manufacturer: Hell Energy Magyarország Kft.
- Origin: Hungary
- Introduced: 2006
- Variants: HELL Classic; HELL Strong Apple; HELL Strong Red Grape; HELL Strong Cola; HELL Multivitamin; HELL Zero; HELL Summer Cool; HELL Ice Cool; HELL Magnum; HELL Strong Focus; HELL strong Watermelon Active; Speedstar; HELL Black Cherry; FloeWater
- Website: www.hellenergy.com

Hell Energy Drink (stylized as HELL) is a Hungarian energy drink brand distributed primarily in Europe and Asia. The brand was introduced in 2006 by a privately owned beverage company founded in Hungary in 2004. In 2009, the parent company officially adopted the name "Hell Energy Magyarország Kft." Hell Energy has headquarters in Hungary, Romania, the United Kingdom, Russia and Cyprus.

Following its launch, the brand grew rapidly and became the market leader in Hungary by 2009. Hell Energy gained international recognition through a two-year sponsorship deal with the AT&T Williams Formula 1 Team for the 2009 and 2010 seasons, becoming only the second energy drink brand to enter Formula One marketing.

As of 2026, Hell Energy leads the market in Bulgaria, Romania, Slovakia, Cyprus, Azerbaijan, North Macedonia, Greece, Croatia, Serbia, and Bosnia and Herzegovina and is available in more than 60 countries worldwide. The company operates a vertically integrated production facility and aluminum can factory in Szikszó, Hungary, which handles third-party contract manufacturing alongside producing the proprietary "Speedstar" energy drink brand for NORMA supermarkets.

On 3 July 2023, HELL ENERGY developed HELL AI, the world’s first energy drink created entirely using artificial intelligence systems. AI tools were applied across multiple stages of development, including product design, formulation, flavour profiling, taste evaluation, predictive modelling, quality and safety processes, and marketing-related elements.

Hell Energy is the builder and owner of Avalon Park, a resort, spa and event center complex in Miskolctapolca, a resort belonging to Miskolc. Avalon won several awards including gold medals in three categories at the World Luxury Hotel Awards. It received the internationally recognized 5-star classification at the International Hotel Awards.

== Factory ==
The Hell Energy factory was built in 2011 in Szikszó, Hungary, serving domestic and international markets. It has multiple canning lines with a combined production capacity of up to 18 million cans per day, as well as a laboratory for monitoring the drinks' quality and production parameters. The factory holds FSSC 22000 food safety certification and has a fully automatized logistic center with an area of 6,000 square meters. The Hell Energy filling factory is able to manufacture 250, 330, 475, and 500 ml cans and can process 10 billion aluminium beverage cans annually - manufacturing 4,406,400,000 and filling 6,103,176,000. The factory integrates aluminium can manufacturing and beverage filling at a single location, enabling full control over packaging supply and production scheduling. This vertical integration allows continuous production of milk-based canned beverages, a capability that is limited to a small number of facilities in Europe. The production complex also manufactures ready-to-drink iced coffee products. The facility is equipped with dedicated high-hygiene production lines designed for milk-based beverages filled into aluminium cans, including aseptic processing and on-site quality control laboratories. Iced Coffee products manufactured at the site are distributed to multiple international markets, alongside the company’s core energy drink portfolio. In 2012, it was named as one of Europe's three best factories in the 'Global and World Class Manufacturing' category at the Strategic Manufacturing Award in Düsseldorf, Germany.

In May 2024, Hell Energy and its subsidiary Quality Pack completed a €228 million expansion of the Szikszó production complex. The expansion added a new aluminium can manufacturing line and two new filling lines, bringing beverage production and aluminium can manufacturing together at the same site, and created 240 new jobs. According to Eurofound, as a result of the expansion the Szikszó plant became the largest factory in the world producing both beverages and aluminium beverage packaging.

== Ingredients ==
Hell Energy Drink
Nutritional value per 100 mL
- Energy: 196 kJ (47 kcal)
- Carbohydrates: 11g
- Sugars: 11g
- Fat: 0g
- Saturated: 0g
- Protein: 0g
Vitamins and minerals
Vitamins	Quantity %DV^{†}
Riboflavin (B2)	46% 0.6 mg
Niacin (B3)	50% 8.0 mg
Pantothenic acid (B5)	40% 2.0 mg
Vitamin B6	47% 0.8 mg
Vitamin B12	8% 0.2 μg
- Other constituents: Quantity
- Salts: 0.2 g
- ^{†}Percentages estimated using US recommendations for adults.

The caffeine content of a single can of Hell Energy is 80 mg/250 mL (32 mg/100 mL). This is about the same as one cup of espresso coffee.

=== Health Concerns ===
A single 250 mL can of Hell Energy contains approximately 27.5 grams of sugar (11 grams per 100 mL), which exceeds the World Health Organization's (WHO) recommended daily limit of 25 grams of added sugar for adults. The WHO advises limiting added sugar intake to reduce the risk of conditions such as obesity, type 2 diabetes, and heart disease. Regular consumption of high-sugar drinks (like Hell Energy, Red Bull, Monster, etc.) may lead to exceeding these recommendations, potentially increasing the risk of adverse health outcomes.

== Marketing ==
In 2009, Hell Energy signed a two-year sponsorship deal with the AT&T Williams Formula 1 Team, where Hell Energy became second in the energy drink sector to enter the world of Formula 1 Racing.

In 2018, Hell Energy signed Bruce Willis as their brand ambassador.

In 2024, Hell Energy launched its premium water brand FloeWater, with Eva Mendes as the face of the campaign.

In 2025, Michele Morrone became a brand ambassador for HELL Energy drinks.

In 2025, Megan Fox became a brand ambassador for HELL Ice Coffee.

== Awards and recognition ==
In 2026, HELL Energy Classic (250 ml) was ranked first in the Six Continents Index – Energy Drinks, the first independent global comparative assessment of the category. The project, led by Pat Eckert, a certified water sommelier and founder of Fine Liquids (Meckesheim, Germany), evaluated major energy drink brands collected from all six continents using a 36-point objective quality index based on formulation, transparency, and traceability. The ten highest-scoring products were submitted for independent laboratory verification in Switzerland. HELL Energy Classic achieved the highest score and received the Six Continents Index – Best Energy Drink Award 2026.

== Controversy ==
In 2020, both a Romanian newspaper Evenimentul Zilei as well as a Hungarian newspaper Magyar Narancs confirmed that the ethnic Hungarian Ernő Barabás Snr. was the owner of the Hell Energy Drink. 30 years earlier, on March 20, 1990, during the ethnic clashes of Târgu Mureș, Ernő took part in the group beating of Mihăilă Cofariu, an ethnic Romanian from Ibănești. Following the group beating, Cofariu remained neurologically disabled all his life. Ernő received a 10-year imprisonment sentence from the Romanian court, but he escaped by emigrating to Hungary. The Hungarian authorities denied all requests for extradition to the Romanian authorities.

As business owners, the Barabás family was included in Napi Gazdaság (Daily Economy)'s Top 100 list as early as 2013, their fortune estimated at 6.9 billion was enough for the 86th place. Forbes estimated this year at HUF 48.5 billion. Barabás family's fortune, making them the 26th richest Hungarians. In 15 years, the family built a global brand in Szikszó, Borsod-Abaúj-Zemplén county. The current owners of Hell Energy Kft. are the founder's two sons, Ernő Barabás Jr. and Zsolt Barabás. Publicly available information about the Barabás family is limited, despite the family's business interests and employment footprint in Hungary. The family has pursued legal action against media outlets over reports concerning its private affairs, including a lawsuit against Forbes after the magazine included the family in its ranking of Hungary's wealthiest individuals. Forbes subsequently published a follow-up article about the family's business interests. Between 2008 and 2020, companies connected to the Barabás family received Hungarian state and European Union funding, including grants and subsidised loans, with the total estimated by Magyar Narancs at up to HUF 46.2 billion.
