= Hell (1994 film) =

- Theatrical release poster
- Directed by: Claude Chabrol
- Written by: Claude Chabrol; Henri-Georges Clouzot
- Produced by: Marin Karmitz
- Starring: Emmanuelle Béart; François Cluzet; André Wilms; Marc Lavoine; Nathalie Cardone; Mario David; Christiane Minazzoli; Dora Doll
- Cinematography: Bernard Zitzermann
- Edited by: Monique Fardoulis
- Music by: Matthieu Chabrol
- Release date: 1994
- Running time: 105 minutes
- Country: France

Hell (French: L'Enfer), titled Torment in the USA, is a 1994 French psychological thriller film directed by Claude Chabrol. It was adapted by Chabrol from the screenplay by Henri-Georges Clouzot for the unfinished film L'Enfer, which Clouzot began shooting in 1964 but was unable to complete. The producer of Chabrol's film was Marin Karmitz and the leading actors were Emmanuelle Béart and François Cluzet.

== Plot summary ==
Paul (Cluzet) and Nelly (Béart) are a married couple who run a successful hotel. Paul begins to suspect Nelly of being unfaithful, and eventually descends into paranoia from which there is no escape. Instead of the usual final caption, "The End", L'Enfer finishes on a caption that reads "Without end..."

== Cast ==
- Emmanuelle Béart as Nelly
- François Cluzet as Paul Prieur
- Nathalie Cardone as Marylin
- André Wilms as Doctor Arnoux
- Marc Lavoine as Martineau
- Christiane Minazzoli as Mme Vernon
- Dora Doll as Mme Chabert
- Mario David as Duhamel
- Jean-Pierre Cassel as M. Vernon
- Thomas Chabrol as Julien
- Noël Simsolo as M. Chabert
- Yves Verhoeven as Young Boy

== Production ==
Filming took place at the Lac de Saint-Ferréol (Haute-Garonne), Revel (Haute-Garonne), and Castelnaudary (Aude).

== Year-end lists ==
- Honorable mention – Glenn Lovell, San Jose Mercury News
