= Harald Ramm =

Norwegian barrister

Harald Ramm (7 July 1895 – 28 January 1970) was a Norwegian barrister.

== Biography ==
He was born in Tromsø as a son of chief physician Fredrik Gottlieb Olsen Ramm (1855–1932) and Anna Margretha Brinchmann. In 1920 he married landowner's daughter Wilhelmine Helene Gulbranson. He finished his secondary education in 1913, and graduated with the cand.jur. degree from the Royal Frederick University in 1918.

== Career ==
He served as a deputy judge in Hadeland and Land District Court from 1919 to 1920, and then studied in London for some time. He started his own law firm in Kristiania in 1922, being a partner with barrister Johnny Ramm until 1926. In that year, Harald Ramm himself became a barrister with access to working with Supreme Court cases, and was a partner of C. A. Gulbranson until 1930. During the occupation of Norway by Nazi Germany Ramm was arrested by the Nazi authorities in October 1940, and was held at Møllergata 19 until the end of the month. From June to October 1942 he was incarcerated at Bredtveit concentration camp.

Ramm chaired the Norwegian-Dutch Association, Amorett Konfektionsfabrik, Gausdal Høyfjellshotel, Holmenkollen Turisthotel, Grand Hotel in Tønsberg, Grønvold & Selmer, Norsk Soyamelfabrikk, Radio Industri and Industribygg Larvik. He was a board member of the National Gallery of Norway, Morgenbladet, Norsk Philips, Philips Fabrikk Norsk, Vitaphil, G. & S. Eiendomsselskap, C. Frogner, SS Marna, and chaired the supervisory councils of SS Atlantica, SS Abu and SS Noruega.

== Honors ==
He was decorated as a Chevalier of the Legion of Honour and an Officer of the Order of Orange-Nassau. He died in January 1970 and was buried at Vestre gravlund.
