= Ramm =

Ramm is a surname. Notable people with the name include:

- Alexander Ramm (born 1940), American mathematician
- Alexandra Ramm-Pfemfert (1883–1963), German-Russian translator, publisher and gallery owner
- Benjamin Ramm (born 1982), British commentator on liberal politics
- Bernard Ramm (1916–1992), American Baptist theologian and apologist
- Colin Ramm (1921–2014), Australian particle physicist
- Eilert Waldemar Preben Ramm (1769–1837), Norwegian military officer
- Eva Ramm (1925–2026), Norwegian psychologist, essayist, novelist and children's writer
- Fredrik Ramm (1892–1943), Norwegian journalist
- Fredrik Gottlieb Olsen Ramm (1855–1932), Norwegian physician
- Friedrich Ramm (1744–1813), German oboist
- George Ramm (born 1996), British freestyle wrestler
- Haley Ramm (born 1992), American actress
- Hans Leonard Ramm Hansen (1879–1971), Norwegian-born American architect
- Harald Ramm (1895–1970), Norwegian barrister
- Harrison Ramm (born 2006), Australian rules footballer
- Herman Ramm (1922–1991), British archaeologist
- Jacob Ramm (1890–1982), Norwegian footballer
- James Ramm (born 1998), Australian rugby union player
- John Ramm, English comedian and actor
- Leandra Ramm (born 1984), American singer-songwriter, actress and television performer
- Minda Ramm (1859–1924), Norwegian writer
- Nick Ramm, British pianist and composer
- Nikolai Ramm Østgaard (1885–1958), Norwegian military officer
- Nicolay Ramm (born 1988), Norwegian journalist and comedian
- Nils Ramm (1903–1986), Swedish boxer
- Nils Arntzen Ramm (1903–1974), Norwegian engineer, military captain, and businessperson
- Olaf von Ramm, Canadian engineer
- Peter Gottfred Ramm (1834–1917), Danish military officer and politician
- Regine Ramm Bjerke (born 1949), Norwegian judge
- Valentina Ramm (1888–1968), Ukrainian composer
- Vladislav Ramm (born 1995), Russian singer
- Wilhelm Ramm (1921–1982), Norwegian chess player
