= Rammo =

Family name

Rammo is a surname. Notable people with the surname include:

- Antti Rammo (born 1983), Estonian racing driver
- Karl-Martin Rammo (born 1989), Estonian sailor
- Leida Rammo (1924–2020), Estonian actress and theatre director
- Willi Rammo (1925–2009), German boxer

== See also ==
- Ramm
