= Fredrik Ramm =

Norwegian journalist

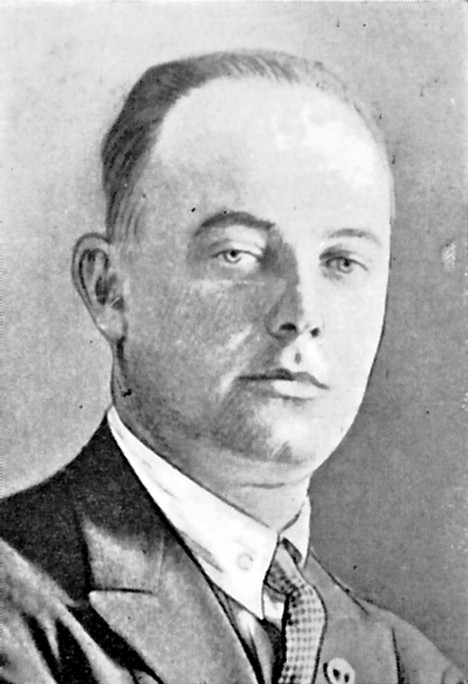
Fredrik Ramm.jpg

Fredrik Ramm (11 March 1892 – 15 November 1943) was a Norwegian journalist.

== Personal life ==
He was born in Oslo as a son of chief physician Fredrik G. O. Ramm and Anna Margaretha Brinchmann. He was a nephew of pioneering woman physician Louise Vally Ramm and writer Minda Ramm who was married to Hans E. Kinck. He was also a distant relative of Nikolai Ramm Østgaard.

In 1917 he married Eva With, settling at Vinderen. Their son Fredrik Ramm, Jr. became director of Norwegian Brewers.

== Career ==
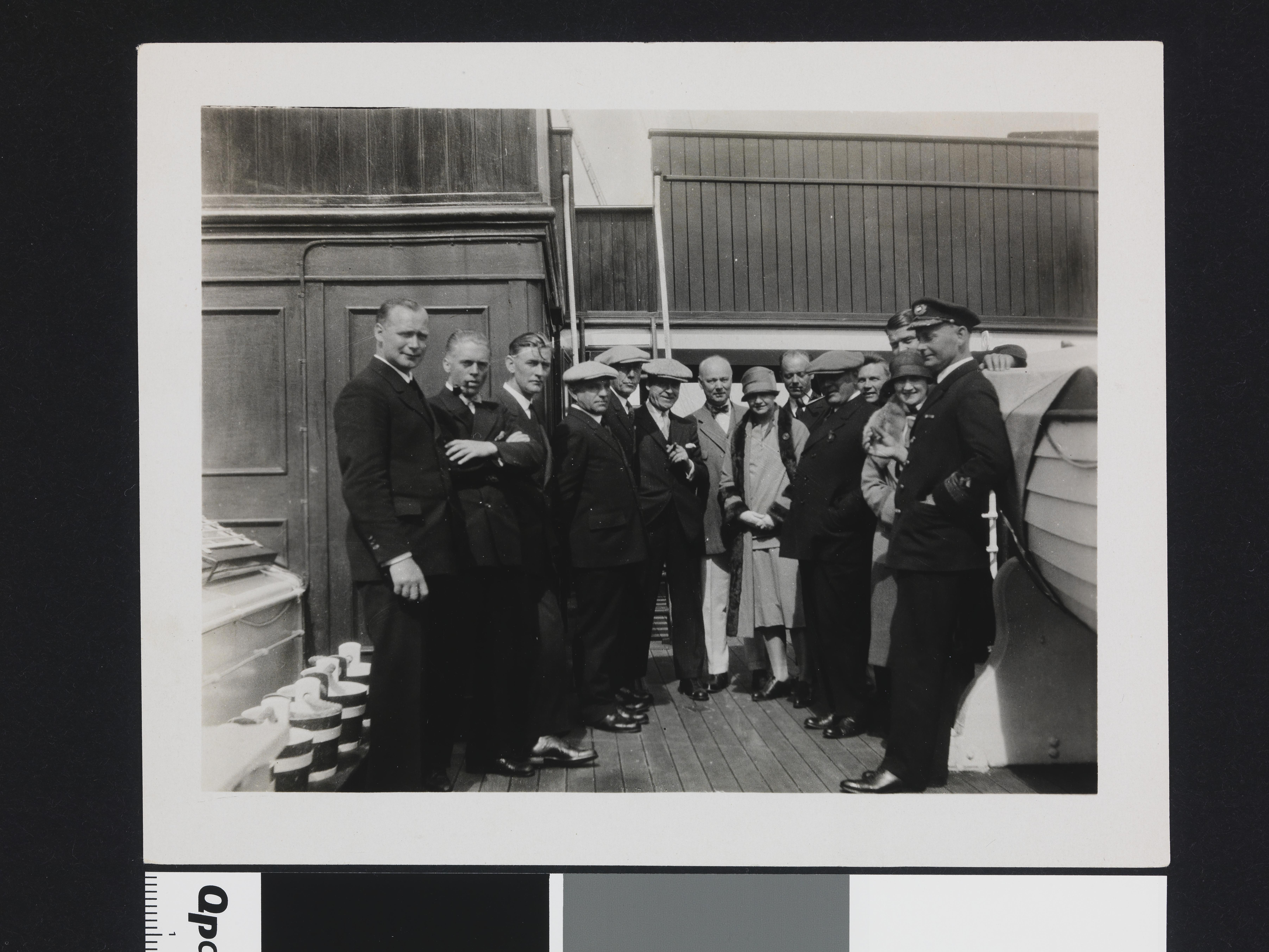

Ramm finished his secondary education in 1910. He was a journalist in Verdens Gang from 1915 and in Morgenbladet from 1917, Paris correspondent for Verdens Gang, Politiken og Stockholms-Tidningen from 1919 to 1921 and journalist in Tidens Tegn from 1921. After participating as the only journalist in Roald Amundsen's North Pole expedition in May 1925, he became news editor in Morgenbladet from 1928. He also wrote one chapter in Amundsen's book 88° nord.

Ramm also wrote the pamphlets En forsvarsbrochure in 1915 and Ruhr-aksjonen in 1925. He is especially known for the article "En skitten strøm flyter over landet" (A Dirty Stream Flows Over the Country) on 28 October 1931, an attack on Gyldendal Norsk Forlag's novel contest in 1931. Ramm saw the entrants to this contest as being infested by Freudianism. He especially lambasted the runner-up, the radical intellectual writer Sigurd Hoel, but also Hans Backer Fürst, Rolf Stenersen and Karo Espeseth. Together with people like Ronald Fangen Ramm participated in the Oxford Group.

He received the Italian Geographic Society Medal and was decorated as a Knight, First Class of the Order of St. Olav, a Knight of the Italian Order of the Crown and an Officier d'Académie in France.

== Death ==
During the occupation of Norway by Nazi Germany Ramm was arrested several times. From June to July 1940 he was held in Møllergata 19. He was then arrested in September 1941 following the milk strike, together with colleague Olaf Gjerløw. He was imprisoned in Grini concentration camp and Akershus Fortress before being shipped to Germany. In October 1941 he reached Hamburg-Fuhlsbüttel. After falling ill he got permission to go home in November 1943, but died in Denmark on the way back.

== Theatrical Tribute ==
After his death in 1943, on November 29, 1944, a special dramatic tribute to Ramm, And Still They Fight was presented at The New York Times Hall. The play was presented under the auspices of Moral Re-Armament, an international moral and spiritual movement founded in 1938 (now known as Initiatives of Change) as a tribute for "his courageous fight for a new Europe".
