= Kaçan =

Kaçan is a Turkish surname. Notable people with the surname include:

- Metin Kaçan (1961–2013), Turkish author
- Seda Kaçan (born 1994), Turkish female racing driver
