= Radio Industri =

Radio manufacturing company in Norway

Radio Industri was a radio manufacturing company in Oslo, Norway.

It was established in 1939, and produced radios for Philips. The production facility was at Sandakerveien 16 at Torshov. Philips also had a lightbulb factory named Philips Fabrikk Norsk, but it was closed in the 1980s. The whole Philips corporation in Norway moved to Sandstuveien 70 at Ryen in 1982.
