= 2023 TCR Italy Touring Car Championship =

Touring car season

The 2023 TCR Italy Touring Car Championship is the eighth season of the ITCC to run under TCR regulations and the 37th season since the national touring car series was revived in 1987 as the Campionato Italiano Turismo.

== Calendar ==
TCR Italian Festival, part of TCR World Tour

| Rnd. | Circuit | Location | Date |
|---|---|---|---|
| 1 | (Italy) Imola Circuit | Imola, Emilia-Romagna | 21–23 April |
| 2 | (Italy) Misano World Circuit Marco Simoncelli | Misano Adriatico, Emilia-Romagna | 5–7 May |
| NC | (Italy) Vallelunga Circuit | Campagnano di Roma, Lazio | 9–11 June |
| 3 | (Italy) Autodromo del Mugello | Scarperia e San Piero, Tuscany | 7–9 July |
| 4 | (Italy) Autodromo Nazionale di Monza | Monza, Lombardy | 15–17 September |
| 5 | (Italy) Vallelunga Circuit | Campagnano di Roma, Lazio | 13–15 October |
| 6 | (Italy) Imola Circuit | Imola, Emilia-Romagna | 27–29 October |

== Teams and drivers ==
| Team | Car | No. | Drivers | Class | Rounds | Ref. |
|---|---|---|---|---|---|---|
| (Italy) MM Motorsport | Honda Civic Type R TCR (FL5) | 1 | (Netherlands) Niels Langeveld | | All | |
| (Italy) MM Motorsport | Honda Civic Type R TCR (FK8) | 25 | (Italy) Paolo Rocca | U25 | All | |
| (Italy) MM Motorsport | Honda Civic Type R TCR (FK8) | 33 | (Romania) Horia-Traian Chirigut | M | 1–2 | |
| (Italy) MM Motorsport | Honda Civic Type R TCR (FK8) | 71 | (Brazil) Fabio Casagrande | | 4 | |
| (Italy) Target Competition | Hyundai Elantra N TCR | 2 | (Italy) Rodolfo Massaro | | All | |
| (Italy) Target Competition | Hyundai Elantra N TCR | 18 | (Italy) Marco Butti | U25 | All | |
| (Italy) Target Competition | Hyundai Elantra N TCR | 56 | (Italy) Cesare Brusa | | 3–4, 6 | |
| (Slovenia) Lema Racing | Audi RS 3 LMS TCR (2021) | 3 | (Italy) Giacomo Ghermandi | | 2, 6 | |
| (Italy) Raffaele Gurrieri | Cupra León Competición TCR | 4 | (Italy) Raffaele Gurrieri | M | All | |
| (Italy) GearWorks | Audi RS 3 LMS TCR (2021) | 5 | (Italy) Matteo Poloni | | 1–2, 4, 6 | |
| (Turkey) Bitci Racing Team AMS | Audi RS 3 LMS TCR (2017) | 6 | (Turkey) Ozen Zekai | | 4 | |
| (Italy) Aikoa Racing | Audi RS 3 LMS TCR (2021) | 7 | (Italy) Sandro Pelatti | | 3–4 | |
| (Italy) Aikoa Racing | Audi RS 3 LMS TCR (2021) | 15 | (Italy) Filippo Barberi | | 5 | |
| (Italy) Aikoa Racing | Audi RS 3 LMS TCR (2021) | 69 | (Italy) Francesca Raffaele | U25 | 1–3 | |
| (Italy) Aikoa Racing | Audi RS 3 LMS TCR (2021) | 72 | (Argentina) Franco Girolami | | All | |
| (Italy) Bolza Corse | Audi RS 3 LMS TCR (2021) | 8 | (Italy) Denis Babuin | M | All | |
| (South Korea) Solite Indigo Racing | Hyundai Elantra N TCR | 9 | (South Korea) Park Jun-ui | U25 | All | |
| (South Korea) Solite Indigo Racing | Hyundai Elantra N TCR | 70 | (South Korea) Park June-sung | | 2–6 | |
| (Italy) Scuderia del Girasole | Audi RS 3 LMS TCR (2021) | 10 | (Italy) Federico Paolino | | All | |
| (Italy) Scuderia del Girasole | Audi RS 3 LMS TCR (2021) | 21 | (Italy) Nicola Guida | M | All | |
| (Italy) Trico WRT | Hyundai Elantra N TCR | 11 | (Italy) Damiano Reduzzi | M | 1–4 | |
| (Italy) Trico WRT | Hyundai i30 N TCR | 16 | (Italy) Giuseppe Cartia | U25 | 1 | |
| (Spain) Auto Club RC2 Valles | Audi RS 3 LMS TCR (2021) | 12 | (Spain) Rubén Fernández | M | All | |
| (Spain) Auto Club RC2 Valles | Audi RS 3 LMS TCR (2021) | 19 | (Spain) Felipe Fernández | | 1–4, 6 | |
| (Spain) Auto Club RC2 Valles | Cupra León Competición TCR | 24 | (Mexico) Ernesto Olhagaray | | 4, 6 | |
| (Spain) Auto Club RC2 Valles | Audi RS 3 LMS TCR (2021) | 37 | (Venezuela) Sergio López Bolotin | | 1–3 | |
| (Spain) Auto Club RC2 Valles | Audi RS 3 LMS TCR (2021) | 41 | (Spain) Victor Fernández | M | All | |
| (Italy) Next Motorsport | Hyundai i30 N TCR | 13 | (Italy) Adriano Visdomini | M | 1–2 | |
| (Italy) PMA Motorsport | Audi RS 3 LMS TCR (2021) | 14 | (Italy) Felice Jelmini | | All | |
| (Italy) BRC Hyundai N Squadra Corse | Hyundai Elantra N TCR | 18 | (Italy) Marco Butti | U25 | NC | |
| (Italy) BRC Hyundai N Squadra Corse | Hyundai Elantra N TCR | 105 | (Hungary) Norbert Michelisz | W | NC | |
| (Italy) BRC Hyundai N Squadra Corse | Hyundai Elantra N TCR | 196 | (Spain) Mikel Azcona | W | NC | |
| (Italy) Tecniengines | Audi RS 3 LMS TCR (2021) | 22 | (Italy) Piero Necchi | | 2–3, 5 | |
| (Belgium) Audi Sport Team Comtoyou | Audi RS 3 LMS TCR (2021) | 22 | (Belgium) Kobe Pauwels | | NC | |
| (Belgium) Audi Sport Team Comtoyou | Audi RS 3 LMS TCR (2021) | 27 | (France) John Filippi | | NC | |
| (Belgium) Audi Sport Team Comtoyou | Audi RS 3 LMS TCR (2021) | 122 | (Belgium) Frédéric Vervisch | W | NC | |
| (Belgium) Audi Sport Team Comtoyou | Audi RS 3 LMS TCR (2021) | 176 | (United Kingdom) Robert Huff | W | NC | |
| (Estonia) ALM Motorsport | Honda Civic Type R TCR (FK8) | 27 | (Estonia) Ruben Volt | U25 | 1–2, 6 | |
| (Estonia) ALM Motorsport | Honda Civic Type R TCR (FL5) | 27 | (Estonia) Ruben Volt | U25 | 3–5 | |
| (Estonia) ALM Motorsport | Honda Civic Type R TCR (FK8) | 40 | (Estonia) Antti Rammo | | 1–2 | |
| (Estonia) ALM Motorsport | Honda Civic Type R TCR (FK8) | 23 | (Estonia) Mattias Vahtel | U25 | 1–2 | |
| (Estonia) ALM Motorsport | Honda Civic Type R TCR (FL5) | 123 | (Estonia) Mattias Vahtel | W | NC | |
| (Estonia) ALM Motorsport | Honda Civic Type R TCR (FL5) | 129 | (Argentina) Néstor Girolami | W | NC | |
| (Italy) NOS Racing | Cupra León Competición TCR | 30 | (Italy) Cosimo Barberini | | All | |
| (Italy) Team Aggressive Italia | Hyundai Elantra N TCR | 31 | (Italy) Kevin Ceccon | | NC | |
| (Italy) Team Aggressive Italia | Hyundai Elantra N TCR | 34 | (Belgium) Giovanni Scamardi | | 1–5 | |
| (Italy) Team Aggressive Italia | Hyundai Elantra N TCR | 64 | (Hungary) Levente Losonczy | U25 | All | |
| (Italy) Team Aggressive Italia | Hyundai Elantra N TCR | 68 | (Italy) Eric Brigliadori | | 6 | |
| (Spain) Volcano Motorsport | Audi RS 3 LMS TCR (2021) | 33 | (Romania) Horia-Traian Chirigut | M | 3, 5 | |
| (Italy) CRM Motorsport | Hyundai i30 N TCR | 44 | (Italy) Michele Imberti | | All | |
| (Italy) N Motors | Audi RS 3 LMS TCR (2021) | 48 | (Italy) Nello Nataloni | | All | |
| (Czech Republic) K2 Engine | Hyundai i30 N TCR | 59 | (Czech Republic) Dousan Kouril Jr. | U25 | 4 | |
| (Italy) Pinetti Motorsport | Audi RS 3 LMS TCR (2021) | 67 | (Italy) Marco Pellegrini | M | All | |
| (Italy) AutoGManolio | Hyundai i30 N TCR | 73 | (Italy) Gennaro Manolio | | 1–2 | |
| (France) SP Competition | Cupra León Competición TCR | 76 | (France) Aurélien Comte | | All, NC | |
| (France) SP Competition | Cupra León Competición TCR | 77 | (France) Sylvain Pussier | M | All, NC | |
| (Sweden) Cyan Racing Lynk & Co | Lynk & Co 03 FL TCR | 111 | (Sweden) Thed Björk | W | NC | |
| (Sweden) Cyan Racing Lynk & Co | Lynk & Co 03 FL TCR | 112 | (Uruguay) Santiago Urrutia | W | NC | |
| (Sweden) Cyan Racing Lynk & Co | Lynk & Co 03 FL TCR | 155 | (China) Ma Qing Hua | W | NC | |
| (Sweden) Cyan Racing Lynk & Co | Lynk & Co 03 FL TCR | 168 | (France) Yann Ehrlacher | W | NC | |

| Icon | Class |
|---|---|
| U25 | Eligible for TCR Italy Under 25 Trophy |
| M | Eligible for TCR Italy Master Trophy |
| W | TCR World Tour entries not eligible to score points in the local series |

=== DSG Challenge ===
| Team | Car | No. | Drivers | Rounds | Ref. |
|---|---|---|---|---|---|
| (Italy) Aikoa Racing | Audi RS 3 LMS TCR (2017) | 80 | (Italy) Filippo Barberi | All | |
| (Italy) Aikoa Racing | Audi RS 3 LMS TCR (2017) | 82 | (Italy) Francesco Cardone | 3–5 | |
| (Italy) Aikoa Racing | Audi RS 3 LMS TCR (2017) | 88 | (Italy) Luigi Gallo | 4–5 | |
| (Italy) Aikoa Racing | Audi RS 3 LMS TCR (2017) | 96 | (Italy) Paolo Palanti | 1–5 | |
| (Italy) Aikoa Racing | Audi RS 3 LMS TCR (2017) | 99 | (Italy) Stefano De Vecchi | 1–2 | |
| (Turkey) Bitci Racing Team AMS | Audi RS 3 LMS TCR (2017) | 81 | (Turkey) Vedat Ali Dalokay | 1–5 | |
| (Turkey) Bitci Racing Team AMS | Audi RS 3 LMS TCR (2017) | 83 | (Turkey) Seda Kaçan | 6 | |
| (Italy) Pro Race | Cupra León TCR | 86 | (Italy) Giorgio Fantilli | 1–3, 5 | |
| (Italy) RC Motorsport | Audi RS 3 LMS TCR (2017) | 88 | (Italy) Luigi Gallo | 1–3 | |
| (Italy) RC Motorsport | Audi RS 3 LMS TCR (2017) | 92 | (Italy) Carlotta Fedeli | 1–3 | |
| (Italy) RC Motorsport | Audi RS 3 LMS TCR (2017) | 98 | (Italy) Eric Brigliadori | 5 | |
| (Italy) NOS Racing | Volkswagen Golf GTI TCR | 89 | (Italy) Niccolò Loia | 1, 3–5 | |
| (Italy) NOS Racing | Volkswagen Golf GTI TCR | 93 | (Italy) Giorgio Massaini | 5 | |
| (Spain) Auto Club RC2 Valles | Cupra León TCR | 90 | (Italy) Mauro Trentin | 1–2, 4–6 | |
| (Italy) Abate Cars Technology | Volkswagen Golf GTI TCR | 91 | (Italy) Alberto Cioffi | 1–2 | |
| (Italy) Abate Cars Technology | Volkswagen Golf GTI TCR | 91 | (Italy) Luigi Cioffi | 1 | |
| (Italy) PMA Motorsport | Cupra León TCR | 95 | (Italy) Pietro Alessi | 5 | |
| (Italy) Greta Racing Lucania | Volkswagen Golf GTI TCR | 97 | (Italy) Vito Tagliente | 6 | |

== Results and standings ==
| Rnd. | | Circuit | Date | Pole position | Fastest lap | Winning driver | Winning team | Winning U25 driver | Winning Master driver | DSG Winning Driver | DSG Winning Team |
|---|---|---|---|---|---|---|---|---|---|---|---|
| 1 | 1 | Autodromo Enzo e Dino Ferrari, Imola | 21–23 April | (Italy) Marco Butti | (Argentina) Franco Girolami | (Italy) Marco Butti | (Italy) Target Competition | (Italy) Marco Butti | (Italy) Denis Babuin | (Italy) Carlotta Fedeli | (Italy) RC Motorsport |
| 1 | 2 | Autodromo Enzo e Dino Ferrari, Imola | 21–23 April | | (Argentina) Franco Girolami | (Argentina) Franco Girolami | (Italy) Aikoa Racing | (Italy) Marco Butti | (Spain) Rubén Fernández | (Turkey) Vedat Ali Dalokay | (Turkey) Bitci Racing Team AMS |
| 2 | 3 | Misano World Circuit Marco Simoncelli, Misano Adriatico | 5–7 May | (Italy) Marco Butti | (Netherlands) Niels Langeveld | (Netherlands) Niels Langeveld | (Italy) MM Motorsport | (Estonia) Ruben Volt | (Italy) Denis Babuin | (Turkey) Vedat Ali Dalokay | (Turkey) Bitci Racing Team AMS |
| 2 | 4 | Misano World Circuit Marco Simoncelli, Misano Adriatico | 5–7 May | | (Italy) Michele Imberti | (Italy) Michele Imberti | (Italy) CRM Motorsport | (Italy) Marco Butti | (Spain) Rubén Fernández | (Turkey) Vedat Ali Dalokay | (Turkey) Bitci Racing Team AMS |
| NC | 1 | ACI Vallelunga Circuit, Campagnano di Roma | 9–11 June | (Hungary) Norbert Michelisz | (Spain) Mikel Azcona | (Hungary) Norbert Michelisz | (Italy) BRC Hyundai N Squadra Corse | not held | not held | not held | not held |
| NC | 2 | ACI Vallelunga Circuit, Campagnano di Roma | 9–11 June | | (Spain) Mikel Azcona | (United Kingdom) Robert Huff | (Belgium) Audi Sport Team Comtoyou | not held | not held | not held | not held |
| 3 | 5 | Mugello Circuit, Scarperia | 7–9 July | (Italy) Marco Butti | (Netherlands) Niels Langeveld | (France) Aurélien Comte | (France) SP Competition | (Estonia) Ruben Volt | (Spain) Rubén Fernández | (Turkey) Vedat Ali Dalokay | (Turkey) Bitci Racing Team AMS |
| 3 | 6 | Mugello Circuit, Scarperia | 7–9 July | | (Netherlands) Niels Langeveld | (Italy) Felice Jelmini | (Italy) PMA Motorsport | (Estonia) Ruben Volt | (Spain) Rubén Fernández | (Italy) Luigi Gallo | (Italy) RC Motorsport |
| 4 | 7 | Autodromo Nazionale Monza, Monza | 15–17 September | (Argentina) Franco Girolami | (Netherlands) Niels Langeveld | (Argentina) Franco Girolami | (Italy) Aikoa Racing | (Italy) Marco Butti | (Italy) Denis Babuin | (Turkey) Vedat Ali Dalokay | (Turkey) Bitci Racing Team AMS |
| 4 | 8 | Autodromo Nazionale Monza, Monza | 15–17 September | | (Italy) Michele Imberti | (Netherlands) Niels Langeveld | (Italy) MM Motorsport | (Italy) Paolo Rocca | (Italy) Denis Babuin | (Turkey) Vedat Ali Dalokay | (Turkey) Bitci Racing Team AMS |
| 5 | 9 | ACI Vallelunga Circuit, Campagnano di Roma | 13–15 October | (Netherlands) Niels Langeveld | (Netherlands) Niels Langeveld | (France) Aurélien Comte | (France) SP Competition | (Hungary) Levente Losonczy | (Italy) Denis Babuin | (Italy) Eric Brigliadori | (Italy) RC Motorsport |
| 5 | 10 | ACI Vallelunga Circuit, Campagnano di Roma | 13–15 October | | (Netherlands) Niels Langeveld | (Argentina) Franco Girolami | (Italy) Aikoa Racing | (Estonia) Ruben Volt | (Spain) Rubén Fernández | (Italy) Eric Brigliadori | (Italy) RC Motorsport |
| 6 | 11 | Autodromo Enzo e Dino Ferrari, Imola | 27–29 October | (Estonia) Ruben Volt | (Netherlands) Niels Langeveld | (Italy) Marco Butti | (Italy) Target Competition | (Italy) Marco Butti | (Italy) Denis Babuin | (Italy) Filippo Barberi | (Italy) Aikoa Racing |
| 6 | 12 | Autodromo Enzo e Dino Ferrari, Imola | 27–29 October | | (Italy) Felice Jelmini | (Italy) Marco Butti | (Italy) Target Competition | (Italy) Marco Butti | (Italy) Marco Pellegrini | (Italy) Filippo Barberi | (Italy) Aikoa Racing |

Scoring system

| Position | 1st | 2nd | 3rd | 4th | 5th | 6th | 7th | 8th | 9th | 10th | 11th | 12th | 13th | 14th | 15th |
| Qualifying | 15 | 14 | 13 | 12 | 11 | 10 | 9 | 8 | 7 | 6 | 5 | 4 | 3 | 2 | 1 |
| Races | 40 | 35 | 30 | 27 | 24 | 21 | 18 | 15 | 13 | 11 | 9 | 7 | 5 | 3 | 1 |

=== Drivers' championship ===
For each category, drivers retain points from best 10 race results. For overall championship only, all qualifying results are also added towards drivers points. Drivers must also participate in at least 5 rounds to be classified.

TCR Italian Festival round at Vallelunga did not count for championship.

Overall

| Pos. | Driver | IMO1 | | MIS | | MUG | | MON | | VAL | | IMO2 | | Pts. |
|---|---|---|---|---|---|---|---|---|---|---|---|---|---|---|
| 1 | (Argentina) Franco Girolami | 2^{4} | 1 | 2^{2} | 5 | 3^{9} | 30† | 1^{1} | 2 | 2^{5} | 1 | 2^{3} | 3 | 427 (451) |
| 2 | (Netherlands) Niels Langeveld | 3^{3} | Ret | 1^{3} | 3 | 2^{2} | 25 | 2^{4} | 1 | 20^{1} | 2 | 3^{4} | 2 | 389 |
| 3 | (France) Aurélien Comte | 7^{12} | 7 | 5^{7} | 2 | 1^{3} | 3 | 6^{5} | 3 | 1^{4} | 5 | 6^{8} | 5 | 346 (382) |
| 4 | (Italy) Marco Butti | 1^{1} | 2 | Ret^{1} | 4 | 18^{1} | 10 | 4^{6} | 12 | Ret^{3} | 4 | 1^{6} | 1 | 332 |
| 5 | (Italy) Felice Jelmini | 4^{5} | 4 | 6^{6} | 7 | 4^{5} | 1 | 3^{3} | Ret | 23†^{6} | 7 | 4^{7} | 4 | 326 |
| 6 | (Italy) Michele Imberti | 29†^{14} | 10 | 4^{8} | 1 | Ret | Ret | 5^{14} | 6 | 5 | 6 | Ret | 9 | 202 |
| 7 | (Estonia) Ruben Volt | Ret^{10} | DNS | 7^{4} | Ret | 5^{10} | 4 | 10^{2} | 5 | 25†^{2} | 3 | Ret^{1} | DNS | 201 |
| 8 | (Italy) Denis Babuin | 6^{15} | 9 | 3^{5} | 21 | 10^{13} | 6 | 9 | 10 | 4^{11} | 11 | 7^{15} | Ret | 195 |
| 9 | (Spain) Rubén Fernández | 8^{11} | 5 | 16 | 10 | 7^{7} | 2 | 34† | 14 | 3^{7} | 8 | 21 | Ret | 174 |
| 10 | (South Korea) Park Jun-ui | Ret^{9} | Ret | 21 | 17 | 6^{8} | 32† | 8^{8} | 7 | 24†^{9} | 9 | 5^{5} | 7 | 150 |
| 11 | (Italy) Paolo Rocca | 9^{8} | 6 | 15^{13} | 13 | 11 | 31† | 17^{7} | 4 | 9 | 20 | Ret | DNS | 124 |
| 12 | (Spain) Felipe Fernández | 26 | 22 | 8^{11} | 6 | 32^{11} | 5 | 7^{13} | Ret | | | 20^{14} | 6 | 114 |
| 13 | (Hungary) Levente Losonczy | 11^{7} | 3 | 10^{15} | Ret | 13 | 11 | 35†^{15} | 16 | 6^{14} | 16 | Ret | 21 | 98 |
| 14 | (Italy) Rodolfo Massaro | 12 | 12 | 25^{9} | 9 | 27^{15} | Ret | 23 | 18 | 12 | 13 | 8^{10} | 8 | 83 |
| 15 | (South Korea) Park June-sung | | | 11 | 12 | 29 | 7 | Ret^{10} | 8 | 7^{15} | 22† | Ret^{12} | Ret | 78 |
| 16 | (Italy) Marco Pellegrini | 20 | 15 | 27^{10} | 11 | 8^{12} | 8 | 21^{12} | 22 | 21 | 15 | 10 | 10 | 77 |
| 17 | (Italy) Matteo Poloni | 5^{6} | 18 | 13 | Ret | DNP | DNP | 11^{9} | Ret | | | 12^{2} | 22† | 76 |
| 18 | (Italy) Cosimo Barberini | 19 | 13 | 12 | 8 | 12 | Ret | 28† | 13 | 8^{10} | 10 | Ret | DNS | 71 |
| 19 | (Italy) Nicola Guida | 21 | 23 | 20 | 16 | 33 | 15 | 12 | 17 | 11^{13} | 14 | 14 | 13 | 31 |
| 20 | (Belgium) Giovanni Scamardi | 16 | 21 | 17 | Ret | Ret | 9 | 13 | 11 | 15 | 19 | | | 28 |
| 21 | (France) Sylvain Pussier | Ret | 16 | 18 | 14 | 9 | 16 | 26 | 21 | 10 | Ret | Ret | DNS | 27 |
| 22 | (Italy) Federico Paolino | 14 | Ret | 19 | Ret | 19 | 18 | 22 | 15 | 17 | 17 | 22† | 12 | 11 |
| 23 | (Spain) Victor Fernández | Ret | Ret | 28 | 20 | 34 | 19 | 15 | 19 | 19 | Ret | 13 | 24† | 6 |
| 24 | (Italy) Nello Nataloni | 27 | Ret | 24 | 23 | 22 | 21 | 16 | 25 | 14 | Ret | Ret | 16 | 3 |
| 25 | (Italy) Raffaele Gurrieri | 15 | 17 | 22 | 22 | 17 | Ret | 33† | 24 | 16 | 18 | DNS | 15 | 2 |
Ineligible for championship
| - | (Estonia) Mattias Vahtel | 17^{2} | 8 | 9^{12} | Ret | | | | | | | | | (46) |
| - | (Italy) Francesca Raffaele | 10 | 11 | Ret | 15 | 14^{14} | 12 | | | | | | | (33) |
| - | (Italy) Cesare Brusa | | | | | Ret^{6} | 17 | Ret^{11} | 9 | | | Ret | 23† | (28) |
| - | (Italy) Eric Brigliadori | | | | | | | | | | | 9^{13} | 11 | (25) |
| - | (Venezuela) Sergio López Bolotin | 28^{13} | Ret | 14^{14} | Ret | Ret^{4} | Ret | | | | | | | (20) |
| - | (Italy) Filippo Barberi | | | | | 28 | 23 | 20 | Ret | 12 | 12 | 16 | 17 | (14) |
| - | (Italy) Giacomo Ghermandi | | | Ret | DNS | | | | | | | 11 | Ret | (11) |
| - | (Estonia) Antti Rammo | 13 | 14 | 26 | 24 | | | | | | | | | (8) |
| - | (Romania) Horia-Traian Chirigut | 24 | 20 | 30 | Ret | 16 | 13 | | | 21 | Ret | | | (5) |
| - | (Mexico) Ernesto Olhagaray | | | | | | | 18 | 23 | | | 15 | 14 | (4) |
| - | (Turkey) Vedat Ali Dalokay | | | | | 21 | 22 | 14 | 27 | | | | | (3) |
| - | (Italy) Sandro Pelatti | | | | | Ret | 14 | 29† | DNS | | | | | (3) |
| - | (Italy) Damiano Reduzzi | 22 | Ret | Ret | Ret | 15 | Ret | Ret | Ret | | | | | (1) |
| | (Italy) Mauro Trentin | | | | | | | 27 | 29 | | | 17 | 18 | 0 |
| | (Italy) Piero Necchi | | | DNS | DNS | 20 | DNS | | | 17 | 21† | | | 0 |
| | (Italy) Adriano Visdomini | 18 | 24 | 23 | 18 | | | | | | | | | 0 |
| | (Turkey) Seda Kaçan | | | | | | | | | | | 18 | 19 | 0 |
| | (Turkey) Ozen Zekai | | | | | | | 19 | 20 | | | | | 0 |
| | (Italy) Gennaro Manolio | 25 | 19 | 29 | 19 | | | | | | | | | 0 |
| | (Italy) Luigi Gallo | | | | | 23 | 20 | 31† | DNS | | | | | 0 |
| | (Italy) Giuseppe Cartia | 23 | Ret | | | | | | | | | | | 0 |
| | (Italy) Paolo Palanti | | | | | 26 | 24 | 24 | 28 | | | | | 0 |
| | (Italy) Carlotta Fedeli | | | | | 24 | 29 | | | | | | | 0 |
| | (Italy) Niccolò Loia | | | | | 25 | 26 | 25 | DNS | | | | | 0 |
| | (Brazil) Fabio Casagrande | | | | | | | 30† | 26 | | | | | 0 |
| | (Italy) Francesco Cardone | | | | | 31 | 27 | 32† | 30 | | | | | 0 |
| | (Italy) Giorgio Fantilli | | | | | 30 | 28 | | | | | | | 0 |
| | (Czech Republic) Dousan Kouril Jr. | | | | | | | Ret | DNS | | | | | 0 |
| Pos. | Driver | IMO1 | | MIS | | MUG | | MON | | VAL | | IMO2 | | Pts. |

| Colour | Result |
|---|---|
| Gold | Winner |
| Silver | Second place |
| Bronze | Third place |
| Green | Points classification |
| Blue | Non-points classification |
| Blue | Non-classified finish (NC) |
| Purple | Retired, not classified (Ret) |
| Red | Did not qualify (DNQ) |
| Red | Did not pre-qualify (DNPQ) |
| Black | Disqualified (DSQ) |
| White | Did not start (DNS) |
| White | Withdrew (WD) |
| White | Race cancelled (C) |
| Blank | Did not practice (DNP) |
| Blank | Did not arrive (DNA) |
| Blank | Excluded (EX) |

^{1-15} – Points-scoring position in qualifying

† – Drivers did not finish the race, but were classified as they completed over 75% of the race distance.

Master

| Pos. | Driver | IMO1 | | MIS | | MUG | | MON | | VAL | | IMO2 | | Pts. |
|---|---|---|---|---|---|---|---|---|---|---|---|---|---|---|
| 1 | (Italy) Denis Babuin | 6 | 9 | 3 | 21 | 10 | 6 | 8 | 10 | 4 | 11 | 7 | Ret | 372 (390) |
| 2 | (Spain) Rubén Fernández | 8 | 5 | 16 | 10 | 7 | 2 | 34† | 14 | 3 | 8 | 21 | Ret | 341 |
| 3 | (Italy) Marco Pellegrini | 20 | 15 | 27 | 11 | 8 | 8 | 21 | 22 | 21 | 15 | 10 | 10 | 304 (343) |
| 4 | (Italy) Nicola Guida | 21 | 23 | 20 | 16 | 33 | 15 | 12 | 17 | 11 | 14 | 14 | 13 | 286 (319) |
| 5 | (Italy) Raffaele Gurrieri | 15 | 17 | 22 | 22 | 17 | Ret | 33† | 24 | 16 | 18 | DNS | 15 | 225 |
| 6 | (France) Sylvain Pussier | Ret | 16 | 18 | 14 | 9 | 16 | 26 | 21 | 10 | Ret | Ret | DNS | 221 |
| 7 | (Spain) Victor Fernández | Ret | Ret | 28 | 20 | 34 | 19 | 15 | 19 | 19 | Ret | 13 | 24† | 202 |
Ineligible for championship
| - | (Romania) Horia-Traian Chirigut | 24 | 20 | 30 | Ret | 16 | 13 | | | 22 | Ret | | | (115) |
| - | (Italy) Adriano Visdomini | 18 | 24 | 23 | 18 | | | | | | | | | (87) |
| - | (Mexico) Ernesto Olhagaray | | | | | | | | | | | 15 | 14 | (54) |
| - | (Italy) Damiano Reduzzi | 22 | Ret | Ret | Ret | 15 | Ret | Ret | Ret | | | | | (42) |
| - | (Brazil) Fabio Casagrande | | | | | | | 30† | 26 | | | | | (36) |
| Pos. | Driver | IMO1 | | MIS | | MUG | | MON | | VAL | | IMO2 | | Pts. |

| Colour | Result |
|---|---|
| Gold | Winner |
| Silver | Second place |
| Bronze | Third place |
| Green | Points classification |
| Blue | Non-points classification |
| Blue | Non-classified finish (NC) |
| Purple | Retired, not classified (Ret) |
| Red | Did not qualify (DNQ) |
| Red | Did not pre-qualify (DNPQ) |
| Black | Disqualified (DSQ) |
| White | Did not start (DNS) |
| White | Withdrew (WD) |
| White | Race cancelled (C) |
| Blank | Did not practice (DNP) |
| Blank | Did not arrive (DNA) |
| Blank | Excluded (EX) |

Under 25

| Pos. | Driver | IMO1 | | MIS | | MUG | | MON | | VAL | | IMO2 | | Pts. |
|---|---|---|---|---|---|---|---|---|---|---|---|---|---|---|
| 1 | (Italy) Marco Butti | 1 | 2 | Ret | 4 | 18 | 10 | 3 | 12 | Ret | 4 | 1 | 1 | 366 |
| 2 | (Italy) Paolo Rocca | 9 | 6 | 15 | 13 | 11 | 31 | 17 | 4 | 9 | 20 | Ret | DNS | 301 |
| 3 | (Hungary) Levente Losonczy | 11 | 3 | 10 | Ret | 13 | 11 | 35† | 16 | 6 | 16 | Ret | 21 | 291 |
| 4 | (South Korea) Park Jun-ui | Ret | Ret | 21 | 17 | 6 | 32† | 7 | 7 | 24† | 9 | 5 | 7 | 290 |
| 5 | (Estonia) Ruben Volt | Ret | DNS | 7 | Ret | 5 | 4 | 10 | 5 | 25† | 3 | Ret | DNS | 244 |
Ineligible for championship
| - | (Italy) Francesca Raffaele | 10 | 11 | Ret | 15 | 14 | 12 | | | | | | | (135) |
| - | (Estonia) Mattias Vahtel | 17 | 8 | 9 | Ret | | | | | | | | | (86) |
| - | (Italy) Eric Brigliadori | | | | | | | | | | | 9 | 11 | (60) |
| - | (Italy) Filippo Barberi | | | | | | | | | 13 | 12 | | | (57) |
| - | (Italy) Giuseppe Cartia | 23 | Ret | | | | | | | | | | | (21) |
| | (Czech Republic) Dousan Kouril Jr. | | | | | | | Ret | DNS | | | | | 0 |
| Pos. | Driver | IMO1 | | MIS | | MUG | | MON | | VAL | | IMO2 | | Pts. |

| Colour | Result |
|---|---|
| Gold | Winner |
| Silver | Second place |
| Bronze | Third place |
| Green | Points classification |
| Blue | Non-points classification |
| Blue | Non-classified finish (NC) |
| Purple | Retired, not classified (Ret) |
| Red | Did not qualify (DNQ) |
| Red | Did not pre-qualify (DNPQ) |
| Black | Disqualified (DSQ) |
| White | Did not start (DNS) |
| White | Withdrew (WD) |
| White | Race cancelled (C) |
| Blank | Did not practice (DNP) |
| Blank | Did not arrive (DNA) |
| Blank | Excluded (EX) |

† – Drivers did not finish the race, but were classified as they completed over 75% of the race distance.

DSG Challenge

| Pos. | Driver | IMO1^{x} | | MIS^{x} | | MUG^{o} | | MON^{o} | | VAL^{x} | | IMO2^{o} | | Pts. |
|---|---|---|---|---|---|---|---|---|---|---|---|---|---|---|
| 1 | (Turkey) Vedat Ali Dalokay | 2 | 1 | 1 | 1 | 21 | 22 | 14 | 27 | 5 | 2 | | | 372 |
| 2 | (Italy) Filippo Barberi | 6 | 3 | 5 | 3 | 28 | 23 | 20 | Ret | 4 | 3 | 16 | 17 | 310 (331) |
| 3 | (Italy) Mauro Trentin | 4 | 4 | 4 | 6 | | | 27 | 29 | 7 | 4 | 17 | 18 | 274 |
| 4 | (Italy) Paolo Palanti | 3 | 5 | 6 | 4 | 26 | 24 | 24 | 28 | 9 | 6 | | | 254 |
| 5 | (Italy) Luigi Gallo | 5 | 7 | 2 | 5 | 23 | 20 | 31† | DNS | 6 | 5 | | | 245 |
Ineligible for championship
| - | (Italy) Carlotta Fedeli | 1 | 2 | 3 | 2 | 24 | 29 | | | | | | | (185) |
| - | (Italy) Niccolò Loia | 9† | Ret | | | 25 | 26 | 25 | DNS | 8 | 7 | | | (127) |
| - | (Italy) Francesco Cardone | | | | | 31 | 27 | 32† | 30 | 11 | DNS | | | (92) |
| - | (Italy) Giorgio Fantilli | DNQ | DNQ | Ret | 7 | 30 | 28 | | | 10 | 9 | | | (82) |
| - | (Italy) Eric Brigliadori | | | | | | | | | 1 | 1 | | | (80) |
| - | (Turkey) Seda Kaçan | | | | | | | | | | | 18 | 19 | (60) |
| - | (Italy) Alberto Cioffi | 7 | 6 | 7 | Ret | | | | | | | | | (57) |
| - | (Italy) Vito Tagliente | | | | | | | | | | | 19 | 20 | (54) |
| - | (Italy) Pietro Alessi | | | | | | | | | 2 | 9† | | | (48) |
| - | (Italy) Luigi Cioffi | 7 | 6 | | | | | | | | | | | (39) |
| - | (Italy) Stefano De Vecchi | 8 | DNS | 8 | Ret | | | | | | | | | (30) |
| Pos. | Driver | IMO1^{x} | | MIS^{x} | | MUG^{o} | | MON^{o} | | VAL^{x} | | IMO2^{o} | | Pts. |

| Colour | Result |
|---|---|
| Gold | Winner |
| Silver | Second place |
| Bronze | Third place |
| Green | Points classification |
| Blue | Non-points classification |
| Blue | Non-classified finish (NC) |
| Purple | Retired, not classified (Ret) |
| Red | Did not qualify (DNQ) |
| Red | Did not pre-qualify (DNPQ) |
| Black | Disqualified (DSQ) |
| White | Did not start (DNS) |
| White | Withdrew (WD) |
| White | Race cancelled (C) |
| Blank | Did not practice (DNP) |
| Blank | Did not arrive (DNA) |
| Blank | Excluded (EX) |

† – Drivers did not finish the race, but were classified.

^{x} – DSG entries raced separately from the main grid in these rounds.

^{o} – DSG entries raced alongside the main grid in these rounds.
