= Circuit Ricardo Tormo =

Race track in Valencia, Spain

- Grand Prix Circuit (1999–present)
- Location: Cheste, Valencian Community, Spain
- Coordinates: 39°29′9″N 0°37′41″W
- Capacity: 165,000 (125,000 seating)
- FIA Grade: 2 (2 layouts)
- Broke ground: 1998
- Opened: 19 September 1999; 27 years ago
- Major events: Current: Grand Prix motorcycle racing Valencian Community motorcycle Grand Prix (1999–2023, 2025–present); European motorcycle Grand Prix (2020); TCR World Tour (2025–present); NASCAR Euro Series (2012, 2014–present); Future: World SBK (2000–2010, 2027); Former: Formula E Valencia ePrix (2021); GTWC Europe (2021–2023, 2025); Ferrari Challenge Europe (2006, 2009–2011, 2015, 2017, 2019, 2021, 2023, 2025); FIA Motorsport Games (2024); TCR Europe (2024); WTCC Race of Spain (2005–2012); DTM (2010–2012); Le Mans Series (2007)
- Website: http://www.circuitricardotormo.com/

Grand Prix Circuit (1999–present)
- Length: 4.005 km (2.489 mi)
- Turns: 14
- Race lap record: 1:21.244 ( (United Arab Emirates) Andreas Zuber, Dallara GP2/05, 2006, GP2)

External Circuit (1999–present)
- Length: 3.136 km (1.949 mi)
- Turns: 11
- Race lap record: 1:15.919 ( (Spain) Alvaro Bajo, Porsche 911 (992 I) GT3 Cup, 2026, Carrera Cup)

School Circuit (1999–present)
- Length: 1.300 km (0.808 mi)
- Turns: 7

Formula E Circuit (2021)
- Length: 3.376 km (2.098 mi)
- Turns: 15
- Race lap record: 1:30.081 ( (United Kingdom) Alexander Sims, Mahindra M7Electro, 2021, F-E)

Circuit Ricardo Tormo, also known as Circuit de Valencia, is a 4.005 km (2.489 mi) motorsport race track located in Cheste (Valencian Community, Spain) and built in 1999. The track is named after Spanish, two-time world champion Grand Prix motorcycle racer Ricardo Tormo (1952–1998), who died in 1998 of leukemia. It has a capacity of 165,000 and a main straight of 0.876 km (0.544 mi).

The track hosts the MotoGP Valencian Community Grand Prix. Also, the FIA GT Championship had a race there in 2000 and 2004, the World Touring Car Championship from 2005 to 2012, the European Le Mans Series in 2007, and the DTM from 2010 to 2012. It has also been Formula E's pre-season test venue since the 2017–18 season, having moved from Donington Park, with the circuit also used as a replacement venue for the 2020–21 season because of the COVID-19 crisis cancelling numerous rounds. It was also the GP3 Series (now FIA Formula 3 Championship) pre-season test venue until the 2017 season. The series also hosted a one-off event at the track in 2013. The GP2 Series (now FIA Formula 2 Championship) also held rounds at the track in 2006 and 2007. Valencia has also hosted the season-opening round of the NASCAR Euro Series since 2014 (except 2020). The circuit also hosted the third edition of FIA Motorsport Games in October 2024.

== Formula E ==
The circuit has been used by Formula E as a pre-season testing venue since 2017 (with the exception of 2024). On 28 January 2021, it was announced that the circuit would host the Valencia ePrix as the 5th and 6th round of the 2020–21 Formula E World Championship, to be held on 24 April 2021, replacing the cancelled Paris ePrix. It was the first time an ePrix has been held on a permanent race circuit, albeit on a unique configuration. One of the differences between the normal track for pre-season testing and the track used for the race was the installation of a temporary chicane in the start/finish straight. The track then turns right immediately after the exit of turn 8.

In October 2024, flooding in the area forced pre-season testing to be relocated to the Circuito del Jarama near Madrid on 5–8 November 2024.

== In other media ==
The track has been recreated in the videogames Tourist Trophy and Gran Turismo PSP. The track also appears in other video games like Alfa Romeo Racing Italiano, GTR Evolution and rFactor as well. As it is a MotoGP round host, the track has appeared in every MotoGP game since its début in 1999, and the SBK games from 2006 to 2013. The latest recreation of the track was in Assetto Corsa Competizione in 2023.

== Layout configurations ==
Circuit Ricardo Tormo layout history
Grand Prix Circuit (1999–present)

Grand Prix Circuit Proposal (2006)

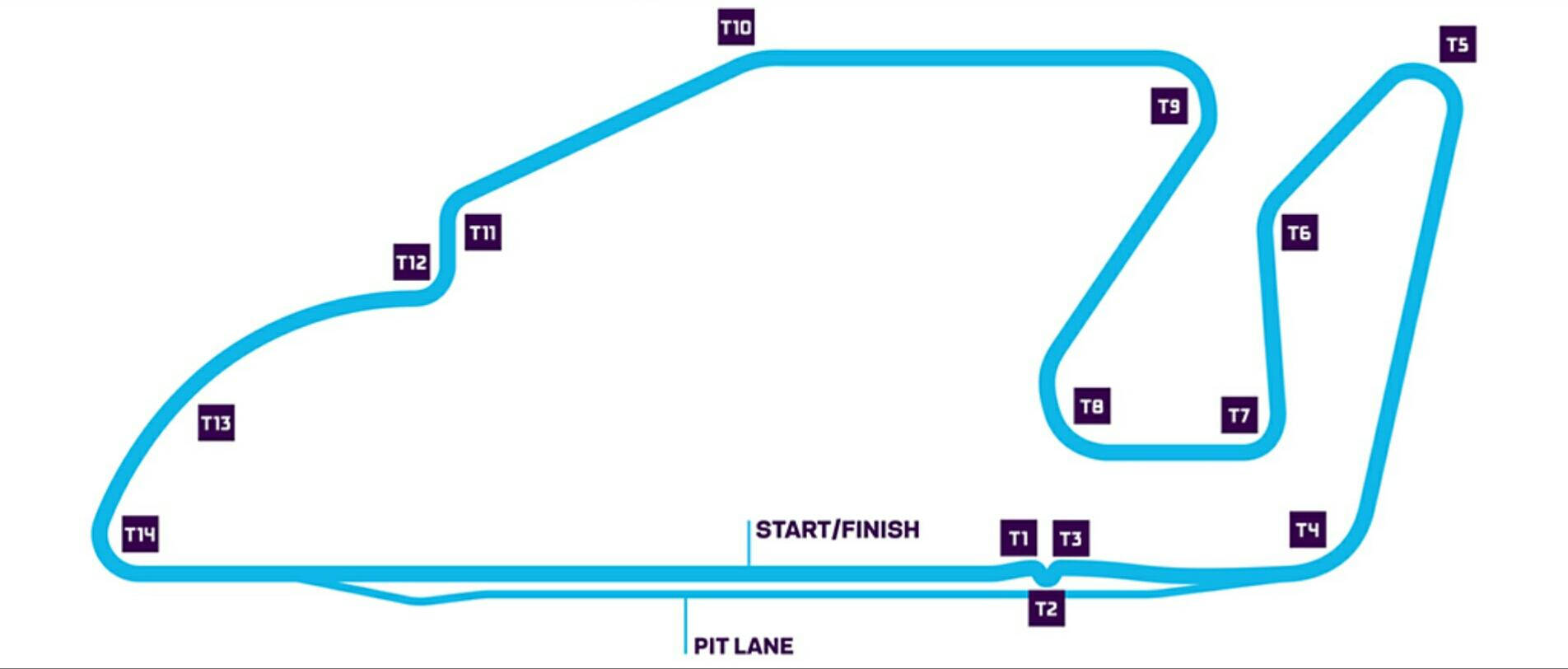
Formula E Pre-Season Testing Circuit (2018–2019)

Formula E Circuit (2021)

== Events ==
Current

- February: Formula Winter Series, GT Winter Series, GT4 Winter Series, Porsche Sprint Challenge Southern Europe
- March: Fun Cup
- April: NASCAR Euro Series, Formula 4 Spanish Championship, Spanish Truck Championship, GT-CER, GR Cup Spain
- June: TCR World Tour, TCR Spain Touring Car Championship, Copa Clio España, Porsche Sprint Challenge Iberica
- September: FIM Moto3 Junior World Championship, FIM Moto2 European Championship, TCR European Endurance, Spanish Superbike Championship, Supercars Endurance Series Valencia Iberian Racing Festival, Moto4 European Cup
- November: Grand Prix motorcycle racing Valencian Community motorcycle Grand Prix

Future

- Ferrari Challenge Europe (2006, 2009–2011, 2015, 2017, 2019, 2021, 2023, 2025, 2027)
- FIM Women's Circuit Racing World Championship (2027)
- Sportbike World Championship (2027)
- Superbike World Championship (2000–2010, 2027)
- Supersport World Championship (2000–2010, 2027)

Former

- Auto GP (2001, 2008–2009, 2011–2012)
- British Talent Cup (2018)
- Deutsche Tourenwagen Masters (2010–2012)
- Drift Masters (2024)
- Eurocup Mégane Trophy (2005)
- European F3 Open Championship (2001–2011)
- European Touring Car Championship (2004)
- European Truck Racing Championship (2000–2001, 2015)
- Eurocup-3 (2023)
- Eurocup Formula Renault 2.0 (2000, 2004–2005)
- F1 Academy (2023)
- Ferrari Challenge Finali Mondiali (2009–2010, 2012)
- FFSA GT Championship (1999)
- FIA Formula 3 European Championship (2012)
- FIA Formula Two Championship (2009–2010)
- FIA GT Championship (2000, 2004)
- FIA Motorsport Games (2024)
- FIM eRoad Racing World Cup (2013)
- Formula 3 Euro Series (2010–2012)
- Formula Abarth (2011–2012)
- Formula BMW Talent Cup (2012)
- Formula BMW World Final (2006–2007)
- Formula E
  - Valencia ePrix (2021)
- Formula Regional European Championship (2021)
- Formula Renault 2.0 West European Cup (2000, 2008–2009)
- Formula Renault 3.5 Series (2005)
- Formula Renault Eurocup (2000, 2004–2005)
- Formula Renault V6 Eurocup (2004)
- French F4 Championship (2009, 2022)
- GP2 Series (2006–2007)
- GP3 Series
  - Valencia GP3 Series round (2013)
- Grand Prix motorcycle racing
  - European motorcycle Grand Prix (2020)
- GT World Challenge Europe (2021–2023, 2025)
- GT2 European Series (2022–2023, 2025)
- International Formula Master (2007–2009)
- International GT Open (2006–2008, 2010)
- International GTSprint Series (2011)
- Italian Formula Renault Championship (2000, 2007)
- Italian Formula Three Championship (2012)
- Italian GT Championship (2008)
- Italian Superturismo Championship (2008)
- Lamborghini Super Trofeo Europe (2016, 2023)
- Lamborghini Super Trofeo World Final (2016)
- Le Mans Series
  - 1000 km Valencia (2007)
- MotoE World Cup
  - Valencia eRace (2019)
- Porsche Carrera Cup France (2008, 2022, 2025)
- Porsche Carrera Cup Germany (2010)
- Porsche Carrera Cup Italia (2008)
- Red Bull MotoGP Rookies Cup (2007, 2020, 2022)
- SEAT León Eurocup (2008–2010)
- Sidecar World Championship (2000–2003)
- Superstars Series (2008, 2011)
- TCR Europe Touring Car Series (2024)
- TCR International Series (2015)
- Ultimate Cup Series (2019)
- World Series by Nissan (1999–2004)
- World Touring Car Championship
  - FIA WTCC Race of Spain (2005–2012)

== Lap records ==
Anthony Davidson holds the unofficial lap record, set in 2006 while testing a Honda RA106, with a time of 1:08.540sec. As of September 2026, the fastest official race lap records at the Circuit Ricardo Tormo are listed as:

Category	Time	Driver	Vehicle	Event
Grand Prix Circuit (1999–present): 4.005 km (2.489 mi)
GP2	1:21.244	Andreas Zuber	Dallara GP2/05	2006 Valencia GP2 Series round
Formula Renault 3.5	1:22.448	Éric Salignon	Dallara T05	2005 Valencia Formula Renault 3.5 Series round
Formula Nissan	1:23.570	Ricardo Zonta	Dallara SN01	2002 2nd Valencia World Series by Nissan round
GP3	1:24.487	Melville McKee	Dallara GP3/13	2013 Valencia GP3 Series round
F3000	1:24.868	Marco Bonanomi	Lola B05/52	2009 Valencia Euroseries 3000 round
LMP1	1:25.234	Stéphane Sarrazin	Peugeot 908 HDi FAP	2007 1000 km of Valencia
Formula Three	1:26.378	Felix Rosenqvist	Dallara F312	2012 Valencia Formula 3 round
DTM	1:27.116	Bruno Spengler	BMW M3 DTM	2012 Valencia DTM round
F2 (2009–2012)	1:28.322	Kazim Vasiliauskas	Williams JPH1	2009 Valencia Formula Two round
LMP2	1:28.406	Thomas Erdos	MG-Lola EX264	2007 1000 km of Valencia
Formula Regional	1:28.456	Mari Boya	Tatuus F3 T-318-EC3	2023 Valencia Eurocup-3 round
International Formula Master	1:28.700	Josef Král	Tatuus N.T07	2009 Valencia International Formula Master round
MotoGP	1:29.976	Raúl Fernández	Aprilia RS-GP25	2025 Valencian Community motorcycle Grand Prix
LMP3	1:29.998	David Droux	Norma M30	2019 Valencia Ultimate Cup round
CN	1:30.059	Ander Vilariño	Norma M20-FC	2019 Valencia Ultimate Cup round
GT3	1:30.974	Finn Wiebelhaus	Mercedes-AMG GT3	2024 Valencia GT Winter Series round
Lamborghini Super Trofeo	1:32.092	Dennis Lind	Lamborghini Huracán Super Trofeo	2016 Valencia Lamborghini Super Trofeo Europe round
GT1 (GTS)	1:32.241	Uwe Alzen	Saleen S7-R	2004 FIA GT Valencia 500km
Moto2	1:32.773	Iván Ortolá	Boscoscuro B-25	2025 Valencian Community motorcycle Grand Prix
Formula 4	1:33.053	Valerio Rinicella	Tatuus F4-T421	2023 Valencia F4 Spain round
Formula Renault 2.0	1:33.454	Albert Costa	Tatuus FR2000	2009 Valencia Formula Renault 2.0 West European Cup round
Formula Abarth	1:33.567	Luca Ghiotto	Tatuus FA010	2012 Valencia Formula Abarth round
Ferrari Challenge	1:33.609	Jasin Ferati	Ferrari 296 Challenge	2025 Valencia Ferrari Challenge Europe round
SRO GT2	1:33.899	Anthony Beltoise	Audi R8 LMS GT2	2023 Valencia GT2 European Series round
Porsche Carrera Cup	1:33.949	Hugo Ellis	Porsche 911 (992 I) GT3 Cup	2024 Valencia Porsche Sprint Challenge Southern Europe round
Superbike	1:33.969	Ivo Lopes	BMW M1000RR	2026 Valencia ESBK round
World SBK	1:34.618	Noriyuki Haga	Ducati 1098R	2009 Valencia World SBK round
Supersport	1:34.992	Unai Orradre	Yamaha YZF-R6	2026 Valencia ESBK Supersport round
250cc	1:35.659	Mika Kallio	KTM 250 FRR	2007 Valencian Community motorcycle Grand Prix
N-GT	1:36.024	Sascha Maassen	Porsche 911 (996) GT3-RSR	2004 FIA GT Valencia 500km
500cc	1:36.085	Àlex Crivillé	Honda NSR500	2000 Valencian Community motorcycle Grand Prix
GT2 (GTS)	1:36.280	Emmanuel Clérico	Chrysler Viper GTS-R	1999 500 km of Valencia
GT2	1:36.469	Michele Maceratesi	Ferrari F430 GTC	2008 Valencia International GT Open round
World SSP	1:36.865	Cal Crutchlow	Yamaha YZF-R6	2009 Valencia World SSP round
Moto3	1:37.715	Álvaro Carpe	KTM RC250GP	2025 Valencian Community motorcycle Grand Prix
GT4	1:38.502	Robert Cronin	Porsche 718 Cayman GT4 RS Clubsport	2024 Valencia Porsche Sprint Challenge Southern Europe round
125cc	1:39.380	Héctor Faubel	Aprilia RSA 125	2007 Valencian Community motorcycle Grand Prix
Sportbike	1:39.717	Hugo De Cancellis	Kawasaki Ninja ZX-6R 636	2026 Valencia ESBK Sportbike round
MotoE	1:40.234	Eric Granado	Energica Ego Corsa	2019 Valencian Community motorcycle Grand Prix
TCR Touring Car	1:40.423	Ruben Volt	Honda Civic Type R TCR (FL5)	2025 Valencia TCR Spain Winter Series round
Stock car racing	1:40.764	Alon Day	Chevrolet Camaro NASCAR	2020 Valencia NASCAR Whelen Euro Series round
Superstars Series	1:41.164	Andrea Bertolini	Maserati Quattroporte	2011 Valencia Superstars Series round
Super 2000	1:42.438	Augusto Farfus	Alfa Romeo 156 GTA Super 2000	2004 Valencia ETCC round
SEAT León Eurocup	1:45.331	Lourenço Beirão da Veiga	SEAT León Supercopa	2008 Valencia SEAT León Eurocup round
Supersport 300	1:45.370	Uriel Hidalgo	Kawasaki Ninja 400	2024 Valencia ESBK Supersport 300 round
Renault Clio Cup	1:50.396	Nicolas Milan	Renault Clio R.S. IV	2018 Valencia Renault Clio Cup France round
Toyota GR Cup	1:52.889	Himar Acosta	Toyota GR86	2026 Valencia Toyota GR Cup Spain round
Truck racing	2:03.078	Jose Rodrigues Eduardo	MAN TGX	2026 Valencia CECC round
External Circuit (1999–present): 3.136 km (1.949 mi)
Porsche Carrera Cup	1:15.919	Alvaro Bajo	Porsche 911 (992 I) GT3 Cup	2026 Valencia Porsche Sprint Challenge Iberica round
TCR Touring Car	1:19.571	Yann Ehrlacher	Geely Preface TCR	2026 Valencia TCR World Tour round
Renault Clio Cup	1:28.278	Daniel Losada	Renault Clio Cup V	2026 Valencia Copa Clio España round
Formula E Circuit (2021): 3.376 km (2.098 mi)
Formula E	1:30.081	Alexander Sims	Mahindra M7Electro	2021 Valencia ePrix
