= TCR European Endurance =

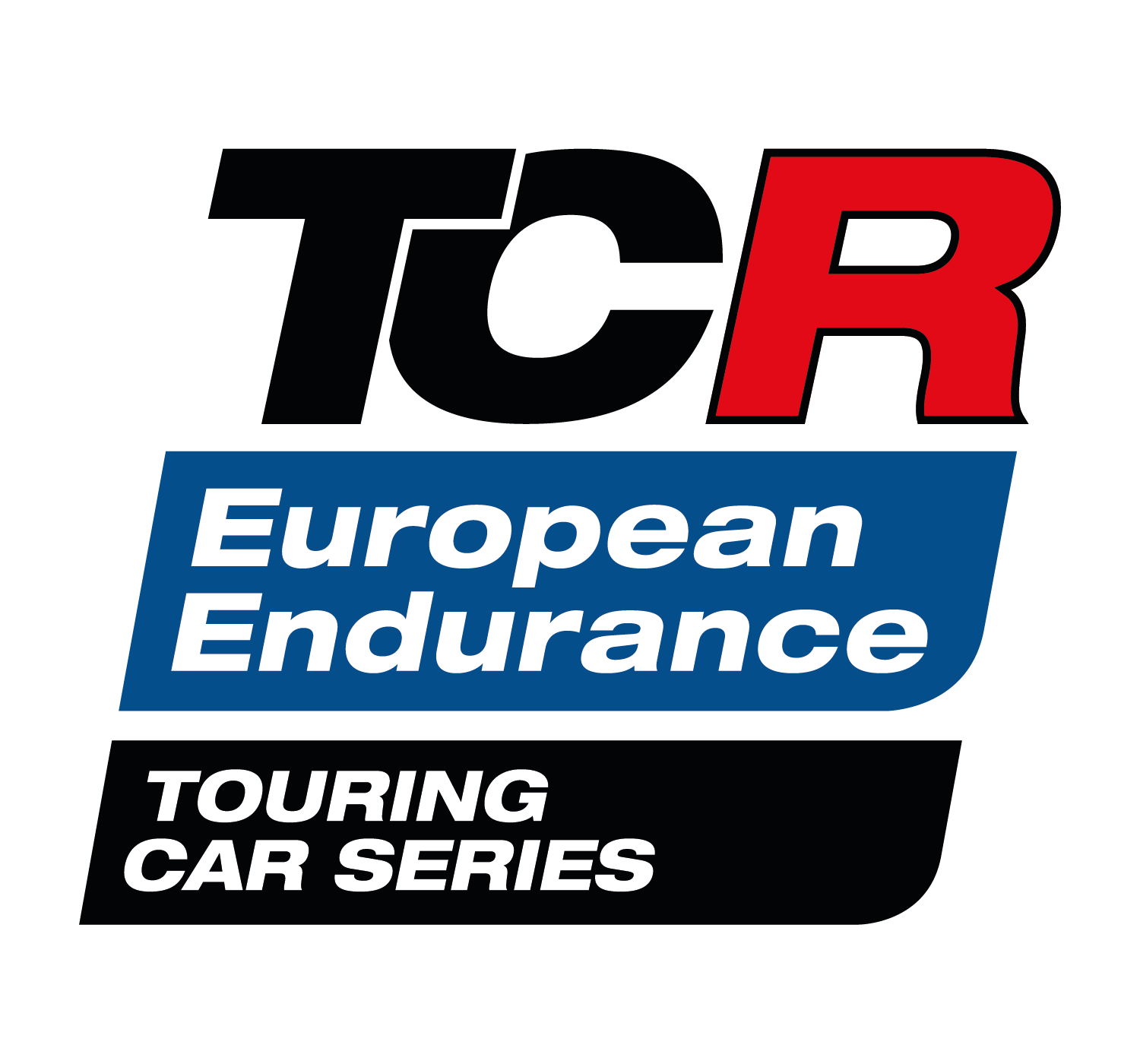
- Category: Touring cars
- Country: Europe
- Inaugural season: 2024
- Tyre suppliers: Kumho
- Drivers' champion: (Italy) Alessandro Lisi (Italy) Alessandro Berton
- Teams' champion: (Italy) BF Motorsport
- Official website: https://europeanendurance.tcr-series.com

The TCR European Endurance Touring Car Series is a touring car racing series consisting of two-hour endurance racing in Europe. It is promoted by RIZA International, and started in 2024.

== Format ==
The format consists of a two-hour race split into two 60-minute stages with a mandatory pit stop for the change of race driver and two tires supplied solely by Kumho. The race result is the sum of the two stages.

The grid for the first stage is determined by the sum of the fastest times set in two qualifying sessions of 15 minutes each, one for each of the two drivers. The grid for the second stage is determined by the results of the first stage. The race is streamed live on TCR TV and YouTube.

From 2026, the series will be part of the GTC Endurance Challenge. The format will be slightly revised, with races split into two 55-minute stages, each featuring a mandatory pit stop. Points will be awarded for qualifying, each stage and the combined overall result.

The championship will include TCR cars (split into sequential and DSG classes) alongside GT4 cars, introducing additional categories such as Silver, Pro-Am, AM and GTS.

== Organisation ==
The competition is promoted by Brazilian former race driver Maurício Slaviero, founder of RIZA International, co-promoter of TCR South America and TCR Brasil, and former promoter of the Brazilian Stock Cars series. With the help of Emanuele Maltese, a long-time race organization manager, the series expanded further in 2025.

== Champions ==
Year	Overall	Gen1	Gen2	DSG	Gentleman	Junior	Teams
2024	(Turkey) Turgut Konukoğlu & (Italy) Eric Brigliadori	(Turkey) Barkın Pınar		(Turkey) İbrahim Okyay & (Turkey) Seda Kaçan			(Turkey) Texaco Team AMS
2025	(Italy) Eric Scalvini & (Italy) Salvatore Tavano	(Turkey) İbrahim Okyay & (Turkey) Sinan Çiftçi	(Italy) Eric Scalvini & (Italy) Salvatore Tavano	(United Kingdom) Senna Summerbell	(Turkey) İbrahim Okyay	(Turkey) Berk Kalpaklıoğlu	(Austria) Wimmer Werk
2026	(Italy) Alessandro Lisi & (Italy) Alessandro Berton	(Turkey) Berk Kalpaklıoğlu	(Italy) Alessandro Lisi & (Italy) Alessandro Berton	(Italy) Paolo Palanti & (Italy) Cristian Carinci	(Italy) Pasquale Serratore	(Austria) Aaron Klug	Gen 2: (Italy) BF Motorsport Gen 1: (Turkey) Texaco Team AMS DSG: (Italy) Casals Motorsport

== Circuits ==
In 2024, four events were held, one in Hungary and three in Italy. In 2025, four events were held, one in Slovakia and three in Italy. There was a race in the Pannónia-Ring, but the race was postponed and ultimately cancelled. In 2026, four events were held, one in Slovakia, one in Spain and two in Italy. In 2027, four events are scheduled, one in Italy, one in Slovakia, one in Czech Repbulic and one in France.

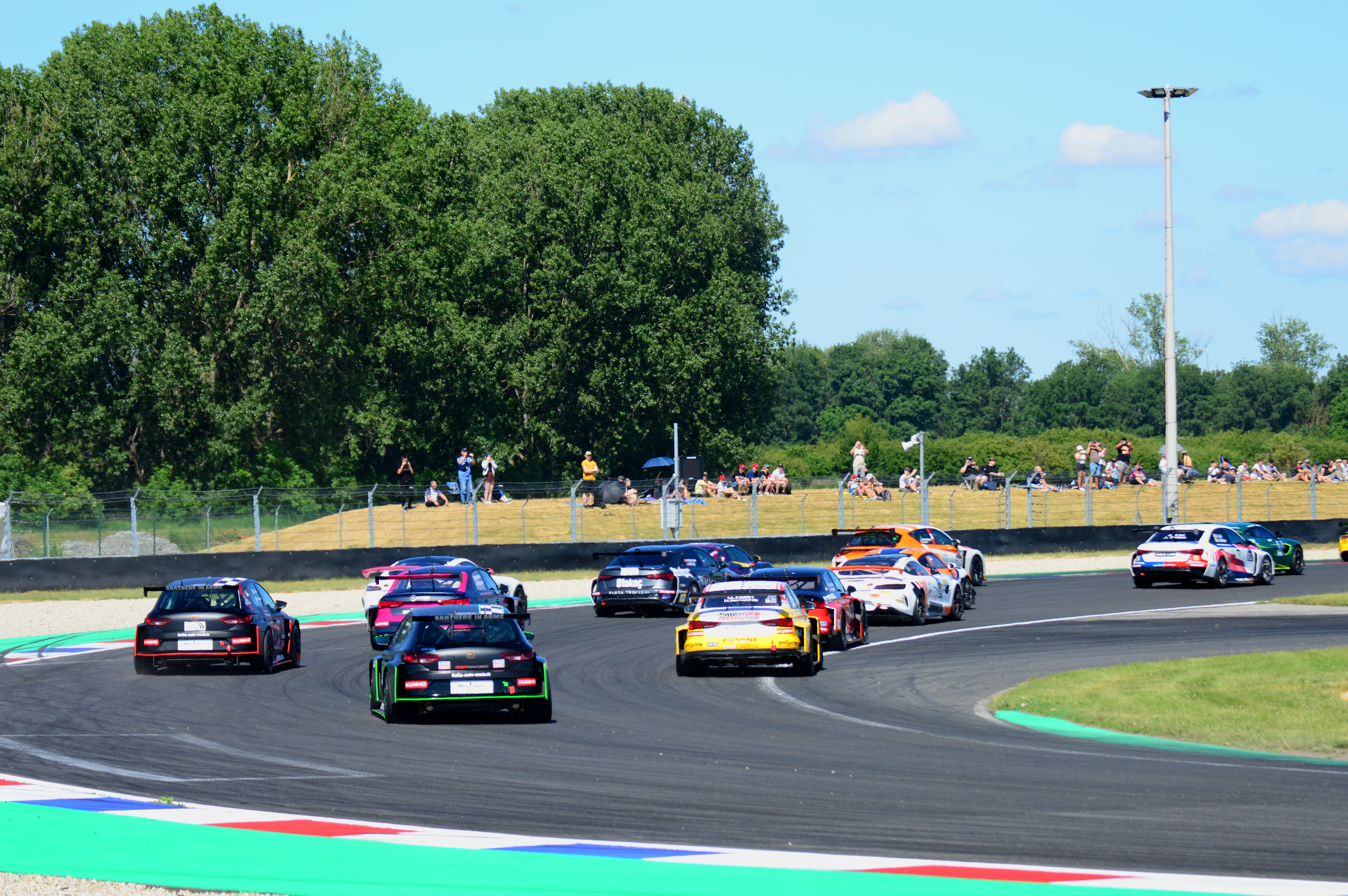
TCR European Endurance alongside GTC Endurance Challenge at the Slovakia Ring in June 2026.

- **Bold** denotes a circuit are used in the 2026 season.
- **Italic** denotes a future circuit will be used in the 2027 season.

Number	Circuits	Rounds	Years
1	(Italy) **Misano World Circuit**	4 (Note: Misano World Circuit Marco Simoncelli hosted 2 rounds in 2024.)	2024–present
2	(Italy) **Vallelunga Circuit**	3	2024–2026
3	**Slovakia Ring**	2	2025–present
4	(Hungary) Balaton Park Circuit	1	2024
4	(Italy) Mugello Circuit	1	2025
4	(Spain) **Circuit Ricardo Tormo**	1	2026
7	(Czech Republic) **Brno Circuit**	0	2027
7	(France) **Circuit Paul Ricard**	0	2027
