= Ruben Volt =

Estonian racing driver

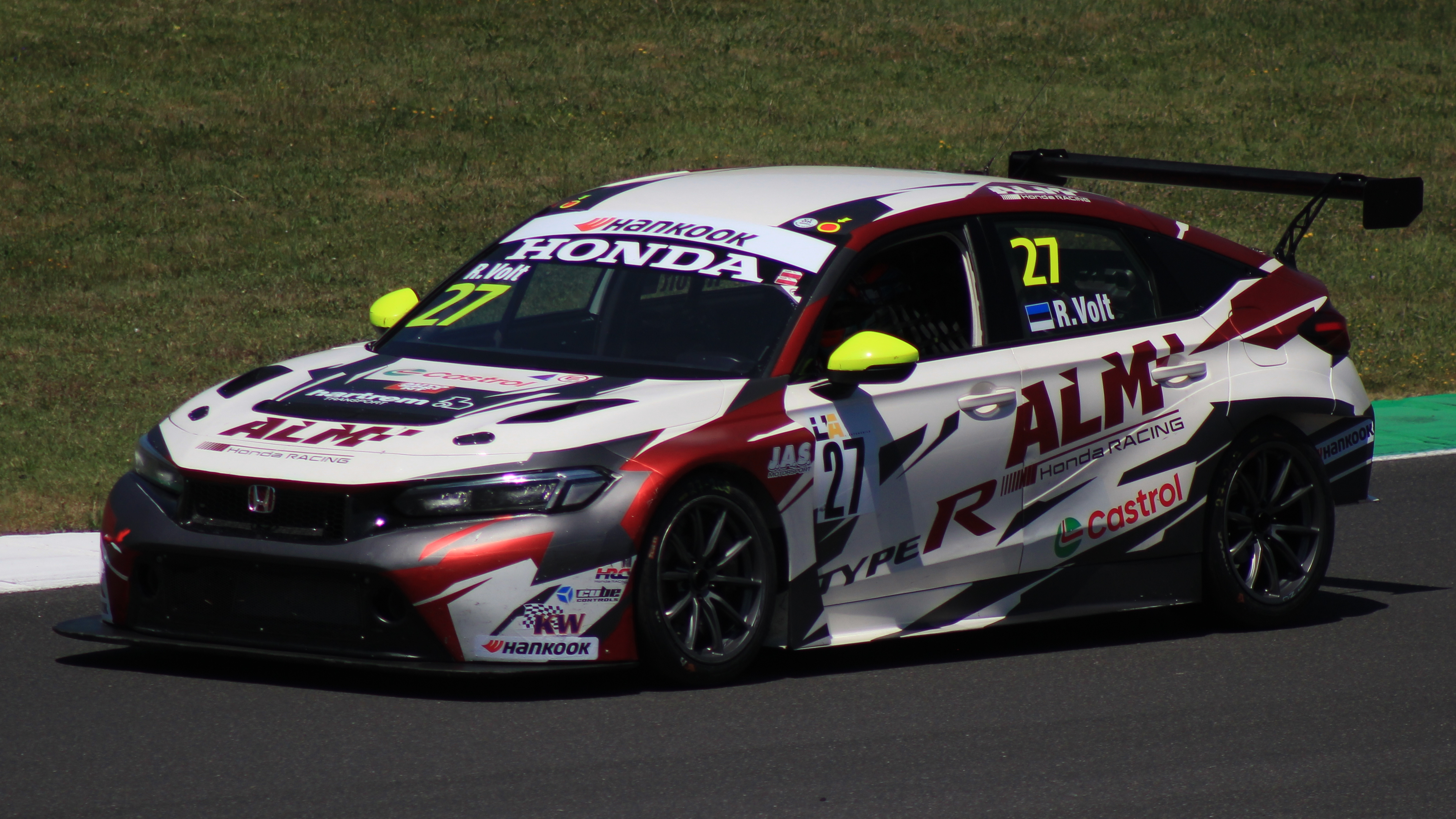
- Volt at Mugello Circuit in 2024
- Nationality: (Estonia) Estonian
- Born: March 19, 2006 (age 20) Estonia

TCR Europe Touring Car Series career
- Debut season: 2023
- Current team: ALM Motorsport
- Car number: 27
- Starts: 14
- Championships: 0
- Wins: 4
- Podiums: 7
- Poles: 1
- Fastest laps: 3
- Best finish: 9th in 2023

Previous series
- 2023: TCR World Tour

Ruben Volt (born 19 March 2006) is an Estonian racing driver who is competing in TCR Europe Touring Car Series and in TCR Italy with ALM Motorsport. Volt has also competed in TCR World Tour.

== Career ==
=== 2024 ===
In 2024, Volt continued his career in TCR Europe Touring Car Series and in TCR Italy with ALM Motorsport aiming the title. He was driving with Honda Civic Type R TCR. Volt got his first win in TCR Europe in Salzburgring which was his fourth podium of the year.

== Racing record ==
=== Career summary ===
Season	Series	Team	Races	Wins	Poles	F/Laps	Podiums	Points	Position
2021	TCR Italy Touring Car Championship	ALM Honda Racing	12	0	0	0	1	181	6th
2022	TCR Italy Touring Car Championship	ALM Honda Racing	12	0	1	0	3	241	4th
2023	TCR World Tour	ALM Motorsport	2	0	0	0	0	8	40th
2023	TCR Europe Touring Car Series	ALM Motorsport	8	2	1	3	2	171	9th
2023	TCR Italy Touring Car Championship	ALM Motorsport	10	0	1	0	1	201	7th
2023	TCR Spain Touring Car Championship	ALM Motorsport	2	1	1	0	2	85	9th
2024	TCR Europe Touring Car Series	ALM Motorsport	10	2	0	0	6	269	4th
2024	TCR Italy Touring Car Championship	ALM Motorsport	12	2	0	1	5	339	**3rd**
2024	TCR Winter Series	ALM Motorsport							
2024	Sports Car Championship Canada – TCR	M&S Racing	2	0	0	0	2	60	9th
2025	TCR Europe Touring Car Series	ALM Motorsport	12	2	2	1	3	176	5th
2025	TCR World Tour	ALM Motorsport	5	0	0	0	1	60	13th
2025	TCR Spain Touring Car Championship	ALM Motorsport	4	0	0	0	1	92	11th
2026	TCR Europe Touring Car Series	ALM Motorsport	12	1	0	2	3	185	4th
2026	TCR World Tour	ALM Motorsport							

=== Complete TCR Europe Touring Car Series results ===
(key) (Races in bold indicate pole position) (Races in italics indicate the fastest lap)

Year	Team	Car	1	2	3	4	5	6	7	8	9	10	11	12	13	14	DC	Points
2023	ALM Motorsport	Honda Civic Type R TCR (FL5)	ALG; 1	ALG; 2	PAU; 1	PAU; 2	SPA; 1	SPA; 2	HUN; 1; 21†	HUN; 2; 10	LEC; 1; 6^{7}	LEC; 2; 4	**MNZ**; **1**; 4^{1}	MNZ; 2; 1	CAT; 1; 13	CAT; 2; 1	9th	171
2024	ALM Motorsport	Honda Civic Type R TCR (FL5)	VAL; 1; 5^{5}	VAL; 2 Ret	ZOL; 1; 3^{3}	ZOL; 2; 2	SAL; 1; 3	SAL; 2; 1	SPA; 1; 1^{2}	SPA; 2; 7	BRN; 1	BRN; 2	CRT; 1; 14^{6}	CRT; 2; 2			4th	269

^{*} Season still in progress. ^{†} Driver did not finish the race, but was classified as he completed over 75% of the race distance.
