= 2022 TCR Italy Touring Car Championship =

The 2022 TCR Italy Touring Car Championship will be the eighth season of the ITCC to run under TCR regulations and the 36th season since the national touring car series was revived in 1987 as the Campionato Italiano Turismo.

== Calendar ==
| Round | Circuit | Location | Date |
|---|---|---|---|
| 1 | (Italy) Monza Circuit | Monza, Lombardy | 22–24 April |
| 2 | (Italy) Imola Circuit | Imola, Emilia-Romagna | 6–8 May |
| 3 | (Italy) Misano World Circuit Marco Simoncelli | Misano Adriatico, Province of Rimini, Emilia-Romagna | 3–5 June |
| 4 | (Italy) Mugello Circuit | Scarperia e San Piero, Tuscany | 15–17 July |
| 5 | (Italy) Imola Circuit | Imola, Emilia-Romagna | 2–4 September |
| 6 | (Italy) Vallelunga Circuit | Campagnano di Roma, Lazio | 16–18 September |

== Teams and Drivers ==
| Team | Car | No. | Drivers | Class | Rounds | Ref. |
|---|---|---|---|---|---|---|
| (Italy) Scuderia del Girasole CUPRA Racing | CUPRA León Competición TCR | 3 | (Italy) Raffaele Gurrieri | | All | |
| (Italy) Scuderia del Girasole CUPRA Racing | CUPRA León Competición TCR | 4 | (Italy) Salvatore Tavano | | All | |
| (Italy) Scuderia del Girasole CUPRA Racing | CUPRA León Competición TCR | 10 | (Italy) Federico Paolino | | 1, 3–4, 6 | |
| (Italy) Scuderia del Girasole CUPRA Racing | CUPRA León Competición TCR | 21 | (Italy) Nicola Guida | | All | |
| (Italy) MM Motorsport | Honda Civic Type R TCR (FK8) | 5 | (Italy) Manuel Bissa | | 2–5 | |
| (Italy) MM Motorsport | Honda Civic Type R TCR (FK8) | 14 | (Italy) Marco Iannotta | | All | |
| (Italy) MM Motorsport | Honda Civic Type R TCR (FK8) | 25 | (Italy) Paolo Rocca | | 6 | |
| (Italy) MM Motorsport | Honda Civic Type R TCR (FK8) | 33 | (Italy) Carlo Tamburini | | All | |
| (Italy) MM Motorsport | Honda Civic Type R TCR (FK8) | 62 | (United Kingdom) Jack Young | | 1 | |
| (Italy) Tecnodom Sport | Fiat Tipo TCR | 6 | (Italy) Jonathan Giacon | | 1–3 | |
| (Italy) Tecnodom Sport | Fiat Tipo TCR | 6 | (Italy) Luca Rangoni | | 4–5 | |
| (Italy) Tecnodom Sport | Audi RS 3 LMS TCR (2017) | 96 | (Italy) Steven Giacon | DSG | 1–5 | |
| (Italy) Bolza Corse | Audi RS 3 LMS TCR (2021) | 8 | (Italy) Denis Babuin | | All | |
| (Italy) BF Motorsport | Audi RS 3 LMS TCR (2017) | 9 | (Italy) Matteo Poloni | | 1 | |
| (Italy) BF Motorsport | Audi RS 3 LMS TCR (2021) | 9 | (Italy) Matteo Poloni | | 3–5 | |
| (Italy) BF Motorsport | CUPRA León TCR | 98 | (Italy) Matteo Bergonzini | | 5 | |
| (Italy) Trico WRT | Hyundai i30 N TCR | 11 | (Italy) Damiano Reduzzi | | 1–2, 5 | |
| (Italy) Trico WRT | Hyundai Elantra N TCR | 11 | (Italy) Damiano Reduzzi | | 3–4 | |
| (Spain) RC2 Junior Team | Audi RS 3 LMS TCR (2021) | 12 | (Spain) Rubén Fernández | | 1–2, 4–6 | |
| (Spain) RC2 Junior Team | Audi RS 3 LMS TCR (2021) | 19 | (Spain) Felipe Fernández | | 5–6 | |
| (Spain) RC2 Junior Team | Audi RS 3 LMS TCR (2021) | 41 | (Spain) Victor Fernández | | 3 | |
| (Spain) RC2 Junior Team | CUPRA León Competición TCR | 19 | (Spain) Felipe Fernández | | 1–4 | |
| (Spain) RC2 Junior Team | CUPRA León Competición TCR | 37 | (Venezuela) Sergio Lopez Bolotin | | All | |
| (Spain) RC2 Junior Team | CUPRA León Competición TCR | 41 | (Spain) Victor Fernández | | 5–6 | |
| (Italy) Next Motorsport | Hyundai i30 N TCR | 13 | (Italy) Emanuele Romani | | 2 | |
| (Italy) Next Motorsport | Hyundai i30 N TCR | 46 | (Italy) Marco Butti | | 2 | |
| (Italy) Élite Motorsport | Audi RS 3 LMS TCR (2021) | 15 | (Italy) Nicola Baldan | | 5–6 | |
| (Italy) Élite Motorsport | Audi RS 3 LMS TCR (2017) | 85 | (Italy) Rodolfo Massaro | DSG | All | |
| (Italy) Élite Motorsport | Audi RS 3 LMS TCR (2017) | 90 | (Italy) Mauro Trentin | DSG | All | |
| (France) Team Clairet Sport | Peugeot 308 TCR | 16 | (France) Jimmy Clairet | | 5–6 | |
| (France) Team Clairet Sport | CUPRA León Competición TCR | 18 | (France) Stéphane Ventaja | | 5–6 | |
| (France) Team Clairet Sport | Audi RS 3 LMS TCR (2017) | 67 | (France) Stéphane Ventaja | | 1–2 | |
| (France) Team Clairet Sport | CUPRA León TCR | 66 | (France) Gilles Colombani | | 1–3, 6 | |
| (Italy) Target Competition | Hyundai i30 N TCR | 20 | (Italy) Francesca Raffaele | | 1–5 | |
| (Italy) Target Competition | Hyundai i30 N TCR | 56 | (Italy) Cesare Brusa | | All | |
| (Italy) Target Competition | Hyundai Elantra N TCR | 22 | (Netherlands) Niels Langeveld | | All | |
| (Estonia) ALM Honda Racing | Honda Civic Type R TCR (FK8) | 23 | (Estonia) Mattias Vahtel | | All | |
| (Estonia) ALM Honda Racing | Honda Civic Type R TCR (FK8) | 27 | (Estonia) Ruben Volt | | All | |
| (Estonia) ALM Honda Racing | Honda Civic Type R TCR (FK8) | 39 | (Estonia) Antti Rammo | | All | |
| (Italy) Hyundai N Team Aggressive Italia | Hyundai Elantra N TCR | 24 | (Italy) Luca Lorenzini | | 2 | |
| (Italy) Hyundai N Team Aggressive Italia | Hyundai Elantra N TCR | 31 | (Italy) Kevin Ceccon | | 1, 3–4 | |
| (Italy) Hyundai N Team Aggressive Italia | Hyundai Elantra N TCR | 34 | (Italy) Mirko Zanardini | | 5–6 | |
| (Italy) Hyundai N Team Aggressive Italia | Hyundai Elantra N TCR | 64 | (Hungary) Levente Losonczy | | 5–6 | |
| (Italy) Hyundai N Team Aggressive Italia | Hyundai Elantra N TCR | 75 | (Italy) Mauro Guastamacchia | | 3 | |
| (Italy) Hyundai N Team Aggressive Italia | Hyundai i30 N TCR | 74 | (Italy) Edoardo Cappello | | 1–3, 5–6 | |
| (Italy) PMA Motorsport | Hyundai Elantra N TCR | 32 | (Italy) Felice Jelmini | | 5 | |
| (Italy) CRM Motorsport | Hyundai i30 N TCR | 44 | (Italy) Michele Imberti | | 1–5 | |
| (Italy) CRM Motorsport | Hyundai i30 N TCR | 47 | (Italy) Ettore Carminati | | 1–5 | |
| (Czech Republic) K2 Engine | Hyundai i30 N TCR | 59 | (Czech Republic) Dushan Kouril Jr. | | 4 | |
| (Slovenia) Scuderia Ghermandi by Lema Racing | CUPRA León Competición TCR | 61 | (Italy) Giacomo Ghermandi | | 2, 5–6 | |
| (Italy) Greta Racing Lucania | Audi RS 3 LMS TCR (2017) | 69 | (Italy) Francesco Savoia | | 3–4 | |
| (Italy) SP Competition | CUPRA León Competición TCR | 77 | (France) Sylvain Pussier | | All | |
| (Italy) DMP Motors / Scuderia Vesuvio | CUPRA León TCR | 81 | (Italy) Sabatino Di Mare | DSG | All | |
| (Italy) Ten Job | CUPRA León TCR | 97 | (Italy) Mauro Guidetti | DSG | 6 | |
| (Italy) 6ix Engineers | CUPRA León TCR | 99 | (Italy) Giorgio Fantilli | DSG | 1, 3–5 | |
| (Italy) Pro Race | CUPRA León TCR | 99 | (Italy) Giorgio Fantilli | DSG | 6 | |

| Icon | Class |
|---|---|
| DSG | DSG Challenge |

== Results ==
| Rnd. | | Circuit | Date | Pole position | Fastest lap | Winning driver | Winning team | DSG Winner | Info |
|---|---|---|---|---|---|---|---|---|---|
| 1 | 1 | Autodromo Nazionale Monza, Monza | 22–24 April | (Italy) Denis Babuin | (Italy) Denis Babuin | (Netherlands) Niels Langeveld | (Italy) Target Competition | (Italy) Mauro Trentin | |
| 1 | 2 | Autodromo Nazionale Monza, Monza | 22–24 April | | (Italy) Salvatore Tavano | (Italy) Salvatore Tavano | (Italy) Scuderia del Girasole CUPRA Racing | (Italy) Sabatino Di Mare | |
| 2 | 3 | Autodromo Enzo e Dino Ferrari, Imola | 6–8 May | (Estonia) Ruben Volt | (Italy) Carlo Tamburini | (Italy) Carlo Tamburini | (Italy) MM Motorsport | (Italy) Rodolfo Massaro | |
| 2 | 4 | Autodromo Enzo e Dino Ferrari, Imola | 6–8 May | | (Estonia) Mattias Vahtel | (Spain) Rubén Fernández | (Spain) RC2 Junior Team | (Italy) Rodolfo Massaro | |
| 3 | 5 | Misano World Circuit Marco Simoncelli, Misano Adriatico | 3–5 June | (Italy) Salvatore Tavano | (Italy) Salvatore Tavano | (Italy) Salvatore Tavano | (Italy) Scuderia del Girasole CUPRA Racing | (Italy) Sabatino Di Mare | |
| 3 | 6 | Misano World Circuit Marco Simoncelli, Misano Adriatico | 3–5 June | | (Italy) Michele Imberti | (Italy) Michele Imberti | (Italy) CRM Motorsport | (Italy) Sabatino Di Mare | |
| 4 | 7 | Mugello Circuit, Scarperia | 15–17 July | (Netherlands) Niels Langeveld | (Netherlands) Niels Langeveld | (Italy) Salvatore Tavano | (Italy) Scuderia del Girasole CUPRA Racing | (Italy) Steven Giacon | |
| 4 | 8 | Mugello Circuit, Scarperia | 15–17 July | | (Italy) Denis Babuin | (Netherlands) Niels Langeveld | (Italy) Target Competition | (Italy) Steven Giacon | |
| 5 | 9 | Autodromo Enzo e Dino Ferrari, Imola | 2–4 September | (Italy) Marco Iannotta | (Estonia) Mattias Vahtel | (Netherlands) Niels Langeveld | (Italy) Target Competition | (Italy) Steven Giacon | |
| 5 | 10 | Autodromo Enzo e Dino Ferrari, Imola | 2–4 September | | (Italy) Carlo Tamburini | (Italy) Denis Babuin | (Italy) Bolza Corse | (Italy) Rodolfo Massaro | |
| 6 | 11 | ACI Vallelunga Circuit, Campagnano di Roma | 16–18 September | (Netherlands) Niels Langeveld | (Netherlands) Niels Langeveld | (Netherlands) Niels Langeveld | (Italy) Target Competition | (Italy) Sabatino Di Mare | |
| 6 | 12 | ACI Vallelunga Circuit, Campagnano di Roma | 16–18 September | | (Spain) Felipe Fernández | (Spain) Felipe Fernández | (Spain) RC2 Junior Team | (Italy) Sabatino Di Mare | |

=== Drivers' Championship ===
Scoring systems

| Position | **1st** | **2nd** | **3rd** | **4th** | **5th** | **6th** | **7th** | **8th** | **9th** | **10th** | **11th** | **12th** | **13th** | **14th** | **15th** |
| Qualifying | 10 | 9 | 8 | 7 | 6 | 5 | 4 | 3 | 2 | 1 | —N/a | | | | |
| Race | 40 | 35 | 30 | 27 | 24 | 21 | 18 | 15 | 13 | 11 | 9 | 7 | 5 | 3 | 1 |

| Pos. | Driver | MNZ (Italy) | | IMO1 (Italy) | | MIS (Italy) | | MUG (Italy) | | IMO2 (Italy) | | VAL (Italy) | | Pts. |
| Pos. | Driver | RC1 | RC2 | RC1 | RC2 | RC1 | RC2 | RC1 | RC2 | RC1 | RC2 | RC1 | RC2 | Pts. |
|---|---|---|---|---|---|---|---|---|---|---|---|---|---|---|
| 1 | (Netherlands) Niels Langeveld | 1^{2} | Ret | 7^{2} | 6 | 7^{7} | 2 | **17^{1}** | 1 | 1^{2} | 4 | **1^{1}** | 3 | 381 (390) |
| 2 | (Italy) Salvatore Tavano | 4^{5} | 1 | 2^{9} | 8 | **1^{1}** | 25 | 1^{3} | 4 | 4^{5} | 2 | 14 | Ret | 344 (347) |
| 3 | (Italy) Denis Babuin | **25^{1}** | 5 | 16^{4} | 24† | 8^{6} | 4 | 4^{6} | 3 | Ret^{6} | 1 | 4^{6} | 9 | 271 |
| 4 | (Estonia) Ruben Volt | 5^{9} | 7 | **3^{1}** | 4 | 11 | 26† | 25† | 13 | DNS^{9} | 9 | 3^{2} | 2 | 241 |
| 5 | (Italy) Carlo Tamburini | 11^{3} | 11 | 1^{3} | 5 | Ret | Ret | 27^{7}† | 9 | 3^{3} | 18 | 5^{5} | 13 | 216 |
| 6 | (Italy) Cesare Brusa | 10 | 20 | 13 | 22 | 5^{3} | 7 | 2^{2} | 5 | 9 | 3 | Ret | Ret | 205 |
| 7 | (Spain) Felipe Fernández | Ret | 8 | Ret | 7 | 9^{9} | 5 | 6 | 10 | 17 | 22 | 7^{4} | 1 | 186 |
| 8 | (Italy) Marco Iannotta | 7^{8} | 6 | 26 | 15 | 2^{4} | 6 | 9 | 17 | **2^{1}** | 27† | DNS | Ret | 182 |
| 9 | (Italy) Michele Imberti | 14 | 14 | 17^{7} | 2 | 6^{8} | 1 | 3^{10} | Ret | 10^{10} | Ret | | | 172 |
| 10 | (Estonia) Mattias Vathel | 16^{10} | 13 | 6^{10} | Ret | 12 | 9 | 26† | 11 | 6^{4} | 5 | 8^{9} | 6 | 168 |
| 11 | (Spain) Rubén Fernández | 12 | 9 | 5^{8} | 1 | | | Ret^{9} | 7 | 13 | 14 | 10^{8} | 14 | 151 |
| 12 | (Estonia) Antti Rammo | 8 | 12 | 4 | 23† | 24 | 10 | 23 | 26† | 8 | 8 | Ret | 16 | 109 |
| 13 | (France) Sylvain Pussier | 17^{7} | 4 | 9 | 10 | Ret | 27† | 11 | 15 | 19 | 25 | 6^{7} | 24 | 105 |
| 14 | (Venezuela) Sergio Lopez Bolotin | 13 | 19 | Ret | 11 | Ret | 12 | 7 | 27† | 14 | 10 | 11^{10} | 11 | 78 |
| 15 | (Italy) Ettore Carminati | 23 | 22 | 10 | Ret | 10 | Ret | 10 | 6 | DNQ | Ret | | | 56 |
| 16 | (Italy) Raffaele Guerrieri | 18 | 17 | 11 | 17 | 17 | 11 | 13 | 23 | 16 | 12 | Wth | 10 | 44 |
| 17 | (France) Stephane Ventaja | 28† | Ret | 15 | 16 | | | | | 12 | 11 | 12 | 7 | 42 |
| 18 | (Italy) Francesca Raffaele | 20 | 23 | 12 | 13 | Ret^{10} | Ret | 8 | 12 | 15 | 23 | | | 41 |
| 19 | (Italy) Edoardo Cappello | 27† | 18 | 8 | 18 | 14 | 28† | | | 29 | 13 | 13 | 15 | 29 |
| - | (Italy) Sabatino di Mare | Ret | 26 | EX | 25† | 16 | 21 | 22 | 21 | 22 | 28† | 16 | 18 | 0 |
| - | (Italy) Rodolfo Massaro | Ret | 27 | 18 | 19 | 20 | 23 | 28† | 25 | 25 | 17 | 20 | 21 | 0 |
| - | (Italy) Mauro Trentin | 21 | 28 | 22 | 20 | 18 | 22 | 18 | 22 | 23 | 24 | 21 | 23 | 0 |
| - | (Italy) Steven Giacon | 22 | 30† | 19 | Ret | Ret | 24 | 16 | 20 | 21 | Ret | | | 0 |
| - | (Italy) Giorgio Fantilli | 24 | 29 | | | 21 | Ret | 20 | 24 | 28 | 21 | 23 | 22 | 0 |
Ineligible for championship
| - | (Italy) Kevin Ceccon | 3^{4} | 3 | | | 3^{5} | 3 | 5^{5} | 2 | | | | | (212) |
| - | (Italy) Matteo Poloni | Ret | 15 | | | 4^{2} | 8 | Ret^{4} | 14 | Ret^{7} | 6 | | | (102) |
| - | (Italy) Nicola Baldan | | | | | | | | | 7 | 26† | 2^{3} | 4 | (98) |
| - | (France) Jimmy Clairet | | | | | | | | | 5 | 7 | 9 | 5 | (83) |
| - | (United Kingdom) Jack Young | 2^{6} | 2 | | | | | | | | | | | (80) |
| - | (Italy) Manuel Bissa | | | 24^{5} | 3 | 15 | 15 | 21 | 18 | 11 | Ret | | | (54) |
| - | (Italy) Domiano Reduzzi | 6 | 25 | Ret | DNS | 25† | 13 | 24^{8} | 8 | 18 | DNS | | | (50) |
| - | (Italy) Jonatan Giacon | 9 | 10 | Ret^{6} | DNS | Ret | 19 | | | | | | | (36) |
| - | (Italy) Federico Paolino | 26 | 21 | | | 13 | 14 | 12 | 19 | | | DNS | 8 | (30) |
| - | (France) Gilles Colombani | 19 | 16 | Ret | 12 | Ret | 16 | | | | | 17 | 12 | (14) |
| - | (Italy) Giacomo Ghermandi | | | 23 | 9 | | | | | 31 | INF | Ret | WD | (14) |
| - | (Italy) Felice Jelmini | | | | | | | | | 32^{8} | Ret | | | (7) |
| - | (Italy) Luca Lorenzini | | | 14 | 14 | | | | | | | | | (6) |
| - | (Italy) Francesco Savoia | | | | | 23 | 20 | 14 | Ret | | | | | (3) |
| - | (Czech Republic) Dushan Kouril Jr. | | | | | | | Ret | DNS | | | | | (2) |
| - | (Italy) Nicola Guida | 15 | 24 | 20 | Ret | 19 | 17 | 19 | Ret | 24 | 20 | 24 | 17 | (1) |
| - | (Hungary) Levente Losonczy | | | | | | | | | 20 | 16 | 15 | Ret | (1) |
| - | (Italy) Luca Rangoni | | | | | | | 15 | 16 | 30 | Ret | | | (1) |
| - | (Italy) Mirko Zanardini | | | | | | | | | 26 | 15 | 19 | 19 | (1) |
| - | (Italy) Mauro Guastamacchia | | | | | Ret | 18 | | | | | | | (0) |
| - | (Spain) Víctor Fernández | | | | | 22 | Ret | | | Ret | 19 | 18 | 20 | (0) |
| - | (Italy) Emanuele Romani | | | 21 | 21 | | | | | | | | | (0) |
| - | (Italy) Mauro Guidetti | | | | | | | | | | | 22 | DNS | (0) |
| - | (Italy) Marco Butti | | | 25 | Ret | | | | | | | | | (0) |
| - | (Italy) Matteo Bergonzini | | | | | | | | | 27 | Ret | | | (0) |
| - | (Italy) Paolo Rocca | | | | | | | | | | | Ret | Ret | (0) |
| Pos. | Driver | MNZ (Italy) | | IMO1 (Italy) | | MIS (Italy) | | MUG (Italy) | | IMO2 (Italy) | | VAL (Italy) | | Pts. |

| Colour | Result |
|---|---|
| Gold | Winner |
| Silver | Second place |
| Bronze | Third place |
| Green | Points classification |
| Blue | Non-points classification |
| Blue | Non-classified finish (NC) |
| Purple | Retired, not classified (Ret) |
| Red | Did not qualify (DNQ) |
| Red | Did not pre-qualify (DNPQ) |
| Black | Disqualified (DSQ) |
| White | Did not start (DNS) |
| White | Withdrew (WD) |
| White | Race cancelled (C) |
| Blank | Did not practice (DNP) |
| Blank | Did not arrive (DNA) |
| Blank | Excluded (EX) |

**Bold** – Pole
Italics – Fastest Lap
