= Norsk Soyamelfabrikk =

Defunct soy processing factory in Norway

Coordinates: 59°02′44″N 10°02′38″E

Norsk Soyamelfabrikk ('Norwegian Soy Flour Factory') was a soy flour manufacturing company in Larvik, Norway. It was the first soy flour plant in Norway. The factory was in operation between 1933 and 1977. It was locally nicknamed 'Soyaen' ("The Soy").

== Founding of the company ==
In August 1932 the local newspaper Jarlsberg og Larviks Amtstidende reported that a new soy flour plant would be operational from November 1932 and the design would be inspired by the Hansa Mühle AG plant in Hamburg. The founding assembly of the company was held on March 4, 1933. The founding board consisted of lawyer Sverre Prydz, trader O. Sæther and Dr. S. Wetterstad, with consul Rolf Nielsen and trader Knai as alternate members. The factory was established on the former premises of the Larvik Glass Factory. The offices of the company were established in Oslo. The company bought the stranded ship SS «Pehr Ugland», and used the metals of the old barge for the factory installations. After a period of test runs, the first soy flour shipment from the plant took place on October 6, 1933. By November 1, 1933 the plant was fully operational, and by the end of the year, some 50 to 60 tonnes were processed daily and the plant employed 25 people. Around 1936 extensive expansion works took place at the plant.

== World War II ==
During World War II an armed resistance group was based among the workers of the factory. The communist worker Edvin Lindh was one of the leaders of the group.

== Crisis in late 1950s and early 1960s ==
In the summer of 1958 the company announced that some 45-50 workers would be placed on leave of absence for about ten weeks, and that the factory would resume normal functions after this period. This was the first time in 25 years the company had resorted to such a measure. As of the early 1960s the company was at a verge of collapse, but changing consumer preferences shifting from animal to plant-based margarine meant the company would eventually recover.

== 1960s and 1970s ==
Norsk Soyamelfabrikk held its 30th anniversary celebrations in February 1964. Foreman Johannes Larsen and in his speech highlighted that during its three decades, the factory had not seen conflicts or strikes. At the event 20 employees (including Johannes Larsen and Edvin Lindh) that had worked at the company since its inception were awarded Norges Vel medals for loyal service. At the time Christian Østberg was the chair of the board of the company. As of the mid-1960s it was one of three soy bean plants in the country. It had a storage capacity of 750,000 bushels. The factory had its on pier in the Larvik port, 50 meters long and with a depth of 3 to 11 meters. As of the 1960s and 1970s Nils Jacob Østberg was the director of the company. In January 1967 the company moved its head office from Oslo to Larvik.

In 1969 the company had a 14% annual increase in production, and had a 90 million Norwegian krona turnover. The increased demand for soy flour had been provoked by a low yield in herring fishing that year. In a 1970 article in the Communist Party organ Friheten, the factory was labelled a 'worker-friendly island' and the introduction of five shifts, average work week of 33.16 hours and fixed monthly salaries were framed as gains resulting from the efforts of the workers and their trade union representatives. The factory foreman, Larsen, was also the chair of the Larvik section of the Norwegian Union of Chemical Industry Workers and a local leader of the Communist Party.

In 1971 the company announced that it would initiate the construction of a 1,500 square meter storage facility at an acquired plot. On April 26, 1971 a major fire broke out at the factory, following an explosion in an electric oven. No workers were injured but goods worth around 500,000 Norwegian krona were destroyed.

== Aftermath ==
The factory closed down in 1977. The facilities were later taken over by the truck freight company Blomquist Transport, which was met by protests from neighbouring communities complaining on heavy traffic near residential areas. In 2000 it was announced that the old factory buildings would be torn down and replaced by residential areas.
