= Antti Rammo =

Estonian racing driver (born 1983)

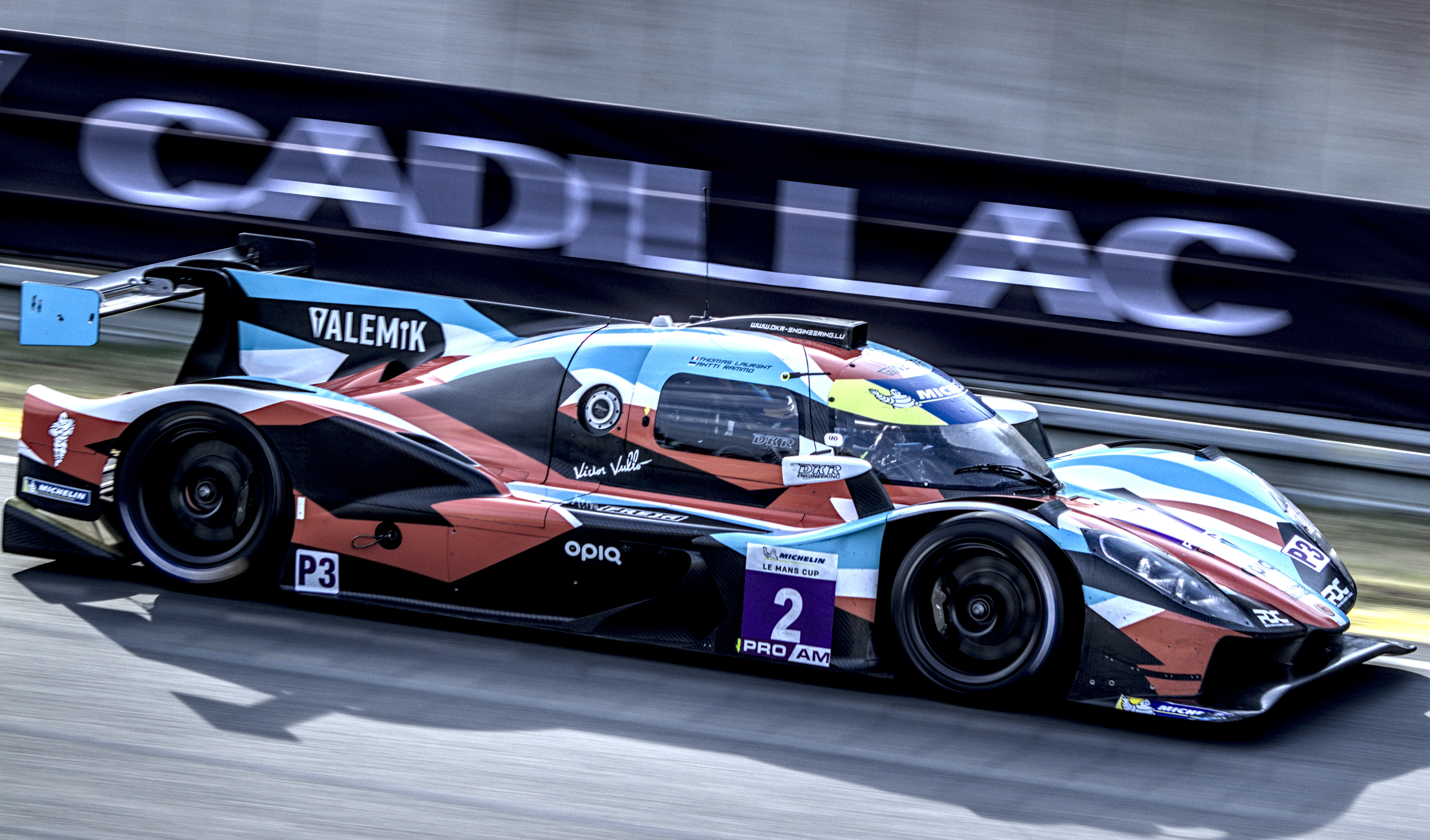
- Rammo in 2025
- Nationality: (Estonia) Estonian
- Born: 28 January 1983 (age 43) Tallinn, then part of Estonian SSR, Soviet Union
- Categorisation: FIA Bronze

Championship titles
- 2024 2014: Prototype Cup Germany – Trophy; Formula Scandic

Antti Rammo (born 28 January 1983) is an Estonian racing driver who last competed in the LMP3 class of the European Le Mans Series for DKR Engineering.

== Career ==
Rammo began karting at the age of 22, competing until 2023. In his time in karts, Rammo most notably won the 2014 Estonian Karting Championship in the KZ2 class. In 2009, Rammo joined Scuderia Nordica to make his single-seater debut, primarily racing in Formula Renault 2.0 Finland and the Formula Renault 2.0 North European Zone. After finishing sixth in both series, Rammo joined P1 Motorsport for a similar campaign the following year. Despite a switch to T.T. Racing mid-season, Rammo finished third in the Finnish series and seventh in NEZ, scoring a best result of fourth twice in both series. The following year, Rammo joined Stromos ArtLine to compete in the German Formula Three Championship, in which he scored a best result of seventh in race two at Assen en route to a 17th-place points finish. In 2014, Rammo briefly returned to single-seaters, racing for ALM Motorsport in Formula Scandic, in which he won the title at the finale in auto24ring.

Returning to full-time car racing in 2022, Rammo joined ALM Honda Racing to race in the TCR Italy Touring Car Championship. In his rookie year in the series, Rammo scored a best result of fourth in race one at Imola and five other points finishes to end the year 12th in the overall standings. During 2022, Rammo also raced in select rounds of the 24H TCE Series, as well as making a one-off appearance in the Middle East Trophy at the Dubai 24 Hour in the 992 Am class. Staying with ALM Motorsport for the following season of TCR Italy Touring Car Championship, Rammo scored a best result of 13th at Imola before leaving the team ahead of the third round at Mugello. Following that, Rammo made one-off appearances for MRS-GT Racing in the 24H GT Series and in the 2023–24 Middle East Trophy in the 992 Am class. Continuing with MRS GT-Racing in 2024, Rammo primarily raced in Prototype Cup Germany, scoring a lone win at Zandvoort, and a podium at the Nürburgring to end the year sixth in the overall standings, whilst also winning the Trophy class title. During 2024, Rammo also raced with the same team in select rounds of the 24H Series in the 992 class.

Remaining in LMP3 competition for 2025, Rammo joined DKR Engineering for his first season in the European Le Mans Series alongside Mikkel Gaarde Pedersen and Wyatt Brichacek. In the six-round series, the trio took their only podium at the season finale in Algarve by finishing third, en route to a 10th-place points finish. During 2025, Rammo also raced at the Road to Le Mans for the same team, winning race two in LMP3 Pro-Am, as Ginetta's first class win in the Le Mans Cup. Rammo remained with DKR Engineering to race in the following year's edition of the European Le Mans Series, once again in LMP3. In the team's first season with the Ligier JS P325, Rammo scored podiums at both Le Castellet and Algarve to take eighth in points. Towards the end of the year, Rammo partook in the ELMS rookie tests for DKR in LMP2 machinery. Following that, Rammo made his LMP2 debut in the 2026–27 Asian Le Mans Series for Duqueine Team.

== Karting record ==
=== Karting career summary ===
| Season | Series | Team | Position |
|---|---|---|---|
| 2006 | Rotax Max Challenge Estonia – Senior | | 6th |
| 2007 | Rotax Max Challenge Estonia – Senior | | 9th |
| 2007 | Baltic Rotax Max Challenge – Senior | | 14th |
| 2008 | Baltic Rotax Max Challenge – Senior | | 3rd |
| 2008 | Latvian Rotax Max Challenge – Senior | | 8th |
| 2008 | Latvian Karting Championship – Rotax Max Senior | | 6th |
| 2008 | Estonian Rotax Max Challenge – Senior | AGS Racing | 2nd |
| 2008 | Rotax Max Euro Challenge – Rotax Max | AGS Racing | NC |
| 2008 | Klippan Cup – Rotax Max | | 24th |
| 2009 | Estonian Karting Championship – KZ2 | | 4th |
| 2009 | Baltic Karting Championship – KZ2 | | 4th |
| 2009 | Latvian Karting Championship – KZ2 | | 5th |
| 2011 | Rotax Max Challenge Estonia – DD2 | | 10th |
| 2012 | Rotax Max Challenge Estonia – DD2 | | 4th |
| 2012 | Rotax International Open – DD2 | Aix Racing Team | 11th |
| 2013 | Rotax Max Wintercup – DD2 | Aix Racing Team | 5th |
| 2013 | Rotax Max Euro Challenge – DD2 | Aix Racing Team | 18th |
| 2018 | Estonian Karting Championship – KZ2 | | 6th |
| 2018 | IAME Euro Series – X30 Super Shifter | Eurokarting | 12th |
| 2019 | Estonian Karting Championship – KZ2 | TARK Racing | 4th |
| 2019 | Finnish Karting Championship – KZ2 | | 7th |
| 2020 | Estonian Karting Championship – KZ2 | | 3rd |
| 2020 | Andrea Margutti Trophy – KZ2 | LA Motorsport | 24th |
| 2021 | Estonian Karting Championship – KZ2 | | 4th |
| 2021 | Andrea Margutti Trophy – KZ2 | LA Motorsport | 11th |
| 2021 | South Garda Winter Cup – KZ2 | LA Motorsport | 30th |
| 2021 | Karting European Championship – KZ2 | Intrepid Driver Program | 82nd |
| 2023 | Estonian Karting Championship – KZ2 | | 6th |

== Racing record ==
=== Racing career summary ===
| Season | Series | Team | Races | Wins | Poles | F/Laps | Podiums | Points | Position |
|---|---|---|---|---|---|---|---|---|---|
| 2009 | Formula Renault 2.0 Finland | Scuderia Nordica | 10 | 0 | 0 | 0 | 1 | 159 | 6th |
| 2009 | Formula Renault 2.0 North European Zone | Scuderia Nordica | 8 | 0 | 0 | 0 | 0 | 67 | 6th |
| 2009 | Austria Formel Renault Cup | Scuderia Nordica | 2 | 0 | 1 | 0 | 0 | 4 | 20th |
| 2009 | Formula Renault 2.0 Sweden | Scuderia Nordica | 2 | 0 | 0 | 0 | 0 | 3 | 20th |
| 2009 | Formula Renault 2.0 Northern European Cup | Scuderia Nordica | 2 | 0 | 0 | 0 | 0 | 21 | 25th |
| 2010 | Formula Renault UK Winter Series | Koiranen Bros. Motorsport | 6 | 0 | 0 | 0 | 0 | 39 | 16th |
| 2010 | Formula Renault 2.0 North European Zone and Sweden | P1 Motorsport; T. T. Racing | 14 | 0 | 0 | 0 | 0 | 85 | 7th |
| 2010 | Formula Renault 2.0 Finland | P1 Motorsport; T. T. Racing | 12 | 0 | 0 | 0 | 0 | 65 | **3rd** |
| 2010 | Formula Renault 2.0 Northern European Cup – FR2000 | P1 Motorsport | 2 | 0 | 0 | 0 | 1 | 37 | 15th |
| 2011 | German Formula Three Championship | Stromos ArtLine | 14 | 0 | 0 | 0 | 0 | 2 | 17th |
| 2014 | Formula Scandic | ALM Motorsport | | | | | | | **1st** |
| 2022 | 24H TCE Series – TCR | Autorama Motorsport by Wolf-Power Racing | 1 | 0 | 0 | 0 | 1 | 38 | NC |
| 2022 | 24H TCE Series – TCR | NOKER Racing Team | 1 | 0 | 0 | 0 | 1 | 38 | NC |
| 2022 | TCR Italy Touring Car Championship | ALM Honda Racing | 12 | 0 | 0 | 0 | 0 | 109 | 12th |
| 2022–23 | Middle East Trophy – 992 Am | ALM Motorsport by MRS GT-Racing | 1 | 0 | 0 | 0 | 0 | 0 | NC |
| 2023 | TCR Italy Touring Car Championship | ALM Motorsport | 4 | 0 | 0 | 0 | 0 | 8 | NC |
| 2023 | 24H GT Series – 992 Am | MRS-GT Racing | 1 | 0 | 0 | 0 | 1 | 50 | NC |
| 2023–24 | Middle East Trophy – 992 Am | MRS GT-Racing | 1 | 0 | 0 | 0 | 0 | 12 | NC |
| 2024 | Prototype Cup Germany | MRS-GT Racing | 12 | 1 | 0 | 0 | 2 | 135 | 6th |
| 2024 | 24H Series – 992 | MRS-GT Racing | 2 | 0 | 0 | 1 | 0 | 43 | 22nd |
| 2025 | European Le Mans Series – LMP3 | DKR Engineering | 6 | 0 | 0 | 0 | 1 | 41 | 10th |
| 2025 | Le Mans Cup – LMP3 Pro-Am | DKR Engineering | 2 | 1 | 0 | 0 | 1 | 0 | NC† |
| 2026 | European Le Mans Series – LMP3 | DKR Engineering | 6 | 0 | 0 | 0 | 2 | 57 | 8th |
| 2026 | European Endurance Prototype Cup | DKR Engineering | 4 | 0 | 0 | 0 | 0 | 11.25* | 31st* |
| 2026 | Le Mans Cup – LMP3 Pro-Am | DKR Engineering | 1 | 0 | 0 | 0 | 1 | 0 | NC† |
| 2026–27 | Asian Le Mans Series – LMP2 | Duqueine Team | | | | | | | |

^{†} As Rammo was a guest driver, he was ineligible to score points.

=== Complete German Formula Three Championship results ===
(key) (Races in bold indicate pole position) (Races in italics indicate fastest lap)

| Year | Entrant | Chassis | Engine | 1 | 2 | 3 | 4 | 5 | 6 | 7 | 8 | 9 | 10 | 11 | 12 | 13 | 14 | 15 | 16 | 17 | 18 | Pos | Points |
|---|---|---|---|---|---|---|---|---|---|---|---|---|---|---|---|---|---|---|---|---|---|---|---|
| 2011 | Stromos ArtLine | Dallara F305 | OPC Challenge | OSC; 1; 15 | OSC; 2; 12 | SPA; 1; 15 | SPA; 2; 17 | SAC; 1 | SAC; 2 | ASS1; 1; 13 | ASS1; 2; 14 | ZOL; 1; 9 | ZOL; 2; 14 | RBR; 1; 13 | RBR; 2; 15 | LAU; 1 | LAU; 2 | ASS2; 1; 14 | ASS2; 2; 7 | HOC; 1; 14 | HOC; 2; 12 | 17th | 2 |

=== Complete TCR Italy Touring Car Championship results ===
(key) (Races in bold indicate pole position) (Races in italics indicate fastest lap)

| Year | Team | Car | 1 | 2 | 3 | 4 | 5 | 6 | 7 | 8 | 9 | 10 | 11 | 12 | DC | Points |
|---|---|---|---|---|---|---|---|---|---|---|---|---|---|---|---|---|
| 2022 | ALM Honda Racing | Honda Civic Type R TCR (FK8) | MNZ; 1; 8 | MNZ; 2; 12 | IMO1; 1; 4 | IMO1; 2; 23† | MIS; 1; 24 | MIS; 2; 10 | MUG; 1; 23 | MUG; 2; 26† | IMO2; 1; 8 | IMO2; 2; 8 | VAL; 1 Ret | VAL; 2; 16 | 12th | 109 |
| 2023 | ALM Motorsport | Honda Civic Type R TCR (FK8) | IMO1; 1; 13 | IMO1; 2; 14 | MIS1; 1; 26 | MIS1; 2; 24 | MUG; 1 | MUG; 2 | MNZ; 1 | MNZ; 2 | VAL; 1 | VAL; 2 | IMO2; 1 | IMO2; 2 | NC | 8 |

=== Complete Prototype Cup Germany results ===
(key) (Races in bold indicate pole position) (Races in italics indicate fastest lap)

| Year | Team | Car | Engine | 1 | 2 | 3 | 4 | 5 | 6 | 7 | 8 | 9 | 10 | 11 | 12 | 13 | 14 | DC | Points |
|---|---|---|---|---|---|---|---|---|---|---|---|---|---|---|---|---|---|---|---|
| 2024 | MRS GT-Racing | Ligier JS P320 | Nissan VK56DE 5.6 L V8 | SPA; 1 C | SPA; 2 C | LAU; 1; 5 | LAU; 2; 4 | LAU; 3; 7 | ZAN; 1; 1 | ZAN; 2; 6 | HOC; 1; 6 | HOC; 2; 4 | HOC; 3; 4 | NÜR; 1 Ret | NÜR; 2; 3 | SAC; 1; 5 | SAC; 2 Ret | 6th | 135 |

=== Complete European Le Mans Series results ===
(key) (Races in bold indicate pole position; results in italics indicate fastest lap)

| Year | Entrant | Class | Chassis | Engine | 1 | 2 | 3 | 4 | 5 | 6 | Rank | Points |
|---|---|---|---|---|---|---|---|---|---|---|---|---|
| 2025 | DKR Engineering | LMP3 | Ginetta G61-LT-P3 Evo | Toyota V35A 3.5 L V6 | CAT; Ret | LEC; 5 | IMO; 8 | SPA; 8 | MUG; 6 | ALG; 3 | 10th | 41 |
| 2026 | DKR Engineering | LMP3 | Ligier JS P325 | Toyota V35A 3.5 L V6 | CAT; 9 | **LEC**; 3 | IMO; 5 | SPA; 6 | SIL; 7 | ALG; 3 | 8th | 57 |
