= Seda Kaçan =

Turkish racing driver (born 1993)

- Born: 06.01.1993 Kırklareli, Turkey

2023 Turkish Racetrack Championship career
- Debut season: 2022
- Current team: Texaco Team AMS
- Car number: 5
- Former teams: Bitci Racing Team AMS
- Starts: 4
- Wins: 1
- Podiums: 2
- Best finish: 1st in 2023

Seda Kaçan (born 1993) is a Turkish racing driver. She is the country's second female car racing driver after Ann Tahincioğlu, who competed in 1992. She is also Turkey's first race winning female driver. She is also her country's first international race driver. She secured the championship title in the DSG class of the 2024 TCR European Endurance, becoming the first woman to do so.

== Personal life ==
Seda Kaçan was born in Kırklareli, Turkey in 1993. Her father is a military officer and her mother is a school teacher. She completed her higher education at Yıldız Technical University in Istanbul as an industrial engineer. She works as a brand manager in the multinational company Doritos and PepsiCo.

== Sport career ==
At the beginning of her racing career, Kaçan was held back by people around her, as they told her that it is a men's sport. After training, she decided to start her motorsport career at the age of 27, a relatively late age.

Kaçan raced first at the Turkey Karting Championship for one season, before she debuted as the second Turkish female driver in 30 years at the 2022 Turkish Racetrack Championship's (Turkish: Türkiye Pist Şampiyonası) first leg, organized by the Turkish Motorsports Federation (TOSFED) and held at Ülkü Park in İzmir on 18–19 June. The country's first female racing driver was Ann Tahincioğlu, who competed in 1992 at the Turkish Championship. Competing in an Audi TT with race number 5 for the Bitci Racing Team AMS, and sponsored by her employer Kaçan finished the first round's first leg in sixth place, and reached fifth place in the second leg. In the second round of the championship at the İzmit Körfez Circuit, she took third place.

Kaçan remembers her first race as "it was very exciting to start in the pole position, because the championship applies a 'reverse grid order', at which the slowest driver starts in the front". Furthermore, "she felt like she was chased by monsters behind her. So, she focused more on the learning part of the job rather than the race winning".

=== 2023 ===
Kaçan stood twice on the podium at the 2023 Turkish Championship. In 2023, she won the championship's first round's first leg at İzmit Körfez Circuit in her new race car Audi RS 3 DSG. She became Turkey's first race-winning female driver. The 2023 Championship consisted of five rounds each with two legs. A total of twelve cars took part in two categories, in "Super" and "Maxi" groups.

Kaçan claimed her first victory in the 2023 Turkish Racetrack Championship, and finished the national championship in the second place.

Kaçan then became the first Turkish female driver in international circuit competitions debuting in the final round of 2023 TCR Italy Touring Car Championship in Autodromo Internazionale Enzo e Dino Ferrari, Imola.

=== 2024 ===
In 2024, the TCR European Endurance series were established, a four-leg touring car race series in three classes, Overall, DSG and Gen1, consisting of two stages lasting one hour each with a pit stop inbetween, piloted by two different race drivers in each stage. She joined Texaco Team AMS, and raced in her first full-time international season on an Audi RS3 DSG with teammate İbrahim Okyay. Sponsored by Doritos, Pepsi and Sixt, she was the only female race driver in the championship.

In the first leg of the championship in Balaton Park Circuit, Hungary, Kaçan was twice on the podium, coming first in the DSG category and second in the Overall. She repeated her first place victory in the second leg in Autodromo Vallelunga Piero Taruffi. With her success in the third leg in Misano World Circuit Marco Simoncelli, also in Italy, she secured the championship title in the TCR European Endurance with her teammate İbrahim Okyay in the DSG category with one race left before the end of the 2024 season.
