= Amorett Konfektionsfabrik =

Former clothing manufacturing company in Oslo, Norway

Amorett Konfektionsfabrik was a clothing manufacturing company in Oslo, Norway.

It was established by E. Storm Røslie in 1927. The factory weft its own textiles and produced women's underwear, night gowns, pyjamas and similar clothing. The production facility was at Gustav Vigelands vei 1 at Skøyen, and was torn down in the 1960s.
