= Hans E. Kinck =

Norwegian author and philologist

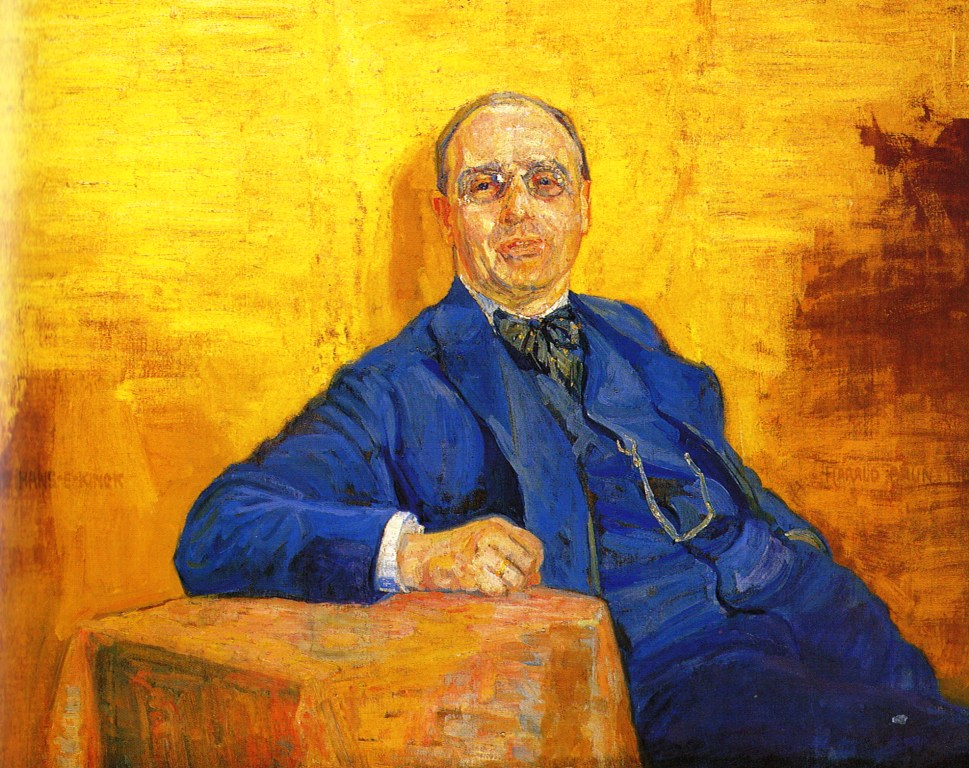
- Hans E. Kinck, painting from 1912 by Harald Brun

Hans Ernst Kinck (Norwegian pronunciation: [ˈçɪŋk]; 11 October 1865 – 13 October 1926) was a Norwegian author and philologist who wrote novels, short stories, dramas, and essays. He was nominated for the Nobel Prize in Literature seven times.

== Life ==
Kinck was born in Øksfjord in Loppa Municipality in Finnmark county, Norway. His father, Theodor Kinck (1832–1903), was a local health inspector and his mother, Hanna Guliante Johannesen (1840–1923), was the daughter of a peasant. He studied philology and the classics at King Frederick's University, Kristiania (now Oslo). He married a fellow writer, Minda Ramm (1859–1924), in 1893. They had at least two sons, Johan Jørgen Kinck (1873–1955) and Tore. Both Tore Kinck and Minde Ramm wrote memoirs about Kinck "full of biographical detail" after his death.

Kinck died in Oslo, two days after his 61st birthday.

== Works ==
Kinck wrote novels, short stories and plays as well as a number of essays on historical and political subjects. He travelled extensively and lived in Italy for long periods. Half of his literary production is related to Italian topics.

He often explores the workings of love and tenderness, and the difference between the mass of humanity and individuals. In his more political works, he warns against fascism, a trend that grows stronger in his later writings. Kinck also wrote about struggling artists, the misunderstandings they met with, and their reactions towards them.

=== Plays ===
Kinck's plays are very lengthy and are often regarded as pieces for reading, not for performing. When played in full, some of his plays last for seven hours or more. They are often closely connected to his essays; expanding on and dramatizing their ideas. His great historical play Mot Karneval (Towards Carnival), based on the life of Niccolò Machiavelli is a prime example; also, a play based on the life of Pietro Aretino called Den Sidste Gjæst/The Last Guest).

His other Italian pieces are based on stories by Boccaccio, and are rooted in medieval tradition, exploring the ways of love and passion.

Kinck also wrote four "Norwegian" plays, with a contemporary setting. They take place in small western valleys, exploring class warfare and the approach of modernity. His greatest play is generally considered to be Driftekaren (The Herdsman, with references to Peer Gynt). It tells of a man who is a "trader and a poet", and how "humanity grows forth" in him, as Kinck puts it. His last play was a sequel to this, written in 1925.

Many of his plays were performed in the theatre created by Ingeborg Refling Hagen, who was willing to stage even the longest marathon performances; some lasting for ten hours.

=== Short stories ===
Kinck wrote many collections of short stories, dealing with both Italy and Norway. Here he told of Norwegian farmers and Norwegian tourists in Italy, sometimes from a comical viewpoint. Many of the shorter pieces are still widely popular.

His first collection of stories, Flaggermusvinger (Batwings), is a typical symbolist work. He explores the connection between man and nature and the conflict between the forces of nature and the forces of the human mind, especially guilt, passion and fear. Some of the stories are reminiscent of Edgar Allan Poe in style. The book is subtitled Tales From the West, as all of them are set in Western Norway.

=== Novels ===
Kinck's novels are mostly placed in a Norwegian setting. They typically involve the approach of modernity and the lack of dialogue between farmers and those in power.

=== Essays ===
Kincks essays are mostly historical. He wrote much on Italian topics, analyzing the renaissance and the approach of fascism. He also wrote about the Mafia. The Norwegian essays analyzed the split between the saga and the medieval ballad, focusing on the changes in the mood and styles of storytelling from pagan to Christian times in Norway.

== Music and film ==
Four composers have written music to works by Kinck. Eivind Groven wrote a number of songs based on texts from Kinck's plays. His first symphony was inspired by the play Driftekaren. Wolfgang Plagge and Ludvig Irgens-Jensen have also composed music based on themes from his novels.

Randall Meyers scored the movie Flaggermusvinger (Batwings, 1992), which is based on three of Kinck's short stories. Kinck was credited as the writer of the 1981 TV play Når eplene modnes.

== Selected works ==
- 1892: Huldren (novel)
- 1893: Ungt Folk (novel; A Young People, translated by Barent Ten Eyck, New York, E. P. Dutton (1929)
- 1895: Flaggermus-vinger (short stories)
- 1897: Fra Hav til Hei (short stories)
- 1897: Den nye kapellanen (novel)
- 1904: Italienere (essays)
- 1918–19: Sneskavlen Brast (The Avalanche Broke, 3 volumes, novel on the peasants v. the rural and urban upper classes)
