= Fredrik Gottlieb Olsen Ramm =

Norwegian physician

- Born: October 31, 1855; Sogndal Municipality, Norway
- Died: November 8, 1932 (aged 77); Oslo, Norway
- Education: Royal Frederick University
- Occupation: Physician
- Known for: Dissertation on prostate hypertrophy (1896)
- Spouse: Anna Margaretha Brinchmann (m. 1890)
- Children: Fredrik Ramm

Fredrik Gottlieb Olsen Ramm (31 October 1855 – 8 November 1932) was a Norwegian physician.

== Personal life ==
He was born in Sogndal Municipality as a son of vicar Jens Ludvig Carl Olsen (1816–1866) and Vally Marie Caroline Juell (1832–1906). In 1890 he married Anna Margaretha Brinchmann, daughter of the customs treasurer in Moss. Their son Fredrik Ramm was a well-known journalist. His younger brother Harald Ramm was a noted barrister.

His wife Vally was a daughter of Sogndal's mayor Fredrik Christian Juell and sister-in-law of Carl August Gulbranson. As such, Fredrik Gottlieb Olsen Ramm was an uncle of Carl Gulbranson.

== Career ==
He finished his secondary education in 1873, finished officer's training in 1876 and graduated with the cand.med. degree from the Royal Frederick University in 1881. He started working as a physician for fishermen in Lofoten in the same year. He also conducted study travels in Germany and Austria in 1883. After six years as a physician in the United States from 1884 to 1890, he returned to Norway and Stavanger before being hired as a reserve physician at Rikshospitalet in 1891. He worked in Tromsøe from 1894, then as chief physician at Aker Hospital from 1897 to 1912.

He was known for his dissertation Kastration ved Prostatahypertrofi ("Castration by Prostate Hypertrophia") from 1896, and published prolifically in medical journals. He died in November 1932 in Oslo.
