= Minda Ramm =

Norwegian writer (1859–1924)

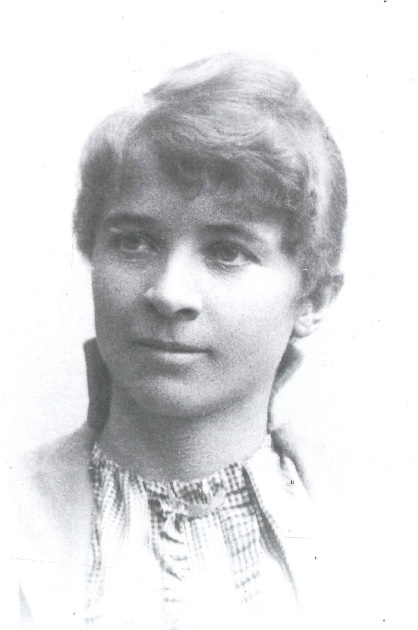
- Born: Minda Mathea Olava Ramm; 27 December 1859; Sogndal, Norway
- Died: 11 April 1924 (aged 64)
- Occupation: writer
- Spouse: Hans E. Kinck (m. 1893)

Minda Mathea Olava Ramm (27 December 1859 – 11 April 1924) was a Norwegian novelist, translator and literary critic.

== Early life ==
Ramm was born in Sogndal Municipality, to Vally Marie Caroline Juell and parish priest Jens Ludvig Carl Olsen. While being a student in Kristiania, she was a founding member of the women's discussion society Skuld, a forerunner to the Norwegian Association for Women's Rights. Ramm served as the society's first secretary, while the other five co-founders were Cecilie Thoresen, Anna Bugge, Laura Rømcke, Marie Holst, and Betzy Børresen (later Kjelsberg). Ramm graduated as cand.real. in 1890. In 1893 she married writer Hans E. Kinck. Shortly after their marriage, the couple travelled to Paris, where they stayed for about one year. They had at least two sons, Johan Jørgen Kinck (1873–1955) and Tore Kinck.

== Literary career ==
Ramm made her literary debut in 1896, with the novel Lommen ("The Pocket"), where a female student tells her story. Later books include Overtro. Skildringer fra ottiårene ("Superstition. Narratives from the Eighties") (1898), a psychological study. Further the satirical Valgaar ("Election Year") from 1909, and finally Fotfæste ("Footgrip") from 1918, which has been described as her major work.
