= Philips Fabrikk Norsk =

Philips Fabrikk Norsk was a lightbulb manufacturing company in Oslo, later Arendal, Norway.

It was established in 1936 by Jo Polak, a Dutch immigrant who in 1923 had founded Norsk Philips, the Norwegian branch of Philips. The factory produced incandescent light bulbs for the corporation. The production facility was at Brenneriveien 9, Oslo, near Akerselva until 1948, when it was moved to Arendal. The factory in Arendal closed down in 1983.
