= Toyota Noah =

Minivan model from Toyota

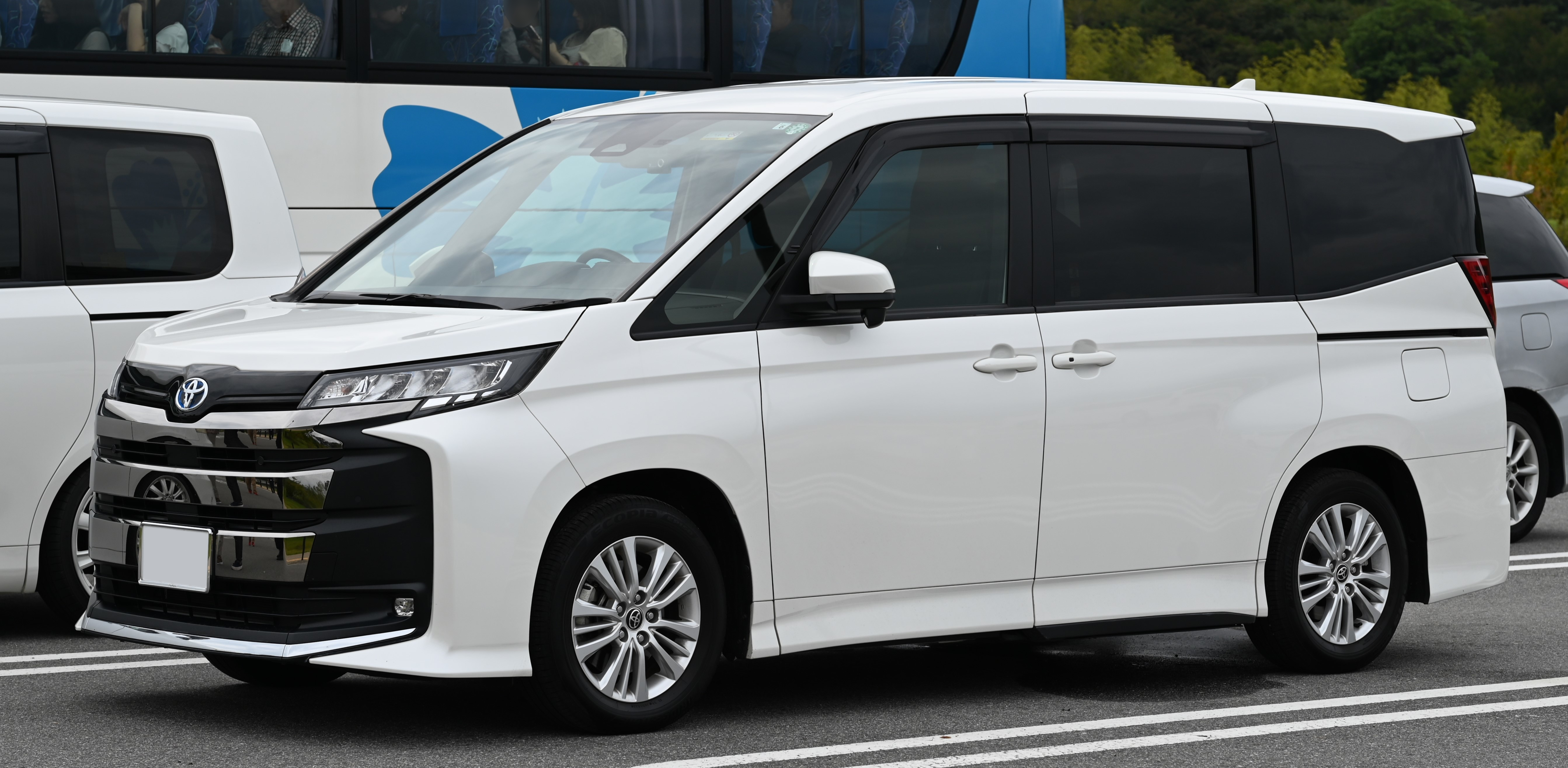
- 2022 Toyota Noah Hybrid S-G

Overview
- Manufacturer: Toyota
- Also called: Toyota Voxy; Toyota Esquire (2014–2021); Toyota NAV1 (Indonesia, 2012–2017); Suzuki Landy (2022–present)
- Production: November 2001 – present

Body and chassis
- Class: Minivan
- Body style: 5-door minivan
- Layout: Front-engine, front-wheel-drive; Front-engine, four-wheel-drive

Chronology
- Predecessor: Toyota TownAce/LiteAce Noah (R40/R50)

The Toyota Noah (Japanese: トヨタ・ノア, Hepburn: Toyota Noa) is a minivan with two rear sliding doors built by Toyota and sold mainly in Asian countries. It is positioned below the Alphard, and above the Sienta. The Noah was also positioned below the Estima until the latter was discontinued in 2019.

Being a front-wheel drive-based vehicle, it replaces the rear-wheel drive-based TownAce/LiteAce Noah, while retaining the "R" model code series and generation numbering. In contrast with its predecessor, the Noah features rear sliding doors on both sides.

The twin version of the Noah is named the Toyota Voxy (Japanese: トヨタ・ヴォクシー, Hepburn: Toyota Vokushī). It is marketed as the sportier version of the Noah, featuring split-type headlights and clear taillight lens, a styling trait that would later be shared with the larger Vellfire. For the third generation, another twin version was also available, named the Toyota Esquire (Japanese: トヨタ・エスクァイア, Hepburn: Toyota Esukwaia). It was marketed as the more luxurious version of the Noah, sported a different grille design and more upmarket interior. Starting with the fourth generation, the Noah is also rebadged and sold by Suzuki as the fourth-generation Suzuki Landy (Japanese: スズキ・ランディ, Hepburn: Suzuki Randi), replacing the previous Landy model, which from 2007 until 2022 had been based on the Nissan Serena.

Up until the third generation, the vehicle was specifically developed to provide variants that complies with the Japanese dimension regulations for compact vehicles with length dimensions under 4,700 mm (185.0 in) and width under 1,700 mm (66.9 in) ("class five" vehicle), which placed it in the lower end of the annual road tax bracket which contributed to its high demand. Since the fourth generation, all variants have exceeded the 1,700 mm (66.9 in) width limit, which made it classified as a "class three" vehicle.

For the first three generations, the Noah is based on the same platform as the Ipsum, with improvements and upgrades throughout its successive generations while retaining most of the rear floor panel. Since the fourth-generation model, the Noah adopted the TNGA platform.

The Noah was once exclusive to Toyota Corolla Store Japanese dealerships, the Voxy to Netz Store, and the Esquire to Toyopet Store. On 1 May 2020, the Noah, Voxy and Esquire became available at all Toyota dealership sales channels in Japan (Toyota Store, Toyopet Store, Corolla Store and Netz). The Esquire was later discontinued in December 2021.

== First generation (R60; 2001) ==
First generation
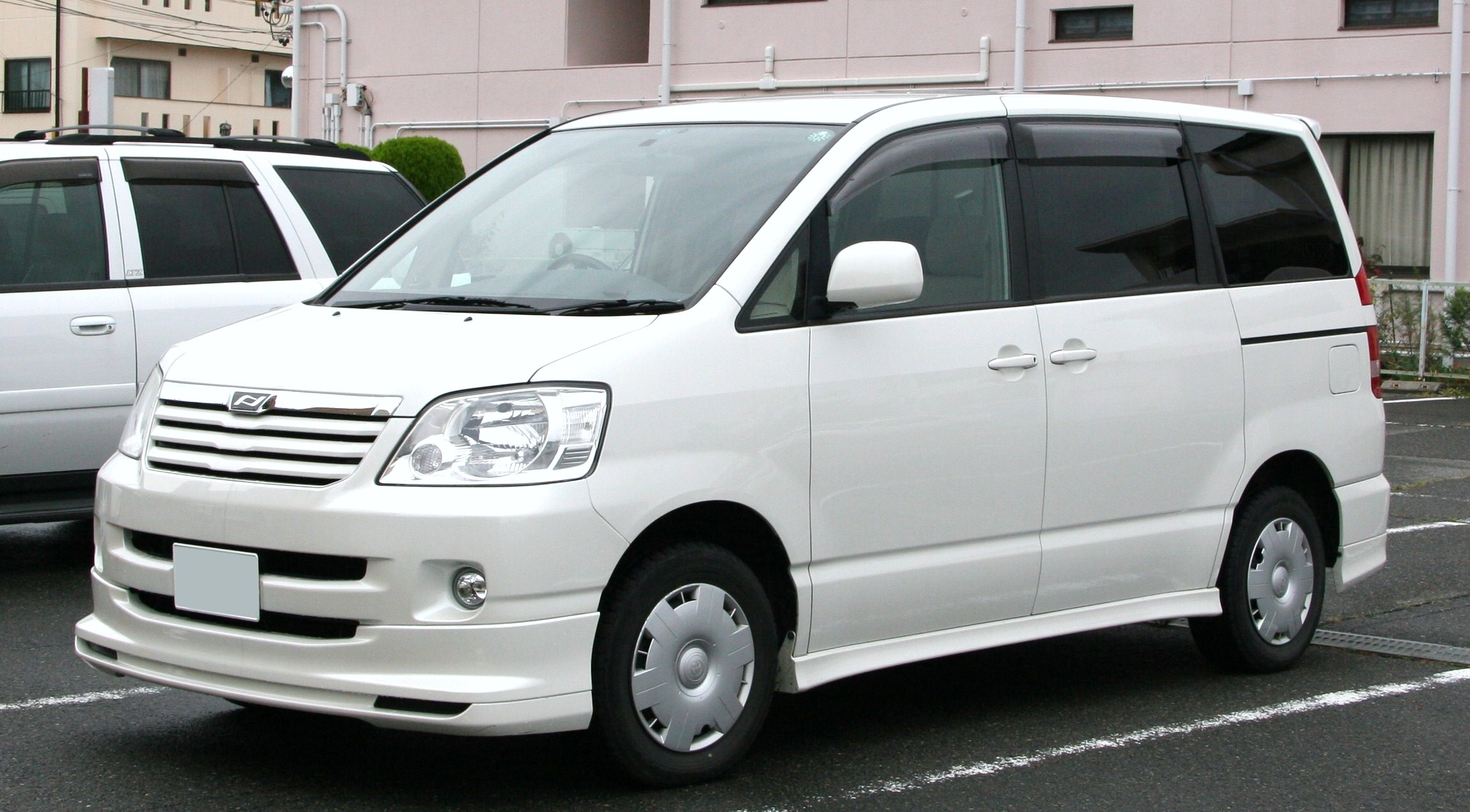
- 2001–2004 Noah X (pre-facelift)

Overview
- Model code: R60
- Also called: Toyota Voxy
- Production: November 2001 – June 2007
- Assembly: Japan: Kariya, Aichi (Toyota Auto Body)

Body and chassis
- Platform: Toyota MC platform
- Related: Toyota Ipsum (XM20)

Powertrain
- Engine: Petrol: 2.0 L 1AZ-FSE direct-injected I4 (AZR60/65)
- Power output: 114 kW (153 hp; 155 PS)
- Transmission: 4-speed automatic (2001–2004); CVT (2004–2007)

Dimensions
- Wheelbase: 2,825 mm (111.2 in)
- Length: 4,580–4,625 mm (180.3–182.1 in)
- Width: 1,695 mm (66.7 in)
- Height: 1,850 mm (72.8 in)
- Kerb weight: 1,500 kg (3,307 lb)

The first-generation Noah and Voxy were released in 16 November 2001. Newly developed based on the Ipsum platform, it is the first time the Noah nameplate adopted a front-wheel drive layout. The model is equipped with the H∞ TEMS suspension. Early Noah model includes: X, S, L, and G Edition were available in X and S grades. While the early Voxy model includes: X, Z, V, and G edition were available in X, and Z grades.

In July 2002, Toyota introduced the Voxy: the Z "Kirameki" features chrome plating on the front grille. At the same time, the Noah added a new grade: the X Navi Special Edition.

The Welcab variant was added in December 2003.

The facelifted model was released in August 2004. Normally a seven-seater, five-seater versions with flexible rear seating called the Noah YY and Voxy Trans-X was added at the same time. The first generation was discontinued in June 2007.

=== Gallery ===
Noah

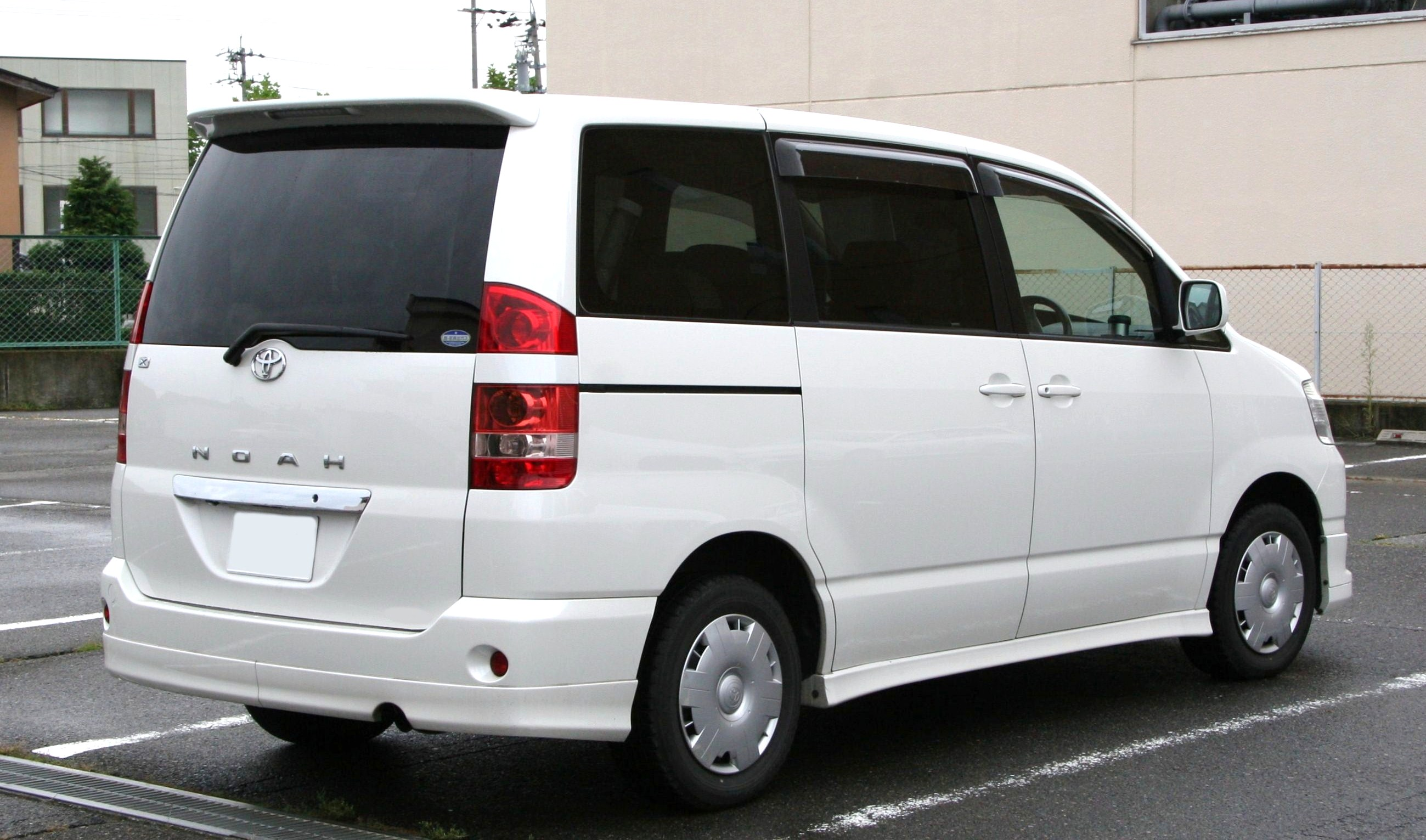
2001–2004 Noah X (pre-facelift)

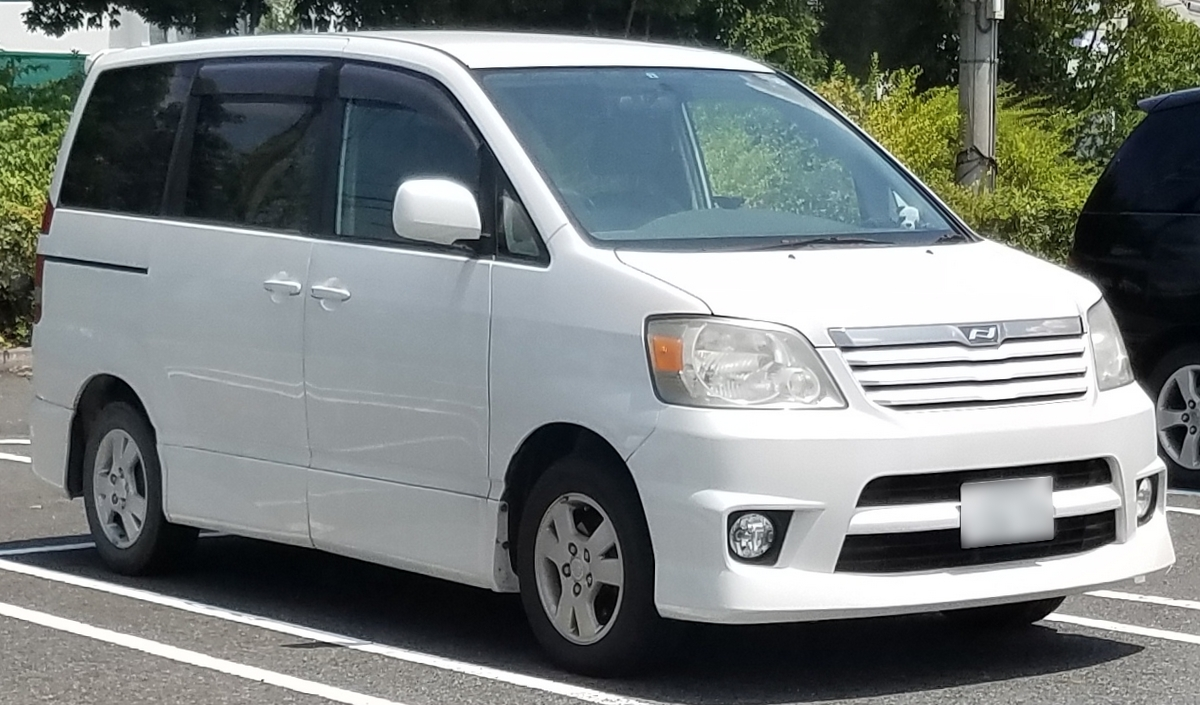
2001–2004 Noah S (pre-facelift)

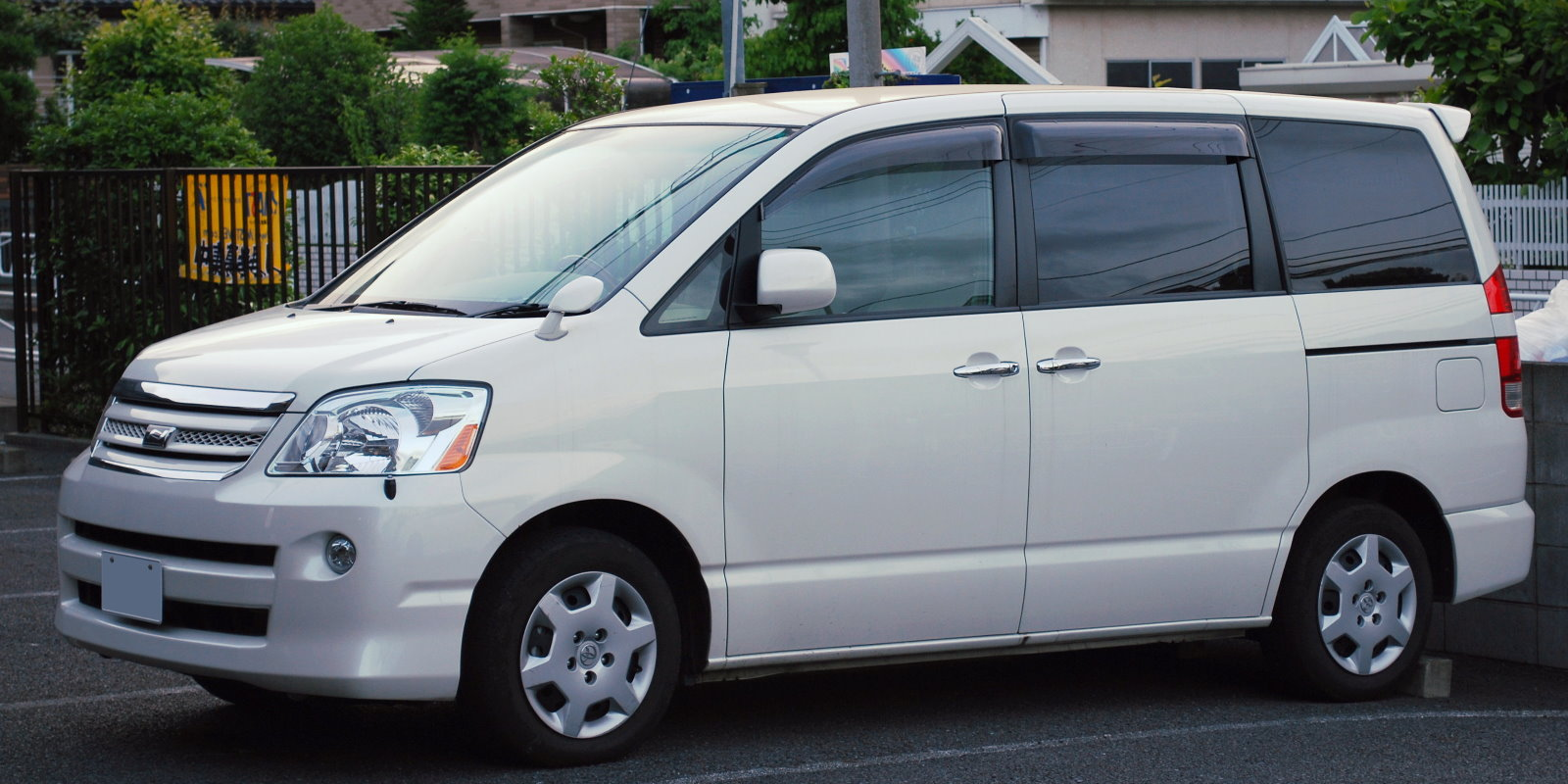
2004–2007 Noah X (facelift)

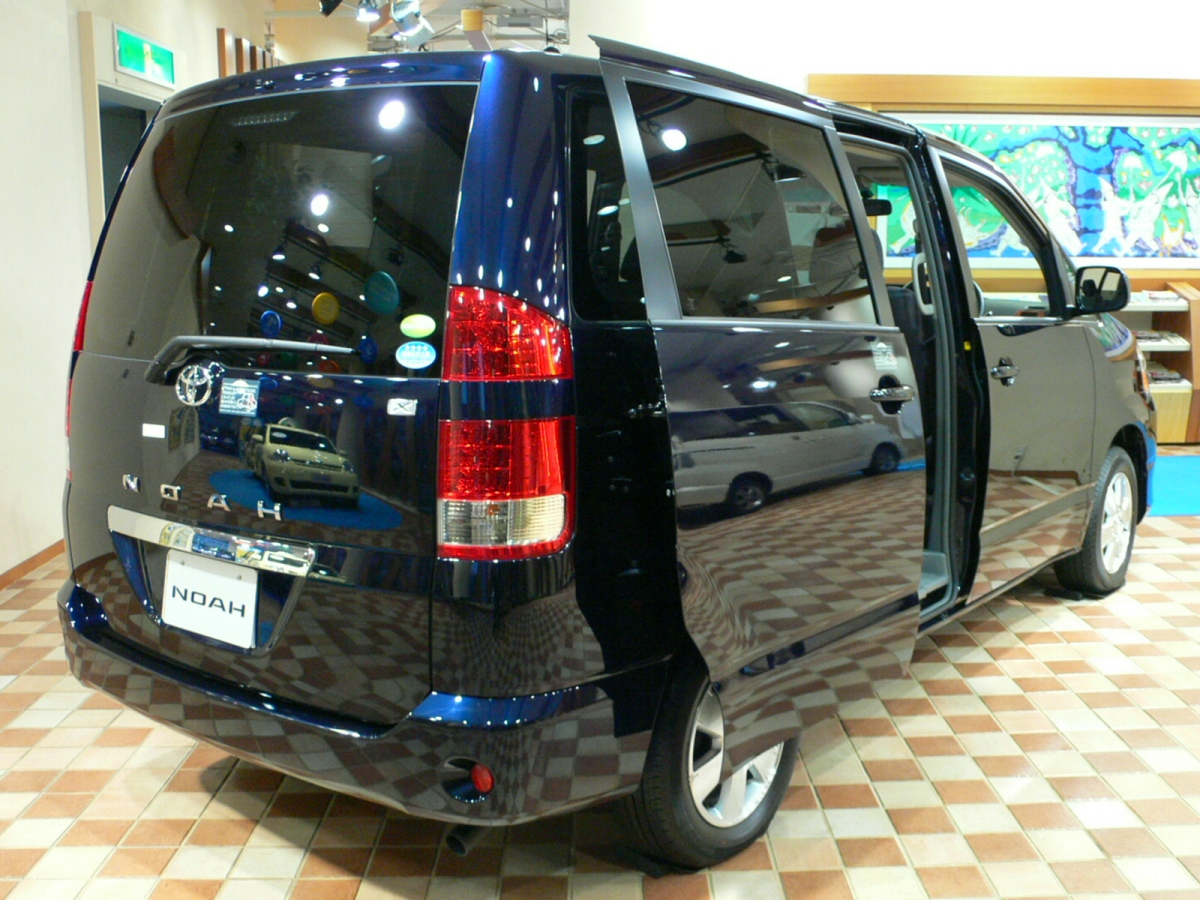
2004–2007 Noah X (facelift)

Voxy

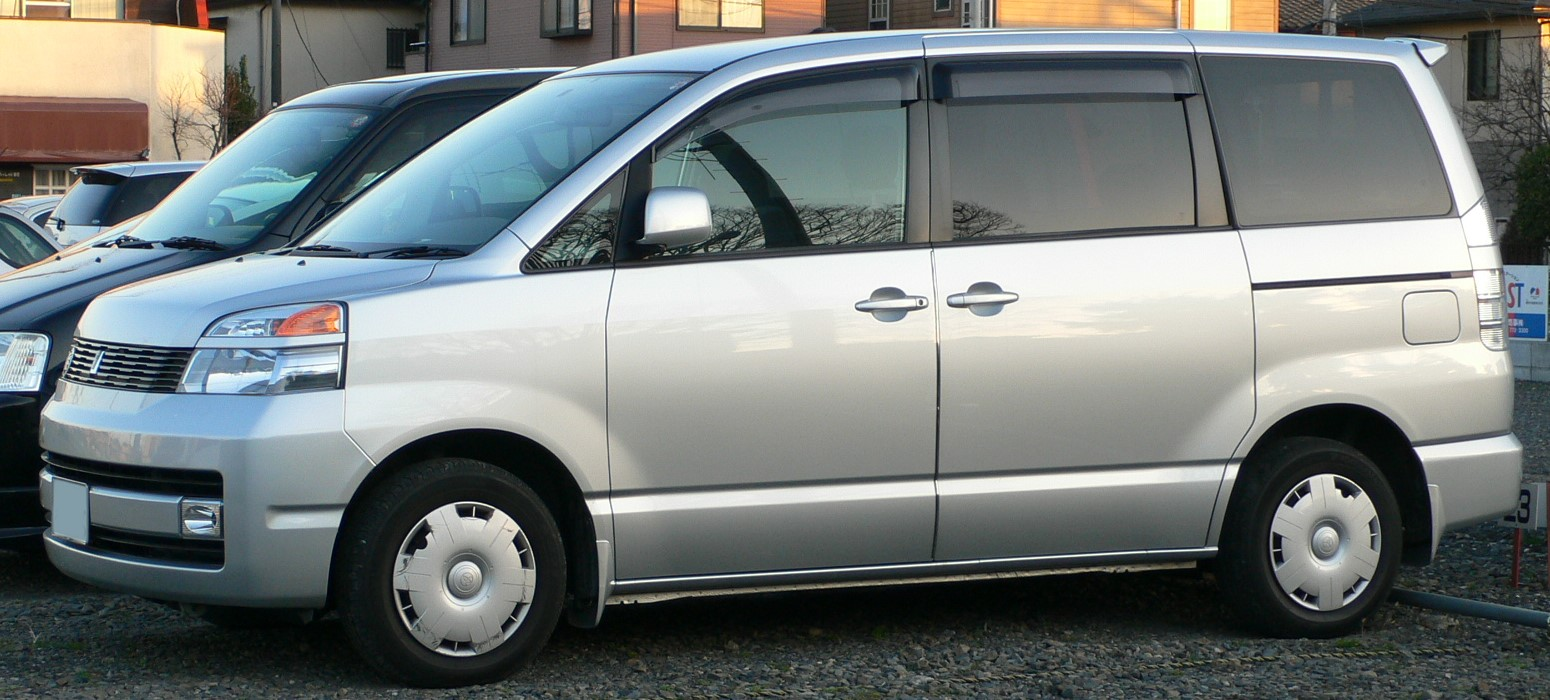
2001–2004 Toyota Voxy X (pre-facelift)

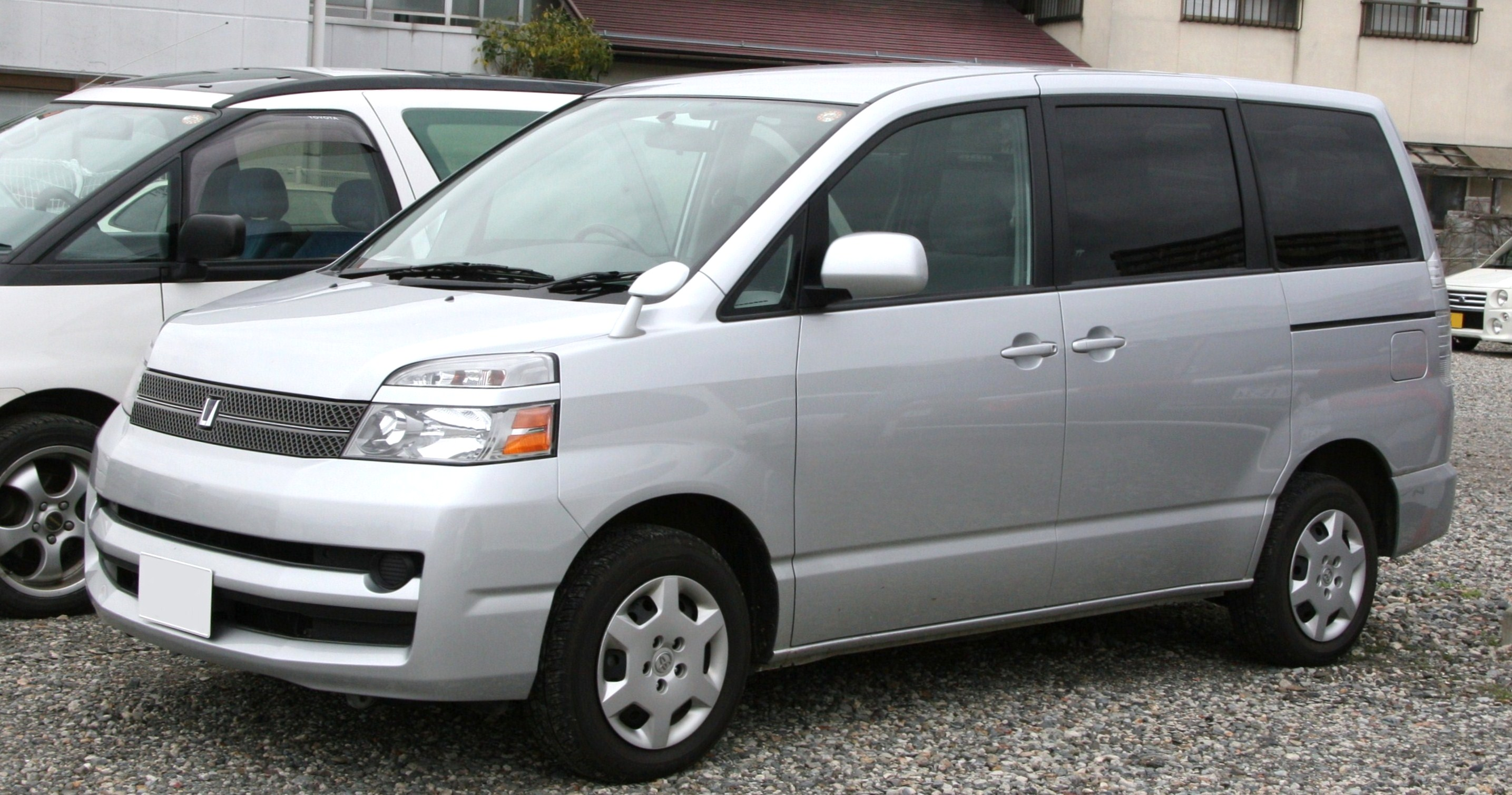
2004–2007 Voxy X (facelift)

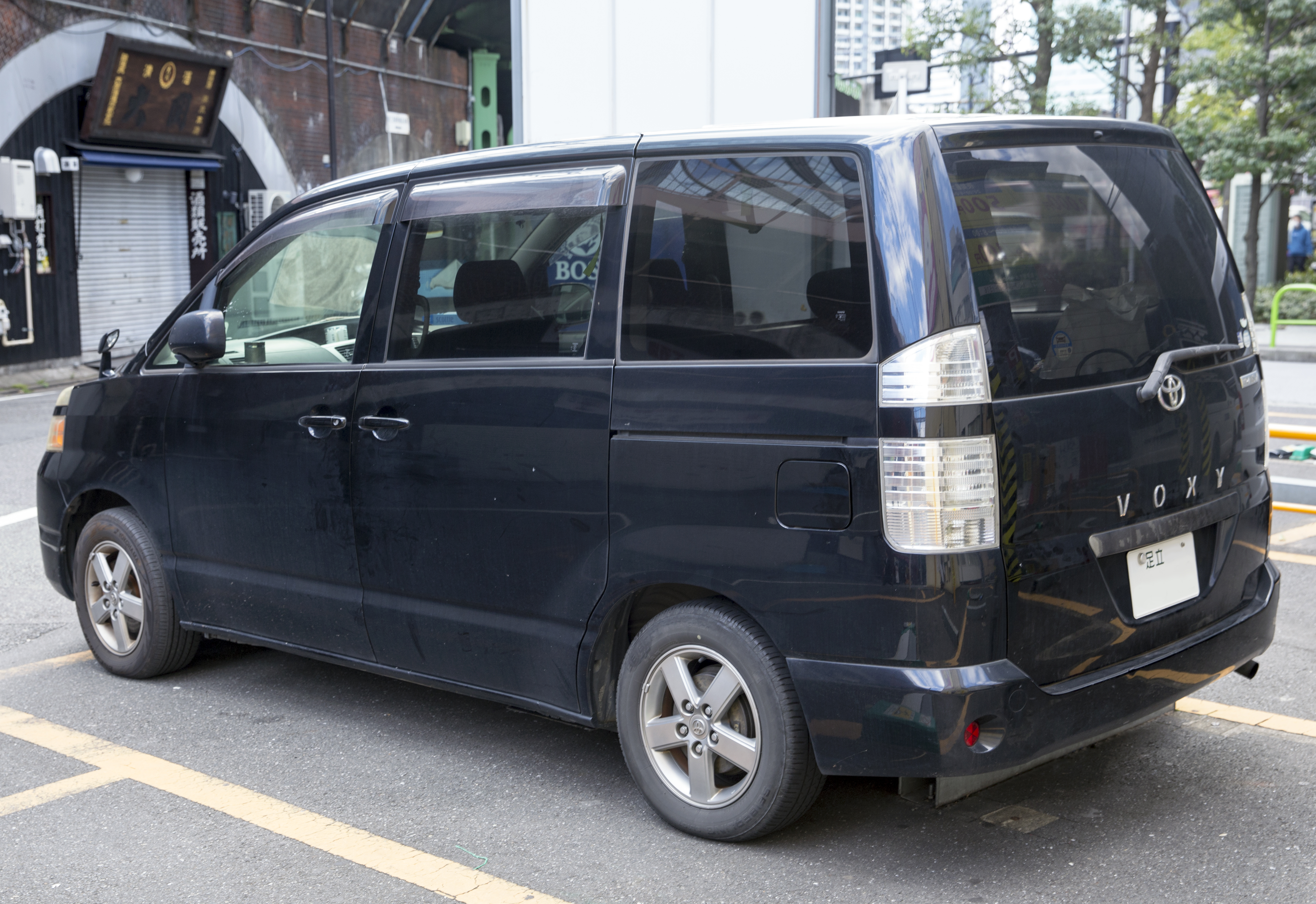
2004–2007 Voxy X (facelift)

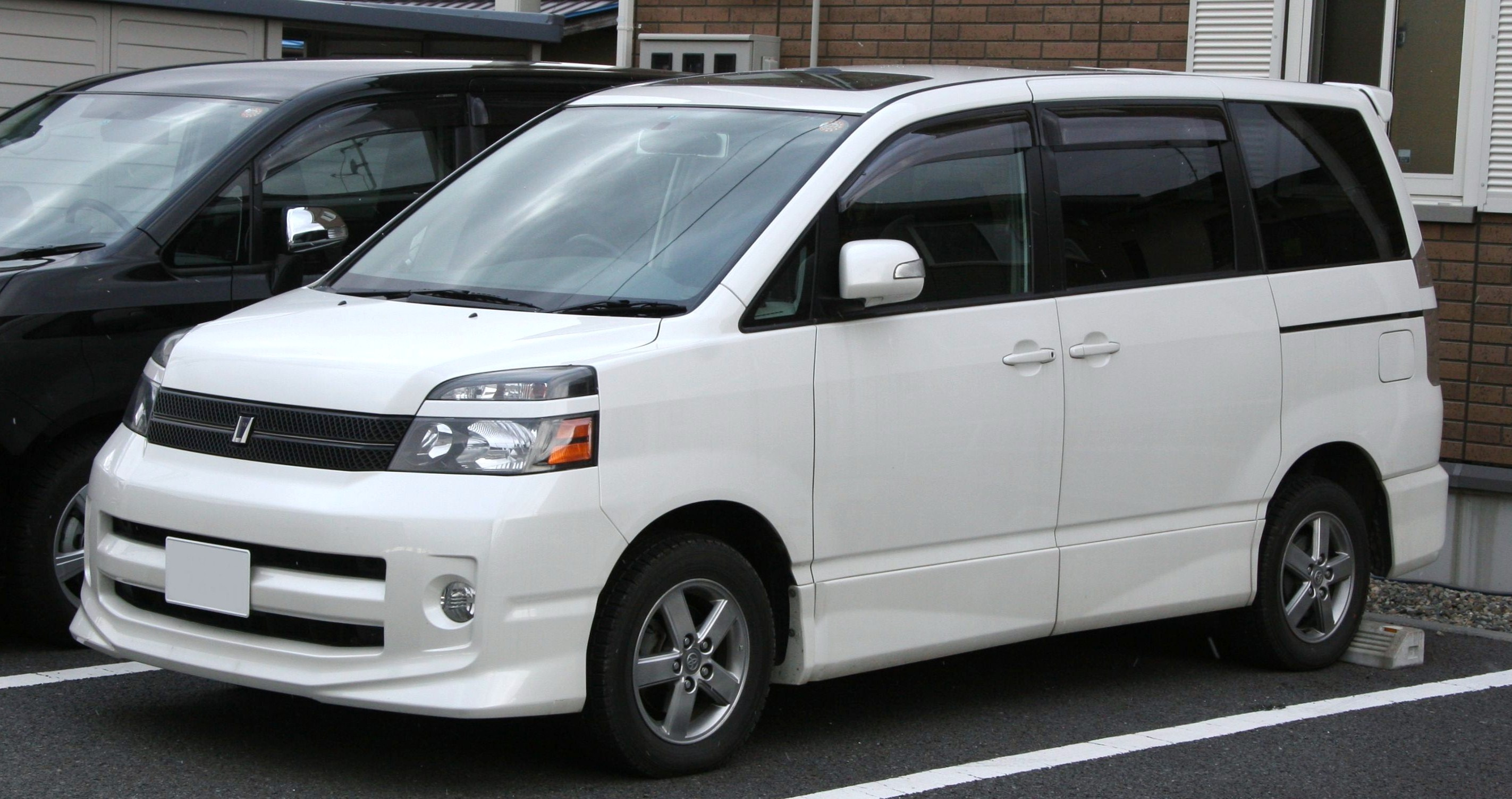
2004–2007 Voxy Z (facelift)

== Second generation (R70; 2007) ==
Second generation
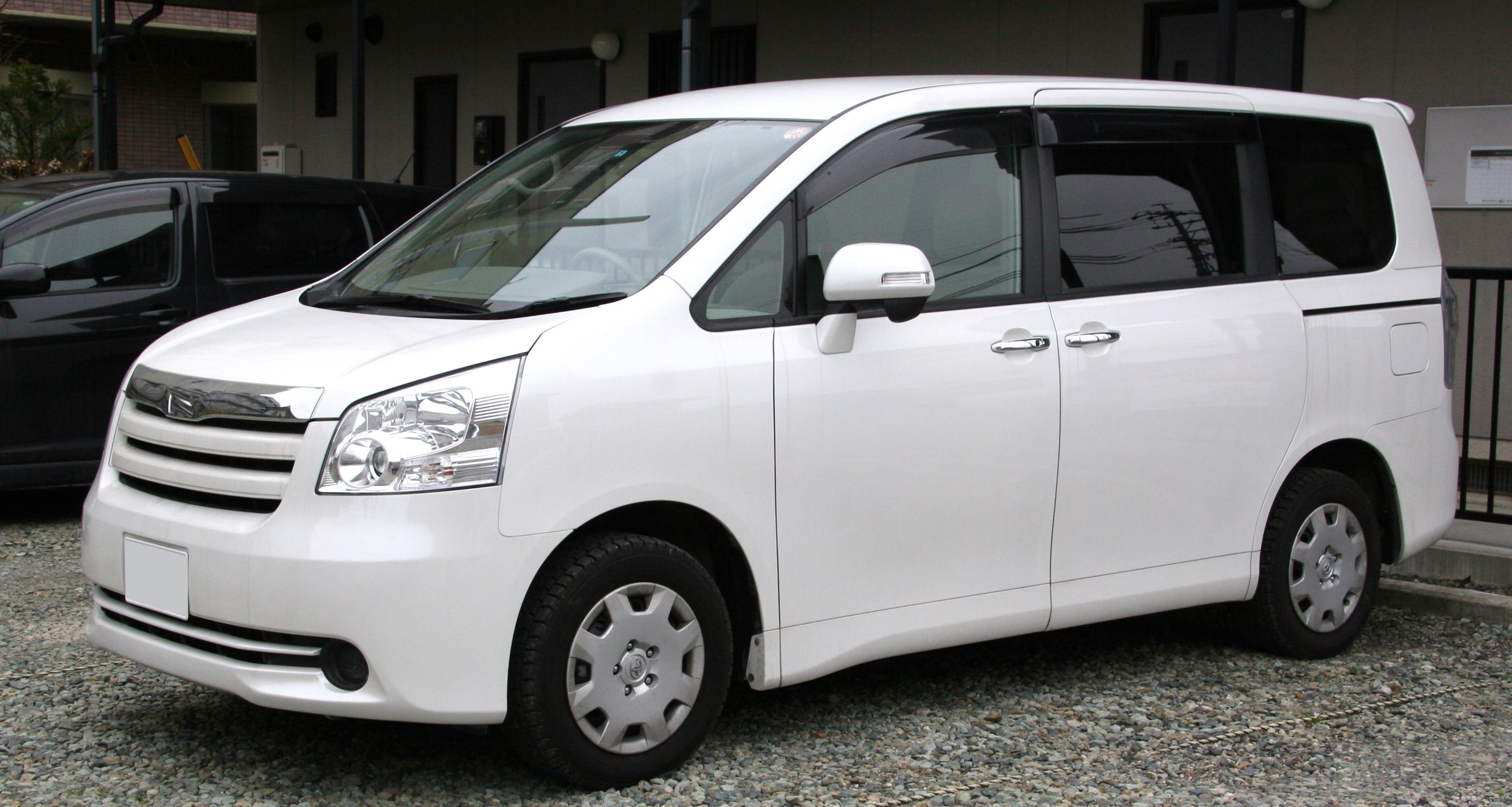
- 2007–2010 Noah X (pre-facelift)

Overview
- Model code: R70
- Also called: Toyota Voxy; Toyota NAV1 (Indonesia, 2012–2017)
- Production: June 2007 – January 2014 (Japan); December 2012 – January 2017 (Indonesia)
- Assembly: Japan: Kariya, Aichi (Toyota Auto Body); Indonesia: Bekasi, West Java (Sugity Creatives, CKD)

Body and chassis
- Platform: Toyota MC platform

Powertrain
- Engine: Petrol: 2.0 L 3ZR-FE I4 (ZRR70/75); 2.0 L 3ZR-FAE Valvematic I4 (ZRR70/75)
- Power output: 103 kW (138 hp; 140 PS) (3ZR-FE); 114 kW (153 hp; 155 PS) (3ZR-FAE)
- Transmission: CVT

Dimensions
- Wheelbase: 2,825 mm (111.2 in)
- Length: 4,595–4,630 mm (180.9–182.3 in)
- Width: 1,695–1,720 mm (66.7–67.7 in)
- Height: 1,850–1,875 mm (72.8–73.8 in)
- Kerb weight: 1,550–1,700 kg (3,417–3,748 lb)

The second-generation Noah and Voxy were released in June 2007. A number of variants were available. The Voxy line started with the X, followed by the sporty Z and ZS, which received a more aggressive looking front bumper, with a larger spoiler and with an additional air intake, as well as alloy wheels. There was also an XL Edition and the top V model, as well as a two-row, five-seater version of the base X called the Trans-X.

The facelifted model was released in April 2010, with redesigned front and rear lamps and bumpers. In June 2010, a car customizing division G Sport released a lowered, sporty version with a customized look for both Noah and Voxy models, called the G Sports (G's). This also had different bumpers and a large, chromed grille. Previously both models are unveiled at the 2010 Tokyo Auto Salon along with introduction of the G Sports nameplate.

The second generation was discontinued in January 2014. For 2007 models on Japanese models only, G-BOOK, a subscription telematics service was available as an option.

=== Indonesia ===
In Indonesia, the facelifted second-generation Noah was launched on 11 December 2012 as the Toyota NAV1, which filled the gap between the Kijang Innova and the Alphard. The NAV1 name is a portmanteau of Navigation One. Production of the NAV1 began in January 2013 with CKD-assembled at Sugity Creatives, a subsidiary of Toyota Auto Body in Bekasi, West Java. It was available in two grade levels, G and V. The engine used is the 2.0-litre 3ZR-FAE four-cylinder petrol unit mated with a continuously variable transmission. In 2014, the V Limited grade was added.

After the NAV1 was discontinued in January 2017 due to declining sales, it was replaced by the facelifted third-generation Voxy in August of the same year, which is imported from Japan. A total of 4,483 NAV1s were sold.

=== Gallery ===
Noah

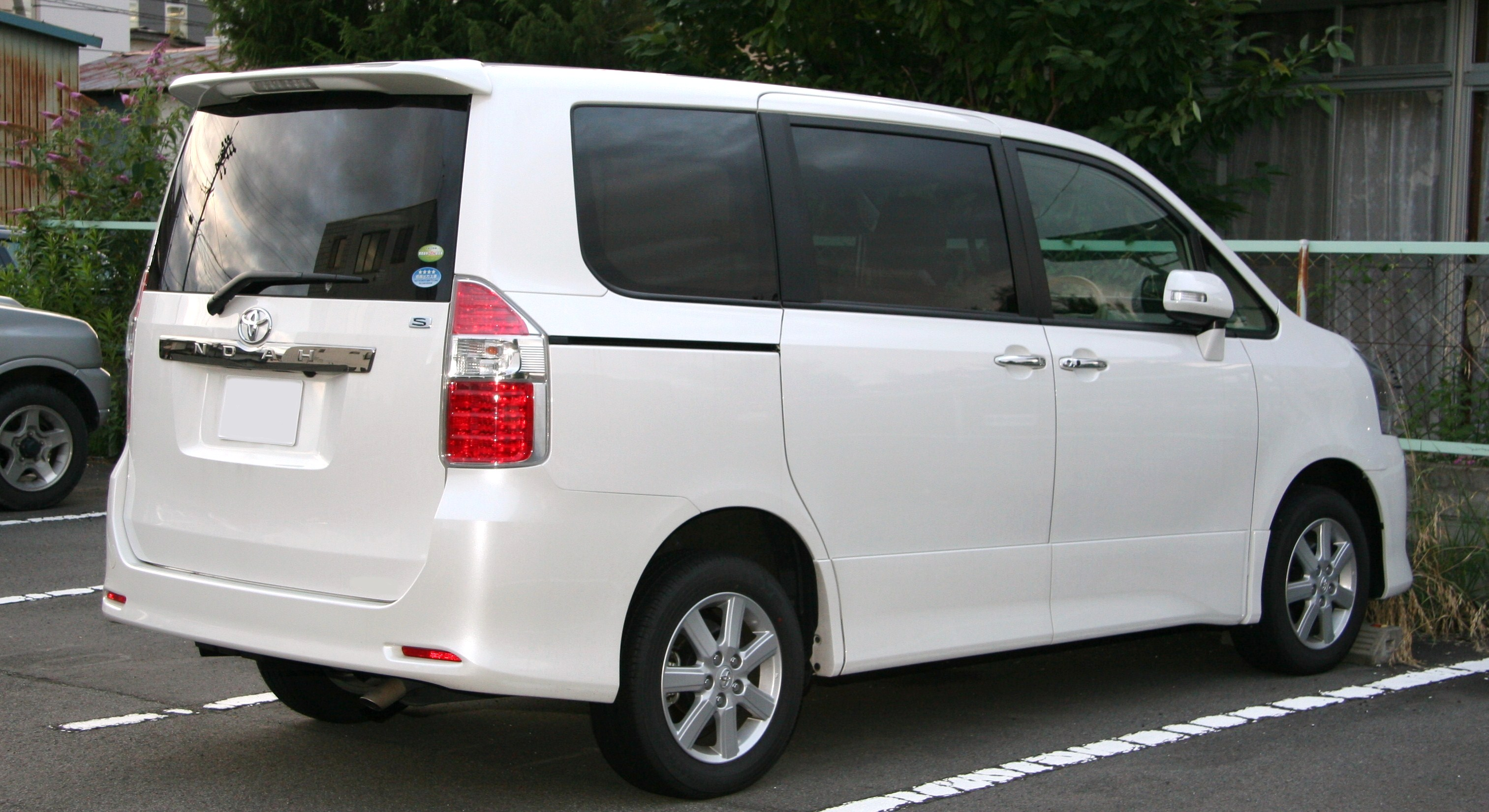
2007–2010 Noah S (pre-facelift)

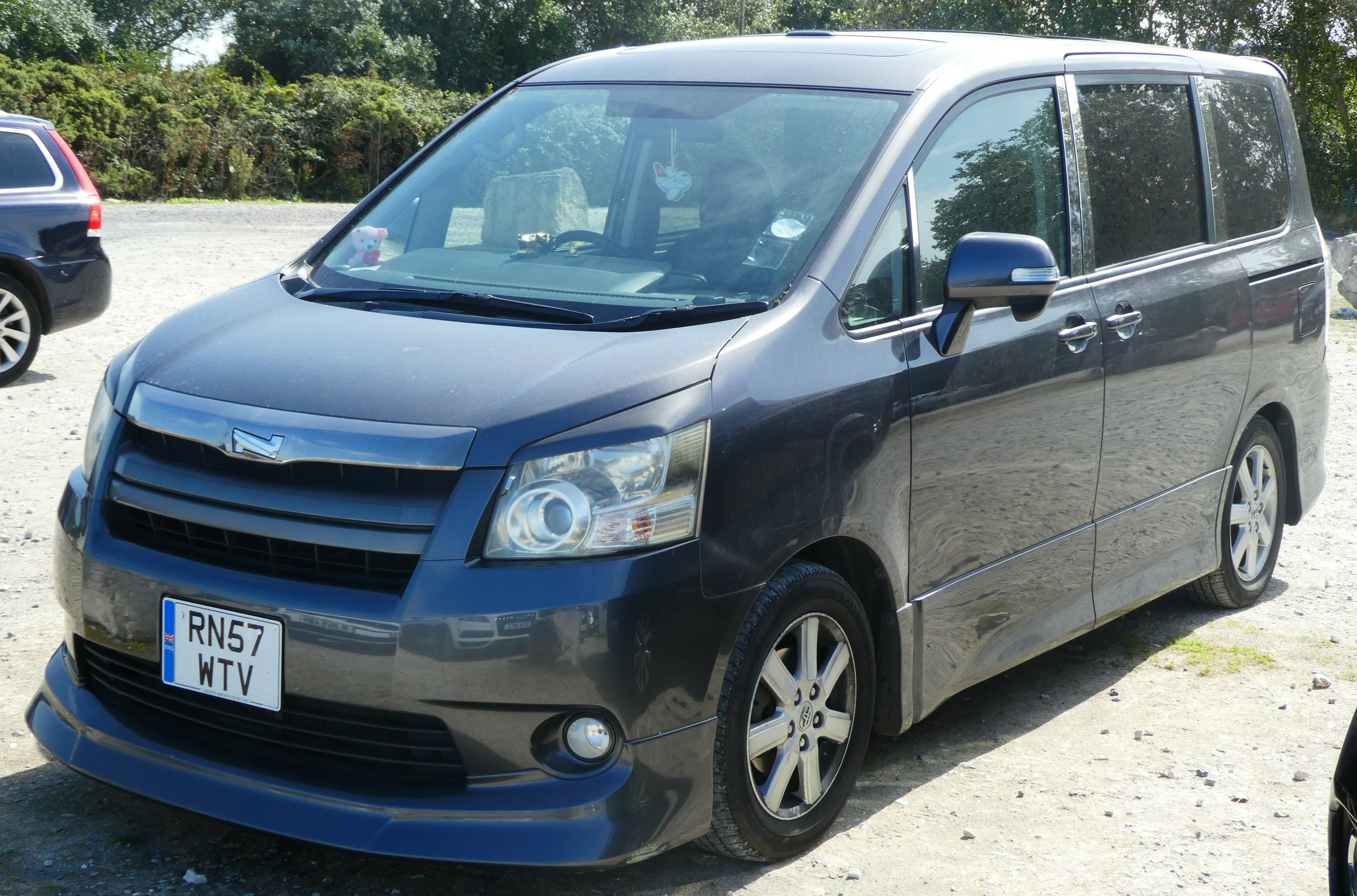
2007–2010 Noah Si (pre-facelift)

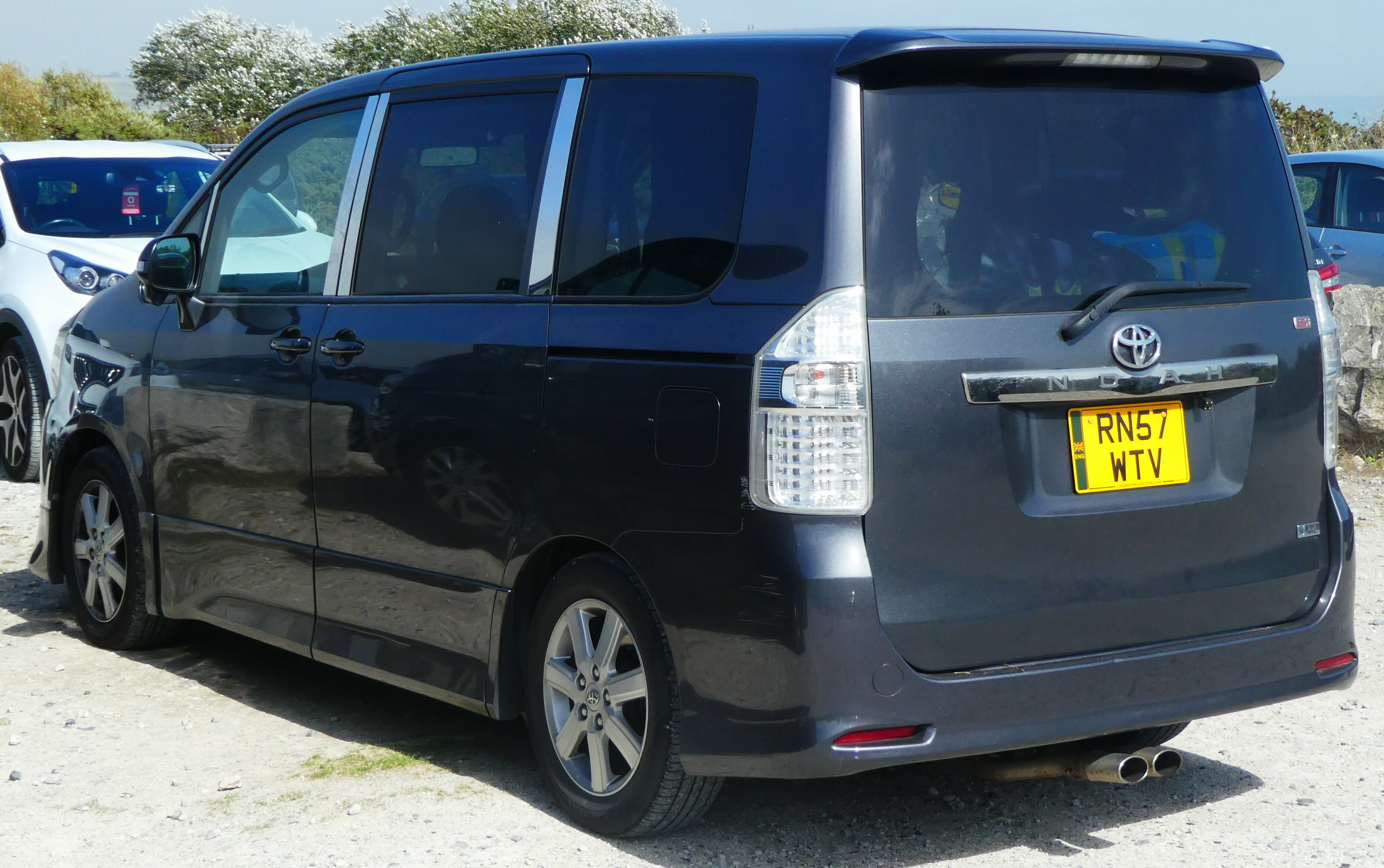
2007–2010 Noah Si (pre-facelift)

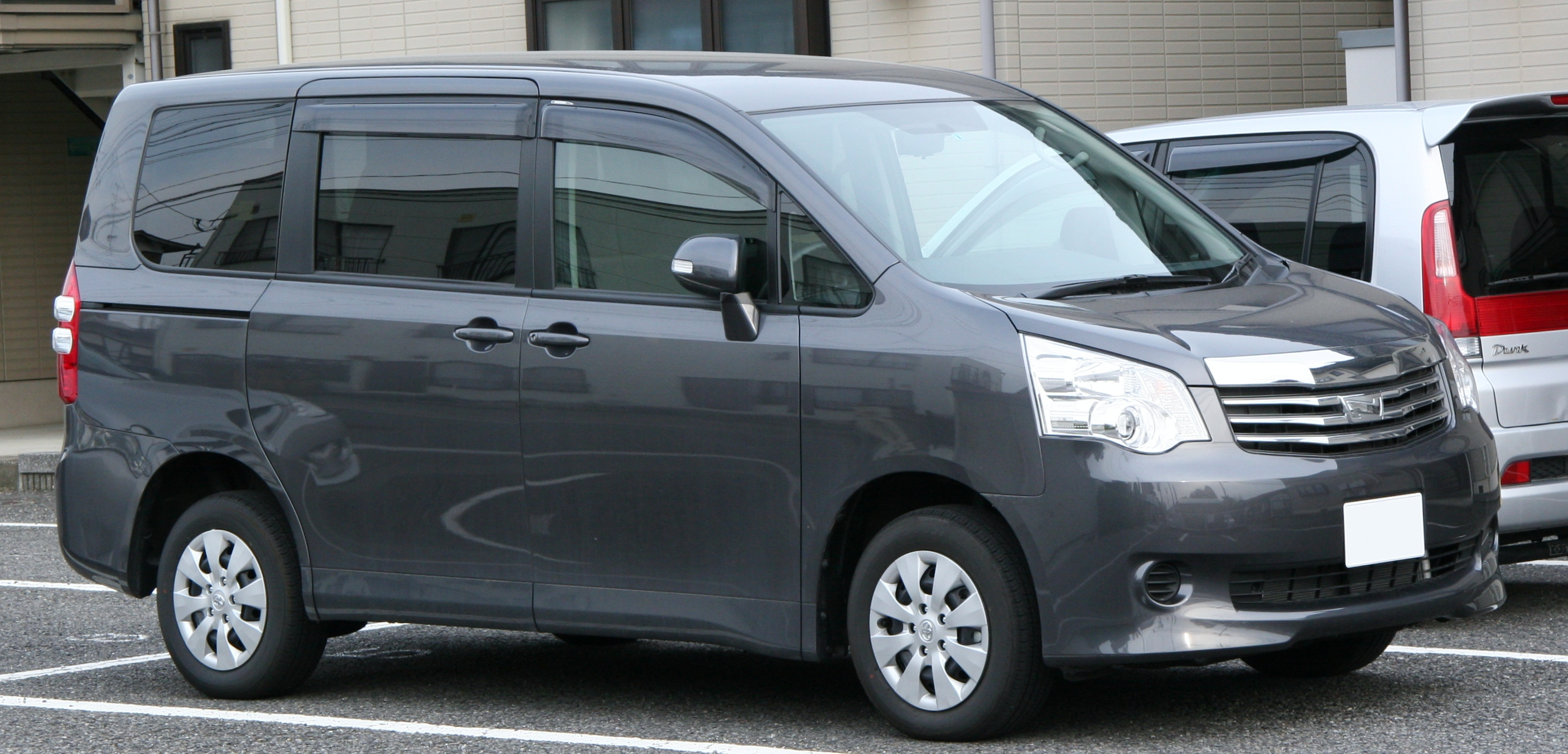
2010–2014 Noah X (facelift)

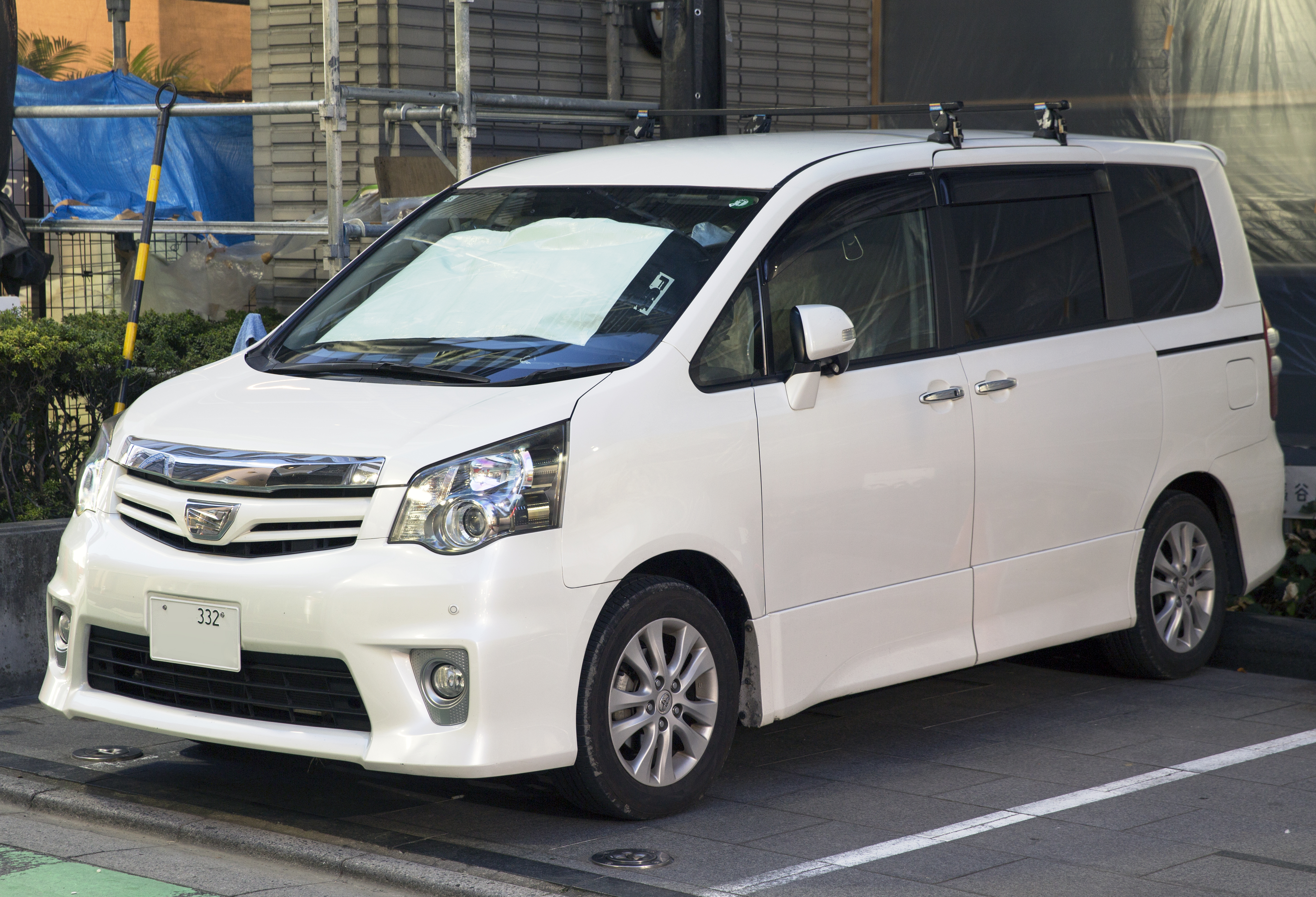
2010–2014 Noah Si (facelift)

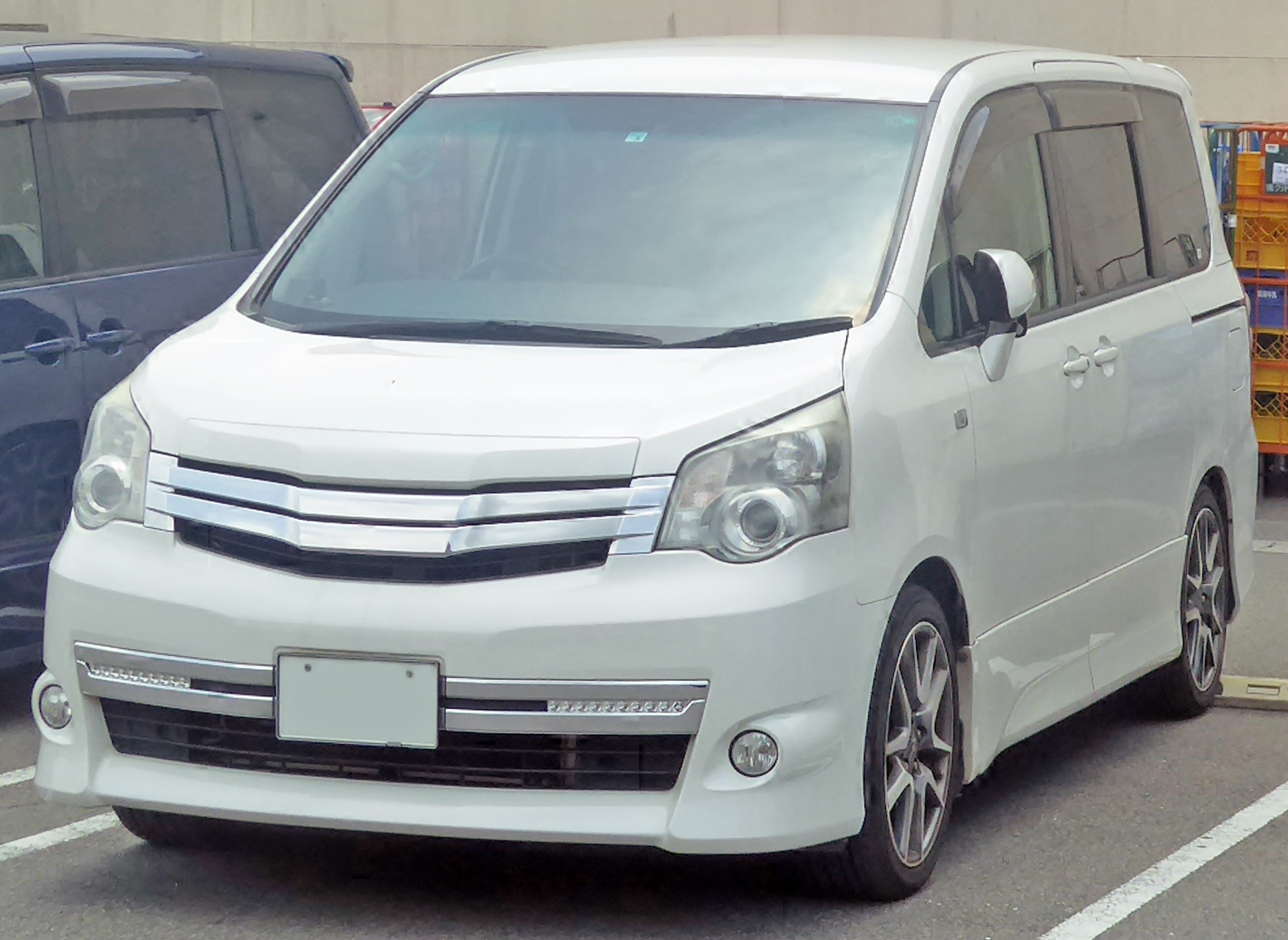
2010–2014 Noah Si G's (facelift)

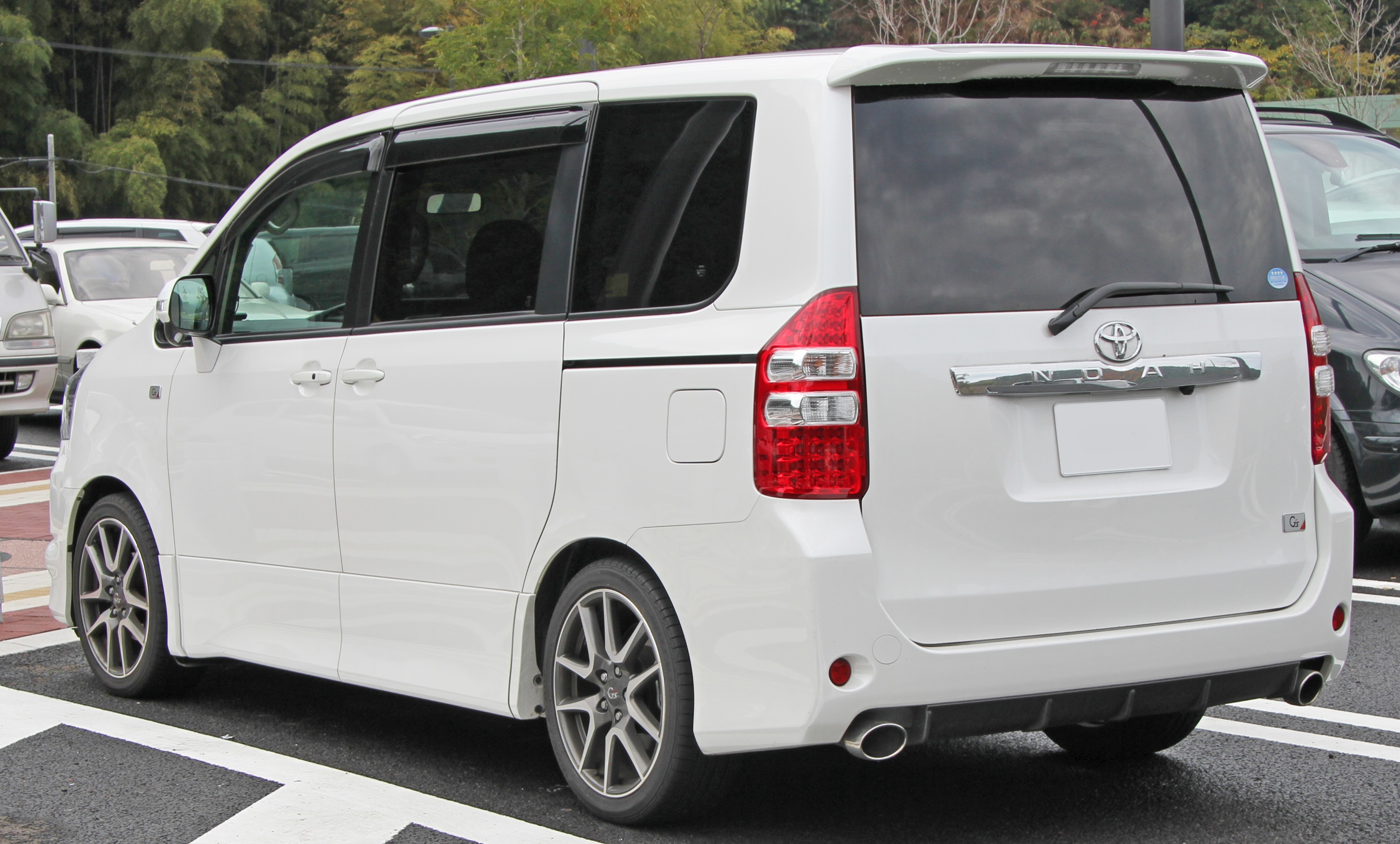
2010–2014 Noah Si G's (facelift)

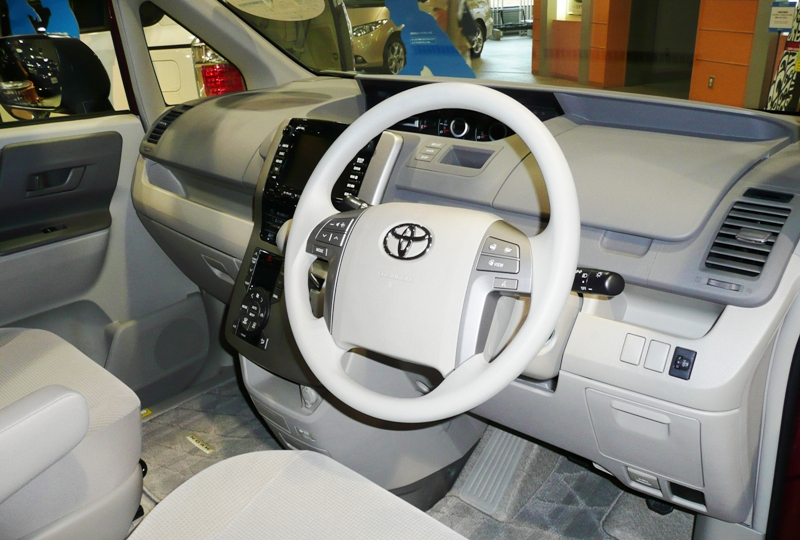
2007 Noah X interior

Voxy

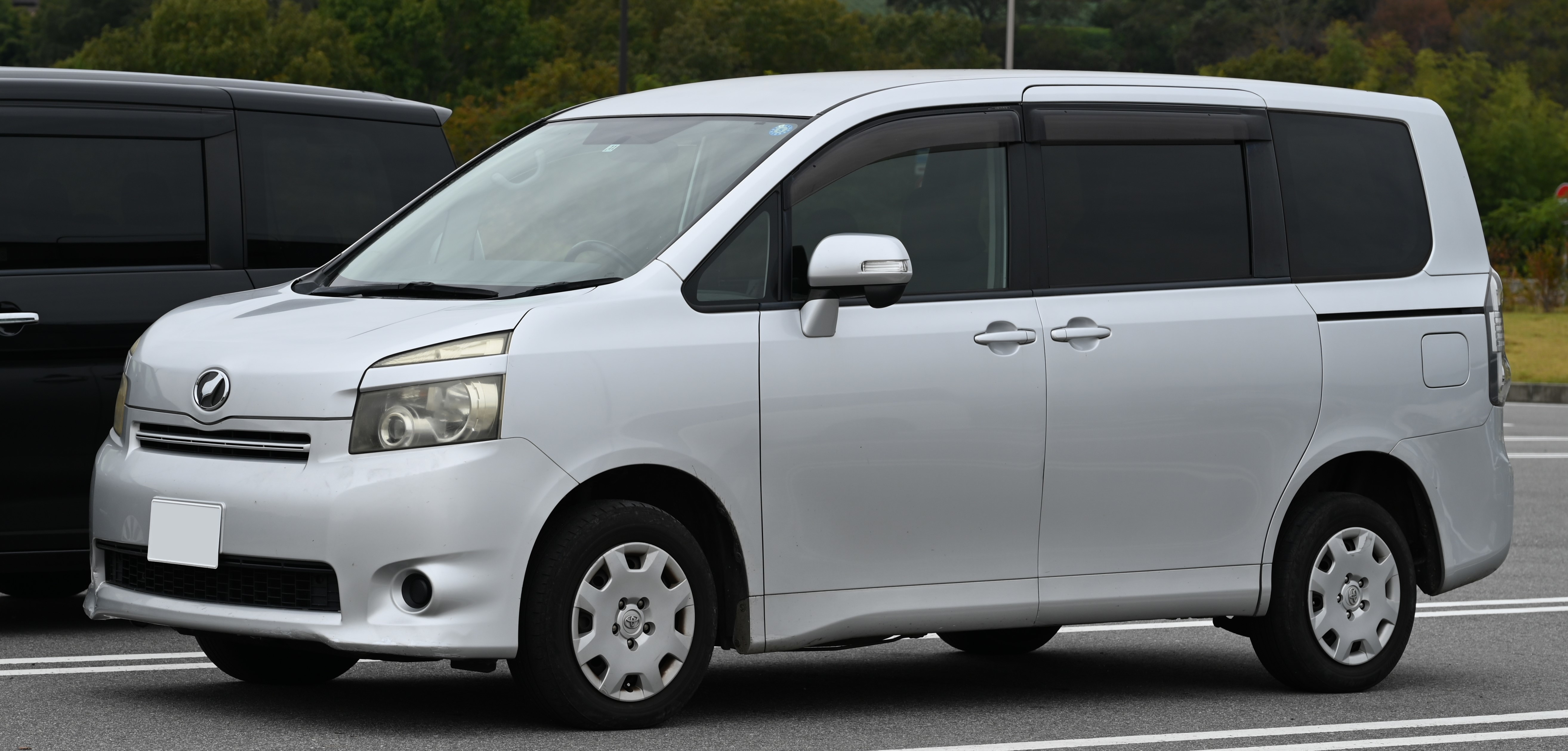
2007–2010 Voxy X (pre-facelift)

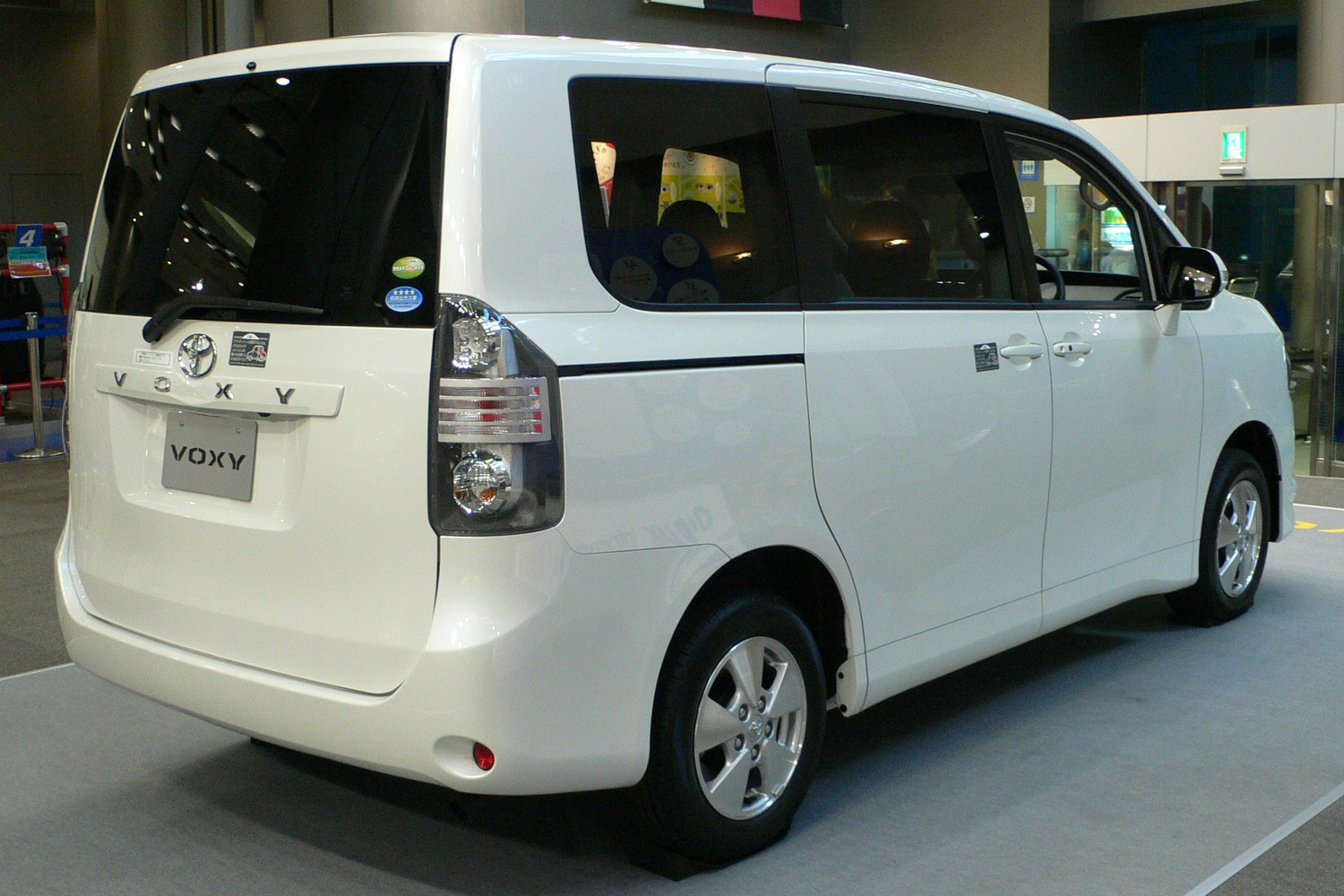
2007–2010 Voxy V (pre-facelift)

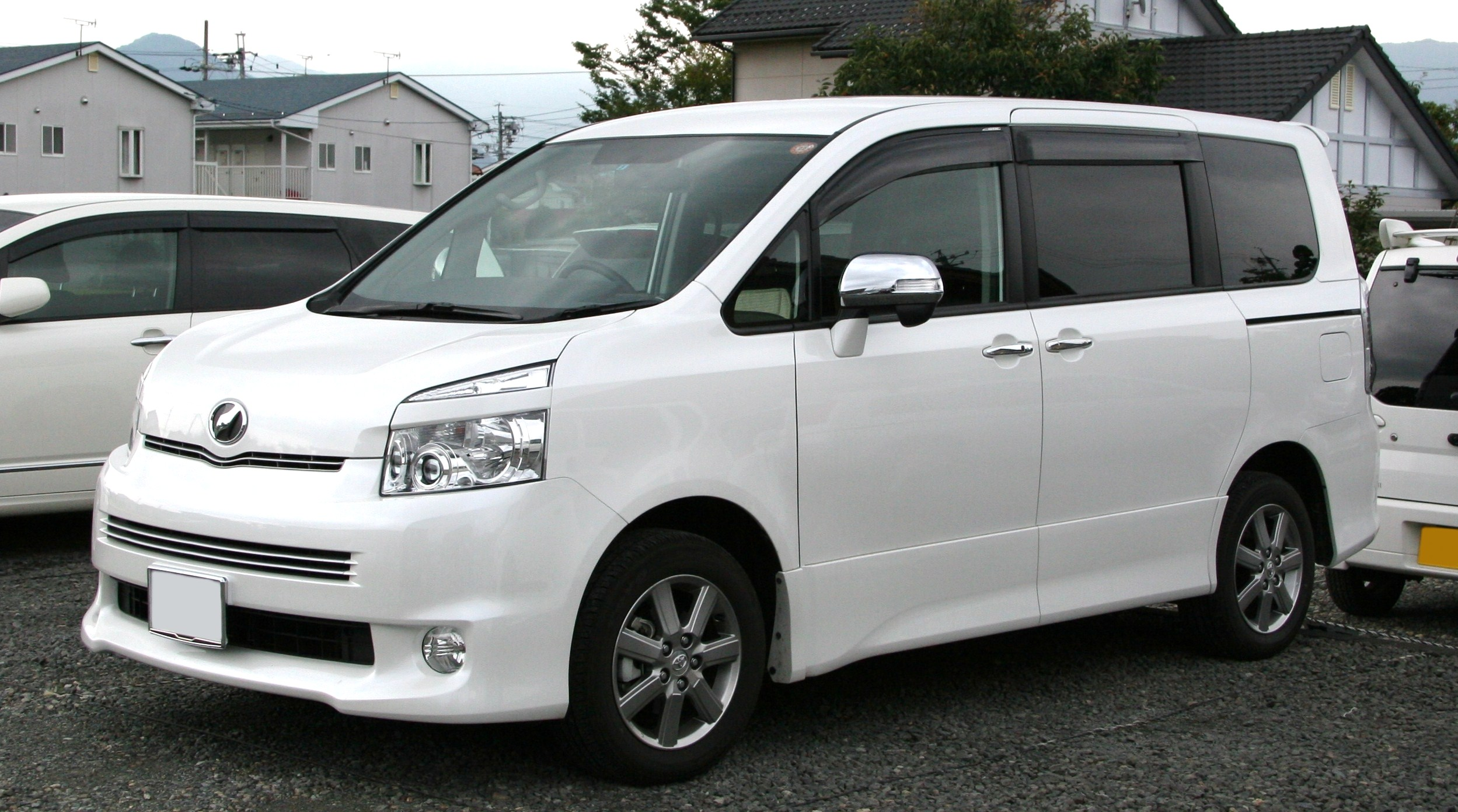
2007–2010 Voxy ZS (pre-facelift)

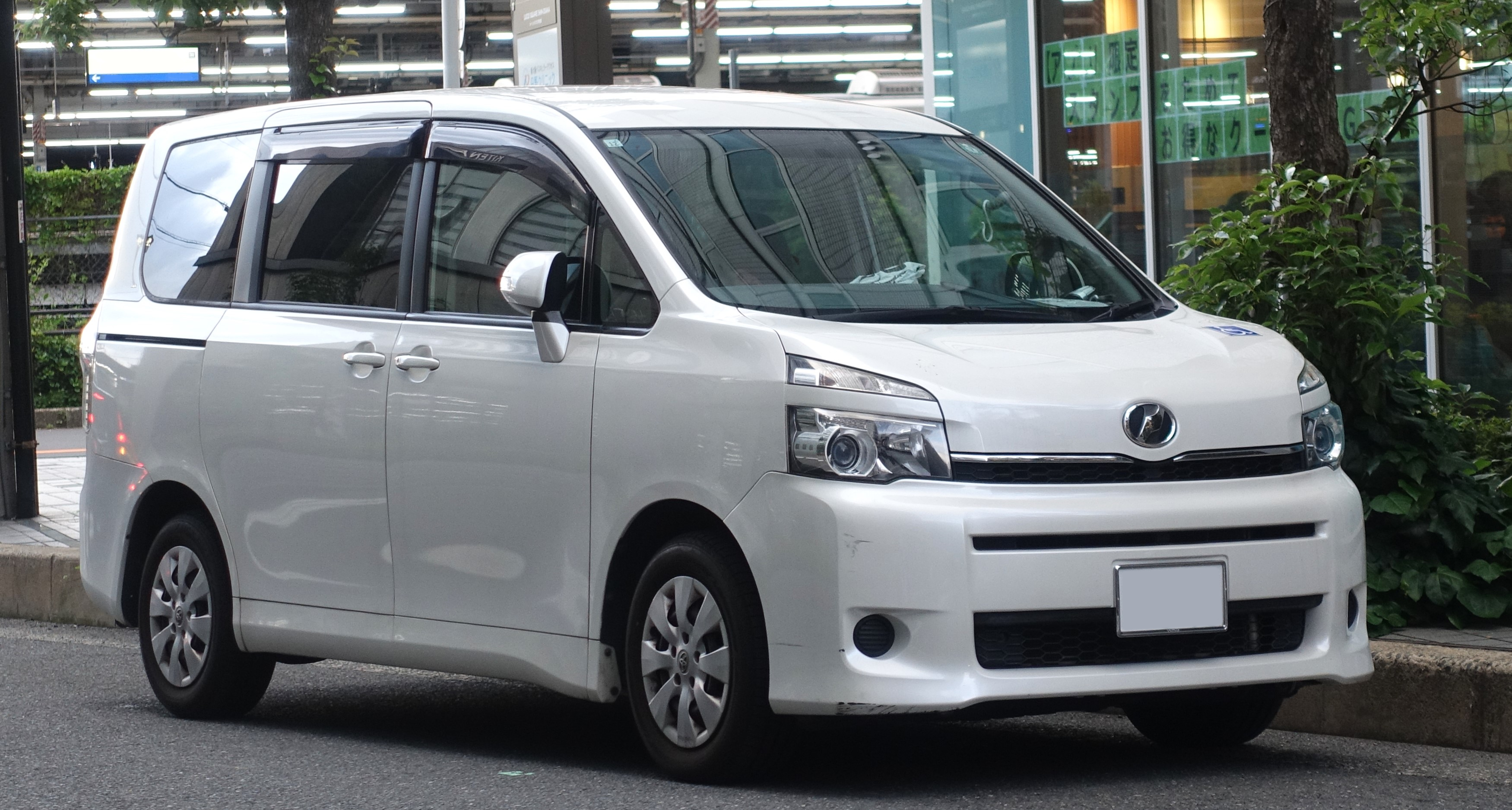
2010–2014 Voxy X (facelift)

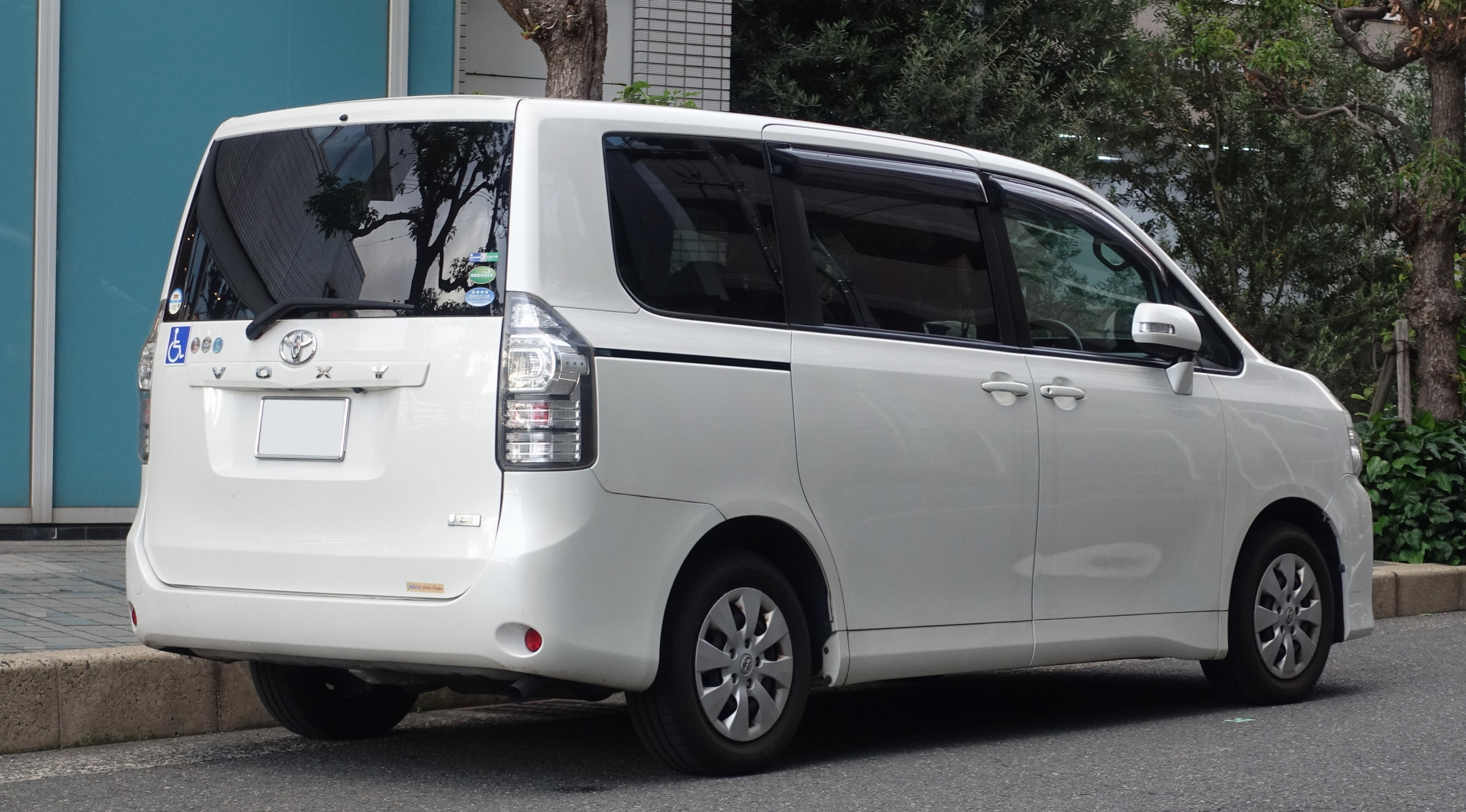
2010–2014 Voxy X (facelift)

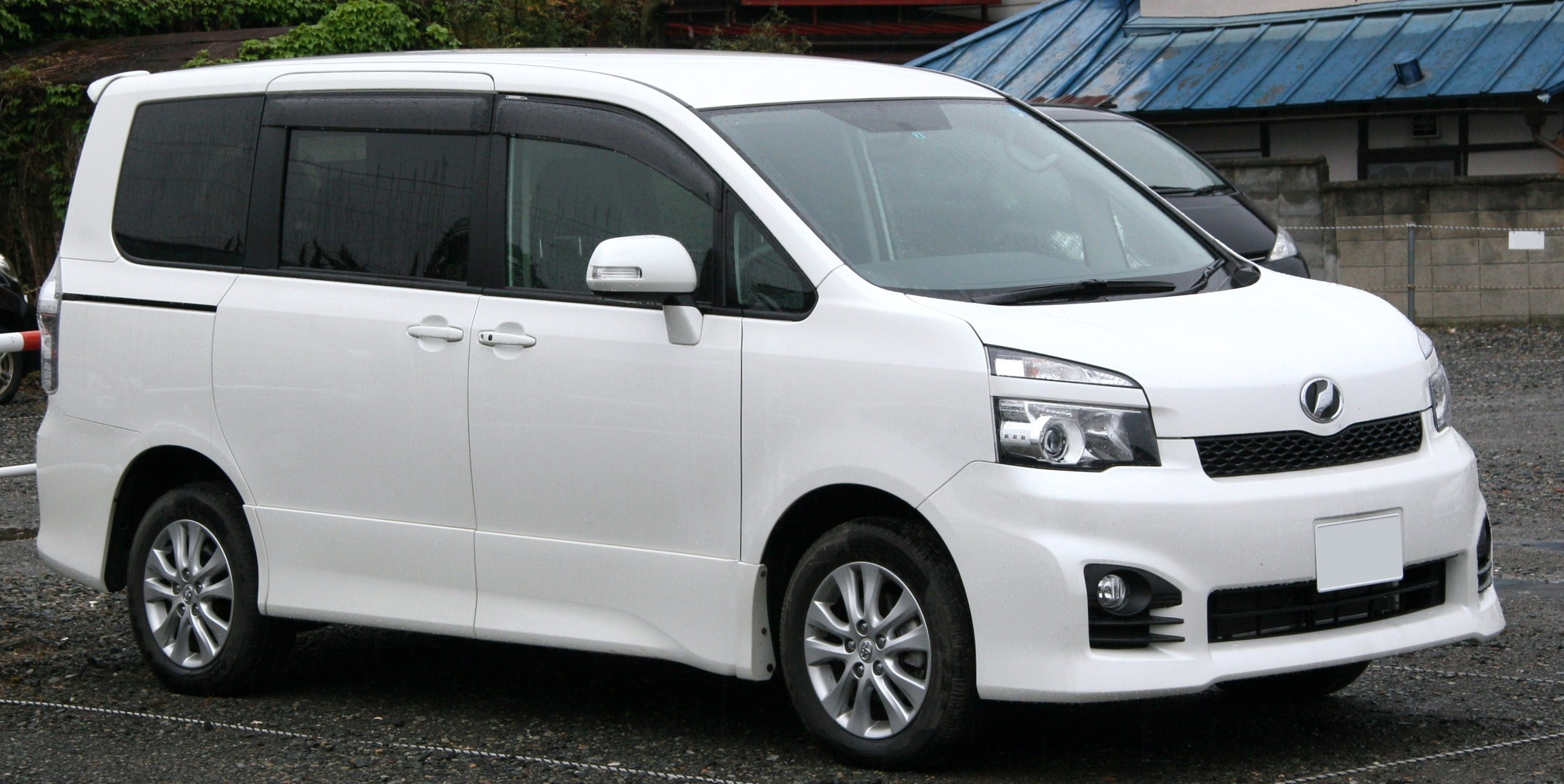
2010–2014 Voxy ZS (facelift)

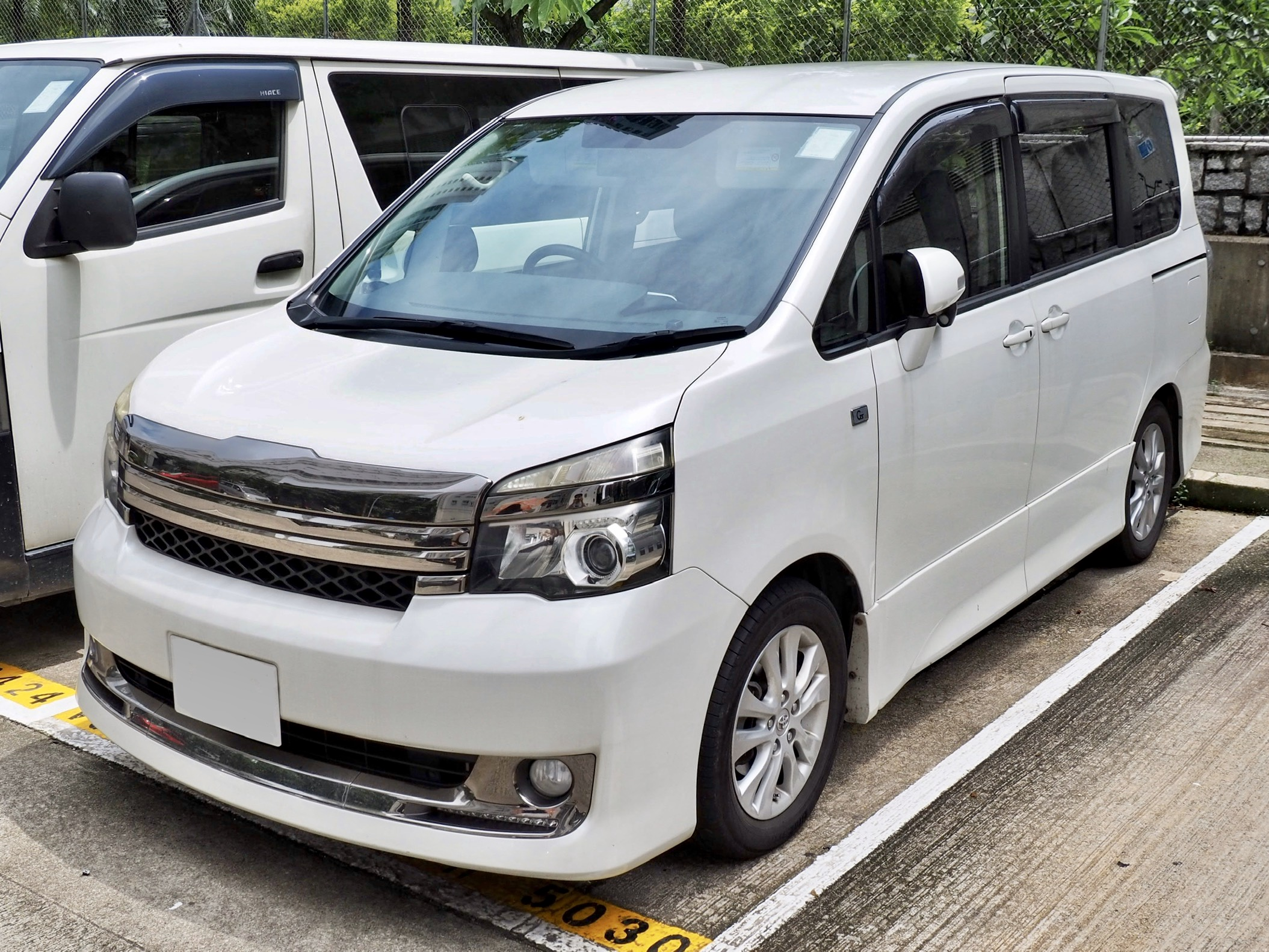
2010–2014 Voxy G's (facelift)

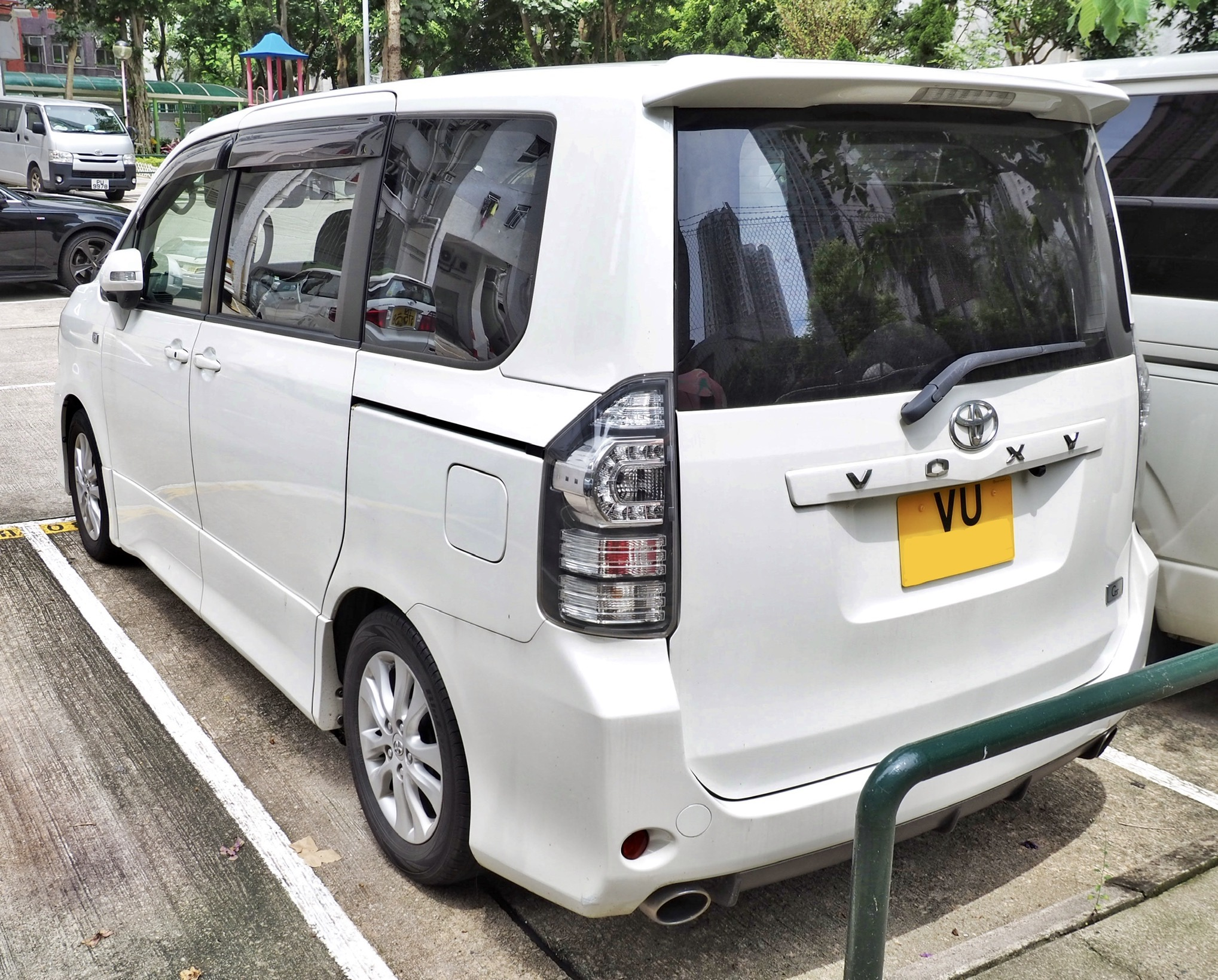
2010–2014 Voxy G's (facelift)

NAV1 (Indonesia)

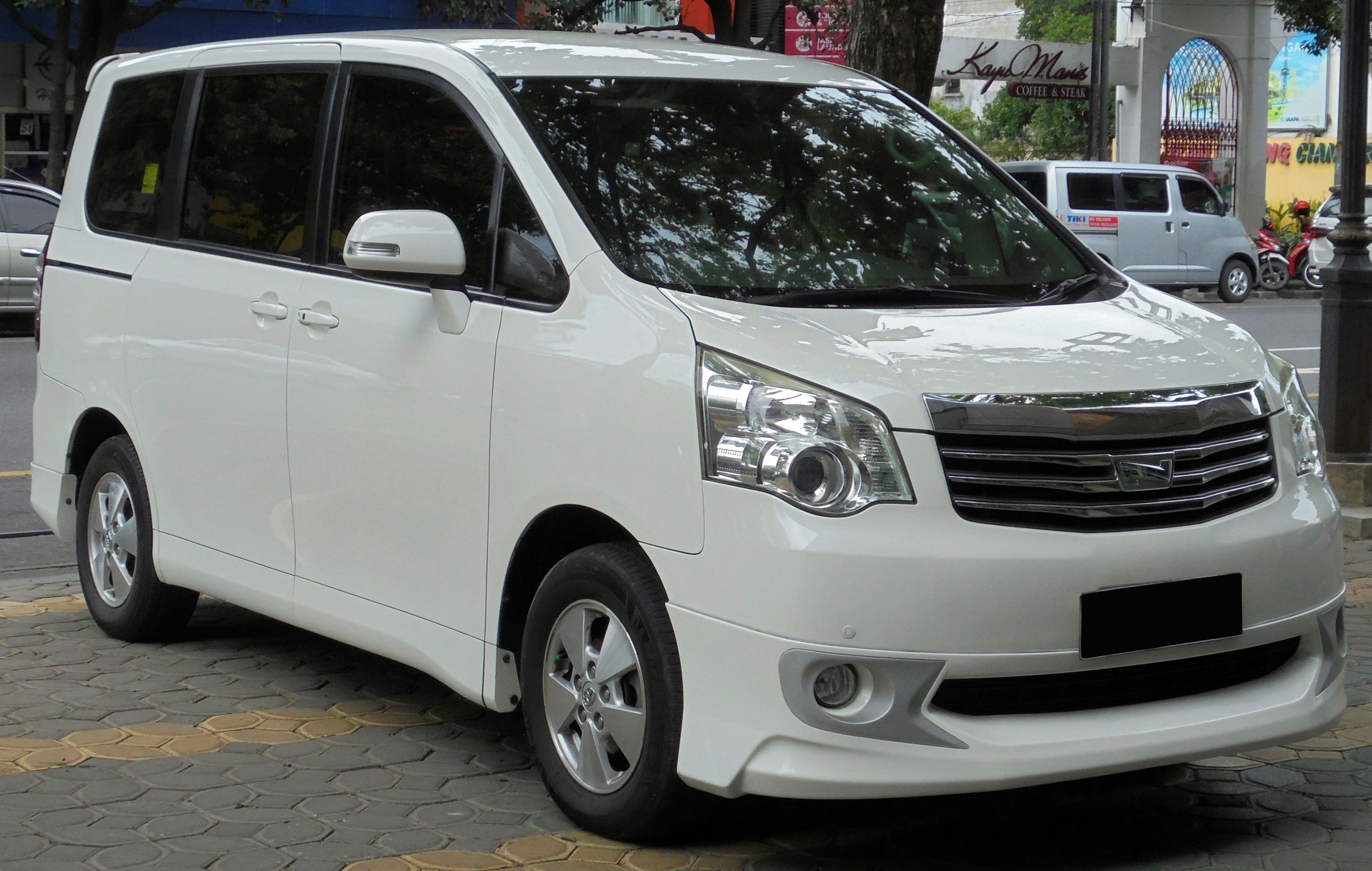
2013 Toyota NAV1 V (Indonesia)

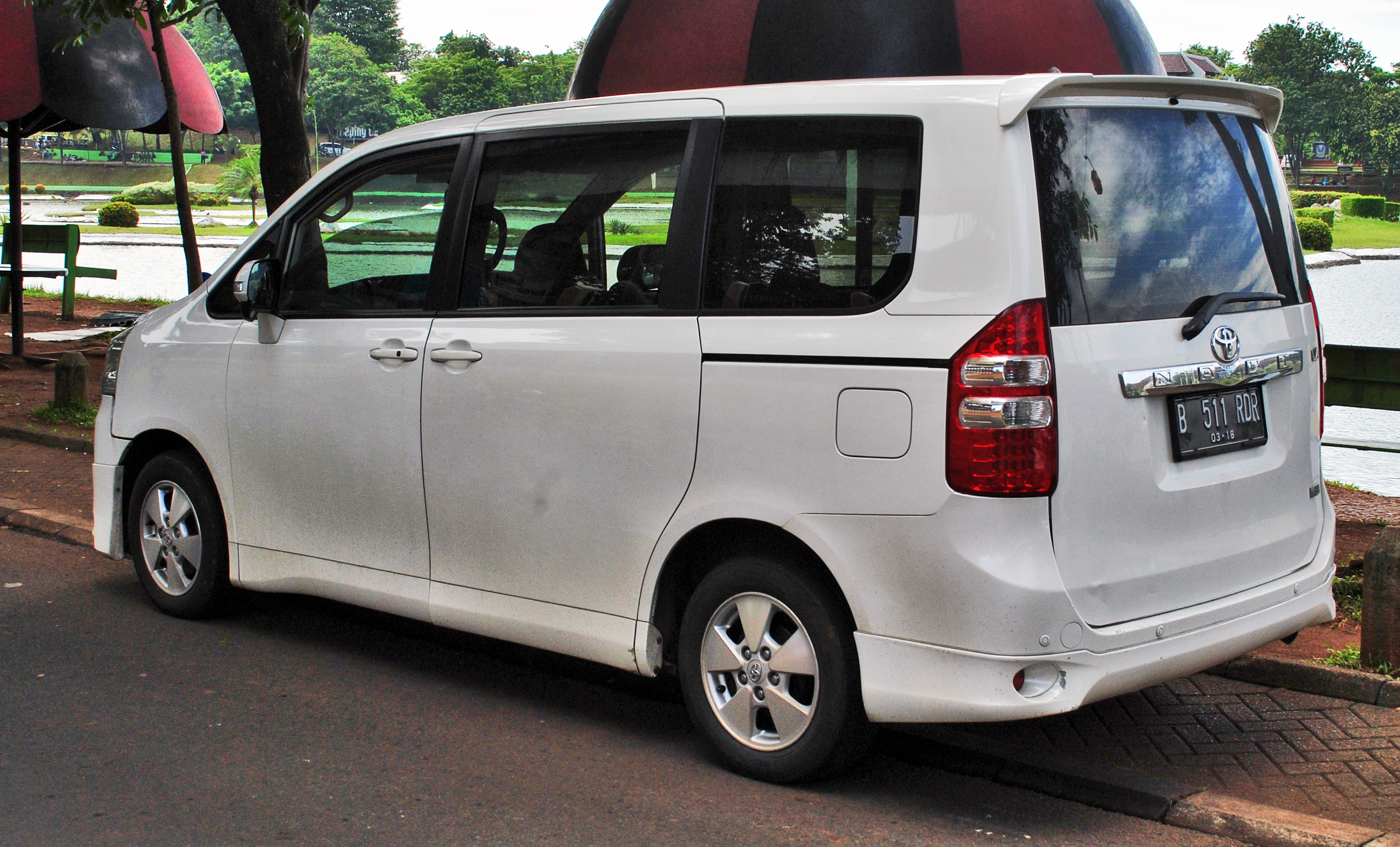
2013 NAV1 V (Indonesia)

== Third generation (R80; 2014) ==
Third generation
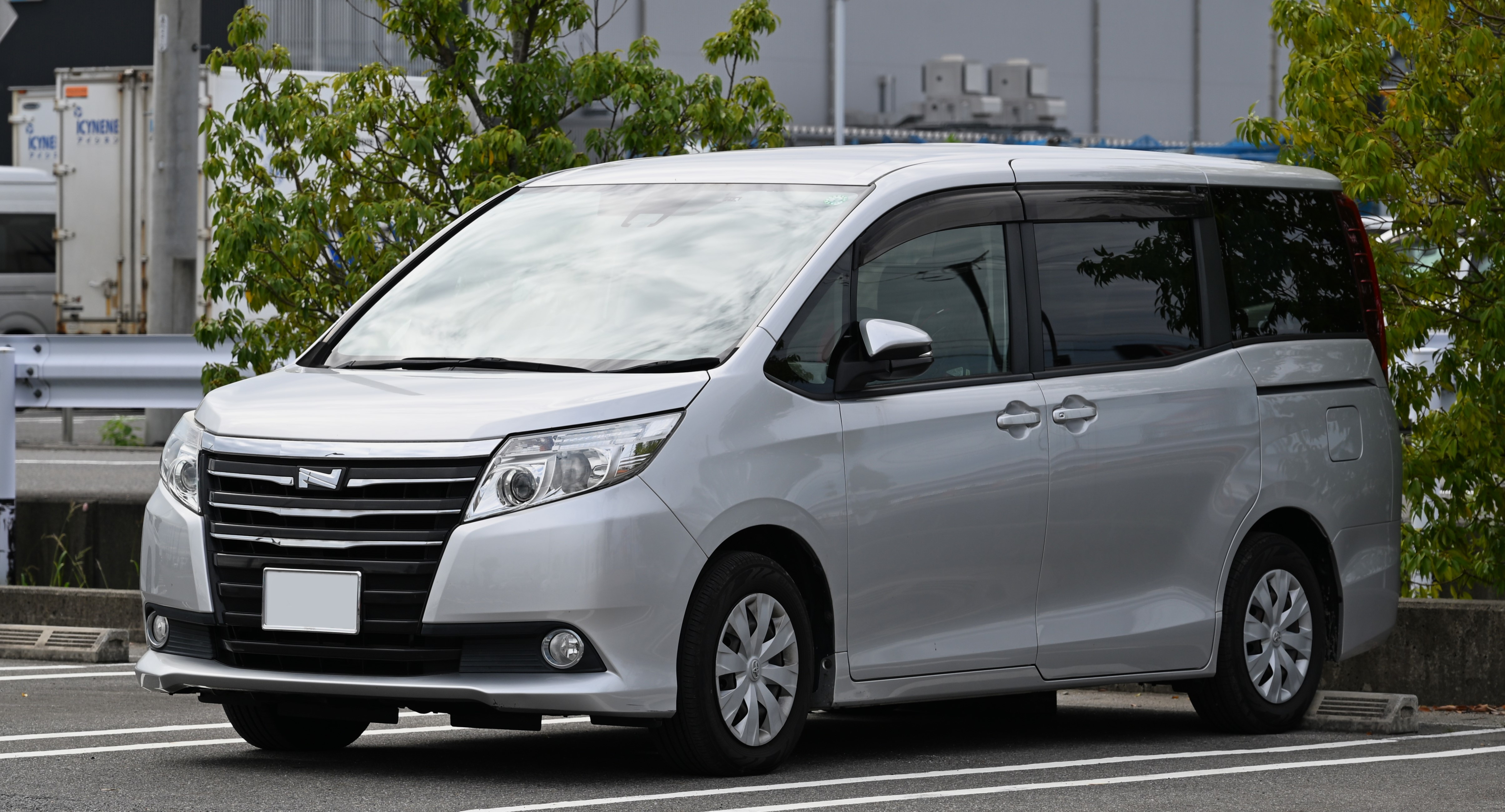
- 2014–2017 Noah X (pre-facelift)

Overview
- Model code: R80
- Also called: Toyota Voxy; Toyota Esquire
- Production: January 2014 – December 2021
- Assembly: Japan: Kariya, Aichi (Toyota Auto Body Fujimatsu Plant); Toyota, Aichi (Motomachi plant)
- Designer: Takeo Sowa (pre-facelift Noah); Shogo Tokutake (pre-facelift Noah X/G); Hiroya Kitazumi and Masanori Kinoshita (pre-facelift Noah Si); Mineo Imaiida and Tomokazu Morikawa (pre-facelift Voxy); Naoya Suzuki (pre-facelift Noah X/G and Voxy); Masaki Muromoto (pre-facelift Noah Si and Voxy)

Body and chassis
- Platform: Toyota New MC platform

Powertrain
- Engine: Petrol: 2.0 L 3ZR-FAE Valvematic I4 (ZRR80/85); Petrol hybrid: 1.8 L 2ZR-FXE I4 (ZWR80)
- Electric motor: 5JM AC synchronous (hybrid)
- Power output: 112 kW (150 hp; 152 PS) (3ZR-FAE); 73 kW (98 hp; 99 PS) (2ZR-FXE, petrol engine only); 100 kW (134 hp; 136 PS) (2ZR-FXE, combined system output); 60 kW (80 hp; 82 PS) (5JM electric motor)
- Transmission: CVT (petrol); eCVT (P410) (hybrid)
- Hybrid drivetrain: Power-split (hybrid)
- Battery: 6.5 Ah nickel–metal hydride (hybrid)

Dimensions
- Wheelbase: 2,850 mm (112.2 in)
- Length: 4,695–4,710 mm (184.8–185.4 in)
- Width: 1,695–1,735 mm (66.7–68.3 in)
- Height: 1,825–1,870 mm (71.9–73.6 in)
- Kerb weight: 1,560–1,730 kg (3,439–3,814 lb)

The third-generation Noah and Voxy were introduced on 20 January 2014. For the first time, an engine start-stop system was used to improve fuel economy. It was also the first Toyota minivan to have one-touch sliding doors. The monthly sales target was set at 3,400 units for Noah, which was sold at Toyota Corolla Store dealership chain and 4,600 units for Voxy sold at Netz Store dealerships.

At the time of launch, the Noah was offered with three grades: X "V Package", X, and Si. While the Voxy was offered with three grades: X "C Package", V, and ZS. All models availables in 4WD and FWD.

On 29 October 2014, the luxury-oriented variant, the Esquire was unveiled, which was marketed as a more luxurious version of the Noah. It was offered with 2 grades: Xi and Gi. Both petrol and hybrid versions are available for each trim level. The petrol variant offers front-wheel and all-wheel drive options. The hybrid version is only available in front-wheel drive. it is sold through Toyota and Toyopet dealers.

The lower grade levels of the third-generation Noah (without the "aero body" package, which came standard for the Voxy and Esquire) maximized its exterior dimensions within Japanese dimension regulations by increasing its length by 100 mm (3.9 in) to 4,695 mm (184.8 in). By adopting a newly developed low-floor platform, the overall height of the third-generation model is reduced by 25 mm (1.0 in) compared to the previous model, while the interior height is increased by 60 mm (2.4 in) to 1,400 mm (55.1 in).

In January 2016, the Noah/Voxy/Esquire received Toyota Safety Sense C, which incorporated features such as collision warning, lane assist, as well as high beam assist. The Noah/Voxy/Esquire also received Toyota's T-Connect services.

The Noah/Voxy/Esquire received a facelift on 3 July 2017 with changes to the lights, hood, bumper and the front fender. It was discontinued in late 2021.

=== Indonesia ===
The facelifted third-generation Voxy was launched in Indonesia on 10 August 2017. Unlike the preceding NAV1, which was assembled locally, the Voxy was imported from Japan. Export to Indonesia began in July 2017. It was only offered in one grade equivalent to the Japanese ZS grade.

=== Gallery ===
Noah

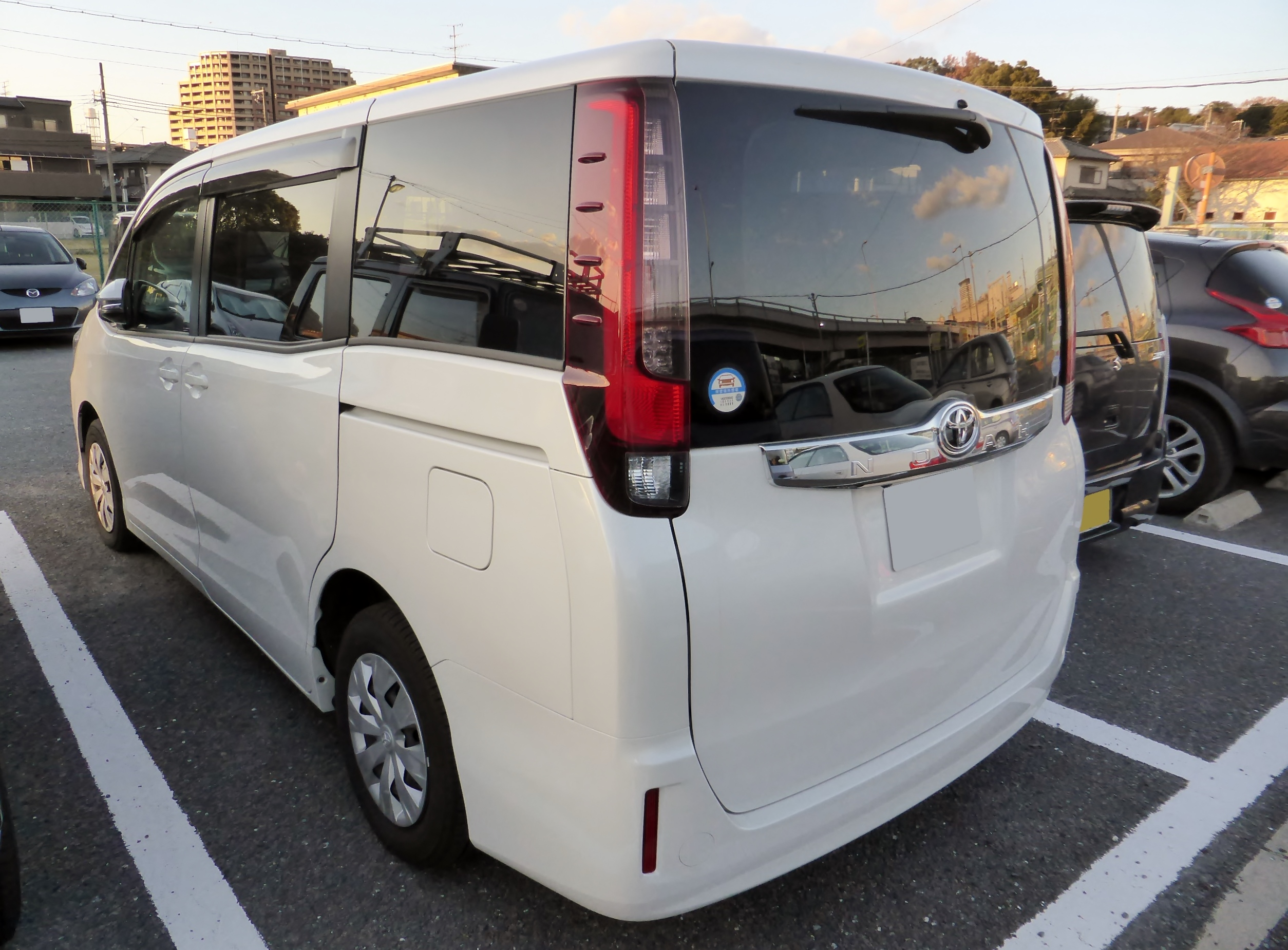
2014–2017 Noah G (pre-facelift)

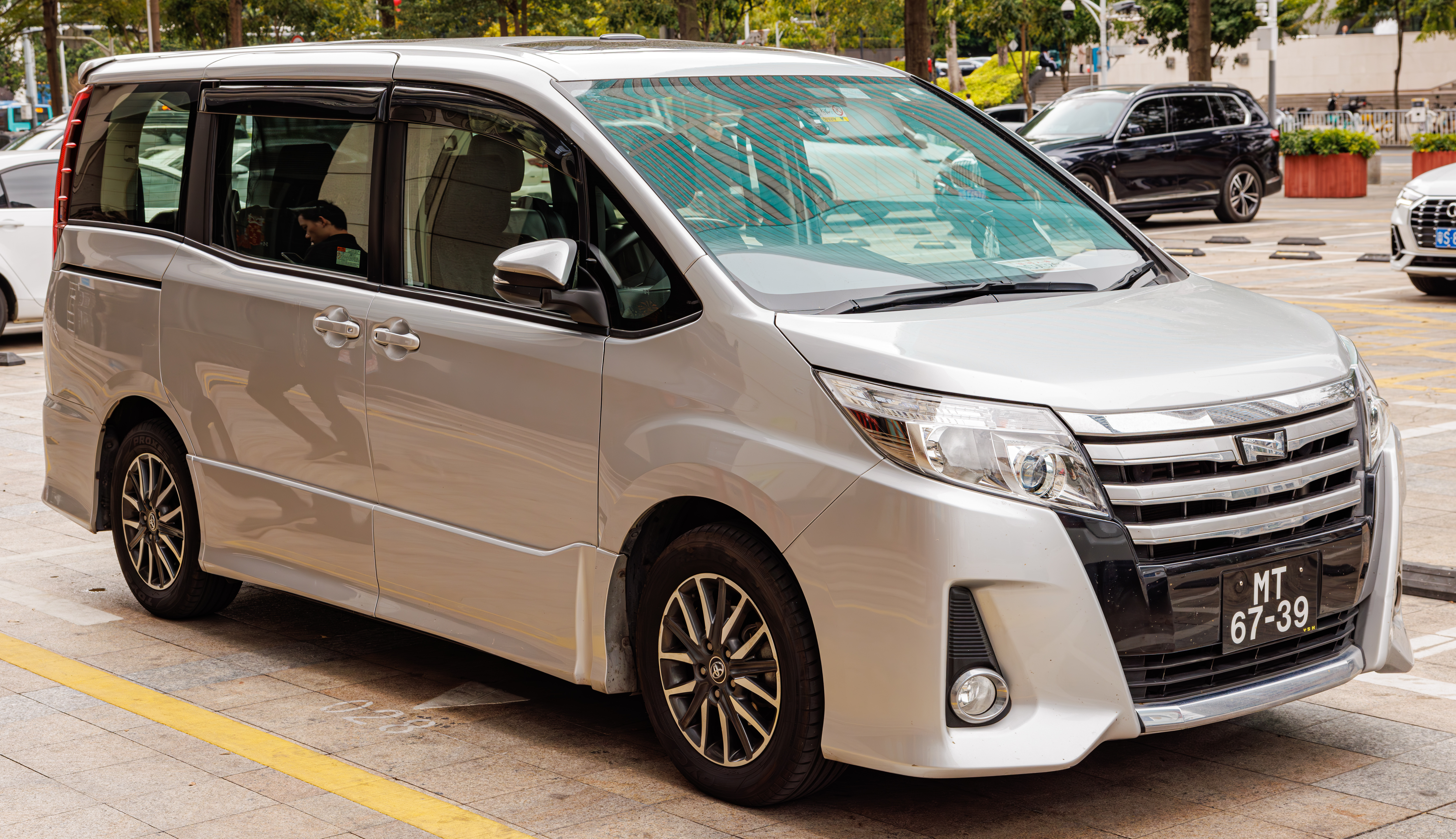
2014–2017 Noah Si (pre-facelift)

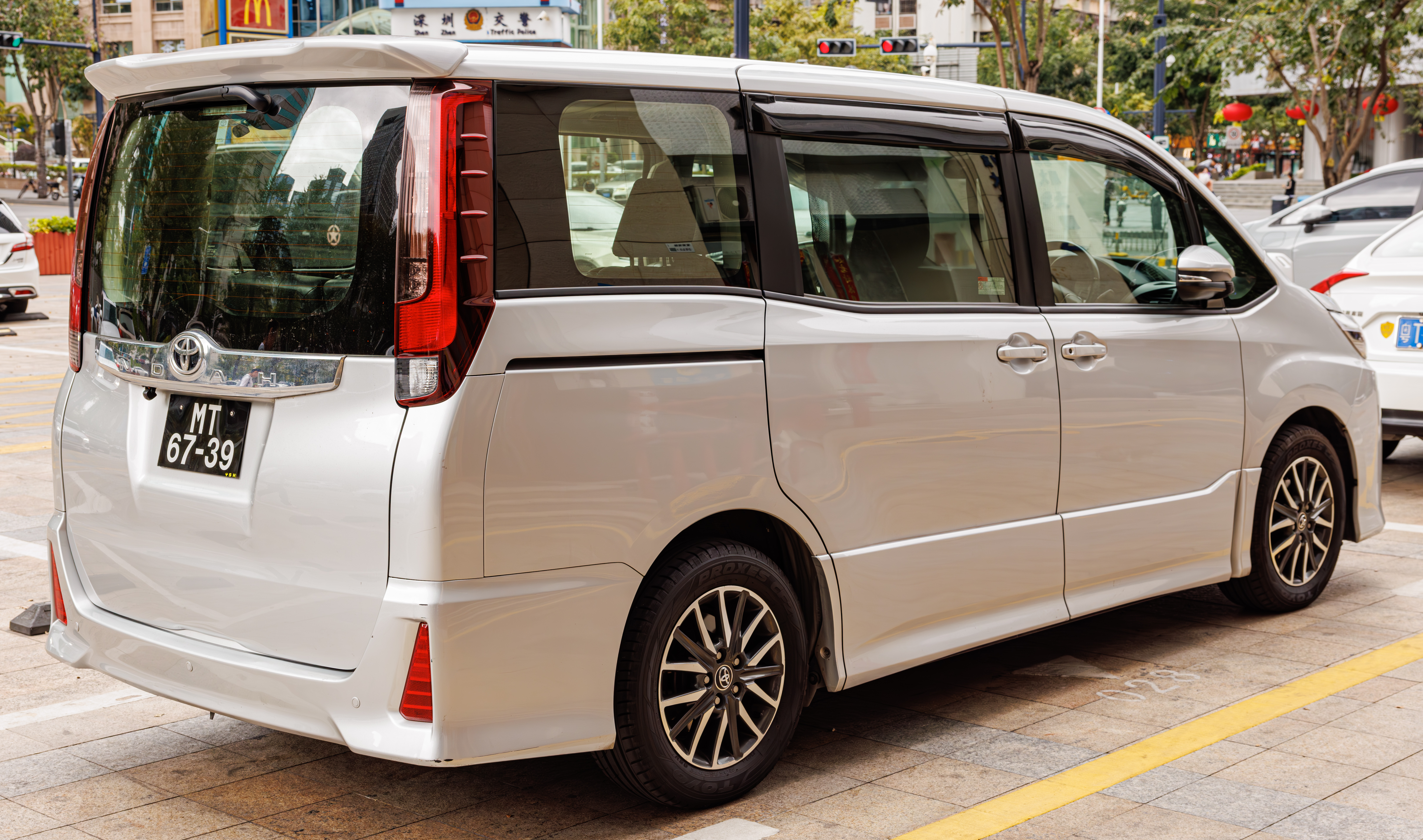
2014–2017 Noah Si (pre-facelift)

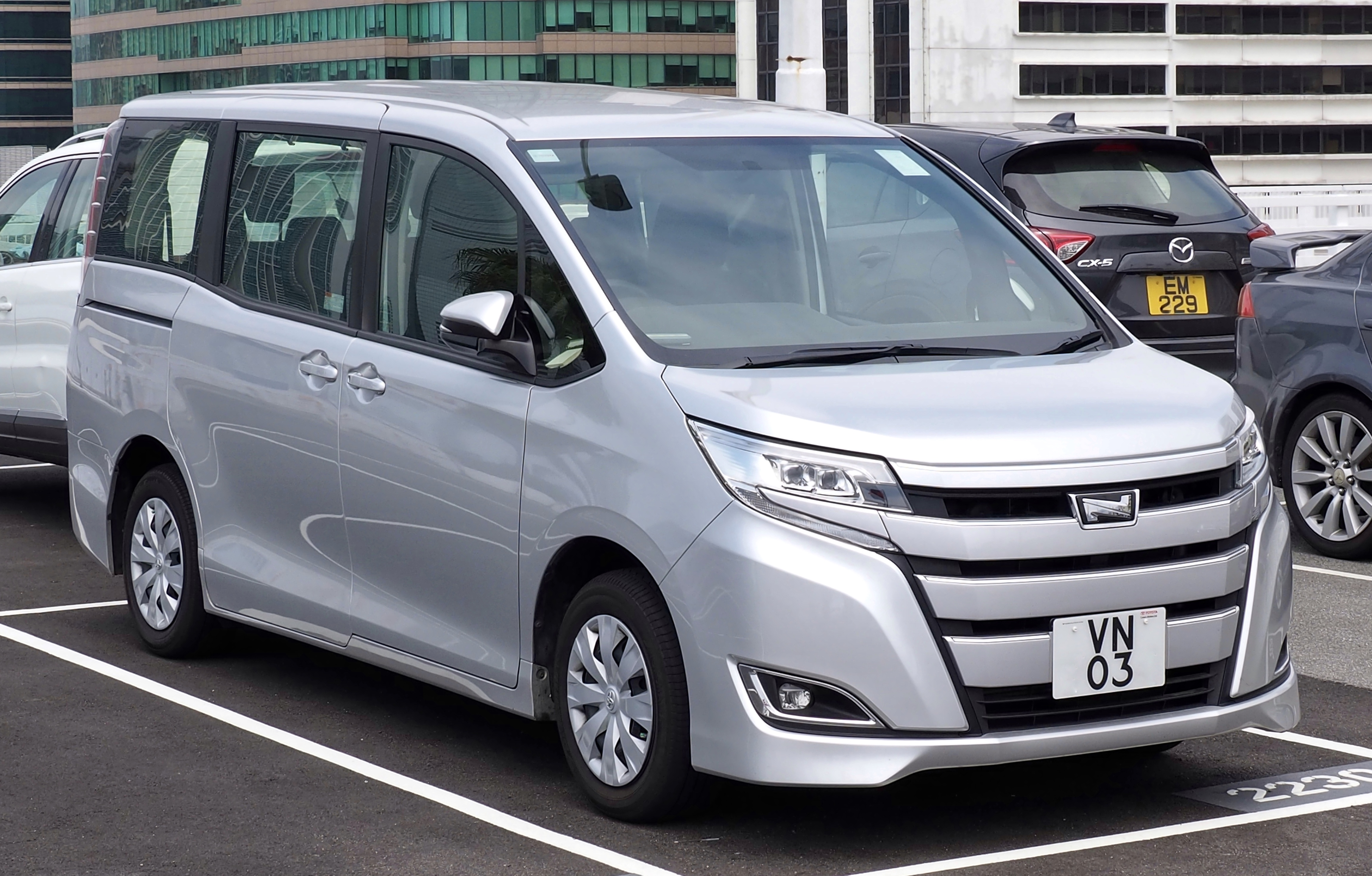
2017–2021 Noah X (facelift)

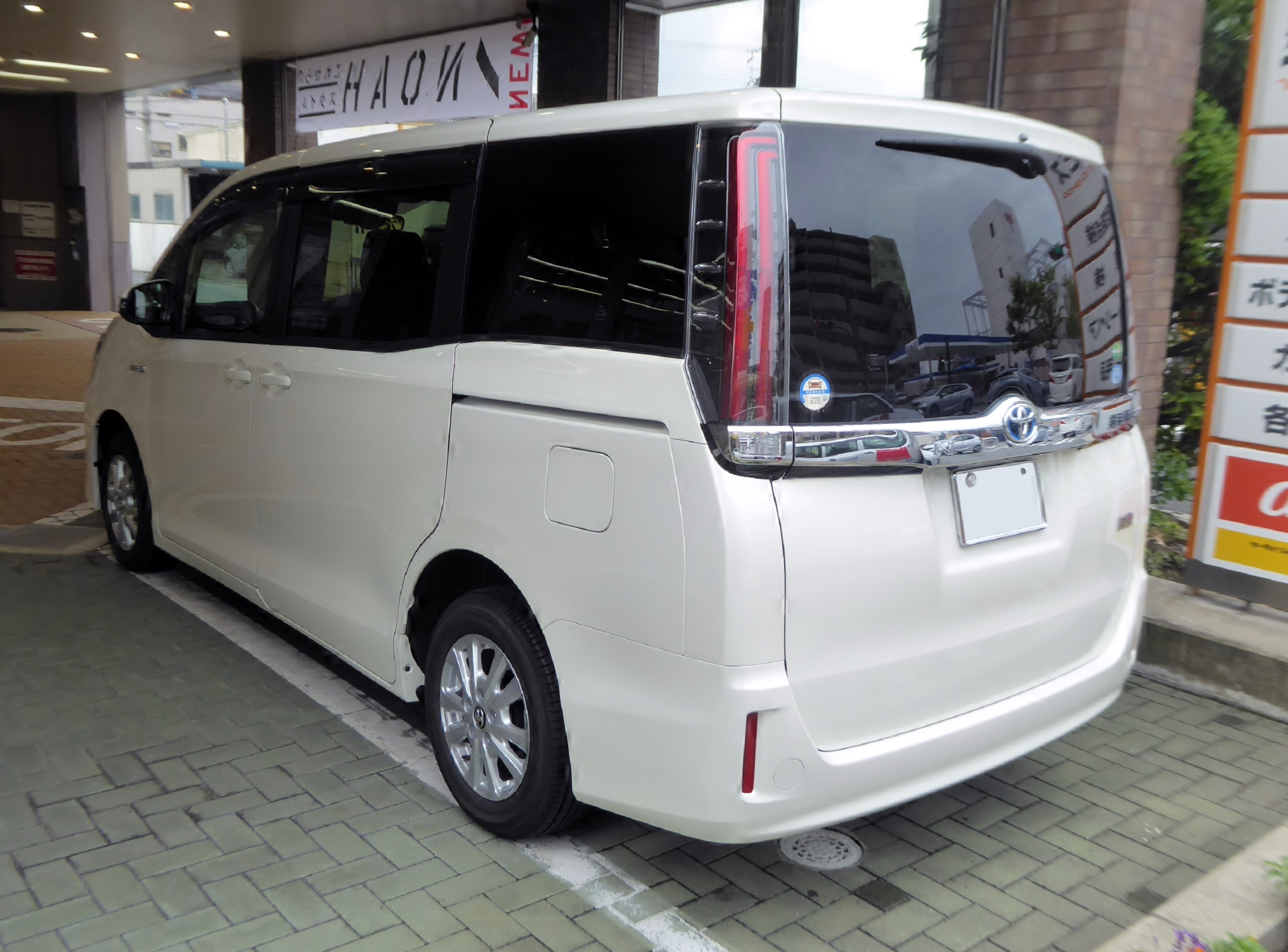
2017–2021 Noah Hybrid X (facelift)

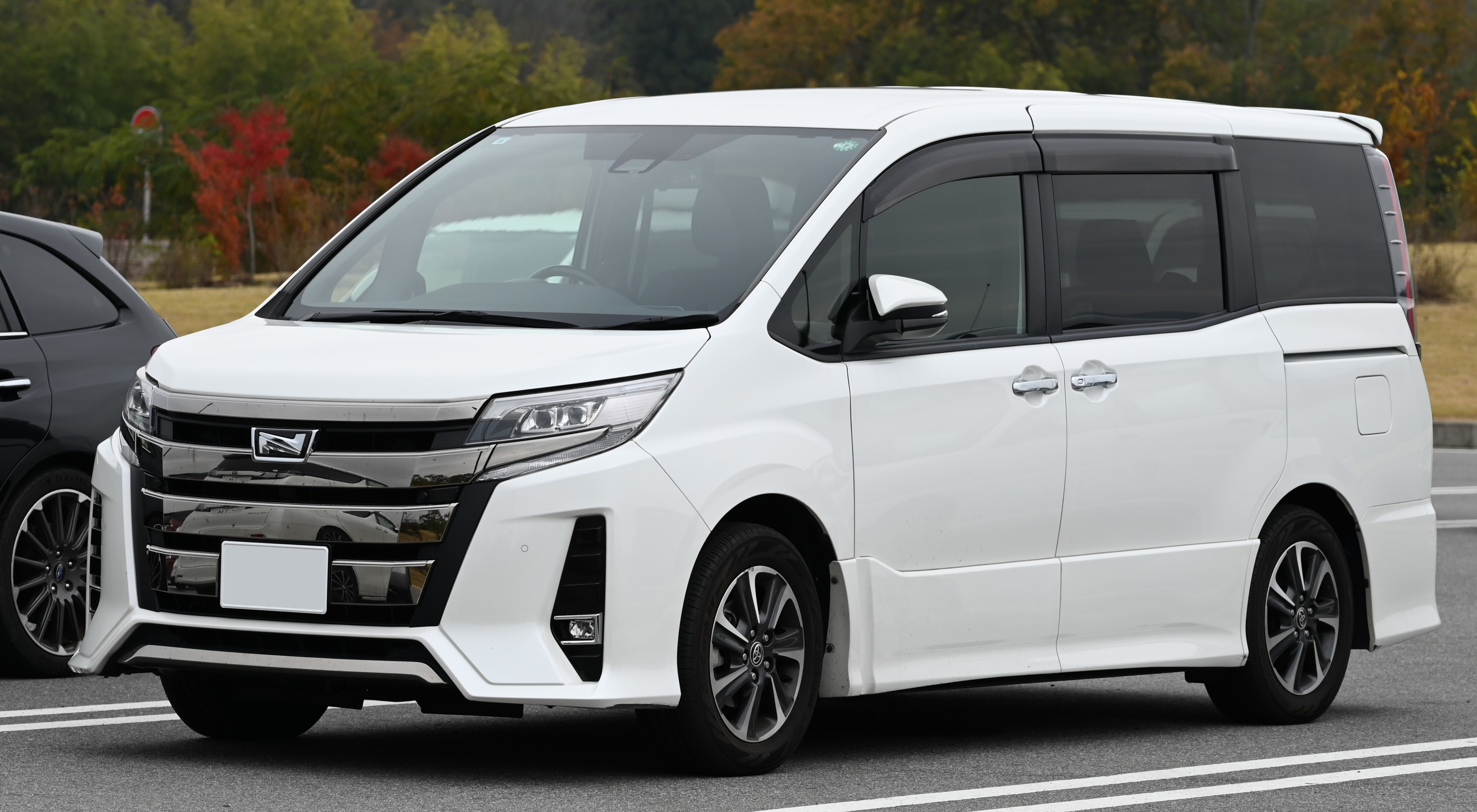
2017–2021 Noah Si (facelift)

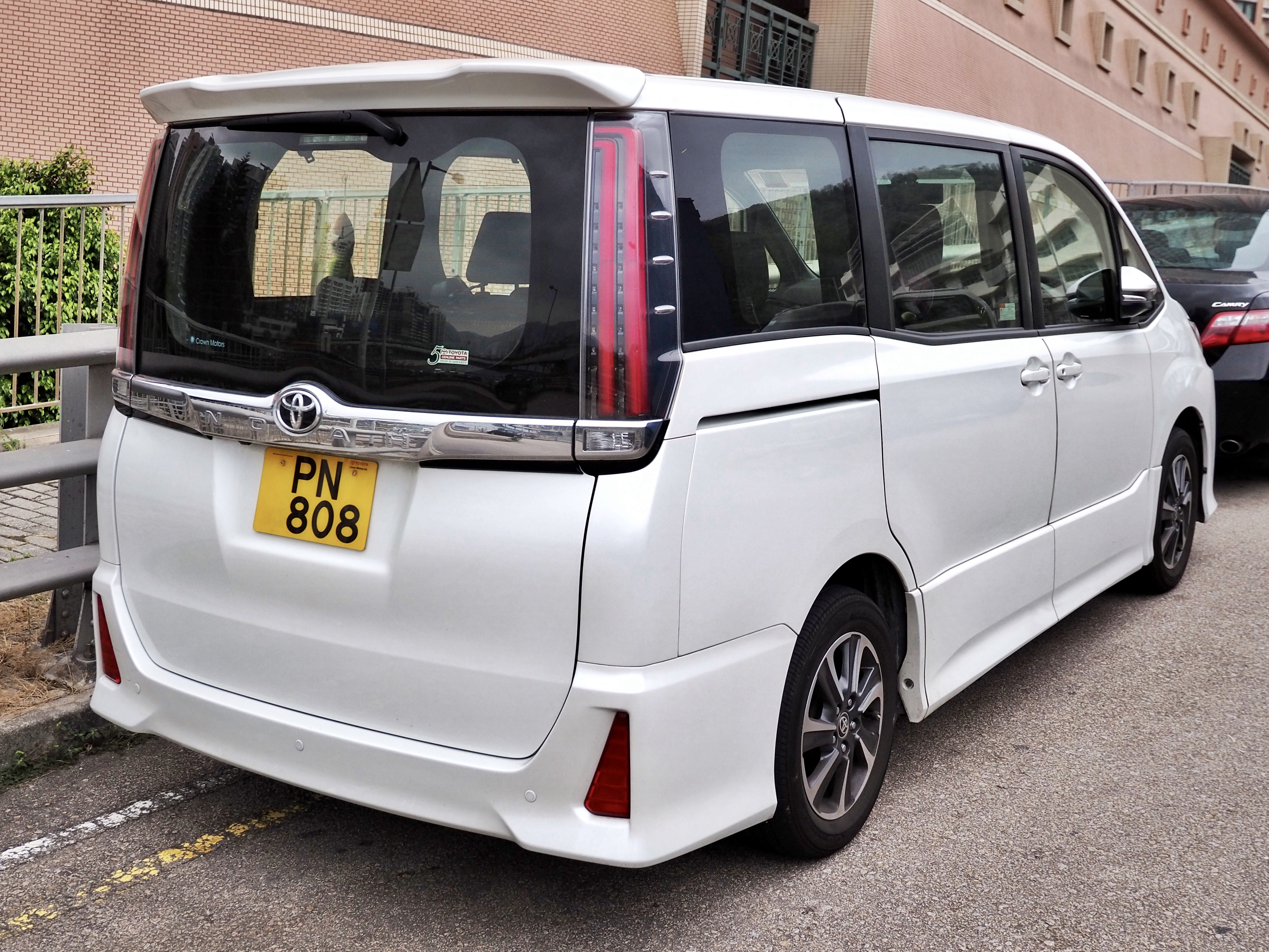
2017–2021 Noah Si (facelift)

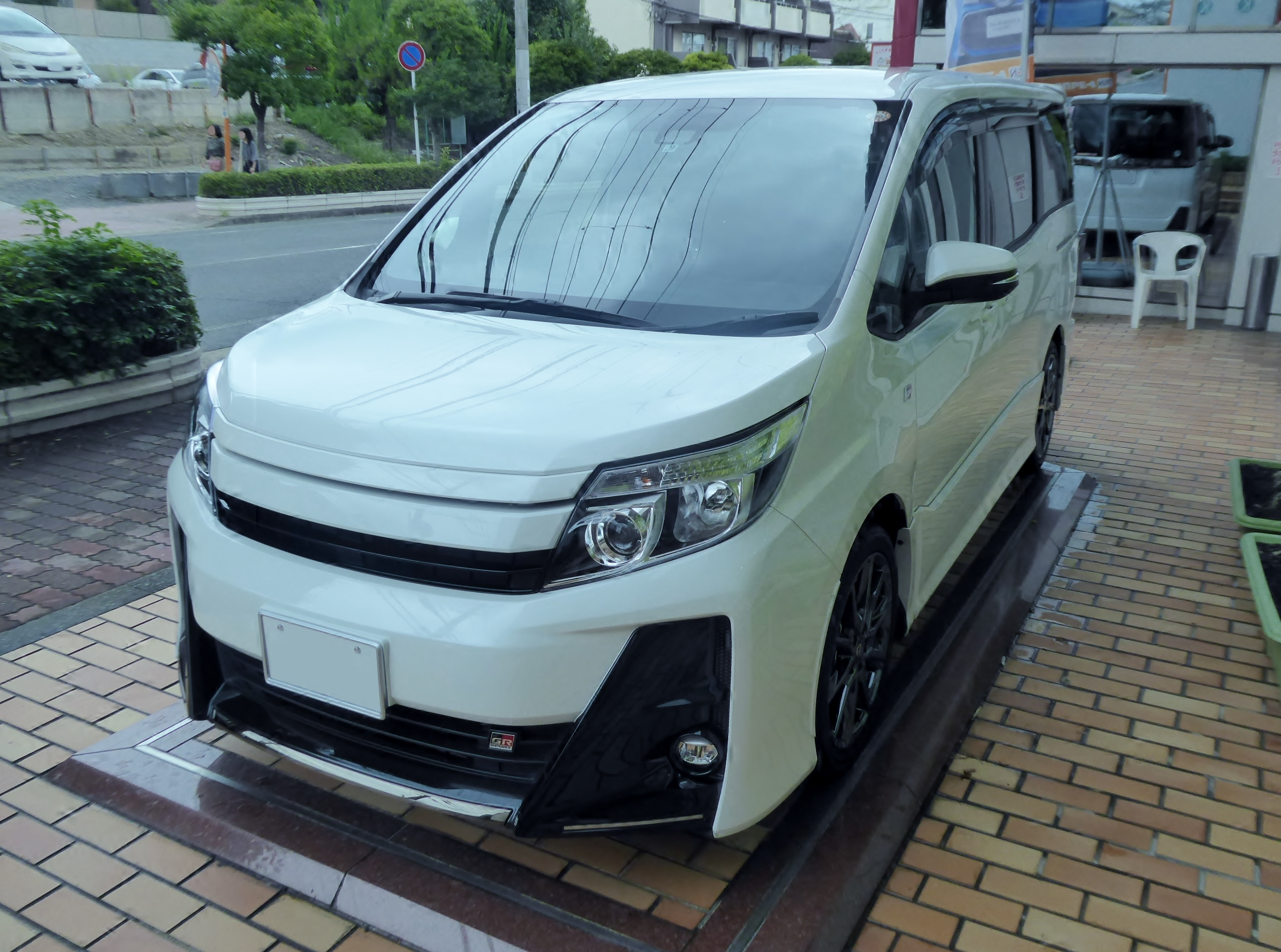
Noah Si GR Sport

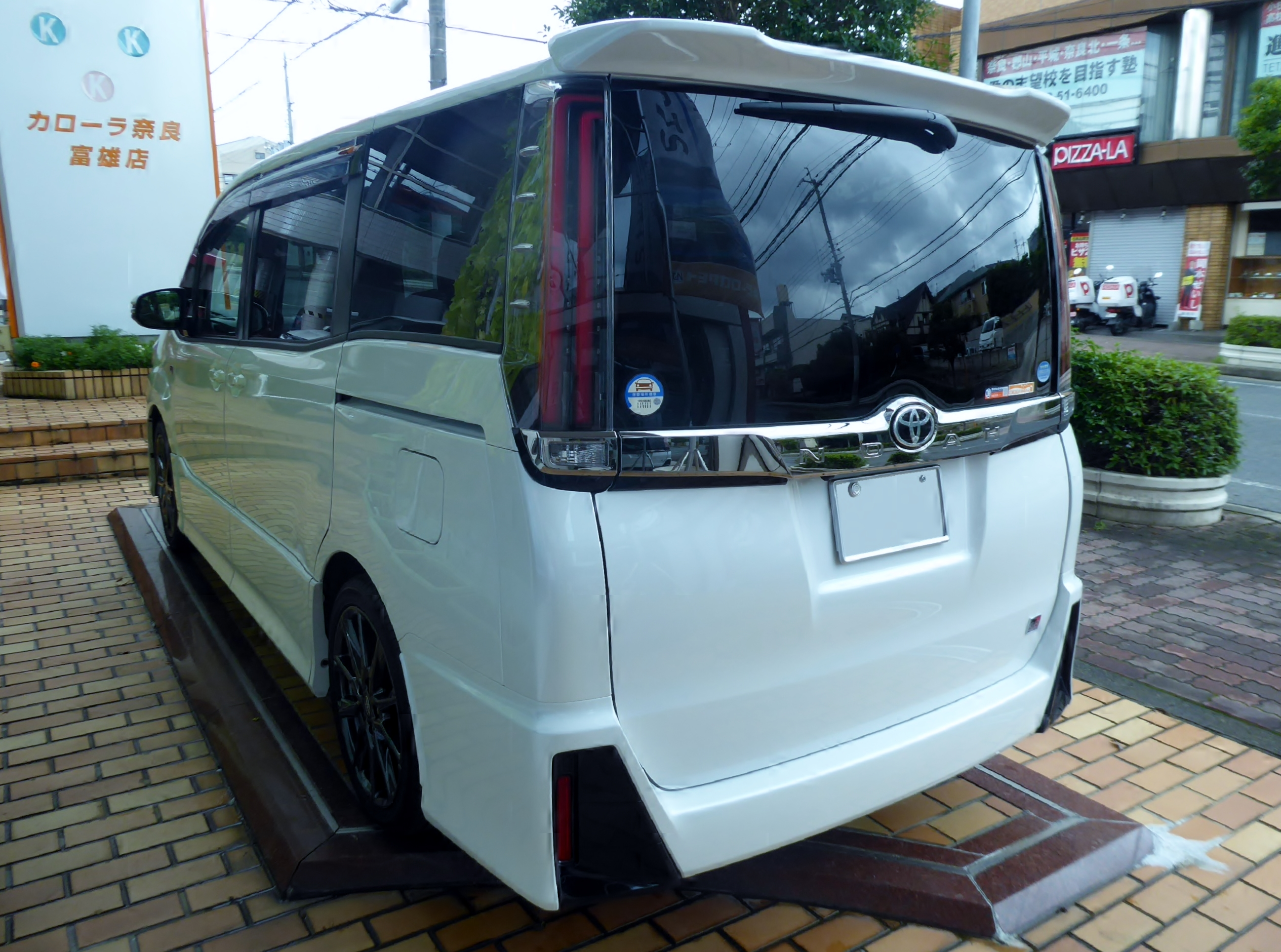
Noah Si GR Sport

Voxy

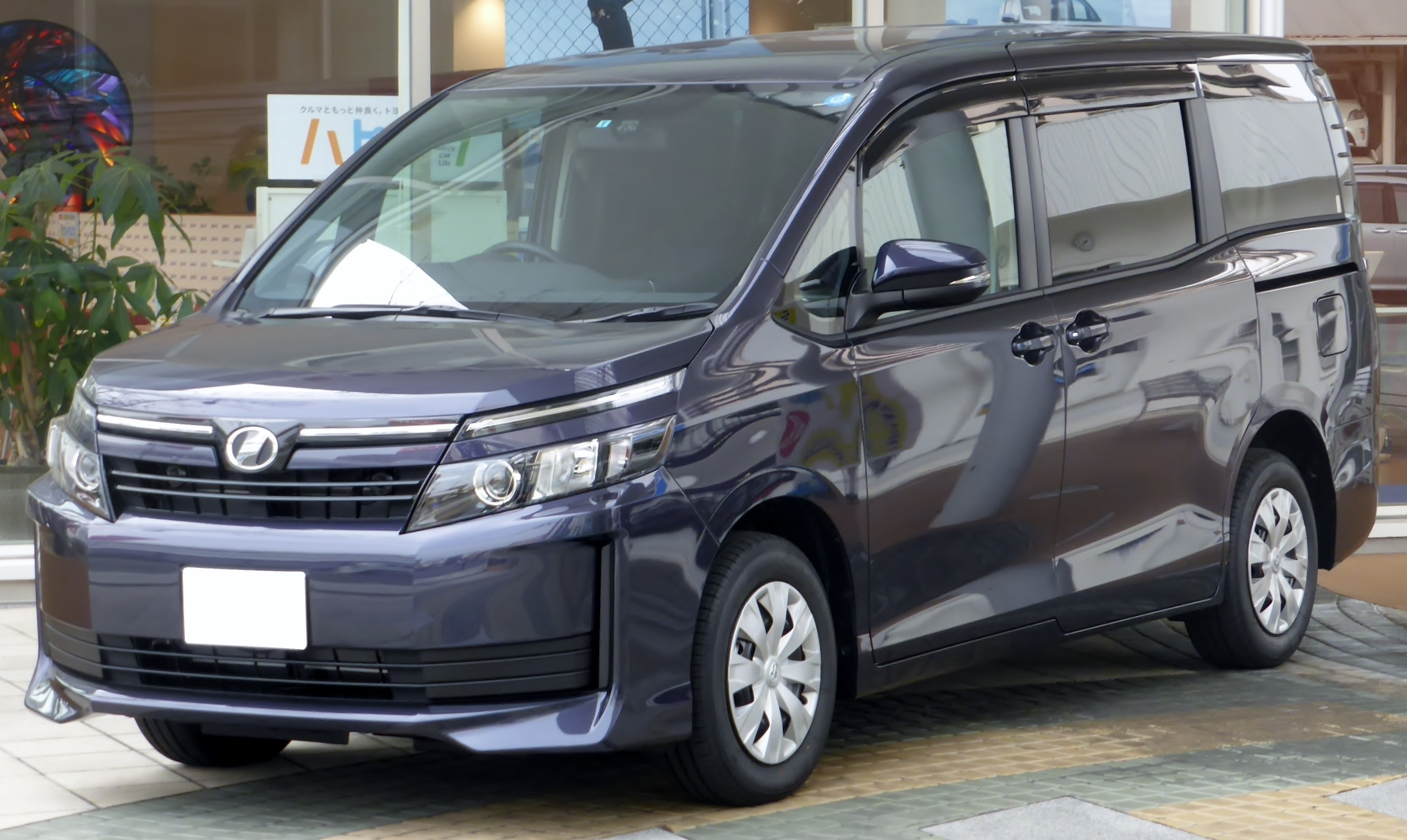
2014–2017 Voxy X C Package (pre-facelift)

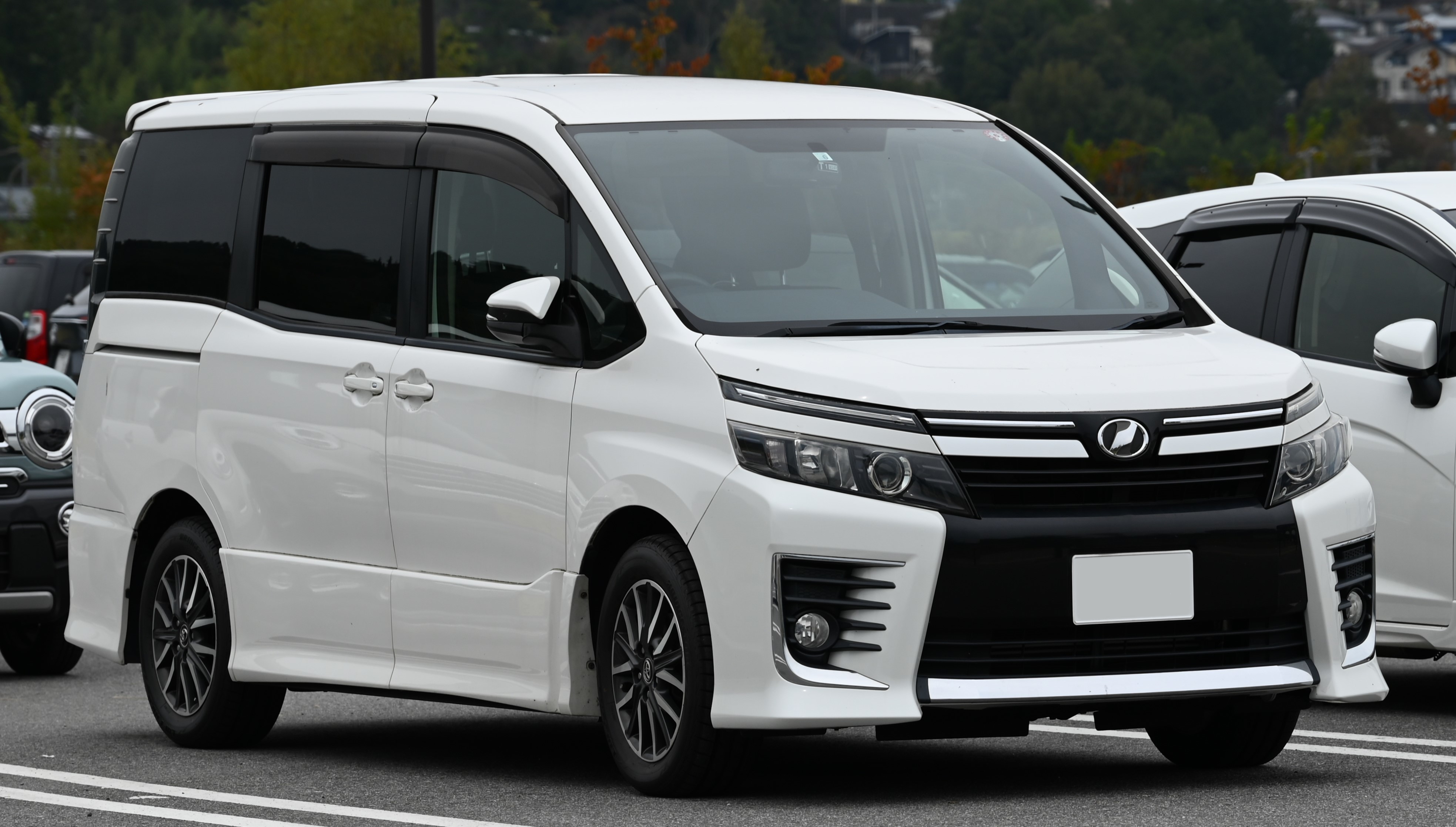
2014–2017 Voxy ZS (pre-facelift)

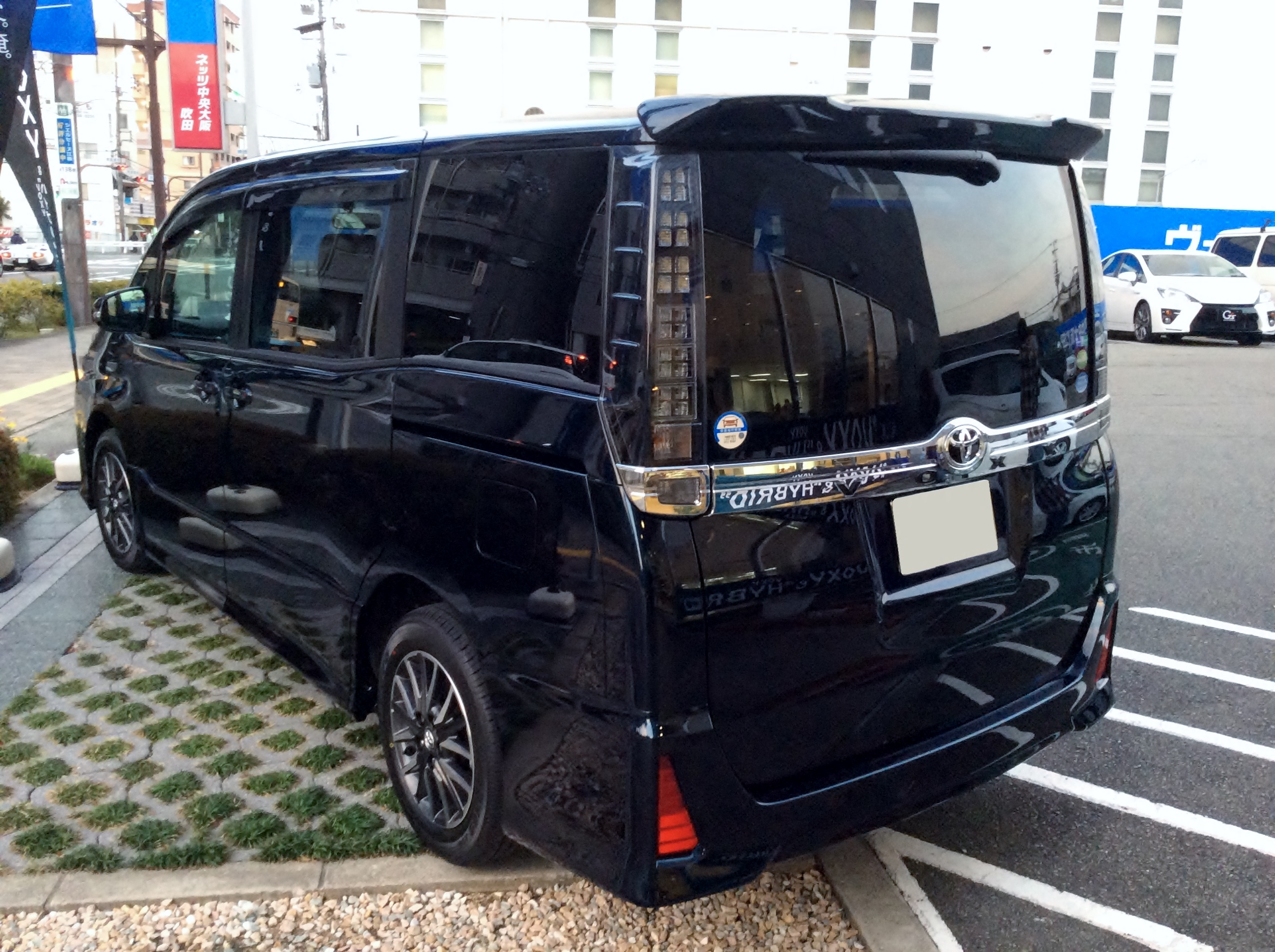
2014–2017 Voxy ZS (pre-facelift)

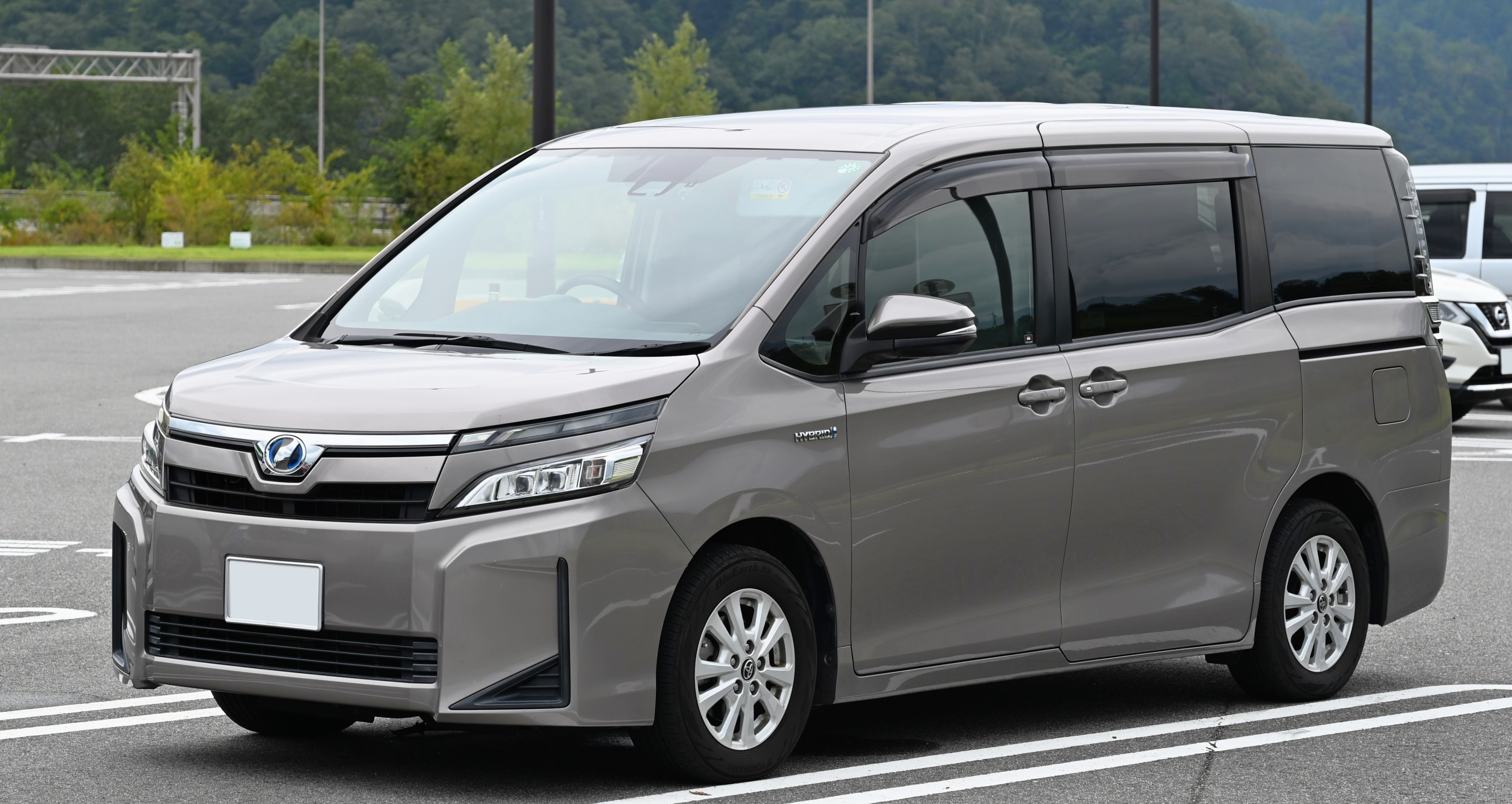
2017–2021 Voxy Hybrid X (facelift)

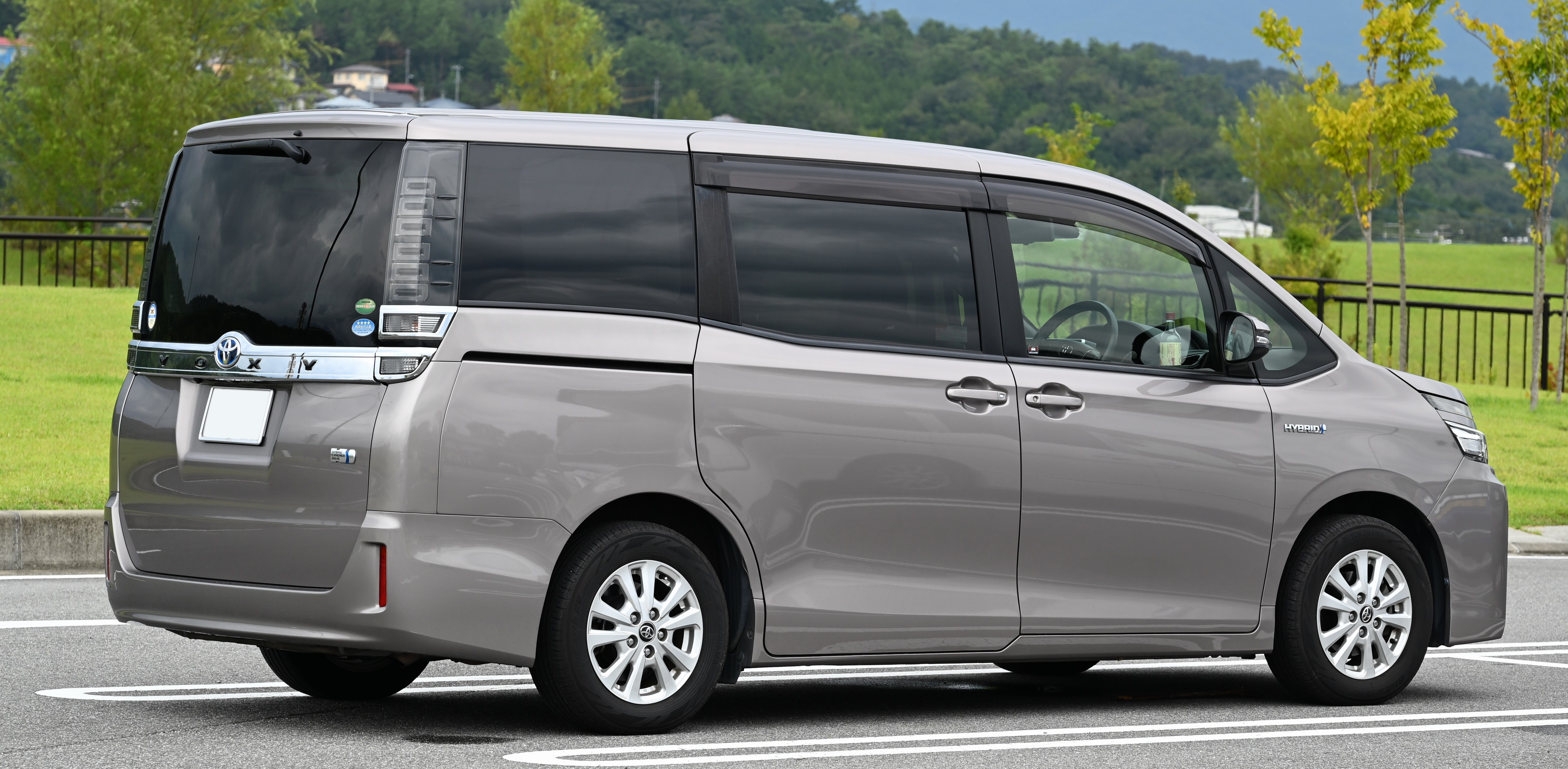
2017–2021 Voxy Hybrid X (facelift)

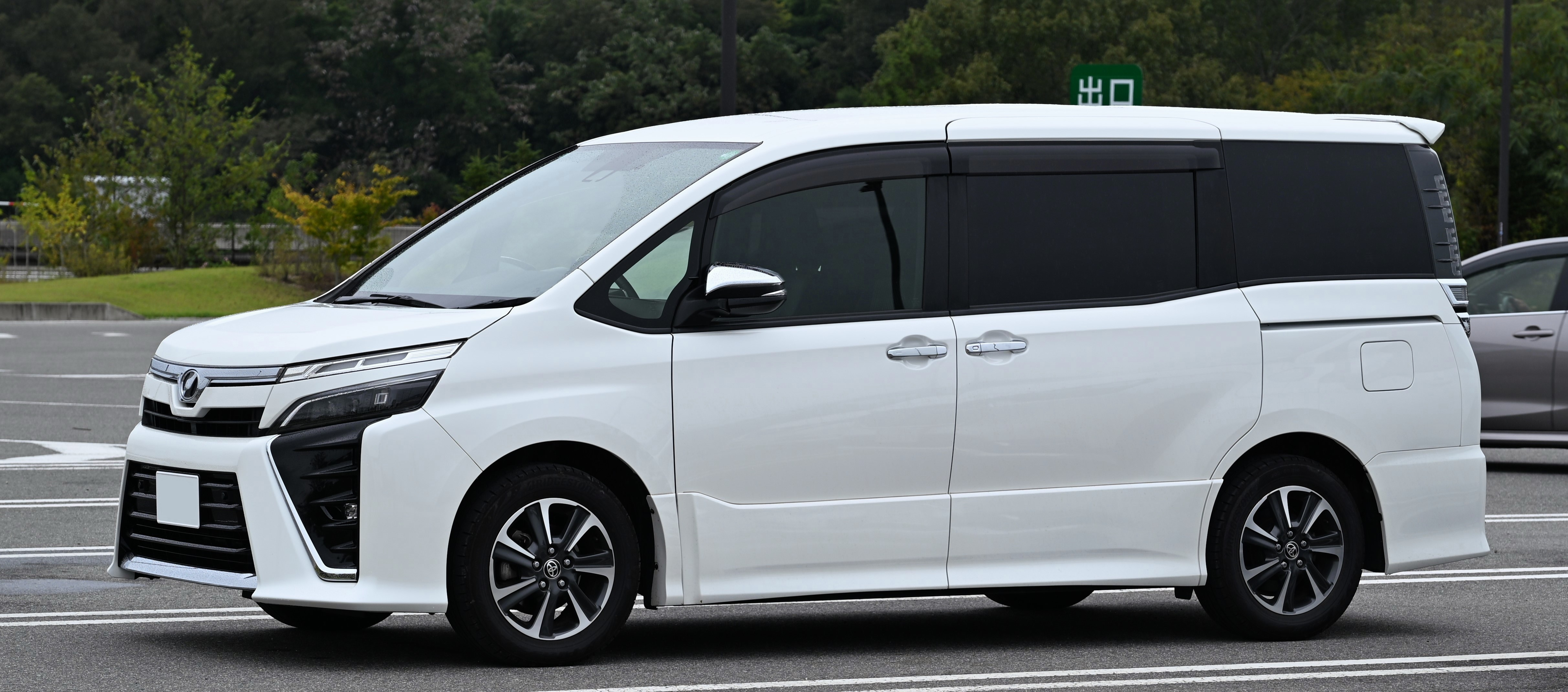
2020 Voxy ZS Kirameki II (facelift)

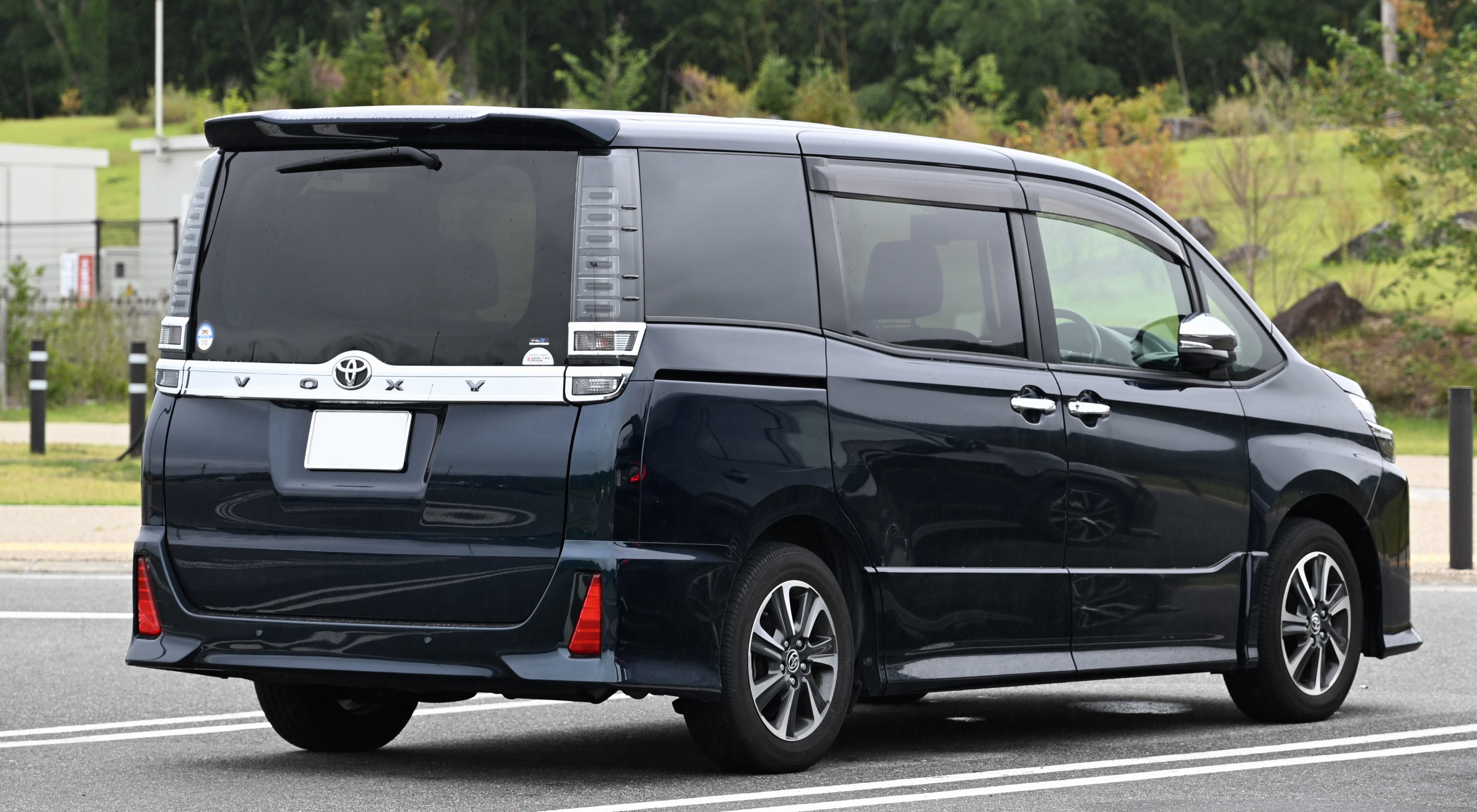
2020 Voxy ZS Kirameki II (facelift)

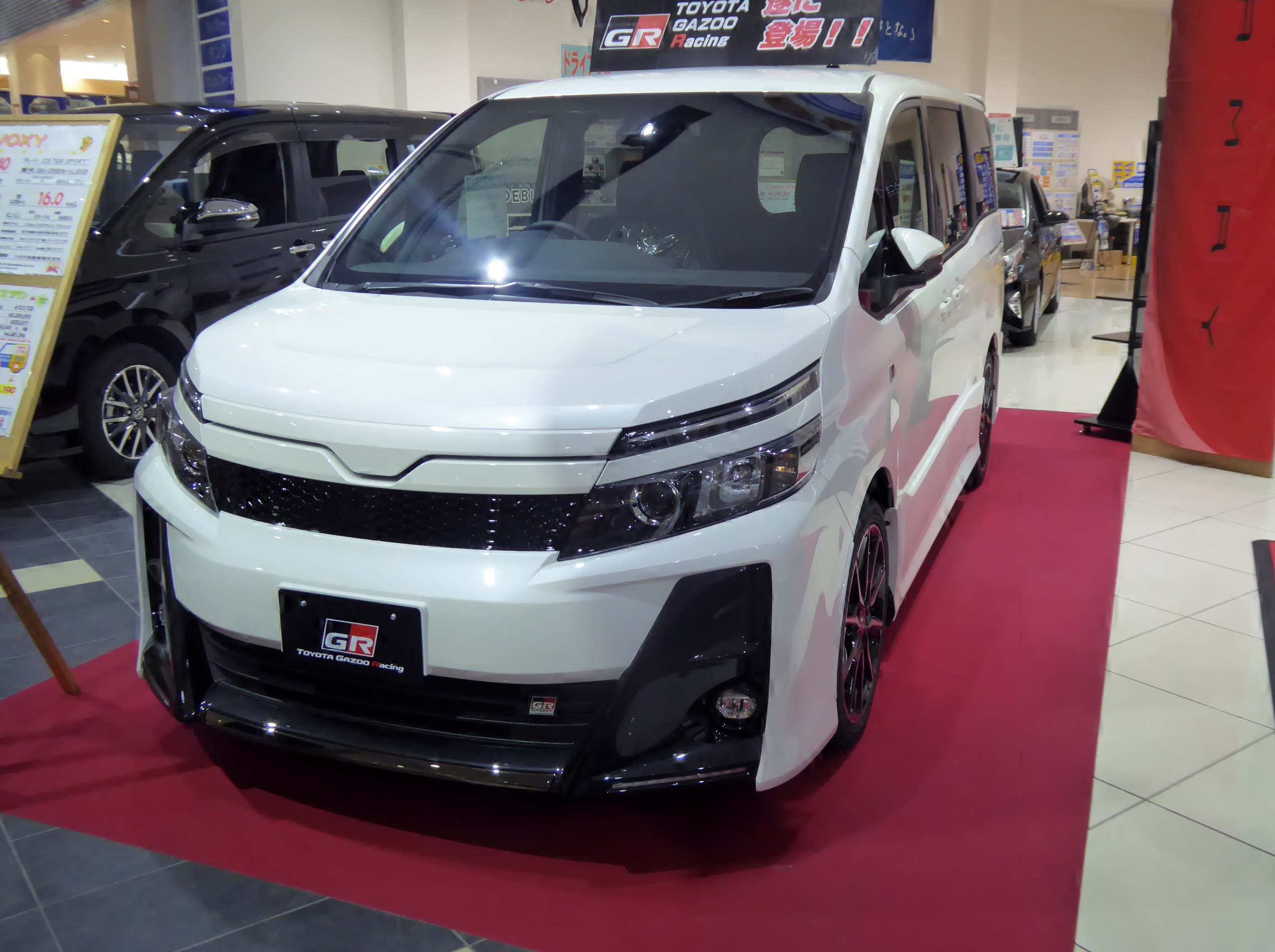
Voxy ZS GR Sport

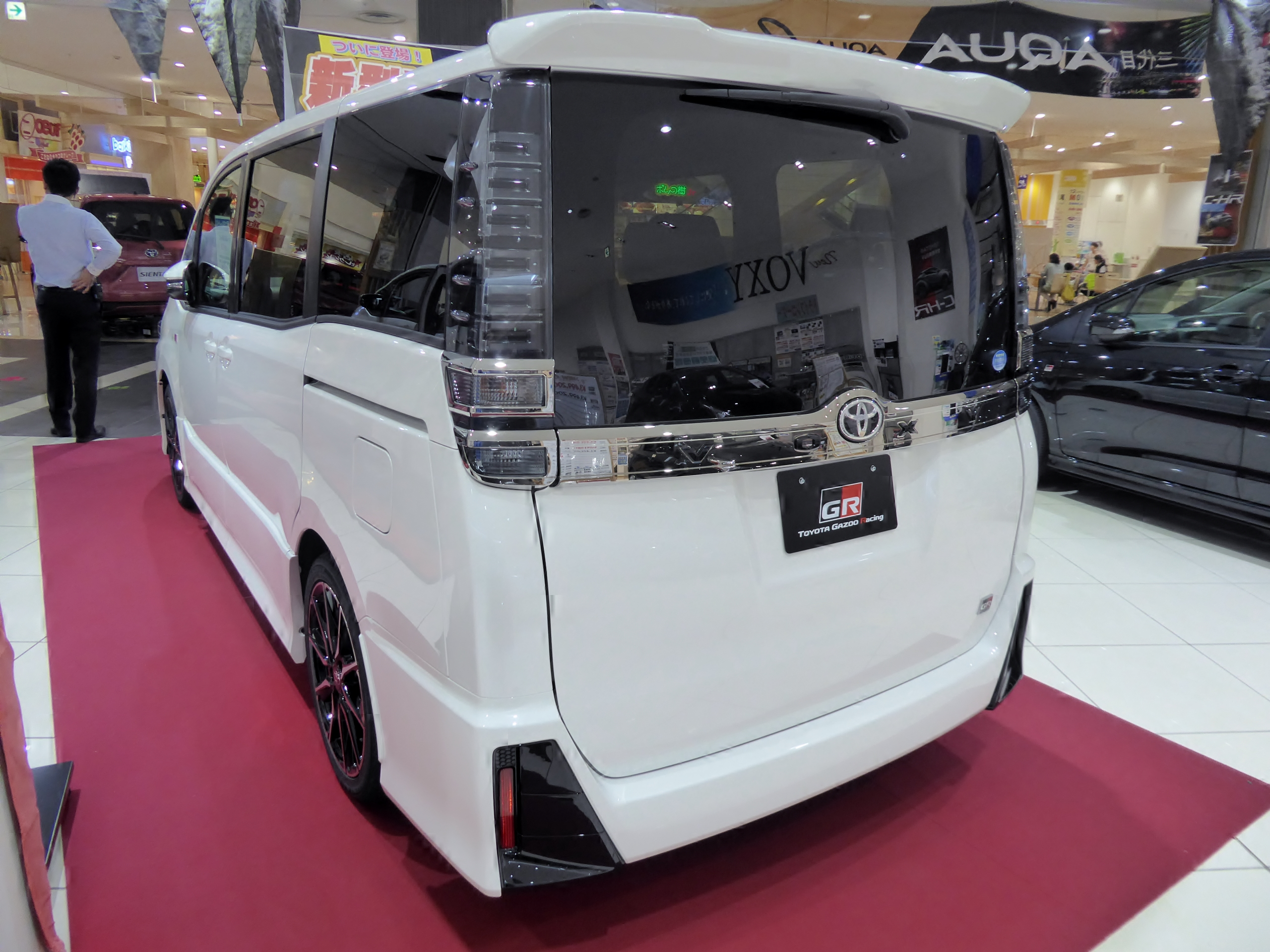
Voxy ZS GR Sport

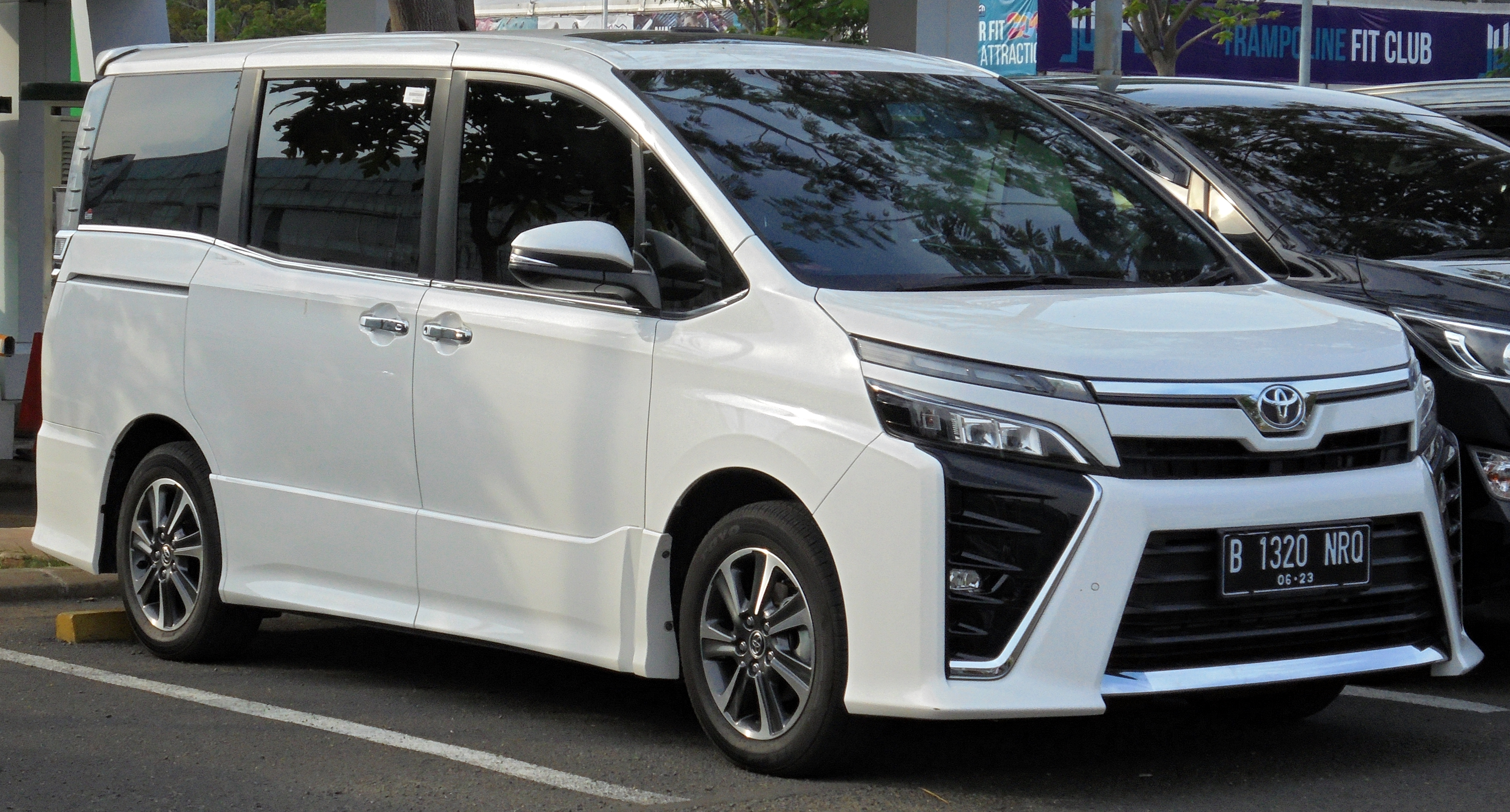
2018 Voxy (Indonesia)

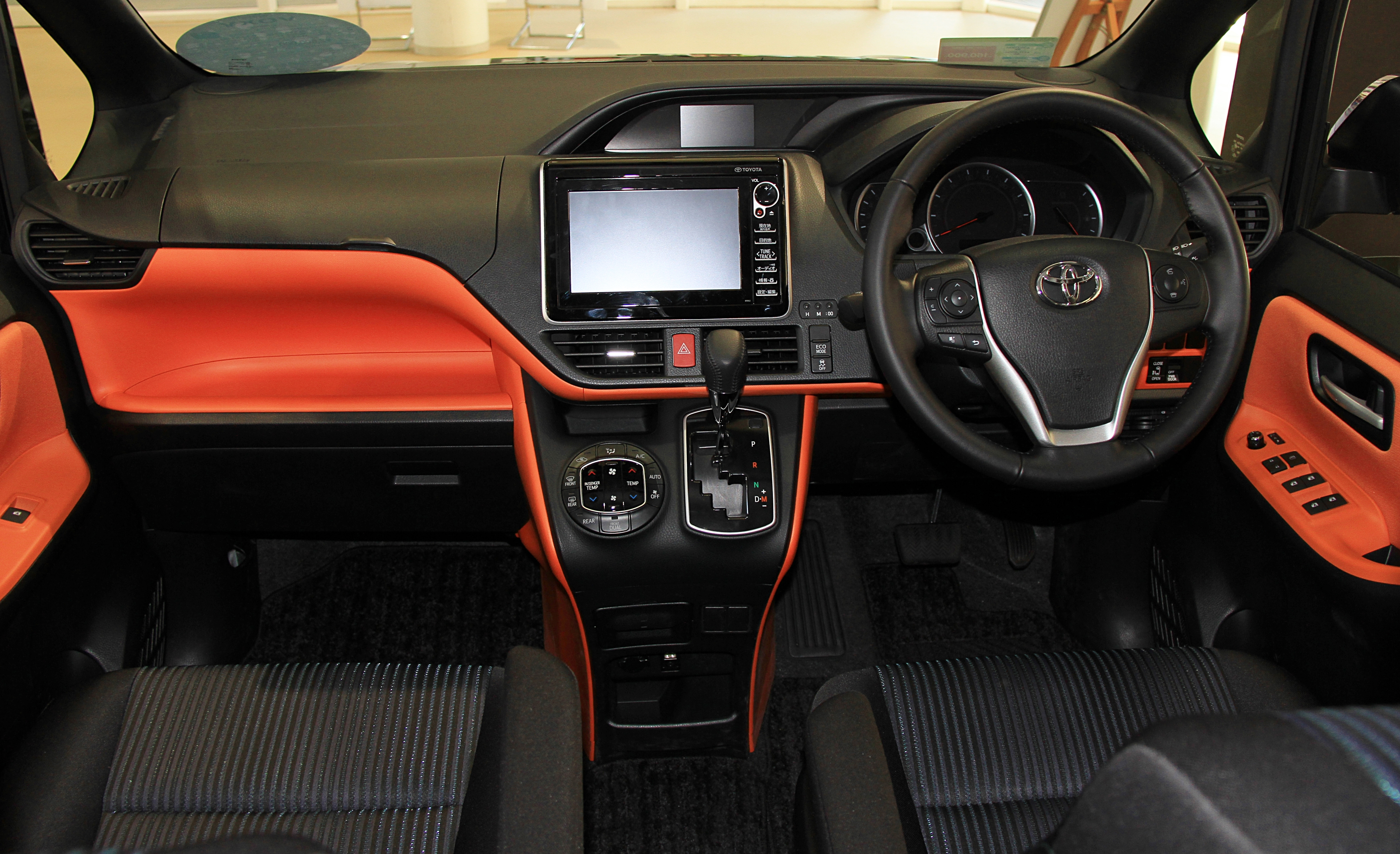
Voxy ZS interior (pre-facelift)

Esquire

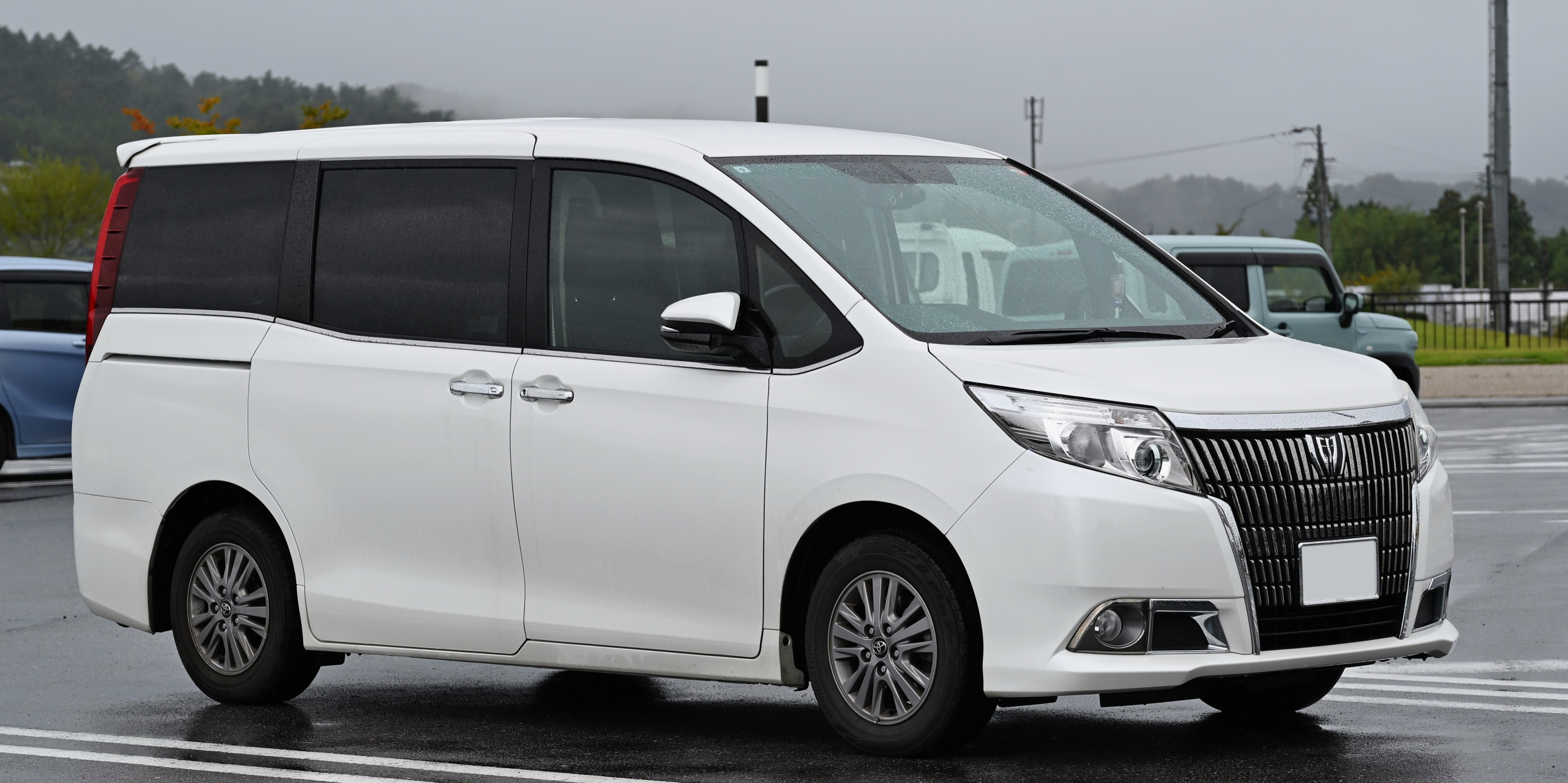
2014–2017 Toyota Esquire (pre-facelift)

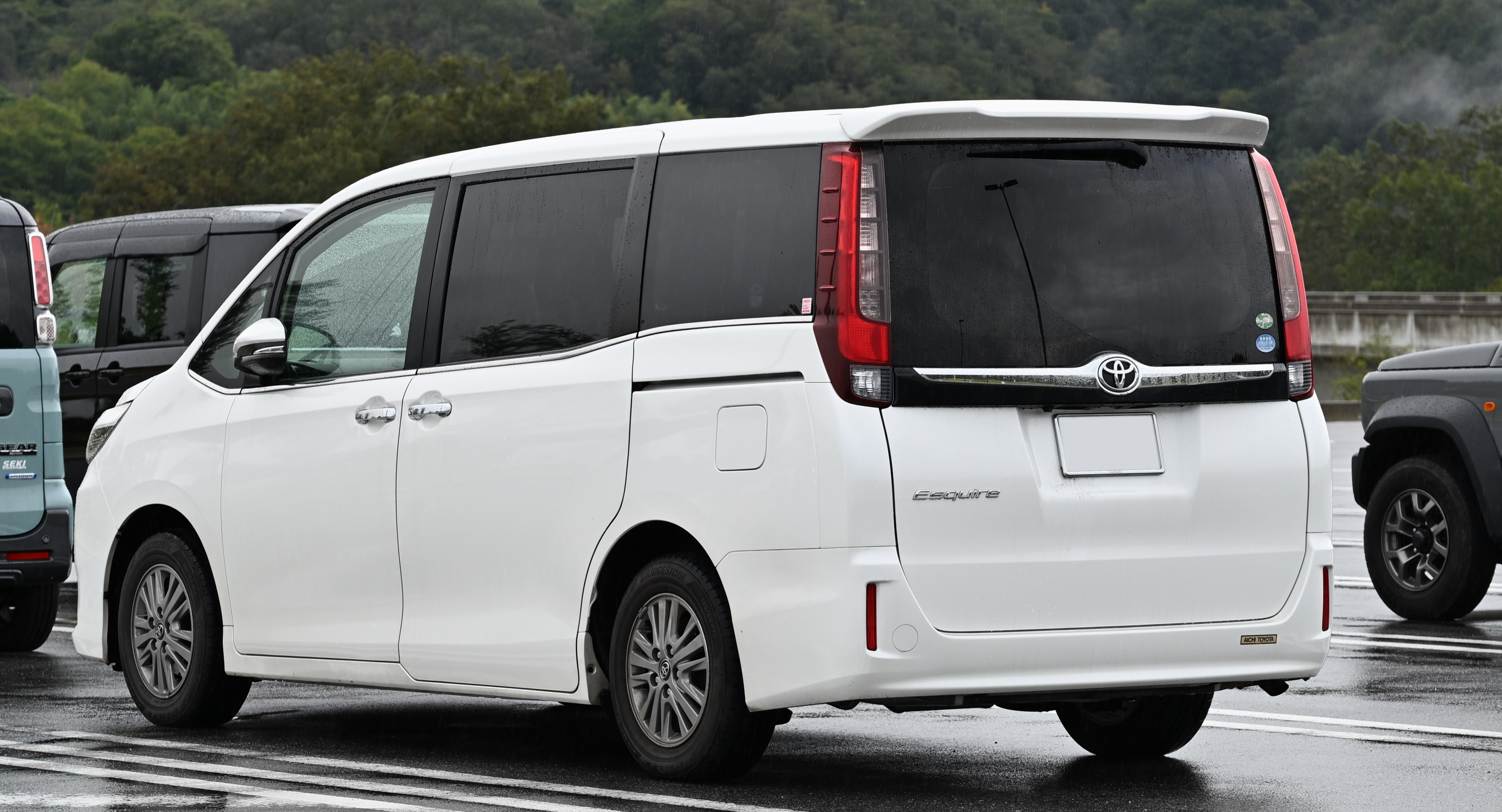
2014–2017 Esquire (pre-facelift)

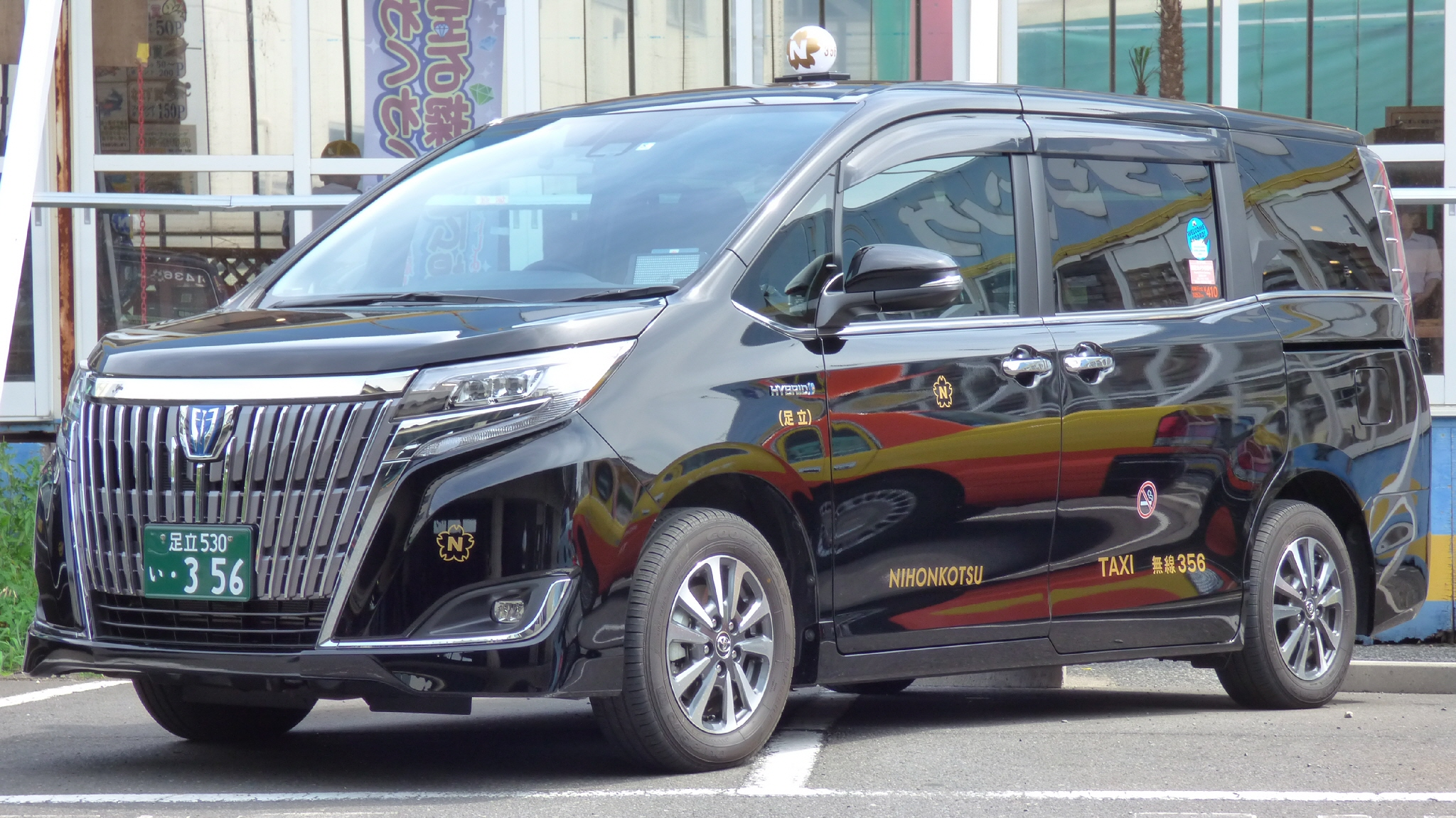
2017–2021 Esquire Hybrid (facelift) used as a taxi

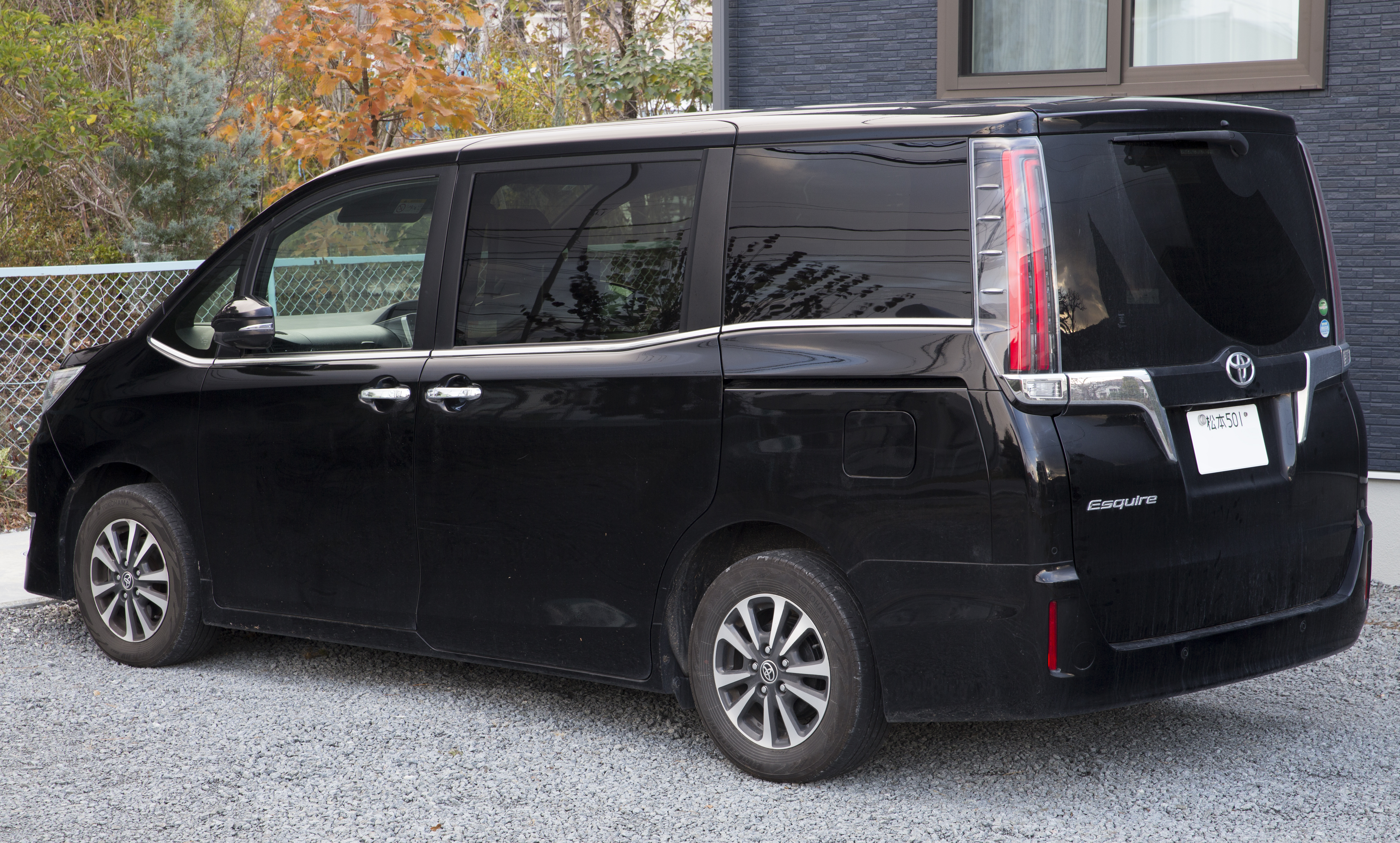
2017–2021 Esquire (facelift)

== Fourth generation (R90; 2022) ==
Fourth generation
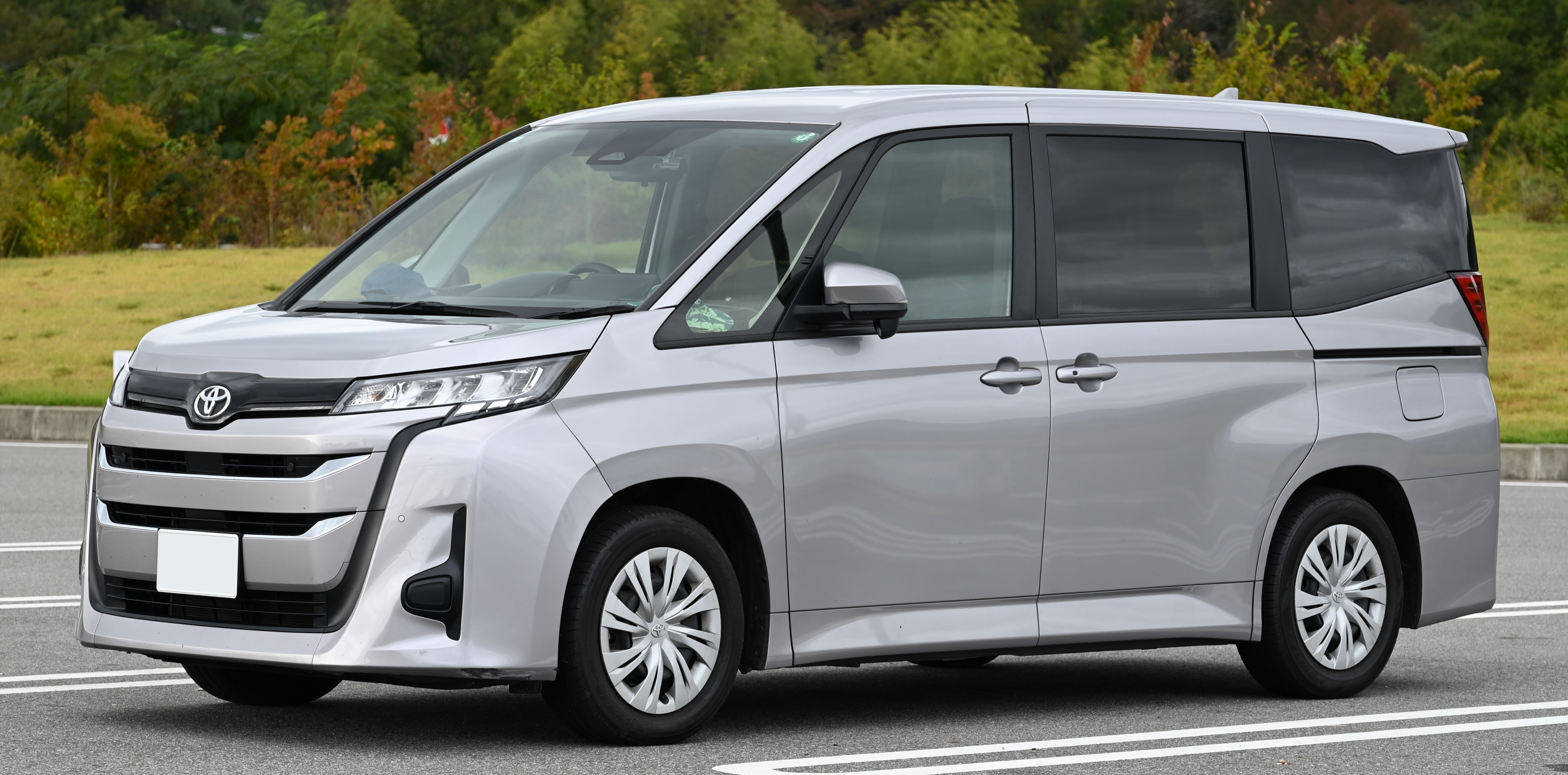
- 2022 Noah X (MZRA90W)

Overview
- Model code: R90
- Also called: Toyota Voxy; Suzuki Landy
- Production: January 2022 – present
- Assembly: Japan: Kariya, Aichi (Toyota Auto Body Fujimatsu Plant); Toyota, Aichi (Motomachi plant); Taiwan: Guanyin (Kuozui Motors, export only)
- Designer: List: Takeo Sowa (project chief designer); Tomokazu Morikawa (exterior design leader); Sho Okazaki (Noah exterior); Koichi Takeda (Voxy exterior); Shinichi Nakamura (interior design leader); Dai Noguchi (interior)

Body and chassis
- Platform: TNGA: GA-C
- Related: Toyota Innova (AG10)

Powertrain
- Engine: Petrol: 2.0 L M20A-FKS I4 (MZRA90/95); Petrol hybrid: 1.8 L 2ZR-FXE I4 (ZWR90/95)
- Electric motor: 1VM AC synchronous (front, hybrid); 1WM AC synchronous (rear, hybrid)
- Power output: 125 kW (168 hp; 170 PS) (M20A-FKS); 72 kW (97 hp; 98 PS) (2ZR-FXE, petrol engine only); 103 kW (138 hp; 140 PS) (2ZR-FXE, combined system output); 70 kW (94 hp; 95 PS) (1VM electric motor); 30 kW (40 hp; 41 PS) (1WM electric motor)
- Transmission: K120 CVT with physical first gear; eCVT (PA10) (hybrid)
- Hybrid drivetrain: Power-split (hybrid)
- Battery: 4.08 Ah lithium-ion (hybrid)

Dimensions
- Wheelbase: 2,850 mm (112.2 in)
- Length: 4,695 mm (184.8 in)
- Width: 1,730 mm (68.1 in)
- Height: 1,895–1,925 mm (74.6–75.8 in)
- Kerb weight: 1,600–1,710 kg (3,527–3,770 lb)

The fourth-generation Noah and Voxy were introduced on 13 January 2022, which are built on the GA-C platform that is revised and adapted for minivans. The Esquire nameplate was not continued in this generation.

The length and wheelbase of the fourth-generation model is unchanged from its predecessor, although the width dimension for all models is 1,730 mm (68.1 in), which is 35 mm (1.4 in) wider than the lower variant third-generation Noah. As the result, Noah/Voxy model exceeded the 1,700 mm (66.9 in) threshold of the "compact car" class under Japanese dimension regulations.

The Noah is offered in X, G, Z, S-G, and S-Z grade levels, while the Voxy is only available in S-G and S-Z grades. For the first time, the Noah no longer wears the stylized 'N' insignia on the front end, with Toyota's corporate triple oval emblem replacing it.

The Noah is also marketed by Suzuki in Japan as the fourth-generation Suzuki Landy since 8 August 2022 through an OEM agreement, replacing the previous Nissan Serena-based model.

The fourth-generation Noah and Voxy are also assembled in Guanyin, Taiwan, solely for exports to Japan with no left-hand drive vehicle production. Production commenced in early 2026, replacing the Motomachi plant that would be expected to cease production in October 2026 due to the mid-cycle facelift of the model.

=== Facelift (2026) ===
The mid-cycle facelift for the Noah and Voxy was announced on 10 April 2026 and sales commenced on 6 May 2026. The Noah features updated exterior changes, including LED C-shaped headlights and front fascia, while the Voxy also receives updated LED bar headlights. Non-hybrid grades in both models are also discontinued.

The SX variant has been added. The LCD on the instrument cluster has been enlarged from 7 inches to 12.3 inches for the SZ grade, and from 4.2 inches to 7 inches for the SG grade.

=== Markets ===
==== Indonesia ====
The fourth-generation Voxy was launched in Indonesia on 17 February 2022. Like the previous model, it is only offered in one grade with Toyota Safety Sense as standard equipment.

==== Singapore ====
The fourth-generation Noah was launched in Singapore by Borneo Motors on 4 September 2025, in the sole Hybrid Elegance variant.

==== Hong Kong ====
The fourth-generation Noah was launched in Hong Kong in April 2026, in conjunction with celebrating Crown Motors 60th anniversary. Available in sole hybrid variant.

=== Gallery ===
Noah

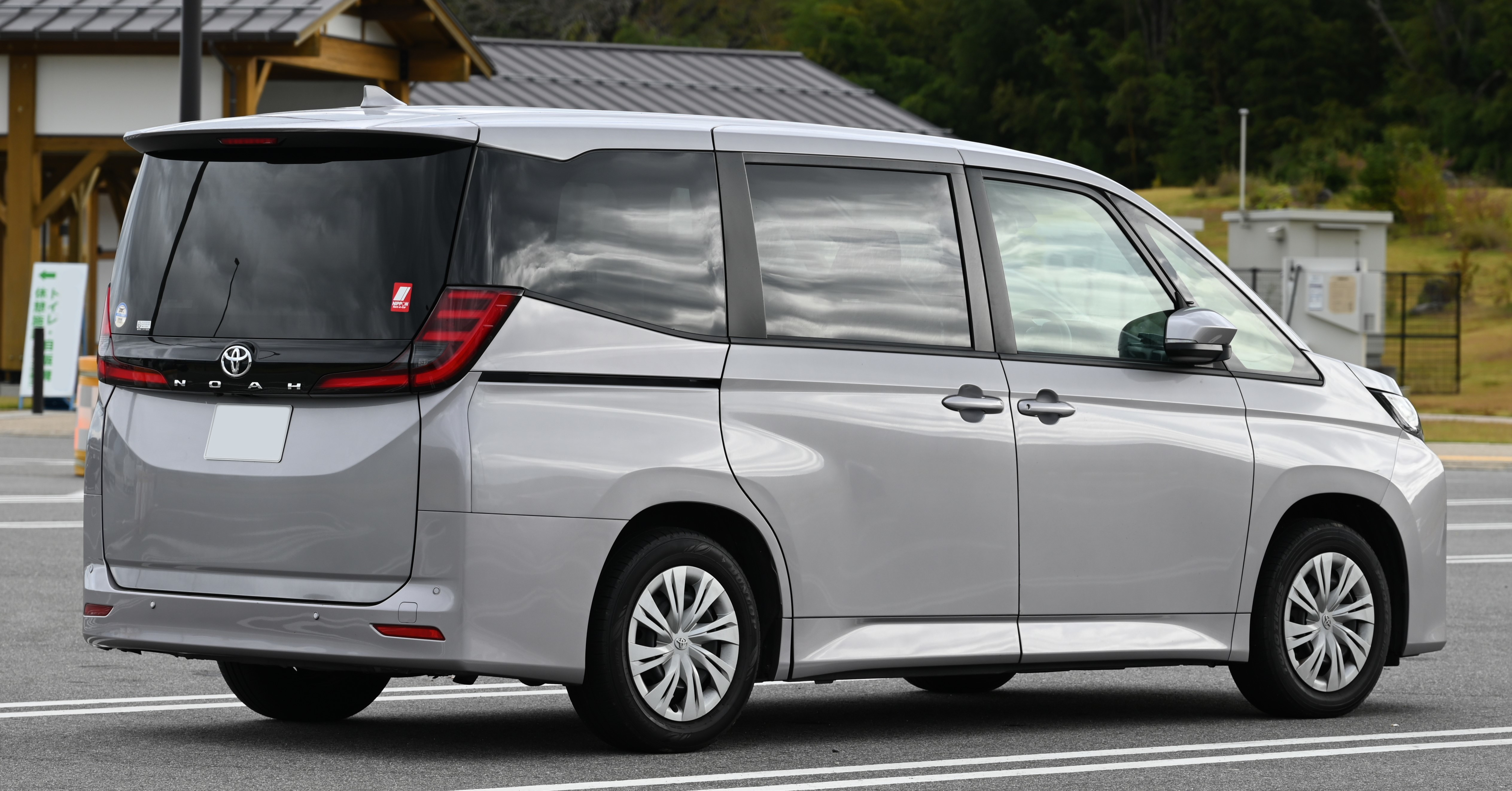
2022 Noah X (MZRA90W)

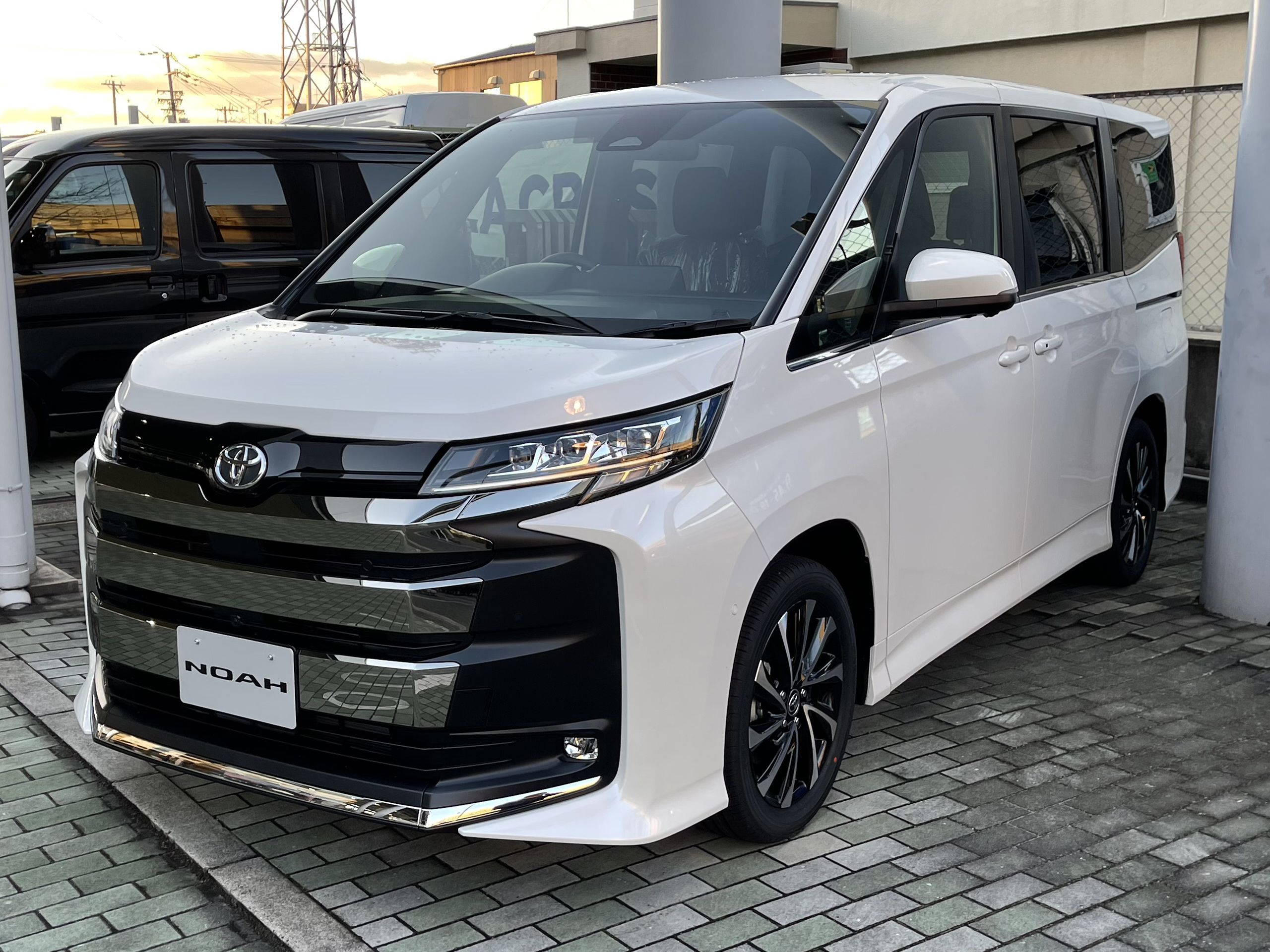
2022 Noah S-Z (MZRA90W)

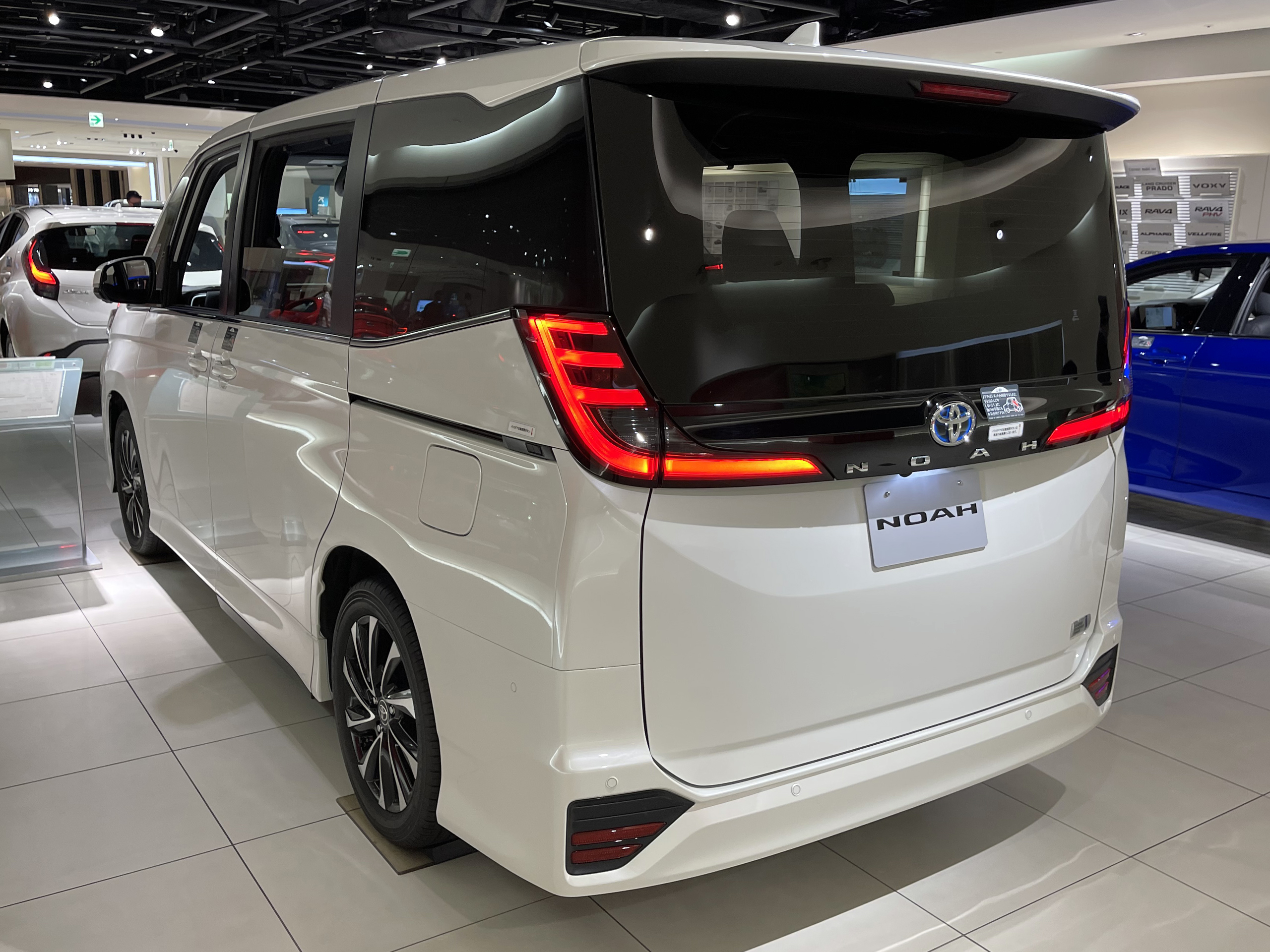
2022 Noah Hybrid S-Z (ZWR90W)

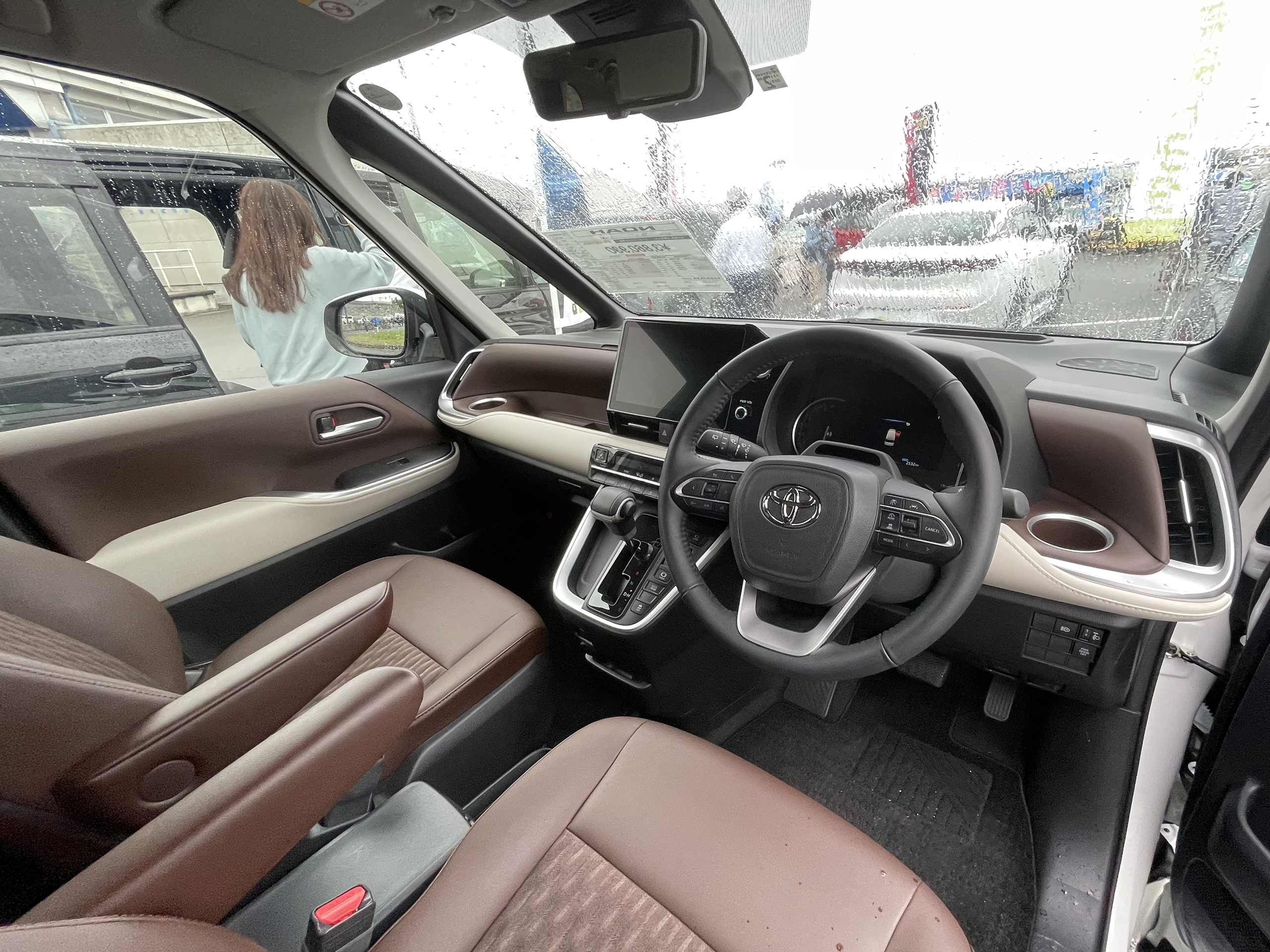
Interior

Voxy

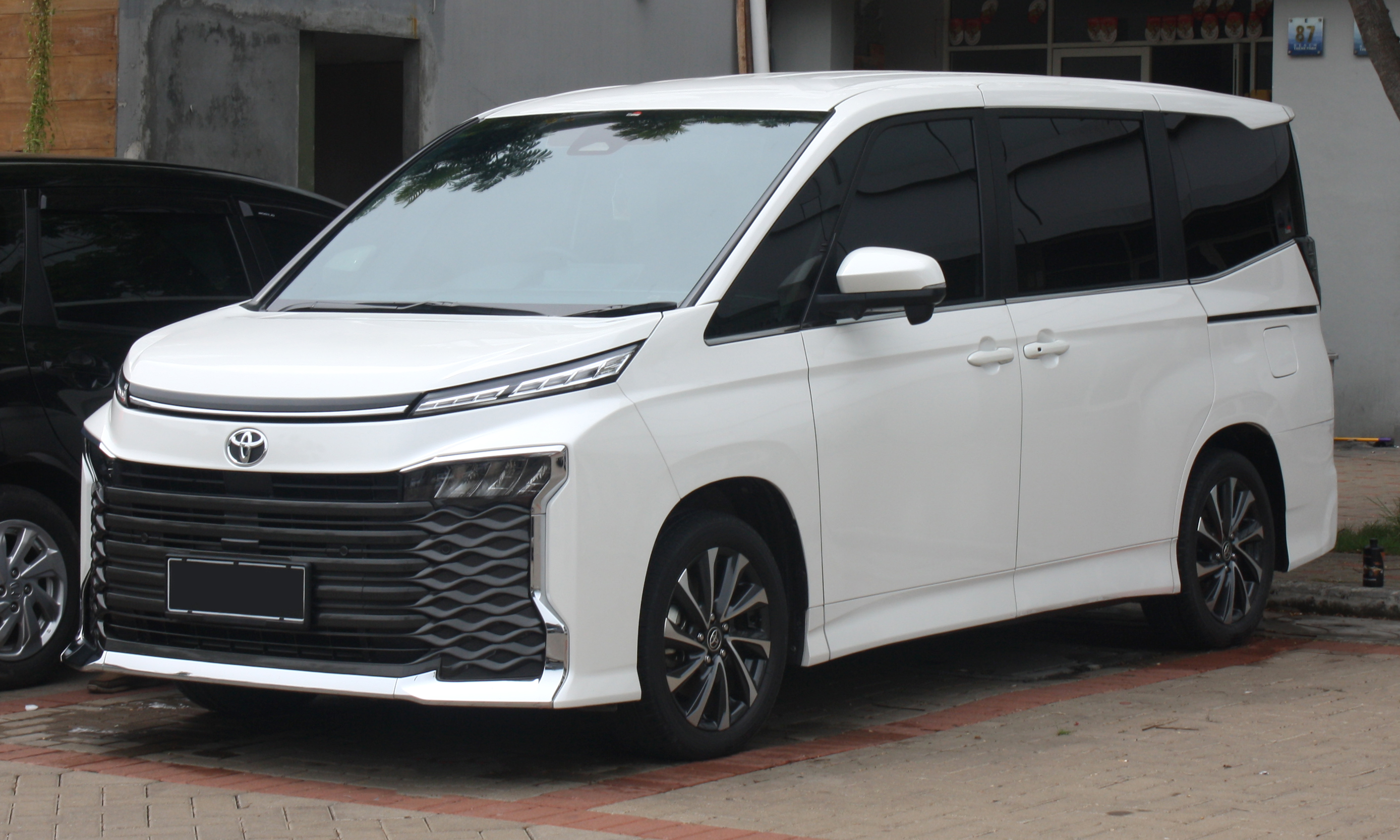
2022 Voxy (MZRA90)

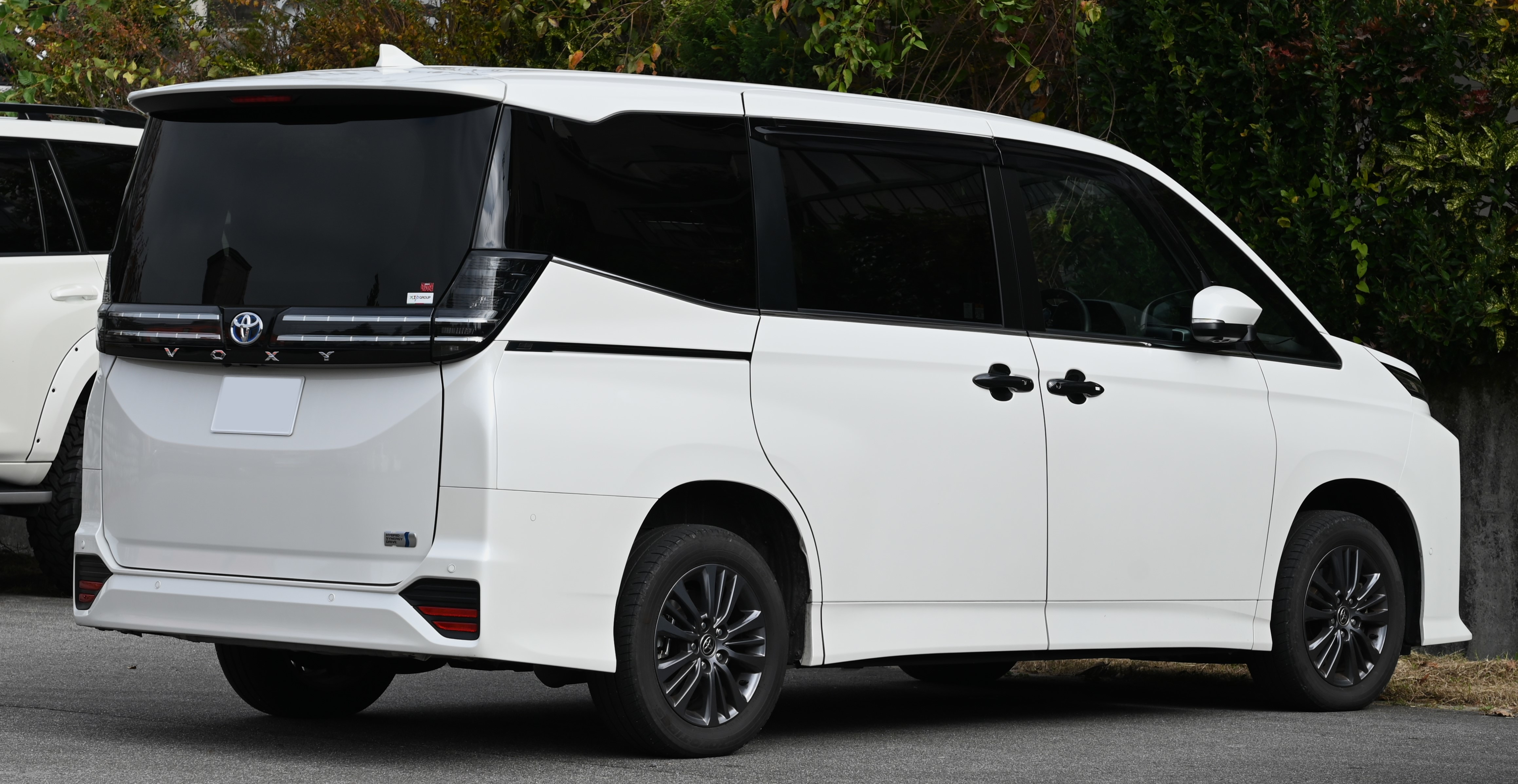
2022 Voxy Hybrid S-Z (ZWR90W)

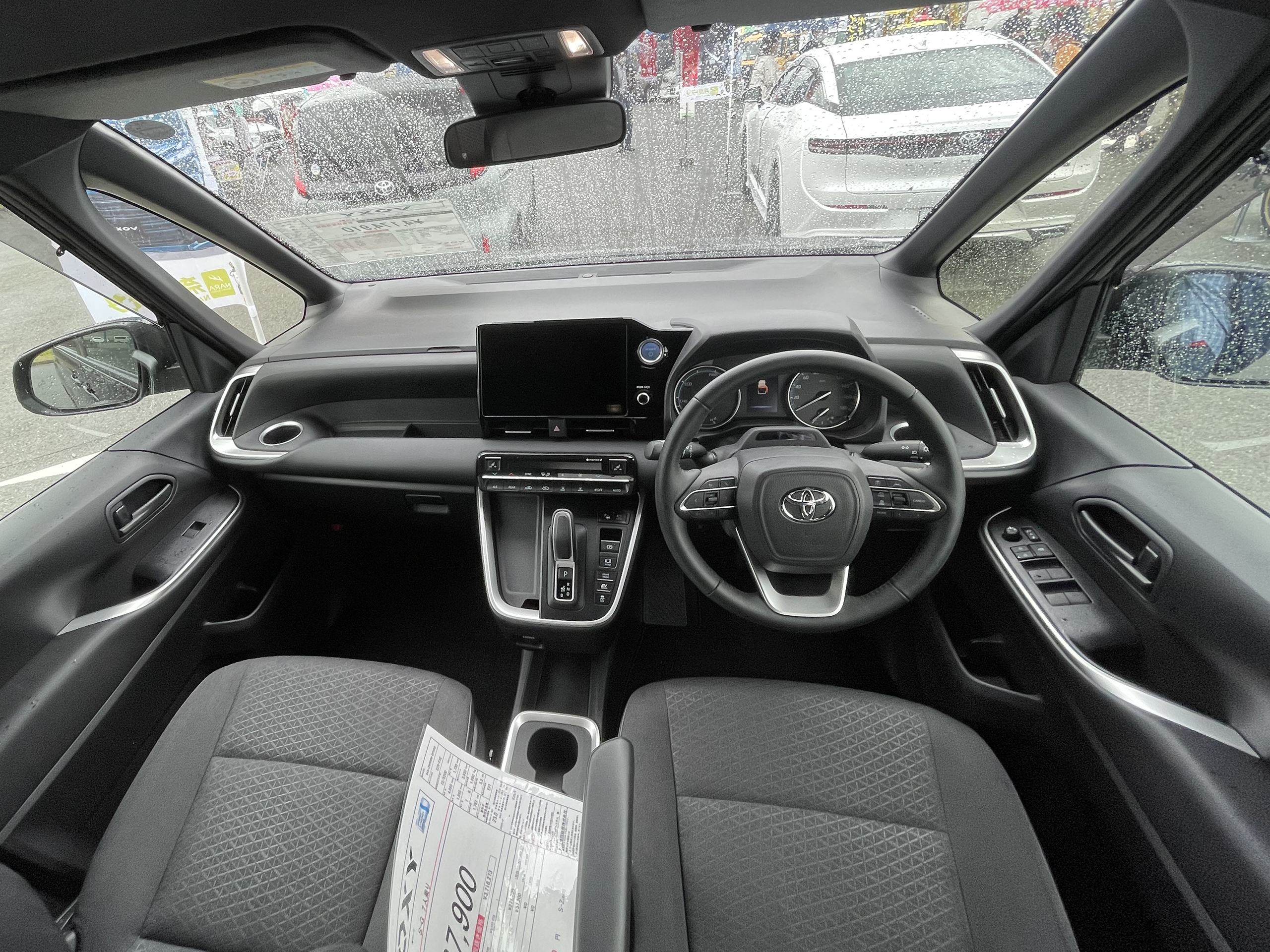
Voxy Hybrid S-G interior

Suzuki Landy

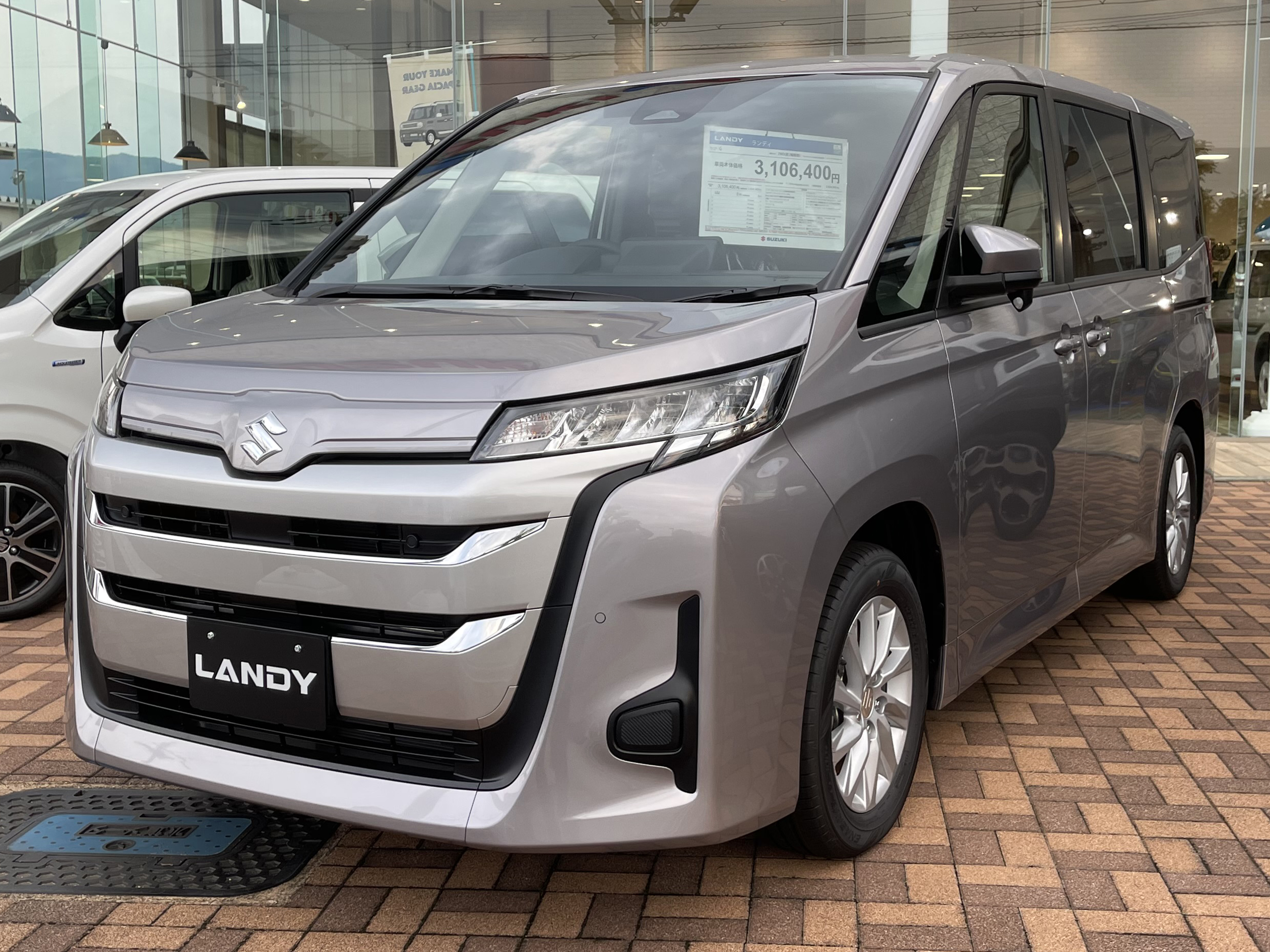
2022 Suzuki Landy G (MZRA90C)

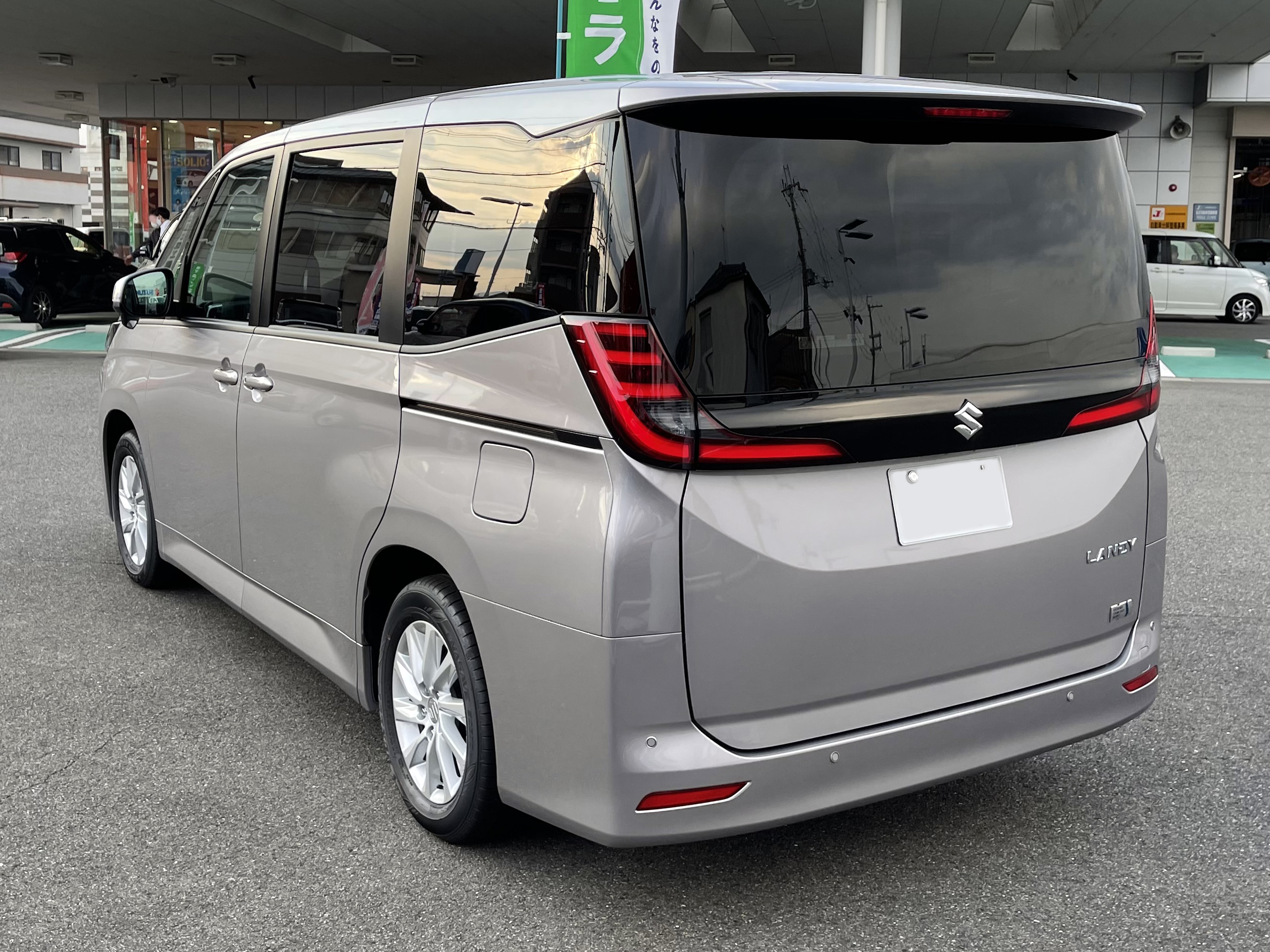
2022 Suzuki Landy Hybrid G (ZWR90C)

== Sales ==
Year	Japan			Indonesia		Malaysia (Note: Figures based on registration, includes grey imports and used car imports)		
Year	Noah	Voxy	Esquire	NAV1	Voxy	Noah	Voxy	Esquire
2002	97,080	77,958			—N/a	2		—N/a
2003	86,922	56,343			—N/a	0		—N/a
2004	77,146	62,371			—N/a	2		—N/a
2005	72,859	72,991			—N/a	0		—N/a
2006	54,283	63,546			—N/a	0		—N/a
2007	61,064	73,457			—N/a	1	2	—N/a
2008	57,477	70,165			—N/a	1	0	—N/a
2009	52,933	71,426			—N/a	0	0	—N/a
2010	56,955	72,163			—N/a	1	0	—N/a
2011	38,855	48,652			—N/a	1	2	—N/a
2012	36,764	50,539		40	—N/a	0	1	—N/a
2013	32,306	41,918		2,830	—N/a	3	1	—N/a
2014	69,605	109,174	11,028	535	—N/a	2	4	—N/a
2015	53,965	92,546	59,034	577	—N/a	10	0	—N/a
2016	54,826	91,868	44,881	501	—N/a	0	7	—N/a
2017	58,729	86,772	43,210	—N/a	977	0	4	—N/a
2018	56,719	90,759	40,224	—N/a	5,272	1	26	—N/a
2019	52,684	88,012	40,553	—N/a	3,634	8	108	—N/a
2020	45,434	69,517	26,368	—N/a	1,807	32	440	42
2021	44,211	70,085	12,482	—N/a	1,428	83	686	22
2022	57,696	55,545		—N/a	2,505	200	1,171	23
2023	95,181	89,080		—N/a	2,749	291	1,564	27
2024	70,611	70,636		—N/a	2,022	469	1,784	13
2025				—N/a	875	424	1,497	12

== See also ==
- List of Toyota vehicles
