= Toyota Corolla (E120) =

Toyota Corolla (E120/E130)
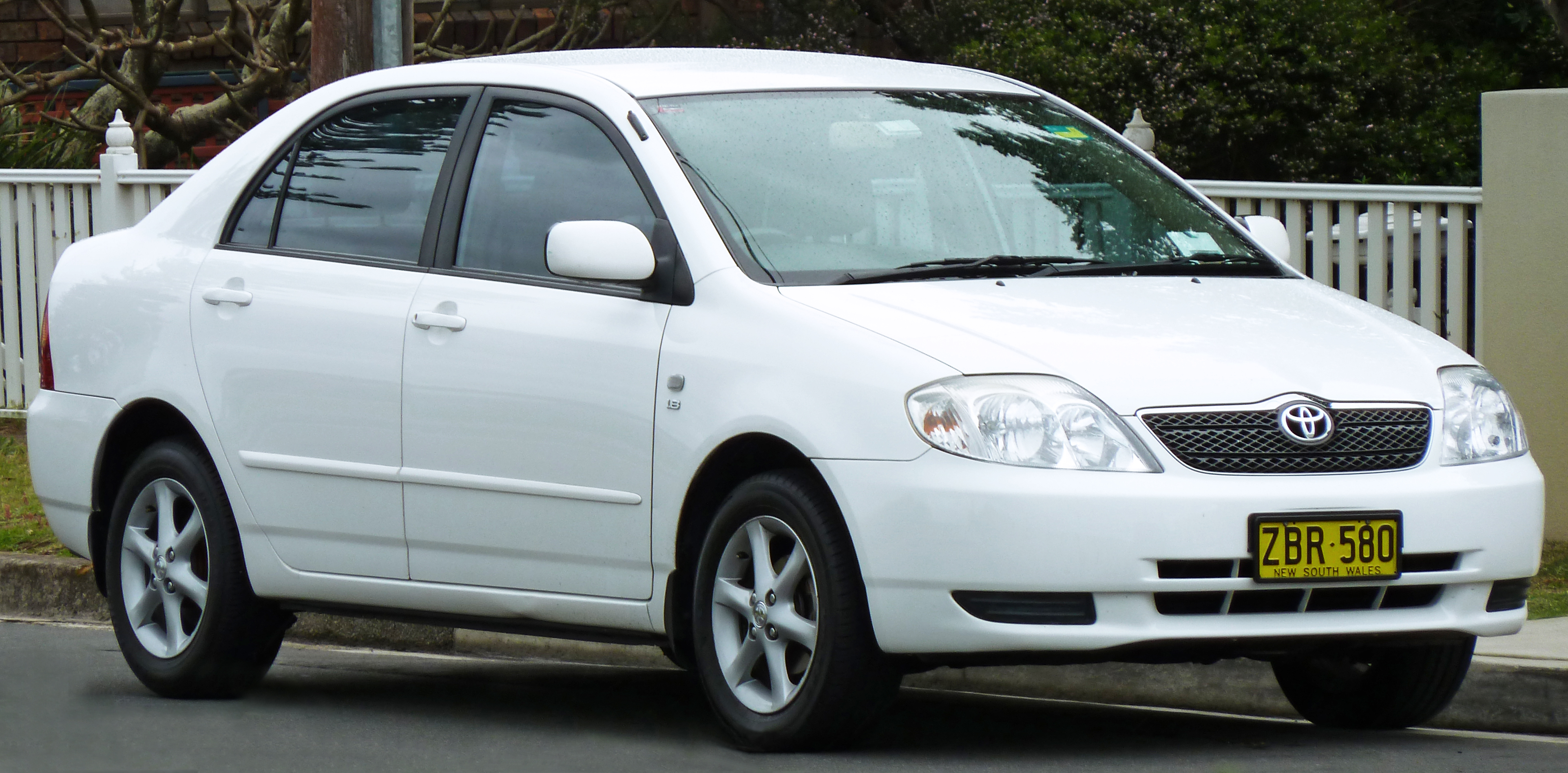
- Japanese/international version (2000–2004)

Overview
- Manufacturer: Toyota
- Also called: Toyota Allex (Japan, hatchback)
- Production: August 2000 – January 2007 (Japan); March 2001 – November 2007 (Southeast Asia); January 2002 – December 2007 (North America); February 2004 – February 2017 (China); July 2001 – January 2007 (Allex, RunX); February 2003 – September 2008 (India)
- Model years: 2003–2008
- Assembly: Japan: Toyota, Aichi (Takaoka plant); Susono, Shizuoka (Higashi Fuji plant, Corolla Fielder, after August 2005); United States: Fremont, Cal. (NUMMI); Canada: Cambridge, Ontario (TMMC); South Africa: Durban (TSAM); United Kingdom: Burnaston (TMUK); Turkey: Adapazarı (TMMT); China: Tianjin (TFTM); Taiwan: Zhongli (Kuozui Motors); Thailand: Chachoengsao (TMT); Philippines: Santa Rosa, Laguna (TMP); Malaysia: Shah Alam (ASSB); Vietnam: Vĩnh Phúc (Toyota Motor Vietnam); India: Bangalore (TKM); Pakistan: Karachi (Toyota Indus); Brazil: Indaiatuba; Colombia: Bogotá; Venezuela: Cumaná
- Designer: John McLeod (1998); Masao Saito, Takashi Hagino and Hideyuki Numata (Corolla Altis/N. American Version: 1998; MY2005 refresh: 2003)

Body and chassis
- Class: Compact car (C-segment)
- Body style: 4-door saloon/sedan; 3/5-door hatchback; 5-door estate/station wagon
- Layout: Front mid-engine, front-wheel drive or four-wheel-drive
- Platform: Toyota MC platform
- Related: Toyota Corolla Spacio (E120); Toyota Matrix (E130); Toyota Celica (T230); Pontiac Vibe

Powertrain
- Engine: Petrol: 1.3 L 2NZ-FE I4; 1.4 L 4ZZ-FE I4; 1.5 L 1NZ-FE I4; 1.6 L 4A-FE I4 (Corolla Limo, Thailand); 1.6 L 1ZR-FE I4 (China); 1.6 L 4ZR-FE I4 (China); 1.6 L 3ZZ-FE I4; 1.8 L 1ZZ-FE I4; 1.8 L 2ZZ-GE I4; 1.8 L 2ZZ-GE s/c I4 (Europe); Diesel: 1.4 L 1ND-TV D-4D turbo I4; 2.0 L 1CD-FTV D-4D turbo I4; 2.0 L 2CT turbo I4; 2.0 L 2C I4 (Asia); 2.2 L 3C-E I4 (Japan)
- Transmission: 4-speed U340E automatic (Japan); 4-speed A245E automatic; 4-speed A246E automatic (Europe); 5-speed manual; 5-speed Multimode Manual Transmission (Europe); 6-speed manual

Dimensions
- Wheelbase: 2,600 mm (102.4 in)
- Length: 2000–03 Corolla: 4,390 mm (172.8 in); 2004–07 models: 4,529 mm (178.3 in); Japanese models: 4,370 mm (172.0 in); Hatchback: 4,180 mm (164.6 in)
- Width: 2000–03 Corolla: 1,695 mm (66.73 in); 2004–07 models: 1,705 mm (67.13 in)
- Height: 2003–04 Base: 1,460–1,466 mm (57.5–57.7 in); 2005–08 CE: 1,481 mm (58.3 in); 2005–08 S & LE: 1,486 mm (58.5 in); XRS: 1,476 mm (58.1 in)
- Curb weight: Japanese specifications: 1,070–1,190 kg (2,358.9–2,623.5 lb) (hatchback); 1,010–1,180 kg (2,226.7–2,601.5 lb) (sedan); 1,070–1,240 kg (2,358.9–2,733.7 lb) (station wagon); 5-door hatchback (Europe) with 1ND-TV: 1,280–1,330 kg (2,821.9–2,932.1 lb)

Chronology
- Predecessor: Toyota Corolla (E110)
- Successor: Toyota Corolla (E140/E150) – sedan, wagon; Toyota Auris (E150) – hatchback

The Toyota Corolla (E120/E130) is the ninth generation of compact cars sold by Toyota under the Corolla nameplate. In Japan, this series arrived to the market in August 2000; however, exports were typically not achieved until 2001 and 2002 depending on the market.

The sedan and station wagon arrived first in August 2000, followed by the five-door hatchback in January 2001, and the Europe-only three-door hatchback in 2002. Toyota supplemented the original styling with an edgier, hatchback-only styling treatment from 2002. Sedans and wagons sold in Japan adopted a new front-end design in 2004, although this version did not typically reach European markets. In other Asian markets and the Americas, the ninth generation Corolla (sedan and wagon only) had unique front and rear styling treatments with mild updates over the model's production run.

The E120/E130 model offered a longer 2,600 mm (102.4 in) wheelbase. It is built on a shortened V50 series Vista platform. From being marketed as a premium compact sedan, to an affordable hatchback, the ninth generation Corolla was designed as a "global" automobile to suit different market needs. This was one of Toyota's most versatile and most popular models ever produced.

The E120/E130 series Corolla has also spawned another separate hatchback model called the Matrix, sold in the United States, Canada and Mexico, which forms the basis of the Pontiac Vibe, which was in turn sold in Japan as the Voltz.

The E120 series was replaced by the E140 or E150 series in late 2006 or early 2007 but the E120 continued to be produced in China until 2017.

The E120 Corolla won the What Car? magazine's "Car of the Year" award for 2002.

== Japanese/international version ==
=== Japan ===
For the Japanese market, trim levels for the Corolla Sedan were X Assista Package (Base), X, G and Luxel. The Corolla has several different engines include: The base models were powered by a 1300 2NZ-FE engine, the mid-models were powered by 1500 1NZ-FE engine, and top variant were powered by 1800 1ZZ-FE and engine. The 2ZZ-FE only available in wagon and RunX. All diesel models sedan are powered by a 2200 cc 3C-E engine.

The station wagon model is called the Corolla Fielder, trim levels for the Corolla Fielder were X, X G Edition, and Z Aero Tourer. Booth sedan and wagon were released on 28 August 2000, it was available in Front-wheel drive and All-wheel drive. The Welcab is optional for both sedan and wagon models.

In Japan and the five-door hatchback is called the Corolla RunX, launched in December 2001. The Toyota Allex is a five-door hatchback that replaced the Sprinter sedan, a badge engineered version of the Corolla RunX. The Allex was exclusive to Toyota Netz Store locations, while the Corolla RunX was exclusive to Toyota Corolla Store locations.

The first two of three Japanese Allex trim levels were not differentiated with a visual badge, but offered similar packages to the RunX with the base model featuring the 1500 cc 1NZ-FE engine, the middle range featuring the 1800 cc 1ZZ-FE engine and the Allex RS180 featuring the 1800 cc 2ZZ-GE engine.

The Allex models offered a different colour range and had minor styling differences to the RunX, such examples include the plastic trim above the license plate area being chrome as opposed to body colour like on the RunX. Interior cloth patterns also differed from the RunX.

The Corolla Spacio (Verso in Europe) moved on to the new platform, with later models adding a third row of fold-down seating in the back. The Corolla sedan sold in Japan also differed slightly as compared to the other markets with a slightly different headlamp and tail lamp design.

On 27 April 2004, all Japanese market Corollas received a facelift. The sedan features a redesigned headlights and taillights.

Corolla

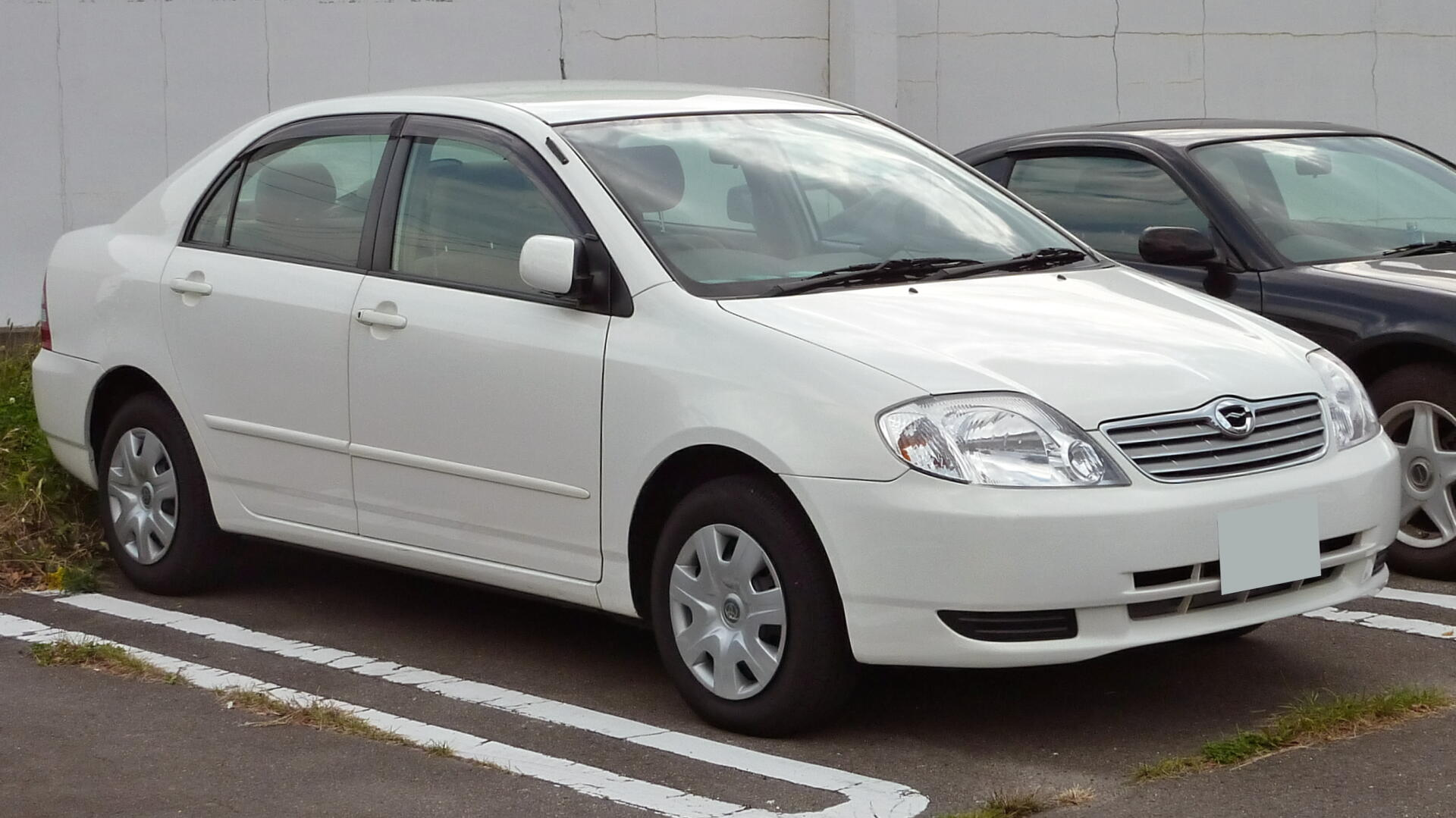
Toyota Corolla sedan (first facelift, Japan)

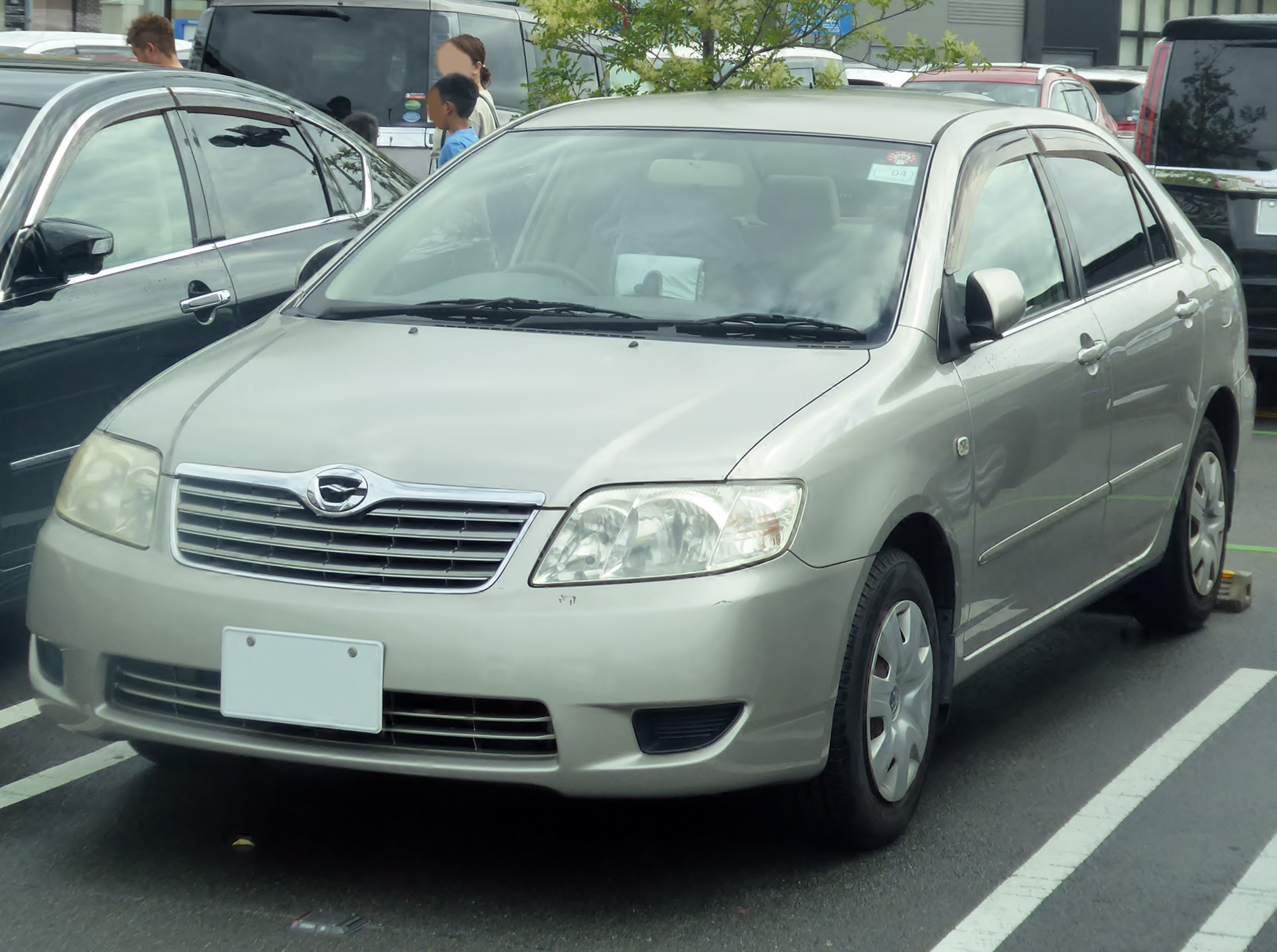
Toyota Corolla sedan (second facelift, Japan)

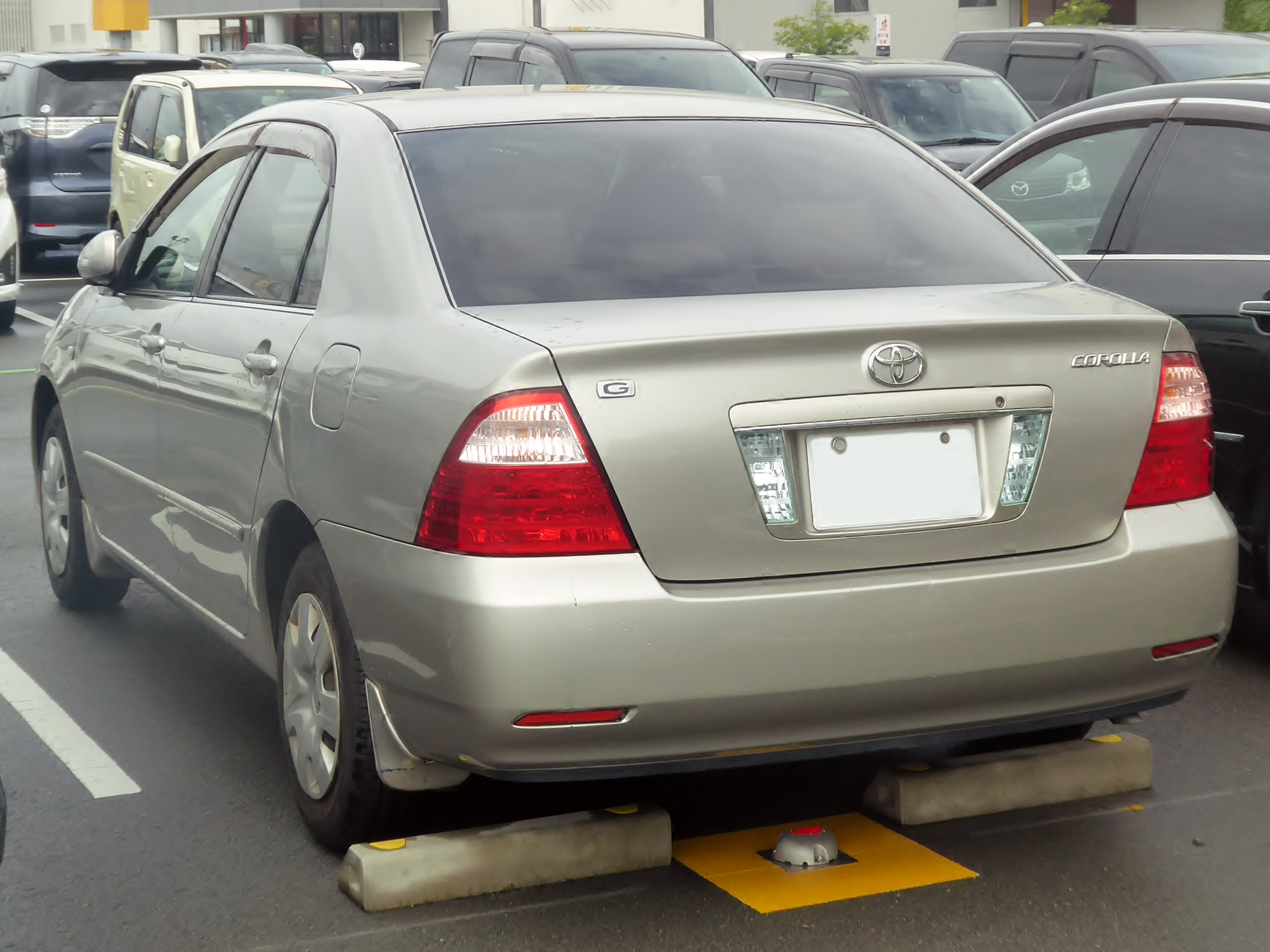
Rear view (second facelift)

Corolla Fielder

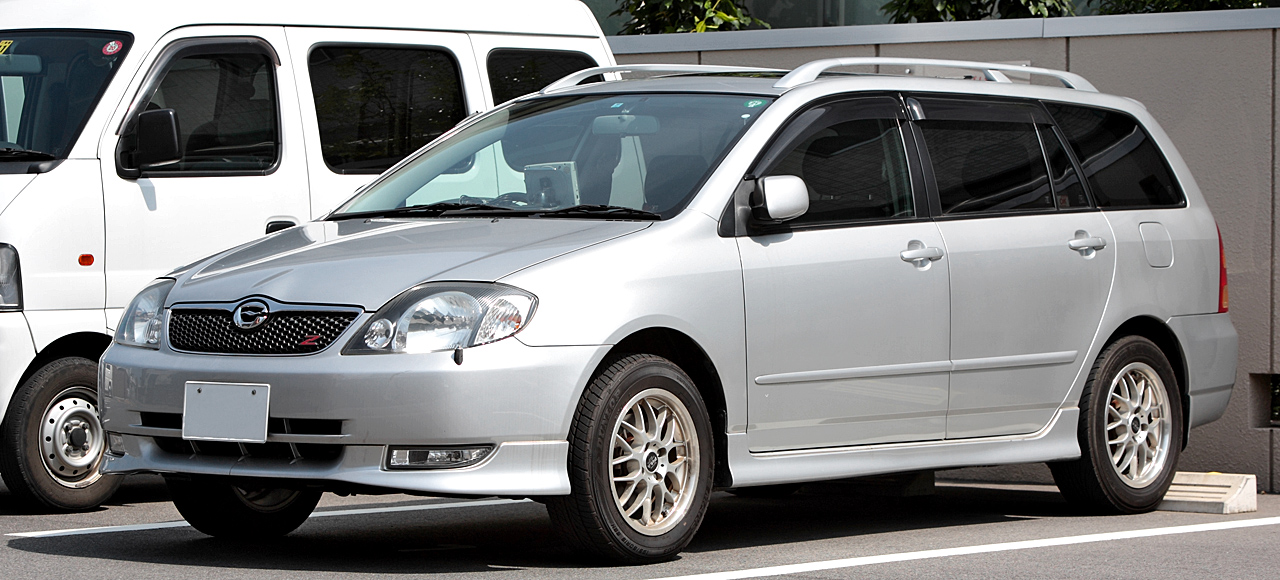
2000–2004 Toyota Corolla Fielder

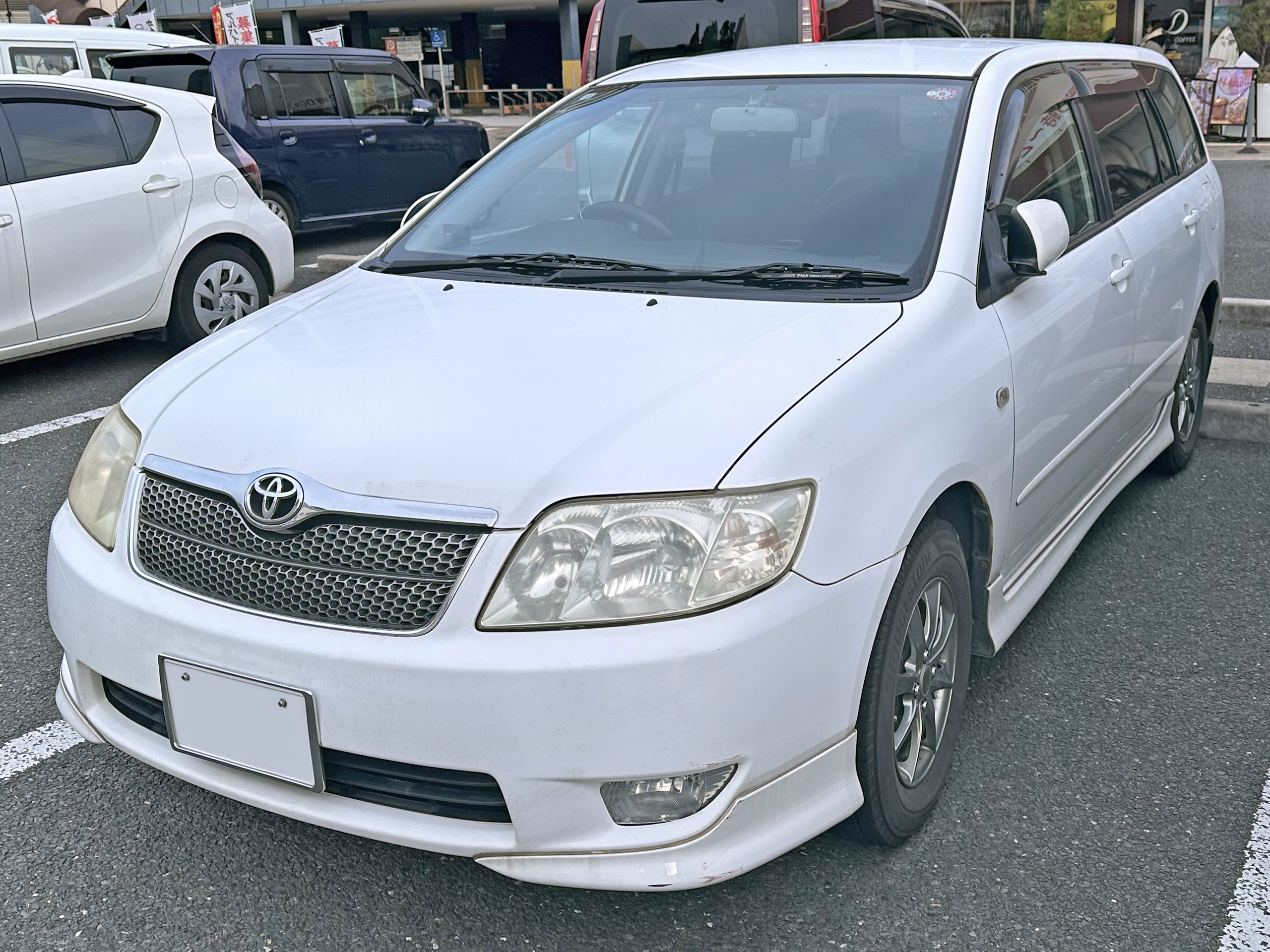
Toyota Corolla Fielder (second facelift)

Corolla RunX/Allex

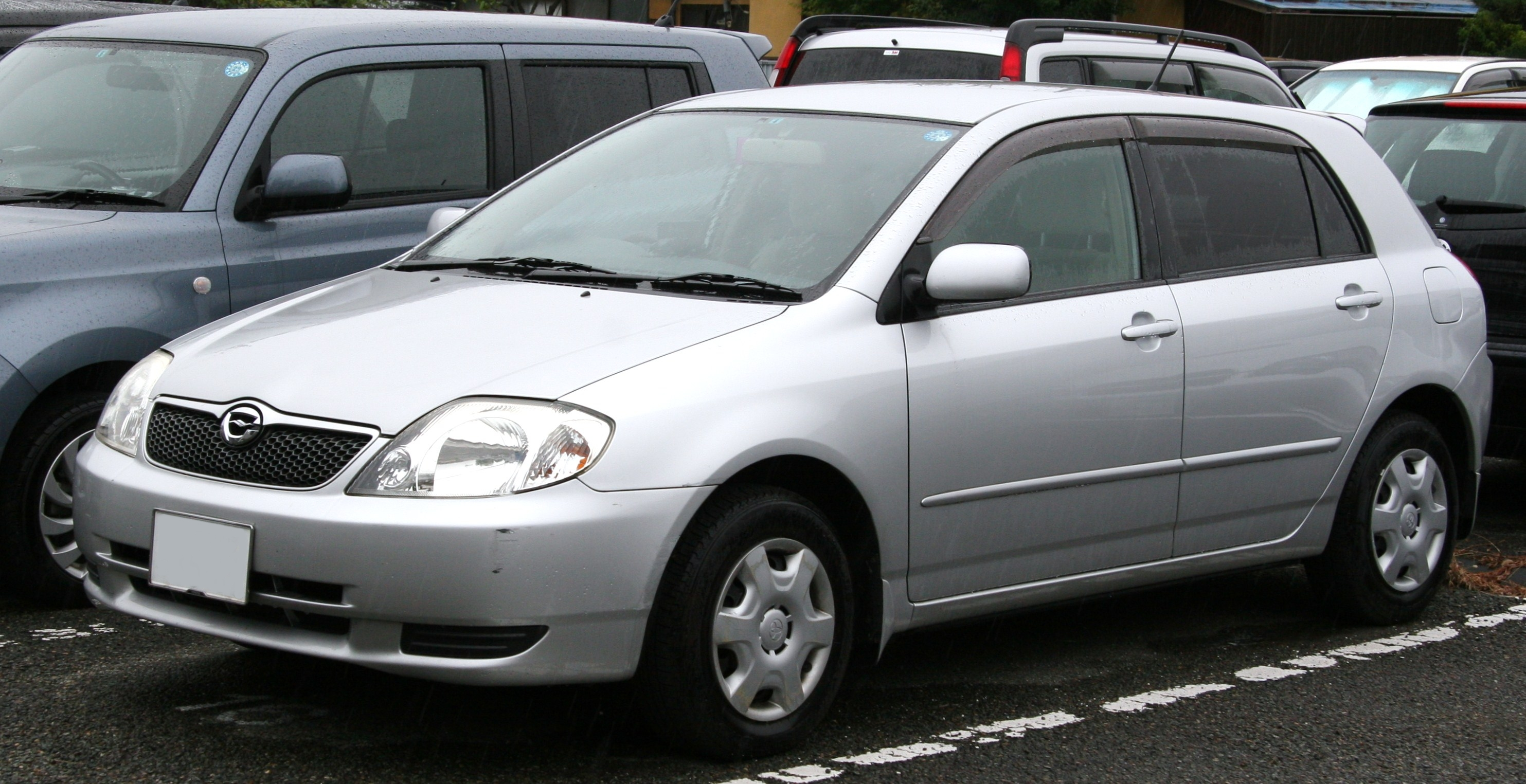
Pre-facelift Toyota Corolla RunX

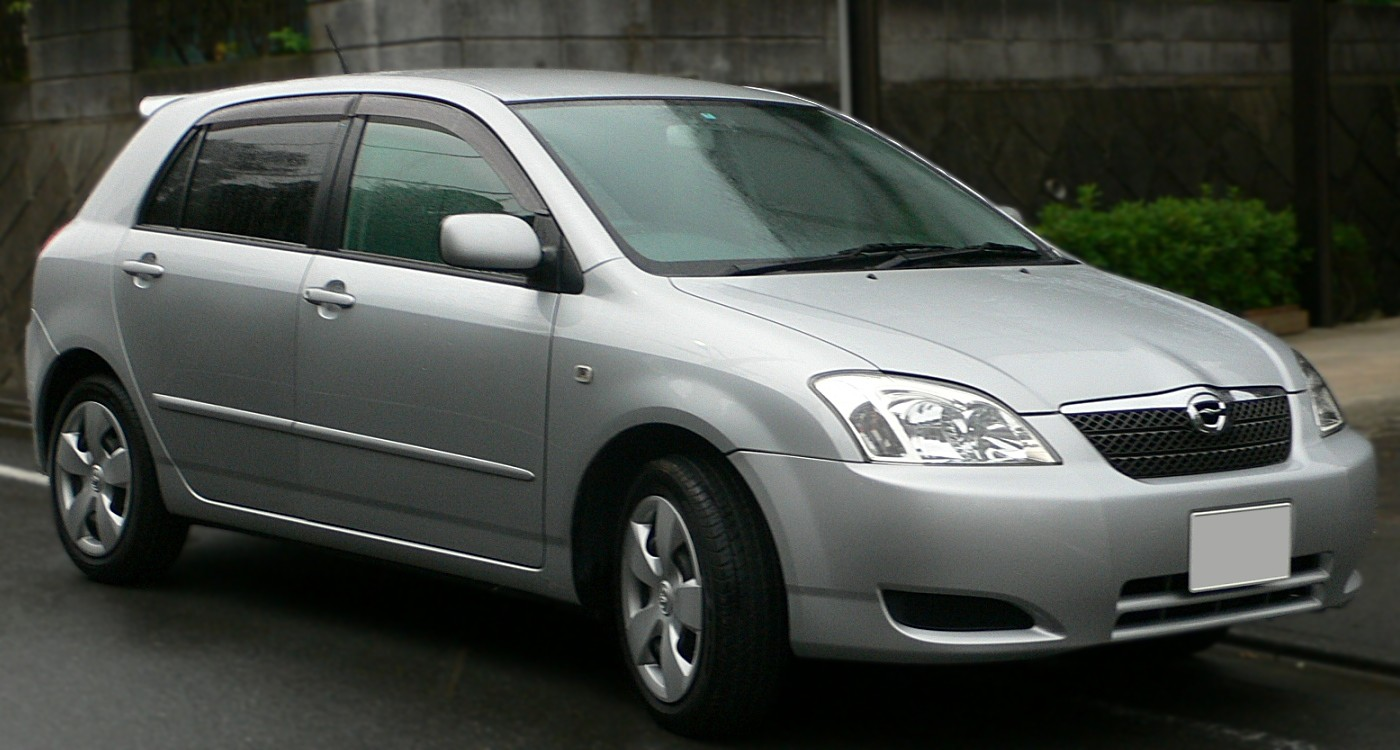
2002 Toyota Corolla Runx (first facelift, Japan)

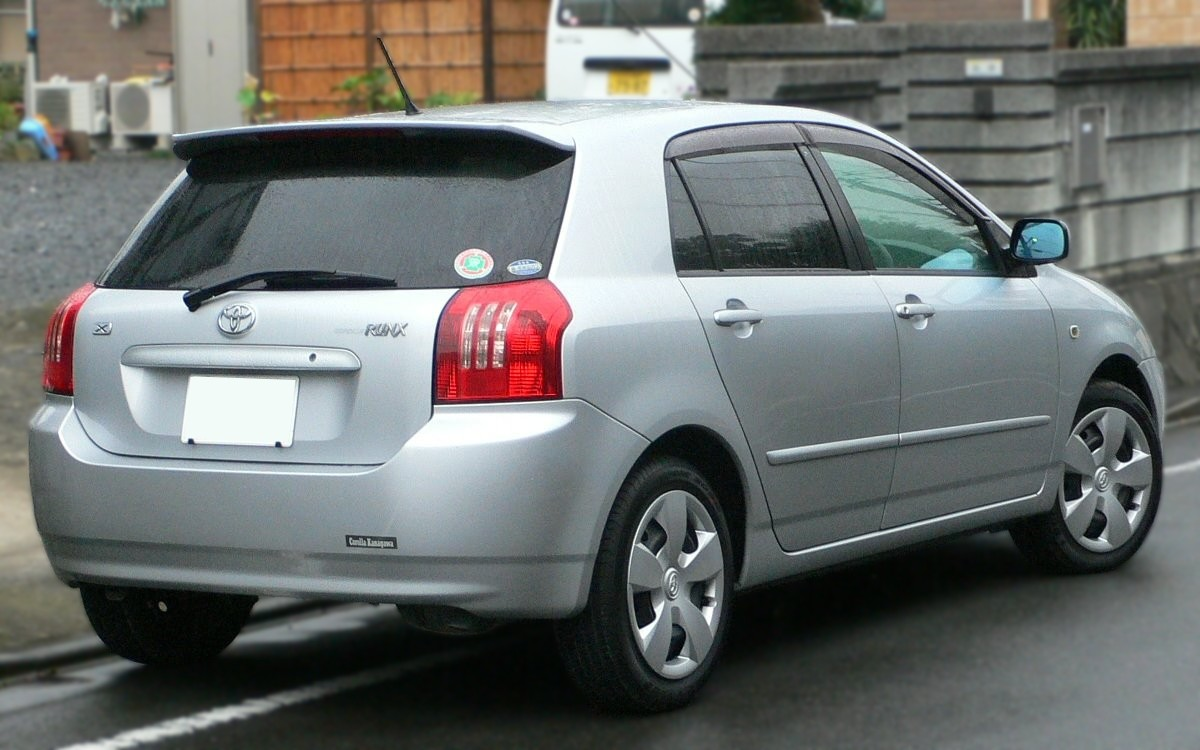
Corolla Runx Rear view

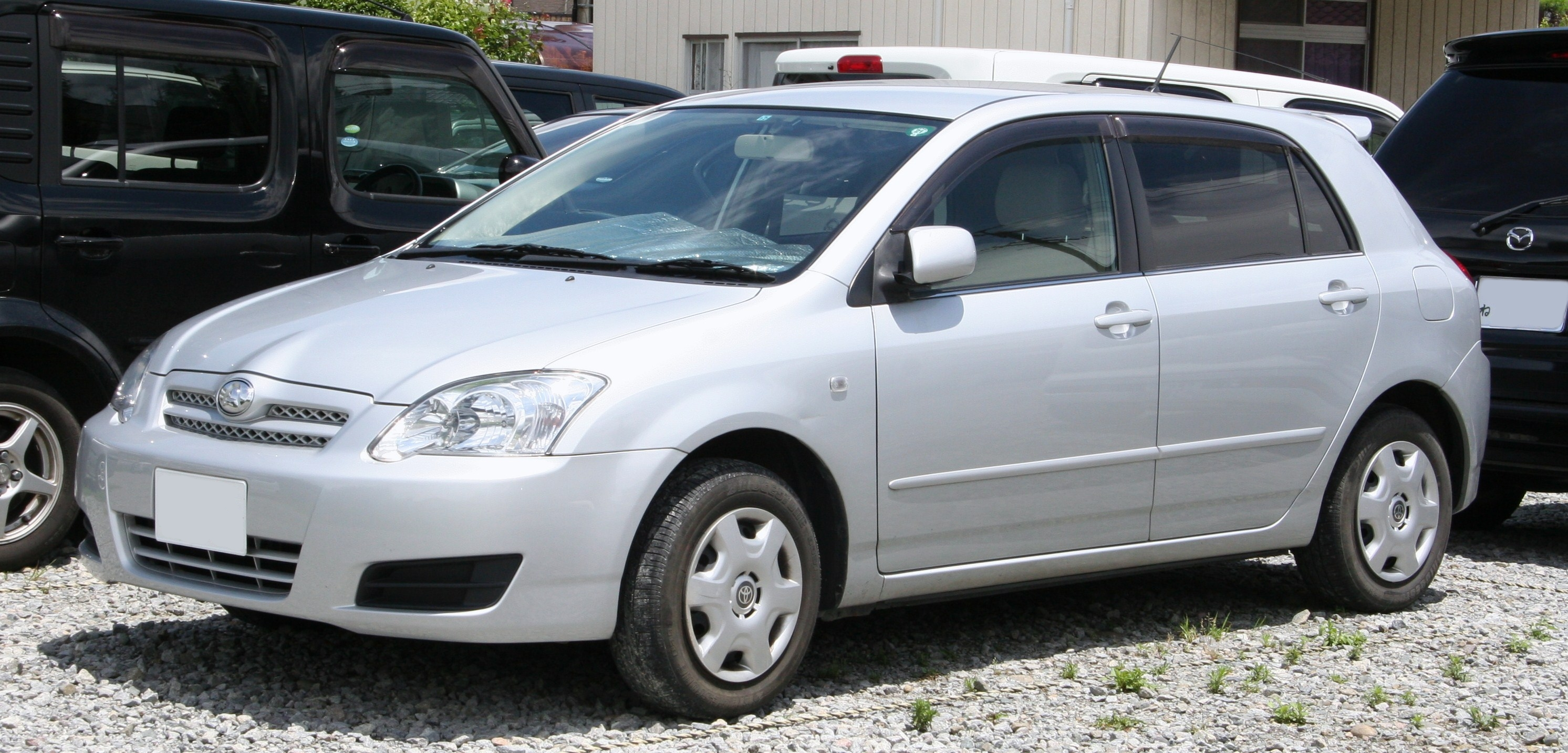
2004–2006 Toyota Allex (Japan)

=== Australia and New Zealand ===
The E120 Corolla sold in Australia was available as a sedan, wagon and five-door hatchback (Seca), sales began in December 2001. Trim levels offered were the Ascent, Ascent Sport, Conquest, Levin and Ultima. A small number of models were built in South Africa, with the high-performance Sportivo (hatchback only) built exclusively in South Africa. South African-built Corollas have a vehicle identification number starting with A; Japanese-made examples have a VIN starting with J. The Sportivo was powered by the 2ZZ-GE engine and a six-speed manual gearbox, while the other models had the 1ZZ-FE. Minor changes in 2004 included the grille and replacing the headlights with a "tear drop" type. The Sportivo was discontinued in Australia from 2006 due to the prohibitive costs involved in modifying the engine to comply with Euro IV emissions.

All the other models had their engine power and torque reduced with October 2005 production from 100 to 93 kW (134 to 125 hp) and from 171 to 161 N⋅m (126 to 119 lb⋅ft) to comply with Euro IV. From May 2006, the Ascent and Ascent Sport models were upgraded with standard front power windows and passenger airbag, while the Conquest models had ABS as standard. The equipment upgrades were not applied to the wagon, which ceased production in August 2006.

In New Zealand, the Corolla hatch was offered in three trim levels: GL, GLX & T Sport. The GL proved most popular and differed from the GLX only by a lack of woodgrain trim, rear electric windows, passenger airbag and alloy wheels. GLX models mostly featured tan coloured interior with woodgrain trim, front fog lights and alloy wheels as standard. The T Sport model offered a sportier look with spoiler, side skirts, front fog lights and 15-inch alloy wheels as standard. All models had the 1.8-litre 1ZZ-FE, offered either a four-speed automatic or five-speed manual and had manual A/C as standard. The Corolla sedan was offered only in the GL and GLX trim level, whilst the station wagon offered in the GL trim only.

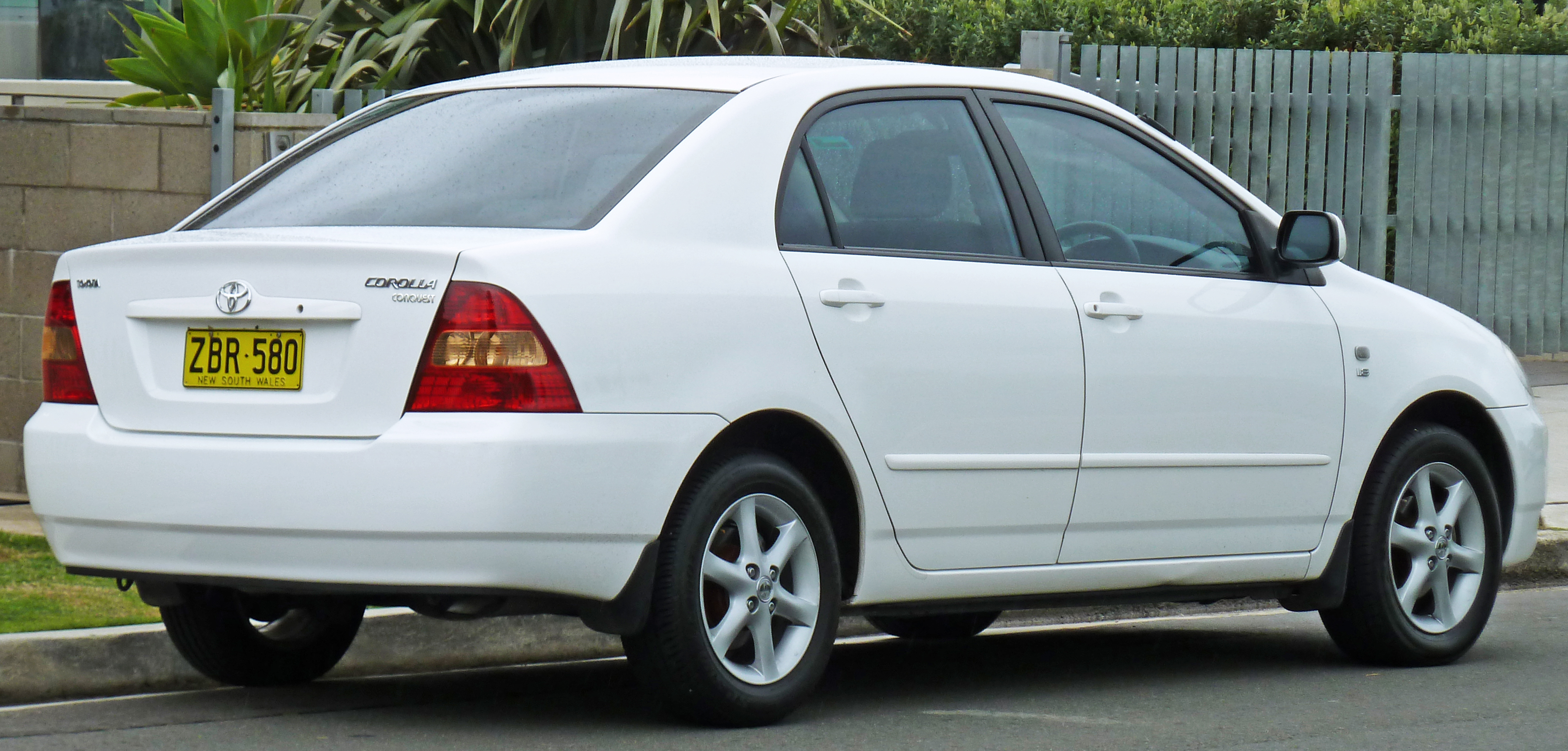
2003–2004 Corolla Conquest sedan (ZZE122; Australia)

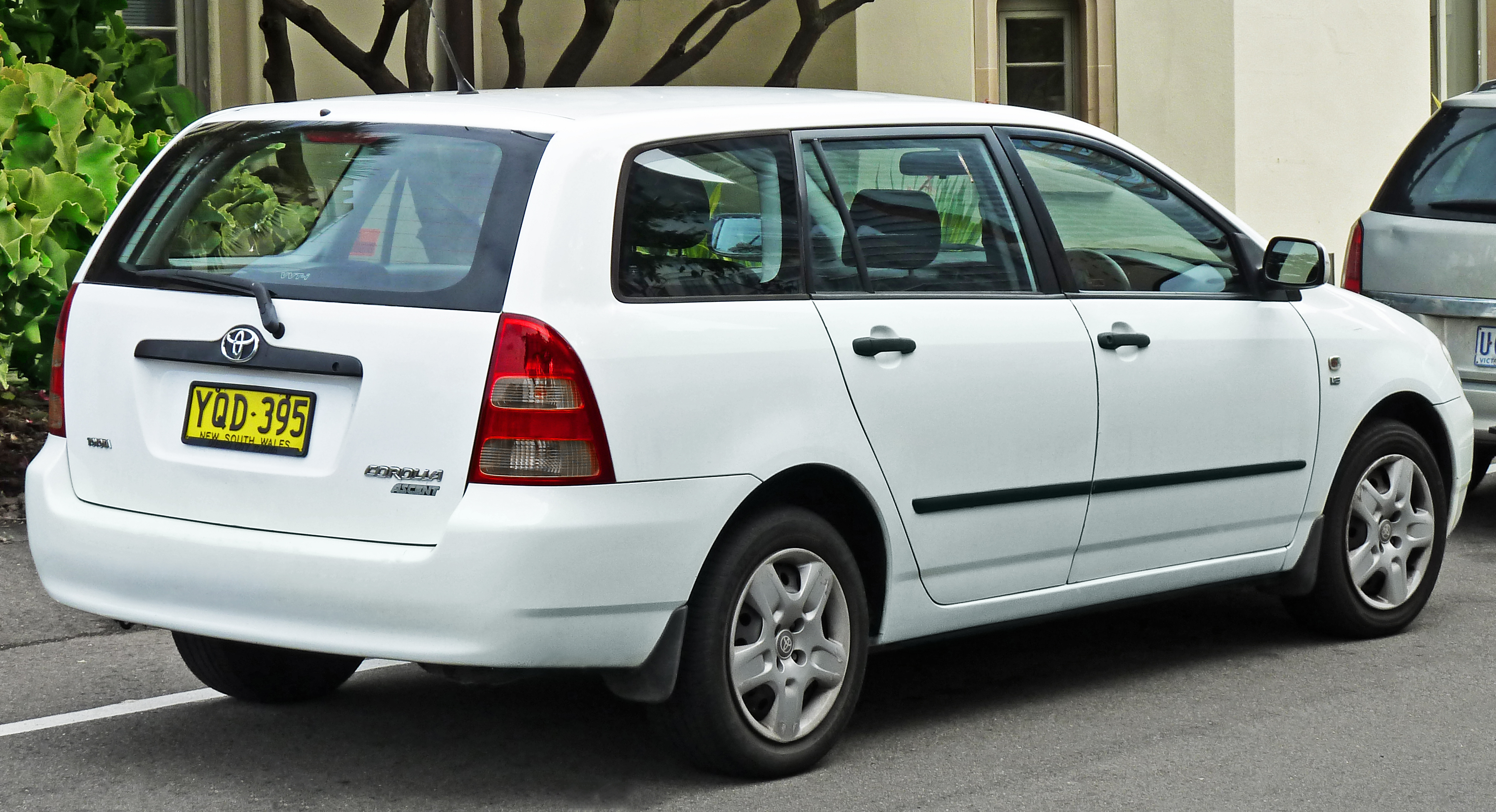
2003–2004 Corolla Ascent wagon (Australia)

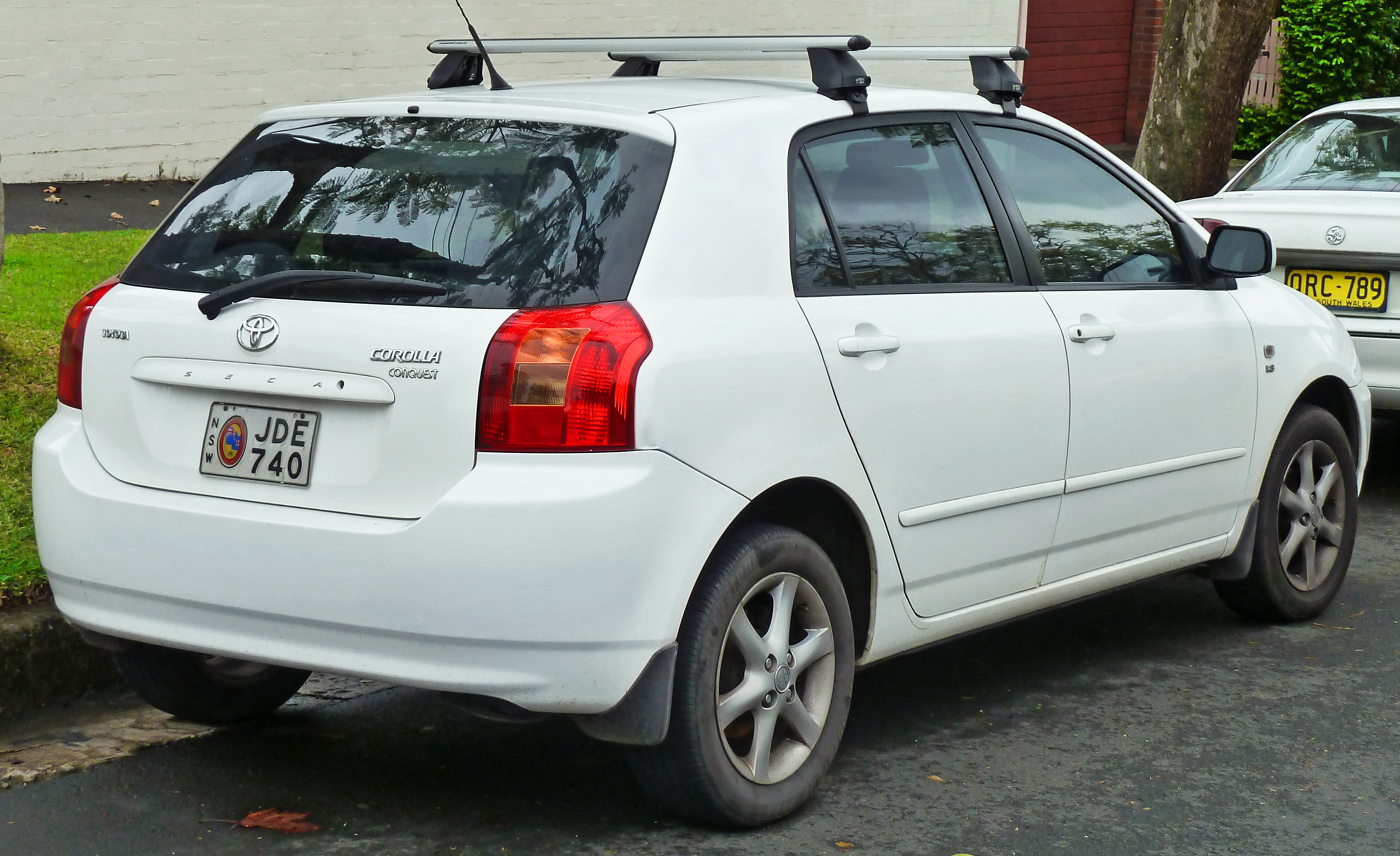
2003–2004 Corolla Conquest 5-door (Australia)

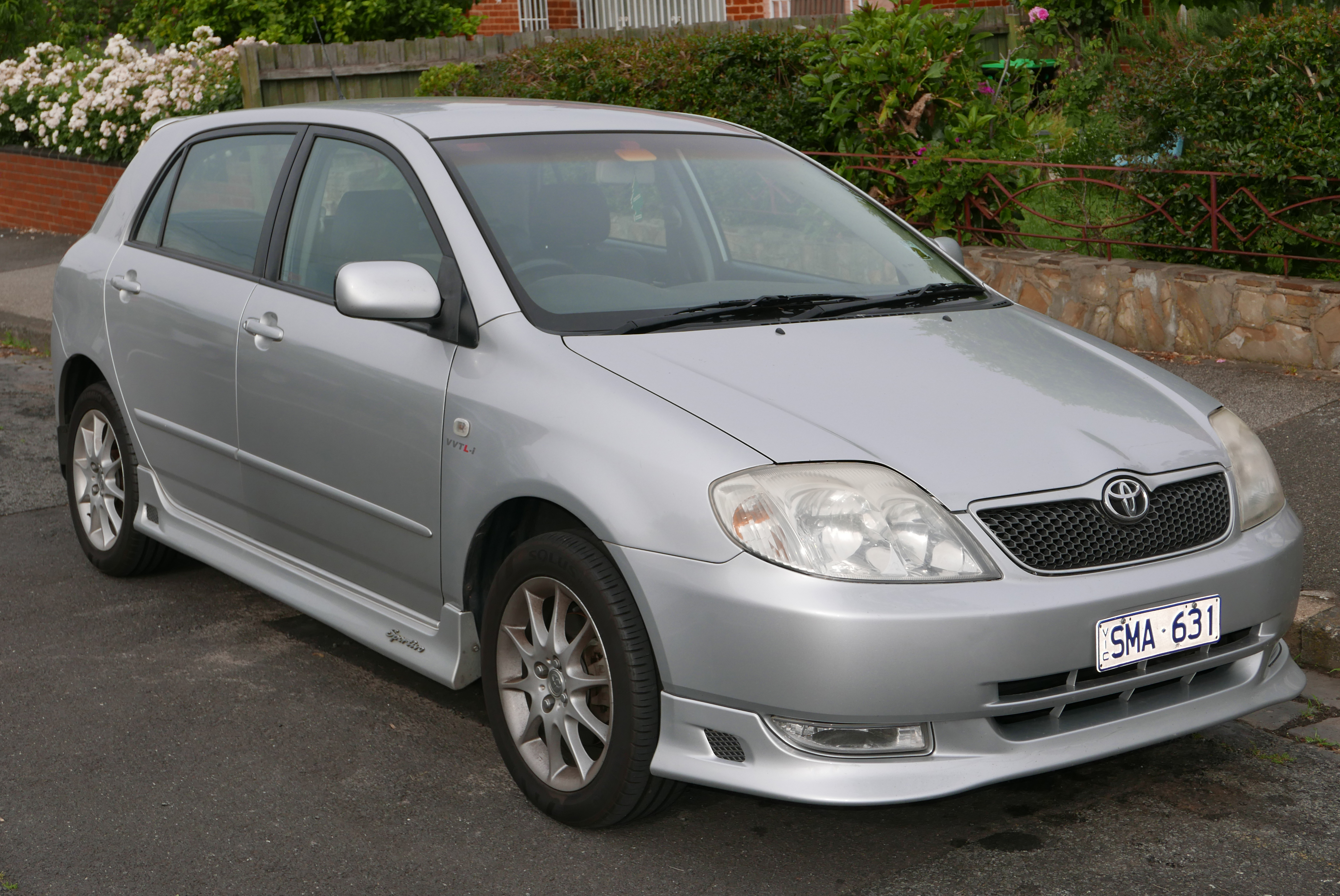
Corolla Sportivo 5-door hatchback (Australia)

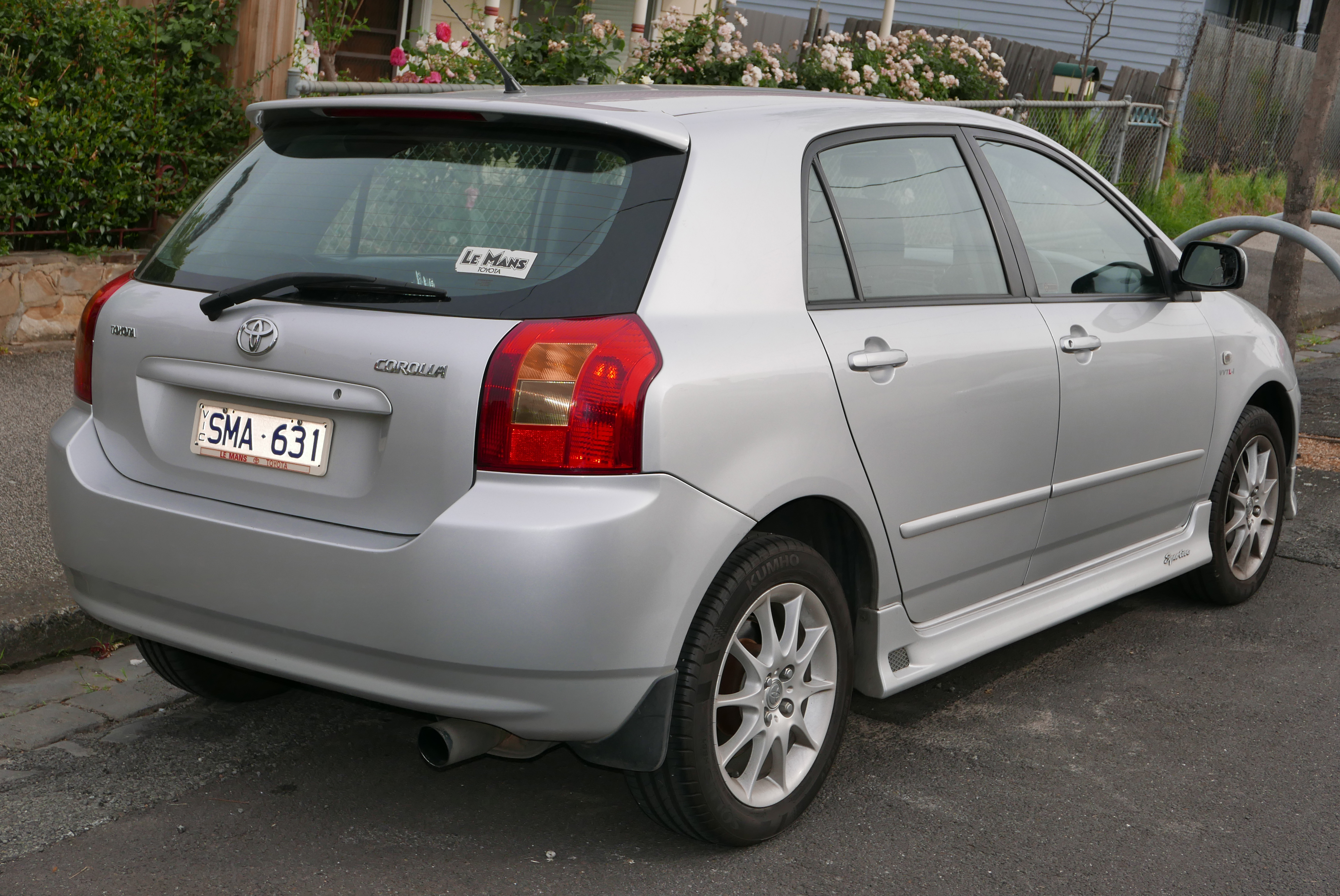
Corolla Sportivo 5-door hatchback (Australia)

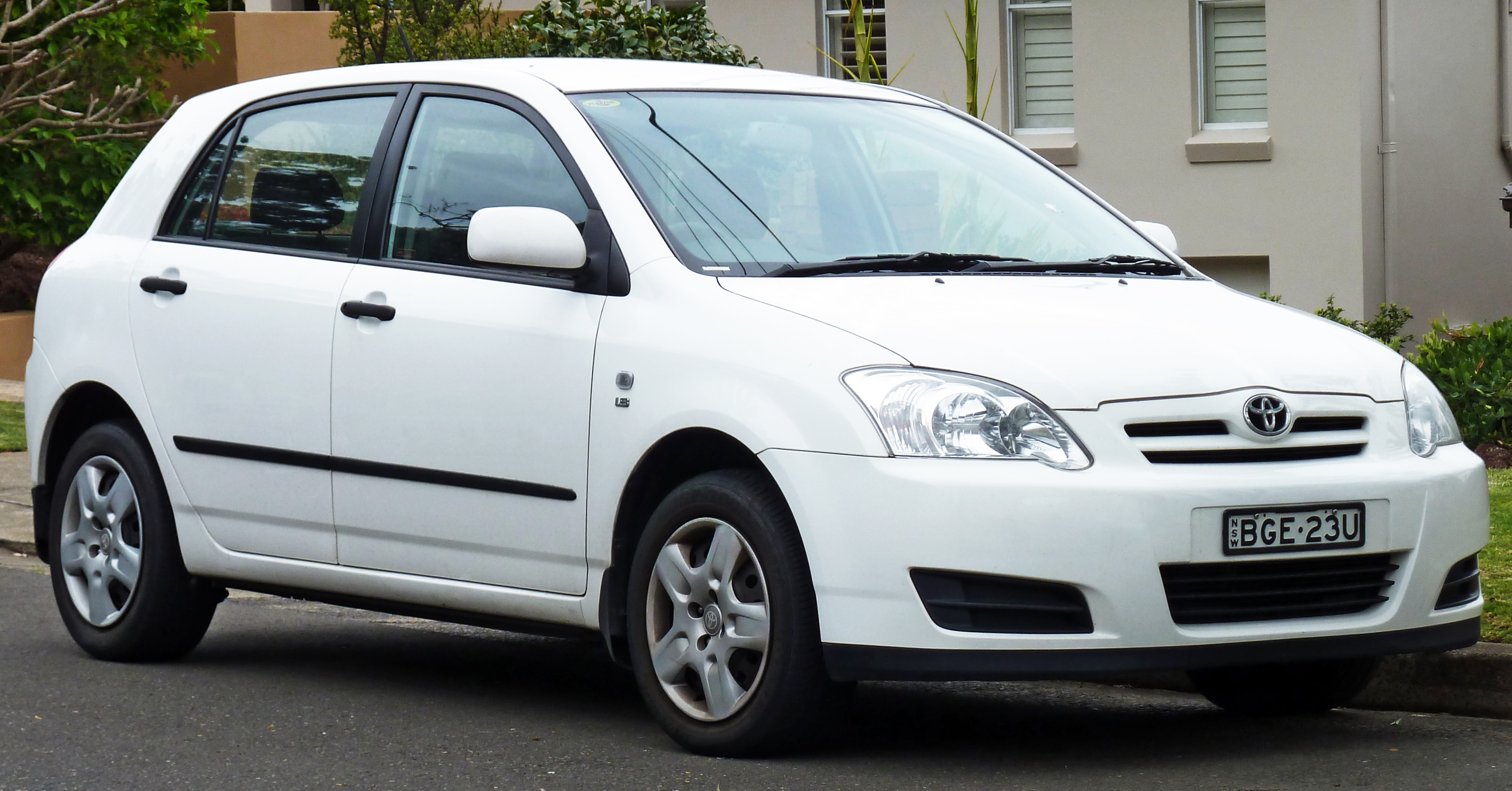
2004–2007 Toyota Corolla Ascent hatchback (ZZE122R; Australia)

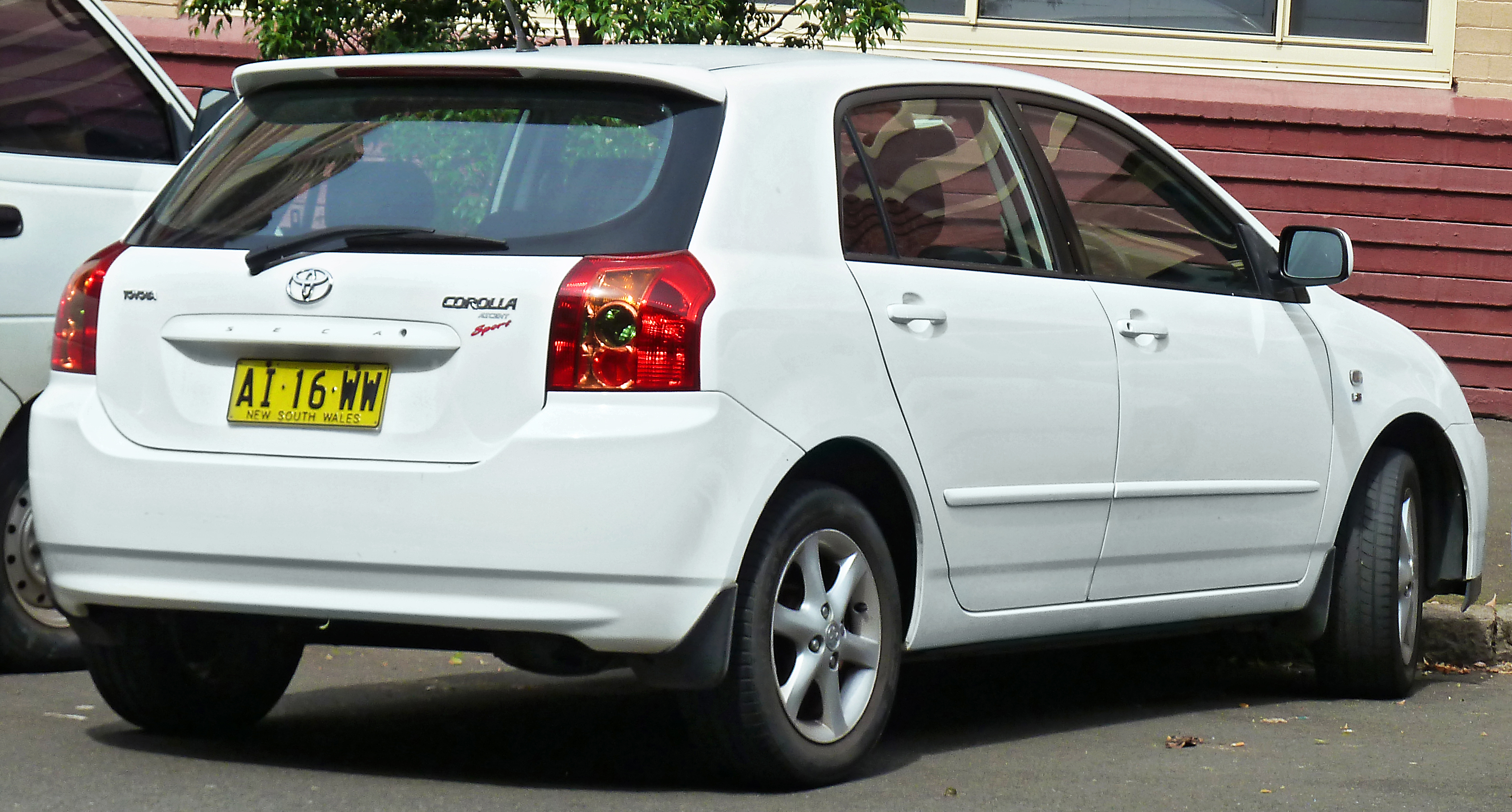
2004–2007 Corolla Ascent Sport 5-door (Australia)

=== Europe ===
For the European market, the Corolla was offered in 3-door hatchback, 5-door hatchback, sedan or saloon, and wagon or Kombi / Estate forms. The high-performance Corolla T-Sport with 1.8-litre 2ZZ-GE engine was available in certain countries.

European and neighbouring market engines:

- 2002–2007 – 4ZZ-FE – 1.4 L (1398 cc) I4, 16-valve DOHC, FI, VVT-i, 97 hp (72 kW)
- 2002–2007 – 3ZZ-FE – 1.6 L (1598 cc) I4, 16-valve DOHC, FI, VVT-i, 109 hp (81 kW)
- 2001–2004 – 2ZZ-GE – 1.8 L (1796 cc) I4, 16-valve DOHC, FI, VVTL-i, 190.5 hp (142 kW), 180 Nm (18.4 mKg) @ 6800 rpm - Valve Lifters 147 kW @ 7800 rpm
- 2004–2005 – 2ZZ-GE – 1.8 L (1796 cc) I4, 16-valve DOHC, FI, VVTL-i, 192 hp (143 kW), 180 Nm (18.4 mKg) - Valve Lifters 147 kW @ 7800 rpm
- 2005–2006 – 2ZZ-GE – 1.8 L (1796 cc) I4, 16-valve DOHC, supercharged, FI, VVTL-i, 215 hp (160 kW) – Compressor (250 UK right hand drive 3 door only models made and sold as TTE Compressor)
- 2005–2006 – 2ZZ-GE – 1.8 L (1796 cc) I4, 16-valve DOHC, supercharged, FI, VVTL-i, 224 hp (167 kW) – Compressor (limited number made, 3 and 5 door, left hand drive, and sold as TTE Compressor)
- 2004–2007 – 1ND-TV – 1.4 L (1364 cc) I4 diesel, 8-valve SOHC, turbocharged, D-4D, 89 hp (66 kW)
- 2003–2007 – 1CD-FTV – 2.0 L (1995 cc) I4 diesel, 16-valve DOHC, turbocharged, D-4D, 90 hp (67 kW) – without intercooler
- 2003–2007 – 1CD-FTV – 2.0 L (1995 cc) I4 diesel, 16-valve DOHC, turbocharged, D-4D, 110 hp (82 kW) – with intercooler
- 2003–2007 – 1CD-FTV – 2.0 L (1995 cc) I4 diesel, 16-valve DOHC, turbocharged, D-4D, 116 hp (87 kW) – with intercooler
- 2003–2007 – 2C – 2.0 L (1995 cc) I4 diesel, 8-valve, 73 hp (54 kW)
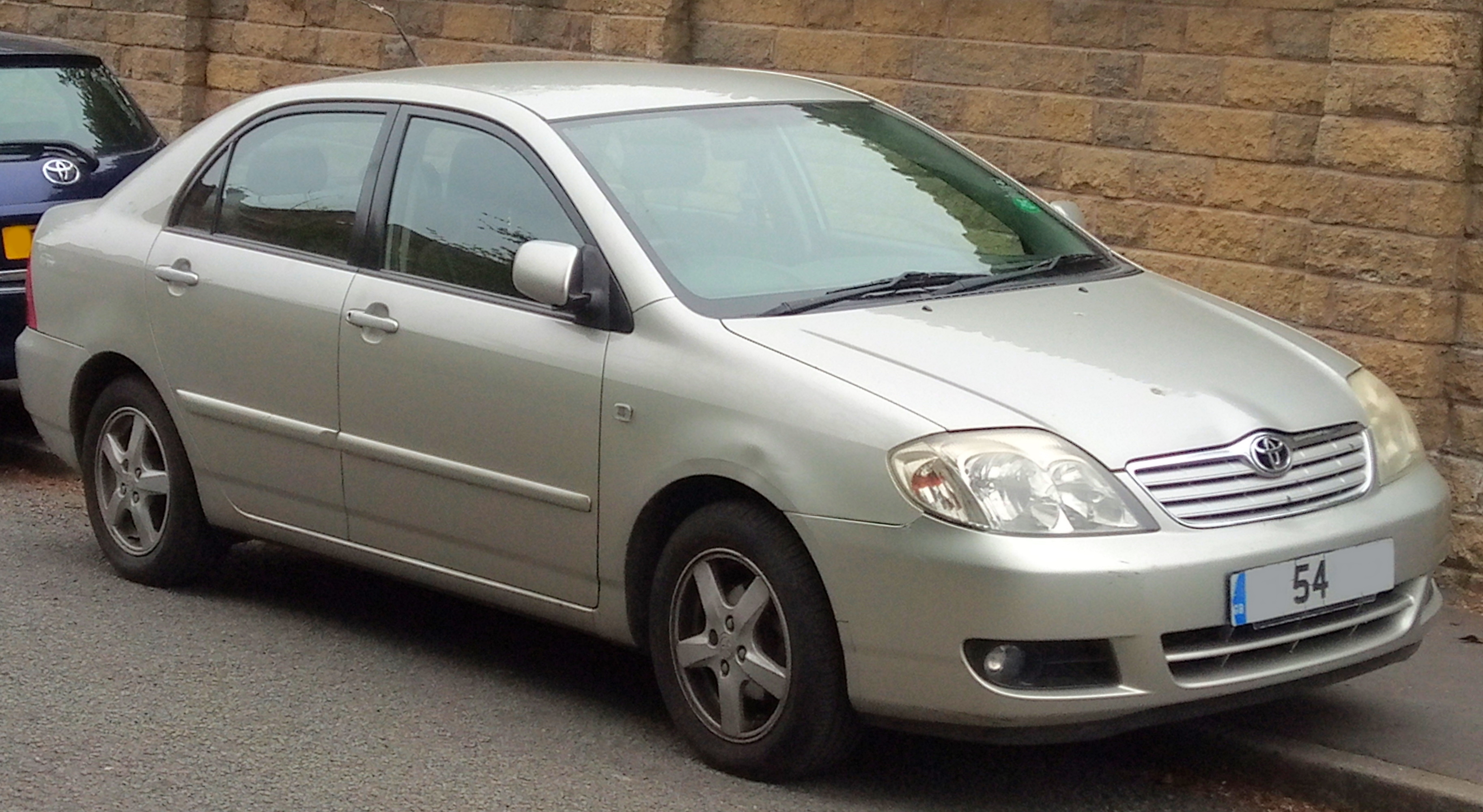
Toyota Corolla saloon (UK)

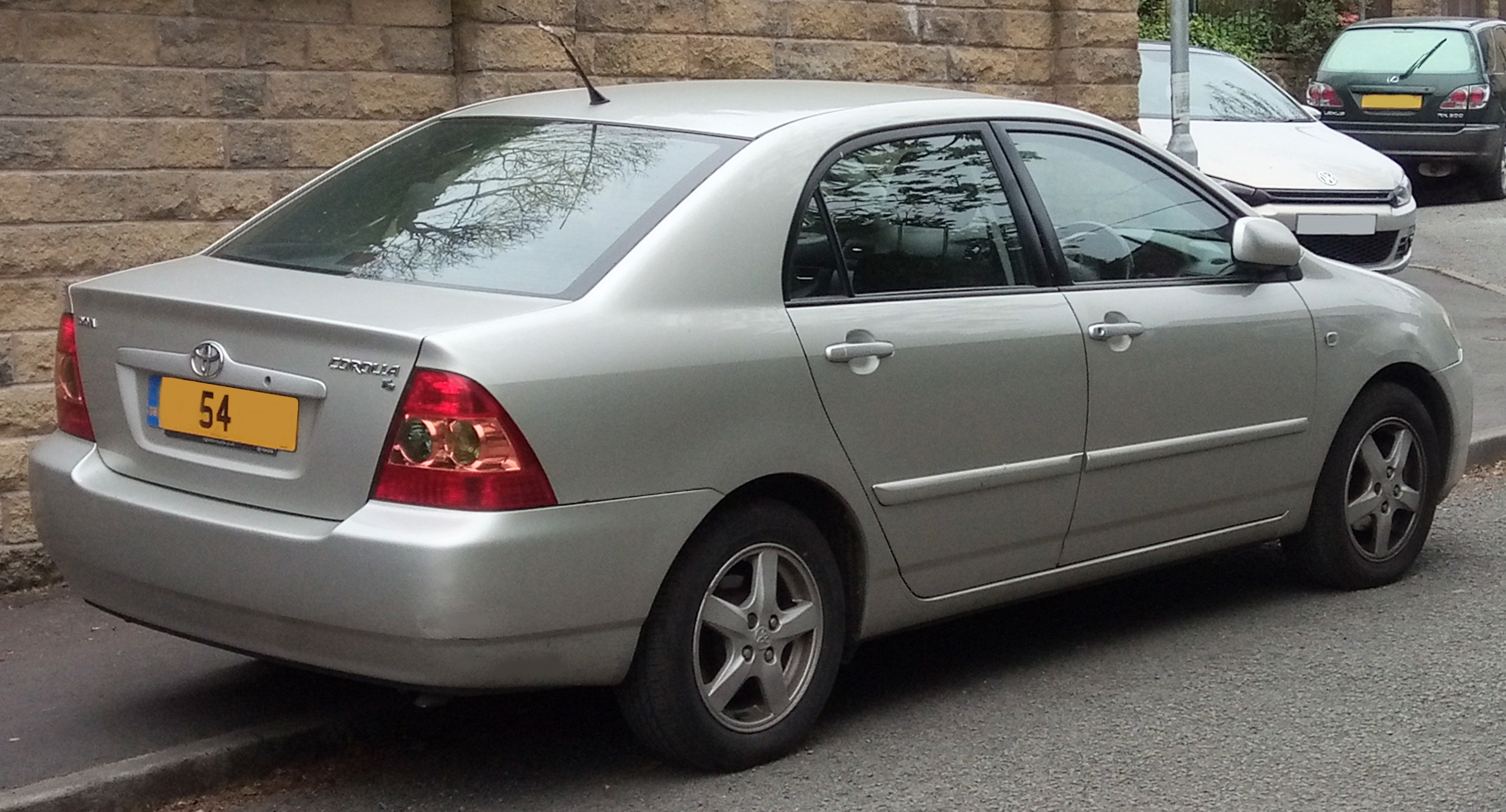
Toyota Corolla saloon (UK)

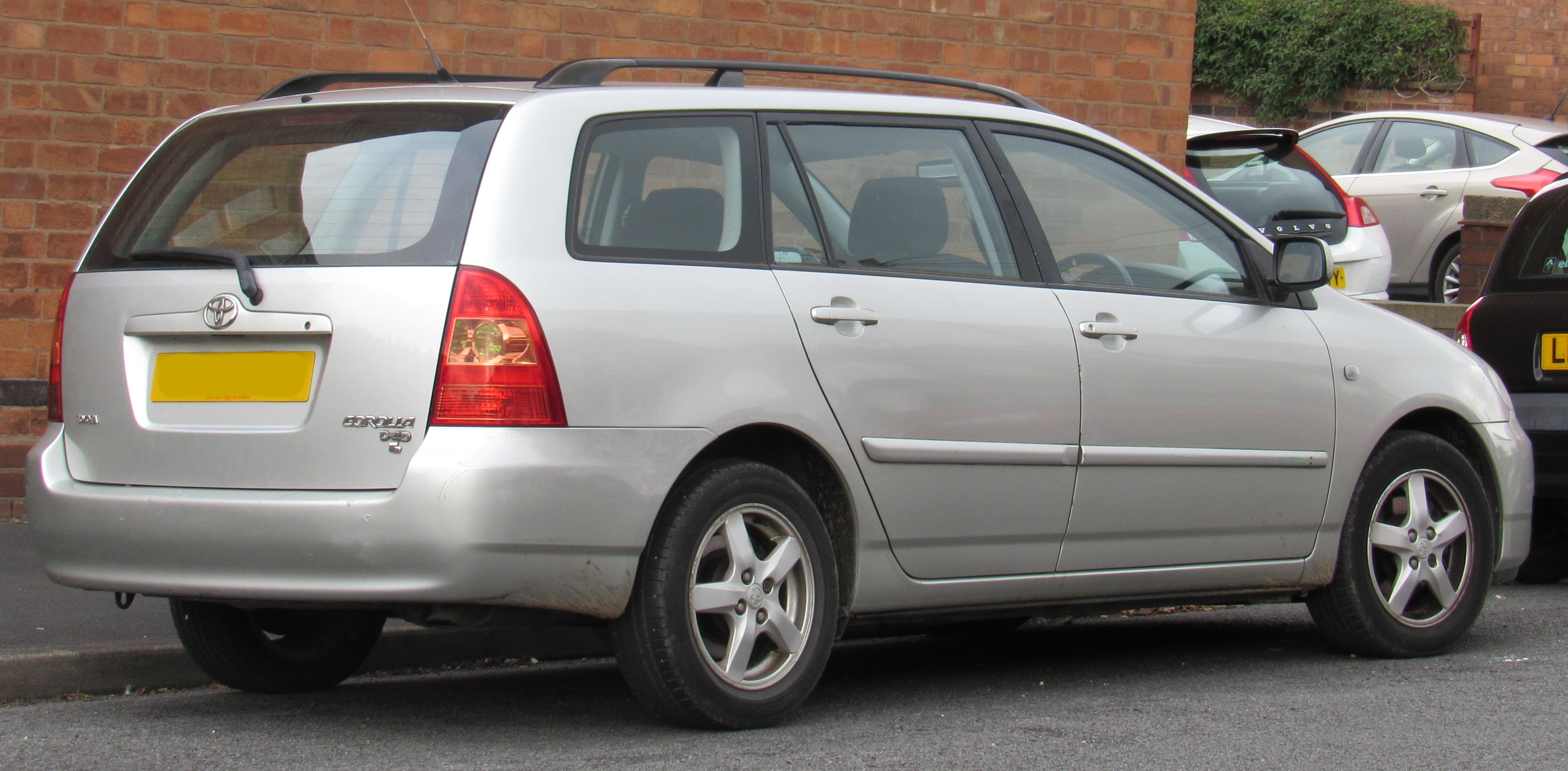
Toyota Corolla estate (UK)

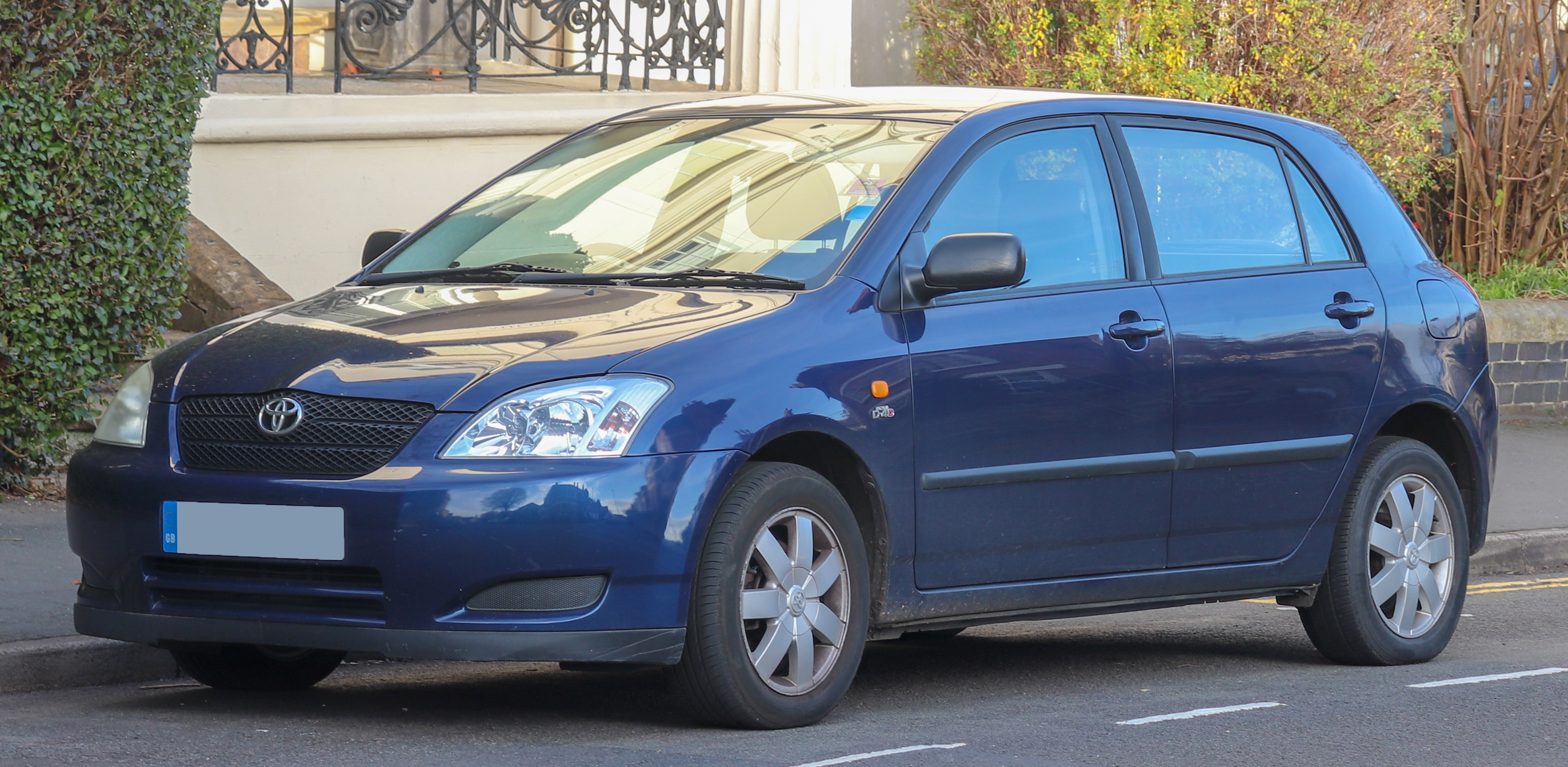
Toyota Corolla 5-door (UK)

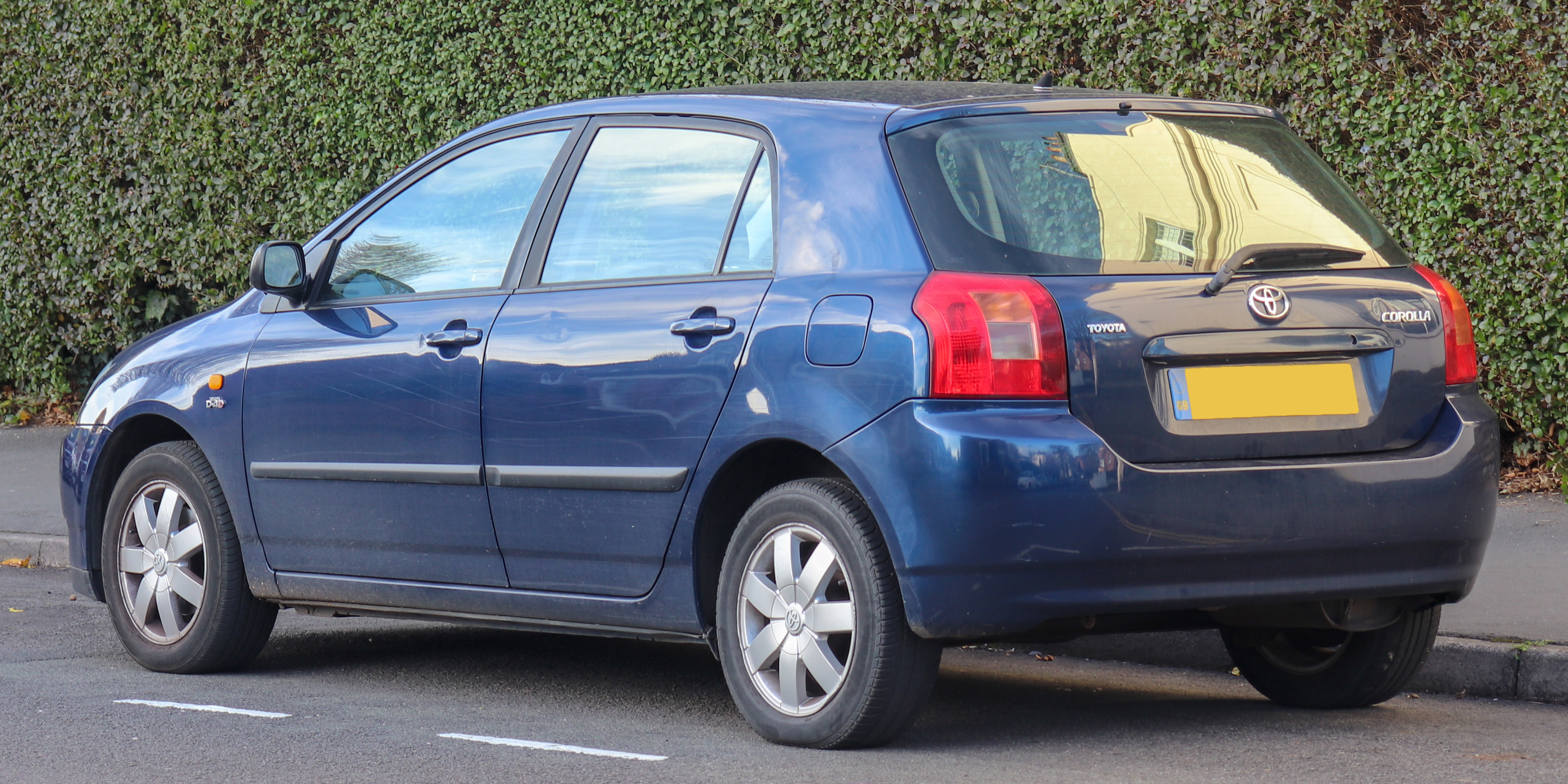
Toyota Corolla 5-door (UK)

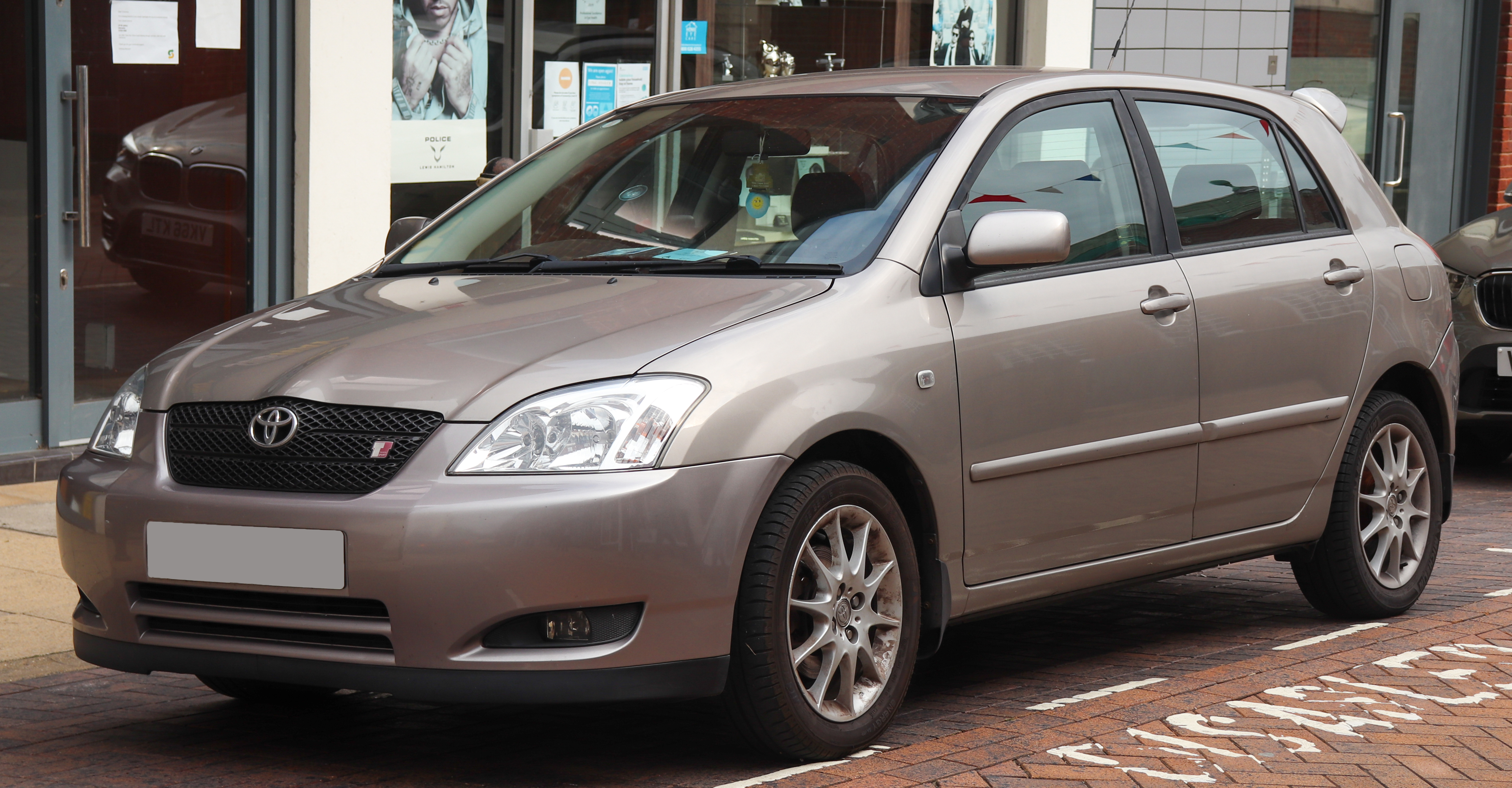
Toyota Corolla T-Sport 5-door (UK)

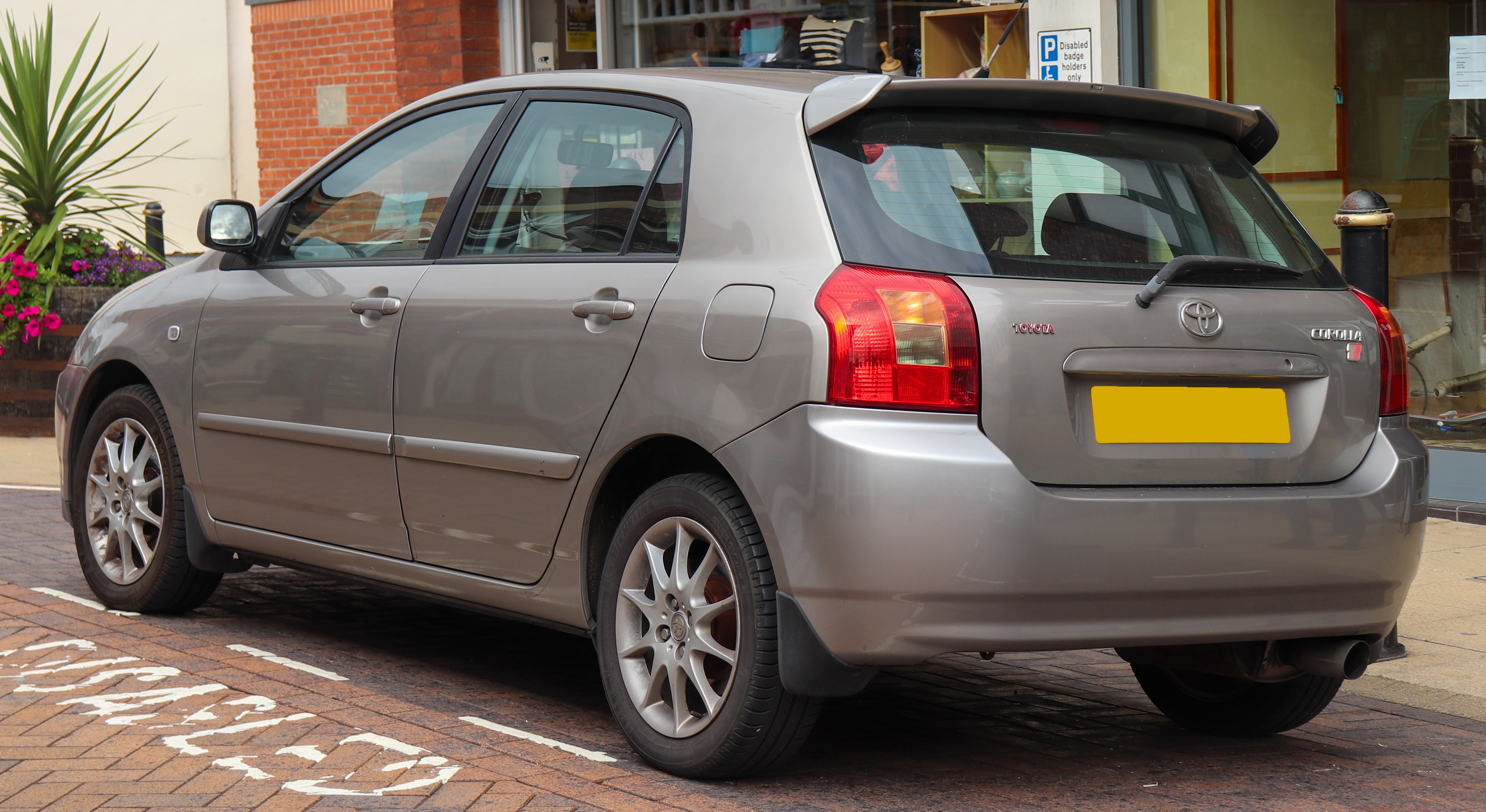
Toyota Corolla T-Sport 5-door (UK)

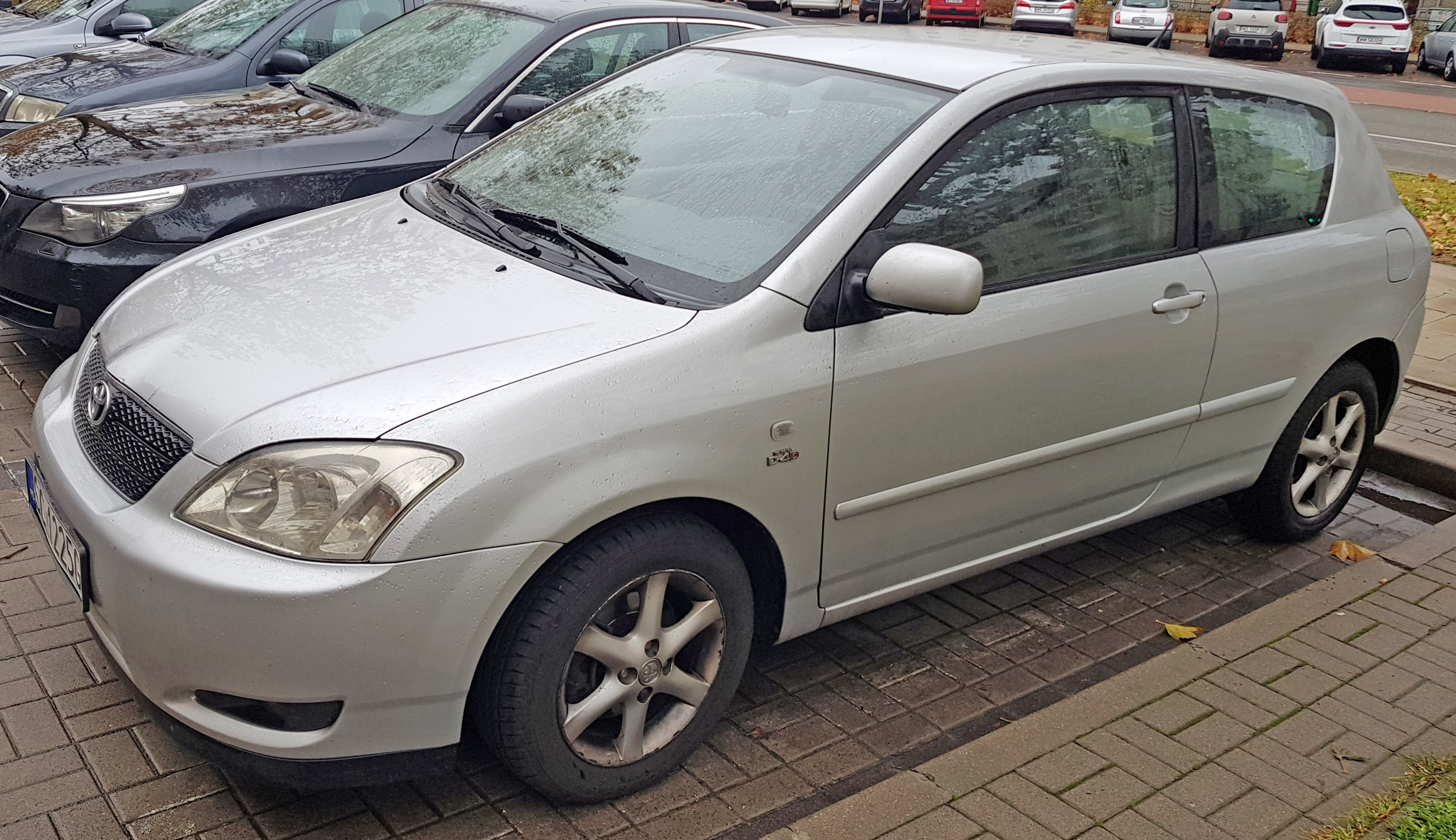
Toyota Corolla 3-door (Europe)

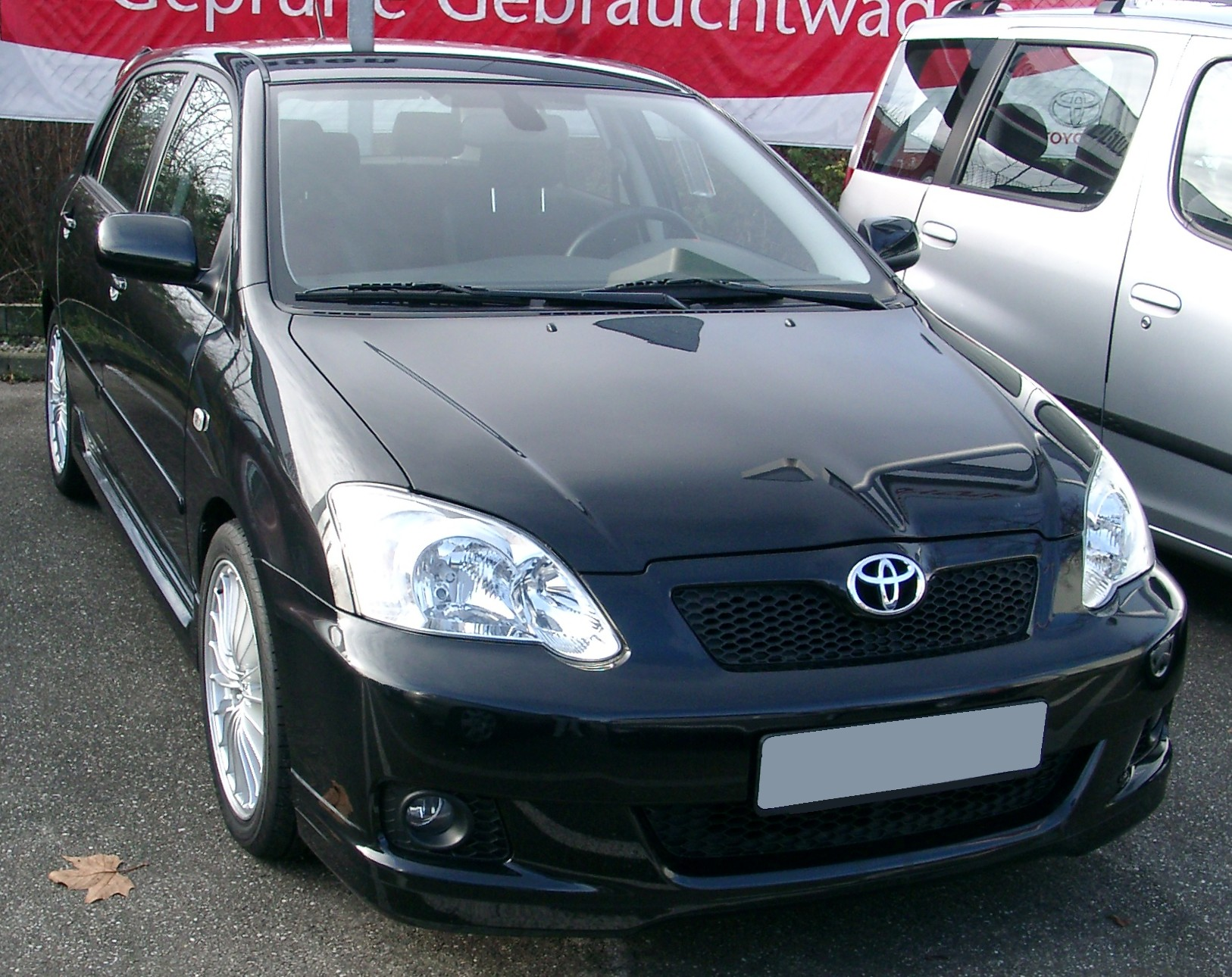
Toyota Corolla T-Sport 5-door (facelift, Netherlands)

== Asian/Americas version ==
=== Asia ===
An upmarket version of the ninth generation Corolla, dubbed the Corolla Altis, is manufactured and sold in countries such as India, Indonesia, Malaysia, Pakistan, the Philippines, Singapore, Taiwan, Thailand and Vietnam. It debuted in March 2001 as a bigger and more luxurious variant of the Japanese Corolla, featuring unique interior and exterior panels that separates it from the basic Corolla. The Corolla Altis is targeted at consumers who prefer more comfort than the standard Corolla but do not wish to buy the more luxurious Camry. Two versions of engines are available: the 81 kW (110 bhp), 1.6 L 3ZZ-FE engine and the 100 kW (134 bhp), 1.8 L 1ZZ-FE engine, both with VVT-i technology.

In October 2003, the Corolla Altis received its first facelift. Changes include a new grille design, a sleeker front bumper, redesigned fog lamps, new LED tail lights, different alloy wheels and minor interior updates (auto climate control became a standard feature in lower end variants). Two years later, to keep up with its newer competitors, the Corolla Altis received its second facelift. Exterior changes include another redesigned grille, redesigned chrome rear license plate ornament, a new third LED brake light, and new audio switches on the steering wheel. China would also receive two additional facelifts for the Corolla Altis (sold as the Corolla EX in that region) in 2010 and 2013, featuring redesigned front and rear fascia's.

Pre-facelift
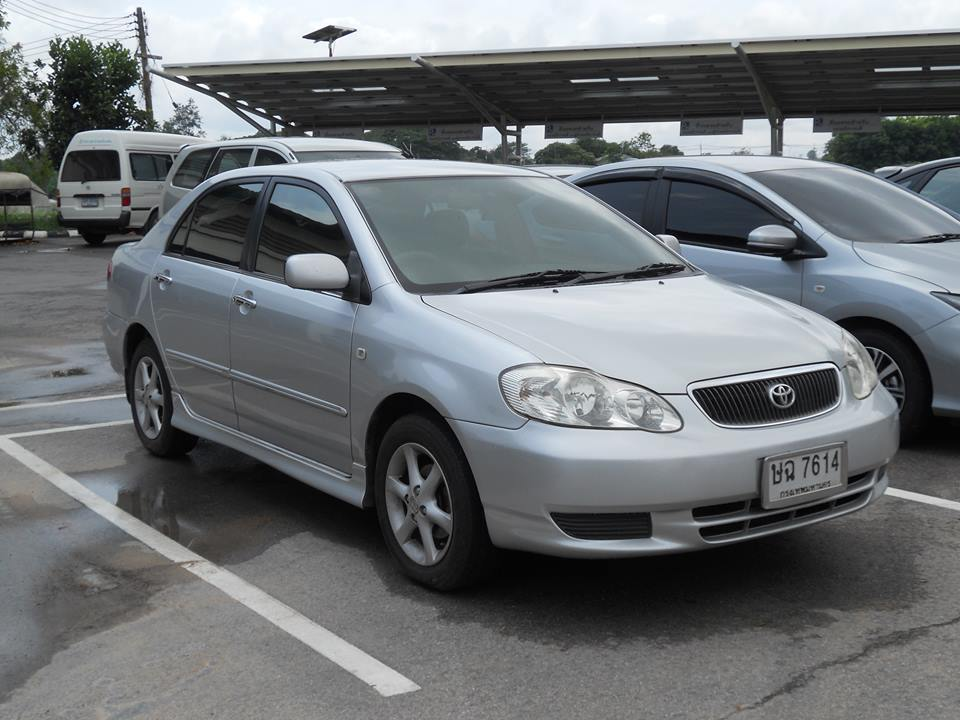
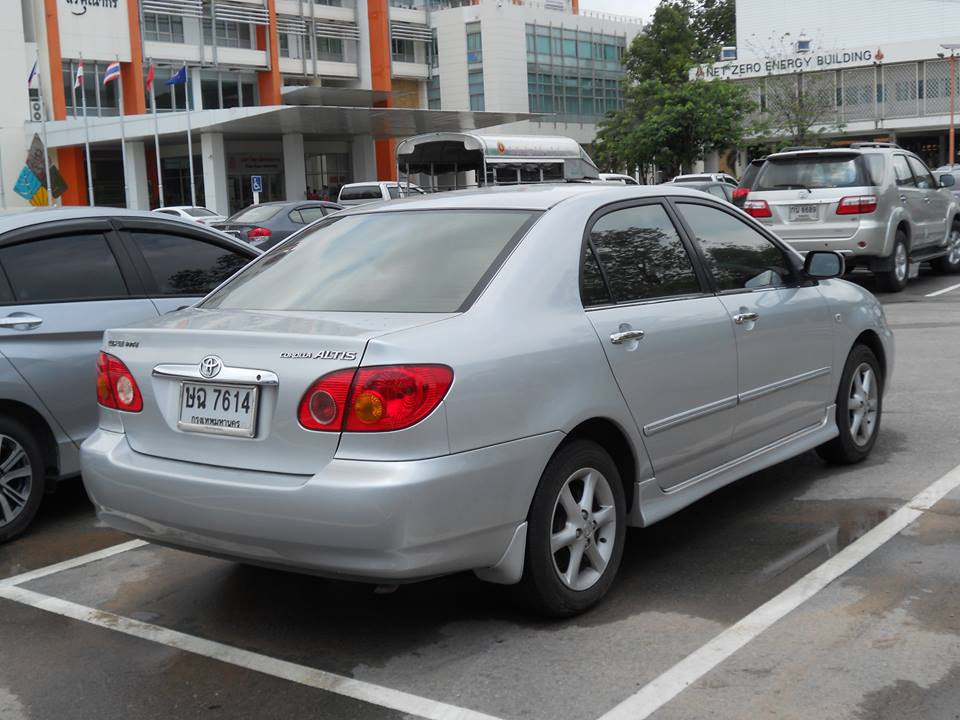
2001 Toyota Corolla Altis 1.6E (Thailand)
First facelift
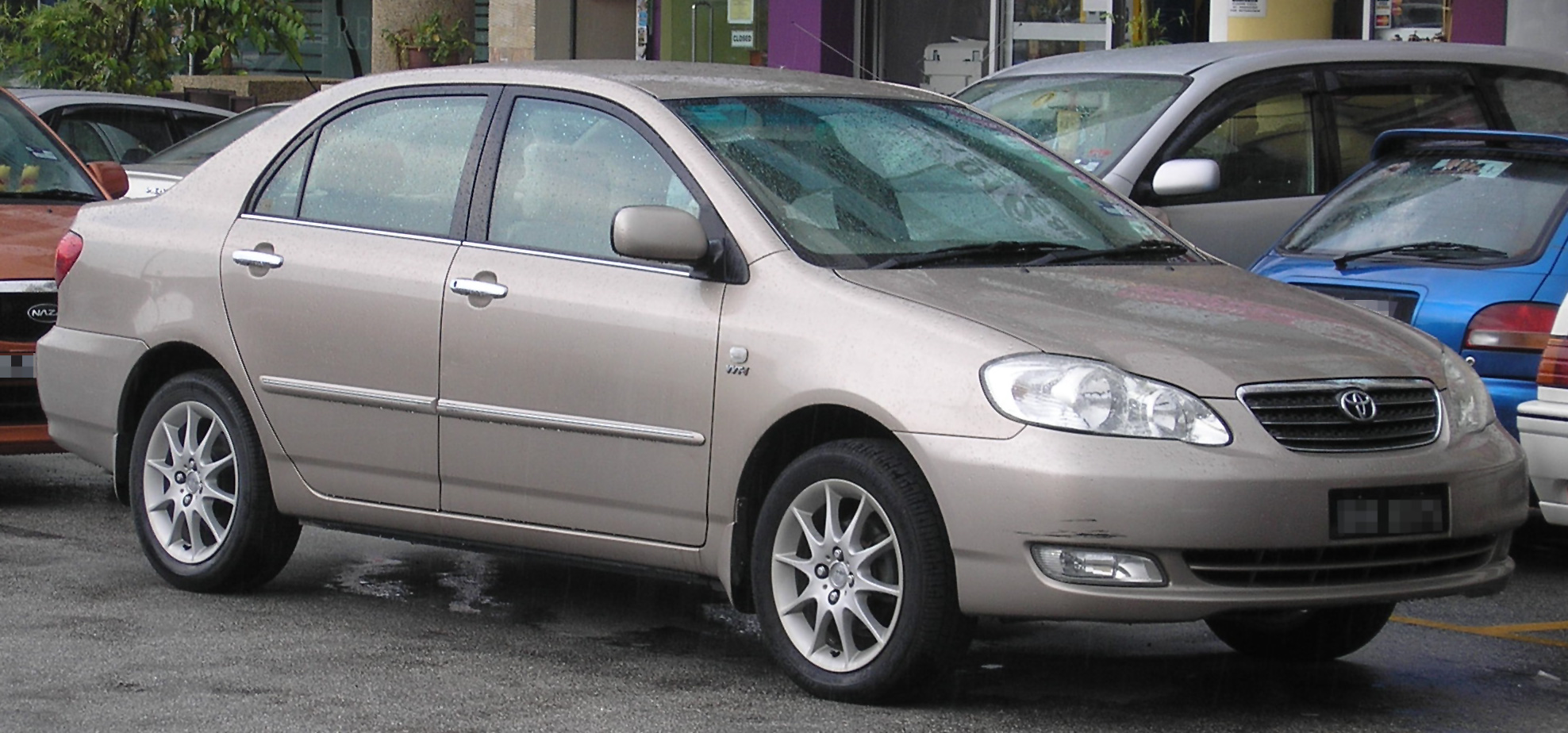
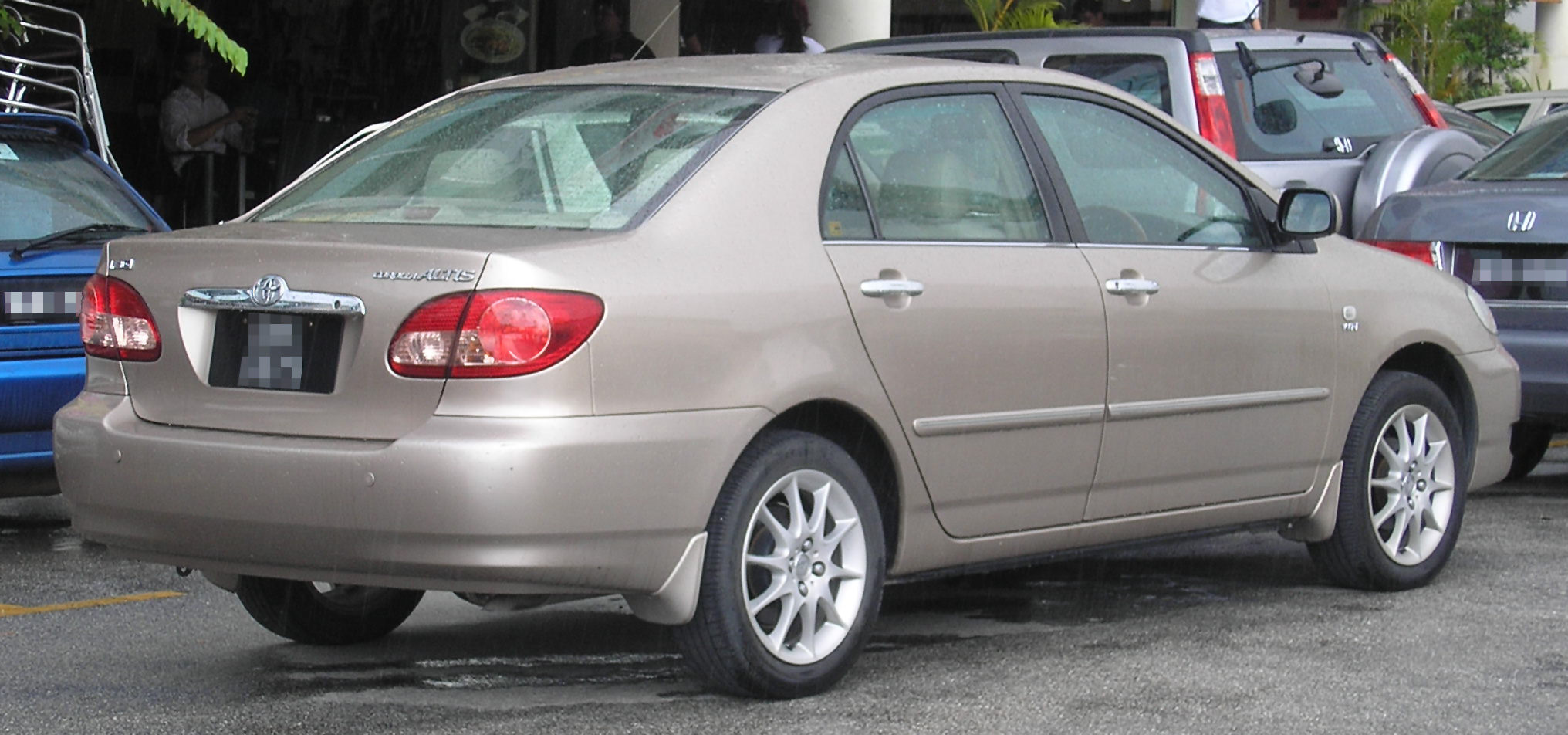
2004 Toyota Corolla Altis (Malaysia)
Second facelift
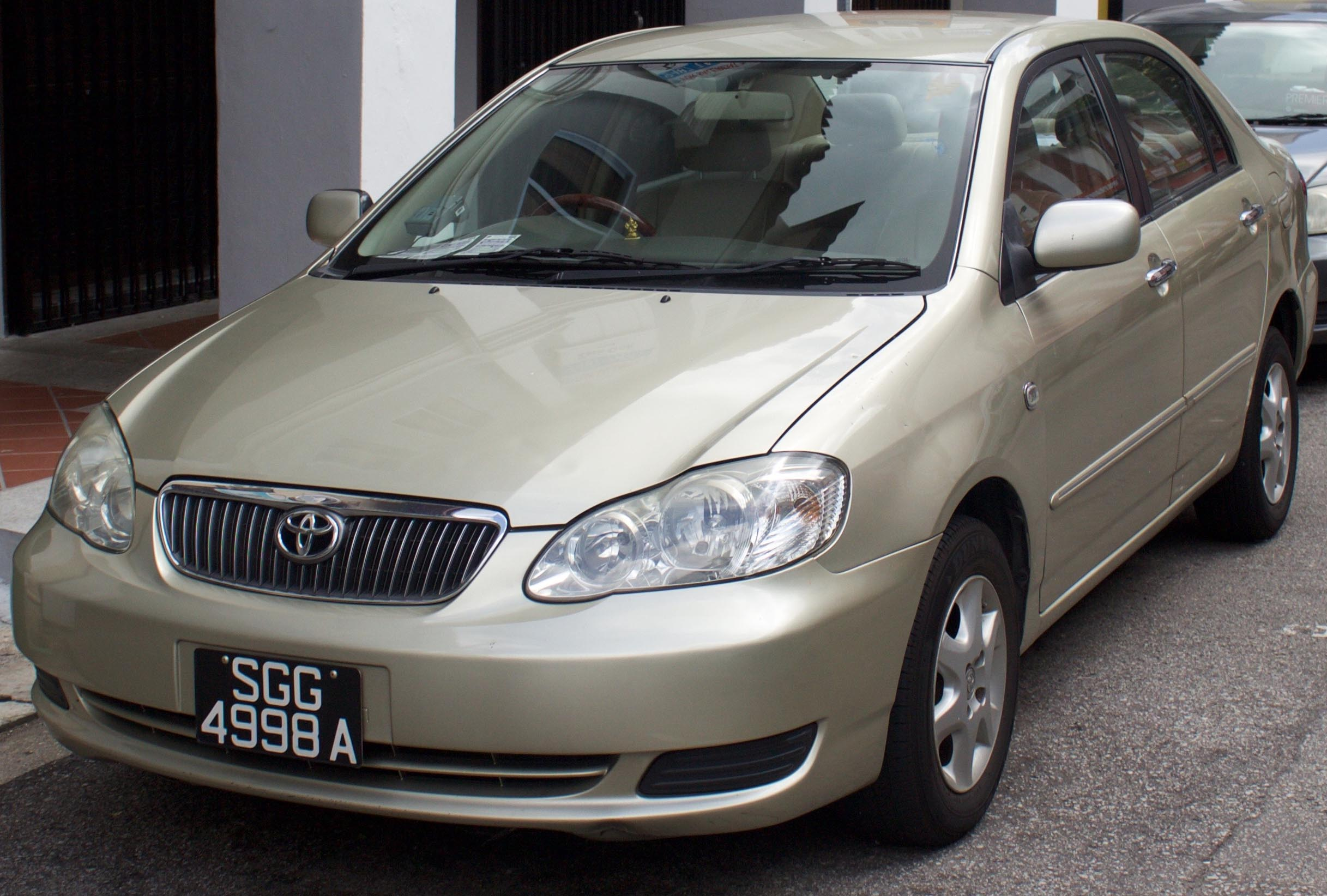
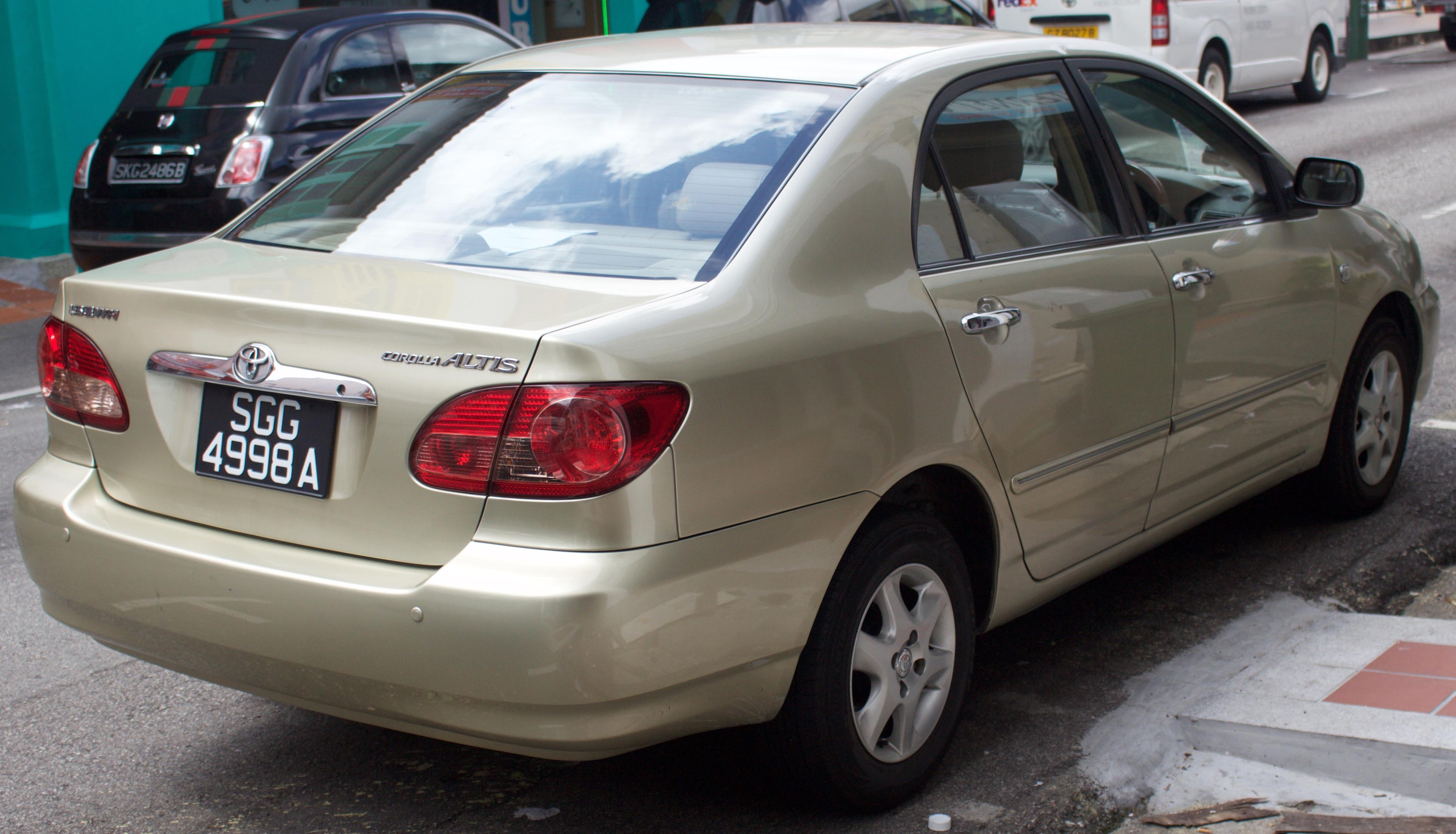
2006 Toyota Corolla Altis 1.6E (Singapore)
Third facelift
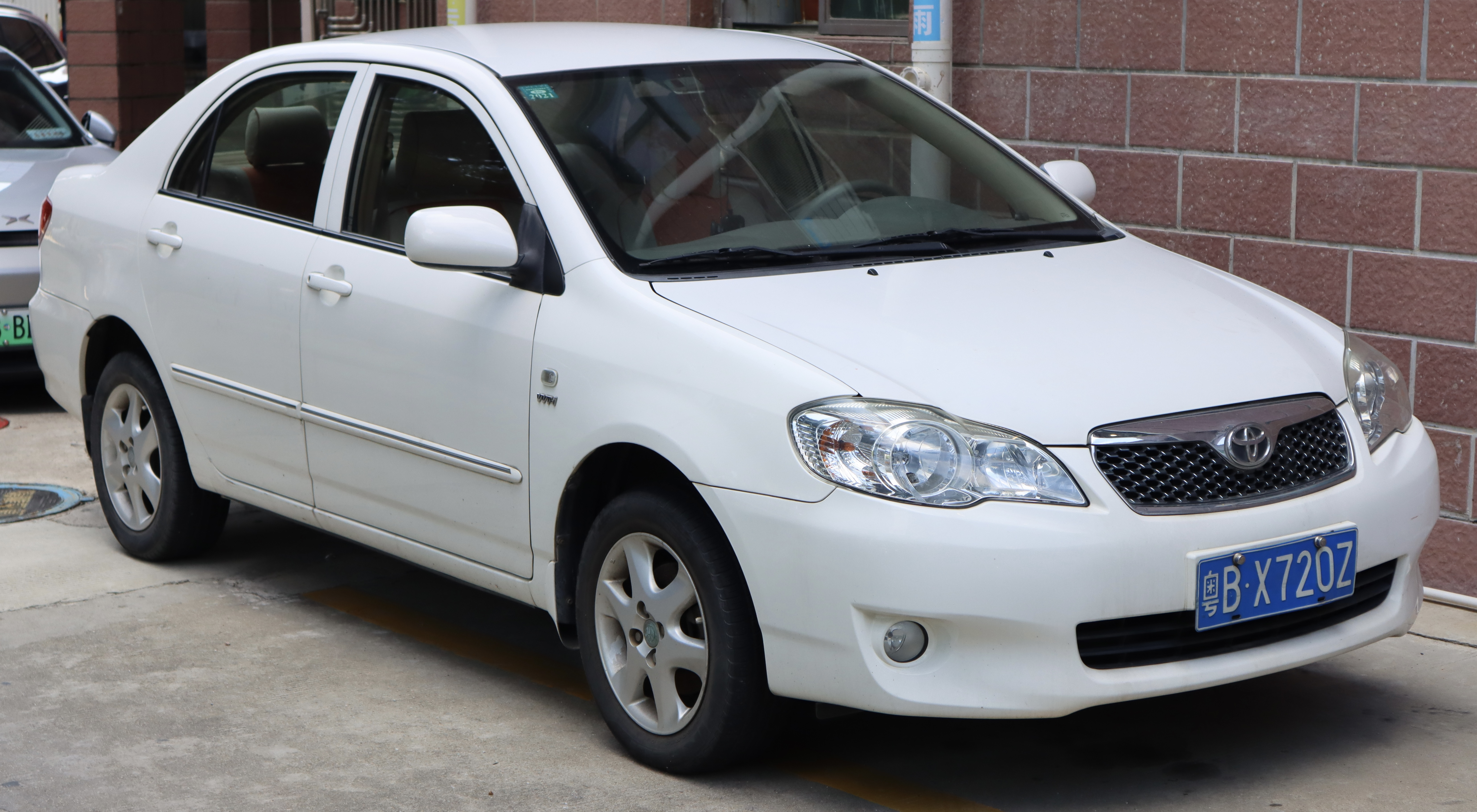
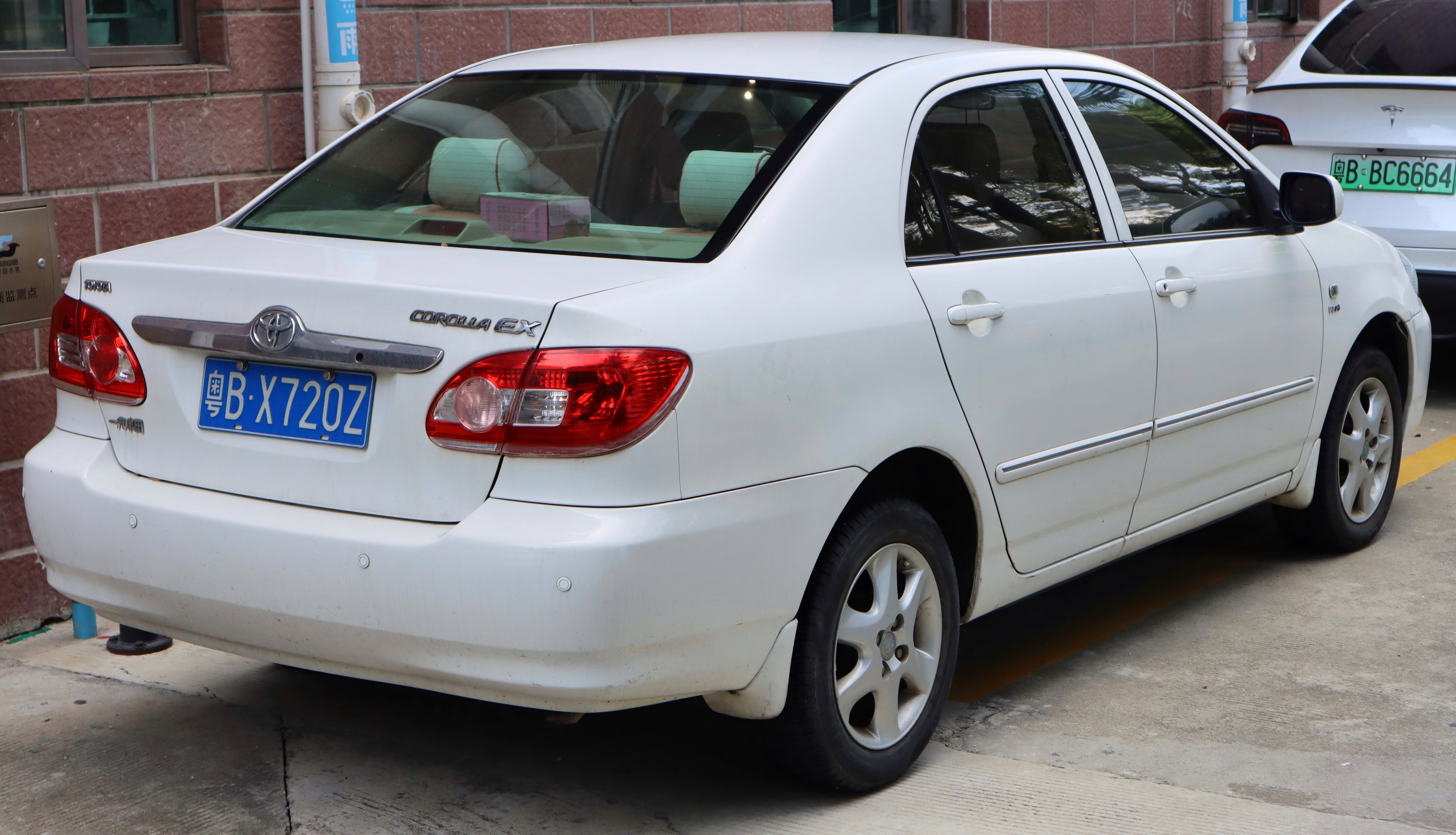
2010–2012 Toyota Corolla EX (China)
Fourth facelift
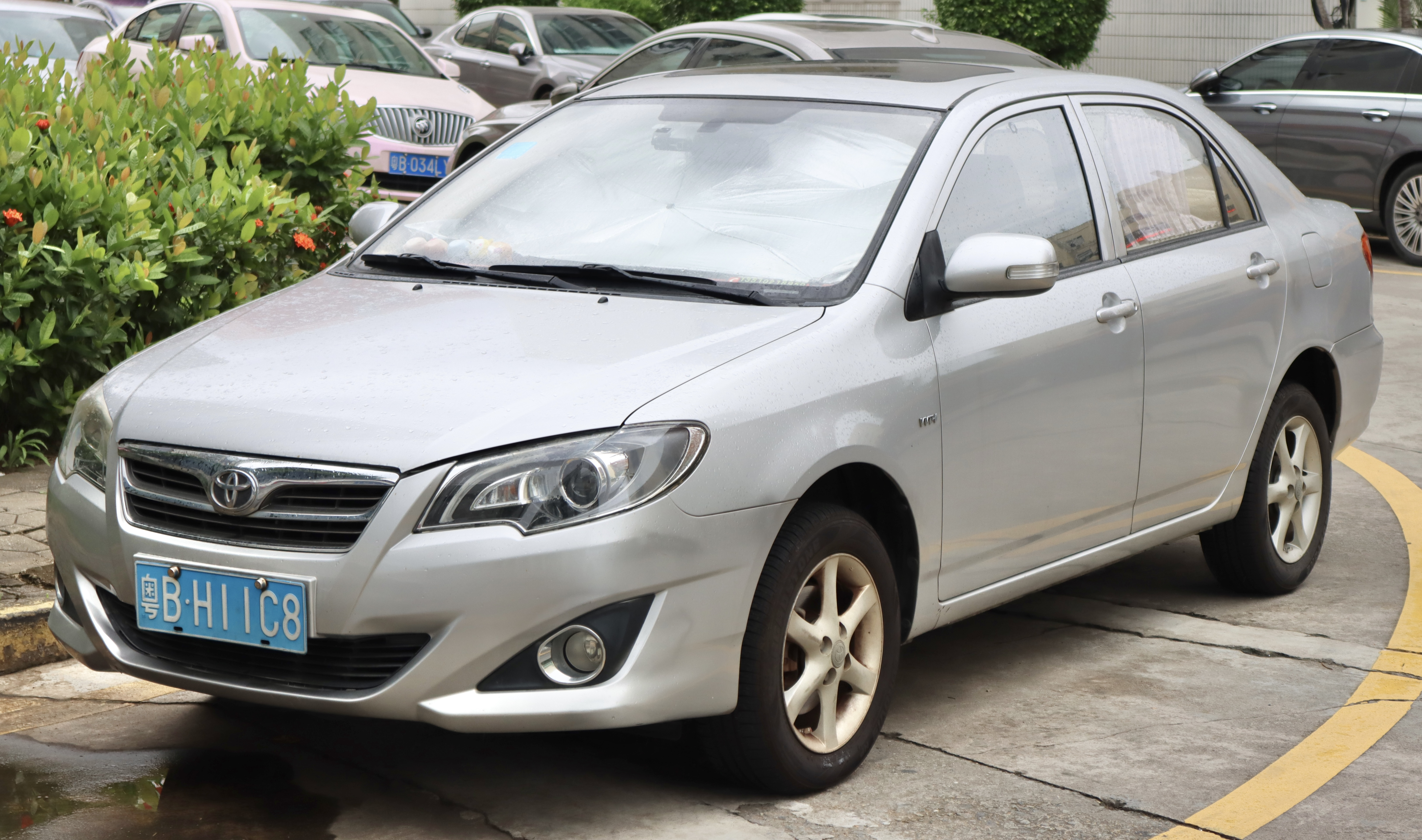
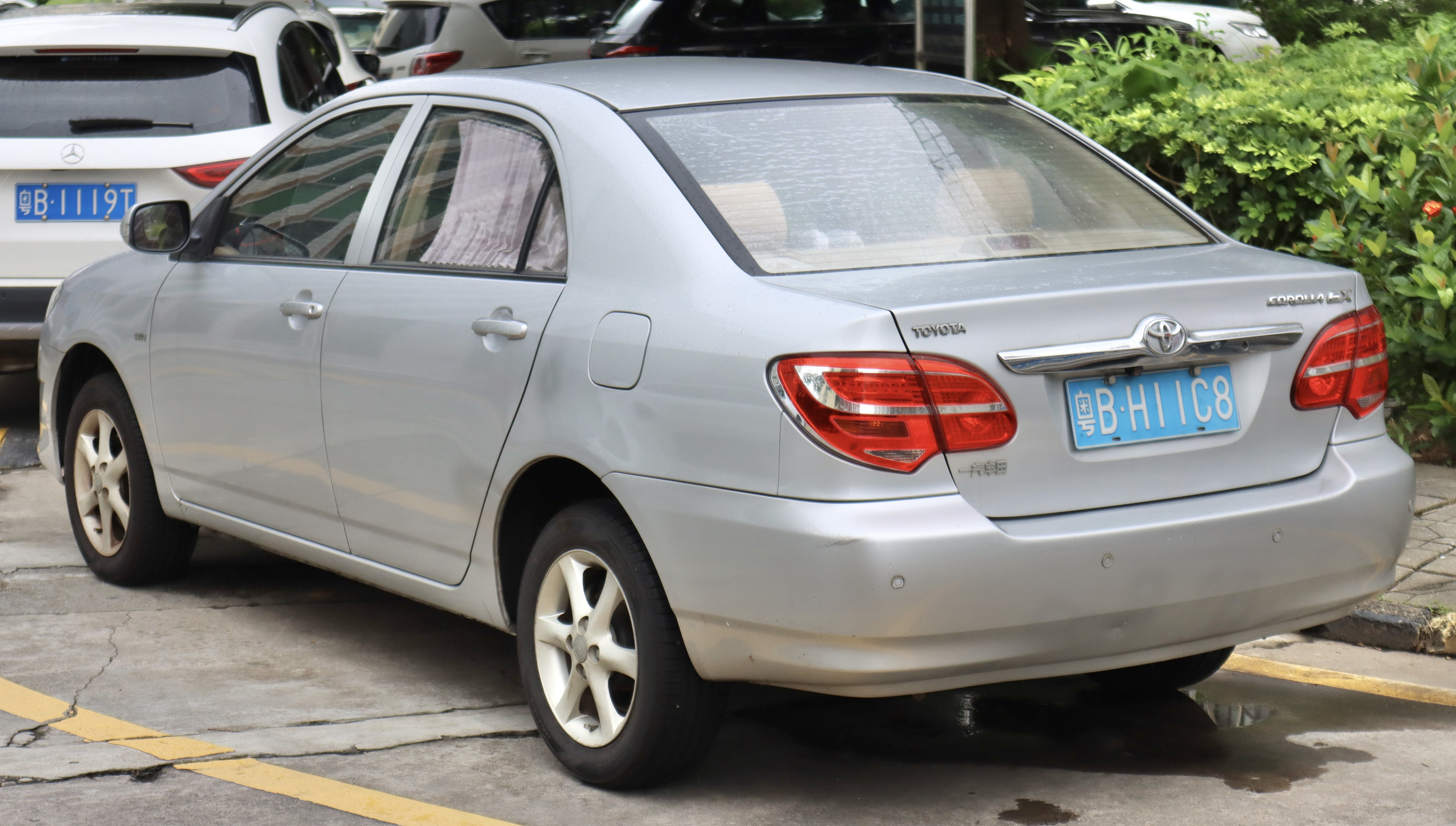
2013–2017 Toyota Corolla EX (China)

==== Thailand ====
The Corolla Altis was introduced in Thailand on 16 May 2001 making it the first country in Southeast Asia to get this model. It is offered a total of three grades (J, E and G), paired with either 1.6-litre 3ZZ-FE and 1.8-litre 1ZZ-FE engine that is standard with Variable Valve Timing with Intelligence (VVT-i). The J grade was marketed simply as Corolla, while the E and G grades were marketed as Corolla Altis. The 1.8S grade was added in June 2002, the specs are the same with the 1.8G grade but it is added with rear spoiler and side skirts. In January 2003, a low end variant of the Corolla and Corolla Altis is also branded as the Toyota Limo, featuring lower spec and intended for taxi businesses in Thailand. Unlike the two aforementioned models, it is powered with the 1.6-litre DOHC non-VVTi 4A-FE engine paired with either 5-speed manual or 4-speed automatic transmission. Due to being the commercial grade of the Corolla lineup, it doesn't have any power features except for steering, but it has 3-spoke PVC steering wheel, single-din AM/FM stereo with mechanical-operated cassette player, manual dial-type air conditioning system, grey Vinyl seats, 14-inch steel wheels, and doesn't includes tachometer and ABS (Anti-lock braking system) with EBD (Electronic Brake-force Distribution) unlike on the regular Corolla and Corolla Altis models. It is not to be confused with the low end taxi version of the Toyota Vios which is also called Toyota Limo in Indonesia.

Marketed as Corolla:

- 1.6 J – 1.6 litre DOHC 3ZZ-FE VVT-i engine, 5-speed manual and 4-speed automatic transmissions, 4-spoke urethane steering wheel steering wheel, includes tachometer, power steering, windows and door locks, colour-keyed door handles, standard instrument cluster panel, single-din AM/FM radio with full-logic cassette player, manual linear-type airconditioning system, gray Fabric seats, 14-inch alloy rims, includes ABS (Anti-lock braking system) with EBD (Electronic Brake-force Distribution and Driver's airbag).

Marketed as Corolla Altis:

- 1.6 E – 1.6 litre DOHC 3ZZ-FE VVT-i engine, 5-speed manual and 4-speed automatic transmissions, 4-spoke urethane steering wheel steering wheel, same specifications and features as the 1.6J with the inclusion of power mirrors, single-din AM/FM radio with CD player, mixed beige Fabric and Leather seats, height adjustment on driver's seat and 15-inch alloy rims.
- 1.8 E – 1.8 litre DOHC 1ZZ-FE VVT-i engine, 4-speed automatic transmission with Super ECT (Sequential-type), 4-spoke leather wrapped beige steering wheel, same features as the 1.6E with the inclusion of power retractable mirrors, chrome door handles, Optitron instrument cluster panel, double-din AM/FM radio with CD player capable of playing 6 (six) CDs, full-logic automatic climate control and Dual SRS airbags.
- 1.8 G – 1.8 litre DOHC 1ZZ-FE VVT-i engine, 4-speed automatic transmission with Super ECT (Sequential-type), 4-spoke leather wrapped beige steering wheel with wood grain trims, same specifications and features as 1.8E trim with the addition of authentic beige Leather seats, Vehicle Stability Control (VSC) and Traction Control (TRC).
- 1.8 S – 1.8 litre DOHC 1ZZ-FE VVT-i engine, 4-speed automatic transmission with Super ECT (Sequential-type), same specifications and features as 1.8 G trim with the addition of sporty black leather seats, elimination of wood grain trim on the interior, a new sporty chrome-metal ball-shape gear knob, side skirts and rear spoiler, added in June 2002.

The facelifted Corolla Altis was revealed for the first time on 19 November 2003. It received a new grille design, a sleeker front bumper, redesigned fog lamps, new LED tail lights, different alloy wheels and minor interior updates. The trims remained the same as the pre-facelift model, but the ABS with EBD function were removed for the 1.6J and 1.6E grades, the 1.6E Plus grade was added to the lineup in August 2005. More than One year after its release, the taxi-oriented Limo gets the pre-facelift Altis grille design in July 2004, the features remained the same as the pre-facelift model and it is still powered by the 1.6-litre 4A-FE engine still paired either with 5-speed manual or 4-speed automatic transmission.

Marketed as Corolla:

- 1.6 J – 1.6 litre DOHC 3ZZ-FE VVT-i engine, 5-speed manual and 4-speed automatic transmissions, 3-spoke polyurethane steering wheel, includes tachometer, power steering, windows and door locks, colour-keyed door handles, standard instrument cluster panel, single-din AM/FM radio with full-logic cassette player, manual linear-type airconditioning system, gray Fabric seats, 15-inch alloy wheels.

Marketed as Corolla Altis:

- 1.6 E – 1.6 litre DOHC 3ZZ-FE VVT-i engine, 5-speed manual and 4-speed automatic transmissions, 3-spoke urethane steering wheel, same specifications and features as the 1.6J trim with the inclusion of power mirrors, double-din AM/FM radio with CD player, beige Fabric seats and height adjustment on driver's seat.
- 1.6 E Plus – 1.6 litre DOHC 3ZZ-FE VVT-i engine, 4-speed automatic transmission, 4-spoke urethane steering wheel, same specifications and features as the 1.6E with the inclusion of ABS (Anti-lock braking system) with EBD (Electronic Brake-force Distribution) and Driver's airbag.
- 1.8 E – 1.8 litre DOHC 1ZZ-FE VVT-i engine, 4-speed automatic transmission with Super ECT (Sequential-type), 4-spoke leather wrapped steering wheel, same features as the 1.6G with the inclusion of wood grain accents trimmed on the interior, chrome door handles, optitron instrument cluster panel, double-din AM/FM radio with CD player capable of playing 6 (six) CDs, full-logic automatic climate control, Dual SRS airbags and 16-inch multi-spoke alloy rims.
- 1.8 G – 1.8 litre DOHC 1ZZ-FE VVT-i engine, 4-speed automatic transmission with Super ECT (Sequential-type), 4-spoke leather wrapped steering wheel with wood grain trims, same specifications and features as 1.8E trim with the addition of authentic beige Leather seats, multi-information display, Vehicle Stability Control (VSC) and Traction Control (TRC).
- 1.8 S – 1.8 litre DOHC 1ZZ-FE VVT-i engine, 4-speed automatic transmission with Super ECT (Sequential-type), same specifications and features as 1.8E trim with the addition of sporty Black leather seats, elimination of wood grain accents trimmed on the interior, new sporty chrome-metal ball-shape gear knob, side skirts and rear spoiler.

The Corolla Altis was facelifted for the second time in June 2006, Exterior changes include another redesigned grille, redesigned chrome rear license plate ornament, a new third LED brake light, new optitron instrument cluster design for higher grades and new audio switches on the steering wheel. The 1.6E Plus grade was rebranded as the 1.6G grade, the 1.8S grade gained with Touchscreen head unit with AM/FM/CD/AUX functionality with capability of playing DVDs. The taxi-only Limo gets the first facelift Altis grille design in October 2006, it gained some features such as power windows, door locks, single-din AM/FM radio with CD player and 14-inch alloy rims that is similar to the Corolla 1.6J model from 2001. It is now powered by the 1.6 3ZZ-FE engine paired with either 5-speed manual or 4-speed automatic transmission similar to the Regular Corolla and Corolla Altis models.

Marketed as Corolla:

- 1.6 J – 1.6 litre DOHC 3ZZ-FE VVT-i engine, 5-speed manual and 4-speed automatic transmissions, 3-spoke polyurethane steering wheel, includes tachometer, power steering, windows and door locks, colour-keyed door handles, standard instrument cluster panel, double-din AM/FM radio with CD player and Auxiliary input, manual linear-type airconditioning system, gray Fabric seats, 15-inch alloy wheels.

Marketed as Corolla Altis:

- 1.6 E – 1.6 litre DOHC 3ZZ-FE VVT-i engine, 5-speed manual and 4-speed automatic transmissions, 3-spoke urethane steering wheel, same specifications and features with the 1.6J trim with the inclusion of power mirrors with power retractable function on automatic variant, colour-keyed door handles, double-din AM/FM radio with CD player, beige Fabric seats and height adjustment on driver's seat.
- 1.6 G – 1.6 litre DOHC 3ZZ-FE VVT-i engine, 4-speed automatic transmission, 4-spoke urethane steering wheel, same specifications and features as the 1.6E with the inclusion of wood grain accents trimmed on the interior, authentic beige Leather seats, ABS (Anti-lock braking system) with EBD (Electronic Brake-force Distribution) and Driver's airbag.
- 1.8 E – 1.8 litre DOHC 1ZZ-FE VVT-i engine, 4-speed automatic transmission with Super ECT (Sequential-type), 4-spoke leather wrapped steering wheel with wood grain trims, same features as the 1.6G with the inclusion of a redesigned optitron instrument cluster panel, double-din AM/FM radio with CD player capable of playing 6 (six) CDs and Auxiliary Input and 16-inch multi-spoke alloy rims.
- 1.8 G – 1.8 litre DOHC 1ZZ-FE VVT-i engine, 4-speed automatic transmission with Super ECT (Sequential-type), same specifications and features as 1.8E trim with the addition of authentic beige Leather seats, multi-information display, Vehicle Stability Control (VSC) and Traction Control (TRC).
- 1.8 S – 1.8 litre DOHC 1ZZ-FE VVT-i engine, 4-speed automatic transmission with Super ECT (Sequential-type), 4-spoke leather wrapped steering wheel with sporty black colour, same specifications and features as 1.8G trim with the addition of Touchscreen head unit with AM/FM/CD/AUX functionality with capability of playing DVDs, sporty Black leather seats, elimination of wood grain accents trimmed on the interior, side skirts and rear spoiler.

==== Indonesia ====
In Indonesia, the Corolla Altis was introduced in July 2001 and it is offered with three grades (J and G) replacing the 8th generation of Corolla since 1996–2001 with two grades (SEG and XLI).

==== Malaysia ====
In Malaysia, the Corolla Altis was introduced in late 2001. Notably in Malaysia the models sold had tail lights that are identical to the models that are sold outside of Asia and Southeast Asia. It features three-round insets for the tail lamps instead of the standard single round inset used in other Asian markets. These were later replaced with the standard single round insets from 2004. Both the 1.6 L and 1.8 L models were sold in Malaysia. A new aerokit and new wing mirrors with signal indicators (similar to the 2007 Camry) is available as an optional package in Malaysia.

==== Philippines ====
In the Philippines, the Corolla Altis was launched in September 2001 and it came in four trim levels: 1.6 J, 1.6 E, 1.6 G and the highest-spec 1.8 G. The first two comes in both 5-speed manual transmission and 4-speed automatic transmission, while the latter two comes only in 4-speed automatic transmissions. It has improved features and more premium amenities compared to its predecessor.

The facelifted Corolla Altis was introduced in December 2003 and it came in same four trims: the base-grade 1.6 J which is paired with 5-speed manual transmission, 1.6 E which are paired with both 5-speed manual and 4-speed automatic transmissions, 1.8 E, and the top-spec 1.8 G which are only paired with 4-speed automatic transmissions. It has added some features such as 8-way power adjustment seats, power retractable side mirrors, etc.

In January 2006, a 1.6 S trim was added to the lineup. Based on the base J trim, it came with extras such as the body kits, front fog lamps, mesh-type grille, 15-inch S-type alloy wheels, 2-DIN audio system with MP3, leather shift knob, 4-spoke leather steering wheel and leather seats and door trims.

==== Singapore ====
In Singapore, Toyota's exclusive authorised dealer Borneo Motors originally sold the Japanese version of the Corolla in 1.5L (LX, XLi) and 1.6L (LX). The facelift Japanese Corolla was launched in September 2003, featuring dual headlamp lamp clusters, updated tail lamp design and front bumper and chrome horizontal grille. It was later replaced with the Corolla Altis in August 2004 with 1.6L and 1.8L variants in automatic transmissions only. The 1.8L model offered optitron display for the speedometer clusters, rain sensors and a zig-zag automatic gearshift layout and some 1.8 model batches included a full body kit as standard. In late 2007, the Corolla Altis was offered in a limited run where the 1.6 models featured interior silver panel trims, and updated double-din head unit, 15” double-spoke rims, honeycomb grille (adapted from the Corolla S) and body kit with a boot-lid spoiler with a special Limited Edition sticker at the boot.

Large numbers of the E120 Corolla Altis were sold and production lasted for seven years, suggesting its popularity in Asia.

ASEAN market engines:

- 3ZZ-FE — 1.6 L (1598 cc) I4, 16 Valve, DOHC, VVT-i, EFI with 3-way catalytic converter. Maximum output: 110 PS (81 kW) / 6,000 rpm and maximum torque: 150 N⋅m (111 lb⋅ft) / 4,400 rpm.
- 1ZZ-FE — 1.8 L (1794 cc) I4, 16 Valve, DOHC, VVT-i, EFI with 3-way catalytic converter. Maximum output: 134 PS (99 kW) / 6,000 rpm and maximum torque: 171 N⋅m (126 lb⋅ft) / 4,200 rpm.

==== China ====
The ninth generation Corolla was sold in China as the Corolla EX through FAW Toyota. It launched in February 2004 and was sold alongside the newer tenth-generation Corolla in its later years. It was also known as the 花冠 (Hua Guan) which is a direct translation of 'Corolla' (crown of the flower) in Mandarin Chinese. Three trim levels were available, namely Value, Excellence & Elegance. The Excellence and Elegance editions were offered with a 5-speed manual or a 4-speed automatic gearbox while the Value edition was only available in manual transmission. The Corolla EX was originally powered by a 1.6 L 3ZZ-FE VVT-i engine upon introduction, which produces 80 kW (109 PS). It was later replaced with a 1.6 L 1ZR-FE dual VVT-i engine producing 88 kW (120 PS). In November 2012, the 1ZR-FE was supplanted by the almost identical 4ZR-FE dual VVT-i engine, also producing 88 kW (120 PS). About three facelifts occurred during its run, one in 2006 and another in 2010 and 2013, featuring cosmetic changes to the front and rear fascia's among others. Production lasted for 13 years—longer than most other Corolla generations—with production being stopped on 17 February 2017.

An electric variant of the Corolla EX was produced and was called the Ranz E50 EV by the automotive marque Ranz, which was owned by Sichuan FAW Toyota Motor. Production for the Ranz E50 EV commenced in April 2015.

=== North America ===
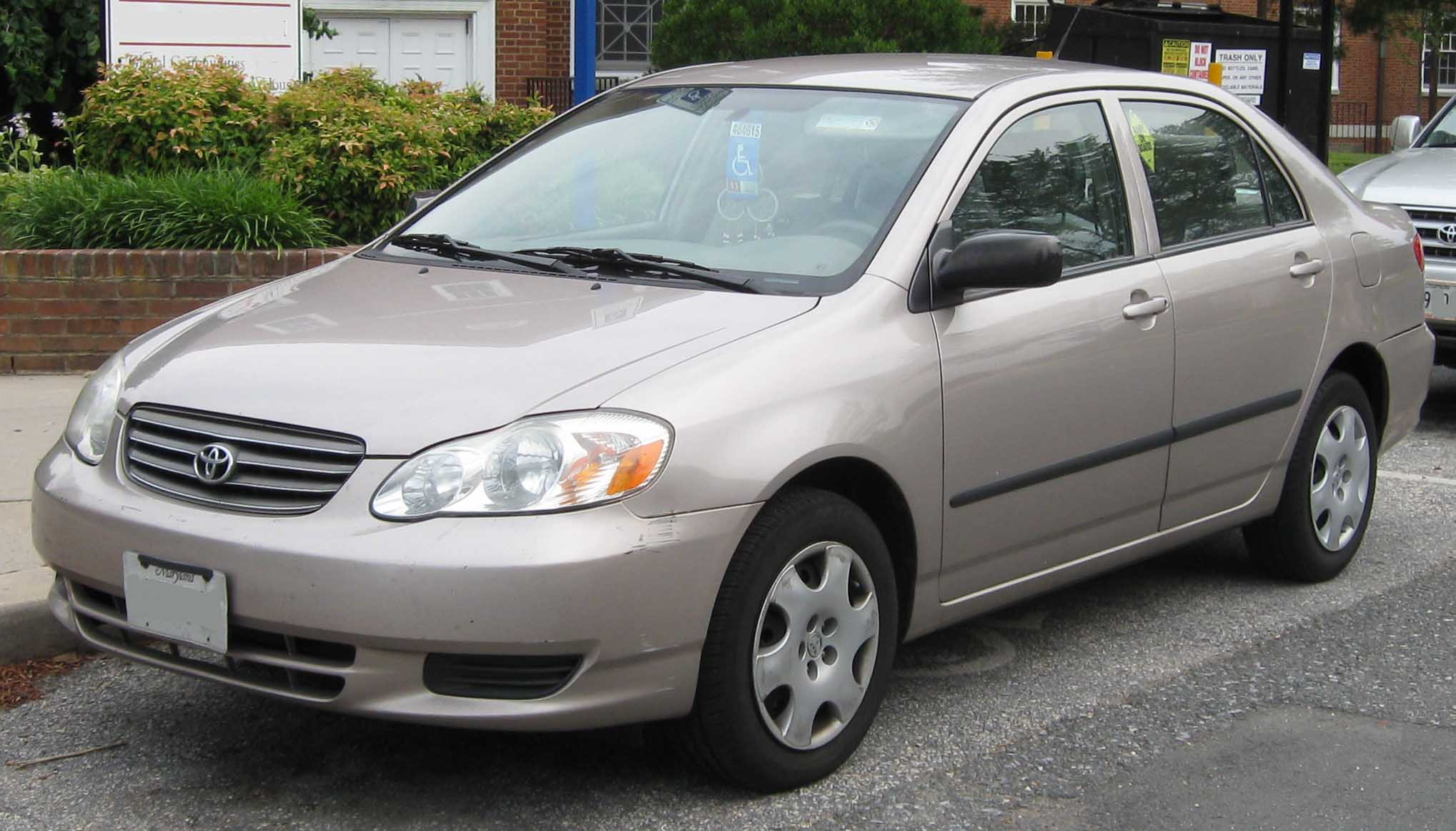
2003–2004 Toyota Corolla CE (US)

The North American Corolla was designed to be larger than the Japanese Corolla, and was based on the Corolla Altis distributed in Southeast Asia. It came to the United States in January 2002 for the 2003 model year, following its unveiling at the 2002 North American International Auto Show in January.

The 1998 E120 design proposal by Masao Saito's had been frozen for production in early 1999, with patents filed on 22 July 1999 at the Japan Patent Office under patent number 1120997.

Trim levels offered were CE, LE, and S, continuing from the previous generation. Production for the ninth-generation Corolla ended in December 2007, with the tenth-generation Corolla introduced in January 2008 as a 2009 model. The Corolla carried over the 1ZZ-FE of the previous generation, with a plastic intake manifold. Power output was increased to 130 hp. The Corolla grew in height from the previous generation, and used larger 15-inch wheels, resulting in increased size and weight compared to the previous generation. The S trim level featured sportier front and rear bumpers and side skirts, but maintained side skirts and fog lights like the previous model.

Official Toyota accessories available through dealerships for all ninth generation Corollas include: front-end mask, gold emblem package, mudguards, 15" flared 5-spoke aluminium alloy wheels, wheel locks, simulated carbon fibre dash appliqué, simulated blackwood dash appliqué, auto-dimming electrochromic rearview mirror, ashtray cup, carpeted floor mats, all-weather floor mats, cargo net, cargo mat, Cargo-Logic cargo mat by Nifty Products, cargo tote, first aid kit, Toyota VIP RS3200 remote keyless security system (CE, S), Toyota VIP RS3200 Plus security system (S, LE), and a CD autochanger (6-disc).

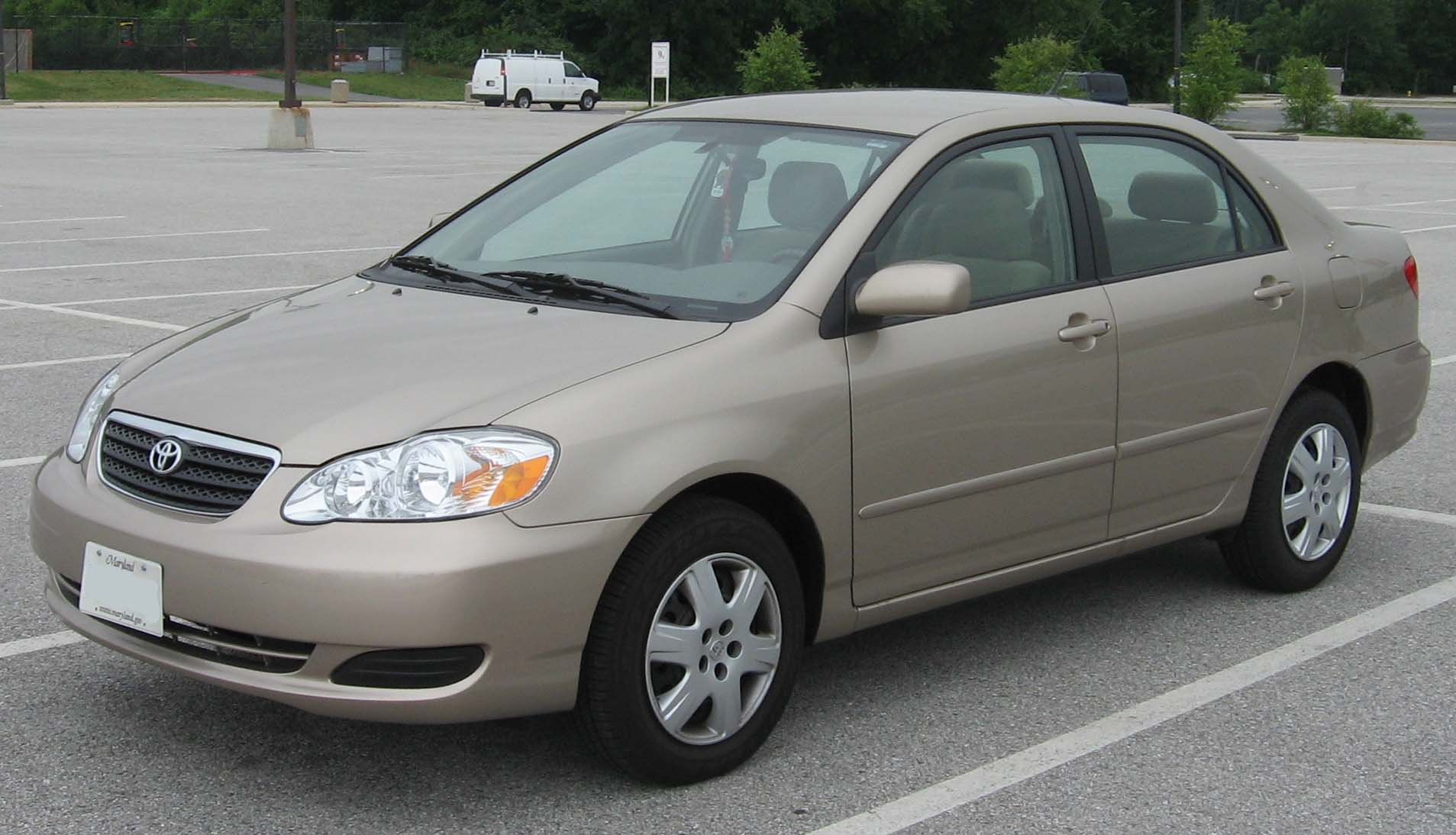
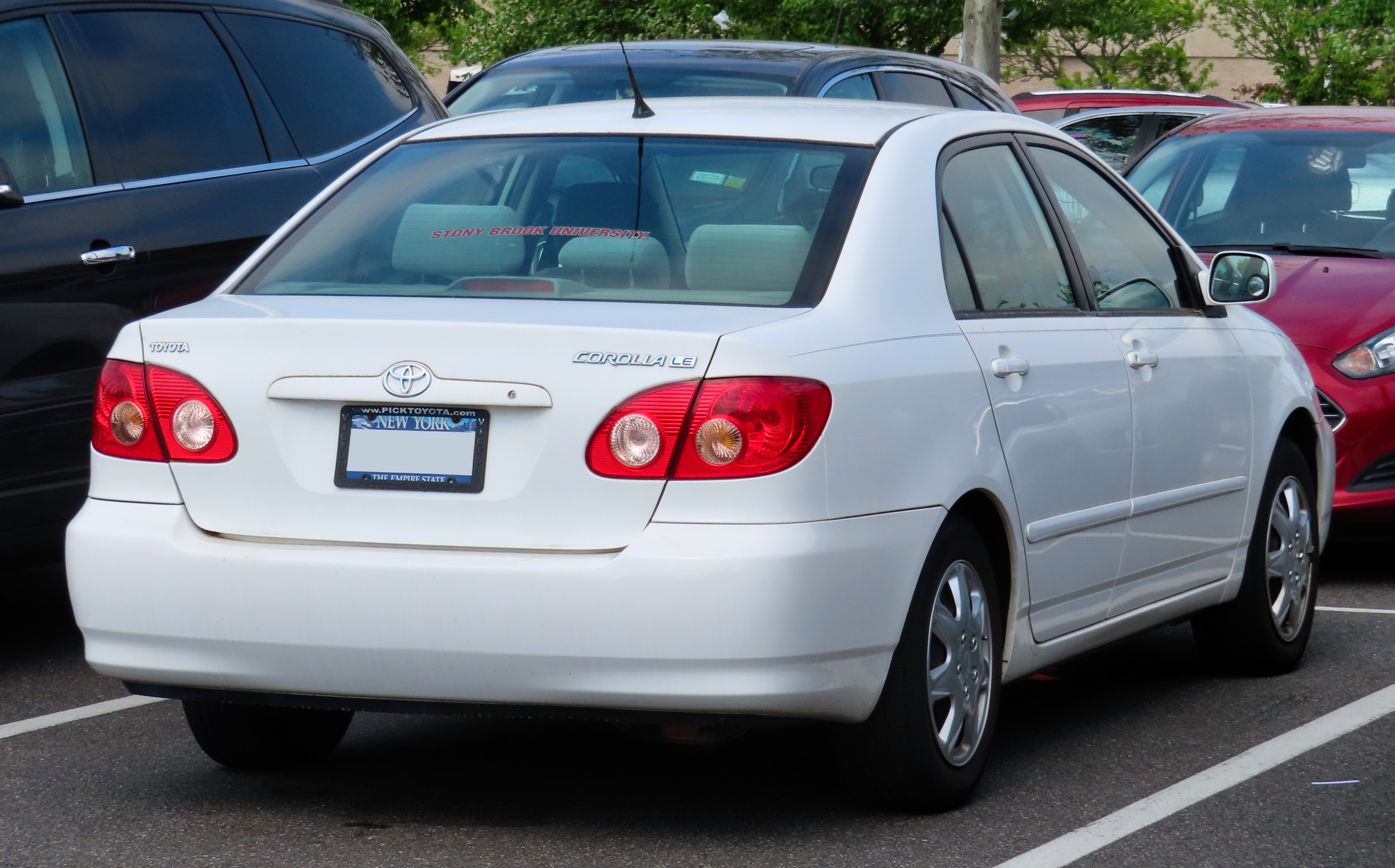
2005–2008 Toyota Corolla LE (US)

In 2004, for the 2005 model year, the exterior styling was refreshed with revised front bumper and grille, clear rear turn signal lenses, and updated wheel covers for the CE and LE trims. Interior differences include white on black Optitron gauges for the LE trim, a rear center headrest, and an updated radio head unit. Certain models were updated with Electronic Throttle Bodies and an Anti-Lock Braking System. The Manual transmission was dropped for the CE and LE trims, and was only available on the S.

This was the first generation of the Corolla to be available in Mexico, and was offered in 3 trim levels: the base CE, the mid-range LE and S, the latter the only trim to offer a manual transmission.

The base CE or "Classic Edition" trim came standard with manual windows and locks, but was available with optional power windows and locks. The mid-range LE or "Luxury Edition" came with blue gauge faces with dark blue numbers and orange needles. It was also fitted with mock-wood interior accents. Some models came with a 2-compartment centre console and leather seats. On the exterior, the LE and above models came with colour-keyed mirrors and door guards, and blacked out B-pillars. 15-inch 6 spoke Alloy wheels were optional, as well as a rear spoiler. The S or "Sport" trim adds side skirts, front and rear ground effects, a rear spoiler, and 15-inch 6 spoke aluminium alloy wheels as standard. Some models were available with blacked out headlight housings. On the interior, the colour scheme is changed to black, with subtle chrome accents. The S trim also adds a gauge set with white numbers and red markings and needles for a sporty appearance.

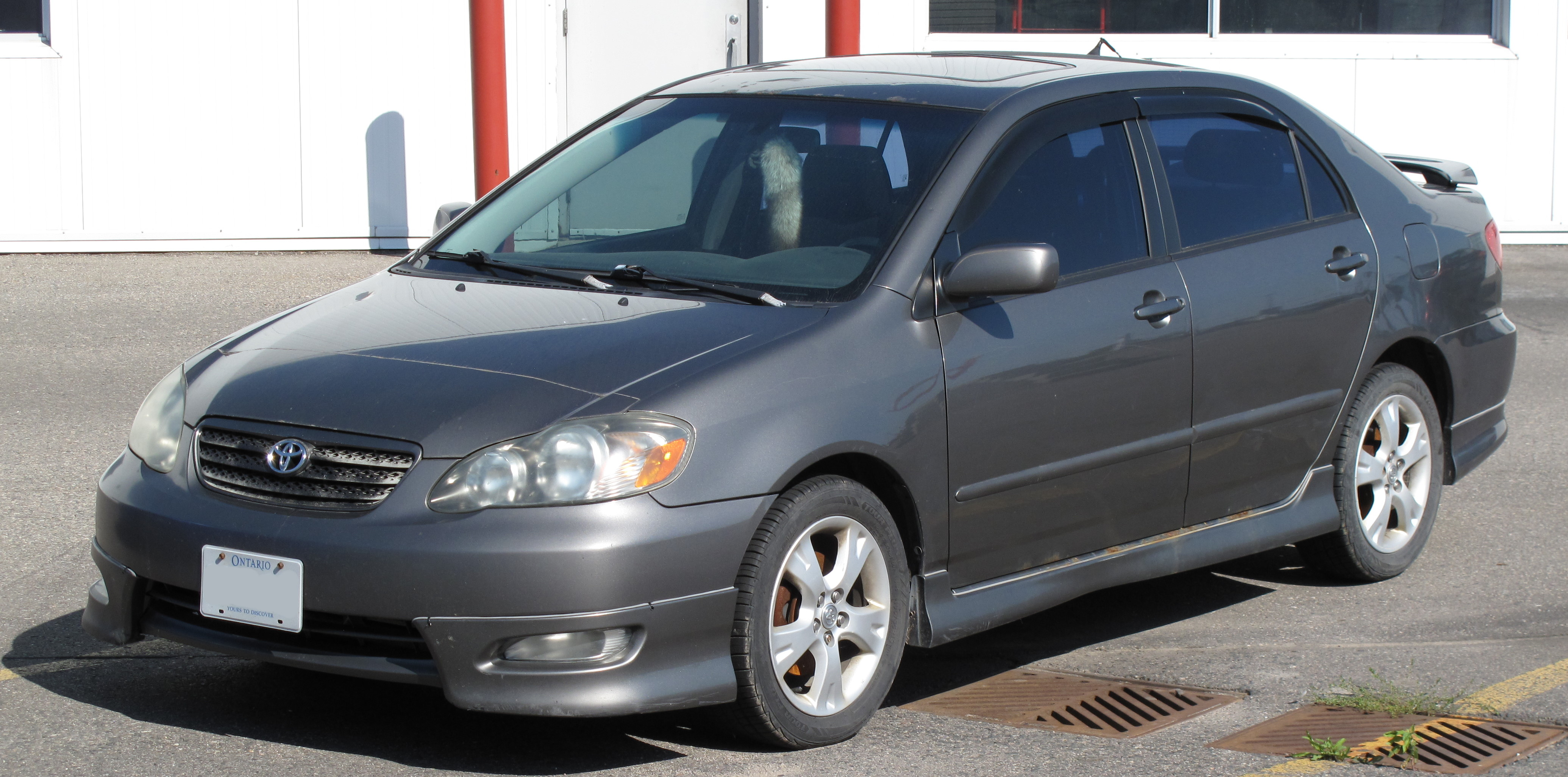
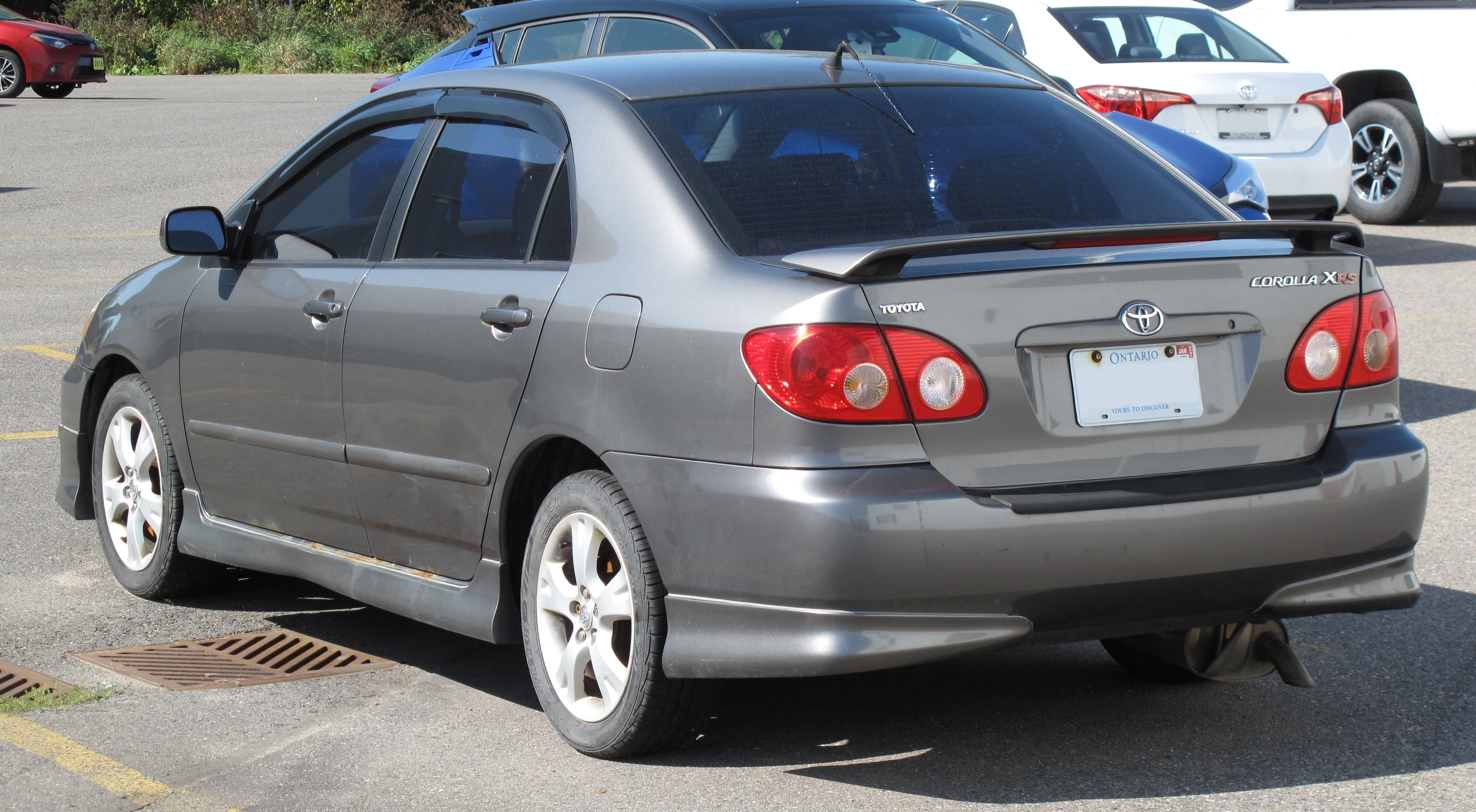
2006 Toyota Corolla XRS (US)

Shown as a concept in November 2003, a sporty XRS model (ZZE131), introduced in 2004 between the 2005 and 2006 model years only, featured the high-revving 127 kW (170 bhp) at 7,600 rpm, 172 N⋅m (127 lb⋅ft) at 4,400 rpm 2ZZ-GE engine and 6-speed manual from the Toyota Celica GT-S and Lotus Elise. The 2ZZ-GE motor was developed with collaboration from Yamaha Motor Corporation (like other wide-angle head GE, GTE, and GZE Toyota engines), and uses similar technologies found in its sibling motor the 1ZZ-FE. The XRS was very similar to its Corolla S cousin in appearance, however there are significant changes to the mechanical components. The 2ZZ-GE uses a cable throttle (unlike the electronic throttle control of the 2ZZ-GE in the later years of the Celica GT-S) with a lift set-point at 6,700 rpm and an 8,200 rpm redline. The close ratio C60 6-speed manual transmission (also found in the Toyota Matrix XRS) was the only transmission available. The sport-tuned suspension lowered the Corolla XRS by 12.7 millimetres (0.5 in). A Yamaha designed brace spans the front strut towers as well as a X-brace for the rear towers. The steering column is thicker and the power steering system is unique.

The rear drum brakes from the S (and other Corolla trims) were replaced with the drum-in-disc brakes from the Celica GT-S and the ABS system was upgraded to a four-channel with EBD (Electronic Brakeforce Distribution). Absent are Traction Control and Stability Control Systems (VSC). The Corolla XRS was given 5 spoke 16-inch painted aluminium alloy wheels (similar to the Matrix) and Michelin Pilot Primacy P195/55-R16 summer performance tires, equipped with a Tire Pressure Monitoring System (TPMS). The wheels are the most noticeable difference in exterior appearance from the Corolla S that features 6-spoke 15-inch alloy wheels. Other exterior differences being the key coloured grille surround (other trims have chrome), XRS badge at the back, rear discs, and a slightly lowered appearance.

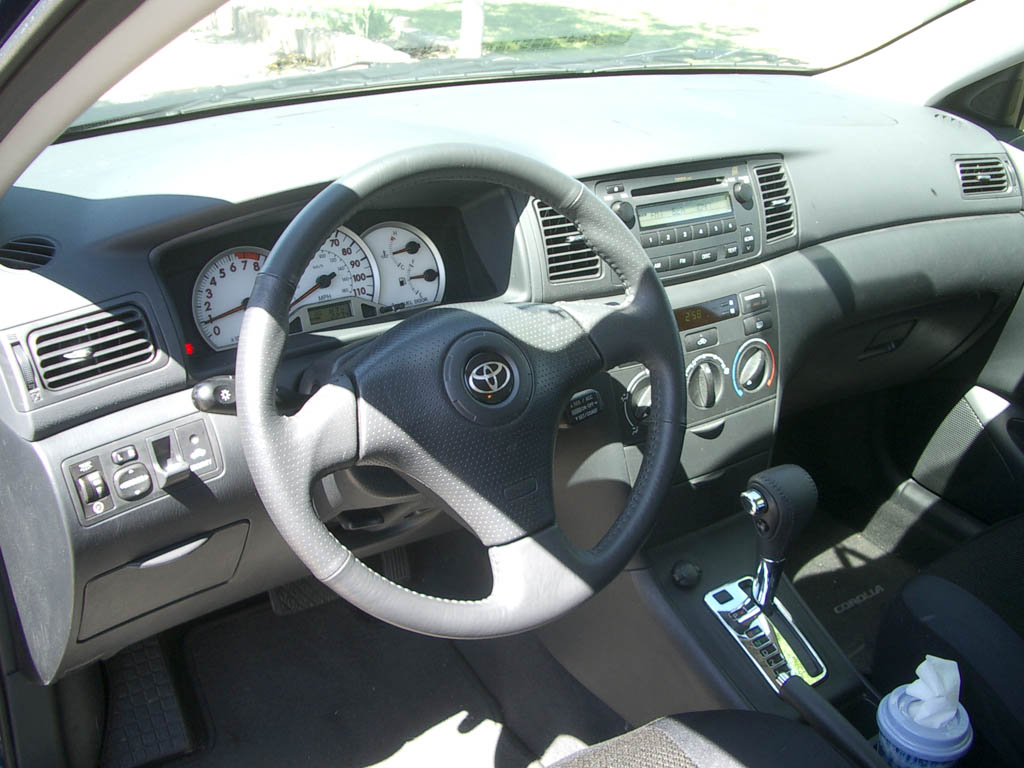
Interior of 2005–2008 Toyota Corolla S (US)

The interior features a three-spoke leather wrapped steering wheel from the Celica, leather shift knob, and leather shift boot from the Matrix XRS. Optitron gauges like those found in Lexus vehicles replaced the standard red-on-white gauges of the Corolla S. The interior has dark blue plastic with silver accenting and beige pillars from the bottom of the windows to the beige headliner. The dashboard is black. The front seats were replaced with manually adjustable sports seats with more side bolstering. The 4 main seats are black cloth with a blue hexagon pattern and black cloth sides. The front floor mats are from the Corolla S. Due to the rear X-brace, the rear seats do not fold 60-40 like those found in the other Corolla trims. Colour choices for the Corolla XRS were Super White II, Silver Streak Mica, Phantom Gray Pearl, Black Sand Pearl, Impulse Red Pearl, and Indigo Ink Pearl.

The Corolla XRS was on sale in the United States, Canada, and Puerto Rico. Toyota estimated to sell approximately 5,000 Corolla XRS per year. Production numbers have not been released, however it has been speculated that less than 7,000 were produced (unofficially estimated at 6,619 units). Unofficially, Toyota Canada has disclosed that 818 were sold MY (model year) 2005 and only 279 MY 2006, bringing a total of 1,097 Corolla XRS being sold in the country over the 2 model years. This limited production and minimal exterior differences resulted in the Corolla XRS being a unique sleeper hiding among the extremely common Corolla S and is the final outright performance designed model from Toyota that was targeted towards "single male buyers" before the complete switch to the Toyotas' Scion youth oriented brand.

The E140 Corolla XRS introduced for the 2009 model year as a successor used the 2.4L 2AZ-FE from the Toyota Camry and Scion tC and was available with a 5-speed manual or 5-speed automatic. While the 2009 Corolla XRS caters to a greater range of customers with the option of an automatic transmission, it is significantly slower than the previous generation and although its design intentions are similar, it is a different car from the original 2005 and 2006 Corolla XRS.

To commemorate 20 years of building Toyota Corolla in Canada, Toyota Canada offered the 20th Anniversary Edition Corolla CE for the 2008 model year, which includes power door locks with keyless entry, cruise control, power windows with driver's side auto down, special edition badging, aluminium alloy wheels and power sunroof.

North American market engines:

- 2002–2008 — 1ZZ-FE – 1.8 L (1794 cc) I4, 16-valve DOHC, FI, VVT-i, 130 hp (97 kW) – CE, LE, S (TRD 1.8 L Supercharger is available for this engine)
- 2005, 2006 – 2ZZ-GE – 1.8 L (1796 cc) I4, 16-valve DOHC, FI, VVTL-i, 170 hp (127 kW) – XRS

=== South America ===
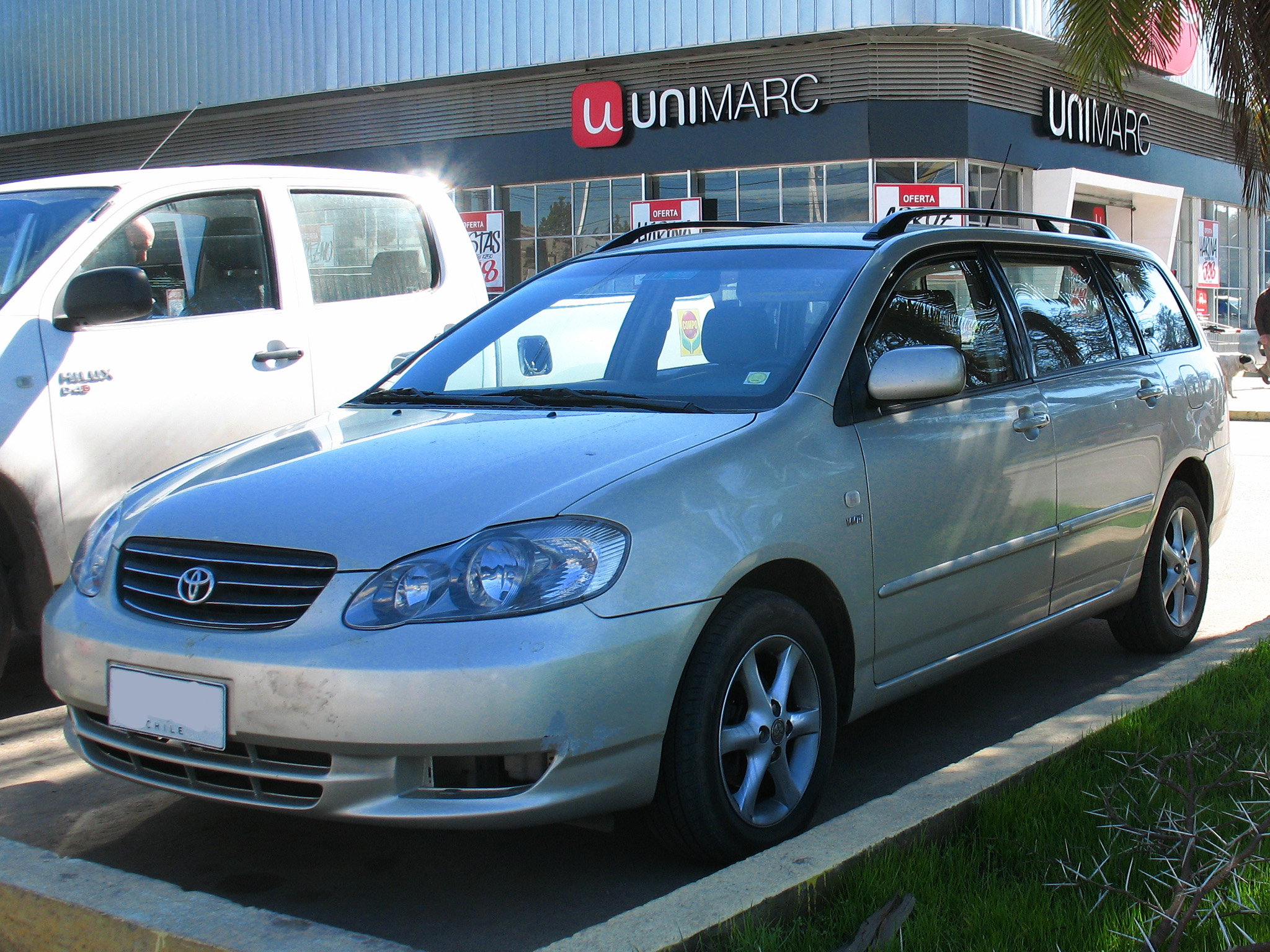
2006 Toyota Corolla Fielder (Chile)

In Brazil, the Corolla sedan and the Corolla Fielder wagon are built locally. It is available with the 1.6L 3ZZ-FE engine (sedan only) and the 1.8L 1ZZ-FE. The sedan is externally identical to both US and ASEAN (Altis) models, but the Fielder has different styling from the Japanese version. Starting from the 2008 model (released May 2007), the 1.8L 1ZZ-FBE engine has flexible-fuel technology. Unlike most other flexible-fuel vehicles in Brazilian market, the Corolla Flex has the same power ratings either with ethanol or petrol.

== Safety ==
Euro NCAP test results* 5-door Corolla hatchback (2002)
Test	Score	Rating
Adult occupant:	28	4 /5 stars
Pedestrian:	11	2 /4 stars

In the US, the 2003 model year Corolla scored moderately in crash tests with cumulative scores being around 7/10. However, it has been marred with an array of questionable safety concerns post launch. There were multiple lawsuits primarily due to unintended acceleration and weak subframe rigidity.

The 2003 model year Corolla was also one among the many vehicles in the centre of the Toyota Safety Controversy where the company was accused of manipulating or falsifying safety inspection results. This has led to many questioning the safety pedigree of the Corolla.

ANCAP test results* Toyota Corolla 5 door hatch with driver airbag (2001)
Test	Score
Overall	4 /5 stars
Frontal offset	11.33/16
Side impact	16/16
Pole	Not Assessed
Seat belt reminders	0/3
Whiplash protection	Not Assessed
Pedestrian protection	Marginal
Electronic stability control	Not Assessed
