= 2010 Australian Rally Championship =

Seasons
- ← 2009 2011 →

The 2010 Australian Rally Championship was series of six rallying events held across Australia, including the international event 2010 International Rally of Queensland. It was the 43rd season in the history of the competition.

Husband and wife team Simon and Sue Evans won their fourth Australian Rally Championship in five years. Driving their own privately prepared Subaru Impreza the duo became the first pair to win the Championship in vehicles of three different manufacturers.

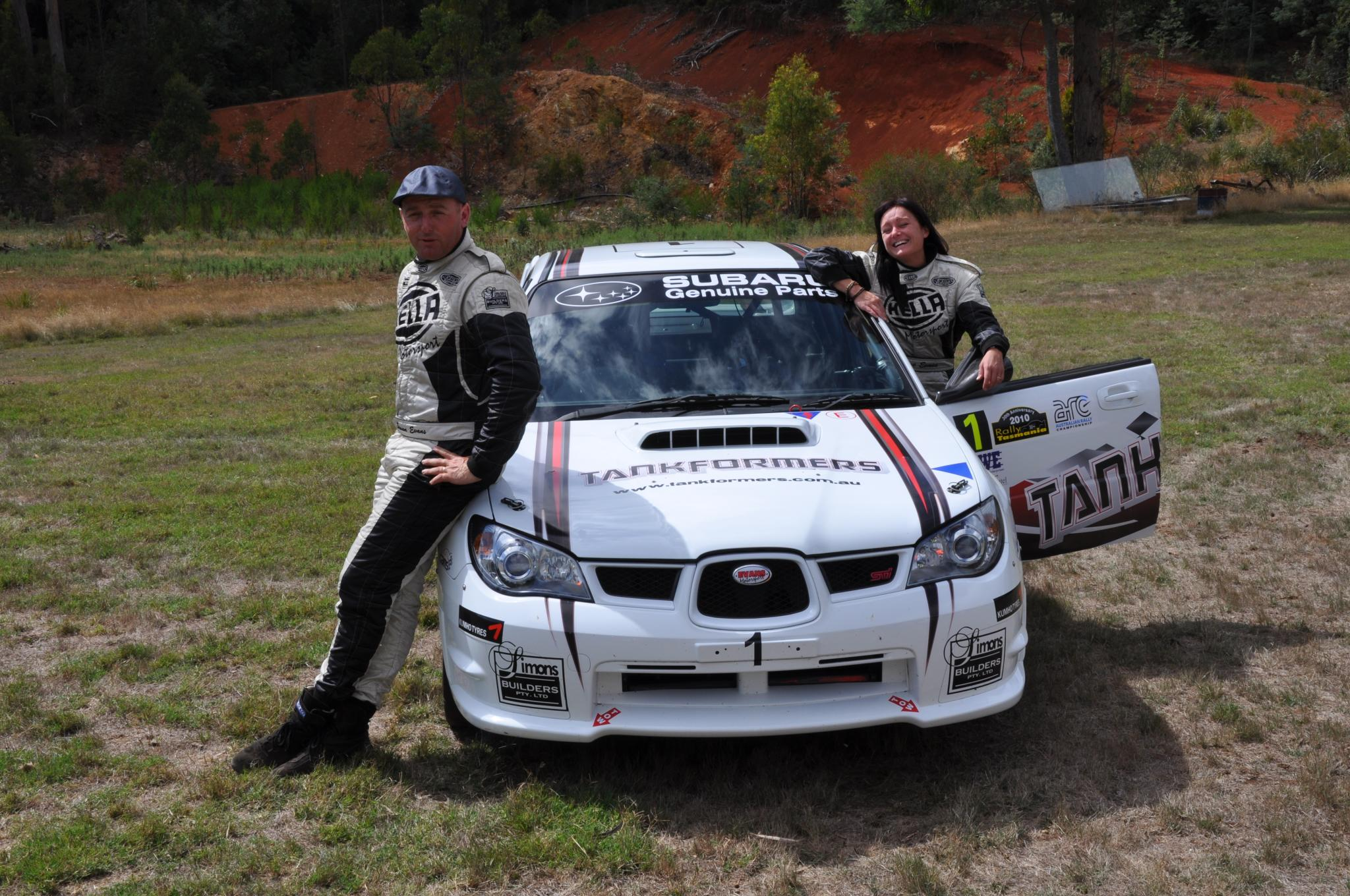
Simon and Sue Evans in Tasmania.

== Season review ==
After winning the 2009 championship in a Mitsubishi the Evans returned in 2010 with a Subaru, while after a several year lay-off the Pedder brothers in a two car team of Mitsubishis. Scott Pedder was instantly competitive, winning the opening round of the series, the all-tarmac Rally Tasmania. Simon Evans and his brother Eli, driving a JAS Motorsport built Honda Civic Type-R, shared the second places. With the dirt-surface season commencing with the Forest Rally, Peddar won both heats again from Evans. Former factory Ford rallyist Darren Windus making a one-off appearance at his home event in a Toyota and Ryan Smart, also Toyota mounted shared the third places. Next the Australian Championship returned to Coffs Harbour when Simon Evans won his first Heat for the year and backed it up immediately. Pedder was second in Heat 1 but rolled out of the rally in Heat 2. Mitsubishi driver Nathan Quinn finished second in Heat 2, with Smart taking a pair of thirds.

At Rally SA Evans won Heat 1 from Pedder and Mitsubishi driver Justin Dowel, but Heat 2 saw Evans win unopposed as an accident took Pedder out of the rally and the championship. While co-driver John Mortimer was largely unhurt, Pedder sustained a knee and ankle injuries ruling him out of a return to the championship in 2010. Evans won the heat from Quinn and Eli Evans.

Evans won the International Rally of Queensland, the ARCs annual get-together with the Asia-Pacific Rally Championship. Glen Raymond was second in a Mitsubishi with Mark Pedder third. The victory was enough for Evans to secure his fourth championship. Reymond struck back at his home event when Evans and Pedder stuck trouble and the Mitsubishi driver raced home to take a popular win Rally Victoria. Fellow Mitsubishi drivers Justin Dowel and Mark Pedder finished second and third. The podium finish for Pedder allowed him to tie on points with Ryan Smart for runner's up in the championship. The countback worked in Smart's favour giving him and sister Rebecca Smart second place in the title.

Scott Pedder still had enough points to finish fourth in the title, four points ahead of Queensland Mitsubishi driver Steven Shepheard. Glen Raymond and Eli Evans all finished the season within ten points of Scott Peddar.

Mitsubishi won the manufacturers title, 444 points to Subaru's 432. Eli Evans in the Honda took out the two-wheel drive title convincingly. Mitsubishi driver Michael Boaden won the Privateer's Cup.

== The Rallies ==
The 2010 season featured six rallies.

Round	Rally	Date
1	Rally Tasmania	26–28 February
2	Quit Forest Rally	16–18 April
3	Coffs Coast Rally	14–16 May
4	Scouts Rally SA	24–26 June
5	International Rally of Queensland	31 July–1 August
6	Rally Victoria	13 November

== Teams & Drivers ==
The following are the competitors from the 2010 ARC season.

Team	Vehicle	Number	Driver	Co-driver	Class
Evans Motorsport	Subaru Impreza WRX STI	1	Simon Evans	Sue Evans	Group N
Evans Motorsport	Honda Civic Type R	3	Eli Evans	Glen Weston	PRC
Raymond Partners Accounting	Mitsubishi Lancer Evo X	2	Glen Raymond	Matt Raymond	Group N
Activ Rallysport	Mitsubishi Lancer Evo IX	4	Justin Dowel	Matt Lee	PRC
OzTec Suspension	Mitsubishi Lancer Evo X	5	Steven Shepheard	John McCarthy	PRC
Yandina Automotive Repairs	Toyota Corolla Sportivo	6	Ryan Smart	Rebecca Smart	Group N P
Pedders Suspension	Mitsubishi Lancer Evo IX	7	Scott Pedder	Jonathan Mortimer	Group N
Pedders Suspension	Mitsubishi Lancer Evo IX	8	Mark Pedder	Catherine Smallbone	PRC
Wauchope Motors	Mitsubishi Lancer Evo IX	9	Michael Boaden	Helen Cheers	PRC
Speedie Contractors	Toyota Corolla Sportivo	10	Simon Knowles	Margot Knowles	Group N P
Fullerton Financial Services	Mitsubishi Lancer Evo IX	11	Bruce Fullerton	Hugh Reardon-Smith	PRC
Daikin and Allied Air Conditioning	Mitsubishi Lancer Evo IX	12	Nathan Quinn	David Green	Group N
Hand Shield	Mitsubishi Mirage	13	Barry Kirk	Daniel Wilson	PRC
Groundforce Truck Rentals	Toyota Corolla S2000	14	Darren Windus	John Allen	Super 2000
Secure Glass	Subaru Impreza WRX STI	15	Roman Watkins	Toni Feaver	PRC
Busselton Subaru Service	Subaru Impreza WRX	16	Leigh Hynes	Stuart Percival	Group N
Wendys Bunbury Forum	Subaru Impreza WRX STI	19	Tom Wilde	Nerralie Wilde	PRC
Mark Fawcett Motorsport	Subaru Impreza WRX Spec C	20	Mark Fawcett	Simon Ellis	PRC
SaabCare Motorsport Services	Mitsubishi Lancer Evo VII	21	Mike Bailey	Caitlin Earley	PRC
Allquip Australia	Ford Fiesta	21	Barney Hogan	Darren Grainger	Super 2000
John Berne	Subaru Impreza RS	22	John Berne	Tony Best	PRC
North Oz Projects	Holden Commodore SS	27	Jacob Bruinsma	Lisa White	Group N
Hyundai Motor Company Australia	Hyundai i30 CRDi	30	Mick Gillett	Harvey Smith	PRC
Rallyschool	Mitsubishi Lancer Evo VII	32	Charlie Drake	Eoin Moynihan	PRC

== Drivers Championship ==
Pointscore as follows.

Pos	Driver	Tas			Forest		Coffs		SA		Qld			Victoria	Total
Pos	Driver	Heat1	Heat2	Heat3	Heat1	Heat2	Heat1	Heat2	Heat1	Heat2	Heat1	Heat2	Heat3	Victoria	Total
1	Simon Evans	15	34	15	34	34	40	41	40	41	20	21	40	20	395
2	Ryan Smart	10	22	9	26	30	30	30	Ret	DNS	13	Ret	Ret	65	235
3	Mark Pedder	9	26	8	6	9	9	12	7	18	11	15	30	75	235
4	Scott Pedder	20	40	21	40	41	34	Ret	34	Ret					230
5	Steven Shepheard	7	20	7	9	16	26	9	22	26	9	7	18	50	226
6	Glen Raymond	13	Ret	13	10	18	Ret	DNS			17	17	34	100	222
7	Eli Evans	17	16	17	5	14	12	Ret	20	30	10	13	26	40	220
8	Justin Dowel	11	30	11	16	6			30	Ret	15	Ret	Ret	85	204
9	Michael Boaden				14	10	22	26	18	22	8	11	22	45	198
10	Bruce Fullerton	5	14	5			20	22	14	16	6	9	16	35	162
11	Nathan Quinn				22	22	Ret	34	26	34	Ret	DNS	Ret		138
12	Barry Kirk	3	10	4	7	7	8	14	8	9	4	5	10	15	104
13	Mick Gillett						14	16	9	10	5	5	14	22.5	95.5
14	Mark Fawcett	8	8	6					16	20	7	10	20		95
15	Simon Knowles	4	12	5	8	8	18	10	Ret	14	Ret	8	Ret		87
16	John Berne						16	18	10	12	5	Ret	Ret	25	86
17	Mike Bailey						10	20	12	Ret	Ret	6	Ret	30	78
18	Leigh Hynes				18	Ret	Ret	Ret						55	73
19	Darren Windus				30	26									56
20	Jacob Bruinsma										4	4	12	17.5	37.5
21	Charlie Drake	6	18	10			Ret	DNS							34
=22	Roman Watkins				12	20	Ret	Ret							32
=22	Tom Wilde				20	12									32
24	Barney Hogan	4	9	4											17
