= 2008 Australian Rally Championship =

Road motor rally competition

Seasons
- ← 2007 2009 →

The 2008 Australian Rally Championship Season is the 41st Season in the history of the competition. This year once again there will be 6 classes in the competition and over 50 official drivers and 48 teams.

== The Rallies ==
The 2008 Season has once again featured a total of 6 Rallies across Australia starting at the QUIT Rally until the final event at Coffs Harbour.

Round	Rally	Date
1	QUIT Forest Rally	5–6 April
2	Rally of Canberra	10–11 May
3	Coates Rally Queensland	21–22 June
4	Sprints Auto Parts RallySA	26–27 July
5	T.A.S Tarmac Challenge	4–5 October
6	Coffs Coast Rally	15–16 November

== Teams & Drivers ==
Officially, this season, there will be only one factory-built team competing in the competition. This will be the TTR (Toyota Team Racing) Team. They win the Manufacturer's title for the 3rd consecutive season by default, this is due to the Ford-based Focus RS team of last season pulling out and instead deciding to field a Subaru and changed their Name to PIRTEK LWR Rally Team.

There are other manufacturers competing as Privateer teams which don't represent the manufacturer unlike the TTR team which represents Toyota, such as the Evans Motorsport Team which uses a Subaru but isn't backed by the manufacturer. All in all, there will be over 50 drivers competing across numerous classes. The Super 2000 class will once again be the Top-Category which is followed by the Group N and the Privateers competition which sees privately owned teams competing.

Team	Manufacturer	Number	Driver	Co-driver	Class
TTR	Toyota	1	Simon Evans	Sue Evans	Super 2000
TTR	Toyota	2	Neal Bates	Coral Taylor	Super 2000
Simon Evans Motorsport	Subaru	3	Eli Evans	Chris Murphy	Group N
Pirtek LWR Rally Team	Subaru	4	Michael Guest	David Green	Group N
Japanese Wholesales Spares	Ford	5	Darren Windus	Jon Mortimer	Super 2000
Access Hardware	Mitsubishi	6	Spencer Lowndes	Chris Randall	Group N
Raymond Partner Accountants	Toyota	7	Glen Raymond	Matt Raymond	Group NP
Daikin Motorsport	Mitsubishi		Nathan Quinn	Craig Jones	Privateers
Driver Skills Australia	Subaru	15	Mark Butcher	Lisa White	Privateers
Fusion Motorsport	Subaru		Mitchell Hall		Privateers
Dennis Dunlop Racing	Mitsubishi		Dennis Dunlop	Jacqueline Dunlop	Privateers
Ralliart	Mitsubishi		Molly Taylor		Privateers
Activ Rallyesport	Mitsubishi	10	Justin Dowel	Lisa White	Privateers
KME Rally Sport	Mitsubishi		Brendon Kaitler	Vivek Samy	Privateers
Kipling's Bakery Point Wakefield	Mitsubishi		Brett Kipling	Darren Masters	Privateers
Fullerton Financial Services	Mitsubishi	11	Bruce Fullerton	Hugh Reardon-Smith	Privateers
Fullerton Financial Services	Mitsubishi	12	Ryan Smart	Rebecca Smart	Privateers
Australian Plastic Profiles	Mitsubishi		David Hills	David Callaghan	Privateers
Secure Glass Racing	Subaru		Roman Watkins	Toni Feaver	Privateers
GSA Motorsport	Mitsubishi		Steven Stepheard	Tom Smith	Privateers
Redline Oil	Subaru	17	Alex Stone	Dianna Madlener	Privateers
RMS Service Centre	Subaru	19	Leigh Hynes	Stuart Percival	Privateers
Oz2000 Rallyesport	Volkswagen		Marius Swart	Gerard McConkey	Privateers
Barry Kirk Rallying	Mazda	14	Barry Kirk	Jahmeil Taylor	F16
Molly Taylor Rallysport	Mitsubishi	22	Molly Taylor		F16
SR Automotive	Toyota		Stewart Reid	John Allen	Privateers
Rally Power Motorsport	Daihatsu		James Rodda	Naomi Tillet	F16
Marlin Australia	Holden		John Murray Senior	Jeffrey Stevens	Aussie Cup
Cullen Motorsport	Ford		Ben Cullen	Mathew Cullen	F16
Houghton Team Racing	Subaru		Richard Houghton	Andrew Houghton	Privateers

== 2008 Rallies ==
- see: 2008 Rally of WA
- see: 2008 International Rally of Canberra

== Broadcasting ==
The series will once again be broadcast on the Australian channel, Channel 10 which will have a 1-hour magazine-type show on Sunday afternoons, on the same week as the events are actually taking place and concluding. All of the events will be broadcast between 12 p.m. and 1 p.m on Sunday.

== Drivers Championship ==
Pos	Driver	Team	Car	Forest		Canberra		Queensland		RallySA		T.A.S.		Coffs Coast		Total
Pos	Driver	Team	Car	Heat1	Heat2	Heat1	Heat2	Heat1	Heat2	Heat1	Heat2	Heat1	Heat2	Heat1	Heat2	Total
1	Neal Bates	Toyota Racing Developments	Toyota Corolla S2000	34	40	40	34	40	31	34	30	40	41	27	27	418
2	Eli Evans	Simon Evans Motorsport	Subaru Impreza WRX	22	30	34		30	40	30	40			51	60	337
3	Simon Evans	Toyota Racing Developments	Toyota Corolla S2000	40	1	30	40			40	35	30	34	60	7.5	318.5
4	Spencer Lowndes	Access Hardware	Mitsubishi Lancer Evolution IX	12	26	22	26	20	26	26	26	34		33	33	284
5	Glen Raymond	Raymond Partner Accountants	Toyota Corolla Sportivo	10	22	20		12	22	22	14	22	30	21	51	246
6	Michael Guest	Pirtek LWR Rally Team	Subaru Impreza WRX	9	34		12	34	34			10	22	39		194
7	Justin Dowel	Activ Rallyesport	Mitsubishi Lancer Evolution IX	30	18		14		16	20	22			30	9	159
8	Dennis Dunlop	Dennis Dunlop Racing	Mitsubishi Lancer Evo VII				20			18	18	20	20	18	30	144
9	Nathan Quinn	Daikin Motorsport	Mitsubishi Lancer Evo V				9	22	20					45	45	141
10	Molly Taylor	Molly Taylor Rallysport; Ralliart	Mitsubishi Mirage; Mitsubishi Lancer Evolution IX			10		6	6	12	6	18	18	13.5	21	110.5
11	Ryan Smart	Fullerton Financial Services	Mitsubishi Lancer Evo VI			16	10	16	18					6	39	105
12	Darren Windus	Japanese Wholesales Spares	Ford Fiesta S2000	26	10	26	30									92
13	Brenton Kaitler	KME Rally Sport	Mitsubishi Lancer Evo VI	20	16							26	26			88
14	Barry Kirk	Barry Kirk Rallying	Mazda RX-7	14	12	5				6	7	12	12	4.5	6	78.5
15	John Berne		Subaru Impreza RS			9	7	9	8	9	9			9	13.5	73.5
16	Bruce Fullerton	Fullerton Financial Services	Mitsubishi Lancer Evo VI			18	16							15	24	73
17	Ben Cullen	Cullen Motorsport	Toyota Sprinter			7	5	8	7			16	14		12	69
17	Simon Knowles		Mitsubishi Lancer Evo VI					10	9	10	10			12	18	69
19	Richard HOughton	Houghton Team Racing	Subaru Impreza WRX			8	8			8	12			10.5	15	61.5
20	Mark Butcher	Driver Skills Australia	Subaru Impreza WRX	16	14							16	14			60
21	Matt van Tuinen		Subaru Impreza WRX							14	16			24		54
22	Steven Shepheard	GSA Motorsport	Mitsubishi Lancer Evo XI			14	22			16						52
23	David Hills	Australian Plastic Profiles	Mitsubishi Lancer Evolution IX				18	14	12							44
24	John V. Murray	Marlin Australia	Subaru Impreza WRX			6	4			7	8			7.5	10.5	43
25	Roman Watkins	Secure Glass Racing	Subaru Impreza WRX	18	20											38
26	Marius Swart	Oz2000 Rallyesport	Volkswagen Polo S2000			12	6	7	10							35
27	Brett Kipling	Kipling's Bakery Point Wakefield	Mitsubishi Lancer Evolution IX						14		20					34
28	Stewart Reid	SR Automotive	Toyota Corolla Sportivo					26								26
29	John Goasdoue		Mitsubishi Lancer Evo VI					18								18
30	Mitchell Hall		Subaru Impreza WRX							5						5
