= 2009 Australian Rally Championship =

Seasons
- ← 2008 2010 →

The 2009 Australian Rally Championship season is the 42nd season in the history of the competition.

It is also the first since the mid-1980s to take place with no significant manufacturer support after Toyota withdrew its support of the Bates Motor Sport rally team which has competed as Toyota Team Australia since the early 1990s. Toyota did fund the team's final appearance at the tarmac Rally Tasmania, but after that Neal Bates had to find other sources of funding for his Corolla. Simon Evans left the team, taking up the reins of a Mitsubishi Lancer Evolution IX under the banner of his own personal building business. Despite this setback, Evans and his wife Sue regained the title they had lost the previous year to their now former boss. Bates could only manage third in the title, finishing behind one of the Corollas he had previously built to the Group N+ regulations, driven by an ever-consistent Glen Raymond. Evans younger brother Eli slipped to fourth in the standings after beating Simon into second position last year.

== The Rallies ==
The 2009 season featured six rallies, the first five of which contribute to the drivers' title. The sixth, the newly reinstated Rally Australia, will contribute only to the manufacturers standings.

Round	Rally	Date
1	Rally Tasmania	13–15 February
2	Rally of Canberra	7–8 March
3	Quit Forest Rally	3–5 April
4	Rally Queensland	9–10 May
5	Sprints Auto Parts Rally SA	31 July – 2 August
6	Repco Rally Australia	3–6 September

== Teams & Drivers ==
The following are the competitors from the 2009 ARC season.

Team	Manufacturer	Number	Driver	Co-driver	Class
Bates Motor Sport	Toyota	1	Neal Bates	Coral Taylor	Super 2000
Bates Motor Sport	Toyota	3	Simon Evans	Sue Evans	Super 2000
Tankformers	Subaru	2	Eli Evans	Chris Murphy	Group N
Simons Builders	Mitsubishi	3	Simon Evans	Sue Evans	Group N
Spencer Lowndes	Mitsubishi	4	Spencer Lowndes	Chris Randell	Group N
Raymond Partner Accounting	Toyota	5	Glen Raymond	Matt Raymond	Group N P
Maximum Motorsport	Subaru	6	Dean Herridge	Glen Weston	Group N
Activ Rallysport	Mitsubishi	7	Justin Dowel	Matt Lee	PRC
Les Walkden Rallying	Subaru	8	Brendan Reeves	Rhianon Smyth	Group N
Wauchope Motors	Subaru	9	Michael Boaden	Helen Cheers	PRC
Kumhyo Tyres	Subaru	10	Tony Sullens	Julia Barkley	PRC
OzTec Suspension	Mitsubishi	11	Steven Shepheard	John McCarthy	PRC
Kiplings Bakery	Mitsubishi	12	Brett Kipling	Darren Masters	PRC
Nathan Quinn	Mitsubishi	12	Nathan Quinn	David Green	Group N
Total Motorsport	Subaru	12	Craig Brooks	Tony Jackson	Group N
Matt van Tuinen	Subaru	14	Matt van Tuinen	Daniel Wilson	PRC
Fullerton Financial Services	Mitsubishi	16	Bruce Fullerton	Hugh Reardon-Smith	PRC
Fullerton Financial Services	Mitsubishi	19	Ryan Smart	Rebecca Smart	PRC
Allquip Australia	Ford	17	Barney Hogan	Darren Grainger	Group N
Marlin Australia	Subaru	24	John Murray Senior	Bob Selby-Wood	PRC
Barry Kirk Rallying	Mazda; Mitsubishi	32	Barry Kirk	Lisa Reed White	

== Drivers Championship ==
Pos	Driver	Team	Car	Tasmania			Canberra		Forest		Qld		RallySA		Total
Pos	Driver	Team	Car	Heat1	Heat2	Heat3	Heat1	Heat2	Heat1	Heat2	Heat1	Heat2	Heat1	Heat2	Total
1	Simon Evans	Bates Motor Sport; Simon's Builders	Toyota Corolla S2000; Mitsubishi Lancer Evolution IX	17	34	20	40	41		34	40	41	60	52.5	379.5
2	Glen Raymond	Raymond Partner Accountants	Toyota Corolla Sportivo	11	26	11	30	26	40	30	34	34	51	45	338
3	Neal Bates	Bates Motor Sport	Toyota Corolla S2000	20	40	18	34	34	12	41	30	31	12		272
4	Eli Evans	Tankformers	Subaru Impreza WRX	15	30	15			34	22	26		45	60	247
5	Justin Dowel	Activ Rallysport	Mitsubishi Lancer Evolution IX	8	14	8	26	30	26		20	18	39	24	213
6	Steven Shepheard	OzTec Suspension	Mitsubishi Lancer Evo X				12	22	18	18	16	14	30	39	169
7	Ryan Smart	Fullerton Financial Services	Mitsubishi Lancer Evo VI						22	20	22	22	33	27	146
8	Brett Kipling	Kipling's Bakery	Mitsubishi Lancer Evolution IX				20	20	20				27	33	120
9	Simon Knowles	Speedie Contractors	Mitsubishi Lancer Evo VI						16	16	12	12	10.5	21	87.5
10	John Berne	Beecroft Dental Centre	Subaru Impreza RS				16	10			9	9	21	18	83
11	Dean Herridge	Maximum Motorsport	Subaru Impreza WRX	9	20	9			10	26					74
12	Brendan Reeves	Les Walkden Rallying	Subaru Impreza WRX	13	22	10					7	20			72
13	Matt van Tuinen	Matt van Tuinen	Subaru Impreza WRX								18	16	7.5	30	71.5
14	Cameron Sluce	Cameron Sluce	Subaru Impreza RS				18	12			10	10			50
15	Barry Kirk	Barry Kirk Rallying	Mazda RX-7; Mitsubishi Mirage			6					6	7	15	12	46
16	Luke Page	Rally Development Racing	Hyundai Excel									8	18	15	41
17	Nathan Quinn	Nathan Quinn	Mitsubishi Lancer Evolution IX								14	26	20		40
18	Michael Boaden	Wauchope Motors	Subaru Impreza WRX				22	18							40
19	Spencer Lowndes	Spencer Lowndes	Mitsubishi Lancer Evolution IX	10	16	13									39
20	Richard HOughton	Houghton Team Racing	Subaru Impreza WRX				14	14			5				33
21	John V. Murray	Marlin Australia	Subaru Impreza WRX								8		9	13.5	30.5
22	Darren Windus	Groundforce Truck Rentals	Toyota Corolla S2000						30						30
23	Tony Sullens	Kumho Tyres	Subaru Impreza WRX	5	18	7									30
24	Barney Hogan	Allquip Australia	Ford Fiesta	6									13.5	10.5	30
25	Jack Flanagan	Bisous	Nissan Sunny						14	14					28
26	Bruce Fullerton	Fullerton Financial Services	Mitsubishi Lancer Evo VI										24		24
27	Charlie Drake	Claddagh Civil	Mitsubishi Lancer Evo VIII					16							16
28	Craig Brooks	Total Motorsport	Subaru Impreza WRX	7											7
