= 2008 Rally of WA =

The 2008 Australian Rally Championship Rally of WA was held in, around and near the town of Nannup, Western Australia. 20 stages were featured in the Rally and it was won for the 6th time by Toyota Team Racing driver, Neal Bates.

== Results ==
The rally commenced at Busselton with 2 special stages. It then moved across through Kinky, Ferndale, Ellis, Healthway before returning to Nannup, Western Australia at the end of the First Leg. The 2nd Leg started once again at Busselton before moving to Brockman(A stage for the Targa Rally) and repeating the Heathlway and Ellis stages before finally finishing the 2 day rally at Hellium.

LEG ONE

Pos.	Driver	Class	Time	Time Behind	Points
1	Simon EVANS	Super 2000	01:05:50.7	00:00.0	40
2	Neal BATES	Super 2000	01:07:18.9	01:28.2	34
3	Alex STONE	Privateer	01:09:36.1	03:45.4	
4	Justin DOWEL	Privateer	01:10:25.8	04:35.1	30
5	Darren WINDUS	Group N	01:12:08.4	06:17.7	26
6	Eli EVANS	Privateer	01:12:16.7	06:26.0	22
7	Brenton KAITLER	Privateer	01:12:37.9	06:47.2	20
8	Roman WATKINS	Privateer	01:15:22.5	09:31	18
9	Mark BUTCHER	Privateer	01:20:29.0	14:38.3	16
10	Barry KIRK	F16	01:35:13.1	29:22.4	14
11	Spencer LOWNDES	Group N	01:12:06.7	00:00.0	12
12	Glen RAYMOND	Group N	02:24:04.9	00:00.0	10
13	Michael GUEST	Group N	01:15:42.2	00:00.0	9

LEG TWO(FINISHING POSITIONS)

Pos.	Driver	Class	Time	Time Behind	Points
1	Neal BATES	Super 2000	01:07:04.8	00:00.0	40
2	Michael GUEST	Group N	01:07:14.8	00:10.0	34
3	Eli EVANS	Group N	01:07:59.1	00:54.3	30
4	Spencer LOWNDES	Group N	01:08:29.1	01:24.3	26
5	Glen RAYMOND	Group N	01:09:02.9	01:58.1	22
6	Roman WATKINS	Privateer	01:09:22.0	02:17.2	20
7	Alex STONE	Privateer	01:09:38.0	02:33.2	
8	Leigh HYNES	Privateer	01:11:34.7	04:29.9	
9	Justin DOWEL	Privateer	01:11:46.6	04:41.8	18
10	Brenton KAITLER	Privateer	01:12:12.8	05:08.0	16
11	Mark BUTCHER	Privateer	01:19:15.3	12:10.5	14
12	Barry KIRK	F16	01:38:34.5	31:29.7	12
13	Darren WINDUS	Group N	01:23:07.0	0:00.0	10
14	Simon Evans	Super 2000	00:34:45.3	00:00	1

== Points(Overall) ==
Driver	Class	Pts
Neal Bates	Super 2000	74
Eli Evans	Group N	52
Justin Dowell	Privateer	48
Micheal Guest	Group N	43
Simon Evans	Super 2000	41
Spencer Lowndes	Privateers	38
Roman Watkins	Privateer	38
Brenton Kaitler	Privateer	36
Darren Windus	Group N	36
Glen Raymond	Group N	32
Mark Butcher	Privateer	30
Barry Kirk	F16	26
