= 2011 Australian Rally Championship =

(2011) Aussie Rally, Queensland Rally

Seasons
- ← 2010 2012 →

The 2011 Australian Rally Championship is series of five rallying events held across Australia, including the World Rally Championship event, Rally Australia and Asia Pacific Rally Championship event, 2011 International Rally of Queensland. It is the 44th season in the history of the competition and the first in several decades to not feature any former champions.

Mitsubishi driver Justin Dowel leads the points race by 21 points over Toyota driver Ryan Smart. Both drivers broke through for their first Australian Rally Championship victories this season, Smart at the season opening Forest Rally, Dowell at the most recent event, Rally SA. The pair between them have won all Legs and Rallies. Mitsubishi driver Mark Pedder sits third in the points, 19 behind Smart, with a string of second placings contributing to the pointscore.

== The Rallies ==
The 2011 season featured five rallies, each held in a different state. Rally Australia returns to the calendar but Rally Tasmania and Coffs Coast Rally have been dropped.

Round	Rally	Date
1	Quit Forest Rally	15–17 April
2	International Rally of Queensland	13–15 May
3	Scouts Rally SA	29–31 July
4	Rally Australia	8–11 September
5	Rally Victoria	11–12 November

== Teams & Drivers ==
The following are the competitors from the 2011 ARC season.

Team	Vehicle	Number	Driver	Co-driver	Class
Smart Motorsport	Toyota Corolla Sportivo	2	Ryan Smart	John Allen	Group N P
Evans Motorsport	Honda Civic Type R	3	Eli Evans	Glen Weston	PRC
Activ Rallysport	Mitsubishi Lancer Evo IX	4	Justin Dowel	Matt Lee	ARC
GSA Wholesale Suspension	Mitsubishi Lancer Evo X	5	Steven Shepheard	John McCarthy	ARC
Pedders Suspension	Mitsubishi Lancer Evo IX	7	Mark Pedder	Lee Tierney	ARC
Driver Skills Australia	Subaru Impreza WRX	26; 8	Mark Butcher	Warren Phillip-Clarke; John Caldicott	ARC
Wauchope Motors	Mitsubishi Lancer Evo IX	9	Michael Boaden	Helen Cheers	ARC
Otech Australia	Toyota Corolla Sportivo	10	Simon Knowles	Margot Knowles	Group N P
Fullerton Financial Services	Mitsubishi Lancer Evo IX	11	Bruce Fullerton	Hugh Reardon-Smith	ARC
Trenk Contracting Pty Ltd	Holden VE Commodore SS	15	Jacob Bruinsma	Lisa White; Adam Tillett	PRC
MaxyRally.com	Ford Fiesta ST	18	Razvan Vlad	Daynom Nicoli	Group N P
Desitrol	Mitsubishi Lancer Evo VI	21	John Goasdoue	Martin Darch	ARC
Rallyschool.com.au	Mitsubishi Lancer Evo VIII	22	Charlie Drake	Ben Atkinson	PRC
Lake Mountain Ski Hire	Mitsubishi Lancer Evo V	25	Derek Reynolds	Ray Baker; Rian Calder	PRC
BP / Citibank	Mitsubishi Lancer Evo IV	25	Mike Bailey	Caitlin Earley; Jeremy Browne	PRC
Miles Landscaping	Subaru Impreza WRX	27; 28	Graeme Miles	Luke Goodman; Greg Miles	PRC
Repco Rally Team	Subaru Impreza WRX STi	27	Mick Patton	Kirrilee Gentleman	PRC
Difflam	Mitsubishi Lancer Evo III	29	Nigel Shellshear	Paul Fletcher	PRC
Cambray Sheep Cheese	Subaru Impreza WRX STi	30	Tom Wilde	Nerralie Wilde	PRC
Berne Road Contractors	Subaru Impreza WRX	30	John Berne	Tony Best	PRC
Rally Power Motorsport	Subaru Impreza WRX STi	31	James Rodda	Marcus Piristi	PRC
Rallyschool	Mitsubishi Lancer Evo VIII	32	Charlie Drake	Matthew Harriott	PRC
Gunnawyn Logistics	Hyundai Getz	32	Tony Moore	Nikki Moore	PRC
Aero Fast Industrial Fastners	Mazda 323	38	Mark Casper	Greg Bankin	PRC
Speedie Contractors	Mitsubishi Lancer Evo VI	40	Luke Page	Tiffany Baker-Schaefer	PRC

== Drivers Championship ==
Pointscore as follows.

Pos	Driver	Forest		Queensland			South Australia		Rally Australia			Victoria		Total
Pos	Driver	Leg1	Leg2	Leg1	Leg2	Overall	Leg1	Leg2	Leg1	Leg2	Overall	Leg1	Leg2	Total
1	Justin Dowel	30	30	20	15	32	40	41						208
2	Ryan Smart	40	41	15	20	41	Ret	30						187
3	Mark Pedder	34	34	17	17	32	34	Ret						168
4	Mark Butcher	18	14	5	8	14	20	18						97
5	Steven Shepheard	8	Ret	13	13	26	30	Ret						90
6	Simon Knowles	16	18	7	9	18	9	10						87
7	Eli Evans	26	10	Ret	Ret	Ret	22	26						84
7	Derek Reynolds	20	20	4	3	6	6	4						84
9	Michael Boaden			11	Ret	Ret	26	34						71
10	John Goasdoue			8	11	22	Ret	22						63
11	Charlie Drake	14	Ret	10	Ret	Ret	14	20						58
12	Mick Patton			6	7	16	12	16						57
13	Razvan Vlad	12	16	4	3	6	6	4						51
14	Tom Wilde	22	26											48
15	James Rodda	7	22				18	Ret						47
15	Jacob Bruinsma	9	12	3	5	9	3	6						47
17	Luke Page	Ret	Ret	9	10	20								39
18	Nigel Shellshear			3	6	12	8	9						38
19	John Berne			2	5	10	4	5						26
20	Graeme Miles	10	Ret				7	7						24
21	Bruce Fullerton						10	12						22
22	Tony Moore			2	4	8	2	3						19
23	Mike Bailey			Ret	Ret	Ret	5	8						13
24	Mark Casper			1	4	5	1	1						12
25	Barry Kirk						Ret	2						2
