= South Australian Rally Championship =

- Category: Rallying
- Country: South Australia
- Inaugural season: 1968
- Drivers' champion: James Rodda; David Langfield
- Official website: SA Rally Panel Website

== 2014 South Australian Rally Championship Calendar ==
Round	Rally	Location	Date
1	Avondale Stages	Broken Hill (NSW)	26 April
2	Robertstown Walky 100*	Robertstown	28 June Event Run on 27 September
3	Scouts Rally SA	Adelaide Hils	1–3 August
4	Walky Stages	Loxton	27 September Event canceled due to Loss of Clerk of Course
5	Southern Rally	Second Valley	26 October

*Robertstown Walky 100 was postponed due to flooding rain. **Walky Stages
