= 2008 International Rally of Canberra =

The 2008 International Rally of Canberra was the second Round on the Australian Rally Championship calendar. The 2008 version of the Rally once again saw competitors from the Asia-Pacific Rally Championship, the Australian Rally Championship and the local Rally Championship in the Australian Capital Territory (PCD Engineering ACT Regional Rally Series). A total of 62 competitors started the Rally.

== The results ==
The race was once again held around the Nation's Capital. The gravel roads surrounding the city were once again utilized in the race. A total of 48 cars (not including the local Rally series competing alongside the 2 main competitions) competed across the 18 stages of the Rally. One special note is that the 2008 British Rally Championship Winner, Guy Wilks also competed in this year's Rally.

Asia-Pacific Rally Championship International Rally Results

LEG ONE

Pos.	Driver	Class	Time	Time Behind
1	Cody Crocker	APRC	01:12:13.5	00:00.0
2	Scott Pedder	APRC	01:13:01.3	00:47.8
3	Eli Evans	APRC	01:13:15.9	01:02.4
4	Dean Herridge	APRC	01:13:32.4	01:18.9
5	Guy Wilks	APRC	01:14:57.0	02:43.5
6	Rifat Sungkar	APRC	01:15:50.0	03:36.5
7	Hiroshi Yanagisawa	APRC	01:15:53.6	03:40.1
8	Jean-Louis Leyraud	APRC	01:16:47.2	04:33.7
9	Atushi Masumura	APRC	01:19:45.4	07:31.9
10	Brian Green	APRC	01:22:14.4	10:00.0
Retirements	Driver	Class	Reason	
	Katsuhiko Taguchi	APRC	Mechanical	
	Nathan Quin	APRC	Fuel Pump	
	Takuma Kamada	APRC	Suspension	
	Patrick Christian	APRC	Gearbox	
	Patrick Yanai	APRC		

LEG TWO

Pos.	Driver	Class	Time	Time Behind
1	Cody Crocker	APRC	02:23:31.9	00:00.0
2	Dean Herridge	APRC	02:26:23.5	02:51.6
3	Hiroshi Yanagisawa	APRC	02:29:47.8	06:15.9
4	Rifat Sungkar	APRC	02:30:38.2	07:06.3
5	Jean-Louis Leyraud	APRC	02:31:24.8	07:52.9
6	Atushi Masumura	APRC	02:38:24.5	14:52.6
7	Brian Green	APRC	02:41:22.1	17:50
Retirements	Driver	Class	Reason	
	Guy Wilks	APRC	Stopped after SS10	
	Eli Evans	Super 2000	Stopped after SS10	
	Scott Pedder	APRC	Damaged Sump	
	Takuma Kamada	APRC	Stopped after SS12	
