= Group N =

1982–2013 FIA racing car classification for series-production cars

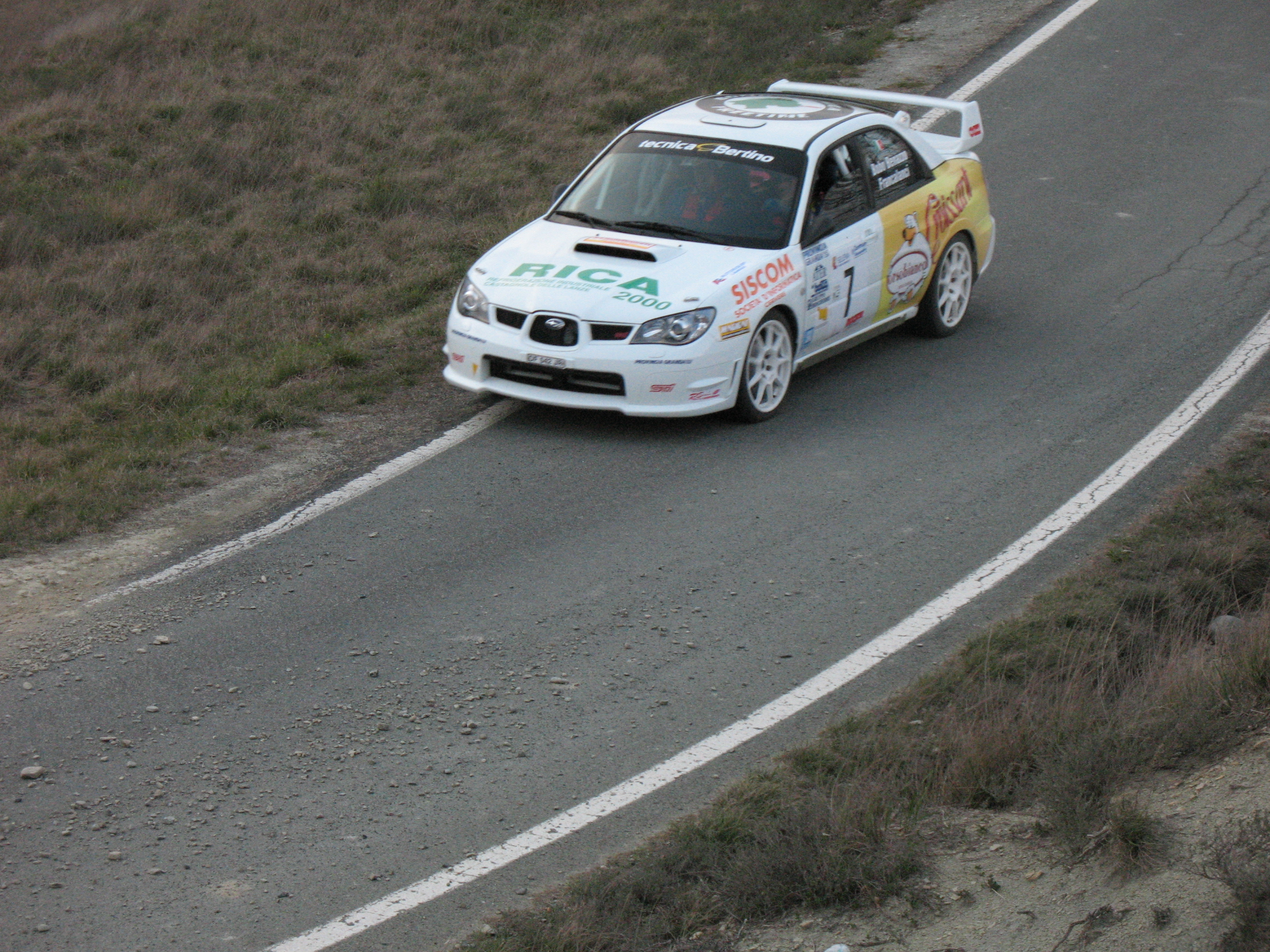
Group N Subaru Impreza WRX STi

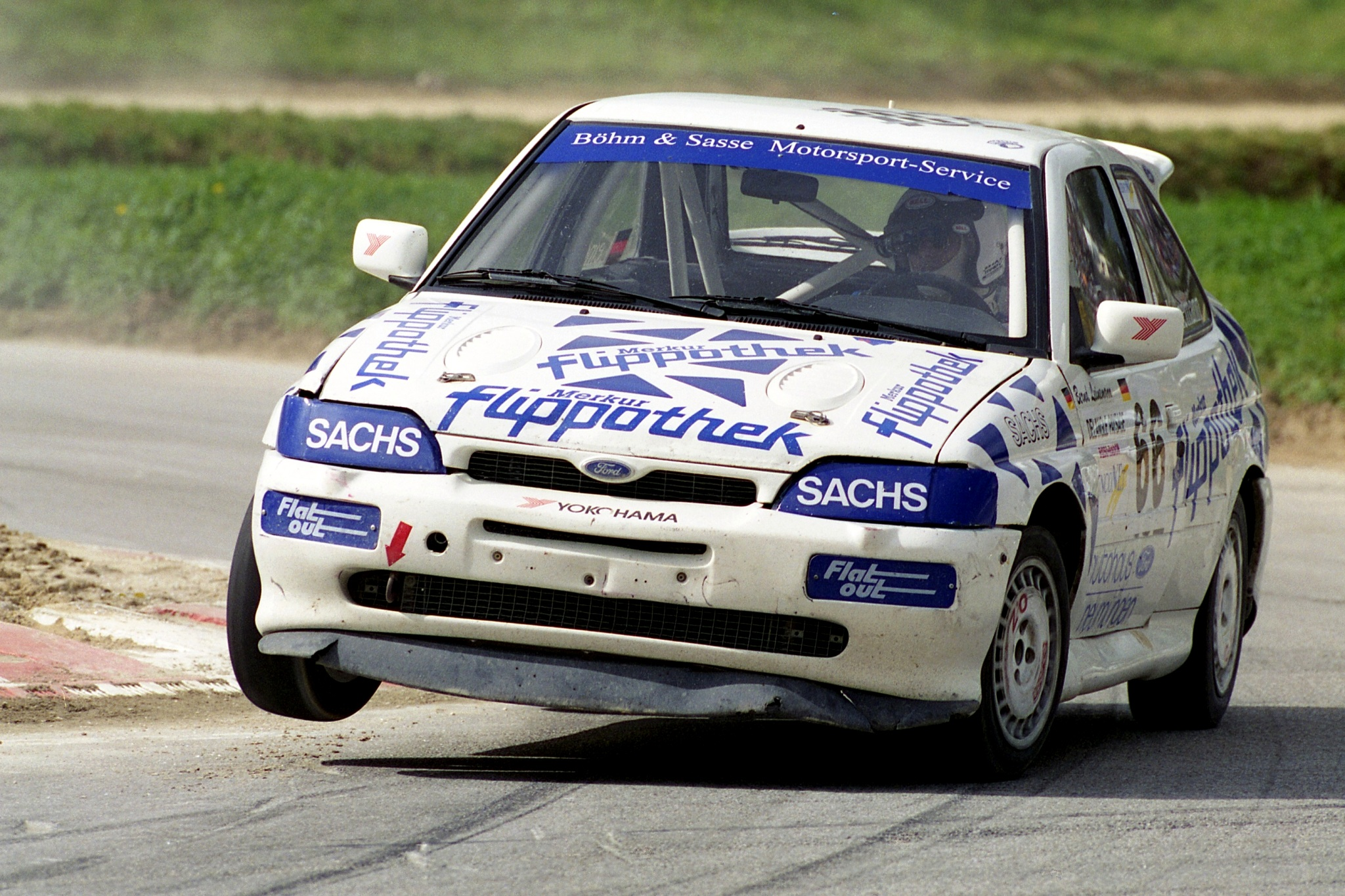
Group N Ford Escort RS Cosworth

Group N is a set of technical regulations for standard production-based racecars by the Fédération Internationale de l'Automobile (FIA). They are limited in terms of modifications permitted to the standard specification by the manufacturer, making them a cost effective method of production vehicle motorsport. Often referred to as the "showroom class", Group N contrasts with Group A which has greater freedom to modify and tune the cars to be more suitable to racing. Both groups may have the same or similar models homologated by a manufacturer.

Group N was introduced by the FIA in 1982 to replace the outgoing Group 1 as "standard touring cars". At this time there were not specific formulae for production racing cars in competition. The World Rally Championship (WRC), for example, only permitted groups A, B and N cars to compete (Group B was banned from 1987). It was not until 1997 that the World Rally Car formula was introduced and other specific formulae were introduced in later years. Both group N and A, and the details of their differences, are described in the FIAs International Sporting Code and several of its appendices.

To qualify for homologation, a minimum of 2500 cars of the competing model have to be produced in the 12 months prior to homologation. The homologation period runs for seven years after every consecutive year of qualifying production of the model, with production of the model considered stopped when less than 10% (250) are made in one year. Before 1993 the production requirement was 5000.

== Circuit racing ==
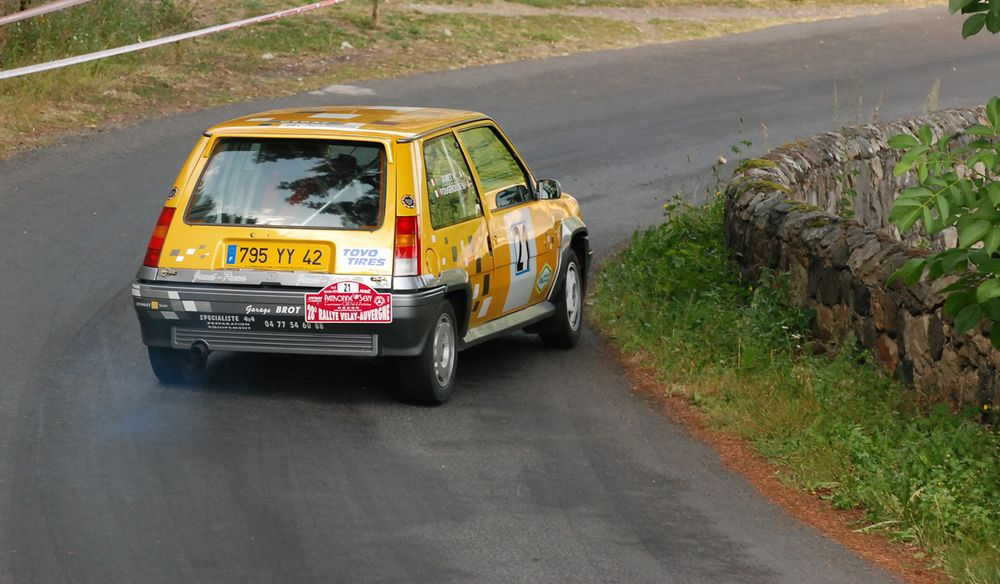
Renault 5 GT Turbo, Group N world championship winner in 1989 and 1990

=== Touring cars ===
While Group A became the standard category for international level touring car racing, Group N found a home as a more economic class in national level touring car racing. In many countries, there would often be two touring car championships, one for Group A and one for Group N. The category had some brief success with the demise of the Supertouring class in the late 1990s, when a few national regulations were relaxed to allow a greater number of modifications, in the guise of Super Production.

=== Endurance racing ===
The category is still used in circuit racing all over the world, especially in Japan, which has the long running Super Taikyu (スーパー耐久, Super Taikyu; translated as 'Super Endurance'), as well as in the Italian ETCS endurance series run by Peroni Promotion, but was once again relegated to a secondary status with the introduction of Super 2000, the class of cars currently run in the World Touring Car Championship.

== Rallying ==
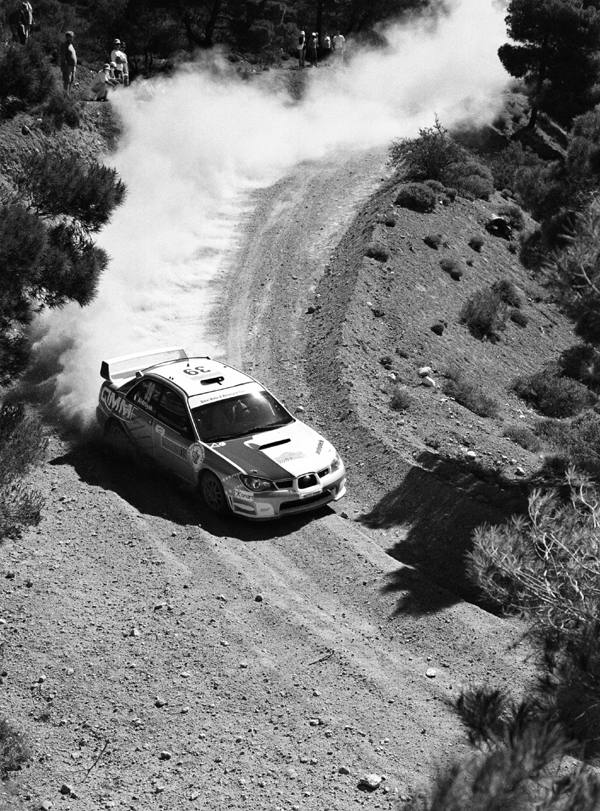
A Subaru Impreza WRX STI at the 2006 Acropolis Rally

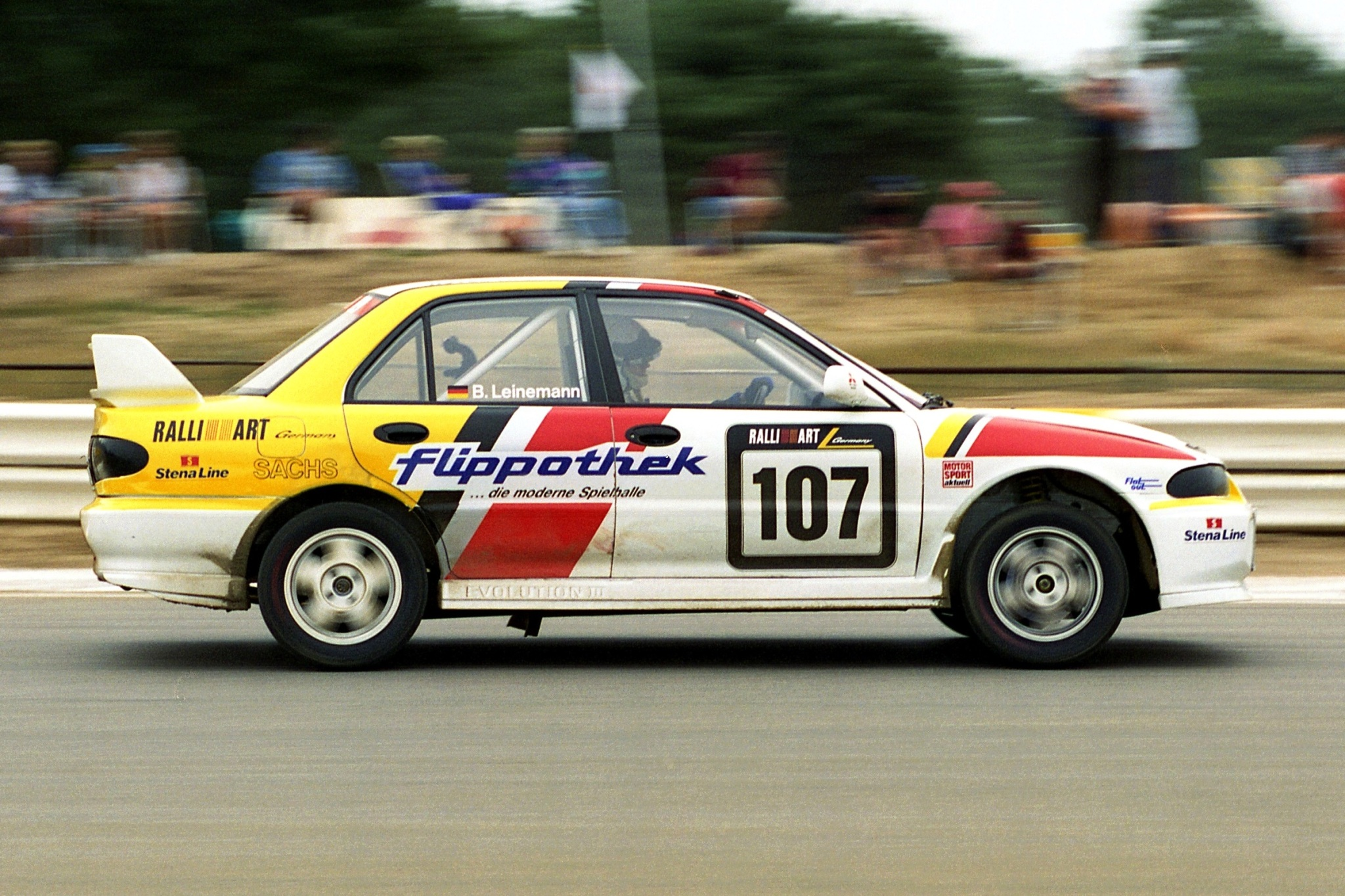
A Mitsubishi Lancer Evo 3 competing in the 1996 FIA European Rallycross Championship

In rallying, Group N could be entered into the open WRC driver and co-driver championships and the manufacturers championship until 1997. Due to the nature of Group A cars being more suitable and tuned race cars they tended to dominate results. A Group N car has won a WRC rally once, a Renault 5 driven by Alain Oreille at the Rallye Côte d'Ivoire in 1989.

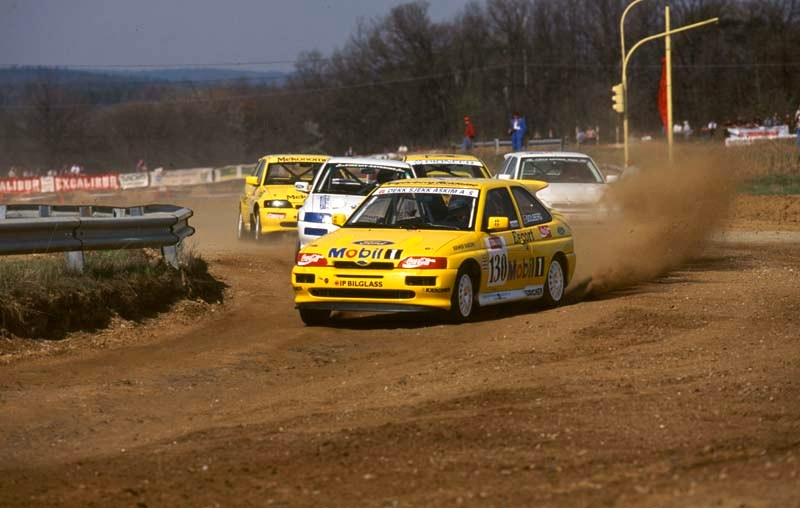
A Group N Ford Escort RS Cosworths competing in the 1995 FIA European Rallycross Championship

Group N had four classes based on engine displacement cylinder capacity. N1 was for cars up to 1400 cc, N2 was 1401-1600 cc, N3 was 1601-2000 cc and N4 was over 2000cc. Cars fitted with a turbo had their displacement capacity multiplied by 1.7 to determine class. Only N4 class cars remain homologated as of November 2021 as the other classes had been phased out in FIA competition.

The Production World Rally Championship was run under Group N rules between 1987 and 2012. Popular cars used were often based on turbocharged, four wheel drive versions of standard consumer production cars such as the Subaru Impreza WRX and the Mitsubishi Lancer Evolution, although a wide range of vehicles were homologated by the FIA including small two wheel drive hatchbacks.

Group N regulations were intended to be phased out from rally competition in 2013. With the introduction of Group R the FIA created the R4 class intending it to be the "new Group N" and existing N4 cars could also be re-homologated in the new group. This was abandoned in 2015 and a new sporting class, NR4, was added where four-wheel drive Group N cars over 2000 cc could continue to compete within the Group R format. R4 cars were then not allowed in FIA-sanctioned rallies in Europe, but since R4 was basically a transition group for old homologated Group N, many of those could be run in NR4.

In the reform of the support championships in the 2013 season, the Group N4's cars were some of the eligible cars in WRC-2, considering their competitiveness to the other types like Super 2000 and Group R cars in the category, there was also a FIA Production Car Cup among N4 cars in WRC-2. Group N cars have not been eligible for WRC rallies since 2019 but the FIA regional rally championships continue to allow N4 cars.

Away from FIA sanctioned events, many rallies at national level are run under Group N. Some local variants of Group N have been created to allow other marques to compete where Group N is the national formula.

== Allowed modifications ==
The range of modifications allowed was quite narrow - few mechanical engine modifications were allowed (save for lightening within set limits and baffled sumps) although the choice of ECU was free, and this could liberate some extra power itself, and most of the modifications allowed were to promote longevity rather than increased performance, although the boundaries of these two areas were blurring towards the end of the group's lifespan. Furthermore, cars with forced induction engines were fitted with a restrictor in front of the charger to limit power.

Originally, Group N meant that all the interior trim had to be present (including the rear seat), but it later changed to allow removal of the trim aside from the dashboard and replacement of the door trim. The springs and dampers were free, as are the internals of the gearbox and the final-drive ratio, providing that the homologated gear ratios and gear change pattern were respected. This allowed the use of dog-engagement gearboxes, providing quicker gearchanges and longer gearbox life. There was provision for strengthening of the suspension components and bodyshell, provided this didn't alter the operating principle.
