= Rally of South Australia =

The Rally of South Australia is a round of the Australian Rally Championship. Rally SA is promoted and staged by the South Australian Motor Sport Board (SAMSB). After a six-year break, the SAMSB re-introduced a round of the ARC in 2001.

The 2019 rally was called "AGL Rally SA - Rally of the Heartland" and was held 1-2 June 2019.
