= Super 2000 =

Race car class

Motor racing formula
- Category: Touring cars Rally cars
- Country or region: International
- Championships: Various
- Inaugural season: 2000
- Status: Active

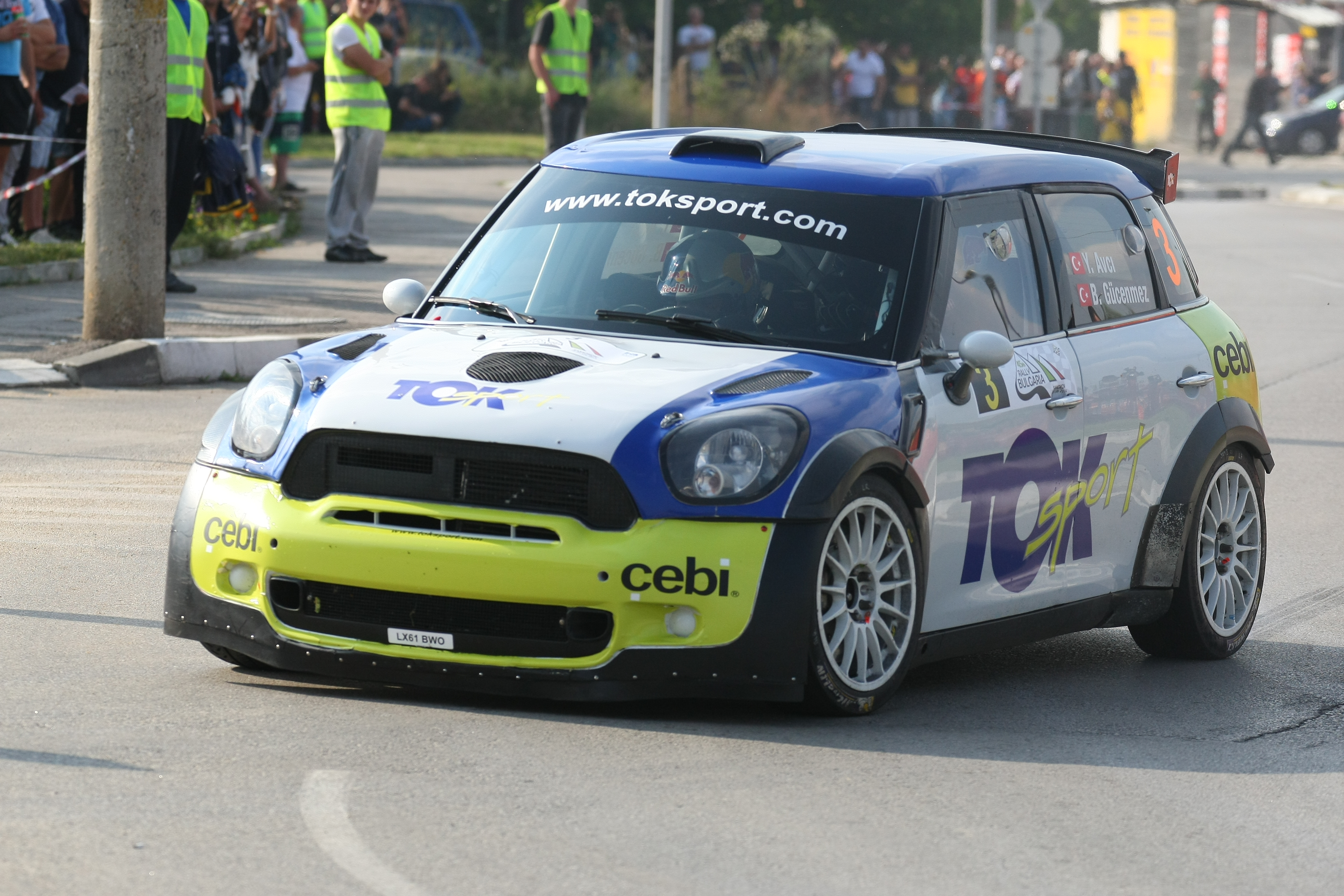
Avci Yagiz and Gücenmez Bahadir (Turkey), with Mini Cooper S2000 1.6T LX61 BWO Toksport class RC2 in Rallye Bulgaria 2014

Super 2000 is an FIA powertrain specification used in the World Rally Championship, the British Touring Car Championship, the World Touring Car Championship, and other touring car championships. The engines were originally 2 L naturally aspirated, and later 1.6 L turbocharged units were allowed producing approximately 280 bhp.

The goal of the Super 2000 classification is to allow more manufacturers and privateers to race by reducing the cost of a competitive car.

In order to cut costs and shorten development time, the Super 2000 rally cars originally used a common control gearbox and drivetrain made by the French company, Sadev. The FIA has since announced that Xtrac and Ricardo Consulting Engineers will be allowed to also manufacture S2000 gearboxes to FIA specification. This is to further cut costs by introducing competition into gearbox supply.

These new rules allowed Ford to build from scratch their S2000 Fiesta vehicles in Australia, in as little as 14 weeks, starting out with a Super 1600 chassis and rollcage.

== Specifications ==
Until 2011, FIA specifications for Super 2000 cars were as follows:

- Derived from production model, of which at least 2500 have been produced in the past year
- Maximum of 2 litre (2000 cc) displacement
- 8500 rpm maximum
- All wheel drive is permitted in rally cars, but not in touring cars.
- 6-speed sequential gearbox (Control specification), or 5-speed MT gearbox retaining original gear ratios.
- Front and rear MacPherson suspension
- No electronic driver aids

In 2011 the specifications were revised, allowing 1600 cc turbocharged engines, and the use of 2000 cc normally-aspirated engines rapidly stopped as a result. These 1600 cc turbo engines fully replaced the 2 litre engines.

For the 2014 WTCC season, the TC1 regulations were introduced for touring cars. For the engine this included a larger air intake restrictor allowing power outputs of 380 bhp and more.

== Models ==
=== Rally cars ===
New regulations for the FIA World Rally Car were introduced in 2011. WRC cars would use the Super 2000 specification, and be powered by a 1600 cc turbo engine instead of the 2000 cc used previously. The WRC car would thus be based on the current 2011 model Super 2000 cars fitted with a supplementary kit for rallying. The kit must be able to be fitted or removed within a defined time limit.

Notes:

^{A} From 2012 the Regional Rally Car (commonly known as RRC) class was introduced. These cars became fitted with a 1.6 turbocharged engines similar to those used in the WRC cars, and with a smaller restrictor diameter of 30mm instead of 33mm. And with a body kit that also had to comply to the Super 2000 regulations.

=== Touring cars ===
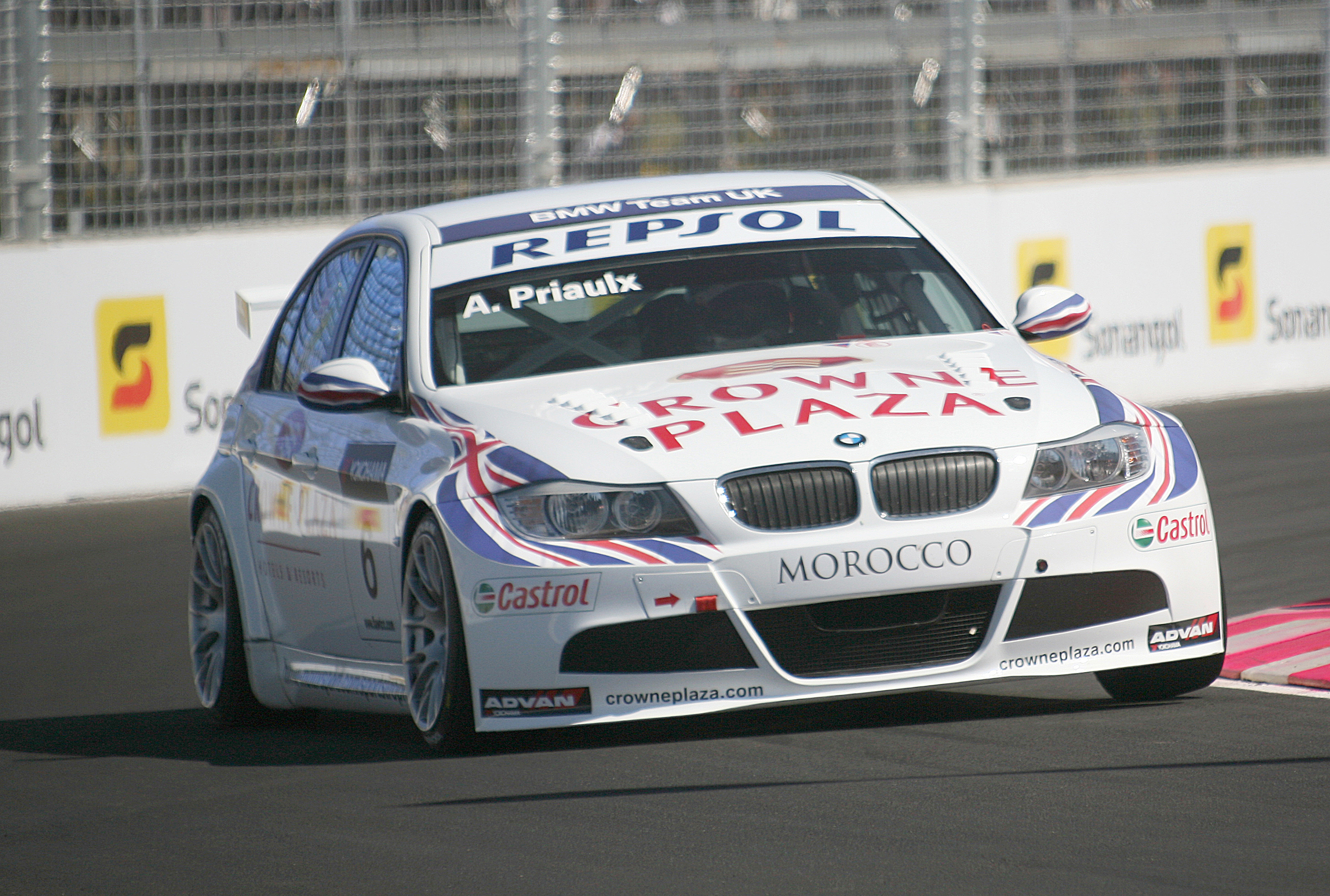
A Super 2000 BMW 320si competing in the 2009 World Touring Car Championship

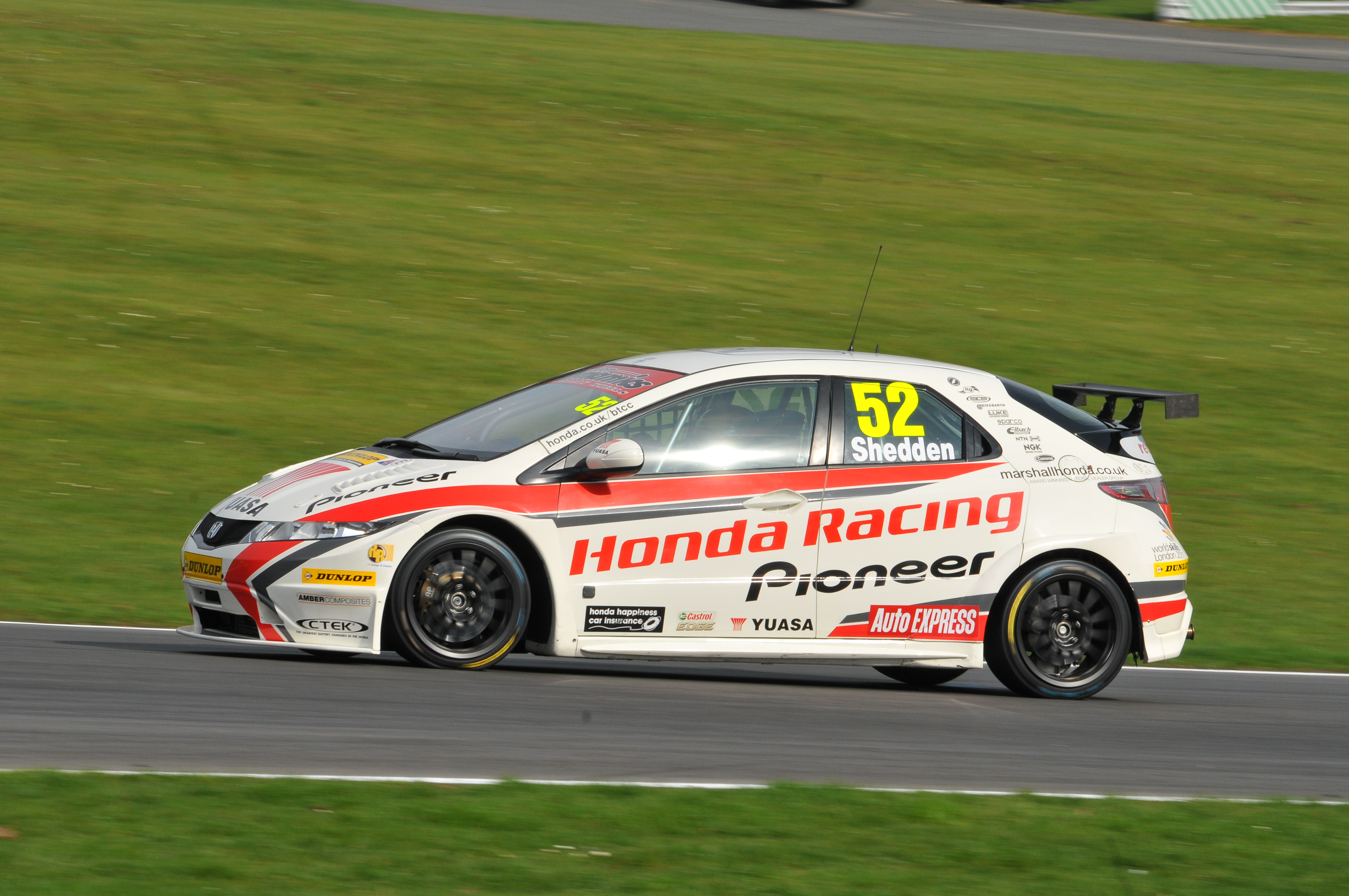
A Super 2000 Honda Civic competing in the BTCC

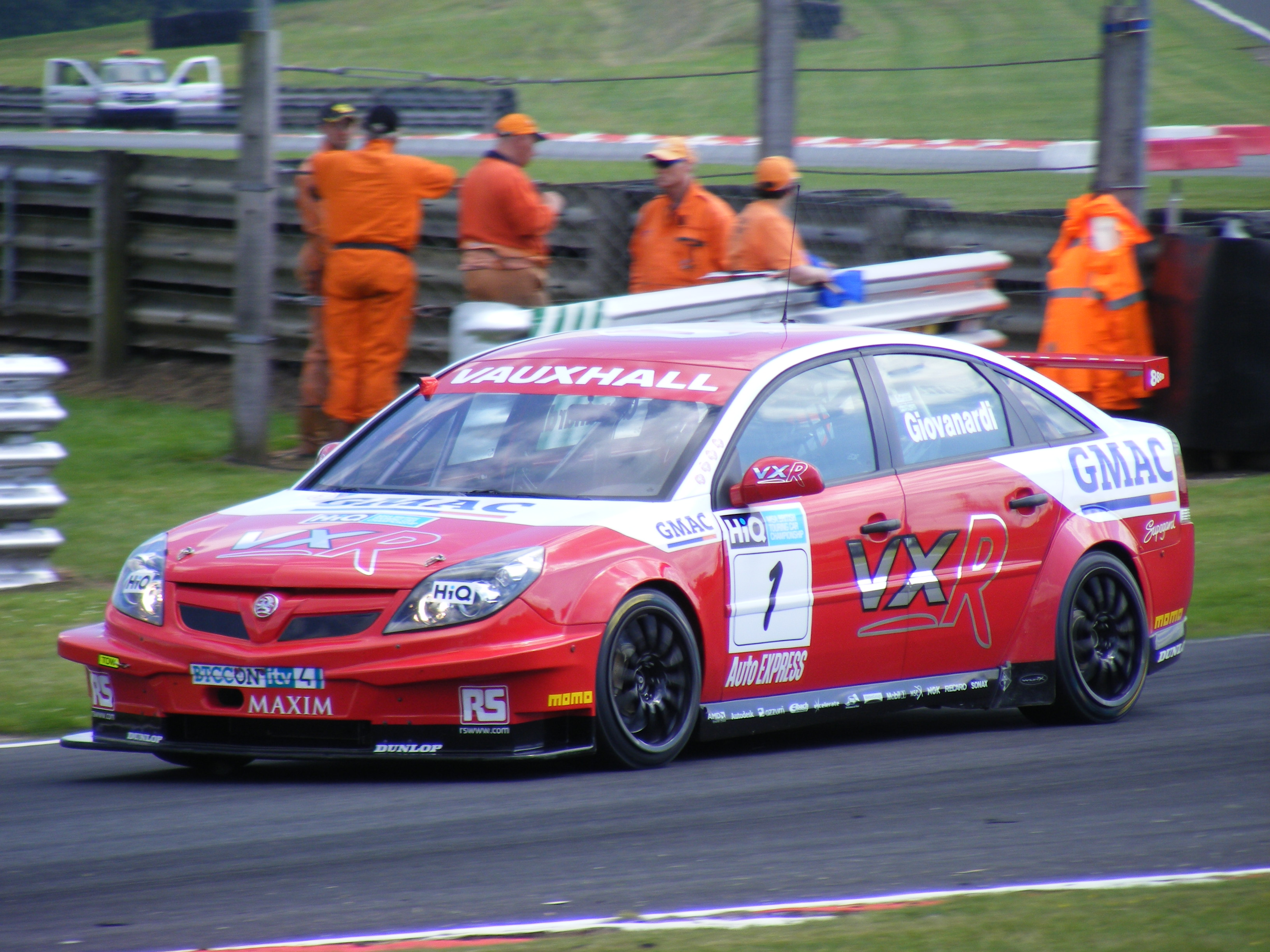
Fabrizio Giovanardi driving a S2000 Vauxhall Vectra C for the VX Racing team in the British Touring Car Championship.

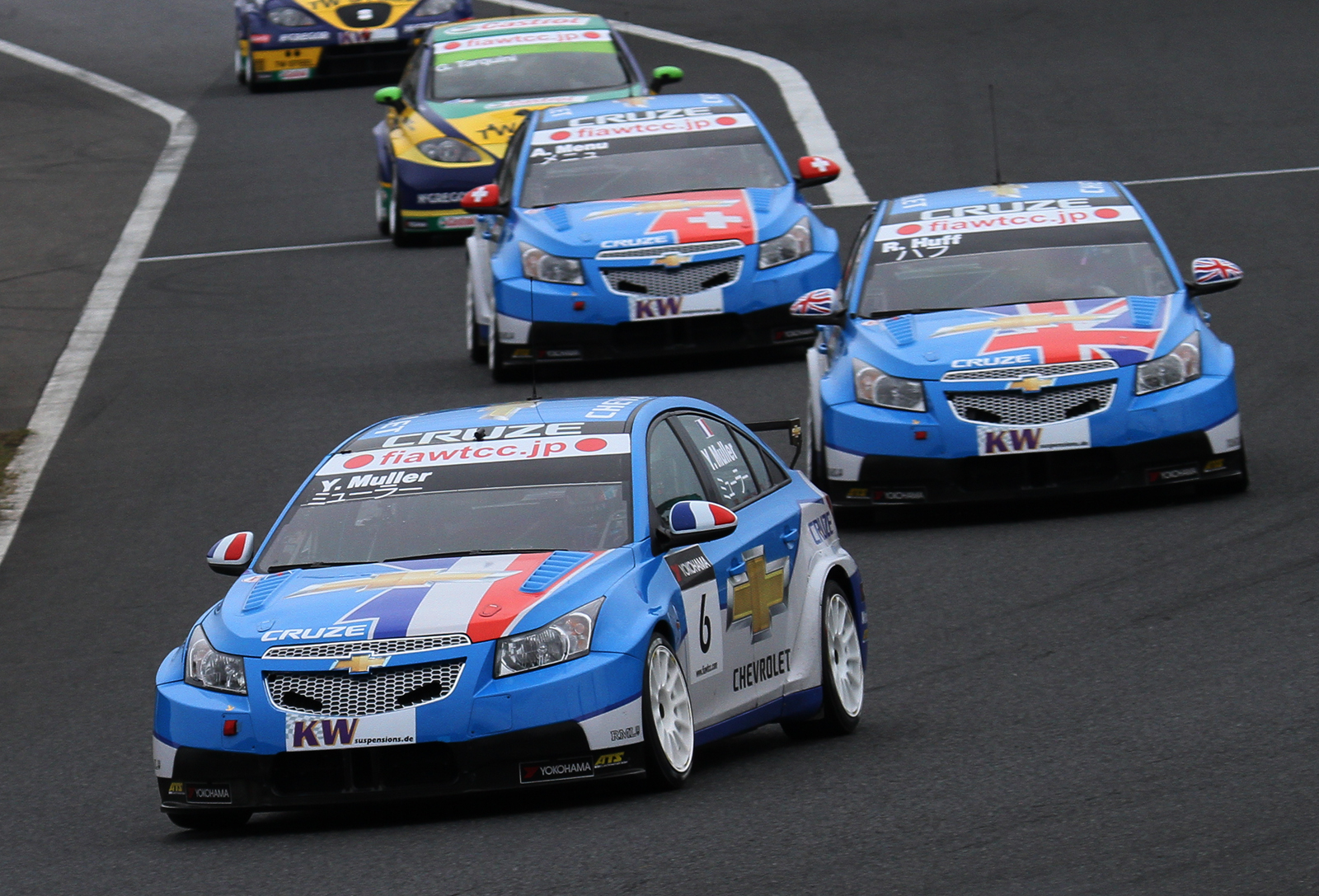
S2000 Chevrolet Cruze's which won the Manufacturers' Championship in the 2010, 2011 and 2012 World Touring Car Championship season.

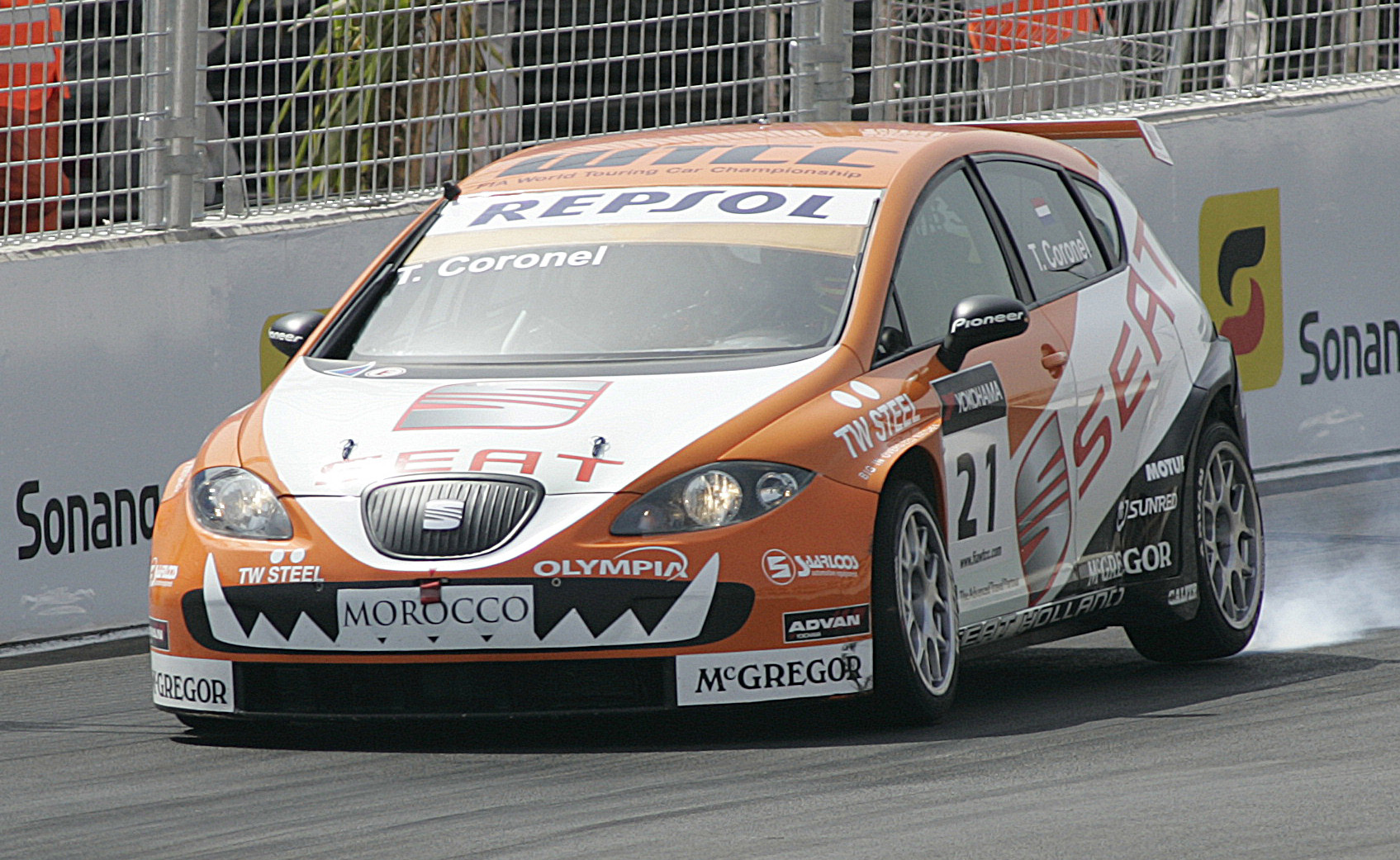
A S2000 SEAT Leon at the 2009 FIA WTCC Race of Morocco

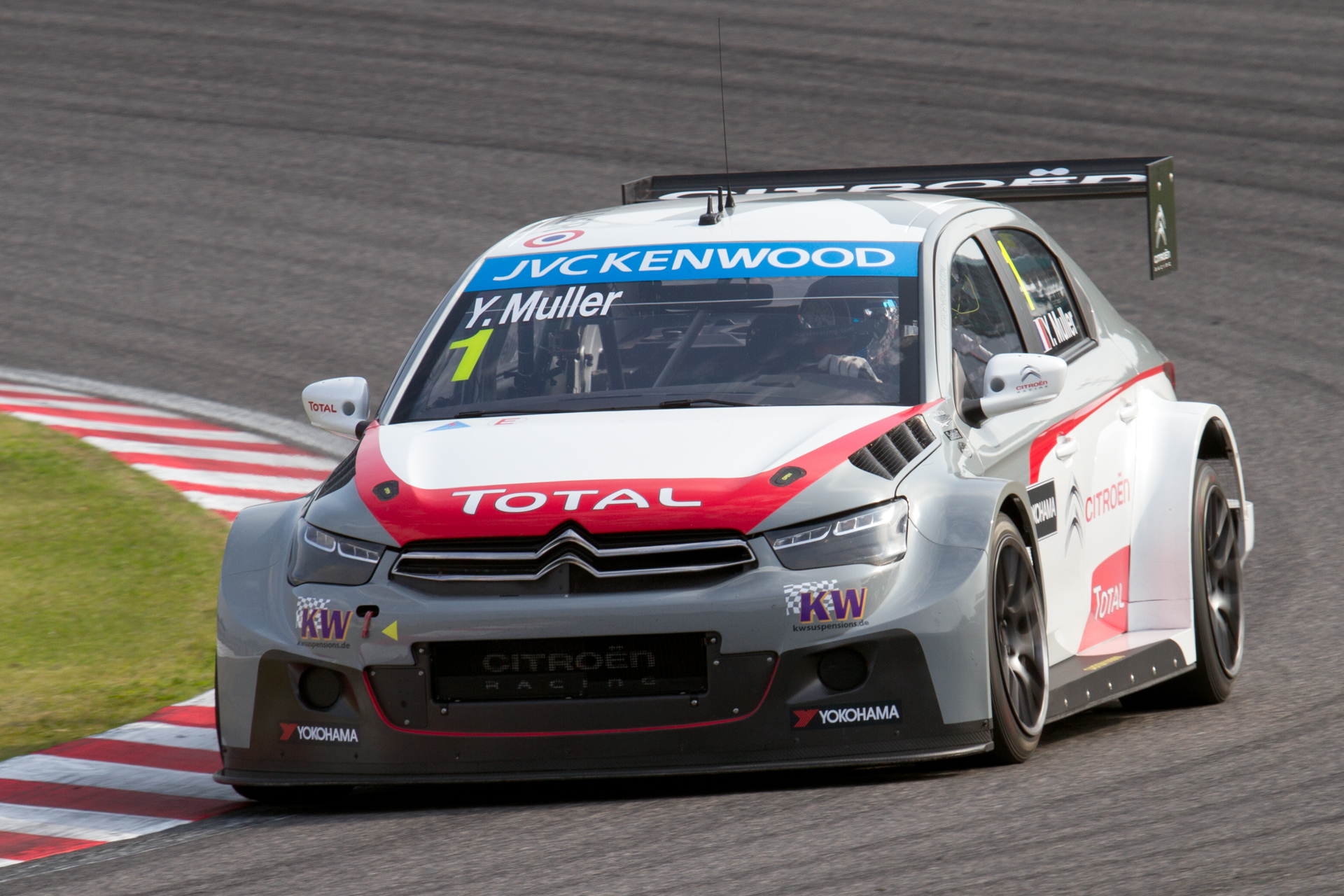
A Citroën C-Élysée competing in the 2014 FIA World Touring Car Championship

The following cars were built under the TC1 (2014–2017) regulations:

- Chevrolet RML Cruze TC1
- Citroën C-Élysée
- Honda Civic WTCC
- Lada Granta TC1
- Lada Vesta WTCC
- Volvo S60 Polestar TC1

The following cars were built under the TC2 Turbo (2011–2013) regulations:

- BMW 320 TC
- Chevrolet Cruze 1.6T
- Ford Focus S2000 TC
- Honda Civic Turbo S2000
- Lada Granta 16000 TC
- SEAT León 1.6 T
- Volvo C30 S2000 Turbo

=== List of Super 2000 Cars ===
Manufacturer	Car	Image	Debut	Application
(Italy) Alfa Romeo	156		2002	Touring Car
(Germany) BMW	320i		2005	Touring Car
(Germany) BMW	320si		2006	Touring Car
(Germany) BMW	320 TC		2011	TC2 Turbo
(United States) Chevrolet	Cruze 1.6T		2011	TC2 Turbo
(United States) Chevrolet	Cruze TC1		2014	TC1
(United States) Chevrolet	Lacetti		2005	Touring Car
(France) Citroën	C-Élysée		2015	TC1
(France) Citroën	DS3 RRC		2013	Rally
(Italy) Fiat	Grande Punto Abarth S2000		2006	Rally
(United Kingdom) Ford	Focus S2000 TC		2011	TC2 Turbo
(United Kingdom) Ford	Fiesta RRC		2012	Rally
(United Kingdom) Ford	Fiesta S2000		2009	Rally
(Japan) Honda	Accord Euro R		2006	Touring Car
(Japan) Honda	Civic Turbo S2000		2012	TC2 Turbo
(Japan) Honda	Civic WTCC		2014	TC1
(Russia) Lada	110		2008	Touring Car
(Russia) Lada	Granta 16000 TC		2012	TC2 Turbo
(Russia) Lada	Granta TC1		2014	TC1
(Russia) Lada	Priora		2009	Touring Car
(Russia) Lada	Vesta WTCC		2015	TC1
(United Kingdom) Mini	John Cooper Works S2000		2011	Rally
(France) Peugeot	207 S2000		2007	Rally
(Malaysia) Proton	Satria Neo S2000		2011	Rally
(Spain) SEAT	León 1.6 T		2011	TC2 Turbo
(Spain) SEAT	Toledo		2004	Touring Car
(Czech Republic) Škoda	Fabia S2000		2009	Rally
(Germany) Volkswagen	Golf		2010	Touring Car
(Germany) Volkswagen	Polo S2000		2007	Rally
(Germany) Volkswagen	Scirocco		2010	Touring Car
(Sweden) Volvo	C30 S2000 Turbo		2011	TC2 Turbo

== Series ==
Super 2000 spec cars have run in:

Rally Competitions:

- World Rally Championship (as specification of World Rally Car)
- World Rally Championship-2 (formerly Super 2000 World Rally Championship or S-WRC)
- British Rally Championship
- European Rally Championship (including the former Intercontinental Rally Challenge)
- Asia-Pacific Rally Championship
- Australian Rally Championship
- Italian Rally Championship
- Codasur South American Rally Championship
- South African Rally Championship

Touring Car competitions:

- World Touring Car Championship (2005–2014)
- European Touring Car Cup (2002–2017)
- ADAC Procar Series (2005–2014)
- Swedish Touring Car Championship (2003–2012)
- Dominican Touring Series
- Russian Touring Car Championship
- Asian Touring Car Series

South Africa was the first country in the world to run Super 2000 cars in rallying. Toyota South Africa and Volkswagen South Africa each built 2 cars to compete in the South African Rally Championship in 2005.

== See also ==
- Diesel 2000, the related category for diesel powered touring cars
- Super 1600, a rally car formula that is primarily used in the Junior World Rally Championship
- Super 2000 World Rally Championship, a companion rally series to the World Rally Championship
- Group R5, a successor of S2000 Rally
- Group Rally2, a successor of Group R5
- TCR Touring Car, as successor of S2000 Touring Cars
